= List of Philadelphia Independence players =

Philadelphia Independence was an American soccer club founded in 2009, after being awarded the eighth Women's Professional Soccer (WPS) franchise. The Independence played only two full seasons of competitive soccer in 2010 season and 2011 season, when the league ultimately folded in 2012.

== Statistics ==
All rostered players during WPS season or post season are included even if they did not make an appearance. Amateur call-ups are only included if they made an appearance. All statistics have been referenced from Soccerway.com, WomensProSoccer.com, and other box scores.

=== League Statistics ===
==== Field Players ====
All statistics include only WPS regular season matches, and are correct as of February 27, 2018.

Name	Pos.	Country	Acquired From	Tenure	Apps.	Mins.	Goals	Assists
Danesha Adams	FW	USA	(United States) Chicago Red Stars	2010-2011	27	1173	4	3
Verónica Boquete	FW	ESP	(Spain) RCD Espanyol	2010-2011	11	902	5	4
Jen Buczkowski	MF	USA	(United States) Sky Blue FC	2010-2011	41	3425	0	1
Laura del Rio	DF	ESP	(United States) Boston Breakers	2011	15	471	2	3
Tina DiMartino	MF	USA	(United States) Saint Louis Athletica	2010	16	1162	4	0
Gina DiMartino	FW	USA	(United States) Boston College	2010	1	29	0	0
Allison Falk	DF	USA	(United States) Saint Louis Athletica	2010-2011	22	1917	2	2
Sinead Farrelly	MF	USA	(United States) Virginia University	2011	14	1101	1	2
Kelly Henderson	MF	USA	(United States) Boston College	2010	2	254	0	0
Estelle Johnson	DF	CMR	(United States) Los Angeles Sol	2010-2011	28	2009	1	1
Tasha Kai	FW	USA	(United States) Sky Blue FC	2011	17	1234	9	1
Sara Larsson	DF	SWE	(United States) Saint Louis Athletica	2010	13	1036	0	0
Lori Lindsey	MF	USA	(United States) Washington Freedom	2010-2011	32	2203	2	10
Joanna Lohman	MF	USA	(United States) Washington Freedom	2010-2011	33	2285	5	2
Hólmfríður Magnúsdóttir	FW	(Iceland) ICE	(Sweden) Kristianstads DFF	2010-2011	31	2180	4	1
Karina Maruyama	FW	JPN	(Japan) TEPCO Mareeze	2010	4	88	0	0
Kia McNeill	DF	USA	(United States) Atlanta Beat	2011	17	1453	1	0
Heather Mitts	DF	USA	(United States) Boston Breakers	2010	17	1258	0	0
Carrie Patterson	FW	USA	(United States) University of Georgia	2010	1	18	0	0
Lyndsey Patterson	MF	USA	(United States) Los Angeles Sol	2010	15	285	1	1
Nikki Phillips	MF	POL	(United States) Chicago Red Stars	2010-2011	41	3650	0	0
Katherine Reynolds	DF	USA	(United States) University of Santa Clara	2010	3	0	0	0
Leigh Ann Robinson	DF	USA	(United States) Atlanta Beat	2011	17	1530	0	2
Amy Rodriguez	FW	USA	(United States) Boston Breakers	2010-2011	33	2643	14	6
Lianne Sanderson	FW	ENG	(England) Chelsea L.F.C.	2010-2011	40	1864	8	5
Caroline Seger	MF	SWE	(Sweden) Linköpings FC	2010	18	1516	1	5
Sarah Senty	DF	USA	(Sweden) Linköpings FC	2010	10	457	0	0

==== Goalkeepers ====
All statistics include only WPS regular season matches, and are correct as of February 28, 2018.

Name	Country	Acquired From	Tenure	Apps.	Mins.	Wins	Losses	Draws	GA	GAA	SO
Nicole Barnhart	USA	(United States) FC Gold Pride	2011	9	810	4	3	2	10	1.11	3
Valerie Henderson	USA	(United States) Los Angeles Sol	2010–2011	19	1710	12	6	1	15	1.21	6
Karina LeBlanc	CAN	(United States) Los Angeles Sol	2010	14	1260	5	5	4	21	1.50	2

=== WPS Playoffs ===
==== Field Players ====
All statistics include only WPS post-season matches, and are correct as of February 28, 2018.

Name	Pos.	Country	Acquired From	Tenure	Apps.	Mins.	Goals	Assists
Danesha Adams	FW	USA	(United States) Chicago Red Stars	2010-2011	5	196	1	1
Verónica Boquete	FW	ESP	(Spain) RCD Espanyol	2010-2011	2	210	0	0
Jen Buczkowski	MF	USA	(United States) Sky Blue FC	2010-2011	5	534	0	0
Laura del Rio	DF	ESP	(United States) Boston Breakers	2011	1	15	0	0
Tina DiMartino	MF	USA	(United States) Saint Louis Athletica	2010	3	330	0	2
Allison Falk	DF	USA	(United States) Saint Louis Athletica	2010-2011	3	330	2	2
Sinead Farrelly	MF	USA	(United States) Virginia University	2011	2	210	0	0
Kelly Henderson	MF	USA	(United States) Boston College	2010	4	17	0	0
Estelle Johnson	DF	CMR	(United States) Los Angeles Sol	2010-2011	5	540	0	0
Tasha Kai	FW	USA	(United States) Sky Blue FC	2011	2	136	1	0
Lori Lindsey	MF	USA	(United States) Washington Freedom	2010-2011	3	298	0	0
Joanna Lohman	MF	USA	(United States) Washington Freedom	2010-2011	1	34	0	0
Hólmfríður Magnúsdóttir	FW	(Iceland) ICE	(Sweden) Kristianstads DFF	2010-2011	3	298	0	0
Kia McNeill	DF	USA	(United States) Atlanta Beat	2011	2	210	0	0
Heather Mitts	DF	USA	(United States) Boston Breakers	2010	2	58	0	0
Lyndsey Patterson	MF	USA	(United States) Los Angeles Sol	2010	1	14	0	0
Nikki Phillips	MF	POL	(United States) Chicago Red Stars	2010-2011	5	540	0	0
Leigh Ann Robinson	DF	USA	(United States) Atlanta Beat	2011	2	210	0	0
Amy Rodriguez	FW	USA	(United States) Boston Breakers	2010-2011	5	540	3	1
Lianne Sanderson	FW	ENG	(England) Chelsea L.F.C.	2010-2011	4	214	0	0
Caroline Seger	MF	SWE	(Sweden) Linköpings FC	2010	3	304	1	0

==== Goalkeeper ====
All statistics include only WPS post-season matches, and are correct as of February 28, 2018.

Name	Country	Acquired From	Tenure	Apps.	Mins.	Wins	Losses	Draws	GA	GAA	SO
Nicole Barnhart	USA	(United States) FC Gold Pride	2011	2	180	1	1	0	1	1.11	1
Valerie Henderson	USA	(United States) Los Angeles Sol	2010–2011	3	330	2	1	0	5	1.67	1
