= 2010 Philadelphia Independence season =

Philadelphia Independence
2010 season
- Owner: (United States) Team Dynamics, LLC
- Head coach: (England) Paul Riley
- Stadium: John A. Farrell Stadium; West Chester, Pennsylvania
- Women's Professional Soccer: 3rd
- WPS Playoffs: Runners-up
- Top goalscorer: Amy Rodriguez (12)
- Highest home attendance: 6,028 (April 11 vs. Atlanta)
- Lowest home attendance: 2,093 (July 4 vs. Boston)
- Average home league attendance: 3,050
- Biggest win: 4–1 (2 matches)
- Biggest defeat: 1–3 (July 23 vs. FC Gold Pride)
Home colors	Away colors
- All statistics correct as of June 15, 2017.

The 2010 Philadelphia Independence season was the team's inaugural season of competition in the Women's Professional Soccer league.

== Review ==
The Philadelphia Independence of Women's Professional Soccer ended the 2010 season with a record of 10 wins and 10 losses and 4 ties for 34 points finishing third in WPS. The team compiled a postseason mark of 2-1. Paul Riley coached the team. The 2010 Philadelphia Independence lost in the Championship.

== Squad ==
=== Roster ===
2010 Independence Roster

Note: Flags indicate national team as defined under FIFA eligibility rules; some limited exceptions apply. Players may hold more than one non-FIFA nationality.

No.	Pos.	Nation	Player
—	FW	USA	Danesha Adams
—	MF	USA	Jen Buczkowski
—	FW	USA	Gina DiMartino
—	MF	USA	Tina DiMartino
—	DF	USA	Allison Falk
—	MF	USA	Kelly Henderson
—	GK	USA	Valerie Henderson
—	DF	CMR	Estelle Johnson
—	DF	SWE	Sara Larsson
—	GK	CAN	Karina LeBlanc
—	MF	USA	Lori Lindsey
—	MF	USA	Joanna Lohman

No.	Pos.	Nation	Player
—	FW	ISL	Hólmfríður Magnúsdóttir
—	FW	JPN	Karina Maruyama
—	DF	USA	Heather Mitts
—	FW	USA	Carrie Patterson
—	MF	USA	Lyndsey Patterson
—	DF	USA	Katherine Reynolds
—	MF	POL	Nikki Phillips
—	FW	USA	Amy Rodriguez
—	FW	ENG	Lianne Sanderson
—	MF	SWE	Caroline Seger
—	DF	USA	Sarah Senty

=== Team management ===
Position	Staff
Head coach	(England) Paul Riley
Assistant coach	(United States) Paul Royal
Assistant coach	(United States) Skip Thorp
Strength and conditioning coach	(United States) Mike Demakis

Last updated: November 10, 2011
Source: WPS

== Competition ==
=== Women's Professional Soccer ===
==== Regular season ====
April 11, 2010 1	Philadelphia Independence	0–0	Atlanta Beat	West Chester, PA
		Box Score	McNeill (yellow card) 90'	Stadium: John A. Farrell Stadium; Attendance: 6,028

April 18, 2010 2	Boston Breakers	1–1	Philadelphia Independence	Boston, MA
	Smith 49'	Box Score	Falk 55'; Seger (yellow card) 63'; Buczkowski (yellow card) 76' (yellow-red card) 86'	Stadium: Harvard Stadium; Attendance: 5,286

April 25, 2010 3	Philadelphia Independence	3–1	Washington Freedom	West Chester, PA
	Senty (yellow card) 16'; Magnúsdóttir (yellow card) 43'; Rodriguez 54'; Falk 57'; Sanderson 67'	Box Score	de Vanna 51'	Stadium: John A. Farrell Stadium; Attendance: 2,906

May 1, 2010 4	Philadelphia Independence	1–0	Atlanta Beat	West Chester, PA
	Lindsey 25'	Box Score		Stadium: John A. Farrell Stadium; Attendance: 2,760

May 8, 2010 5	Saint Louis Athletica	2–1	Philadelphia Independence	St Louis, MO
	Falk 41' (o.g.); Tarpley 59'; Boxx (yellow card) 86'	Box Score	Patterson 74'; Lindsey (yellow card) 89'	Stadium: Toyota Stadium; Attendance: 3,107

May 19, 2010 6	Chicago Red Stars	0–1	Philadelphia Independence	Bridgeview, IL
	Formiga (yellow card) 83'	Box Score	Lohman 6'	Stadium: Toyota Park; Attendance: 5,645

May 30, 2010 7	Washington Freedom	2–1	Philadelphia Independence	Germantown, MD
	Moros 24'; Wambach 33'	Box Score	Seger (red card) 87'; Sanderson 90'	Stadium: Maryland SoccerPlex; Attendance: 3,762

June 6, 2010 8	Philadelphia Independence	2–1	Sky Blue FC	West Chester, PA
	Lindsey 2'; Rodriguez 28'	Box Score	Kalmari 10'	Stadium: John A. Farrell Stadium; Attendance: 2,585

June 13, 2010 9	Philadelphia Independence	1–3	FC Gold Pride	West Chester, PA
	DiMartino 81'	Box Score	Sinclair 41'; Marta 54', 89'	Stadium: John A. Farrell Stadium; Attendance: 2,616

June 19, 2010 10	Sky Blue FC	1–4	Philadelphia Independence	Piscataway, NJ
	Rosana 27' (pen.); O'Reilly (yellow card) 75'	Box Score	Adams 4'; Rodriguez 18'; Lohman 56'; DiMartino 74'	Stadium: Yurcak Field; Attendance: 3,362

June 23, 2010 11	Atlanta Beat	2–2	Philadelphia Independence	Kennesaw, GA
	Yamaguchi 15'; Ellertson 90'	Box Score	Rodriguez 36'; Bishop 48' (o.g.)	Stadium: Fifth Third Bank Stadium; Attendance: 2,632

June 26, 2010 12	Philadelphia Independence	3–2	Washington Freedom	West Chester, PA
	Wambach 12' (pen.); Rodriguez 62', 72'; Sanderson 90'; DiMartino (yellow card) 90'	Box Score	Mykjåland 2'; Huffman (yellow card) 84'	Stadium: John A. Farrell Stadium; Attendance: 2,488

July 4, 2010 13	Philadelphia Independence	1–2	Boston Breakers	West Chester, PA
	Rodriguez 18'	Box Score	Holiday 46'; Lilly 84'	Stadium: John A. Farrell Stadium; Attendance: 2,093

July 17, 2010 14	FC Gold Pride	2–0	Philadelphia Independence	Hayward, CA
	Sinclair 45', 80'	Box Score		Stadium: Pioneer Stadium; Attendance: 2,576

July 24, 2010 15	Philadelphia Independence	4–1	Sky Blue FC	West Chester, PA
	Lohman 7'; Rodriguez 8', 52'; Magnúsdóttir 21'	Box Score	Taylor 80'	Stadium: John A. Farrell Stadium; Attendance: 2,415

July 28, 2010 16	Philadelphia Independence	3–0	Chicago Red Stars	West Chester, PA
	Rodriguez 12', 25'; Buczkowski (yellow card) 48'; Seger 56'; Magnúsdóttir (red card) 90'	Box Score	Markgraf (yellow card) 81'	Stadium: John A. Farrell Stadium

August 4, 2010 17	Washington Freedom	2–0	Philadelphia Independence	West Chester, PA
	Wambach 39', 41'; Long (yellow card) 79'	Box Score		Stadium: John A. Farrell Stadium; Attendance: 2,118

August 8, 2010 18	Philadelphia Independence	2–2	Boston Breakers	West Chester, PA
	Magnúsdóttir 28', 30' (yellow card) 89'	Box Score	Holiday 25'; Smith 52'	Stadium: John A. Farrell Stadium; Attendance: 3,091

August 11, 2010 19	Chicago Red Stars	1–2	Philadelphia Independence	Bridgeview, IL
	Formiga (yellow card) 37'; Masar 62'; Rapinoe (yellow card) 67'; Spilger (yellow card) 77'; Chapman (yellow card) 90'	Box Score	Rodriguez 53'; Sanderson 78'	Stadium: Toyota Park; Attendance: 3,152

August 15, 2010 20	Philadelphia Independence	3–2	Atlanta Beat	West Chester, PA
	Magnúsdóttir (yellow card) 32'; DiMartino 42', 60'; Lohman 81' (yellow card) 90'	Box Score	Rasmussen 4'; Chalupny 18'	Stadium: John A. Farrell Stadium; Attendance: 2,559

August 22, 2010 21	Sky Blue FC	1–0	Philadelphia Independence	Piscataway, NJ
	Averbuch 61'	Box Score		Stadium: Yurcak Field; Attendance: 2,572

August 29, 2010 22	Philadelphia Independence	1–2	Boston Breakers	West Chester, PA
	Lohman 17'; Johnson (yellow card) 53'; Buczkowski (yellow card) 64'	Box Score	Cox 35'; Smith 60' (pen.) del Rio (yellow card) 84'	Stadium: John A. Farrell Stadium; Attendance: 4,011

September 1, 2010 23	Chicago Red Stars	2–0	Philadelphia Independence	Bridgeview, IL
	Boquete 4'; Chapman (yellow card) 36'; Dougherty 54'	Box Score	Seger (yellow card) 77'	Stadium: Toyota Park; Attendance: 2,173

September 11, 2010 24	FC Gold Pride	4–1	Philadelphia Independence	Hayward, CA
	O'Hara 40', 52'; Marta 41'; Sinclair 65'	Box Score	Sanderson 51'; Krzysik (yellow card) 82'	Stadium: Pioneer Stadium; Attendance: 4,003

==== Results by round ====
Round	1	2	3	4	5	6	7	8	9	10	11	12	13	14	15	16	17	18	19	20	21	22	23	24
Ground	H	A	H	H	A	A	A	H	H	A	A	H	H	A	H	H	A	H	A	H	A	H	A	A
Result	D	D	W	W	L	W	L	W	L	W	D	W	L	L	W	W	L	D	W	W	L	L	L	L

Source: Soccerway
A = Away; H = Home; W = Win; D = Draw; L = Loss

==== Home/away results ====
Overall								Home						Away					
Pld	W	D	L	GF	GA	GD	Pts	W	D	L	GF	GA	GD	W	D	L	GF	GA	GD
24	10	4	10	37	36	+1	34	7	2	3	24	16	+8	3	2	7	13	20	−7

Last updated: 24 February 2018.
Source: Soccerway

==== League table ====
Pos	Team	Pld	W	D	L	GF	GA	GD	Pts	Qualification
1	FC Gold Pride	24	16	5	3	46	19	+27	53	Advance to Championship
2	Boston Breakers	24	10	6	8	36	28	+8	36	Advance to Super Semifinal
3	Philadelphia Independence	24	10	4	10	37	36	+1	34	Advance to First Round
4	Washington Freedom	24	8	7	9	33	33	0	31	Advance to First Round
5	Sky Blue FC	24	7	7	10	20	31	−11	28	

Source: WPS Soccerway
Rules for classification: 1) points, 2) goal difference, 3) head-to-head result.

=== WPS Playoffs ===
19 September 2010 First Round	Philadelphia Independence	1–0	Washington Freedom	West Chester, Pennsylvania
14:30 EDT	Magnúsdóttir (yellow card) 55'; Rodriguez 120'	Box Score		Stadium: John A. Farrell Stadium; Attendance: 2,378

23 September 2010 Super Semifinal	Boston Breakers	1–2	Philadelphia Independence	Boston, Massachusetts
14:30 EDT	Holiday 22'	Box Score	Seger 28'; Buczkowski (yellow card) 58'; Adams 103'	Stadium: Jordan Field; Attendance: 2,676

26 September 2010 WPS Championship	FC Gold Pride	4–0	Philadelphia Independence	Hayward, California
14:30 EDT	Sinclair 16', 53'; Wilson 28'; Marta 90'	Box Score		Stadium: Pioneer Stadium; Attendance: 5,228

== Statistics ==
As of 27 February 2018

Players without any appearance are not included.

No.	Pos	Nat	Player	Total		WPS		WPS Playoffs	
No.	Pos	Nat	Player	Apps	Goals	Apps	Goals	Apps	Goals
Goalkeepers:
	GK	(Canada) CAN	Karina LeBlanc	14	0	14	0	0	0
	GK	(United States) USA	Valerie Henderson	13	0	10	0	3	0
Defenders:
	DF	(United States) USA	Allison Falk	25	2	22	2	3	0
	DF	(Cameroon) CMR	Estelle Johnson	16	0	10+3	0	3	0
	DF	(Sweden) SWE	Sara Larsson	13	0	12+1	0	0	0
	DF	(United States) USA	Heather Mitts	20	0	14+3	0	1+2	0
	DF	(United States) USA	Katherine Reynolds	3	0	3	0	0	0
	DF	(United States) USA	Sarah Senty	11	0	4+6	0	0+1	0
Midfielders:
	MF	(United States) USA	Jen Buczkowski	26	0	20+3	0	3	0
	MF	(United States) USA	Tina DiMartino	19	4	13+3	4	3	0
	MF	(United States) USA	Kelly Henderson	6	0	1+1	0	2+2	0
	MF	(United States) USA	Lori Lindsey	26	2	23	2	3	0
	MF	(United States) USA	Joanna Lohman	24	5	20+4	5	0	0
	MF	(United States) USA	Lyndsey Patterson	15	1	2+13	1	0	0
	MF	(Poland) POL	Nikki Phillips	26	0	22+1	0	3	0
	MF	(Sweden) SWE	Caroline Seger	21	2	17+1	1	3	1
Forwards:
	FW	(United States) USA	Danesha Adams	17	2	4+10	1	0+3	1
	FW	(United States) USA	Gina DiMartino	2	0	0+1	0	0+1	0
	FW	(Iceland) ISL	Hólmfríður Magnúsdóttir	22	3	18+1	3	3	0
	FW	(Japan) JPN	Karina Maruyama	4	0	1+3	0	0	0
	FW	(United States) USA	Carrie Patterson	2	0	0+1	0	1	0
	FW	(United States) USA	Amy Rodriguez	26	13	23	12	3	1
	FW	(England) ENG	Lianne Sanderson	26	5	12+11	5	3	0

== Transfers ==
=== 2010 WPS Draft ===
The 2010 WPS Draft was held on January 15, 2010 in Philadelphia, Pennsylvania where the Independence selected five players.

Player	Pos	Previous club	Notes	Ref
(United States) Malorie Rutledge	MF	(United States) Louisiana State University	Round 2, Pick 2 (13th overall)	
(United States) Kelly Henderson	DF/MF	(United States) Boston College	Round 4, Pick 2 (31st overall)	
(United States) Carrie Patterson	FW	(United States) University of Georgia	Round 5, Pick 2 (40th overall)	
(United States) Jennifer Anzivino	DF/MF	(United States) Rutgers University	Round 6, Pick 2 (49th overall)	
(United States) Caitlin Farrell	DF	(United States) Wake Forest University	Round 7, Pick 2 (58th overall)	
(United States) Danielle Collins	DF/MF	(United States) William & Mary College	Round 7, Pick 6 (62nd overall)	

=== In ===
Date	Player	Position	Previous club	Fee/notes
September 15, 2009	(United States) Lori Lindsey	MF	(United States) Washington Freedom	Expansion Draft, Pick #2
September 15, 2009	(United States) Jen Buczkowski	DF	(United States) Sky Blue FC	Expansion Draft, Pick #3
September 15, 2009	(Poland) Nikki Krzysik	DF	(United States) Chicago Red Stars	Expansion Draft, Pick #5
September 15, 2009	(United States) Sue Weber	DF	(United States) Boston Breakers	Expansion Draft, Pick #7
September 15, 2009	(United States) Sarah Senty	DF	(United States) Washington Freedom	Expansion Draft, Pick #9
September 15, 2009	(United States) Danesha Adams	MF	(United States) Chicago Red Stars	Expansion Draft, Pick #11
September 15, 2009	(United States) Kelly Schmedes	FW	(United States) Boston Breakers	Expansion Draft, Pick #13
September 22, 2009	(Sweden) Charlotte Rohlin	DF	(Sweden) Linköpings FC	International Draft, Pick #3
September 22, 2009	(England) Fara Williams	MF	(England) Everton L.F.C.	International Draft, Pick #7
September 29, 2009	(United States) Amy Rodriguez	FW	(United States) Boston Breakers	Trade for 2009 #1 Draft Pick, 2010 General Draft Pick
January 3, 2010	(Canada) Karina LeBlanc	GK	(United States) Los Angeles Sol	Dispersal Draft, Round 1, Pick #2
January 3, 2010	(Cameroon) Estelle Johnson	DF	(United States) Los Angeles Sol	Dispersal Draft, Round 2, Pick #7
February 4, 2010	(United States) Valerie Henderson	GK	(United States) Los Angeles Sol	Trade for No. 5 and No. 22 picks in 2010 WPS Draft
February 4, 2010	(United States) Allison Falk	DF	(United States) Los Angeles Sol	Trade for No. 5 and No. 22 picks in 2010 WPS Draft
March 5, 2010	(Sweden) Sara Larsson	MF	(United States) Saint Louis Athletica	Expansion Draft
March 5, 2010	(United States) Lyndsey Patterson	MF/FW	(United States) Los Angeles Sol	Signed as Free Agent
March 5, 2010	(Japan) Karina Maruyama	FW	(Japan) TEPCO Mareeze	Signed as International Discovery player
March 5, 2010	(Iceland) Hólmfríður Magnúsdóttir	MF	(Sweden) Kristianstads DFF	International Draft, Pick #5
March 5, 2010	(England) Lianne Sanderson	FW	(England) Chelsea L.F.C.	International Draft, Pick #9
March 5, 2010	(Sweden) Caroline Seger	MF	(Sweden) Linköpings FC	International Draft, Pick #1
March 8, 2010	(United States) Heather Mitts	DF	(United States) Boston Breakers	Signed as Free Agent
	(United States) Joanna Lohman	MF	(United States) Washington Freedom	Signed as Free Agent
	(United States) Robyn Jones	GK	(United States) New Jersey Wildcats	Signed to Developmental Roster
	(United States) Katherine Reynolds	DF	(United States) University of Santa Clara	Signed to Developmental Roster
	(United States) Gina DiMartino	FW	(United States) Boston College	Signed to Developmental Roster
	(United States) Carrie Patterson	FW	(United States) University of Georgia	Signed to Developmental Roster
	(United States) Tina DiMartino	MF	(United States) Saint Louis Athletica	Signed as Free Agent

=== Out ===
Date	Player	Position	Destination club	Fee/notes
October 2, 2009	(United States) Kelly Schmedes	DF		Waived
February 26, 2010	(United States) Sue Weber	DF		Waived
March 1, 2010	(Sweden) Charlotte Rohlin	DF	(Sweden) Linköpings FC	Declined move to WPS
March 10, 2010	(England) Fara Williams	DF	(England) Everton L.F.C.	Declined move to WPS

== Awards ==
=== Player of the Week ===
Week	Player of the Week	Week's Statline
Week 3	(United States) Lori Lindsey	3 A
Week 8	(United States) Amy Rodriguez	2 G
Week 10	(United States) Danesha Adams	1 G, 2A
Week 15	(Sweden) Caroline Seger	3 A
Week 18	(United States) Tina DiMartino	2 G

=== Player of the Month ===
Month	Player of the Month	Month's Statline
April	(United States) Lori Lindsey	4 A
June	(United States) Amy Rodriguez	5 G, 2 A

=== WPS year-end awards ===
Award	Player	Notes
Coach of the Year	(England) Paul Riley	3rd-place finish in inaugural season and playoff final

==== 2010 WPS Best XI ====
Player	Position
(United States) Lori Lindsey	Defense
(United States) Amy Rodriguez	Forward

== See also ==
- 2010 Women's Professional Soccer season
