= 2011 Philadelphia Independence season =

Philadelphia Independence
2011 season
- Owner: (United States) Team Dynamics, LLC
- Head coach: (England) Paul Riley
- Stadium: Leslie Quick Stadium; Chester, Pennsylvania (Capacity: 4,500)
- Women's Professional Soccer: 2nd
- WPS Playoffs: Runners-up
- Top goalscorer: Tasha Kai (9)
- Highest home attendance: 4,162 (Aug. 7 vs. Sky Blue FC)
- Lowest home attendance: 1,996 (July 6 vs. Sky Blue FC)
- Average home league attendance: 2,774
- Biggest win: 6-0 (June 19 vs. magicJack)
- Biggest defeat: 0-2 (July 23 at Sky Blue FC)
Home colors	Away colors
- All statistics correct as of June 15, 2017.

The 2011 Philadelphia Independence season was the team's second and final season in the Women's Professional Soccer league, and its final season as a team.

== Review ==
The Independence traded Karina LeBlanc to the Chicago Red Stars to move up to the second overall pick in the 2011 WPS Draft and midfielder Caroline Seger to the expansion Western New York Flash for their first pick in the draft's second round. The Independence selected University of Virginia midfielder Sinead Farrelly with the acquired first-round pick. The Independence would select seven players in the draft, more than any other team in the 6-team league. It also signed goalkeeper Nicole Barnhart on February 24, 2011, after the dissolution of FC Gold Pride.

The team also changed home venues, moving from West Chester University to Widener University.

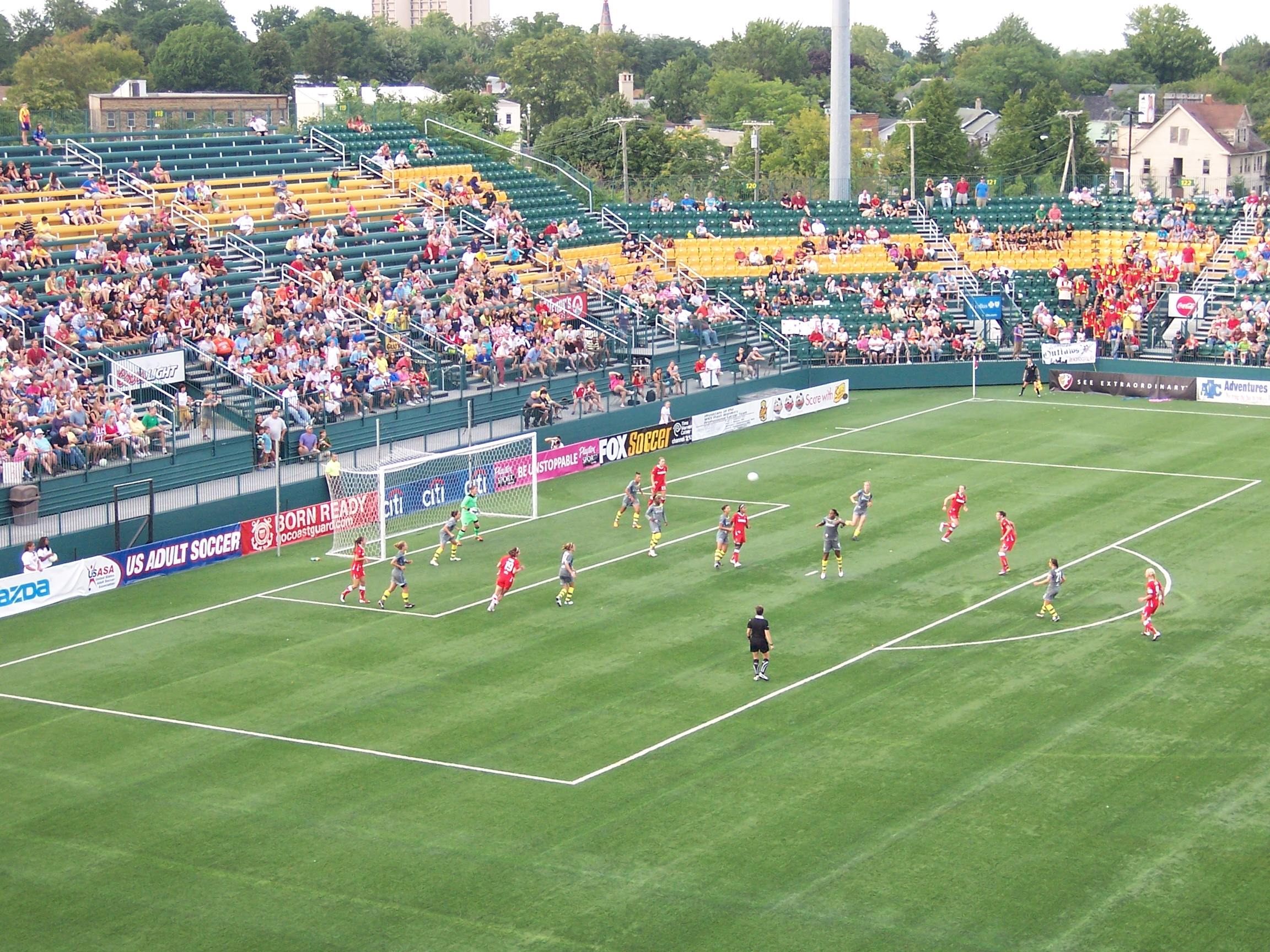
The Independence in action during the 2011 Women's Professional Soccer Championship Game against the Western New York Flash at Sahlen's Stadium in Rochester, New York.

The Independence finished second in league play, won the WPS Super Semifinal 2–0 over magicJack, then drew the Western New York Flash in the 2011 WPS championship after extra time, losing in penalties 5–4. Head coach Paul Riley was named WPS Coach of the Year for the second consecutive season, and Verónica Boquete was named Player of the Year.

This was the team's final season, as it dissolved in 2012 along with the Women's Professional Soccer league itself. Many of its players and staff would go on to other teams that moved to different leagues, while others appeared in the next fully professional women's soccer league, the National Women's Soccer League, after it launched in 2013.

== Squad ==
=== Roster ===
As of September 26, 2011

Note: Flags indicate national team as defined under FIFA eligibility rules; some limited exceptions apply. Players may hold more than one non-FIFA nationality.

No.	Pos.	Nation	Player
0	FW	USA	Tasha Kai
1	GK	USA	Val Henderson
3	DF	USA	Allison Falk
4	MF	USA	Jen Buczkowski
6	MF	USA	Lori Lindsey
7	DF	USA	Leigh Ann Robinson
8	FW	USA	Amy Rodriguez
9	FW	USA	Danesha Adams
10	FW	ENG	Lianne Sanderson
13	FW	ESP	Laura del Rio
14	MF	USA	Sinead Farrelly

No.	Pos.	Nation	Player
15	DF	USA	Nikki Krzysik
16	DF	USA	Kia McNeill
17	MF	USA	Joanna Lohman
20	FW	USA	Gina DiMartino
21	FW	ESP	Verónica Boquete
22	DF	USA	Lauren Barnes
23	GK	USA	Nicole Barnhart
24	DF	CMR	Estelle Johnson
25	MF	USA	Tina DiMartino
28	DF	USA	Lauren Fowlkes
39	GK	USA	Robyn Jones

=== Team management ===
Position	Staff
Head coach	(England) Paul Riley
Assistant coach	(United States) Paul Royal
Assistant coach	(United States) Skip Thorp
Strength and conditioning coach	(United States) Mike Demakis

Last updated: November 10, 2011
Source: WPS

== Competitions ==
=== Women's Professional Soccer ===
==== Regular season ====
April 10, 2011 1	Sky Blue FC	2-2	Philadelphia Independence	Piscataway, NJ
		Report		Stadium: Yurcak Field; Attendance: 2,910; Referee: Daniel Radford; Assistant referees: Emilie Buse, Robert Sibiga; Fourth official: Katja Koroleva

April 16, 2011 2	Philadelphia Independence	v	magicJack	Chester, PA
		Report		Stadium: Leslie Quick Stadium
Note: Postponed to June 25 due to rain and lightning.

May 1, 2011 3	magicJack	2-1	Philadelphia Independence	Boca Raton, FL
		Report		Stadium: FAU Soccer Stadium; Attendance: 1,008

May 8, 2011 4	Philadelphia Independence	2-0	Boston Breakers	Chester, PA
		Report		Stadium: Leslie Quick Stadium; Attendance: 2,128; Referee: Patrick Baker; Assistant referees: Emilie Buse, Katja Koroleva; Fourth official: Eric Weisbrod

May 15, 2011 5	Atlanta Beat	1-2	Philadelphia Independence	Kennesaw, GA
		Report		Stadium: KSU Soccer Stadium; Attendance: 6,125; Referee: Ted Unkel; Assistant referees: Amy Mahan, Justin Brown; Fourth official: Veronica Brito

May 22, 2011 6	Boston Breakers	1-1	Philadelphia Independence	Cambridge, MA
		Report		Stadium: Harvard Stadium; Attendance: 6,128

May 29, 2011 7	Philadelphia Independence	1-2	Western New York Flash	Chester, PA
		Report		Stadium: Leslie Quick Stadium; Attendance: 3,456; Referee: Christina Ibanez; Assistant referees: Tori Hancock, Ross Kleinstuber; Fourth official: Darth Newman

June 4, 2011 8	Philadelphia Independence	0-0	Atlanta Beat	Chester, PA
		Report		Stadium: Leslie Quick Stadium; Attendance: 2,127; Referee: Margaret Domka; Assistant referees: Angela Ianni, Eric Weisbrod; Fourth official: Kevin Klinger

June 12, 2011 9	Western New York Flash	0-1	Philadelphia Independence	Rochester, NY
		Report		Stadium: Sahlen's Stadium; Attendance: 2,397; Referee: Daniel Radford; Assistant referees: Kristen Schiereck, Ashley Cedro; Fourth official: Amanda Ross

June 18, 2011 10	Philadelphia Independence	6-0	magicJack	Chester, PA
		Report		Stadium: Leslie Quick Stadium; Attendance: 2,138; Referee: Ted Unkel; Assistant referees: Mark Buda, Ross Kleinstuber; Fourth official: Darth Newman

June 25, 2011 2	Philadelphia Independence	3-1	magicJack	Chester, PA
		Report		Stadium: Leslie Quick Stadium; Attendance: 2,281; Referee: Margaret Domka; Assistant referees: Melanie Johnson, Ross Kleinstuber; Fourth official: Stanford Nagle III
Note: Rescheduled from April 16 due to rain and lightning.

July 6, 2011 11	Philadelphia Independence	4-3	Sky Blue FC	Chester, PA
		Report		Stadium: Leslie Quick Stadium; Attendance: 1,996; Referee: Felisha Mariscal; Assistant referees: Juliana Duncan, Angela Ianni; Fourth official: Ross Kleinstuber

July 9, 2011 12	Philadelphia Independence	2-1	Western New York Flash	Chester, PA
		Report		Stadium: Leslie Quick Stadium; Attendance: 2,556; Referee: Patrick Baker; Assistant referees: Amanda Ross, Molly Cunningham; Fourth official: Brian Dunn

July 16, 2011 13	Atlanta Beat	0-1	Philadelphia Independence	Kennesaw, GA
		Report		Stadium: KSU Soccer Stadium; Attendance: 3,742; Referee: Patrick Baker; Assistant referees: Talha Dikgitmetz, Mark Cleland; Fourth official: Mark Asauro

July 23, 2011 14	Sky Blue FC	2-0	Philadelphia Independence	Piscataway, NJ
		Report		Stadium: Yurcak Field; Attendance: 1,593; Referee: Stephanie Toth; Assistant referees: Shelley Finger, Ross Kleinstuber; Fourth official: Darth Newman

July 27, 2011 15	Boston Breakers	0-1	Philadelphia Independence	Cambridge, MA
		Report		Stadium: Harvard Stadium; Attendance: 3,343; Referee: Moo Hackett; Assistant referees: Ross Wolf, Scott Kachmarik; Fourth official: Kara Hahnthumb

July 31, 2011 16	Philadelphia Independence	1-0	Atlanta Beat	Chester, PA
		Report		Stadium: Leslie Quick Stadium; Attendance: 4,162; Referee: Christina Ibanez

August 7, 2011 17	Philadelphia Independence	2-1	Sky Blue FC	Chester, PA
		Report		Stadium: Leslie Quick Stadium; Attendance: 4,162; Referee: Ted Unkel; Assistant referees: Emilie Buse, Bryan Roslund; Fourth official: Stanford Nagle III

August 14, 2011 18	magicJack	2-1	Philadelphia Independence	Boca Raton, FL
		Report		Stadium: FAU Soccer Stadium; Attendance: 3,063

==== Results by round ====
Round	1	2	3	4	5	6	7	8	9	10	11	12	13	14	15	16	17	18
Ground	A	H	A	H	A	A	H	H	A	H	H	H	A	A	A	H	H	A
Result	D	W	L	W	W	D	L	D	W	W	W	W	W	L	W	W	W	L

Updated to match(es) played on August 22, 2011. Source: WPS
A = Away; H = Home; W = Win; D = Draw; L = Loss

==== Home/away results ====
Overall								Home						Away					
Pld	W	D	L	GF	GA	GD	Pts	W	D	L	GF	GA	GD	W	D	L	GF	GA	GD
18	11	3	4	31	18	+13	36	7	1	1	21	8	+13	4	2	3	10	10	0

Last updated: August 22, 2011.
Source: WPS

==== League table ====
Pos	Team	Pld	W	D	L	GF	GA	GD	Pts	Promotion or relegation
1	Western New York Flash	18	13	3	2	40	18	+22	42	Advance to Championship
2	Philadelphia Independence	18	11	3	4	31	18	+13	36	Advance to Super Semifinal
3	magicJack	18	9	2	7	29	29	0	28 (Note: magicJack were deducted a point for various league violations.)	Advance to First round
4	Boston Breakers	18	5	4	9	19	24	−5	19 (Note: BOS: 7 pts; SKY: 4 pt)	Advance to First round
5	Sky Blue FC	18	5	4	9	24	29	−5	19	
6	Atlanta Beat	18	1	4	13	7	32	−25	7	

Updated to match(es) played on unknown. Source: soccerway
Rules for classification: 1) points, 2) goal difference, 3) head-to-head result.

=== WPS Playoffs ===
August 20, 2011 Super Semifinal	Philadelphia Independence	2-0	magicJack	Chester, PA
		Report		Stadium: PPL Park; Attendance: 5,410; Referee: Ted Unkel; Assistant referees: Marlene Duffy, Ross Kleinstuber; Fourth official: Katja Koroleva

August 27, 2011 WPS Championship	Western New York Flash	1-1 (a.e.t.) (5-4 p)	Philadelphia Independence	Rochester, NY
4:00 p.m. (EST)	Edwards (yellow card) 25'; Sinclair 64'; Goebel (yellow card) 96' (yellow-red card) 108'; Marta (yellow card) 103'	Report	Rodriguez 88', (yellow card) 90+3'	Stadium: Sahlen's Stadium; Attendance: 10,461; Referee: Kari Seitz; Assistant referees: Russell Wolf, Juliana Duncan; Fourth official: Robert Sibiga
	Penalties
	Marta (penalty scored); Sinclair (penalty scored); Zerboni (penalty scored); Seger (penalty scored); Averbuch (penalty scored)		(penalty scored) Sanderson; (penalty scored) Adams; (penalty scored) Robinson; (penalty scored) Boquete; (penalty missed) del Rio

== Squad statistics ==
Source: WPS

Squad statistics are of the regular season only.

N	Pos	Player	GP	GS	Min	G	A	PK	Shot	SOG	SOG%	Foul	FS	YC	RC
0	F	Tasha Kai	17	16	1234	9	1	0	49	28	57.14%	9	19	1	0
4	M	Jen Buczkowski	18	18	1620	0	0	0	7	3	42.86%	18	9	1	0
6	M	Lori Lindsey	9	1	254	0	0	0	5	3	60.00%	2	1	0	0
7	D	Leigh Ann Robinson	17	17	1530	0	2	0	5	0	0.00%	4	4	0	0
8	F	Amy Rodriguez	10	6	641	2	0	0	19	8	42.11%	5	9	0	0
10	F	Lianne Sanderson	17	8	670	3	3	1	19	12	63.16%	5	9	1	0
13	F	Laura del Rio	15	3	471	2	3	0	29	19	65.52%	2	4	0	0
14	M	Sinead Farrelly	14	13	1101	1	2	0	13	8	61.54%	7	5	1	0
15	M	Nikki Krzysik	18	18	1620	0	0	0	0	0	—	14	3	1	0
16	D	Kia McNeill	17	17	1453	1	0	0	7	6	85.71%	12	6	1	1
17	D	Joanna Lohman	9	6	495	0	2	0	11	4	36.36%	6	11	1	0
19	M	Danesha Adams	13	8	703	3	1	0	20	13	65.00%	6	12	1	0
21	F	Verónica Boquete	11	10	902	5	4	0	29	21	72.41%	5	12	0	0
24	D	Estelle Johnson	15	13	1194	1	1	0	5	2	40.00%	4	4	0	0
25	M	Tina DiMartino	18	18	1429	2	1	0	18	8	44.44%	4	9	0	0
26	F	Holmfridur Magnusdottir	12	6	586	1	1	0	10	3	30.00%	11	1	2	0
Team Total			230	178	15903	30	21	1	246	138	56.10%	114	118	10	1

N	Pos	Goal keeper	GP	GS	Min	GA	GA/G	PKA	PKF	Shot	Sav	Sho
23	GK	Nicole Barnhart	9	9	810	10	1.11	1	2	49	37	3
1	GK	Val Henderson	9	9	810	8	0.89	1	1	28	20	4
Team Total			18	18	1620	18	2.00	2	3	77	57	7

== Transfers ==
=== 2011 WPS Draft ===
Player	Pos	Previous club	Notes	Ref
(United States) Sinead Farrelly	MF	(United States) University of Virginia	Round 1, Pick #2	
(United States) Lauren Fowlkes	DF	(United States) University of Notre Dame	Round 5, Pick #5	
(United States) Jennifer Stoltenberg	FW	(United States) University of Oregon	Round 2, Pick #9	
(United States) Caitlin Farrell	DF	(United States) Wake Forest University	Round 2, Pick #11	
(United States) Lauren Barnes	DF	(United States) University of California, Los Angeles	Round 3, Pick #15	
(United States) Bianca D'Agostino	MF	(United States) Wake Forest University	Round 3, Pick #18	
(United States) Teresa Rynier	MF	(United States) James Madison University	Round 4, Pick #23	

=== In ===
Date	Player	Position	Previous club	Fee/notes
December 22, 2010	(United States) Tasha Kai	FW	(United States) Sky Blue FC	Signed
December 27, 2010	(United States) Megan Rapinoe	MF	(United States) Chicago Red Stars	Signed as free agent
January 31, 2011	(Spain) Verónica Boquete	FW	(Spain) RCD Espanyol	Signed, joined at conclusion of 2010–11 Superliga Femenina
January 31, 2011	(Spain) Laura del Rio	FW	(United States) Boston Breakers	Trade
February 22, 2011	(United States) Nicole Barnhart	GK	(United States) FC Gold Pride	Signed as free agent
March 24, 2011	(United States) Sinead Farrelly	MF	(United States) University of Virginia	Signed draft pick
March 24, 2011	(United States) Gina DiMartino	FW	(United States) Boston College	Signed to main roster
April 1, 2011	(United States) Lauren Barnes	DF	(United States) UCLA	Signed draft pick
April 4, 2011	(United States) Lauren Fowlkes	DF	(United States) Notre Dame	Signed draft pick
April 6, 2011	(United States) Robyn Jones	GK	(United States) New Jersey Wildcats	Signed to main roster
	(United States) Leigh Ann Robinson	DF	(United States) Atlanta Beat	Signed

=== Out ===
Date	Player	Position	Destination club	Fee/notes
October 12, 2010	(Canada) Karina LeBlanc	GK	(United States) Chicago Red Stars	Traded for 1st- and 3rd-round picks in 2011 WPS Draft.
November 8, 2010	(United States) Lyndsey Patterson	MF/FW	(United States) Atlanta Beat	Waived
November 8, 2010	(United States) Sarah Senty	DF		Waived
December 22, 2010	(Sweden) Caroline Seger	FW	(United States) Western New York Flash	Traded for 2nd-round picks in 2011 and 2012 WPS Drafts.
January 15, 2011	(United States) Heather Mitts	DF	(United States) Atlanta Beat	Traded for 3rd-round pick in 2012 WPS Draft.
June 21, 2011	(United States) Megan Rapinoe	MF	(United States) magicJack	Traded in exchange for cash considerations.
July 25, 2011	(Iceland) Hólmfríður Magnúsdóttir	MF/FW	(Iceland) Valur	Mutually terminated rights

== Awards ==
=== Player of the Week ===
Week	Player of the Week	Week's Statline
Week 11	(Spain) Verónica Boquete	3 A, 1 G
Week 13	(United States) Natasha Kai	3 G
Week 13	(United States) Natasha Kai	1 G
Week 14	(Spain) Verónica Boquete	1 G
Week 16	(Spain) Verónica Boquete	1 G, GWG
Week 16	(Spain) Verónica Boquete	1 G, GWG

=== WPS year-end awards ===
Award	Player	Notes
Michelle Akers Player of the Year	(Spain) Verónica Boquete	Also earned league's top honor as MVP
WPS Coach of the Year	(England) Paul Riley	Led his team to a seven-game unbeaten streak and playoff final
Citi Sportswoman of the Year	(United States) Nikki Krzysik	Team captain selected by her peers for exemplary leadership

Source: 2011 WPS Year End Awards

==== 2011 WPS Best XI ====
Player	Position
(United States) Kia McNeill	Defense
(Poland) Nikki Krzysik	Defense
(Spain) Verónica Boquete *	Midfield
(United States) Jen Buczkowski	Midfield

* – unanimous selection
Source: WPS Announces Best XI of 2011

== See also ==
- 2011 Women's Professional Soccer season
- 2011 Women's Professional Soccer Playoffs
