= 2009 WPS expansion draft =

The 2009 WPS Expansion Draft was a special draft for the Women's Professional Soccer teams Atlanta Beat and Philadelphia Independence, taking place on September 15, 2009. Each expansion team made 9 selections from the existing seven WPS teams.

== Format ==
Official WPS release

- Existing teams may protect up to 10 players, but must leave a minimum of 6 unprotected. (Free agents are not included in either category.)
- Expansion teams must each select one player from each existing team prior to selecting a second player from an existing team. This will also hold true after a 2nd player is selected from an existing team: each expansion team must select from each existing team twice prior to selecting a 3rd player from an existing team.
- Existing teams may protect two after losing their first player.
- Existing teams may protect one after losing their second player.
- An existing team may not lose more than three players.
- Expansion teams may each select a total of nine players.
- A coin flip will decide which expansion team picks first and fourth, while the other team picks second and third. Picking will alternate after the fourth pick.

== Expansion draft results ==
WPS official results

#	Team	Player	Previous Team
1	Atlanta Beat	(United States) Leigh Ann Robinson (D)	FC Gold Pride
2	Philadelphia Independence	(United States) Lori Lindsey (M)	Washington Freedom
3	Philadelphia Independence	(United States) Jen Buczkowski (D)	Sky Blue FC
4	Atlanta Beat	(United States) Amanda Cinalli (F)	Saint Louis Athletica
5	Philadelphia Independence	(United States) Nikki Krzysik (D)	Chicago Red Stars
6	Atlanta Beat	(United States) Katie Larkin (D)	Los Angeles Sol
7	Philadelphia Independence	(United States) Sue Weber (D)	Boston Breakers
8	Atlanta Beat	(Canada) Sharolta Nonen (D)	Los Angeles Sol
9	Philadelphia Independence	(United States) Sarah Senty (D)	Washington Freedom
10	Atlanta Beat	(Sweden) Sara Larsson (D)	Saint Louis Athletica
11	Philadelphia Independence	(United States) Danesha Adams (F)	Chicago Red Stars
12	Atlanta Beat	(United States) Noelle Keselica (F)	Sky Blue FC
13	Philadelphia Independence	(United States) Kelly Schmedes (F)	Boston Breakers
14	Atlanta Beat	pass	
15	Philadelphia Independence	pass	end draft
16	Atlanta Beat		
17	Philadelphia Independence		
18	Atlanta Beat		

== Team-by-team breakdown ==
Boston Breakers

- Sue Weber #7 (PHI)
- Kelly Schmedes #13 (PHI)
- -

FC Gold Pride

- Leigh Ann Robinson #1 (ATL)
- -
- -

Saint Louis Athletica

- Amanda Cinalli #4 (ATL)
- Sara Larsson #10 (ATL)
- -

Washington Freedom

- Lori Lindsey #2 (PHI)
- Sarah Senty #9 (PHI)
- -

Chicago Red Stars

- Nikki Krzysik #5 (PHI)
- Danesha Adams #11 (PHI)
- -

Los Angeles Sol

- Katie Larkin #6 (ATL)
- Sharolta Nonen #8 (ATL)
- -

Sky Blue FC

- Jen Buczkowski #3 (PHI)
- Noelle Keselica #12 (ATL)
- -
