= Annual Women's Professional Soccer awards =

Women's Professional Soccer hands out a number of yearly awards. Six were awarded from the start in 2009 and one more, the Rookie of the year award, was added in 2010.

The first five awards listed are voted on by fans, players & coaches, and media, each group accounting for 33% of the total vote.

== Player of the Year Award ==
The Michelle Akers Player of the Year Award is a soccer award for players in Women's Professional Soccer. The award is given to the player deemed the most valuable player in the league each season. It is named after former USA great Michelle Akers.

- 2009 – (Brazil) Marta, Los Angeles Sol
- 2010 – (Brazil) Marta, FC Gold Pride
- 2011 – (Spain) Verónica Boquete, Philadelphia Independence

== Coach of the Year ==
The Coach of the Year Award is an award given by Women's Professional Soccer to the best coach in any given season. The award has been given since the league's inception in 2009.

- 2009 – (United States) Abner Rogers, Los Angeles Sol
- 2010 – (England) Paul Riley, Philadelphia Independence
- 2011 – (England) Paul Riley, Philadelphia Independence

== Goalkeeper of the Year ==
Women's Professional Soccer (WPS) has handed out a Goalkeeper of the Year Award (currently the Coast Guard Goalkeeper of the Year for sponsorship reasons) since 2009.

- 2009 – (United States) Hope Solo, Saint Louis Athletica
- 2010 – (United States) Nicole Barnhart, FC Gold Pride
- 2011 – (United States) Ashlyn Harris, Western New York Flash

== Defender of the Year ==
Women's Professional Soccer (WPS) has handed out a Defender of the Year award since its inception in 2009.

- 2009 – (United States) Amy LePeilbet, Boston Breakers
- 2010 – (United States) Amy LePeilbet, Boston Breakers
- 2011 – (United States) Whitney Engen, Western New York Flash

== Rookie of the Year ==
Women's Professional Soccer (WPS) has handed out a Rookie of the Year Award (currently the U.S. Soccer Federation Rookie of the Year) since 2010. It is awarded to the most outstanding player in the league who recently graduated from college.

- 2010 – (New Zealand) Ali Riley, FC Gold Pride
- 2011 – (United States) Christen Press, magicJack

== Golden Boot award ==
The WPS Golden Boot (currently the PUMA Golden Boot for sponsorship reasons) has been awarded since the 2009 to Women's Professional Soccer's regular season leading scorer. First tiebreaker is number of games played.

	Winner			Runner-up		
Season	Player	Club	Goals	Player	Club	Goals
2009	(Brazil) Marta	Los Angeles Sol	10	(France) Camille Abily	Los Angeles Sol	8
2010	(Brazil) Marta	FC Gold Pride	19	(United States) Abby Wambach	Washington Freedom	13
2011	(Brazil) Marta	Western New York Flash	10	(Canada) Christine Sinclair	Western New York Flash	10

== Sportswoman of the Year ==
Women's Professional Soccer (WPS) has handed out a Sportswoman of the Year award (currently the Citi Sportswoman of the Year for sponsorship reasons) since 2009. This award is voted on solely by players and coaches.

- 2009 – (United States) Christie Rampone, Sky Blue FC
- 2010 – (United States) Natalie Spilger, Chicago Red Stars
- 2011 – (United States) Nikki Krzysik, Philadelphia Independence

== See also ==
- List of sports awards honoring women
