= Lisa Sari =

American soccer player

Personal information
- Full name: Lisa Anne Sari
- Date of birth: October 18, 1984 (age 42)
- Place of birth: Longview, Washington, United States
- Height: 5 ft 7 in (1.70 m)
- Position: Midfielder

College career
Years	Team	Apps	(Gls)
2003–2006	Portland Pilots		

Senior career*
Years	Team	Apps	(Gls)
2008	Seattle Sounders	7	(2)
2009	Los Angeles Sol	5	(0)
- * Club domestic league appearances and goals

Lisa Anne Sari (born October 18, 1984) is an American soccer midfielder who last played for Los Angeles Sol of Women's Professional Soccer. She also coaches FC Portland.
