= 2011 Women's Professional Soccer season =

Women's Professional Soccer
- Season: 2011
- Champions: Western New York Flash
- Matches: 54
- Goals: 150 (2.78 per match)
- Top goalscorer: Marta, WNY; Christine Sinclair, WNY (10)
- Biggest home win: PHI 6–0 mJ
- Biggest away win: ATL 1–4 BOS; NJ 1–4 WNY
- Highest scoring: PHI 4–3 NJ
- Highest attendance: 15,404 WNY vs. mJ (July 20)
- Lowest attendance: 864 mJ vs. ATL (May 29)
- Average attendance: 3,518

The 2011 Women's Professional Soccer season is the third season for the WPS, the top level professional women's soccer league in the United States. The season started with the opening match on April 9, with the 2011 WPS Championship scheduled for the weekend of August 27–28.

== Changes from the 2010 Season ==
- Defending champions FC Gold Pride will not return for the 2011 season.
- Also not returning for the 2011 season are Chicago Red Stars, which were given a month's deadline to find investors after the original announcement of the teams, but failed to achieve so. The Red Stars will spend 2011 regrouping in the WPSL.
- New to the league are the Western New York Flash, who are playing in Rochester, New York.
- Due to a change in ownership, the Washington Freedom were renamed "magicJack", and also moved from the Washington area to Boca Raton in South Florida.

== Competition Format/Schedule ==
- The regular season will begin on April 9 and end on August 14, with most teams playing few games during the 2011 FIFA Women's World Cup. The playoffs will be held during the last two weeks of August and end with the WPS Championship presented by Citi on either August 27 or 28.
- Each team will play a total of eighteen games, two at home and two away against every other team minus one home game for one opponent and one away game for a different opponent.
- The playoff format was identical to that of the 2010 season. The four teams with the most points from the regular season qualified for the playoffs. The third- and fourth-placed regular season finishers played each other in the single-match First Round, with the winner traveling to face the second-placed regular season finisher in the Super Semifinal midweek. The Super Semifinal winner then traveled to face the first-placed regular season finisher in the WPS Championship.

Abbreviation and Color Key: Atlanta Beat – ATL • Boston Breakers – BOS • magicJack – mJ Philadelphia Independence – PHI • Sky Blue FC – NJ • Western New York Flash – WNY Win • Loss • Tie • Home
Club	Match																	
Club	1	2	3	4	5	6	7	8	9	10	11	12	13	14	15	16	17	18
Atlanta Beat	BOS	NJ	WNY	WNY	mJ	PHI	NJ	mJ	PHI	mJ	BOS	NJ	BOS	PHI	mJ	PHI	WNY	WNY
Atlanta Beat	1–4	1–0	2–2	3–0	2–0	1–2	3–0	4–0	0–0	2–3	0–0	1–0	2–0	0–1	0–0	1–0	0–2	2–0
Boston Breakers	ATL	WNY	mJ	NJ	PHI	WNY	PHI	NJ	mJ	NJ	ATL	ATL	WNY	PHI	mJ	WNY	mJ	NJ
Boston Breakers	1–4	1–2	1–0	1–0	2–0	3–2	1–1	2–1	2–1	0–0	0–0	2–0	2–2	0–1	4–0	2–1	0–2	2–0
magicJack	BOS	PHI	ATL	WNY	ATL	BOS	ATL	PHI	PHI	NJ	WNY	ATL	NJ	BOS	NJ	BOS	WNY	PHI
magicJack	1–0	2–1	2–0	3–0	4–0	2–1	2–3	6–0	3–1	2–2	3–1	0–0	0–2	4–0	3–2	0–2	1–2	2–1
Philadelphia Independence	NJ	mJ	BOS	ATL	BOS	WNY	ATL	WNY	mJ	mJ	NJ	WNY	ATL	NJ	BOS	ATL	NJ	mJ
Philadelphia Independence	2–2	2–1	2–0	1–2	1–1	1–2	0–0	0–1	6–0	3–1	4–3	2–1	0–1	2–0	0–1	1–0	2–1	2–1
Sky Blue FC	PHI	ATL	BOS	WNY	ATL	BOS	WNY	BOS	ATL	PHI	mJ	WNY	PHI	mJ	WNY	mJ	PHI	BOS
Sky Blue FC	2–2	1–0	1–0	3–1	3–0	2–1	2–2	0–0	1–0	4–3	2–2	0–2	2–0	0–2	1–4	3–2	2–1	2–0
Western New York Flash	BOS	ATL	ATL	NJ	BOS	mJ	PHI	NJ	PHI	PHI	NJ	mJ	BOS	NJ	BOS	ATL	mJ	ATL
Western New York Flash	1–2	2–2	3–0	3–1	3–2	3–0	1–2	2–2	0–1	2–1	0–2	3–1	2–2	1–4	2–1	0–2	1–2	2–0

== Standings ==
Pos	Team	Pld	W	D	L	GF	GA	GD	Pts	Promotion or relegation
1	Western New York Flash	18	13	3	2	40	18	+22	42	Advance to Championship
2	Philadelphia Independence	18	11	3	4	31	18	+13	36	Advance to Super Semifinal
3	magicJack	18	9	2	7	29	29	0	28 (Note: magicJack were deducted a point for various league violations.)	Advance to First round
4	Boston Breakers	18	5	4	9	19	24	−5	19 (Note: BOS: 7 pts; SKY: 4 pt)	Advance to First round
5	Sky Blue FC	18	5	4	9	24	29	−5	19	
6	Atlanta Beat	18	1	4	13	7	32	−25	7	

Updated to match(es) played on unknown. Source: soccerway
Rules for classification: 1) points, 2) goal difference, 3) head-to-head result.

== Playoffs ==
First Round; August 17, 2011
3	magicJack	3
4	Boston Breakers	1

Super Semifinal; August 20, 2011
2	Philadelphia Independence	2
3	magicJack	0

WPS Championship; August 27, 2011
1	Western New York Flash	1(5)
2	Philadelphia Independence	1(4)

== Awards ==
=== Player of the Week ===
Week	Player of the Week	Club	Week's Statline
Week 1	(United States) Allie Long	Sky Blue FC	NJ 2–2 PHI
Week 2	(United States) Allison Lipsher	Atlanta Beat	11 SVS, SHO
Week 3	(United States) Allison Lipsher	Atlanta Beat	10 SVS
Week 4	(Canada) Christine Sinclair	Western New York Flash	2 G, GWG
Week 5	(Brazil) Marta	Western New York Flash	2 A, 1 G, GWA
Week 6	(United States) McCall Zerboni	Western New York Flash	1 A, 2 G, GWG
Week 7	(Sweden) Caroline Seger	Western New York Flash	2 G
Week 8	(United States) Abby Wambach	magicJack	3 G, GWG
Week 9	(United States) Meghan Klingenberg	Boston Breakers	1 A, 1 G, GWG
Week 10	(United States) Alyssa Naeher	Boston Breakers	6 SVS, SHO
Week 11	(Spain) Verónica Boquete	Philadelphia Independence	3 A, 1 G
Week 12	(United States) Casey Nogueira	Sky Blue FC	1 G, GWG
Week 13	(United States) Natasha Kai	Philadelphia Independence	3 G
Week 13	(United States) Natasha Kai	Philadelphia Independence	1 G
Week 14	(Spain) Verónica Boquete	Philadelphia Independence	1 G
Week 15	(Canada) Christine Sinclair	Western New York Flash	1 A, 2 G, GWG
Week 15	(Canada) Christine Sinclair	Western New York Flash	BOS 2–2 WNY
Week 16	(Spain) Verónica Boquete	Philadelphia Independence	1 G, GWG
Week 16	(Spain) Verónica Boquete	Philadelphia Independence	1 G, GWG
Week 17	(United States) Abby Wambach	magicJack	2 G
Week 17	(United States) Abby Wambach	magicJack	2 G, GWG
Week 18	(United States) Lauren Cheney	Boston Breakers	2 G, GWG

=== Player of the Month ===
Month	Player of the Month	Club	Month's Statline
May	(United States) McCall Zerboni	Western New York Flash	2 G, 2 A in 5 games; Flash 5–0 in May
June			
July			

=== WPS Year End Awards ===
Award	Player	Club	Notes
Michelle Akers Player of the Year	(Spain) Verónica Boquete	Philadelphia Independence	Also earned league’s top honor as MVP
WPS Defender of the Year	(United States) Whitney Engen	Western New York Flash	Started and played the full 90 in all but one game
US Coast Guard Goalkeeper of the Year	(United States) Ashlyn Harris	Western New York Flash	Led the league in regular season goals per game average (1.00)
US Soccer Federation Rookie of the Year	(United States) Christen Press	magicJack	First-ever hat trick scored by a rookie on July 30, 2011
WPS Coach of the Year	(England) Paul Riley	Philadelphia Independence	Led his team to a seven-game unbeaten streak and playoff final
Citi Sportswoman of the Year	(United States) Nikki Krzysik	Philadelphia Independence	Team captain selected by her peers for exemplary leadership
PUMA Golden Boot (Top Scorer)	(Brazil) Marta	Western New York Flash	Scored ten goals, earning her third consecutive award

Source: 2011 WPS Year End Awards

==== 2011 WPS Best XI ====
Player	Position	Squad
(United States) Ashlyn Harris	Goalkeeper	Western New York Flash
(United States) Whitney Engen *	Defense	Western New York Flash
(United States) Kia McNeill	Defense	Philadelphia Independence
(Poland) Nikki Krzysik	Defense	Philadelphia Independence
(New Zealand) Ali Riley	Defense	Western New York Flash
(Spain) Veronica Boquete *	Midfield	Philadelphia Independence
(Sweden) Caroline Seger	Midfield	Western New York Flash
(United States) Jen Buczkowski	Midfield	Philadelphia Independence
(Canada) Christine Sinclair *	Forward	Western New York Flash
(Brazil) Marta	Forward	Western New York Flash
(United States) Abby Wambach	Forward	magicJack

* – unanimous selection
Source: WPS Announces Best XI of 2011

== Statistics ==
=== Scoring ===
- First Goal of the season: (United States) Jordan Angeli for Boston Breakers against Atlanta Beat, 18th minute (April 9)
- Earliest Goal in a match: 14 seconds by (United States) Lauren Cheney for Boston Breakers against Sky Blue FC (August 14)
- Widest Winning Margin: 6 goals
  - Philadelphia Independence 6–0 magicJack (June 18)
- Most Goals Scored in a Match: 7
  - Philadelphia Independence 4–3 Sky Blue FC (July 6)
- Fewest Scoreless Games: 1 – Western New York Flash
- Most Scoreless Games: 13 – Atlanta Beat
- Average Goals per Match: 2.778

==== Hat-tricks ====
Player	For	Against	Result	Date	Minutes
(United States) Abby Wambach	magicJack	Atlanta	4–0	May 28, 2011	9', 67', 89'
(United States) Natasha Kai	Philadelphia	Sky Blue	4–3	July 6, 2011	3', 38', 58'
(United States) Christen Press	magicJack	Boston	4–0	July 30, 2011	36', 76', 83'

- ^{4} Player scored 4 goals
- ^{5} Player scored 5 goals

=== Discipline ===
- First Yellow Card: (United States) Katherine Reynolds for Atlanta Beat against Boston Breakers (April 9)
- First Red Card: (United States) Allison Whitworth for Atlanta Beat against Boston Breakers (April 9)
- Most Yellow Cards: 4
  - (United States) Carli Lloyd (Atlanta Beat)

=== Streaks ===
- Longest Winning Streak: 6 games
  - Philadelphia Independence Games 8–13
- Longest Unbeaten Streak: 8 games
  - Western New York Flash Games 1–8
  - Western New York Flash Games 11–18
- Longest Winless Streak: 16 games
  - Atlanta Beat Games 3–18
- Longest Losing Streak: 5 games
  - Atlanta Beat Games 4–8
- Longest Shutouts:
  - Individual: 325 minutes by (United States) Valerie Henderson for Philadelphia Independence
  - Team:: 392 minutes for Philadelphia Independence
- Longest Drought: 757 minutes for Atlanta Beat

=== Home Team Record ===
(Regular season only)

- 30 wins, 14 losses, 10 ties – 1.852 PPG
- 92 goals for, 58 against – +34 GD
