= Lyndsey Patterson =

American soccer player

Personal information
- Full name: Lyndsey Raye Patterson
- Date of birth: December 7, 1982 (age 43)
- Place of birth: Puyallup, Washington, United States
- Height: 5 ft 2 in (1.57 m)
- Positions: Midfielder; forward

Team information
- Current team: Seattle Sounders Women

College career
| Years | Team | Apps | (Gls) |
| 2001–2004 | Tennessee Lady Volunteers | | |

Senior career*
| Years | Team | Apps | (Gls) |
| 2006–2007 | Seattle Sounders | 22 | (7) |
| 2008 | Atlanta Silverbacks | 12 | (4) |
| 2009 | Seattle Sounders | 6 | (2) |
| 2009 | Los Angeles Sol | 1 | (0) |
| 2009 | → Ajax America (loan) | 3 | (0) |
| 2010 | Philadelphia Independence | 14 | (1) |
| 2011 | Atlanta Beat | 7 | (0) |
| 2012 | Seattle Sounders Women | 5 | (1) |
| 2013 | Seattle Reign FC | 3 | (0) |
| 2014 | Seattle Sounders Women | | |
- * Club domestic league appearances and goals as of July 1, 2014

Lyndsey Raye Patterson (born December 7, 1982) is an American professional soccer midfielder and forward who plays for the Seattle Sounders Women of the W-League.

== Early life ==
Born and raised in Puyallup, Washington located just five miles east of Tacoma, Patterson attended Puyallup High School.

=== University of Tennessee ===
Lyndsey played for the University of Tennessee where she started 88 of 91 matches from 2001 to 2004 and was a three-time All-SEC selection. She ranked seventh all-time in scoring (64 points), eighth in goals (20), and sixth in assists (24).

== Playing career ==
=== Club ===
==== Atlanta Silverbacks ====
Patterson helped lead the Atlanta Silverbacks to first-place finishes in 2007 and 2008.

==== Los Angeles Sol ====
In 2009, Patterson signed a developmental contract with the Los Angeles Sol for the inaugural season of the WPS. She played twelve minutes during the 2009 WPS championship game against Sky Blue FC.

==== Philadelphia Independence ====
Patterson signed with the Philadelphia Independence for the 2010 WPS season. Upon the signing, Independence General Manager Terry Foley said of Patterson, "Lyndsey is a consistent player who can be very dangerous going forward. She made an impact against Sky Blue when she entered the match in the 2009 WPS finals, and we hope that she can be a big contributor for us this coming season." She made fourteen appearances for the Independence and scored one goal.

==== Atlanta Beat ====
In 2011, Patterson was traded to the Atlanta Beat. She made seven appearances with the team before leaving mid-season to return to play with the Seattle Sounders Women.

==== Seattle Sounders Women ====
Patterson returned to the Seattle Sounders Women in 2011. She played in three games, scored one goal and provided three assists the Sounders during the 2011 season.

During the 2012 season, she made 14 appearances for a total of 877 minutes. She netted five goals and provided three assists.

==== Seattle Reign FC ====
On February 28, 2013, Patterson signed with Seattle Reign FC for the inaugural season of the National Women's Soccer League. Of the signing, Reign FC general manager Amy Carnell said, "Lyndsey is the type of player that you'll see on any given day cracking the ball against the wall alone at Starfire Sports Complex. It's that passion, dedication and work ethic that makes her great addition to Reign FC."

On June 19, 2013, Seattle Reign FC released Tiffany Cameron and Lyndsey Patterson shortly after signing with Megan Rapinoe, Stephanie Cox and Kennya Cordner due NWSL rules. Patterson made three appearances for the Reign.

== Coaching career ==
Patterson was an assistant coach for her alma mater, the University of Tennessee. She is also a coach for Pacific Northwest Soccer Club in Seattle.

== See also ==
- Seattle Reign FC
