= Sue Weber =

American soccer player

Personal information
- Full name: Susan Lynn Weber
- Date of birth: April 1, 1986 (age 40)
- Place of birth: Islip, New York, United States
- Height: 5 ft 6 in (1.68 m)
- Position: Defender

Team information
- Current team: Boston Breakers
- Number: 20

College career
Years	Team	Apps	(Gls)
2004	Georgia Bulldogs		
2005–2007	Hofstra Pride		

Senior career*
Years	Team	Apps	(Gls)
2006–2008	Long Island Fury		
2008	Long Island Rough Riders	13	(0)
2009	Boston Breakers	9	(0)
2010–	Philadelphia Independence		

International career
- United States U-17
- * Club domestic league appearances and goals

Susan Lynn Weber (born April 1, 1986) is an American soccer defender who previously played for Philadelphia Independence of Women's Professional Soccer.

== Education ==
She attended Islip High School on Long Island. She got her bachelor's degree in physical education at Hofstra University in 2008.

== Sporting career ==
She was named the CAA Female Scholar-Athlete of the Year in 2007. She was also named First-Team Academic All-American. In 2008, she was the first soccer All-American at Hofstra and women's league Defender of the Year.

Weber's #20 was retired by the Hofstra University, where she played for three seasons (2005–07). Weber was also the first player in program history to earn All-America honors.
