= Estelle Johnson =

Cameroonian footballer (born 1988)

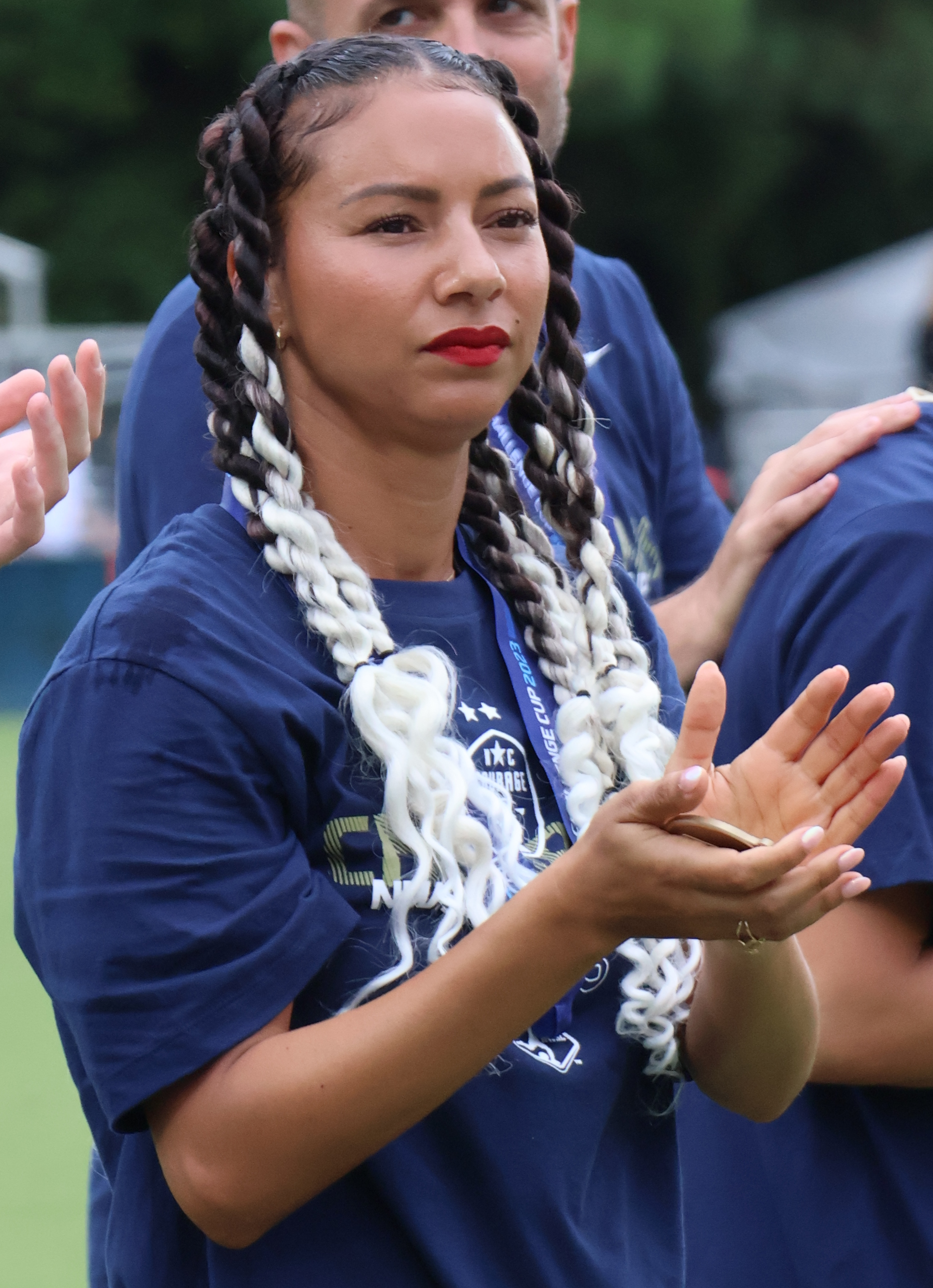
- Johnson with the North Carolina Courage in 2023

Personal information
- Full name: Estelle Laura Johnson
- Date of birth: 21 July 1988 (age 38)
- Place of birth: Maroua, Cameroon
- Height: 1.68 m (5 ft 6 in)
- Position: Defender

College career
| Years | Team | Apps | (Gls) |
| 2006–2009 | Kansas Jayhawks | 85 | (4) |

Senior career*
| Years | Team | Apps | (Gls) |
| 2010–2011 | Philadelphia Independence | 33 | (1) |
| 2011–2012 | Sydney FC | 11 | (1) |
| 2012 | New York Fury | | |
| 2013 | Western New York Flash | 22 | (0) |
| 2015–2018 | Washington Spirit | 71 | (2) |
| 2019–2022 | Gotham FC | 34 | (0) |
| 2023–2024 | North Carolina Courage | 0 | (0) |
| Total | | 171 | (4) |

International career^{‡}
| 2019–2023 | Cameroon | 5 | (1) |
- * Club domestic league appearances and goals as of 28 June 2024 ‡ National team caps and goals as of 21:25, 17 July 2022 (UTC)

Estelle Laura Johnson (born 21 July 1988) is a Cameroonian former professional footballer who played as a defender. She previously played for Western New York Flash, Washington Spirit, and Gotham FC in the NWSL, Philadelphia Independence in Women's Professional Soccer (WPS), and Sydney FC of Australia's W-League.

== Early life ==
Johnson was born in Cameroon to an American father and Malian mother. She moved to multiple countries for her father's job but her family eventually settled in Colorado when she was in elementary school. She grew up in Fort Collins where she was a four-year letterwinner at Rocky Mountain High School. As a freshman, Johnson was named the best defensive player by the team. She earned all-conference first team honors as a freshman, sophomore and junior and was named all-state during her junior and senior years. She was named team MVP as a sophomore and a junior.

Johnson was a member of the Olympic Development Program (ODP) Region IV pool. She also captained the club team, Fort Collins Arsenal.

== College career ==
Johnson attended the University of Kansas where she played for the Jayhawks from 2006 to 2009. During her freshman season, she appeared in all 19 matches with 18 starts. She ranked fifth on the team with 1445 minutes played and helped the Jayhawks shut out eight opponents and hold 0.98 goals against average. She was named to the Big 12 All-Newcomer Team and was selected to the Cal Invitational All-Tournament Team. As a sophomore, she started all 21 matches for a total of 1,883 minutes – third most on the team. She was named Third Team All-Central Region by Soccer Buzz. During her junior season, Johnson started all 23 matches, playing a program-record 2,110 minutes. She was named All-Central Region by Soccer Buzz and the National Soccer Coaches Association of America (NSCAA) as well as to the Big 12 Championship All-Tournament Team and academic all-conference team.

== Club career ==
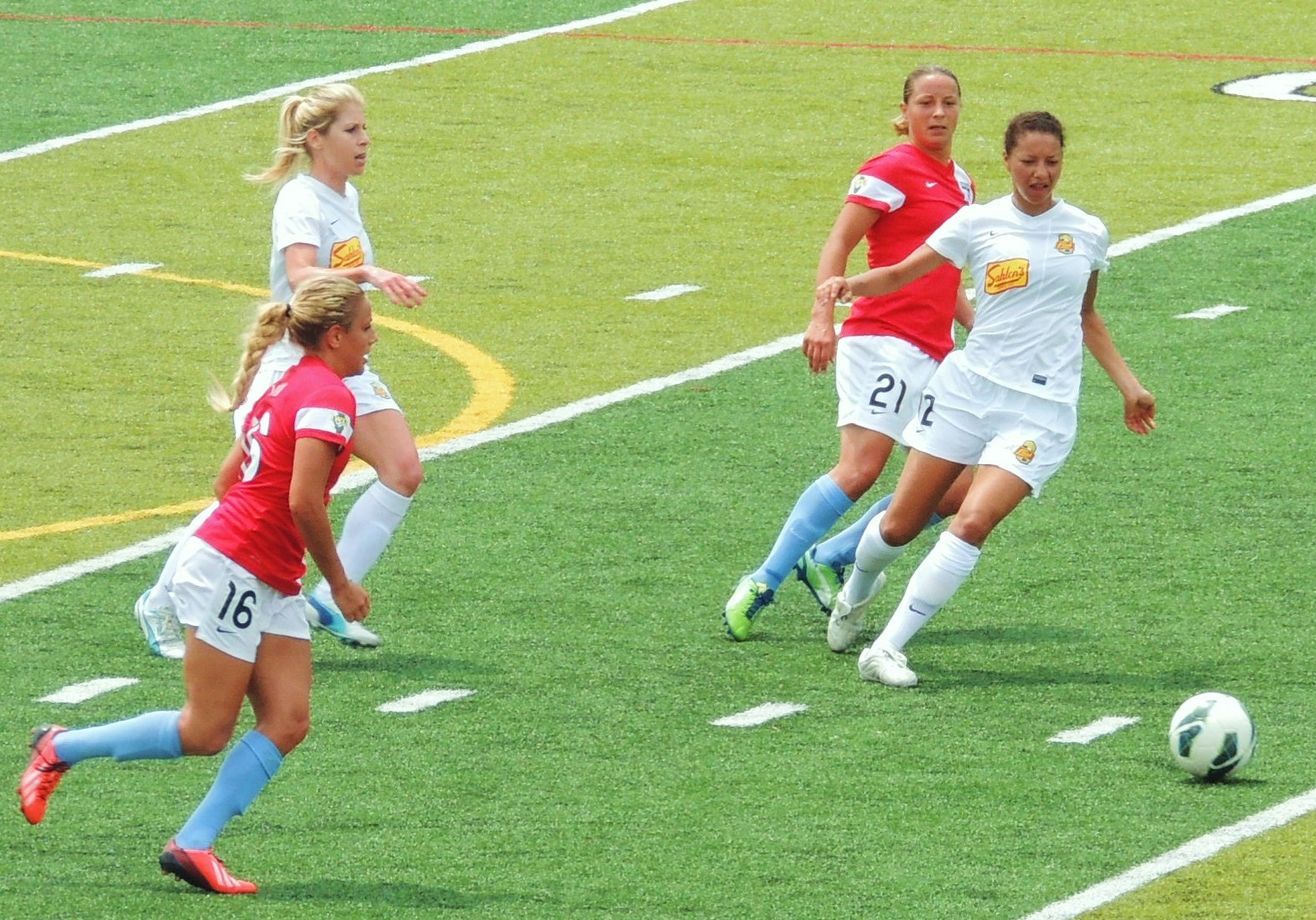
July 4, 2013; Chicago Red Stars vs Western New York Flash. Playing at midfield, left to right: Leon-16, Zerboni-7, Grings-21, Estelle Johnson-12

=== Philadelphia Independence ===
Johnson was selected by the Los Angeles Sol during the 2010 WPS Draft; however, the team folded before the 2011 season and Johnson signed with the Philadelphia Independence as part of the 2010 WPS Dispersal Draft. She made 16 appearances for the club, including 13 starts. Johnson joined the Independence for the 2011 season. She made 15 starts in 17 appearances for a total of 1,403 minutes and scored one goal.

=== Western New York Flash, 2013–2014 ===
In 2013, Johnson was drafted to the Western New York Flash in the National Women's Soccer League. She was selected during the first round (seventh overall) of the 2013 NWSL Supplemental Draft.

=== Washington Spirit, 2015–2018 ===
Johnson was traded to the Spirit on February 24, 2015, in exchange for defender Toni Pressley. In her first season with the Spirit, she played in all but one game (due to personal commitment), logging 1685 minutes. In 2016, Johnson played in eleven matches, totaling 990 minutes. She has started in 30 of her combined 31 appearances over the two seasons.

=== Sky Blue FC, 2019–2022 ===
In January 2019, Johnson was traded to Sky Blue FC along with teammates DiDi Haracic and Caprice Dydasco for the third overall and 29th picks of the 2019 NWSL College Draft.

On July 12, 2021, Johnson reached 10,000 minutes played in the NWSL.

=== NC Courage, 2023–2024 ===
On December 1, 2022, Johnson signed a two-year free agent deal with the North Carolina Courage, becoming one of the first few players to sign a contract under the NWSL's new free agency rules.

== International career ==
Johnson became interested in playing for Cameroon, her country of birth, after watching the team reach the Round of 16 in the 2015 FIFA Women's World Cup. She struggled to work out the details with the team, until coach Alain Djeumfa joined the team in January 2019 and her place on the team was finalized.

Johnson was named to the Indomitable Lionesses' squad on 1 May 2019 and made her debut 16 days later against Spain in a 0–4 friendly loss. The same month, she was named to the final roster for Cameroon for the 2019 FIFA Women's World Cup in France.

At the 2019 World Cup, Johnson played every minute in the Lionesses' four matches, spanning three group stage games as well as the team's 0–3 loss to England in the Round of 16.

== Honours ==
Western New York Flash

- NWSL Shield: 2013

Individual

- IFFHS CAF Women's Team of the Decade: 2011–2020
- NWSL Team of the Month: April 2017, June 2017, April 2018, September 2021
