= Allison Falk =

Former American professional soccer defender

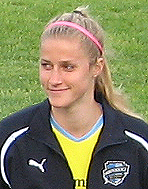

Personal information
- Full name: Allison Jane Falk
- Date of birth: March 31, 1987 (age 39)
- Place of birth: Renton, Washington, United States
- Height: 6 ft 0 in (1.83 m)
- Position: Defender

College career
Years	Team	Apps	(Gls)
2005–2008	Stanford Cardinal		

Senior career*
Years	Team	Apps	(Gls)
2008	California Storm		
2009	Los Angeles Sol	16	(1)
2010	Philadelphia Independence	25	(2)
- * Club domestic league appearances and goals

Allison Jane Falk (born March 31, 1987) is a former American professional soccer defender. She previously played for the Los Angeles Sol and Philadelphia Independence of Women's Professional Soccer (WPS). She was a WPS All-Star in 2010.

== Early life ==
Born in the Seattle suburb of Renton, Washington, to Brad and Jenise Falk, Allison was raised in Danville, California, and attended San Ramon Valley High School, where she captained the squad to back-to-back league championships in 2003 and 2004 as well as the North Coast Section (NCS) finals in 2004. A four-year letter winner in soccer, Falk was named the NSCAA/adidas All-American Team and California High School Sports North Coast Section (NCS) Player of the Year in 2004. She was also a four-time East Bay Athletic League First Team selection. Falk played club for the Pleasanton Rage.

=== Stanford Cardinal ===
Falk attended Stanford University, where she played for the Cardinal from 2005 to 2008. In 2005, Falk was named to the Pac-10 All-Freshman team. During her sophomore season, she led the team to 15 shutouts, a 0.55 goals against average (GAA) and was named to the All-Pac-10 Second Team. As a junior, she earned All-Pac 10 Honorable Mention after leading a defense that had the nation's third best regular-season GAA. During her senior year, she helped Stanford post a .317 GAA and earned All-Pac 10 Second Team honors. The Cardinal finished second to UCLA in the conference with a 22-2-1 record and their made their first Women's College Cup appearance since 1993.

== Playing career ==
=== Los Angeles Sol ===
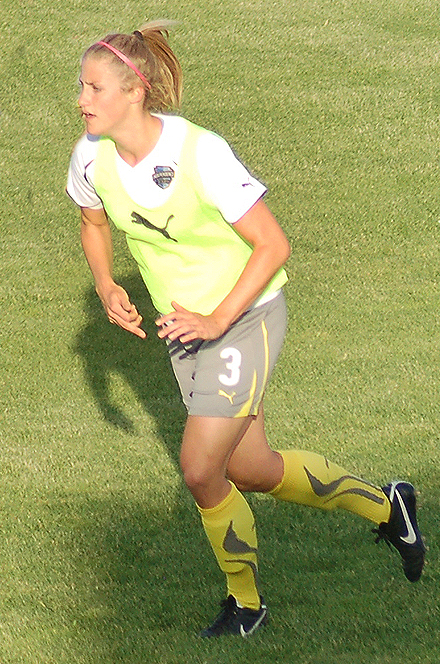
Falk in training, 2010.

Falk was selected tenth during the 2009 WPS Draft by the Los Angeles Sol for the inaugural season of the Women's Professional Soccer (WPS). She is best known for scoring the first goal in the history of the league on an assist from Aya Miyama in the seventh minute of the league's first game against the Washington Freedom.

=== Philadelphia Independence ===
Falk was traded to the Philadelphia Independence for the 2010 WPS season. She scored the team's inaugural goal during the 55th minute of the team's second game on an assist from teammate, Lori Lindsey. During her second season in the WPS, she was selected as a WPS All-Star and was a finalist for Defender of the Year.
