= Gina DiMartino =

American soccer player

Personal information
- Full name: Gina DiMartino
- Date of birth: July 31, 1988 (age 38)
- Place of birth: Long Island, New York, United States
- Height: 5 ft 3 in (1.60 m)
- Positions: Forward; midfielder

Team information
- Current team: Philadelphia Independence
- Number: 20

Youth career
- 2003–2006: Massapequa High School

College career
Years	Team	Apps	(Gls)
2006–2009	Boston College Eagles		

Senior career*
Years	Team	Apps	(Gls)
2007	Long Island Fury		
2009	Long Island Rough Riders		
2010–2011	Philadelphia Independence		
2013	Apollon Limassol		

International career
2004	United States U-17		
2007–2008	United States U-20		
2009	United States U-23		
Medal record
Representing United States
Women's Football
Pan American Games
Silver medal – second place	2007 Rio de Janeiro	Team competition
- * Club domestic league appearances and goals

Gina DiMartino (born July 31, 1988) is an American soccer player from Massapequa, New York. She previously played for the Philadelphia Independence of Women's Professional Soccer and the United States U-23 women's national soccer team.

Her older sister Christina DiMartino was a midfielder for the United States women's national soccer team and her former teammate on the Philadelphia Independence. Another sister, Vicki DiMartino, is a defender for the United States U-20 women's national soccer team and currently plays for Western New York Flash.
