= Joanna Lohman =

American soccer player (born 1982)

- Lohman with Washington Spirit in 2018

Personal information
- Full name: Joanna Christie Lohman
- Date of birth: June 26, 1982 (age 44)
- Place of birth: Silver Spring, Maryland, United States
- Height: 5 ft 5 in (1.65 m)
- Position: Midfielder

Youth career
- 1992–2000: Bethesda Scorpions

College career
Years	Team	Apps	(Gls)
2000–2003	Penn State Nittany Lions	101	(41)

Senior career*
Years	Team	Apps	(Gls)
2001–2002	Maryland Pride		
2006	Washington Freedom	0	(0)
2008	Bälinge IF		
2009	Saint Louis Athletica	0	(0)
2009	Washington Freedom	7	(0)
2010–2011	Philadelphia Independence	33	(5)
2011–2012	Espanyol	21	(3)
2012	D.C. United Women	5	(0)
2013–2014	Boston Breakers	39	(3)
2013	→ Apollon Limassol (loan)		
2015–2018	Washington Spirit	52	(6)

International career
2000–2005	United States U-21		
2001–2007	United States	9	(0)
- * Club domestic league appearances and goals

Joanna Christie Lohman (born June 26, 1982) is a retired American professional soccer midfielder/defender who last played for the Washington Spirit of the American National Women's Soccer League. She previously played for the Washington Freedom and Philadelphia Independence. In addition, she served as the general manager of the Washington Freedom Futures, the Washington Freedom Soccer Club's W-League team. Lohman is a former member of the United States women's national soccer team and author of the book Raising Tomorrow's Champions: What the Women's National Soccer Team Teaches Us About Grit, Authenticity and Winning, which was released on March 3, 2021 by Inspire Digital Media.

== Early life ==
Lohman grew up in Silver Spring, Maryland and attended Springbrook High School. In 1999, she was named an All-Met selection, and won the Maryland Gatorade high school girls soccer player of the year.

=== Penn State ===
Lohman was captain of the Penn State Nittany Lions from 2002 to 2003 and was the first four-time First Team All-Big Ten selection in the school's history. She earned a 3.98 GPA while obtaining her business degree at Penn State, resulting in her also being a four-time Academic All-American. In 2002, Lohman was a MAC Hermann Trophy finalist and earned first-team NCAA All-American honors for the second-straight year. In 2004, she was named Pennsylvania's NCAA Woman of the Year. In 2005, she was awarded the Big Ten Medal of Honor, which recognizes one male and one female student from the graduating class of each Big Ten member school, for demonstrating joint athletic and academic excellence throughout their college career.

== Club career ==
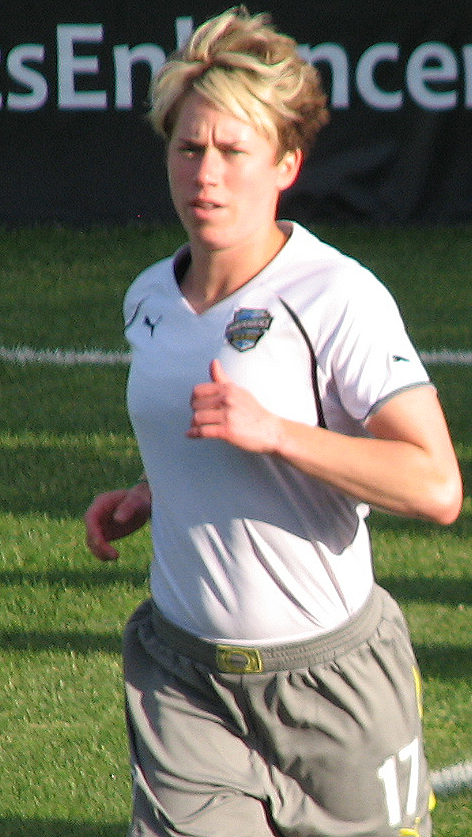
Joanna Lohman playing for the Philadelphia Independence, 2010.

Lohman was selected by the Saint Louis Athletica during the 2008 WPS General Draft. Lohman did not want to leave the DC area, however, so Athletica traded Lohman's rights to the Washington Freedom in January 2009. She appeared in seven games with the Freedom during the 2009 season.

In September 2009, Lohman traveled to Japan with Freedom teammate Rebecca Moros to train with NTV Beleza, a professional team based outside of Tokyo.

As a free agent, Lohman signed to the Philadelphia Independence for the 2010 season. She ended the season with 24 appearances and 5 goals. Lohman was tied as the second-leading goal scorer and started 20 of 24 games.

Lohman returned to the Independence during the 2011 season, making 10 appearances.

During the 2011–2012 off-season, Lohman and her teammate, Lianne Sanderson, joined RCD Espanyol de Barcelona in Spain.

After the folding of the WPS in early 2012, Lohman and Sanderson joined D.C. United Women in the W-League for the 2012 season. Lohman played in five games, for a total of 391 minutes.

In February 2012, she and Sanderson joined Boston Breakers in the new National Women's Soccer League. The duo went on loan to Cypriot club Apollon Limassol after the American season had finished, to play in the UEFA Women's Champions League.

In September 2014, Lohman was waived by Breakers and was selected by Washington Spirit for the 2015 season. In her first year with the Spirit, the midfielder played in 17 out of the Spirit's 20 regular season matches. In 2016, Lohman played in all 20 regular season matches plus the semifinal. She scored four goals, tied for second most on the team, and notched one assist. Lohman memorably scored the opening goal of the historic 4th NWSL season in dramatic fashion with a bicycle kick in the 3rd minute against Boston Breakers on April 16, 2016.

During the 2017 season opener against North Carolina Courage, Lohman suffered an ACL injury keeping her from playing the remainder of the season.

In March 2018, Lohman returned to the pitch following her ACL repair as a halftime substitute in the Spirit's 2018 season opener against Seattle Reign. Lohman scored the Spirit's lone goal in a 2–1 defeat.

On April 8, 2019 Lohman announced her retirement from professional soccer. The Spirit retired her number 15 during a ceremony during the club's first LGBT pride-themed night on June 22.

== International career ==
From 2000 to 2005, Lohman was a member of the U-21 US national team and served as captain of the squad through 2003–2004. In 2002, she helped lead the team to three Nordic Cup championships, earning MVP honors.

Lohman trained with United States women's national soccer team during the 2004 Olympic Residency Training Camp and has nine caps with the senior team. She made her debut with the senior team in 2000–2001 during the Algarve Cup in a 1–0 defeat to Italy. In 2006, she helped the team defeat Australia 2–0 during the Peace Queen Cup.

== Honors and awards ==
- First Team NSCAA Academic All-American (2001–2003)
- Two-time Herman Trophy and Honda Sports Award Finalist (2002–2003)
- First Team All-Big Ten (2000–2003)
- Big Ten Player of the Year (2003)
- Three-time NSCAA All- American selection and CoSIDA Academic All-American (2001–2003)
- 2000 Big Ten Freshman of the Year

== Personal life ==
From 2010 to 2015, while playing for the Philadelphia Independence, Lohman was in a relationship with Philadelphia teammate and English international Lianne Sanderson. The couple moved to Spain together and founded JoLi Academy, a training centre for young female footballers in India.

Lohman helped launch an organization called GO! Athletes that aims to encourage schools to create safer spaces for lesbian, gay, transgender, bisexual and questioning athletes.

In February 2015 Lohman was confirmed to be in a relationship with Lucy Keener from Baltimore, which lasted until August 2016.

During the 2016 NWSL offseason, Lohman traveled to Botswana to run a U.S. State Department program called "Girl Power", using the shared experience of sport to promote gender equality.

Lohman married Melodie George in Washington, D.C., in September 2021. George works for the United States Chamber of Commerce. In August 2022, Lohman announced on Instagram that the couple was expecting their first child in December.

Lohman is vice president of Tenant Consulting, LLC, a commercial real estate firm in the Washington metropolitan area. She helped create the first "carbon neutral calculator" for office buildings, resulting in an invitation to meet former Vice President Al Gore.
