= Danesha Adams =

American soccer player and coach (born 1986)

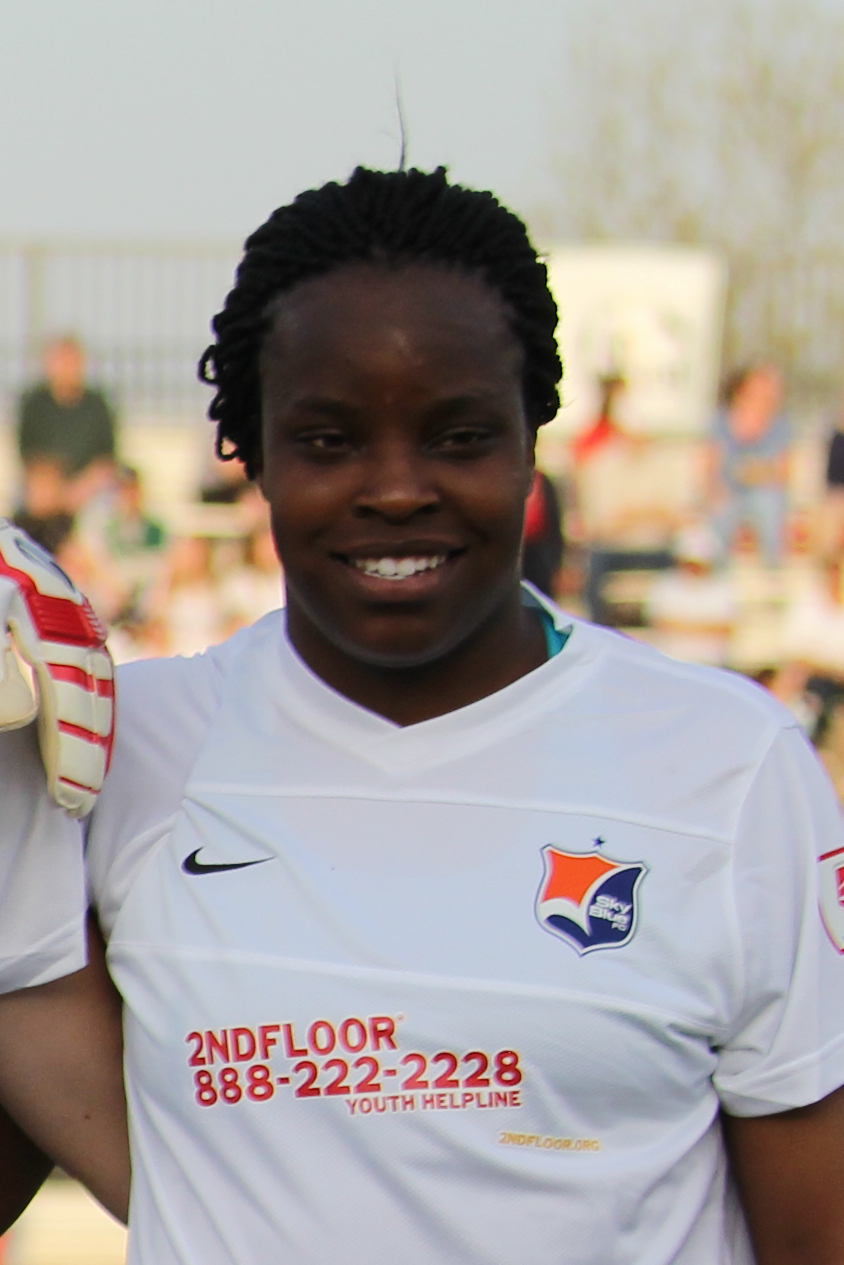

Personal information
- Full name: Danesha LaVonne Adams
- Date of birth: June 6, 1986 (age 40)
- Place of birth: Bellflower, California, United States
- Height: 5 ft 6 in (1.68 m)
- Positions: Forward; midfielder

College career
| Years | Team | Apps | (Gls) |
| 2004–2007 | UCLA Bruins | | |

Senior career*
| Years | Team | Apps | (Gls) |
| 2007 | Cleveland Internationals Women | 5 | (10) |
| 2008 | Pali Blues | 11 | (6) |
| 2009 | Chicago Red Stars | 12 | (0) |
| 2010–2011 | Philadelphia Independence | 27 | (4) |
| 2011 | Medkila | 7 | (4) |
| 2012 | Vittsjö | 21 | (10) |
| 2013 | Sky Blue FC | 20 | (3) |
| 2013 | Ataşehir Belediyespor | 7 | (8) |
| 2014 | Washington Spirit | 13 | (1) |
| 2015 | Medkila IL | 16 | (4) |

International career
- United States U-20
- United States U-21
| 2006 | United States | 1 | (0) |

Managerial career
- 2017–2020: Houston Cougars (assistant)
- 2020–2024: Pacific Tigers (co-head coach)
- 2025–: Texas Southern Tigers
- * Club domestic league appearances and goals

Danesha LaVonne Adams (born June 6, 1986) is an American retired soccer forward and midfielder. She is the head coach of the Texas Southern Tigers. She played for Portland Thorns FC in the National Women's Soccer League (NWSL). She previously played for Sky Blue FC and Washington Spirit of the NWSL, Chicago Red Stars and Philadelphia Independence in the WPS, Medkila IL in Norway's Toppserien, Vittsjö GIK in the Swedish Damallsvenskan, and Ataşehir Belediyespor in Turkey's Women's First Football League as well as for the Cleveland Internationals and Pali Blues in the W-League.

== Early life ==
Born in Bellflower, California to LaVonne and Lawrence Adams, Danesha attended Walnut High School in Walnut, California for one year, earning Rookie of the Year honors and playing on the Region-IV Olympic Development Program (ODP) Team. After moving to Ohio with her family, Adams finished her high school career at Shaker Heights High School in Shaker Heights, Ohio where she would set the school's single-season record for goals and assists

Adams played club soccer for the FC Slammers and helped the team to two state championships. She was named MVP of the Under-19 Super Group at the 2003 Surf Cup after leading her team to the title and helped her team capture the Frosted Flakes Kellogg's Cup in 2000, earning a picture on a Kellogg's cereal box. Adams was a Third-Team All-Ohio selection.

== Collegiate career ==
Adams attended UCLA where she played four years for the Bruins. As a freshman, she played in all 25 games, starting 23. She ended the season ranked second on the team and fourth in the Pac-10 Conference in scoring with 28 points (12 goals and 4 assists). She also ranked first on the team with five game-winning goals. Adams scored four goals during the NCAA Tournament, including game winners over Duke in the third round and Princeton during the semi-final. She was named a Soccer America and Soccer Buzz Freshman All-American. Other season honors included: Pac-10 Player of the Week, 2004 NCAA All-Tournament Team, and Soccer America's Team of the Week.

As a sophomore, she started all 26 matches and led the Pac-10 in scoring with 46 points on 21 goals and four assists, setting a new single-season school record with nine game-winning goals. Adams was named to the NSCAA/adidas second-team All-American and was a member of Soccer America's Collegiate MVP Team. She was also named First-team Soccer Buzz All-American, First-team All-Pac-10, and was a member of the all-tournament team at the NCAA College Cup. During the NCAA Tournament, she scored a record four goals in the Bruins' 5–0 victory over Virginia during the NCAA Quarterfinals and tallied a total of six goals during UCLA's run to the NCAA Final. During her junior year, Adams played and started 19 matches. She missed the first four matches of the year while competing at the FIFA Under-20 World Championships in Russia and later missed two more matches while competing with the full U.S. Women's National Team. Adams earned third-team NSCAA/adidas All-America honors, was a Soccer Buzz second-team All-American and First-team All-Pac-10 selection. She ranked second on the team in scoring with 28 points on twelve goals and four assists. She also ranked second in game-winning goals with seven. Adams was named Soccer America's National Player of the Week after scoring three goals in victories over number three-ranked Texas A&M and number eleven UConn.

== Club career ==
=== Women's Professional Soccer, 2009–2011 ===
Adams signed with the Chicago Red Stars for the 2009 WPS season. She made 12 appearances for the club, making two starts.

Adams signed with the Philadelphia Independence for the 2010 season. Her goal in the 103rd minute of the WPS Super Semi-final gave the Independence a 2–1 overtime win over the Boston Breakers leading the team to the 2010 WPS Championship.

=== National Women's Soccer League, 2013–2014 ===
In 2013, Adams signed with Sky Blue FC for the inaugural season of the National Women's Soccer League (NWSL).

On January 10, 2014, the Houston Dash selected Adams with the ninth pick in the 2014 NWSL Expansion Draft. Just a few days later, on January 13, 2014, the Houston Dash traded Adams to the Washington Spirit for Stephanie Ochs. On September 12 Washington Spirit waived Adams.

On September 15, 2014, Adams was selected by Portland Thorns FC, from among players waived by NWSL clubs, for the 2015 season.

=== Ataşehir Belediyespor, 2013 ===
On November 1, 2013, Adams signed for the Turkish team Ataşehir Belediyespor in Istanbul. She capped in all the seven matches of the Women's First League's first half season, and scored eight goals.

== International career ==
As a junior international, Adams took part in the 2006 U-20 World Championship, where she was the United States's top scorer with three goals and was included in the competition's all-star team. She made her first and only appearance for the United States women's national soccer team one month later in a friendly match against Chinese Taipei, providing an assist for Megan Rapinoe at the 82nd minute.

== Coaching career ==
She coached for the University of Houston from 2017 until 2020, when she accepted an assistant coach position with the Pacific Tigers. In the preseason of 2021, she and J.J. Wozniak were selected as interim co-head coaches and at the end of the season, were promoted to permanent co-head coaches.

After leaving Pacific in 2024, she was hired as the head coach at Texas Southern in 2025.

== Career statistics ==
=== Club ===
Appearances and goals by club, season and competition
| Club | Season | League | | | Cup (Note: Includes Norwegian Women's Cup and Svenska Cupen) | | Playoffs (Note: Includes WPS playoffs, NWSL playoffs, and Toppserien Relegation play-offs) | | Total | |
| Club | Season | Division | Apps | Goals | Apps | Goals | Apps | Goals | Apps | Goals |
|---|---|---|---|---|---|---|---|---|---|---|
| Chicago Red Stars | 2009 | WPS | 12 | 0 | — | | — | | 12 | 0 |
| Philadelphia Independence | 2010 | WPS | 14 | 1 | — | | 3 | 1 | 17 | 2 |
| Philadelphia Independence | 2011 | WPS | 13 | 3 | — | | 2 | 0 | 15 | 3 |
| Medkila IL | 2011 | Toppserien | 7 | 4 | — | | — | | 7 | 4 |
| Vittsjö GIK | 2012 | Damallsvenskan | 21 | 10 | 1 | 0 | — | | 22 | 10 |
| Sky Blue FC | 2013 | NWSL | 20 | 3 | — | | 1 | 0 | 21 | 3 |
| Ataşehir Belediyespor | 2013–14 | Turkish League | 7 | 8 | — | | — | | 7 | 8 |
| Washington Spirit | 2014 | NWSL | 13 | 1 | — | | 0 | 0 | 13 | 1 |
| Medkila IL | 2015 | Toppserien | 16 | 4 | 2 | 1 | 2 | 2 | 20 | 7 |
| Career total | | | 123 | 34 | 3 | 1 | 8 | 3 | 134 | 38 |

=== International ===
Appearances and goals by national team and year
| National team | Year | Apps | Goals |
|---|---|---|---|
| United States | 2006 | 1 | 0 |
| Total | | 1 | 0 |
