= Natasha Kai =

American soccer player

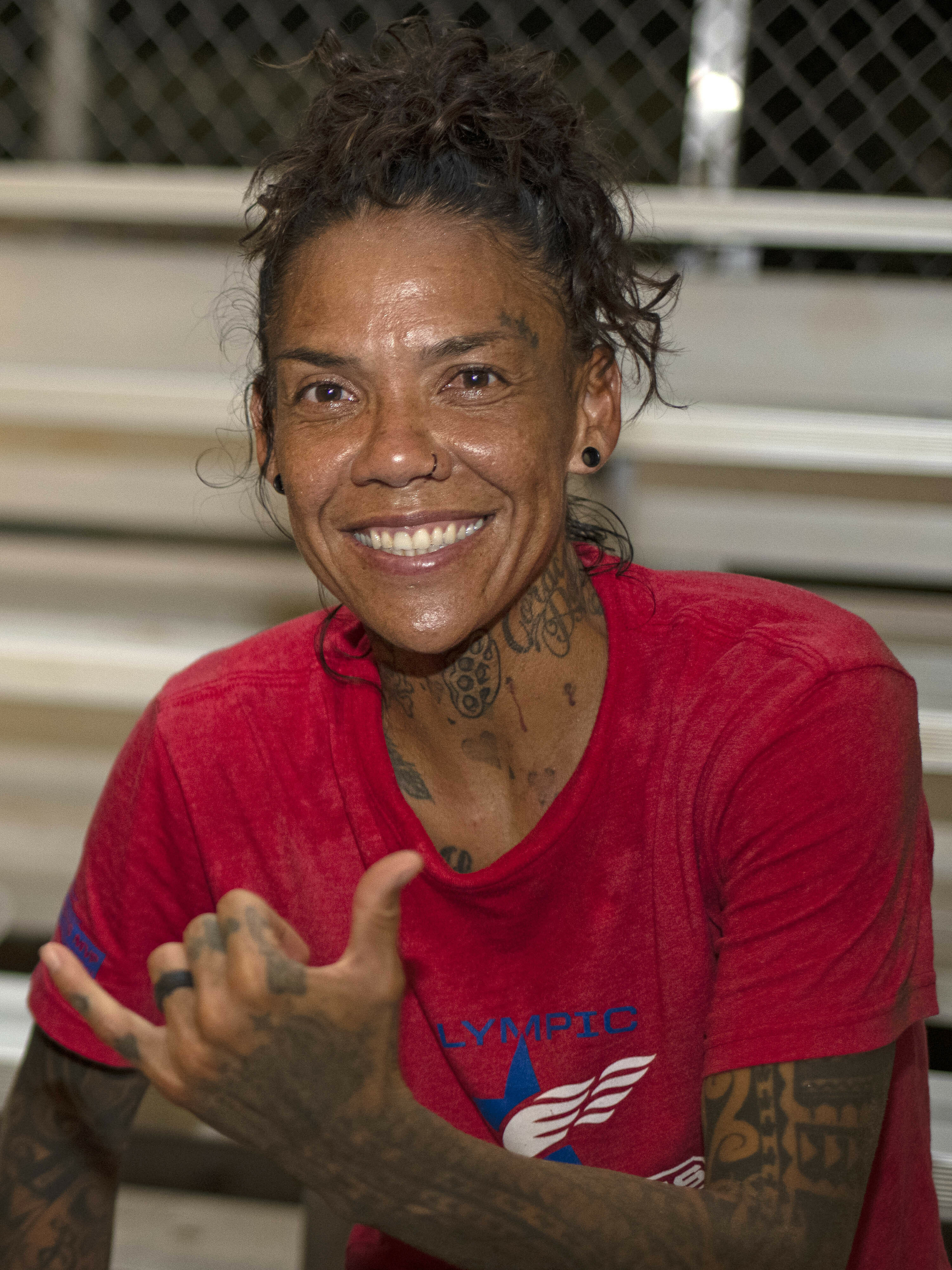
- Kai in 2021

Personal information
- Full name: Natasha Kanani Janine Kai
- Date of birth: May 22, 1983 (age 43)
- Place of birth: Kahuku, Hawaii, United States
- Height: 5 ft 8 in (1.73 m)
- Position: Forward

College career
Years	Team	Apps	(Gls)
2002–2005	Hawaii Rainbow Wahine		

Senior career*
Years	Team	Apps	(Gls)
2009–2010	Sky Blue FC	37	(11)
2011	Philadelphia Independence	17	(9)
2016–2017	Sky Blue FC	21	(4)
2019	LA Galaxy OC		

International career^{‡}
2004–2006	United States U-21		
2006–2009	United States	67	(24)
Medal record
Women's football
Representing the United States
Olympic Games
Gold medal – first place	2008 Beijing	Team competition
FIFA Women's World Cup
Bronze medal – third place	2007 China	Team
- * Club domestic league appearances and goals as of August 19, 2011 ‡ National team caps and goals as of October 21, 2009

Natasha Kanani Janine Kai (born May 22, 1983) is an American professional soccer forward and Olympic gold medalist who played professionally most recently in 2019. She previously played for Sky Blue FC and the Philadelphia Independence of Women's Professional Soccer and National Women's Soccer League as well as the United States women's national soccer team. In 2011, Kai was also part of the first US women's rugby union sevens team to play in the IRB Women's Sevens Challenge Cup held in Dubai.

== Early life ==
Kai is of Chinese, Filipino, and Native Hawaiian descent.

=== University of Hawaiʻi ===
Kai played for the University of Hawaiʻi Rainbow Wahine from 2002 to 2005. She was named WAC player of the Year in 2002, 2003, and 2005, and was named a third-team All American in 2003.

During Kai's standout career, she set multiple WAC records. She was named WAC Freshman of the Year in 2002, becoming the first soccer player to be named Freshman and Player of the Year in the same season. She also became the first player in WAC history to earn three Player of the Year awards and First-Team all-conference honors all four seasons. Kai owns the WAC career shots record (446) and is second in goals (72) and points (162). She finished her college career with 72 goals in 73 matches.

== Club career ==
=== Sky Blue FC ===
On September 16, 2008 the initial WPS player allocation was conducted; Kai was allocated to Sky Blue FC with fellow US Women's National Team players Heather O'Reilly and Christie Rampone. Kai's electrifying play on offense was key in Sky Blue FC's 2009 WPS championship season.

=== Philadelphia Independence ===
On December 21, 2010, Kai signed a deal to play with the Philadelphia Independence. On July 6 she scored a hat trick against her former team, Sky Blue FC.

=== Washington Spirit ===
In February 2013, Kai was selected during round four (25th overall) of the 2013 NWSL Supplemental Draft for the inaugural season of National Women's Soccer League. According to a press release of the Spirit, she was recovering from a knee injury, and was expected to begin play around the start of the 2013 NWSL season. Kai never played for the Washington Spirit.

=== Sky Blue FC ===
On February 11, 2016 Sky Blue FC announced the signing of Kai for 2016 season. She played through the full season scoring 4 goals before getting surgery on her left ankle for a reoccurring injury on September 26, 2016.

=== Los Angeles Galaxy OC ===
Kai joined LA Galaxy Orange County, a team in the United Women's Soccer league, in 2019. Her first appearance was on June 30, 2019. She scored a goal for the team in its 2019 UWS playoffs match against the Houston Aces on July 13, 2019.

== International career ==
=== Youth team ===
Kai was first brought in with the U.S. U-21 Women's National Team in 2004, and was the leading scorer in the team with 12 goals, including six in international matches. She helped lead the U-21s to the Nordic Cup title in Iceland, scoring three goals in the tournament including two against Germany. She injured her shoulder in her final college game of 2004, then re-injured it again in her first U-21 camp of 2005, necessitating surgery, and did not get called into an U-21 camp until January 2006.

=== Senior team ===
Kai started her first training camp with the senior United States Women's National Team in February 2006. She made her WNT debut as a substitute at the 2006 Algarve Cup in Portugal, scoring in her first two games against Denmark and France. She became just the fourth player in U.S. WNT history to score in her first two caps.

Kai scored four goals in her first seven WNT matches, including the winner in a 1–0 victory over Japan on May 9, 2006. She went on to become the first-ever player from Hawaii, and first with native Hawaiian heritage, to play for the full Women's National Team and to make a Women's World Cup Team. She played in 17 games during her first year on the National Team, starting in four matches. She scored six goals, two of them in the 2006 Algarve Cup. She also scored against Japan, Ireland, Canada and Australia. Her goal against the Matildas came in a 2–0 win at the Peace Cup in South Korea.

In 2007, Kai played in seven games heading into the final pre-Women's World Cup match, starting in four. She had two assists and one goal that came in a 2–0 win over China at the Four Nations Tournament to give USA the tournament title. She was one of the final three players chosen to the 2007 U.S. Women's World Cup Team.

At the 2008 Summer Olympics in Beijing, Kai scored the winning goal in overtime to lead the U.S. past Canada in the quarterfinal round.

Kai last played for the U.S. on March 11, 2009 against Sweden. She has not been selected for national team duty since having major shoulder surgery in the fall of 2009.

In September 2011 via Twitter, Kai said she would never play for the Women's National Team again, stating, "I will never play for the USWNT ever again so Id appreciate it if u stop asking & tweeting me about it. Its in the past & staying there thx"

== Career statistics ==
=== International ===
Scores and results list United States's goal tally first, score column indicates score after each Kai goal.

List of international goals scored by Natasha Kai
No.	Date	Venue	Opponent	Score	Result	Competition	Ref.
1	March 11, 2006	Quarteira	Denmark	5–0	5–0	2006 Algarve Cup	
2	March 13, 2006	Faro, Portugal	France	4–1	4–1	2006 Algarve Cup	
3	May 9, 2006	Osaka	Japan	1–0	1–0	Friendly	
4	July 23, 2006	San Diego	Ireland	4–0	5–0	Friendly	
5	July 30, 2006	Cary, North Carolina	Canada	2–0	2–0	Friendly	
6	October 31, 2006	Cheonan	Australia	2–0	2–0	2006 Peace Queen Cup	
7	January 30, 2007	Guangzhou	China	2–0	2–0	Four Nations Tournament	
8	October 17, 2007	Portland, Oregon	Mexico	3–0	4–0	Friendly	
9	March 10, 2008	Alvor	Norway	1–0	4–0	2008 Algarve Cup	
10	March 12, 2008	Santo António	Denmark	2–1	2–1	2008 Algarve Cup	
11	April 6, 2008	Ciudad Juárez	Mexico	1–0	3–1	2008 Olympic Qualifying	
12	April 6, 2008	Ciudad Juárez	Mexico	3–1	3–1	2008 Olympic Qualifying	
13	April 9, 2008	Ciudad Juárez	Costa Rica	1–0	3–0	2008 Olympic Qualifying	
14	April 9, 2008	Ciudad Juárez	Costa Rica	3–0	3–0	2008 Olympic Qualifying	
15	April 27, 2008	Cary, North Carolina	Australia	1–0	3–2	Friendly	
16	May 10, 2008	Washington, D.C.	Canada	2–0	6–0	Friendly	
17	May 10, 2008	Washington, D.C.	Canada	3–0	6–0	Friendly	
18	May 10, 2008	Washington, D.C.	Canada	5–0	6–0	Friendly	
19	June 15, 2008	Suwon	Australia	1–0	2–1	2008 Peace Queen Cup	
20	July 16, 2008	San Diego	Brazil	1–0	1–0	Friendly	
21	August 15, 2008	Shanghai	Canada	2–1	2–1 (a.e.t.)	2008 Summer Olympics	
22	September 13, 2008	Philadelphia	Ireland	1–0	2–0	Friendly	
23	September 17, 2008	East Rutherford, New Jersey	Ireland	1–0	1–0	Friendly	
24	March 6, 2009	Ferreiras	Iceland	1–0	1–0	2009 Algarve Cup	

== Rugby ==
Kai was part of the US women's rugby union sevens team to the first IRB Women's Sevens Challenge Cup held in Dubai 2011.

== Personal life ==
At five years old, Kai accidentally stepped on a glass bottle and the tendons in her foot were severely damaged. Doctors were afraid she might never be able to run again, but she fully recovered from the injury.

She is also known for her distinctive tattoos. She has over 60 tattoos, two being "sleeve tattoos" on her left and right arms. She has tattoos on both legs, arms, feet, and hands, and on her back, chest, sides, and the front, side, and back of her neck. Along with the tattoos, she also has two lower lip piercings.

She was featured on an episode of the hit show LA Ink and had a large spread in ESPN The Magazine's "The Body Issue".

Kai has openly discussed the fact that she is lesbian, and was one of only three openly gay individuals on the 2008 USA Summer Olympic Team. During an interview with NBCOlympics.com, Kai was quoted as saying the following:

It was a hard time... I had missed the first camp under new head coach Pia Sundhage in early-January because I had bronchitis, and I was going through a nasty break-up with my girlfriend. Then Coach Sundhage told me my job was on the line.

Lo'eau LaBonta, 10 years Kai's junior, was a ball girl at a USWNT game Kai was at in Los Angeles. When Kai heard that LaBonta also had Hawaiian heritage, Kai gave her an autographed cleat.
