= Valerie Henderson =

American soccer goalkeeper

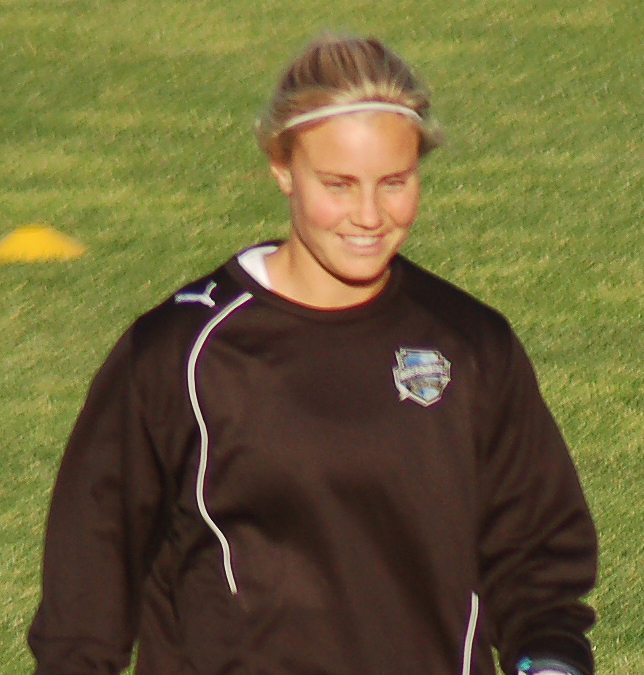
- Henderson in May 2010

Personal information
- Full name: Valerie Kay Henderson
- Date of birth: April 19, 1986 (age 40)
- Place of birth: Concord, California, United States
- Height: 5 ft 7 in (1.70 m)
- Position: Goalkeeper

College career
Years	Team	Apps	(Gls)
2004–2007	UCLA Bruins		

Senior career*
Years	Team	Apps	(Gls)
2008	Pali Blues	7	(0)
2009	Los Angeles Sol	1	(0)
2010–2011	Philadelphia Independence	21	(0)
2011	KIF Örebro	7	(0)
2012	Atlanta Beat		
2013	Western New York Flash	0	(0)

International career^{‡}
- United States U-17
- United States U-19
- United States U-21
	United States U-23	15	(0)
- * Club domestic league appearances and goals as of 03:10, January 12, 2012 (UTC) ‡ National team caps and goals as of 03:10, September 26, 2009 (UTC)

Valerie Kay Henderson (born April 19, 1986) is an American soccer goalkeeper currently playing for the Western New York Flash of the National Women's Soccer League.

She attended Miramonte High School in Orinda, California where she played all 4 years on the varsity women's soccer team. She played four seasons as the starting goalkeeper for the UCLA women's soccer team from 2004 to 2007, and subsequently played at a professional level for Pali Blues, Los Angeles Sol and Philadelphia Independence plus Damallsvenskan side KIF Örebro before signing for the Atlanta Beat in 2012. Henderson was a member of the United States U-23 women's national soccer team. In the 2013 NWSL supplemental draft, Henderson was chosen in the third round, 31st overall, to play for the Western New York Flash in the inaugural NWSL season.
