= Lori Lindsey =

American soccer player (born 1980)

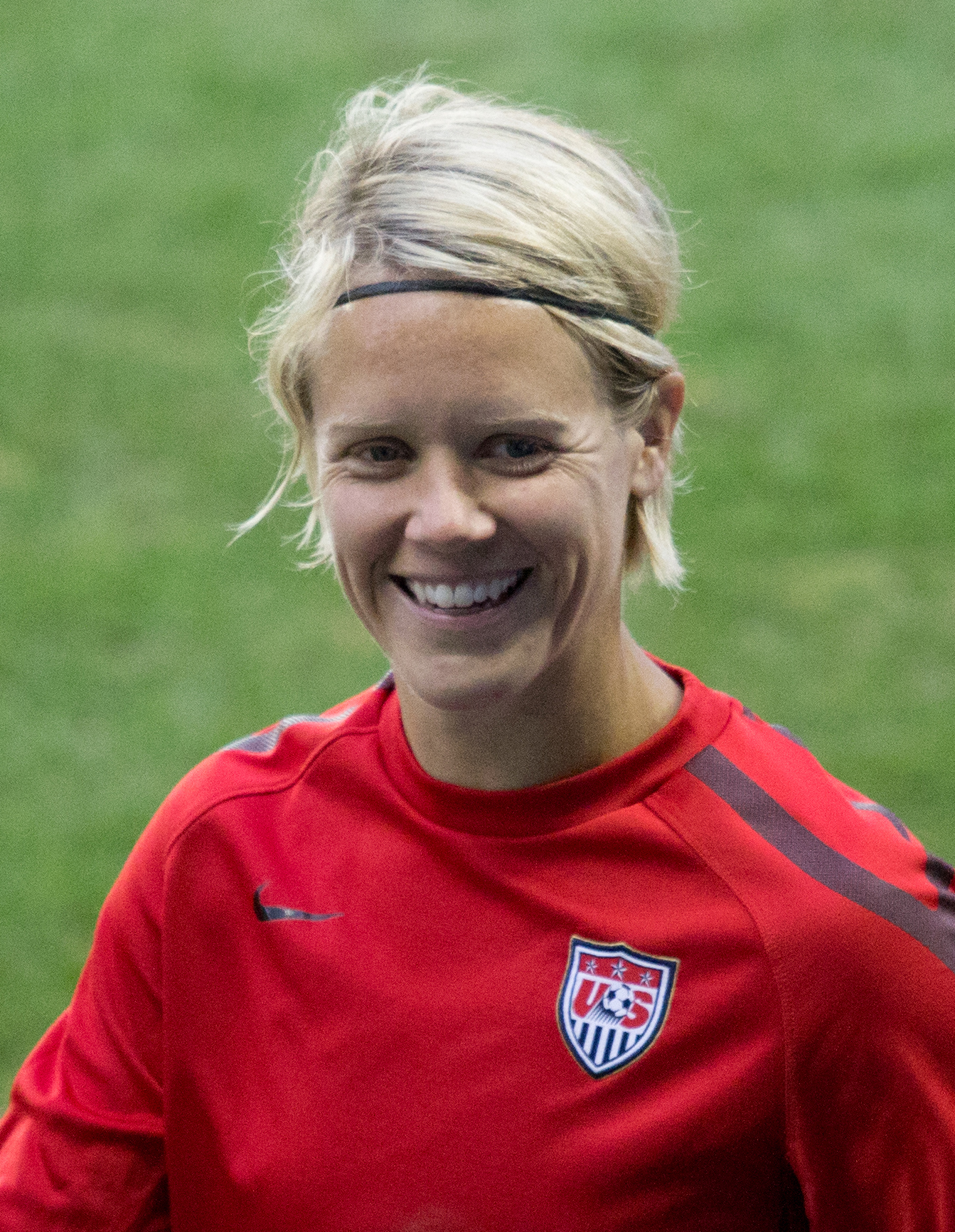
- Lindsey with the USWNT in 2011

Personal information
- Full name: Lori Ann Lindsey
- Date of birth: March 19, 1980 (age 46)
- Place of birth: Indianapolis, Indiana, United States
- Height: 5 ft 5 in (1.65 m)
- Position: Midfielder

College career
Years	Team	Apps	(Gls)
1998–2001	Virginia Cavaliers		

Senior career*
Years	Team	Apps	(Gls)
1997–2000	Indiana Blaze		
2002	San Diego Spirit	20	(2)
2003	Washington Freedom		
2006–2009	Washington Freedom	47	(11)
2010–2011	Philadelphia Independence	35	(2)
2012	Western New York Flash		
2013–2014	Washington Spirit	43	(2)
2013–2015	Canberra United	14	(2)

International career
- United States U-17
- United States U-21
2005–2013	United States	31	(1)
Medal record
Representing United States
FIFA Women's World Cup
Silver medal – second place	2011 Germany	Team
- * Club domestic league appearances and goals

Lori Ann Lindsey (born March 19, 1980) is an American soccer commentator and retired midfielder. Lindsey made 31 appearances for the United States national team. She represented her country at the 2011 FIFA Women's World Cup, where they were runners-up, and was an alternate at the 2012 Summer Olympics.

Lindsey was raised in Indianapolis and played college soccer for the Virginia Cavaliers. She played professionally for the Washington Freedom in the WUSA, the Washington Freedom and Philadelphia Independence in the WPS, the Western New York Flash in the WPSL Elite League, the Washington Spirit in the NWSL, and Canberra United in the W-League in Australia.

== Early life ==
Lindsey grew up in Indianapolis, Indiana. She is the daughter of Larry and Carol Lindsey. A graduate of Pike High School, she was named NSCAA Parade All-American and earned first team All-State honors four consecutive years. Upon graduating, she was the all-time leading prep scorer in Indiana high school history. During high school, Lindsey refereed the indoor soccer games of national teammate Lauren Holiday (née Cheney).

=== University of Virginia ===
Lindsey played at the University of Virginia from 1998 to 2001 and was the school's first-ever Atlantic Coast Conference Player of the Year, winning the award two consecutive years (2000 & 2001) joining Mia Hamm as the only other player to achieve that distinction. She finished sixth all-time scorer in UVA history with 33 goals and 76 points and was named NSCAA Second-Team All-American in 2001 and Third-Team All-American in 2000. She was also a 2001 finalist for the M.A.C. Award. Lindsey was named Female Athlete of the Year at UVA for the 2001–02 academic year.

== Club career ==
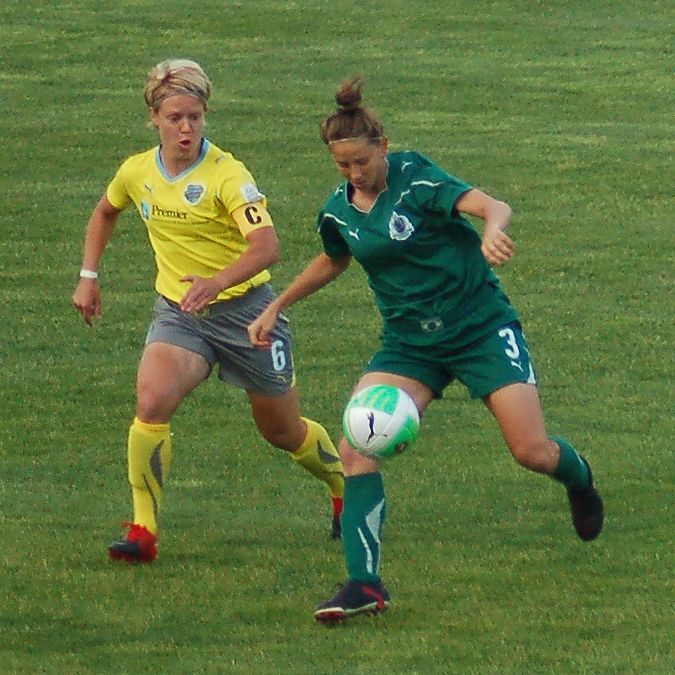
Lindsey playing against Saint Louis Athletica

Lindsey played for the Indiana Blaze of the W-League from 1997 to 2000. In 2002, she was the fourth overall pick in the WUSA draft by the San Diego Spirit. She played in 20 games, starting 13 and scored two goals with five assists. She was traded to the Washington Freedom during the 2003 WUSA Draft and was a member of 2003 Founders Cup III Champions.

Lindsey was a member of the 2007 W-League champions with the Washington Freedom.

In 2009, she played for the Washington Freedom in the inaugural season of the WPS after being taken 17th overall by the Freedom in the WPS General Draft. She started 18 of the 19 games she played for the Freedom, scoring two goals with one assist.

She was the first player taken in the WPS Expansion Draft by the Philadelphia Independence, and played with the club for two seasons (2010, 2011).

Lindsey played for the Western New York Flash during the 2012 season.

In January 2013, Lindsey was allocated to the Washington Spirit in the newly formed National Women's Soccer League. She started 21 games and captained the team in 2013. Following the 2013 NWSL season, she went on loan to Canberra United in the W-League.

In 2014, Lindsey played in 22 games for the Spirit. After the NWSL season, she again went on loan to Canberra United. Canberra won the 2014 W-League Championship by defeating Perth Glory in the Grand Final.

Lindsey announced in August 2014 that she would be retiring at the end of the year.

== International career ==
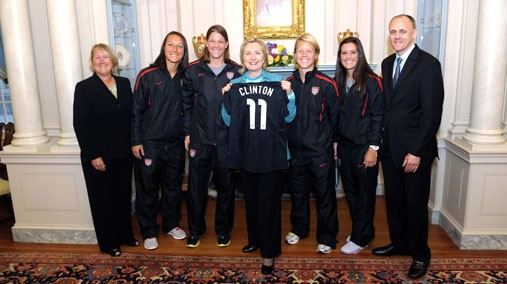
2011 United States women's national soccer team players, Jillian Loyden, Nicole Barnhart, Lori Lindsey, and Ali Krieger, with United States Secretary of State Hillary Clinton

Lindsey played for the U.S. U-16, U-17 and U-21 teams and was a member of the USA's U-21 2001 Nordic Cup champions in Norway.

Lindsey was called into national team training camps in 2009 and 2010 and was in Residency Training Camp at the Home Depot Center in 2004 and 2006. She played one match in the 2011 FIFA Women's World Cup in Germany against Colombia which the U.S. won 3–0. She has been described as one of the best possessors of the ball on the U.S. team and is known for her excellent work rate, superb passing, and willingness to sacrifice for the team. As a central midfielder, she led the team in assists in 2010 with seven.

Lori Lindsey was a member of the 2012 U.S. Women's National Team player pool and was named as an alternate for the 2012 Olympics in London.

Lindsey was nominated for the National Soccer Hall of Fame class of 2018.

== Post-playing career ==
On April 24, 2017, it was announced that Lindsey would join the staff of the Washington Spirit Development Academy as the Strength and Conditioning Director and Assistant Coach.

In 2018, Lindsey served as a commentator for non-televised NWSL games that were broadcast on go90 and the NWSL website.

Nashville SC in 2020 announced Lindsey would serve as its sideline reporter. As of 2026, she is one of the match analysts for Apple TV's Major League Soccer telecasts.

Lindsey served as a match analyst and commentator for the Fox coverage of the 2026 FIFA Men's World Cup.

== Career statistics ==
=== International goals ===
#	Date	Location	Opponent	Score	Result	Competition
1.	January 22, 2012	Vancouver, British Columbia, Canada	Guatemala	6 – 0	13–0	2012 CONCACAF Women's Olympic Qualifying Tournament

== Personal life ==
Lindsey resides in Washington, D.C. She came out publicly as gay in 2012 in an interview with Autostraddle, but notes her sexuality has never been in question to friends and family.
