= Jen Buczkowski =

American former soccer midfielder

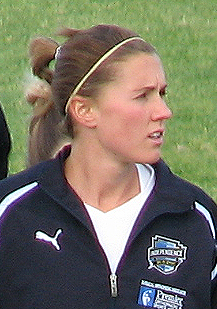
- Jen Buczkowski, 2010

Personal information
- Full name: Jennifer Rose Buczkowski
- Date of birth: April 4, 1985 (age 41)
- Place of birth: Park Ridge, Illinois, U.S.
- Height: 5 ft 5 in (1.65 m)
- Position: Midfielder

College career
Years	Team	Apps	(Gls)
2003–2006	Notre Dame Fighting Irish	103	(20)

Senior career*
Years	Team	Apps	(Gls)
2004	Chicago Cobras	6	(0)
2005–2008	Chicago Gaels	32	(9)
2009	New Jersey Sky Blue	16	(0)
2010–2011	Philadelphia Independence	41	(0)
2012	Chicago Red Stars		
2013–2016	FC Kansas City	66	(2)
Total		161	(11)

International career^{‡}
2003–2004	United States U-19		
2005	United States U-21		
2006–2008	United States U-23		
- * Club domestic league appearances and goals as of October 5, 2015 ‡ National team caps and goals as of 04:50, October 1, 2009 (UTC)

Jennifer Rose Buczkowski (born April 4, 1985) is an American former soccer midfielder. She played for FC Kansas City in the NWSL. She previously played for the Philadelphia Independence and New Jersey Sky Blue of Women's Professional Soccer.

== Early life ==
Buczkowski was born in Elk Grove Village, Illinois. She played three seasons at Elk Grove High School and was named by Gatorade as the 2003 Illinois Player of the Year.

=== University of Notre Dame ===
Buczkowski attended the University of Notre Dame from 2003–2007 and set the Notre Dame record for 103 career games played. During her career at Notre Dame, she scored 77 points (22nd in Notre Dame history), 20 goals, 37 assists and 97 starts. Buczkowski was a three-time NSCAA All-American. She was among the final 15 candidates for the MAC Hermann Award in 2005 and 2006.

== Club career ==
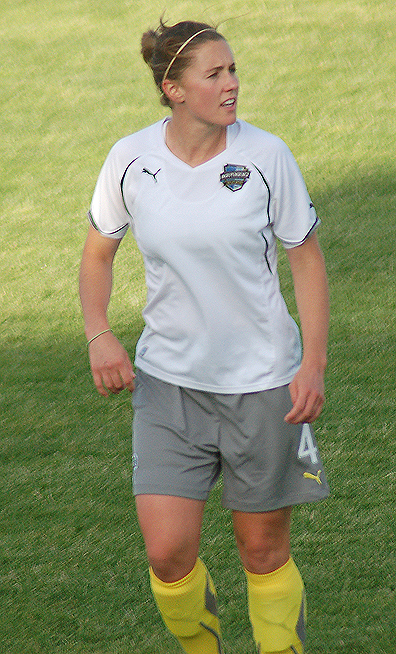
Buczkowski in training, 2010.

=== Sky Blue FC (WPS) ===
Buczkowski was a sixth-round selection (39th overall) in the 2009 WPS College Draft for the New Jersey Sky Blue. The team went on to win the national championship.

=== Philadelphia Independence (WPS) ===
The following season, Buczkowski was selected in the first round of the expansion draft by the Philadelphia Independence. During the 2011 season, Jen won the "Iron Women Award" for playing every minute of the season.

From 2009–2010, Buczkowski started in 38 of 41 games played in the WPS.

=== Chicago Red Stars (WPSL Elite) ===
After the folding of the WPS in early 2012, Buczkowski joined the Chicago Red Stars, in the semi-professional WPSL Elite. The team would go on to come in second to the Western New York Flash after penalty kicks during the WPSL final.

=== FC Kansas City (NWSL), 2013–2016 ===
In 2013, she signed with FC Kansas City for the inaugural season of the NWSL. She started all 66 regular-season matches in the first three seasons of the NWSL for FCKC, the only player in the whole league to do so. Buczkowski won the NWSL Championship in 2014 & 2015 with FCKC.

She retired after FCKC's match on May 13, 2016, as she had enrolled in the DPT Program at the University of Kansas and her school schedule prevented her from playing soccer.

== International career ==
Buczkowski was a member of several youth national teams. She was a member of the U-19 World Cup team in 2003 and played every minute of the U-21 Nordic Cup tournament in 2005, in which the team won the championship.

== Honors and awards ==
FC Kansas City

- NWSL championship: 2014, 2015

== Coaching career ==
Buczkowski joined the University of Notre Dame as Assistant Coach in 2007. In 2011, she joined the Lyons Township Soccer Club coaching staff.
