= Philadelphia Independence =

- Full name: Philadelphia Independence
- Founded: 2009
- Dissolved: 2012
- Stadium: Leslie Quick Stadium; Chester, Pennsylvania, U.S.
- Capacity: 4,500
- Owner: Team Dynamics, LLC
- Head Coach: Paul Riley
- League: Women's Professional Soccer
| Home colors | Away colors |

The Philadelphia Independence was an American professional soccer club that was based in the Philadelphia metropolitan area. The team joined Women's Professional Soccer as an expansion team in 2010 and played its home games at West Chester University's John A. Farrell Stadium. The team played at Widener University's Leslie Quick Stadium in 2011. The Women's Professional Soccer league folded on May 18, 2012, after an earlier announcement that the 2012 season would be suspended.

== History ==
Women's Professional Soccer formally announced the Philadelphia market as its eighth franchise on March 17, 2009. Two months later, the Independence formally unveiled its name and colors at the Franklin Institute in Center City. The "Independence" name referred to the Declaration of Independence, adopted at Independence Hall on July 4, 1776. The official motto was "We the People", referring to the Preamble to the United States Constitution. The Independence succeeded the former Philadelphia Charge of the defunct Women's United Soccer Association.

=== 2010 season ===
In the inaugural season, the Independence finished the regular season as the league's three seed, then won two playoff games in overtime to advance to the WPS Championship. The Independence defeated Washington Freedom at home in the Quarterfinal, then won at Boston in the WPS Super Semifinal. In the championship, the Independence were defeated by FC Gold Pride.

=== 2011 season ===
In the 2011 season, the Independence finished the regular season as the league's two seed, then won the WPS Super Semifinal 2-0 over the magicJack to advance to the WPS Championship. Goals were scored by Tasha Kai 46' and Amy Rodriguez 81'. The Independence faced the Western New York Flash for the WPS Championship where they lost by penalty shootout 1(5) - 1(4).

== Colors and badge ==
The Independence's colors were steel grey, alluding to the city’s industrial history; pearl blue, derived from the civic flag of Philadelphia and further symbolizing the city’s blue-collar heritage; and blazing yellow, representing the Swedish immigrants who first came to the city in 1638. The Independence unveiled its brand on July 4, 2009, to commemorate American Independence Day. The primary logo's contour was a stylized keystone, an architectural shape that referred to Pennsylvania's official nickname, "The Keystone State." This nickname alluded to the commonwealth's economic, social, and political relevance in the original Thirteen Colonies. An eighteenth-century war flag, featuring the team's name and motto, is superimposed across the shield.

== Stadium ==
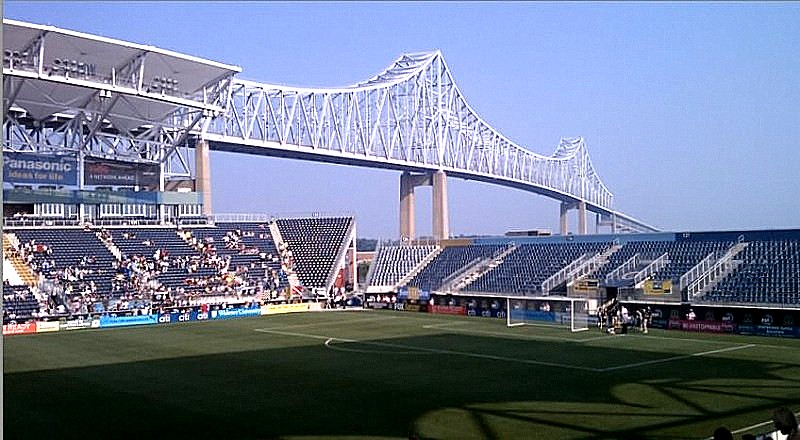
Talen Energy Stadium before semi-final game between Philadelphia Independence and magicJack in 2010--the Independence's final home game ever.

For the 2010 season, the club played at West Chester University's John A. Farrell Stadium. For 2011, it played its home games at Widener University's Leslie Quick Stadium in Chester, Pennsylvania. The Independence elected to utilize PPL Park to host playoff games in 2011. The Independence practiced and held preseason games at their training home, United Sports, in West Bradford Township, Pennsylvania.

| Season | Stadium | Location | Capacity | Notes |
|---|---|---|---|---|
| 2010 | John A. Farrell Stadium | West Chester, Pennsylvania | 7,500 | Regular season home |
| 2010 | United Sports | West Bradford Township, Pennsylvania | 1,200 | Preseason scrimmages |
| 2011 | Leslie Quick Stadium | Chester, Pennsylvania | 4,000 | Regular season home |
| 2011 | PPL Park | Chester, Pennsylvania | 18,500 | Playoff home |
| 2011 | United Sports | West Bradford Township, Pennsylvania | 1,200 | Preseason scrimmages |

== Supporters ==
Grassroots support was instrumental in bringing top-tier women's professional soccer back to the Philadelphia area. The Philadelphia Independence masterfully cultivated relationships with Philadelphia-area girls' travel soccer teams, offering workshops all over the region with Independence players at reasonable costs, sending emails about games, inviting teams to have a formal relationship with the Independence, having local girls' teams on the field for the teams' introductions at every game, and having all players on the field for an extensive post-game autograph and conversation time after every game. The formal grassroots support group for the Independence was nicknamed "The Cheesesteaks".

For men's soccer, this backing came in the form of a supporters' association known as the Sons of Ben, named for Founding Father and Philadelphia icon Benjamin Franklin, founded in January 2007. The Sons of Ben petitioned the men's Major League Soccer league to expand to the Philadelphia market until the official expansion announcement of the men's team, later named the Philadelphia Union, was made in January 2008.

== Players ==
=== 2012 roster ===
Note: Flags indicate national team as defined under FIFA eligibility rules; some limited exceptions apply. Players may hold more than one non-FIFA nationality.

| No. | Pos. | Nation | Player |
|---|---|---|---|
| 0 | FW | USA | Tasha Kai |
| 4 | MF | USA | Jen Buczkowski |
| 7 | DF | USA | Leigh Ann Robinson |
| 14 | MF | USA | Sinead Farrelly |
| 16 | DF | USA | Kia McNeill |
| 21 | FW | ESP | Verónica Boquete |
| 24 | DF | CMR | Estelle Johnson |
| 17 | MF | USA | Lori Chalupny |
| 26 | MF | ISL | Hólmfríður Magnúsdóttir |

| No. | Pos. | Nation | Player |
|---|---|---|---|
| — | FW | USA | Lauren Cheney |
| 21 | FW | USA | Meghan Lenczyk |
| — | MF | ISL | Katrín Ómarsdóttir |
| — | FW | USA | Sarah Hagen (2012 draft pick) |
| — | DF | USA | CoCo Goodson (2012 draft pick) |
| — | FW | USA | Toni Pressley (2012 draft pick) |
| — | GK | USA | Bianca Henninger (2012 draft pick) |
| — | FW | USA | Danielle Foxhoven (2012 draft pick) |
| — | FW | USA | Jasmyne Spencer (2012 draft pick) |

=== Free agents ===
Note: Flags indicate national team as defined under FIFA eligibility rules; some limited exceptions apply. Players may hold more than one non-FIFA nationality.

| No. | Pos. | Nation | Player |
|---|---|---|---|
| 1 | GK | USA | Valerie Henderson |
| 3 | DF | USA | Allison Falk |
| 6 | MF | USA | Lori Lindsey |
| 8 | FW | USA | Amy Rodriguez |
| 9 | FW | USA | Danesha Adams |
| 10 | FW | ENG | Lianne Sanderson |

| No. | Pos. | Nation | Player |
|---|---|---|---|
| 13 | FW | ESP | Laura del Río |
| 15 | DF | USA | Nikki Krzysik |
| 17 | MF | USA | Joanna Lohman |
| 20 | FW | USA | Gina DiMartino |
| 21 | FW | ESP | Veronica Boquete |
| 22 | DF | USA | Lauren Barnes |
| 23 | GK | USA | Nicole Barnhart |

== Coaching staff ==
As of April 7, 2009.

| Position | Name | Nationality |
|---|---|---|
| Head coach | Paul Riley | ENG |
| Assistant coach | Steven Fraser | ENG |
| Assistant coach | Paul Royal | USA |
| Assistant coach | Skip Thorp | USA |

Paul Riley, Steven Fraser and Skip Thorp were selected as coaches for the 2010 WPS All-Star game held in Atlanta.

Paul Riley was voted the WPS Coach of the Year in 2010 for his team's third place regular season performance as an expansion franchise and subsequent playoff berth.

== Year-by-year ==
| Year | League | Regular season | P | W | D | L | Pts | Playoffs | Top scorer | Avg. attendance |
|---|---|---|---|---|---|---|---|---|---|---|
| 2010 | WPS | 3rd Place | 24 | 10 | 10 | 4 | 34 | Runners-up | (United States) Amy Rodriguez (12) | 3,050 |
| 2011 | WPS | 2nd Place | 24 | 10 | 5 | 9 | 35 | Runners-up | (United States) Tasha Kai (9) | 2,774 |

== Ownership ==
The Philadelphia Independence was owned and operated by David and Linda Halstead. The Halsteads purchased the franchise from WPS in March 2009 and orchestrated the team's success in both 2010 and 2011 seasons (they never won a championship, but were runners-up both years). Their first coach was Paul Riley. After the league folded in 2012, the name stopped being used.

== League suspension ==
On January 30, 2012, Women's Professional Soccer announced suspension of the 2012 season, citing several internal organization struggles as the primary cause. Some of these included an ongoing legal battle with an ex-franchise owner and the lack of resources invested into the league.

== See also ==
- Women's Professional Soccer
- National Women's Soccer League
- Philadelphia Charge
