= Los Angeles Sol =

- Full name: Los Angeles Sol
- Nickname: Sol
- Founded: 2007
- Dissolved: 2010
- Stadium: Home Depot Center
- Capacity: 27,000
- League: Women's Professional Soccer
- 2009: WPS Supporters Shield Champions 2009
Home colors	Away colors

The Los Angeles Sol was an American professional soccer club that was based in the Greater Los Angeles, area that participated in Women's Professional Soccer.

The team was co-owned and operated by Anschutz Entertainment Group (AEG) and Blue Star, LLC, a subsidiary of AEG. The team played its home games at Home Depot Center. It was announced on January 28, 2010, that the team would cease operations.

== History ==
The formation of Women's Professional Soccer was announced on September 4, 2007, and it was also announced on that day that a franchise had been awarded to Los Angeles. The Los Angeles Sol was officially unveiled on October 26, 2008. US women's national team midfielder Shannon Boxx was the first player in Sol history when she was allocated to the team on September 16, 2008.

=== 2009 season ===
The team played its first game on March 29, 2009, against the Washington Freedom resulting in a 2–0 victory. The first goal in club and league history was recorded in the sixth minute of the match, when defender Allison Falk out-jumped a crowd of Freedom defenders in the penalty area to head in a free kick from Japan national team star Aya Miyama.

The Sol won their next two games as well, totaling a +5 goal differential, setting them apart early as the best team in the league. Though they did not win either of their next two games, they never dropped from first place in the table, and then went on an eleven-game unbeaten streak, with three draws and eight wins, at times having twice the number of points as the second-place team. They then lost to the Saint Louis Athletica in their last home game of the season, which ended their streak and kept alive the hopes that some team other than the Sol could win the regular season title, but a 0–0 draw against FC Gold Pride (who was the worst team in the league) gave the Sol the regular season title with two games to spare. The lost 1–3 to the Chicago Red Stars and won 2–1 against the Boston Breakers to end their regular season, the win giving the Sol the title of the first team to beat every other team in the league. They finished the season with 41 pts. (a 12–3–5 record) and a +17 goal differential.

Being regular season champions, the Sol received a bye to the August 22nd championship match. They lost 0–1 to Sky Blue FC who made the playoffs when potential invitees Boston earned no points in their final regular season match against the Sol.

=== Sale and folding ===
In November, AEG gave their share of the Sol back to WPS. WPS ran the Sol for the next three months, completing trades, changing coaches, and participating in the 2010 WPS Draft. However, the potential ownership group that WPS had been working with to take on the Sol backed out "in the 11th hour" according to league commissioner Tonya Antonuci. Following this failure to sell the team, the league announced its decision to disband the Sol on January 27, 2010, and organized a dispersal draft for the 19 players under contract to be held February 4.

== Players ==
=== 2009 Roster ===
Note: Flags indicate national team as defined under FIFA eligibility rules; some limited exceptions apply. Players may hold more than one non-FIFA nationality.

No.	Pos.	Nation	Player
20	MF	FRA	Camille Abily
5	DF	USA	Greer Barnes
11	FW	USA	Brittany Bock
17	MF	USA	Liz Bogus
7	MF	USA	Shannon Boxx
0	GK	USA	Brittany Cameron
14	DF	USA	Stephanie Cox
9	FW	CHN	Han Duan
3	DF	USA	Allison Falk
19	DF	CAN	Martina Franko

No.	Pos.	Nation	Player
21	DF	SWE	Johanna Frisk
1	GK	USA	Valerie Henderson
18	MF	USA	Katie Larkin
23	GK	CAN	Karina LeBlanc
22	MF	USA	Manya Makoski
10	FW	BRA	Marta
8	MF	JPN	Aya Miyama
12	MF	USA	Lisa Sari
4	MF	USA	Aly Wagner
6	MF	USA	McCall Zerboni

== Milestones ==
- First game: 2–0 vs. Washington Freedom, Home Depot Center; March 29, 2009
- Largest win: 4–0 vs. Chicago Red Stars, Home Depot Center; June 27, 2009
- Worst defeat: 1–3 vs. Chicago Red Stars, Toyota Park; August 2, 2009

== See also ==
- Women's Professional Soccer
- National Women's Soccer League
- Angel City FC
