= 2010 FC Gold Pride season =

FC Gold Pride
2010 season
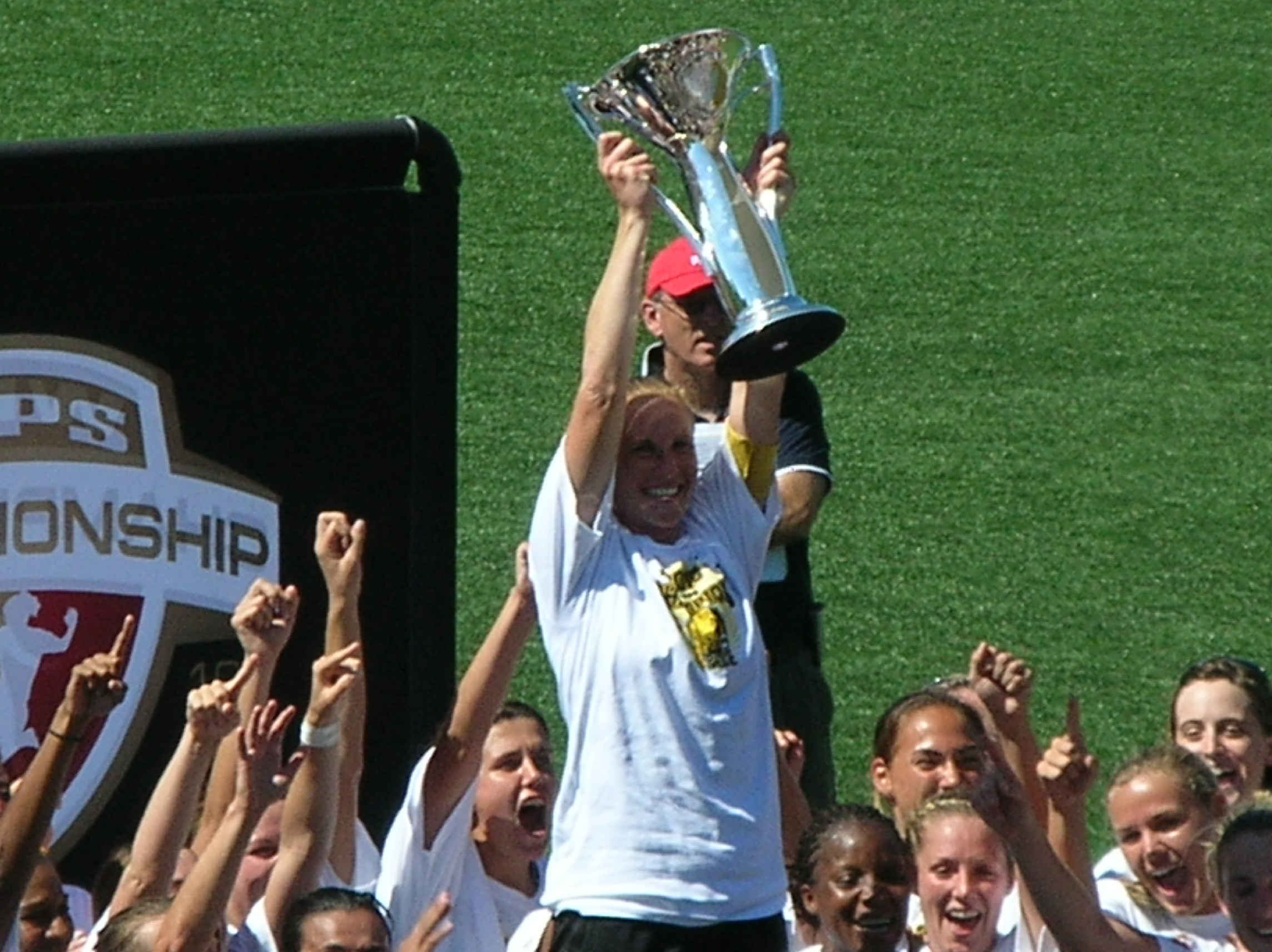
- FC Gold Pride raise the 2010 WPS Championship trophy
- Owner: NeSmith family
- Head coach: Albertin Montoya
- Stadium: Castro Valley Athletic Stadium (until Jun 19); Pioneer Stadium (since Jun 27)
- WPS: 1st
- WPS Playoffs: Champions
- Top goalscorer: League: Marta (19); All: Marta (20)
- Highest home attendance: 4,003 (Sep 11 vs. PHI)
- Lowest home attendance: 2,431 (Jul 11 vs. WAS)
- Average home league attendance: 3,056
- Biggest win: 6–1 (Aug 28 at ATL)
- Biggest defeat: 0–2 (two times)
Primary colors	Secondary colors

The 2010 FC Gold Pride season was the team's second and final season as a professional women's soccer team. FC Gold Pride played in the Women's Professional Soccer league (WPS), the top tier of women's soccer in the United States. After finishing in last place during the 2009 season, the team won the 2010 WPS Championship on September 26, 2010, 4–0 over Philadelphia Independence. On November 16, FC Gold Pride announced that it had ceased operations.

== Summary ==
=== 2009–10 off-season moves ===
The only player FC Gold Pride lost to the 2009 WPS Expansion Draft was defender Leigh Ann Robinson, chosen by the Atlanta Beat. Over the course of the offseason, the club traded Allison Whitworth to the Beat for the 10th- and 12th-overall picks in the 2010 WPS Draft, lost team co-captain Leslie Osborne and assists leader Tiffany Weimer to the Boston Breakers in free agency, loaned Eriko Arakawa back to her former Nadeshiko League club NTV Beleza for the remainder of her WPS contract, waived contract options for Adriane, Érika, and Formiga, and in February 2010 also waived Brandi Chastain.

The club signed Canadian player Candace Chapman on October 8, 2009, and after scouting the 2009 UEFA Women's Championship, the club signed Norwegian international Solveig Gulbrandsen on December 10.

FC Gold Pride acquired Los Angeles Sol player Camille Abily in exchange for midfielder Tina DiMartino, FC Gold Pride's top 2009 WPS Draft pick, and the 14th-overall pick in the 2010 draft and rights to a 2009 international discovery player. In the 2010 WPS Draft, FC Gold Pride selected 2009 Hermann Trophy winner Kelley O'Hara, New Zealand international Ali Riley, and 2008 U-20 World Cup champions Becky Edwards and Kaley Fountain, among others.

The Los Angeles Sol ceased operations not long afterward, and in the ensuing 2010 WPS Dispersal Draft FC Gold Pride acquired Marta, Kiki Bosio, and Lindsay Browne. The club separately signed Sol goalkeeper Brittany Cameron as a free agent.

=== Regular season ===
FC Gold Pride started fast and kept its momentum running throughout the 2010 season. Despite the departure of Solveig Gulbrandsen in July and waiving draft pick Kaley Fountain, the Pride dominated the league's regular season.

=== Championship ===
On September 26, FC Gold Pride won their first WPS Championship by defeating the Philadelphia Independence 4–0.

Three members of the team garnered end of season honors: Marta was named Player of the Year and won the Golden Boot, both for the second consecutive season; Nicole Barnhart was named Goalkeeper of the Year; and Ali Riley was named Rookie of the Year. On November 16, 2010, after the close of the 2010 season, the league announced that FC Gold Pride had folded and would not return for the 2011 season.

== Team ==
=== Squad ===
As of August 30, 2010.

Note: Flags indicate national team as defined under FIFA eligibility rules; some limited exceptions apply. Players may hold more than one non-FIFA nationality.

No.	Pos.	Nation	Player
1	GK	USA	Nicole Barnhart
2	MF	USA	Kimberly Yokers
3	DF	NZL	Ali Riley
4	DF	USA	Rachel Buehler
5	DF	CAN	Candace Chapman
7	FW	USA	Kelley O'Hara
9	FW	USA	Kandace Wilson
10	FW	BRA	Marta
11	FW	USA	Kiki Bosio
12	FW	CAN	Christine Sinclair

No.	Pos.	Nation	Player
13	MF	USA	Kristen Graczyk
14	DF	USA	Becky Edwards
15	FW	USA	Tiffeny Milbrett
16	MF	USA	Rosie Tantillo
17	DF	USA	Niki Cross
18	GK	USA	Brittany Cameron
19	DF	USA	Carrie Dew
20	MF	FRA	Camille Abily
21	GK	USA	Erin Guthrie
77	MF	USA	Shannon Boxx

==== Transactions ====
2010 FC Gold Pride draft selections
R	#	P	Name	College
1	3	FW	Kelley O'Hara	Stanford
1	10	DF	Ali Riley	Stanford
2	12	DF	Becky Edwards	Florida St.
2	20	FW	Kaley Fountain	Wake Forest
4	32	GK	Erin Guthrie	Rutgers
5	41	MF	Ashley Bowyer	Ohio St.
6	50	DF	Elizabeth Harkin	Arizona St.
7	59	DF	Lauren Wilmoth	UCLA

Transfers in:

- Shannon Boxx, June 4, from Saint Louis Athletica via dispersal

Transfers out:

- Solveig Gulbrandsen, July 17, to Stabæk IF

Waived or released:

- Ashley Bowyer, June 4, released
- Kaley Fountain, June 4, released but retained as a developmental player; later waived, signed with Atlanta Beat on Aug. 9

== Competitions ==
=== Key ===
Win Draw Loss

=== Regular season ===
April 11, 2010 1	Saint Louis Athletica	2–0	FC Gold Pride	Fenton, Missouri
3 p.m. CDT		Report		Stadium: Anheuser-Busch Soccer Park; Attendance: 3,356

April 17, 2010 2	FC Gold Pride	3–1	Sky Blue FC	Castro Valley, California
		Report		Stadium: Castro Valley Athletic Stadium; Attendance: 3,757

April 24, 2010 3	FC Gold Pride	2–1	Atlanta Beat	Castro Valley, California
		Report		Stadium: Castro Valley Athletic Stadium; Attendance: 3,002

May 1, 2010 4	Sky Blue FC	0–1	FC Gold Pride	Piscataway, New Jersey
		Report		Stadium: Yurcak Field; Attendance: 3,798

May 8, 2010 5	FC Gold Pride	2–0	Chicago Red Stars	Castro Valley, California
		Report		Stadium: Castro Valley Athletic Stadium; Attendance: 3,153

May 14, 2010 6	Boston Breakers	1–2	FC Gold Pride	Cambridge, Massachusetts
	Smith 22' (Cheney) (yellow card) 70'; Osborne (yellow card) 85'	Box; Report	Marta 15' (Milbrett), 37' (Gulbrandsen)	Stadium: Harvard Stadium; Attendance: 5,283; Referee: Ted Unkel

May 29, 2010 7	Chicago Red Stars	1–0	FC Gold Pride	Bridgeview, Illinois
		Report		Stadium: Toyota Park; Attendance: 3,845

June 5, 2010 8	FC Gold Pride	1–1	Washington Freedom	Castro Valley, California
		Report		Stadium: Castro Valley Athletic Stadium; Attendance: 3,442

June 13, 2010 9	Philadelphia Independence	1–3	FC Gold Pride	West Chester, Pennsylvania
		Report		Stadium: John A. Farrell Stadium; Attendance: 2,616

June 19, 2010 10	FC Gold Pride	1–0	Boston Breakers	Castro Valley, California
		Report		Stadium: Castro Valley Athletic Stadium; Attendance: 3,588

June 27, 2010 11	FC Gold Pride	0–2	Sky Blue FC	Hayward, California
		Report		Stadium: Pioneer Stadium; Attendance: 2,478

July 3, 2010 12	Atlanta Beat	0–4	FC Gold Pride	Kennesaw, Georgia
		Report		Stadium: Kennesaw State University Soccer Stadium; Attendance: 3,111

July 11, 2010 13	FC Gold Pride	3–2	Washington Freedom	Hayward, California
	Marta 13' (pen.), 65' (Sinclair); Gulbrandsen 70' (Abily)	Box; Report	Gabarra (red card) 28'; Welsh (yellow card) 58'; Mykjaland 80' (Bock); Marshall 90'	Stadium: Pioneer Stadium; Attendance: 2,431; Referee: Bryan Roslund

July 17, 2010 14	FC Gold Pride	2–0	Philadelphia Independence	Hayward, California
	Sinclair 45' (Gulbrandsen), 81' (Abily)	Box; Report		Stadium: Pioneer Stadium; Attendance: 2,576; Referee: Allan Chapman

July 21, 2010 14	Boston Breakers	1–2	FC Gold Pride	Cambridge, Massachusetts
		Report		Stadium: Harvard Stadium; Attendance: 3,052

July 24, 2010 15	Washington Freedom	1–4	FC Gold Pride	Boyds, Maryland
		Report		Stadium: Maryland SoccerPlex; Attendance: 4,809

August 1, 2010 16	Atlanta Beat	0–0	FC Gold Pride	Kennesaw, Georgia
		Report		Stadium: Kennesaw State University Soccer Stadium; Attendance: 3,242

August 8, 2010 17	FC Gold Pride	0–0	Chicago Red Stars	Hayward, California
	Wilson (yellow card) 62'	Box; Report		Stadium: Pioneer Stadium; Attendance: 2,470

August 14, 2010 18	FC Gold Pride	0–0	Washington Freedom	Hayward, California
		Report		Stadium: Pioneer Stadium; Attendance: 3,328

August 22, 2010 19	Chicago Red Stars	2–3	FC Gold Pride	Bridgeview, Illinois
5:00 p.m. CDT		Report		Stadium: Toyota Park; Attendance: 6,089

August 28, 2010 20	Atlanta Beat	1–6	FC Gold Pride	Kennesaw, Georgia
7:00 p.m. EDT		Report		Stadium: Kennesaw State University Soccer Stadium; Attendance: 4,289

September 1, 2010 20	Sky Blue FC	1–1	FC Gold Pride	Piscataway, New Jersey
7:00 p.m. EDT		Report		Stadium: Yurcak Field; Attendance: 3,412

September 5, 2010 21	FC Gold Pride	2–0	Boston Breakers	Hayward, California
6:00 p.m. PDT		Report		Stadium: Pioneer Stadium; Attendance: 2,447

September 11, 2010 22	FC Gold Pride	4–1	Philadelphia Independence	Hayward, California
5:30 p.m. PDT				Stadium: Pioneer Stadium; Attendance: 4,003

==== Regular season standings ====
Pos	Team	Pld	W	D	L	GF	GA	GD	Pts	Qualification
1	FC Gold Pride	24	16	5	3	46	19	+27	53	Advance to Championship
2	Boston Breakers	24	10	6	8	36	28	+8	36	Advance to Super Semifinal
3	Philadelphia Independence	24	10	4	10	37	36	+1	34	Advance to First Round
4	Washington Freedom	24	8	7	9	33	33	0	31	Advance to First Round
5	Sky Blue FC	24	7	7	10	20	31	−11	28	
6	Chicago Red Stars	24	7	6	11	21	27	−6	27	
7	Atlanta Beat	24	5	6	13	20	40	−20	21	
8	Saint Louis Athletica	6	2	3	1	9	8	+1	9	Team withdrawn

Source: WPS Soccerway
Rules for classification: 1) points, 2) goal difference, 3) head-to-head result.

==== Results summary ====
Overall								Home						Away					
Pld	W	D	L	GF	GA	GD	Pts	W	D	L	GF	GA	GD	W	D	L	GF	GA	GD
24	16	5	3	46	19	+27	53	9	3	1	20	8	+12	7	2	2	26	11	+15

Last updated: September 11, 2010.
Source: 2010 WPS Schedule

==== Results by matchday ====
Matchday	1	2	3	4	5	6	7	8	9	10	11	12	13	14	15	16	17	18	19	20	21	22	23	24
Stadium	A	H	H	A	H	A	A	H	A	H	H	H	H	H	A	A	A	H	H	A	A	A	H	H
Result	L	W	W	W	W	W	L	D	W	W	L	W	W	W	W	W	D	D	D	W	W	D	W	W

Updated to match(es) played on September 11, 2010. Source: 2010 WPS Schedule
A = Away; H = Home; W = Win; D = Draw; L = Loss

=== WPS Championship ===
September 26, 2010

FC Gold Pride	4–0	Philadelphia Independence
Sinclair 16', 53' (Marta); Wilson 28' (Marta); Marta 90' (Wilson)	Box; Report

Pioneer Stadium, Hayward, California
Attendance: 5,228
Referee: Jennifer Bennett

== Statistics ==
Regular-season player statistics
#	Pos.	Nat.	Name	MP	MS	Min.	G	A	YC	RC
20	MF	(France) FRA	Camille Abily	17	13	1103	1	4	0	0
1	GK	(United States) USA	Nicole Barnhart	21	21	1880	0	0	0	0
11	FW	(United States) USA	Kiki Bosio	16	7	675	0	0	0	0
77	MF	(United States) USA	Shannon Boxx	20	19	1,705	1	5	6	0
4	DF	(United States) USA	Rachel Buehler	22	22	1,958	1	0	1	0
18	GK	(United States) USA	Brittany Cameron	3	3	270	0	0	0	0
5	DF	(Canada) CAN	Candace Chapman	21	21	1880	0	0	2	0
17	DF	(United States) USA	Niki Cross	4	2	270	0	0	0	0
19	DF	(United States) USA	Carrie Dew	15	10	972	1	1	1	0
14	DF	(United States) USA	Becky Edwards	24	20	1,815	1	1	2	0
14	DF	(United States) USA	Kaley Fountain	5	1	62	0	0	0	0
13	MF	(United States) USA	Kristen Graczyk	16	10	899	0	0	0	0
21	GK	(United States) USA	Erin Guthrie	0	1	10	0	0	0	0
8	MF	(Norway) NOR	Solveig Gulbrandsen	8	6	441	1	2	0	0
10	FW	(Brazil) BRA	Marta	24	24	2,160	19	6	3	0
15	FW	(United States) USA	Tiffeny Milbrett	22	15	1,237	6	2	0	0
7	FW	(United States) USA	Kelley O'Hara	18	16	1,445	6	5	4	0
3	DF	(New Zealand) NZL	Ali Riley	23	23	2,045	0	3	1	0
12	FW	(Canada) CAN	Christine Sinclair	23	23	2,054	10	9	1	0
16	MF	(United States) USA	Rosie Tantillo	1	1	27	0	0	0	0
9	FW	(United States) USA	Kandace Wilson	24	15	1488	0	0	2	0
2	MF	(United States) USA	Kimberly Yokers	5	1	167	0	1	0	0
Total							39	29	19	0

== Awards ==
=== WPS awards ===
- Michelle Akers Player of the Year Award: Marta
- Goalkeeper of the Year: Nicole Barnhart
- Rookie of the Year: Ali Riley
- WPS Golden Boot: Marta
- Regular-season champions
- League champions

=== WPS All-Star Team ===
2010 WPS All-Star Team selections
Pos.	Nat.	Name	Selected as
GK	(United States) USA	Nicole Barnhart	Replacement
DF	(United States) USA	Rachel Buehler	Starter
MF	(United States) USA	Shannon Boxx	Starter
MF	(Brazil) BRA	Marta	Starter, captain
FW	(United States) USA	Kelley O'Hara	Selection
FW	(United States) USA	Christine Sinclair	Starter
