= List of FC Gold Pride players =

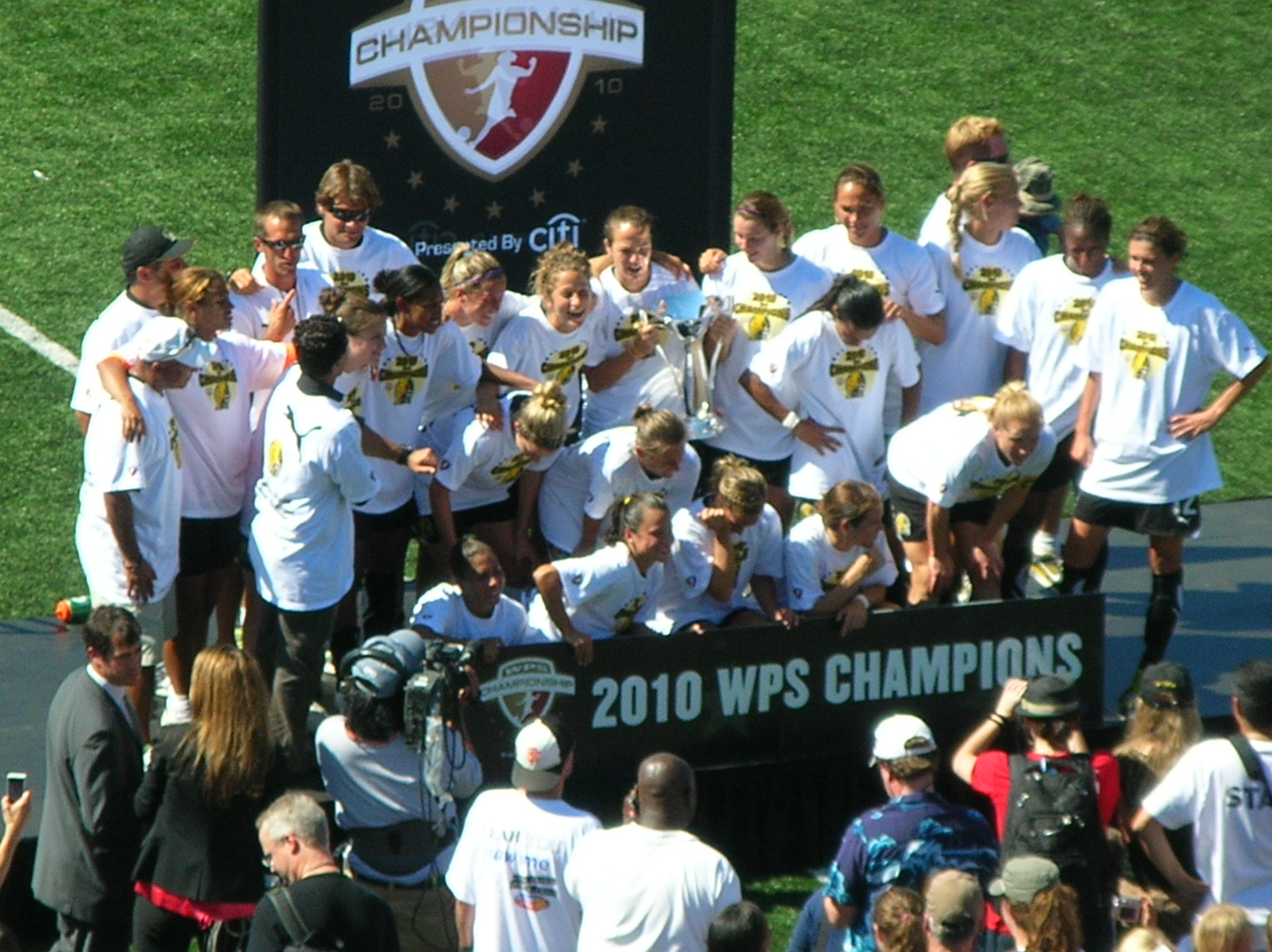
FC Gold Pride won the 2010 WPS Championship

FC Gold Pride was an American professional women's soccer club which began play in the Women's Professional Soccer (WPS) league's inaugural season in 2009 and dissolved after the 2010 season. All FC Gold Pride players who have appeared for the team in an official competition or have been contracted to play for the team are listed below. This list does not include pre-season training rosters, short-term players, or discovery players who did not appear for the club.

== Key ==
- The list is ordered first by total number of appearances, and then if necessary in alphabetical order.
- Appearances as a substitute and in the 2010 WPS Championship match are included.
- Statistics are correct as of September 26, 2010, the end of the 2010 WPS season.

Positions key
GK	Goalkeeper
DF	Defender
MF	Midfielder
FW	Forward

Nationality
Unless otherwise noted, the nationality of a player is determined by the country they represented in international play, or if said player has not played international football then by their country of birth.
Position
Playing positions are listed according to the player's roster designation as of the list's most recent update.
FC Gold Pride career
FC Gold Pride career is defined as the first and last calendar years in which the player was rostered for the club.
Appearances
This list counts appearances only in official WPS competitions, including the regular season and playoffs.

== Players ==
#	Pos.	Nat.	Name	FC Gold Pride career	MP	MS	Min.	G	A
15	FW	(United States) USA	Tiffeny Milbrett	2009–2010	42	30	2,630	10	3
12	FW	(Canada) CAN	Christine Sinclair	2009–2010	41	40	3,556	18	10
4	DF	(United States) USA	Rachel Buehler	2009–2010	40	40	3,578	2	1
1	GK	(United States) USA	Nicole Barnhart	2009–2010	38	38	3,410	0	0
13	MF	(United States) USA	Kristen Graczyk	2009–2010	37	28	2,498	0	0
9	FW	(United States) USA	Kandace Wilson	2009–2010	33	22	2,133	0	1
19	DF	(United States) USA	Carrie Dew	2009–2010	32	27	2,401	2	1
14	DF	(United States) USA	Becky Edwards	2010	25	21	1,905	1	1
10	FW	(Brazil) BRA	Marta	2010	25	25	2,250	20	8
3	DF	(New Zealand) NZL	Ali Riley	2010	24	24	2,135	0	3
5	DF	(Canada) CAN	Candace Chapman	2010	22	22	1,960	0	0
77	MF	(United States) USA	Shannon Boxx	2010	21	20	1,780	1	5
30	FW	(Japan) JPN	Eriko Arakawa	2009	19	11	1,088	1	1
7	FW	(United States) USA	Kelley O'Hara	2010	19	16	1,469	6	5
10	MF	(United States) USA	Leslie Osborne	2009	19	18	1,622	0	0
20	MF	(France) FRA	Camille Abily	2010	18	14	1,169	1	4
5	MF	(United States) USA	Tina DiMartino	2009	18	18	1,530	0	1
7	DF	(United States) USA	Leigh Ann Robinson	2009	18	15	1,339	1	0
11	FW	(United States) USA	Kiki Bosio	2010	17	7	690	0	0
31	MF	(Brazil) BRA	Formiga	2009	16	15	1,363	0	0
8	FW	(United States) USA	Tiffany Weimer	2009	15	10	745	1	3
2	MF	(United States) USA	Kimberly Yokers	2009–2010	14	3	405	1	1
21	MF	(Brazil) BRA	Adriane	2009	12	4	451	1	1
6	MF	(United States) USA	Brandi Chastain	2009	10	5	450	0	0
8	MF	(Norway) NOR	Solveig Gulbrandsen	2010	8	6	441	1	2
20	DF	(Brazil) BRA	Érika	2009	7	5	423	0	0
3	DF	(United States) USA	Marisa Abegg	2009	6	3	335	0	0
14	DF	(United States) USA	Kaley Fountain	2010	5	1	62	0	0
17	DF	(United States) USA	Niki Cross	2010	4	2	270	0	0
23	DF	(United States) USA	Lindsay Massengale	2009	4	2	193	0	0
16	GK	(United States) USA	Allison Whitworth	2009	4	4	360	0	0
14	DF	(United States) USA	Greer Barnes	2009	3	3	270	0	0
18	GK	(United States) USA	Brittany Cameron	2010	3	3	270	0	0
11	MF	(Brazil) BRA	Sissi	2009	3	1	128	0	0
16	MF	(United States) USA	Rosie Tantillo	2010	1	1	27	0	0
21	GK	(United States) USA	Erin Guthrie	2010	0	1	10	0	0
6	MF	(United States) USA	Ashley Bowyer	2010	0	0	0	0	0
22	GK	(United States) USA	Meagan McCray	2009	0	0	0	0	0
