= 2009 FC Gold Pride season =

FC Gold Pride
2009 season
- Chairman: NeSmith Family
- Head coach: Albertin Montoya
- WPS: 7th
- WPS Playoffs: DNQ
- Top goalscorer: Christine Sinclair (6)
- Highest home attendance: 6,459 (Apr 5 vs. BOS)
- Lowest home attendance: 2,203 (Jul 19 vs. BOS)
- Average home league attendance: 3,667
- Biggest win: 1 goal (4 times)
- Biggest defeat: 2 goals (4 times)
Primary colors	Secondary colors

The 2009 FC Gold Pride season was the team's first as a professional women's soccer team. FC Gold Pride played in the Women's Professional Soccer league (WPS), the top tier of women's soccer in the United States.

== Summary ==
=== Preseason ===
FC Gold Pride played two scrimmages against the Los Angeles Sol, losing both. They also posted a 6-1 win over the University of California women's soccer team and a 3-0 win over an "All-Star" team of local college players.

=== Regular season ===
FC Gold Pride won their inaugural WPS game against the Boston Breakers on April 5, 2009. The club remained in strong contention until defender Kandace Wilson was injured during a home game against the Los Angeles Sol. After that, FC Gold Pride's second loss at the hands of the Washington Freedom marked the beginning of the club's slide to the bottom of the WPS rankings, where it would remain for the rest of the season. The club's transactions in the wake of Wilson's injury included signing Los Angeles Sol draftee Greer Barnes, elevating developmental player Marisa Abegg to the full roster, and returning Sissi to the field as a player.

In the end, FC Gold Pride failed to make the 2009 Women's Professional Soccer Playoffs, after a must-win game against the Saint Louis Athletica ended in a 1–1 draw. The club finally snapped its ten-game winless streak with a final 3–2 win against the Washington Freedom on August 1, 2009. However, a last loss to Sky Blue FC and a tie with Saint Louis Athletica did not allow FC Gold Pride to avoid finishing last in the WPS standings.

== Team ==
=== Squad ===
As of the end of the 2009 WPS season.

Note: Flags indicate national team as defined under FIFA eligibility rules; some limited exceptions apply. Players may hold more than one non-FIFA nationality.

No.	Pos.	Nation	Player
1	GK	(United States) USA	Nicole Barnhart
2	MF	(United States) USA	Kimberly Yokers
3	DF	(United States) USA	Marisa Abegg
4	DF	(United States) USA	Rachel Buehler
5	MF	(United States) USA	Christina DiMartino
6	MF	(United States) USA	Brandi Chastain
7	DF	(United States) USA	Leigh Ann Robinson
8	FW	(United States) USA	Tiffany Weimer
9	FW	(United States) USA	Kandace Wilson
10	MF	(United States) USA	Leslie Osborne
11	MF	(Brazil) BRA	Sissi (D)
12	FW	(Canada) CAN	Christine Sinclair

No.	Pos.	Nation	Player
13	DF	(United States) USA	Kristen Graczyk
14	DF	(United States) USA	Greer Barnes (D)
15	FW	(United States) USA	Tiffeny Milbrett
18	GK	(United States) USA	Allison Whitworth
19	DF	(United States) USA	Carrie Dew
20	DF	(Brazil) BRA	Érika
21	MF	(Brazil) BRA	Adriane
22	GK	(United States) USA	Meagan McCray (D)
23	DF	(United States) USA	Lindsay Massengale (D)
30	FW	(Japan) JPN	Eriko Arakawa
31	MF	(Brazil) BRA	Formiga

==== Transfers ====
- IN: Greer Barnes from Los Angeles Sol (July 2009)

== Competitions ==
=== Key ===
Win Draw Loss

=== Regular season ===
April 5, 2009 1	FC Gold Pride	2–1	Boston Breakers	Santa Clara, California
	Arakawa 16'; Milbrett 91+'	Report	Smith 79'	Stadium: Buck Shaw Stadium; Attendance: 6,459; Referee: Jennifer Bennett

April 11, 2009 2	Sky Blue FC	1–1	FC Gold Pride	Bridgewater Township, New Jersey
	Bardsley (yellow card) 37'; O'Reilly 77'	Report	Dew 34'	Stadium: TD Bank Ballpark; Attendance: 2,753; Referee: Kari Seitz

April 19, 2009 3	Los Angeles Sol	1–0	FC Gold Pride	Carson, California
	Wagner (yellow card) 10'; Marta 48'	Report		Stadium: Home Depot Center; Attendance: 6,119; Referee: Veronica Brito

April 26, 2009 4	FC Gold Pride	3–4	Washington Freedom	Santa Clara, California
	Milbrett 31'; Weimer 76'; Sinclair 84'	Report	Wambach 19' 91+'; Lindsey 52'; Long 72'	Stadium: Buck Shaw Stadium; Attendance: 3,321; Referee: Sandra Serafini

May 3, 2009 5	FC Gold Pride	1–0	Sky Blue FC	Santa Clara, California
	Robinson 87'	Report	Parker (yellow card) 44'	Stadium: Buck Shaw Stadium; Attendance: 2,533; Referee: Felisha Mariscal

May 9, 2009 6	Saint Louis Athletica	1–0	FC Gold Pride	Edwardsville, Illinois
	Chalupny 17'; Weber (yellow card) 56'	Report	Milbrett (yellow card) 56'	Stadium: Ralph Korte Stadium; Attendance: 3,860; Referee: Dallas Malhiwsky

May 16, 2009 7	Chicago Red Stars	0–1	FC Gold Pride	Bridgeview, Illinois
	Klein (yellow card) 63'	Report	Sinclair 31'; Graczyk (yellow card) 66'	Stadium: Toyota Park; Attendance: 4,884; Referee: Kari Seitz

May 24, 2009 8	FC Gold Pride	0–2	Los Angeles Sol	Santa Clara, California
	Érika (yellow card) 33'	Report	Abily 28' (pen.); Marta (yellow card) 45+'; Duan 87'	Stadium: Buck Shaw Stadium; Attendance: 6,280; Referee: Daniel Radford

May 31, 2009 9	Washington Freedom	3–1	FC Gold Pride	Boyds, Maryland
	Graczyk 17' (o.g.); De Vanna 23'; Whitehill 33'; Bompastor (yellow card) 44'	Report	Formiga (yellow card) 45+'; Sinclair 58'; Dew (yellow card) 65' (yellow-red card) 83'; Chastain (yellow card) 68'	Stadium: Maryland SoccerPlex; Attendance: 4,474; Referee: Sandra Serafini

June 7, 2009 10	FC Gold Pride	1–1	Chicago Red Stars	Santa Clara, California
	Sinclair 15'; Osborne (yellow card) 44'	Report	Igwe (yellow card) 43'; Cristiane 48'; Östberg (yellow card) 66'	Stadium: Buck Shaw Stadium; Attendance: 2,957; Referee: Veronica Brito

June 17, 2009 11	Boston Breakers	1–1	FC Gold Pride	Cambridge, Massachusetts
	Nobis 77' (Smith)	Box; Report	Sinclair 16'	Stadium: Harvard Stadium; Attendance: 3,128; Referee: Margaret Domka

June 21, 2009 12	Los Angeles Sol	2–0	FC Gold Pride	Carson, California
3:00 p.m. PDT	Abily 18' (Franko); Marta 26' (Boxx)	Box; Report		Stadium: Home Depot Center; Attendance: 4,593; Referee: Daniel Fitzgerald

July 5, 2009 14	FC Gold Pride	0–1	Saint Louis Athletica	Santa Clara, California
5:00 p.m. PDT	Buehler (yellow card) 63'	Box; Report	Chalupny 74'	Stadium: Buck Shaw Stadium; Attendance: 2,861; Referee: Veronica Brito

July 12, 2009 15	Chicago Red Stars	3–1	FC Gold Pride	Bridgeview, Illinois
	Cristiane 32' (pen.), 45+1' (Rapinoe), 66' (Tarpley); Tarpley (yellow card) 45'; Carney (yellow card) 63'; Lloyd (yellow card) 69'	Box; Report	Milbrett 65' (pen.); Formiga 84'	Stadium: Toyota Park; Attendance: 5,127; Referee: Daniel Fitzgerald

July 19, 2009 16	FC Gold Pride	0–1	Boston Breakers	Santa Clara, California
		Box; Report	Schmedes 14' (Monroe); Fabiana (yellow card) 59'	Stadium: Buck Shaw Stadium; Attendance: 2,203; Referee: Kari Seitz

July 23, 2009 17	FC Gold Pride	0–0	Los Angeles Sol	Santa Clara, California
7:00 p.m. PDT		Box; Report	LeBlanc (yellow card) 79'	Stadium: Buck Shaw Stadium; Attendance: 3,873; Referee: Felisha Mariscal

July 26, 2009 18	Saint Louis Athletica	1–1	FC Gold Pride	Fenton, Missouri
5:00 p.m. CDT	Larsson (yellow card) 21'; Cross 29' (Fletcher)	Box; Report	Buehler (yellow card) 85'; Sinclair 88' (DiMartino)	Stadium: Anheuser-Busch Soccer Park; Attendance: 4,212; Referee: Bryan Roslund

August 1, 2009 19	FC Gold Pride	3–2	Washington Freedom	Santa Clara, California
3:00 p.m. PDT	Yokers 10' (Sinclair); Milbrett 49'; Adriane 84'; Dew (yellow card) 61'	Box; Report	Sawa 18' (Gilbeau), 39'	Stadium: Buck Shaw Stadium; Attendance: 2,324; Referee: Daniel Radford

August 5, 2009 20	Sky Blue FC	2–0	FC Gold Pride	Piscataway, New Jersey
	Rosana 47' (O'Reilly); Kai 62' (McCallum); Buczkowski (yellow card) 69'; Averbuch (yellow card) 71'	Box; Report		Stadium: Yurcak Field; Attendance: 5,455; Referee: Ted Unkel

August 9, 2009 21	FC Gold Pride	1–1	Saint Louis Athletica	Santa Clara, California
	Buehler 25'; Graczyk (yellow card) 90'	Box; Report	Welsh 18' (Solo)	Stadium: Buck Shaw Stadium; Attendance: 3,856; Referee: Daniel Fitzgerald

==== Regular season standings ====
Pos	Team	Pld	W	D	L	GF	GA	GD	Pts	Qualification
1	Los Angeles Sol	20	12	5	3	27	10	+17	41	Advance to Championship
2	Saint Louis Athletica	20	10	4	6	19	15	+4	34	Advance to Super Semifinal
3	Washington Freedom	20	8	5	7	32	32	0	29	Advance to First Round
4	Sky Blue FC	20	7	5	8	19	20	−1	26	Advance to First Round
5	Boston Breakers	20	7	4	9	18	20	−2	25	
6	Chicago Red Stars	20	5	5	10	18	25	−7	20	
7	FC Gold Pride	20	4	6	10	17	28	−11	18	

Source: Soccerway
Rules for classification: Tiebreakers

==== Results summary ====
Overall								Home						Away					
Pld	W	D	L	GF	GA	GD	Pts	W	D	L	GF	GA	GD	W	D	L	GF	GA	GD
20	4	6	10	17	28	−11	18	3	3	4	11	13	−2	1	3	6	6	15	−9

Last updated: August 9, 2009.
Source: 2009 WPS Results

==== Results by matchday ====
Matchday	1	2	3	4	5	6	7	8	9	10	11	12	13	14	15	16	17	18	19	20
Stadium	H	A	A	H	H	A	A	H	A	H	A	A	H	A	H	H	A	H	A	H
Result	W	D	L	L	W	L	W	L	L	D	D	L	L	L	L	D	D	W	L	D

Updated to match(es) played on August 9, 2009. Source: 2009 WPS Results
A = Away; H = Home; W = Win; D = Draw; L = Loss

== Statistics ==
Regular-season player statistics
#	Pos.	Nat.	Name	MP	MS	Min.	G	A	YC	RC
3	DF	(United States) USA	Marisa Abegg	6	3	335	0	0	0	0
21	MF	(Brazil) BRA	Adriane	12	4	451	1	1	0	0
30	FW	(Japan) JPN	Eriko Arakawa	19	11	1,088	1	1	0	0
14	DF	(United States) USA	Greer Barnes	3	3	270	0	0	0	0
1	GK	(United States) USA	Nicole Barnhart	16	16	1,440	0	0	0	0
4	DF	(United States) USA	Rachel Buehler	17	17	1,530	1	1	2	0
6	MF	(United States) USA	Brandi Chastain	10	5	450	0	0	0	0
19	DF	(United States) USA	Carrie Dew	17	17	1,429	1	0	2	1
5	MF	(United States) USA	Tina DiMartino	18	18	1,530	0	1	1	0
20	DF	(Brazil) BRA	Érika	7	5	423	0	0	1	0
31	MF	(Brazil) BRA	Formiga	16	15	1,363	0	0	3	0
13	MF	(United States) USA	Kristen Graczyk	20	18	1,589	0	0	2	0
23	DF	(United States) USA	Lindsay Massengale	4	2	193	0	0	0	0
15	FW	(United States) USA	Tiffeny Milbrett	19	14	1,303	4	1	1	0
10	MF	(United States) USA	Leslie Osborne	19	18	1,622	0	0	1	0
7	DF	(United States) USA	Leigh Ann Robinson	18	15	1,339	1	0	0	0
12	FW	(Canada) CAN	Christine Sinclair	17	16	1,412	6	1	0	0
11	MF	(Brazil) BRA	Sissi	3	1	128	0	0	0	0
8	FW	(United States) USA	Tiffany Weimer	15	10	745	1	3	0	0
18	GK	(United States) USA	Allison Whitworth	4	4	360	0	0	0	0
9	FW	(United States) USA	Kandace Wilson	8	6	555	0	1	0	0
2	MF	(United States) USA	Kimberly Yokers	9	2	238	1	0	0	0
Total							17	10	13	1

== Awards ==
=== WPS All-Star Team ===
2009 WPS All-Star Team selections
Pos.	Nat.	Name	Selected as
DF	(Brazil) BRA	Formiga	Starter (Note: Could not attend due to national-team commitments.)
FW	(Canada) CAN	Christine Sinclair	At-large
FW	(United States) USA	Tiffeny Milbrett	Replacement (Note: As a replacement for Formiga.)
