= Massengale =

Massengale is a surname. Notable people with the surname include:

- Ariel Massengale (born 1993), American basketball player
- Don Massengale (1937-2007), American golfer
- James Massengale, American musicologist
- Lindsay Massengale (born 1976), American soccer player
- Martin Massengale (born 1933), American university president
- Rik Massengale (born 1947), American golfer
