= Rachel Van Hollebeke =

American soccer player (born 1985)

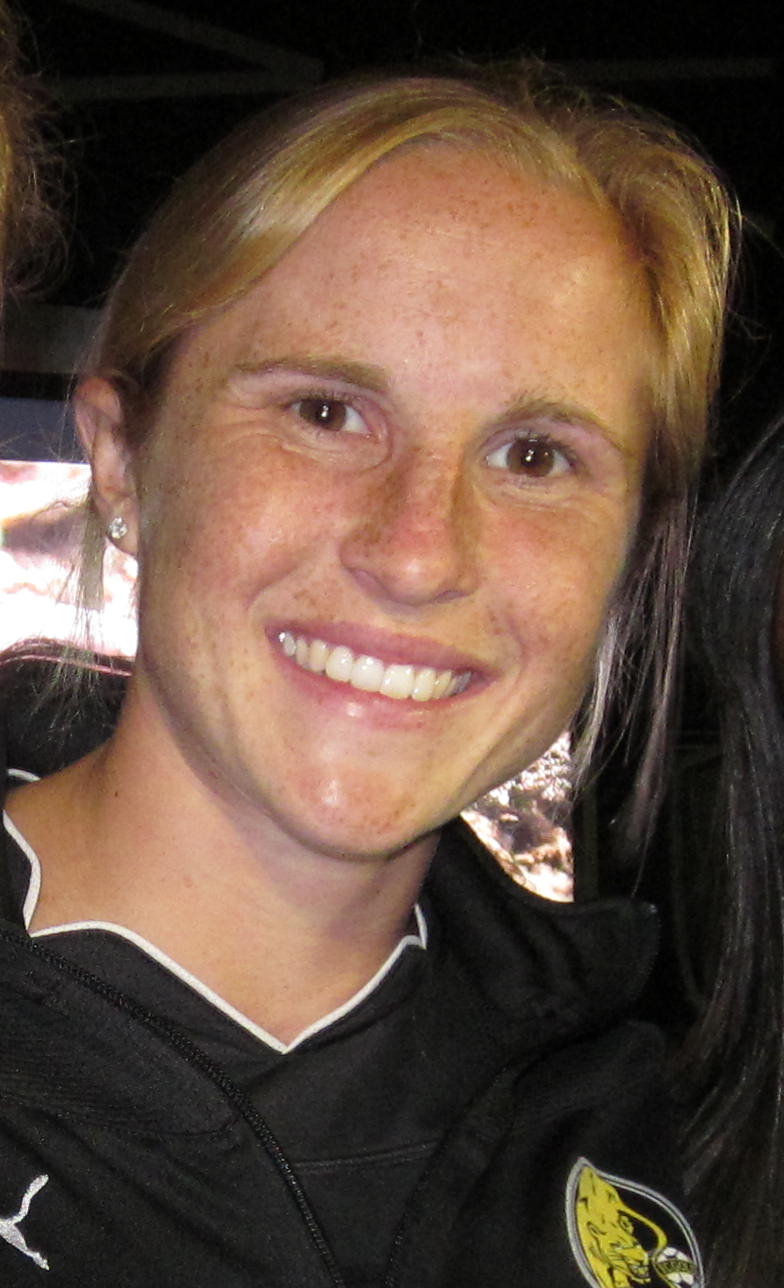
- Rachel with the Gold Pride in September 2010

Personal information
- Full name: Rachel Marie Buehler Van Hollebeke
- Birth name: Rachel Marie Buehler
- Date of birth: August 26, 1985 (age 41)
- Place of birth: Del Mar, California, United States
- Height: 5 ft 5 in (1.65 m)
- Position: Defender

College career
Years	Team	Apps	(Gls)
2003–2007	Stanford Cardinal		

Senior career*
Years	Team	Apps	(Gls)
2006–2008	San Diego WFC SeaLions		
2009–2010	FC Gold Pride	39	(2)
2011	Boston Breakers	10	(1)
2012	Atlanta Beat		
2013–2015	Portland Thorns FC	45	(0)

International career^{‡}
	United States U-19	30	(3)
	United States U-21	17	
- United States U-23
2008–2015	United States	113	(5)
Medal record
Women's football
Representing the United States
Olympic Games
Gold medal – first place	2008 Beijing	Team
Gold medal – first place	2012 London	Team
FIFA Women's World Cup
Silver medal – second place	2011 Germany	Team
- * Club domestic league appearances and goals as of July 23, 2014 ‡ National team caps and goals as of March 10, 2015

Rachel Marie Buehler Van Hollebeke (/ˈhɒləbɛk/ HOL-ə-bek; née Buehler; born August 26, 1985) is an American former soccer player who last played as a defender for the Portland Thorns FC and the United States women's national soccer team. In 2015, Van Hollebeke retired from playing professional soccer, and soon after began attending medical school at UC San Diego School of Medicine.

In 2020, Van Hollebeke joined the ownership group of Angel City FC of the National Women's Soccer League.

== Early life ==
=== Stanford University ===
Van Hollebeke attended Stanford University, where she was named by the NCAA Honors Committee as a recipient of the NCAA Top VIII Award, and completed her senior year in 2007, majoring in human biology/pre-medicine. A three-year captain for the Cardinal, Van Hollebeke was an All-Pac-10 Conference First-Team selection, an NSCAA First-Team All-American Scholar Athlete, and was chosen as the ESPN Academic All-American of the Year. As a redshirt junior in 2006, she was one of two players in the conference to be selected in the All-Pac-10 First Team and the Pac-10 All-Academic First Team.

== Club career ==
=== FC Gold Pride, 2009 ===
On September 16, 2008, Van Hollebeke was one of three members of the 2008 Beijing gold medal team allocated to the brand new Santa Clara, California, club FC Gold Pride, along with Nicole Barnhart and Leslie Osborne. FC Gold Pride, coached by former San Jose Clash midfielder Albertin Montoya, was the seventh and final club named in 2008 to compete in the inaugural season of Women's Professional Soccer (WPS) the following year.

=== Portland Thorns FC, 2013–2015 ===
On January 11, 2013, Van Hollebeke was one of three members from the United States women's national team that was allocated to the new NWSL club Portland Thorns FC, along with Alex Morgan and Tobin Heath.

On August 23, 2015, Van Hollebeke announced her retirement from international and professional soccer at the conclusion of the 2015 National Women's Soccer League season. During her three seasons with Portland Thorns FC, she won the 2013 NWSL Championship, 2013 Portland Thorns FC Defender of the Year, and 2013 NWSL Second XI honors. Additionally, Van Hollebeke played an active role in community events through the club's Stand Together community platform and was named 2014 Community Player of the Year for all of her efforts.

== International career ==
Van Hollebeke has played on several U.S. national youth teams, including U-16 and U-17, and was a member of the first place 2002 FIFA U-19 Women's World Championship in Canada and the third place team at the 2004 FIFA U-19 Women's World Championship in Thailand. She joined the national team training camp in July 2006 and debuted for the full team in March 2008 at the Algarve Cup in Portugal. Van Hollebeke was named to the 2008 U.S. Olympic women's soccer team on June 23, 2008. She appeared in two matches, chipping in with one assist. She was also chosen for the 2011 FIFA Women's World Cup squad and scored on the USA's opening game against North Korea. Van Hollebeke was part of the team that won the gold medal at the 2012 London Olympics. Van Hollebeke appeared in all six matches and played all but 35 minutes of the United States gold medal campaign.

On March 6, 2013, in the opening game of the Algarve Cup, Van Hollebeke became only the 29th female to play 100 times for the United States. Van Hollebeke's very first appearance with the national team was in 2008 at the very same tournament. During her 100th cap against Iceland, Van Hollebeke scored a goal, making her only the 4th U.S. woman next to Tiffeny Milbrett, Shannon MacMillan, and Abby Wambach to score in their 100th appearance.

Rachel Van Hollebeke scored 5 goals in international competition; one each in World Cup final tournament, Olympic qualification, World Cup qualification, the Algarve Cup, and a friendly match.

== Personal life ==
Rachel married Bobby Van Hollebeke on November 17, 2012, at Balboa Park in San Diego. She announced that she would be using her husband's last name professionally from 2014 on.

Van Hollebeke's maiden name and tough playing style earned her the nickname "The Buehldozer".

Van Hollebeke prepared for medical school while still an active player, with fellow players helping her study for entrance exams. She retired from soccer at the end of the 2015 NWSL season and began medical school at the University of California, San Diego School of Medicine the next day. She graduated as an M.D. in 2019 and now practices medicine in the San Diego area.

In 2020, Van Hollebeke joined the ownership group of NWSL team Angel City FC. The owners, led by venture capitalists and entrepreneurs, include former teammates from the USWNT as well as some Hollywood stars.

== Career statistics ==
=== Club ===
Club	Season	League			Playoffs (Note: Includes WPS playoffs and NWSL Playoffs)		Total	
Club	Season	Division	Apps	Goals	Apps	Goals	Apps	Goals
FC Gold Pride	2009	WPS	17	1	—		17	1
FC Gold Pride	2010	WPS	22	1	1	0	23	1
Boston Breakers	2011	WPS	10	1	1	0	11	1
Portland Thorns FC	2013	NWSL	20	0	2	0	22	0
Portland Thorns FC	2014	NWSL	12	0	1	0	13	0
Portland Thorns FC	2015	NWSL	13	0	—		13	0
Career total			94	3	5	0	99	3

=== International ===
Appearances and goals by national team and year
National team	Year	Apps	Goals
United States	2008	23	0
United States	2009	8	0
United States	2010	17	1
United States	2011	19	1
United States	2012	31	1
United States	2013	10	2
United States	2014	4	0
United States	2015	1	0
Total		113	5

Scores and results list United States goal tally first, score column indicates score after each Van Hollebeke goal.

List of international goals scored by Rachel Van Hollebeke
No.	Date	Venue	Opponent	Score	Result	Competition	Ref.
1	October 28, 2010	Cancún, Mexico	Haiti	1–0	5–0	2010 CONCACAF Women's World Cup Qualifying	
2	June 28, 2011	Dresden, Germany	North Korea	2–0	2–0	2011 FIFA Women's World Cup	
3	January 20, 2012	Vancouver, Canada	Dominican Republic	3–0	14–0	2012 CONCACAF Women's Olympic Qualifying Tournament	
4	March 6, 2013	Albufeira, Portugal	Iceland	1–0	3–0	2013 Algarve Cup	
5	September 3, 2013	Washington, D.C.	Mexico	6–0	7–0	Friendly	

== Honors ==
FC Gold Pride

- WPS Championship: 2010

Portland Thorns FC

- NWSL Championship: 2013

United States

- Olympic Gold Medal: 2008, 2012

Individual

- NWSL Second XI: 2013

== See also ==
- List of footballers with 100 or more caps
- List of Olympic medalists in football
- All-time FC Gold Pride roster
