= Jennifer Nobis =

American soccer player

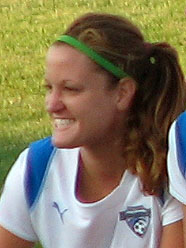

Personal information
- Full name: Jennifer Anne Nobis
- Date of birth: March 22, 1984 (age 42)
- Place of birth: Quincy, Illinois, United States
- Height: 5 ft 7 in (1.70 m)
- Position: Forward

College career
Years	Team	Apps	(Gls)
2002–2005	Missouri Tigers		

Senior career*
Years	Team	Apps	(Gls)
2006–2007	River Cities Futbol Club		
2006	Charlton Athletic L.F.C.		
2007	Danmarks IF Uppsala	10	(9)
2008	Umeå Södra FF	18	(3)
2009–	Boston Breakers	11	(2)
2009	→ Piteå IF (loan)	4	(2)
- * Club domestic league appearances and goals

Jennifer Anne Nobis (born March 22, 1984) is an American soccer forward playing until 2012 for Piteå IF of the Swedish Damallsvenskan.

== Playing career ==
=== Early life and university ===
Played for four Missouri state champion club teams as a member of the Wolfpack (1998) and Busch (2000–02) soccer clubs. Nobis attended Quincy High School. She led Quincy to three consecutive regional championships from 2000 to 2002 and finished as the schools all-time scoring leader with 107 career goals and 50 career assists.

She was recruited to and eventually enrolled at the University of Missouri. While at university, she was a student-athlete and played for the Missouri Tigers women's soccer team from 2002 through 2005. She was selected to the All-Big 12 Second Team as a Junior in 2004. She set a school record with 14 assists as a senior in 2005, and her 0.78 assists per game averaged in 2005 ranks fourth all-time in the Big 12. For her career, Nobis ranks second all-time on Missouri's career list in goals (32) and third in both points (93) and assists (28).

=== Professional career ===
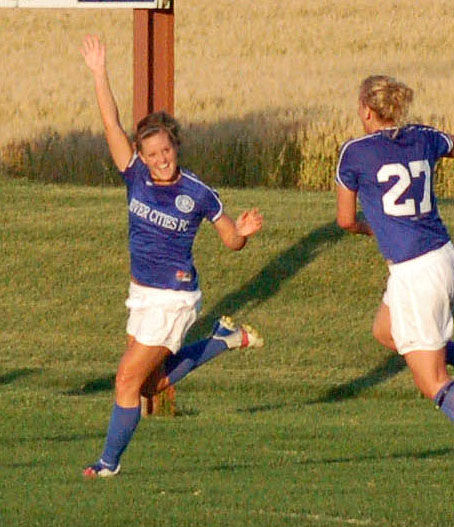
Nobis celebrates a goal for the River Cities FC, 2006.

In her first of two seasons (2006–2007) with the River Cities Futbol Club, Nobis was named 2006 WPSL Player of the Year and led the WPSL in scoring and total points. She scored 10 goals in 8 matches.

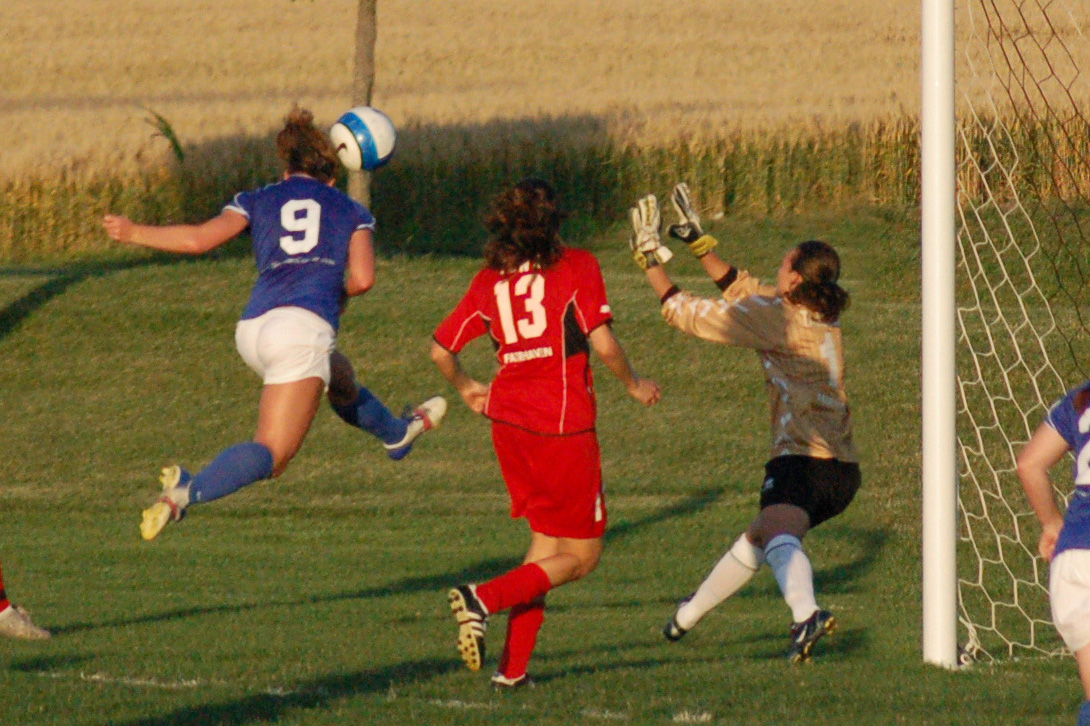
Nobis flies through the air for the River Cities FC, 2006.

Nobis played in England in 2006 for Charlton Athletic L.F.C. and in Sweden from 2007 through 2008. Her first season in Sweden was spent with Danmarks IF Uppsala, where she appeared in 10 games and scored nine goals. The following season she joined Umeå Södra FF in the Damallsvenskan. There she notched three goals and three assists in 18 matches.

Upon the return of top-flight professional soccer to the United States, Nobis decided to return home. She was the 29th overall selection in the 2009 WPS Draft and her playing rights were assigned to Boston Breakers. In the inaugural 2009 Women's Professional Soccer season, Nobis played in 11 matches and scored 2 goals.

After the conclusion of the Women's Professional Soccer season, Nobis went on loan to Piteå IF. Her first appearance for the team was on September 27, 2009 and she scored on her debut.

Jennifer continued playing successfully for the Piteå IF ladies team in the Swedish Damallsvenskan (Premier league), one of the top contenders in the league, and retired from professional sports at the end of their 2012 season.
