= Ashley Bowyer =

American soccer player (born 1988)

Personal information
- Full name: Ashley Anne Schaus
- Birth name: Ashley Anne Bowyer
- Date of birth: June 8, 1988 (age 38)
- Place of birth: Aliso Viejo, California, United States
- Height: 5 ft 8 in (1.73 m)
- Position: Midfielder

Team information
- Current team: Pali Blues
- Number: 15

Youth career
- Slammers FC
- 2002–2006: Aliso Niguel High School

College career
Years	Team	Apps	(Gls)
2006–2009	Ohio State Buckeyes		

Senior career*
Years	Team	Apps	(Gls)
2009	Ohio Premier Women's SC		
2010	FC Gold Pride	0	(0)
2011–	Pali Blues	7	(0)

International career
2009–2010	United States U-23		
- * Club domestic league appearances and goals

Ashley Anne Schaus (née Bowyer; born June 8, 1988) is an American soccer player from Aliso Viejo, California. She is a midfielder for the Women's Professional Soccer club FC Gold Pride and the United States U-23 women's national soccer team.

== Career ==
=== Professional career ===
Bowyer, an NSCAA All-American at Ohio State University, was selected by FC Gold Pride in the fifth round of the 2010 WPS Draft.

== Personal life ==
Bowyer is a native of Aliso Viejo, California.
