= Allison Whitworth =

American soccer player & coach (born 1985)

Personal information
- Full name: Allison Leigh Whitworth
- Date of birth: December 11, 1985 (age 40)
- Place of birth: Birmingham, Alabama, United States
- Height: 5 ft 9 in (1.75 m)
- Position: Goalkeeper

College career
Years	Team	Apps	(Gls)
2004–2008	Auburn Tigers	73	

Senior career*
Years	Team	Apps	(Gls)
2008	Atlanta Silverbacks	8	(0)
2009	FC Gold Pride	4	(0)
2010	Atlanta Beat	3	(0)
2010	Chicago Red Stars	1	(0)
2011	Atlanta Beat	11	(0)

Managerial career
- 2011–2012: Middle Tennessee Blue Raiders (assistant)
- 2013–2015: Ohio Bobcats (goalkeeping)
- 2016–2018: Spring Hill Badgers
- 2019: Mississippi State Bulldogs (goalkeeping)
- * Club domestic league appearances and goals

Allison Leigh Whitworth (born December 11, 1985) is an American former professional soccer player and coach who played as a goalkeeper. Whitworth most recently served as assistant coach for the Mississippi State Bulldogs women's soccer team.

Whitworth is a teaching faculty member at the University of Tennessee, where she instructs courses in Strategy, Leadership, and Human Resource Management. Her academic work focuses on the intersection of organizational strategy, people development, and leadership effectiveness, with a strong emphasis on experiential learning and student engagement.

Before entering academia, Whitworth enjoyed a distinguished career in professional soccer, competing in the Women’s Professional Soccer (WPS) league as a goalkeeper for FC Gold Pride, the Atlanta Beat, and the Chicago Red Stars—serving as an adidas-sponsored athlete throughout her career. She later transitioned into coaching, working at the collegiate level before moving into youth development, where she currently coaches competitive teams and directs specialized goalkeeper training programs.

== Playing career ==
=== College career ===
She capped her Tiger career by setting a school record with 356 saves, including an Southeastern Conference-high of 132 during her senior campaign which still remains an Auburn record. The 356 saves place her third in the SEC league record book. She registered 22 career shutouts, including eight during each of her junior and senior years, tied for eighth in SEC history. She received First Team All-SEC honors thanks in part to her 1.02 goals-against average. This was her second league accolade after picking up a Second Team award the previous season. Whitworth was chosen as a SEC Defensive Player of the Week at least once in each of her last three seasons, culminating with winning the award three times as a senior. She saw action in 73 career matches, posting a 1.13 career goals-against average. In her senior season she received recognition for her academic and athletic success in the SEC Scholar Athlete of the Year. Following her senior season, Whitworth was awarded a first team All-Region Scholar and Scholar All-American second team by United Soccer Coaches (formerly NSCAA). After graduating, she became the first Auburn alumni to be drafted into a professional soccer league.

=== Club career ===
Whitworth's first season of club soccer came in 2008 at the amateur level with the Atlanta Silverbacks in the USL W-League. She amassed a perfect 8–0–0 record with Atlanta during the 2008 USL W-League season, helping propel them to a perfect 13–0–0 record and a playoff berth.

Whitworth was drafted FC Gold Pride after being drafted in the 8th round of the 2009 Women's Professional Soccer Draft ahead of the league and team's inaugural season. She served as backup to United States Women's National Team player Nicole Barnhart during the 2009 WPS season. Her first start came on May 24 in a loss to LA Sol. Whitworth saw an improved result when she faced LA Sol next, earning shutout on July 23. Whitworth earned the first win of her professional career against the Washington Freedom on August 1. Over the season she appeared in four matches, allowing five goals and keeping one clean sheet.

Following the 2009 season she was traded on October 29, 2009, sent along with the 23rd pick in the 2010 WPS Draft to the Atlanta Beat for the 10th and 12th picks in the same draft. This trade saw Whitworth return to play soccer in Atlanta just a couple years after featuring for the W-League's Silverbacks.

In 2010 she started three games for the Atlanta Beat, making 22 saves on 29 shots (76% save percentage). On June 18, 2010, Whitworth was traded to the Chicago Red Stars after Chicago's Kelsey Davis suffered a season-ending injury. She started one game for Chicago, on July 10, making two saves to earn a shut out for the Red Stars against the defending WPS champions Sky Blue FC.

In 2011 Whitworth returned to the Atlanta Beat by the Red Stars, and started eleven matches for the Beat in what was ultimately the final WPS season as well as the final for the Beat as a club. She was nominated for goalkeeper of the year following the conclusion of the regular season. She remains the only goalkeeper in the WPS to have recorded a shutout for three or more teams.

== Coaching career ==
Whitworth began her coaching career at Middle Tennessee State University where she was an assistant for two seasons in 2011 and 2012. The Blue Raiders went 24–14–1 and recorded 14 shutouts along with claiming a 2012 Sun Belt Conference regular-season championship. Whitworth spent the next 3 years as the goalkeeper coach and recruit coordinator at Ohio University for the Bobcats women's soccer program. Her experience as a Head Coach came at Spring Hill College spanning the 2016, 2017, and 2018 seasons. She amassed a record of 2 wins, 46 losses and 4 draws. After leaving Spring Hill, Whitworth joined Mississippi State University in 2019 to train the goalkeepers. Whitworth joined the Jamaican national team to coach goalkeepers for a training event with international friendlies vs Costa Rica in Fall of 2021.

== Career statistics ==
=== Coaching Statistics ===
Team	Season	Regular season					Conference Play				
Team	Season	Wins	Losses	Draws	Goals For	Goals Against	Wins	Losses	Draws	Goals For	Goals Against
Spring Hill College	2016	0	15	3	11	61	0	10	3	4	40
Spring Hill College	2017	1	17	0	8	69	0	14	0	7	48
Spring Hill College	2018	1	14	1	10	61	1	11	1	6	43
	Total	2	46	4	29	191	1	35	4	17	131

=== Club statistics ===
Team	Season	League	Domestic League					Domestic Playoffs					Total				
Team	Season	League	Apps	Starts	Minutes	Goals	Assists	Apps	Starts	Minutes	Goals	Assists	Apps	Starts	Minutes	Goals	Assists
Atlanta Silverbacks	2008	W-League	8	8	720	0	0						8	8	720	0	0
		Total	8	8	720	0	0						8	8	720	0	0
FC Gold Pride	2009	WPS	4	4	360	0	0	–	–	–	–	–	4	4	360	0	0
Atlanta Beat	2010	WPS	6	6													
Chicago Red Stars	2010	WPS	1	1													
Atlanta Beat	2011	WPS	12	12													
		Total	4	4	360	0	0	–	–	–	–	–	4	4	360	0	0
Career Total		–	12	12	1080	0	0	0	0	0	0	0	12	12	1080	0	0

== Education and Academics ==
Whitworth completed undergraduate degree at Auburn University in Psychology, summa cum laude, with a minor in exercise science and finance. While continuing her college soccer career at Auburn she completed a Masters in Kinesiology. Transitioning to a business focus she achieved a in a Master of Sports Business Administration from Ohio University, before competing her formal education at University of North Alabama with a Executive Doctor of Business Administration.

Whitworth holds several soccer credentials and diplomas including Advanced National Diploma and Advanced National Goalkeeping Diploma (United Soccer Coaches), as well as the US Soccer Federation D License, C License, and B License.
