= Kimberly Yokers =

American professional soccer midfielder (born 1982)

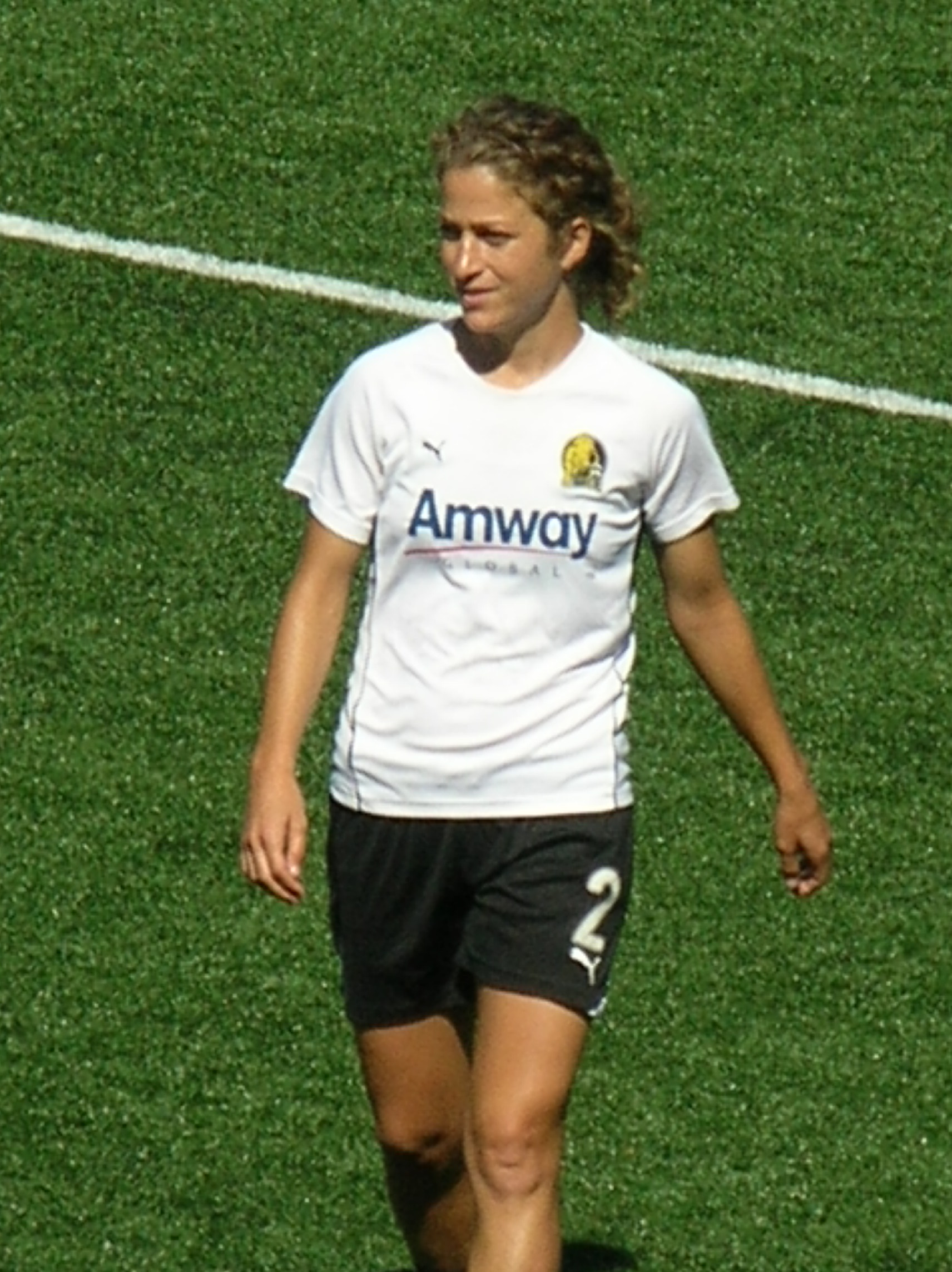
- Yokers at the 2010 WPS Championship

Personal information
- Full name: Kimberly R. Yokers
- Date of birth: May 24, 1982 (age 44)
- Place of birth: Seattle, WA, United States
- Height: 5 ft 6 in (1.68 m)
- Position: Midfielder

College career
Years	Team	Apps	(Gls)
2000–2003	California Golden Bears		

Senior career*
Years	Team	Apps	(Gls)
2004–2008	California Storm		
2009–2010	FC Gold Pride	9	(1)
2012	New York Fury		
2013	Western New York Flash	3	(0)

International career^{‡}
- United States U-21
- * Club domestic league appearances and goals as of July 25, 2009 ‡ National team caps and goals as of July 25, 2009

Kimberly R. Yokers (born May 24, 1982) is an American professional soccer midfielder. She played for Western New York Flash of the NWSL, for FC Gold Pride of the WPS, and was a former member of the United States U-21 women's national soccer team.

== Early life ==
Born in Seattle, Washington, Yokers attended Mt. Rainier High School in Des Moines, Washington where she was a three-time all-league honoree. She was a two-time selection to the Valley News all-area team and a two-time team MVP helping lead her high school team to second in the state in 1999 and third in 1997. She also played for club team, the Highline Eagles, and won the Washington State Cup five times.

=== College career ===
Yokers attended Cal Berkeley where she played as a central midfielder for the Cal Bears. In 2000, she started 20 of the 21 games she played in tallying eight points to lead all freshmen on the team. She scored three goals, served two assists, and was selected to the Bay Area Classic all-tournament team. During her second year, she made 20 starts for the Bears and finished tied for fourth with 12 points (including three goals and six assists). Her six assists were second-most on the team. She was selected as second team All-Pac-10 and third team All-West region by the NSCAA and Soccer Buzz the same year. She was also named honorable mention Academic All-Pac-10.

== Club career ==
=== California Storm ===
From 2004 to 2008, Yokers played for the California Storm in the WPSL. In 2004, she made two appearances for the team. In 2007, she made nine appearances. In 2008, she scored three goals during her 14 appearances with the team.

=== FC Gold Pride ===
Yokers played for the FC Gold Pride in the WPS from 2009 to 2010. During the 2009 season, she made nine appearances and scored one goal.

During the 2010 season, she made five appearances for a total of 167 minutes. The team ceased operations mid-season.

=== New York Fury ===
After the WPS suspended operations in early 2012, Yokers signed with the New York Fury in the WPSL Elite.

=== Western New York Flash ===
In 2013, Yokers signed with the Western New York Flash for the inaugural season of the NWSL.

She was released by the Flash in June 2013 for medical reasons.

== International career ==
Yokers represented the United States as a member of the U-21 team that competed at the 2001 Nordic Cup in Finland.
