= 2009 Women's Professional Soccer season =

American women's professional soccer league

Women's Professional Soccer
- Season: 2009
- Champions: Sky Blue FC
- Goals: 153
- Average goals/game: 2.10
- Top goalscorer: Marta (10)
- Longest winning run: 4 (LA rounds 13–16)
- Longest unbeaten run: 11 (LA rounds 6–16)
- Longest losing run: 4 (BAY rounds 12–15)
- Highest attendance: 16,089 (WAS v NJ)
- Lowest attendance: 1,878 (NJ v BOS)
- Average attendance: 4,684

The 2009 Women's Professional Soccer season served as the inaugural season for WPS, the top level professional women's soccer league in the United States. The regular season began on March 29 and ended on August 9, with the postseason being held between August 15 and 21.

== Competition format ==
- The season began on March 29 and ended on August 9.
- Each team played a total of 20 games evenly divided between home and away games. Each team played every other team three times, either twice at home and once away or once at home and twice away, for a total of 18 games. The remaining two games were played against two other teams, one at home and one away.
- The four teams with the most points from the regular season qualified for the playoffs. The third- and fourth-placed regular season finishers played each other in the single-match First Round. The winner of the First Round then faced the second-placed regular season finisher in the Super Semifinal, and the winner faced the first-placed regular season finisher in the WPS Final.

=== Results table ===
Abbreviation and Color Key: Boston Breakers – BOS • Chicago Red Stars – CHI • FC Gold Pride – BAY • Los Angeles Sol – LA Saint Louis Athletica – STL • Sky Blue FC – NJ • Washington Freedom – WSH Win • Loss • Tie • Home
Club	Match																			
Club	1	2	3	4	5	6	7	8	9	10	11	12	13	14	15	16	17	18	19	20
Boston Breakers	BAY	STL	WSH	CHI	LA	LA	WSH	NJ	STL	BAY	CHI	WSH	NJ	NJ	CHI	BAY	NJ	WSH	STL	LA
Boston Breakers	2–1	2–0	1–3	4–0	2–1	0–0	1–1	2–1	0–1	1–1	0–2	1–0	1–0	1–2	1–0	0–1	0–0	0–1	0–1	2–1
Chicago Red Stars	STL	WSH	NJ	BOS	NJ	BAY	STL	LA	BAY	WSH	NJ	BOS	LA	WSH	BAY	BOS	NJ	WSH	LA	STL
Chicago Red Stars	0–1	1–1	0–0	4–0	0–2	0–1	0–2	1–1	1–1	0–0	1–0	0–2	4–0	2–1	3–1	1–0	1–0	2–3	3–1	2–0
FC Gold Pride	BOS	NJ	LA	WSH	NJ	STL	CHI	LA	WSH	CHI	BOS	LA	STL	CHI	BOS	LA	STL	WSH	NJ	STL
FC Gold Pride	2–1	1–1	1–0	3–4	1–0	1–0	0–1	0–2	3–1	1–1	1–1	2–0	0–1	3–1	0–1	0–0	1–1	2–3	2–0	1–1
Los Angeles Sol	WSH	NJ	BAY	STL	BOS	BOS	NJ	BAY	STL	CHI	WSH	NJ	BAY	STL	CHI	WSH	STL	BAY	CHI	BOS
Los Angeles Sol	2–0	0–2	1–0	0–0	2–1	0–0	1–0	0–2	2–0	1–1	3–1	0–0	2–0	1–2	4–0	0–1	0–1	0–0	3–1	2–1
Saint Louis Athletica	CHI	BOS	LA	WSH	BAY	CHI	LA	NJ	BOS	WSH	LA	NJ	BAY	LA	WSH	NJ	BAY	BOS	CHI	BAY
Saint Louis Athletica	0–1	2–0	0–0	3–3	1–0	0–2	2–0	1–0	0–1	0–1	1–2	1–2	0–1	0–1	1–0	1–0	1–1	1–0	2–0	1–1
Sky Blue FC	LA	BAY	CHI	BAY	CHI	LA	WSH	BOS	STL	LA	CHI	STL	BOS	BOS	WSH	CHI	STL	BOS	BAY	WSH
Sky Blue FC	0–2	1–1	0–0	1–0	0–2	1–0	2–1	2–1	1–0	0–0	1–0	1–2	1–0	1–2	4–4	1–0	1–0	0–0	2–0	3–1
Washington Freedom	LA	CHI	BOS	BAY	STL	BOS	NJ	BAY	LA	CHI	STL	BOS	CHI	LA	NJ	STL	CHI	BOS	BAY	NJ
Washington Freedom	2–0	1–1	1–3	3–4	3–3	1–1	2–1	3–1	3–1	0–0	0–1	1–0	2–1	0–1	4–4	1–0	2–3	1–0	3–2	3–1

== Standings ==
Pos	Team	Pld	W	D	L	GF	GA	GD	Pts	Qualification
1	Los Angeles Sol	20	12	5	3	27	10	+17	41	Advance to Championship
2	Saint Louis Athletica	20	10	4	6	19	15	+4	34	Advance to Super Semifinal
3	Washington Freedom	20	8	5	7	32	32	0	29	Advance to First Round
4	Sky Blue FC	20	7	5	8	19	20	−1	26	Advance to First Round
5	Boston Breakers	20	7	4	9	18	20	−2	25	
6	Chicago Red Stars	20	5	5	10	18	25	−7	20	
7	FC Gold Pride	20	4	6	10	17	28	−11	18	

Source: Soccerway
Rules for classification: Tiebreakers

== Attendance ==
=== Average home attendances ===
Ranked from highest to lowest average attendance.

Team	GP	Attendance	Average
Los Angeles Sol	10	62,980	6,298
Washington Freedom	10	57,466	5,747
Chicago Red Stars	10	49,276	4,928
Boston Breakers	10	46,651	4,665
Saint Louis Athletica	10	38,326	3,833
FC Gold Pride	10	36,666	3,667
Sky Blue FC	10	36,513	3,651
Total	70	327,878	4,684

== Playoffs ==
First Round
3	Washington Freedom	1
4	Sky Blue FC	2

Super Semifinal
2	Saint Louis Athletica	0
4	Sky Blue FC	1

WPS Final
1	Los Angeles Sol	0
4	Sky Blue FC	1

== Leaders ==
Last updated: August 4, 2009

=== Offense ===
Leading Goalscorers
Rank	Player	Club	G	Min
1	(Brazil) Marta	Los Angeles Sol	9	1440
2	(France) Camille Abily	Los Angeles Sol	8	1314
3	(Brazil) Cristiane	Chicago Red Stars	6	920
4	(United States) Abby Wambach	Washington Freedom	6	977
4	(Canada) Christine Sinclair	FC Gold Pride	6	1052
4	(England) Eniola Aluko	Saint Louis Athletica	6	1123
7	(Australia) Lisa De Vanna	Washington Freedom	5	629
7	(United States) Natasha Kai	Sky Blue FC	5	954
7	(England) Kelly Smith	Boston Breakers	5	974
10	(France) Sonia Bompastor	Washington Freedom	4	793
10	(United States) Tiffany Milbrett	FC Gold Pride	4	
10	(United States) Lindsay Tarpley	Chicago Red Stars	4	

Assist Leaders
Rank	Player	Club	A	Min
1	(France) Sonia Bompastor	Washington Freedom	6	1170
1	(Japan) Aya Miyama	Los Angeles Sol	6	1620
3	(England) Eniola Aluko	Saint Louis Athletica	4	1123
3	(Australia) Lisa De Vanna	Washington Freedom	4	767
5	(United States) Keeley Dowling	Sky Blue FC	3	529
5	(United States) Kendall Fletcher	Saint Louis Athletica	3	695
5	(Brazil) Marta	Los Angeles Sol	3	1440
5	(United States) Megan Rapinoe	Chicago Red Stars	3	1096
5	(United States) Lindsay Tarpley	Chicago Red Stars	3	1117
5	(United States) Aly Wagner	Los Angeles Sol	3	695
5	(United States) Abby Wambach	Washington Freedom	3	977
5	(United States) Tiffany Weimer	FC Gold Pride	3	644

Most Shots
Rank	Player	Club	Shts	Min
1	(United States) Abby Wambach	Washington Freedom	64	977
2	(Canada) Christine Sinclair	FC Gold Pride	52	1052
3	(Brazil) Marta	Los Angeles Sol	51	1440
4	(England) Eniola Aluko	Saint Louis Athletica	49	1123
5	(United States) Megan Rapinoe	Chicago Red Stars	45	1096
5	(United States) Kristine Lilly	Boston Breakers	45	1260
7	(United States) Natasha Kai	Sky Blue FC	42	974
7	(Japan) Aya Miyama	Los Angeles Sol	42	1620
9	(Brazil) Cristiane	Chicago Red Stars	41	920
9	(Australia) Lisa De Vanna	Washington Freedom	41	920
9	(England) Kelly Smith	Boston Breakers	41	974
9	(United States) Lindsay Tarpley	Chicago Red Stars	41	

Most Crosses
Rank	Player	Club	Crs	Min
1	(England) Karen Carney	Chicago Red Stars	51	1201
2	(Brazil) Marta	Los Angeles Sol	36	1440
3	(United States) Megan Rapinoe	Chicago Red Stars	34	1096
4	(Japan) Aya Miyama	Los Angeles Sol	33	1530
5	(France) Sonia Bompastor	Washington Freedom	30	1170
6	(United States) Kristine Lilly	Boston Breakers	25	1260
7	(England) Eniola Aluko	Saint Louis Athletica	24	1123
8	(United States) Amy Rodriguez	Boston Breakers	21	920
8	(United States) Heather O'Reilly	Sky Blue FC	21	1170
8	(United States) Heather Mitts	Boston Breakers	21	1203

=== Fouls ===
Fouls Committed
Rank	Player	Club	FC	Min
1	(United States) Megan Rapinoe	Chicago Red Stars	35	1096
2	(United States) Carli Lloyd	Chicago Red Stars	33	953
3	(England) Kelly Smith	Boston Breakers	30	974
3	(United States) Abby Wambach	Washington Freedom	30	977
3	(United States) Shannon Boxx	Los Angeles Sol	30	1440
6	(Brazil) Formiga	FC Gold Pride	27	1093
6	(France) Sonia Bompastor	Washington Freedom	27	1170
8	(Brazil) Rosana	Sky Blue FC	23	
9	(United States) Brittany Klein	Chicago Red Stars	22	1228
9	(Brazil) Marta	Los Angeles Sol	22	1440

Fouls Suffered
Rank	Player	Club	FS	Min
1	(United States) Lori Chalupny	Saint Louis Athletica	44	1170
2	(England) Kelly Smith	Boston Breakers	43	974
3	(United States) Abby Wambach	Washington Freedom	38	977
3	(France) Sonia Bompastor	Washington Freedom	38	1170
5	(United States) Kristine Lilly	Boston Breakers	32	1260
6	(United States) Brittany Klein	Chicago Red Stars	26	1228
6	(Brazil) Marta	Los Angeles Sol	26	1440
6	(Japan) Aya Miyama	Los Angeles Sol	26	1530
9	(Brazil) Formiga	FC Gold Pride	25	1093
10	(United States) Tina DiMartino	FC Gold Pride	20	
10	(United States) Leslie Osborne	FC Gold Pride	20	1217

=== Goalkeeping ===
270+ MINS only

Rank	Goalkeeper	Club	GP	MINS	SOG	SVS	GA	GAA	W-L-T	SHO
1	(United States) Jillian Loyden	Saint Louis Athletica	3	270	18	16	1	0.33	2–1–0	2
2	(Canada) Karina LeBlanc	Los Angeles Sol	18	1620	87	73	9	0.50	10–3–5	12
3	(United States) Ali Lipsher	Boston Breakers	11	928	46	37	6	0.58	4–4–2	5
4	(United States) Hope Solo	Saint Louis Athletica	15	1350	86	71	13	0.87	7–5–3	7
5	(United States) Jenni Branam	Sky Blue FC	16	1395	82	62	15	0.97	6–6–3	6
6	(Sweden) Caroline Jönsson	Chicago Red Stars	19	1710	109	87	23	1.21	5–9–5	4
7	(United States) Alison Whitworth	FC Gold Pride	4	360	22	17	5	1.25	1–2–1	1
8	(United States) Kristin Luckenbill	Boston Breakers	9	782	41	24	12	1.38	3–4–2	2
9	(United States) Nicole Barnhart	FC Gold Pride	12	1260	83	61	20	1.43	3–7–4	2
10	(Canada) Erin McLeod	Washington Freedom	13	1170	69	46	19	1.46	5–5–3	3
11	(United States) Briana Scurry	Washington Freedom	3	270	17	11	6	2.00	0–2–1	0

== Awards ==
=== Player of the Week ===
Week	Player of the Week	Club	Week's Statline
Week 1	(Japan) Aya Miyama	Los Angeles Sol	1 A (6') GWA
Week 2	(Brazil) Marta	Los Angeles Sol	2 G (42', 45') GWG
Week 3	(England) Kelly Smith	Boston Breakers	1 G (53') GWG, 1 A (87')
Week 4	(United States) Aly Wagner	Los Angeles Sol	1 A (47') GWA
Week 5	(United States) Abby Wambach	Washington Freedom	2 G (18', 90') GWG, 1 A (51')
Week 6	(France) Sonia Bompastor	Washington Freedom	2 G (29', 90')
Week 7	(United States) Lori Chalupny	Saint Louis Athletica	1 G (16') GWG
Week 8	(Canada) Christine Sinclair	FC Gold Pride	1 G (30') GWG
Week 9	(United States) Jillian Loyden	Saint Louis Athletica	6 SVS, SHO
Week 10	(United States) Shannon Boxx	Los Angeles Sol	1 G (50')
Week 11	(France) Camille Abily	Los Angeles Sol	1 G (90'), 2 G (14', 60')
Week 12	(England) Eniola Aluko	Saint Louis Athletica	1 G (43') GWG
Week 13	(Canada) Erin McLeod	Washington Freedom	7 SVS, SHO
Week 14	(Brazil) Marta	Los Angeles Sol	1 G (73') GWG, 2 G (62', 92')
Week 15	(United States) Lindsay Tarpley	Chicago Red Stars	1 A (48'), 1 G (61') GWG
Week 16	(Brazil) Cristiane	Chicago Red Stars	3 G (31', 46+', 65') GWG
Week 17	(United States) Natasha Kai	Sky Blue FC	2 G (5', 86'); 6 shots
Week 18	(United States) Abby Wambach	Washington Freedom	2 G (35', 56')
Week 19	(United States) Lindsay Tarpley	Chicago Red Stars	1 A (24'), 1 G (47') GWG
Week 20	(United States) Abby Wambach	Washington Freedom	1 A (58'), 2 G (20', 49')

=== Player of the Month ===
Month	Player of the Month	Club	Month's Statline
April	(England) Kelly Smith	Boston Breakers	3 G, 1 A in 3 games; Breakers 2–2–0 in April
May	(France) Sonia Bompastor	Washington Freedom	2 G, 3 A in 4 games; Freedom 2–0–2 in May
June	(France) Camille Abily	Los Angeles Sol	5 G in 6 games; Sol 4–0–2 in June
July	(United States) Abby Wambach	Washington Freedom	4 G, 1 A in 5 games; Freedom 3–2–1 in July

== Statistics ==
=== Scoring ===
- First Goal of the Season: Allison Falk for Los Angeles Sol against Washington Freedom, 6th minute (March 29)
- Earliest Goal in a Match: 2 minutes
  - Kelly Smith for Boston Breakers against Los Angeles Sol (2 May)
  - Eniola Aluko for Saint Louis Athletica against Sky Blue FC (June 28)
- Latest Goal in a Match: 93+ minutes
  - Jennifer Nobis for Boston Breakers against Sky Blue FC (July 12)
- Widest Winning Margin: 4 goals
  - Chicago Red Stars 4–0 Boston Breakers (April 25)
  - Los Angeles Sol 4–0 Chicago Red Stars (June 27)
- Most Goals Scored in a Match: 8
  - Sky Blue FC 4–4 Washington Freedom (April 26)
- First Hat-Trick: Cristiane for Chicago Red Stars against FC Gold Pride (July 12))
- Fastest Hat-Trick: 35 minutes
  - Cristiane for Chicago Red Stars against FC Gold Pride: 31' 46+' 65' (July 12)
- First Own Goal: Ifeoma Dieke of Chicago Red Stars for Saint Louis Athletica (23 May)
- Average Goals per match: 2.086

=== Discipline ===
- First Yellow Card: Nikki Krzysik for Chicago Red Stars against Saint Louis Athletica, 90th minute (April 4)
- First Red Card: Frida Östberg for Chicago Red Stars against Washington Freedom, 63rd minute (April 11)
- Most Yellow Cards: 4
  - Chioma Igwe (Chicago Red Stars)
  - Kia McNeill (Saint Louis Athletica)
- Most Yellow Cards in a Match: 4
  - Boston Breakers 2–0 Saint Louis Athletica – 3 for Boston (Kasey Moore, Alex Scott, & Stacy Bishop) and 1 for St. Louis (Melissa Tancredi) (April 11)
  - Saint Louis Athletica 0–0 Los Angeles Sol – 2 for St. Louis (Kia McNeill & Daniela) and 2 for Los Angeles (Aya Miyama & Shannon Boxx) (April 25)
  - Los Angeles Sol 0–0 Boston Breakers – 2 for Los Angeles (Shannon Boxx & Camille Abily) and 2 for Boston (Angela Hucles & Nancy Augustyniak)
  - Washington Freedom 0–0 Chicago Red Stars – 2 for Washington (Abby Wambach & Sonia Bompastor) and 2 for Chicago (Brittany Klein & Megan Rapinoe) (June 13)
  - Chicago Red Stars 3–1 FC Gold Pride – 3 for Chicago (Lindsay Tarpley, Karen Carney, & Carli Lloyd) and 1 for Bay Area (Formiga) (July 12)

=== Streaks ===
- Longest Winning Streak: 4 Games
  - Los Angeles Sol Games 13–16
- Longest Unbeaten Streak: 11 games
  - Los Angeles Sol Games 6–16
- Longest Winless Streak: 10 games
  - FC Gold Pride Games 8–17
- Longest Losing Streak: 4 Games
  - FC Gold Pride Games 12–15
- Longest Shutout: 361 minutes by Karina LeBlanc for Los Angeles Sol
- Longest Drought: 451 minutes for Chicago Red Stars

=== Other Firsts ===
- First player to score twice in a match: Marta for Los Angeles Sol against Sky Blue FC (April 5)
- First come-from-behind victory: Chicago Red Stars 2–1 Washington Freedom (July 1)
- First team to lose to all opponents: Chicago Red Stars with loss to Washington Freedom on July 26
  - The only other team to accomplish this was FC Gold Pride with loss to Sky Blue FC on August 5
- First team to beat all opponents: Los Angeles Sol with win against Boston Breakers on August 9
  - The only other team to accomplish this was Sky Blue FC with win against Los Angeles Sol on August 22
- First goalkeeper assist: Hope Solo (to Christie Welsh) for Saint Louis Athletica against FC Gold Pride on August 9

=== Home Team Record ===
(Regular season only)

- 33 wins, 20 losses, 17 ties – 1.657 PPG
- 87 goals for, 59 goals against – +28 GD

== Related Competitions ==
=== All-Star Game ===
WPS All-Star 2009 was played on August 30 at Soccer Park in the St. Louis suburb of Fenton, Missouri, with the WPS All-Stars defeating Swedish powerhouse Umeå IK of Damallsvenskan 4–2. The match was televised in the US on Fox Soccer Channel.

== See also ==
- List of Women's Professional Soccer stadiums
