= 2010 Women's Professional Soccer season =

Women's Professional Soccer
- Season: 2010
- Champions: FC Gold Pride
- Matches played: 102
- Goals scored: 224 (2.2 per match)
- Average goals/game: 2.20
- Top goalscorer: Marta (20)
- Biggest home win: BOS 4-0 NJ
- Biggest away win: ATL 1-6 BAY
- Highest scoring: ATL 1-6 BAY
- Longest winning run: 5 (BAY days 2–6, 12–16)
- Longest unbeaten run: 12 (BAY days 12–24)
- Longest losing run: 5 (ATL days 2–6, WAS days 13–17)
- Highest attendance: 8,261 (WAS v STL)
- Lowest attendance: 2,118 (WAS v PHI)
- Average attendance: 3,601

The 2010 Women's Professional Soccer season was the second season for the WPS, the top level professional women's soccer league in the United States. Regular season champion FC Gold Pride won the WPS Championship on September 26 with a 4–0 victory over the Philadelphia Independence.

== Changes from the 2009 season ==
- Two franchises, based in Philadelphia, and Atlanta, joined the league.
- A potential Dallas franchise is pending upon finding a site at which to play, and WPS is constantly considering other expansion possibilities as well, such as Seattle.
- The Los Angeles Sol did not return, as that franchise was terminated January 28, 2010 after Anschutz Entertainment Group returned their franchise rights and a buyer was not found.
- The number of games in the regular season increased from 20 to 24.
- On May 27, financial problems caused the Saint Louis Athletica to fold. Players became free agents on June 1.

== Competition format and schedule ==
- The regular season began on April 10 and ended on September 12 with a bye week on May 22 (the date the USWNT hosted Germany's WNT in a friendly); the playoffs began on September 19 and ended on September 26.
- Each team played a total of 24 games, evenly divided between home and away games. Under the following format, each team played three other teams four times each, two at home and two away, and the remaining four teams three times each, two at home and one away or one at home and two away.
- The playoff format was identical to that of the 2009 season. The four teams with the most points from the regular season qualified for the playoffs. The third- and fourth-placed regular season finishers played each other in the single-match First Round, with the winner traveling to face the second-placed regular season finisher in the Super Semifinal midweek. The Super Semifinal winner then traveled to face the first-placed regular season finisher in the WPS Championship.
- Games played against the Saint Louis Athletica before they folded still counted toward a team's point total.

Abbreviation and Color Key: Atlanta Beat - ATL • Boston Breakers - BOS • Chicago Red Stars - CHI • FC Gold Pride - BAY Philadelphia Independence - PHI • Saint Louis Athletica - STL • Sky Blue FC - NJ • Washington Freedom - WSH Win • Loss • Tie • Home
Club	Match																							
Club	1	2	3	4	5	6	7	8	9	10	11	12	13	14	15	16	17	18	19	20	21	22	23	24
Atlanta Beat	PHI	WSH	BAY	PHI	NJ	WSH	CHI	CHI	PHI	BAY	CHI	BOS	NJ	CHI	WSH	BAY	BOS	BOS	PHI	BOS	BAY	BOS	NJ	WSH
Atlanta Beat	0-0	3-1	2-1	1-0	0-1	0-2	0-0	1-0	2-2	0-4	1-1	3-1	0-1	1-0	3-2	0-0	2-0	1-2	3-1	2-3	1-6	1-3	0-0	1-0
Boston Breakers	WSH	PHI	STL	CHI	WSH	BAY	NJ	NJ	BAY	CHI	PHI	ATL	WSH	BAY	CHI	WAS	ATL	PHI	NJ	ATL	PHI	ATL	BAY	NJ
Boston Breakers	1-2	1-1	1-1	0-2	0-0	1-2	0-0	1-2	1-0	1-2	1-2	3-1	2-1	1-2	1-3	3-1	2-0	2-2	4-0	2-3	1-2	1-3	2-0	0-0
Chicago Red Stars	NJ	STL	NJ	BOS	BAY	PHI	BAY	ATL	WSH	ATL	BOS	WSH	ATL	NJ	ATL	BOS	PHI	NJ	BAY	PHI	WAS	BAY	PHI	WAS
Chicago Red Stars	1-0	1-1	0-1	0-2	2-0	0-1	1-0	0-0	2-2	1-0	1-2	0-0	1-1	2-0	1-0	1-3	3-0	1-2	0-0	1-2	2-0	2-3	2-0	2-1
FC Gold Pride	STL	NJ	ATL	NJ	CHI	BOS	CHI	WSH	PHI	BOS	NJ	ATL	WAS	PHI	BOS	WSH	ATL	CHI	WSH	CHI	ATL	NJ	BOS	PHI
FC Gold Pride	2-0	3-1	2-1	0-1	2-0	1-2	1-0	1-1	1-3	1-0	0-2	0-4	3-2	2-0	1-2	1-4	0-0	0-0	0-0	2-3	1-6	1-1	2-0	4-1
Philadelphia Independence	ATL	BOS	WSH	ATL	STL	CHI	WSH	NJ	BAY	NJ	ATL	WSH	BOS	BAY	NJ	CHI	WSH	BOS	CHI	ATL	NJ	BOS	CHI	BAY
Philadelphia Independence	0-0	1-1	3-1	1-0	2-1	0-1	2-1	2-1	1-3	1-4	2-2	3-2	1-2	2-0	4-1	3-0	2-0	2-2	1-2	3-2	1-0	1-2	2-0	4-1
Saint Louis Athletica	BAY	CHI	BOS	WSH	PHI	NJ																		
Saint Louis Athletica	2-0	1-1	1-1	3-1	2-1	2-2	Cancelled																	
Sky Blue FC	CHI	BAY	CHI	BAY	ATL	STL	BOS	PHI	BOS	PHI	BAY	WSH	CHI	ATL	PHI	CHI	ATL	WAS	BOS	PHI	WSH	BAY	ATL	BOS
Sky Blue FC	1-0	3-1	0-1	0-1	0-1	2-2	0-0	2-1	1-2	1-4	0-2	0-0	2-0	0-1	4-1	1-2	1-2	1-1	4-0	1-0	2-1	1-1	0-0	0-0
Washington Freedom	BOS	ATL	PHI	STL	BOS	ATL	PHI	BAY	CHI	PHI	CHI	NJ	BAY	BOS	BAY	ATL	BOS	PHI	NJ	BAY	CHI	NJ	CHI	ATL
Washington Freedom	1-2	3-1	3-1	3-1	0-0	0-2	2-1	1-1	2-2	3-2	0-0	0-0	3-2	2-1	1-4	3-2	3-1	2-0	1-1	0-0	2-0	2-1	2-1	1-0

2010 schedule

== Standings ==
Pos	Team	Pld	W	D	L	GF	GA	GD	Pts	Qualification
1	FC Gold Pride	24	16	5	3	46	19	+27	53	Advance to Championship
2	Boston Breakers	24	10	6	8	36	28	+8	36	Advance to Super Semifinal
3	Philadelphia Independence	24	10	4	10	37	36	+1	34	Advance to First Round
4	Washington Freedom	24	8	7	9	33	33	0	31	Advance to First Round
5	Sky Blue FC	24	7	7	10	20	31	−11	28	
6	Chicago Red Stars	24	7	6	11	21	27	−6	27	
7	Atlanta Beat	24	5	6	13	20	40	−20	21	
8	Saint Louis Athletica	6	2	3	1	9	8	+1	9	Team withdrawn

Source: WPS Soccerway
Rules for classification: 1) points, 2) goal difference, 3) head-to-head result.

== Attendance ==
=== Average home attendances ===
Ranked from highest to lowest average attendance.

Team	GP	Attendance	Average
Boston Breakers	12	53,878	4,490
Chicago Red Stars	12	48,296	4,025
Washington Freedom	12	45,904	3,825
Atlanta Beat	12	44,284	3,690
Sky Blue FC	11	36,521	3,320
FC Gold Pride	12	36,675	3,056
Saint Louis Athletica	4	12,109	3,027
Philadelphia Independence	12	35,605	2,967
Total	87	313,272	3,601

== Playoffs ==
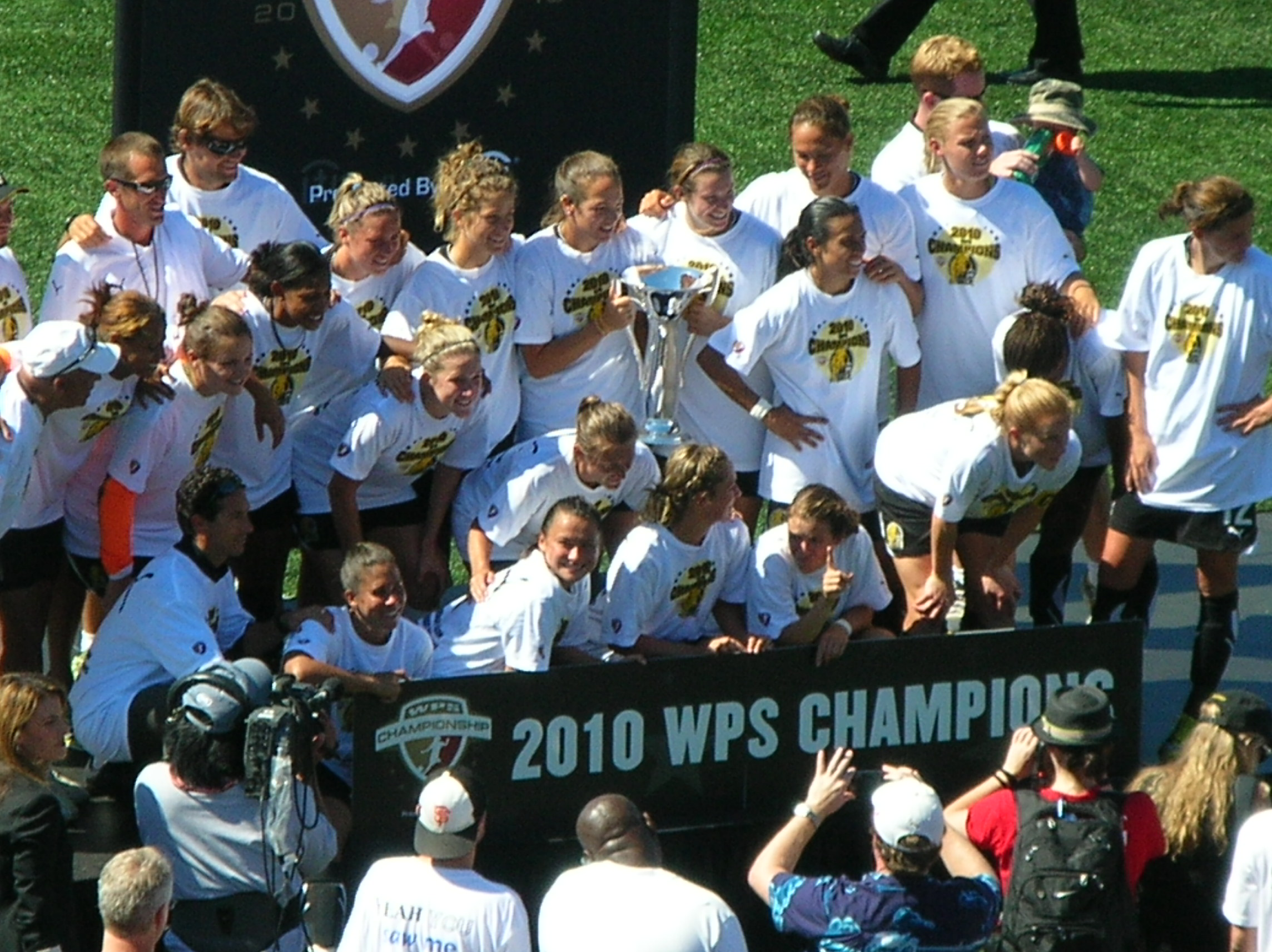
The Gold Pride pose with the WPS Championship trophy

First Round
3	Philadelphia Independence	1
4	Washington Freedom	0

Super Semifinal
2	Boston Breakers	1
3	Philadelphia Independence	2

WPS Championship
1	FC Gold Pride	4
3	Philadelphia Independence	0

=== WPS Championship ===
September 26, 2010
19:30 GMT

FC Gold Pride	4 - 0	Philadelphia Independence
Sinclair 16' 53'; Wilson 28'; Marta 90'

Pioneer Stadium, Hayward, California
Attendance: 5,228
Referee: Jennifer Bennett

FC Gold Pride	Philadelphia Independence

FC Gold Pride:
GK	1	(United States) Nicole Barnhart
FW	9	(United States) Kandace Wilson
DF	5	(Canada) Candace Chapman	(substituted off) 80'
DF	4	(United States) Rachel Buehler (c)
DF	3	(New Zealand) Ali Riley
MF	77	(United States) Shannon Boxx	(substituted off) 75'
MF	20	(France) Camille Abily	(substituted off) 66'
DF	14	(United States) Becky Edwards
FW	15	(United States) Tiffeny Milbrett
FW	12	(Canada) Christine Sinclair
FW	10	(Brazil) Marta (MVP)
Substitutions:
MF	13	(United States) Kristen Graczyk		(substituted in) 80'
FW	7	(United States) Kelley O'Hara		(substituted in) 66'
FW	11	(United States) Kiki Bosio		(substituted in) 75'
Manager:
(United States) Albertin Montoya

Philadelphia Independence:
GK	1	(United States) Val Henderson
DF	15	(United States) Nikki Krzysik
DF	3	(United States) Allison Falk
DF	24	(Cameroon) Estelle Johnson
MF	26	(Iceland) Holmfridur Magnusdottir
MF	6	(United States) Lori Lindsey (c)	(substituted off) 58'
MF	4	(United States) Jen Buczkowski
MF	9	(Sweden) Caroline Seger	(substituted off) 76'
MF	25	(United States) Tina DiMartino
FW	8	(United States) Amy Rodriguez
FW	10	(England) Lianne Sanderson	(substituted off) 64'
Substitutes:
FW	19	(United States) Danesha Adams		(substituted in) 58'
DF	2	(United States) Heather Mitts		(substituted in) 64'
MF	16	(United States) Lyndsey Patterson		(substituted in) 76'
Manager:
(England) Paul Riley

Match officials

- Assistant referees:
  - Marlene Duffy
  - Veronica Perez
- Fourth official: Kari Seitz

Match rules

- 90 minutes.
- 30 minutes of extra-time if necessary.
- Penalty shoot-out if scores still level.
- Seven named substitutes.
- Maximum of three substitutions.

== Leaders ==
=== Scoring ===
Leading Goalscorers
Rank	Player	Club	G	Min
1	(Brazil) Marta	FC Gold Pride	19	2160
2	(United States) Abby Wambach	Washington Freedom	13	1979
3	(United States) Amy Rodriguez	Philadelphia Independence	12	2001
4	(England) Kelly Smith	Boston Breakers	11	1711
5	(Canada) Christine Sinclair	FC Gold Pride	10	2054
6	(England) Eniola Aluko	Saint Louis Athletica/Atlanta Beat	9	1608
7	(United States) Ella Masar	Chicago Red Stars	8	1146
8	(United States) Jordan Angeli	Boston Breakers	7	1457
9	(United States) Tiffeny Milbrett	FC Gold Pride	6	1237
9	(United States) Kelley O'Hara	FC Gold Pride	6	1445

Assist Leaders
Rank	Player	Club	A	Min
1	(Canada) Christine Sinclair	FC Gold Pride	9	2054
2	(United States) Lori Lindsey	Philadelphia Independence	8	1948
2	(United States) Abby Wambach	Washington Freedom	8	1979
4	(France) Camille Abily	FC Gold Pride	6	1103
4	(United States) Amy Rodriguez	Philadelphia Independence	6	2001
6	(Sweden) Caroline Seger	Philadelphia Independence	5	1515
6	(United States) Shannon Boxx	Saint Louis Athletica/FC Gold Pride	5	1705
6	(England) Kelly Smith	Boston Breakers	5	1711
6	(France) Sonia Bompastor	Washington Freedom	5	1877
6	(United States) Heather O'Reilly	Sky Blue FC	5	1980
6	(Brazil) Marta	FC Gold Pride	5	2160

=== Fouls ===
Fouls Committed
Rank	Player	Club	FC	Min
1	(Brazil) Formiga	Chicago Red Stars	42	1887
2	(United States) Jen Buczkowski	Philadelphia Independence	35	1808
3	(United States) Megan Rapinoe	Chicago Red Stars	34	1477
4	(Iceland) Hólmfríður Magnúsdóttir	Philadelphia Independence	31	1593
5	(Sweden) Caroline Seger	Philadelphia Independence	30	1515
6	(England) Katie Chapman	Chicago Red Stars	29	1874
7	(United States) Abby Wambach	Washington Freedom	27	1979
8	(United States) Shannon Boxx	Saint Louis Athletica/FC Gold Pride	25	1705
8	(France) Sonia Bompastor	Washington Freedom	25	1877
10	(England) Kelly Smith	Boston Breakers	24	1711

Fouls Suffered
Rank	Player	Club	FS	Min
1	(France) Sonia Bompastor	Washington Freedom	44	1877
2	(England) Kelly Smith	Boston Breakers	43	1711
3	(United States) Lori Chalupny	Saint Louis Athletica/Atlanta Beat	38	1737
4	(United States) Abby Wambach	Washington Freedom	37	1979
5	(Brazil) Formiga	Chicago Red Stars	31	1887
6	(Japan) Aya Miyama	Saint Louis Athletica/Atlanta Beat	23	1952
7	(United States) Leslie Osborne	Boston Breakers	22	1440
7	(England) Karen Carney	Chicago Red Stars	22	1449
9	(United States) Allie Long	Washington Freedom	21	1847
9	(Brazil) Cristiane	Chicago Red Stars	21	1886

=== Goalkeeping ===
Minimum 60 minutes played per game average

Rank	Goalkeeper	Club	GP	MINS	SOG	SVS	GA	GAA	W-L-T	SHO
1	(United States) Nicole Barnhart	FC Gold Pride	18	1880	92	73	16	0.77	13-3-5	8
2	(United States) Jillian Loyden	Chicago Red Stars	23	2070	99	72	27	1.17	6-11-6	6
3	(United States) Hope Solo	Saint Louis Athletica/Atlanta Beat	22	1980	139	104	36	1.64	6-8-8	6

== Awards ==
=== Player of the Week ===
Week	Player of the Week	Club	Week's Statline
1	(England) Eniola Aluko	Saint Louis Athletica	2 G (40', 62') GWG
2	(United States) Abby Wambach	Washington Freedom	1 G (44'), 2 A (51', 90') GWA
3	(United States) Lori Lindsey	Philadelphia Independence	3 A (55', 58', 68') GWA
4	(France) Sonia Bompastor	Washington Freedom	1 G (20'), 1 A (47')
5	(England) Karen Bardsley	Sky Blue FC	13 SVS, SHO
6	(Brazil) Marta	FC Gold Pride	2 G (16', 38'), GWG
7	(Sweden) Kosovare Asllani	Chicago Red Stars	1 G (56'), GWG
8	(United States) Amy Rodriguez	Philadelphia Independence	1 A (3') 1 G (29'), GWG
9	(Brazil) Marta	FC Gold Pride	1 A (42') 2 G (55', 90'), GWG
10	(United States) Danesha Adams	Philadelphia Independence	1 G (5') 1 A (18'), GWA
11	(United States) Amy Rodriguez	Philadelphia Independence	2 G (62', 72')
12	(Brazil) Marta	FC Gold Pride	1 A (1') 2 G (30', 86'), GWA
13	(United States) Ella Masar	Chicago Red Stars	1 G (42'); 3rd in 3 matches
14	(Canada) Christine Sinclair	FC Gold Pride	2 G (45', 80'), GWG
15	(Sweden) Caroline Seger	Philadelphia Independence	3 A (7', 8', 52'), GWA
16	(United States) Hope Solo	Atlanta Beat	5 SVS + 6 SVS, SHO over 2 matches
17	(England) Kelly Smith	Boston Breakers	2 G (1', 62') vs. ATL, 1 G (52'), 1 A (25') vs. PHI
18	(United States) Amy Rodriguez	Philadelphia Independence	1 G (53') vs. CHI, 2 A (60', 81') and GWA vs. ATL
19	(England) Eniola Aluko	Atlanta Beat	1 G (73'), GWG
20	(United States) Abby Wambach	Washington Freedom	2 G (79' PK, 84'), GWG
21	(Spain) Veronica Boquete	Chicago Red Stars	1 G (4'), GWG vs. PHI, 2 A (50', 90+'), GWA vs. WAS
22	(United States) Kelley O'Hara	FC Gold Pride	2 G (40', 50'), 1 A (41'), GWA

=== Player of the Month ===
Month	Player of the Month	Club	Month's Statline
April	(United States) Lori Lindsey	Philadelphia Independence	4 A in 3 games; Independence 1-0-2 in April
May	(United States) Karen Bardsley	Sky Blue FC	31 saves and 2 SO in 4 games; Sky Blue 1-1-2 in May
June	(United States) Amy Rodriguez	Philadelphia Independence	5 G, 2 A in 5 games; Independence 3-1-1 in June
July	(United States) Jordan Angeli	Boston Breakers	4 G, 1 A in 6 games; Breakers 5-1-0 in July
August	(England) Kelly Smith	Boston Breakers	4 G, 1 A in 5 games; Breakers 3-1-1 in August

=== End-of-year awards ===
WPS announced its end-of-year awards on September 16.

Award	Winner	Club
Michelle Akers Player of the Year	(Brazil) Marta	FC Gold Pride
MedImmune Defender of the Year	(United States) Amy LePeilbet	Boston Breakers
Coast Guard Goalkeeper of the Year	(United States) Nicole Barnhart	FC Gold Pride
Rookie of the Year	(New Zealand) Ali Riley	FC Gold Pride
Coach of the Year	(England) Paul Riley	Philadelphia Independence
Citi Sportswoman of the Year	(United States) Natalie Spilger	Chicago Red Stars
PUMA Golden Boot	(Brazil) Marta	FC Gold Pride

== Statistics ==
=== Scoring ===
- First Goal of the Season: Lauren Cheney for Boston Breakers against Washington Freedom, 7th minute (April 10)
- Earliest Goal in a Match: 2nd minute
  - Lori Lindsey for Philadelphia Independence against Sky Blue FC (June 6)
- Latest Goal in a Match: 90th minute
  - Christie Welsh for Washington Freedom against Atlanta Beat (April 18)
- Widest Winning Margin: 5 Goals
  - Atlanta Beat 1-6 FC Gold Pride (August 28)
- Most Goals Scored in a Match: 7 Goals
  - Atlanta Beat 1-6 FC Gold Pride (August 28)
- First Hat-Trick:
- Fastest Hat-Trick:
- First Own Goal: Allison Falk of Philadelphia Independence for Saint Louis Athletica (8 May)
- Average Goals per Match: 2.45

=== Discipline ===
- First Yellow Card: Fabiana for Boston Breakers against Washington Freedom, 44th minute (April 10)
- First Red Card: Jen Buczkowski for Philadelphia Independence against Boston Breakers, 86th minute (April 18)
- Most Yellow Cards in a Match: 3
  - Boston Breakers 1-1 Philadelphia Independence - 3 for Philadelphia (Caroline Seger, 2x Jen Buczkowski) (April 18)
- Most Red Cards in a Match:

== Related competitions ==
=== All-Star Game ===
WPS All-Star 2010 took place on June 30, a midseason date as opposed to the previous year's postseason All-Star game. It was played at the new Kennesaw State University Soccer Stadium in Kennesaw, Georgia, home to the Atlanta Beat;. The United States Coast Guard once again presented the game, which aired on Fox Soccer Channel again as well.

The all-star selection process was the same as in the previous year, although twice as many players were selected. The top US vote-getter, Abby Wambach, and the top international vote-getter, Marta, then chose between the remaining 20 voted-on players to create their teams, with the 14 at-large selections being distributed by the league. Marta's XI defeated Abby's XI 5–2.
