= Lindsay Massengale =

American soccer defender (born 1976)

Personal information
- Full name: Lindsay Catherine Massengale
- Date of birth: October 6, 1976 (age 50)
- Place of birth: Yuba City, California, U.S.
- Height: 5 ft 2 in (1.57 m)
- Position: Defender

College career
Years	Team	Apps	(Gls)
1995–1998	Clemson Tigers		

Senior career*
Years	Team	Apps	(Gls)
1999–2002	Sacramento Sun		
2002–2003	Boston Breakers		
2004–2008	California Storm		
2009	FC Gold Pride	4	(0)
2012	Boston Breakers		
- * Club domestic league appearances and goals as of 23:15, September 30, 2009 (UTC) ‡ National team caps and goals as of 23:15, September 30, 2009 (UTC)

Lindsay Catherine Massengale (born October 6, 1976) is an American soccer defender who played for FC Gold Pride of Women's Professional Soccer and Boston Breakers in the Women's United Soccer Association.

== Career ==
=== Collegiate career ===
Massengale was a four-year starter for Clemson University where she earned her Bachelor of Science degree in Health Science in 2000. She was an All-ACC Second Team selection in 1997 and finished her career with five goals and 10 assists for a total of 20 points. Clemson advanced to the NCAA Tournament all four years that she played and advanced to the NCAA Final Eight in 1997.

=== Professional career ===
Massengale played for the Boston Breakers in the Women's United Soccer Association, the first women's professional soccer league in the United States from 2001 to 2003.

She played for the FC Gold Pride in the Women's Professional Soccer (WPS) league in 2009.

In 2012, she played for the Boston Breakers in the Women's Premier Soccer League Elite.

=== Coaching career ===
Massengale has over 10 years of coaching experience at the Division I women's soccer level, including several years as assistant coach at Idaho State University and Northeastern University.
