= Kristen Graczyk =

American former soccer forward and defender

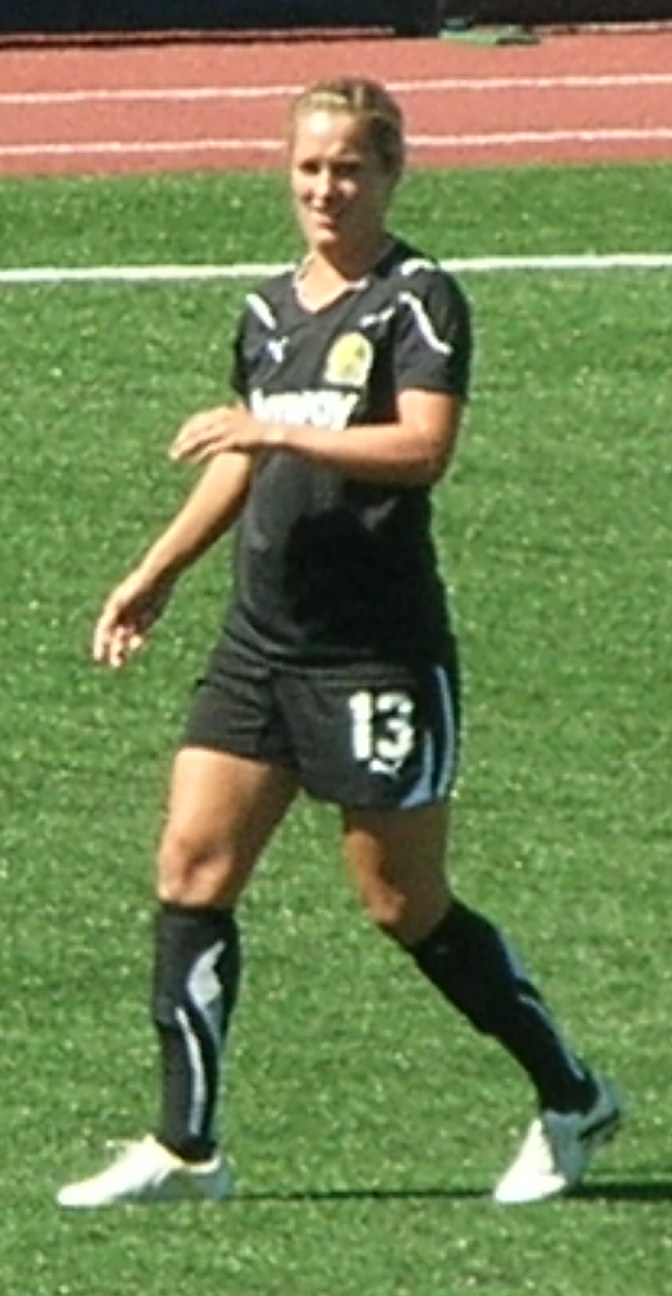
- Graczyk at the 2010 WPS Championship Game

Personal information
- Full name: Kristen Marie Graczyk
- Date of birth: June 27, 1983 (age 43)
- Place of birth: Albuquerque, New Mexico, United States
- Height: 5 ft 7 in (1.70 m)
- Positions: Forward; defender

Youth career
- Rio Vista Soccer Club

College career
| Years | Team | Apps | (Gls) |
| 2001–2004 | Connecticut Huskies | | |

Senior career*
| Years | Team | Apps | (Gls) |
| 2003–2004 | Chicago Cobras | 23 | (22) |
| 2005 | Hampton Roads Piranhas | 9 | (2) |
| 2007–2008 | SoccerPlus Connecticut | | |
| 2009–2010 | FC Gold Pride | 36 | (0) |
- * Club domestic league appearances and goals as of 21:01, December 29, 2014 (UTC) ‡ National team caps and goals as of 09:27, July 25, 2009 (UTC)

Kristen Marie Graczyk (born June 27, 1983) is an American former soccer forward and defender who played for FC Gold Pride of Women's Professional Soccer. Her brother, Mike Graczyk, is a goalkeeper and played for San Jose Earthquakes in Major League Soccer.

Graczyk played for the Connecticut Huskies from 2001 to 2004 and she played a big part in the Huskies run to the 2003 National Championship game. Graczyk scored the match winning goal in overtime against Central Connecticut to help the Huskies advance in the 2003 NCAA Tournament. Gracyzk scored both goals for the Huskies in their 2-0 College Cup victory over Florida State in 2003 to advance to the National Championship game. Her first goal was a header to the near post off of a cross from nine yards. Her second goal sealed the game for the Huskies. She had a ball played to her in front of the box that she drilled into the back of the net. Graczyk also scored both goals for the Huskies in their win over Notre Dame in the 2004 BIG EAST Tournament Championship Game. Graczyk found the ball just outside the box and nailed a left footed shot from about 20 yards out to tie the game for the Huskies with about 18 minutes left in the second half. Graczyk headed in a Karyn Riviere cross at 86:48 to give the Huskies a 2–1 victory to earn their Second BIG EAST Tournament Championship and give the Huskies their automatic berth into the NCAA Tournament.

Gracyzk was the 2003 BIG EAST Offensive Player of the Year and was an All-American in 2003 & 2004. She is UConn's third leading scorer, finishing her career with 57 Goals and 32 Assists for 146 career points. Her 26 career points (10 Goals and 6 Assists) in the NCAA Tournament is a school record.

Graczyk got her start with Chicago Cobras of the W-League. In her first season with the club, she appeared in 10 games, netting 6 goals. In her second, and final season with the club, she appeared in 13 games, scoring 16 goals before moving on to Hampton Roads Piranhas for the 2005 season. The next season brought another change in teams, this time signing with SoccerPlus Connecticut of Women's Premier Soccer League.

She was invited to train with FC Gold Pride of Women's Professional Soccer in 2009. She made the final roster and played an integral role with the club in its first year. She retired from soccer in January 2011 after FC Gold Pride folded.
