= Nicole Barnhart =

American soccer player (born 1981)

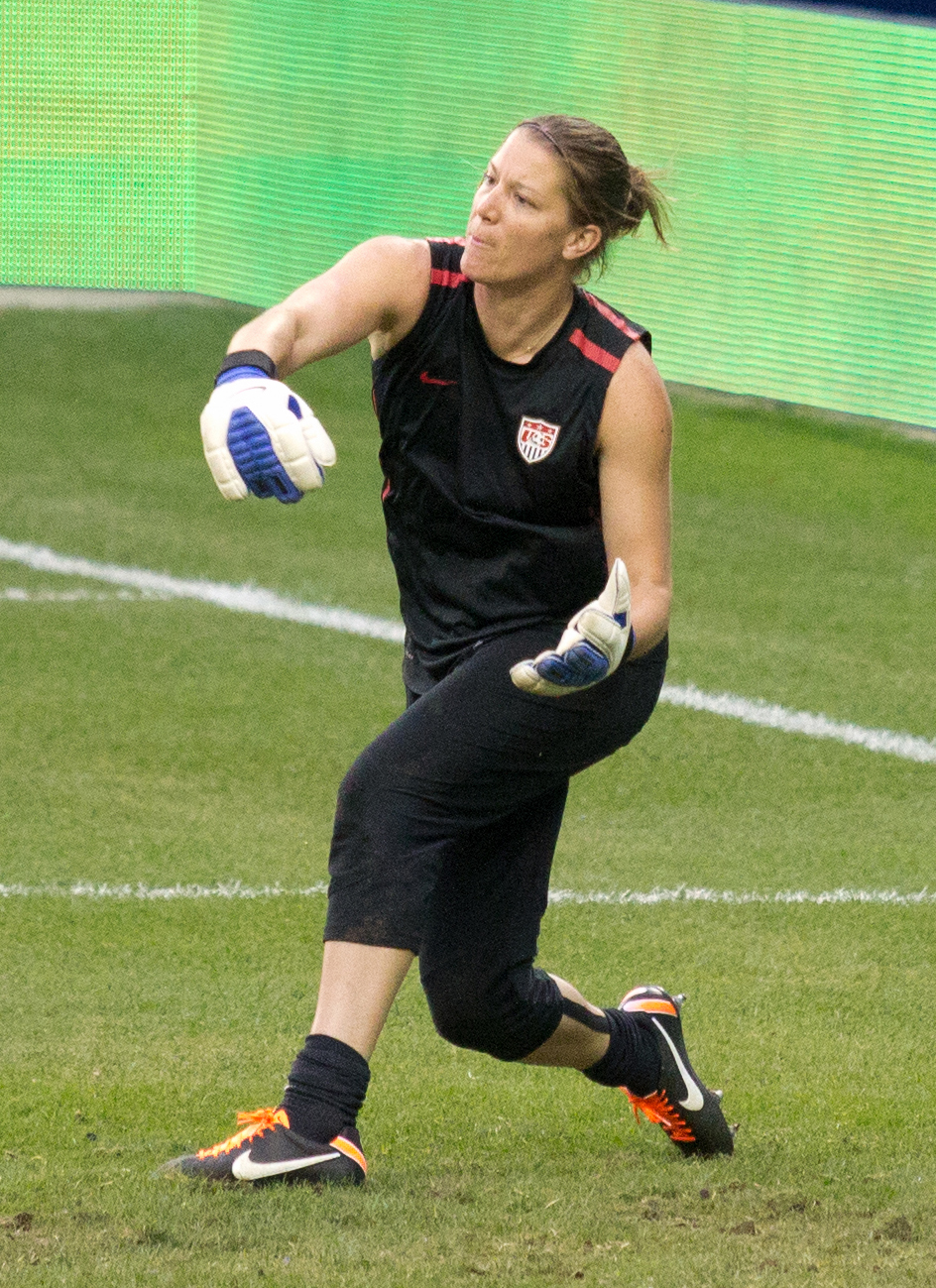
- Barnhart representing the United States in 2011

Personal information
- Full name: Nicole Renee Barnhart
- Date of birth: October 10, 1981 (age 45)
- Place of birth: Pottstown, Pennsylvania, United States
- Height: 5 ft 10 in (1.78 m)
- Position: Goalkeeper

Youth career
- Boyertown SC
- 1992–1998: Souderton Gems
- 1998–2000: FC Delco

College career
Years	Team	Apps	(Gls)
2000–2004	Stanford Cardinal	71	(0)

Senior career*
Years	Team	Apps	(Gls)
2006–2009	California Storm		
2009–2010	FC Gold Pride	37	(0)
2011	Philadelphia Independence	9	(0)
2013–2017	FC Kansas City	108	(0)
2018–2020	Utah Royals	32	(0)
2021	Kansas City	6	(0)
2022–2024	Washington Spirit	3	(0)

International career^{‡}
2004–2013	United States	54	(0)

Managerial career
- 2005–2007: Stanford Cardinal (assistant)
- 2009–2015: Stanford Cardinal (assistant)
- 2019: Utah Royals Reserves (goalkeeping)
- 2025–: Washington Spirit (goalkeeping)
Medal record
Women's soccer
Representing the United States
Olympic Games
Gold medal – first place	2008 Beijing	Team
Gold medal – first place	2012 London	Team
FIFA Women's World Cup
Bronze medal – third place	2007 China	Team
Silver medal – second place	2011 Germany	Team
- * Club domestic league appearances and goals as of January 17, 2025 ‡ National team caps and goals as of October 27, 2013

Nicole Renee Barnhart (born October 10, 1981) is an American retired soccer player who played as a goalkeeper. She played professionally for FC Gold Pride and Philadelphia Independence in Women's Professional Soccer, and FC Kansas City, Utah Royals, Kansas City, and Washington Spirit in the National Women's Soccer League. She is currently the goalkeeping coach for the Washington Spirit.

With the United States national team, she was a two-time Olympic gold medalist. She competed in qualifying matches for the 2008 Beijing Olympics and 2011 FIFA Women's World Cup, 2011 Four Nations Tournament and 2011 Algarve Cup.

== Early life ==
Barnhart was born in Pottstown, Pennsylvania, and grew up in Gilbertsville, Pennsylvania. She attended Boyertown High School in Berks County, Pennsylvania, where she played for the boys' team for all four years, playing on the field as well as in goal. She also played basketball and lacrosse, and was named an All-American.

=== Stanford University ===
Barnhart played college soccer for the Stanford Cardinal at Stanford University. She was named an all-Pacific-10 Conference player in 2002, 2003 and 2004, and holds the Stanford women's record for lowest career goals-against average (0.41).

== Club career ==
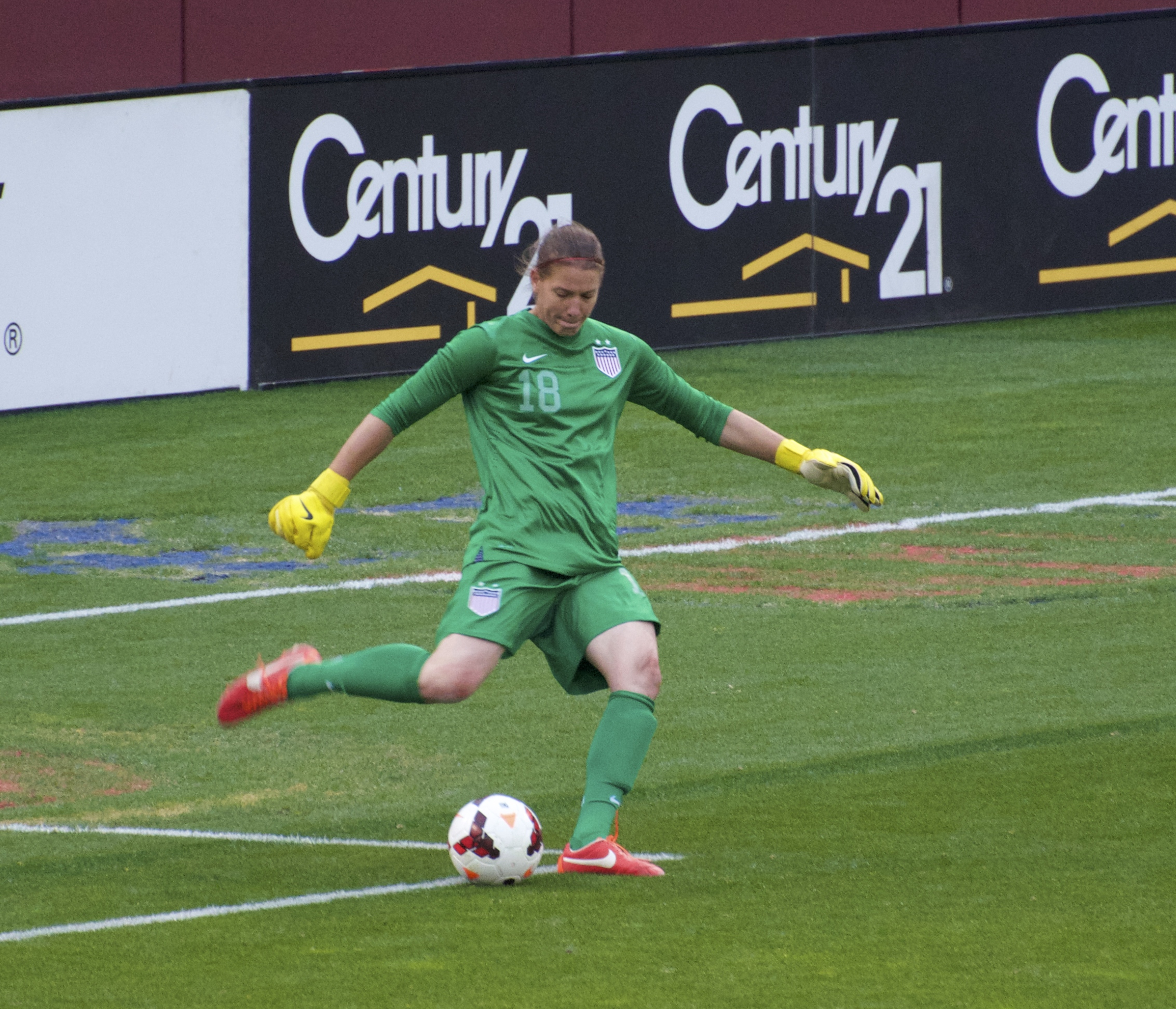
Nicole Barnhart in 2013

In 2009, Barnhart was allocated to FC Gold Pride for the inaugural season of Women's Professional Soccer (WPS).

In 2010, Barnhart helped the FC Gold Pride to the 2010 WPS title, starting 21 games and playing 1880 minutes while making 73 saves and allowing just 16 goals. She had eight shutouts, including the WPS championship game, and was named the WPS Goalkeeper of the Year and a WPS All-Star. She made 74 saves, allowed 23 goals for a 1.44 goals against average (GAA) and earned two shutouts.

In 2011, she signed with the Philadelphia Independence for the 2011 WPS season and started nine total matches to help the club to a WPS playoff berth and a berth in the championship game. She earned a shutout in the 2–0 Super Semifinal victory against magicJack. Barnhart compiled a 4–3–2 record with three shutouts and had a goals against average (GAA) of 1.11.

=== FC Kansas City, 2013–2017 ===
On January 11, 2013, Barnhart was one of three members from the United States women's national team that was allocated to the new NWSL club FC Kansas City, along with Lauren Cheney and Becky Sauerbrunn via the NWSL Player Allocation. Her 2013 regular-season record of ten scoreless "clean sheet" games remained until surpassed by Adrianna Franch in the longer 2017 season. She was named NWSL Goalkeeper of the Year for the 2013 season.

Barnhart appeared in 22 games in 2014, recording 8 clean sheets. She played in both the semi-final and final for FCKC, helping them to win the 2014 NWSL Championship over the Seattle Reign.

In 2015 she was named to the NWSL Second XI and nominated for Goalkeeper of the Year after recording 8 clean sheets in 17 games. Barnhart was crowned NWSL Champion again in 2015 as FC Kansas City defeated Seattle Reign in the final for the second straight year.

Barnhart had similarly strong numbers in 2016, starting 20 games and recording 6 clean sheets, but FC Kansas City failed to qualify for the playoffs. In 2017 Barnhart started all 24 games for FC Kansas City, and recorded 6 shutouts, however FCKC missed the playoffs for the second straight year.

=== Utah Royals FC, 2018–2021 ===
After FC Kansas City ceased operations following the 2017 season, Barnhart was officially added to the roster of the Utah Royals FC on February 12, 2018. Barnhart made her debut for the Royals on June 2 against Sky Blue FC as starting goalkeeper Abby Smith was away on international duty.

=== KC NWSL, 2021 ===
Prior to the start of the 2021 season, the Utah Royals were sold to KC NWSL. Barnhart and Abby Smith split time until Barnhart was released by the club on July 28.

=== Washington Spirit, 2022–2024 ===
Barnhart signed with Washington Spirit in January 2022. She made her first appearance for the team as a stoppage-time substitute for Aubrey Kingsbury on June 11, 2023, in a 2–1 win against Angel City FC. At 41 years and 243 days old, the appearance made her the second-oldest player to appear in an NWSL match, behind Christie Pearce. In 2024 she played one match, a 2-3 loss to the Chicago Red Stars in the NWSL x Liga MX Femenil Summer Cup.

On December 30, 2024, Barnhart announced her retirement.

== International career ==
Barnhart has appeared in 53 matches for the United States women's national soccer team. She made her debut in a five-minute appearance as forward against Mexico on October 16, 2004. As the third U.S. goalkeeper at the 2007 FIFA Women's World Cup, she was only expected to see action in the event of injuries to Hope Solo and Briana Scurry.

Barnhart was the hero of the U.S. Women's 2008 CONCACAF final against Canada when she saved a penalty that won the final.

Barnhart was a member of the gold medal-winning USA team at 2008 Beijing Olympic, although she did not appear in a match with Hope Solo playing all six U.S. matches.

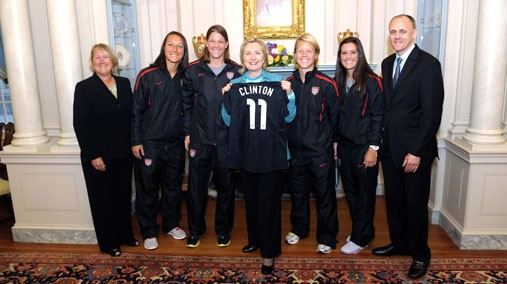
2011 United States women's national soccer team players, Jillian Loyden, Nicole Barnhart, Lori Lindsey, and Ali Krieger, with United States Secretary of State, Hillary Clinton.

In 2010, with Solo out for shoulder surgery and recovery, Barnhart started 11 matches, with 8 wins, 1 loss, and 2 draws, and allowed 5 goals in 990 minutes; including 5 matches in CONCACAF qualifying tournament for FIFA Women's World Cup and 2 shutout playoff matches against Italy that secured the berth for 2011 FIFA Women's World Cup. In 2011, she started 9 matches and won 2 tournaments, at the Four Nations Tournament in China in January and the Algarve Cup in Portugal in March; with 6 wins, 2 losses, and 1 draw. She was on the roster for the 2011 FIFA Women's World Cup alongside Hope Solo, but did not get playing time.

At the 2012 London Olympics, Nicole Barnhart received her second Olympic gold medal as a standby goalkeeper for the United States; she did not get playing time, with Hope Solo playing every minute of the United States' six matches.

As a standby goalkeeper to Briana Scurry and Hope Solo, Barnhart did not compete in a single match in an Olympic or a FIFA World Cup tournament.

== Coaching ==
Barnhart was a volunteer assistant coach at Stanford University. In the 2011 season as a volunteer assistant coach, she helped lead her alma-mater, the Stanford Cardinal, to its first national championship in Kennesaw, Georgia. The Cardinal defeated the Duke Blue Devils 1–0.

On January 17, 2025, the Washington Spirit announced that Barnhart would be staying with the club as a goalkeeping coach. She had already been involved in goalkeeping coaching while she was a player with the club.

== Personal life ==
Barnhart became the secretary of the NWSL Players Association in 2017. In July 2024, she was one of five active NWSL players who represented the NWSLPA at the final negotiations in Philadelphia that updated the league's collective bargaining agreement through 2030.

== Career statistics ==
=== Club career ===
Updated March 23, 2019

Team	Season	League	Domestic league				Domestic playoffs				Total			
Team	Season	League	Apps	Starts	Minutes	Shutouts	Apps	Starts	Minutes	Shutouts	Apps	Starts	Minutes	Shutouts
California Storm	2006–	WPSL												
Total														
FC Gold Pride	2009	WPS	15	15	1350	2	—	—	—	—	15	15	1350	2
FC Gold Pride	2010	WPS	21	21	1880	7	1	1	90	1	22	22	1970	8
Total			36	36	3230	9	1	1	90	1	37	37	3320	10
Philadelphia Independence	2011	WPS	9	9	840	2	2	2	180	1	11	11	1020	3
Total			9	9	840	2	2	2	180	1	11	11	1020	3
FC Kansas City	2013	NWSL	20	20	1800	10	1	1	120	0	21	21	1920	10
FC Kansas City	2014	NWSL	22	22	1980	8	2	2	180	1	24	24	2160	9
FC Kansas City	2015	NWSL	17	17	1530	8	2	2	180	2	19	19	1710	10
FC Kansas City	2016	NWSL	20	20	1800	6	—	—	—	—	20	20	1800	6
FC Kansas City	2017	NWSL	24	24	2160	6	—	—	—	—	24	24	2160	6
Total			103	103	9270	38	5	5	480	3	108	108	9750	41
Utah Royals FC	2018	NWSL	8	7	648	3	—	—	—	—	8	7	648	3
Utah Royals FC	2019	NWSL	20	20	1800	10	—	—	—	—	20	20	1800	10
Total			28	27	2448	13	—	—	—	—	28	27	2448	13
Career total			176	175	15788	62	8	8	750	5	184	183	16538	67

=== International career ===
Nation	Year	International appearances			
Nation	Year	Apps	Starts	Minutes	Shutouts
United States	2004	1	0	5	0
United States	2005	2	2	180	2
United States	2007	1	1	90	1
United States	2008	13	8	885	5
United States	2009	3	2	225	2
United States	2010	11	11	990	7
United States	2011	10	9	810	3
United States	2012	5	1	270	1
United States	2013	8	5	540	3
Career total		54	39	3995	24

== Honors and awards ==
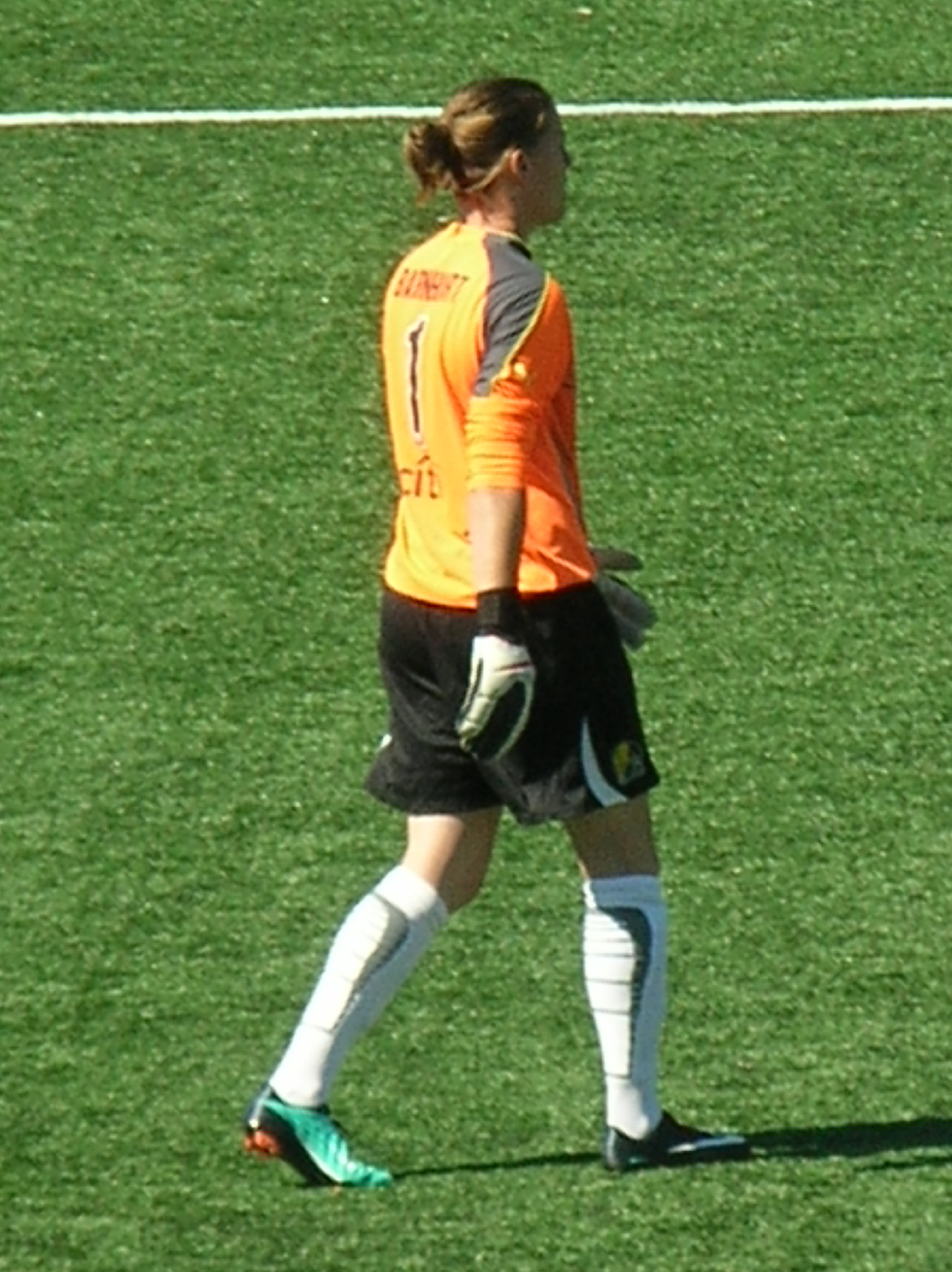
Nicole Barnhart playing for FC Gold Pride at the 2010 WPS Championship game. FC Gold Pride won the championship match 4–0.

=== International ===
- Olympic Gold Medal: 2008, 2012
- Algarve Cup: 2010, 2011
- Four Nations Tournament: 2011
- FIFA Women's World Cup Runner-up: 2011

=== Club ===
with FC Gold Pride:

- WPS championship: 2010

with FC Kansas City:

- NWSL championship: 2014, 2015

=== Individual ===
- NWSL Goalkeeper of the Year: 2013
- Southeastern Pennsylvania Soccer Hall of Fame: Inductee 2024

== U.S. Soccer administration ==
In the Fall 2021 United States Soccer Federation elections, Barnhart won a seat to the federation's board of directors on its Athletes' Council.

In March 2022, Barnhart was part of the Players' Commissioner Search Committee for the NWSL that selected Jessica Berman as the league's new commissioner.

== See also ==
- List of Olympic medalists in football
- All-time FC Gold Pride roster
- List of 2008 Summer Olympics medal winners
- List of 2012 Summer Olympics medal winners
- List of Stanford University people
