= FC Gold Pride =

- Full name: FC Gold Pride
- Founded: September 3, 2008
- Dissolved: November 16, 2010
- Stadium: Pioneer Stadium, Hayward, California
- Capacity: 5,000
- Coordinates: 37°39′26.27″N 122°3′38.41″W
- League: Women's Professional Soccer
- 2010: 1st, WPS Playoff Champions
Home colors	Away colors

FC Gold Pride was an American professional women's soccer club based in the San Francisco Bay Area, which participated in Women's Professional Soccer (WPS). The club replaced the San Jose CyberRays of the defunct Women's United Soccer Association as the top-level women's soccer team in the San Francisco Bay Area. FC Gold Pride moved to its final home of Pioneer Stadium on the campus of CSU East Bay in June 2010 after opening their 2010 home schedule at the Castro Valley High School Athletic Stadium. The club ceased operations in November 16, 2010, two years before the WPS folded, after struggling financially and unable to find new investors.

== Team history ==
=== Founding ===
FC Gold Pride was founded on September 3, 2008, as the seventh and final team to join the new top-tier Women's Professional Soccer league. The team was owned by a group led by Brian and Nancy NeSmith, the former being the CEO of Sunnyvale-based internet technology company Blue Coat Systems. Former San Jose Clash midfielder and local youth coach Albertin Montoya was named the team's first head coach, while former CyberRays and Brazil national team player Sissi was announced as the team's first assistant coach on September 29, 2008.

On November 13, 2008, the team announced that it would play its home matches at Buck Shaw Stadium in Santa Clara, which it shared with the San Jose Earthquakes of Major League Soccer as well as the Santa Clara University soccer teams. The team revealed its official name of FC Gold Pride, and its logo of a lioness, to the public for the first time on November 19, 2008.

On September 16, 2008, WPS conducted its initial player allocation of United States national team players. The league allocated Nicole Barnhart, Leslie Osborne, and Rachel Buehler to FC Gold Pride. On September 24, 2008, the league allocated a further four players to the Bay Area via the 2008 WPS International Draft: strikers Christine Sinclair (Canada) and Eriko Arakawa (Japan), and Brazilian midfielder Formiga and defender Érika. The Pride signed a one-year deal with Formiga in February 2009, as well as Arakawa, post-draft discovery pick Adriane (Brazil), Érika, and Sinclair.

At the 2009 WPS Draft, FC Gold Pride drafted three former college players: UCLA midfielder Christina DiMartino, Notre Dame defender Carrie Dew, and Penn State forward Tiffany Weimer. Also amongst the 2009 draftees was former United States national team star Brandi Chastain.

=== 2009 WPS season ===
FC Gold Pride won their inaugural WPS game against the Boston Breakers on April 5, 2009. The club remained in strong contention until defender Kandace Wilson was injured during a home game against the Los Angeles Sol. After that, FC Gold Pride's second loss at the hands of the Washington Freedom marked the beginning of the club's slide to the bottom of the WPS rankings, where it would remain for the rest of the season. The club's transactions in the wake of Wilson's injury included signing Los Angeles Sol draftee Greer Barnes, elevating developmental player Marisa Abegg to the full roster, and returning Sissi to the field as a player.

In the end, FC Gold Pride failed to make the 2009 Women's Professional Soccer Playoffs, after a must-win game against the Saint Louis Athletica ended in a 1–1 draw. The club finally snapped its ten-game winless streak with a final 3–2 win against the Washington Freedom on August 1, 2009. However, a last loss to Sky Blue FC and a tie with Saint Louis Athletica did not allow FC Gold Pride to avoid finishing last in the WPS standings.

=== 2009–10 off-season moves ===
The only player FC Gold Pride lost to the 2009 WPS Expansion Draft was defender Leigh Ann Robinson, chosen by the Atlanta Beat. Over the course of the offseason, the club traded Allison Whitworth to the Beat for the 10th- and 12th-overall picks in the 2010 WPS Draft, lost team co-captain Leslie Osborne and assists leader Tiffany Weimer to the Boston Breakers in free agency, loaned Eriko Arakawa back to her former Nadeshiko League club NTV Beleza for the remainder of her WPS contract, waived contract options for Adriane, Érika, and Formiga, and in February 2010 also waived Brandi Chastain.

The club signed Canadian player Candace Chapman on October 8, 2009, and after scouting the 2009 UEFA Women's Championship, the club signed Norwegian international Solveig Gulbrandsen on December 10.

FC Gold Pride acquired Los Angeles Sol player Camille Abily in exchange for midfielder Tina DiMartino, FC Gold Pride's top 2009 WPS Draft pick, and the 14th-overall pick in the 2010 draft and rights to a 2009 international discovery player. In the 2010 WPS Draft, FC Gold Pride selected 2009 Hermann Trophy winner Kelley O'Hara, New Zealand international Ali Riley, and 2008 U-20 World Cup champions Becky Edwards and Kaley Fountain, among others.

The Los Angeles Sol ceased operations not long afterward, and in the ensuing 2010 WPS Dispersal Draft FC Gold Pride acquired Marta, Kiki Bosio, and Lindsay Browne. The club separately signed another Los Angeles Sol goalkeeper Brittany Cameron as a free agent.

=== 2010 season ===
FC Gold Pride started fast and kept its momentum running throughout the 2010 season. Despite the departure of Solveig Gulbrandsen and trading Kaley Fountain to the Atlanta Beat, the Pride dominated the league's regular season and on September 26, 2010, won their first WPS Championship by defeating the Philadelphia Independence, 4–0. Three members of the team garnered end of season honors: Marta was named Player of the Year and won the Golden Boot, both for the second consecutive season; Nicole Barnhart was named Goalkeeper of the Year; and Ali Riley was named Rookie of the Year. After the close of the 2010 season, it was revealed on November 16, 2010, that FC Gold Pride had folded and would not be returning for the 2011 season.

== Players ==
=== Team captains ===
- (United States) Leslie Osborne (2009)
- (United States) Rachel Buehler (2009–2010)
- (France) Camille Abily (2010)

== All-time records ==
Only competitive matches (regular season and playoffs) are counted. Wins, draws, and losses are results at the final whistle; the results of penalty shoot-outs are not counted.

Season-by-season results
Season	League	Manager	Nat.	From	To	P	W	D	L	GF	GA	Place	Playoffs
2009	WPS	Albertin Montoya	(United States) USA	Sep 3, 2008	Sep 26, 2010	20	4	6	10	17	28	7th	DNQ
2010	WPS	Albertin Montoya	(United States) USA	Sep 3, 2008	Sep 26, 2010	25	17	5	3	50	19	1st	Champions
Total						45	21	11	13	67	47		

Team records

- Career appearances: 42, Tiffeny Milbrett
- Career goals scored: 20, Marta
- Career assists: 10, Christine Sinclair
- Career shutouts: 11, Nicole Barnhart

== WPS awards ==
- Michelle Akers Player of the Year Award
  - Marta, 2010
- Goalkeeper of the Year
  - Nicole Barnhart, 2010
- Rookie of the Year
  - Ali Riley, 2010
- WPS Golden Boot
  - Marta, 2010
- Regular-season champions (1): 2010
- League champions (1): 2010

== Home stadiums ==
- Buck Shaw Stadium (2009)
- Castro Valley Athletics Stadium (March–June 2010)
- Pioneer Stadium (June 2010)

== See also ==
- Women's Professional Soccer
- National Women's Soccer League
- Women's United Soccer Association
