= 2012 Boston Breakers season =

Boston Breakers
2012 season
- Governor: Michael Stoller
- Head coach: Lisa Cole
- Stadium: Dilboy Stadium
- WPSLE: 2nd
- WPSL Playoffs: Semi-finals
- Women's U.S. Open Cup: Did not enter
- Top goalscorer: Kyah Simon (12)
Home colors	Away colors

The 2012 Boston Breakers season was the club's seventh overall year of existence, fourth consecutive year, and first year as a member of the Women's Premier Soccer League Elite (WPSL Elite).

== Match results ==
=== Key ===
Win Tie Loss

=== Non-competitive fixtures ===
May 13, 2012	D.C. United Women (USL W-L)	0–1	Boston Breakers (WPSLE)	Germantown, Maryland
		BOS report Report	Simon 56' (Luscinski)	Stadium: Maryland SoccerPlex; Attendance: 1,022

=== WPSL Elite ===
May 10, 2012 1	ASA Chesapeake Charge	0–3	Boston Breakers	Arnold, Maryland
7:30 p.m.	Barger (yellow card)	WPSL report BOS report Report	Napoli 1' (Jones) (yellow card); Schoepfer 14' (Napoli); Luscinski 15' (Osborne)	Stadium: Anne Arundel Community College; Attendance: 400

May 18, 2012 2	Boston Breakers	4–1	FC Indiana	Somerville, Massachusetts
7:00 p.m.	Schoepfer 9'; Simon 13' (Schoepfer), 22' (Luscinski); Butt 57' (Simon)	WPSL report BOS report Report; Report	Libertin 11'	Stadium: Dilboy Stadium; Attendance: 2,312

May 23, 2012 3	New York Fury	1–2	Boston Breakers	Hemsptead Village, New York
7:00 p.m.	Mathias 66' (McNeil)	BOS report Report	Butt 10' (Jones); Schoepfer 19' (Simon); Simon (yellow card) 36'	Stadium: Hofstra University; Attendance: 1,300

May 26, 2012 4	Boston Breakers	0–1^{[a]}	Western New York Flash	Somerville, Massachusetts
6:00 p.m.	~~Schoepfer 33', 54' (pen.), 67' (Simon)~~	BOS report Report; Forfeit report	~~Salem 49' (Adriana)~~; ~~Adriana 82'~~	Stadium: Dilboy Stadium; Attendance: 2,342
Note: The Boston Breakers had won 3–2, but on June 18 forfeited the match for fielding an ineligible player in Melissa Henderson, whose international transfer certificate was still held in Russia. The WPSL credited the Western New York Flash with a 1–0 victory and nullified all previous goals in the match. Before the June 18 ruling, Breakers forward Katie Schoepfer's three goals in the match were all nullified, as were goals by Flash players Adriana Martín and Angela Salem.

June 1, 2012 5	FC Indiana	0–4	Boston Breakers	Indianapolis, Indiana
7:00 p.m.	Libertin (yellow card); Cajuste (yellow card); Dolce (yellow card)	BOS report	D'Agostino 30' (Osborne) (yellow card); Schoepfer 34' (King), 41' (Jones); Simon 78'	Stadium: IUPUI Stadium; Attendance: 246

June 3, 2012 6	Chicago Red Stars	1–0	Boston Breakers	Naperville, Illinois
5:00 p.m.	Weissenhofer 34' (Chalupny)	WPSL report CHI report BOS report		Stadium: Benedetti–Wehrli Stadium

June 10, 2012 7	Philadelphia Fever	0–1	Boston Breakers	Birdsboro, Pennsylvania
7:30 p.m.		Report	Simon 45'	Stadium: Daniel Boone HS

June 20, 2012 8	Boston Breakers	4–2	New England Mutiny	Somerville, Massachusetts
7:00 p.m.	Simon 41' (Schoepfer), 45' (Jones), 66' (Jones); Schoepfer 49' (pen.); D'Agostino (yellow card) 83'	WPSL report BOS report Report	Houle 12'; Howarth 59' (yellow card) 76'	Stadium: Dilboy Stadium; Attendance: 2,147

June 23, 2012 9	Boston Breakers	2–0	New York Fury	Somerville, Massachusetts
6:45 p.m.	Simon 35' (Schoepfer), 90' (Schoepfer)	BOS report Report		Stadium: Dilboy Stadium; Attendance: 2,117
Note: Kickoff delayed from 6:00 p.m. due to thunderstorms.

June 30, 2012 10	Boston Breakers	1–0	Chicago Red Stars	Somerville, Massachusetts
6:00 p.m.	Simon 89' (Schoepfer)	BOS report Report		Stadium: Dilboy Stadium; Attendance: 2,092

July 6, 2012 11	Boston Breakers	3–1	ASA Chesapeake Charge	Somerville, Massachusetts
7:00 p.m.	Simon 16' (O'Reilly); Courtney Jones 53' (O'Reilly); Henderson 71' (Donnelly)	BOS report Report	Skidmore 47' (Spivey)	Stadium: Dilboy Stadium; Attendance: 2,026

July 7, 2012 12	New England Mutiny	2–1	Boston Breakers	East Longmeadow, Massachusetts
6:00 p.m.	Simon 47' (DaCosta); D'Agostino (yellow card)	BOS report Report; Report	Weimer 90+'; Dimirdjian 90+' (Mays); Howarth (yellow card)	Stadium: East Longmeadow High School; Attendance: 1,031

July 14, 2012 13	Boston Breakers	2–0	Philadelphia Fever	Somerville, MA
6:00 p.m.	Schoepfer 13' (pen.); Jones 42' (Osborne)	BOS report Report		Stadium: Dilboy Stadium; Attendance: 2,541

July 22, 2012 14	Western New York Flash	0–1	Boston Breakers	Rochester, New York
4:00 p.m.		BOS report WNY report	Reed 22'	Stadium: Sahlen's Stadium

==== Standings ====
Pos	Team	Pld	W	D	L	GF	GA	GD	Pts	Qualification or relegation
1	Boston Breakers	14	11	0	3	28	9	+19	30 (Note: The Boston Breakers forfeited the May 26 match against the Western New York Flash for fielding an ineligible player. The Boston Breakers won the match 3–2. The WPSL credited the Western New York Flash with a 1–0 victory with all previous goals of the match being nullified. Before the June 18 ruling, Breakers forward Katie Schoepfer led the league in scoring with 8 goals. However, her 3 goals at the May 26 match were all forfeited, as were goals by Flash players Adriana and Angela Salem.)	2012 WPSL Elite playoffs
2	Western New York Flash (C)	14	9	3	2	29	8	+21	30	2012 WPSL Elite playoffs
3	New York Fury	14	9	2	3	25	8	+17	29	2012 WPSL Elite playoffs
4	Chicago Red Stars	14	9	1	4	26	11	+15	28	2012 WPSL Elite playoffs
5	New England Mutiny	14	6	3	5	25	34	−9	21	

Source: WPSL Elite 2012 Standings
Rules for classification: 1) points; 2) goal difference; 3) number of goals scored
(C) Champions

=== Semi-finals ===
July 25, 2012	Boston Breakers	1–3	Chicago Red Stars	Rochester, New York
7:00 p.m.	DaCosta 80'	BOS report Report; Report	Fowlkes 14' (Chalupny); Chalupny 54' (Masar); Masar 66' (Sitch)	Stadium: Sahlen's Stadium

== Club ==
=== Roster ===
Note: Flags indicate national team as defined under FIFA eligibility rules; some limited exceptions apply. Players may hold more than one non-FIFA nationality. Squad correct as of June 1, 2012.

No.	Pos.	Nation	Player
4	DF	USA	Cat Whitehill
5	MF	POR	Amanda DaCosta
17	FW	AUS	Kyah Simon
3	MF	AUS	Tameka Butt
84	FW	USA	Courtney Jones
18	FW	USA	Melissa Henderson
19	MF	USA	Bianca D'Agostino
23	DF	USA	Lindsay Massengale
20	FW	ITA	Veronica Napoli
14	DF	USA	Katherine Donnelly
11	FW	ALB	Furtuna Velaj
21	MF	USA	Jess Luscinski
9	MF	USA	Heather O'Reilly
8	DF	USA	Julie King
15	DF	ENG	Emma Thomson
2	FW	USA	Katie Schoepfer
7	DF	USA	Elli Reed
12	MF	USA	Leslie Osborne
25	DF	USA	Taryn Hemmings
26	MF	USA	Kate Incerto
30	GK	USA	Alice Binns

=== Management and staff ===
Front office

- Governor: Michael Stoller

Coaching staff

- Head coach: Lisa Cole
- Assistant coach: Kristine Lilly
- Technical advisor: Marcia McDermott

== See also ==
- 2012 Women's Premier Soccer League Elite season
- 2012 Women's Professional Soccer season
- 2012 in American soccer
- Boston Breakers (WPS)
