= 2012 Women's Premier Soccer League Elite season =

Women's Premier Soccer League Elite
- Season: 2012
- Champions: Western New York Flash
- Matches: 56
- Goals: 164 (2.93 per match)
- Top goalscorer: Adriana Martín (WNY, 14)
- Biggest home win: CHI 5–0 ASC (June 10)
- Biggest away win: NEM 1–5 NYF (May 12); FCI 0–4 BOS (June 1)
- Highest scoring: NEM 1–5 NYF (May 12); NEM 4–2 ASC (May 19); BOS 4–2 NEM (June 20); WNY 3–3 NEM (June 24)
- Highest attendance: 2,342 (BOS v WNY, 5/26)
- Lowest attendance: 246 (FCI v BOS, 6/1)

The 2012 WPSL Elite season was the only season of the WPSL Elite, an upper-level division of the WPSL, one of America's two semi-pro leagues (opposite the W-League). The regular season consisted of fourteen matches per team in a double-round-robin format, played between May 10 and July 22. The regular season was followed by a playoff series.

The 2012 season included three former WPS teams: 2011 WPS champions Western New York Flash, WUSA alumni Boston Breakers, and 2011 WPSL finalists Chicago Red Stars.

== Teams ==
Team	Location	Ground	2011 season
ASA Chesapeake Charge	Severn, MD	Archbishop Spalding High School	WPSL Mid-Atlantic, 3rd
Boston Breakers	Somerville, MA	Dilboy Stadium	WPS, 4th
Chicago Red Stars	Chicago metropolitan area	various	WPSL Midwest North, 1st
FC Indiana	Indianapolis, IN	Carroll Stadium	WPSL Midwest South, 2nd
New England Mutiny	East Longmeadow, MA	East Longmeadow High School	WPSL Northeast, 4th
New York Fury	New York	Hofstra University	WPSL Mid-Atlantic, 1st
Philadelphia Fever	Philadelphia, PA	various	expansion
Western New York Flash	Rochester, NY	Sahlen's Stadium	WPS, 1st

Locations of teams for the 2012 Women's Premier Soccer League Elite season.

== Regular season standings ==
Pos	Team	Pld	W	D	L	GF	GA	GD	Pts	Qualification or relegation
1	Boston Breakers	14	11	0	3	28	9	+19	30 (Note: The Boston Breakers forfeited the May 26 match against the Western New York Flash for fielding an ineligible player. The Boston Breakers won the match 3–2. The WPSL credited the Western New York Flash with a 1–0 victory with all previous goals of the match being nullified. Before the June 18 ruling, Breakers forward Katie Schoepfer led the league in scoring with 8 goals. However, her 3 goals at the May 26 match were all forfeited, as were goals by Flash players Adriana and Angela Salem.)	2012 WPSL Elite playoffs
2	Western New York Flash (C)	14	9	3	2	29	8	+21	30	2012 WPSL Elite playoffs
3	New York Fury	14	9	2	3	25	8	+17	29	2012 WPSL Elite playoffs
4	Chicago Red Stars	14	9	1	4	26	11	+15	28	2012 WPSL Elite playoffs
5	New England Mutiny	14	6	3	5	25	34	−9	21	
6	ASA Chesapeake Charge	14	2	3	9	15	35	−20	9	
7	Philadelphia Fever	14	1	2	11	8	26	−18	5	
8	FC Indiana	14	1	2	11	8	33	−25	5	

Source: WPSL Elite 2012 Standings
Rules for classification: 1) points; 2) goal difference; 3) number of goals scored
(C) Champions

== Match results ==
Home \ Away	ASC	BOS	CHI	FCI	NEM	NYF	PHI	WNY
ASA Chesapeake Charge		0–3	1–3	2–2	3–3	0–2	2–0	0–2
Boston Breakers	3–1		1–0	4–1	4–2	2–0	2–0	0–1
Chicago Red Stars	5–0	1–0		2–0	4–0	2–1	1–0	1–2
FC Indiana	1–1	0–4	0–2		2–3	0–1	0–2	0–5
New England Mutiny	4–2	2–1	3–0	1–0		1–5	2–1	3–3
New York Fury	1–0	1–2	1–1	2–0	4–0		3–0	0–0
Philadelphia Fever	2–3	0–1	1–4	0–1	2–2	0–3		0–0
Western New York Flash	4–0	0–1	3–0	4–1	3–1	0–1	2–0	

Source: WPSL Elite results
Legend: Blue = home team win; Yellow = draw; Red = away team win.

== Results ==
Home teams listed first

=== May ===
May 10, 2012	ASA Chesapeake Charge	0–3	Boston Breakers	Arnold, Maryland
7:30pm	Barger (yellow card)	WPSL report BOS report Report	Napoli 1' (yellow card); Schoepfer 14'; Luscinski 15'	Stadium: Anne Arundel Community College; Attendance: 400

May 12, 2012	New England Mutiny	1–5	New York Fury	East Longmeadow, Massachusetts
7:00pm	Gallegos 77'	report	Mathias 5' 25' 42'; Spencer 14'; Lenczyk 74'	Stadium: East Longmeadow High School; Attendance: 932

May 12, 2012	Western New York Flash	4–1	FC Indiana	Rochester, New York
7:00pm	Adriana 4' 10' 86'; Heyboer 81'	report	Placide 15'	Stadium: Sahlen's Stadium; Attendance: 1,304

May 18, 2012	Boston Breakers	4–1	FC Indiana	Somerville, Massachusetts
7:00pm	Schoepfer 9'; Simon 13', 22'; Butt 57'	WPSL report BOS report Report; Report	Libertin 11'	Stadium: Dilboy Stadium; Attendance: 2,312

May 19, 2012	New England Mutiny	4–2	ASA Chesapeake Charge	East Longmeadow, Massachusetts
7:00pm	Mauer 17'; Gallegos 24'; Houle 32' (pen.); Mays 90+'	report	Collins 27'; Reid 49'	Stadium: East Longmeadow High School; Attendance: 937

May 19, 2012	Western New York Flash	0–1	New York Fury	Rochester, New York
7:00pm			Taylor 54'	Stadium: Sahlen's Stadium

May 20, 2012	Chicago Red Stars	2–0	FC Indiana	River Forest, Illinois
3:00pm	Sitch 45+'; Fowlkes 89' (pen.)		Jeanne Pierre (yellow card); Natacha Cajuste (yellow card)	Stadium: Concordia University

May 20, 2012	Philadelphia Fever	2–2	New England Mutiny	Sewell, New Jersey
7:30pm	Jordan 18'; Bouchard 81'	report	Gallegos 42' 65'	Stadium: Washington High School; Attendance: 732

May 23, 2012	New York Fury	1–2	Boston Breakers	Hemsptead Village, New York
7:00pm	Mathias 66'	BOS report Report	Butt 10'; Schoepfer 19'; Simon (yellow card) 36'	Stadium: Hofstra University; Attendance: 1,300

May 25, 2012	FC Indiana	0–2	Chicago Red Stars	South Bend, Indiana
7:00pm		report	Fowlkes 6'; Chalupny 64'	Stadium: Indiana Invaders Soccer Complex; Attendance: 613

May 26, 2012	Boston Breakers	0–1^{[a]}	Western New York Flash	Somerville, Massachusetts
6:00pm		BOS report Report; Forfeit report		Stadium: Dilboy Stadium; Attendance: 2,342

May 27, 2012	Philadelphia Fever	2–3	ASA Chesapeake Charge	Egg Harbor Township, New Jersey
7:30pm	Haycook 17' 88'	report	Brandt 13'; Brown 31' 45'	Stadium: Egg Harbor Township High School

May 31, 2012	New York Fury	3–0	Philadelphia Fever	Hemsptead Village, New York
7:00pm	Yokers 56' 70'; DiMartino 80'	report		Stadium: Hofstra University

=== June ===
June 1, 2012	FC Indiana	0–4	Boston Breakers	Indianapolis, Indiana
7:00pm	Libertin (yellow card); Cajuste (yellow card); Dolce (yellow card)	Report	D'Agostino 30' (Osborne) (yellow card); Schoepfer 34' (King), 41' (Jones); Simon 78'	Stadium: IUPUI Stadium; Attendance: 246

June 2, 2012	New England Mutiny	2–1	Philadelphia Fever	East Longmeadow, MA
7:00pm	Howarth 22'; Mays 82'	report	Bouchard 11'; Clemens (yellow card) 54'	Stadium: East Longmeadow High School; Attendance: 473

June 3, 2012	Chicago Red Stars	1–0	Boston Breakers	Naperville, IL
5:00pm	Weissenhofer 34'	WPSL report CHI report BOS report		Stadium: Benedetti–Wehrli Stadium

June 3, 2012	New York Fury	0–0	Western New York Flash	Hemsptead Village, NY
7:00pm		report	Klingenberg (yellow card); Reynolds (yellow card)	Stadium: Hofstra University

June 8, 2012	Chicago Red Stars	2–1	New York Fury	River Forest, IL
6:00pm	Mautz 26'; Weissenhofer 68'	report	Zimmeck 85'	Stadium: Concordia University

June 8, 2012	FC Indiana	1–1	ASA Chesapeake Charge	IN
7:00pm	Bellevue 30'	report	Suter 75'	Stadium: IUPUI Stadium

June 9, 2012	Western New York Flash	3–1	New England Mutiny	Rochester, NY
7:00pm	Frierson 24'; Zerboni 31'; Van Egmond 76'	report	Howarth 81'	Stadium: Sahlen's Stadium; Attendance: 753

June 10, 2012	Chicago Red Stars	5–0	ASA Chesapeake Charge	Naperville, IL
3:00pm	Fowlkes 36' 78' 83'; Chalupny 40'; Goralski 86'	report		Stadium: North Central College

June 10, 2012	FC Indiana	0–1	New York Fury	South Bend, IN
7:00pm	Valentine (yellow card) 55'	report	Mathias 26'	Stadium: Invaders Complex

June 10, 2012	Philadelphia Fever	0–1	Boston Breakers	Birdsboro, PA
7:30pm		Report	Simon 45'	Stadium: Daniel Boone HS

June 13, 2012	Western New York Flash	3–0	Chicago Red Stars	Rochester, NY
7:00pm	Frierson 29'; Davis (yellow card) 68'; Adriana 70'; Davis 74'	report	Alkek (yellow card) 12'	Stadium: Sahlen's Stadium

June 14, 2012	FC Indiana	2–3	New England Mutiny	South Bend, IN
7:00pm	Merone (yellow card); Pierre-Louis 56'; Clark 83' (pen.)	report	Howarth 32' 90'; Mays 51'; Reilly (yellow card) 62'; Howarth (yellow card) 89'; Dimirdjian (yellow card) 89'	Stadium: Invaders Complex

June 16, 2012	ASA Chesapeake Charge	0–2	Western New York Flash	Millersville, MD
2:00pm			Adriana 42' 89' (pen.)	Stadium: Old Mill School

June 16, 2012	Chicago Red Stars	4–0	New England Mutiny	Evanston, IL
6:00pm	Weissenhofer 35'; Cinalli 68'; Folkes 73'; Chalupny 84'	report		Stadium: Lakefront Stadium

June 17, 2012	ASA Chesapeake Charge	0–2	New York Fury	Millersville, MD
4:00pm		report	Spencer 38'; Lenczyk 55'	Stadium: Old Mill School

June 17, 2012	Philadelphia Fever	0–0	Western New York Flash	Sewell, NJ
7:30pm				Stadium: Washington HS

June 20, 2012	Boston Breakers	4–2	New England Mutiny	Somerville, MA
7:00pm	Simon 41', 45', 66'; Schoepfer 49' (pen.); D'Agostino (yellow card) 83'	WPSL report BOS report Report	Houle 12'; Howarth 59' (yellow card) 76'	Stadium: Dilboy Stadium; Attendance: 2,147

June 22, 2012	ASA Chesapeake Charge	1–3	Chicago Red Stars	Millersville, MD
7:00pm	Hnatiuk 23' (pen.)	report	Weissenhofer 46', 77'; Chalupny 48'	Stadium: Old Mill School

June 22, 2012	Western New York Flash	2–0	Philadelphia Fever	Rochester, NY
7:30pm	Adriana 27'; Klingenberg 49'	report		Stadium: Sahlen's Stadium

June 23, 2012	Boston Breakers	2–0	New York Fury	Somerville, MA
6:00pm	Simon 35', 90'	BOS report Report		Stadium: Dilboy Stadium; Attendance: 2,117

June 24, 2012	New England Mutiny	3–3	Western New York Flash	East Longmeadow, MA
5:00pm	Howarth 4', 45'; Andrews 25'	report	Adriana 8', 77' (pen.); Klingenberg 20'	Stadium: East Longmeadow High School; Attendance: 793

June 24, 2012	Philadelphia Fever	1–4	Chicago Red Stars	NJ
7:30pm	Ratcliffe 3'	report	Sitch 38', 72'; Mautz 51'; Chalupny 87'	Stadium: Egg Harbor HS

June 28, 2012	New York Fury	1–0	ASA Chesapeake Charge	Hemsptead Village, NY
7:00pm	Lenczyk 38'	report		Stadium: Hofstra University

June 29, 2012	Philadelphia Fever	0–1	FC Indiana	Sewell, NJ
7:30pm		report	Pierre-Louis 15'	Stadium: Washington HS

June 30, 2012	Boston Breakers	1–0	Chicago Red Stars	Somerville, MA
6:00pm	Simon 89'	BOS report Report		Stadium: Dilboy Stadium; Attendance: 2,092

=== July ===
July 1, 2012	ASA Chesapeake Charge	2–2	FC Indiana	Millersville, MD
4:00pm	Barger 86'; Nairn 90+7' (yellow card); Brennan (yellow card)	report	Valentine 17'; Batard 20' (yellow card); Dolce (yellow card)	Stadium: Old Mill School

July 3, 2012	New York Fury	4–0	New England Mutiny	Hemsptead Village, NY
7:00pm	Long 5'; Lenczyk 26' 60'; Spencer 40'	report		Stadium: Hofstra University

July 5, 2012	FC Indiana	0–2	Philadelphia Fever	South Bend, IN
7:00pm				Stadium: Invaders Complex

July 6, 2012	Boston Breakers	3–1	ASA Chesapeake Charge	Somerville, MA
7:00pm	Simon 16'; Jones 53'; Henderson 71'	BOS report Report	Skidmore 47'	Stadium: Dilboy Stadium; Attendance: 2,026

July 7, 2012	Chicago Red Stars	1–0	Philadelphia Fever	Evanston, IL
6:00pm				Stadium: Lakefront Stadium

July 7, 2012	New England Mutiny	2–1	Boston Breakers	East Longmeadow, MA
6:00pm	Simon 47'; D'Agostino (yellow card)	BOS report Report; Report	Weimer 90+'; Dimirdjian 90+'	Stadium: East Longmeadow High School; Attendance: 1,031

July 8, 2012	Western New York Flash	4–0	ASA Chesapeake Charge	Rochester, NY
4:00pm				Stadium: Sahlen's Stadium

July 11, 2012	ASA Chesapeake Charge	3–3	New England Mutiny	Millersville, MD
7:00pm				Stadium: Old Mill School

July 12, 2012	FC Indiana	0–5	Western New York Flash	IN
7:00pm				Stadium: IUPUI Stadium

July 14, 2012	Boston Breakers	2–0	Philadelphia Fever	Somerville, MA
6:00pm	Schoepfer 13' (pen.); Jones 42'	BOS report Report		Stadium: Dilboy Stadium; Attendance: 2,541

July 14, 2012	Chicago Red Stars	1–2	Western New York Flash	Lisle, IL
7:00pm				Stadium: Benedictine University

July 15, 2012	Philadelphia Fever	0–3	New York Fury	Sewell, NJ
7:30pm				Stadium: Washington HS

July 19, 2012	New England Mutiny	3–0	Chicago Red Stars	East Longmeadow, MA
7:00pm				Stadium: East Longmeadow High School

July 19, 2012	New York Fury	2–0	FC Indiana	Hemsptead Village, NY
7:00pm				Stadium: Hofstra University

July 21, 2012	New England Mutiny	1–0	FC Indiana	MA
7:00pm				Stadium: North Hampton High School

July 22, 2012	ASA Chesapeake Charge	2–0	Philadelphia Fever	Millersville, MD
4:00pm				Stadium: Old Mill School

July 22, 2012	Western New York Flash	0–1	Boston Breakers	Rochester, NY
4:00pm		BOS report WNY report	Reed 22'	Stadium: Sahlen's Stadium

July 22, 2012	New York Fury	1–1	Chicago Red Stars	Hemsptead Village, NY
7:00pm	Lenczyk 6'	NY report CHI report Report	Ellenwood 11'	Stadium: Hofstra University

== Statistical leaders ==
=== Top scorers ===
Rank	Player	Club	Goals
1	(Spain) Adriana Martín	Western New York Flash	14
2	(Australia) Kyah Simon	Boston Breakers	12
2	(United States) Laura Heyboer	Western New York Flash	12
4	(United States) Kate Howarth	New England Mutiny	10
5	(United States) Lauren Fowlkes	Chicago Red Stars	8
6	(United States) Katie Schoepfer	Boston Breakers	7
7	(United States) Lori Chalupny	Chicago Red Stars	6
8	(United States) Meghan Lenczyk	New York Fury	5
8	(United States) Merritt Mathias	New York Fury	5
8	(United States) Michele Weissenhofer	Chicago Red Stars	5

=== Top assists ===
Rank	Player	Club	Assists
1	(United States) Courtney Jones	Boston Breakers	6
1	(United States) Katie Schoepfer	Boston Breakers	6
3	(United States) Lori Chalupny	Chicago Red Stars	5
3	(United States) Rebecca Mays	New England Mutiny	5
3	(United States) Merritt Mathias	New York Fury	5
6	(Jamaica) Omolyn Davis	Western New York Flash	4
6	(United States) Katy Frierson	Western New York Flash	4
8	(United States) Riley Houle	New England Mutiny	3
8	(United States) Kate Howarth	New England Mutiny	3
8	(United States) Stephanie Ochs	Western New York Flash	3

== Playoffs ==
=== Semi-finals ===
July 25, 2012	Western New York Flash	2–1	New York Fury	Rochester, NY
5:00pm	Frierson 78'; Heyboer 80'	Report; Report	Long 8'	Stadium: Sahlen's Stadium

July 25, 2012	Boston Breakers	1–3	Chicago Red Stars	Rochester, NY
7:00pm	DaCosta 80'	WPSL report BOS report CHI report Report; Report	Fowlkes 14'; Chalupny 54'; Masar 66'	Stadium: Sahlen's Stadium

=== Championship ===
July 28, 2012	Western New York Flash	1–1 (a.e.t.) (4–2 p)	Chicago Red Stars	Rochester, NY
1:00pm	Pressley 90+4'	WPSL report Report	Ellenwood 41'	Stadium: Sahlen's Stadium; Attendance: 1,221
	Penalties
	Adriana (penalty scored); Reynolds (penalty scored); Zerboni (penalty missed); Van Egmond (penalty scored); Salem (penalty scored)		(penalty scored) Fowlkes; (penalty missed) Sitch; (penalty scored) Forbes; (penalty missed) Wenino
