= 2012 Chicago Red Stars season =

Chicago Red Stars
2012 season
- Owner: Arnim Whisler
- Head coach: Rory Dames
- Women's Premier Soccer League Elite: 4th
- WPSL Elite Cup: 2nd
- U.S. Open Cup: Champions
- Top goalscorer: League: Lauren Fowlkes (7); All: Lauren Fowlkes (8)
Home colors	Away colors

The 2012 Chicago Red Stars season was the fourth season of the soccer club. It was their only season in the Women's Premier Soccer League Elite.

== Major events ==
After the end of the 2011 season the Red Stars and other WPSL and former WPS teams formed a more professional league the WPSL Elite, the other teams included:

Team	Location	Ground	2011 season
ASA Chesapeake Charge	Severn, MD	Archbishop Spalding High School	WPSL Mid-Atlantic, 3rd
Boston Breakers	Somerville, MA	Dilboy Stadium	WPS, 4th
Chicago Red Stars	Chicago metropolitan area	various	WPSL Midwest North, 1st
FC Indiana	Indianapolis, IN	Carroll Stadium	WPSL Midwest South, 2nd
New England Mutiny	East Longmeadow, MA	East Longmeadow High School	WPSL Northeast, 4th
New York Fury	New York	Hofstra University	WPSL Mid-Atlantic, 1st
Philadelphia Fever	Philadelphia, PA	various	expansion
Western New York Flash	Rochester, NY	Sahlen's Stadium	WPS, 1st

Locations of teams for the 2012 Women's Premier Soccer League Elite season.

== Squad ==
=== First-team squad ===
Note: Flags indicate national team as defined under FIFA eligibility rules; some limited exceptions apply. Players may hold more than one non-FIFA nationality.

No.	Pos.	Nation	Player
0	GK	(United States) USA	Kelsey Devonshire
1	GK	(United States) USA	Jamie Forbes
2	DF	(United States) USA	Ashlee Elliott
3	FW	(United States) USA	Ella Masar
4	MF	(United States) USA	Jen Buczkowski
5	MF	(United States) USA	Amanda Cinalli
6	DF	(United States) USA	Lauren Alkek
7	DF	(United States) USA	Elise Weber
8	DF	(United States) USA	Samantha Scofield
9	DF	(United States) USA	Lauren Fowlkes
10	FW	(United States) USA	Shayla Mutz
11	FW	(United States) USA	Michele Weissenhofer
12	MF	(United States) USA	Nicole Lipp
13	DF	(United States) USA	Michelle Wenino
14	FW	(United States) USA	Lindsey Schwartz

No.	Pos.	Nation	Player
15	DF	(Republic of Ireland) IRL	Mary Therese McDonnell
16	DF	(United States) USA	Kecia Morway
17	MF	(United States) USA	Lori Chalupny
18	DF	(United States) USA	Jackie Santacaterina
19	MF	(United States) USA	Kelsey Hough
20	MF	(United States) USA	Vanessa DiBernardo
21	FW	(United States) USA	Allison Doyle
22	DF	(United States) USA	Kara Kabellis
23	MF	(United States) USA	Vanessa Laxgang
24		(United States) USA	Alexandra Heller
30	DF	(United States) USA	Brittany Hengesh
33	MF	(United States) USA	Alyssa Mautz
38	DF	(United States) USA	Julianne Sitch
44	GK	(United States) USA	Kristin Eggert
70	MF	(United States) USA	Ashleigh Ellenwood

Squad correct as of July 20, 2012

=== Second squad ===
Note: Flags indicate national team as defined under FIFA eligibility rules; some limited exceptions apply. Players may hold more than one non-FIFA nationality.

No.	Pos.	Nation	Player
—		(United States) USA	Maggie Murnane
—		(United States) USA	Georgiana Waddle
—		(United States) USA	Megan York

No.	Pos.	Nation	Player
—		(United States) USA	Ariana Kulinczenko
—		(United States) USA	Georgia Waddle
—		(United States) USA	Nicole Sebo

=== Transfers ===
==== In ====
Note: Flags indicate national team as defined under FIFA eligibility rules; some limited exceptions apply. Players may hold more than one non-FIFA nationality.

No.	Pos.	Nation	Player
—		(United States) USA	Ella Masar
—		(United States) USA	Lindsey Schwartz
—		(United States) USA	Brittany Hengesh
—		(United States) USA	Lauren Alkek
—		(United States) USA	Lori Chalupny
—		(United States) USA	Allison Doyle
—		(United States) USA	Maggie Murnane
—		(United States) USA	Kelsey Hough
—		(United States) USA	Nicole Lipp

No.	Pos.	Nation	Player
—		(United States) USA	Georgiana Wagemann
—		(United States) USA	Megan York
—		(United States) USA	Ariana Kulinczenko
—		(United States) USA	Georgia Waddle
—	GK	(United States) USA	Kelsey Devonshire
—		(United States) USA	Ashlee Elliott
—		(United States) USA	Lauren Fowlkes
—		(United States) USA	Mary Therese McDonnell

==== Out ====
Note: Flags indicate national team as defined under FIFA eligibility rules; some limited exceptions apply. Players may hold more than one non-FIFA nationality.

No.	Pos.	Nation	Player
—		(United States) USA	Julie Ewing
—		(United States) USA	Katie Nasenbenny
—		(United States) USA	Shannon McDonnell
—		(United States) USA	Carly Samp
—		(United States) USA	Katie Uyenishi
—		(United States) USA	Leigh Jakes

No.	Pos.	Nation	Player
—		(United States) USA	Megan Oyster
—		(United States) USA	Carissa Miller
—		(United States) USA	Erin Dees
—		(United States) USA	Taylor Vancil
—		(United States) USA	Brianne Rodriguez

== Regular-season standings ==
Pos	Team	Pld	W	D	L	GF	GA	GD	Pts	Qualification or relegation
2	Western New York Flash (C)	14	9	3	2	29	8	+21	30	2012 WPSL Elite playoffs
3	New York Fury	14	9	2	3	25	8	+17	29	2012 WPSL Elite playoffs
4	Chicago Red Stars	14	9	1	4	26	11	+15	28	2012 WPSL Elite playoffs
5	New England Mutiny	14	6	3	5	25	34	−9	21	
6	ASA Chesapeake Charge	14	2	3	9	15	35	−20	9	

Source: WPSL Elite 2012 Standings
Rules for classification: 1) points; 2) goal difference; 3) number of goals scored
(C) Champions

=== Results summary ===
Overall								Home						Away					
Pld	Pts	W	L	T	GF	GA	GD	W	L	T	GF	GA	GD	W	L	T	GF	GA	GD
14	28	9	4	1	26	11	+15	6	1	0	16	3	+13	3	3	1	10	8	+2

Last updated: 22 July 2012
Source: WPSL Elite 2012 Standings
Pld = Matches played; Pts = Points; W = Matches won; T = Matches tied; L = Matches lost; GF = Goals for; GA = Goals against; GD = Goal difference

== Matches ==
Win Tie Loss

=== WPSLE regular season ===
May 20th, 2012	Chicago Red Stars	2–0	FC Indiana	River Forest, Illinois
15:00 CDT (UTC-05)	Sitch 45+'; Fowlkes 89' (pen.)	Red Stars Report		Stadium: Concordia Stadium

May 25th, 2012	FC Indiana	0–2	Chicago Red Stars	South Bend, Indiana
19:00 EDT (UTC-04)		Red Stars Report	Fowlkes 6'; Chalupny 64'	Stadium: Indiana Invaders Soccer Complex

June 3rd, 2012	Chicago Red Stars	1–0	Boston Breakers	Naperville, Illinois
17:00 CDT (UTC-05)	Weissenhofer 35'	Red Stars Report		Stadium: Benedetti–Wehrli Stadium

June 8th, 2012	Chicago Red Stars	2–1	New York Fury	River Forest, Illinois
18:00 CDT (UTC-05)	Mautz 26'; Weissenhofer 68'	Red Stars Report	Zimmeck 85'	Stadium: Concordia Stadium

June 10th, 2012	Chicago Red Stars	5–0	ASA Chesapeake Charge	Naperville, Illinois
15:00 CDT (UTC-05)	Fowlkes 36', 78', 83'; Chalupny 40'; Goralski 86'	Red Stars Report		Stadium: Benedetti–Wehrli Stadium

June 13th, 2012	Western New York Flash	3–0	Chicago Red Stars	Rochester, New York
19:00 EDT (UTC-04)	Frierson 29'; Adriana 70'; Davis 74'	Red Stars Report		Stadium: Sahlen's Stadium

June 16th, 2012	Chicago Red Stars	4–0	New England Mutiny	Evanston, Illinois
18:00 CDT (UTC-05)	Weissenhofer 35'; Cinalli 68'; Folkes 73'; Chalupny 84'	Red Stars Report		Stadium: Lakeside Field

June 22nd, 2012	ASA Chesapeake Charge	1–3	Chicago Red Stars	Millersville, Maryland
19:00 EDT (UTC-04)	Hnatiuk 23' (pen.)	Red Stars Report	Weissenhofer 46', 77'; Chalupny 48'	Stadium: Old Mill High School

June 24th, 2012	Philadelphia Fever	1–4	Chicago Red Stars	Egg Harbor, New Jersey
19:30 EDT (UTC-04)	Ratcliffe 3'	Red Stars Report	Sitch 38', 72'; Mautz 51'; Chalupny 87'	Stadium: Egg Harbor Township High School

June 30th, 2012	Boston Breakers	1–0	Chicago Red Stars	Somerville, Massachusetts
18:00 EDT (UTC-04)	Simon 89'	Red Stars Report		Stadium: Dilboy Stadium

July 7th, 2012	Chicago Red Stars	1–0	Philadelphia Fever	Evanston, Illinois
18:00 CDT (UTC-05)	Fowlkes 67'	Red Stars Report		Stadium: Lakeside Field

July 14th, 2012	Chicago Red Stars	1–2	Western New York Flash	Naperville, Illinois
19:00 CDT (UTC-05)	Alkek 77'	Red Stars Report	Adriana 42'; Frierson 75'	Stadium: Benedetti–Wehrli Stadium

July 19th, 2012	New England Mutiny	1–0	Chicago Red Stars	Longmeadow, Massachusetts
19:00 EDT (UTC-04)		Mutiny Report		Stadium: East Longmeadow High School

July 22nd, 2012	New York Fury	1–1	Chicago Red Stars	New York, New York
19:00 EDT (UTC-04)	Lenczyk 6'	Red Stars Report; Fury Report	Ellenwood 11'	Stadium: Hofstra University

Source: WPSLElite.com Schedule

=== WPSLE playoffs ===
July 25, 2012 Semi-finals	Boston Breakers	1–3	Chicago Red Stars	Rochester, New York
7:00pm	DaCosta 80'	Chicago Red Stars Report; WPSL Elite Report	Folkes 13'; Chalupny 46'; Masar 66'	Stadium: Sahlen's Stadium

July 28, 2012 Final	Western New York Flash	1–1 (a.e.t.) (4–2 p)	Chicago Red Stars	Rochester, New York
1:00pm	Pressley 90+'	Red Stars Report; WPSL Elite Report	Ellenwood 41'	Stadium: Sahlen's Stadium
	Penalties
	Adriana (penalty scored); Reynolds (penalty scored); Zerboni (penalty missed); Van Egmond (penalty scored); Salem (penalty scored)		(penalty scored) Folkes; (penalty missed) Sitch; (penalty scored) Forbes; (penalty missed) Wenino

=== US Women Open Cup ===
June 15, 2012 Region II: Match 1	Chicago Red Stars	2–0	Croatian Eagles	Ft. Wayne, Indiana
15:30		Report

June 16, 2012 Region II: Match 2	Chicago Red Stars	3–0	Kansas City United Metro	Ft. Wayne, Indiana
8:30		Report

June 16, 2012 Region II: Match 3	Chicago Red Stars	2–0	Ft. Wayne Soccer Club	Ft. Wayne, Indiana
12:30		Report

June 17, 2012 Region II: Match 4	Chicago Red Stars	0–0	J.B. Marine S.C.	Ft. Wayne, Indiana
12:00		Report

July 20, 2012 Semi-finals	Chicago Red Stars	5–3	Turbo D’Feeters	Bridgeview, Illinois
10:30	Cinalli 45+', 75'; Hough 48'; Sebo 56'; Laxgang 62'	Red Stars Report	8'; 32'; 64?'	Stadium: Toyota Park Practice field

July 22, 2012 Final	Chicago Red Stars	3–2	New York Athletic Club	Bridgeview, Illinois
	Cinalli 38'; Elliott 54'; Waddle 66'	Red Stars Report		Stadium: Toyota Park

== Squad statistics ==
=== Top scorers ===
Includes all competitive matches. The list is sorted by shirt number when total goals are equal.

Ran	No.	Pos	Nat	Name	WPSL Elite	WPSL Elite Playoffs	U.S. National Open Cup	Total
1	9	DF	(United States)	Lauren Fowlkes	7	1		8
2	17	MF	(United States)	Lori Chalupny	5	1		6
3	11	FW	(United States)	Michele Weissenhofer	5			5
4	5	MF	(United States)	Amanda Cinalli	1		3	4
5	18	DF	(United States)	Jackie Santacaterina			3	3
5	38	MF	(United States)	Julianne Sitch	3			3
6	21	FW	(United States)	Allison Doyle			2	2
6	33	MF	(United States)	Alyssa Mautz	2			2
6		MF	(United States)	Ashleigh Ellenwood		1	1	2
7	2	DF	(United States)	Ashlee Elliott			1	1
7	3	FW	(United States)	Ella Masar		1		1
7	6	DF	(United States)	Lauren Alkek	1			1
7	19	MF	(United States)	Kelsey Hough			1	1
7	23	MF	(United States)	Vanessa Laxgang			1	1
7			(United States)	Zoey Goralski	1			1
7			(United States)	Niki Sebo			1	1
7			(United States)	Georgia Waddle			1	1
-			(United States)	unknown^{[a]}			2	2
				TOTALS	26	4	15	45

Last updated: 28 July 2012
Source: WPSL.com 2012 Goals

=== Top assists ===
Includes all competitive matches. The list is sorted by shirt number when total goals are equal.

Ran	No.	Pos	Nat	Name	WPSL Elite	WPSL Elite Playoffs	U.S. National Open Cup	Total
1	5	MF	(United States)	Amanda Cinalli	3		2	5
1	17	MF	(United States)	Lori Chalupny	4	1		5
2	33	MF	(United States)	Alyssa Mautz	3			3
3	2	DF	(United States)	Ashlee Elliott	2			2
3	3	FW	(United States)	Ella Masar	1	1		2
3	11	FW	(United States)	Michele Weissenhofer	2			2
3	22	DF	(United States)	Kara Kabellis	1		1	2
3	23	MF	(United States)	Vanessa Laxgang			2	2
3	38	DF	(United States)	Julianne Sitch	1	1		2
4	2	DF	(United States)	Lauren Alkek	1			1
4	9	DF	(United States)	Lauren Fowlkes	1			1
4	10	FW	(United States)	Shayla Mutz			1	1
4	13	DF	(United States)	Michelle Wenino		1		1
4	29	MF	(United States)	Kelsey Hough			1	1
4	20	MF	(United States)	Vanessa DiBernardo	1			1
4	21	FW	(United States)	Allison Doyle			1	1
-				unknown^{[a]}			?	
				TOTALS	20	4	8	32

Last updated: 28 July 2012
Source: WPSL.com 2012 Assists

== Team management ==
Position	Name
Chairman	(United States) Arnim Whisler
Head coach	(United States) Rory Dames
Assistant coach	(United States) John DeJulio
General Manager	(United States) Alyse LaHue

Last updated: 27 July 2012
Source: WPSL Elite Chicago Red Stars

== Stadium ==
Stadium	Location	Capacity	Games Played
Concordia Stadium	Concordia University Chicago, River Forest, Illinois	1,500	2
Benedetti-Wehrli Stadium	North Central College, Naperville, Illinois	5,500	3
Lakeside Field	Northwestern University, Evanston, Illinois	2,000	2

Last updated: 27 July 2012
Source: WPSL Elite Chicago Red Stars

== Team awards ==
Award	Player	total
Golden Boot	Fowlkes	7

== Notes ==
- ^{a} Details about the first four matches played in the U.S. Women's Open Cup are sparse with the articles reporting only that Shayla Mutz had 3 goals and an assist and Allison Doyle had two goals and an assist.
