= 2012 Western New York Flash season =

Western New York Flash
2012 season
- General manager: (United States) A. J. Cecere
- Head coach: (New Zealand) Aaran Lines
- Stadium: Sahlen's Stadium
- WPSL Elite League: TBD
- WPSL Elite Playoffs: TBD
- U.S. National Women's Cup: TBD
Home colours	Away colours

The 2012 Western New York Flash season was the club's fourth season of existence. The club played in the newly created WPSL Elite League following the suspension of Women's Professional Soccer.

== Review ==
On January 30, 2012, the WPS announced that the league would suspend operations for the 2012 season, meaning that the Flash will not have a main domestic league to participate in for the season.

== Club ==
=== Roster ===
As of May 22, 2011

No.	Name	Nationality	Pos.	Date of birth (age)	Previous club
Goalkeepers
0	Brittany Cameron	(United States)	GK	December 3, 1986 (age 39)	(United States) FC Gold Pride
24	Ashlyn Harris	(United States)	GK	October 19, 1985 (age 40)	(United States) Boston Breakers
30	Ashleigh Bowers	(United States)	GK	August 2, 1989 (age 37)	(United States) Niagara University
Defenders
2	Alexandra Sahlen	(United States)	RB	September 25, 1982 (age 43)	(United States) Rochester Ravens
3	Ali Riley	(New Zealand)	CB	October 30, 1987 (age 38)	(United States) FC Gold Pride
4	Kimberly Brandão	(Portugal)	CB	April 26, 1984 (age 42)	(United States) Jersey Sky Blue
6	Gina Lewandowski	(United States)	CB	April 13, 1985 (age 41)	(Germany) FFC Frankfurt
23	Whitney Engen	(United States)	RB	November 27, 1987 (age 38)	(United States) Chicago Red Stars
38	Rebecca Moros	(United States)	CB	May 6, 1985 (age 41)	(United States) magicJack
Midfielders
9	Caroline Seger	(Sweden)	CM	March 19, 1985 (age 41)	(Sweden) Linköpings
18	Yael Averbuch	(United States)	CM	November 3, 1986 (age 39)	(England) Arsenal
19	Beverly Goebel	(United States)	CM	July 19, 1988 (age 38)	(United States) Washington Freedom
Forwards

=== Management ===
Position	Staff
General Manager	(United States) A. J. Cecere
Director of Sales & Marketing	(Canada) Renee Meier
Administrative Assistant	(United States) Missy Taylor
Head Coach	(United States) Aaran Lines
Strength & Conditioning Coach	(United States) Demeris Johnson

Last updated: November 24, 2011
Source: Western New York Flash Official Website

== Competitions ==
=== WPSL Elite ===
==== Standings ====
Pos	Team	Pld	W	D	L	GF	GA	GD	Pts	Qualification or relegation
1	Boston Breakers	14	11	0	3	28	9	+19	30 (Note: The Boston Breakers forfeited the May 26 match against the Western New York Flash for fielding an ineligible player. The Boston Breakers won the match 3–2. The WPSL credited the Western New York Flash with a 1–0 victory with all previous goals of the match being nullified. Before the June 18 ruling, Breakers forward Katie Schoepfer led the league in scoring with 8 goals. However, her 3 goals at the May 26 match were all forfeited, as were goals by Flash players Adriana and Angela Salem.)	2012 WPSL Elite playoffs
2	Western New York Flash (C)	14	9	3	2	29	8	+21	30	2012 WPSL Elite playoffs
3	New York Fury	14	9	2	3	25	8	+17	29	2012 WPSL Elite playoffs
4	Chicago Red Stars	14	9	1	4	26	11	+15	28	2012 WPSL Elite playoffs
5	New England Mutiny	14	6	3	5	25	34	−9	21	

Source: WPSL Elite 2012 Standings
Rules for classification: 1) points; 2) goal difference; 3) number of goals scored
(C) Champions

==== Results summary ====
Overall								Home						Away					
Pld	Pts	W	L	T	GF	GA	GD	W	L	T	GF	GA	GD	W	L	T	GF	GA	GD
14	30	9	2	3	29	8	+21	5	2	0	16	4	+12	4	0	3	13	4	+9

==== Matches ====
12 May 2012 1	Western New York Flash	4–1	FC Indiana	Rochester, New York
19:00	Martín 4', 10', 86'; Laura Hayboer 81'	Report	Lovely Placide 15'	Stadium: Sahlen's Stadium; Attendance: 1,304

19 May 2012 2	Western New York Flash	0–1	New York Fury	Rochester, New York
19:00			Taylor 54'	Stadium: Sahlen's Stadium

26 May 2012 3	Boston Breakers	0–1	Western New York Flash	Somerville, Massachusetts
18:00		Report		Stadium: Dilboy Stadium; Attendance: 2,342

3 June 2012 4	New York Fury	0–0	Western New York Flash	Hofstra University
19:00		Report	Klingenberg (yellow card); Reynolds (yellow card)	Stadium: James M. Shuart Stadium

9 June 2012 5	Western New York Flash	3–1	New England Mutiny	Rochester, New York
19:00	Katy Frierson 24'; Zerboni 31' van Egmond 76'	Report	Howarth 81'	Stadium: Sahlen's Stadium; Attendance: 753

13 June 2012 6	Western New York Flash	3–0	Chicago Red Stars	Rochester, New York
19:00	Katy Frierson 29'; Davis (yellow card) 68' (goal) 74'; Adriana Martín 70'	Report	Lauren Alkek (yellow card) 12'	Stadium: Sahlen's Stadium

16 June 2012 7	ASA Chesapeake Charge	0–2	Western New York Flash	Chesapeake Bay
14:00			Adriana Martín 42', 89' (pen.)	Stadium: Old Mill School

17 June 2012 8	Philadelphia Fever	0–0	Western New York Flash	Sewell, NJ
19:30				Stadium: Washington HS

22 June 2012 9	Western New York Flash	2–0	Philadelphia Fever	Rochester, New York
19:30	Adriana Martín 27'; Klingenberg 49'	Report		Stadium: Sahlen's Stadium

24 June 2012 10	New England Mutiny	3–3	Western New York Flash	East Longmeadow, MA
17:00	Howarth 4', 45'; Morgan Andrews 25'	Report	Adriana Martín 8', 77' (pen.); Klingenberg 20'	Stadium: East Longmeadow High School; Attendance: 793

8 July 2012 11	Western New York Flash	4–0	ASA Chesapeake Charge	Rochester, New York
16:00				Stadium: Sahlen's Stadium

12 July 2012 12	FC Indiana	0–5	Western New York Flash	Indianapolis
19:00				Stadium: IU Michael A. Carroll Track & Soccer Stadium

14 July 2012 13	Chicago Red Stars	1–2	Western New York Flash	Lisle, Illinois
19:00				Stadium: Benedictine University

22 July 2012 14	Western New York Flash	0–1	Boston Breakers	Rochester, New York
16:00				Stadium: Sahlen's Stadium

=== WPSL Elite Playoffs ===
25 July 2012 Semi Final	Western New York Flash	2–1	New York Fury	Rochester, New York
17:00	Katy Frierson 78'; Laura Hayboer 80'		Long 8'	Stadium: Sahlen's Stadium

28 July 2012 Final	Western New York Flash	1–1 (a.e.t.) (4 - 2 p)	Chicago Red Stars	Rochester, New York
13:00	Toni Pressley 90+6'	Report	Ellenwood 40'	Stadium: Sahlen's Stadium; Attendance: 1,221
	Penalties
	Adriana (penalty scored); Reynolds (penalty scored); Zerboni (penalty missed); Van Egmond (penalty scored); Salem (penalty scored)		(penalty scored) Fowlkes; (penalty missed) Sitch; (penalty scored) Forbes; (penalty missed) Wenino
