= 2013 NWSL supplemental draft =

The 2013 NWSL Supplemental Draft took place on February 7, 2013.

== Round 1 ==
Pick	Player	Pos.	NWSL team	Previous team	College team
1	Stephanie Ochs	FW	Washington Spirit	Western New York Flash	USD
2	Nikki Krzysik	DF	Seattle Reign FC	New York Fury	Virginia
3	Joanna Lohman	MF	Boston Breakers	DC United	Penn State
4	Lindsay Tarpley	FW	Chicago Red Stars	-	UNC
5	Katy Frierson	MF	Sky Blue FC	Western New York Flash	Auburn
6	Courtney Jones	FW	FC Kansas City	Boston Breakers	UNC
7	Estelle Johnson	DF	Western New York Flash	New York Fury	Kansas
8	Tina Ellertson	DF	Portland Thorns FC	-	Washington

== Round 2 ==
Pick	Player	Pos.	NWSL team	Previous team	College team
1	Tori Huster	MF	Washington Spirit	Western New York Flash; Newcastle Jets	FSU
2	Lauren Barnes	DF	Seattle Reign FC	Beach Futbol Club	UCLA
3	Katie Schoepfer	FW	Boston Breakers	Boston Breakers	Penn State
4	Lauren Fowlkes	DF	Chicago Red Stars	Chicago Red Stars	Notre Dame
5	Brittany Cameron	GK	Sky Blue FC	Western New York Flash	USD
6	Bianca Henninger	GK	FC Kansas City	New York Fury	Santa Clara
7	Angela Salem	DF	Western New York Flash	Western New York Flash; Newcastle Jets	Francis Marion
8	Angie Kerr	MF	Portland Thorns FC	-	Portland

== Round 3 ==
Pick	Player	Pos.	NWSL team	Previous team	College team
1	Jordan Angeli	MF	Washington Spirit	-	Santa Clara
2	Laura Heyboer	FW	Seattle Reign FC	Western New York Flash	MSU
3	Bianca D'Agostino	MF	Boston Breakers	Boston Breakers	Wake Forest
4	Michelle Wenino	DF	Chicago Red Stars	Chicago Red Stars	Colorado
5	CoCo Goodson	DF	Sky Blue FC	FC Twente	Irvine
6	Merritt Mathias	FW	FC Kansas City	New York Fury	Texas A&M
7	Kim Yokers	MF	Western New York Flash	New York Fury	Cal
8	Michele Weissenhofer	FW	Portland Thorns FC	Chicago Red Stars	Notre Dame

== Round 4 ==
Pick	Player	Pos.	NWSL team	Previous team	College team
1	Natasha Kai	FW	Washington Spirit	-	Hawaii
2	Liz Bogus	FW	Seattle Reign FC	Pali Blues	Arizona State
3	Jasmyne Spencer	FW	Boston Breakers	New York Fury; Brøndby	Maryland
4	Jackie Santacaterina	DF	Chicago Red Stars	Chicago Red Stars	Illinois
5	Meghan Lenczyk	FW	Sky Blue FC	New York Fury	Virginia
6	Casey Nogueira	MF	FC Kansas City	FC Dallas	UNC
7	Valerie Henderson	GK	Western New York Flash	Bay Area Breeze	UCLA
8	Marian Dalmy	DF	Portland Thorns FC	-	Santa Clara

== Round 5 ==
Pick	Player	Pos.	NWSL team	Previous team	College team
1	Megan Mischler	FW	Washington Spirit	Hammarby	West Virginia
2	Michelle Betos	GK	Seattle Reign FC	New York Fury	Georgia
3	Lauren Alkek	DF	Boston Breakers	Chicago Red Stars	Oklahoma
4	Alyssa Mautz	MF	Chicago Red Stars	Chicago Red Stars	Texas A&M
5	Kandace Wilson	DF	Sky Blue FC	-	Cal State Fullerton
6	Tina DiMartino	MF	FC Kansas City	New York Fury	UCLA
7	Ashley Grove	FW	Western New York Flash	Rochester	Maryland
8	Jessica Shufelt	FW	Portland Thorns FC	Ottawa Fury	Connecticut

== Round 6 ==
Pick	Player	Pos.	NWSL team	Previous team	College team
1	Heather Cooke	DF	Washington Spirit	FC Jax Destroyers	Loyola (Maryland)
2	Kaley Fountain	DF	Seattle Reign FC	-	Wake Forest
3	Jessica Luscinski	MF	Boston Breakers	Boston Breakers	Boston University
4	PASS	-	Chicago Red Stars	-	-
5	Allison Falk	DF	Sky Blue FC	California Storm	Stanford
6	Casey Berrier	DF	FC Kansas City	PK-35	Loyola (Chicago)
7	PASS	-	Western New York Flash	-	-
8	PASS	-	Portland Thorns FC	-	-

== See also ==
- List of NWSL drafts
- List of foreign NWSL players
