= 2011 WPS Draft =

The 2011 WPS College Draft took place on January 14, 2011. It was the third college draft held by Women's Professional Soccer to assign the WPS rights of college players to the American-based teams.

== Format ==
Official WPS release

- Western New York Flash select first and have an extra selection at the end of the first round
- The 2011 WPS Draft consists of four rounds and 24 picks overall.

== Round 1 ==
Pick	Player	Pos.	WPS Team	Previous Team
1	Alex Morgan	F	Western New York Flash	California
2	Sinead Farrelly	M	Philadelphia Independence	Virginia
3	Meghan Klingenberg	M	Washington Freedom	North Carolina
4	Christen Press	F	Washington Freedom	Stanford
5	Lauren Fowlkes	D	Philadelphia Independence	Notre Dame
6	Keelin Winters	M	Boston Breakers	Portland
7	Kylie Wright	M	Atlanta Beat	UCLA
8	Elli Reed	M	Western New York Flash	Portland

== Round 2 ==
Pick	Player	Pos.	WPS Team	Previous Team
9	Jennifer Stoltenberg	F	Philadelphia Independence	Oregon
10	Omolyn Davis	M	Washington Freedom	George Mason
11	Caitlin Farrell	D	Philadelphia Independence	Wake Forest
12	Whitney Palmer	F	Boston Breakers	Oklahoma

== Round 3 ==
Pick	Player	Pos.	WPS Team	Previous Team
13	Rose Augustin	M	Western New York Flash	Notre Dame
14	Meghan Lenczyk	F	Atlanta Beat	Virginia
15	Lauren Barnes	D	Philadelphia Independence	UCLA
16	Alyssa Mautz	M	Sky Blue FC	Texas A&M
17	Amanda DaCosta	M	Washington Freedom	Florida State
18	Bianca D'Agostino	M	Philadelphia Independence	Wake Forest
19	Katherine Sheeleigh	F	Boston Breakers	Harvard

== Round 4 ==
Pick	Player	Pos.	WPS Team	Previous Team
20	Ashleigh Bowers	GK	Western New York Flash	Niagara
21	Lauren Alkek	D	Sky Blue FC	Oklahoma
22	Katie Fraine	GK	Washington Freedom	Florida
23	Teresa Rynier	M	Philadelphia Independence	James Madison
24	Tanya Taylor	F	Boston Breakers	UC Irvine

== Draft Notes ==
WPS transactions pages '09'10 '11
