= Emma Thomson =

English football manager (born 1990)

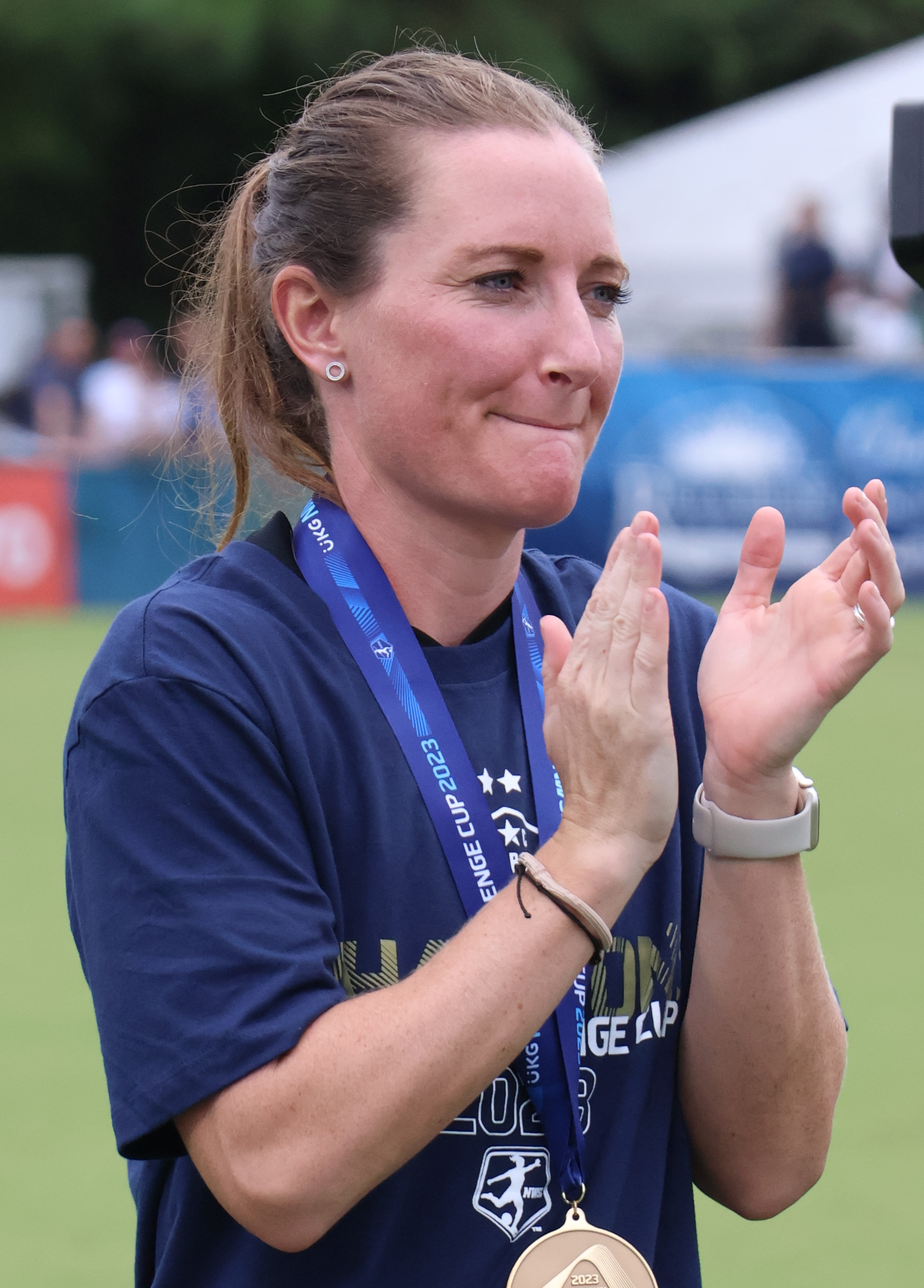
- Thomson with the North Carolina Courage in 2023

Personal information
- Full name: Emma Jennie Thomson
- Date of birth: 21 January 1990 (age 36)
- Place of birth: Nottinghamshire, England
- Height: 5 ft 4 in (1.63 m)
- Position: Centre-back

Team information
- Current team: North Carolina Courage (assistant coach)

Youth career
- Retford United
- Doncaster Rovers Belles

College career
Years	Team	Apps	(Gls)
2008–2011	Penn State Nittany Lions	86	(2)

Senior career*
Years	Team	Apps	(Gls)
2012	Boston Breakers	9	(0)
2013	Doncaster Rovers Belles		

International career
2005–2006	England U-15		
2006–2007	England U-17		

Managerial career
- 2013–2014: St. John's Red Storm (graduate assistant)
- 2015–2019: George Mason Patriots (assistant)
- 2021–: North Carolina Courage (assistant)
- * Club domestic league appearances and goals

Emma Jennie Thomson (born 21 January 1990) is an English association football manager and former player who is an assistant coach for the North Carolina Courage of the National Women's Soccer League (NWSL). She played college soccer for the Penn State Nittany Lions.

== Playing career ==
Born and raised in Nottinghamshire, Thomson began playing football with her brother when she was young. After two seasons with Retford United, she joined Doncaster Rovers Belles. She was recruited to play college soccer for Penn State in the spring of 2008. She played with teammates including Alyssa Naeher and Katie Schoepfer and scored a goal against Minnesota in the Big Ten tournament final as a freshman in 2008. She was named a team captain before her junior season in 2010. She helped the Nittany Lions win four consecutive Big Ten regular-season titles. She was named second-team All-Big Ten in 2010 and 2011. After college, she played for the Boston Breakers of the Women's Premier Soccer League Elite and Doncaster Rovers Belles.

== Managerial career ==
Thomson began coaching as a graduate assistant to the St. John's Red Storm in 2013. After two seasons, she became an assistant coach to Todd Bramble with the George Mason Patriots in 2015. She also coached youth soccer for FC Virginia in the Development Academy.

Thomson moved to coach for the North Carolina Courage Academy in the summer of 2020. She began working as an assistant coach for the North Carolina Courage of the National Women's Soccer League (NWSL) in 2021, then assumed the role full time under head coach Sean Nahas in 2022. North Carolina won the NWSL Challenge Cup in both 2022 and 2023.

== Personal life ==
Thomson and her wife have a son.

== Honors and awards ==
=== Player ===
Penn State Nittany Lions

- Big Ten Conference: 2008, 2009, 2010, 2011
- Big Ten women's soccer tournament: 2008

Individual

- Second-team All-Big Ten: 2010, 2011
- Big Ten all-freshman team: 2008

=== Manager ===
North Carolina Courage

- NWSL Challenge Cup: 2022, 2023
