= Brittany Taylor =

Brittany Taylor may refer to:

- Brittany Taylor (Daria), a character on the US TV series Daria
- Brittany Taylor (soccer) (born 1987), American soccer player
