= Meghan Lenczyk =

American soccer player (born 1989)

Personal information
- Full name: Meghan Jeanne Lenczyk
- Date of birth: March 15, 1989 (age 37)
- Place of birth: McLean, Virginia, United States
- Position: Forward

College career
Years	Team	Apps	(Gls)
2007–2010	Virginia Cavaliers		

Senior career*
Years	Team	Apps	(Gls)
2006	FC Virginia		(36)
2009	Washington Freedom Reserves		
2011	Atlanta Beat	14	(2)
2012	New York Fury		
- * Club domestic league appearances and goals

Meghan Jeanne Lenczyk (born March 15, 1989) is an American professional soccer player who was last played for the New York Fury of the Women's Premier Soccer League Elite (WPSL Elite). She also played for Atlanta Beat, New York Fury, Washington Freedom Reserves, and F.C. Virginia.

== Youth career ==
Lenczyk played youth soccer for McLean Rockets of the Region 1 Premier League. She also played high school soccer for Langley High School. The Washington Post named Lenczyk its All-Met high school player of the year in 2007.

== College career ==
Lenczyk played for the Virginia Cavailers of the University of Virginia from 2007 to 2010. In the 2010 season, her 12 goals tied with Sinead Farrelly for the team's leading goalscorer. As of 2022, Lenczyk was tied for eighth all-time in career goals scored with the Cavaliers (36).

== Club career ==
=== Washington Freedom Reserves, 2009 ===
The Washington Freedom signed Lenczyk to its USL W-League reserves team in 2009.

=== Atlanta Beat, 2011 ===
Atlanta Beat selected Lenczyk with the 14th pick in the 2011 WPS Draft. In her professional debut, she scored the match-winning goal against defending champions Sky Blue FC ina 1–0 victory. She made 14 appearances for the Beat, scoring two goals and being credited with one assist.

=== Philadelphia Independence, 2012 ===
On January 10, 2012, the Philadelphia Independence signed Lenczyk as a free agent for the 2012 Women's Professional Soccer season. However, the league suspended play on January 30 over legal issues and folded on May 18.

=== New York Fury, 2012 ===
Lenczyk reunited with Philadelphia Independence coach Paul Riley as part of a "superteam" friendly against D.C. United Women. Riley's team won 1–0 on a goal by Lenczyk.

Lenczyk then joined Riley's New York Fury, playing in the Women's Premier Soccer League Elite after the WPS's folding.

=== Sky Blue FC, 2013 ===
On February 7, 2013, Sky Blue FC selected Lenczyk with the 29th pick in the 2013 NWSL Supplemental Draft. While Sky Blue coach Jim Gabarra suggested in February 2013 that Lenczyk would likely play for the team, she did not appear in a match for Sky Blue, and the right to sign her to a contract had not yet been exercised by the time of the 2014 NWSL Expansion Draft.
