= Philadelphia Fever =

Philadelphia Fever may refer to:

- Philadelphia Fever (MISL) (1978–1982), a men's indoor soccer team, predecessor of Los Angeles Lazers
- Philadelphia Fever (WPSL) (founded 2012), a women's soccer team
