= Kate Howarth (soccer) =

American professional soccer player

Personal information
- Full name: Kate Lynn Howarth
- Date of birth: July 3, 1991 (age 35)
- Place of birth: Grand Blanc, Michigan, United States
- Height: 5 ft 6 in (1.68 m)
- Position: Forward

Youth career
- 1999–2005: Flint Steelers
- 2006–2009: Michigan Hawks

College career
Years	Team	Apps	(Gls)
2009–2012	Miami Hurricanes		

Senior career*
Years	Team	Apps	(Gls)
2012	New England Mutiny	12	(11)
2013	Boston Breakers	4	(0)
2014–2019	New England Mutiny		(58)
2020	Orlando Pride	0	(0)
- * Club domestic league appearances and goals as of August 1, 2013

Kate Lynn Howarth (born July 3, 1991) is an American professional soccer player who last played as a forward for Orlando Pride of the National Women's Soccer League (NWSL). She previously played for the NWSL's Boston Breakers.

== Early life ==
Howarth started playing soccer in 1999 for the Flint Steelers. She played for the team until 2005 and then joined the Michigan Hawks youth team until 2009.

=== University of Miami ===
In 2009, she started playing collegiate soccer for the Miami Hurricanes for which she played until 2012. While playing for the Hurricanes, Howarth was named Second-Team All-ACC and the NCAA Division I All-Southeast Third Team in 2011.

== Club career ==
=== New England Mutiny, 2012 ===
In 2012, Howarth played for the New England Mutiny in the Women's Premier Soccer League Elite (WPSL-Elite), the top division of women's soccer in the United States at the time.

=== Boston Breakers, 2013 ===
In March 2013, Howarth reported to the Portland Thorns for preseason. After the signing deadline, Howarth's rights were released and she was put on waiver. Boston Breakers immediately obtained Howarth's rights.

In April 2013, Howarth signed a professional contract with the Boston Breakers of the National Women's Soccer League after training with the team. She made her professional debut for the team on May 4, 2013, in a match against the Chicago Red Stars in which she came on as an 89th-minute substitute for Sydney Leroux. Boston won the match 4–1. After making four appearances for the Breakers, she was waived by the team in June 2013.

=== New England Mutiny, 2014–2019 ===
After a season with the Boston Breakers, Howarth returned to the Mutiny to captain the team. She was named to the all-UWS first team in 2016–2019. In 2019, Howarth was also named Player of the Year, where she scored in every game she appeared in.

Howarth is Mutiny's all-time leading goalscorer and point-scorer with 69 and 155 respectively.
