= Jordan Clark (soccer) =

American soccer player (born 1989)

Personal information
- Full name: Jordan Marie Lyons Clark
- Date of birth: August 3, 1989 (age 37)
- Place of birth: Brecksville, Ohio, U.S.
- Height: 5 ft 10 in (1.78 m)
- Position: Midfielder

College career
Years	Team	Apps	(Gls)
2007–2011	Akron Zips	76	(6)

Senior career*
Years	Team	Apps	(Gls)
2021–2022	Alavés	25	(1)
- * Club domestic league appearances and goals

Jordan Marie Lyons Clark is an American former women's soccer player who played for Alavés.
