= Courtney Jones (soccer) =

American soccer player

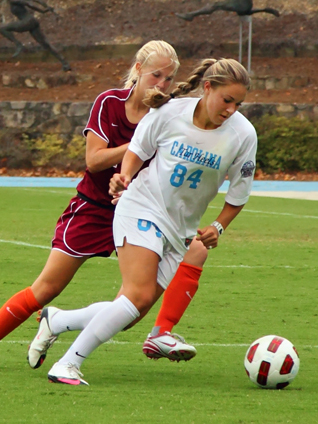

Personal information
- Full name: Courtney Brooke Jones Louks
- Birth name: Courtney Brooke Jones
- Date of birth: May 21, 1990 (age 36)
- Place of birth: Palo Alto, California, United States
- Height: 5 ft 8 in (1.73 m)
- Positions: Forward; defender

College career
Years	Team	Apps	(Gls)
2008–2011	North Carolina Tar Heels		

Senior career*
Years	Team	Apps	(Gls)
2012	Boston Breakers	14	(2)
2013	FC Kansas City	3	(0)
2014	Boston Breakers	18	(3)
- * Club domestic league appearances and goals

Courtney Brooke Jones Louks (née Jones; born May 21, 1990) is an American retired professional soccer forward and defender. She last played for Boston Breakers in the NWSL.

== Early life ==
Born in Palo Alto, California to National Football League (NFL) player, Brent Jones and his wife Dana, Jones attended Monte Vista High School in Danville, California where she was an NSCAA high school All America her sophomore, junior and senior seasons and soccer team captain in 2007 and 2008. In 2006 and 2007, she was named most valuable offensive player of the squad. Jones was a two-time two-time Tri-Valley Player of the Year and was named Cal-Hi Player of the Year in 2006, 2007 and 2008. During her senior year, she was named the NSCAA California High School Player of the Year, was a Wendy's High School Heisman Recipient, and was the MVP of the Monte Vista squad.

Jones played club soccer for the Mustang Soccer Club, playing for the played for the Blast & Fury on their U13, U14, U15, U16, U17 and U18 teams as a forward. She was a member of the Mustang Fury teams that won the U.S. Youth Soccer regional titles in 2003 and 2008, played on the team that won the State Cup championship in 2003, and the Mustang Fury teams that won US club state and regional titles in 2007.

Also a track athlete, Jones set the school record in the 4x100 meter relay and for the 100-meter dash.

=== University of North Carolina ===
Jones attended the University of North Carolina where she played for the North Carolina Tar Heels from 2009 to 2012 winning two NCAA championships, two Atlantic Coast Conference regular-season championships, and two Atlantic Coast Conference Tournament championships. She was a four-year starter at forward and one of only 19 players to score at least 30 goals and record at least 30 assists in her career.

As a sophomore in 2009, she played in 26 games, finished second on the team with four game-winning goals and finished as the Tar Heels' second-leading scorer with 29 points. In 2010, she led the Atlantic Coast Conference in scoring and earned second-team All-ACC honors.

Jones finished her collegiate career with 36 goals and 32 assists in 96 games with 93 starts. She tied for team lead in goals scored as a senior with six.

== Club career ==
=== FC Kansas City ===
Jones was selected during the first round (sixth overall) by FC Kansas City during the 2013 NWSL Supplemental Draft.

=== Boston Breakers ===
In the off-season, FC Kansas City traded Jones to the Boston Breakers for the eighth overall pick in the 2014 NWSL College Draft (Nkem Ezurike). January 22, 2015 Jones retired from professional soccer.

== International career ==
Jones was a member the United States women's under-20 national team pools in 2009 and 2010.
