= Leslie Osborne =

American soccer player and sports commentator (born 1983)

- Osborne in 2026

Personal information
- Full name: Leslie Marie Osborne
- Date of birth: May 27, 1983 (age 43)
- Place of birth: Milwaukee, Wisconsin, United States
- Height: 5 ft 8 in (1.73 m)
- Position: Midfielder

College career
| Years | Team | Apps | (Gls) |
| 2001–2004 | Santa Clara Broncos | 99 | (44) |

Senior career*
| Years | Team | Apps | (Gls) |
| 2001 | Chicago Cobras | | |
| 2005 | California Storm | 6 | (1) |
| 2009 | FC Gold Pride | 19 | (0) |
| 2010–2011 | Boston Breakers | 34 | (0) |
| 2012 | Boston Breakers | | |
| 2013 | Chicago Red Stars | 18 | (1) |

International career^{‡}
- United States U-16
- United States U-18
| | United States U-19 | 21 | (4) |
| | United States U-21 | 8 | |
| 2004–2009 | United States | 61 | (3) |
Medal record
Women's football (soccer)
Representing the United States
FIFA Women's World Cup
| Bronze medal – third place | 2007 China | Team |
- * Club domestic league appearances and goals as of August 2, 2014 ‡ National team caps and goals as of August 2, 2014

Leslie Marie Osborne (born May 27, 1983) is a retired American soccer defensive midfielder who last played for the Chicago Red Stars in the NWSL in 2013. She is a former member of the United States women's national soccer team and previously played for FC Gold Pride and the Boston Breakers in the WPS. She announced her retirement as a player in March 2014. In 2023, Leslie co-founded Bay FC alongside fellow former USWNT and professional club players Brandi Chastain, Danielle Slaton, and Aly Wagner.

== Early life ==
Born in Milwaukee, Wisconsin, Osborne grew up in Brookfield, Wisconsin and attended Catholic Memorial High School in Waukesha, Wisconsin.

=== Santa Clara University ===
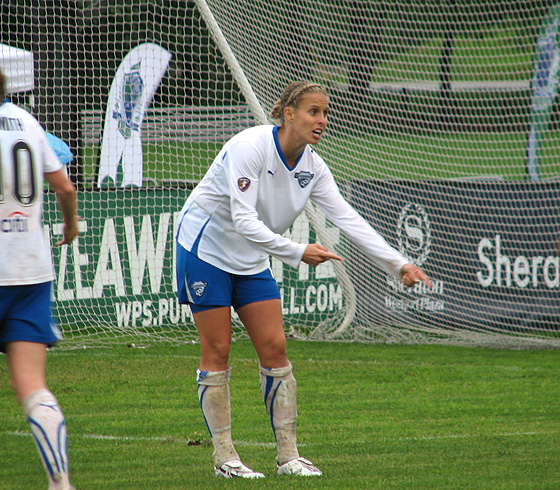
Osborne in St. Louis in 2010.

Osborne played soccer at Santa Clara University in Santa Clara, California. As a freshman, she was a key member of the Santa Clara team that won the 2001 NCAA Women's Soccer Championship. As a senior in 2004, she was a semifinalist for the Hermann Trophy and won the Honda Sports Award as the nation's outstanding collegiate female player.

== Playing career ==
=== Club ===
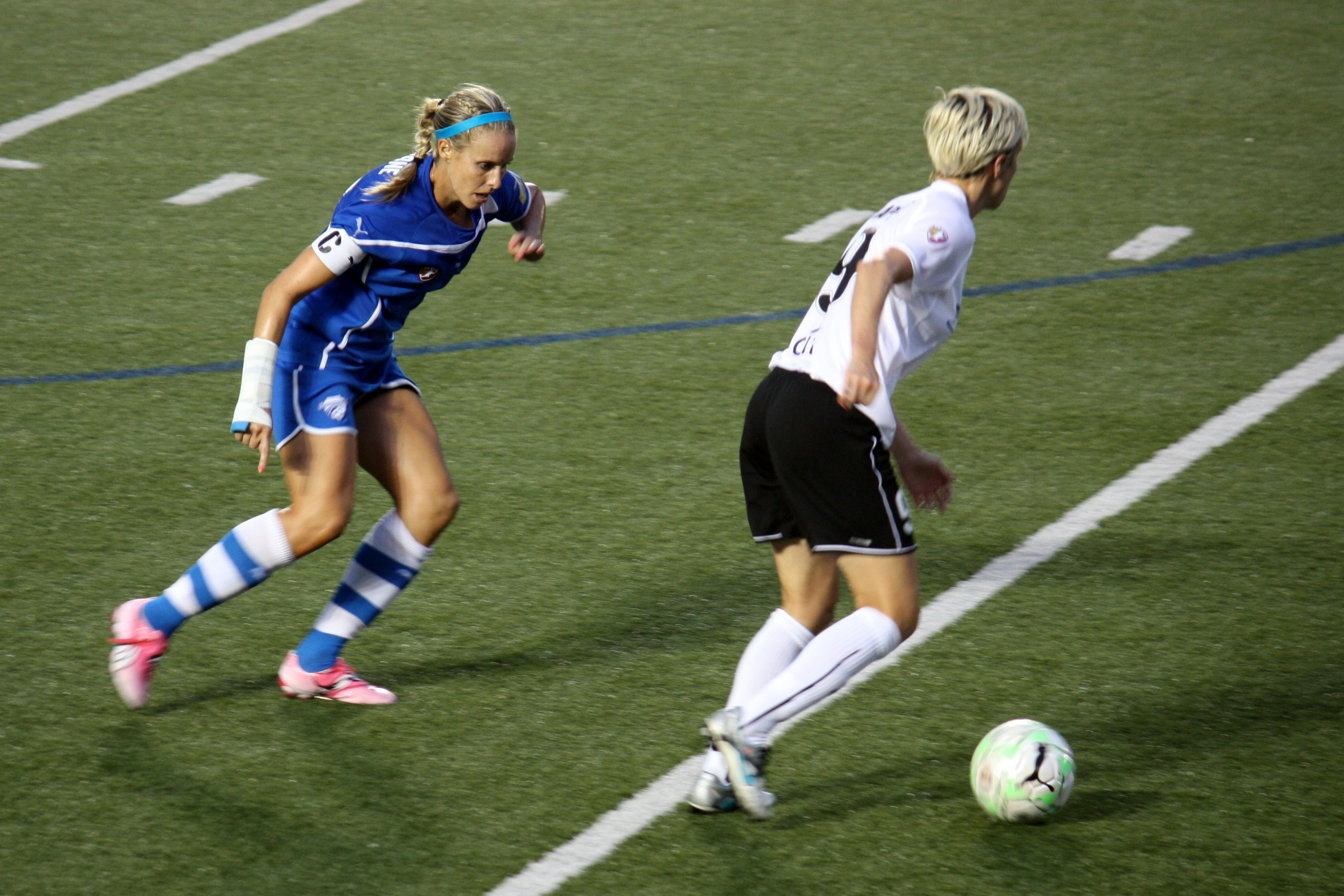
Osborne defends against Megan Rapinoe in August 2011

==== FC Gold Pride ====
In 2009, she played for the FC Gold Pride, in the inaugural season of the Women's Professional Soccer (WPS) league.

==== Boston Breakers ====
In 2010, Osborne was made a free agent and signed with the Boston Breakers.

When the WPS suspended operations in early 2012 and later folded, Osborne continued with the Breakers as they moved into the Women's Premier Soccer League Elite. She played a key role in securing investors for the team in both the WPS and WPSL Elite.

==== Chicago Red Stars ====
In 2013, she joined the Chicago Red Stars in the new National Women's Soccer League.

On March 11, 2014 she announced her retirement from professional soccer.

=== International ===
Osborne was a member of U.S. national youth teams in 2002 and 2003, and earned her first cap with the senior national team on January 30, 2004 against Sweden. After sitting out the first U.S. game of the 2007 FIFA Women's World Cup in favor of Shannon Boxx, she played all 90 minutes in all five remaining matches. During the 4-0 semifinal loss to Brazil, Osborne scored an own goal in an attempt to clear a corner kick.

In May 2008, Osborne tore her ACL before the 2008 Olympics, which caused her to miss the Beijing games. She took nearly a year to rehab the knee injury, causing her to miss several national team games and lose her regular starting position on the national team.

=== International goals ===
Key (expand for notes on "international goals" and sorting)
| Location | Geographic location of the venue where the competition occurred Sorted by country name first, then by city name |
| Lineup | Start – played entire match on minute (off player) – substituted on at the minute indicated, and player was substituted off at the same time off minute (on player) – substituted off at the minute indicated, and player was substituted on at the same time (c) – captain Sorted by minutes played |
| Min | The minute in the match the goal was scored. For list that include caps, blank indicates played in the match but did not score a goal. |
| Assist/pass | The ball was passed by the player, which assisted in scoring the goal. This column depends on the availability and source of this information. |
| penalty or pk | Goal scored on penalty-kick which was awarded due to foul by opponent. (Goals scored in penalty-shoot-out, at the end of a tied match after extra-time, are not included.) |
| Score | The match score after the goal was scored. Sorted by goal difference, then by goal scored by the player's team |
| Result | The final score. Sorted by goal difference in the match, then by goal difference in penalty-shoot-out if it is taken, followed by goal scored by the player's team in the match, then by goal scored in the penalty-shoot-out. For matches with identical final scores, match ending in extra-time without penalty-shoot-out is a tougher match, therefore precede matches that ended in regulation |
| aet | The score at the end of extra-time; the match was tied at the end of 90' regulation |
| pso | Penalty-shoot-out score shown in parentheses; the match was tied at the end of extra-time |
| | Green background color – exhibition or closed door international friendly match |
| | Orange background color – Continental Games or regional tournament |
NOTE on background colors: Continental Games or regional tournament are sometimes also qualifier for World Cup or Olympics; information depends on the source such as the player's federation. NOTE: some keys may not apply for a particular football player

| | Date | Location | Opponent | Lineup | Min | Assist/pass | Score | Result | Competition |
|---|---|---|---|---|---|---|---|---|---|
| 1 | October 1, 2006 | (United States) Carson | Chinese Taipei | off 63' (on Miller) | 8 | Kristine Lilly | 1–0 | 10–0 | Friendly |
| 2 | November 26, 2006 | (United States) Carson | Canada | off 91' (on Lloyd) | 6 | unassisted | 1–0 | 2–1 | Gold Cup: final |
| 3 | May 10, 2008 | (United States) Washington | Canada | on 70' (off Tarpley) | 87 | Amy Rodriguez | 6–0 | 6–0 | Friendly |

== Coaching career ==
Osborne was an assistant coach for the Santa Clara women's team for several years.

== Personal life ==
Osborne is married to Ricky Lewis, with whom she has three daughters.

== Sponsor ==
Osborne has a primary sponsorship with German sportswear company, Puma.
