= Alyssa Mautz =

American soccer player

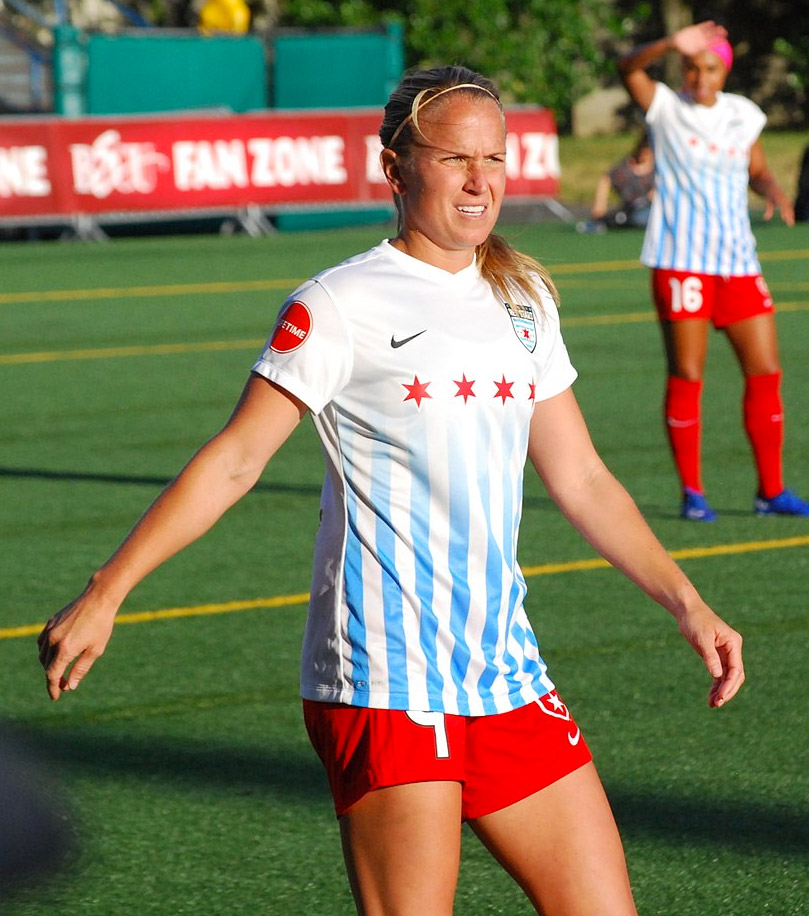
- Mautz playing for Chicago Red Stars in 2017

Personal information
- Full name: Alyssa Lee Mautz
- Date of birth: July 29, 1989 (age 37)
- Place of birth: O'Fallon, Missouri, United States
- Height: 5 ft 5 in (1.65 m)
- Positions: Forward; midfielder

Youth career
- St. Louis Soccer Club

College career
Years	Team	Apps	(Gls)
2007	Saint Louis Billikens		
2008–2010	Texas A&M Aggies	67	(21)

Senior career*
Years	Team	Apps	(Gls)
2011	Sky Blue FC	5	(1)
2012	Chicago Red Stars		
2013–2022	Chicago Red Stars	143	(16)
2013	→ Zorky (loan)	9	(1)
2016–2017	→ Perth Glory (loan)	14	(0)
2017–2018	→ Adelaide United (loan)	12	(2)
2018–2019	→ Perth Glory (loan)	13	(5)

International career
2008	United States U-20		

Managerial career
- 2014: Texas A&M Aggies (assistant)
- 2022–Present: Texas A&M Aggies (assistant)
- * Club domestic league appearances and goals as of 31 July 2022

Alyssa Lee Mautz (born July 29, 1989) is an American former professional soccer forward and midfielder. She played for the Chicago Red Stars of the NWSL from 2013 to 2022, and played on loan to Australian club Perth Glory for the 2018–19 W-League season. She previously played for Sky Blue FC in Women's Professional Soccer (WPS), Zorky in the Russian Women's Football Championship and has represented the United States at the U-23 level. She retired from the Chicago Red Stars in 2022 to accept a job as an assistant coach at Texas A&M University.

== Early life ==
Born and raised in Missouri, Mautz attended Fort Zumwalt West High School in O'Fallon, Missouri where she was named All-State, All-Metro and All-Conference all four years. She netted 133 goals during her high school career, the fifth-most in Missouri girls' soccer history. As a junior, she was named National Soccer Coaches Association of America All-Region. Mautz was named Metro Player of the Year in 2006 and 2007 and earned State Player of the Year honors as a senior. During her senior season, she helped the team to the state championship in senior season and she was named an NSCAA All-American.

Mautz played club soccer for the St. Louis Soccer Club and led the team to 10 straight state titles. She also played on state and regional Olympic Development Program (ODP) teams.

== College career ==
Mautz attended Saint Louis University for the 2007 season before transferring to Texas A&M University in January 2008. In 2008, her first season at Texas A&M, she made 19 appearances with 9 starts and was named Big 12 Newcomer of the Week for the week of November 3. Mautz scored five goals and three assists for 13 points. She recorded a career-high eight points vs. Houston Baptist with a hat-trick, scoring the game winner, and serving two assists. She netted four goals and tallied 10 points in her last two games of the season. As a junior, she started in 20 matches and saw playing time in all 25 of A&M's matches. After ranking second on the team with 66 shots and 27 shots on goal, she scored four goals, three of which came in Big 12 matches, and two assists for 10 points. She was named to the All-Big 12 Conference second team. During her senior season, she was one of only two Aggies to start in all 23 matches and led the offense with 29 points on a team-high and career-high 12 goals and five assists. Mautz was named NSCAA National Player of the Week, Big 12 Player of the Week, and was selected to the TopDrawerSoccer.com Team of the Week, the All-Big 12 first team and the Big 12 All-Tournament team. She recorded her second career hat trick vs. No. 16 Virginia Tech and had a team-high of five game-winning goals.

== Club career ==
=== Sky Blue FC ===
Mautz played in five matches for Sky Blue FC of Women's Professional Soccer during the 2010 season. She made two starts and scored once.

=== Chicago Red Stars (WPSL Elite) ===
After the WPS suspended operations in early 2012, Mautz signed with the Chicago Red Stars in the Women's Premier Soccer League Elite (WPSL Elite). The team won silver in the WPSL Elite national championship.

=== Chicago Red Stars (NWSL) ===
Mautz re-joined the Chicago Red Stars for the inaugural season of the National Women's Soccer League in 2013. She was drafted in the fifth round (36th overall) of the 2013 NWSL Supplemental Draft

On July 30, 2022, Mautz played in her last game as a Chicago Red Star. She was one of only six players to have played all ten years of the NWSL with the same team. She appeared in 143 matches with the Red Stars and scored 16 goals during her career. She retired to accept a job as an assistant coach with her alma mater, Texas A&M.

=== Zorky ===
In September 2013, Mautz was loaned for 2.5 months to Russian Women's Football Championship club Zorky.

=== Perth Glory ===
On October 5, 2016, Mautz joined Australian club Perth Glory as an international player. Mautz went on to make 14 appearances during the 2016–2017 season for the Glory. After an NWSL offseason load to Adelaide during the 2017–2018 season, she resigned a loan agreement for the 2018–2019 season with the Perth Glory.

=== Adelaide United ===
On October 27, 2017, Mautz moved from Perth Glory to join Australian club Adelaide United as an international player. Mautz joined fellow Chicago Red Stars teammates Danielle Colaprico and Katie Naughton for the 2017–18 W-League season.

== International career ==
Mautz was a member of the United States women's national under-20 soccer team that took home gold at the 2008 FIFA U-20 Women's World Cup. She has also played for the U-23 team.

In addition to playing professionally Mautz coaches soccer collegiately and is currently available for private lessons in the O'fallon, MO area.

== Coaching career ==
In 2022, Mautz joined the staff at her alma mater Texas A&M University, where she had previously worked as a student assistant.
