= Katie Schoepfer =

American soccer player (born 1988)

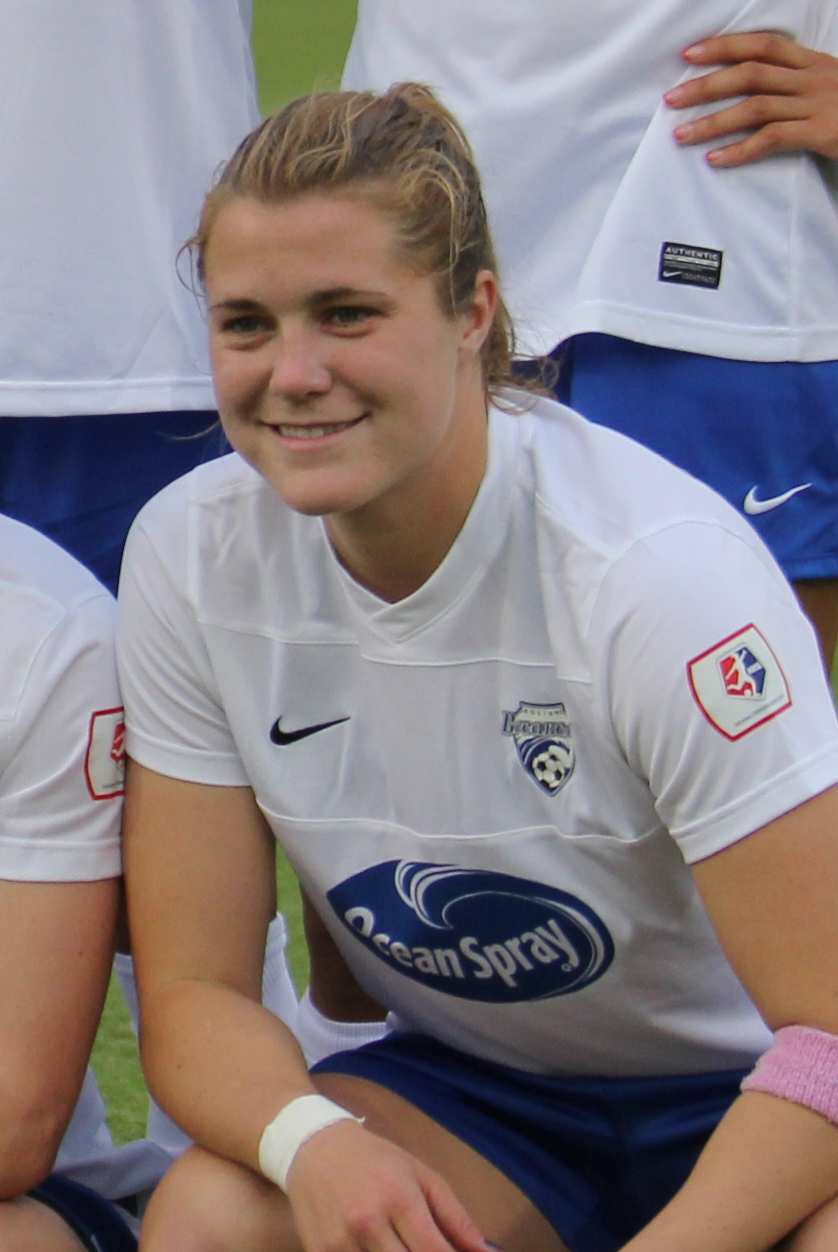
- Schoepfer with the Boston Breakers in 2013

Personal information
- Full name: Kathryn Theresa Schoepfer
- Date of birth: November 10, 1988 (age 37)
- Place of birth: New London, Connecticut, United States
- Height: 5 ft 8 in (1.73 m)
- Position: Forward

Youth career
- 2003–2007: South Central Premier

College career
Years	Team	Apps	(Gls)
2006–2009	Penn State Nittany Lions	92	(48)

Senior career*
Years	Team	Apps	(Gls)
2006	Western Mass Lady Pioneers	12	(14)
2007–2008	SoccerPlus Connecticut		
2010	Sky Blue FC	5	(0)
2011	Boston Breakers (WPS)	13	(2)
2013–2016	Boston Breakers (NWSL)	82	(7)

International career
2008–2010	United States U-23	5	(1)

Managerial career
- 2017–2019: Holy Cross Crusaders (assistant)
- 2021–2023: United States U15
- 2023–2025: United States U17
- 2025–: United States U16
- * Club domestic league appearances and goals

Kathryn Theresa Schoepfer (born November 10, 1988) is an American soccer coach and former professional player who is the head coach of the United States women's national under-17 team. She spent most of her professional career with the Boston Breakers of Women's Professional Soccer and the National Women's Soccer League. She played college soccer for the Penn State Nittany Lions.

== Early life ==
While playing high school soccer at Waterford High School, Schoepfer broke the Connecticut high school state record for goals in a career, finishing with 157. She also ranked second in career assists, totaling 47 in her career. Schoepfer earned Gatorade Connecticut player of the year honors and NSCAA high school All American honors during her career with the Lancers. Schoepfer played the 2006 USL W-League season with the Western Mass Lady Pioneers, recording 14 goals in 12 appearances. She was named the league's U-19 Player of the Year.

=== Penn State Nittany Lions ===
Schoepfer played collegiate soccer for the Penn State Nittany Lions women's soccer team, scoring 48 goals on 92 appearances while helping the team win 4 consecutive Big Ten championships. While at Penn State, Schoepfer was a four-time all Big Ten performer and a two-time NSCAA All-American, earning second team honors in 2007 and third team honors in 2009. Additionally in 2009, Schoepfer was named the Big Ten Offensive Player of the Year, a first team NSCAA Scholar All-American, was a nominee for the Lowe's Senior CLASS Award. and semifinalist for the 2009 Hermann Trophy.

== Playing career ==
=== Club ===
On January 15, 2010, Schoepfer was selected in the third round (26th overall) of the 2010 WPS Draft by Sky Blue FC. Schoepfer made five appearances for Sky Blue during the 2010 season. Before the 2011 season, Schoepfer signed a contract with the Boston Breakers and made her first start against the Atlanta Beat on April 9, 2011. Schoepfer scored her first professional goal and 2011 #5 goal of the year for the WPS in just her third career start during the June 5 game against MagicJack (WPS). Schoepfer netted again against the Atlanta Beat (WPS) on July 10, 2011.

On October 25, 2011, the Breakers announced that they had resigned Schoepfer for the 2012 season. New Breakers head coach Lisa Cole said of the signing, "Shoep is another young player who has a ton of potential...She was able to score important goals for us in limited minutes last season. We're looking for her to have breakout season as well," Cole said. "She can score lot of goals for us this year, something that we were missing last year."

Schoepfer scored in the first ever WPSL Elite match against the ASA Chesapeake Charge on May 10, 2012, scoring the second goal in the 3–0 victory for the Breakers. Schoepfer finished the season with 7 goals and 6 assists. On February 7, 2013 the Breakers drafted Schoepfer with their second pick, the eleventh overall, in the 2013 NWSL Supplemental Draft. On February 18, the Breakers announced Schoepfer had officially signed with the team.

=== International ===
Schoepfer played for the United States U-23 women's national soccer team as well as the United States U-17 women's national soccer team. In 2009, Schoepfer scored nine goals in six games in all competitions for the U-23 team. She made her international debut on May 15, 2009 against the Northern Ireland U-23 national team and scored her first international goal in a 3–1 victory against the England U-23 national team on July 7, 2009.

== Coaching career ==
On November 18, 2021, Schoepfer appointed by the United States Soccer Federation head coach of the United States girls' national under-15 soccer team. After two years with the U.S. girls' U-15 team, Schoepfer transitioned into the head coach role for the United States women's national under-17 soccer team.

== Coaching statistics ==
As of matches played on October 28, 2025.

Coaching record by team and tenure
Team	From	To	Record				
Team	From	To	P	W	D	L	Win %
United States U-15 GNT	Nov 2021	May 2023	7	7	0	0	100.0
United States U-17 WNT	May 2023	November 2025	31	22	4	5	71.0
Total			38	29	4	5	76.3
