= Michele Weissenhofer =

American professional soccer player (born 1987)

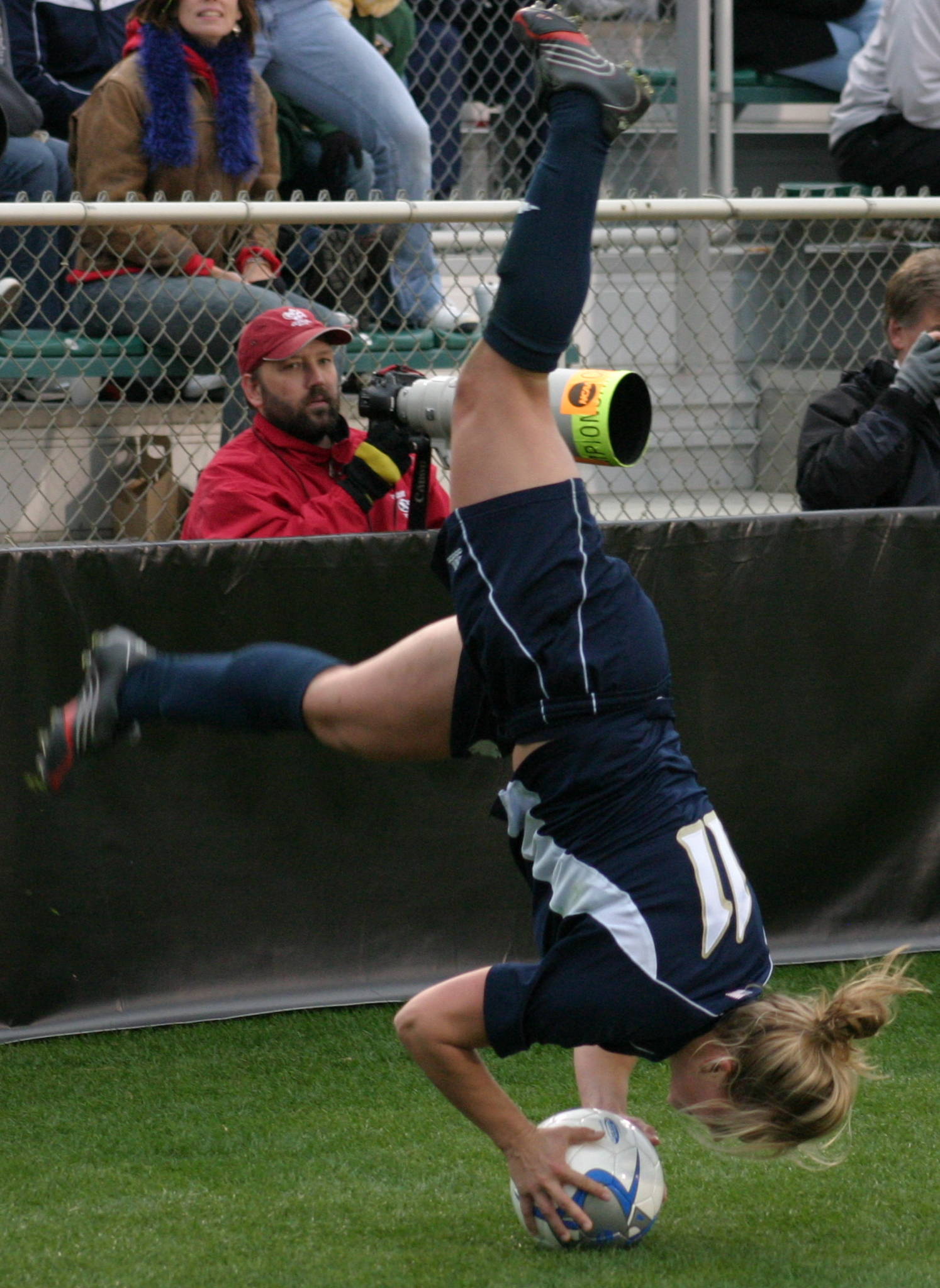
- Weissenhofer attempting a flip throw-in

Personal information
- Full name: Michele Lynn Weissenhofer
- Date of birth: August 18, 1987 (age 39)
- Place of birth: Naperville, Illinois
- Height: 5 ft 4 in (1.63 m)
- Position: Striker

College career
Years	Team	Apps	(Gls)
2006–2009	Notre Dame Fighting Irish		

Senior career*
Years	Team	Apps	(Gls)
2010	Chicago Red Stars		
2010–2011	SGS Essen	20	(2)
2011–2012	Chicago Red Stars		
2014	Chicago Red Stars	1	(0)
- * Club domestic league appearances and goals

Michele Weissenhofer Fumagalli (born August 18, 1987) is a retired American professional soccer player who last played as a striker for the Chicago Red Stars of the National Women's Soccer League (NWSL). She is currently the performance dietitian for Chicago Fire FC in the MLS.

== Early life ==
Weissenhofer was born and raised in Naperville, Illinois. She graduated from Neuqua Valley High School, where in addition to soccer she also played varsity basketball. As a child she participated in gymnastics, which helped her in developing the flip throw-in that became a signature of her soccer career.

Her father played college football and her mother played college softball and was a cheerleader, both at North Central College. Her uncle was a linebacker for the University of Notre Dame.

== Playing career ==
=== High School ===
Choosing to focus on her club career with Eclipse Select Soccer Club, Weissenhofer only played three years of high school soccer at Neuqua Valley High School. In 2005 she won a state title alongside her future college teammates, Brittany Bock and Amanda Clark.

=== College ===
Weissenhofer attended the University of Notre Dame. She was sidelined for portions of her tenure with the Fighting Irish due to injuries, but still notched 90 games-played with 63 starts. During her tenure, Notre Dame won three Big East Conference titles. The team made four consecutive trips to the NCAA College Cup (Weissenhofer and the rest of her senior class were only the second Notre Dame group to achieve this), including making it to the championship game in 2006 and 2008.

=== WPS ===
Weissenhofer was selected by the Chicago Red Stars with the 33rd overall pick in the 2010 WPS Draft. Although she didn't make the first team roster, she was added to the developmental roster.

=== Frauen-Bundesliga ===
In July 2010, Weissenhofer joined SGS Essen to play in the Frauen-Bundesliga. She stayed with the club through March 2011, scoring six goals in twenty-three games.

=== WPSL ===
Weissenhofer rejoined the Chicago Red Stars for their 2011 season after the club had to drop down to the WPSL due to the owners being unable to come up with the funds to play in the 2011 WPS season. She finished the season with nine goals and eight assists. She led the league in assists and finished second for total points. She was named to the All-WPSL First Team. The Red Stars reached the championship game, but they lost 2–1 to the Orange County Waves in extra time. Weissenhofer had the assist on the Red Stars' goal with a flip throw-in.

=== WPSL Elite ===
In 2012, Weissenhofer played for the Red Stars in the first and only season of the WPSL Elite. The Red Stars made it to the championship game, losing on penalties to the WNY Flash.

=== NWSL ===
Weissenhofer was taken by the Portland Thorns in the 2013 NWSL Supplemental Draft, but she did not make the final roster.

In 2014, with five players missing due to national team call-ups, the Chicago Red Stars called-up Weissenhofer as an amateur player for their game against the WNY Flash on June 18. She entered the game in the 76th minute and recorded one shot on goal in a 2–0 loss for the Red Stars.

== Post-playing ==
Using her marketing degree from Notre Dame, Weissenhofer worked for Gatorade. In 2016, she earned a degree in dietetics from Benedictine University. She previously worked for Northwestern Medicine as an outpatient oncology dietitian. She currently works for the Chicago Fire as the Performance Dietician.

== Personal life ==
In 2014, Michele married John Fumagalli. She has two children, a daughter and a son.
