= Brittany Kolmel =

American soccer player (born 1987)

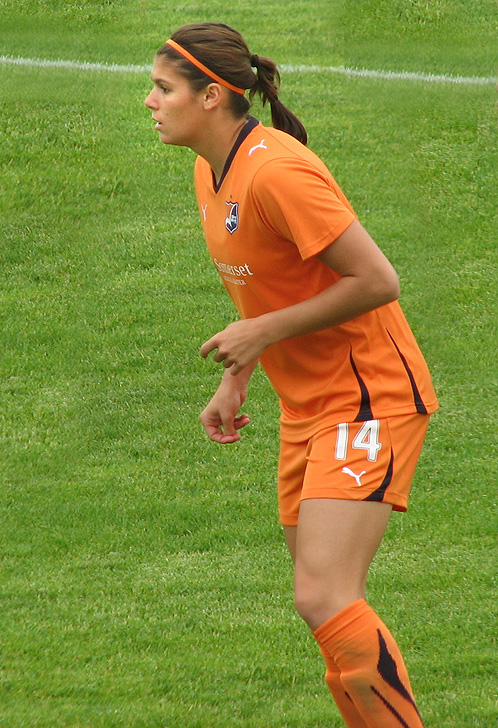
- Taylor with Sky Blue FC in May 2010

Personal information
- Full name: Brittany Nicole Kolmel
- Birth name: Brittany Nicole Taylor
- Date of birth: September 18, 1987 (age 39)
- Place of birth: Campbell Hall, New York, United States
- Height: 5 ft 8 in (1.73 m)
- Position: Defender

Youth career
- North Rockland Lady Storm
- Albertson Express

College career
Years	Team	Apps	(Gls)
2005–2009	Connecticut Huskies	87	(17)

Senior career*
Years	Team	Apps	(Gls)
2009	Hudson Valley Quickstrike; Lady Blues	9	(3)
2010–2011	Sky Blue FC	42	(2)
2012–2013	New York Fury	9	(1)
2013–2015	Western New York Flash	45	(5)
2016–2017	FC Kansas City	43	(0)

International career^{‡}
2006–2007	United States U-20		
2008	United States U-21		
2010–2011	United States	2	(0)

Managerial career
- 2020–2022: Marist Red Foxes
Medal record
Women's association football
Representing United States
Pan American Games
Silver medal – second place	2007 Rio de Janeiro	Team Competition
- * Club domestic league appearances and goals as of October 7, 2017 ‡ National team caps and goals as of February 1, 2011

Brittany Nicole Kolmel (née Taylor; born September 18, 1987) is an American soccer defender. She was traded in 2018 to the Utah Royals FC of the National Women's Soccer League (NWSL), however she decided to take time off from her professional career. She previously played for FC Kansas City and Western New York Flash in the NWSL, for Sky Blue FC in the WPS, and for the United States U-20 women's national soccer team.

== Early life ==
Born in Campbell Hall, New York, Taylor attended Washingtonville High School in Washingtonville, New York, where she was a four-year letterwinner and three-time Section 9 Player of the Year from 2002 to 2004. She was named All-American, Youth All-American and New York State Player of the Year during her senior year. She was named All-East Region 2, All-State and Times Herald-Record Player of the Year from 2002 to 2004 and Striker of the Year in 2003. Taylor set a school record for goals with 127 and goals in a single season at 36.

Taylor also played for club teams, North Rockland Lady Storm and Albertson Express. She was a member of the Region I Olympic Development Program (ODP) team and played for the Under-17 U.S. National team.

=== University of Connecticut ===
Taylor left the University of Connecticut women's soccer team as one of the best players in program history. Taylor was a two-time All-American as a defender in 2007 and 2009 and was named Big East Defender of the Year both of those seasons. In 2006, Taylor was the only player to have scored twice against the University of North Carolina all season. Taylor missed the 2008 season after tearing the ACL and medial meniscus in her right knee while walking on her driveway. Taylor returned in 2009 and was able to help lead the Huskies to the 2009 NCAA Tournament. She scored the match-winning goal in the second overtime of the Huskies' first round match-up against Boston University in the 2009 NCAA Tournament. She was named First Team All-Big East in each of her four seasons at UConn.

== Club career ==
=== Hudson Valley Quickstrike Lady Blues ===
Taylor began her professional career with the Hudson Valley Quickstrike Lady Blues. She was named the USL W-League Defender of the Year and had her number retired by the club. Taylor's older sister, Meghan, a former Binghamton University player, and younger sister, Janelle, a St. Bonaventure University player, also played for Quickstrike FC.

=== Sky Blue FC ===
Taylor was selected during the first round (sixth overall) of the 2010 WPS Draft by Sky Blue FC. She was named a WPS All-Star in her first season for Sky Blue FC.

=== New York Fury ===
After the WPS suspended operations in 2012, Taylor joined the New York Fury in the WPSL Elite.

=== Western New York Flash ===
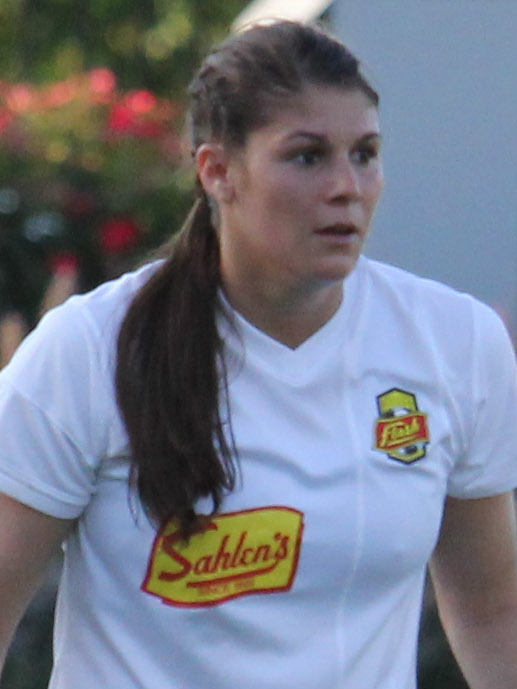
Kolmel with the Flash in 2013

In 2013, Taylor signed with the Western New York Flash for the inaugural season of the National Women's Soccer League. In 2013, she was named to the NWSL Best XI. In the three years she played with the Western New York Flash she missed only three games. During her time with the Flash she recorded five goals and five assists.

=== FC Kansas City ===
Taylor was traded from the Western New York Flash to FC Kansas City in November 2015 in exchange for Rebecca Moros. In her first season with FC Kansas City she played in every minute in all 20 games. On August 13, 2017, she played a full game against the Houston Dash and became the third player in the NWSL to reach 100 caps in the league. She also played the full game in each of her first 100 caps, totaling 9090 minutes in these appearances.

=== Utah Royals FC ===
Taylor carried over to Utah Royals FC when FC Kansas City was sold in November 2017. In 2018, she vacated her roster spot to take a break from professional soccer.

== International career ==
Taylor represented the United States as a member of the U-20 team that took part in the Nordic Cup in the summer of 2006. She was the senior-most member to play for the national team at the 2007 Pan American Games in Brazil. Taylor led a defense which shut down Christine Sinclair and the Canadian team to win a silver medal.

== Coaching career ==
Kolmel was hired as women's soccer head coach at Marist College in June 2020. Kolmel stepped down from her position with Marist in December 2022.

== Personal life ==
She and her husband, Jesse Kolmel, have a daughter named Maui Angelina-Maria and son, Keanu Anthony.

== Honors ==
Western New York Flash

- NWSL Shield: 2013
