= Bianca D'Agostino =

American former soccer player

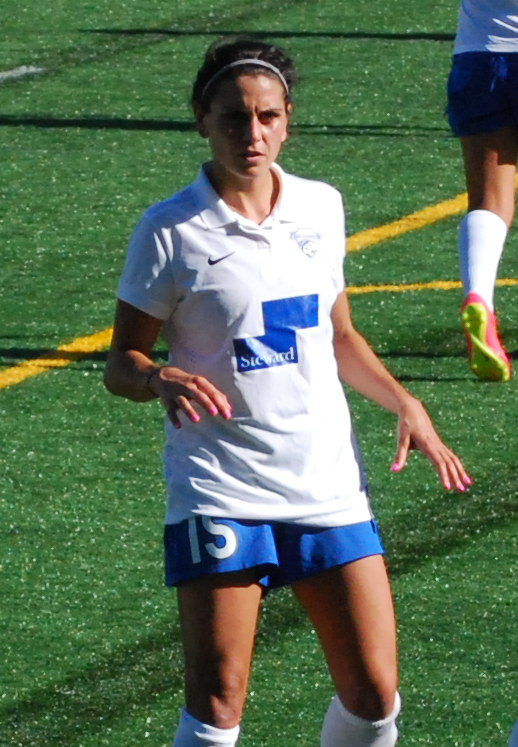

Personal information
- Full name: Bianca Elisa Bogosian
- Birth name: Bianca Elisa D'Agostino
- Date of birth: January 11, 1989 (age 37)
- Place of birth: Longmeadow, Massachusetts, U.S.
- Height: 5 ft 3 in (1.60 m)
- Position: Midfielder

College career
| Years | Team | Apps | (Gls) |
| 2007 | Penn State Nittany Lions | | |
| 2008–2010 | Wake Forest Demon Deacons | | |

Senior career*
| Years | Team | Apps | (Gls) |
| 2011 | Atlanta Beat | 10 | (0) |
| 2012 | Boston Breakers (WPSLE) | | |
| 2014 | Boston Breakers (NWSL) | 16 | (0) |

International career
- United States U-17
- United States U-20
| 2008–2011 | United States U-23 | | |
- * Club domestic league appearances and goals

Bianca Elisa D'Agostino (born January 11, 1989) is an American former soccer player. She most recently played for the Boston Breakers in the National Women's Soccer League and was formerly a member of the United States U-23 women's national soccer team. She previously played for the Atlanta Beat of Women's Professional Soccer.

== Early life ==
D'Agostino grew up in Longmeadow, Massachusetts and played high school soccer at the Loomis Chaffee School where she scored 76 goals with 44 assists in 65 games. She was named a Parade All-American in 2007 and was twice named a NSCAA High School All-American. Following the 2006–2007 season, she was named Connecticut Player of the Year. While on the team, the Loomis Chaffee School won three consecutive Class A New England Championship titles and had two completely undefeated seasons. From 2002 to 2007, D'Agostino was selected for the U-14 and 17 National Team Pools and was a Region I ODP member.

=== Penn State University ===
D'Agostino attended Pennsylvania State University her freshman year where she played in 23 games (including nine starts) and recorded one assist. After transferring to Wake Forest University, D'Agostino was named to the Wake Forest Nike Tournament All-Tournament Team, earned ACC Player of the Week honors (9/16) and was named Soccer America National Team of the Week (9/16) during her sophomore year. During her senior year, Bianca started all 24 games, totalling two goals and nine assists and was named co-captain of the squad. She was also named to ACC/SEC Challenge All-Tournament Team.

== Playing career ==
=== Club ===
D'Agostino was drafted 18th overall by the Philadelphia Independence in the 2011 WPS Draft and later traded to the Atlanta Beat. During the 2010 season, she played in 10 matches (with 5 starts) for the Atlanta, logging 418 minutes.

After the WPS suspended operations in early 2012, D'Agostino signed with the Boston Breakers in the Women's Premier Soccer League Elite in May of the same year. She played in 13 matches for the team and scored one goal during the season.

The following year, a new professional league, the National Women's Soccer League was established and D'Agostino was signed by the Breakers in the NWSL Supplemental Draft. She was the team's third pick, 27th overall. On April 9, 2013, Boston Breakers announced that D'Agostino had sustained a partially torn ACL and would miss a portion of the season. She returned for the 2014 National Women's Soccer League season making 16 appearances including six starts.

On September 16, 2014, D'Agostino announced her retirement from professional soccer.

=== International ===
In July 2008, D'Agostino was selected to travel to England with the United States women's national under-23 soccer team. The team won the 2011 Four Nations Tournament in La Manga, Spain

== Personal life ==
D'Agostino is married to Zach Bogosian, an ice hockey player with the Minnesota Wild. The pair married in August 2015. They met in Winnipeg.
