= Philadelphia Fever (WPSL) =

- Full name: Philadelphia Fever
- Founded: 2012
- Ground: Total Turf Experience, Pitman, NJ
- Owner: Matt Driver
- Head coach: Chris McKenna; Assistant coach: Maddie Gregory
- League: Women's Premier Soccer League Elite (2012), Women's Premier Soccer League Tri-State Division (2013); Women's Arena Soccer League (2017)
Home colors	Away colors

Philadelphia Fever was an American women's soccer club that last played in the Women's Arena Soccer League (WASL). The club was founded in 2012 and joined the semi-professional Women's Premier Soccer League Elite (WPSL Elite) for its only season before returning to the amateur WPSL for the 2013 WPSL season.

After disbanding for 2014 and 2015, the Fever returned in the summer of 2016 as a developmental team playing exhibition matches, then joined the WASL in 2017. The Fever and WASL shared ownership with men's side Philadelphia Fury, which competed in the corresponding American Soccer League (ASL). Both leagues ceased play after the 2017 season.

The Philadelphia Fever, along with AC Crusaders and Philadelphia Fury soccer clubs, were part of the Atlantic Soccer Factory organization.

== Year-by-year ==
Year	Division	League	GP	W	L	T	GF	GA	GD	Pts	Reg. season	Playoffs
2012	1	WPSLE	14	2	9	3	15	35	-20	9	6th	Did not qualify
2013	2	WPSL	10	8	0	2	36	5	+31	26	1st, South Atlantic	East Conf. Final
2014	hiatus											
2015	hiatus											
2017	1	WASL										
