= Lauren Fowlkes =

American soccer player

Personal information
- Full name: Lauren Ann Fowlkes
- Date of birth: July 6, 1988 (age 38)
- Place of birth: Kansas City, Missouri, United States
- Height: 5 ft 10 in (1.78 m)
- Positions: Forward; defender

Youth career
- 1999–2007: KC Dynamos
- 2004: KCFC Alliance Pumas
- 2005: J.B. Marine S.C.

College career
Years	Team	Apps	(Gls)
2007–2010	Notre Dame Fighting Irish	95	(17)

Senior career*
Years	Team	Apps	(Gls)
2010	Pali Blues	3	(1)
2011–2012	Philadelphia Independence		
2013	Chicago Red Stars	4	(0)

International career
2004	United States U-17		
2008	United States U-20	17	(0)
2009	United States U-23	5	(1)
- * Club domestic league appearances and goals as of August 22, 2013

Lauren Ann Fowlkes (born July 6, 1988) is a retired American soccer player from Lee's Summit, Missouri. She was a defender for the United States women's national under-23 soccer team and the Chicago Red Stars of National Women's Soccer League.

== Career ==
=== Collegiate career ===
Originally brought to Notre Dame as a midfielder, Fowlkes also had a brief stint at forward for the Fighting Irish during her freshman year, until she was moved to defender for the rest of the 2007 season. Under the mentorship of Carrie Dew, Fowlkes started twenty games for Notre Dame as central defender, and led the team in minutes played (2,324 minutes) during 2007.

Fowlkes was expected to move back into the midfield in 2008, but mostly remained as part of the defense. As a sophomore, she did not start as many games as she had her freshman year, as she was absent for part of the 2008 season and Notre Dame's entire NCAA postseason due to national team commitments. Notre Dame lost to North Carolina, 1–2, in the 2008 College Cup, on the same day Fowlkes and the United States women's national under-20 soccer team defeated North Korea, 2–1, to win the 2008 FIFA U-20 Women's World Cup.

Upon Dew's graduation in 2009, defender Jessica Schuveiller assumed Dew's role at center back and Fowlkes moved to the defensive midfielder position. Several games into the 2009 season, however, Fowlkes returned to the striker position, a position she had not played since her freshman year, scoring ten goals and four assists.

Fowlkes was named co-captain of the Fighting Irish in 2010, and returned to the center back position alongside Schuveiller; however, she was moved back to midfield and the striker position after the Irish lost to Connecticut in October 2010. Referred to as a "Swiss Army knife" because of her versatility, Fowlkes was in midfield when Notre Dame won its third NCAA national championship, defeating Stanford 1–0. When Fowlkes graduated, she was just the 3rd women's soccer player, and 13th student-athlete in Notre Dame's history to be named an All-American twice on the field and in the classroom.

=== Professional career ===
On January 14, 2011, Fowlkes was drafted fifth overall in the 2011 WPS Draft by the Philadelphia Independence.

In February 2013 she joined Chicago Red Stars in the new National Women's Soccer League. On May 25, 2013, Fowlkes retired from soccer.

=== National team career ===
Fowlkes was a member of the United States women's national under-20 soccer team that won the 2008 FIFA U-20 Women's World Cup in Chile. Along with fellow central defender Nikki Marshall, Fowlkes played every minute of the United States' six matches; she was named the United States' player of the match in the semifinal against Germany. Fowlkes, Marshall, and goalkeeper Alyssa Naeher led the strongest defensive unit of the competition, only ceding three goals in the entire tournament.

Fowlkes was in the United States women's national under-23 soccer team player pool.

== Personal life ==
After retiring from soccer in 2013, she began working as an anesthesia technician before attending Physician Assistant School at Northwestern University.

As of 2020, she was working at Saint Luke's Hospital of Kansas City as a physician assistant.
