= Omolyn Davis =

Jamaican footballer (born 1987)

Personal information
- Full name: Omolyn Ophilia Davis
- Date of birth: 9 August 1987 (age 39)
- Place of birth: Kingston, Jamaica
- Height: 5 ft 8 in (1.73 m)
- Position: Central midfielder

College career
Years	Team	Apps	(Gls)
2006–2007	Lindsey Wilson Blue Raiders	48	(23)
2009–2010	George Mason Patriots		

Senior career*
Years	Team	Apps	(Gls)
2007	FC Indiana		
2008	Fredericksburg Lady Gunners		
2010	Washington Freedom Futures	12	(7)
2011	magicJack	6	(1)
2012	Energiya Voronezh	1	(0)
2012	Western New York Flash		
2013	CSHVSM Kairat	11	(10)

International career^{‡}
2006–2014	Jamaica		
- * Club domestic league appearances and goals as of 12:00, 31 December 2013 (UTC) ‡ National team caps and goals as of 12:00, 25 July 2011 (UTC)

Omolyn Ophilia Davis (born 9 August 1987) is a Jamaican international football defender who last played professionally for CSHVSM of the Kazakhstani championship. She previously played for magicJack in the WPS.

She played the 2013 season for CSHVSM Kairat in Kazakhstan and became a league runner-up.
