= New York Fury =

- Full name: New York Fury
- Founded: 2011
- Ground: James M. Shuart Stadium at Hofstra University
- Capacity: 15,000
- Manager: (United States) Thomas DeBonis
- Coach: (United Kingdom) Paul Riley
- League: Women's Premier Soccer League Elite
Home colors	Away colors

New York Fury was a semi-professional American women's soccer club playing in the Women's Premier Soccer League Elite, the top tier of women's soccer in the United States in 2012. It was part of the Fury Soccer Organization which also supports the Long Island Fury. The club, founded in 2011, was a member of Women's Premier Soccer League and in 2012 joined the newly formed Women's Premier Soccer League Elite.

== History ==
Following the suspension of Women's Professional Soccer (WPS) in late 2011, it was announced that former Philadelphia Independence coach Paul Riley would lead the New York Fury comprising players he called the "WPS Supergroup". In March 2012, the team joined the WPSL Elite competing against three teams who previously played in the WPS: Boston Breakers, Chicago Red Stars, and Western New York Flash.

In August 2012, a new top-tier professional league, the National Women's Soccer League (NWSL) was announced. Many of the Fury players went on to play on teams within the league during its inaugural season. Riley was named head coach of the Portland Thorns in 2014 and recruited many of his former players.

== Players ==
=== 2012 roster ===
Note: Flags indicate national team as defined under FIFA eligibility rules; some limited exceptions apply. Players may hold more than one non-FIFA nationality.

No.	Pos.	Nation	Player
1	GK	USA	Michelle Betos
2	MF	USA	Karin Simonian
3	FW	USA	Jasmyne Spencer
—	MF	USA	Tobin Heath
5	MF	USA	Tina DiMartino
6	DF	USA	Kim Yokers
7	DF	USA	Leigh Ann Robinson
10	MF	USA	Allie Long
11	DF	USA	Jazmyne Avant

No.	Pos.	Nation	Player
12	FW	USA	Gina DiMartino
13	DF	USA	Brittany Taylor
14	DF	USA	Cari Roccaro
15	DF	POL	Nikki Krzysik
16	FW	USA	Kia McNeill
17	MF	USA	Sinead Farrelly
18	GK	MEX	Bianca Henninger
19	FW	USA	Casey Nogueira

== Coaches ==
- Head Coach: Paul Riley
- Assistant Coach: Skip Thorp
