= ASA Chesapeake Charge =

- Full name: ASA Chesapeake Charge
- Nickname: Charge
- Founded: 2010
- Manager: Patrick Crawford
- Website: https://web.archive.org/web/20161004115254/http://www.asacharge.com
Home colors	Away colors

ASA Chesapeake Charge is an amateur, American women's soccer club that played in the Women's Premier Soccer League, the second level of women's soccer in the United States founded in 2010. It also participated in the Women's Premier Soccer League Elite in 2012, the league's lone season. It played its home games in various stadiums, mostly on high-school and college grounds, in the Chesapeake Bay area, and in the state of Maryland. Patrick Crawford is the manager of the club.

== Year-by-Year ==
Year	Division	League	GP	W	L	T	GF	GA	GD	Pts	Reg. season	Playoffs
2010	2	WPSL	10	4	3	3	13	7	+6	15	3rd, Mid-Atlantic	Did not qualify
2011	2	WPSL	10	5	1	4	13	12	+1	19	3rd, Mid-Atlantic	East Conf. Final
2012	1	WPSLE	14	2	9	3	15	35	-20	9	6th	Did not qualify
2013	2	WPSL	10	8	0	2	36	5	+31	26	1st, South Atlantic	East Conf. Final
2014	2	WPSL	10	9	1	0	30	3	+27	27	1st, South Atlantic	East Conf. Semi-final
2015	2	WPSL	8	7	0	1	34	8	+26	22	1st, South Atlantic	Did not participate

== Players ==
The team roster consists of amateur, NCAA-compliant, players who also play in collegiate and high school leagues.

== Honors ==
- Women's Premier Soccer League
  - Divisional champions: 2013, 2014, 2015
  - Conference runners-up: 2011, 2013
- Women's Amateur: 2013
- Women's Open runners-up: 2014, 2015
