= Boston Breakers =

Soccer team

- Nickname: Breakers
- Founded: September 4, 2007; 19 years ago
- Dissolved: January 28, 2018; 8 years ago
- Stadium: Jordan Field
- Capacity: 4,100 (seated)
- Owner(s): Boston Women’s Soccer, LLC
- League: National Women's Soccer League
- Website: http://www.bostonbreakerssoccer.com
Home colors	Away colors

The Boston Breakers were an American professional women's soccer club based in the Greater Boston area that played from 2009 to 2017. The team competed as the Boston area's professional women's soccer team in several leagues culminating in the National Women's Soccer League (NWSL). They were succeeded by Boston Legacy FC, which began play in 2026.

The Breakers played their home games at Jordan Field in Boston and were managed in their final season by Matt Beard.

== History ==
=== Original franchise ===
The original Boston Breakers played in the WUSA from 2001 to 2003. In the final season in the WUSA, the Breakers had their best record (10–4–7) and placed first in the regular season before losing to the Washington Freedom in the semifinals.

=== Women's Professional Soccer ===
==== Re-establishment (2007–2009) ====
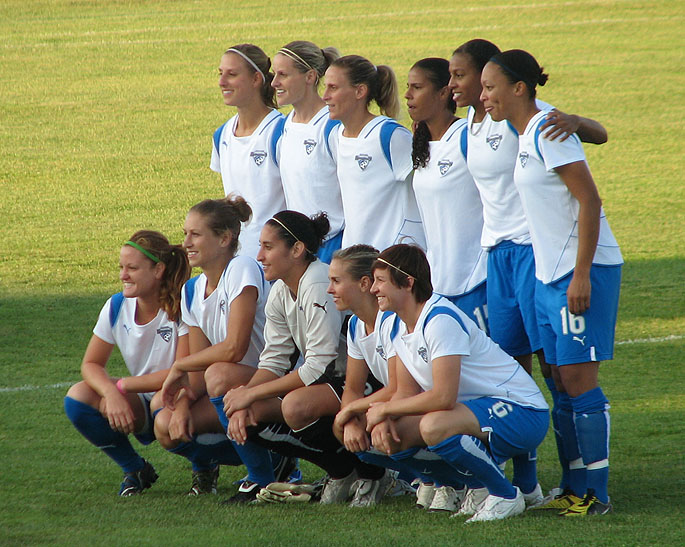
Boston Breakers, 2009

The formation of Women's Professional Soccer was announced on September 4, 2007, during which time it was also announced that a franchise had been awarded to Boston.

The Boston Breakers franchise was officially unveiled on October 26, 2008. At the time it was the only professional women's sports team in Massachusetts. Joe Cummings was named the President and General Manager and he had previously worked for the Breakers franchise in the WUSA. In September 2007, Tony DiCicco was appointed as the club's first head coach.

During the WPS national team player allocation on September 16, 2008, the Breakers acquired Heather Mitts and former Breakers players Kristine Lilly and Angela Hucles. The club acquired Amy Rodriguez as the first overall pick in the 2009 WPS Soccer Draft in St. Louis on January 30, 2009.

==== 2009 season ====
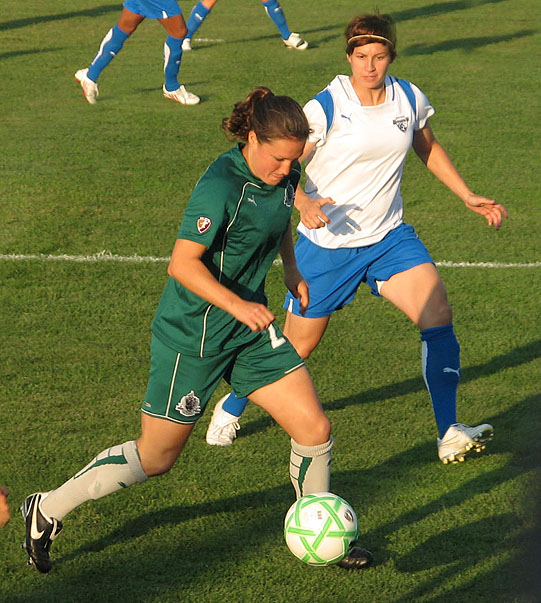
Boston Breaker, Amy LePeilbet, defends against the Saint Louis Athletica

The Breakers played their debut match in the inaugural season of Women's Professional Soccer against FC Gold Pride in Santa Clara, California, losing 2–1. Its first home match was against St. Louis Athletica on April 11, 2009, in which the Breakers lost 2–0. The Breakers finished the season in fifth place with a 7–9–4 record.

==== 2012 league suspension ====
On January 16, 2012, the Breakers announced that they signed United States U-23 national team defender, Bianca D'Agostino. The Breakers also acquired Australian national team forward Kyah Simon in anticipation of the 2012 season. Simon scored two goals against Norway in the 2011 World Cup, which advanced Australia to the quarter-finals. Her goals made her the first Aboriginal player to score a goal in a World Cup tournament.

The league announced on January 30, 2012, that it had suspended the 2012 season. On February 9, 2012, the club announced it would compete in the newly formed WPSL Elite for the 2012 season, with the expectation that it would rejoin the WPS for the 2013 season. The semi-pro league had no restrictions on whether players were professional or amateur.

After the WPS season was suspended, goalkeeper Alyssa Naeher returned to her former club, Turbine Potsdam, after playing for the Breakers during the 2010 and 2011 seasons.

=== Women's Premier Soccer League Elite ===
In 2012, the Boston Breakers competed in the Women's Premier Soccer League Elite. The team finished in first place clinching the regular season title with an 11–3–0 record, the best season in the franchise history. They lost 3–1 against the Chicago Red Stars in the WPSL Elite semifinals. The team was coached by Lisa Cole.

=== National Women's Soccer League ===
In November 2012, it was announced that the Breakers would be one of eight teams in a new women's professional soccer league sponsored by the United States Soccer Federation, the Canadian Soccer Association and the Mexican Football Federation. On January 11, 2013, the league held its player allocation for the national team players, with Boston receiving seven players, including two returning former Breakers Heather O'Reilly and Heather Mitts. The other players assigned to the Breakers were Anisa Guajardo, Adriana Leon, Sydney Leroux, Cecilia Santiago, and Rhian Wilkinson.

==== 2013 season ====
The 2013 Boston Breakers season was the club's eighth overall year of existence, fourth consecutive year, and first year as a member of the National Women's Soccer League. They played 22 games, finishing with 8 wins, 6 draws, and 8 losses. They did not qualify for the post-season playoffs, and finished the season at fifth place in an eight team league.

==== 2014 season ====
The 2014 Boston Breakers season was the club's ninth overall year of existence, fifth consecutive year, and second year as a member of the National Women's Soccer League. They played 24 games, finishing with 6 wins, 2 draws, and 16 losses. They did not qualify for the post-season playoffs, and finished the season at eighth place in a nine team league.

==== 2015 season ====
The 2015 Boston Breakers season, was the club's tenth overall year of existence, sixth consecutive year, and third year as a member of the National Women's Soccer League. They played 20 games, finishing with 4 wins, 3 draws, and 13 losses. They did not qualify for the post-season playoffs, and finished the season at ninth place in a nine team league.

==== 2016 season ====
The 2016 Boston Breakers season was the club's eleventh overall year of existence, seventh consecutive year, and fourth year as a member of the National Women's Soccer League. They played 20 games, finishing with 3 wins, 2 draws, and 15 losses. They did not qualify for the post-season playoffs, and finished the season at tenth place in a ten-team league.

==== 2017 season ====
The 2017 Boston Breakers season was the club's twelfth overall year of existence, eighth consecutive year, and fifth year as a member of the National Women's Soccer League. They played 24 games, finishing with 4 wins, 7 draws, and 13 losses. They did not qualify for the post-season playoffs, and finished the season in ninth place of a ten-team league.

==== 2018 ====
After failed last-minute attempts to sell the club to the owners of the New England Revolution and to local commercial real estate developers, the Boston Breakers officially folded on January 25, 2018 and did not participate in the NWSL in 2018. Reports generally blamed lack of marketing and resultant limited fanbase for the club's demise.

==== Successor team ====
In September 2023, the NWSL announced that Boston would be awarded an expansion franchise, later named Boston Legacy FC, to start play in 2026.

== Stadium ==
=== Jordan Field (2014–2017) ===
The Boston Breakers played their home games for their final four seasons at Jordan Field, a 4,100 seat, multi-purpose facility located on the campus of Harvard University in Allston, Massachusetts. Jordan Field was formerly known as Soldiers Field Soccer Stadium.

=== Dilboy Stadium (2012–2013) ===
The Breakers played at Dilboy Stadium in the Boston suburb of Somerville, Massachusetts for their 2012 and 2013 seasons, the move from Harvard to Dilboy concurrent with their league move to the WPSL Elite.

=== Harvard Stadium (2009–2011) ===
Boston used Harvard Stadium, the 30,323 seat home football stadium of the Harvard Crimson, from 2009 through 2011. In 2012, shortly after joining the newly created Women's Premier Soccer League Elite, the Breakers moved their home field to Jordan Field.

== Broadcasting ==
As of 2017, Boston Breakers games were streamed exclusively by Go90 for American audiences and via the NWSL website for international viewers. As part of a three-year agreement with A&E Networks, Lifetime broadcasts one NWSL Game of the Week on Saturday afternoons. The Breakers were featured in the nationally televised Game of the Week on September 2, 2017.

Previous seasons' games were broadcast on YouTube, MediaBoss Television, ESPN, and Fox Sports.

== Supporters ==
The team had an official supporters group called the Boston Armada as well as an independent supporters group called the Riptide, who cheered from a standing section known as "The Dock".

== Players and coaches ==
=== Final roster ===
As of November 1, 2017

No.	Position	Nation	Nation
2	DF	CAN	Allysha Chapman
3	DF	USA	Brooke Elby
4	DF	USA	Megan Oyster
7	DF	SWE	Lotta Ökvist
8	DF	USA	Julie King
9	FW	ENG	Natasha Dowie
10	MF	NZL	Rosie White
11	MF	USA	Rose Lavelle
14	GK	USA	Abby Smith
15	GK	USA	Sammy Jo Prudhomme
17	DF	USA	Amanda Frisbie
18	FW	USA	Tiffany Weimer
19	FW	CAN	Adriana Leon
20	DF	USA	Christen Westphal
21	FW	USA	Midge Purce
22	FW	USA	Ifeoma Onumonu
23	FW	USA	Katie Stengel
25	MF	USA	Morgan Andrews
26	MF	USA	Angela Salem
33	FW	USA	Hayley Dowd

=== Head coaches ===
- (England) Matt Beard (2016–2017)
- (United States) Tom Durkin (2014–2015)
- (United States) Cat Whitehill (2013) (interim)
- (United States) Lisa Cole (2012–2013)
- (United States) Tony DiCicco (2009–2011)

== Ownership and team management ==
Michael Stoller was the managing partner of Boston Women's Soccer, LLC, the ownership group overseeing the Breakers.

== Records and statistics ==
All-time results by season
Year	League	Pos.	Playoffs	W	L	D	Pts.	GF	GA	Home	Away
2009	WPS	5th	did not qualify	7	9	4	25	18	20	4–3–3	3–6–1
2010	WPS	2nd	Super Semifinal	10	8	6	36	36	28	5–6–1	5–2–5
2011	WPS	4th	First Round	5	9	4	19	19	24	4–3–2	1–6–2
2012	WPSLE	1st	First Round	11	3	0	33	28	9	6–1–0	5–2–0
2013	NWSL	5th	Did not qualify	8	8	6	30	35	34	5–3–3	3–5–3
2014	NWSL	8th	Did not qualify	6	16	2	20	37	53	5–7–0	1–9–2
2015	NWSL	9th	Did not qualify	4	13	3	15	22	43	4–5–1	0–8–2
2016	NWSL	10th	Did not qualify	3	15	2	11	14	47	2–6–2	1–9–0
2017	NWSL	9th	Did not qualify	4	13	7	19	24	35	3–6–3	1–7–4

== Honors ==
=== Individual player awards ===
- Amy LePeilbet, WPS 2009, 2010 Defender of the Year

==== Player of the Week ====
Year	League	Week	Player	Ref
2009	WPS	Week 3	(England) Kelly Santiago	
2010	WPS	Week 17	(England) Kelly Smith	
2011	WPS	Week 9	(United States) Meghan Klingenberg	
2011	WPS	Week 10	(United States) Alyssa Naeher	
2011	WPS	Week 18	(United States) Kiki Santiago	
2013	NWSL	Week 3	(United States) Heather O'Reilly	
2013	NWSL	Week 4	(United States) Sydney Leroux	
2013	NWSL	Week 7	(England) Lianne Sanderson	
2013	NWSL	Week 13	(United States) Sydney Leroux	
2015	NWSL	Week 17	(United States) Alyssa Naeher	
2017	NWSL	Week 3	(Canada) Adriana Leon	
2017	NWSL	Week 21	(Canada) Adriana Leon	

==== Player of the Month ====
Month	League	Player	Ref
April 2009	WPS	(England) Kelly Smith	
July 2010	WPS	(United States) Jordan Angeli	
August 2010	WPS	(England) Kelly Smith	
April 2017	NWSL	(United States) Rose Lavelle	

=== Pillars of Excellence ===
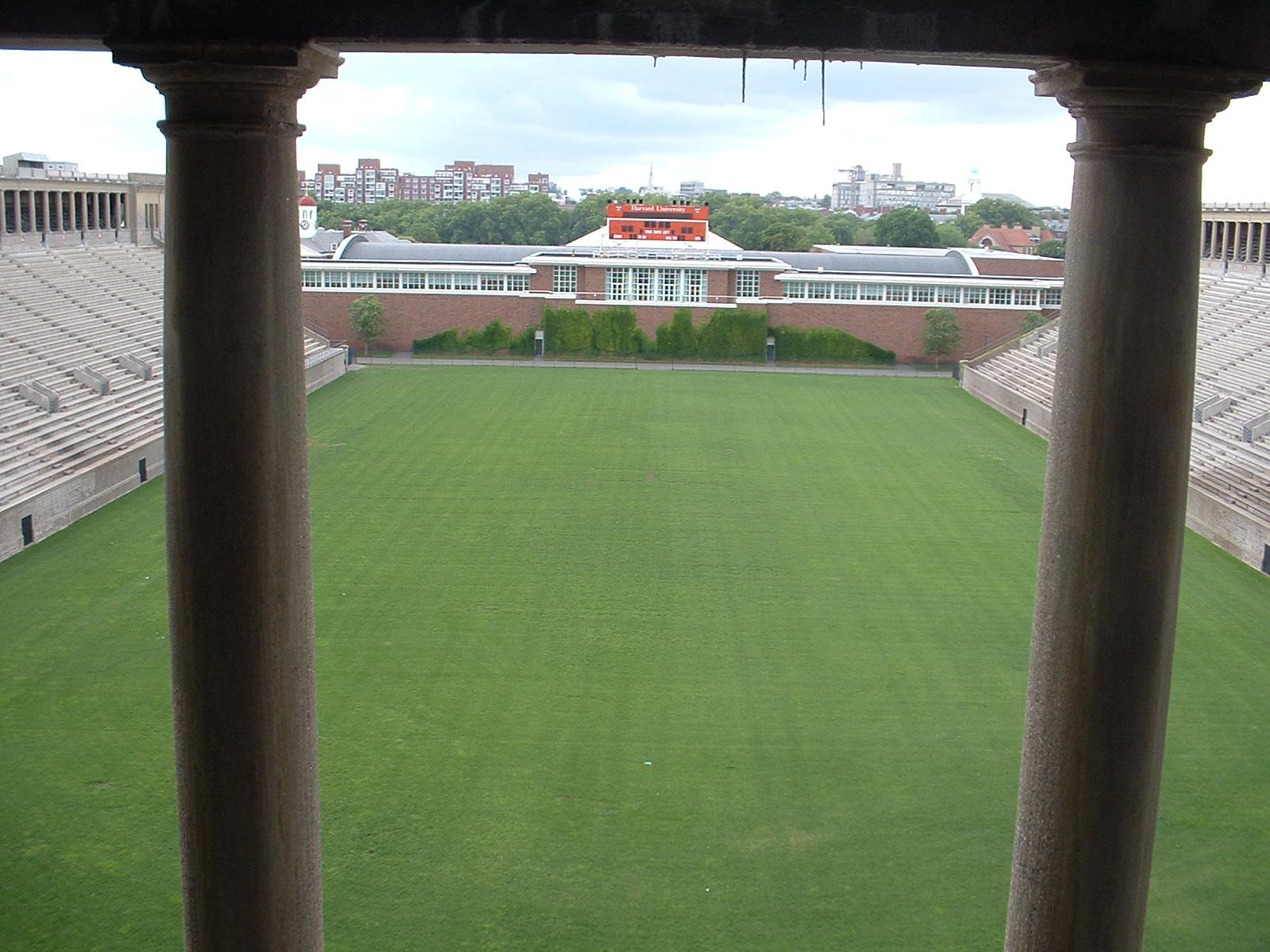
Two pillars at the southern part of the colonnade at Harvard Stadium

In summer 2009, the Breakers began a tradition of honoring legends from the past with commemorative banners at Harvard Stadium. The award's Pillars of Excellence name was influenced by the stadium's iconic colonnade. Players from both Boston Breakers (WUSA) and the WPS/WPSL Elite/NWSL entry are considered.

Maren Meinert became the first inductee during a halftime ceremony on May 17, 2009 when the Breakers hosted the Washington Freedom. During her final season in 2003 Meinert was named the WUSA's Most Valuable Player for the regular season and MVP of the WUSA All-Star Game. Angela Hucles was inducted on May 1, 2010 during a home game against the Chicago Red Stars. Kristine Lilly was inducted during halftime of a match against the Philadelphia Independence May 23, 2011. Leslie Osborne was inducted during halftime of a home game against Sky Blue FC.

Inducted	Player	Position	League	Years
May 22, 2015	(United States) Leslie Osborne	Midfielder	WPS/WPSL Elite	2010–12
May 23, 2011	(United States) Kristine Lilly	Midfielder/Forward	WUSA/WPS	2001–03, 2009–10
May 1, 2010	(United States) Angela Hucles	Midfielder	WUSA/WPS	2001–03, 2009
May 17, 2009	(Germany) Maren Meinert	Midfielder/Forward	WUSA	2001–03

=== Supporters Award ===
In 2017 the official supporters group of the Boston Breakers, The Boston Armada, began a tradition of awarding one player at each home game with a supporters award. Officially dubbed "The Chunk Award", it recognized a player's individual contribution to the team during the match. The trophy for 2017 represented the unofficial mascot of the Boston Breakers, "Chunk", a bulldog owned by Boston Breakers Academy head coach Lee Billard.

== See also ==
- List of top-division football clubs in CONCACAF countries
- List of professional sports teams in the United States and Canada
- Boston Breakers (WUSA)
