= Women's Premier Soccer League Elite =

WPSL Elite
- Founded: 2012
- Folded: 2013
- Country: United States
- Confederation: CONCACAF (North America)
- Number of clubs: 8
- Level on pyramid: 1
- Relegation to: None
- Website: Official site
- Current: 2012 WPSL Elite Season

The Women's Premier Soccer League Elite (WPSL Elite) was a women's semi-professional soccer league created by the Women's Premier Soccer League (WPSL) to support the sport in the United States, both from continued interest by WPSL teams in professionalism and as a response to the suspension (and ultimate demise) of the WPS.

== History ==
=== Inaugural season ===
For the 2012 season, the league featured former WPS teams, Boston Breakers, Chicago Red Stars, and Western New York Flash, in addition to many WPSL teams primarily located in the northeast and midwest regions of the United States. Six of the eight teams were considered fully professional though the actual status of several teams has been disputed. Western WPSL teams were expected to join the Elite League starting in 2013.

WPSL Elite Champions
Season	Champion	Coach	Runner-up
2012	Western New York Flash	(New Zealand) Aaran Lines	Chicago Red Stars

==== 2012 Teams ====
Team	Home	Pro-am	Joined	Founded	Previous leagues
ASA Chesapeake Charge	Multiple locales in MD.	NCAA compliant	2012	2012	WPSL
Boston Breakers	Somerville, Massachusetts	professional	2012	2008	WPS
Chicago Red Stars	Lisle, Illinois	disputed	2012	2007	WPS, WPSL
FC Indiana Lionesses	Indianapolis, Indiana	professional	2012	2000	W-League, WPSL
New England Mutiny	Agawam, Massachusetts	disputed	2012	1999	WPSL
New York Fury	Hempstead, New York	professional	2012	2011	WPSL
Philadelphia Fever	Multiple locales in N.J. & PA.	NCAA compliant	2012	2012	none
Western New York Flash	Rochester, New York	professional	2012	2008	WPS

=== League expansion ===
Before the announcement of the formation of the National Women's Soccer League (NWSL), a Western conference of the league was planned to begin competition in 2013. Five teams - the San Diego WFC SeaLions, the Los Angeles Vikings, the California Storm, the Bay Area Breeze, and an unnamed team from Seattle - were reportedly committed to joining. Three other cities - Phoenix, Dallas, and Houston - had also voiced interest in joining WPSLE.

=== Hiatus ===
The Boston Breakers, Chicago Red Stars and Western New York Flash joined the NWSL for the 2013 season. Also, the New England Mutiny, New York Fury, and Philadelphia Fever opted to return to the WPSL.

Originally, it was leaked that five teams were slated to join the ASA Chesapeake Charge and FC Indiana in the 2013 of WPSL Elite. Later, the WPSL Elite website revealed six teams - the Charge, FC Indiana, the California Storm, the Houston Aces, Jersey Sky Blues, and the San Diego SeaLions - would take place in the "WPSL Elite League Cup", a series of games played in addition to regular WPSL games; the Houston Aces even had these games on the schedule page of their website. However, organization apparently fell through, and the WPSL-Elite was ultimately disbanded.

Of the six teams, two (Indiana and Jersey) did not rejoin WPSL for the 2013 season. The other four all won their respective divisions and made it to their regions' respective finals (as did the New England Mutiny). There were unfulfilled plans to revive the WPSL Elite for the 2014 season.

=== Possible revival ===
Before the 2015 WPSL season, the Real Salt Lake Women advertised that they would be participating in a 12-team WPSL Elite with 10 regular season games per team. Like the suggested WPSL Elite season suggested by the Houston Aces in 2013, though, the season did not appear to materialize. However, after the regular WPSL playoffs, a WPSL Elite Final was played between RSL Women and the San Francisco Nighthawks, which was hosted and won by RSL. No official qualification to the match was ever announced, and the match score was not published on the WPSL site for weeks. Further talk of officially reviving the WPSL Elite has continued in the wake of the folding of the W-League in the fall of 2015, though signs point to both Zanelli and a majority of WPSL teams against the idea of a tiered WPSL. RSL and Houston would join the newly formed United Women's Soccer before the beginning of its inaugural 2016 season, joining former WPSLE member the Mutiny in the new league. FC Indiana similarly joined UWS the following year.

== Organization ==
=== Playing structure ===
The Elite League featured a standard home-and-away double round robin format, with a separate postseason from the regular WPSL playoffs. The Elite League's playoffs involved four teams in two-leg aggregate series.
