= 2011 Western New York Flash season =

Western New York Flash
2011 season
- Owner: (United States) Joe Sahlen
- Head coach: (New Zealand) Aaran Lines
- Stadium: Sahlen's Stadium; Rochester, New York (Capacity: 13,768)
- Women's Professional Soccer: 1st
- WPS Playoffs: Champions
- Top goalscorer: Marta, Christine Sinclair (10)
- Highest home attendance: 15,404 (July 20 vs. magicJack)
- Lowest home attendance: 1,372 (May 13 vs. Boston)
- Average home league attendance: 4,881
- Biggest win: 4-1 (July 30 vs. Sky Blue FC)
- Biggest defeat: 0-2 (July 17 at Sky Blue FC, Aug. 6 at Atlanta)
Home colors	Away colors
- All statistics correct as of June 13, 2017.

The 2011 Western New York Flash season was the team's inaugural and only season in the Women's Professional Soccer league, after competing as the Buffalo Flash in the USL W-League. The Western New York Flash won the league, then went on to win the 2011 WPS championship over the Philadelphia Independence.

== Review ==
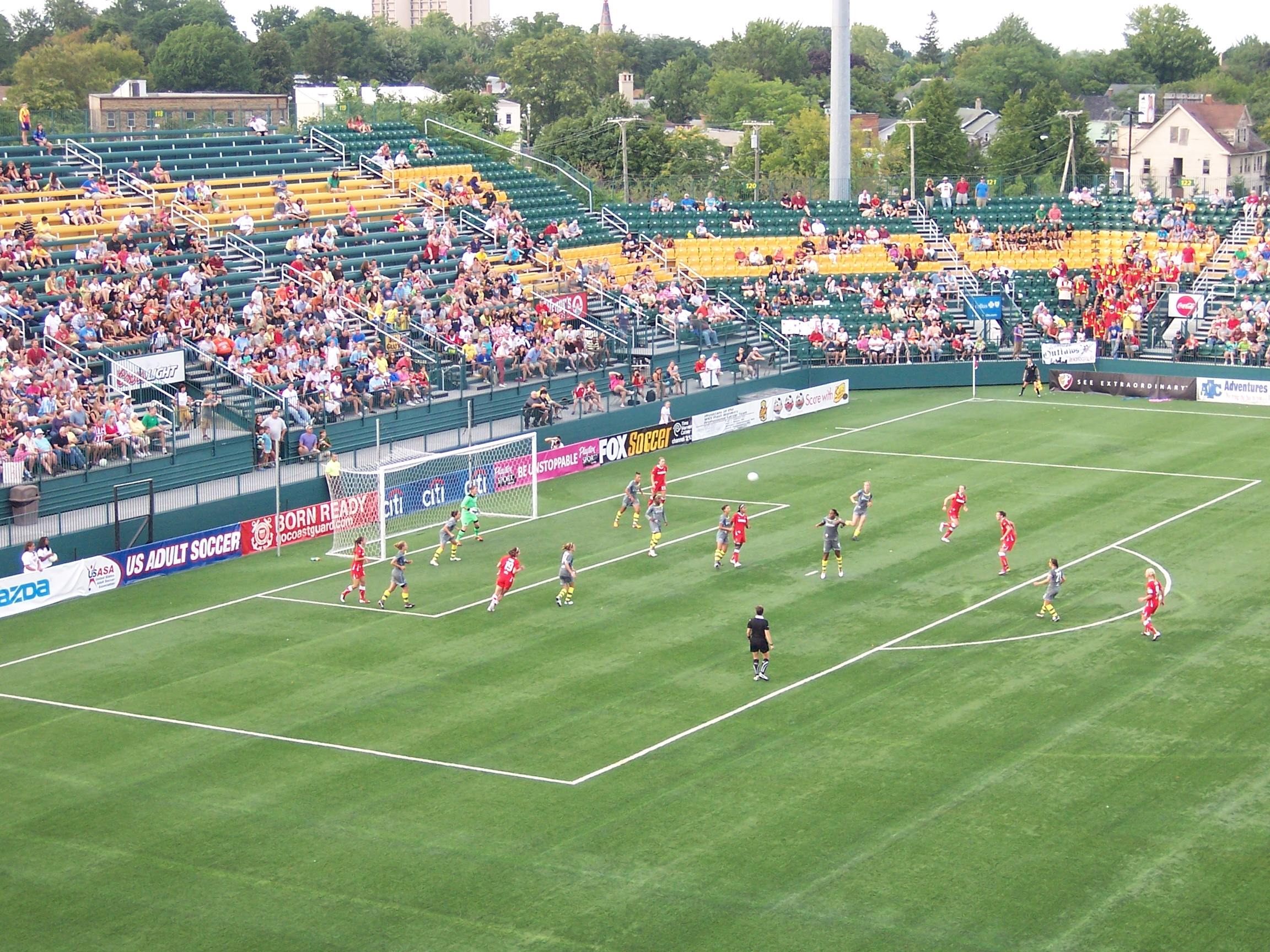
The Flash in action against the Philadelphia Independence during the 2011 Women's Professional Soccer Championship Game at Sahlen's Stadium in Rochester, New York.

The Flash joined the Women's Professional Soccer league as an expansion team in 2011, following its undefeated championship season in the USL W-League in 2010 as the Buffalo Flash. The team retained Aaran Lines, who coached the Flash the prior two seasons in the W-League, as its head coach, and remained under the ownership of Joe Sahlen.

== Squad ==
=== First-team squad ===
As of August 16, 2011

Note: Flags indicate national team as defined under FIFA eligibility rules; some limited exceptions apply. Players may hold more than one non-FIFA nationality.

No.	Pos.	Nation	Player
0	GK	(United States) USA	Brittany Cameron
2	DF	(United States) USA	Alexandra Sahlen
3	DF	(New Zealand) NZL	Ali Riley
4	MF	(Portugal) POR	Kim Brandão
5	DF	(Canada) CAN	Candace Chapman
6	DF	(United States) USA	Gina Lewandowski
7	MF	(United States) USA	McCall Zerboni
8	DF	(United States) USA	Kandace Wilson
9	MF	(Sweden) SWE	Caroline Seger (captain)
10	FW	(Brazil) BRA	Marta
12	FW	(Canada) CAN	Christine Sinclair
13	FW	(United States) USA	Alex Morgan

No.	Pos.	Nation	Player
14	MF	(United States) USA	Becky Edwards
16	FW	(England) ENG	Gemma Davison
17	DF	(United States) USA	Kaley Fountain
18	MF	(United States) USA	Yael Averbuch
19	MF	(United States) USA	Beverly Goebel
20	FW	(Brazil) BRA	Maurine
21	DF	(United States) USA	Brittany Bock
23	DF	(United States) USA	Whitney Engen
24	GK	(United States) USA	Ashlyn Harris
30	GK	(United States) USA	Ashleigh Bowers
38	FW	(United States) USA	Rebecca Moros

== Squad statistics ==
Source: WPS

Squad statistics are of the regular season only.

N	Pos	Player	GP	GS	Min	G	A	PK	Shot	SOG	SOG%	Foul	FS	YC	RC
18	M	Yael Averbuch	13	8	734	0	2	0	11	1	9%	4	5	0	0
21	M	Brittany Bock	18	17	1456	1	1	0	11	9	82%	21	16	2	0
4	D	Kimberly Brandao	2	2	180	0	1	0	0	0	—	0	1	0	0
5	D	Candace Chapman	12	12	1026	0	1	0	0	0	—	1	6	0	0
16	F	Gemma Davison	12	5	507	1	2	0	10	6	60%	6	9	0	0
14	D	Becky Edwards	18	18	1445	3	1	0	18	7	39%	15	13	2	0
23	D	Whitney Engen	17	17	1530	0	0	0	5	2	40%	3	5	1	0
17	F	Kaley Fountain	5	2	160	0	0	0	3	0	0%	0	0	1	0
19	M	Beverly Goebel	14	3	428	1	1	0	5	2	40%	2	3	0	0
6	D	Gina Lewandowski	8	6	594	0	0	0	0	0	—	5	4	1	0
10	F	Marta	14	13	1192	10	5	1	41	27	66%	17	16	0	0
20	F	Maurine	1	1	59	0	0	0	0	0	—	0	0	0	0
13	F	Alex Morgan	13	6	689	4	3	0	26	17	65%	8	8	0	0
38	F	Rebecca Moros	17	11	1098	0	0	0	3	2	67%	12	5	1	0
3	D	Ali Riley	15	15	1305	0	1	0	7	5	71%	6	4	0	0
2	D	Alexandra Sahlen	2	1	79	0	0	0	0	0	—	2	0	0	0
9	M	Caroline Seger	12	10	938	5	1	1	19	14	74%	7	9	1	0
12	F	Christine Sinclair	15	14	1191	10	8	1	44	25	57%	5	5	0	0
8	F	Kandace Wilson	13	9	875	0	0	0	4	2	50%	4	6	1	0
7	M	McCall Zerboni	14	11	915	4	3	0	13	8	62%	5	8	1	0
Team Total			235	181	16401	39	30	3	220	127	57.73%	123	123	11	0

N	Pos	Goal keeper	GP	GS	Min	GA	GA/G	PKA	PKF	Shot	Sav	Sav%	Sho	YC	RC
24	GK	Ashlyn Harris	18	18	1620	18	1.00	2	2	72	50	73.5%	5	0	0

== Club ==
=== Management ===
Position	Staff
Head coach	(New Zealand) Aaran Lines
Assistant coach	(United States) Scott Vallow
Strength and conditioning coach	(United States) Demeris Johnson

Last updated: August 22, 2011
Source: WPS

== Competitions ==
=== Women's Professional Soccer ===
==== Pre-season ====
March 26, 2011 Pre 1	Western New York Flash	3-1	Syracuse Orange	Rochester, NY, U.S.
				Stadium: Sahlen's Stadium

==== Regular season ====
April 17, 2011 WPS 1	Boston Breakers	1-2	Western New York Flash	Allston, Massachusetts, U.S.
	Bock (yellow card) 75'; Smith 90+'	Report	Sinclair 66' (Morgan); Davison 90+'	Stadium: Harvard Stadium; Attendance: 4,158; Referee: Kari Seitz

April 24, 2011 WPS 2	Atlanta Beat	2-2	Western New York Flash	Kennesaw, Georgia, U.S.
	Sesselmann (yellow card) 36'; Lloyd (yellow card) 43'; Chalupny 58'; Lloyd 70'; Flanagan (yellow card) 80'; Mitts (yellow card) 85'	Report	Sinclair 3' (Bock); Marta 67' (Sinclair); Fountain (yellow card) 71'	Stadium: Kennesaw State University Soccer Stadium; Attendance: 3,075

May 1, 2011 WPS 3	Western New York Flash	3-0	Atlanta Beat	Rochester, New York, U.S.
	Sinclair 23'; Engen (yellow card) 45+'; Sinclair 59' (Marta); Morgan 73' (Parker); Zerboni (yellow card) 89'	Report	Mitts (yellow card) 21'; Sesselmann (yellow card) 68'; Flanagan (yellow card) 75'	Stadium: Sahlen's Stadium; Attendance: 2,164; Referee: Ted Unkel

May 6, 2011 WPS 4	Western New York Flash	3-1	Sky Blue FC	Rochester, New York, U.S.
	Morgan 5' (Marta); Seger 40' (Marta); Marta 77' (Alex Morgan)	Report	Adriana 66' (Sjögran)	Stadium: Sahlen's Stadium; Attendance: 1,704; Referee: Christina Ibanez

May 13, 2011 WPS 5	Western New York Flash	3-2	Boston Breakers	Rochester, New York, U.S.
	Bock 10' (Zerboni); Zerboni 25' (Brandao); Zerboni 69' (Davison)	Report	Bogus 38' (Washington); Moore 80' (penalty)	Stadium: Sahlen's Stadium; Attendance: 1,372

May 22, 2011 WPS 6	Western New York Flash	3-0	magicJack	Rochester, New York, U.S.
	Edwards 3' (Sinclair); Seger 42' (Sinclair); Bock (yellow card) 68'; Seger 84' (penalty)	Report	Ellertson (yellow card) 84'	Stadium: Sahlen's Stadium; Attendance: 8,076; Referee: Daniel Radford

May 29, 2011 WPS 7	Philadelphia Independence	1-2	Western New York Flash	Chester, Pennsylvania, U.S.
	Rapinoe 9' (Sanderson); Magnusdottir (yellow card) 26'; Rapinoe (yellow card) 75'; McNeill (yellow card) 87'	Report	Edwards 14' (Zerboni); Marta 23' (penalty); Lewandowski (yellow card) 53'	Stadium: Widener University; Attendance: 3,456; Referee: Christina Ibanez

June 3, 2011 WPS 8	Western New York Flash	2-2	Sky Blue FC	Rochester, New York, U.S.
	Edwards (yellow card) 13'; Seger (yellow card) 25'; Sinclair 39' (Davison); Seger 44' (Sinclair)	Report	Blank (yellow card) 14'; Long 65' (penalty); Nogueira 88' (Adriana)	Stadium: Sahlen's Stadium; Attendance: 2,643; Referee: Felisha Mariscal

June 12, 2011 WPS 9	Western New York Flash	0-1	Philadelphia Independence	Rochester, New York, U.S.
	Magnusdottir (yellow card) 78'; Adams 90+' (Sanderson)	Report	Lohman (yellow card) 22'; Buczkowski (yellow card) 72'; Wilson (yellow card) 83'	Stadium: Sahlen's Stadium; Attendance: 2,397; Referee: Daniel Radford

July 9, 2011 WPS 10	Philadelphia Independence	2-1	Western New York Flash	Chester, Pennsylvania, U.S.
	Kai 8' (DiMartino); Farrelly 45+'	Report	Sinclair 81' (penalty)	Stadium: Widener University; Attendance: 2,556; Referee: Moo Hackett

July 17, 2011 WPS 11	Sky Blue FC	0-2	Western New York Flash	Piscataway, New Jersey, U.S.
	Branam (yellow card) 34'	Report	Edwards (yellow card) 43'; Dew 81' (o.g.); Goebel 86' (Sinclair)	Stadium: Yurcak Field; Attendance: 1,441; Referee: Ted Unkel

July 20, 2011 WPS 12	Western New York Flash	3-1	magicJack	Rochester, New York, U.S.
	Sinclair 9' (Edwards); Sinclair 51' (Marta); Zerboni 69' (Sinclair)	Report	Masar 41' (Washington)	Stadium: Sahlen's Stadium; Attendance: 15,404; Referee: Christina Ibanez

July 24, 2011 WPS 13	Boston Breakers	2-2	Western New York Flash	Allston, Massachusetts, U.S.
	O'Hara 20' (Schoepfer); O'Hara (yellow card) 67'; O'Hara 84' (Zimmeck)	Report	Marta 38' (Zerboni); Morgan 87'	Stadium: Harvard Stadium; Attendance: 6,222; Referee: Daniel Radford

July 30, 2011 WPS 14	Sky Blue FC	1-4	Western New York Flash	Piscataway, New Jersey, U.S.
	Adriana 22' (Sjögran); Dew (yellow card) 83'	Report	Zerboni 29'; Marta 35' (Averbuch); Sinclair 38' (Chapman); Morgan 90+' (Goebel)	Stadium: Yurcak Field; Attendance: 5,065; Referee: Kari Seitz

August 3, 2011 WPS 15	Western New York Flash	2-1	Boston Breakers	Rochester, New York, U.S.
	Sinclair 21' (Marta); Edwards 28' (Riley)	Report	Winters 47' (O'Hara)	Stadium: Sahlen's Stadium; Attendance: 4,463; Referee: Patrick Baker

August 6, 2011 WPS 16	Atlanta Beat	0-2	Western New York Flash	Kennesaw, Georgia, U.S.
		Report	Marta 10' (Averbuch); Marta 41' (Sinclair)	Stadium: Kennesaw State University Soccer Stadium; Attendance: 7,112

August 10, 2011 WPS 17	magicJack	1-2	Western New York Flash	Boca Raton, Florida, U.S.
	Schmidt 71' (Rampone); Wambach (yellow card) 85'	Report	Moros (yellow card) 56'; Marta 65' (Seger); Marta 74'	Stadium: FAU Soccer Field; Attendance: 4,011; Referee: Daniel Radford

August 14, 2011 WPS 18	Western New York Flash	2-0	Atlanta Beat	Rochester, New York, U.S.
	Seger 37' (Morgan); Marta 75' (Sinclair)	Report		Stadium: Sahlen's Stadium; Attendance: 5,702; Referee: Moo Hackett

==== Results by round ====
Round	1	2	3	4	5	6	7	8	9	10	11	12	13	14	15	16	17	18
Ground	A	A	H	H	H	H	A	H	H	A	A	H	A	A	H	A	A	H
Result	W	D	W	W	W	W	W	D	L	L	W	W	D	W	W	W	W	W

Updated to match(es) played on August 22, 2011. Source: WPS
A = Away; H = Home; W = Win; D = Draw; L = Loss

==== Home/Away Results ====
Overall								Home						Away					
Pld	W	D	L	GF	GA	GD	Pts	W	D	L	GF	GA	GD	W	D	L	GF	GA	GD
18	13	3	2	40	18	+22	42	7	1	1	21	8	+13	6	2	1	19	10	+9

Last updated: August 22, 2011.
Source: WPS

==== League table ====
Pos	Team	Pld	W	D	L	GF	GA	GD	Pts	Promotion or relegation
1	Western New York Flash	18	13	3	2	40	18	+22	42	Advance to Championship
2	Philadelphia Independence	18	11	3	4	31	18	+13	36	Advance to Super Semifinal
3	magicJack	18	9	2	7	29	29	0	28 (Note: magicJack were deducted a point for various league violations.)	Advance to First round
4	Boston Breakers	18	5	4	9	19	24	−5	19 (Note: BOS: 7 pts; SKY: 4 pt)	Advance to First round
5	Sky Blue FC	18	5	4	9	24	29	−5	19	
6	Atlanta Beat	18	1	4	13	7	32	−25	7	

Updated to match(es) played on unknown. Source: soccerway
Rules for classification: 1) points, 2) goal difference, 3) head-to-head result.

=== WPS Playoffs ===
August 27, 2011 WPS Championship	Western New York Flash	1-1 (a.e.t.) (5-4 p)	Philadelphia Independence	Rochester, New York, U.S.
4:00 p.m. (EST)	Edwards (yellow card) 25'; Sinclair 64'; Goebel (yellow card) 96' (yellow-red card) 108'; Marta (yellow card) 103'	Report	Rodriguez 88', (yellow card) 90+3'	Stadium: Sahlen's Stadium; Attendance: 10,461; Referee: Kari Seitz
	Penalties
	Marta (penalty scored); Sinclair (penalty scored); Zerboni (penalty scored); Seger (penalty scored); Averbuch (penalty scored)		(penalty scored) Sanderson; (penalty scored) Adams; (penalty scored) Robinson; (penalty scored) Boquete; (penalty missed) del Rio

== Awards ==
=== WPS Player of the Week ===
Week	Player of the Week	Week's Statline
Week 4	(Canada) Christine Sinclair	2 G, GWG
Week 5	(Brazil) Marta	2 A, 1 G, GWA
Week 6	(United States) McCall Zerboni	1 A, 2 G, GWG
Week 7	(Sweden) Caroline Seger	2 G
Week 15	(Canada) Christine Sinclair	1 A, 2 G, GWG
Week 15	(Canada) Christine Sinclair	BOS 2-2 WNY

=== WPS Player of the Month ===
Month	Player of the Month	Month's Statline
May	(United States) McCall Zerboni	2 G, 2 A in 5 games; Flash 5-0 in May

=== WPS year-end awards ===
Award	Player	Notes
WPS Defender of the Year	(United States) Whitney Engen	Started and played the full 90 in all but one game
US Coast Guard Goalkeeper of the Year	(United States) Ashlyn Harris	Led the league in regular season goals per game average (1.00)
PUMA Golden Boot (Top Scorer)	(Brazil) Marta	Scored ten goals, earning her third consecutive award

Source: 2011 WPS Year End Awards

==== WPS Best XI ====
Player	Position
Ashlyn Harris	Goalkeeper
Whitney Engen *	Defense
Ali Riley	Defense
Caroline Seger	Midfield
Christine Sinclair *	Forward
Marta	Forward

* – unanimous selection
Source: WPS Announces Best XI of 2011

== See also ==
- 2011 Women's Professional Soccer season
- 2011 Women's Professional Soccer Playoffs
