= 2009 Buffalo Flash season =

Buffalo Flash
2009 Western New York Flash season
- President: Alexandra Sahlen
- Head coach: Aaran Lines
- Stadium: Orchard Park High School Field
- W-League: 2nd, Great Lakes Division
- W-League Playoffs: Central Conference semi-final
- Top goalscorer: League: All: Abby Wambach (11)
- Average home league attendance: 210
Home colors	Away colors

The 2009 season was Buffalo Flash's first season of existence, and the first in which they competed in the W-League, at the time the second division of women's soccer in the United States.

== Club ==
=== Roster ===
Note: Flags indicate national team as defined under FIFA eligibility rules; some limited exceptions apply. Players may hold more than one non-FIFA nationality.

No.	Pos.	Nation	Player
0	GK	USA	Amanda Becker
2	DF	USA	Sarah Wagenfuhr
3	DF	POR	Kimberly Brandão
4	DF	USA	Erika Sutton
5	FW	USA	Jamie Craft
6	DF	USA	Jessica O'Rourke
7	MF	USA	Shaylyn Lawrence
8	DF	USA	Katarina Tarr
9	MF	USA	Brooke Barbuto

No.	Pos.	Nation	Player
10	DF	USA	Alexandra Sahlen
12	MF	USA	Jacquelyn Lacek
14	DF	USA	Lena Mosebo
15	FW	ESP	Maria Ruiz
16	MF	USA	Ashley Nick
18	FW	ITA	Pamela Conti
19	FW	USA	Rosie Tantillo
21	DF	JPN	Rie Sawai

== Match results ==
=== Playoffs ===
Central Divisional Round	Buffalo Flash	5–0	Quebec City Amiral SC	Buffalo, New York
				Stadium: Orchard Park High School Field

Central Semifinals	Buffalo Flash	0–3	FC Indiana	Indianapolis, Indiana
				Stadium: Kuntz Stadium

=== Standings ===
==== Great Lakes Division ====
Place	Team	P	W	L	T	GF	GA	GD	Points
1	Ottawa Fury Women	14	11	1	2	40	9	+31	35
2	Buffalo Flash	14	9	2	3	40	10	+30	30
3	Quebec City Amiral SC	14	9	4	1	29	17	+12	28
4	Toronto Lady Lynx	14	6	4	4	25	17	+8	22
5	Laval Comets	13	7	5	1	21	14	+7	22
6	London Gryphons	14	3	9	2	23	33	−10	11
7	Hamilton Avalanche	14	3	9	2	14	35	−21	11
8	Rochester Ravens	14	0	13	1	5	61	−55	1

== See also ==
- 2009 W-League season
