= 2010 Buffalo Flash season =

Buffalo Flash
2010 Buffalo Flash season
- President: Alexandra Sahlen
- Head coach: Aaran Lines
- Stadium: Orchard Park High School Field
- W-League: 1st, Midwest Division
- W-League Playoffs: W-League Champions
- Average home league attendance: 236
Home colors	Away colors

The 2010 season was Buffalo Flash's second season of existence, and the second in which they competed in the W-League, at the time the second division of women's soccer in the United States. This was the last year the Flash operated under the Buffalo name, they became the Western New York Flash when they moved on to Women's Professional Soccer in 2011.

The Buffalo Flash won the 2010 W-League title.

== Club ==
=== Roster ===
Note: Flags indicate national team as defined under FIFA eligibility rules; some limited exceptions apply. Players may hold more than one non-FIFA nationality.

No.	Pos.	Nation	Player
0	GK	USA	Amanda Becker
2	DF	USA	Sarah Wagenfuhr
3	DF	POR	Kimberly Brandão
4	DF	USA	Erika Sutton
5	FW	USA	Jamie Craft
6	DF	USA	Jessica O'Rourke
7	MF	USA	Shaylyn Lawrence
8	DF	USA	Katarina Tarr
9	MF	USA	Brooke Barbuto

No.	Pos.	Nation	Player
10	DF	USA	Alexandra Sahlen
12	MF	USA	Jacquelyn Lacek
14	DF	USA	Lena Mosebo
15	FW	ESP	María Ruiz
16	MF	USA	Ashley Nick
18	FW	ITA	Pamela Conti
19	FW	USA	Rosie Tantillo
21	DF	JPN	Rie Sawai

== Match results ==
=== Playoffs ===
Central Semifinals	Toronto Lady Lynx	0-3	Buffalo Flash	Lewiston, New York
	Afonso (yellow card) 28'		Boquete 20' 41'; Parker 69'	Stadium: Niagara Field

Central Championship	Buffalo Flash	1-0	Ottawa Fury Women	Lewiston, New York
	Parker 20'; Boquete (yellow card) 83'		Romagnuolo (yellow card) 57'; Wetzel (yellow card) 89' (yellow-red card) 90+'

W-League Semifinal	Atlanta Silverbacks Women	1-3	Buffalo Flash	Santa Clarita, California
	Powell 36'		Hammond 18'; Parker 53' 81'	Stadium: Harry Welch Stadium

W-League Championship	Vancouver Whitecaps Women	1-3	Buffalo Flash	Santa Clarita, California
	Vermeulen (yellow card) 53' (goal) 57'		Davison 61'; Boquete 64' 88'	Stadium: Harry Welch Stadium

=== Standings ===
==== Midwest Division ====
Place	Team	P	W	L	T	GF	GA	GD	Points
1	Buffalo Flash	12	10	0	2	48	5	+43	32
2	Chicago Red Eleven	12	8	2	2	32	8	+24	26
3	Kalamazoo Outrage	12	4	7	1	18	26	-8	13
4	Cleveland Internationals Women	12	3	8	1	16	39	-23	10
5	London Gryphons	12	1	9	2	6	25	-19	5

== See also ==
- 2010 USL W-League season
