= 2013 Western New York Flash season =

Western New York Flash
2013 Western New York Flash season
- President: Alexandra Sahlen
- Head coach: Aaran Lines
- Stadium: Sahlen's Stadium
- NWSL: 1st
- NWSL Playoffs: NWSL Championship Runner-up
- Highest home attendance: 9,129 vs Portland Thorns FC (August 31, 2013 – NWSL Championship)
- Lowest home attendance: 2,127 vs Sky Blue FC (May 1, 2013)
Home colors	Away colors

The 2013 season was Western New York Flash's sixth season of existence, and the first in which they competed in the National Women's Soccer League (NWSL), the new top division of women's soccer in the United States. The Flash began play in 2009 in the USL W-League and moved to the top-division league, Women's Professional Soccer (WPS), in 2011. After WPS folded in 2012, the team played for one season in Women's Premier Soccer League Elite before their acceptance into NWSL for the league's inaugural season.

The Flash played their home matches at Sahlen's Stadium in Rochester, New York. The team won the NWSL Shield with the best record in the league during the regular season. It was their fourth consecutive year with a league title, across four different leagues. The Flash advanced to the 2013 NWSL Championship, which they hosted against Portland Thorns FC; the Thorns won the inaugural championship in front of 9,129 spectators at Sahlen's Stadium.

== Club ==
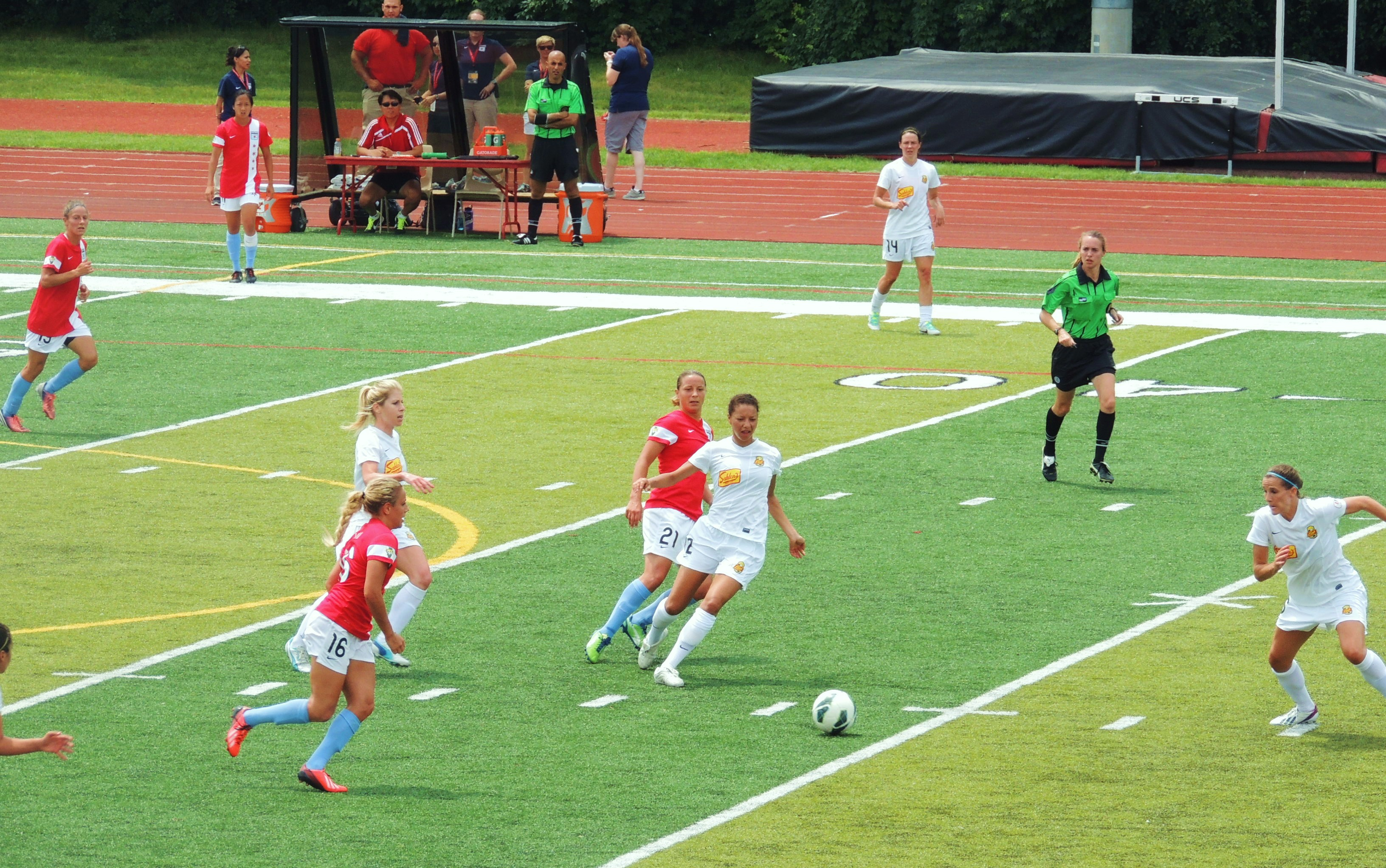
July 4, 2013; Chicago Red Stars vs Western New York Flash. Playing at midfield, left to right: Pérez-17, Sitch-19, Quon-11, Leon-16, Zerboni-7, Grings-21, Johnson-12, Huffman-14, Reynolds-16

=== Roster ===
Note: Flags indicate national team as defined under FIFA eligibility rules; some limited exceptions apply. Players may hold more than one non-FIFA nationality.

No.	Pos.	Nation	Player
1	GK	MEX	Pamela Tajonar
2	DF	USA	Alexandra Sahlen
3	DF	CAN	Bryanna McCarthy
4	FW	AUS	Samantha Kerr
6	DF	USA	Angela Salem
7	MF	USA	McCall Zerboni
8	FW	ESP	Adriana Martín
9	MF	USA	Ingrid Wells
10	MF	USA	Carli Lloyd
11	FW	USA	Laura Heyboer

No.	Pos.	Nation	Player
12	DF	CMR	Estelle Johnson
13	DF	USA	Brittany Taylor
14	MF	USA	Sarah Huffman
15	MF	USA	Vicki DiMartino
16	DF	USA	Katherine Reynolds
17	MF	MEX	Verónica Pérez
20	FW	USA	Abby Wambach
22	DF	USA	Amy Barczuk
23	MF	CAN	Jodi-Ann Robinson
24	GK	USA	Adrianna Franch

== Match results ==
=== Regular season ===
April 14, 2013 1	Sky Blue FC	1–0	Western New York Flash	Piscataway, New Jersey
18:00 EST	Zerboni 42' (o.g.)	Report		Stadium: Yurcak Field; Attendance: 2,611

April 20, 2013 2	Washington Spirit	1–1	Western New York Flash	Germantown, Maryland
19:00 EST	Huster (yellow card) 84'; Matheson 87'	Report	Kerr 85'	Stadium: Maryland SoccerPlex; Attendance: 4,569; Referee: Kari Seitz

April 27, 2013 3	Western New York Flash	1–2	Boston Breakers	Rochester, New York
19:35 EST	Kerr 7'	Report	O'Reilly 16', 83'; Whitehill (yellow card) 62'	Stadium: Sahlen's Stadium; Attendance: 4,065; Referee: Eugene Mednikov

May 1, 2013 4	Western New York Flash	2–1	Sky Blue FC	Rochester, New York
19:00 EST	Martín 6'; Wambach 20'; Kerr (yellow card) 45'	Report	Schmidt 44'; O'Hara (yellow card) 72'	Stadium: Sahlen's Stadium; Attendance: 2,127; Referee: Miguel Panduro

May 11, 2013 5	Western New York Flash	2–1	FC Kansas City	Rochester, New York
19:35 EST	Wambach 34', 39'; Heyboer (yellow card) 90+5'	Report	Cheney 53'; Sesselmann (yellow card) 90+1'	Stadium: Sahlen's Stadium; Attendance: 2,738; Referee: Katja Koroleva

May 24, 2013 6	Western New York Flash	2–1	Chicago Red Stars	Rochester, New York
19:05 EST	Wambach 54'; Zerboni 65'; Lloyd (yellow card) 74'	Report	Chalupny (yellow card) 43' (goal) 52'	Stadium: Sahlen's Stadium; Attendance: 3,152; Referee: Robert Sibiga

June 5, 2013 7	Boston Breakers	2–2	Western New York Flash	Somerville, Massachusetts
19:00 EST	Sanderson 44'; Nogueira (yellow card) 58'; Leroux 64'	Report	Wambach 28'; Taylor (yellow card) 75'; Robinson 90+4'	Stadium: Dilboy Stadium; Attendance: 2,124; Referee: John McCloskey

June 8, 2013 8	Sky Blue FC	0–3	Western New York Flash	Piscataway, New Jersey
19:00 EST		Report	Kerr 4'; Lloyd 45'; Reynolds (yellow card) 50'; Wambach 82'	Stadium: Yurcak Field; Attendance: 2,056; Referee: Josh Wilkens

June 15, 2013 9	Washington Spirit	0–2	Western New York Flash	Germantown, Maryland
19:00 EST		Report	Perez 10'; DiMartino 31' (yellow card) 36'; Martín (yellow card) 56'	Stadium: Maryland SoccerPlex; Attendance: 4,569; Referee: Boris Senic

June 19, 2013 10	Chicago Red Stars	2–2	Western New York Flash	Lisle, Illinois
18:30 EST	Mautz 1'; Osborne 40'	Report	Martín 12'; Zerboni (yellow card) 72'; Taylor 89'	Stadium: Village of Lisle-Benedictine University Sports Complex; Attendance: 790; Referee: Kara Honthumb

June 23, 2013 11	Western New York Flash	1–1	Seattle Reign FC	Rochester, New York
19:05 EST	Wambach 56' (pen.); Robinson (yellow card) 73'	Report	Winters 28'; Dallstream (red card) 56'; Fishlock (yellow card) 84'	Stadium: Sahlen's Stadium; Attendance: 6,347; Referee: Miguel Panduro

June 28, 2013 12	Western New York Flash	4–0	Washington Spirit	Rochester, New York
19:05 EST	Lloyd 3', 22', 56'; Taylor 90+1'	Report		Stadium: Sahlen's Stadium; Attendance: 3,364; Referee: Miguel Panduro

July 4, 2013 13	Chicago Red Stars	1–0	Western New York Flash	Lisle, Illinois
13:00 CST	Quon (yellow card) 14'; Chalupny 58'	Report		Stadium: Village of Lisle-Benedictine University Sports Complex; Attendance: 2,064; Referee: Juliana Duncan

July 7, 2013 14	FC Kansas City	0–0	Western New York Flash	Overland Park, Kansas
		Report		Stadium: Shawnee Mission District Stadium; Attendance: 5,031; Referee: Elvis Mahmutovic

July 11, 2013 15	Seattle Reign FC	3–2	Western New York Flash	Tukwila, Washington
14:00 (PST)	Fishlock 14'; Rapinoe 44'; Nairn 82'	Report	Wambach 10', 47'	Stadium: Starfire Stadium; Attendance: 2,514; Referee: Robert Sibiga

July 14, 2013 16	Portland Thorns FC	1–1	Western New York Flash	Portland, Oregon
18:00 (PST)	Shim 38'; Heath (yellow card) 85'	Summary	Wambach (yellow card) 23' (goal) 37'; Salem (yellow card) 90+1'	Stadium: Jeld-Wen Field; Attendance: 13,021; Referee: (United States) Ted Unkel

July 21, 2013 17	Western New York Flash	3–0	Sky Blue FC	Rochester, New York
14:30 (PST)	Lloyd 13'; Taylor 35'; Kerr 56'	Summary		Stadium: Sahlen's Stadium; Attendance: 4,664; Referee: (United States) Kara Honthumb

July 31, 2013 18	Western New York Flash	3–0	Washington Spirit	Rochester, New York
20:05 (PST)	Martin 35' Kerr 60' Lloyd 68'	Report		Stadium: Sahlen's Stadium; Attendance: 3,967; Referee: Miguel Panduro

August 3, 2013 19	Boston Breakers	2–2	Western New York Flash	Somerville, Massachusetts
	Simon 17'; Sanderson 65'	Report	DiMartino 77'; Lloyd 85'	Stadium: Dilboy Stadium; Attendance: 2,899; Referee: Christina Unkel

August 7, 2013 20	Western New York Flash	1–0	Seattle Reign FC	Rochester, New York
19:05 (PST)	Lloyd 54'	Report		Stadium: Sahlen's Stadium; Attendance: 4,993; Referee: Robert Sibiga

August 10, 2013 21	Western New York Flash	0–0	Portland Thorns FC	Rochester, New York
20:35		Report		Stadium: Sahlen's Stadium; Attendance: 7,606; Referee: Margaret Domka

August 17, 2013 22	Western New York Flash	2–1	Boston Breakers	Rochester, New York
20:35	Kerr 23' Wambach 28'		Wilkinson 55'	Stadium: Sahlen's Stadium; Attendance: 6311

=== Playoffs ===
August 24, 2013 Semifinal	Western New York Flash	2–0	Sky Blue FC	Rochester, New York
20:00 ET	Lloyd 33' Lloyd 90+3'			Stadium: Sahlen's Stadium; Attendance: 7,316; Referee: Katja Koroleva

August 31, 2013 Final	Western New York Flash	0–2	Portland Thorns FC	Rochester, New York Stadium: Sahlen's Stadium
20:00 ET			Heath 40' Sinclair 92+'	Attendance: 9,129; Referee: Kari Seitz

=== Standings ===
Pos	Team	Pld	W	D	L	GF	GA	GD	Pts	Qualification
1	Western New York Flash	22	10	8	4	36	20	+16	38	NWSL Shield
2	FC Kansas City	22	11	5	6	34	22	+12	38	NWSL Playoffs
3	Portland Thorns FC (C)	22	11	5	6	32	25	+7	38	NWSL Playoffs
4	Sky Blue FC	22	10	6	6	31	26	+5	36	NWSL Playoffs
5	Boston Breakers	22	8	6	8	35	34	+1	30	
6	Chicago Red Stars	22	8	6	8	32	36	−4	30	
7	Seattle Reign FC	22	5	3	14	22	36	−14	18	
8	Washington Spirit	22	3	5	14	16	39	−23	14	

Source: soccerway.com
Rules for classification: Tiebreakers
(C) Champions

==== Results summary ====
Overall								Home						Away					
Pld	Pts	W	L	T	GF	GA	GD	W	L	T	GF	GA	GD	W	L	T	GF	GA	GD
22	38	10	4	8	36	20	+16	8	1	2	21	7	+14	2	3	6	15	13	+2

Last updated: August 3, 2015
Source: Soccerway
Pld = Matches played; Pts = Points; W = Matches won; T = Matches tied; L = Matches lost; GF = Goals for; GA = Goals against; GD = Goal difference

==== Results by round ====
Round	1	2	3	4	5	6	7	8	9	10	11	12	13	14	15	16	17	18	19	20	21	22
Stadium	A	A	H	H	H	H	A	A	A	A	H	H	A	A	A	A	H	H	A	H	H	H
Result	L	D	L	W	W	W	D	W	W	D	D	W	L	D	L	D	W	W	D	W	D	W

Updated to match(es) played on August 13, 2013. Source: Soccerway
A = Away; H = Home; W = Win; D = Draw; L = Loss

== See also ==
- 2013 National Women's Soccer League season
