= Kandace Wilson =

American soccer player (born 1984)

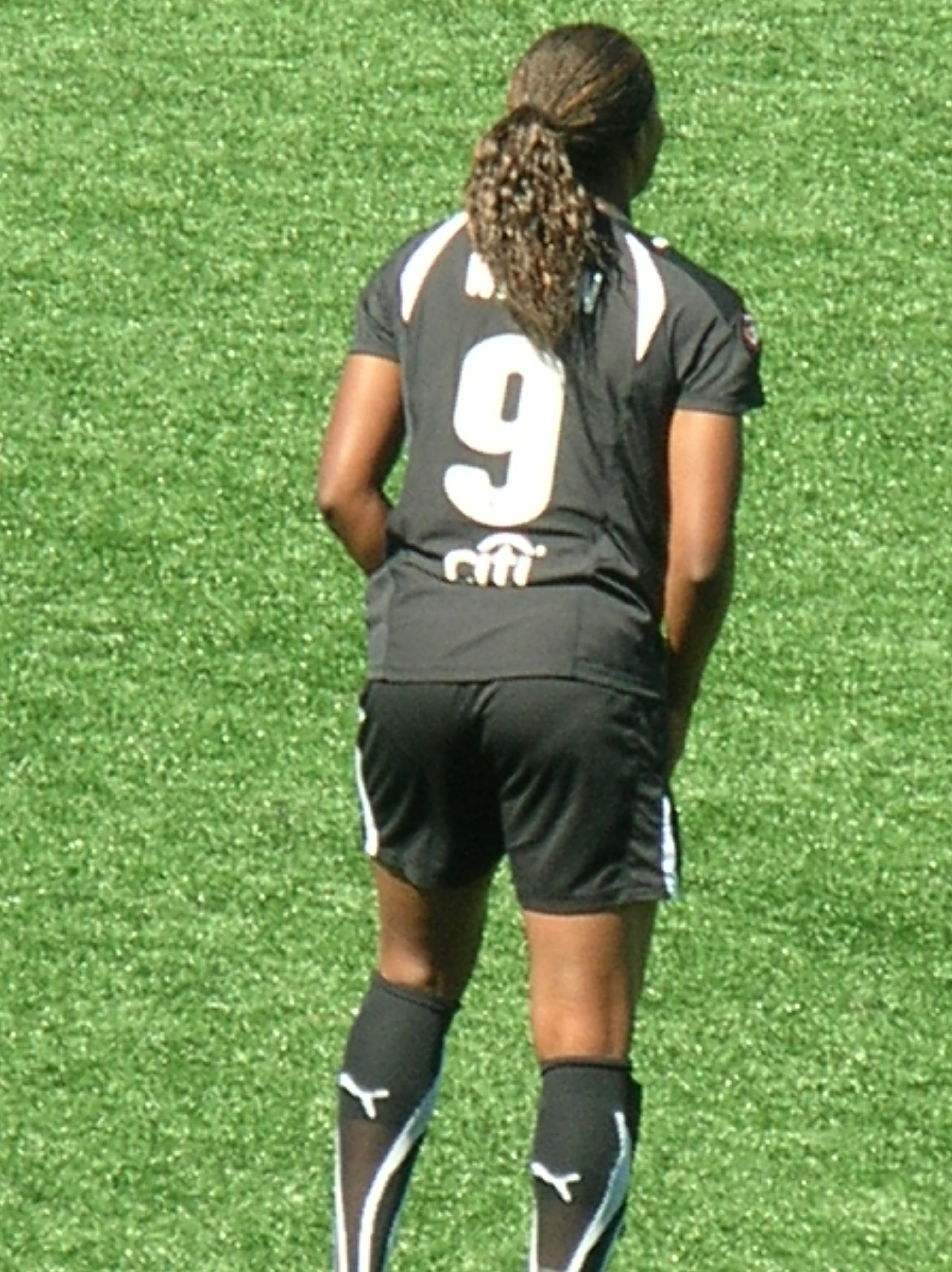

Personal information
- Full name: Kandace LaShawn Love
- Birth name: Kandace LaShawn Wilson
- Date of birth: October 24, 1984 (age 42)
- Place of birth: Los Angeles, California, United States
- Height: 5 ft 6 in (1.68 m)
- Position: Defender

Team information
- Current team: California Storm

College career
Years	Team	Apps	(Gls)
2002–2005	Cal State Fullerton Titans		

Senior career*
Years	Team	Apps	(Gls)
2007	Ajax America	9	(15)
2008	Pali Blues	12	(0)
2009–2010	FC Gold Pride	30	(0)
2011	Western New York Flash	13	(0)
2013–	Sky Blue FC		
- * Club domestic league appearances and goals

Kandace LaShawn Love (née Wilson; born October 24, 1984) is an American professional soccer defender who previously played for So Cal Union FC in the Women's Premier Soccer League. She previously played for the FC Gold Pride and Western New York Flash of Women's Professional Soccer.

== Early life ==
Wilson was born in Los Angeles, California.

=== Cal State Fullerton ===
Wilson attended Cal State Fullerton and was a three-time All-Big West Conference First Team selection. In 2005, she was named the Big West Co-Offensive Player of the Year following her senior season.

== Playing career ==
=== Club ===
Wilson was drafted with the 13th overall selection in the 2008 WPS General Draft by FC Gold Pride. She assumed a starting role with the club, but suffered a season-ending hip injury on May 24, 2009, against the Los Angeles Sol. Late in the game while guarding Marta, Wilson "was aggressively pushed off the ball and fell to the ground suffering a sublimation (partial separation) of her left hip and fracturing the left posterior aspect of the acetabulum (hip socket)."

In 2011, she played for the Western New York Flash, the team's inaugural season in the Women's Professional Soccer league. The team won the league championship.

In February 2013 she joined Sky Blue FC in the new National Women's Soccer League

== Coaching career ==
Wilson is an assistant coach at Cal State Fullerton.
