= 2017 Western New York Flash season =

Western New York Flash
2017 Western New York Flash season
- Head coach: Gary Bruce
- Stadium: Niagara Field
Home colors	Away colors

The 2017 season was Western New York Flash's tenth season, and the first in which they competed in the United Women's Soccer league in the second division of women's soccer in the United States. It was an almost entirely different team from the prior season's, which competed in the top-division National Women's Soccer League before being sold and moved to North Carolina.

== First-team squad ==
Florida State University forward Maddie Pezzino was the newly reformed club's first signing.

Note: Flags indicate national team as defined under FIFA eligibility rules; some limited exceptions apply. Players may hold more than one non-FIFA nationality.

No.	Pos.	Nation	Player
00	GK		Ashlee Schumacher
0			Alana Rossi
1	GK		Megan Tock
2			Kelsey Ferguson
3			Sarah Karlik
4			Paige Buscaglia
5			Kara Daly
6			Margretta Dry
7			Carissima Cutrona
8			Brittany Heist
9			Kaelyn Gamel
10			Rachel Fiore
11			Meghan Simmons
12			Danielle Braun

No.	Pos.	Nation	Player
13			Hope Balling
14			Madison Good
15			Jenna Raepple
16			Madisyn Pezzino
17			Christiana Davies
18			Sydney Cerza
19			Rebecca Sanzsole
20			Gloria Okoro Chinasa
21			Marcy Barberic
21			Tess Ford
22			Taylor Requa
23			Shannon Carr
25			Kenna Kosinski

Source: UWS

== Match results ==
=== Regular season ===
The Flash announced their schedule on March 11, 2016.

May 13 1	Long Island Rough Riders	1-1	Western New York Flash	South Huntington, New York
5:00 p.m.	Quinonez 31'	Report	Gamel 86' (Heist)	Stadium: Cy Donnelly Stadium

May 14 2	New York Surf	1-0	Western New York Flash	Bronx, New York
2 p.m.	O'Connor 14'	Report		Stadium: SUNY Maritime

May 20 3	Western New York Flash	2-2	New York Surf	Buffalo, New York
4 p.m.	Cutrona 61' (Pezzino); Pezzino 87' (Dry)	Report	Gamby 43' (Doyle); Velaj 57' (Doyle)	Stadium: All-High Stadium

June 3 4	Western New York Flash	0-7	Long Island Rough Riders	Lewiston, New York
7 p.m.		Report	Vasquez 5' (Loughren); Dutcher 14' (Vasquez); Groth 38' (Dutcher); Venezia 43' (Dutcher); Dutcher 51'; Neville 57'; Neville 83' (Vasquez)	Stadium: Niagara Stadium

June 10 5	Western New York Flash	1-0	New England Mutiny	Lewiston, New York
7 p.m.	Cutrona 33' (Heist)	Report		Stadium: Niagara Stadium

June 11 6	Western New York Flash	1-3	New Jersey Copa FC	Lewiston, New York
3 p.m.	Cutrona 37' (Heist)	Report	Freda 11' (Bruno); Nuñez 76' (Raber), 81' (Smith)	Stadium: Niagara Stadium

June 17 7	Western New York Flash	4-1	Rochester Lancers	Lewiston, New York
7 p.m.	Pezzino 2' (Cutrona), 29' (Cutrona); Cutrona 51' (Pezzino), 76' (Pezzino)	Report	VanCuyck 7'	Stadium: Niagara Stadium

June 24 8	Rochester Lancers	2-3	Western New York Flash	Rochester, New York
1 p.m.	Wingerden 32'; Arieno 87'	Report	Cutrona 9', 76'; Pezzino 66' (Cutrona)	Stadium: Wegmans Sports Complex

July 8 9	New York Magic	v	Western New York Flash	Brooklyn, New York
3 p.m.				Stadium: Poly Prep Country Day School

July 9 10	New England Mutiny	v	Western New York Flash	East Longmeadow, Massachusetts
3 p.m.				Stadium: East Longmeadow High School

=== Standings ===
Pos	Team	Pld	W	L	T	GF	GA	GD	Pts	Qualification
1	New Jersey Copa FC	10	8	1	1	23	7	+16	25	2017 East Conference playoffs
2	Long Island Rough Riders	10	7	2	1	35	10	+25	22	2017 East Conference playoffs
3	New England Mutiny	10	7	3	0	23	10	+13	21	
4	New York Surf	10	6	2	2	25	12	+13	20	
5	Western New York Flash	10	4	4	2	18	21	−3	14	
6	Lancaster Inferno	10	4	6	0	18	23	−5	12	
7	Rochester Lady Lancers	10	0	9	1	10	35	−25	1	
8	New York Magic	10	0	9	1	4	38	−34	1	

Source: UWS standings
Rules for classification: 1) points; 2) head-to-head (if only 2 teams) 3) wins; 4) goal difference (maximum +5 goal difference in a game); 5) goals scored; 6) total points in smallest group; 7) points earned against top 4 finishers; 8) points outside smallest group; 9) lottery

== See also ==
- 2017 United Women's Soccer season
