= Scott Vallow =

American soccer player (born 1977)

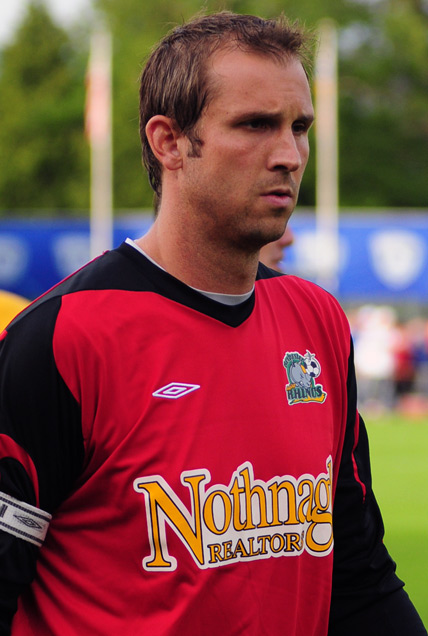

Personal information
- Full name: Scott Joseph Vallow
- Date of birth: June 8, 1977 (age 49)
- Place of birth: Modesto, California, United States
- Height: 6 ft 3 in (1.91 m)
- Position: Goalkeeper

Youth career
- 1995–1998: Bowling Green Falcons

Senior career*
Years	Team	Apps	(Gls)
1999	Dallas Burn	0	(0)
1999	→ MLS Pro-40 (loan)	16	(0)
2000–2002	Rochester Rhinos	45	(0)
2002	→ Dallas Burn (loan)	0	(0)
2003–2004	Colorado Rapids	4	(0)
2005–2010	Rochester Rhinos	122	(0)

Managerial career
- 2011–2013: Western New York Flash (assistant)
- 2014: Rochester Rhinos (assistant)
- 2015: Portland Thorns FC (assistant)
- 2016: Western New York Flash (assistant)
- 2017–2021: North Carolina Courage (assistant)
- * Club domestic league appearances and goals

Scott Vallow (born June 8, 1977, in Modesto, California) is a retired American soccer goalkeeper, most famously for playing with the Rochester Rhinos, 2005–2010. Scott was the assistant coach of the North Carolina Courage soccer team, having followed head coach Paul Riley from the Portland Thorns FC to Western New York Flash and the Courage. He was relieved from his duties on November 19, 2021.

== Career ==
=== College ===
Vallow played college soccer at Bowling Green from 1995 to 1998, where he started all 85 games the team played during his tenure, amassing a .70 goals against average during his career. Vallow, alongside teammate Steve Klein, led Bowling Green to the "Sweet Sixteen" of the NCAA Championships in both 1995 and 1996.

=== Professional ===
Upon graduating, Vallow was signed to a Project-40 contract with Major League Soccer, for the express purpose of playing goalkeeper for the league's USL A-League affiliate. Although he was allocated to the Dallas Burn in August 1999, he saw no time for the team, and was released after the 1999 season. Vallow then signed a contract with the Rochester Raging Rhinos, and immediately took hold of the starting position. Vallow's excellent play helped lead the Rhinos to the 2000 championship, and also resulted in his being named the A-League Goalkeeper of the Year. Vallow returned to the Rhinos in 2001, and his performance was integral in the team winning a second consecutive A-League Championship.

Vallow spent the 2002 season shuttling between the USL and MLS, as he was signed and released by both the New England Revolution and the Dallas Burn; Vallow also played for the Rhinos, making eight appearances and sharing duties with Pat Onstad. Following the 2002 season, Vallow finally made a more permanent move up to the first division, being signed by the Colorado Rapids; although he was with the team for two years, Vallow was employed largely as a backup to Scott Garlick and then Joe Cannon. Vallow played in only four games during his two years with the team. He re-signed with the Rhinos after the 2004 MLS season, where he was the number one keeper, team captain, and fan favorite, announced on the pitch with the "Superman" theme playing at every home game. On October 20, 2009, Vallow extended his contract with the Rhinos for another 2 years. However, he would announce his retirement after only one year, in January 2011, choosing to focus on being an assistant coach for the Western New York Flash of Women's Professional Soccer.

=== Coaching ===
Vallow remained an assistant coach of the Flash through the tenure of Flash head coach Aaran Lines, his former Rochester Rhinos teammate, until the end of the team's inaugural National Women's Soccer League season in 2013. Vallow began dating Flash midfielder McCall Zerboni, left the Flash, and became an assistant coach of the Rochester Rhinos in 2014.

However, in 2015 the Flash traded Zerboni to Portland Thorns FC. The Thorns were coached by Paul Riley at the time, and Riley also hired Vallow to join the Thorns' staff as an assistant. Vallow then followed RIley back to Western New York when Riley was dismissed by Portland at the end of the 2015 season and subsequently hired by the Flash in 2016. (Portland traded Zerboni to the Boston Breakers before the 2016 season, and Boston traded her back to the Flash mid-season.)

In 2016, Vallow managed the team whenever Riley was suspended by officials, which occurred three times during the 2016 season, including most of the team's 2016 semi-finals match against Portland Thorns FC, the entirety of the 2016 NWSL Championship match, and the 2017 NWSL season opener. Vallow himself was ejected during the Courage's May 27, 2017, match against the Chicago Red Stars.

Following the 2021 NWSL abuse scandal involving Riley, Vallow remained on the Courage's coaching staff as an assistant to interim head coach Sean Nahas. However, Vallow was relieved of his duties as assistant coach on November 19, 2021, following what the club described as "individual evaluations and performance-based reviews" of its technical staff.

== Personal life ==
As of October 2016, Vallow was engaged to Western New York Flash midfielder McCall Zerboni. Vallow and Zerboni had to change plans to marry in October when the Flash reached the 2016 NWSL Championship match, also in October. Vallow and Zerboni own a home together in Portland, Oregon.

== Honors ==
=== Rochester Rhinos (player) ===
- USSF Division 2 Pro League Regular Season Champions (1): 2010

=== Western New York Flash (assistant coach) ===
- National Women's Soccer League Championship (1): 2016

=== North Carolina Courage (assistant coach) ===
- National Women's Soccer League Championships (2): 2018, 2019
- National Women's Soccer League Shield (3): 2017, 2018, 2019
- Women's International Champions Cup (1): 2018
