= McCall Zerboni =

American soccer player (born 1986)

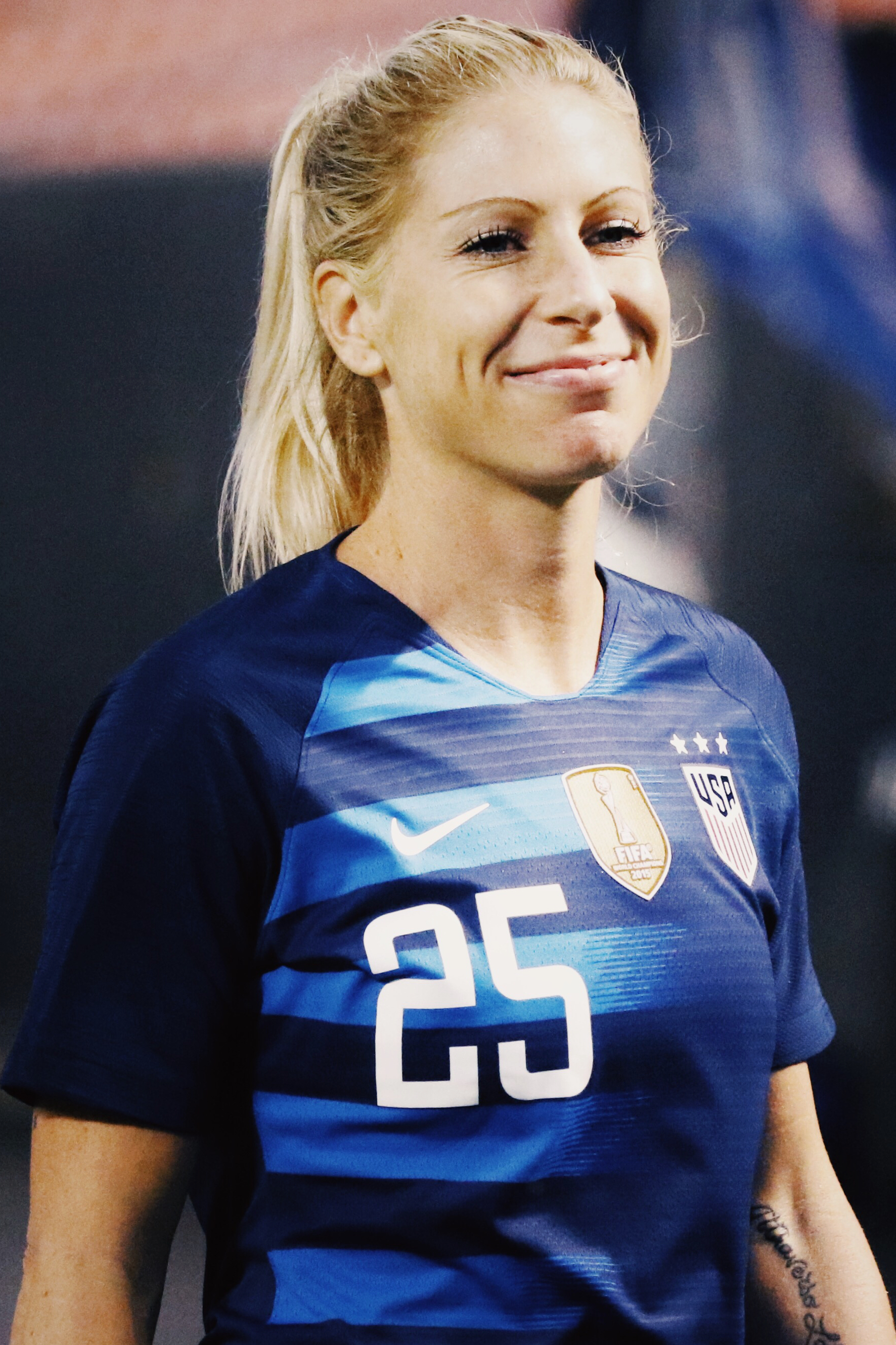
- Zerboni with the United States national team in 2018

Personal information
- Full name: McCall RaNae Zerboni
- Date of birth: December 13, 1986 (age 39)
- Place of birth: Camarillo, California, United States
- Height: 5 ft 4 in (1.63 m)
- Position: Midfielder

Youth career
- 1996–2005: Southern California Blues
- 2000–2002: Clemente Wildcats
- 2003–2004: Laguna Beach Breakers

College career
Years	Team	Apps	(Gls)
2005–2008	UCLA Bruins		

Senior career*
Years	Team	Apps	(Gls)
2007	Vancouver Whitecaps	1	(0)
2009	Los Angeles Sol	10	(0)
2010	Atlanta Beat	20	(0)
2011–2014	Western New York Flash	46	(4)
2015	Portland Thorns FC	18	(2)
2016	Boston Breakers	8	(0)
2016	Western New York Flash	12	(0)
2017–2019	North Carolina Courage	69	(6)
2020–2024	NJ/NY Gotham FC	70	(4)

International career^{‡}
2003	United States U-17		
2017–2019	United States	9	(0)
- * Club domestic league appearances and goals as of March 15, 2025 ‡ National team caps and goals as of April 7, 2019

McCall RaNae Zerboni (born December 13, 1986) is an American professional soccer player who most recently played as a midfielder for NJ/NY Gotham FC of the National Women's Soccer League (NWSL) in 2024. In 2025 she began doing on-screen soccer analysis and commentary.

== Early life ==
Born in Camarillo, California, to parents James and Lindy, Zerboni was a four-year letter-winner at San Clemente High School in San Clemente, California. She was named CIF Offensive Player of the Year during her freshman and sophomore years. She was a three-time South Coast League MVP and four-time first-team All-Orange County selection. In 2005, she was named Gatorade Player of the Year. She was ranked as the number 17 overall recruit and fifth-best midfielder in the nation by Student Sports Magazine.

In addition to her high school playing experience, Zerboni was an Olympic Development Program (ODP) State and Region-IV team member and played club soccer for the Southern California Blues for several years, helping them to League Cup Championships in 2001 and 2002, a Region-IV Championship in 2000 and their first-ever Surf Cup title in 2004.

=== UCLA ===
Zerboni attended UCLA and played for the Bruins women's soccer team from 2005 to 2009. She scored a goal in her first collegiate match at UCLA, a 3–0 opening day victory over Long Beach State in 2005. Zerboni became the 16th player in UCLA history to register a hat trick in a 5–0 victory over Fresno State in the first round of the 2008 NCAA Tournament. She was named MVP for UCLA's 2008 season.

== Club career ==
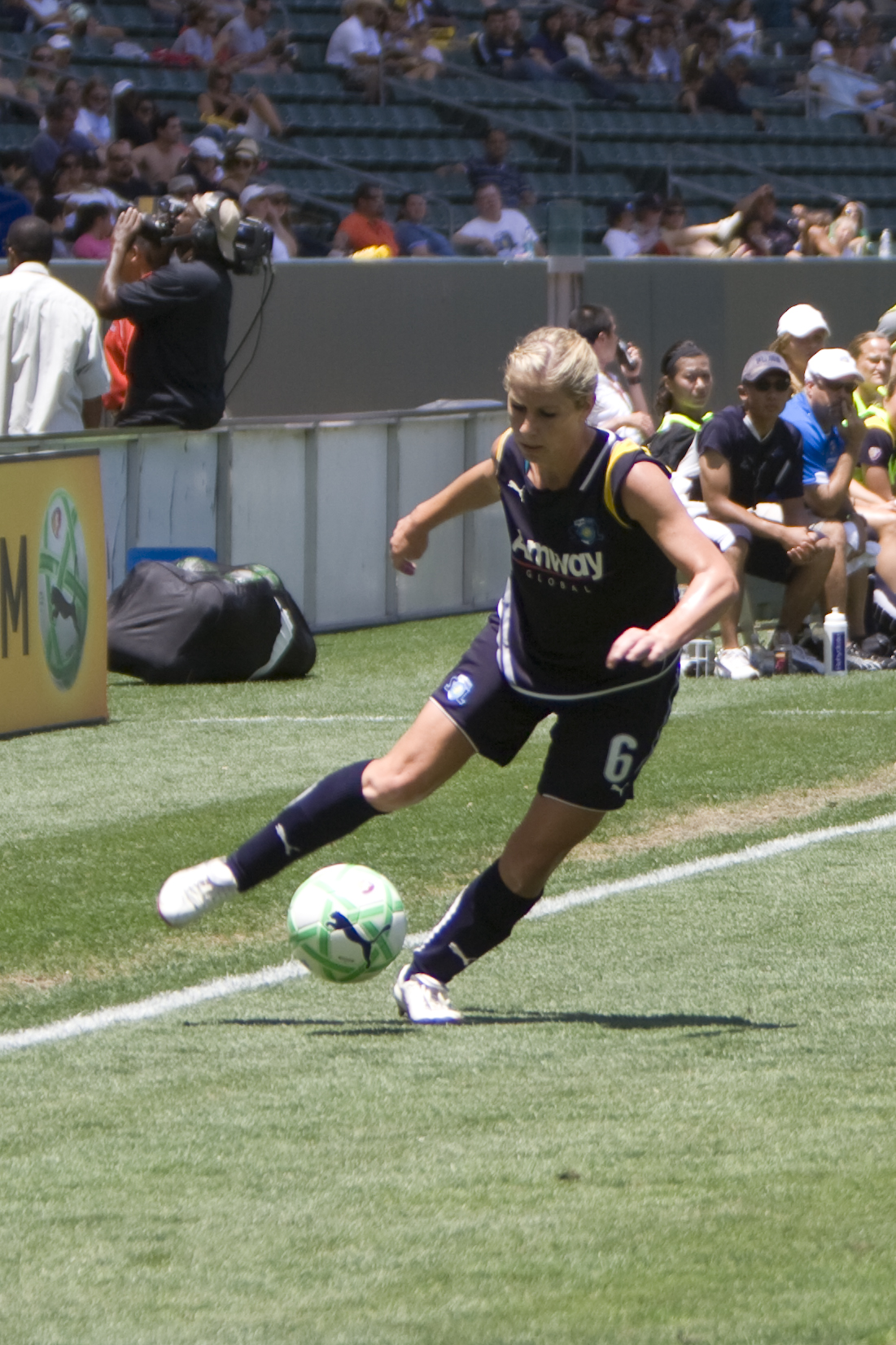
In WPS league, on July 8, 2009

=== Los Angeles Sol (WPS) ===
Zerboni was chosen as the 47th pick overall in the 2009 WPS Draft by the Los Angeles Sol. In her first season with the Sol, she made 10 appearances with four starts, tallying both a goal and an assist.

=== Atlanta Beat (WPS) ===
Zerboni signed to the Atlanta Beat during the 2009 WPS Expansion Draft.

=== Western New York Flash (WPS, WPSL Elite, NWSL) ===
Zerboni signed with the Western New York Flash for the 2011 season.

After the WPS folded in early 2012, Zerboni played for the Western New York Flash in the Women's Premier Soccer League Elite as the team captain.

In January 2013, the Western New York Flash announced that Zerboni would return to the team its inaugural season of the National Women's Soccer League. During the 2013 season Zerboni scored 1 goal in 20 games for the Flash. In her final season with the Flash, she added another 24 appearances of which 23 were starts while playing 2,036 minutes (ranked seventh overall in the league), scoring three goals, and adding a pair of assists.

=== Portland Thorns FC (NWSL) 2015 ===
The Portland Thorns FC acquired Zerboni in a trade alongside Kathryn Williamson in exchange for midfielder Amber Brooks on November 6, 2014 in an attempt to give the team more available full-time players for the coming 2015 season, during which the Thorns anticipated needing to fill in for players called up to the national team to participate in the 2015 FIFA Women's World Cup. During the June 19 match against FC Kansas City, Zerboni stepped on the back of forward Shea Groom and received a two‑game suspension.

=== Boston Breakers (NWSL) 2016 ===
On October 26, 2015, Boston Breakers announced that they had obtained Zerboni from Portland Thorns FC in a package deal along with Sinead Farrelly for first-round (No. 2 overall) and second-round (No. 20 overall) picks in the 2016 National Women's Soccer League College Draft.

She was traded to WNY Flash on June 14, 2016.

=== Western New York Flash, 2016 ===
McCall played the remainder of the 2016 NWSL season with the Western New York Flash, starting in all 11 of her 12 caps. The Western New York Flash won the 2016 NWSL Championship after beating the Washington Spirit in penalties.

=== North Carolina Courage, 2017–2019 ===
It was announced on January 9, 2017, that the Western New York Flash was officially sold to new ownership, moved to North Carolina, and rebranded as the North Carolina Courage. In the 2017 season Zerboni was named to the Team of the Month for July. North Carolina won the 2017 NWSL Shield and advanced to the Championship game, but lost 1–0 to the Portland Thorns. She was named to the 2017 NWSL Best XI.

In 2018 North Carolina repeated as NWSL Shield winners. Zerboni was named to the team of the month in April, May, June & July. She appeared in 20 games for North Carolina. Her 2018 season ended early as she suffered a broken elbow while playing for the U.S WNT in September. As a result, she missed the last regular season game and playoffs. Zerboni was named to the 2018 NWSL Best XI, and was a finalist for the Most Valuable Player Award.

=== Gotham FC, 2020–2024 ===
On January 10, 2020, Zerboni was traded to Gotham FC (then called Sky Blue FC) for the rights to Hailie Mace. Zerboni tore her ACL during a game at San Diego Wave on August 19, 2023. She made a successful return on June 8, 2024 in a home game against Angel City FC, coming on in the 77th minute and assuming the captain’s armband.

On January 2, 2025, Zerboni was released by Gotham FC and has not been signed by another team. Although Zerboni has not publicly announced her retirement, it was subsequently referenced by the NWSL.

== International career ==
In 2003, Zerboni was a member of the United States women's national under-17 soccer team.

On October 20, 2017, Zerboni was called up to the United States senior team. She made her debut as a halftime substitute against South Korea on October 22, 2017, making her the oldest player to earn a first cap for the U.S. women's national team at two months shy of her 31st birthday. She continued to receive call-ups in 2018 and was named to the roster for the 2018 Tournament of Nations. Zerboni suffered a broken elbow in a friendly against Chile on September 4, making her unavailable for the 2018 CONCACAF Women's Championship. She returned to senior team training camps in January 2019.

== Analyst ==
Starting with the 2025 NWSL Season, Zerboni has been an analyst for the streaming service NWSL+ and commentator on the league.

== Personal life ==
Zerboni has a twin sister, Blake Zerboni.

She was previously in a relationship with Scott Vallow.

On October 12, 2011, Zerboni was arrested for a DWI in Rochester, NY.

== Career statistics ==
=== International ===
Appearances and goals by national team and year
National team	Year	Apps	Goals
United States	2017	1	0
United States	2018	6	0
United States	2019	2	0
Total		9	0

== Honors ==
Western New York Flash

- NWSL Shield: 2013
- NWSL Champions: 2016

North Carolina Courage

- NWSL Champions: 2018, 2019
- NWSL Shield: 2017, 2018, 2019

NJ/NY Gotham FC

- NWSL Championship: 2023

United States

- Tournament of Nations: 2018

Individual

- NWSL Best XI: 2017, 2018
