= Carli Lloyd =

American soccer player (born 1982)

- Lloyd in 2015

Personal information
- Full name: Carli Anne Hollins
- Birth name: Carli Anne Lloyd
- Date of birth: July 16, 1982 (age 44)
- Place of birth: Delran Township, New Jersey, U.S.
- Height: 5 ft 7 in (1.70 m)
- Positions: Midfielder; forward

College career
Years	Team	Apps	(Gls)
2001–2004	Rutgers Scarlet Knights	83	(50)

Senior career*
Years	Team	Apps	(Gls)
1999	Central Jersey Splash		(11)
2000	New Brunswick Power		(10)
2001	South Jersey Banshees		(10)
2004	New Jersey Wildcats	1	(1)
2009	Chicago Red Stars	16	(2)
2010	Sky Blue FC (Note: The club has been called Jersey Sky Blue (2006–2008), Sky Blue FC (2008–2020), NJ/NY Gotham FC (2021–2024) and Gotham FC (2025–present).)	5	(0)
2011	Atlanta Beat	10	(2)
2013–2014	Western New York Flash	34	(16)
2015–2017	Houston Dash	27	(11)
2017	→ Manchester City (loan)	6	(2)
2018–2021	NJ/NY Gotham FC	33	(13)

International career^{‡}
2002–2005	United States U21		
2005–2021	United States	316	(134)
Medal record
Women's soccer
Representing United States
Olympic Games
Gold medal – first place	2008 Beijing	Team
Gold medal – first place	2012 London	Team
Bronze medal – third place	2020 Tokyo	Team
FIFA Women's World Cup
Winner	2015 Canada
Winner	2019 France
Runner-up	2011 Germany
Bronze medal – third place	2007 China
- * Club domestic league appearances and goals as of April 29, 2019 ‡ National team caps and goals as of October 26, 2021

Carli Anne Hollins (née Lloyd; born July 16, 1982) is an American former professional soccer player. She won the 2015 and 2019 editions of the FIFA Women's World Cup with the United States, finished second at the 2011 FIFA Women's World Cup, and scored the gold medal-winning goals in the finals of the 2008 Olympics and the 2012 Olympics. She also won the bronze medal with the U.S. at the 2020 Olympics. She was named FIFA Player of the Year in 2015 and 2016.

Lloyd made 316 appearances for the U.S. national team, placing her second in caps. She ranks third in goals and fifth in assists for the team. During the United States' 5–2 win over Japan in the 2015 Women's World Cup Final, Lloyd became the first player in history to score three goals in a Women's World Cup final and the second player of any gender to score a hat-trick in a World Cup Final. At the conclusion of the tournament, she received the Golden Ball, the Silver Boot and the Best Goal awards.

During her club career, Lloyd played for the Chicago Red Stars, Sky Blue FC and the Atlanta Beat in the Women's Professional Soccer (WPS) league. In the National Women's Soccer League (NWSL), she won the league championship with the Western New York Flash, and also played for the Houston Dash and Gotham FC. In 2019, Lloyd was the highest paid female soccer player in the world. Her memoir, When Nobody Was Watching, was published in 2016.

== Early life ==
Born to Stephen and Pamela Lloyd, Carli was raised in Delran Township, a suburban community in New Jersey. She has a brother, Stephen, and a sister, Ashley. She began playing soccer at age five. At age 17, she attended the opening U.S. match of the 1999 FIFA Women's World Cup at nearby Giants Stadium, which inspired her to play for the national team.

== High school career ==
Lloyd attended Delran High School from 1997 to 2001, where she played soccer under the tutelage of Rudy Klobach. As a high school athlete, she was known for her exceptional ball control and skill at distributing the ball from the midfield. During her senior year, she scored 26 goals and served eight assists while captaining her team to an 18–3 record. The Philadelphia Inquirer named her Girls' High School Player of the Year in 1999 and 2000. She was named to the Star-Ledger All-State First Team twice and received 1999 and 2000 Parade All-American honors. In 2000, she was named the Courier-Post Player of the Year and the South Jersey Soccer Coaches Association (SJSCA) Midfielder of the Year. While in high school, Lloyd also played for the semi-professional W-League teams Central Jersey Splash (1999), New Brunswick Power (2000), and South Jersey Banshees (2001).

== College career ==
Lloyd attended Rutgers University from 2001 to 2005, and played for the Scarlet Knights women's soccer team under head coach Glenn Crooks. During her freshman season, she started every match and was the team's leading scorer with 15 goals. She was named to Soccer America's All-Freshman Team and was the first Rutgers player to earn Big East Rookie of the Year honors. As a sophomore, Lloyd was the team's leading scorer for the second consecutive season, with 12 goals and seven assists. The same year, she was a finalist for the Hermann Trophy, widely considered the highest accolade for collegiate soccer players. During her third season with the Scarlet Knights, she scored 13 goals and served 2 assists, and was named a Big East Academic All-Star.

In the summer of 2004—just prior to her senior year—Lloyd played one match for the semi-professional W-League team New Jersey Wildcats. As a senior at Rutgers, she scored 10 goals and served one assist. She was named the 2004 Big East Midfielder of the Year, and was the first Rutgers athlete to be named First-Team All-Big East for four consecutive years. Lloyd ended her college career as the school's all-time leader in points (117), goals (50), and shots. She graduated with a bachelor's degree in Exercise Science and Sport Studies. In 2013, she was inducted into the Rutgers Hall of Distinguished Alumni.

== Club career ==
=== 2009–2011: Women's Professional Soccer ===
In 2008, Lloyd signed with the Chicago Red Stars of the newly launched Women's Professional Soccer league. During the league's inaugural season, she scored two goals: one during her team's 4–0 win over the Boston Breakers on April 25, and the other during a 3–1 victory over the Los Angeles Sol on August 2. (Note: Attributed to multiple references:) The Red Stars finished the season in sixth place in the league, with a 5–10–5 record. Lloyd was a free agent for the upcoming 2010 season; she signed with her home state club, Sky Blue FC, winner of the 2009 WPS championship. In April 2010, Lloyd slipped and broke her ankle during a match against the Red Stars. The injury kept her off the field until September, when she returned for two games.

In December 2010, Lloyd signed with the expansion team Atlanta Beat for the 2011 season. The team's head coach James Galanis described Lloyd as a "fantastic midfielder", and said he expected her to bring professionalism to the team. The Beat finished their first season in last place with a 1–13–4 record, with Lloyd scoring two goals in ten appearances. (Note: Attributed to multiple references:)

=== 2013–2014: Western New York Flash ===
In January 2013, Lloyd joined the Western New York Flash in the new National Women's Soccer League as part of the NWSL Player Allocation. After recovering from a shoulder injury suffered earlier in the year, Lloyd made her debut for the Flash on May 12, during the team's 2–1 win over FC Kansas City. She scored her first goal for the Flash in a match against her former club, Sky Blue FC, as the Flash won 3–0. During a match against the Washington Spirit on June 28, Lloyd scored a hat trick as the Flash achieved a 4–0 victory. She was named NWSL Player of the Week for her performance.

Lloyd finished the 2013 season with 10 goals, the third-highest goal total in the league. The Flash finished first in league play during the regular season with a 10–4–8 record, and advanced to the playoffs. During the Flash's semifinal match against Sky Blue, Lloyd scored two goals to secure a 2–0 win. The Flash were defeated 2–0 by the Portland Thorns FC in the championship final.

=== 2015–2017: Houston Dash and Manchester City ===
On October 16, 2014, Lloyd was traded to the Houston Dash in exchange for Becky Edwards, Whitney Engen and a third-round pick in the 2016 NWSL College Draft.

In February 2017, Lloyd joined the English club Manchester City on loan, for the FA WSL Spring Series. The club finished second in the Spring Series and won the 2016–17 FA Women's Cup. Lloyd scored a goal in the final, a 4–1 victory over Birmingham City. Lloyd's final appearance for City came on May 21, when she was ejected from the game for elbowing an opposing player in the face. The three-match ban she received for violent conduct covered the remainder of her loan period.

=== 2018–2021: Sky Blue FC (Gotham FC) ===
In January 2018, Lloyd was traded to Sky Blue FC, whose name would be changed to NJ/NY Gotham FC in 2021. Lloyd scored 4 goals in 18 appearances for the team in 2018, including the only goal in a 1–0 victory over the Orlando Pride, which was Sky Blue's sole win of the season. She was named to the 2018 NWSL Second XI.

== International career ==
=== Youth national team ===
Lloyd represented the United States on the under-21 team from 2002 to 2005. She played at the Nordic Cup four times, winning consecutive titles from 2002 to 2005 in Finland, Denmark, Iceland, and Sweden respectively. During the first round of the 2003 Nordic Cup, she served the assist in her team's 1–0 win against Denmark. At the 2004 edition, she scored two goals and served one assist. At the 2005 edition, she scored three times, including one goal during the championship match against Norway.

=== Senior national team ===
Lloyd made her first appearance for the United States women's national soccer team on July 10, 2005, against Ukraine. She scored her first international goal on October 1, 2006, against Taiwan. She first made the starting lineup at the 2006 Algarve Cup, when she started in a group match against Denmark and in the final against Germany.

==== 2007: Algarve Cup and FIFA Women's World Cup ====
After scoring once in her first 24 matches with the national team, Lloyd scored four goals at the 2007 Algarve Cup, held in March in Portugal. As the tournament's top scorer, she was named Most Valuable Player. (Note: Attributed to multiple references:) In August, she registered her first two-goal game for the national team during a 6–1 win against New Zealand. In September, Lloyd played in her first Women's World Cup, held in China. The U.S. team finished third in the tournament, with Lloyd starting in three of the five games in which she played. During 2007, Lloyd started in 13 of her 23 matches. She ranked third on the team in scoring, with nine goals and three assists.

==== 2008 Summer Olympics in China ====
During the championship match of the CONCACAF Women's Olympic Qualifying Tournament, Lloyd scored one goal as the U.S. tied with Canada, eventually defeating them in a penalty shootout. Before Lloyd left for China to play in the 2008 Summer Olympics, the mayor of Delran Township—Lloyd's hometown—gave her a key to the city and announced that several soccer fields would be named after her. During the group stage of the Olympics, she scored the only goal in her team's 1–0 defeat of Japan. In the final against Brazil, she scored the game-winning goal in extra time to secure a 1–0 victory and the gold medal for the United States. Lloyd was named the 2008 U.S. Soccer Athlete of the Year along with Tim Howard. She was on the starting lineup in all 35 games in which she played in 2008. Her nine goals and nine assists resulted in her best scoring year yet on the national team.

==== 2009–2010: World Cup qualifying and 100th international appearance ====
At the 2010 Algarve Cup, Lloyd scored the game-opening goal in the final, helping the U.S. defeat Germany 3–2 and win the trophy. She scored two goals and served five assists at the 2010 CONCACAF Women's World Cup Qualifying Tournament, and was named the Player of the Match three times. After the U.S. finished third at the tournament, they played in the UEFA-CONCACAF play-off against Italy to compete for a berth at the 2011 FIFA Women's World Cup. Lloyd scored three goals and served five assists during the two-match series, which saw the U.S. defeat Italy and qualify for the World Cup. Lloyd earned her 100th cap during the series.

==== 2011: Algarve Cup, Four Nations Tournament, and FIFA Women's World Cup ====
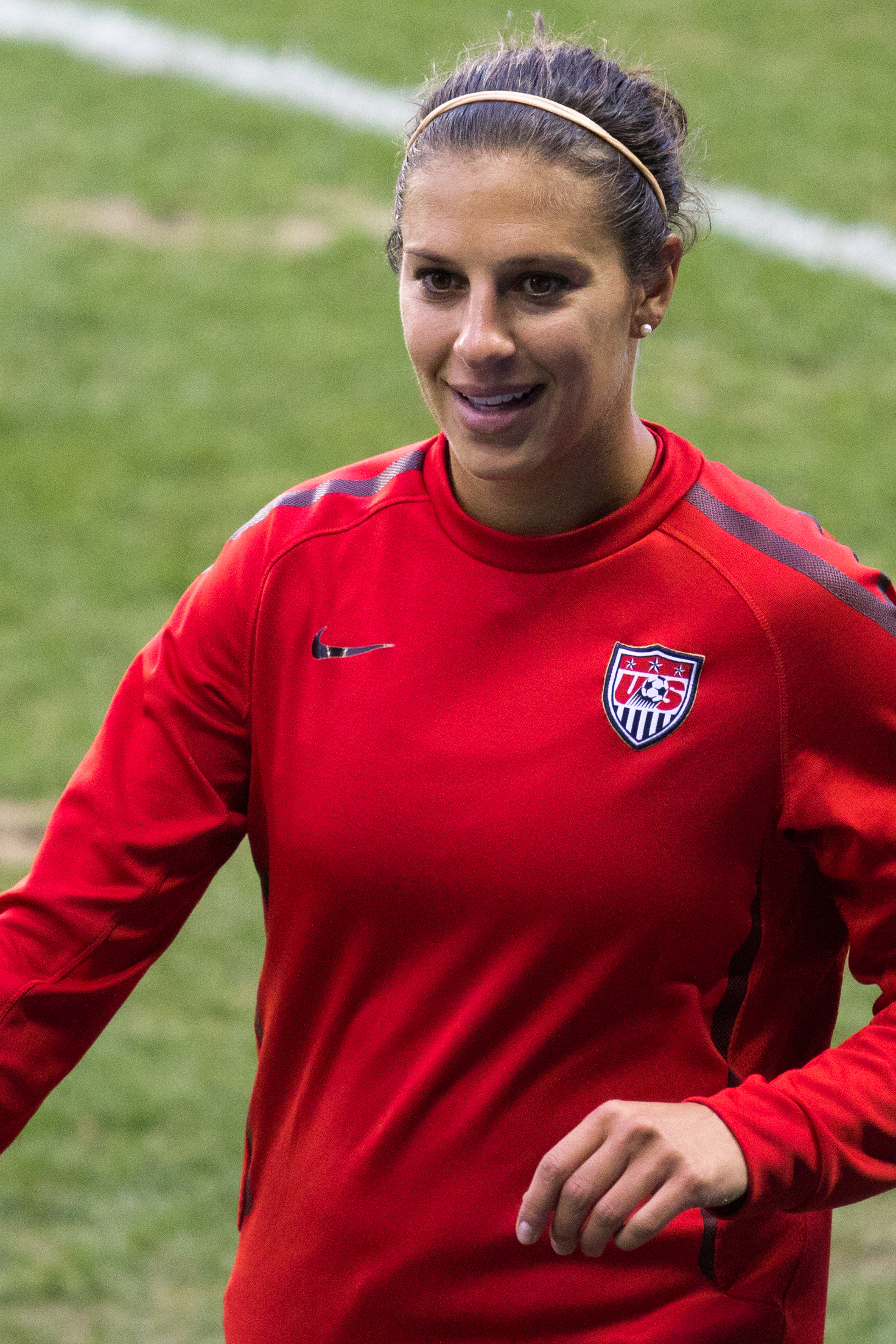
Lloyd with the United States women's national soccer team in 2011

In 2011, the U.S. team was training for the Women's World Cup, starting with the Four Nations Tournament. Lloyd scored two goals in the tournament, including one during a 2–0 victory over Canada in the championship match, which resulted in her being named Player of the Match. At the 2011 Algarve Cup, Lloyd scored three goals. Her goal in the championship match—in which the U.S. achieved a 4–2 victory over Iceland—was selected as the best goal of the tournament. Lloyd earned a second Algarve Cup Player of the Match award for her performance.

At the Women's World Cup, Lloyd scored her first-ever World Cup goal in a 3–0 win over Colombia in the group stage. During the tournament, she also tallied an assist and a penalty goal in the quarterfinal shootout against Brazil. The U.S. was defeated in the final against Japan, winning the silver medal. (Note: Attributed to multiple references:)

==== 2012 Summer Olympics in London ====
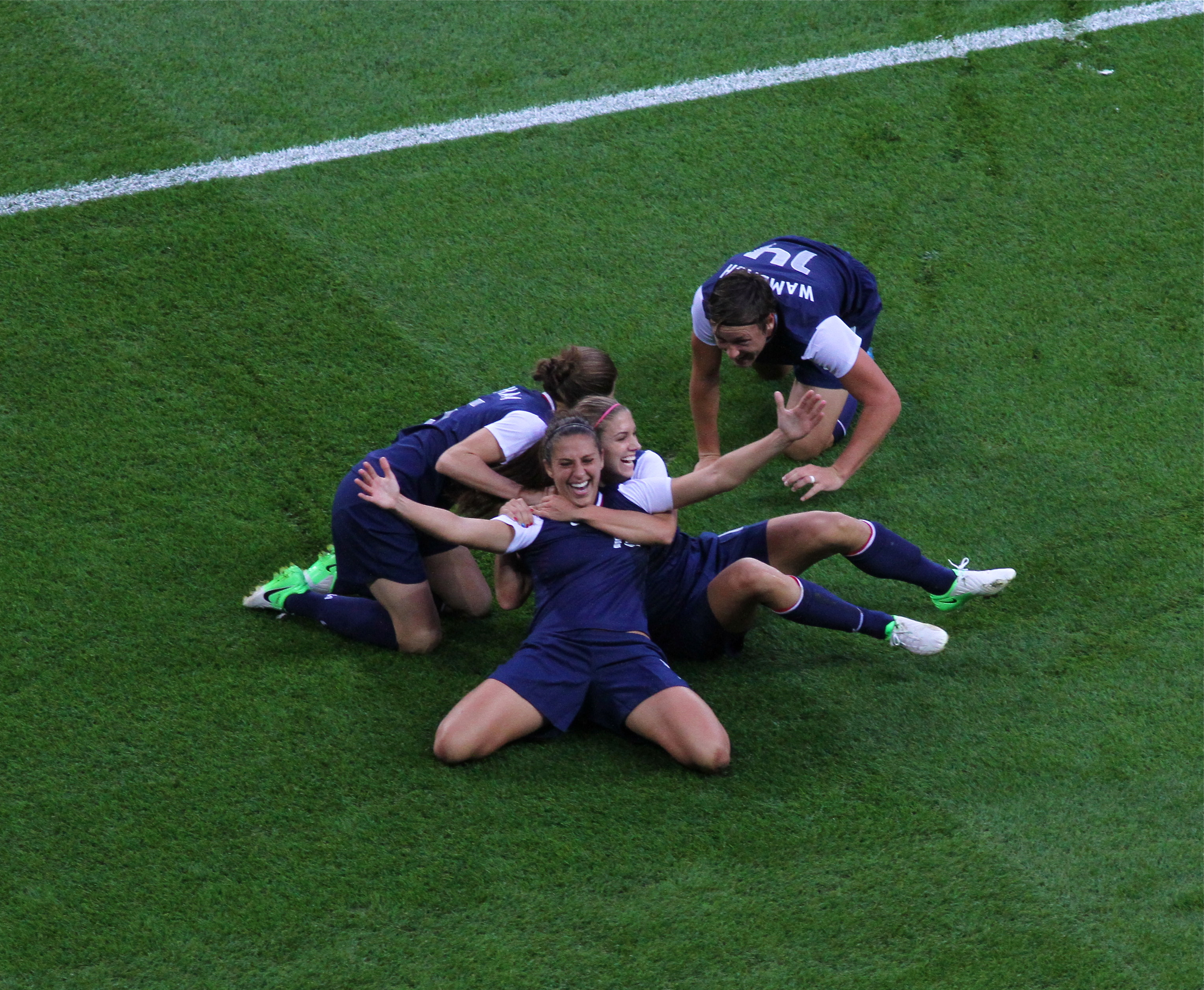
Lloyd celebrates with her teammates after scoring a goal at the 2012 Summer Olympics.

The national team opened 2012 with the Olympic Qualifiers in Canada. In their first group stage match, the U.S. defeated the Dominican Republic 14–0 with Lloyd tallying one goal and one assist. In the second match, the U.S. achieved a 13–0 victory over Guatemala, with Lloyd scoring once and providing an assist. In the final group match, the U.S. prevailed over Mexico 4–0, with Lloyd achieving her first career hat-trick. She was subsequently named Player of the Match. In the semifinal, the U.S. achieved a 3–0 win over Costa Rica, with Lloyd scoring one goal. She was named Player of the Match for the second game in a row. In the final, Lloyd's team defeated Canada 4–0 to qualify for the Olympics as the CONCACAF champions. Lloyd finished the tournament with six goals and three assists, and was the joint-top goalscorer for the United States.

At the 2012 Summer Olympics in London, Lloyd scored a goal during her team's opening group match against France, which the U.S. won 4–2. She scored her second goal of the tournament in the second group match against Colombia as the U.S. won 3–0. During the final against Japan, Lloyd scored both U.S. goals in a 2–1 victory. (Note: Attributed to multiple references:) She is the only player of any gender to score the game-winning goal in two separate Olympic gold medal matches; her first occurred during the 2008 final in Beijing .

After scoring her 46th international goal during a friendly against New Zealand in October 2013, Lloyd surpassed Julie Foudy to become the highest-scoring midfielder in the history of the women's national team.

==== 2015 FIFA Women's World Cup ====
Lloyd captained the national team during four matches of the 2015 FIFA Women's World Cup in Canada. During the quarterfinal against China, she scored the winning goal in her 200th international appearance. In the final against Japan, she scored a hat-trick within the first 16 minutes. Her last goal was scored from just past the halfway line, and was hailed by Simon Evans of Reuters as "one of the most remarkable goals ever witnessed in a Women's World Cup". The goal earned Lloyd a nomination for the FIFA Puskás Award. The U.S. defeated Japan 5–2, becoming the first nation to win the Women's World Cup three times.

Video
- Lloyd's halfway-line goal on YouTube

Lloyd won the Golden Ball as the best player of the tournament. While her six goals were enough to match Célia Šašić as the tournament's top scorer, Šašić won the Golden Boot for playing fewer minutes, which meant Lloyd was awarded the Silver Boot. Lloyd became the first woman to score a hat-trick in a World Cup final and the first player of any gender to do so since Geoff Hurst in 1966. She is the only player who has scored a hat-trick in regulation time in a World Cup final.

Following the U.S. victory at the World Cup, Lloyd and her teammates became the first women's sports team to be honored with a ticker tape parade in New York City. Each player received a key to the city from Mayor Bill de Blasio. In October of the same year, the team was honored by President Barack Obama at the White House.

==== 2016 Summer Olympics in Rio de Janeiro ====
Lloyd scored the first goal for the U.S. at the 2016 Summer Olympics in Rio de Janeiro, Brazil. Her goal helped lift the U.S. to a 2–0 win over New Zealand in the group stage.

==== 2019 FIFA Women's World Cup ====
Lloyd scored in her first two games of the 2019 FIFA Women's World Cup: one against Thailand and two against Chile. She became the first player to score in six straight Women's World Cup matches.

==== 2021: 300th international appearance and Tokyo Olympics ====
On April 10, 2021, Lloyd appeared in her 300th international game, a friendly match against Sweden. She became the third soccer player of any gender to earn 300 international caps, after Kristine Lilly and Christie Pearce. Lloyd would finish her career with 316 international caps; she currently ranks third all-time in caps behind Lilly and Christine Sinclair. On June 14, the 38-year-old Lloyd became the oldest player to score for the United States, during a 4–0 win over Jamaica.

At the Summer Olympics in Tokyo, Lloyd scored twice in a 4–3 win over Australia in the bronze medal match. With 10 Olympic goals in total, Lloyd surpassed Abby Wambach for the most Olympic goals scored by a USWNT player. Following the Olympics, Lloyd announced she would be retiring from the national team later in the year.

== Style of play ==
At the beginning of her career, Lloyd was criticized for being inconsistent and for easily losing possession of the ball. However, she eventually developed into one of the best players in the world, and was highly regarded for her determination, mental strength, and work ethic. A tenacious and energetic player, she also was known for her control, technique, and passing accuracy. She was capable of aiding her team both defensively and offensively, due to her stamina, strength, and tackling, as well as her ability to get into good attacking positions, from which she could either score goals or create chances for teammates. (Note: Attributed to multiple references:) These abilities, coupled with her tactical versatility, enabled her to be deployed in several midfield positions; although she began her career in the center, as a defensive midfielder, she was most comfortable when moved used as an attacking midfielder behind the forwards. Because of her tendency to score decisive goals, Lloyd earned a reputation as a "clutch player". A powerful striker of the ball, she was capable of scoring from any position on the field.

== Endorsements ==
During her career, Lloyd had endorsement deals or partnerships with Nike, (Note: Attributed to multiple references:) Visa, Whole Foods Market, Lifeway Foods, United Airlines, Krave Jerky, Beats by Dre, Kind, and NJM Insurance. She appeared in commercials for Xfinity and Heineken.

== In popular culture ==
Lloyd has been featured in the magazines Glamour, Shape, and Sports Illustrated. She was on the cover of Howler Magazine. In 2012, she appeared in an ESPN feature called Title IX is Mine: USWNT. She has been interviewed on the television shows Good Morning America, The Daily Show with Jon Stewart, Live with Kelly and Michael, The Today Show, Late Night with Seth Meyers, Fox & Friends, and the Late Late Show with James Corden. Lloyd participated in the 2023 reality show Special Forces: World's Toughest Test. She joined Soccer on Fox Sports as a studio analyst in 2022. She has appeared in the FIFA video game series.

== Other activities ==
=== Criticism of the national team ===
Since retiring, Lloyd has made critical comments regarding the national team, saying she hated playing for the team in the final years of her career. She said the team culture became "toxic" after the 2015 Women's World Cup victory, and alleged that players became more focused on building their brands than winning as a team. During the 2023 Women's World Cup, Lloyd criticized the team for celebrating after finishing runners-up in their group; she said the second-place finish was "not good enough." Lloyd's comments drew pushback from both current players and several of her former teammates.

Later in 2023, she said U.S. Soccer never wanted her to be the star of the team. “That's just the way the world works as far as showcasing players," Lloyd said. "They're not always highlighting the best players. They're oftentimes highlighting the most marketable players.”

=== CL10 Soccer Clinic, World Cup draws and Teqball ===
Lloyd developed CL10 Soccer Clinic, a program to help players improve their skills. In 2022, she co-conducted the draws for the 2022 FIFA World Cup and the 2023 FIFA Women's World Cup. The same year, she partnered with Teqball USA as part of an effort to make Teqball an Olympic sport by 2028.

== Personal life ==
Lloyd lives with her husband, golfer Brian Hollins, in Medford, New Jersey. They married on November 4, 2016, in Puerto Morelos, Mexico. On October 18, 2024, Lloyd gave birth to a girl, and the couple are expecting their second child in September 2026. Lloyd's memoir, When Nobody Was Watching, was published in 2016.

== Career statistics ==
=== International goals ===
Scores and results list the United States' goal tally first, score column indicates score after each Lloyd goal.

List of international goals scored by Carli Lloyd
No.	Date	Venue	Opponent	Score	Result	Competition	Ref.
1	October 1, 2006	Carson	Chinese Taipei	8–0	10–0	Friendly	
2	March 7, 2007	Silves	China	2–1	2–1	Algarve Cup: Group B	
3	March 9, 2007	Ferreiras	Finland	1–0	1–0	Algarve Cup: Group B	
4	March 12, 2007	Santo António	Sweden	2–0	3–2	Algarve Cup: Group B	
5	March 14, 2007	Santo António	Denmark	2–0	2–0	Algarve Cup: Final	
6	July 14, 2007	East Hartford	Norway	1–0	1–0	Friendly	
7	August 12, 2007	Chicago	New Zealand	3–0	6–1	Friendly	
8	August 12, 2007	Chicago	New Zealand	5–0	6–1	Friendly	
9	October 13, 2007	St. Louis	Mexico	5–1	5–1	Friendly	
10	October 17, 2007	Portland	Mexico	4–0	4–0	Friendly	
11	March 5, 2008	Albufeira	China	4–0	4–0	Algarve Cup: Group B	
12	April 4, 2008	Juárez	Jamaica	1–0	6–0	Olympic qualifier: Group A	
13	April 13, 2008	Juárez	Canada	1–0	1–1	Olympic qualifier: final	
14	April 27, 2008	Cary	Australia	3–1	3–1	Friendly	
15	May 10, 2008	Washington	Canada	4–0	6–0	Friendly	
16	July 2, 2008	Fredrikstad	Norway	2–0	4–0	Friendly	
17	July 5, 2008	Skellefteå	Sweden	1–0	1–0	Friendly	
18	August 9, 2008	Qinhuangdao	Japan	1–0	1–0	Olympics: Group G	
19	August 21, 2008	Beijing	Brazil	1–0	1–0	Olympics: gold medal match	
20	March 3, 2010	Faro	Germany	1–0	3–2	Algarve Cup: final	
21	October 30, 2010	Cancún	Guatemala	8–0	9–0	World Cup qualifier: Group B	
22	November 5, 2010	Cancún	Mexico	1–1	1–2	World Cup qualifier: semifinal	
23	January 21, 2011	Chongqing	Sweden	1–0	1–2	Four Nations Tournament	
24	January 25, 2011	Chongqing	China	1–0	2–0	Four Nations Tournament	
25	March 4, 2011	Santo António	Norway	2–0	2–0	Algarve Cup: Group A	
26	March 7, 2011	Quarteira	Finland	2–0	4–0	Algarve Cup: Group A	
27	March 9, 2011	Faro	Iceland	1–0	4–2	Algarve Cup: final	
28	July 2, 2011	Sinsheim	Colombia	3–0	3–0	World Cup: Group C	
29	January 20, 2012	Vancouver	Dominican Republic	2–0	14–0	Olympic qualifier: Group B	
30	January 22, 2012	Vancouver	Guatemala	5–0	13–0	Olympic qualifier: Group B	
31	January 24, 2012	Vancouver	Mexico	1–0	4–0	Olympic qualifier: Group B	
32	January 24, 2012	Vancouver	Mexico	3–0	4–0	Olympic qualifier: Group B	
33	January 24, 2012	Vancouver	Mexico	4–0	4–0	Olympic qualifier: Group B	
34	January 27, 2012	Vancouver	Costa Rica	2–0	3–0	Olympic qualifier: semifinal	
35	February 29, 2012	Lagos	Denmark	3–0	5–0	Algarve Cup: Group B	
36	April 3, 2012	Chiba	Brazil	1–0	3–0	Kirin Challenge Cup	
37	July 25, 2012	Glasgow	France	3–2	4–2	Olympics: Group G	
38	July 28, 2012	Glasgow	Colombia	3–0	3–0	Olympics: Group G	
39	August 9, 2012	London	Japan	1–0	2–1	Olympics: gold medal match	
40	August 9, 2012	London	Japan	2–0	2–1	Olympics: gold medal match	
41	September 1, 2012	Rochester	Costa Rica	7–0	8–0	Friendly	
42	December 8, 2012	Detroit	China	1–0	2–0	Friendly	
43	December 12, 2012	Houston	China	2–0	4–0	Friendly	
44	June 15, 2013	Foxborough	South Korea	3–1	4–1	Friendly	
45	October 20, 2013	San Antonio	Australia	2–0	4–0	Friendly	
46	October 27, 2013	San Francisco	New Zealand	2–0	4–1	Friendly	
47	February 8, 2014	Boca Raton	Russia	1–0	7–0	Friendly	
48	February 8, 2014	Boca Raton	Russia	3–0	7–0	Friendly	
49	April 10, 2014	San Diego	China	1–0	3–0	Friendly	
50	April 10, 2014	San Diego	China	2–0	3–0	Friendly	
51	August 20, 2014	Cary	Switzerland	2–0	4–1	Friendly	
52	October 17, 2014	Chicago	Guatemala	2–0	5–0	World Cup qualifier: Group A	
53	October 20, 2014	Washington	Haiti	1–0	6–0	World Cup qualifier: Group A	
54	October 24, 2014	Chester	Mexico	1–0	3–0	World Cup qualifier: semifinal	
55	October 24, 2014	Chester	Mexico	2–0	3–0	World Cup qualifier: semifinal	
56	October 26, 2014	Chester	Costa Rica	2–0	6–0	CONCACAF Championship: final	
57	December 10, 2014	Brasília	China	1–0	1–1	Tournament of Brasilia	
58	December 14, 2014	Brasília	Brazil	1–0	2–3	Tournament of Brasilia	
59	December 18, 2014	Brasília	Argentina	3–0	7–0	Tournament of Brasilia	
60	December 18, 2014	Brasília	Argentina	5–0	7–0	Tournament of Brasilia	
61	December 18, 2014	Brasília	Argentina	6–0	7–0	Tournament of Brasilia	
62	March 4, 2015	Santo António	Norway	1–1	2–1	Algarve Cup: Group B	
63	March 4, 2015	Santo António	Norway	2–1	2–1	Algarve Cup: Group B	
64	June 23, 2015	Edmonton	Colombia	2–0	2–0	World Cup: round of 16	
65	June 26, 2015	Ottawa	China	1–0	1–0	World Cup: quarter final	
66	June 30, 2015	Montreal	Germany	1–0	2–0	World Cup: semi final	
67	July 5, 2015	Vancouver	Japan	1–0	5–2	World Cup: final	
68	July 5, 2015	Vancouver	Japan	2–0	5–2	World Cup: final	
69	July 5, 2015	Vancouver	Japan	4–0	5–2	World Cup: final	
70	August 19, 2015	Chattanooga	Costa Rica	1–0	7–2	Friendly	
71	August 19, 2015	Chattanooga	Costa Rica	4–0	7–2	Friendly	
72	September 17, 2015	Detroit	Haiti	1–0	5–0	Friendly	
73	September 17, 2015	Detroit	Haiti	3–0	5–0	Friendly	
74	September 17, 2015	Detroit	Haiti	4–0	5–0	Friendly	
75	September 20, 2015	Birmingham	Haiti	2–0	8–0	Friendly	
76	September 20, 2015	Birmingham	Haiti	4–0	8–0	Friendly	
77	September 20, 2015	Birmingham	Haiti	5–0	8–0	Friendly	
78	October 21, 2015	Seattle	Brazil	1–1	1–1	Friendly	
79	December 10, 2015	San Antonio	Trinidad and Tobago	1–0	6–0	Friendly	
80	January 23, 2016	San Diego	Republic of Ireland	1–0	5–0	Friendly	
81	January 23, 2016	San Diego	Republic of Ireland	2–0	5–0	Friendly	
82	January 23, 2016	San Diego	Republic of Ireland	3–0	5–0	Friendly	
83	February 10, 2016	Frisco	Costa Rica	2–0	5–0	Olympic Qualifier – Group A	
84	February 13, 2016	Frisco	Mexico	1–0	1–0	Olympic Qualifier – Group A	
85	February 15, 2016	Frisco	Puerto Rico	2–0	10–0	Olympic Qualifier – Group A	
86	February 19, 2016	Houston	Trinidad and Tobago	3–0	5–0	Olympic Qualifier – semi-final	
87	April 6, 2016	East Hartford	Colombia	4–0	7–0	Friendly	
88	July 23, 2016	Kansas City	Costa Rica	3–0	4–0	Friendly	
89	August 3, 2016	Belo Horizonte	New Zealand	1–0	2–0	Olympics: Group G	
90	August 6, 2016	Belo Horizonte	France	1–0	1–0	Olympics: Group G	
91	September 15, 2016	Columbus	Thailand	1–0	9–0	Friendly	
92	September 15, 2016	Columbus	Thailand	5–0	9–0	Friendly	
93	September 15, 2016	Columbus	Thailand	7–0	9–0	Friendly	
94	September 18, 2016	Atlanta	Netherlands	1–1	3–1	Friendly	
95	October 23, 2016	Minneapolis	Switzerland	1–1	5–1	Friendly	
96	October 23, 2016	Minneapolis	Switzerland	2–1	5–1	Friendly	
97	April 9, 2017	Houston	Russia	1–0	5–1	Friendly	
98	November 12, 2017	San Jose	Canada	3–1	3–1	Friendly	
99	April 5, 2018	Jacksonville, Florida	Mexico	4–0	4–1	Friendly	
100	April 8, 2018	Houston, Texas	Mexico	3–2	6–2	Friendly	
101	September 4, 2018	San Jose	Chile	3–0	4–0	Friendly	
102	September 4, 2018	San Jose	Chile	4–0	4–0	Friendly	
103	October 7, 2018	Cary	Panama	1–0	5–0	2018 CONCACAF Championship	
104	October 7, 2018	Cary	Panama	3–0	5–0	2018 CONCACAF Championship	
105	October 7, 2018	Cary	Panama	5–0	5–0	2018 CONCACAF Championship	
106	April 7, 2019	Los Angeles	Belgium	1–0	6–0	Friendly	
107	April 7, 2019	Los Angeles	Belgium	2–0	6–0	Friendly	
108	May 12, 2019	Santa Clara	South Africa	3–0	3–0	Friendly	
109	May 16, 2019	St. Louis, Missouri	New Zealand	3–0	5–0	Friendly	
110	May 16, 2019	St. Louis, Missouri	New Zealand	4–0	5–0	Friendly	
111	June 11, 2019	Reims, France	Thailand	13–0	13–0	World Cup: Group F	
112	June 16, 2019	Paris	Chile	1–0	3–0	World Cup: Group F	
113	June 16, 2019	Paris	Chile	3–0	3–0	World Cup: Group F	
114	August 3, 2019	Pasadena	Republic of Ireland	3–0	3–0	Friendly	
115	August 29, 2019	Philadelphia	Portugal	3–0	4–0	Friendly	
116	September 3, 2019	St. Paul	Portugal	1–0	3–0	Friendly	
117	September 3, 2019	St. Paul	Portugal	2–0	3–0	Friendly	
118	October 6, 2019	Chicago	South Korea	1–1	1–1	Friendly	
119	November 7, 2019	Columbus	Sweden	1–0	3–2	Friendly	
120	November 7, 2019	Columbus	Sweden	3–0	3–2	Friendly	
121	November 10, 2019	Jacksonville	Costa Rica	1–0	6–0	Friendly	
122	January 28, 2020	Houston	Haiti	4–0	4–0	Olympic Qualifier – Group A	
123	March 5, 2020	Orlando	England	2–0	2–0	SheBelieves Cup	
124	February 24, 2021	Orlando	Argentina	3–0	6–0	SheBelieves Cup	
125	June 13, 2021	Houston	Jamaica	1–0	4–0	Friendly	
126	July 5, 2021	East Hartford	Mexico	2–0	4–0	Friendly	
127	August 5, 2021	Kashima	Australia	3–1	4–3	Olympics: Bronze medal match	
128	August 5, 2021	Kashima	Australia	4–1	4–3	Olympics: Bronze medal match	
129	September 16, 2021	Cleveland	Paraguay	1–0	9–0	Friendly	
130	September 16, 2021	Cleveland	Paraguay	2–0	9–0	Friendly	
131	September 16, 2021	Cleveland	Paraguay	5–0	9–0	Friendly	
132	September 16, 2021	Cleveland	Paraguay	6–0	9–0	Friendly	
133	September 16, 2021	Cleveland	Paraguay	8–0	9–0	Friendly	
134	September 21, 2021	Cincinnati	Paraguay	7–0	8–0	Friendly	

=== Goals by opponent ===
Goals by opponent
Opponent	Goals
Mexico	12
China	9
Costa Rica	8
Haiti	8
Japan	6
New Zealand	6
Paraguay	6
Norway	5
Sweden	5
Australia	4
Argentina	4
Brazil	4
Chile	4
Colombia	4
Republic of Ireland	4
Thailand	4
Guatemala	3
Panama	3
Portugal	3
Russia	3
Switzerland	3
Canada	2
Belgium	2
Denmark	2
Finland	2
France	2
Germany	2
Jamaica	2
Trinidad and Tobago	2
South Korea	2
Dominican Republic	1
England	1
Iceland	1
Netherlands	1
Puerto Rico	1
Chinese Taipei	1
South Africa	1
Total	134

== Honors ==
Rutgers University

- 2x NSCAA All-American
- 4x NSCAA All-Region Student-Athlete
- 4x First-Team All-Big East
- Soccer America All-Freshman Team
- Big East Rookie of the Year
- Big East Midfielder of the Year: 2004
- No.1 all-time in points (117) and goals (50)
- Rutgers Athletics Hall of Fame: 2018

Western New York Flash

- NWSL Shield: 2013

Manchester City

- FA Women's Cup: 2016–17

United States

- Algarve Cup: 2007, 2008, 2010, 2011, 2013, 2015
- CONCACAF Women's Championship: 2014, 2018
- CONCACAF Women's Olympic Qualifying Tournament: 2008, 2012, 2016, 2020
- Olympic Gold Medal: 2008, 2012
- Olympic Bronze Medal: 2021
- FIFA Women's World Cup: 2015, 2019
- SheBelieves Cup: 2016, 2018, 2020, 2021
- Tournament of Nations: 2018

Individual

- Algarve Cup Most Valuable Player: 2007
- U.S. Soccer Athlete of the Year: 2008
- FIFA World Player of the Year Shortlist: 2012, 2015, 2016
- FIFA Puskás Award Nominee: 2015
- NWSL Player of the Week: July 2013, July 2014
- NWSL Player of the Month: July 2015
- NWSL Second XI: 2014, 2015, 2018
- CONCACAF Women's Player of the Year: 2015
- CONCACAF Goal of the Year: 2015
- FIFA Women's World Cup Golden Ball: 2015
- FIFA Women's World Cup Silver Boot: 2015
- FIFA Women's World Cup All-Star Team: 2015
- FIFA Women's World Cup Dream Team: 2015
- FIFA Women's World Cup Goal of the Tournament: 2015
- Women's Sports Foundation Sportswoman of the Year Team Sport Award: 2015
- IFFHS World's Best Woman Playmaker: 2015
- FIFA World Player of the Year: 2015
- FIFA FIFPro World XI: 2015, 2016, 2021
- The Best FIFA Women's Player: 2016
- New Jersey Hall of Fame: 2017
- IFFHS CONCACAF Best Woman Player of the Decade 2011–2020
- IFFHS World Women's Team of the Decade 2011–2020
- IFFHS CONCACAF Women's Team of the Decade 2011–2020
- National Soccer Hall of Fame: 2025

== See also ==
- List of multiple Olympic gold medalists in one event
- List of Olympic medalists in football
- List of women's footballers with 100 or more caps
- List of FIFA Women's World Cup hat-tricks
- List of Rutgers University alumni
