= Western New York Flash =

Professional soccer club in the United States

- Full name: Western New York Flash Football Club
- Nickname: Flash
- Founded: 2008; 18 years ago
- Dissolved: 2018; 8 years ago
- Stadium: All-High Stadium; Buffalo, New York
- Capacity: 5,000
- Owner: Joe Sahlen
- President: Alexandra Sahlen
- League: United Women's Soccer
- Website: www.wnyflash.com
Home colors	Away colors

The Western New York Flash (WNY Flash) was an American women's soccer club based in Elma, New York, that most recently competed in the United Women's Soccer league in 2018. They won league championships in four different leagues: the USL W-League in 2010, Women's Professional Soccer in 2011, Women's Premier Soccer League Elite in 2012, and the National Women's Soccer League in 2016.

The team was founded in 2008 as the Buffalo Flash and played in the USL W-League from 2008 to 2010. In 2011, the team became the Western New York Flash and joined Women's Professional Soccer (WPS), its only season in the league. In 2012, following the folding of the WPS, the team was a member of Women's Premier Soccer League Elite (WPSL-E). The Flash won three consecutive league championships from 2010 to 2012 under head coach Aaran Lines—W-League in 2010, WPS in 2011, and WPSL-E in 2012. The Flash reached the inaugural NWSL Championship during the 2013 season, but fell to the Portland Thorns FC while searching for their fourth straight title. In 2016, the team won the NWSL Championship for the first and only time.

The team was owned by the Sahlen family, who run the Sahlen's meat packing company in Buffalo. Joe Sahlen was the team's owner. His daughter, Alex Sahlen, was the team President and a former defender on the team. While the professional team was replaced in the NWSL by the North Carolina Courage and folded following two seasons in the United Women's Soccer League, the franchise remains through a youth academy player development program.

== History ==
=== 2009 ===
In 2009, the Buffalo Flash made its debut in the Great Lakes (formerly Northern) Division of the USL W-League's Central Conference, lining up against teams from Hamilton, Laval, London, Ottawa, Quebec City, Rochester and Toronto. It finished second, with a regular season record of 9–2–3 from their 14 matches, undefeated in their seven games on the road, and with 40 goals scored, and 10 conceded. In the post-season playoffs, the Flash reached the Central Conference semi-final, to end their inaugural season with a 10–3–3 record. They were beaten 3–0 by FC Indiana, the only other full-time professional outfit in the league.

The 2009 team roster included players from six countries across four continents. There were four local players from Western NY, various U.S. players from numerous states (including two with U.S. U-20 National Team experience), players from the full Italian national team, Portuguese national team, South African national team, and also from Spain and Japan. To aid team bonding, the squad were housed in the same apartment complex.

=== 2010 ===
Before the 2010 season Buffalo Flash signed English trio Gemma Davison, Eartha Pond and Ann-Marie Heatherson. Mele French and Kelly Parker arrived from German club SC Freiburg. Kimberly Brandão returned despite attending a training camp with Sky Blue FC, but Erika Sutton left for the Boston Breakers and Sarah Wagenfuhr joined St. Louis Athletica.

In 2010 Buffalo Flash competed in the Midwest Division of the USL W-League, finishing the regular season 14–0–2 against Chicago Red Eleven, Cleveland Internationals, Kalamazoo Outrage and London Gryphons. Buffalo Flash won the W-League Championship by defeating the Vancouver Whitecaps 3–1 at Harry Welch Stadium in Santa Clarita, California. They finished the season undefeated, while Kelly Parker was named W-League MVP.

=== 2011 ===
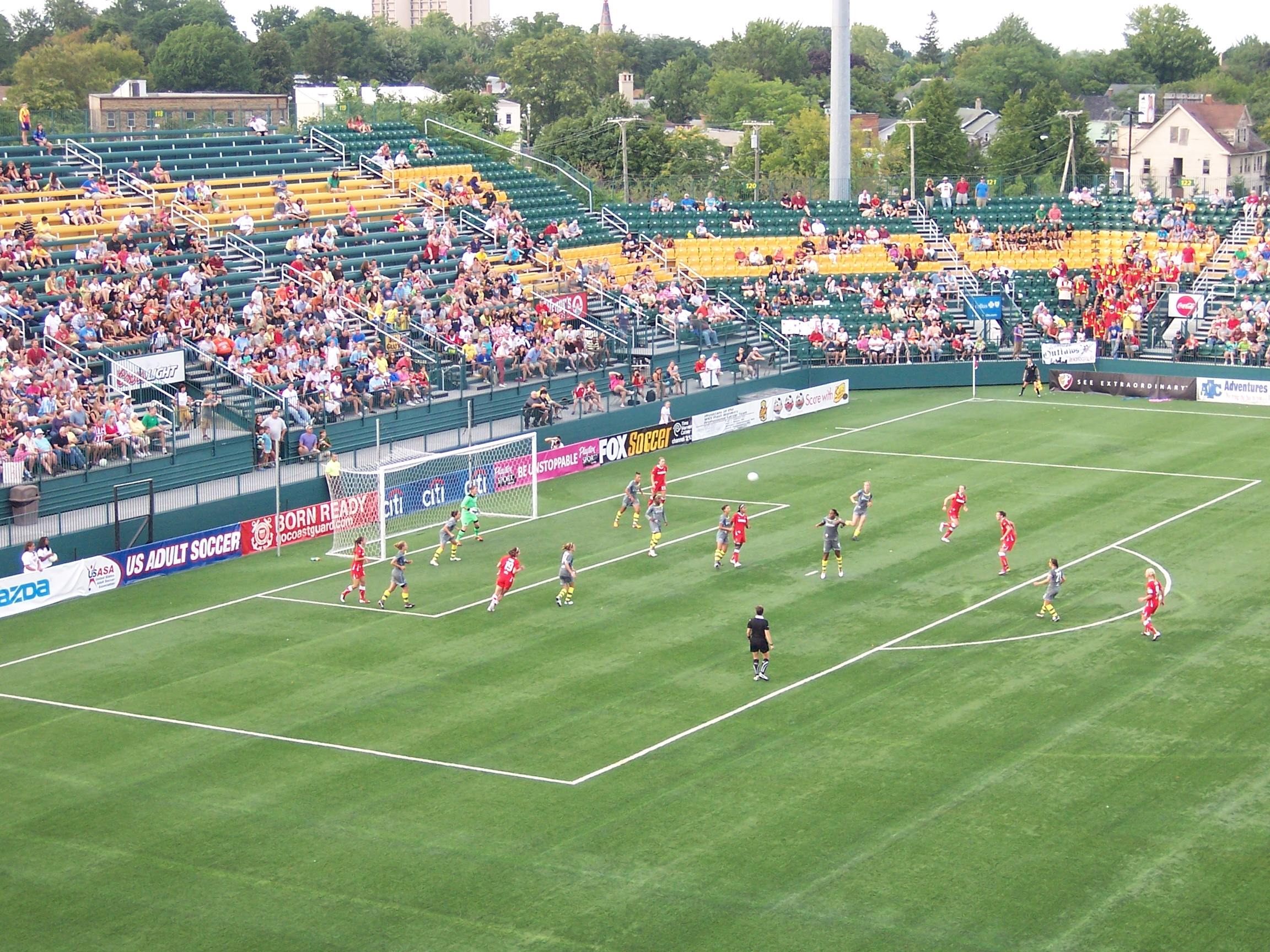
The Flash face off at home against Philadelphia for the 2011 WPS Championship

The team made plans to move to Women's Professional Soccer for the 2011 season. In September 2010, team president Alex Sahlen and coach Aaran Lines—both of whom have played for Rochester-based soccer teams—indicated that the team was looking at playing up to half of its WPS home games at Rochester's Marina Auto Stadium (now Rhinos Stadium). On September 24, WPS officially confirmed that the new team would indeed join the league. The name of the WPS team was announced as the Western New York Flash on December 1, 2010. The September announcement confirmed that the team would play half its home games at Marina Auto Stadium. The remaining games were originally intended to be played at Niagara Field, a smaller facility on the campus of Niagara University in Lewiston that was set to be expanded to 4,000 for the 2011 WPS season. The league also attempted to negotiate a deal with All-High Stadium in Buffalo, although the owners of the field, Buffalo Public Schools, never responded – likely due to existing conflict with four city high schools (which take precedence) and an agreement with Medaille College. However, the December announcement indicated that the entire 2011 home schedule would be in Rochester.

The Flash selected Alex Morgan with the first pick in the 2011 WPS Draft.

On January 25, 2011, the Flash signed 2009 and 2010 WPS MVP and WPS Golden Boot Marta.

With a 13–2–3 regular season record, the Flash earned the regular season title and the right to host the WPS Championship presented by Citi. On August 27, 2011, Western New York Flash capped their inaugural season in WPS by capturing the 2011 WPS Championship title 1–1 (5–4) in a penalty kick shootout in front of the largest championship crowd in league history.

=== 2012 ===
When it was announced that WPS had suspended its 2012 season, the Flash announced their plans to continue playing and shortly thereafter joined the new Women's Premier Soccer League Elite. During the 2012 playoffs, the Flash won the championship in penalty kicks.

=== 2013 ===
The Flash joined the newly formed National Women's Soccer League for its inaugural 2013 season. The team won the first-ever NWSL Shield after finishing in first during the regular season though they ended the season tied for first place with both FC Kansas City and Portland Thorns FC, but won the tiebreak over both teams to claim the shield. With the number one seed, the Flash earned home field advantage through the playoffs, and drew No. 4 Sky Blue FC for its semifinal match.

The team shutout Sky Blue 2–0 in the opening game, earning the right to host the Thorns in the 2013 NWSL Championship at Sahlen's Stadium in Rochester. The Flash ultimately finished second, losing to Portland in the championship game to the score of 2–0, denying the Flash a bid for a record-breaking fourth-straight title in a fourth different league.

=== 2014 ===
The Flash had one of their first down years during the 2014 season, unable to reach the heights of the previous season. They missed the playoffs for the first time in franchise history, placing seventh out of nine teams in NWSL.

=== 2015 ===
The Flash once again had a disappointing season, once again missing the playoffs with a seventh-place finish out of nine teams. The low finishes for the team in the past two seasons caused for quite a few cases of transition, most notably with long time head coach Aaran Lines who was eventually replaced by Paul Riley.

=== 2016 ===
The Flash had quite a bit of roster turnover as well as a new coach so expectations were low for the season, but the Flash ended up making the playoffs for the first time since the inaugural NWSL season. The semi-finals saw the Flash upset the top seed Portland Thorns FC away from home after scoring two goals during extra-time, thus partially avenging their NWSL Cup loss to the Thorns in 2013. The NWSL Championship saw the Flash face the Washington Spirit in Houston. The Flash eventually came out on top, winning their first ever NWSL Championship. This ended up being the final season for the WNY Flash in NWSL, with the franchise rights being sold to the owners of North Carolina FC, moved to Cary, North Carolina, and rebranded as the North Carolina Courage.

=== 2017-18 ===
On March 7, 2017, the Flash announced that they would join the United Women's Soccer for their upcoming season, with the team playing matches in Buffalo for the first time since 2010. This was the fifth league overall that the Flash played in during their ten seasons of existence. Gary Bruce, an assistant under Paul Riley, was named the new head coach. The team folded after the 2018 season, with a youth academy continuing on.

== Stadiums ==
In 2009 the team played their home games at Orchard Park High School Field, in Orchard Park, New York, 15 miles south-east of downtown Buffalo, New York, and trained daily at the nearby Sahlen's Sports Park in Elma, New York. In 2010 the team played home games at the Demske Sports Complex at Canisius College in Buffalo, New York.

In February 2011, the Sahlen family obtained the naming rights to Marina Auto Stadium in Rochester, which was called Sahlen's Stadium from 2011 through 2015. After that time, the team played their home games in Rochester.

The stadium has a seating capacity of 13,768. The stadium's highest attendance record was set on July 20, 2011, at 15,404 during a match between the Flash and magicJack (led by player-coach and Rochester native, Abby Wambach) after the 2011 FIFA Women's World Cup. The game was also the largest single-game crowd in WPS history.

The UWS Flash (2017–18) played most of their home matches at Niagara University, with one match in 2017 played at All-High Stadium.

== Colors and badge ==
The Flash's home colors were white and away colors red. The Flash logo was designed to reflect that of Sahlen's, the team's parent company.

== Year-by-year ==
Year	League	Record W-L-T	Regular season	Playoffs	Avg. attendance
2009	USL W-League	9–2–3	2nd, Great Lakes Division	Central Conference Semifinal	210
2010	USL W-League	10–0–2	1st, Midwest Division	USL W-League Champions	236
2011	WPS	13–2–3	1st	WPS Champions	4,881
2012	WPSL Elite	9–2–3	2nd	WPSL Elite Champions	—
2013	NWSL	10–4–8	1st	Runner-Up	4,485
2014	NWSL	8–12–4	7th	Did not qualify	3,177
2015	NWSL	6–9–5	7th	Did not qualify	2,860
2016	NWSL	9–6–5	4th	NWSL Champions	3,868
2017	UWS	4–4–2	5th, East Conference	Did not qualify	—
2018	UWS	5–5–0	5th, East Conference	Did not qualify	—

== Players ==
=== Notable former players ===
Former members of the team who have represented their respective senior national teams are:

- (Australia) Teigen Allen
- (Australia) Michelle Heyman
- (Australia) Alanna Kennedy
- (Australia) Samantha Kerr
- (Australia) Lydia Williams
- (Brazil) Marta
- (Cameroon) Ajara Nchout Njoya
- (Canada) Adriana Leon
- (Canada) Christine Sinclair
- (Canada) Candace Chapman
- (Colombia) Lady Andrade
- (England) Gemma Davison
- (Italy) Pamela Conti
- (New Zealand) Abby Erceg
- (New Zealand) Ali Riley
- (Spain) Sonia Bermudez
- (Spain) Verónica Boquete
- (Spain) Vicky Losada
- (Spain) Adriana Martín
- (Mexico) Verónica Pérez
- (Mexico) Pamela Tajonar
- (South Korea) Jeon Ga-eul
- (Sweden) Caroline Seger
- (United States) Abby Dahlkemper
- (United States) Whitney Engen
- (United States) Adrianna Franch
- (United States) Ashlyn Harris
- (United States) Jaelene Hinkle
- (United States) Sydney Leroux
- (United States) Gina Lewandowski
- (United States) Carli Lloyd
- (United States) Jessica McDonald
- (United States) Samantha Mewis
- (United States) Taylor Smith
- (United States) Alex Morgan
- (United States) Abby Wambach
- (United States) Lynn Williams

== Coaching staff ==
From 2009 to 2015, Aaran Lines led the team as head coach winning three consecutive league championships and the inaugural NWSL Shield. After he resigned in 2015, Paul Riley led the team to its first NWSL Championship in 2016, with Scott Vallow as an assistant and interim head coach during Riley's suspensions. Charlie Naimo served as Technical Director from 2014 to 2016.

Name	Nationality	From	To
Aaran Lines	New Zealand	February 4, 2009	December 22, 2015
Paul Riley	England	February 19, 2016	January 9, 2017
Gary Bruce	United States	March 30, 2017	July 9, 2017
Matt Waddington	United States	February 16, 2018	July 14, 2018

== Honors ==
=== League ===
- NWSL Championship
  - Winners (1): 2016
  - Runners-up (1): 2013
- NWSL Shield
  - Winners (1): 2013
- WPSL Elite Championship
  - Winners (1): 2012
- WPS Championship
  - Winners (1): 2011
- USL W-League Championship
  - Winners (1): 2010

== See also ==
- List of top-division football clubs in CONCACAF countries
- List of professional sports teams in the United States and Canada
