= Erika Sutton =

American soccer player

Personal information
- Full name: Erika Christine Sutton
- Date of birth: February 4, 1987 (age 39)
- Place of birth: Arvada, Colorado, United States
- Height: 5 ft 5 in (1.65 m)
- Position: Defender

Team information
- Current team: Boston Breakers
- Number: 21

College career
| Years | Team | Apps | (Gls) |
| 2005–2006 | San Diego State Aztecs | 40 | (8) |
| 2007–2008 | Florida State Seminoles | 46 | (5) |

Senior career*
| Years | Team | Apps | (Gls) |
| 2008 | SoccerPlus Connecticut | | |
| 2009 | Buffalo Flash | 12 | (4) |
| 2009 | → Boston Breakers (loan) | 1 | (0) |
| 2010– | Boston Breakers | | |

International career^{‡}
| 2004 | United States U17 | | |
- * Club domestic league appearances and goals as of 21:50, October 30, 2009 (UTC) ‡ National team caps and goals as of 21:50, October 30, 2009 (UTC)

Erika Christine Sutton (born February 4, 1987) is an American soccer defender currently playing for Boston Breakers of Women's Professional Soccer.

== Club career ==
She spent 2009 with Buffalo Flash of W-League. She was sent on a week-long loan to Boston Breakers in July 2009. With Buffalo, she appeared in 12 regular season games (988 minutes), scoring 4 goals and assisting on 1 other. With Boston, she appeared in 1 game (90 minutes). She earned a contract with Boston Breakers for the 2010 season.
