= Kimberly Brandão =

Portuguese footballer (born 1984)

Personal information
- Full name: Kimberly Maria Brandão
- Date of birth: 26 April 1984 (age 42)
- Place of birth: Rahway, New Jersey, United States
- Height: 1.70 m (5 ft 7 in)
- Position: Centre back

Youth career
- 1994–2002: Olympic Development Program (ODP) State Team
- 1998–2001: US Regional Team East Coast Region 1
- 2000–2002: Player Development Academy (PDA) Jersey Splash

College career
Years	Team	Apps	(Gls)
2002–2006	Rutgers Scarlet Knights		

Senior career*
Years	Team	Apps	(Gls)
2004	New Jersey Wildcats		
2007	Falköpings KIK		
2008	CF Puebla		
2007–2008	Jersey Sky Blue		
2009–2010	Buffalo Flash		
2011	Western New York Flash		

International career
2007–2012	Portugal	40	(2)

Managerial career
- 2015–2017: Green Bay Phoenix
- * Club domestic league appearances and goals

Kimberly Maria Brandão (born 26 April 1984) is an American-born Portuguese retired professional footballer who played as a centre back. Through 2012, she was a captain of the Portugal women's national team, which she has represented since 2007.

At the club level, Brandão played professionally for the 2011 WPS Champions Western New York Flash (WNY Flash), and has been a professional player since 2007. She won national championships in 2010 (W-League) and 2011 (WPS).

She is formerly the head coach of the women's soccer team at the University of Wisconsin–Green Bay.

== Early life ==
Brandão was born in Rahway, New Jersey and is a dual citizen of the United States and Portugal. She attended Rahway High School from 1998 to 2002 where she played on the varsity soccer team. As a freshman, tallied 59 points (22g, 15a) and earned first of three consecutive All-Union County honors. During her sophomore year, she tallied 34 points with 10 goals and 14 assists. She was subsequently named to the NJGSCA All-State Team and the Star-Ledger's All-Group 3 First Team and All-State Third Team. As a junior, Brandão was named one of the top 20 players in North Jersey by the New Jersey Girls Soccer Coaches Association (NJGSCA) and named to the Star-Ledger All-Group 3 First Team and All-State Second Team.

Brandão played for the Jersey Splash, coached by Charlie Naimo and won the State Cup in 2001 and 2002, Disney Cup in 2001 and WAGS Memorial Day Tournament in 2000. Brandão played for the Olympic Development Program (ODP) state team for nine years and the regional team for four years from 1998 to 2001.

== Playing career ==
=== Rutgers University Scarlet Knights, 2002–2006 ===
Brandão attended Rutgers University from 2002 to 2006 where she played for the Scarlet Knights. She started and played every minute of 83 of the team's 84 games, missing one through suspension. She was a two-year Team Captain, two-year Team MVP, and four-time All-BIG EAST Selection. Brandão was a four-time All-Big East selection, three-time All-Big East second team selection, and earned Big East Academic All-Star honors.

As a freshman, Brandão started all 20 matches and was named to the Big East All-Rookie Team, Soccerbuzz Mid-Atlantic Region All-Freshman Team, Wachovia Challenge All-Tournament Team & Rutgers Double Tree Classic All-Tournament Team. She led the defense to a 1.32 goals against average (GAA). During her sophomore season, she started all 22 matches and led a defense that allowed 0.91 goals per match. She was named to the All-Big East Second Team, Soccerbuzz Mid-Atlantic Region All-Second Team, NSCAA Mid-Atlantic Region All-Third Team and Soccerbuzz Elite National Team of the week for the week of October 20, 2003. Brandão was twice-named the Big East Defensive Player of the Week and became the second player in Rutgers history to earn Big East Defensive Player-of-the-week honors. During a match against Virginia Tech, she headed in the game-winning goal.

During her junior year, Brandão started all 20 matches and led a defense that allowed just 0.82 goals and 6.9 shots per game. The defense allowed 12 goals in 22 games and held opponents to 0.55 goal per game. She was twice-named Big East Conference Defensive Player of the Week and was named to the Soccer America National Team of the Week for the week of September 14, 2004. Brandão was named Rutgers Defensive Player of the Year and earned All-Big East Second Team, Big East Academic All-Star and Soccerbuzz Mid-Atlantic Region All-Third Team honors. As a senior, Brandão was again named Rutgers Most Valuable Player and captained the team to its best-ever and multiple-record breaking season. She was named Rutgers Defensive Player of the Year and earned TopDrawerSoccer.com National All-First Team, All-BIG EAST Second Team, Soccerbuzz Third Team All-America and NSCAA Mid-Atlantic Region All-First Team honors. Brandão captained Rutgers’ first-ever appearance at a Big East Conference Final (versus the National No. 1 team, Notre Dame). The team set new school records for most wins at home with nine and eight Big East Conference wins in one season. The team ended the season with its highest-ever national ranking at 11.

=== Club ===
==== Western New York Flash, 2011 ====
In March 2011, she became the first Luso-American woman to sign for a WPS team. On Friday, May 13, 2011, she made her Flash debut at Sahlen's Stadium in the 3–2 victory over Boston Breakers, playing left-back, and getting an assist on the Flash's second goal. The win extended WNY Flash's lead at the top of the WPS standings to five points, and the team spent most of the season atop the standings. On August 14, 2011, WNY Flash were crowned WPS 2011 regular season champions, as the highest scoring team in WPS history. On August 27, 2011, WNY Flash then went on to win the WPS Championship match.

Prior to playing for the Flash, Brandão played top level professional club soccer in the Swedish Damallsvenskan and in the Spanish Superliga Femenina, trained with Arsenal Ladies in England, and in the W-League she played for the New Jersey Wildcats (2004, reaching the W-League Championship Final), and Jersey Sky Blue (in 2007 & 2008).

Brandão captained the Buffalo Flash during the 2009 and 2010 seasons. As a professional franchise in an amateur/semi-professional league, Buffalo Flash, won the United Soccer Leagues' W-League in 2010. Brandão captained the Flash to its first ever W-League Championship. In the national champion's undefeated season, Brandão was named to the All-Conference Team, and topped the W-League in minutes played (1243).

==== Jersey Sky Blue, 2007 ====
Brandão played for Jersey Sky Blue in the W-League in 2007 and anchored a defense that led the W-League record, conceding six goals in 14 matches. Starting in all matches and leading the team in minutes played (1174), she helped lead the team to 12–2 mark and a spot in the W-League playoffs.

==== New Jersey Wildcats, 2004 ====
Brandão was the starting center back in all four playoff matches, including the championship final. The team ended the regular season with a 14–0–0 record.

=== International ===
In October 2007, she became the first Luso-American woman to play for the full Portugal women's national team when she made her debut in a 5–1 defeat by Denmark. She captained the team from 2009 to 2012 beginning at the 2009 Algarve Cup, which was Portugal's best ever performance (three wins, one tie). At the 2010 Algarve Cup Brandão led Portugal to its biggest ever win (5–0) in the history of the tournament. At the 2011 Algarve Cup Brandão led Portugal to a 3–1 win over Wales and a 0–0 tie with Chile.
