= Aaran Lines =

New Zealand footballer (born 1976)

Personal information
- Full name: Aaran Franklyn Lines
- Date of birth: 21 December 1976 (age 49)
- Place of birth: Lower Hutt, New Zealand
- Height: 1.67 m (5 ft 6 in)
- Position: Midfielder

Youth career
- Werder Bremen

Senior career*
Years	Team	Apps	(Gls)
1993–1997	Werder Bremen		
1997–1998	Kickers Emden	14	(4)
1998–1999	VfL Osnabrück	40	(1)
1999–2001	Football Kingz	30	(2)
2002	Dresdner SC	9	(0)
2002–2003	Ruch Chorzów	22	(1)
2003–2004	Arka Gdynia	5	(0)
2005	Borussia 1912 Freialdenhoven		
2005	Portland Timbers	23	(1)
2006–2007	Rochester Raging Rhinos	43	(2)
2008	Richmond SC		

International career
	New Zealand U17	10	(0)
	New Zealand U20	8	(0)
	New Zealand U23	9	(0)
1996–2004	New Zealand	31	(4)

Managerial career
- 2009–2010: Buffalo Flash (W-League)
- 2011: Western New York Flash (WPS)
- 2012: Western New York Flash (WPSL Elite)
- 2013–2015: Western New York Flash (NWSL)
Medal record
Representing New Zealand
Men's Association football
OFC Nations Cup
Winner	1998 Australia
Winner	2002 Nee Zealand
Third place	2004 Australia
AFC–OFC Challenge Cup
Runner-up	2003 Iran
- * Club domestic league appearances and goals

Aaran Franklyn Lines (born 21 December 1976) is a New Zealand professional football manager and former player, most recently in charge of the Western New York Flash. He represented New Zealand at international level.

== Club career ==
Born in Lower Hutt, New Zealand, Lines moved to Germany at the age of 16 to join SV Werder Bremen's youth team of the German Bundesliga, following his appearance playing in an U-17 tournament in Japan. Lines played 80 games with the Werder Bremen youth team and 60 games with the reserve team.

In 1997, Lines moved to VfL Osnabrück where he appeared in over 80 matches in the first and second Bundesliga. At the start of the new century, the New Zealand native headed back home to play in the newly launched A-League for the Auckland Football Kingz (now the Wellington Phoenix). Following his stint in the A-League, Lines returned to Europe where he played for Dresdner SC of the 2. Bundesliga, and Ruch Chorzów and Arka Gdynia of the Polish first division.

Lines then headed to America to play for the Portland Timbers of the USL, and in 2006 made the move to Rochester, NY to play for the Rochester Rhinos. Lines appeared in over 40 matches for the Rhinos in the last two years of his career, including the 2006 USL Championship match.

== International career ==
Lines played representative age group football for New Zealand, making ten New Zealand U17, eight New Zealand U20 and nine New Zealand U23 appearances before making his full New Zealand debut in a 1–0 win over Tahiti on 25 September 1998.

He was included in the New Zealand side for the 1999 Confederations Cup finals tournament in Mexico where he featured in all three group games, and again for the 2003 Confederations Cup finals tournament in France where he made a single appearance against Japan.

Lines ended his international playing career with 31 official full international caps and four goals to his credit, his final cap an appearance in a 2–0 win over Fiji on 6 June 2004.

== Coaching career ==
After his two seasons with the Rochester Rhinos, Lines retired and accepted a coaching position with the semi-professional expansion W-League franchise Buffalo Flash. Lines led the Buffalo Flash to an impressive 10–3–3 record in their inaugural season and a trip to the second round of the playoffs. In only his second year of coaching, he led the squad to an undefeated season and a W-League Championship defeating the Vancouver Whitecaps 3–1 in Santa Clarita, CA. Lines was named the Fieldturf 2010 Coach of the Year.

The WNY Flash joined Women's Professional Soccer as an expansion club in September 2010. Lines led a squad featuring five-time FIFA World Player of the Year Marta, Christine Sinclair and Alex Morgan to the 2011 WPS title. In 2013 the WNY Flash was announced as one of eight franchises selected by US Soccer to compete in the NWSL. Lines led the Flash, with a roster including Abby Wambach and Carli Lloyd to the regular-season title with a record of 9–4–8. In the semi-final playoff game, the Flash beat Sky Blue 2–0 at Sahlen's Stadium in Rochester, NY. The Flash lost the championship 2–0 to the Portland Thorns FC in front of over 8,000 fans. Lines focuses on the development of the WNY Flash Youth Academy. He continues to manage Sahlen's Sports Park indoor facility and oversee the direction of the Euros and Champions Soccer series based in Elma, NY.

== Career statistics ==
As of 7 October 2015

Scores and results list New Zealand's goal tally first, score column indicates score after each Lines goal.

List of international goals scored by Aaran Lines
No.	Date	Venue	Opponent	Score	Result	Competition
1	6 June 2001	North Harbour Stadium, Auckland, New Zealand	Tahiti	2–0	5–0	2002 FIFA World Cup qualification
2	13 June 2001	North Harbour Stadium, Auckland, New Zealand	Vanuatu	4–0	7–0	2002 FIFA World Cup qualification
3	12 October 2002	A. Le Coq Arena, Tallinn, Estonia	Estonia	2–1	2–3	Friendly
4	31 May 2004	North Harbour Stadium, Auckland, New Zealand	Solomon Islands	3–0	3–0	2004 OFC Nations Cup

== Managerial statistics ==
All competitive league games (league and domestic cup) and international matches (including friendlies) are included.

As of 11 April 2015

Team	Nat	Year	Record				
Team	Nat	Year	G	W	D	L	Win %
Buffalo Flash (W-League)	(United States)	2009–2010	30	22	2	6	73.33
Western New York Flash (WPS)	(United States)	2011	19	14	3	2	73.68
Western New York Flash (WPSL Elite)	(United States)	2012	16	11	3	2	68.75
Western New York Flash (NWSL)	(United States)	2013–2015	64	20	13	31	31.25
Career Total			129	67	21	41	51.94

== Personal life ==
Lines is married to Alex Sahlen, who played for the Flash from 2009 to 2014, was the team's president, and is the daughter of team owner Joe Sahlen. They have three children.

== Honours ==
New Zealand

- OFC Nations Cup: 1998, 2002; 3rd place, 2004
- AFC–OFC Challenge Cup: Runner-up, 2003
