= Alexandra Sahlen =

American soccer player and entrepreneur

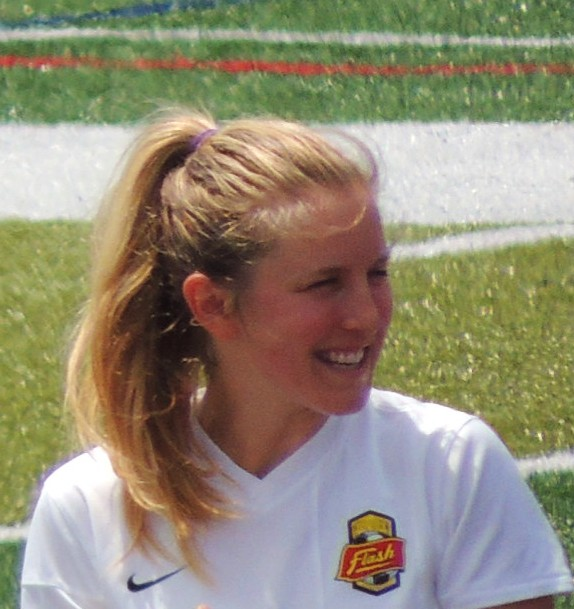
- Sahlen in starting lineup of Western New York Flash vs Chicago Red Stars match on July 4, 2013

Personal information
- Full name: Alexandra Elizabeth Sahlen
- Date of birth: September 25, 1982 (age 44)
- Place of birth: Williamsville, New York, U.S.
- Height: 1.64 m (5 ft 5 in)
- Position: Defender

College career
Years	Team	Apps	(Gls)
2000–2003	Niagara Purple Eagles		

Senior career*
Years	Team	Apps	(Gls)
2005–2008	Rochester Ravens	33	(0)
2009–2010	Buffalo Flash	22	(0)
2011–2013	Western New York Flash	18	(0)
- * Club domestic league appearances and goals ‡ National team caps and goals as of April 14, 2013

Alexandra Elizabeth Sahlen (born September 25, 1982) is an American former professional soccer player and entrepreneur. She played for the Western New York Flash of the National Women's Soccer League (NWSL) and was also the club's president.

== Early life ==
Sahlen was born and raised in Williamsville, New York, a small suburb of Buffalo.

=== Niagara University ===
Sahlen attended Niagara University from 2000 to 2003 where she played for the Purple Eagles. She started 55 matches and completed her collegiate career with six goals and 10 assists, ranking 20th on the school's all-time scoring list. Sahlen helped guide the Purple Eagles to their first MAAC Championship appearance in 2003.

== Playing career ==
=== Club ===
==== Rochester Ravens ====
Sahlen played with W-League club Rochester Ravens from 2005 until 2008, when a stress fracture in the first game of the season ruled her out of contention.

==== Western New York Flash ====
Along with husband Aaran Lines, Sahlen then founded a new professional W-League club, Buffalo Flash, in time for the 2009 season. Sahlen played for the Flash as they won the 2010 W-League championship and remained on the playing roster when the team changed its name to Western New York Flash and entered Women's Professional Soccer, claiming the 2011 WPS Championship.

Sahlen missed the 2014 NWSL season due to being pregnant and was not on the Flash roster for the 2015 season.

== Coaching career ==
Sahlen was assistant coach for the women's soccer team at her alma mater, Niagara University from 2004 to 2011.
