= List of Portland Thorns FC players =

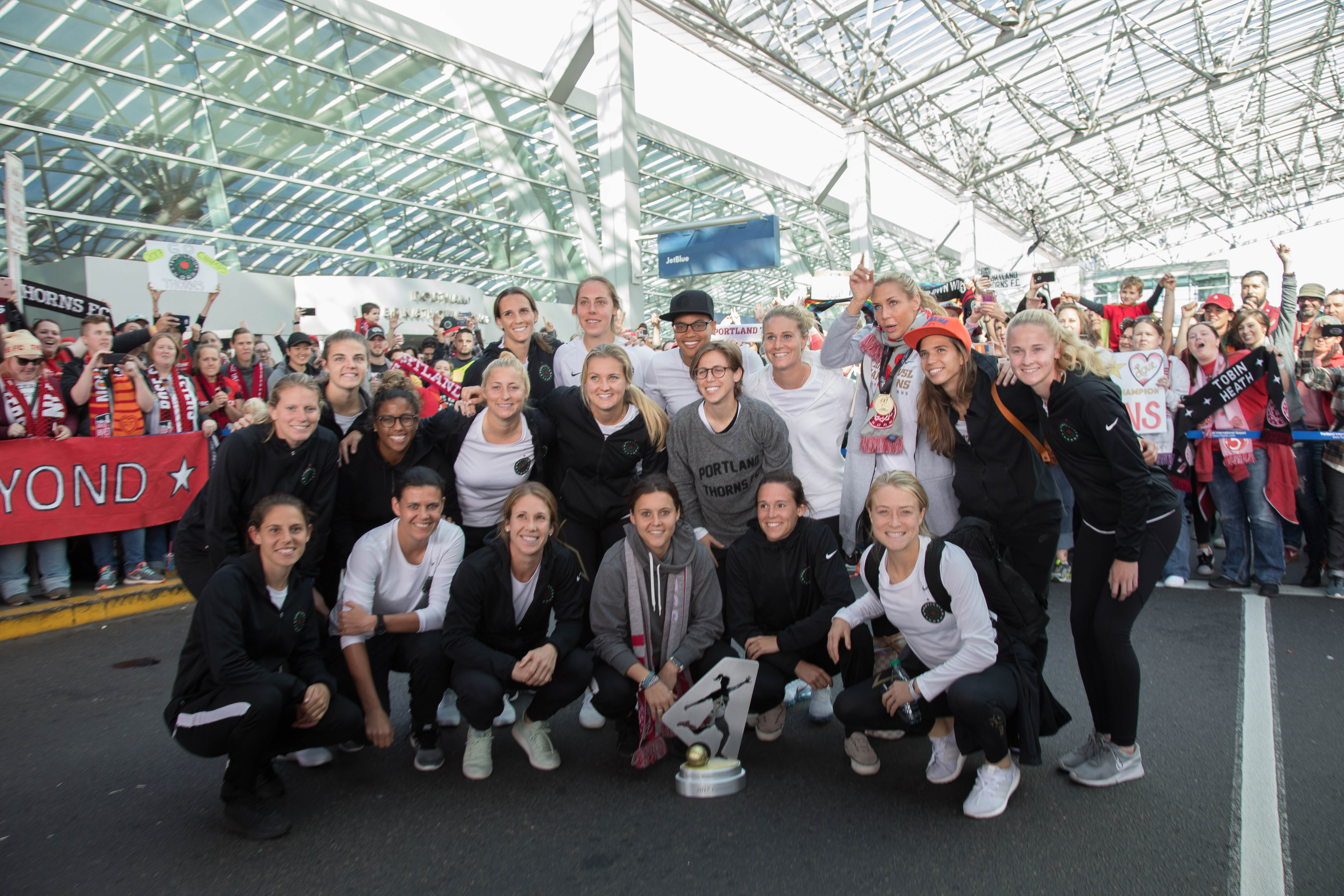
Portland Thorns FC in 2017

Portland Thorns FC is an American professional women's soccer club which began play in the National Women's Soccer League's (NWSL) inaugural season in 2013. All Thorns players who have appeared for the team in an official competition or have been contracted to play for the team are listed below.

== Key ==
- Appearances as a substitute are included.
- Statistics are correct as of February 27, 2026, after the end of the 2025 NWSL season, and should be updated once a year after the conclusion of the NWSL season.
- Statistics include only those games played as a Thorn; if a player transferred to or from another club mid-season, their appearances for the other club are not included.
- The list is ordered first by total number of appearances, then by number of regular-season appearances, and then if necessary in alphabetical order.

Positions key
GK	Goalkeeper
DF	Defender
MF	Midfielder
FW	Forward

Nationality
Unless otherwise noted, the nationality of a player is determined by the country they most recently represented in international play, or if said player has not played international football then by their country of birth.
Position
Playing positions are listed according to the player's roster designation as of the list's most recent update.
Thorns career
Thorns career is defined as the first and last calendar years in which the player was rostered for the club in any of the competitions listed below.
Appearances
This list counts appearances only in official NWSL competitions, including the NWSL regular season, playoffs, Challenge Cup, and Fall Series.

== Players ==
- Players whose names are highlighted in **bold** were active players on the Thorns roster as of March 2026.
- If a player, while on the Thorns, was known by a different name than the one they currently use, that name is shown in parentheses.
- Number of appearances is as of February 2026 (before start of 2026 season).

Player				Appearances				
Name	Nat.	Pos.	Thorns career	NWSL	Playoffs	Cup	Other	Total
Christine Sinclair	(Canada) CAN	FW	2013–2024	185	13	20	4	222
Emily Menges	(United States) USA	DF	2014–2023	159	8	12	4	183
Meghan Klingenberg	(United States) USA	DF	2016–2024	117	9	21	3	150
Kelli Hubly	(United States) USA	DF	2017–2024	98	4	21	4	127
**Olivia Moultrie**	(United States) USA	MF	2021–	96	5	11	0	112
Sam Coffey	(United States) USA	MF	2022–2025	94	6	8	0	108
Allie Long	(United States) USA	MF	2013–2017	100	5	0	0	105
Rocky Rodríguez	(Costa Rica) CRC	MF	2020–2023	75	4	16	4	99
**Morgan Weaver**	(United States) USA	FW	2021–	77	5	16	0	98
**Sophia (Smith) Wilson**	(United States) USA	FW	2020–	77	5	10	4	96
Lindsey (Horan) Heaps	(United States) USA	MF	2016–2023	75	5	7	4	91
**Bella (Geist) Bixby**	(United States) USA	GK	2018–	75	3	10	0	88
Becky Sauerbrunn	(United States) USA	DF	2020–2024	69	3	9	4	85
**Reyna Reyes**	(Mexico) MEX	DF	2023–	74	4	5	0	83
Mana Shim	(United States) USA	MF	2013–2017	76	3	0	0	79
Natalia Kuikka	(Finland) FIN	DF	2021–2023	59	4	15	0	78
Celeste Boureille	(United States) USA	MF	2016–2021	56	2	8	0	66
Tobin Heath	(United States) USA	MF	2013–2019	57	8	0	0	65
Emily Sonnett	(United States) USA	DF	2016–2019	59	5	0	0	64
**Sam Hiatt**	(United States) USA	DF	2023–	56	2	6	0	64
Mallory Weber	(United States) USA	DF	2016–2019	63	0	0	0	63
Adrianna Franch	(United States) USA	GK	2016–2021	51	4	5	0	60
Hayley Raso	(Australia) AUS	FW	2016–2019	54	3	0	0	57
**Alexa Spaanstra**	(United States) USA	FW	2023–	53	3	1	0	57
**Jessie Fleming**	(Canada) CAN	MF	2024–	53	3	0	0	56
Tyler Lussi	(United States) USA	FW	2017–2021	42	0	10	4	56
**Reilyn Turner**	(United States) USA	FW	2024–	50	3	0	0	53
Katherine Reynolds	(United States) USA	DF	2016–2020	47	3	3	0	53
Hina Sugita	(Japan) JPN	MF	2022–2024	40	4	8	0	52
Nikki Marshall	(United States) USA	DF	2013–2014	46	2	0	0	48
Kat Williamson	(United States) USA	DF	2013, 2015–2016	46	2	0	0	48
Rachel (Buehler) Van Hollebeke	(United States) USA	DF	2013–2015	45	3	0	0	48
Angela Salem	(United States) USA	MF	2018–2021	31	1	11	4	47
**Deyna Castellanos**	(Venezuela) VEN	FW	2024–	44	2	0	0	46
Crystal Dunn	(United States) USA	MF	2021–2023	39	4	2	0	45
Simone Charley	(United States) USA	FW	2019–2021	30	1	10	4	45
Midge Purce	(United States) USA	FW	2018–2019	41	3	0	0	44
Madison Pogarch	(United States) USA	DF	2019–2022	25	0	16	3	44
Nadia Nadim	(Denmark) DEN	FW	2016–2017	36	3	0	0	39
Alex Morgan	(United States) USA	FW	2013–2015	36	2	0	0	38
**Isabella Obaze**	(Denmark) DEN	DF	2024–	36	2	0	0	38
Sinead Farrelly	(Republic of Ireland) IRL	MF	2014–2015	36	0	0	0	36
Ellie Carpenter	(Australia) AUS	DF	2018–2019	34	2	0	0	36
Kaitlyn Torpey	(Australia) AUS	DF	2024–2025	34	2	0	0	36
Janine (Beckie) Sonis	(Canada) CAN	FW	2022–2023	33	2	1	0	36
Yazmeen Ryan	(United States) USA	FW	2021–2022	28	3	5	0	36
Dagný Brynjarsdóttir	(Iceland) ISL	MF	2017, 2019	32	3	0	0	35
Izzy D'Aquila	(United States) USA	FW	2023–2024	29	0	6	0	35
Ana-Maria Crnogorčević	(Switzerland) SUI	FW	2018–2019	32	2	0	0	34
Amandine Henry	(France) FRA	MF	2016–2017	30	3	0	0	33
Michelle Betos	(United States) USA	GK	2014–2016	31	1	0	0	32
Payton Linnehan	(United States) USA	FW	2024–2025	31	1	0	0	32
Angie Kerr	(United States) USA	MF	2013–2014	29	2	0	0	31
Meaghan Nally	(United States) USA	DF	2020–2024	25	0	11	0	31
Nadine Angerer	(Germany) GER	GK	2014–2015, 2020–2021	28	1	0	0	29
Shelby Hogan	(United States) USA	GK	2021–2024	23	2	4	0	29
Christen Westphal	(United States) USA	DF	2020–2021	15	0	10	4	29
**Mackenzie Arnold**	(Australia) AUS	GK	2024–	26	2	0	0	28
**Mallie McKenzie**	(United States) USA	DF	2024–	26	2	0	0	28
**Pietra Tordin**	(United States) USA	FW	2025–	26	2	0	0	28
**Marie Müller**	(Germany) GER	DF	2024–	26	1	0	0	27
Andressinha	(Brazil) BRA	MF	2018–2019	25	2	0	0	27
Hannah Betfort	(United States) USA	DF	2021–2023	19	1	7	0	27
Taylor Porter	(United States) USA	MF	2021–2023	19	0	8	0	27
Caitlin Foord	(Australia) AUS	FW	2018–2019	23	3	0	0	26
Britt Eckerstrom	(United States) USA	GK	2018–2020, 2022	20	0	6	0	26
Jessica McDonald	(United States) USA	FW	2014	24	1	0	0	25
**M.A. Vignola**	(United States) USA	DF	2025–	23	0	0	0	23
Sarah Huffman	(United States) USA	MF	2014	22	1	0	0	23
Elizabeth Ball	(United States) USA	DF	2018–2019	21	2	0	0	23
Danielle Foxhoven	(United States) USA	MF	2013	21	2	0	0	23
Karina LeBlanc	(Canada) CAN	GK	2013	21	2	0	0	23
Marissa Everett	(United States) USA	FW	2019–2022	24	0	10	2	22
Kendall Johnson	(United States) USA	DF	2015–2017	21	0	0	0	21
Amber Brooks	(United States) USA	DF	2014	20	1	0	0	21
Marian Dougherty	(United States) USA	DF	2013	19	2	0	0	21
Michele Vasconcelos	(United States) USA	FW	2022–2023	16	1	4	0	21
**Mimi Alidou**	(Canada) CAN	FW	2025–	20	0	0	0	20
**Jayden Perry**	(United States) USA	DF	2025–	19	1	0	0	20
Gabby (Seiler) Kessler	(United States) USA	MF	2019–2020	15	0	4	1	20
Nicole Payne	(Nigeria) NGR	DF	2024–2025	19	0	0	0	19
Becca Moros	(United States) USA	DF	2014	18	1	0	0	19
McCall Zerboni	(United States) USA	MF	2015	18	0	0	0	18
Steph Catley	(Australia) AUS	DF	2014–2015	17	1	0	0	18
Courtney Wetzel	(United States) USA	DF	2013	16	2	0	0	18
Ashleigh Sykes	(Australia) AUS	MF	2017	15	2	0	0	17
Verónica Boquete	(Spain) ESP	MF	2014	15	1	0	0	16
**Julie Dufour**	(France) FRA	FW	2025–	15	0	0	0	15
Courtney (Niemiec) Tole	(United States) USA	DF	2014–2015	15	0	0	0	15
Genoveva Añonman	(Equatorial Guinea) GEQ	FW	2015	12	0	0	0	12
Kaylyn Kyle	(Canada) CAN	MF	2015	12	0	0	0	12
**Caiya Hanks**	(United States) USA	FW	2025–	11	0	0	0	11
Sophie Hirst	(United States) USA	MF	2024–2025	11	0	0	0	11
Daiane	(Brazil) BRA	DF	2025	9	2	0	0	11
Meghan Cox	(United States) USA	DF	2017	10	0	0	0	10
Ana Dias	(Portugal) POR	FW	2024	10	0	0	0	10
Becky Edwards	(United States) USA	DF	2013	10	0	0	0	10
Tiffany Weimer	(United States) USA	FW	2013	9	1	0	0	10
Natalie Beckman	(United States) USA	FW/DF	2022–2023	5	0	5	0	10
Taylor Comeau	(United States) USA	DF	2015	9	0	0	0	9
Clare Polkinghorne	(Australia) AUS	DF	2015	9	0	0	0	9
Gabby Provenzano	(United States) USA	MF	2022–2024	4	0	5	0	9
Alyssa Kleiner	(United States) USA	DF	2015	8	0	0	0	8
Meg Morris	(United States) USA	DF	2016–2018	8	0	0	0	8
Ifeoma Onumonu	(Nigeria) NGR	FW	2018	8	0	0	0	8
Hanna Terry	(United States) USA	FW	2014–2015	8	0	0	0	8
Tegan McGrady	(United States) USA	DF	2022–2023	6	0	2	0	8
Emily (Ogle) Curran	(United States) USA	MF	2019–2020	3	0	2	3	8
Sarah Jackson	(United States) USA	FW	2015	7	0	0	0	7
Jodie Taylor	(England) ENG	FW	2015	7	0	0	0	7
Adriana Leon	(Canada) CAN	FW	2023	5	0	2	0	7
Marissa Sheva	(Ireland) EIR	FW	2024	6	0	0	0	6
Katarina Tarr	(United States) USA	DF	2014	6	0	0	0	6
Laila Harbert	(England) ENG	MF	2025	5	1	0	0	6
McKenzie Berryhill	(United States) USA	DF	2016	5	0	0	0	5
Shade Pratt	(United States) USA	FW	2016	5	0	0	0	5
Lianne Sanderson	(England) ENG	FW	2015	5	0	0	0	5
Olivia (Wade-)Katoa	(United States) USA	MF	2024	5	0	0	0	5
Tina Frimpong Ellertson	(United States) USA	DF	2013	3	2	0	0	5
Jazmyne Avant	(United States) USA	DF	2013	4	0	0	0	4
Elizabeth Guess	(United States) USA	FW	2013	4	0	0	0	4
Kelsey Haycook	(United States) USA	FW	2015	4	0	0	0	4
Emilee O'Neil	(United States) USA	DF	2013	4	0	0	0	4
Casey Ramirez	(United States) USA	DF	2013	4	0	0	0	4
Jessica Shufelt	(United States) USA	FW	2013	4	0	0	0	4
Maureen Fitzgerald	(United States) USA	MF	2016, 2022	3	0	0	0	3
Jennifer Skogerboe	(United States) USA	MF	2016	3	0	0	0	3
Abby Smith	(United States) USA	GK	2021–2022	1	0	2	0	3
Jackie Acevedo	(Mexico) MEX	FW	2014	2	0	0	0	2
Savannah Jordan	(United States) USA	FW	2017	2	0	0	0	2
**Valerin Loboa**	(Colombia) COL	FW	2025–	2	0	0	0	2
Emily Alvarado	(Mexico) MEX	GK	2023–2024	0	0	2	0	2
Autumn Smithers	(United States) USA	DF	2020	0	0	2	0	2
Kate Bennett	(United States) USA	MF	2015	1	0	0	0	1
Ashley Herndon	(United States) USA	MF	2017	1	0	0	0	1
Cris Lewis	(United States) USA	GK	2013	1	0	0	0	1
Sam Lofton	(United States) USA	DF	2016	1	0	0	0	1
Sarah Robbins	(Canada) CAN	MF	2015	1	0	0	0	1
Cheyenne Shorts	(Scotland) SCO	DF	2022	1	0	0	0	1
Raisa Strom-Okimoto	(United States) USA	FW	2021	1	0	0	0	1
Elizabeth Sullivan	(United States) USA	FW	2014	1	0	0	0	1
Rhian Wilkinson	(Canada) CAN	DF	2015	1	0	0	0	1
Kayla Morrison	(Australia) AUS	DF	2023	0	0	1	0	1
Katy Byrne	(United States) USA	MF	2019, 2022	0	0	0	0	0
Carlie Davis	(United States) USA	DF	2013	0	0	0	0	0
Amanda Dutra	(United States) USA	MF	2013	0	0	0	0	0
Adelaide Gay	(United States) USA	GK	2013, 2018	0	0	0	0	0
Emily Kruger	(United States) USA	GK	2016	0	0	0	0	0
Brittany Persaud	(Guyana) GUY	MF	2021	0	0	0	0	0
Anika Rodriguez	(Mexico) MEX	FW	2020	0	0	0	0	0
Jada Talley	(United States) USA	MF	2022	0	0	0	0	0
Sandra Yu	(United States) USA	MF	2018	0	0	0	0	0

== Nationalities ==
Only players who played in at least one game are included here. Current as of February 2026 (before the 2026 season).

Nation		Thorns players
United States	(United States) USA	96
Australia	(Australia) AUS	9
Canada	(Canada) CAN	9
England	(England) ENG	3
Mexico	(Mexico) MEX	3
Brazil	(Brazil) BRA	2
Denmark	(Denmark) DEN	2
France	(France) FRA	2
Germany	(Germany) GER	2
Nigeria	(Nigeria) NGR	2
Colombia	(Colombia) COL	1
Costa Rica	(Costa Rica) CRC	1
Equatorial Guinea	(Equatorial Guinea) GEQ	1
Finland	(Finland) FIN	1
Iceland	(Iceland) ISL	1
Ireland	(Republic of Ireland) IRL	1
Japan	(Japan) JPN	1
Northern Ireland	(Ireland) EIR	1
Portugal	(Portugal) POR	1
Scotland	(Scotland) SCO	1
Spain	(Spain) ESP	1
Switzerland	(Switzerland) SUI	1
Venezuela	(Venezuela) VEN	1

== See also ==
- List of top-division football clubs in CONCACAF countries
- List of professional sports teams in the United States and Canada
