= 2014 NWSL expansion draft =

Soccer draft

General information
- Sport: Soccer
- Date: January 10, 2014
- Time: 11 a.m. EST
- Location: Conference call

Overview
- 10 total selections
- League: National Women's Soccer League
- Expansion team: Houston Dash
- Expansion season: 2014

The 2014 NWSL expansion draft was a special draft held on January 10 by the National Women's Soccer League to allow the expansion side Houston Dash to select players. The Dash were allowed to select ten players from the existing eight NWSL teams.

== Format ==
- 2013 playoff teams may protect up to 9 players, and 2013 non-playoff teams up to 10.
- Clubs with more than two US allocated players must leave at least one unprotected.
- The Dash are allowed to pick up to two players from any existing team, though choosing a US allocated player is considered as using both picks.
- The Dash are allowed to pick no more than two US allocated players, one Canadian allocated player, and one Mexican allocated player.
- When an existing club loses a player, they may protect one of their remaining unprotected players.
- Existing clubs are required to protect players that are...
  - On loan from another league
  - A non-allocated international player
  - Contractually limited against potential movement between teams

== Expansion draft results ==
#	Player	Previous team
1	Brittany Bock	Sky Blue FC
2	Tiffany McCarty	Washington Spirit
3	Lauren Sesselmann	FC Kansas City
4	Mana Shim	Portland Thorns FC
5	Ella Masar	Chicago Red Stars
6	Meghan Klingenberg	Boston Breakers
7	Arianna Romero	Seattle Reign FC
8	Becky Edwards	Portland Thorns FC
9	Danesha Adams	Sky Blue FC
10	Kika Toulouse	Washington Spirit

== Team-by-team breakdown ==
- **Bold** indicates a player was selected in the expansion draft
- Italic indicates a player whose rights are owned but is not under contract
- Blue, green, and red highlights indicate US, Mexican, and Canadian allocated players
- Yellow highlight indicates non-allocated international players or players on loan from another league
- ^Indicates a player that was protected after a teammate had been drafted

=== Boston Breakers ===
Protected	Unprotected
Courtney Jones	Jazmyne Avant
Julie King	Michelle Betos
Kaylyn Kyle	Bianca D'Agostino
Joanna Lohman	Maddy Evans
Kia McNeill	Dinora Garza
Kristie Mewis	**Meghan Klingenberg**
Alyssa Naeher	Jessica Luscinski
Heather O'Reilly	Melissa Ortiz
Lianne Sanderson	Katie Schoepfer
Cat Whitehill	Chelsea Stewart

=== Chicago Red Stars ===
Protected	Unprotected
Zakiya Bywaters	Shannon Boxx
Lori Chalupny	Amy LePeilbet
Taryn Hemmings	**Ella Masar**
Jen Hoy	Alyssa Mautz^
Adriana Leon	Jackie Santacaterina
Leslie Osborne	Julianne Sitch
Christen Press	Melissa Tancredi
Rachel Quon	Lindsay Tarpley
Casey Short	Lydia Vandenbergh
Taylor Vancil	Michelle Wenino

=== FC Kansas City ===
Protected	Unprotected
Jen Buczkowski	Nicole Barnhart
Melissa Henderson	Liz Bogus
Lauren Holiday	Sinead Farrelly
Nikki Krzysik	Jaime French
Merritt Mathias	Bianca Henninger
Leigh Ann Robinson	Katie Kelly
Amy Rodriguez	Casey Loyd
Becky Sauerbrunn	Cecilia Santiago
Erika Tymrak	Desiree Scott
	**Lauren Sesselmann**
	Nia Williams
	Six Discovery Players (Sarah Hagen^)

=== Portland Thorns FC ===
Protected	Unprotected
Jackie Acevedo	Rachel Buehler
Amber Brooks	**Becky Edwards**
Tobin Heath	Tina Ellertson
Allie Long	Angie Kerr
Nikki Marshall	Karina LeBlanc
Alex Morgan	Jessica McDonald
Rebecca Moros	Emilee O'Neil
Christine Sinclair	Casey Ramirez
Kat Williamson	**Mana Shim**
	Nikki Washington
	Tiffany Weimer
	Michele Weissenhofer
	Courtney Wetzel
	Four Discovery Players (unnamed^)

=== Seattle Reign FC ===
Protected	Unprotected
Lauren Barnes	Stephanie Cox
Jessica Fishlock	Kiersten Dallstream
Danielle Foxhoven	Kate Deines^
Beverly Goebel-Yanez	Kaley Fountain
Sydney Leroux	Alina Garciamendez
Kim Little	Carmelina Moscato
Megan Rapinoe	Mariah Nogueira
Elli Reed	**Arianna Romero**
Hope Solo	Six Discovery Players
Keelin Winters	

=== Sky Blue FC ===
Protected	Unprotected
Lisa De Vanna	**Danesha Adams**
Caitlin Foord	**Brittany Bock**
Katy Freels	Brittany Cameron
Courtney Goodson	Allison Falk
Lindsi Lisonbee Cutshall	Jonelle Filigno
Mónica Ocampo	Kendall Johnson^
Christie Rampone	Meghan Lenczyk
Sophie Schmidt	Jillian Loyden
One Discovery Player	Taylor Lytle
	Ashley Nick
	Kelley O'Hara
	Maddie Thompson
	Kandace Wilson
	One Discovery Player

=== Washington Spirit ===
Protected	Unprotected
Yael Averbuch	Marisa Abegg
Renae Cuéllar	Jordan Angeli
Robyn Gayle	Candace Chapman
Tori Huster	Ashlyn Harris
Ali Krieger	Chantel Jones
Diana Matheson	Natasha Kai
Christine Nairn	Lori Lindsey^
Stephanie Ochs	**Tiffany McCarty**
Toni Pressley	Caroline Miller
Jodie Taylor	Julia Roberts
	Jasmyne Spencer
	**Kika Toulouse**
	Colleen Williams
	Two Discovery Players

=== Western New York Flash ===
Protected	Unprotected
Adrianna Franch	Amy Barczuk
Samantha Kerr	Vicki DiMartino
Carli Lloyd	Valerie Henderson
Adriana Martín	Sarah Huffman
Katherine Reynolds	Selenia Iacchelli
Brittany Taylor	Estelle Johnson
Abby Wambach	Verónica Pérez
McCall Zerboni	Angela Salem
One Discovery Player	

== See also ==
- List of NWSL drafts
- 2014 NWSL season
