= 2013 Portland Thorns FC season =

Portland Thorns FC
2013 season
- President: Merritt Paulson
- Head coach: Cindy Parlow Cone
- Stadium: Jeld-Wen Field; Portland, Oregon (Capacity: 20,438)
- National Women's Soccer League: 3rd
- NWSL Playoffs: Champions
- Top goalscorer: Alex Morgan; Christine Sinclair (8 goals)
- Highest home attendance: 16,479
- Lowest home attendance: 10,886
- Average home league attendance: 13,320
Home colors	Away colors

The 2013 season was the Portland Thorns' inaugural season in the newly created National Women's Soccer League (NWSL), the top division of women's professional soccer in the United States. The Thorns ended the 22-game regular season in third place with a 10-6-6 record, qualifying them for the NWSL playoffs. In their semi-final game the team beat FC Kansas City 3-2 in extra time, qualifying them to play Western New York Flash in the championship. The Thorns beat the Flash 2–0, making Portland Thorns FC the NWSL champion.

== Background ==
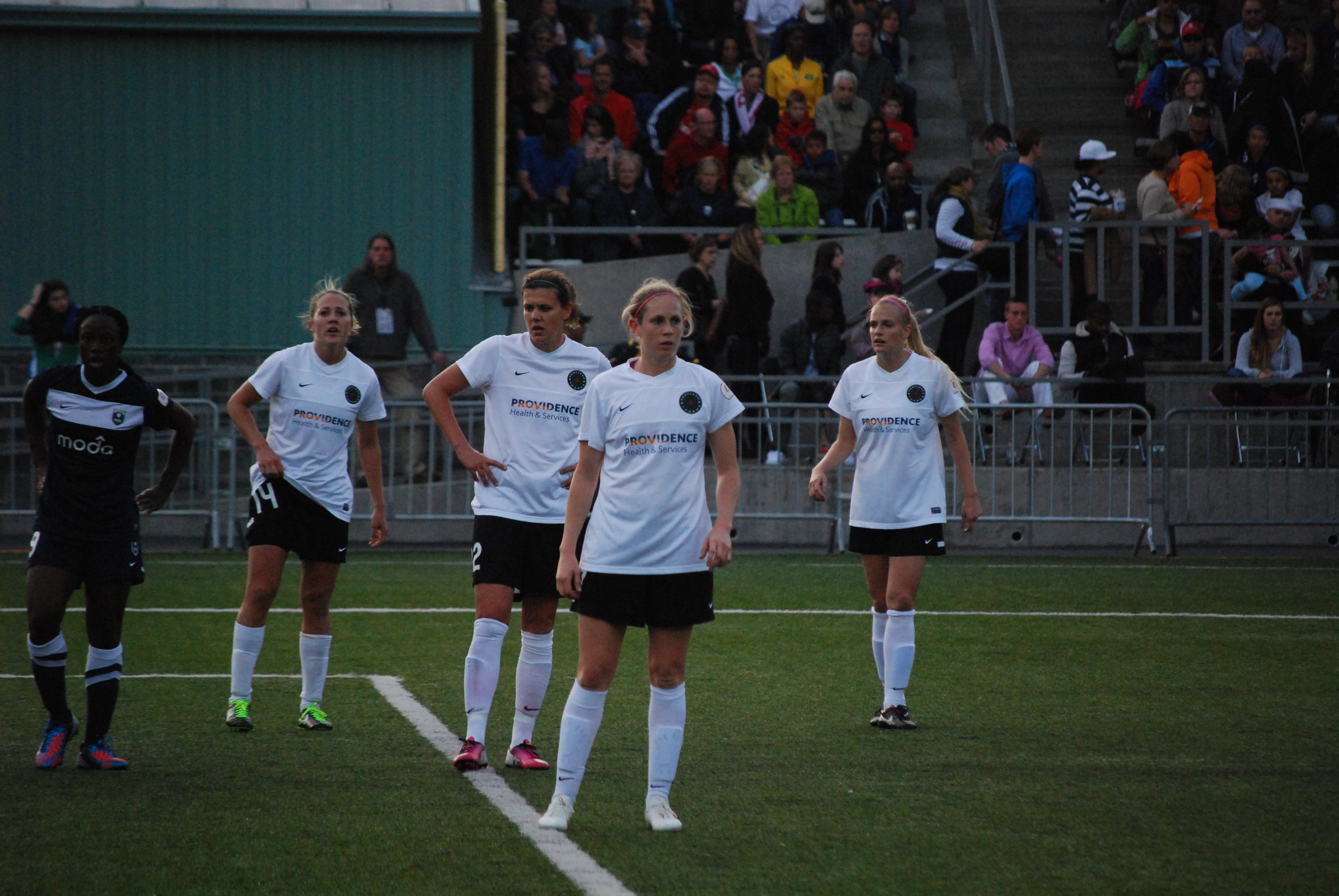
in 2013

The league's founding was announced on November 21, 2012, with Portland as a host for one of eight teams. At that time it was announced by Portland Timbers' owner Merritt Paulson that the Timbers would own the team.

The chosen team, Portland Thorns FC, was announced on December 13, 2012, accompanied by the unveiling of its logo. Both the name and logo were intended to invoke Portland's nickname of the Rose City.

Cindy Parlow Cone was announced as the first head coach on December 19, 2012.

== Club ==
=== Executive staff ===
Majority Owner & President	Merritt Paulson
Chief Operating Officer	Mike Golub
General Manager / Technical Director	Gavin Wilkinson
Ground (capacity and dimensions)	Jeld-Wen Field (20,438 / 110x70 yards)

Updated to match played February 11, 2013
Source: Portland Timbers

=== Coaching staff ===
Position	Staff
Head Coach	Cindy Parlow Cone
Assistant Coach	John Galas

Last updated: February 11, 2013

== Roster ==
In the National Women's Soccer League's (NWSL) inaugural season, the eight founding clubs filled out their rosters through numerous mechanisms. First, teams are allocated national team players from the United States, Canada, and Mexico. Next, teams go through the NWSL College Draft, a free agency period, the NWSL Supplemental Draft, and the signing of Discovery Players.

No.	Name	Nationality	Date of birth (age)	Previous club	Signed Via / Notes
Goalkeepers
1	Karina LeBlanc	(Canada)	30 March 1980 (age 46)	(United States) magicJack (WPS)	National team allocation
23	Adelaide Gay	(United States)	3 November 1989 (age 37)	University of North Carolina	Discovery player
Defenders
2	Marian Dougherty	(United States)	25 November 1984 (age 41)	(United States) magicJack (WPS)	Supplemental draft
4	Emilee O'Neil	(United States)	26 March 1983 (age 43)	Stanford University	Discovery player
15	Casey Ramirez	(United States)	8 December 1989 (age 36)	Fortuna Hjorring	Discovery player
5	Kathryn Williamson	(United States)	1 August 1989 (age 37)	University of Florida	NWSL College Draft
7	Nikki Marshall	(United States)	2 June 1988 (age 38)	(United States) Western New York Flash	Free agent
11	Jazmyne Avant	(United States)	30 January 1990 (age 36)	(United States) New York Fury	Discovery player
16	Rachel Van Hollebeke	(United States)	26 August 1985 (age 41)	(United States) Boston Breakers	National team allocation
Midfielders
3	Elizabeth Guess	(United States)	11 January 1985 (age 41)	(United States) Boston Breakers	Waivers
6	Meleana Shim	(United States)	25 September 1991 (age 35)	Santa Clara University	Discovery player
8	Angie Kerr	(United States)	29 March 1987 (age 39)	(United States) Sky Blue FC	Supplemental draft
10	Allie Long	(United States)	13 August 1987 (age 39)	(United States) New York Fury	Free Agent
12	Becky Edwards	(United States)	22 May 1988 (age 38)	(Sweden) Kristianstads DFF	Free agent
17	Tobin Heath	(United States)	29 May 1988 (age 38)	(France) Paris Saint-Germain	National team allocation
20	Courtney Wetzel	(United States)	25 February 1989 (age 37)	Oregon State University	Discovery player
21	Nikki Washington	(United States)	1 August 1988 (age 38)	(Australia) Canberra United FC	Free agent
Forwards
9	Danielle Foxhoven	(United States)	8 November 1989 (age 37)	(Russia) FC Energy Voronezh	Discovery player
12	Christine Sinclair (captain)	(Canada)	12 June 1983 (age 43)	(United States) Western New York Flash	National team allocation
13	Alex Morgan	(United States)	2 July 1989 (age 37)	(United States) Seattle Sounders Women	National team allocation
18	Jessica Shufelt	(United States)	29 May 1990 (age 36)	(Canada) Ottawa Fury Women	Supplemental draft

Last updated: May 20, 2013

== Competitions ==
All times Pacific Daylight Time (UTC−07:00)

=== Preseason ===
March 30, 2013	Portland Thorns FC	2—1	University of Portland	Portland, Oregon
19:00	Foxhoven 52'; Long 73'	Report	Frisbie 30'	Stadium: Merlo Field; Attendance: 4,892; Referee: Ekaterina Koroleva

=== Regular season ===
April 13, 2013 1	FC Kansas City	1–1	Portland Thorns FC	Overland Park, Kansas
17:35	Cuellar 3'; Mewis (yellow card) 43'	KC Report; Portland Report	Sinclair 66' (pen.); Washington (yellow card) 70'; Williamson (yellow card) 82'	Stadium: Shawnee Mission District Stadium; Attendance: 6,784; Referee: Kari Seitz

April 21, 2013 2	Portland Thorns FC	2–1	Seattle Reign FC	Portland, Oregon
14:00	Dougherty 45'; Morgan 52'; Kerr (yellow card) 8'; Long (yellow card) 11'; Washington (yellow card) 68'	Portland Report	Fishlock 74' (yellow card) 78'; Reed (yellow card) 30'; Nairn (yellow card) 33'	Stadium: Jeld-Wen Field; Attendance: 16,479; Referee: Josh Wilkens

April 27, 2013 3	Chicago Red Stars	0–2	Portland Thorns FC	Lisle, Illinois
17:00	Mautz (yellow card) 69'	Portland Report	Foxhoven 70'; Sinclair 81'	Stadium: Village Sports Complex; Attendance: 2,855; Referee: Donovan Noocha

May 4, 2013 4	Washington Spirit	1–2	Portland Thorns FC	Boyds, Maryland
16:00	Matheson 86' (pen.); Harris (yellow card) 13'	Portland Report	Morgan 12' (pen.); Washington 51'; Long (yellow card) 70'; Edwards (yellow card) 82'	Stadium: Maryland SoccerPlex; Attendance: 5,011; Referee: Christina Unkel

May 12, 2013 5	Chicago Red Stars	0–2	Portland Thorns FC	Lisle, Illinois
15:00	Mautz (yellow card) 54'	Portland Report	Morgan 3'; Long 34'; Buehler (yellow card) 52'	Stadium: Village Sports Complex; Attendance: 1,329; Referee: Kari Seitz

May 16, 2013 6	Portland Thorns FC	0–1	Sky Blue FC	Portland, Oregon
19:30	Sinclair (yellow card) 80'	Portland Report	Lytle 80'	Stadium: Jeld-Wen Field; Attendance: 11,055; Referee: Josh Wilkens

May 19, 2013 7	Portland Thorns FC	2–0	Washington Spirit	Portland, Oregon
14:00	Sinclair 41'; Morgan 86'; Marshall (yellow card) 65'	Portland Report	Gayle (yellow card) 83'	Stadium: Jeld-Wen Field; Attendance: 12,474; Referee: Robert Sibiga

May 25, 2013 8	Seattle Reign FC	0–1	Portland Thorns FC	Tukwila, Washington
19:00		Portland Report	Sinclair 84' (pen.); Edwards (yellow card) 30'; Morgan (yellow card) 38'; Dougherty (yellow card) 51'	Stadium: Starfire Stadium; Attendance: 3,324; Referee: Margaret Domka

June 1, 2013 9	Portland Thorns FC	0–2	Chicago Red Stars	Portland, Oregon
19:30	Edwards (yellow card) 41'; Guess (yellow card) 90'	Portland Report	Bywaters 35'; Santacaterina 61'; Chalupny (yellow card) 56'	Stadium: Jeld-Wen Field; Attendance: 12,446; Referee: Christina Unkel

June 6, 2013 10	Portland Thorns FC	4–3	FC Kansas City	Portland, Oregon
19:30	Morgan 13' (yellow card) 80'; Wetzel 20'; Foxhoven 48'; Long 66'	Portland Report	Cheney 34' (pen.), 56'; Tymrak 81'; Mathias (yellow card) 88'	Stadium: Jeld-Wen Field; Attendance: 10,886; Referee: Miguel Panduro, Jr.

June 16, 2013 11	Portland Thorns FC	2–0	Seattle Reign FC	Portland, Oregon
14:00	Foxhoven 48'; Shim 66'; Guess (yellow card) 39'; Washington (yellow card) 43'	Portland Report		Stadium: Jeld-Wen Field; Attendance: 13,802; Referee: Robert Sibiga

June 22, 2013 12	Sky Blue FC	0–0	Portland Thorns FC	Piscataway, New Jersey
16:00		Portland Report		Stadium: Yurcak Field; Attendance: 3,002; Referee: Kari Seitz

June 30, 2013 13	FC Kansas City	2–0	Portland Thorns FC	Overland Park, Kansas
13:10	Cheney 10'; Mathias 71'			Stadium: Shawnee Mission District Stadium; Attendance: 4,774; Referee: Christina Unkel

July 6, 2013 14	Portland Thorns FC	0–2	Boston Breakers	Portland, Oregon
19:30		Report	Leroux 11', 39'	Stadium: Jeld-Wen Field; Attendance: 12,436; Referee: Robert Sibiga

July 14, 2013 15	Portland Thorns FC	1–1	Western New York Flash	Portland, Oregon
14:00	Shim 39'	Report	Wambach 38'	Stadium: Jeld-Wen Field; Attendance: 13,021; Referee: Ted Unkel

July 21, 2013 16	Boston Breakers	1–2	Portland Thorns FC	Somerville, Massachusetts
13:00	Sanderson 13'	Report	Morgan 23'; Shim 86'	Stadium: Dilboy Stadium; Attendance: 2,978; Referee: Robert Sibiga

July 28, 2013 17	Portland Thorns FC	3–3	Chicago Red Stars	Portland, Oregon
14:00	Sinclair 23', 63'; Shim 55'	Report	Mautz 60', 75'; Sitch 86'	Stadium: Jeld-Wen Field; Attendance: 12,534; Referee: Kari Seitz

July 31, 2013 18	Portland Thorns FC	3–1	Sky Blue FC	Portland, Oregon
19:30 PST	Morgan 37'; Shim 65'; Long 73'	Report	Marshall 18' (o.g.)	Stadium: Jeld-Wen Field; Attendance: 13,769; Referee: Margaret Domka

August 4, 2013 19	Portland Thorns FC	2–3	FC Kansas City	Portland, Oregon
14:00	Foxhoven 51'; Morgan 89'; Buehler (yellow card) 90+4'	Summary	Holiday 23', 55'; Mewis 74'	Stadium: Jeld-Wen Field; Attendance: 17,619; Referee: (United States) John McCloskey

August 7, 2013 20	Boston Breakers	2–1	Portland Thorns FC	Somerville, Massachusetts
16:00	Sanderson 68'; O'Reilly 84'	Summary	Weimer 52'	Stadium: Dilboy Stadium; Attendance: 3,012; Referee: (United States) Elvis Mahmutovic

August 10, 2013 21	Western New York Flash	0–0	Portland Thorns FC	Rochester, New York
16:35	Adriana Martín (yellow card) 67'	Summary	Dalmy (yellow card) 90+1'	Stadium: Sahlen's Stadium; Attendance: 7,606; Referee: (United States) Maraget Domka

August 17, 2013 22	Seattle Reign FC	1–2	Portland Thorns FC	Tukwila, Washington
20:00	Rapinoe 3'	Summary	Sinclair 8', 83'; Marshall (yellow card) 69'; Shim (yellow card) 78'	Stadium: Starfire Stadium; Attendance: 3,855; Referee: (United States) Christina Unkel

=== Results summary ===
Overall								Home						Away					
Pld	Pts	W	L	T	GF	GA	GD	W	L	T	GF	GA	GD	W	L	T	GF	GA	GD
22	38	11	6	5	32	25	+7	5	4	2	19	17	+2	6	2	3	13	8	+5

Last updated: August 18, 2013
Pld = Matches played; Pts = Points; W = Matches won; T = Matches tied; L = Matches lost; GF = Goals for; GA = Goals against; GD = Goal difference

=== Results by round ===
Round	1	2	3	4	5	6	7	8	9	10	11	12	13	14	15	16	17	18	19	20	21	22
Stadium	A	H	A	A	A	H	H	A	H	H	H	A	A	H	H	A	H	H	H	A	A	A
Result	D	W	W	W	W	L	W	W	L	W	W	D	L	L	D	W	D	W	L	L	D	W
Position	2	1	1	1	1	2	2	2	2	2	2	2	3	3	3	3	3	3	3	3	3	3

Updated to match(es) played on August 18, 2013. Source:
A = Away; H = Home; W = Win; D = Draw; L = Loss

== Playoffs and Championship ==
See also 2013 NWSL playoffs and 2013 NWSL Championship.

24 August 2013 Semi Final	FC Kansas City	2—3 (a.e.t.)	Portland Thorns FC	Overland Park, Kansas
21:00	Tymrak 12'; Henderson 25'; Scott (yellow card) 72'; Buczkowski (yellow card) 86'	Summary	Heath 33'; Dalmy (yellow card) 50'; Long (yellow card) 60' (goal) 103'; Weimer 65'	Stadium: Shawnee Mission District Stadium; Attendance: 4,016; Referee: (United States) Christina Unkel

31 August 2013 Final	Western New York Flash	0—2	Portland Thorns FC	Rochester, New York
21:00	Johnson (yellow card) 33'; Adriana Martín (yellow card) 73'	Summary	Heath 40'; Williamson (yellow card) 49' (red card) 57'; Long (yellow card) 88'; Sinclair 90+2'	Stadium: Sahlen's Stadium; Attendance: 9,129; Referee: (United States) Kari Seitz

== Statistics ==
=== Team statistics ===
No.	Pos.	Name	League					Discipline	
No.	Pos.	Name	GP	GS	MP	G	A	Yellow card	Red card
1	GK	(Canada) Karina LeBlanc	21	21	1890	0	0	0	0
2	DF	(United States) Marian Dougherty	19	19	1666	1	1	2	0
3	MF	(United States) Elizabeth Guess	4	1	67	0	0	2	0
4	DF/MF	(United States) Emilee O'Neil	4	1	141	0	0	0	0
5	DF	(United States) Kathryn Williamson	22	22	1944	0	0	1	0
6	MF	(United States) Meleana Shim	19	17	1416	5	2	1	0
7	DF	(United States) Nikki Marshall	22	22	1871	0	1	1	0
8	MF	(United States) Angie Kerr	15	9	762	0	1	0	0
9	FW	(United States) Danielle Foxhoven	21	7	997	4	0	1	0
10	MF	(United States) Allie Long	22	22	1956	3	3	2	0
11	DF	(United States) Jazmyne Avant	4	2	212	0	0	0	0
12	FW	(Canada) Christine Sinclair	20	20	1783	8	2	2	0
13	FW	(United States) Alex Morgan	18	18	1525	8	5	4	0
14	MF	(United States) Becky Edwards	10	10	900	0	0	3	0
15	DF/MF	(United States) Casey Ramirez	4	1	159	0	0	0	0
16	DF	(United States) Rachel Buehler	20	20	1800	0	2	2	0
17	MF	(United States) Tobin Heath	7	7	630	0	3	4	0
18	FW	(United States) Jessica Shufelt	4	0	31	0	0	0	0
19	FW	(United States) Tiffany Weimer	10	5	522	1	1	0	0
20	MF	(United States) Courtney Wetzel	16	6	602	1	1	0	0
21	MF	(United States) Nikki Washington	11	10	776	1	2	3	0
24	DF	(United States) Tina Ellertson	3	0	40	0	0	0	0
26	GK	(United States) Cris Lewis	1	1	90	0	0	0	0
Portland Thorns FC			22		1980	32	24	29	0
Opponents			22		1980	25	19	18	0

Statistics accurate as of October 11, 2013

=== Goalkeeper stats ===
Last updated: October 11, 2013

No.	Nat	Player	MIN	GA	GAA	SV
1	(Canada)	Karina LeBlanc	1890	23	1.1	92
23	(United States)	Adelaide Gay	0	0	0	0
26	(United States)	Cris Lewis	90	2	2	0

== Honors ==
NWSL Player of the Month

Month	Result	Player	Ref
April	Won	(Canada) Christine Sinclair	

== Player Transactions ==
=== National Team Player Allocation ===
On January 11, 2013, the league held its player allocation for the national team players, with Portland receiving seven players: Rachel Buehler, Tobin Heath, Karina LeBlanc, Alex Morgan, Marlene Sandoval, Luz Saucedo, and Christine Sinclair. On January 23, 2013, Heath signed a six-month contract with Paris Saint-Germain and expected to join the Thorns FC once the French club's season is concluded. On March 21, 2013, Sandoval and Saucedo, the two allocated Mexico national team defenders, were removed from the team roster, due to an injury and decision by the Mexican Football Federation, respectively.

=== National Women's Soccer League College Draft ===
Each team in the NWSL got to pick once per round, with the draft order based on how well each team did in allocation. The Thorns picked eighth (last) in each round.

Date	Player	Pos	Previous club	Round (Overall)	Ref
January 18, 2013	(United States) Kathryn Williamson	DF	University of Florida	1 (8)	
January 18, 2013	(United States) Nicolette Radovcic	MF	University of Central Florida	2 (16)	
January 18, 2013	(United States) Amber Brooks	MF	University of North Carolina	3 (24)	
January 18, 2013	(South Africa) Roxanne Barker	GK	Pepperdine University	4 (32)	

=== Supplemental Draft Picks ===
Any player that wasn’t selected in the NWSL College Draft, and was done with her college eligibility, was eligible for the NWSL Supplemental Draft. The draft lasted six rounds. Again, the Thorns selected eighth (last) in each round.

Date	Player	Pos	Previous club	Pick (Overall)	Ref
February 7, 2013	(United States) Tina Ellertson	DF	(United States) magicJack (WPS)	1 (8)	
February 7, 2013	(United States) Angie Kerr	MF	(United States) Sky Blue FC	2 (16)	
February 7, 2013	(United States) Michele Weissenhofer	FW	(United States) Chicago Red Stars	3 (24)	
February 7, 2013	(United States) Marian Dougherty (Dalmy)	DF	(United States) magicJack (WPS)	4 (32)	
February 7, 2013	(United States) Jessica Shufelt	FW	(Canada) Ottawa Fury Women	5 (40)	

=== Transfers In ===
Date	Player	Pos	Previous club	Notes	Ref
April 24, 2013	(United States) Elizabeth Guess	MF	Boston Breakers	Signed off Waivers	

=== Transfers Out ===
Date	Player	Pos	Destination Club	Notes	Ref
