= 2013 NWSL Championship =

Women's soccer match in New York state

- Event: NWSL Championship
Western New York Flash	Portland Thorns FC
0	2
- Date: August 31, 2013
- Venue: Sahlen's Stadium, Rochester, New York, U.S.
- Most Valuable Player: Tobin Heath (Portland Thorns FC)
- Referee: Kari Seitz
- Attendance: 9,129

The 2013 NWSL Championship was the inaugural edition of the NWSL Championship, the championship match of the National Women's Soccer League (NWSL), and took place on August 31, 2013. It was contested between Portland Thorns FC and the Western New York Flash to determine the champion of the inaugural 2013 season. Portland won the match 2–0 at Western New York's home Sahlen's Stadium in Rochester, New York.

== Road to the final ==
=== Western New York Flash ===
The Western New York Flash, led by NWSL Golden Boot runner-up Abby Wambach, won the inaugural NWSL Shield by topping the 2013 regular-season standings on goal difference. They entered the playoffs in the semifinals as the top seed. In the semifinals, Carli Lloyd scored two goals to lead the Flash to a 2–0 win over the fourth seed Sky Blue FC.

=== Portland Thorns FC ===
Portland Thorns FC were predicted to perform well in the 2013 season on the strength of their attacking pair of Alex Morgan and Christine Sinclair. The internationals indeed led the Thorns to finish third in the standings—tied with the top on points—and set up a semifinal meeting with the second place FC Kansas City. In the semifinals, goals from Tobin Heath and Tiffany Weimer erased Kansas City's early 2–0 lead before Allie Long scored the 3–2 winner in extra time.

== Match ==
=== Details ===
August 31, 2013
8:00pm EDT

Western New York Flash	0–2	Portland Thorns FC
	Report; Report	Heath 40'; Sinclair 90+2'

Sahlen's Stadium, Rochester, New York
Attendance: 9,129
Referee: Kari Seitz

Western New York Flash	Portland Thorns FC

GK	24	(United States) Adrianna Franch
DF	13	(United States) Brittany Taylor
DF	16	(United States) Katherine Reynolds
DF	12	(United States) Estelle Johnson	(yellow card) 33'
DF	22	(United States) Amy Barczuk		(substituted off) 55'
MF	6	(United States) Angela Salem
MF	10	(United States) Carli Lloyd
MF	14	(United States) Sarah Huffman		(substituted off) 72'
FW	20	(United States) Abby Wambach
FW	8	(Spain) Adriana	(yellow card) 74'
FW	4	(Australia) Sam Kerr		(substituted off) 84'
Substitutes:
GK	1	(Mexico) Pamela Tajonar
MF	7	(United States) McCall Zerboni		(substituted in) 55'
MF	9	(United States) Ingrid Wells
MF	23	(Canada) Jodi-Ann Robinson		(substituted in) 84'
MF	17	(Mexico) Verónica Pérez
MF	11	(United States) Laura Heyboer
FW	15	(United States) Vicki DiMartino		(substituted in) 72'
Manager:
(New Zealand) Aaran Lines

GK	1	(Canada) Karina LeBlanc
DF	5	(United States) Kat Williamson	(yellow card) 49' (yellow-red card) 57'
DF	7	(United States) Nikki Marshall
DF	2	(United States) Marian Dougherty
DF	16	(United States) Rachel Buehler
MF	6	(United States) Meleana Shim
MF	10	(United States) Allie Long	(yellow card) 89'
MF	8	(United States) Angie Kerr		(substituted off) 80'
MF	17	(United States) Tobin Heath		(substituted off) 63'
FW	12	(Canada) Christine Sinclair
FW	9	(United States) Danielle Foxhoven		(substituted off) 71'
Substitutes:
GK	23	(United States) Adelaide Gay
DF	20	(United States) Courtney Wetzel		(substituted in) 80'
DF	15	(United States) Casey Ramirez
DF	24	(United States) Tina Ellertson	(yellow card) 90'	(substituted in) 63'
MF	4	(United States) Emilee O'Neil
FW	19	(United States) Tiffany Weimer
FW	13	(United States) Alex Morgan		(substituted in) 71'
Manager:
(England) Mark Parsons

Most Valuable Player:
(United States) Tobin Heath

Assistant referees:
Veronica Perez (United States)
Kyle Atkins (United States)
Fourth official:
Margaret Domka (United States)

Match rules

- 90 minutes.
- 30 minutes of extra time if necessary.
- Penalty shootout if scores still level.
- Maximum of three substitutions.
