= 2014 Western New York Flash season =

Western New York Flash
2014 Western New York Flash season
- President: Alexandra Sahlen
- Head coach: Aaran Lines
- Stadium: Sahlen's Stadium; Rochester, New York (Capacity: 13,768)
- NWSL: 7th
- Highest home attendance: 4,339 (Aug. 13 vs. Sky Blue FC)
- Lowest home attendance: 1,786 (June 18 vs. Chicago Red Stars)
- Average home league attendance: 3,177
Home colors	Away colors

The 2014 season was Western New York Flash's seventh season of existence, and the second in which they competed in the National Women's Soccer League, the top division of women's soccer in the United States.

== Club ==
=== Roster ===
Note: Flags indicate national team as defined under FIFA eligibility rules; some limited exceptions apply. Players may hold more than one non-FIFA nationality.

No.	Pos.	Nation	Player
1	GK	AUS	Lydia Williams
3	MF	USA	Courtney Wetzel
4	FW	AUS	Samantha Kerr
5	FW	USA	Courtney Verloo
6	DF	USA	Angela Salem
7	MF	USA	McCall Zerboni
8	FW	ESP	Sonia Bermudez
10	MF	USA	Carli Lloyd
11	FW	ESP	Adriana Martín
12	DF	USA	Kristen Edmonds

No.	Pos.	Nation	Player
13	DF	USA	Brittany Taylor
14	MF	ESP	Vicky Losada
15	FW	USA	Jasmyne Spencer
16	DF	USA	Katherine Reynolds
17	DF	USA	Kathryn Williamson
19	GK	USA	Kelsey Wys
20	FW	USA	Abby Wambach
22	DF	USA	Amy Barczuk
23	DF	USA	Haley Palmer
24	GK	USA	Adrianna Franch

== Match results ==
=== Regular season ===
April 13, 2014 1	Washington Spirit	1–3	Western New York Flash	Boyds, Maryland
16:00 EST	Barczuk 50'	Report	Losada 15', 67'; Taylor 54'	Stadium: Maureen Hendricks Field; Attendance: 2,306

April 19, 2014 2	Chicago Red Stars	1–0	Western New York Flash	Bridgeview, Illinois
17:45 CDT (UTC-05)	Johnston 59'	Report		Stadium: Toyota Park; Attendance: 15,743; Referee: Christina Unkel

May 3, 2014 3	Western New York Flash	1–1	Portland Thorns FC	Rochester, New York
	Bermudez 39'		McDonald 43'	Stadium: Sahlen's Stadium

May 7, 2014 4	Western New York Flash	2–1	FC Kansas City	Rochester, New York
	Kerr 38' Spencer 45+4'		Marlborough 57'	Stadium: Sahlen's Stadium

May 11, 2014 5	Western New York Flash	2–0	Sky Blue FC	Rochester, New York
	Wambach 48', 90+2'			Stadium: Sahlen's Stadium

May 17, 2014 6	Washington Spirit	3–2	Western New York Flash	Boyds, Maryland
	Taylor 11', 78' Williamson 71' (o.g.)		Wambach 18' Lloyd 30'	Stadium: Maureen Hendricks Field Maryland SoccerPlex

May 21, 2014 7	Portland Thorns FC	2–1	Western New York Flash	Portland, Oregon
	Long 16' McDonald 48'		Zerboni 57'	Stadium: Providence Park

May 25, 2014 8	Seattle Reign FC	2–2	Western New York Flash	Seattle, Washington
	Fishlock 45'; Little 90+2'		Wambach 17'; Lloyd 62'	Stadium: Memorial Stadium

May 31, 2014 9	Western New York Flash	1–2	Houston Dash	Rochester, New York
	Zerboni 44'		Ohai 50'; Burger 72'	Stadium: Sahlen's Stadium

Jun 4, 2014 10	FC Kansas City	1–0	Western New York Flash	Kansas City, Missouri
	Rodriguez 44'			Stadium: Durwood Soccer Stadium

Jun 7, 2014 11	Portland Thorns FC	0–5	Western New York Flash	Portland, Oregon
			Zerboni 11'; Lloyd {{goal|28,50} Kerr 32', 45+2'	Stadium: Providence Park

Jun 11, 2014 12	Houston Dash	2–1	Western New York Flash	Houston, Texas
	McCarty 39'; Noyola 65' (pen.)		Martin 62'	Stadium: BBVA Compass Stadium

June 18, 2014 13	Western New York Flash	2–0	Chicago Red Stars	Rochester, New York
18:00 EDT (UTC-04)	Taylor 2'; Losada (yellow card) 37'; Kerr 90+1'	Summary	Chalupny (yellow card) 13'; Hemmings (yellow card) 44'; Morway (yellow card) 50'; Santacaterina (yellow card) 85'	Stadium: Sahlen's Stadium; Attendance: 1,786; Referee: Mark Allatin

Jun 22, 2014 14	Western New York Flash	1–2	Seattle Reign FC	Rochester, New York
	Kerr 62'		Lloyd 83' (o.g.) Leroux 88'	Stadium: Sahlen's Stadium

Jun 27, 2014 15	Western New York Flash	2–1	Boston Breakers	Rochester, New York
	Lloyd 59', 83'		Ezurike 71'	Stadium: Sahlen's Stadium

Jul 2, 2014 16	Western New York Flash	1–2	Seattle Reign FC	Rochester, New York
	Losada 33'		Goebel 62' Fishlock 85'	Stadium: Sahlen's Stadium

Jul 5, 2014 17	Houston Dash	1–4	Western New York Flash	Houston, Texas
	Jackson 81'		Spencer 13' Kerr 28' Bermudez 80' Edwards 85' (o.g.)	Stadium: BBVA Compass Stadium

Jul 12, 2014 18	Western New York Flash	0–1	Washington Spirit	Rochester, New York
	Reynolds 54		Matheson 56' (p)	Stadium: Sahlen's Stadium

Jul 18, 2014 19	Western New York Flash	1–1	FC Kansas City	Rochester, New York
	Kerr 22'		Hagen 17'	Stadium: Sahlen's Stadium

Jul 25, 2014 20	Western New York Flash	2–4	Boston Breakers	Rochester, New York
	Spencer 14'; Lloyd 54'; Kerr (yellow card) 89'	= soccer&page = match&id = 1648580 Summary	Sanderson 27' (yellow card) 51'; O'Reilly 30' (pen.) 86'; Reeves 39'; Jones (yellow card) 89'	Stadium: Sahlen's Stadium; Attendance: 3,081; Referee: (United States) Timon Berry

Jul 31, 2014 21	Sky Blue FC	1–0	Western New York Flash	Piscataway, New Jersey
	Nadim (yellow card) 22'; Levin (yellow card) 39'; O'Hara 50'	= soccer&page = match&id = 1648586 Summary	Lloyd (yellow card) 26'; Bermúdez (yellow card) 55'	Stadium: Yurcak Field; Attendance: 3,471; Referee: (United States) Josh Wilkens

Aug 3, 2014 22	Boston Breakers	3–4	Western New York Flash	Boston, Massachusetts
18:30	Mewis 29' 76'; Reeves 74'	= soccer&page = match&id = 1648590 Summary	Wambach 8' 49'; Kerr 66'; Bermúdez 90+2'	Stadium: Harvard Stadium

Aug 13, 2014 23	Western New York Flash	2–3	Sky Blue FC	Rochester, New York
18:00	Martín 23'; Bermúdez 79'	Summary	O'Hara 24'; Nadim 48' 89'	Stadium: Sahlen's Stadium; Attendance: 4,339; Referee: (United States) Chris Spivey

Aug 16, 2014 24	Chicago Red Stars	3–3	Western New York Flash	Lisle, Illinois
19:00	Press 17' (pen.) 60'; Johnston 90+3'	Summary	Martín 29'; Lloyd 45'; Kerr 49'	Stadium: Benedictine U. Sports Complex Stadium

=== Standings ===
Pos	Team	Pld	W	D	L	GF	GA	GD	Pts	Qualification
1	Seattle Reign FC	24	16	6	2	50	20	+30	54	NWSL Shield
2	FC Kansas City (C)	24	12	5	7	39	32	+7	41	NWSL Playoffs
3	Portland Thorns FC	24	10	6	8	39	35	+4	36	NWSL Playoffs
4	Washington Spirit	24	10	5	9	36	43	−7	35	NWSL Playoffs
5	Chicago Red Stars	24	9	8	7	32	26	+6	35	
6	Sky Blue FC	24	9	7	8	30	37	−7	34	
7	Western New York Flash	24	8	4	12	42	38	+4	28	
8	Boston Breakers	24	6	2	16	37	53	−16	20	
9	Houston Dash	24	5	3	16	23	44	−21	18	

Source: NWSL
Rules for classification: Tiebreakers
(C) Champions

==== Results summary ====
Overall								Home						Away					
Pld	Pts	W	L	T	GF	GA	GD	W	L	T	GF	GA	GD	W	L	T	GF	GA	GD
24	28	8	12	4	42	38	+4	4	6	2	17	18	−1	4	6	2	25	20	+5

Last updated: August 16, 2014
Source: National Women's Soccer League
Pld = Matches played; Pts = Points; W = Matches won; T = Matches tied; L = Matches lost; GF = Goals for; GA = Goals against; GD = Goal difference

==== Results by round ====
Round	1	2	3	4	5	6	7	8	9	10	11	12	13	14	15	16	17	18	19	20	21	22	23	24
Stadium	A	A	H	H	H	A	A	A	H	A	A	A	H	H	H	H	A	H	H	H	A	A	H	A
Result	W	L	D	W	W	L	L	D	L	L	W	L	W	L	W	L	W	L	D	L	L	W	L	D

Updated to match(es) played on August 16, 2014. Source: National Women's Soccer League
A = Away; H = Home; W = Win; D = Draw; L = Loss

== Squad statistics ==
Note: only regular season squad statistics displayed

Key to positions: FW - Forward, MF - Midfielder, DF - Defender, GK - Goalkeeper

N	Pos	Player	GP	GS	Min	G	A	WG	Shot	SOG	Cro	CK	Off	Foul	FS	YC	RC
5	DF	Teigen Allen	4	2	258	0	0	0	1	1	0	0	0	3	2	2	0
22	DF	Amy Barczuk	19	9	886	0	0	0	3	0	0	0	0	10	7	0	0
8	DF	Sonia Bermudez	21	9	837	4	1	1	23	8	1	15	9	9	12	2	0
12	DF	Kristen Edmonds	22	19	1739	0	1	0	1	0	1	0	0	12	15	1	0
4	MF	Samantha Kerr	20	20	1660	9	4	1	53	24	0	0	20	9	14	1	0
18	FW	Emma Kete	3	0	25	0	0	0	0	0	0	0	1	0	0	0	0
10	MF	Carli Lloyd	19	19	1710	8	5	1	61	33	0	3	13	51	24	5	0
14	MF	Vicky Losada	23	18	1624	3	6	0	22	7	3	35	4	17	14	2	0
11	FW	Adriana Martin	19	12	1195	3	4	0	26	16	1	29	7	5	9	0	0
23	DF	Haley Palmer	7	5	357	0	1	0	0	0	0	0	0	2	3	0	0
16	DF	Katherine Reynolds	19	19	1628	0	0	0	3	0	3	0	2	12	7	2	1
6	MF	Angela Salem	23	22	1858	0	0	0	10	6	0	0	0	16	10	4	1
15	FW	Jasmyne Spencer	22	9	933	3	1	1	25	14	0	0	10	8	16	1	0
13	DF	Brittany Taylor	24	24	2160	2	1	2	6	5	0	0	0	15	16	2	0
5	FW	Courtney Verloo	1	0	1	0	0	0	0	0	0	0	0	0	0	0	0
20	FW	Abby Wambach	10	10	835	6	4	1	28	17	1	0	10	11	11	1	0
3	MF	Courtney Wetzel	8	0	122	0	0	0	1	0	0	0	0	2	1	0	0
17	DF	Kathryn Williamson	21	20	1699	0	0	0	2	1	0	0	0	10	12	2	0
7	MF	McCall Zerboni	24	23	2036	3	2	1	12	5	0	0	2	45	24	2	0

N	Pos	Goal keeper	GP	GS	Min	W	L	T	Shot	SOG	Sav	GA	GA/G	Pen	PKF	SO
25	GK	DiDi Haracic	1	1	90	0	0	1	21	10	7	3	3.000	2	3	0
1	GK	Lydia Williams	14	14	1183	6	6	1	125	65	49	15	1.071	1	1	2
19	GK	Kelsey Wys	10	9	887	2	6	2	143	66	47	20	2.000	2	2	1

== See also ==
- 2014 National Women's Soccer League season
