= Casey Ramirez =

American soccer defender (born 1989)

Personal information
- Full name: Casey Anne Ramirez
- Date of birth: December 8, 1989 (age 36)
- Place of birth: Yardley, Pennsylvania, U.S.
- Height: 5 ft 2 in (1.57 m)
- Position: Defender

College career
Years	Team	Apps	(Gls)
2008–2011	Syracuse Orange		

Senior career*
Years	Team	Apps	(Gls)
2010–2012	Ottawa Fury		
2012	Fortuna Hjørring		(0)
2013	Portland Thorns FC	4	(0)
- * Club domestic league appearances and goals as of December 22, 2013 (UTC)

Casey Anne Ramirez (born December 8, 1989) is an American soccer defender who most recently played for the Portland Thorns FC of the National Women's Soccer League (NWSL - 2013 National Champions). She previously played for Fortuna Hjørring in Denmark's Elitedivisionen (Champions League) and for the Ottawa Fury (2012 - W League Champions).

== Early life ==
Born to Joe and Phyllis Ramerez, Casey was raised in Yardley, Pennsylvania, where she attended The Pennington School. A committed athlete, Ramirez played soccer, softball, basketball, lacrosse and ran track for the school. During her junior year, she helped the soccer team win the McDonough Tournament in Baltimore. The team was ranked first in the country. The same year, Ramirez was named to the Trenton Times First-Team All-Prep "A" team as a midfielder. During her senior year, she captained the team to the New Jersey state title for the fourth consecutive year and was named for a second time to the Trenton Times First-Team All-Prep "A" team – this time as a defender. In 2024, Casey was inducted into Pennington School Athletic Hall of Fame.

=== Syracuse University ===
Ramirez attended Syracuse University, where she played for the Syracuse Orange from 2008 to 2011. In 2009, Ramirex earned the BIG EAST Women's Soccer Defensive Play of the Week for her performance. She made 75 appearances as a defender for the team scoring 3 goals and serving 4 assists. Casey served as team captain during the 2010 and 2011 seasons. She was named Syracuse Rookie of the Year in 2009 and Syracuse Defender of the Year in both 2010 and 2011.

== Club career ==
=== Fortuna Hjørring, 2012 ===
Ramirez signed with Fortuna Hjørring in Denmark's Elitedivisionen for the 2012–13 season. The team finished second during regular season play. Ramirez made two appearances for the club during the 2012–13 UEFA Women's Champions League Round of 16.

=== Portland Thorns FC, 2013 ===
Ramirez was signed by the Portland Thorns FC as a discovery player a couple of months into inaugural 2013 season with the National Women's Soccer League. Of the signing, Thorns FC head coach Cindy Parlow Cone said, "Casey is a very good attacking outside back or midfielder. She is very difficult to beat one-on-one and is great at helping to build the attack out of the back." She made four appearances for the club during the regular season tallying 160 minutes. February 8, 2014 the Thorns released Ramirez. The Portland Thorns won the inaugural NWSL National Championship.

== Honors ==
Portland Thorns FC

- NWSL Championship: 2013

Ottawa Fury

- W-League National Championship: 2012
- W-League Finalist: 2011
- 2012 Ottawa Sport Hall of Fame (inducted in May, 2025)

Syracuse University

- Syracuse Captain: 2010,2011
- Syracuse Soladay Award Finalist: 2011
- Syracuse Defender of the Year: 2010, 2011
- Syracuse Rookie of the Year: 2009

Pennington:

- Pennington School Athletic Hall of Fame (inducted in 2024)
- Trenton Times First-Team All-Prep "A" as a defender: 2007
- Trenton Times First-Team All Prep "A" as a midfield: 2006
