= Amy Barczuk =

American soccer player (born 1990)

Personal information
- Full name: Amy Elizabeth Barczuk
- Date of birth: October 28, 1990 (age 35)
- Place of birth: Centennial, Colorado
- Height: 5 ft 10 in (1.78 m)
- Position: Defender

Youth career
- Riverside Renegades

College career
Years	Team	Apps	(Gls)
2009–2012	Colorado Buffaloes		

Senior career*
Years	Team	Apps	(Gls)
2013–2014	Western New York Flash	28	(0)
2013	Zorky Krasnogorsk	7	(0)
2015	Boston Breakers	20	(0)

International career
2011	United States U23		
- * Club domestic league appearances and goals as of August 30, 2015

Amy Elizabeth Barczuk (born October 28, 1990) is a retired American professional soccer player. She was a defender for the Western New York Flash and Boston Breakers in the National Women's Soccer League.

== Early life ==
Barczuk grew up in Centennial, Colorado and attended Arapahoe High School where she lettered three years in soccer and led her team to state semi-finals in her sophomore and senior years. As a sophomore, Barczuk was named second-team All-League. As a senior, she earned first-team All-League, 5A All-State and All-Colorado honors.

As a youth, Barczuk played club soccer for the Riverside Renegades, helping lead them to three State Cup Championships in 2003, 2004 and 2008. She was named State Cup MVP in 2009. In 2007, she was a member of the Colorado Olympic Development team and was selected for the 2007 Region IV pool. In 2008, Barczuk was awarded the Sportswomen of Colorado "All-Around" Award.

=== University of Colorado ===
Barczuk attended the University of Colorado where she played for the Buffaloes from 2009 to 2012. As a freshman, she was the only freshman to start all 19 of the team's matches. She logged the second most minutes played with 1,607, and scored one goal. Barczuk's was named to the 2009 All-Big 12 Conference second team and the Big 12 All-Newcomer Team. As a sophomore in 2010, Barczuk played in all 20 of Colorado's matches logging 18 starts and playing 1,822 minutes. She finished the season with five points on two goals and an assist and tied for first on the teamwith the most shots attempted at 41. Barczuk's 41 shots ranked 10th on Colorado's offensive class list for sophomores. During her junior season, Barczuk started all 19 games, totaling 1,553 minutes and served one assist. She had a career-high three goals and seven points during the season. Barczuk earned CU Athlete of the Week honors. In her final season at Colorado, she was elected captain and broke numerous records. She became one of only eight players in the school's soccer program history to have started at least 76 of 78 games played. Her 76 starts and 78 games played rank ninth and 12th on CU's all-time list. She also ranked sixth with 6,849 minutes played. Barczuk scored four goals and contributed one assist, ranking second on the team in goals, points and shots on goal (17 off 32 shots).

== Club career ==
=== Western New York Flash ===
In 2013, Barczuk was drafted to the Western New York Flash in the National Women's Soccer League. She was selected during the second round (fourteenth overall) of the 2013 NWSL College Draft. She made her debut with the squad during the team's inaugural match against Sky Blue FC.

=== Boston Breakers ===
November 3, 2014 the Western New York Flash traded Barczuk to the Boston Breakers for a second round pick—18th overall—in the 2015 NWSL College Draft; a pick that became Tatiana Coleman. On February 1, 2016, it was announced that Barczuk would be retiring from professional soccer.

== International career ==
Barczuk was a member of the United States under-23 women's national soccer team player pool.

== Honors ==
Western New York Flash

- NWSL Shield: 2013
