= Elizabeth Guess =

American soccer player (born 1985)

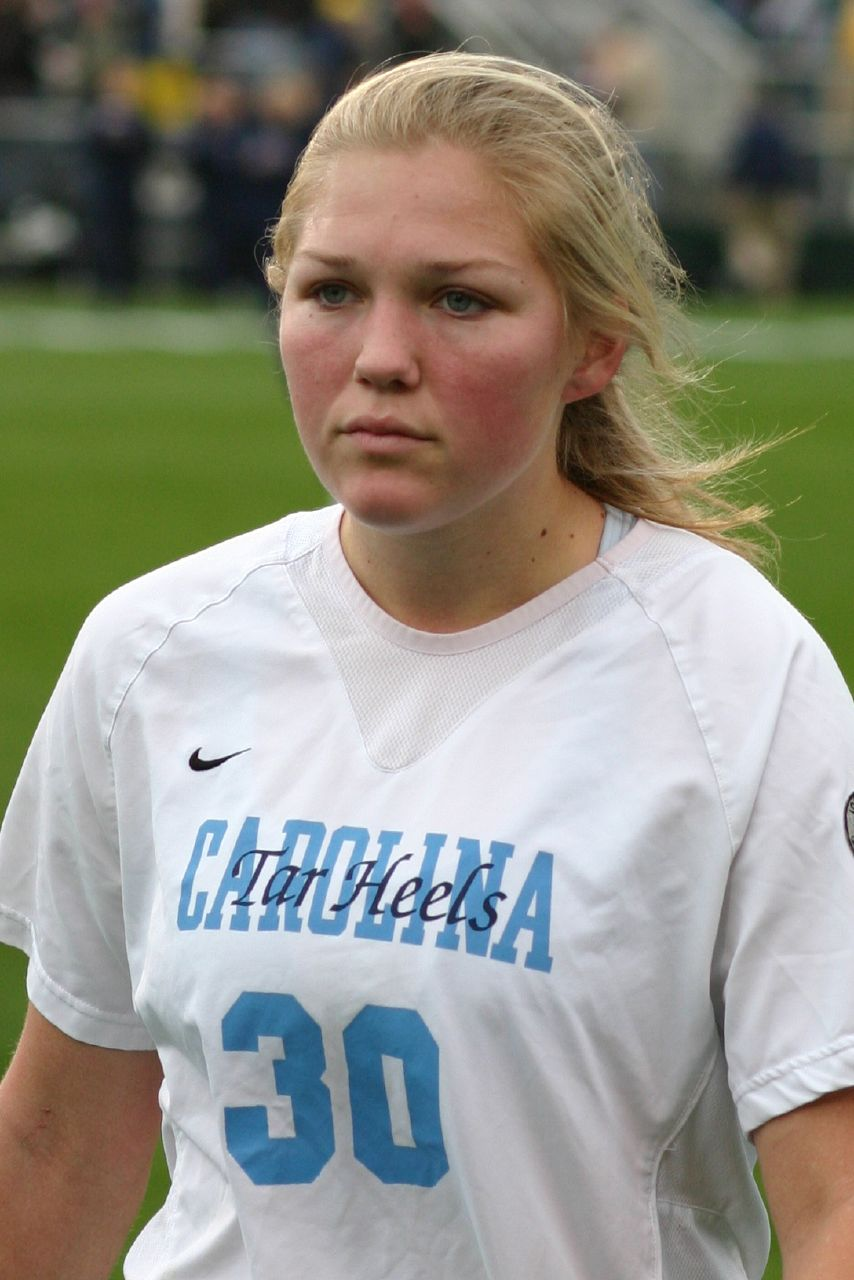
- Guess in 2006

Personal information
- Full name: Laurie Elizabeth Guess
- Date of birth: January 11, 1985 (age 41)
- Place of birth: Athens, Georgia, U.S.
- Height: 5 ft 7 in (1.70 m)
- Positions: Forward; midfielder

College career
Years	Team	Apps	(Gls)
2003–2006	North Carolina Tar Heels		

Senior career*
Years	Team	Apps	(Gls)
2008	SoccerPlus Connecticut	5	(2)
2009	Atlanta Silverbacks	6	(1)
2012	Atlanta Silverbacks	11	(5)
2012	ADO Den Haag	11	(4)
2013	Boston Breakers	1	(0)
2013	Portland Thorns FC	4	(0)

International career^{‡}
- United States U-23
- * Club domestic league appearances and goals as of April 28, 2013 (UTC) ‡ National team caps and goals as of April 12, 2013 (UTC)

Laurie Elizabeth Guess (born January 11, 1985) is an American soccer forward and midfielder. She last played for the Portland Thorns FC in the National Women's Soccer League.

== Youth and college career ==
Guess was born in Athens, Georgia. She attended and played for Athens Academy in Athens, Georgia, where she received several honors and awards. Guess was a highly recruited high school All-American in high school. Guess was a 2003 McDonald's All-American, 2003 Parade All-American and 2003 NSCAA All-American. She led her team in scoring and assists all three years and was first-team All-Northeast Georgia each year. In addition to excelling in soccer, Guess also played four years of basketball as a point guard and led her basketball team in scoring, assists, steals and free throw shooting three times. Guess was named All-Northeast Georgia her freshman through senior years, first-team All-State selection as a senior, honorable mention as a sophomore and All-Area as a senior as well as the All-Northeast Georgia player of the Year as a senior.

Guess attended the University of North Carolina. While at North Carolina she played with current Breakers teammates Heather O'Reilly and Cat Whitehill. Guess also won two NCAA National Championships and three Atlantic Coast Conference Championships with the Tar Heels during her four-year college career.

== Club career ==
=== Boston Breakers ===
Guess was signed by the Boston Breakers as a discovery player in April 2013. After playing only one game with the Breakers in which she provided the assist to the Breaker's lone and equalizer goal, Guess was waived by the team.

=== Portland Thorns FC ===
Shortly after being waived by the Breakers, Guess was acquired by the Portland Thorns FC. She was waived by the Portland Thorns in January 2014.

== International career ==
Guess was a member of the U.S. Under-16, Under-17 National Teams, U-23 Women's National Team and a pool player for the U.S. Under-21 National Team in 2005 and the U.S. Under-19 National Team.

== Personal ==
Her parents are Ed and Page Allen and Amy and Frank Guess. She has two brothers and two sisters.
