= Cris Lewis =

American soccer player

Personal information
- Full name: Cris Marie Lewis
- Date of birth: May 10, 1988 (age 38)
- Place of birth: Burien, Washington, U.S.
- Height: 5 ft 5 in (1.65 m)
- Position: Goalkeeper

College career
Years	Team	Apps	(Gls)
2006–2009	Portland State Vikings		

Senior career*
Years	Team	Apps	(Gls)
2013–2014	Portland Thorns FC	1	(0)
- * Club domestic league appearances and goals

Cris Marie Lewis (born May 10, 1988) is an American former soccer goalkeeper who played for Portland State University and for the Portland Thorns of the National Women's Soccer League.

== Career ==
=== Youth career ===
Lewis "was a member of Kennedy High School's 2002 Washington state championship team."

=== College career ===
Lewis played at Portland State University for four years, being selected as an All-Big Sky Conference selection in all four years an as conference defensive MVP in 2009 as a senior. As of 2013, she held the Vikings all-time career records in saves (375), shutouts (17) and wins (24).

=== Professional career ===
In the leadup to the first season of the National Women's Soccer League in 2013, Lewis trained with the team in preseason as an amateur. On May 30, 2013, Portland Thorns FC, playing in the first season of the National Women's Soccer League, called up Lewis as an amateur player. This was in response to missing all four of their allocated national team players, including starting goalkeeper Karina LeBlanc of the Canadian national team, to international duty.

On June 1, 2013, Lewis debuted for the Thorns against the Chicago Red Stars, playing all 90 minutes in a 0–2 loss. On June 16, Lewis was an unused substitute for a game Portland played against the Seattle Reign. In 2014, when Portland was missing five players to international duty, they on June 12 added Lewis as one of four amateur players to shore up the roster leading up to their June 15 game against the Washington Spirit. She did not make the gameday roster. As a result, her 2013 appearance against the Chicago Red Stars is her only appearance to date as a professional.

=== Coaching career ===
After graduating from college in 2010, Lewis was goalkeeper coach for Pacific University in 2011, before becoming goalkeeper coach for Clark College in 2012 and 2013. In her second and final year at Clark, the Penguins went 10–4–2.

Lewis received her "C" coaching license from US Soccer in May 2014. Lewis was a volunteer assistant coach at Portland State University in 2014, and was a full-time assistant in 2015 and 2016. Lewis was hired as an Assistant Coach for the University of Oregon's women's soccer team in 2018.

== Personal life ==
Lewis graduated in 2010 from PSU with a degree in physical education and exercise, minoring in Spanish, and was also a three-time Big Sky all-academic honoree.
