= Sarah Huffman =

American soccer player (born 1984)

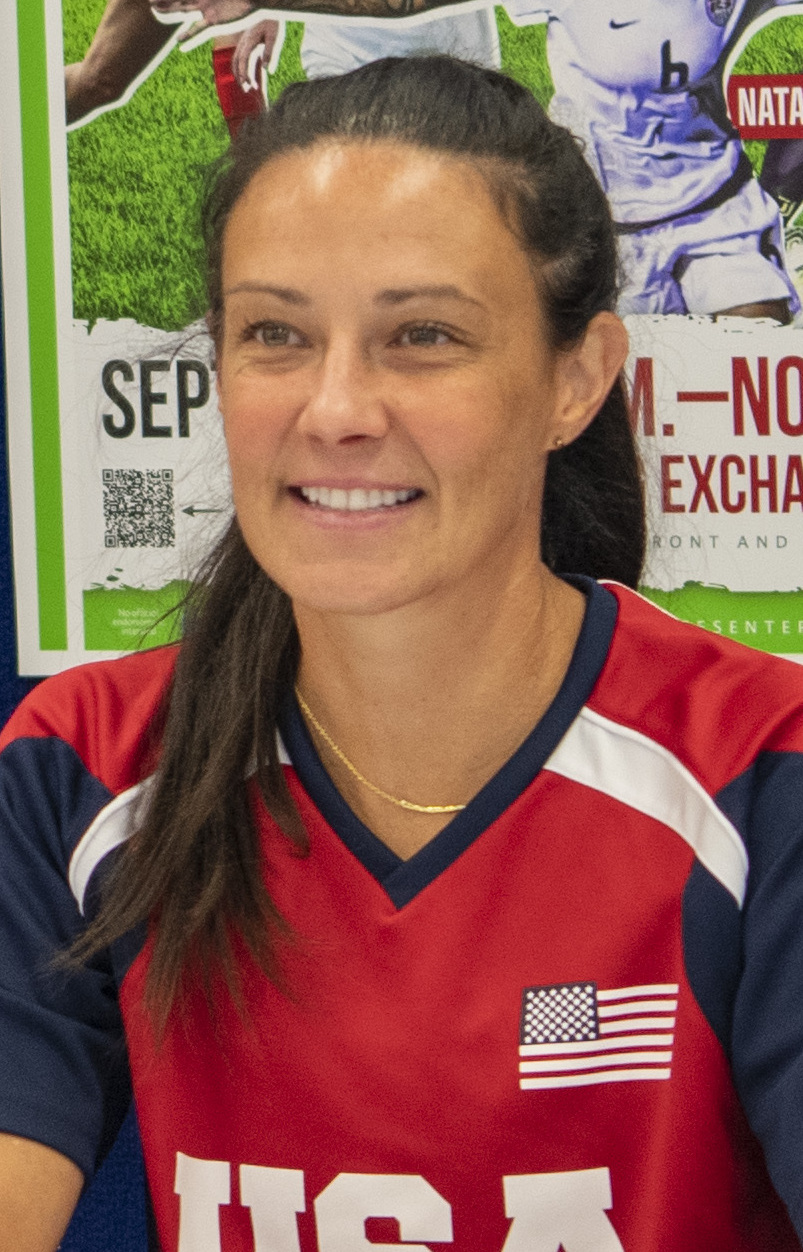
- Huffman in 2021

Personal information
- Full name: Sarah Eileen Huffman
- Date of birth: March 5, 1984 (age 42)
- Place of birth: Danbury, Connecticut, United States
- Height: 5 ft 4 in (1.63 m)
- Position: Midfielder

College career
Years	Team	Apps	(Gls)
2002–2005	Virginia Cavaliers		

Senior career*
Years	Team	Apps	(Gls)
2007–2008	Washington Freedom Reserves	17	(2)
2008	Røa IL	13	(14)
2009–2010	Washington Freedom	22	(1)
2011	magicJack	18	(1)
2012	Pali Blues	6	(3)
2013	Western New York Flash	14	(0)
2014	Portland Thorns	22	(1)

International career^{‡}
2000–2002	United States U-19		
2003–2007	United States U-21		
2010	United States	1	(0)
- * Club domestic league appearances and goals as of July 23, 2014 ‡ National team caps and goals as of July 13, 2010

Sarah Eileen Huffman (born March 5, 1984) is an American former professional soccer player who played as a midfielder.

== Early life ==
Huffman was born in Danbury, Connecticut. She grew up in Flower Mound, Texas and attended Marcus High School.

=== University of Virginia ===
Huffman attended the University of Virginia. A four-year starter, she is one of the top players in the school's history. She was a two-time NSCAA All-American, a two-time Soccer America MVP, and a three-time first team All-ACC selection.

In 2004, she was named the ACC Defensive Player of the Year and was also Co-MVP of the ACC Tournament as the Cavaliers won the first conference championship in school history. She was named Virginia State Player of the Year and was a finalist for Soccer Buzz National Player of the Year.

As a senior in 2005, she was named Soccer Buzz All-American, Soccer America MVP, and NSCAA All-American.

She ended her collegiate career with 12 goals and 28 assists (second most assists in school history).

== Playing career ==
=== Club ===
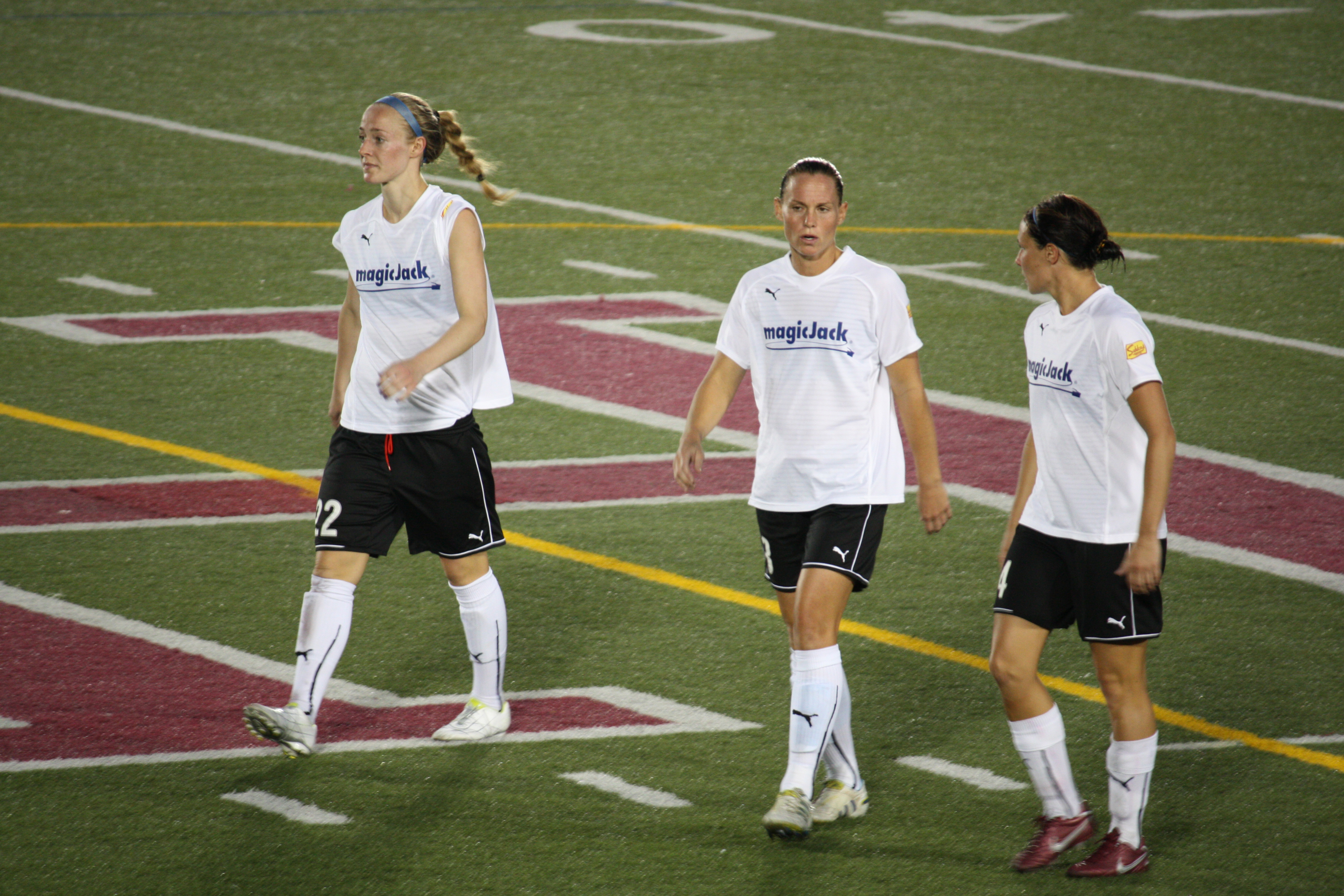
Huffman with magicJack teammates Becky Sauerbrunn and Christie Rampone in August 2011

Huffman was a member of the 2007 W-League champion, Washington Freedom.

In 2008, she played for Norwegian team, Røa IL, and helped the team win the Norwegian Women's Cup.

In 2009, Huffman was the number one pick in Round 1 of the 2008 WPS General Draft and signed with the Washington Freedom in Women's Professional Soccer. Under new ownership, the team moved to Florida and was renamed magicJack (WPS).

In 2012, after the WPS folded, Huffman signed with the Pali Blues in the W-League. She helped the team to an undefeated season and the Western Conference championship title.

In 2013, Huffman signed with the Western New York Flash.

April 5, 2014 Huffman was traded with a player to be named later to the Portland Thorns for Courtney Wetzel, Kathryn Williamson, and a first-round pick in the 2015 NWSL College Draft. That pick later became Jaelene Hinkle. Huffman had earlier decided to live in Portland in the house she bought with her spouse Abby Wambach, who will play 2014 with Western New York Flash. April 7, 2014, Portland Thorns revealed that the player to be named later was Verónica Boquete.

On November 18, 2014, Huffman announced her retirement from professional soccer.

=== International ===
Huffman was a member of the U-16, U-17, U-19, U-21, and U-23 United States women's national soccer teams. She helped her team win the 2002 FIFA U-19 Women's World Championship and won the Nordic Cup with the U-21s in 2004, 2005, and 2007.

In 2010, she was called to play with the United States women's national soccer team.

== Coaching career ==
Huffman is a volunteer assistant coach at her alma mater, University of Virginia.

== Personal life ==
Huffman resides in Portland, Oregon. Her nickname is "Huffy." Huffman came out as gay in a statement on the Athlete Ally website supporting equality in sports. On October 5, 2013, she married her longtime girlfriend, Abby Wambach, in Hawaii. In September 2016, in a new autobiography, Wambach announced that she and Huffman were divorcing. Their divorce was finalized in 2016.

== Honors ==
Western New York Flash

- NWSL Shield: 2013

Individual

- ACC Defensive Player of the Year: 2004
