= Jessica Shufelt =

American soccer player

Personal information
- Full name: Jessica Rose Shufelt
- Date of birth: May 29, 1990 (age 36)
- Place of birth: Rochester, New York, U.S.
- Height: 5 ft 7 in (1.70 m)
- Position: Striker

College career
Years	Team	Apps	(Gls)
2008–2011	Connecticut Huskies		

Senior career*
Years	Team	Apps	(Gls)
2011–2012	Ottawa Fury Women	23	(10)
2013	Portland Thorns	2	(0)
2013	Mallbackens IF	11	(1)
2014	Yzeure Allier	8	(1)
- * Club domestic league appearances and goals

Jessica Rose Shufelt (born May 29, 1990) is an American soccer forward who played for Portland Thorns FC.

== Youth career ==
Shufelt was a forward at the University of Connecticut. She scored 11 times for the Huskies adding 10 assists. During the summers of 2011 and 2012 Shufelt also played for the Ottawa Fury Women in the W-League.

== Professional career ==
On February 7, 2013, she was taken in the 5th round of the 2013 NWSL Supplemental Draft by the Portland Thorns.
