= Courtney Wetzel =

American soccer midfielder (born 1989)

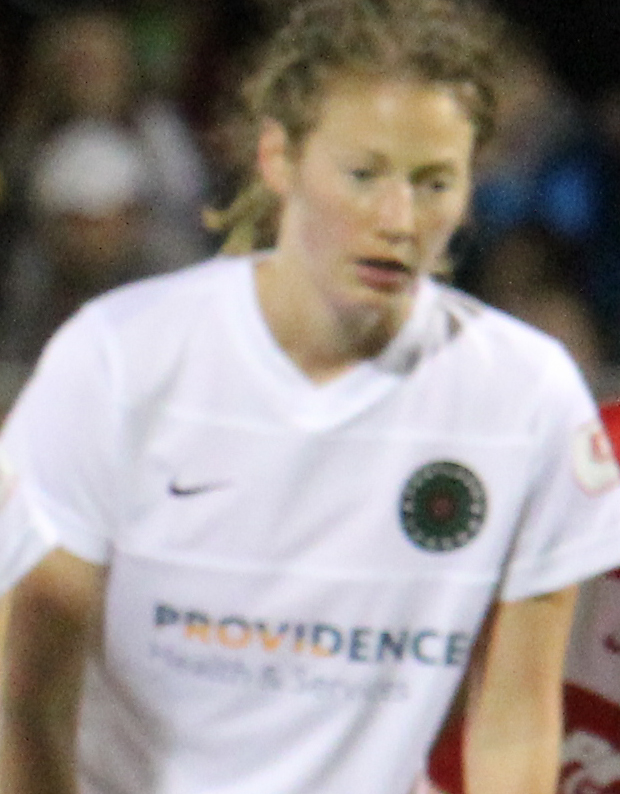
- Portland Thorns FC, 2013

Personal information
- Full name: Courtney Rashelle Wetzel
- Date of birth: February 25, 1989 (age 37)
- Place of birth: Puyallup, Washington, United States
- Height: 5 ft 7 in (1.70 m)
- Position: Midfielder

College career
Years	Team	Apps	(Gls)
2007–2010	Oregon State Beavers		

Senior career*
Years	Team	Apps	(Gls)
2007	Seattle Sounders Women	8	(0)
2008–2011	Ottawa Fury Women	27	(5)
2011–2012	SC Sand	7	(0)
2012	Ottawa Fury Women	7	(1)
2013	Portland Thorns	18	(1)
2014	WNY Flash	8	(0)

International career
2010	United States U23		
- * Club domestic league appearances and goals

Courtney Rashelle Wetzel (born February 25, 1989) is an American soccer midfielder who last played professionally in 2014. She played for the Western New York Flash and Portland Thorns FC of the NWSL, and the Ottawa Fury Women and Seattle Sounders Women in the W-League.

== Early life ==
Wetzel was born in Puyallup, Washington and began playing soccer as a young girl. Starting at age eight, she played for club soccer team, FC Royals, a team she won five state championships with. She attended Puyallup High School where she played on the varsity soccer team for three years. She finished her high school career with 47 goals and 17 assists. As a senior, she was named to the all-state second team after scoring 19 goals.

Wetzel also played for the Washington state and Region IV Olympic Development Program (ODP) teams. She won the 2004 national championship title with the Washington state ODP team and was a finalist in 2005.

=== Oregon State Beavers ===
Wetzel attended Oregon State University from 2007 to 2010. She ended her collegiate career with 81 caps for the Beavers and seven goals. She also appeared in two games for the women's basketball team.

== Club career ==
Wetzel played for the Seattle Sounders Women in 2007 and Ottawa Fury Women in the W-League in 2008 and played for the Fury for four seasons. She was named to the W-League Team of the Week in 2012 after scoring a goal and serving an assist during a shutout win against Hamilton.

On April 5, 2013 she joined the Portland Thorns FC for the 2013 NWSL season as a discovery player. She scored her first goal for the Thorns during a home match on June 7 against FC Kansas City. Wetzel made 18 appearances for the Thorns during the 2013 season and helped the team win the league's championship title.

On April 5, 2014, Wetzel was traded with Kathryn Williamson and Portland's first-round pick in the 2015 NWSL College Draft to the Western New York Flash for Sarah Huffman and a player to be named later. April 7, 2014, Portland Thorns revealed that the player to be named later was Verónica Boquete. The draft pick became Jaelene Hinkle.

She was waived by the Western New York Flash in September 2014.

== International career ==
Wetzel was called up to the United States women's national under-23 soccer team in 2010.

== Honors ==
Portland Thorns FC

- NWSL Championship: 2013
