= Emilee O'Neil =

American soccer player (born 1983)

Personal information
- Full name: Emilee Sukja O'Neil
- Birth name: Emilee Sukja Shim
- Date of birth: March 26, 1983 (age 43)
- Place of birth: Atlanta, Georgia, U.S.
- Height: 5 ft 7 in (1.70 m)
- Positions: Midfielder; defender

College career
Years	Team	Apps	(Gls)
2001–2004	Stanford Cardinal		

Senior career*
Years	Team	Apps	(Gls)
2012	Bay Area Breeze	10	(0)
2013	Portland Thorns FC	4	(0)
- * Club domestic league appearances and goals as of April 13, 2013

Emilee Sukja O'Neil (née Shim; born March 26, 1983) is an American soccer player who plays as a midfielder and a defender. She most recently played for the Portland Thorns FC of the National Women's Soccer League.

== Career ==
=== Youth and college career ===
O'Neil attended Stanford University where she majored in Human Biology.

=== Professional career ===
O'Neil came to the Portland Thorns FC as a trialist before being named to their opening day roster for the inaugural 2013 season with the National Women's Soccer League. February 8, 2014, the Portland Thorns released O'Neil.

== Personal ==
Parents Tom Shim and Martha Abbott-Shim. Stepped away from soccer after graduating from Stanford. Married husband Michael O'Neil in 2009.

== Honors ==
Portland Thorns FC

- NWSL Championship: 2013
