= Adriana Martín =

Spanish international footballer

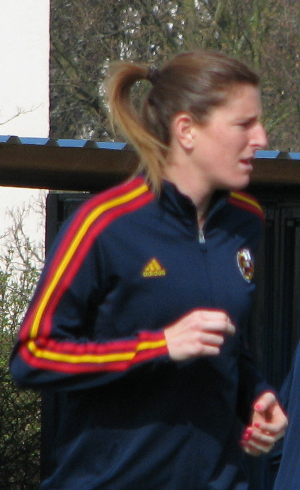

Personal information
- Full name: Adriana Martín Santamaría
- Date of birth: 7 November 1986 (age 39)
- Place of birth: La Puebla de Valverde, Aragon, Spain
- Height: 1.75 m (5 ft 9 in)
- Position: Forward

Team information
- Current team: Lazio
- Number: 10

Senior career*
Years	Team	Apps	(Gls)
2002–2003	Barcelona		
2003–2004	Sabadell		
2004–2005	Barcelona		
2005–2009	Espanyol		(78)
2009–2011	Rayo Vallecano		(61)
2011	Pozuelo		
2011	Sky Blue FC	15	(3)
2011–2012	Atlético Madrid	26	(21)
2012	Western New York Flash	11	(15)
2012	Chelsea	5	(1)
2012–2013	Atlético Madrid	10	(3)
2013–2014	Western New York Flash	34	(6)
2014–2017	Levante	59	(31)
2017–2020	Málaga		
2020–2021	Lazio	34	(29)

International career
- Spain U19
2005–2015	Spain	37	(33)
- * Club domestic league appearances and goals as of 22:44, 6 June 2021 (UTC)

Adriana Martín Santamaría (born 7 November 1986), commonly known as Adriana, is a Spanish international footballer who plays as a forward for Lazio. She previously played for Chelsea Ladies in England and Western New York Flash and Sky Blue FC in the United States, as well as Atlético Madrid, FC Barcelona, CE Sabadell, RCD Espanyol, Rayo Vallecano, Levante UD and Málaga CF in Spain. She has won three Spanish leagues and two national cups, and was the league's top scorer in 2007, 2010, and 2015.

== Club career ==
Adriana played in the Champions League with Espanyol and Rayo Vallecano, scoring 10 goals in 12 games.

In August 2012, Adriana agreed to play the last six games of the FA WSL season with Chelsea Ladies. In early 2013, she signed with the Western New York Flash for the inaugural season of the NWSL. She played for Levante from 2014 to 2017.

In the summer of 2017, she signed with Málaga CF of the Spanish Segunda División. She was the first signing under new coach Antonio Contreras, who she had also played under at Levante.

Adriana agreed to sign for Lazio in July 2020. She scored 26 goals in 26 games to secure the club's promotion to Serie A.

== International career ==
Adriana has been a longstanding member of the Spanish national team. In the qualification stage for the 2011 World Cup she scored 16 goals.

In October 2012 Adriana scored in Spain's 3–2 extra time win over Scotland in the second leg of the UEFA Women's Euro 2013 qualifying play-off. The Spanish looked to be heading out when Veró Boquete had missed a penalty three minutes before hitting the winning goal on 122 minutes. Adriana had also scored Spain's goal in the first leg, a 1–1 draw at Hampden Park.

In June 2013, national team coach Ignacio Quereda confirmed Adriana as a member of his 23-player squad for the UEFA Women's Euro 2013 finals in Sweden. She was not named to the final Spanish roster for the 2015 FIFA Women's World Cup, despite being named on a preliminary 35-player roster.

== Career statistics ==
=== Club ===
Club	Season	League			Playoffs (Note: Includes NWSL Playoffs)		Total	
Club	Season	Division	Apps	Goals	Apps	Goals	Apps	Goals
Western New York Flash	2013	NWSL	15	3	2	0	17	3
Western New York Flash	2014	NWSL	19	3	—		19	3
Career total			34	6	2	0	36	6

=== International ===
Scores and results list Spain's goal tally first, score column indicates score after each Martín goal.

List of international goals scored by Adriana Martín
No.	Date	Venue	Opponent	Score	Result	Competition	Ref.
1	November 5, 2005	Las Rozas, Spain	Denmark	2–1	2–2	2007 World Cup qualification	
2	March 30, 2006	Aranda de Duero, Spain	Poland	1–0	7–0	2007 World Cup qualification	
3	March 30, 2006	Aranda de Duero, Spain	Poland	2–0	7–0	2007 World Cup qualification	
4	March 30, 2006	Aranda de Duero, Spain	Poland	4–0	7–0	2007 World Cup qualification	
5	March 30, 2006	Aranda de Duero, Spain	Poland	6–0	7–0	2007 World Cup qualification	
6	March 30, 2006	Aranda de Duero, Spain	Poland	7–0	7–0	2007 World Cup qualification	
7	April 22, 2006	Brussels, Belgium	Belgium	1–0	4–2	2007 World Cup qualification	
8	April 22, 2006	Brussels, Belgium	Belgium	4–0	4–2	2007 World Cup qualification	
9	October 27, 2007	Plzeň, Czech Republic	Czech Republic	1–1	2–2	Euro 2009 qualifying	
10	September 19, 2009	Ta' Qali, Malta	Malta	2–0	13–0	2011 World Cup qualification	
11	September 19, 2009	Ta' Qali, Malta	Malta	3–0	13–0	2011 World Cup qualification	
12	September 19, 2009	Ta' Qali, Malta	Malta	5–0	13–0	2011 World Cup qualification	
13	September 19, 2009	Ta' Qali, Malta	Malta	9–0	13–0	2011 World Cup qualification	
14	October 24, 2009	Córdoba, Spain	Austria	2–0	2–0	2011 World Cup qualification	
15	October 29, 2009	Amstetten, Austria	Austria	1–0	1–0	2011 World Cup qualification	
16	November 21, 2009	Manisa, Turkey	Turkey	1–0	5–0	2011 World Cup qualification	
17	November 21, 2009	Manisa, Turkey	Turkey	2–0	5–0	2011 World Cup qualification	
18	November 21, 2009	Manisa, Turkey	Turkey	3–0	5–0	2011 World Cup qualification	
19	April 7, 2010	Guadalajara, Spain	Turkey	2–0	5–1	2011 World Cup qualification	
20	April 7, 2010	Guadalajara, Spain	Turkey	5–1	5–1	2011 World Cup qualification	
21	June 19, 2010	Aranda de Duero, Spain	England	1–0	2–2	2011 World Cup qualification	
22	June 24, 2010	Segovia, Spain	Malta	1–0	9–0	2011 World Cup qualification	
23	June 24, 2010	Segovia, Spain	Malta	2–0	9–0	2011 World Cup qualification	
24	June 24, 2010	Segovia, Spain	Malta	4–0	9–0	2011 World Cup qualification	
25	June 24, 2010	Segovia, Spain	Malta	5–0	9–0	2011 World Cup qualification	
26	September 17, 2011	Istanbul, Turkey	Turkey	1–0	10–1	Euro 2013 qualifying	
27	September 17, 2011	Istanbul, Turkey	Turkey	6–1	10–1	Euro 2013 qualifying	
28	October 23, 2011	Las Rozas, Spain	Switzerland	1–0	3–2	Euro 2013 qualifying	
29	October 23, 2011	Las Rozas, Spain	Switzerland	2–0	3–2	Euro 2013 qualifying	
30	October 27, 2011	Shymkent, Kazakhstan	Kazakhstan	2–0	4–0	Euro 2013 qualifying	
31	November 20, 2011	Buftea, Romania	Romania	4–0	4–0	Euro 2013 qualifying	
32	October 20, 2012	Glasgow, Scotland	Scotland	1–1	1–1	Euro 2013 qualifying - play-off	
33	October 24, 2012	Las Rozas, Spain	Scotland	1–1	3–2	Euro 2013 qualifying - play-off	

== Honors ==
Western New York Flash

- NWSL Shield: 2013

=== Individual ===
- FIFA Women's World Cup qualification top-scorer: 2011
