= Tiffany Weimer =

American soccer forward (born 1983)

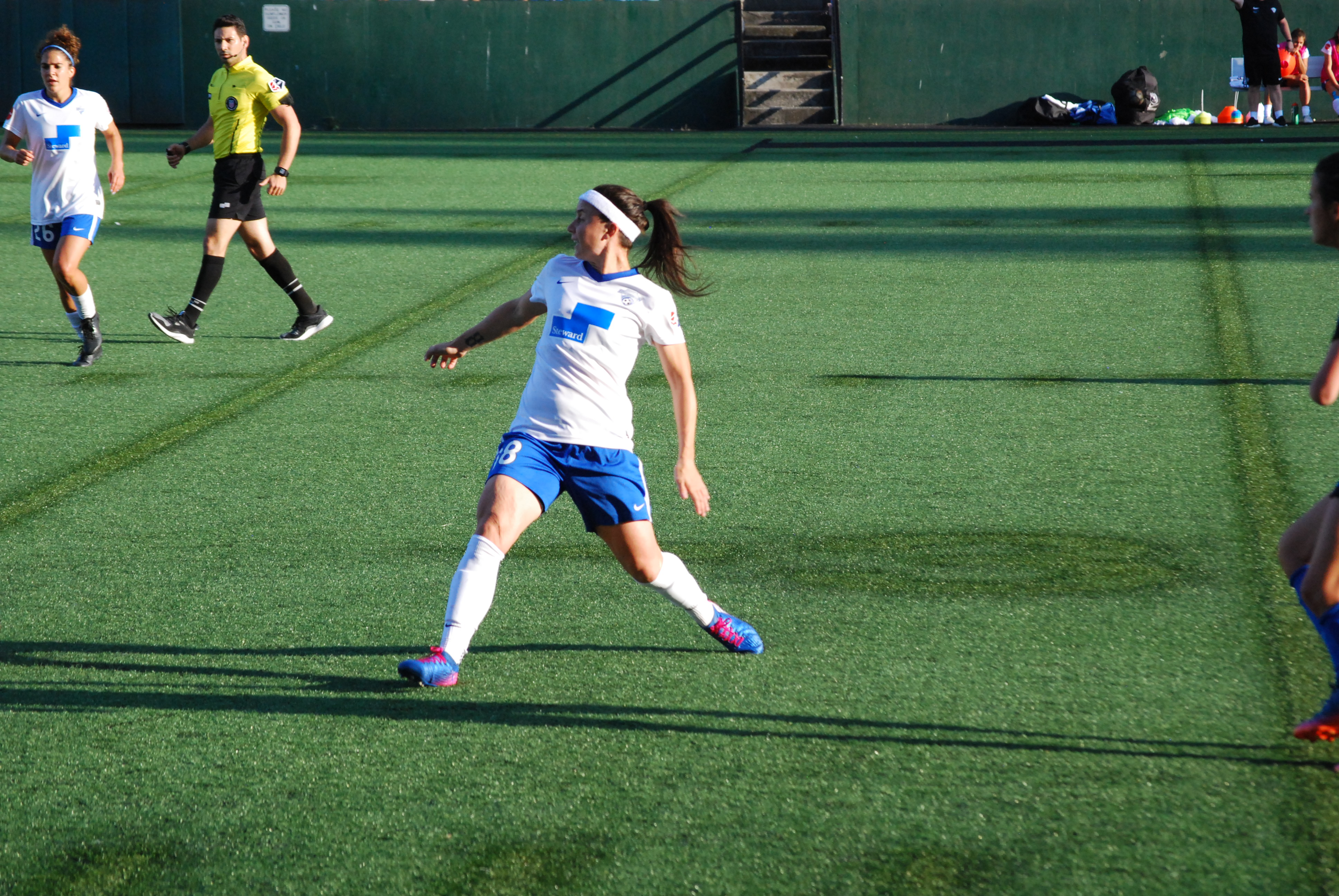
- Weimer playing for Boston Breakers in 2017

Personal information
- Full name: Tiffany Marie Weimer
- Date of birth: December 5, 1983 (age 42)
- Place of birth: Bridgeport, Connecticut, United States
- Height: 5 ft 3 in (1.60 m)
- Position: Forward

Team information
- Current team: Nordsjælland
- Number: 16

College career
Years	Team	Apps	(Gls)
2002–2005	Penn State Nittany Lions	97	(91)

Senior career*
Years	Team	Apps	(Gls)
2006	Washington Freedom		
2007–2008	SoccerPlus Connecticut	21	(24)
2008	Åland United	?	(5)
2008	Santos FC		
2009	FC Gold Pride	15	(1)
2010	Boston Breakers	8	(0)
2010	AIK	8	(4)
2011–2012	Vancouver Whitecaps	14	(7)
2012–2013	Fortuna Hjørring		
2013	Portland Thorns FC	10	(1)
2014–2015	Washington Spirit	4	(0)
2016	FC Kansas City	4	(0)
2016	Kvarnsvedens IK	10	(5)
2017	Boston Breakers	17	(0)
2018	Washington Spirit	3	(0)
2019–	Nordsjælland	0	(0)

International career
2006–2007	United States U21	6	(2)
- * Club domestic league appearances and goals as of August 10, 2018

Tiffany Marie Weimer (born December 5, 1983) is an American soccer forward who plays for FC Nordsjælland.

== Early life ==
During her high school career at North Haven High School in North Haven, Connecticut, Weimer netted 109 goals, a school record. She also garnered the NSCAA's All-American award twice, All-New England award three times, Parade All-American award twice, McDonald's All-American award once and SCC Hammonasset's All-Conference Award four times. Weimer played on South Central Premiere from 1993 to 1998, which is where her soccer career got its start. She went on to play for World Class Soccer from 1999 to 2003. The 1999 team won the National Championship and Weimer personally won the Adidas Golden Boot Award in that tournament.

=== Penn State Nittany Lions (2002–2005) ===
After graduating from North Haven High School, Weimer proceeded to attend Pennsylvania State University in University Park, Pennsylvania. Her 2002 season at Penn State yielded a Final Four appearance in the Division I NCAA Championship and were Big Ten Champions. She was honored with a spot on the Big Ten All Freshman Team, the Soccer Buzz All Freshman Team (Mid-Atlantic Region) and won the Big Ten Freshman of the Year. In 2003, the Penn State Nittany Lions appeared in the Elite 8 of the Division I NCAA Championship and were the Big Ten Champions. Weimer received a spot on the All Big Ten Team and the NSCAA's 1st Team All-American. She was also a Semi-Finalist for the MAC Hermann Trophy. The 2004 Nittany Lions were Big Ten Champions with Weimer receiving the Big Ten Offensive Player of The Year, earned a spot on the NSCAA's 1st Team All-American and Runner-Up for the MAC Hermann Trophy.

Weimer's final season at Penn State in 2005 drew an undefeated season of 23–0–2. They appeared in the Final 4 of the Division I NCAA Championship and were Big Ten Champions. Weimer received Big Ten Female Athlete of the Year, the Suzy Favor Award, Top Drawer Soccer Player of the Year, MAC Hermann Runner-Up and holds the NCAA record for most consecutive games with goals scored, 17 in total. Overall, Tiffany Weimer scored 91 goals, a Big Ten record, and 9th in the NCAA, and 32 assists. Most goals in one season: 32. Most Game-Winning Goals (season): 13.

== Playing career ==
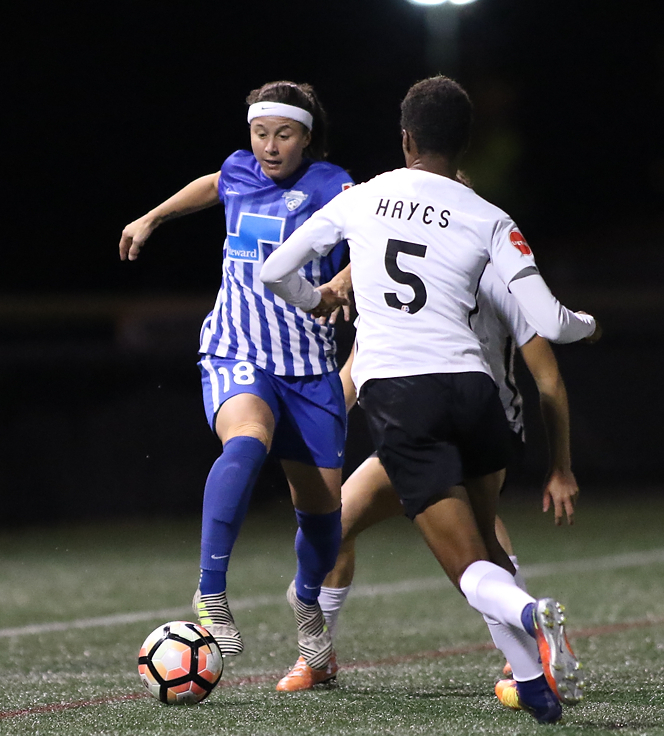
Tiffany Weimer playing for the Boston Breakers in the 2017 NWSL season

=== Club ===
In 2007, Weimer joined the SoccerPlus Connecticut Reds of the Women's Premier Soccer League. In the 2007 season, the Connecticut Reds finished third in the league. Weimer was also named WPSL East Player of the Year of 2007. Weimer contributed her expertise and degree in journalism from Pennsylvania State University and wrote a blog for that team, "Tiff's Journal."

In the summer of 2008, Weimer joined up with Finnish Naisten Liiga team Åland United. Weimer then traveled to Santos, Brazil to play for Santos FC.

On January 16, 2009, Tiffany Weimer was selected as a third round draft pick (17th overall) to play for the FC Gold Pride, a team based in the San Francisco area. In her first appearance with the club, she assisted on the first goal in club history, a cross to teammate Eriko Arakawa for a header. On August 9, 2009, FC Gold Pride wrapped up their inaugural season. Tiffany Weimer tallied a team-high three assists and also added one goal to her professional account.

On September 30, 2009, FC Gold Pride waived the 2010 rights to Weimer and on October 8, it was announced that Weimer had agreed to terms with the Boston Breakers for the 2010 season. On July 28, 2010, Weimer mutually terminated her 2010 contract with the Boston Breakers and announced her plans to travel abroad and play for AIK of Allsvenskan in Sweden.

On March 9, 2011, Vancouver Whitecaps FC, a W-League club based out of Vancouver, British Columbia, Canada announced that they had signed Weimer to play for the 2011 season. Weimer will also become Whitecaps FC Women's Ambassador.

Weimer spent two seasons playing for Fortuna Hjørring in Denmark. In 2013, she joined the Portland Thorns where she spent half of the 2013 season. Weimer was traded to the Washington Spirit for the 2014 season. Unfortunately she tore her ACL in preseason and has been working to come back for the field. She missed the 2015 season due to complications from her ACL injury.

When the Boston Breakers ceased operations prior to the 2018 season, Weimer was a part of the dispersal draft on January 30, 2018. She was picked up by her former team, Washington Spirit, in the third round.

On February 13, 2018 Weimer was traded to the Houston Dash for the fourth-round pick in the 2019 NWSL Draft. She ended up being released by the team before the season.

== Coaching ==
Weimer joined the Yale University coaching staff as a full-time member in March 2022. In the beginning of her tenure with Yale, Weimer served as an operations director and a volunteer coach for the Bulldogs.

== Personal life ==
Weimer is the Editor-In-Chief and founder of Our Game Magazine, a women's soccer quarterly magazine. She is the President and one of the co-founders of a girls soccer club called girlsCAN Football based in Connecticut.

== Honors ==
Portland Thorns FC

- NWSL Championship: 2013
