= Kat Williamson =

American soccer player

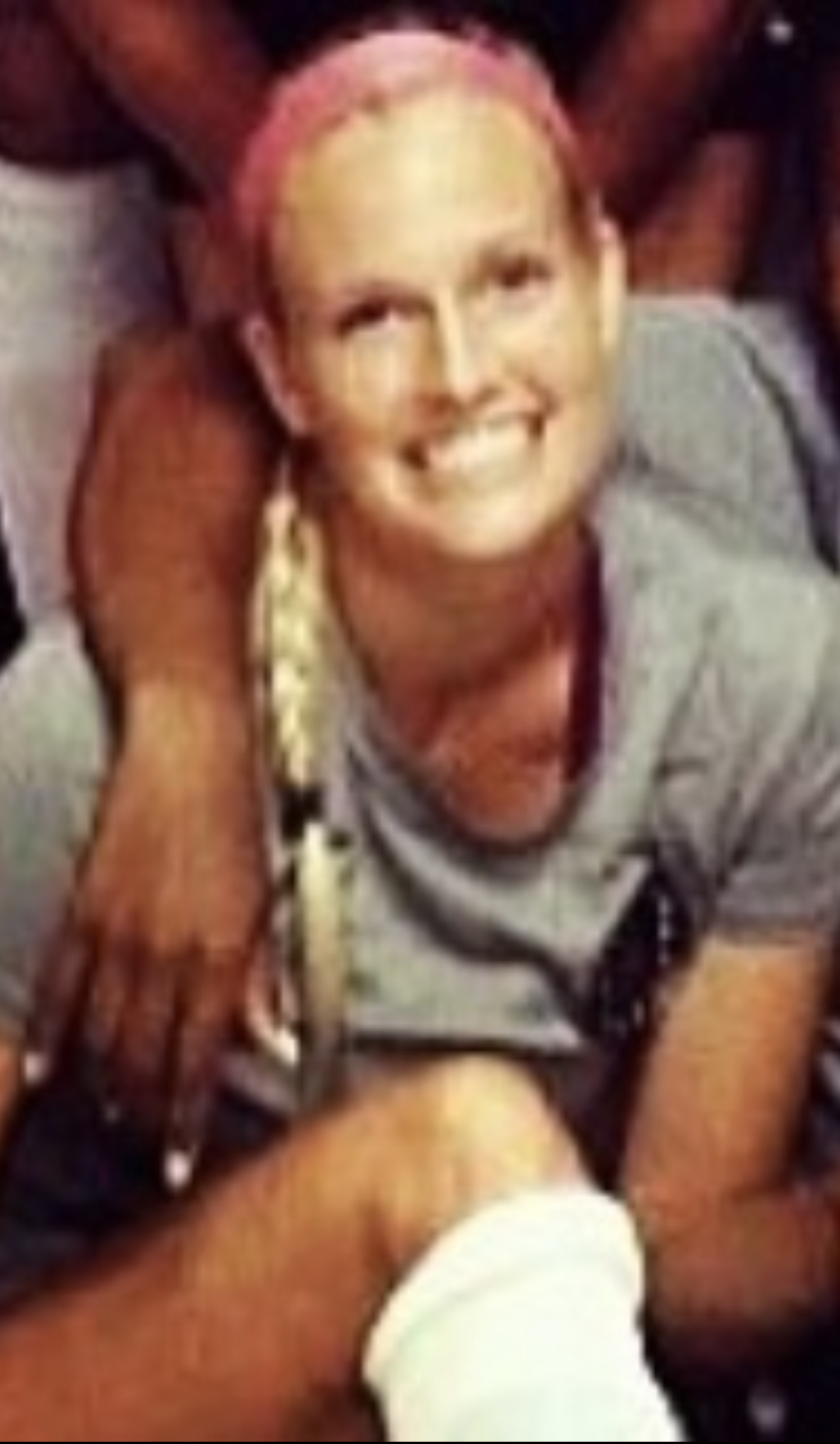

Personal information
- Full name: Kathryn Emily Williamson
- Date of birth: August 1, 1989 (age 37)
- Place of birth: McKinney, Texas
- Height: 5 ft 6 in (1.68 m)
- Position: Defender

College career
Years	Team	Apps	(Gls)
2008–2012	Florida Gators	81	

Senior career*
Years	Team	Apps	(Gls)
2012	Ottawa Fury Women	12	(0)
2013	Portland Thorns FC	22	(0)
2014	Western New York Flash	21	(0)
2015–2016	Portland Thorns FC	25	(1)

International career
2011	United States U23		
- * Club domestic league appearances and goals

Kathryn Emily Williamson (born August 1, 1989) is a former American soccer defender who played for the Portland Thorns FC of the National Women's Soccer League (NWSL).

== College career ==
Williamson was born in McKinney, Texas. She accepted an athletic scholarship to attend the University of Florida in Gainesville, Florida, where she played for coach Becky Burleigh's Florida Gators women's soccer team from 2008 to 2012. She played 81 games for the Gators between 2009 and 2012, after red-shirting her 2008 freshman season as a result of tearing two anterior cruciate ligaments (ACLs).

She received All-American and All-Southeastern Conference (SEC) honors in 2010 and 2011, was recognized as the SEC Defensive Player of the Year in 2010, and was named to the 2009 SEC All-Freshman Team.

== Professional career ==
Williamson was selected by the Portland Thorns FC in the 2013 NWSL College Draft as the 8th overall pick out of the 10 young talents the NCAA had to offer, becoming the team's first ever college draft selection. She made a strong contribution in her rookie campaign by starting all of the team's 24 matches (one of only three players to do so) and racking up 1,944 minutes of playing time (second-highest tally on the squad).

Before the start of her second season, Williamson was traded on April 5, 2014, along with Courtney Wetzel and Portland's first-round pick in the 2015 NWSL College Draft to the Western New York Flash in exchange for Sarah Huffman and a player to be named later. Two days later, the Portland Thorns revealed the player to be named later as Verónica Boquete. The pick later became Jaelene Hinkle. Williamson would appear 21 times for the Flash in 2014, playing 1,699 minutes.

Williamson was traded back to the Thorns on November 6, 2014, along with midfielder McCall Zerboni in order to acquire midfielder Amber Brooks.

== Personal ==
Williamson graduated with a bachelor's degree in psychology from the University of Florida in December 2012.

== Honors ==
Portland Thorns FC

- NWSL Championship: 2013
- NWSL Shield: 2016

Individual

- SEC Defensive Player of the Year: 2010
