= 2013 National Women's Soccer League season =

1st season of the National Women's Soccer League

National Women's Soccer League
- Season: 2013
- Champions: Portland Thorns FC
- NWSL Shield: Western New York Flash
- Matches: 88
- Goals: 238 (2.7 per match)
- Top goalscorer: Lauren Holiday (12 goals)
- Biggest home win: NJ 5–1 BOS (June 1); WNY 4–0 DC (June 28)
- Biggest away win: SEA 0–3 NJ (May 19)
- Highest scoring: 7 goals: DC 2–5 BOS (July 27); POR 4-3 KC (June 6)
- Longest winning run: 5 games Sky Blue FC (May 11 – June 1)
- Longest unbeaten run: 10 games FC Kansas City (June 23 – August 4)
- Longest losing run: 9 games Seattle Reign FC (April 16 – June 21)
- Highest attendance: 17,619 POR v FCKC (August 4)
- Lowest attendance: 688 NJ v CHI (May 8)
- Total attendance: 375,763
- Average attendance: 4,270

The 2013 National Women's Soccer League season was the inaugural season of the National Women's Soccer League, the top division of women's soccer in the United States. Including the NWSL's two professional predecessors, Women's Professional Soccer (2009–2011) and the Women's United Soccer Association (2001–2003), this was the seventh overall season of FIFA and USSF-sanctioned top division women's soccer in the United States. The league was (and is) operated by the United States Soccer Federation and received major financial backing from that body. Further financial backing was provided by the Canadian Soccer Association and the Mexican Football Federation. All three national federations paid the league salaries of many of their respective national team members in an effort to nurture talent in those nations.

The league started on April 13 with FC Kansas City hosting Portland Thorns FC. The last regular season matches were played on August 18, with the Western New York Flash topping the standings to win the NWSL Shield. This was followed by postseason playoffs, which culminated in a final on August 31. In the final, Portland Thorns FC defeated the Western New York Flash 2–0 to win the inaugural NWSL Championship.

== Teams, stadiums, and personnel ==
=== Stadiums and locations ===
| Team | Stadium | Capacity |
|---|---|---|
| Boston Breakers | Dilboy Stadium | 3,500 |
| Chicago Red Stars | Village Sports Complex | 3,600 |
| FC Kansas City | Shawnee Mission District Stadium | 6,150 |
| Portland Thorns FC | Jeld-Wen Field | 20,438 |
| Seattle Reign FC | Memorial Stadium | 6,000 |
| Sky Blue FC | Yurcak Field | 5,000 |
| Washington Spirit | Maryland SoccerPlex | 5,126 |
| Western New York Flash | Sahlen's Stadium | 13,768 |

Locations of teams for the 2013 National Women's Soccer League season.

=== Personnel and sponsorship ===
Note: All teams used Nike as kit manufacturer.

| Team | Head coach | Captain | Shirt sponsor |
|---|---|---|---|
| Boston Breakers | (United States) Lisa Cole (until August 2) | (United States) Cat Whitehill | Ocean Spray |
| Boston Breakers | (United States) Cat Whitehill (after August 2) | (United States) Cat Whitehill | Ocean Spray |
| Chicago Red Stars | (United States) Rory Dames | (United States) Lori Chalupny | JimmyBars |
| FC Kansas City | (North Macedonia) Vlatko Andonovski | (United States) Becky Sauerbrunn | Title Boxing Club |
| Portland Thorns | (United States) Cindy Parlow Cone | (Canada) Christine Sinclair | Providence Health & Services |
| Seattle Reign FC | (England) Laura Harvey | (United States) Keelin Winters | Moda Health |
| Sky Blue FC | (United States) Jim Gabarra | (United States) Christie Rampone | 2NDFLOOR Youth Helpline |
| Washington Spirit | (United States) Mike Jorden (until June 30) | (United States) Lori Lindsey | ProChain Solutions, Inc. |
| Washington Spirit | (England) Mark Parsons (after June 30) | (United States) Lori Lindsey | ProChain Solutions, Inc. |
| Western New York Flash | (New Zealand) Aaran Lines | (United States) McCall Zerboni | Sahlen's |

=== Player acquisition ===
Players were acquired through the 2013 Allocation of national team players announced on January 11, the 2013 NWSL College Draft on January 18, and the 2013 NWSL Supplemental Draft on February 7, along with free agency, trading and loans.

The Portland Thorns received an allocation with a notably strong offensive record including Alex Morgan and Christine Sinclair, the 2012 U.S. and Canadian Players of the Year and leading scorers for their national teams respectively, as well as a U.S. allocation (Morgan, Tobin Heath, and Rachel Buehler) that accounted for 1/3 of their national team's assists in 2012.

== Competition format ==
The regular season began on April 13 and ended on August 18. Each team played a total of 22 games: 11 at home and 11 away. Each team played

- three other teams (based on an east/west geographical split) four times each: twice at home and twice away
- two other teams twice each: once at home and once away
- and the remaining two teams three times each: one twice at home and once away, the other vice versa

The four teams at the end of the season with the most points qualified for the playoffs. Two semifinal games were played on August 24, with the winners advancing to the league final to be played on August 31.

=== Results table ===
Abbreviation and Color Key: Boston Breakers – BOS • Chicago Red Stars – CHI • FC Kansas City – KC • Portland Thorns FC – POR Seattle Reign FC – SEA • Sky Blue FC – NJ • Washington Spirit – WAS • Western New York Flash – WNY Win • Loss • Tie • Home Game
| Club | Match | | | | | | | | | | | | | | | | | | | | | |
| Club | 1 | 2 | 3 | 4 | 5 | 6 | 7 | 8 | 9 | 10 | 11 | 12 | 13 | 14 | 15 | 16 | 17 | 18 | 19 | 20 | 21 | 22 |
|---|---|---|---|---|---|---|---|---|---|---|---|---|---|---|---|---|---|---|---|---|---|---|
| Boston Breakers | WAS | WNY | CHI | WAS | KC | WAS | NJ | WNY | CHI | NJ | SEA | NJ | SEA | POR | NJ | POR | KC | WAS | WNY | POR | KC | WNY |
| Boston Breakers | 1–1 | 1–2 | 4–1 | 1–1 | 2–0 | 3–0 | 5–1 | 2–2 | 1–0 | 2–3 | 1–2 | 3–2 | 1–1 | 0–2 | 0–0 | 1–2 | 3–0 | 2–5 | 2–2 | 2–1 | 1–0 | 2-1 |
| Chicago Red Stars | SEA | POR | BOS | NJ | POR | WNY | POR | BOS | KC | KC | WNY | SEA | WNY | WAS | KC | WAS | SEA | POR | SEA | WAS | NJ | KC |
| Chicago Red Stars | 1–1 | 0–2 | 4-1 | 1–1 | 0–2 | 2-1 | 0–2 | 1–0 | 0–2 | 1–3 | 2–2 | 3–1 | 1–0 | 0–2 | 3–3 | 1–0 | 4–1 | 3–3 | 3–1 | 1-0 | 3–3 | 1–2 |
| FC Kansas City | POR | SEA | SEA | WNY | BOS | NJ | POR | SEA | CHI | CHI | WAS | NJ | POR | WAS | WNY | CHI | SEA | BOS | NJ | POR | BOS | CHI |
| FC Kansas City | 1–1 | 2–0 | 0–1 | 2–1 | 2–0 | 0–1 | 4–3 | 0–1 | 0–2 | 1–3 | 2–0 | 2–2 | 2–0 | 1–1 | 0–0 | 3–3 | 2–0 | 3–0 | 0–1 | 2–3 | 1-0 | 1–2 |
| Portland Thorns FC | KC | SEA | CHI | WAS | CHI | NJ | WAS | SEA | CHI | KC | SEA | NJ | KC | BOS | WNY | BOS | CHI | NJ | KC | BOS | WNY | SEA |
| Portland Thorns FC | 1–1 | 2–1 | 0–2 | 1–2 | 0–2 | 0–1 | 2–0 | 0–1 | 0–2 | 4–3 | 2–0 | 0–0 | 2–0 | 0–2 | 1–1 | 1–2 | 3–3 | 3–1 | 2–3 | 2-1 | 0–0 | 1–2 |
| Seattle Reign FC | CHI | POR | KC | KC | NJ | WAS | NJ | POR | KC | POR | WNY | BOS | CHI | BOS | WNY | WAS | KC | CHI | CHI | WNY | WAS | POR |
| Seattle Reign FC | 1–1 | 2–1 | 2–0 | 0–1 | 2–0 | 2–4 | 0–3 | 0–1 | 0–1 | 2–0 | 1–1 | 1–2 | 3–1 | 1–1 | 3–2 | 2–1 | 2–0 | 4–1 | 3–1 | 1-0 | 1-0 | 1–2 |
| Sky Blue FC | WNY | WAS | WNY | CHI | SEA | POR | SEA | KC | BOS | WNY | BOS | POR | KC | BOS | WAS | BOS | WNY | KC | POR | WAS | CHI | WAS |
| Sky Blue FC | 1–0 | 1–2 | 2–1 | 1–1 | 2–0 | 0–1 | 0–3 | 0–1 | 5–1 | 0–3 | 2–3 | 0–0 | 2–2 | 3–2 | 1–0 | 0–0 | 3–0 | 0–1 | 3–1 | 1–0 | 3–3 | 1–1 |
| Washington Spirit | BOS | WNY | NJ | POR | BOS | SEA | POR | BOS | WNY | KC | WNY | KC | NJ | CHI | SEA | CHI | BOS | WNY | NJ | CHI | SEA | NJ |
| Washington Spirit | 1–1 | 1–1 | 1–2 | 1–2 | 1–1 | 2–4 | 2–0 | 3–0 | 0–2 | 2–0 | 4–0 | 1–1 | 1–0 | 0–2 | 2–1 | 1–0 | 2–5 | 3–0 | 1–0 | 1–0 | 1–0 | 1–1 |
| Western New York Flash | NJ | WAS | BOS | NJ | KC | CHI | BOS | NJ | WAS | CHI | SEA | WAS | CHI | KC | SEA | POR | NJ | WAS | BOS | SEA | POR | BOS |
| Western New York Flash | 1–0 | 1–1 | 1–2 | 2–1 | 2–1 | 2–1 | 2–2 | 0–3 | 0–2 | 2–2 | 1–1 | 4–0 | 1–0 | 0–0 | 3–2 | 1–1 | 3–0 | 3–0 | 2–2 | 1–0 | 0–0 | 2–1 |

Scores listed as home-away

== League standings ==
| Pos | Team | Pld | W | D | L | GF | GA | GD | Pts | Qualification |
|---|---|---|---|---|---|---|---|---|---|---|
| 1 | Western New York Flash | 22 | 10 | 8 | 4 | 36 | 20 | +16 | 38 | NWSL Shield |
| 2 | FC Kansas City | 22 | 11 | 5 | 6 | 34 | 22 | +12 | 38 | NWSL Playoffs |
| 3 | Portland Thorns FC (C) | 22 | 11 | 5 | 6 | 32 | 25 | +7 | 38 | NWSL Playoffs |
| 4 | Sky Blue FC | 22 | 10 | 6 | 6 | 31 | 26 | +5 | 36 | NWSL Playoffs |
| 5 | Boston Breakers | 22 | 8 | 6 | 8 | 35 | 34 | +1 | 30 | |
| 6 | Chicago Red Stars | 22 | 8 | 6 | 8 | 32 | 36 | −4 | 30 | |
| 7 | Seattle Reign FC | 22 | 5 | 3 | 14 | 22 | 36 | −14 | 18 | |
| 8 | Washington Spirit | 22 | 3 | 5 | 14 | 16 | 39 | −23 | 14 | |

Source: soccerway.com
Rules for classification: Tiebreakers
(C) Champions

== NWSL Championship ==
The top four teams from the regular season qualified for the championship playoffs. In the semifinals, the regular season winner hosted the fourth-placed team and the regular season runner-up hosted the third-placed team. The highest-seeded semifinal winner then hosted the championship final. All match-ups were one-game series (as opposed to home-and-away series).

Semi-Finals
1 | Western New York Flash | 2
4 | Sky Blue FC | 0
2 | FC Kansas City | 2
3 | Portland Thorns FC (AET) | 3

Championship
1 | Western New York Flash | 0
3 | Portland Thorns FC | 2

=== Semi-finals ===
August 24, 2013
1:00 pm CDT

| FC Kansas City | 2–3 (a.e.t.) | Portland Thorns FC |
|---|---|---|
| Tymrak 12'; Henderson 25'; Scott (yellow card) 73'; Buczkowski (yellow card) 86' | Report; Report | Heath 33'; Dougherty (yellow card) 50'; Long (yellow card) 61' (goal) 103'; Weimer 65' |

Shawnee Mission District Stadium, Overland Park, Kansas
Attendance: 4,016
Referee: Christina Unkel
August 24, 2013
8:00 pm EDT

| Western New York Flash | 2–0 | Sky Blue FC |
|---|---|---|
| Lloyd 33', 90+' (yellow card) 42'; Huffman (yellow card) 90+' | Report; Report | Makoski (yellow card) 51'; Adams (yellow card) 90' |

Sahlen's Stadium, Rochester, New York
Attendance: 7,316
Referee: Katja Koroleva

=== Championship ===
Main article: 2013 NWSL Championship

August 31, 2013
8:00 pm EDT

| Western New York Flash | 0–2 | Portland Thorns FC |
|---|---|---|
| Johnson (yellow card) 33'; Martin (yellow card) 74' | Report; Report | Heath 40'; Williamson (yellow card) 49' (red card) 57'; Long (yellow card) 89'; Ellertson (yellow card) 90'; Sinclair 90+' |

Sahlen's Stadium, Rochester, New York
Attendance: 9,129
Referee: Kari Seitz

== Attendance ==
=== Average home attendances ===
| Team | Average Attendance |
|---|---|
| Boston Breakers | 2,427 |
| Chicago Red Stars | 1,713 |
| FC Kansas City | 4,626 |
| Portland Thorns FC | 13,320 |
| Seattle Reign FC | 2,306 |
| Sky Blue FC | 1,677 |
| Washington Spirit | 3,626 |
| Western New York Flash | 4,485 |

Highest Attendance: 17,619 (August 4, Kansas City at Portland)

Lowest Attendance: 688 (May 8, Chicago at Sky Blue)

Total Attendance: 375,846 (88 games total)

League Average: 4,271

=== Playoff attendance ===
Semifinal 1, Portland at FC Kansas City: 4,016

Semifinal 2, Sky Blue at Western New York: 7,316

Championship, Portland at Western New York: 9,129

== Statistical leaders ==
=== Top scorers ===
| Rank | Player | Nation | Club | Goals |
|---|---|---|---|---|
| 1 | Lauren Holiday | USA | FC Kansas City | 12 |
| 2 | Sydney Leroux | USA | Boston Breakers | 11 |
| 2 | Abby Wambach | USA | Western New York Flash | 11 |
| 4 | Carli Lloyd | USA | Western New York Flash | 8 |
| 4 | Diana Matheson | CAN | Washington Spirit | 8 |
| 4 | Alex Morgan | USA | Portland Thorns FC | 8 |
| 4 | Mónica Ocampo | MEX | Sky Blue FC | 8 |
| 4 | Christine Sinclair | CAN | Portland Thorns FC | 8 |
| 9 | Sophie Schmidt | CAN | Sky Blue FC | 7 |
| 10 | Erika Tymrak | USA | FC Kansas City | 6 |

=== Top assists ===
| Rank | Player | Nation | Club | Assists |
|---|---|---|---|---|
| 1 | Lauren Holiday | USA | FC Kansas City | 9 |
| 2 | Abby Wambach | USA | Western New York Flash | 8 |
| 3 | Lianne Sanderson | ENG | Boston Breakers | 7 |
| 4 | Katy Freels | USA | Sky Blue FC | 6 |
| 4 | Heather O'Reilly | USA | Boston Breakers | 6 |
| 6 | Leigh Ann Robinson | USA | FC Kansas City | 5 |
| 6 | Christine Nairn | USA | Seattle Reign FC | 5 |
| 6 | Alex Morgan | USA | Portland Thorns | 5 |
| 6 | Samantha Kerr | AUS | Western New York Flash | 5 |
| 10 | Lori Chalupny | USA | Chicago Red Stars | 4 |
| 10 | Julianne Sitch | USA | Chicago Red Stars | 4 |
| 10 | Erika Tymrak | USA | FC Kansas City | 4 |

=== Goalkeeping ===
(Minimum of 540 Minutes Played)

| Rank | Goalkeeper | Club | GP | MINS | SOG | SVS | GA | GAA | W-L-T | SHO |
|---|---|---|---|---|---|---|---|---|---|---|
| 1 | (United States) Adrianna Franch | Western New York Flash | 22 | 1978 | 119 | 98 | 20 | 0.909 | 10–4–8 | 7 |
| 2 | (United States) Brittany Cameron | Sky Blue FC | 18 | 1619 | 83 | 65 | 17 | 0.945 | 9–4–5 | 8 |
| 3 | (United States) Nicole Barnhart | FC Kansas City | 20 | 1800 | 86 | 67 | 19 | 0.950 | 10–5–5 | 10 |
| 4 | (Canada) Karina LeBlanc | Portland Thorns FC | 21 | 1890 | 114 | 92 | 23 | 1.095 | 11–5–5 | 7 |
| 5 | (United States) Alyssa Naeher | Boston Breakers | 9 | 765 | 47 | 36 | 11 | 1.222 | 4–2–2 | 2 |
| 6 | (United States) Taylor Vancil | Chicago Red Stars | 6 | 540 | 31 | 23 | 8 | 1.334 | 3–2–1 | 1 |
| 7 | (United States) Hope Solo | Seattle Reign FC | 14 | 1260 | 101 | 81 | 19 | 1.357 | 5–6–2 | 0 |
| 8 | (Canada) Erin McLeod | Chicago Red Stars | 16 | 1430 | 92 | 64 | 28 | 1.750 | 5–6–5 | 4 |
| 9 | (United States) Ashley Phillips | Boston Breakers | 11 | 945 | 51 | 32 | 20 | 1.818 | 2–5–4 | 1 |
| 10 | (United States) Ashlyn Harris | Washington Spirit | 18 | 1620 | 118 | 85 | 33 | 1.882 | 2–11–4 | 1 |
| 11 | (United States) Michelle Betos | Seattle Reign FC | 7 | 630 | 49 | 34 | 14 | 2.000 | 0–6–1 | 0 |

== Individual awards ==
=== Monthly awards ===
| Month | Player of the Month | | Club | Month's Statline |
|---|---|---|---|---|
| April | (Canada) | Christine Sinclair | Portland Thorns FC | 2 G, 1 A in 3 games; Thorns 2–0–1 in April |
| May | (United States) | Brittany Cameron | Sky Blue FC | 0.5 GAA, 4SHO in 6 games; SBFC 4–1–1 in May |
| June | (United States) | Lauren Cheney | FC Kansas City | 6 G, 1 A in 5 games; FCKC 4–2–1 in June |
| July | (United States) | Erika Tymrak | FC Kansas City | 3 G, 1 A in 6 games; FCKC 3–0–3 in July |
| August | (Mexico) | Mónica Ocampo | Sky Blue FC | 3 G, in 3 games |

=== Weekly awards ===
| Week | Player of the Week | | Club | Week's Statline |
|---|---|---|---|---|
| Week 1 | (United States) | Brittany Cameron | Sky Blue FC | 5 SVS, SHO |
| Week 2 | (Wales) | Jessica Fishlock | Seattle Reign FC | 1 G (74') |
| Week 3 | (United States) | Heather O'Reilly | Boston Breakers | 2 G (16', 83'), GWG |
| Week 4 | (United States) | Sydney Leroux | Boston Breakers | 3 G (26', 74', 84'), GWG |
| Week 5 | (United States) | Abby Wambach | Western New York Flash | 2 G (34', 39'), GWG |
| Week 6 | (United States) | Christie Rampone | Sky Blue FC | 180min, 0 GA |
| Week 7 | (England) | Lianne Sanderson | Boston Breakers | 3 A |
| Week 8 | (Australia) | Lisa De Vanna | Sky Blue FC | 2 G (14', 56'), 1 A |
| Week 9 | (United States) | Abby Wambach | Western New York Flash | 1 G (82'), 1 A |
| Week 10 | (United States) | Lori Chalupny | Chicago Red Stars | 1 A |
| Week 11 | (Canada) | Karina LeBlanc | Portland Thorns FC | 7 SVS |
| Week 12 | (United States) | Carli Lloyd | Western New York Flash | 3 G (3', 22', 56') |
| Week 13 | (United States) | Sydney Leroux | Boston Breakers | 3 G, 2 Games |
| Week 14 | (Canada) | Karina LeBlanc | Portland Thorns FC | 5 SVS |
| Week 15 | (United States) | Erika Tymrak | FC Kansas City | 1 G (86'), 1 A |
| Week 16 | (United States) | Megan Rapinoe | Seattle Reign FC | 2 G (6', 68'), 1 A |
| Week 17 | (United States) | Lauren Holiday | FC Kansas City | 2 G (23', 55') |
| Week 18 | (Canada) | Diana Matheson | Washington Spirit | 1 G, 1 A in 2 Games |
| Week 19 | (United States) | Jen Hoy | Chicago Red Stars | 2 G (45', 92') |

=== Annual awards ===
| Award | Winner | | | Runner-up | | Third place | |
|---|---|---|---|---|---|---|---|
| Golden Boot | (United States) Lauren Holiday | FC Kansas City | 12 Goals | (United States) Abby Wambach | Western New York Flash | (United States) Sydney Leroux | Boston Breakers |
| Rookie of the Year | (United States) Erika Tymrak | FC Kansas City | 6 Goals, 4 Assists | (United States) Adrianna Franch | Western New York Flash | (United States) Sydney Leroux | Boston Breakers |
| Goalkeeper of the Year | (United States) Nicole Barnhart | FC Kansas City | 10 Shutouts | (United States) Adrianna Franch | Western New York Flash | (Canada) Karina LeBlanc | Portland Thorns |
| Defender of the Year | (United States) Becky Sauerbrunn | FC Kansas City | 1710min, 1.00 GAA | (United States) Christie Rampone | Sky Blue FC | (United States) Leigh Ann Robinson | FC Kansas City |
| Coach of the Year | (North Macedonia) Vlatko Andonovski | FC Kansas City | 11–6–5, 2nd reg. season | (United States) Jim Gabarra | Sky Blue FC | (New Zealand) Aaran Lines | Western New York Flash |
| Most Valuable Player | (United States) Lauren Holiday | FC Kansas City | 1st in G and A, 4th in S and SOG | (United States) Abby Wambach | Western New York Flash | (United States) Lori Chalupny | Chicago Red Stars |

NWSL Best XI
| Position | First team | | | Second team | | |
|---|---|---|---|---|---|---|
| Goalkeeper | (United States) Nicole Barnhart | FC Kansas City | 10 shutouts | (United States) Adrianna Franch | Western New York Flash | 98 Saves |
| Defense | (United States) Christie Rampone | Sky Blue FC | 1.20 GAA | (United States) Rachel Buehler | Portland Thorns FC | 1.15 GAA |
| Defense | (United States) Leigh Ann Robinson | FC Kansas City | 5 assists | (Australia) Caitlin Foord | Sky Blue FC | NWSL youngest player |
| Defense | (United States) Becky Sauerbrunn | FC Kansas City | 1.0 GAA | (United States) Ali Krieger | Washington Spirit | 1 goal |
| Defense | (United States) Brittany Taylor | Western New York Flash | 3 goals, 4 assists | (Canada) Lauren Sesselmann | FC Kansas City | 0.84 GAA |
| Midfield | (United States) Lori Chalupny | Chicago Red Stars | 5 goals, 4 assists | (United States) Megan Rapinoe | Seattle Reign FC | 5 goals, 1 assist |
| Midfield | (Wales) Jess Fishlock | Seattle Reign FC | 4 goals | (Canada) Desiree Scott | FC Kansas City | 1.00 GAA |
| Midfield | (United States) Lauren Holiday | FC Kansas City | 12 goals, 9 assists | (United States) Erika Tymrak | FC Kansas City | 6 goals, 4 assists |
| MF // FW | (Canada) Diana Matheson | Washington Spirit | 8 goals, 3 assists | (United States) Alex Morgan | Portland Thorns FC | 8 goals, 5 assists |
| Forward | (United States) Sydney Leroux | Boston Breakers | 11 goals, 2 assists | (England) Lianne Sanderson | Boston Breakers | 5 goals, 7 assists |
| Forward | (United States) Abby Wambach | Western New York Flash | 11 goals, 8 assists | (Canada) Christine Sinclair | Portland Thorns FC | 8 goals, 2 assists |

NWSL Championship Game MVP
| Player | Club | Record |
|---|---|---|
| (United States) Tobin Heath | Portland Thorns FC | Scored game-winning goal in first league Championship Game |

== Statistics ==
=== Scoring ===
- First goal of the season: Renae Cuellar for FC Kansas City against Portland Thorns FC, 3rd minute (April 13)
- Earliest goal in a match: 2 minutes
  - CoCo Goodson for Sky Blue FC against Washington Spirit (April 27)
- Latest goal in a match: 90+6 minutes
  - Lori Chalupny for Chicago Red Stars against FC Kansas City (July 14)
- Widest winning margin: 4 goals
  - Sky Blue 5–1 Boston Breakers (June 1)
  - Western New York Flash 4–0 Washington Spirit (May 4)
- Most goals scored in a match: 7
  - Washington Spirit 2–5 Boston Breakers (July 27)
  - Portland Thorns 4-3 FC Kansas City (June 6)
- First Own Goal: McCall Zerboni of Western New York Flash for Sky Blue FC (April 14)
- Average goals per match: 2.705

==== Hat-tricks ====
| Player | For | Against | Result | Date |
|---|---|---|---|---|
| (United States) Sydney Leroux | Boston Breakers | Chicago Red Stars | 4–1 | May 4, 2013 |
| (United States) Carli Lloyd | Western New York Flash | Washington Spirit | 4–0 | June 28, 2013 |

=== Discipline ===
- First yellow card: Kristie Mewis for FC Kansas City against Portland Thorns FC, 43rd minute (April 13)
- Most yellow cards in a match: 6
  - Portland Thorns FC 2–1 Seattle Reign FC – 3 for Portland (Allie Long, Angie Kerr, & Nikki Washington) and 3 for Seattle (Elli Reed, Christine Nairn, & Jessica Fishlock) (April 21)

=== Streaks ===
- Longest winning streak: 5 games
  - Sky Blue FC, games 5–9
- Longest unbeaten streak: 10 games
  - FC Kansas City, games 11–20
- Longest winless streak: 13 games
  - Washington Spirit, games 7–19
- Longest losing streak: 9 games
  - Seattle Reign FC, games 2–10
- Longest shutout: 435 minutes by Brittany Cameron for Sky Blue FC
- Longest drought: 541 minutes for Washington Spirit

=== Other firsts ===
- First player to score twice in a match: Heather O'Reilly for Boston Breakers against Western New York Flash (April 27)
- First come-from-behind victory: Boston Breakers 2–1 Western New York Flash (April 27)

=== Home team record ===
(Regular season only)

- 8 wins, 8 losses, 6 ties – 1.364 PPG
- 28 goals for, 26 goals against – +2 GD

== See also ==
- 2013 NWSL Championship
- List of top-division football clubs in CONCACAF countries
- List of professional sports teams in the United States and Canada
