= List of Washington Spirit players =

Washington Spirit is an American soccer club founded in 2012, after the team ownership was awarded a National Women's Soccer League (NWSL) franchise. Washington Spirit began playing competitive soccer in the 2013 season. The team has played its home games at Maryland SoccerPlex in Boyds, Maryland, and Audi Field in Washington, D.C.

== Statistics ==
All rostered players during NWSL season are included even if they did not make an appearance. Amateur call-ups are only included if they made an appearance. All statistics have been referenced from Soccerway.com and listings from NWSLsoccer.com.

=== League statistics ===
==== Field players ====
All statistics include only NWSL regular season matches, and are correct as of September 15, 2019.

Name	Pos.	Country	Acquired From	Tenure	Apps.	Mins.	G	A
Alex Singer	DF	USA	(Germany) Turbine Potsdam	2014–2015	16	1,246	0	0
Alexa Newfield	MF	USA	(United States) Utah Royals FC	2018–	1	20	0	0
Ali Krieger	DF	USA	(Germany) 1. FFC Frankfurt	2013–2016	63	5,282	3	0
Alyssa Kleiner	DF	USA	(United States) Portland Thorns FC	2016–2018	35	2,099	1	1
Amanda DaCosta	MF	POR	(England) Liverpool L.F.C.	2015	17	647	3	0
Amy Harrison	DF	AUS	(Australia) Sydney FC	2019–	10	508	0	2
Andi Sullivan	MF	USA	(United States) Stanford Cardinal	2018–	42	3,694	2	1
Angela Salem	DF	USA	(United States) Western New York Flash	2015	17	983	0	0
Arianna Romero	DF	MEX	(United States) Houston Dash	2015	0	0	0	0
Arielle Ship	FW	USA	(United States) UC Berkeley Golden Bears	2017–	21	976	2	3
Ashley Hatch	FW	USA	(United States) North Carolina Courage	2018–	41	3,581	10	3
Bayley Feist	MF/FW	USA	(United States) Wake Forest Demon Deacons	2019–	8	249	1	1
Bianca Sierra	MF	MEX	(United States) University of Auburn	2014	8	510	0	0
Cali Farquharson	FW	USA	(United States) Arizona State University	2016–	42	1456	0	2
Cameron Castleberry	MF	USA	(United States) University of North Carolina	2017–	2	26	0	0
Candace Chapman	DF	CAN	(United States) Western New York Flash	2013	8	550	0	0
Caprice Dydasco	DF	USA	(United States) Pali Blues	2015–2019	58	4342	0	2
Carlin Hudson	DF	USA	(United States) North Carolina Courage	2019–	4	50	0	0
Caroline Miller	FW	USA	(United States) Virginia Cavaliers	2013–2015	9	198	0	0
Cecilie Sandvej	DF	DEN	(Australia) Perth Glory	2014	0	0	0	0
Cheyna Matthews	FW	JAM	(United States) Florida State Seminoles	2016–	52	2778	11	3
Chloe Logarzo	MF	AUS	(Australia) Sydney FC	2019–	11	550	1	0
Christine Nairn	MF	USA	(United States) Seattle Reign FC	2014–2016	53	5154	15	3
Colleen Williams	FW	USA	(United States) Dayton Flyers	2013	6	127	0	0
Conny Pohlers	FW	GER	(Germany) VfL Wolfsburg	2013	13	978	1	0
Crystal Dunn	FW	USA	(United States) University of North Carolina	2014–2016	54	4338	17	8
Crystal Thomas	FW	USA	(United States) Georgetown University	2017, 2019–	10	398	2	0
Danesha Adams	FW	USA	(United States) Houston Dash	2014	13	801	1	0
Diana Matheson	MF	CAN	(Norway) LSK Kvinner	2013–2016	63	5112	23	9
Domenica Hodak	DF	USA	(United States) University of Maryland	2013	11	627	0	0
Dorian Bailey	MF	USA	(United States) North Carolina Tar Heels	2019–	16	953	1	0
Elise Kellond-Knight	MF	AUS	(United States) Reign FC	2019–	9	450	0	0
Estefania Banini	FW	ARG	(Chile) Colo-Colo	2015–2016, 2017–2019	38	2632	7	1
Estelle Johnson	DF	CMR	(United States) Western New York Flash	2015–2019	71	6246	2	1
Francisca Ordega	FW	NGR	(Sweden) Piteå IF	2015–2019	58	3742	12	1
Guadalupe Worbis	FW	MEX	(United States) NWSL Player Allocation	2013	11	411	1	1
Havana Solaun	FW	JAM	(United States) Seattle Reign FC	2017–2019	37	2225	5	5
Hayley Raso	FW	AUS	(Australia) Brisbane Roar	2015	8	183	0	0
Holly King	MF	USA	(United States) Florida University	2013	11	644	0	0
Ingrid Wells	MF	USA	(Sweden) Göteborg FC	2013	8	549	0	0
Jasmyne Spencer	FW	USA	(Denmark) Brøndby IF	2013	17	645	0	1
Jennifer Skogerboe	DF	USA	(United States) University of Connecticut	2014–2015	2	30	0	0
Joanna Lohman	MF	USA	(United States) Boston Breakers	2015–2019	51	3205	6	1
Jodie Taylor	FW	ENG	(Australia) Sydney FC	2014	21	1726	11	2
Jordan Angeli	DF	USA	(United States) Boston Breakers	2014	10	238	0	0
Jordan Baggett	MF	USA	(United States) Stanford Cardinal	2019–	19	1,564	4	0
Josephine Chukwunonye	DF	NGR	(Nigeria) Rivers Angels F.C.	2015	2	56	0	0
Julia Roberts	MF	USA	(United States) Seattle Sounders Women	2013–2015	20	1627	0	0
Kassey Kallman	DF	USA	(United States) Boston Breakers	2017–2018	17	1400	0	0
Katherine Reynolds	DF	USA	(United States) Western New York Flash	2015	19	1701	0	0
Katie Stengel	FW	USA	(Germany) FC Bayern Munich	2016–	24	1141	4	1
Kelsey Pardue	MF	USA	(United States) Longwood University	2014	1	9	0	0
Kerstin Garefrekes	FW	GER	(Germany) 1. FFC Frankfurt	2014	10	594	1	0
Kika Toulouse	DF	USA	(Sweden) Rågsveds IF	2013	16	900	0	0
Kristie Mewis	MF	USA	(United States) Boston Breakers	2017–	14	898	2	0
Laura del Rio	FW	ESP	(England) Bristol City W.F.C.	2015	11	699	0	0
Lindsay Agnew	FW	CAN	(United States) Ohio State University	2017–2018	8	290	0	1
Lindsay Taylor	FW	USA	(United States) Seattle Reign FC	2013	6	231	0	0
Line Jensen	DF	DEN	(Denmark) Fortuna Hjørring	2016–2018	12	710	1	1
Lisa De Vanna	FW	AUS	(United States) Boston Breakers	2014	11	789	1	4
Lori Lindsey	MF	USA	(United States) Western New York Flash	2013–2014	43	3385	2	3
Mallory Eubanks	FW	USA	(United States) Mississippi State Bulldogs	2018	12	516	0	0
Mallory Swanson	FW	USA	(United States) UCLA	2017–	36	2735	8	4
Marisa Abegg	DF	USA	(United States) Gulf Coast Texans	2013	5	420	0	0
McKenzie Berryhill	DF	USA	(Norway) Klepp IL	2019–	3	196	0	0
Megan Crosson	DF	USA	(Spain) UD Granadilla Tenerife	2018–	9	441	1	0
Megan Montefusco	DF	USA	(United States) Chicago Red Stars	2015–2016	35	3141	1	1
Megan Dougherty Howard	MF	USA	(United States) University of Florida	2017–	64	4732	1	1
Morgan Proffitt	MF	USA	(United States) Chicago Red Stars	2017–2018	7	452	0	0
Ngozi Okobi	MF	NGR	(United States) Chicago Red Stars	2015	4	68	0	0
Niki Cross	DF	USA	(Germany) FC Bayern Munich	2014	10	740	0	0
Paige Nielsen	FW/DF	USA	(Australia) Canberra United FC	2019–	17	1,464	0	0
Quinn (Note: Known as Rebecca Quinn while playing for the Washington Spirit)	MF	CAN	(United States) Duke Blue Devils	2018–2019	17	1,384	0	0
Renae Cuellar	FW	MEX	(United States) FC Kansas City	2014	10	407	0	0
Robyn Gayle	DF	CAN	(Canada) Vancouver Whitecaps	2013–2014	30	2342	2	4
Rose Lavelle	MF	USA	(United States) Boston Breakers	2018–	15	739	0	1
Sam Staab	DF	USA	(United States) Clemson Tigers	2019–	19	1,710	1	0
Shelina Zadorsky	DF	CAN	(Sweden) Vittsjö GIK	2016–2018	32	2705	0	2
Stephanie Ochs	MF	USA	(United States) San Diego Toreros	2013	22	1852	1	2
Taylor Smith	DF	USA	(United States) North Carolina Courage	2018–2019	23	2,064	0	1
Tegan McGrady	DF/FW	USA	(United States) Stanford Cardinal	2019–	4	329	0	0
Tiffany McCarty	FW	USA	(United States) Florida State Seminoles	2013, 2018–	22	1312	2	0
Tiffany Weimer	FW	USA	(United States) Portland Thorns FC	2014–2015, 2018–2019	7	120	0	0
Toni Pressley	DF	USA	(Russia) Ryazan VDV	2013–2014	17	1060	0	0
Tori Huster	MF	USA	(Australia) Newcastle Jets	2013–	133	11193	3	5
Veronica Perez	MF	MEX	(United States) Western New York Flash	2014–2015	16	647	1	1
Whitney Church	DF	USA	(United States) Penn State University	2015–2019	71	5826	1	2
Yael Averbuch	MF	USA	(Sweden) Göteborg FC	2014	22	1562	1	1
Zoe Clark	DF	USA	(United States) Maryland Terrapins	2018–	1	90	0	0

==== Goalkeepers ====
All statistics include only NWSL regular season matches, and are correct as of September 15, 2019.

Name	Country	Acquired From	Tenure	Apps.	Mins.	W	L	D	GA	GAA	SO
Ashlyn Harris	USA	(Germany) FCR 2001 Duisburg	2013–2015	46	4,140	15	18	13	76	4.80	6
Aubrey Kingsbury	USA	(United States) Orlando Pride	2018–	40	3,600	2	12	6	32	1.43	4
Chantel Jones	USA	(Iceland) Þór Akureyri	2013–2014	9	800	1	7	1	18	3.90	1
DiDi Haračić	BIH	(United States) Washington Spirit Reserves	2016–2019	9	810	1	7	1	20	2.57	0
Kelsey Wys	USA	(United States) Western New York Flash	2015–2019	24	2,160	12	8	4	32	2.62	5
Stephanie Labbé	CAN	(Sweden) KIF Örebro DFF	2016–	25	2,250	9	12	4	37	2.64	7

=== NWSL playoffs ===
==== Field players ====
All statistics include only NWSL playoff matches, and are correct as of October 10, 2020.

Name	Pos.	Country	Acquired From	Tenure	Apps.	Mins.	G	A
Alex Singer	DF	USA	(Germany) Turbine Potsdam	2014–2015	1	90	0	0
Ali Krieger	DF	USA	(Germany) 1. FFC Frankfurt	2013–2016	3	330	1	1
Alyssa Kleiner	DF	USA	(United States) Portland Thorns FC	2016–2017	1	108	0	0
Amanda DaCosta	MF	POR	(England) Liverpool L.F.C.	2015	1	44	0	0
Angela Salem	DF	USA	(United States) Western New York Flash	2015	1	84	0	0
Caprice Dydasco	DF	USA	(United States) Pali Blues	2015–2018	2	142	0	0
Christine Nairn	MF	USA	(United States) Seattle Reign FC	2014–2016	4	420	0	1
Crystal Dunn	FW	USA	(United States) University of North Carolina	2014–2016	4	420	2	0
Diana Matheson	MF	CAN	(Norway) LSK Kvinner	2013–2016	4	272	0	0
Estefanía Banini	FW	ARG	(Chile) Colo-Colo	2015–2018	2	167	0	0
Estelle Johnson	DF	CMR	(United States) Western New York Flash	2015–2018	1	90	0	0
Francisca Ordega	FW	NGR	(Sweden) Piteå IF	2015–2018	3	299	1	0
Hayley Raso	FW	AUS	(Australia) Brisbane Roar	2015	1	46	0	0
Joanna Lohman	MF	USA	(United States) Boston Breakers	2015–2018	2	87	0	0
Jodie Taylor	FW	ENG	(Australia) Sydney FC	2014	1	90	0	0
Katie Stengel	FW	USA	(Germany) FC Bayern Munich	2016–2017	2	49	0	0
Kerstin Garefrekes	FW	GER	(Germany) 1. FFC Frankfurt	2014	1	89	0	0
Megan Oyster	DF	USA	(United States) Chicago Red Stars	2015–2016	3	216	0	1
Robyn Gayle	DF	CAN	(Canada) Vancouver Whitecaps	2013–2014	1	1	0	0
Shelina Zadorsky	DF	CAN	(Sweden) Vittsjö GIK	2016–2017	2	240	0	1
Toni Pressley	DF	USA	(Russia) Ryazan VDV	2013–2014	1	90	0	0
Tori Huster	MF	USA	(Australia) Newcastle Jets	2013–	4	336	0	0
Veronica Perez	MF	MEX	(United States) Western New York Flash	2014–2015	1	38	1	0
Whitney Church	DF	USA	(United States) Penn State University	2015–2018	3	330	0	0
Yael Averbuch	MF	USA	(Sweden) Göteborg FC	2014	1	62	0	0

==== Goalkeepers ====
All statistics include only NWSL playoff matches, and are correct as of October 10, 2020.

Name	Country	Acquired From	Tenure	Apps.	Mins.	W	L	D	GA	GAA	SO
Ashlyn Harris	USA	(Germany) FCR 2001 Duisburg	2013–2015	2	180	0	2	0	5	2.50	0
Kelsey Wys	USA	(United States) Western New York Flash	2015–	2	240	1	0	1	3	1.50	0

=== Cup statistics ===
==== Field players ====
All statistics include only NWSL Challenge Cup and NWSL Fall Series matches, and are correct as of July 26, 2020.

Name	Pos.	Country	Acquired From	Tenure	Apps.	Mins.	G	A
Paige Nielsen	FW/DF	USA	(Australia) Canberra United FC	2019–	5	450	0	0
Sam Staab	DF	USA	(United States) Clemson Tigers	2019–	5	450	1	0
Ashley Hatch	FW	USA	(United States) North Carolina Courage	2018–	5	379	1	1
Tegan McGrady	DF/FW	USA	(United States) Stanford Cardinal	2019–	5	378	0	0
Ashley Sanchez	MF	USA	(United States) Stanford Cardinal	2020–	5	356	0	1
Bayley Feist	MF/FW	USA	(United States) Wake Forest Demon Deacons	2019–	5	342	1	0
Tori Huster	DF	USA	(Australia) Newcastle Jets	2013–	5	339	0	0
Dorian Bailey	MF	USA	(United States) North Carolina Tar Heels	2019–	5	318	0	0
Andi Sullivan	MF	USA	(United States) Stanford Cardinal	2018–	4	300	0	0
Kumi Yokoyama	MF/FW	JPN	(Japan) AC Nagano Parceiro	2020–	4	266	0	0
Rose Lavelle	MF	USA	(United States) Boston Breakers	2018–2020	4	207	1	0
Jordan Baggett	MF	USA	(United States) Stanford Cardinal	2019–	3	191	0	0
Natalie Jacobs	MF/DF	USA	(United States) USC Trojans	2020–	3	147	0	0
Megan Dougherty Howard	MF	USA	(United States) University of Florida	2017–	3	124	0	0
Jaye Boissiere	MF	USA	(France) Le Havre AC	2020	2	65	0	0
Averie Collins	FW	USA	(United States) Washington State Cougars	2020–	3	61	0	0
Jenna Hellstron	FW	CAN	(Sweden) KIF Örebro	2020	3	56	0	0
Crystal Thomas	FW	USA	(United States) Georgetown University	2017, 2019–2020	1	29	0	0
Katie McClure	FW	USA	(United States) Kansas Jayhawks	2020	2	28	0	0
Brooke Hendrix	DF	USA	(England) West Ham United F.C.	2020	1	14	0	0
Meghan McCool	FW	USA	(United States) Virginia Cavaliers	2020	0	0	0	0
Kaiya McCullough	DF	USA	(United States) UCLA Bruins	2020	0	0	0	0

==== Goalkeepers ====
All statistics include only NWSL Challenge Cup and NWSL Fall Series matches, and are correct as of July 26, 2020.

Name	Country	Acquired From	Tenure	Apps.	Mins.	W	L	D	GA	GAA	SO
Aubrey Kingsbury	USA	(United States) Orlando Pride	2018–	5	450	2	2	1	4	0.8	2
Devon Kerr	CAN	(United States) Houston Dash	2020–	0	0	0	0	0	0	0	0
Katie Lund	USA	(United States) Arkansas Razorbacks	2020–	0	0	0	0	0	0	0	0
