= 2014 Washington Spirit season =

Washington Spirit
2014 season
- General manager: Chris Hummer
- Head coach: Mark Parsons
- Stadium: Maryland SoccerPlex
- NWSL: 4th
- NWSL Playoffs: Semi-finals
- Top goalscorer: League: Jodie Taylor (11); All: Jodie Taylor (11)
- Highest home attendance: 4,667 (May 3, 2014 vs Seattle)
- Lowest home attendance: 2,306 (April 13, 2014 vs WNY Flash)
- Average home league attendance: 3,335
Home colors	Away colors

The 2014 season was Washington Spirit's second season of existence in which they competed in the National Women's Soccer League, the top division of women's soccer in the United States.

== Review ==
Coming off a tough inaugural season, the Spirit looked to build a contending team for the 2014 season. Mark Parsons had a full preseason to work with his team and made some key offseason acquisitions included Jodie Taylor and Christine Nairn, both who would finish as the team's tops scorers with 11 and 8 goals, respectively.

The beginning of the season saw similar struggles to 2013, losing 4 of the opening 6 matches. The turn-around began in Week 7, when the Spirit would outscore the Western New York Flash 3–2 with a brace from Jodie Taylor and own goal equalizer. The Spirit went 5 matches unbeaten mid-season and finished the season strong, losing only two of their last ten matches.

Finishing 4th, the Spirit made their first NWSL Playoff appearance. They ultimately lost at Seattle Reign in a 2–1 match with Verónica Pérez scoring the Spirit's first ever playoff goal in the 65th minute.

== Club ==
=== Roster ===
As of April 24, 2014: Note: Flags indicate national team as defined under FIFA eligibility rules; some limited exceptions apply. Players may hold more than one non-FIFA nationality.

No.	Pos.	Nation	Player
1	GK	USA	Ashlyn Harris (FP)
2	FW	USA	Colleen Williams
3	DF	USA	Toni Pressley
4	MF	USA	Yael Averbuch (FP)
5	DF	CAN	Robyn Gayle (FP)
6	MF	USA	Lori Lindsey
7	MF	USA	Christine Nairn
8	MF	CAN	Diana Matheson (FP)
9	FW	MEX	Renae Cuellar (FP)
10	FW	USA	Caroline Miller
11	DF	USA	Ali Krieger (FP)
12	DF	DEN	Cecilie Sandvej

No.	Pos.	Nation	Player
14	FW	ENG	Jodie Taylor
16	FW	USA	Tiffany Weimer
17	MF	MEX	Verónica Pérez
18	GK	USA	Chantel Jones
19	MF	USA	Crystal Dunn
21	GK	USA	Adelaide Gay
22	MF	MEX	Bianca Sierra
23	DF	USA	Tori Huster
24	FW	USA	Jasmyne Spencer
28	DF	USA	Jordan Angeli
99	FW	USA	Danesha Adams

- (FP) = Federation player

=== Team management ===
Owner	Bill Lynch
General Manager	Chris Hummer
Head Coach	Mark Parsons

== Competitions ==
=== Preseason ===
March 22, 2014 1	Washington Spirit	2–0	North Carolina Tar Heels	Boyds, Maryland
	Matheson 69'; Weimer 89'	Report		Stadium: Maryland SoccerPlex; Attendance: 2,534

March 29, 2014 2	Washington Spirit	1–1	Virginia Cavaliers	Boyds, Maryland
	Pressley 38'	Report	Alexis Shaffer 10'	Stadium: Maryland SoccerPlex

April 5, 2014 3	Washington Spirit	7–0	Maryland Terrapins	Boyds, Maryland
	Taylor 15' 71' 90'; Gayle 20'; Dunn 30'; Matheson 32'; Averbuch 82'	Report		Stadium: Maryland SoccerPlex

=== Regular season ===
April 13, 2014 1	Washington Spirit	1–3	Western New York Flash	Boyds, Maryland
18:30 EST	Barczuk 50'	Report	Losada 54' 67'; Taylor 54'	Stadium: Maryland SoccerPlex; Attendance: 2,306; Referee: Miguel Panduro

April 19, 2014 2	Washington Spirit	3–1	FC Kansas City	Boyds, Maryland
19:00 EST	Matheson 4' 38'; Nairn 45'	Report	Rodriguez 29'	Stadium: Maryland SoccerPlex; Attendance: 2,577; Referee: Matthew Franz

April 23, 2014 3	Seattle Reign FC	3–1	Washington Spirit	Seattle, Washington
19:00 (PDT)	Fletcher 3'; Winters 48'; Fishlock 80'	Report	Matheson 73' (pen.)	Stadium: Memorial Stadium; Attendance: 1,754; Referee: Josh Wilkens

Apr 26, 2014 4	Chicago Red Stars	0–1	Washington Spirit	Lisle, Illinois
20:00	Johnston (yellow card) 67'	Box Score	Huster 50'; Sierra (yellow card) 55'; Dunn (yellow card) 70'; Matheson (yellow card) 71'	Stadium: Benedictine U. Sports Complex Stadium; Attendance: 1,822

May 3, 2014 5	Washington Spirit	1–2	Seattle Reign FC	Boyds, Maryland
18:30	Krieger 53'	Box Score	Fishlock 55'; Leroux 76'	Stadium: Maureen Hendricks Field Maryland SoccerPlex; Attendance: 4,667; Referee: Elvis Mahmutovic

May 11, 2014 6	FC Kansas City	2–1	Washington Spirit	Kansas City, Missouri
19:00	Rodriguez 35', 64'	Box Score	Gayle (yellow card) 50'; Adams 63'	Stadium: Durwood Soccer Stadium; Attendance: 1,797; Referee: Matt Mercier

May 17, 2014 7	Washington Spirit	3–2	Western New York Flash	Boyds, Maryland
18:30	Taylor 11', 78'; Williamson 71' (o.g.)	Box Score	Wambach 18'; Lloyd 30'; Salem (yellow card) 75' (yellow-red card) 90+5'	Stadium: Maureen Hendricks Field Maryland SoccerPlex; Attendance: 4,598; Referee: Katja Koroleva

May 21, 2014 8	Washington Spirit	3–3	Sky Blue FC	Boyds, Maryland
19:00	Gayle 38'; Lindsey 74'; Matheson 90+2' (pen.)	Box Score	Filigno 47' (yellow card) 55'; Freels 51'; O'Hara 65'	Stadium: Maureen Hendricks Field Maryland SoccerPlex; Attendance: 2,545; Referee: Boris Senic

May 26, 2014 9	Washington Spirit	3–2	Houston Dash	Boyds, Maryland
16:00	Matheson 4'; Taylor 38'; Nairn 90+3'	Box Score	Burger 12'; Ohale 77'	Stadium: Maureen Hendricks Field Maryland SoccerPlex; Attendance: 2,865; Referee: Matthew Franz

Jun 1, 2014 10	Boston Breakers	2–3	Washington Spirit	Boston, Massachusetts
18:30	Sanderson 29', 37'	Box Score	Nairn 33'; Taylor 49', 74'	Stadium: Harvard Stadium; Attendance: 2,876; Referee: Karen Abt

June 4, 2014 11	Chicago Red Stars	0-1	Washington Spirit	Lisle, Illinois
19:00 CDT (UTC−05)	Morway (yellow card) 40'	Summary	Gayle (yellow card) 27'; Taylor 79'; Pérez (yellow card) 90'	Stadium: Village of Lisle-Benedictine University Sports Complex; Attendance: 1450; Referee: (United States) Josh Wilkens

Jun 11, 2014 12	Boston Breakers	2–0	Washington Spirit	Boston, Massachusetts
19:00	Schoepfer 42'; Jones 43'	Box Score	Adams (yellow card) 60'	Stadium: Harvard Stadium; Attendance: 1,429; Referee: Timon Berry

Jun 15, 2014 13	Portland Thorns FC	2–0	Washington Spirit	Portland, Oregon
17:00	McDonald 11'; Boquete 78'	Box Score	Angeli (yellow card) 45+2' (red card) 86'	Stadium: Providence Park; Attendance: 10,056; Referee: Michael Zapata

Jun 21, 2014 14	Washington Spirit	1–6	Portland Thorns FC	Boyds, Maryland
18:30	Gayle (yellow card) 9'; Nairn 62'	Box Score	Sinclair 5'; Morgan 11', 70'; Brooks (yellow card) 59'; McDonald 85', 87'; Menges (yellow card) 88'; Long 90+1'	Stadium: Maureen Hendricks Field Maryland SoccerPlex; Attendance: 3,806; Referee: Kristen Salazar

Jun 28, 2014 15	Houston Dash	0–1	Washington Spirit	Houston, Texas
21:00		Box score	Taylor 62'	Stadium: BBVA Compass Stadium; Attendance: 4,050; Referee: Maraget Domka

Jul 2, 2014 16	Washington Spirit	3–3	Boston Breakers	Boyds, Maryland
19:00	Taylor 28', 56'; De Vanna (yellow card) 30'; Krieger (yellow card) 87'; Matheson 90+1' (pen.)	Box Score	O'Reilly 4' (pen.), 7' (pen.) (yellow card) 19'; Reeves 44'; Lohman (yellow card) 45+1'; Evans (red card) 70'; Sierra (yellow card) 90'	Stadium: Maureen Hendricks Field Maryland SoccerPlex; Attendance: 2,673; Referee: Dimitar Chavdarov

Jul 12, 2014 17	Western New York Flash	0–1	Washington Spirit	Rochester, New York
19:00	Reynolds (red card) 54'	Box Score	Taylor (yellow card) 52'; Matheson 56' (pen.); Nairn (yellow card) 73'	Stadium: Sahlen's Stadium; Attendance: 3,134; Referee: Chris Spivey

Jul 17, 2014 18	Houston Dash	1–1	Washington Spirit	Houston, Texas
21:00	Diggs 74'	Box Score	De Vanna 19'	Stadium: BBVA Compass Stadium; Attendance: 3,561; Referee: Michael Zapata

Jul 20, 2014 19	Sky Blue FC	4–2	Washington Spirit	Piscataway, New Jersey
18:00	O'Hara 22', 85'; Schmidt 36'; Nadim 81'	Box Score	Gayle (yellow card) 57' (goal) 89'; Taylor 88'	Stadium: Yurcak Field; Attendance: 1,740; Referee: Bernhard Hosu

Jul 23, 2014 20	Washington Spirit	1–1	Portland Thorns FC	Boyds, Maryland
19:00	Taylor 68'	Box Score	Morgan 7'	Stadium: Maureen Hendricks Field Maryland SoccerPlex; Attendance: 3,854; Referee: Katja Koroleva

Jul 30, 2014 21	Washington Spirit	2–1	FC Kansas City	Boyds, Maryland
19:00	Garefrekes 49'; Nairn 67'	Box Score	Sauerbrunn 18'	Stadium: Maureen Hendricks Field Maryland SoccerPlex; Attendance: 2,744; Referee: Kristen Salazar

August 2, 2014 22	Washington Spirit	2–1	Chicago Red Stars	Boyds, Maryland
18:30 EDT (UTC−04)	Nairn 47' (yellow card) 82'; Averbuch 90+4'	Box Score	Chalupny 3'; Hoy (yellow card) 28'; Santacaterina (yellow card) 30'	Stadium: Maryland SoccerPlex; Attendance: 3,102; Referee: Chris Spivey

Aug 9, 2014 23	Seattle Reign FC	1–1	Washington Spirit	Seattle, Washington
22:00	Reed (yellow card) 16'; Little 89'; Fishlock (yellow card) 90'	http://us.women.soccerway.com/matches/2014/08/10/united-states/national-womens-soccer-league/seattle-reign/washington-spirit/1648595/ Box Score]	Matheson 29'	Stadium: Memorial Stadium; Attendance: 3,479; Referee: (United States) Elvis Mahmutovic

Aug 16, 2014 24	Washington Spirit	0–1	Sky Blue FC	Boyds, Maryland
18:30		Box Score	Ocampo 27'	Stadium: Maureen Hendricks Field Maryland SoccerPlex; Attendance: 4,282; Referee: David Mon

==== Regular-season standings ====
Pos	Team	Pld	W	D	L	GF	GA	GD	Pts	Qualification
1	Seattle Reign FC	24	16	6	2	50	20	+30	54	NWSL Shield
2	FC Kansas City (C)	24	12	5	7	39	32	+7	41	NWSL Playoffs
3	Portland Thorns FC	24	10	6	8	39	35	+4	36	NWSL Playoffs
4	Washington Spirit	24	10	5	9	36	43	−7	35	NWSL Playoffs
5	Chicago Red Stars	24	9	8	7	32	26	+6	35	
6	Sky Blue FC	24	9	7	8	30	37	−7	34	
7	Western New York Flash	24	8	4	12	42	38	+4	28	
8	Boston Breakers	24	6	2	16	37	53	−16	20	
9	Houston Dash	24	5	3	16	23	44	−21	18	

Source: NWSL
Rules for classification: Tiebreakers
(C) Champions

==== Results summary ====
Overall								Home						Away					
Pld	W	D	L	GF	GA	GD	Pts	W	D	L	GF	GA	GD	W	D	L	GF	GA	GD
24	10	5	9	36	43	−7	35	5	3	4	23	26	−3	5	2	5	13	17	−4

Last updated: August 16, 2014.
Source: Match reports

Round	1	2	3	4	5	6	7	8	9	10	11	12	13	14	15	16	17	18	19	20	21	22	23	24
Stadium	H	H	A	A	H	A	H	H	H	A	A	A	A	H	A	H	A	A	A	H	H	H	A	H
Result	L	W	L	W	L	L	W	D	W	W	W	L	L	L	W	D	W	D	L	D	W	W	D	L

Updated to match(es) played on August 16, 2014. Source: Match reports
A = Away; H = Home; W = Win; D = Draw; L = Loss

=== NWSL Playoffs ===
August 23, 2014 Semi-finals	Seattle Reign FC	2–1	Washington Spirit	Seattle, Washington
8:00 pm PDT	Little 72'; Rapinoe 82'; Fletcher (yellow card) 90+5'	Report	Averbuch (yellow card) 31'; Pérez 65'; Nairn (yellow card) 90+2'	Stadium: Memorial Stadium; Attendance: 4,540; Referee: Timon Berry

== Squad statistics ==
Note: only regular season squad statistics displayed.

Key to positions: FW – Forward, MF – Midfielder, DF – Defender, GK – Goalkeeper

N	Pos	Player	GP	GS	Min	G	A	WG	Shot	SOG	Cro	CK	Off	Foul	FS	YC	RC
99	FW	Danesha Adams	13	9	802	1	1	0	8	4	3	6	1	10	7	1	0
28	MF	Jordan Angeli	10	2	235	0	0	0	1	0	0	0	0	6	0	1	1
4	MF	Yael Averbuch	22	17	1562	1	1	1	15	4	0	0	0	16	9	1	0
12	DF	Niki Cross	10	8	740	0	0	0	1	0	0	0	0	5	5	0	0
9	FW	Renae Cuellar	10	4	408	0	0	0	4	1	2	0	6	4	3	0	0
24	FW	Lisa De Vanna	11	9	794	1	4	0	16	9	0	0	12	6	13	1	0
19	MF	Crystal Dunn	21	18	1488	0	3	0	11	6	2	0	2	15	10	1	0
13	FW	Kerstin Garefrekes	10	6	591	1	0	0	19	11	0	0	4	8	6	0	0
5	DF	Robyn Gayle	16	13	1143	2	1	0	7	3	1	0	0	13	2	4	0
23	DF	Tori Huster	22	22	1980	1	1	1	9	4	0	0	0	12	17	0	0
11	DF	Ali Krieger	22	22	1935	1	0	0	5	3	3	0	1	7	4	1	0
6	MF	Lori Lindsey	22	19	1509	1	1	0	15	6	0	0	0	6	9	0	0
8	MF	Diana Matheson	23	21	1970	8	6	2	28	19	5	18	6	14	24	2	0
7	MF	Christine Nairn	23	21	1838	6	2	2	41	18	0	52	4	7	27	2	0
36	MF	Kelsey Pardue	1	0	9	0	0	0	0	0	0	0	0	0	0	0	0
17	MF	Verónica Pérez	16	6	657	0	1	0	8	3	0	0	8	16	8	1	0
3	DF	Toni Pressley	9	8	701	0	0	0	2	0	0	0	0	9	1	0	0
22	DF	Bianca Sierra	9	5	520	0	0	0	2	1	2	0	0	6	2	1	0
21	DF	Alex Singer	11	11	972	0	0	0	2	0	0	0	4	11	3	0	0
31	MF	Jennifer Skogerboe	1	0	15	0	0	0	0	0	0	0	0	1	0	0	0
14	FW	Jodie Taylor	21	19	1727	11	2	4	46	26	2	0	34	25	13	1	0

N	Pos	Goal keeper	GP	GS	Min	W	L	T	Shot	SOG	Sav	GA	GA/G	Pen	PKF	SO
1	GK	Ashlyn Harris	19	19	1710	10	5	4	193	97	66	31	1.632	2	3	4
18	GK	Chantel Jones	5	5	450	0	4	1	78	34	22	12	2.4	0	0	0

== Transfers ==
=== In ===
No.	Pos.	Player	Transferred from	Fee/notes	Date	Source
7	MF	(United States) Christine Nairn	(United States) Seattle Reign	Trade	November 20, 2013	
14	FW	(England) Jodie Taylor	(Australia) Sydney FC	Signed	December 18, 2013	
4	MF	(United States) Yael Averbuch	(Sweden) Kopparbergs/Göteborg FC	NWSL Player Allocation	January 3, 2014	
9	FW	(Mexico) Renae Cuéllar	(United States) FC Kansas City	NWSL Player Allocation	January 3, 2014	
99	FW	(United States) Danesha Adams	(United States) Houston Dash	Trade	January 13, 2014	
16	FW	(United States) Tiffany Weimer	(United States) Portland Thorns FC	Trade	January 17, 2014	
12	DF	(Denmark) Cecilie Sandvej	(Australia) Perth Glory	Signed	February 27, 2014	
17	MF	(Mexico) Verónica Pérez	(United States) Western New York Flash	Trade	March 3, 2014	
12	DF	(Germany) Niki Cross	(Germany) FC Bayern Munich	Trade	March 18, 2014	
22	MF	(Mexico) Bianca Sierra	(United States) University of Auburn	Signed	April 4, 2014	
28	DF	(United States) Jordan Angeli	(United States) Boston Breakers	Signed	April 4, 2014	
21	GK	(United States) Adelaide Gay	(United States) Portland Thorns FC	Signed	April 8, 2014	
21	DF	(United States) Alex Singer	(Germany) 1. FFC Turbine Potsdam	Signed	June 4, 2014	
24	FW	(Australia) Lisa De Vanna	(United States) Boston Breakers	Trade	June 18, 2014	
31	MF	(United States) Jennifer Skogerboe	(United States) Washington Spirit Reserves			
36	MF	(United States) Kelsey Pardue	(United States) Washington Spirit Reserves			

=== Out ===
No.	Pos.	Player	Transferred to	Fee/notes	Date	Source
3	DF	(United States) Kika Toulouse	(United States) Houston Dash	2014 NWSL Expansion Draft	January 10, 2014	
14	FW	(United States) Tiffany McCarty	(United States) Houston Dash	2014 NWSL Expansion Draft	January 10, 2014	
22	MF	(United States) Stephanie Ochs	(United States) Houston Dash	Trade	January 13, 2014	
4	DF	(United States) Marisa Abegg		Retired	February 14, 2014	
5	DF	(Canada) Candace Chapman		Waived	March 29, 2014	
20	MF	(United States) Holly King	(United States) Colorado Pride		March 29, 2014	
2	FW	(United States) Colleen Williams		Waived	May 21, 2014	
23	DF	(Mexico) Bianca Sierra	(United States) Boston Breakers	Trade	June 18, 2014	
	MF	(United States) Ingrid Wells	(United States) Western New York Flash	Waived	June 20, 2013	
	DF	(United States) Domenica Hodak				
13	MF	(Mexico) Guadalupe Worbis				
24	FW	(United States) Jasmyne Spencer	(United States) Western New York Flash			
13	MF	(United States) Julia Roberts				
17	FW	(United States) Lindsay Taylor				

=== Loan in ===
No.	Pos.	Player	Loaned from	Fee/notes	Date	Source
13	MF	(Germany) Kerstin Garefrekes	(Germany) 1. FFC Frankfurt	Loan for remainder of 2014 season	June 14, 2014	

== Honors and awards ==
=== NWSL Yearly Awards ===
==== NWSL Team of the Year ====
Team	Position	Player	Ref.
Best XI	Defender	(United States) Ali Krieger	
Second X1	Forward	(England) Jodie Taylor	

== See also ==
- 2014 National Women's Soccer League season
