= 2013 Washington Spirit season =

Washington Spirit
2013 season
- General manager: Chris Hummer
- Head coach: Mark Parsons
- Stadium: Maryland SoccerPlex
- NWSL: 8th
- Top goalscorer: Diana Matheson (8 goals)
- Highest home attendance: 5,011 (May 4, 2013 vs Portland Thorns FC)
- Lowest home attendance: 2,081 (August 7, 2013 vs Chicago Red Stars)
- Average home league attendance: 3,754
Home colors	Away colors

The 2013 season was Washington Spirit's first season of existence in which they competed in the National Women's Soccer League, the top division of women's soccer in the United States.

== Review ==
The inaugural Spirit roster began to assemble on January 11, 2013, as part of the NWSL Player Allocation, goalkeeper Ashlyn Harris (USA), defender Ali Krieger (USA), midfielder Lori Lindsey (USA), defender Robyn Gayle (CAN), midfielder Diana Matheson (CAN), defender Alina Garciamendez (MEX) and midfielder Teresa Worbis (MEX) were named to the team. During the February 7, 2013 NWSL Supplemental Draft, the team selected Stephanie Ochs, Tori Huster, Jordan Angeli, Natasha Kai, Megan Mischler and Heather Cooke.

The Spirit played their first competitive match on April 14, 2013, drawing Boston Breakers 1–1 with Tiffany McCarty scoring the team's first goal assisted by Stephanie Ochs. The Spirit won their first competitive match on May 16, 2013, when they defeated the Seattle Reign 2–4 at Starfire Stadium. As the season wore on, the Spirit struggled to gain form and after the first eleven matches, Mike Jorden was fired and replaced by Mark Parsons.

The coaching transition would be tough, and the Spirit continued the season with a 13-match winless streak (only one draw) until finishing the season on a high with two wins and a draw. Washington finished their first season in last place (8th).

== Club ==
=== Roster ===
Note: Flags indicate national team as defined under FIFA eligibility rules; some limited exceptions apply. Players may hold more than one non-FIFA nationality.

No.	Pos.	Nation	Player
1	GK	USA	Ashlyn Harris (FP)
2	FW	USA	Colleen Williams
3	DF	USA	Kika Toulouse
4	DF	USA	Domenica Hodak
4	DF	USA	Marisa Abegg
5	DF	CAN	Candace Chapman
6	MF	USA	Lori Lindsey (FP)
7	MF	MEX	Teresa "Lupita" Worbis (FP)
8	MF	CAN	Diana Matheson (FP)
9	MF	USA	Ingrid Wells
10	FW	USA	Caroline Miller
11	DF	USA	Ali Krieger (FP)

No.	Pos.	Nation	Player
13	MF	USA	Julia Roberts
14	FW	USA	Tiffany McCarty
15	DF	CAN	Robyn Gayle (FP)
16	FW	GER	Conny Pohlers (on loan from VfL Wolfsburg)
17	FW	USA	Lindsay Taylor
18	GK	USA	Chantel Jones
19	DF	USA	Toni Pressley
20	MF	USA	Holly King
22	FW	USA	Stephanie Ochs
23	MF	USA	Tori Huster
24	FW	USA	Jasmyne Spencer

=== Team management ===
Owner	Bill Lynch
General Manager	Chris Hummer
Head Coach	Mark Parsons

== Competitions ==
=== Preseason ===
March 17, 2013 1	Washington Spirit	1–0	Penn State Nittany Lions	TBD
16:00 EST	Wagner 87'	Report		Stadium: TBD

March 30, 2013 2	Washington Spirit	2–0	North Carolina Tar Heels	Boyds, Maryland
15:00 EST	Miller 27', 48'	Report		Stadium: Maryland SoccerPlex; Attendance: 1,725

April 4, 2013 3	Maryland Terrapins	2–0	Washington Spirit	College Park, Maryland
19:30 EST	Huster 22' (o.g.); Prior-Brown 68'	Report		Stadium: Ludwig Field; Attendance: 1,000

April 7, 2013 4	Washington Spirit	3–6	Virginia Cavaliers	Boyds, Maryland
19:30 EST	McCarty 32', 42'; Spencer 73'	Report	Douglas 5'; Torres 24'; Fry 33'; Doniak 36', 40'; Brian 64'	Stadium: Maryland SoccerPlex; Attendance: 312

=== Regular season ===
April 14, 2013 1	Boston Breakers	1–1	Washington Spirit	Somerville, Massachusetts
18:30 EDT	Leroux 91+' (Guess)	Report	McCarty 15' (Ochs); Wells (yellow card) 50'	Stadium: Dilboy Stadium; Attendance: 2,634; Referee: Christina Unkel

April 20, 2013 2	Washington Spirit	1–1	Western New York Flash	Germantown, Maryland
19:00 EDT	Huster (yellow card) 84'; Matheson 87' (pen.)	Report	Kerr 85' (Wambach)	Stadium: Maryland SoccerPlex; Attendance: 4,569; Referee: Kari Seitz

April 27, 2013 3	Washington Spirit	1–2	Sky Blue	Germantown, Maryland
19:00 EDT	Matheson 35'	Report	Goodson 2'; Schmidt 48'	Stadium: Maryland SoccerPlex; Attendance: 4,569; Referee: Kara Honthumb

May 4, 2013 4	Washington Spirit	1–2	Portland Thorns	Germantown, Maryland
19:00 EDT	Harris (yellow card) 13'; Matheson 86' (pen.)	Report	Morgan 12' (pen.); Washington 51'; Long (yellow card) 70'; Edwards (yellow card) 82'	Stadium: Maryland SoccerPlex; Attendance: 5,011; Referee: Christina Unkel

May 11, 2013 5	Washington Spirit	1–1	Boston Breakers	Germantown, Maryland
19:00 EDT	Lindsey 51' (Matheson)	Report	Lohman 24' (Sanderson)	Stadium: Maryland SoccerPlex; Attendance: 4,027; Referee: Josh Wilkens

May 16, 2013 6	Seattle Reign FC	2–4	Washington Spirit	Tukwila, Washington
19:00 PDT	Taylor 7' (Larsen); Noyola 47' (Nairn); Larsen (yellow card) 68'; Zurrer (yellow card) 83'	Report	Matheson 37'; Krieger 41'; McCarty 56'; Krieger (yellow card) 63'; Roberts (yellow card) 75'; Huster 84' (Lindsey)	Stadium: Starfire Stadium; Attendance: 1,011; Referee: Katja Koroleva

May 19, 2013 7	Portland Thorns FC	2–0	Washington Spirit	Portland, Oregon
14:00 PDT	Sinclair 41' (Long); Morgan 86' (Wetzel); Marshall (yellow card) 65'	Report	Gayle (yellow card) 83'	Stadium: JELD-WEN Field; Attendance: 12,474; Referee: Robert Sibiga

May 25, 2013 8	Boston Breakers	3–0	Washington Spirit	Somerville, Massachusetts
18:30 EDT	O'Reilly 38' (Sanderson); Shoepfer 53' (Sanderson); Simon 66' (Sanderson)	Report		Stadium: Dilboy Stadium; Attendance: 1,246; Referee: Kara Honthumb

June 15, 2013 9	Washington Spirit	0–2	Western New York Flash	Germantown, Maryland
19:00 EDT		Report	Pérez 10' (Adriana); DiMartino 31' (Sahlen) (yellow card) 36'; Adriana (yellow card) 55'	Stadium: Maryland SoccerPlex; Attendance: 4,569; Referee: (United States) Boris Senic

June 23, 2013 10	FC Kansas City	2–0	Washington Spirit	Overland Park, Kansas
20:35 EDT	Holiday 17', 65'	Summary	Pressley (yellow card) 29'	Stadium: Shawnee Mission District Stadium; Attendance: 3,057; Referee: (United States) Katja Koroleva

June 28, 2013 11	Western New York Flash	4–0	Washington Spirit	Rochester, New York
19:05 EDT	Lloyd 3' (Sahlen), 22' (Wambach), 55'; Taylor 90+1' (Wambach)	Report		Stadium: Sahlen's Stadium; Attendance: 3,364; Referee: (United States) Margaret Domka

July 3, 2013 12	Washington Spirit	1–1	FC Kansas City	Germantown, Maryland
19:30 EDT	Matheson 86' (pen.)	Report	Tymrak 54' (Mathias)	Stadium: Maryland SoccerPlex; Attendance: 2,467; Referee: (United States) Kara Honthumb

July 6, 2013 13	Sky Blue	1–0	Washington Spirit	Piscataway, New Jersey
19:00 EDT	Ocampo 74'	Report		Stadium: Yurcak Field; Attendance: 1,322; Referee: (United States) John McCloskey

July 10, 2013 14	Washington Spirit	0–2	Chicago Red Stars	Germantown, Maryland
19:30 EDT	Pohlers (yellow card) 90'	Report	Leon 63'; Masar 71' (Leon)	Stadium: Maryland SoccerPlex; Attendance: 2,593; Referee: Miguel Panduro

July 14, 2013 15	Seattle Reign FC	2–1	Washington Spirit	Tukwila, Washington
19:00 PDT	McDonald 30' (Nairn), 34' (Reed)	Report	Matheson 11' (pen.)	Stadium: Starfire Stadium; Attendance: 3,855; Referee: Katja Koroleva

July 20, 2013 16	Chicago Red Stars	1–0	Washington Spirit	Lisle, Illinois
18:00 CDT	McCarty 62' (o.g.); Sitch (yellow card) 87'	Report		Stadium: Village of Lisle-Benedictine University Sports Complex; Attendance: 1,241; Referee: Margaret Domka

July 27, 2013 17	Washington Spirit	2–5	Boston Breakers	Germantown, Maryland
19:00 EDT	Matheson 2' (Spencer); Pohlers 73' (Ochs)	Report	Nogueira 5' (O'Reilly); Sanderson 42' (Wilkinson); Wilkinson 48'; O'Reilly 57'; Whitehill 78'	Stadium: Maryland Soccerplex; Attendance: 2,607; Referee: Kara Honthumb

July 31, 2013 18	Western New York Flash	3–0	Washington Spirit	Rochester, New York
20:05 PDT	Martin 35' (Kerr); Kerr 60' (Reynolds); Lloyd 68'; Huffman (yellow card) 72'	Report		Stadium: Sahlen's Stadium; Attendance: 3,967; Referee: Miguel Panduro

August 3, 2013 19	Sky Blue FC	1–0	Washington Spirit	Piscataway, New Jersey
19:00 EST	Ocampo 58' (Freels)	Re port	Gayle (yellow card) 60'; Pohlers (yellow card) 68'	Stadium: Yurcak Field; Attendance: 2,172; Referee: Elvis Mahmutovic

August 7, 2013 20	Washington Spirit	1–0	Chicago Red Stars	Germantown, Maryland
19:30 EDT	Worbis 58'; Krieger (yellow card) 75'	Report		Stadium: Maryland SoccerPlex; Attendance: 2,081; Referee: Dimitar Chavdarov
Note: Match was called at 80' due to multiple lightning delays and a midnight curfew.

August 10, 2013 21	Washington Spirit	1–0	Seattle Reign FC	Germantown, Maryland
16:35 PDT	Matheson 83'	Report	Nairn (yellow card) 86'	Stadium: Maryland SoccerPlex; Attendance: 4,549; Referee: Kari Seitz

August 18, 2013 22	Washington Spirit	1–1	Sky Blue FC	Germantown, Maryland
17:00 EST	Ochs 40' (Worbis)	Report	Lytle 84'	Stadium: Maryland SoccerPlex; Attendance: 4,241; Referee: Kara Honthumb

==== Standings ====
Pos	Team	Pld	W	D	L	GF	GA	GD	Pts	Qualification
1	Western New York Flash	22	10	8	4	36	20	+16	38	NWSL Shield
2	FC Kansas City	22	11	5	6	34	22	+12	38	NWSL Playoffs
3	Portland Thorns FC (C)	22	11	5	6	32	25	+7	38	NWSL Playoffs
4	Sky Blue FC	22	10	6	6	31	26	+5	36	NWSL Playoffs
5	Boston Breakers	22	8	6	8	35	34	+1	30	
6	Chicago Red Stars	22	8	6	8	32	36	−4	30	
7	Seattle Reign FC	22	5	3	14	22	36	−14	18	
8	Washington Spirit	22	3	5	14	16	39	−23	14	

Source: soccerway.com
Rules for classification: Tiebreakers
(C) Champions

==== Results summary ====
Overall								Home						Away					
Pld	Pts	W	L	T	GF	GA	GD	W	L	T	GF	GA	GD	W	L	T	GF	GA	GD
22	14	3	14	5	16	39	−23	2	5	4	10	17	−7	1	9	1	6	22	−16

Last updated: 20 August 2013
Source: Soccerway
Pld = Matches played; Pts = Points; W = Matches won; T = Matches tied; L = Matches lost; GF = Goals for; GA = Goals against; GD = Goal difference

Round	1	2	3	4	5	6	7	8	9	10	11	12	13	14	15	16	17	18	19	20	21	22
Stadium	A	H	H	H	H	A	A	A	H	A	A	H	A	H	A	A	H	A	A	H	H	H
Result	D	D	L	L	D	W	L	L	L	L	L	D	L	L	L	L	L	L	L	W	W	D

Updated to match(es) played on 20 August 2013. Source: us.women.soccerway.com
A = Away; H = Home; W = Win; D = Draw; L = Loss

== Statistics ==
=== Appearances and goals ===
As of April 23, 2017

No.	Pos	Nat	Player	Total		NWSL	
No.	Pos	Nat	Player	Apps	Goals	Apps	Goals
2	FW	(United States) USA	Colleen Williams	6	0	6	0
3	DF	(United States) USA	Kika Toulouse	16	0	16	0
4	DF	(United States) USA	Domenica Hodak	11	0	11	0
4	DF	(United States) USA	Marisa Abegg	5	0	5	0
5	DF	(Canada) CAN	Candace Chapman	8	0	8	0
6	MF	(United States) USA	Lori Lindsey	21	1	21	1
7	MF	(Mexico) MEX	Lupita Worbis	11	1	11	1
8	MF	(Canada) CAN	Diana Matheson	19	8	19	8
9	MF	(United States) USA	Ingrid Wells	8	0	8	0
10	FW	(United States) USA	Caroline Miller	7	0	7	0
11	DF	(United States) USA	Ali Krieger	18	1	18	1
13	MF	(United States) USA	Julia Roberts	20	0	20	0
14	FW	(United States) USA	Tiffany McCarty	21	2	21	2
15	DF	(Canada) CAN	Robyn Gayle	14	0	14	0
16	FW	(Germany) GER	Conny Pohlers	13	1	13	1
17	FW	(United States) USA	Lindsay Taylor	6	0	6	0
19	DF	(United States) USA	Toni Pressley	8	0	8	0
20	MF	(United States) USA	Holly King	11	0	11	0
22	MF	(United States) USA	Stephanie Ochs	22	1	22	1
23	MF	(United States) USA	Tori Huster	21	1	21	1
24	FW	(United States) USA	Jasmyne Spencer	17	0	17	0

=== Top scorers ===
Players with one goal or more included only.

As of August 20, 2013

Rk.	Nat	Pos	Player	Total	NWSL
1	(Canada)	MF	Diana Matheson	8	8
2	(United States)	FW	Tiffany McCarty	2	2
3	(United States)	MF	Tori Huster	1	1
3	(United States)	DF	Ali Krieger	1	1
3	(United States)	MF	Lori Lindsey	1	1
3	(United States)	MF	Stephanie Ochs	1	1
3	(Germany)	FW	Conny Pohlers	1	1
3	(Mexico)	MF	Lupita Worbis	1	1

=== Top assists ===
Players with one assist or more included only.

As of August 20, 2013

Rk.	Nat	Pos	Player	Total	NWSL
1	(Canada)	MF	Diana Matheson	3	3
2	(United States)	MF	Lori Lindsey	2	2
2	(United States)	MF	Stephanie Ochs	2	2
3	(Canada)	DF	Robyn Gayle	1	1
3	(United States)	FW	Jasmyne Spencer	1	1

=== Disciplinary record ===
==== Disciplinary record ====
Players with 1 card or more included only.

As of August 20, 2013

No.	Nat	Pos	Player	Total		NWSL	
No.	Nat	Pos	Player	Booked	Sent off (straight red)	Booked	Sent off (straight red)
15	(Canada)	DF	Robyn Gayle	2	0	2	0
1	(United States)	GK	Ashlyn Harris	1	0	1	0
23	(Wales)	MF	Tori Huster	1	0	1	0
11	(United States)	DF	Ali Krieger	2	0	2	0
16	(Germany)	FW	Conny Pohlers	2	0	2	0
19	(United States)	DF	Toni Pressley	1	0	1	0
13	(United States)	MF	Julia Roberts	1	0	1	0

=== Goalkeeper stats ===
Last updated: August 20, 2013

No.	Nat	Player	National Women's Soccer League			
No.	Nat	Player	MIN	GA	GAA	SV
1	(United States)	Ashlyn Harris	1620	33	1.833	85
18	(United States)	Chantel Jones	350	6	1.5	15

== Transfers ==
=== In ===
No.	Pos.	Player	Transferred from	Fee/notes	Date	Source
1	GK	(United States) Ashlyn Harris	(Germany) FCR 2001 Duisburg	NWSL Player Allocation	January 11, 2013	
11	DF	(United States) Ali Krieger	(Germany) 1. FFC Frankfurt	NWSL Player Allocation	January 11, 2013	
6	MF	(United States) Lori Lindsey	(United States) Western New York Flash	NWSL Player Allocation	January 11, 2013	
15	DF	(Canada) Robyn Gayle	(Canada) Vancouver Whitecaps WFC	NWSL Player Allocation	January 11, 2013	
8	MF	(Canada) Diana Matheson	(Norway) LSK Kvinner	NWSL Player Allocation	January 11, 2013	
	DF	(Mexico) Alina Garciamendez	(United States) Stanford Cardinal	NWSL Player Allocation	January 11, 2013	opted not to play
7	MF	(Mexico) Teresa "Lupita" Worbis	Unknown	NWSL Player Allocation	January 11, 2013	
14	FW	(United States) Tiffany McCarty	(United States) Florida State Seminoles	Selected in the 2013 NWSL College Draft	January 18, 2013	
10	FW	(United States) Caroline Miller	(United States) Virginia Cavaliers	Selected in the 2013 NWSL College Draft	January 18, 2013	
20	MF	(United States) Holly King	(United States) Florida Gators	Selected in the 2013 NWSL College Draft	January 18, 2013	
2	MF	(United States) Colleen Williams	(United States) Dayton Flyers	Selected in the 2013 NWSL College Draft	January 18, 2013	
	MF	(United States) Ingrid Wells	(Sweden) Kopparbergs/Göteborg FC	Signed	February 6, 2013	
18	GK	(United States) Chantel Jones	(Iceland) Þór Akureyri	Signed	February 6, 2013	
22	FW	(United States) Stephanie Ochs	(United States) University of San Diego	2013 NWSL Supplemental Draft	February 7, 2013	
23	MF	(United States) Tori Huster	(United States) Florida State Seminoles	2013 NWSL Supplemental Draft	February 7, 2013	
3	DF	(United States) Kika Toulouse	(Sweden) Rågsveds IF	Signed	February 12, 2013	
	DF	(United States) Domenica Hodak	(United States) Maryland Terrapins	Discovery Player	March 9, 2013	
24	FW	(United States) Jasmyne Spencer	(Denmark) Brøndby IF	Signed	April 9, 2013	
19	DF	(United States) Toni Pressley	(Russia) Ryazan VDV	Signed	June 3, 2013	
17	FW	(United States) Lindsay Taylor	(United States) Seattle Reign FC	Traded for a 2014 NWSL College Draft second round pick	July 1, 2013	
4	FW	(United States) Marisa Abegg	(United States) Gulf Coast Texans	Signed on July 31, 2013	July 31, 2013	
5	FW	(Canada) Candace Chapman	(United States) Western New York Flash	Free agent	2013	
13	MF	(United States) Julia Roberts	(United States) Seattle Sounders Women		2013	

=== Loan in ===
No.	Pos.	Player	Transferred from	Fee/notes	Date	Source
16	FW	(Germany) Conny Pohlers	(Germany) VfL Wolfsburg	Signed in June 2013 – on loan from VfL Wolfsburg	June 11, 2013	

== Honors and awards ==
=== NWSL Yearly Awards ===
==== NWSL Team of the Year ====
Team	Position	Player	Ref.
Best XI	Midfielder	(Canada) Diana Matheson	
Second X1	Defender	(United States) Ali Krieger	

== See also ==
- 2013 National Women's Soccer League season
