= Domenica Hodak =

American soccer midfielder and defender (born 1991)

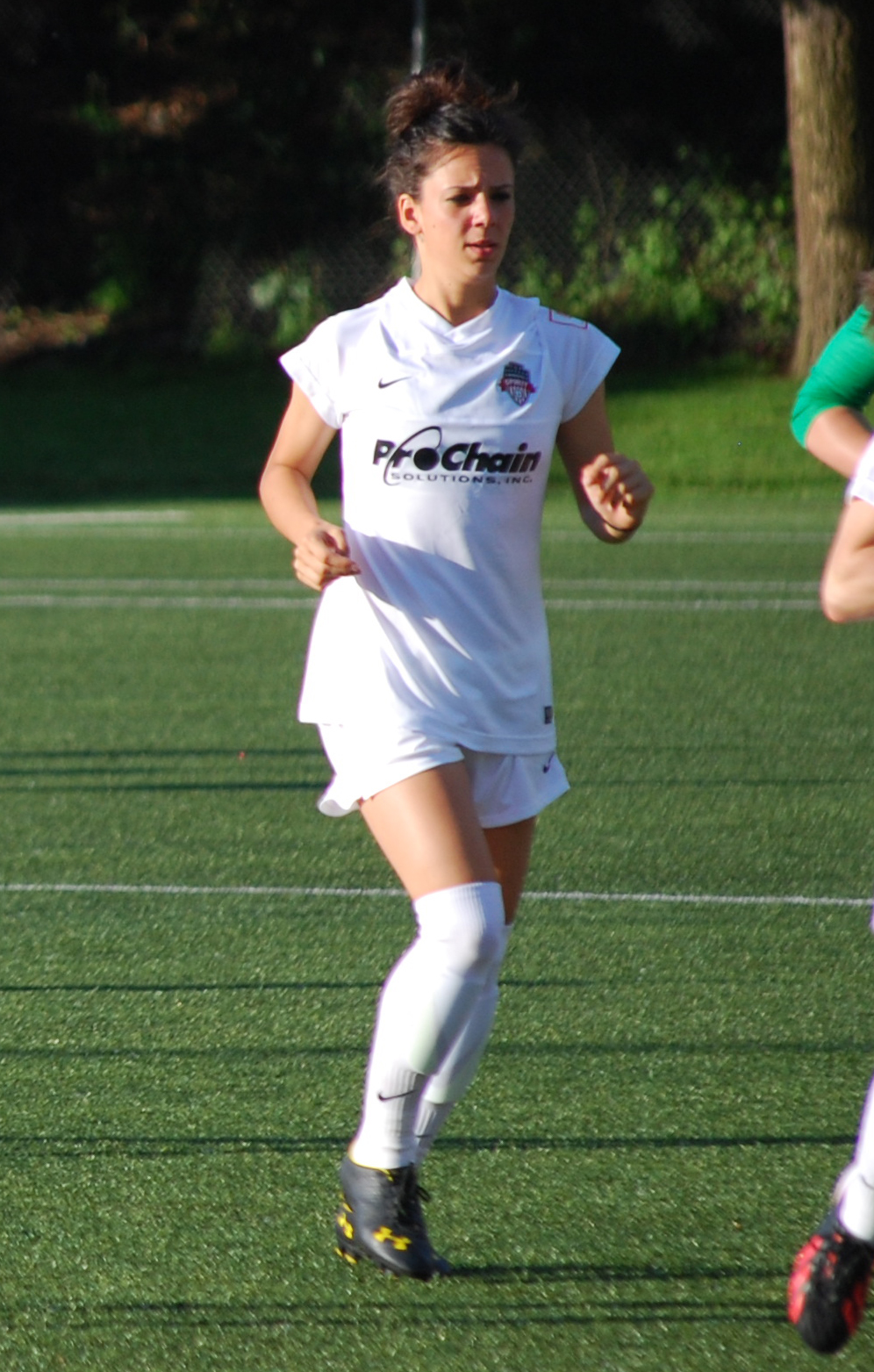

Personal information
- Full name: Domenica Rose Hodak
- Date of birth: August 20, 1991 (age 35)
- Place of birth: West Sayville, New York
- Height: 5 ft 4 in (1.63 m)
- Position: Defender

College career
Years	Team	Apps	(Gls)
2009–2012	Maryland Terrapins		

Senior career*
Years	Team	Apps	(Gls)
2013	Washington Spirit	11	(0)
- * Club domestic league appearances and goals

Domenica Rose Hodak (born August 20, 1991) is an American former soccer midfielder and defender who played for Washington Spirit in the National Women's Soccer League.

== Early life ==
Hodak was raised in Sayville, New York, where she attended Sayville High School and was a two-year captain for the girls soccer squad. She was a three-time first team all-state and two-time All-Long Island selection by Newsday. Hodak earned 2008 NYSCAA All-Region honors and was a three-time first team all-state member as well as a two-time Suffolk County Small School Player of the Year. Top Drawer Soccer named her one of the nation's top 100 recruits.

Hodak played club soccer for the Alberston Fury 90 for coach Paul Riley and helped the Fury to four State Cup championships and the 2008 Regional final. She was also a four-year member of the Region I Olympic Development Program (ODP) Team as well as a and five-time Eastern New York Olympic Development Program (ODP) and Regional Team member.

== College career ==
Hodak attended the University of Maryland where she played for the Maryland Terrapins from 2009 to 2012. During her collegiate career, Hodak made 82 appearances playing both midfielder and defender. As a central part of the Terps' defense, she helped lead the squad to a Sweet 16 appearance in the 2011 NCAA Tournament and a second round berth in 2012. In 2012, she was named to the NSCAA Third Team All-Southeast In 2012, she was named to the Atlantic Coast Conference (ACC) All-Tournament Team.

== Club career ==
In 2013, Hodak signed as a discovery player with the Washington Spirit for the inaugural season of the National Women's Soccer League.

== Career statistics ==
Appearances and goals by club, season and competition
Club	Season	League			Playoffs (Note: Includes NWSL playoffs)		Total	
Club	Season	Division	Apps	Goals	Apps	Goals	Apps	Goals
Washington Spirit	2013	NWSL	11	0	—		11	0
Career total			11	0	0	0	11	0
