= Julia Roberts (soccer) =

American soccer player

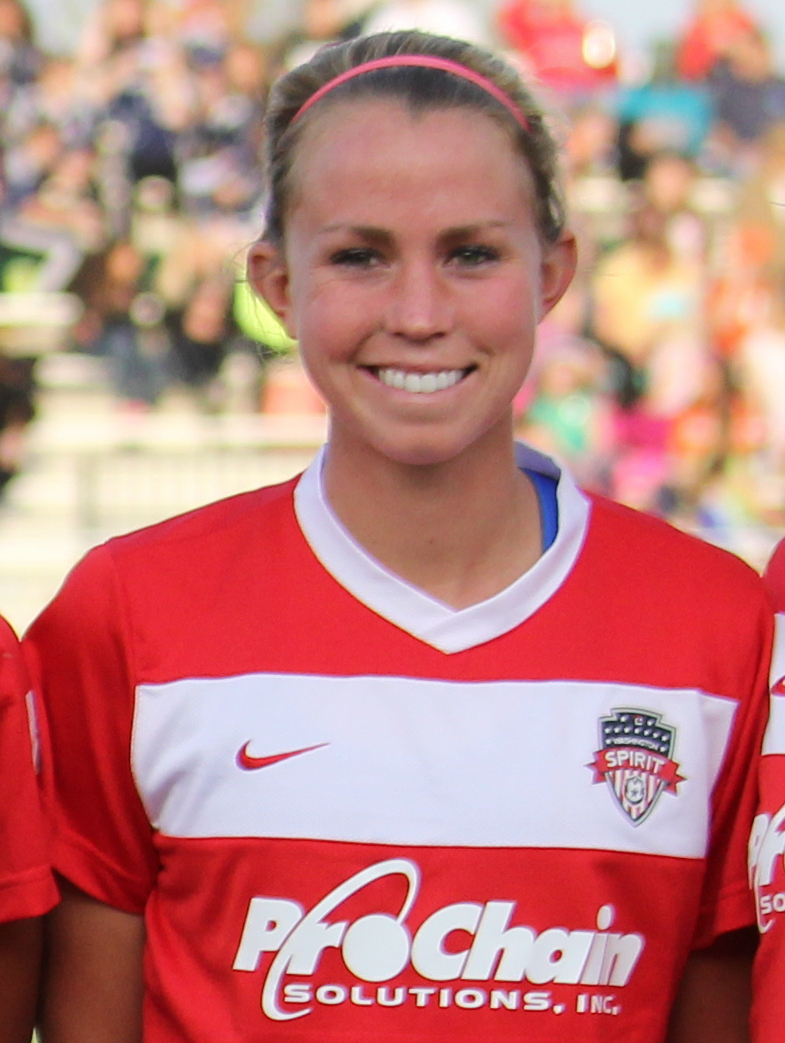

Personal information
- Full name: Julia Kaitlyn Roberts
- Date of birth: February 7, 1991 (age 35)
- Place of birth: Frederick, Maryland, United States
- Height: 5 ft 9 in (1.75 m)
- Position: Midfielder

College career
Years	Team	Apps	(Gls)
2009–2012	Virginia Cavaliers		

Senior career*
Years	Team	Apps	(Gls)
2012	Seattle Sounders Women	13	(0)
2013	Washington Spirit	20	(0)

International career
2008	United States U17		
- * Club domestic league appearances and goals as of April 14, 2013

Julia Kaitlyn Roberts (born February 7, 1991) is an American professional soccer midfielder who last played for the Washington Spirit in the NWSL. She previously played for the Seattle Sounders Women of the W-League and has represented the United States at the U-16, U-17, and U-20 levels.

== Early life ==
Roberts grew up in Frederick, Maryland, and attended Urbana High School. In 2007, she helped the school's soccer team to the 3A State Championship, scoring two goals in the final game that went into penalty kicks. She was a three-time NSCAA All-State selection in high school before forgoing her senior season to participate in the FIFA U-17 World Cup.

Roberts also helped her nationally ranked club team, the McLean Freedom, to a national title in 2007.

Roberts was named 2009 Parade All-American and 2007 and 2008 NSCAA All-American. She was named #4 of the top 50 girl soccer players by ESPN in 2009.

=== University of Virginia ===
Roberts attended the University of Virginia. In 2011, she helped the Cavaliers make the NCAA quarterfinals after five seasons of being eliminated in the third round. In 2012, she helped the Cavaliers win the ACC championship in the final match against Maryland.

== Playing career ==
=== Club ===
==== Seattle Sounders Women ====
In 2012, Roberts played for the Seattle Sounders Women. She made 13 appearances for a total of 932 minutes and provided one assist.

==== Washington Spirit ====
In March 2013, Roberts was drafted by the Washington Spirit as a discovery player.

=== International ===
Roberts previously played on the United States Women's U-16, U-17 and U-20 soccer teams.
