= Diana Matheson =

Canadian soccer player and executive (born 1984)

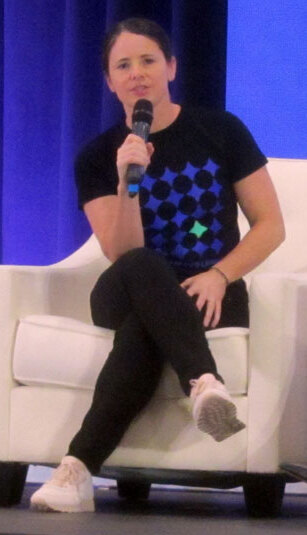
- Matheson in 2024

Personal information
- Full name: Diana Beverly Matheson
- Date of birth: April 6, 1984 (age 42)
- Place of birth: Mississauga, Ontario, Canada
- Height: 1.53 m (5 ft 0 in)
- Position: Midfielder

Youth career
- Oakville SC

College career
Years	Team	Apps	(Gls)
2004–2007	Princeton Tigers	57	(26)

Senior career*
Years	Team	Apps	(Gls)
2003	Toronto Inferno		
2004–2006	Ottawa Fury		
2008–2010	Team Strømmen	32	(11)
2013–2016	Washington Spirit	67	(23)
2017	Seattle Reign	0	(0)
2018–2020	Utah Royals	21	(2)
2021	Kansas City	0	(0)

International career^{‡}
2003–2020	Canada	206	(19)
Medal record
Women's soccer
Representing Canada
Olympic Games
Bronze medal – third place	2012 London	Team
Bronze medal – third place	2016 Rio de Janeiro	Team
Pan American Games
Gold medal – first place	2011 Guadalajara	Team
Bronze medal – third place	2007 Rio de Janeiro	Team
- * Club domestic league appearances and goals as of July 17, 2020 ‡ National team caps and goals as of March 10, 2020

Diana Beverly Matheson (born April 6, 1984) is a Canadian former professional soccer player who played for the Canada national team from 2003 to 2020 and multiple professional women's teams over the course of her career. She is best known for scoring the bronze medal-winning goal for Canada in the 92nd minute against France at the 2012 Summer Olympics. She also won a bronze medal at the 2016 Rio Olympics and gold medal at the 2011 Pan American Games with the senior national team. Matheson was inducted to the Canada Soccer Hall of Fame in 2025.

After retiring in 2021, Matheson co-founded Project 8 with business partner Tom Gilbert and went on to establish the Northern Super League (NSL), Canada's first domestic professional women's soccer league, which began play in 2025.

== Early life ==
Born in Mississauga, Ontario, Matheson attended White Oaks Secondary School in Oakville, Ontario, where she received the Principal's Award for athletics and academics. As a member of the Ontario provincial team from 1999 to 2002, she won the national championship in 2001 and was runner-up in 2002, captaining the side in her final year. Playing for the Oakville SC women's team, Matheson was a 2002 Ontario Cup champion and club national women's champion.

== College career ==
Matheson majored in economics at Princeton University in Princeton, New Jersey, and was voted Ivy League Player of the Year in 2007 and Princeton Women's Athlete of the Year in 2008.

As a freshman in 2004, Matheson was a unanimous first-team All-Ivy selection and was named Ivy League Rookie of the Year. She earned first-team All-America and first-team All-Mid-Atlantic Region honours and was one of 12 finalists for SoccerBuzz Freshman of the Year. During her sophomore year, she scored five goals, second-most on the team, and recorded a team-high seven assists. As a junior in 2006, Matheson co-captained the squad and led the Tigers with eight goals and five assists despite missing five games to train with the Canadian national team. As a senior, she missed the first seven games to play in the 2007 FIFA Women's World Cup in China, then broke Princeton's single-game and career assist records with a four-assist performance against Rutgers. She finished as Princeton's third four-time first-team all-league honoree and its seventh Player of the Year.

== Club career ==
=== 2003–2006: Early career ===
Matheson began her club career in Canada with the Toronto Inferno in 2003 and the Ottawa Fury from 2004 to 2006. Both clubs were semi-professional, and no fully professional domestic option existed in Canada during her playing career; she would never play professionally in her home country. She was registered with the Inferno while representing Canada at the 2003 FIFA Women's World Cup as a 19-year-old.

Matheson joined the Ottawa Fury of the USL W-League, then the second tier of women's soccer in Canada and the United States, and combined her summers there with her studies at Princeton. The Fury reached the W-League championship final in both 2005 and 2006, losing to the New Jersey Wildcats and the Vancouver Whitecaps respectively, with squads that included more than ten Canadian internationals. Matheson was named to the 2005 W-League Championship All-Tournament team, and the following year was selected as one of four midfielders on the W-League all-league team drawn from the competition's 38 clubs, having recorded a goal and three assists in seven appearances while splitting the summer with national team duty.

=== 2008–2010: Team Strømmen ===
Matheson played the second half of the 2008 season in Norway with Team Strømmen, finishing as a runner-up in both the Toppserien and the national cup competition. She rejoined the club for the 2009 season and for the first half of 2010, before national team duties took her away. She finished her time in Oslo with 32 appearances and 11 goals.

=== 2013–2016: Washington Spirit ===
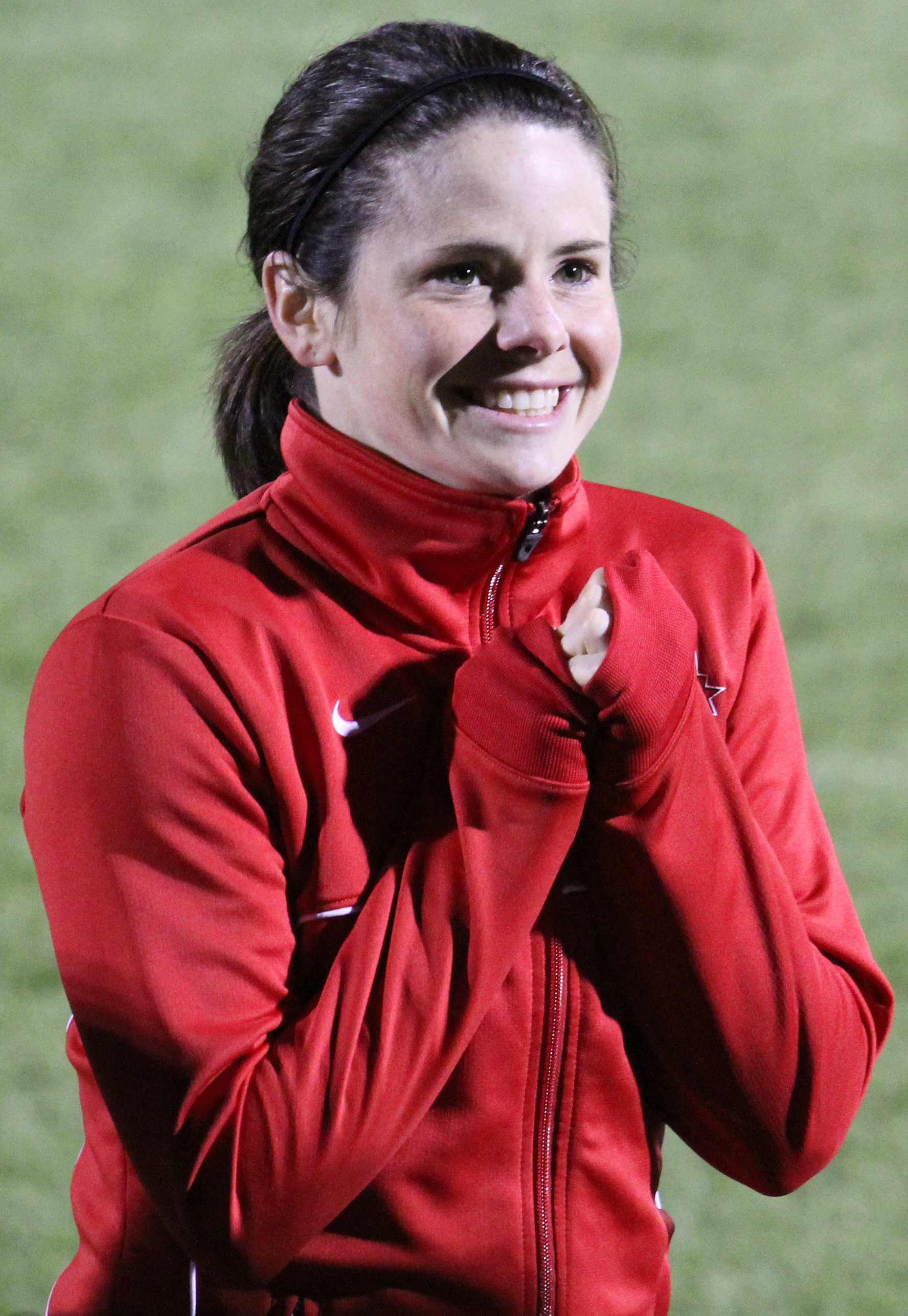
Matheson with the Washington Spirit in 2013

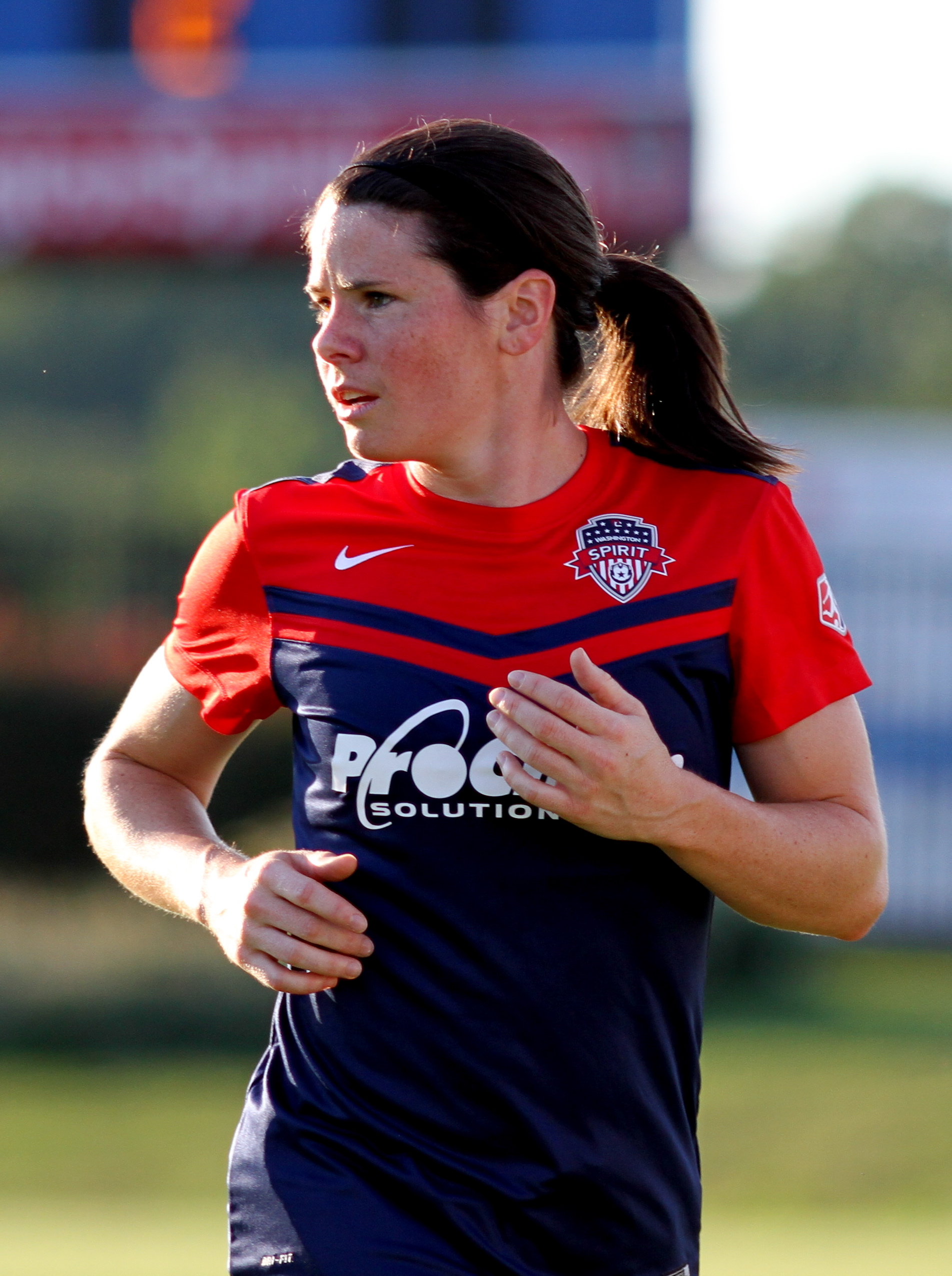
Matheson in 2015

Matheson during her Washington Spirit career

In early 2013, Matheson joined the Washington Spirit through the NWSL Player Allocation ahead of the inaugural season of the National Women's Soccer League. Allocated on January 11, 2013, she was one of seven national team players assigned to the club, alongside compatriot Robyn Gayle and Americans Ashlyn Harris, Ali Krieger and Lori Lindsey. She debuted in the Spirit's first match on April 15, 2013, against the Boston Breakers, and scored her first NWSL goal from a late penalty in the club's home opener against the Western New York Flash on April 20. She added a well-taken goal in the 35th minute of a 2–1 home defeat to Sky Blue FC on April 27.

In August 2013 Matheson became the first Spirit player to be named NWSL Player of the Week, recognised for Week 18 after recording a goal and an assist in consecutive 1–0 home wins over the Chicago Red Stars and Seattle Reign. Her assist on Lupita Worbis's 58th-minute winner against Chicago on August 7 delivered the Spirit's first home victory and snapped a seven-match losing run, and three days later she scored the only goal against Seattle in the 83rd minute, beating goalkeeper Hope Solo from the right side of the area. She finished the campaign with eight goals in 19 appearances as the Spirit's leading scorer, a total that ranked joint-fourth in the league, though the club placed last of eight teams. She was named to the NWSL Best XI First Team at the end of the season.

Matheson helped lead the Spirit to their first playoff berth in 2014, contributing eight goals and six assists. Her tally was second on the team behind Jodie Taylor's eleven as Washington finished fourth on 35 points under head coach Mark Parsons. The season ended with a 2–1 loss at the Seattle Reign in the semi-final on August 23, 2014. After joining the team late in 2015 due to injury and World Cup duty, she scored three goals with two assists in nine games. Her absence stemmed from a torn left anterior cruciate ligament sustained in an October 2014 friendly against Japan, compounded by a fractured fifth metatarsal in her right foot in March 2015 that required surgery. The Spirit again placed fourth and again lost a semi-final at Seattle, going down 3–0 on September 13, 2015. She added four goals in 2016, starting nine of the twelve matches she played, and holds the Spirit's all-time records for goals (23) and assists (12). Among them was a 77th-minute header from an Estefanía Banini cross in a 2–1 defeat to Sky Blue FC on June 25. A stoppage-time goal by Francisca Ordega beat the Chicago Red Stars 2–1 in the semi-final, sending the club to its first NWSL final in four years of existence. In the 2016 NWSL Championship against the Western New York Flash, with the match tied 2–2 after extra time, Matheson's penalty in the shootout was saved by Sabrina D'Angelo, securing the title for the Flash. Crystal Dunn scored both Spirit goals before Lynn Williams equalised in the 124th minute, and D'Angelo's stop against Matheson was her third of the shootout after denials of Krieger and Tori Huster in the first penalty shootout in league history.

In January 2017, Matheson was traded to the Seattle Reign in exchange for Arielle Ship and a third-round pick in the 2018 NWSL College Draft.

=== 2017: Seattle Reign ===
Matheson tore her ACL while training with the Canadian national team in February 2017 and missed the entire season. She never appeared in a match for Seattle, and was traded to the Utah Royals at the 2018 draft in exchange for Yael Averbuch and a third-round pick.

=== 2018–2020: Utah Royals ===
Matheson appeared in 21 matches and scored twice for Utah in 2018, starting 18 of them. She provided the club's first assist in its history against the Orlando Pride in March, and her first goal for Utah, scored in May against her former club Washington, was voted the league's Goal of the Week. A foot injury sustained with the national team required surgery and cost her the 2019 season. The surgery repaired an avulsion fracture in her left foot, in which a toe ligament had pulled away a fragment of bone that was pressing on a nerve and causing persistent pain.

She returned for the 2020 NWSL Challenge Cup, scoring in the 35th minute of Utah's opening match against the Houston Dash on June 30, 2020, from an Amy Rodriguez cross. It was her first NWSL goal since June 2018, and the match finished 3–3 after Utah recovered from a two-goal deficit. Utah were eliminated by Houston on penalties in the quarterfinals.

=== 2021: Kansas City ===
The Utah franchise was dissolved on December 7, 2020, after owner Dell Loy Hansen put the club up for sale, and its player contracts and franchise rights were transferred to a new majority-women-owned expansion team provisionally called Kansas City NWSL, later the Kansas City Current. Matheson never appeared for the new club, retiring in July 2021 before playing a match for them.

== International career ==
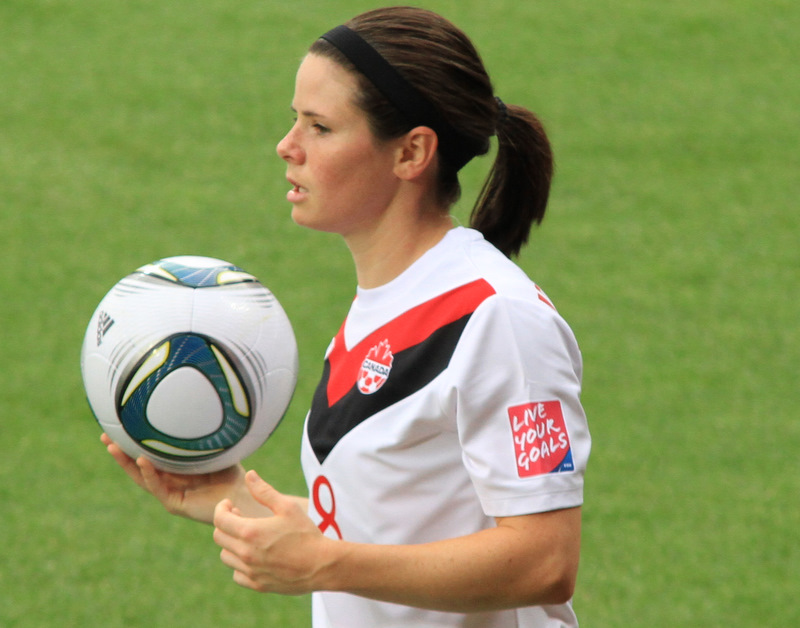
Matheson at the 2011 FIFA Women's World Cup

Standing 1.53 m (5 ft 0 in), Matheson was noted for the pace and technical quality that allowed her to hold a place in a Canadian side known for its physicality. She made her national team debut at the Algarve Cup in March 2003. She was 18 at the time and deferred her admission to Princeton in order to take up the call-up. She scored her first international goal on June 15, 2003, against Mexico.

Matheson was named to Canada's squad for the 2003 FIFA Women's World Cup as a teenager. In the quarterfinal against China, she delivered the left-footed cross from a counter-attack that captain Charmaine Hooper headed in during the seventh minute, the only goal in a 1–0 upset of the fourth-ranked Chinese. The result carried Canada into a World Cup semifinal for the first time, and they finished fourth after two late goals by Sweden in the semifinal — still the country's best finish at the tournament.

In 2006, Matheson became the 14th Canadian woman to reach 50 caps, and she played a then-national-record 45 consecutive matches between 2003 and 2006. At the 2007 World Cup she appeared in all three group-stage matches as Canada failed to advance, and in 2008 she played all four matches at her first Olympic Games, where Canada were eliminated in the quarterfinals by the United States. She won six CONCACAF medals with Canada over her career, including a silver at the 2006 qualifying tournament and the 2010 continental title.

Canada again exited at the group stage of the 2011 World Cup. At the 2011 Pan American Games, Matheson took and converted Canada's first penalty in a shootout victory over defending champions Brazil, securing the country's first Pan American gold in the sport.

Matheson played every minute of Canada's six matches at the 2012 Olympics. After a last-minute extra-time defeat to the United States in the semifinals, she scored in the 92nd minute of the bronze medal match to beat France 1–0 and deliver Canada's first Olympic medal in women's soccer.

In October 2014, Matheson tore an ACL in a friendly against Japan, putting her participation in the home 2015 World Cup in doubt. She recovered in time to make the squad and came off the bench for the final 28 minutes of Canada's quarterfinal loss to England, her only appearance of the tournament and a comeback later cited as emblematic of her durability. It was the fourth of her four World Cup appearances.

Matheson won a second consecutive Olympic bronze at the 2016 Games, and earned her 200th cap on October 14, 2018, becoming only the second woman in the world to reach that figure. A foot injury requiring surgery ruled her out of the 2019 World Cup. Her final appearance came on March 10, 2020, against Brazil at the 2020 Tournoi de France, a match in which she also scored, making her the second Canadian to score international goals in three different decades.

In July 2021, Matheson announced her retirement. The lingering foot injury had ruled her out of the Tokyo Olympics, and she cited the accumulated physical toll as her reason for stopping. She finished with 206 caps, 193 starts, 16,715 minutes, 19 goals, and 25 assists, including 11 starts as captain, ranking second in Canadian history in matches, starts, minutes, and goals at the time she left the national team. Her 25 assists ranked tied for second-most in the program's history at the time of her retirement.

== Post-playing career ==
Alongside her economics degree from Princeton, Matheson later completed an MBA and a graduate programme run by UEFA, a combination of business training and playing experience that shaped her approach to league-building.

In December 2022, Matheson and business partner Thomas Gilbert announced plans for a professional women's soccer league in Canada. Their organisation, Project 8, served as the precursor to the Northern Super League. Canada had for decades ranked among FIFA's top ten women's national teams while remaining the only country in that group without a domestic league of its own.

Matheson has described the league as designed around player protections from the outset, with those commitments written into its standard player contracts. NSL players receive a share of revenue from replica kit sales, along with mental health and maternity benefits, guaranteed contract terms, and protection from being traded without their consent — provisions Matheson has characterised as long-standing bargaining objectives for players in the NWSL, where she ended her own career. She has framed the revenue-sharing arrangement as a minimum standard rather than an achievement in itself, calling it "table stakes." Gilbert, who subsequently became chief executive of Ottawa Rapid FC, said Matheson researched international practice and consulted players across the country before a framework was agreed and passed to the clubs.

The league played its first match on April 16, 2025, when more than 14,000 spectators at BC Place watched Vancouver Rise FC host Calgary Wild FC, with Matheson in attendance alongside former teammates Stephanie Labbé and Christine Sinclair. Matheson has noted that the NSL is, so far as she is aware, the only first-tier league in the world established by former players, and has said its structure allows the league to bypass the adversarial dynamic players often expect when raising concerns with management. She described Quinn's penalty in that opening match — the first goal in league history — as "poetic."

Her work establishing the league is profiled in Michèle Hozer's 2025 documentary The Pitch. The league's championship trophy, the Diana B. Matheson Cup, is named in her honour.

== Personal life ==
Matheson married Anastasia Bucsis on September 3, 2023.

== Career statistics ==
=== International goals ===
Key (expand for notes on "international goals" and sorting)
Location	Geographic location of the venue where the competition occurred Sorted by country name first, then by city name
Lineup	Start – played entire match on minute (off player) – substituted on at the minute indicated, and player was substituted off at the same time off minute (on player) – substituted off at the minute indicated, and player was substituted on at the same time (c) – captain Sorted by minutes played
#	NumberOfGoals.goalNumber scored by the player in the match (alternate notation to Goal in match)
Min	The minute in the match the goal was scored. For list that include caps, blank indicates played in the match but did not score a goal.
Assist/pass	The ball was passed by the player, which assisted in scoring the goal. This column depends on the availability and source of this information.
penalty or pk	Goal scored on penalty-kick which was awarded due to foul by opponent. (Goals scored in penalty-shoot-out, at the end of a tied match after extra-time, are not included.)
Score	The match score after the goal was scored. Sorted by goal difference, then by goal scored by the player's team
Result	The final score. Sorted by goal difference in the match, then by goal difference in penalty-shoot-out if it is taken, followed by goal scored by the player's team in the match, then by goal scored in the penalty-shoot-out. For matches with identical final scores, match ending in extra-time without penalty-shoot-out is a tougher match, therefore precede matches that ended in regulation
aet	The score at the end of extra-time; the match was tied at the end of 90' regulation
pso	Penalty-shoot-out score shown in parentheses; the match was tied at the end of extra-time
	Green background color – exhibition or closed door international friendly match
	Yellow background color – match at an invitational tournament
	Orange background color – Continental Games or regional tournament
	Pink background color – Olympic women's football tournament
NOTE on background colors: Continental Games or regional tournament are sometimes also qualifier for World Cup or Olympics; information depends on the source such as the player's federation. NOTE: some keys may not apply for a particular football player

Goal	Date	Location	Opponent	Lineup	#	Min	Score	Result	Competition
1	2003-06-15	Mazatlan, Mexico	Mexico	Start	1.1	90	3–0	3–0	Friendly
2	2007-05-06	Nanjing, China	China	Start	1.1	30	1–2	1–2	Friendly
3	2007-07-14	Rio, Brazil	Uruguay	on 46' (off Lang)	1.1	53	3–0	7–0	Pan American Games
4	2008-06-14	Suwon, South Korea	Argentina	Start	1.1	25	1–0	5–0	Peace Queen Cup
5	2010-02-20	Larnaka, Cyprus	Poland	off 56' (on Gayle)	1.1	45	3–0	3–0	Friendly
6	2010-03-03	Nicosia, Cyprus	New Zealand	Start	1.1	71	1–0	1–0	Cyprus Cup
7	2010-09-30	Toronto, Canada	China	off 85' (on McCalla)	1.1	23	1–0	3–1	Friendly
8	2010-12-09	São Paulo, Brazil	Netherlands	Start	2.1	55	3–0	5–0	Torneio Internacional
9	2010-12-09	São Paulo, Brazil	Netherlands	Start	2.2	67	4–0	5–0	Torneio Internacional
10	2011-06-07	Telki, Hungary	Hungary	Start	1.1	87	1–0	1–0	Friendly
11	2012-07-14	Châtel-Saint-Denis, Switzerland	New Zealand	off 79' (on Timko)	1.1	30	1–0	2–0	Friendly
12	2012-08-09	Coventry, UK	France	Start	1.1	92	1–0	1–0	Olympic tournament
13	2013-03-06	Larnaka, Cyprus	Switzerland	Start	1.1	79	2–0	2–0	Cyprus Cup
14	2014-03-07	Larnaka, Cyprus	Italy	Start	1.1	33	1–0	3–1	Cyprus Cup
15	2014-03-12	Nicosia, Cyprus	Republic of Ireland	Start	1.1	56	1–1	2–1	Cyprus Cup
16	2015-12-13	Natal, Brazil	Trinidad	Start	1.1	10	1–0	4–0	International Tournament
17	2016-02-14	Houston, USA	Trinidad	Start	1.1	24	1–0	6–0	Olympic qualifier: Group B
18	2018-10-08	Edinburg, USA	Cuba	Start	1.1	72	12–0	12–0	CONCACAF Women's Championship
19	2020-03-10	Calais, France	Brazil	on 53' (off Riviere)	1.1	74	1–2	2–2	Tournoi de France

== Honours ==
Oakville SC

- Jubilee Trophy: 2002
- Ontario Cup: 2002

Ottawa Fury

- USL W-League runner-up: 2005, 2006

Team Strømmen

- Toppserien runner-up: 2008
- Norwegian Women's Cup runner-up: 2008

Washington Spirit

- NWSL Championship runner-up: 2016

Canada

- Olympic Games bronze medal: 2012, 2016
- CONCACAF Women's Championship: 2010
- Pan American Games gold medal: 2011
- Pan American Games bronze medal: 2007

Ontario

- Canada Games: 2001
- Canada Soccer National Championships: 2002

Princeton Tigers

- Ivy League Women's Soccer Player of the Year: 2007
- Ivy League Rookie of the Year: 2004
- First-team All-Ivy: 2004, 2005, 2006, 2007
- NSCAA first-team All-American: 2004
- Princeton Women's Athlete of the Year: 2008

Individual

- NWSL Best XI: 2013
- Washington Spirit Team Most Valuable Player: 2013
- Canada Soccer All-Time Canada XI Women's Team: 2012
- Canada Soccer Centennial Timeline Top 30 Women's Footballers: 2012

Orders, recognition and halls of fame

- Queen Elizabeth II Diamond Jubilee Medal: 2012
- Diana Matheson Way, a street in Oakville, Ontario, named in her honour: 2017
- Canadian Olympic Hall of Fame, as a member of the London 2012 team: 2019
- Canada Soccer Hall of Fame: 2025
- Canada Soccer President's Award: 2025
- Canada Games Hall of Honour: 2025

== See also ==
- List of women's footballers with 100 or more caps
- List of Princeton University Olympians
- List of Olympic medalists in football
- List of 2016 Summer Olympics medal winners
- List of 2012 Summer Olympics medal winners
- List of players who have appeared in multiple FIFA Women's World Cups
- List of 2011 Pan American Games medal winners
