= Ingrid Wells =

American soccer player

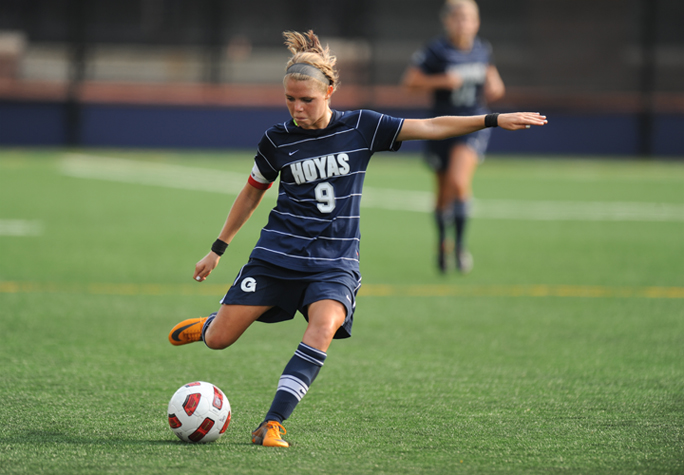
- Ingrid Wells playing for the Georgetown Hoyas

Personal information
- Full name: Ingrid Kirsten Wells
- Date of birth: March 29, 1989 (age 37)
- Place of birth: New York City, New York, United States
- Height: 5 ft 2 in (1.57 m)
- Position: Midfielder

College career
Years	Team	Apps	(Gls)
2007–2011	Georgetown Hoyas		

Senior career*
Years	Team	Apps	(Gls)
2012	Göteborg FC		
2013	Washington Spirit	8	(0)
2013	Western New York Flash	10	(0)
2013–2015	1. FFC Turbine Potsdam		

International career
2007–2008	United States U-20		
2009–2011	United States U-23		
- * Club domestic league appearances and goals

Ingrid Kirsten Wells (born March 29, 1989) is an American professional soccer player from Montclair, New Jersey. Nicknamed "the Little General", Wells was a midfielder for the Georgetown Hoyas women's soccer team as well as various levels of the USWNT. She previously played in the National Women's Soccer League (NWSL) for the Western New York Flash and Washington Spirit, Sweden's Göteborg FC in the Damallsvenskan, 1. FFC Turbine Potsdam in the German Frauen-Bundesliga, and was captain of the United States U-23 women's national soccer team from 2010 to 2012. She retired from her soccer career to pursue a career in public health nutrition at the end of the 2015 season.

== Early life ==
Wells attended Montclair High School for all four years of her high school career, and was captain of the Mounties' varsity squad during her junior and senior years. She was the New Jersey Gatorade Player of the Year and the Star Ledger Player of the Year in 2007. Wells was regarded as one of the top 50 incoming freshman in the nation by SoccerBuzz. The 2006–07 New Jersey Gatorade Player of the Year is a past member of the U.S. National Pool, a three-time Region One ODP team member and a member of the N.J. ODP Program. An NSCAA All-American, Wells was named New Jersey Star Ledger High School Player of the Year and First Team All-State. Wells was also a member of the U18 Parsippany Gazelles, a team on the East Coast.

== College career ==
During her first year at Georgetown, in which she started every game, Wells scored six goals and dished out 13 assists, tying Georgetown's single-season record for assists. Wells also earned many accolades such as being the BIG EAST Rookie of the Year, First Team All-BIG EAST, NSCAA/Adidas National All-American, Regional All-American, SoccerBuzz Magazine National All-American, National Freshman All-American, Regional All-American and Regional Rookie of the Year.

In 2008, Wells redshirted her sophomore year to play for the United States U-20 women's national soccer team in the 2008 FIFA U-20 Women's World Cup. By the end of the 2009 season, Wells was ranked second all-time in assists (24) for the Hoyas. She had also been named to the Preseason M.A.C Hermann Trophy Watch List. During her sophomore year for the Hoyas, Wells started all 20 games and once again earned many accolades such as an All-BIG EAST First Team selection, named an Honorable Mention All-American by TopDrawerSoccer.com, selected to the BIG EAST Academic Honor Roll, and was an ECAC Division I Women's Soccer All-Star. She was ranked first in the BIG EAST with 11 assists and was third in the league with 25 points, and fourth in the league with 1.25 points per game. Her point total matched her output from her freshman campaign in 2007, which was one point shy of the school single-season record. By the end of the season she ranked second all-time in assists (24) and eighth all-time in points (50).

In her third year for the Hoyas, Wells once again started in all 24 games. She earned the honors of being the BIG EAST Midfielder of the Year, an All-BIG EAST First Team selection for the third time in her career, an NSCAA All-Northeast Region First Team selection, a First Team All-American by the National Soccer Coaches Association of America, a BIG EAST Academic All-Star, and was named one of 15 finalists for the Missouri Athletic Club's Hermann Trophy, recognizing the top player in college soccer. She trained during the second half of the year with the United States Under-23 National Team. Wells led the Hoyas into the 2010 College Cup; Georgetown was knocked out by Ohio State in the quarterfinals. Georgetown head coach Dave Nolan remarked, "I thought Ingrid was tremendous tonight, she was the best player on the field, [but to win] you probably need to have eight or nine of your players show up and have great games, and I don't think we got that."

Following her red shirt senior season, Wells went directly to train with the United States women's national soccer team before moving to Sweden to play professionally. During her time at Georgetown, she became the first soccer player (woman or man) at Georgetown to score 100 points during their career.

== Club career ==
=== Göteborg FC, 2012 ===
During the 2012 season, Wells played for the Swedish club Göteborg FC in the Damallsvenskan. She made 19 appearances with nine starts for the club for a total of 862 minutes. The team won the Svenska Cupen Women and was runner-up at the Super Cup Women.

=== NWSL: Washington Spirit and Western New York Flash, 2013 ===
In 2013, Wells signed with the Washington Spirit for the inaugural season of the NWSL. Of the signing, Wells said, "It's an honor to get the opportunity to play for the Spirit. I'm excited to be playing in DC again as it is a strong soccer community and am really looking forward to the start of the season!" Wells made eight appearances and starts for the club playing a total of 549 minutes. On June 20, 2013, it was announced that she had been waived by the Spirit, after informing the team of her intention to sign with a Frauen-Bundesliga club for the following season, in accordance with league rules. She later signed with the Western New York Flash who won the regular league title and were runners-up for the inaugural NWSL championship title. Wells made ten appearances for the Flash.

=== 1. FFC Turbine Potsdam, 2013 ===
Wells joined German Frauen-Bundesliga club 1. FFC Turbine Potsdam in August 2013.

== International career ==
Wells was a member of the United States U-20 women's national soccer team, which won the 2008 FIFA U-20 Women's World Cup in Chile. She played in five matches, starting in four which included the final match where the United States defeated North Korea, 2–1.

Wells was also a regular with the United States U-23 women's national soccer team and USWNT. She retired from soccer to pursue a career in nutrition at the end of the 2015 season, enrolling in NYU's College of Global Public Health's Master Public Health nutrition program, and gained her master's degree two years later.

== Honors ==
Western New York Flash

- NWSL Shield: 2013

Individual

- 2011 NSCAA/Adidas National All-American - 1st Team
- 2010 NSCAA/Adidas National All-American - 1st Team
- 2007 NSCAA/Adidas National All-American - 2nd Team
- 2011 BIG EAST Midfielder of the Year
- 2010 BIG EAST Midfielder of the Year
- 2007, 2009, 2010, 2011 First Team All-BIG EAST
- 2007 BIG EAST Rookie of the Year
- 2007 SoccerBuzz Magazine National All-American
- 2007 National Freshman All-American
- 2007 Regional All-American and Regional Rookie of the Year
- 2009 ECAC Division I Women's Soccer All-Star
- 2009 BIG EAST Academic Honor Roll
- 2011, 2010 Missouri Athletic Club's Hermann Trophy finalist
- 2006-07 New Jersey Gatorade Player of the Year
