= Holly King (soccer) =

American soccer player and coach

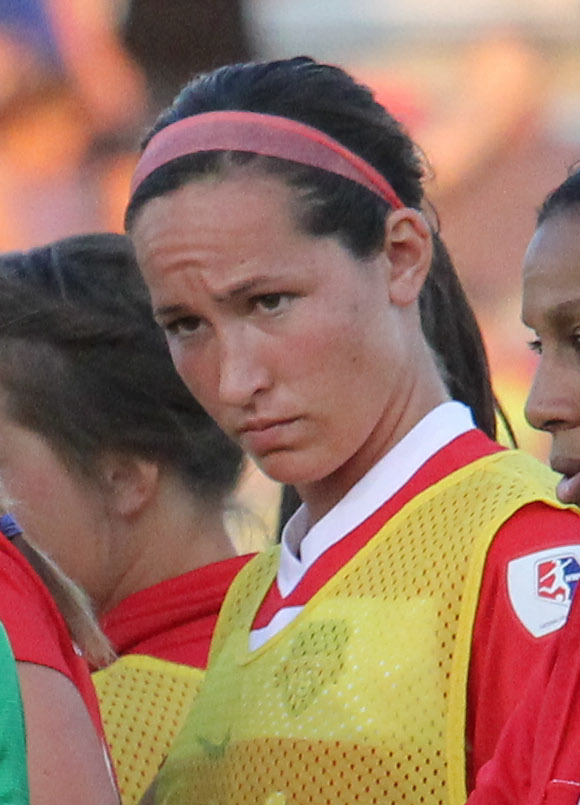

Personal information
- Full name: Holly Elizabeth King
- Date of birth: March 13, 1991 (age 35)
- Place of birth: Ashburn, Virginia
- Height: 5 ft 9 in (1.75 m)
- Position: Midfielder

Team information
- Current team: Washington Spirit
- Number: 20

Youth career
- 2012: D.C. United Women

College career
Years	Team	Apps	(Gls)
2009–2012	Florida Gators		

Senior career*
Years	Team	Apps	(Gls)
2013	Washington Spirit	14	(0)
- Colorado Pride
2018	SKN St. Pölten		
- * Club domestic league appearances and goals as of August 2, 2013

Holly Elizabeth King (born March 13, 1991) is an American soccer midfielder currently playing for the Colorado Pride in the W-League (USL). She previously played for the Washington Spirit in the National Women's Soccer League.

King is currently the head coach of the girls' soccer team at Heritage High School in Leesburg, Virginia. In her first season at the helm, the Pride played in their first state championship game against crosstown rivals Loudoun County, but fell 3–1. She also coached four VHSL 4A All-State players.

== Early life ==
Raised in Ashburn, Virginia, King attended Broad Run High School where she was state, region and district Player of the Year for 2008 and 2009. In 2009, she was named Washington Post All-Metro Player of the Year and Loudoun Times Athlete of the Year. She was also named to the NSCAA/adidas High School All-Region III, EA Sports All-America team, and ESPN RISE Spring Soccer All-America first team the same year. She was named to the all-district, all-region and all-state first team from 2006 to 2009. She helped lead the team as 2008 and 2009 Virginia High School League Group AA District II, Region II and State champions with a record of 47–0–1. In 2009, she was listed among the top 30 soccer recruits in the nation by ESPN RISE Magazine and Top Drawer Soccer.

King was a member of the Regional I Olympic Development Program (ODP) team. From 2006 to 2008, she toured Italy with the team. In 2008, she captained the Loudoun Soccer Club Hotshots team that ranked in the top 10 in the nation. The team were state finalists in 2006 and state semi-finalists in 2005, 2007 and 2008.

=== University of Florida Gators ===
King attended the University of Florida where she played for coach Becky Burleigh's Florida Gators women's soccer team from 2009 to 2012. As a senior in 2012, she started every match as a holding midfielder and ranked fifth among the team with a career season-high 14 points. She earned 2012 All-America and Academic All-America, SEC Defensive Player of the Year, and All-SEC first team honors. In 2011, she was named Academic All-America and All-SEC.

== Playing career ==
=== Club ===
==== Washington Spirit ====
In February 2013, King was selected in the third round (19th overall) of the 2013 NWSL College Draft by the Washington Spirit for the inaugural season of the National Women's Soccer League.
