= Caroline Miller (soccer) =

American soccer player

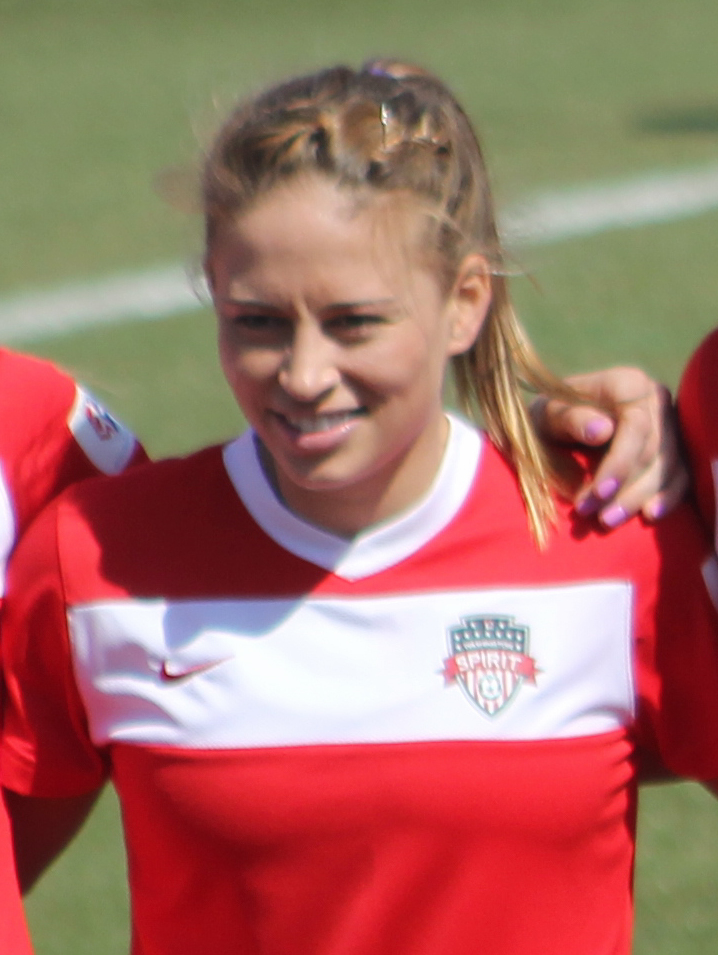

Personal information
- Full name: Caroline Shannon Miller
- Date of birth: July 16, 1991 (age 35)
- Place of birth: Maryland, United States
- Height: 5 ft 5 in (1.65 m)
- Position: Forward

College career
Years	Team	Apps	(Gls)
2009–2012	Virginia Cavaliers		

Senior career*
Years	Team	Apps	(Gls)
2013–2015	Washington Spirit	9	(0)
2015	Östersunds DFF	8	(4)
- * Club domestic league appearances and goals

Caroline Shannon Miller (born July 16, 1991) is an American professional soccer forward. She has represented the United States at the U-16, U-17, and U-20 levels.

== Early life ==
Miller grew up in Rockville, Maryland and attended Walter Johnson High School, where she broke the school scoring record by 50. She was named the Gatorade State Player of the Year in 2008 and 2009, was a three-time first-team Washington Post All-Met, and three-time first-team All-State. As a senior, she scored 29 goals, setting another school record, and was ranked the number 24 college recruit by Top Drawer Soccer.

Miller also played for the club team, McLean Freedom, and helped lead the team to clinch the 2007 National Championship.

=== University of Virginia ===
Miller attended the University of Virginia, where she set single-season school records with 20 goals and 47 points during the 2012 season. She was named 2012 Atlantic Coast Conference Offensive Player of the Year and was the conference leader in goals and points. She was one of just four players nationally to reach the 20-goal mark during the season, and the first from the Atlantic Coast Conference in four years to accomplish the feat. A 2012 NSCAA first-team All-American and Hermann Trophy finalist, Miller ended her season on an eight-game goal scoring streak, scoring 11 goals against eight opponents, a school record. A two-time ACC Player of the Week, Miller was named first-team All-ACC for the second consecutive season and was named to the ACC All-Tournament team as the Cavaliers won the 2012 Atlantic Coast Conference Championship.

== Club career ==
=== Washington Spirit, 2013–2015 ===
On January 18, 2013, Miller was drafted to the Washington Spirit in the second round (10th pick overall) of the 2013 NWSL College Draft for the inaugural season of the National Women's Soccer League. Miller said of the draft, "I am so excited to be selected by my hometown team. I have wanted to play professionally since I was a little girl and now I have the chance to do so. I am thankful for my time at UVa and the support I have gotten from everyone there. They are the reason I have this opportunity." Caroline was waived from the Washington Spirit on May 28, 2015.

== International career ==
Miller previously played on the United States Women's U-16, U-17 and U-20 soccer teams.
