= Colleen Williams (soccer) =

American soccer player

Personal information
- Full name: Colleen Williams
- Date of birth: April 5, 1991 (age 35)
- Place of birth: Titusville, New Jersey, United States
- Height: 5 ft 5 in (1.65 m)
- Positions: Midfielder; forward

College career
Years	Team	Apps	(Gls)
2009–2012	Dayton Flyers		

Senior career*
Years	Team	Apps	(Gls)
2013	Washington Spirit	6	(0)

International career
2013	United States U23	2	
- * Club domestic league appearances and goals

Colleen Williams (born April 5, 1991) is an American former soccer forward and midfielder who played for the University of Dayton from 2009 to 2012, the United States under-23 women's national soccer team in 2013, and the Washington Spirit in the National Women's Soccer League (NWSL) in 2013.

== Early life ==
Born to David and Theresa Williams, Colleen was raised in Titusville, New Jersey, where she attended Hopewell Valley Central High School and led the soccer team to back-to-back Prep A State Championships in 2005 and 2006. As a senior at the school, she scored 25 goals and tallied 19 assists. A four-year starter, she finished her high school career having scored 51 goals, tallied 46 assists for 148 points. She was named the 2008 Patriot League Player of the Year, Mercer County Player of the Year, First Team all-state and First Team All-CVC.

Williams led her club team, FC Bucks Vipers, to the U-18 US Youth Soccer National Championship as well as six Pennsylvania State Cup Championships from 2002 to 2008. Williams also competed in three National Championships, winning the title with the New Jersey Olympic Development Program (ODP) team in 2006. In 2005, she was a member of the U.S. National Youth Pool.

=== University of Dayton Flyers ===
Williams attended the University of Dayton where she played for the Flyers from 2009 to 2012. She set a number of records during her four years at the college, including top scorer with 58 goals. She is Dayton's all-time leader in assists and points as well as the record holder in single-season assists. She was a two-time NCAA All American and was listed on the Hermann Trophy Watch List twice. Williams became the 20th player in NCAA women's soccer history to score over 50 goals and 50 assists. She scored 58 goals and had 52 assists during her college career.

== Club career ==
In February 2013, Williams was selected in the fourth round (26th overall) of the 2013 NWSL College Draft by the Washington Spirit for the inaugural season of the National Women's Soccer League. She played in six games before suffering a knee injury on July 6 that sidelined her for the rest of the season.

On May 21, 2014, Williams was waived by the Spirit. At a try out with Sky Blue FC she suffered a recurrence of the knee injury. On February 8, 2015, she officially retired from professional soccer.

== International career ==
Williams represented the United States as a member of the United States under-23 women's national soccer team in 2013. She played in two games in March 2013 at the 4 Nations Tournament in La Manga, Spain.
