= Lupita Worbis =

Mexican footballer (born 1983)

Personal information
- Full name: Teresa Guadalupe Worbis Aguilar
- Date of birth: 12 December 1983 (age 42)
- Place of birth: Mérida, Yucatán, Mexico
- Height: 1.65 m (5 ft 5 in)
- Position: Forward

Team information
- Current team: Cruz Azul (women) (assistant coach)

Senior career*
Years	Team	Apps	(Gls)
- Borregos Salvajes
- F.C. Indiana
2013	Washington Spirit	11	(1)
2020–2022	Puebla	56	(10)

International career
2002	Mexico U-19	3	(3)
2003–2013	Mexico	115	(20)

Managerial career
- 2023–2024: Necaxa U-19 (women)
- 2025: Necaxa (women)
- 2026–: Cruz Azul (women) (assistant coach)
- 2026: Cruz Azul (women) (interim)
- * Club domestic league appearances and goals

Teresa Guadalupe "Lupita" Worbis Aguilar (born 12 December 1983) is a Mexican architect and a former footballer who played as a midfielder. She was a member of the Mexico women's national team. She is the current assistant coach of Liga Femenil club Cruz Azul.

== Early life ==
Worbis completed her undergraduate degree in architecture at the Monterrey Institute of Technology and Higher Education in Puebla, Mexico.

== Club career ==
On 11 January 2013 Worbis joined Washington Spirit for the inaugural season of the National Women's Soccer League as part of the NWSL Player Allocation. She made eleven appearances for the Spirit and scored one goal.

== International career ==
Worbis competed for Mexico at the 2004 Summer Olympics in Athens, Greece, where the team finished in 8th place.
