= Washington Spirit =

American professional women's soccer team

- Founded: 2012; 14 years ago as D.C. United Women
- Stadium: Audi Field Washington, D.C.
- Capacity: 20,000
- Owner: Michele Kang
- President of Soccer Operations: Haley Carter
- Head coach: Adrián González
- League: National Women's Soccer League
- 2025: Regular season: 2nd of 14 Playoffs: Runners-up
- Website: washingtonspirit.com
Home colors	Away colors

The Washington Spirit are an American professional soccer team based in Washington, D.C. that competes in the National Women's Soccer League (NWSL). It is a continuation of the D.C. United Women of the W-League and continues to field both an amateur Women's Premier Soccer League (WPSL) team and a youth team, both under the Spirit name. The team has reached the NWSL Championship five times (2016, 2021, 2024, 2025, and 2026), winning once in 2021.

== History ==
=== Establishment ===
The foundation of the National Women's Soccer League was announced on November 21, 2012, with Washington selected as a host for one of the eight teams selected for the inaugural season. In December 2012, the team's name was announced as the Washington Spirit. D.C. United Women head coach Mike Jorden was kept on as well as assistant coach Cindi Harkes. Bill Lynch was the Spirit's inaugural owner for the National Women's Soccer League launch in 2013.

=== Inaugural season ===
On January 11, 2013, as part of the NWSL player allocation, goalkeeper Ashlyn Harris (USA), defender Ali Krieger (USA), midfielder Lori Lindsey (USA), defender Robyn Gayle (CAN), midfielder Diana Matheson (CAN), defender Alina Garciamendez (MEX) and midfielder Teresa Worbis (MEX) were named to the team. During the February 7, 2013 NWSL Supplemental Draft, the team selected Stephanie Ochs, Tori Huster, Jordan Angeli, Natasha Kai, Megan Mischler and Heather Cooke.

The Spirit played their first competitive match on April 14, 2013, drawing Boston Breakers 1–1 with Tiffany McCarty scoring the team's first goal assisted by Stephanie Ochs.

The inaugural season saw the Spirit stumble out of the gate under Mike Jorden, who was fired after the first eleven games having won only once in that time. Jorden was replaced by Mark Parsons, who finished the season in 8th (last) place registering only 2 more wins over the season.

=== 2014–2016 successes ===
After a poor inaugural season, the Spirit would much improve in the 2014 season by making some key acquisitions, including Jodie Taylor and Christine Nairn who would both finish as the team's top scorers with 11 and 8 goals respectively. Finishing 4th, the Spirit made their first NWSL Playoff appearance. They would lose to Seattle Reign.

The Spirit finished the 2015 season with a record of 8–6–6 and repeating their 4th place league position. The playoff result, again, ended in an away loss to Seattle in the semifinals. The season would be the breakout year for Crystal Dunn, who was awarded the 2015 NWSL Golden Boot Award, scoring 15 goals during the campaign. At the conclusion of the season, Mark Parsons stepped down as head coach and general manager to take over as coach of Portland Thorns FC.

Building off the successes of the 2014 and 2015 seasons, the Spirit hired former Sky Blue FC head coach Jim Gabarra ahead of the 2016 season. The Spirit had their most successful season to date in 2016, being league leaders in the standings throughout most of the season. Only in the final week would the Spirit's loss finalize them as league runners-up. Earning their first post-season victory against Chicago Red Stars, the Spirit would lose the 2016 NWSL Final in penalties to Western New York Flash.

=== 2017–2021 ===
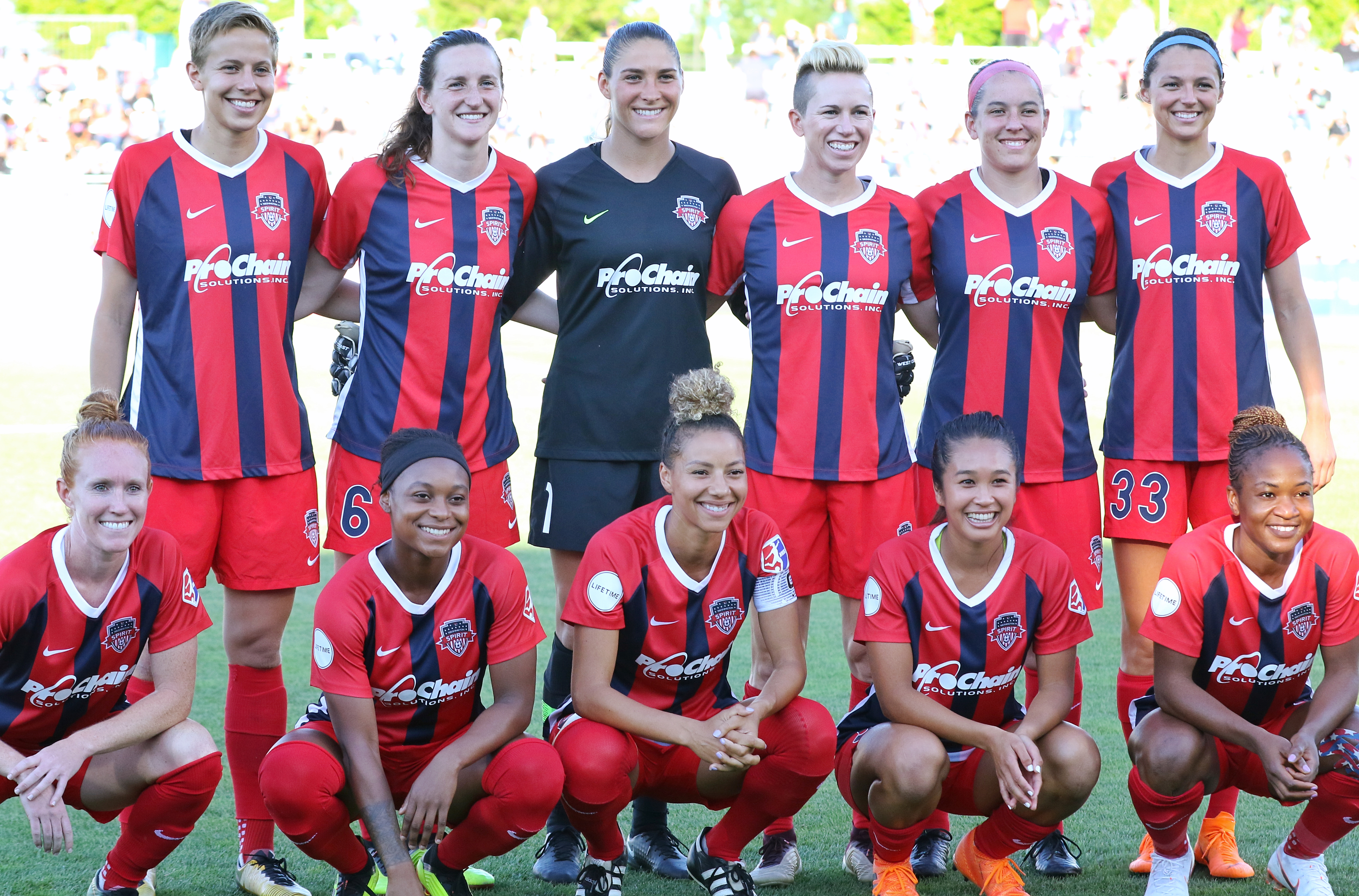
The Spirit line up in June 2018.

In the aftermath of finishing 2016 runners-up, the Spirit saw a series of key departures including captain Ali Krieger (traded to Orlando Pride), Christine Nairn and Diana Matheson (both traded to Seattle Reign), and Crystal Dunn leaving for Chelsea, while retaining her contracting rights. Unable to adequately replace these players, the Spirit struggled to compete throughout the 2017 season ultimately finishing last (10th) for the first time since the inaugural season. However, building for the future, Gabarra was able to recruit U.S. national team prospect Mallory Pugh mid-season. Pugh would go on to lead the team in scoring, registering 6 goals in 16 games. The 2018 season continued the Spirit's pursuit of young talent, but also continued the struggle for results. On August 21, after eight straight losses and being eliminated from playoff contention, the Spirit fired head coach Jim Gabarra and appointed assistant coach Tom Torres as interim head coach. Torres led the Spirit through the final three matches of the season at home, including the Spirit's debut at the newly opened Audi Field against Portland Thorns FC on August 25. The match set a new club record for home attendance with 7,976 fans. The season ended with the Spirit finishing in 8th place, just ahead of Sky Blue FC. During the offseason, the Spirit appointed Richie Burke as the new head coach while retaining Torres on the technical staff. The announcement also noted local tech executive Steve Baldwin had become the Spirit's new majority owner.

The 2019 Washington Spirit season marked several changes for the Spirit organization. Owner Steve Baldwin outlined several planned improvements including theme nights for fans, pride night, a gear store in the stadium, and a mascot. The 2019 season also featured major changes on the field; fifteen new players were added to the Spirit roster including Australian national team members Chloe Logarzo and Amy Harrison. The Spirit surpassed their point total from the previous season on May 18 after the 5th game of the season against Portland Thorns FC. They would go on to surpass their past season's point total the next week against the Chicago Red Stars. They ultimately finished 5th in the 2019 NWSL standings.

In September 2021, Burke was fired as head coach following an investigation into allegations of harassment and abusive behavior toward players. CEO Steve Baldwin was also accused of nepotism and retaliatory behavior, leading to fellow co-owner Michele Kang to call for him to step down and sell his ownership interest in the team. Fans and Spirit players alike echoed this sentiment. On October 14, 2021, the Washington Post reported that Steve Baldwin had announced to club investors that he intended to sell the club. Kang officially became majority owner of the Spirit on March 30, 2022.

The Spirit won their first NWSL Championship on Saturday November 20, 2021, when they defeated the Chicago Red Stars 2–1 in extra-time at Lynn Family Stadium in Louisville, Kentucky.

=== 2022–present, Kang ownership ===
On December 20, 2021, the Spirit announced that interim head coach Kris Ward would become the team's permanent head coach. On August 22, 2022, the Spirit fired Ward after a 1–6–9 record to start the 2022 season. Assistant coach Angela Salem managed the team's match in Houston on August 27 before the club hired Albertin Montoya as interim head coach for the remainder of the season. The Spirit posted a 2–3–0 record in its final five matches under Montoya.

On November 21, 2022, the Spirit announced Mark Parsons as the club's next head coach. Parsons previously served in the role for the Spirit's first three seasons of existence from 2013 through 2015.

The Spirit started the season strong, collecting a league-high 23 points through their first 12 games. However, they would go on to win only 1 of their remaining 10 games (1–5–4), landing them in eighth place at the end of the season, one point below the playoff line. Defender Sam Staab collected her record-tying 3rd (and second consecutive) iron women season, playing every minute of the Spirit's 22-game season. On October 17, 2023, two days following the team's final defeat against North Carolina Courage, Mark Parsons was relieved of his duties as the Spirit's head coach after one season.

On January 9, 2024, the club announced the hiring of FC Barcelona Femeni's Jonatan Giráldez Costas as their new head coach.

On March 24, 2025, the club announced Mark Krikorian, general manager and president of soccer operations, was stepping down after his contract expired in February 2025. Krikorian was widely credited for the successes of the Spirit's 2024 season after the club suddenly traded away key players Sam Staab and Ashley Sanchez leading into the 2024 NWSL Draft. These accomplishments included converted forward Tara McKeown being named a 2024 NWSL Defender of the Year contender, signing a highly regarded head coach in Jonatan Giráldez, drafting 2024 NWSL Midfielder and Rookie of the Year in Croix Bethune, and the Spirit making a run to the 2024 NWSL Championship before losing to Orlando Pride in the final match.

On June 2, 2025, the Washington Spirit announced that Giráldez would become the head coach of OL Lyonnes in time for the start of the 2025-26 Première Ligue. Both the Spirit and OL Lyonnes are owned by Michelle Kang. Assistant coach Adrián González will be taking over.

On December 3, 2025, the Spirit announced that former Orlando Pride sporting director Haley Carter had joined the team as president of soccer operations, and that Nathan Minion, who served as acting General Manager (GM) since Mark Krikorian left the team in March, was named as the permanent GM.

On January 23, 2026, Reuters reported the Spirit re-signed Trinity Rodman to a record three-year contract, with an annual salary of over $2 million. Her agent stated this made her the highest-paid player ever in the NWSL and the highest-paid female soccer player in the world.

== Ownership ==
Michele Kang has been the Spirit's majority and managing owner since March 30, 2022, after joining the ownership group in December 2020.

=== Ownership history ===
Bill Lynch was the Spirit's inaugural owner for the National Women's Soccer League launch in 2013. Lynch sold the majority of the team to tech executive Steve Baldwin in late 2018. Several other minority investors were subsequently added to the ownership group, including Kang, Jenna Bush Hager and Chelsea Clinton, daughters of U.S. presidents; Olympic gold medal-winning gymnast Dominique Dawes; and reportedly Washington Capitals star Alexander Ovechkin.

After a series of scandals involving the club during the 2021 NWSL season, Kang and Baldwin engaged in a contentious ownership struggle through 2021 and 2022 that culminated in Kang and the Spirit's other minority investors reaching an agreement with Baldwin and Lynch to sell their stakes and install Kang as the new majority owner. Spirit supporters and players publicly called on Baldwin to sell the team to Kang during the struggle, and at one point Baldwin announced an agreement to sell the team to a group led by Todd Boehly for $10 million less than Kang's offer, which Boehly later withdrew in January 2022. Kang's acquisition required the NWSL board of governors to approve the conversion of some non-equity minority investment stakes in the Spirit into equity investors with voting rights.

On May 16, 2023, Kang and OL Groupe, the holding company of Olympique Lyonnais, announced the formation of a separate entity that would be composed of the Spirit and French women's top-division club Olympique Lyonnais Féminin. OL Groupe would retain a 48% stake in the resulting new entity, and Kang would become the club's majority owner and CEO, pending the approval of the NWSL and French regulators. To avoid conflicts of interest, OL Groupe would sell its NWSL club, OL Reign.

In 2024, Kang's group also purchased Women's Super League 2 team London City Lionesses and announced the group's rebranding to Kynisca Sports International.

== Colors and badge ==
In January 2013, the team unveiled its new colors and badge. The badge was designed to resemble a torch reflecting the notion of "Burning with Spirit." It also contains a crown that holds 11 stars to represent the 11 players on the field and a ball with a single star to represent the 12th player (the team's fans) placed where the fuel for the torch would be representing how the fans "fuel the spirit." All of the components of the badge are "wrapped in the Banner of Spirit for a patriotic theme honoring our flag and all of those who have given their lives and sacrificed much so we can enjoy the freedoms we have."

The logo was designed by freelance designer Pete Schwadel and incorporates the team colors of navy, red, and white, further reinforcing the patriotic theme woven throughout the team's imagery. It also features both "Washington" and "DC" to represent the team's connection with the District and the greater Washington metropolitan area.

In March 2023, the team unveiled a new chrome crest and new colors of black and white for the season. The updated visual identity is part of a rebrand in progress.

The color identity for Spirt evolved again in February 2025 when the team introduced their 'Shockwave kit' to complement the 'Blackout kit' that was introduced the year prior. The neon yellow kit was created to be "emblematic of the energy of the crowd and amplifying the power of the cheers of the club's supporters" and "embodies the Spirit's position as a disruptor and our players as stadium-shakers, noisemakers, and record-breakers."

For the 2026 season, teams across the NWSL adopted the theme of paying homage to their city and their history. Listening to the requests from fans, Spirit announced the new "Spirit in Bloom" kit, designed to embrace "DC's iconic spring cherry blossom bloom in a vibrant pink [neon pink] and the club's Spirit Green [a deep teal green]." While around half of the NWSL teams have adopted a third kit for the start of the 2026 season, Spirit chose to drop the Blackout kit and use the pairing of 'Spirit In Blooom' and 'Shockwave' for the 2026 season.

== Stadium ==
The Maryland SoccerPlex, located in Germantown, Maryland, was home to the Washington Spirit beginning with the inaugural 2013 season. The facility was also home to the Washington Spirit Reserves in the WPSL.

Starting during the 2018 season, the Spirit began coordinating with D.C. United to play home matches at Audi Field in Buzzard Point in Washington D.C. The Spirit played their first match on August 25 that season, hosting the Portland Thorns FC. The match registered the team's highest attended game and was viewed as a means to generate more interest in the team. During the 2019 season, the team announced it would host two home matches at Audi Field.

On November 12, 2019, the team announced that in the 2020 season, the Spirit reached an agreement with D.C. United that will split the team's home games between three stadiums, the Maryland SoccerPlex, Audi Field and Segra Field in Leesburg, Virginia, for four games each. Due to COVID-19 restrictions, the Spirit played two home matches at Segra Field in 2020. Beginning in 2021, the Spirit split all home matches between Audi Field and Segra Field. although the club still planned to hold at least one preseason game a year at the SoccerPlex after 2020.

In 2021, the club temporarily trained at Episcopal High School in Alexandria, Virginia, due to disputes with D.C. United.

On December 6, 2022, the club announced it had reached a deal with D.C. United to become a full-time tenant at Audi Field, playing its full home schedules at the Buzzard Point venue starting with the 2023 season. In addition, the team has relocated its training facilities to United Performance Center in Leesburg, Virginia.

Season	Stadium	Location	Capacity
2013–2019	Maryland SoccerPlex	Germantown, Maryland	4,000
2018–present	Audi Field	Washington, D.C.	20,000
2020–2022	Segra Field	Leesburg, Virginia	5,000

== Supporters ==
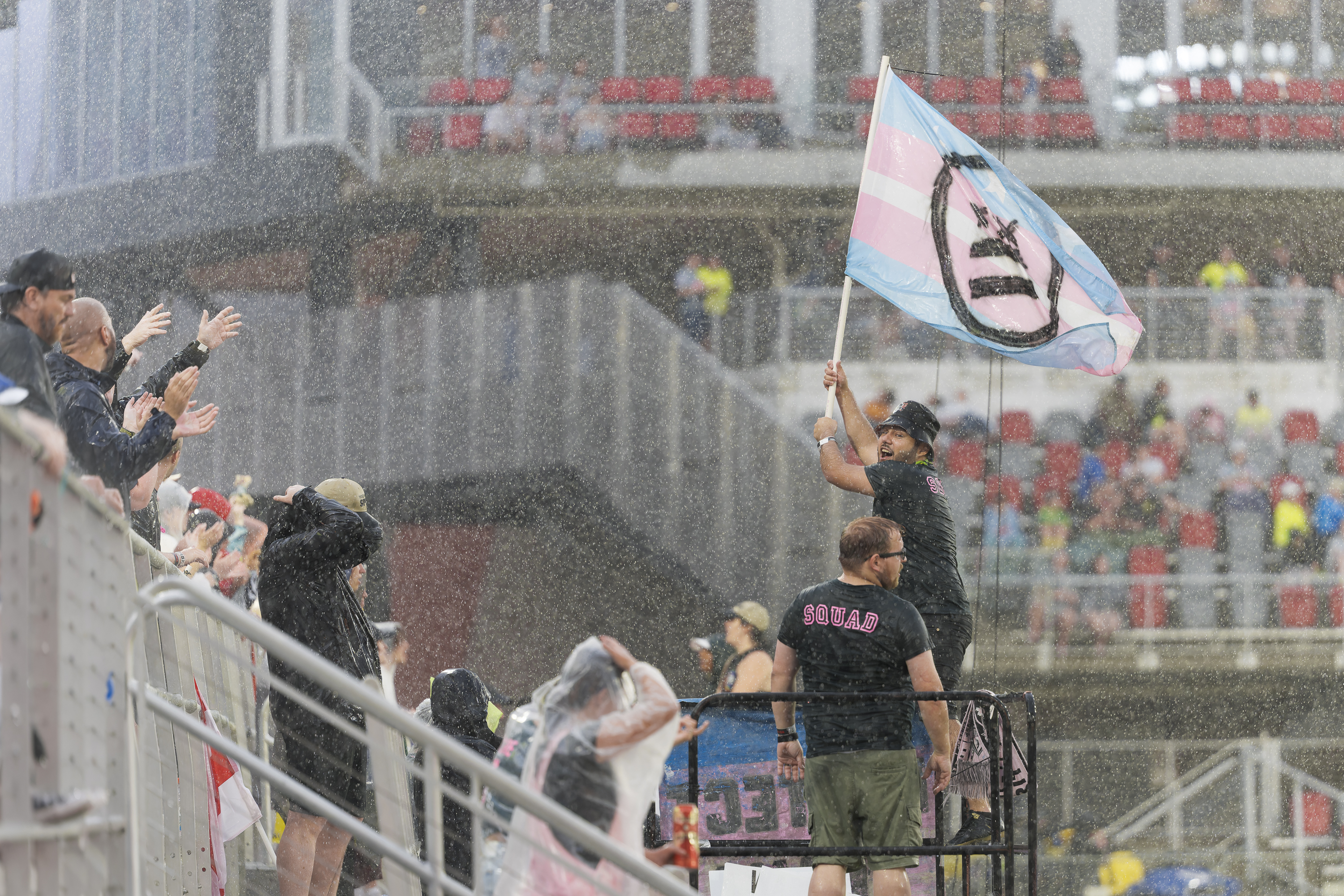
The Spirit Squadron during the August 2, 2026 match versus the San Diego Wave FC

The Spirit Squadron is the name of the supporter's group for the Spirit. The group was started by friends Ashley Nichols, Megan Wesson and Tory Johnson. Of the group's founding, Nichols said, "... with a new league we needed to show the team as much support as possible because we really want a women's pro league to stay here in the United States. So between that and wanting to also provide a fun experience for fans, we decided to create the Spirit Squadron."

Rose Room Collective is an independent supporter group for the Washington Spirit and D.C. United by and for people of color (POC). They were founded on a strong desire to have a supporter group in the D.C. area with a more targeted approach to including and amplifying the voices of POC.

In February 2021, The Washington Post reported that Chelsea Clinton, Jenna Bush Hager, Dominique Dawes and Brianna Scurry were part of an investment group investing in the team.

== Broadcasting ==
In 2016, the Spirit's NWSL Playoff game against the Chicago Red Stars was broadcast on Fox Sports 1 and was available for streaming on the company's online streaming platform, Fox Sports Go.

As of April 2017, Washington Spirit games are streamed exclusively by Go90 for American audiences and via the NWSL website for international viewers. For the 2017 season, the Spirit will be featured in three nationally televised Lifetime NWSL Game of the Week broadcasts on April 22, June 17, and August 19, 2017.

At the beginning of the 2019 season the Spirit announced a broadcast partnership with NBC Sports Washington and Monumental Sports Network.

In 2020, broadcast rights for NWSL matches was consolidated at the league level. Initially, Washington Spirit matches were broadcast on CBS Sports Network, Paramount+ and Twitch. International streaming began in 2021 via geolocked feeds on Twitch. Leading up to the 2024 season, the NWSL negotiated a series of four-year domestic agreements with CBS Sports, ESPN, Prime Video, and Scripps Sports to broadcast most league games. The remaining matches will be made available on NWSL+, the league's streaming service, with clubs permitted to sign agreements with stations or networks to broadcast these remaining matches in their own markets.

Starting in 2023, the Spirit have partnered with Monumental Sports Network to broadcast select matches on the regional sports network, reviving the partnership from 2019. This partnership started with nine matches in 2023, before moving to ten matches in 2024, and five matches in 2025. In 2025, these broadcasts are being supplemented with dedicated postgame shows following all five matches broadcast on Monumental Sports Network.

In 2024, the Spirit added ESPN 630 as an additional broadcast partner, providing live radio broadcasts of select Spirit matches throughout the season.

== Players ==
=== Current squad ===
As of October 8, 2026

No.	Pos.	Nation	Player
1	GK	USA	Aubrey Kingsbury (Captain)
2	FW	USA	Trinity Rodman
3	DF	USA	Casey Krueger
5	DF	CAN	Élisabeth Tsé
6	DF	USA	Kate Wiesner
7	MF	ALG	Mélissa Bethi
8	MF	CMR	Monique Ngock
9	DF	USA	Tara Rudd (Vice Captain)
10	MF	COL	Leicy Santos
11	FW	PAR	Claudia Martínez
12	MF	USA	Andi Sullivan
13	DF	ITA	Lucia Di Guglielmo
14	DF	CAN	Gabby Carle
16	FW	BRA	Tamara Bolt
17	MF	USA	Hal Hershfelt
18	GK	SCO	Sandy MacIver
19	FW	CIV	Rosemonde Kouassi
20	MF	NGR	Deborah Abiodun
24	DF	ENG	Esme Morgan
25	FW	TAN	Clara Luvanga
26	DF	USA	Paige Metayer
27	FW	ITA	Sofia Cantore
28	GK	USA	Sara Wojdelko
29	FW	USA	Emma Gaines-Ramos
31	GK	USA	Kaylie Collins
33	FW	USA	Ashley Hatch
35	DF	USA	Madison Haugen

==== Out on loan ====
No.	Pos.	Nation	Player
22	MF	USA	Heather Stainbrook (loaned to Dallas Trinity FC through December 31, 2026)
—	DF	BFA	Alimata Bélem (loaned to SD Eibar through December 31, 2026)

== Staff ==
=== Coaching staff ===
As of March 11, 2026

Position	Name
Head coach	Adrián González
Assistant Coach	Cristian Catena
Video Analyst Lead and Assistant Coach	Salva Todoli
Player Development Specialist and Assistant Coach	Victoria Boardman
Director of Player Personnel and Assistant Coach	Mike Bristol
Goalkeeper Coach & Set Pieces Specialist	Nicole Barnhart

=== Head coaches ===
As of January 13, 2026

Name	Nat.	Tenure	M	W	D	L	Win %	Notes
Mike Jorden	(United States)	April 6, 2012 – July 1, 2013	11	1	3	7	9.1%	First head coach
Mark Parsons	(England)	July 1, 2013 – September 30, 2015	57	20	13	24	35.1%	
Jim Gabarra	(United States)	October 14, 2015 – August 21, 2018	65	19	11	31	29.2%	
Tom Torres	(United States)	August 21, 2018 – December 27, 2018	3	0	1	2	0.0%	Interim head coach
Richie Burke	(England)	December 27, 2018 – August 10, 2021	50	19	14	17	38.0%	
Kris Ward	(United States)	August 10, 2021 – August 22, 2022	36	12	17	7	33.3%	Interim head coach until December 21, 2021
Angela Salem	(United States)	August 27, 2022	1	0	1	0	0.0%	Acting head coach for one game
Albertin Montoya	(United States)	September 2, 2022 – November 21, 2022	5	2	0	3	40.0%	Interim head coach
Mark Parsons (2)	(England)	November 21, 2022 – October 17, 2023	28	10	9	9	35.71%	
Adrián González	(Spain)	January 23, 2024 – July 5, 2024	15	10	1	4	66.7%	Interim head coach
Jonatan Giráldez	(Spain)	July 6, 2024 – July 17, 2025	35	21	4	10	60.0%	
Adrián González	(Spain)	July 18, 2025 – Present						

== Honors ==
- NWSL Championship
  - Winners: 2021
  - Runners-up: 2016, 2024, 2025 & 2026
- NWSL Challenge Cup
  - Winners : 2025
  - Runners-up: 2022
- CONCACAF W Champions Cup
  - Runners-up: 2025–26

== Award winners ==
Most Valuable Player

- Crystal Dunn: 2015

Golden Boot

- Ashley Hatch: 2021
- Crystal Dunn: 2015

Goalkeeper of the Year

- Aubrey Bledsoe: 2019, 2021

Defender of the Year

- Tara McKeown: 2025

Rookie of the Year

- Croix Bethune: 2024
- Trinity Rodman: 2021

Best XI First Team

- Tara McKeown: 2025
- Casey Krueger: 2024
- Croix Bethune: 2024
- Sam Staab: 2023
- Ashley Hatch: 2021
- Trinity Rodman: 2021, 2024
- Aubrey Bledsoe: 2019
- Crystal Dunn: 2015
- Ali Krieger: 2014
- Diana Matheson: 2013

Best XI Second Team

- Croix Bethune: 2025
- Tara McKeown: 2024
- Hal Hershfelt: 2024
- Ashley Hatch: 2023
- Trinity Rodman: 2023
- Crystal Dunn: 2016
- Jodie Taylor: 2014
- Ali Krieger: 2013, 2016

== Year-by-year ==
Year	League	Regular season	P	W	D	L	Pts	Playoffs	Challenge Cup	Top scorer	Avg. attendance
2013	NWSL	8th	22	3	5	14	14	did not qualify	—	(Canada) Diana Matheson (8)	3,620
2014	NWSL	4th	24	10	5	9	35	Semi-finals	—	(England) Jodie Taylor (11)	3,335
2015	NWSL	4th	20	8	6	6	30	Semi-finals	—	(United States) Crystal Dunn (15)	4,087
2016	NWSL	2nd	20	12	3	5	39	Final	—	(Argentina) Estefanía Banini (5)	3,782
2017	NWSL	10th	24	5	4	15	19	did not qualify	—	(United States) Mallory Pugh (6)	3,491
2018	NWSL	8th	24	2	5	17	11	did not qualify	—	(United States) Ashley Hatch (4)	3,892
2019	NWSL	5th	24	9	7	8	34	did not qualify	—	(United States) Ashley Hatch (7)	6,138
2020	NWSL	3rd	4	2	2	0	7	N/A	Quarterfinals	(United States) Bayley Feist (1)	N/A (Note: Season played behind closed doors owing to the COVID-19 pandemic.)
2021	NWSL	3rd	24	11	7	6	39	Champions	4th East Division	(United States) Ashley Hatch (10)	4,096
2022	NWSL	11th	22	3	10	9	19	did not qualify	Runner-up	(United States) Ashley Hatch (9)	6,222
2023	NWSL	8th	22	7	9	6	30	did not qualify	3rd East Division	(United States) Ashley Hatch (9)	10,886
2024	NWSL	2nd	26	18	2	6	56	Runner's-up		(United States) Trinity Rodman (France) Ouleymata Sarr (9)	13,934
2025	NWSL	2nd	26	12	8	6	44	Runner's-up	Champions	(Nigeria) Gift Monday (10)	15,259

== See also ==
- D.C. United Women
- List of top-division football clubs in CONCACAF countries
- List of professional sports teams in the United States and Canada
- Sports in Washington, D.C.
