= 2014 Sky Blue FC season =

Sky Blue FC
2014 season
- President & CEO: Thomas Hofstetter
- Head coach: Jim Gabarra
- Stadium: Yurcak Field
- NWSL: 6th
- Top goalscorer: Kelley O'Hara; Nadia Nadim (7)
Home colors	Away colors

The 2014 Sky Blue FC season was the team's fifth season of existence. Sky Blue played the 2014 season in National Women's Soccer League, the top tier of women's soccer in the United States.

== Background ==
The foundation of the National Women's Soccer League was announced on November 21, 2012, with Sky Blue FC selected as a host for one of the eight teams.

== Match results ==
=== Regular season ===
April 12, 2014 1	FC Kansas City	1–1	Sky Blue FC	Kansas City, Missouri
	Rodriguez 42'	Report	Freels 48'	Stadium: Durwood Soccer Stadium; Attendance: 3,107; Referee: Dimitar Chavdarov

April 19, 2014 2	Sky Blue FC	1–1	Portland Thorns FC	Piscataway, New Jersey
19:00 EST	Rampone 26'	Report	Long 75' (pen.)	Stadium: Yurcak Field; Attendance: 2,983; Referee: Miguel Panduro

April 28, 2014 3	Boston Breakers	3–2	Sky Blue FC	Boston, Massachusetts
19:00 EST	King 14'; Ashley Grove (yellow card) 40'; Sanderson 42' 60'	Summary	Ocampo 30'; Nick 90+3'	Stadium: Harvard Stadium; Attendance: 1,263; Referee: (United States) Juliana Duncan

April 30, 2014 4	Sky Blue FC	0–2	Seattle Reign FC	Piscataway, New Jersey
16:00 (PDT)	Levin (yellow card) 64'	Report	Kawasumi 24'; Goebel 50'	Stadium: Yurcak Field; Attendance: 582; Referee: Matthew Franz

May 3, 2014 5	Sky Blue FC	1–0	Boston Breakers	Piscataway, New Jersey
18:00 (PDT)	Ocampo 14'	Summary	De Vanna (red card) 89'	Stadium: Yurcak Field; Attendance: 1,294; Referee: (United States) Mark Allatin

May 7, 2014 6	Sky Blue FC	1–1	Chicago Red Stars	Piscataway, New Jersey
18:00 EDT (UTC-04)	Goodson (yellow card) 13'; Freels 27' (pen.)	Summary	Mautz (yellow card) 25'; Brock 58'; Hoy (yellow card) 88'	Stadium: Yurcak Field; Attendance: 604; Referee: (United States) Dimitar Chavdarov

May 11, 2014 7	Western New York Flash	2–0	Sky Blue FC	Rochester, New York
15:00 EDT (UTC-04)	Wambach 48', 90+2'; Williamson (yellow card) 52'	Summary	Morris (yellow card) 90'	Stadium: Sahlen's Stadium; Attendance: 3107; Referee: Elvis Mahmutovic

May 28, 2014 10	Sky Blue FC	0–2	Chicago Red Stars	Piscataway, New Jersey
18:00 EDT (UTC-04)	Foord (yellow card) 84'	Summary	Leon 26'; Chalupny 35'; Johnson (yellow card) 77'	Stadium: Yurcak Field; Attendance: 786; Referee: (United States) Matt Mercier

June 1, 2014 11	Sky Blue FC	1–3	Seattle Reign FC	Piscataway, New Jersey
15:00 (PDT)	Freels 42'	Report	Leroux (yellow card) 35'; Kawasumi 50', 74'; Little 53'	Stadium: Yurcak Field; Attendance: 2,876; Referee: Christina Unkel

Jun 8, 2014 12	Sky Blue FC	0-3	Houston Dash	Piscataway, New Jersey
18:00	Freels (yellow card) 86'		McCarty 10', 79'; Masar 20'	Stadium: Yurcak Field

June 15, 2014 13	Chicago Red Stars	2–2	Sky Blue FC	Lisle, Illinois
13:00 CDT (UTC-05)	Mautz 21'; Bywaters 31'	Summary	Lisonbee-Cutshall 60'; Hayes 63'	Stadium: Village of Lisle-Benedictine University Sports Complex; Attendance: 1211; Referee: Juliana Duncan

June 22, 2014 14	Sky Blue FC	1–1	Boston Breakers	Piscataway, New Jersey
13:00 EDT (UTC-04)	O'Hara 2'; Levin (yellow card) 48'; Schmidt (yellow card) 51'; Stanton (yellow card) 65'	Summary	Reeves 31'; Evans (yellow card) 85'	Stadium: Yurcak Field; Attendance: 1212; Referee: Greg Dopka

June 25, 2014 15	Portland Thorns FC	1–2	Sky Blue FC	Portland, Oregon
22:00 PDT (UTC-06)	Sinclair 54'; Van Hollebeke (yellow card) 76'	Summary	Freels 8' (yellow card) 75'; Foord (yellow card) 46'; Lisonbee-Cutshall 64'	Stadium: Providence Park; Attendance: 10477; Referee: Bernhard Hosu

June 28, 2014 16	Seattle Reign	0–0	Sky Blue FC	Seattle, Washington
21:00 PDT (UTC-06)		Summary	Foord (yellow card) 54'	Stadium: Seattle High School Memorial Stadium; Attendance: 5770; Referee: Chris Spivey

July 6, 2014 17	Sky Blue FC	0–5	FC Kansas City	Piscataway, New Jersey
	Nadim (yellow card) 78'	Summary	Tymrak 2'; Cheney 9'; Hagen 20', 42'; Rodriguez 90+1'	Stadium: Yurcak Field; Attendance: 1349; Referee: Margaret Domka

July 20, 2014 18	Sky Blue FC	4–2	Washington Spirit	Piscataway, New Jersey
	O'Hara 22', 85'; Schmidt 36'; Nadim 81'	Summary	Gayle (yellow card) 57' (goal) 89'; Taylor 88'	Stadium: Yurcak Field; Attendance: 1740; Referee: Bernhard Hosu

July 27, 2014 19	FC Kansas City	2–1	Sky Blue FC	Kansas City, Missouri
	Rodriguez 34'; Cheney 70'	Summary	Foord (yellow card) 69'; Nadim 87'	Stadium: Durwood Soccer Stadium; Attendance: 1852; Referee: Josh Wilkens

July 31, 2014 20	Sky Blue FC	1–0	Western New York Flash	Piscataway, New Jersey
19:00	Nadim (yellow card) 22'; Levin (yellow card) 39'; O'Hara 50'	Summary	Lloyd (yellow card) 26'; Bermúdez (yellow card) 55'	Stadium: Yurcak Field; Attendance: 3471; Referee: Josh Wilkens

August 9, 2014 21	Houston Dash	1–3	Sky Blue FC	Houston, Texas
	Edwards (yellow card) 38'; Romero (yellow card) 73'; Burger 86'	Summary	Nadim (yellow card) 23' (goal) 39', 74', 90+2'; Nick (yellow card) 62'	Stadium: BBVA Compass Stadium; Attendance: 5143; Referee: Mark Allatin

August 13, 2014 22	Western New York Flash	2–3	Sky Blue FC	Rochester, New York
19:00	Martín 23'; Bermúdez 79'	Summary	O'Hara 24'; Nadim 48', 89'	Stadium: Sahlen's Stadium; Attendance: 4339; Referee: Chris Spivey

August 16, 2014 23	Washington Spirit	0–1	Sky Blue FC	Germantown, Maryland
18:30		Summary	Ocampo 27'	Stadium: Maryland SoccerPlex; Attendance: 4,282; Referee: (United States) David Mon

August 20, 2014 24	Sky Blue FC	1–0	Houston Dash	Piscataway, New Jersey
19:00	Lisonbee Cutshall 18'; Nick (yellow card) 72'	Summary	Rafaelle Souza (yellow card) 85'	Stadium: Yurcak Field; Attendance: 1,328; Referee: (United States) Bernhard Hosu

=== Standings ===
Pos	Team	Pld	W	D	L	GF	GA	GD	Pts	Qualification
1	Seattle Reign FC	24	16	6	2	50	20	+30	54	NWSL Shield
2	FC Kansas City (C)	24	12	5	7	39	32	+7	41	NWSL Playoffs
3	Portland Thorns FC	24	10	6	8	39	35	+4	36	NWSL Playoffs
4	Washington Spirit	24	10	5	9	36	43	−7	35	NWSL Playoffs
5	Chicago Red Stars	24	9	8	7	32	26	+6	35	
6	Sky Blue FC	24	9	7	8	30	37	−7	34	
7	Western New York Flash	24	8	4	12	42	38	+4	28	
8	Boston Breakers	24	6	2	16	37	53	−16	20	
9	Houston Dash	24	5	3	16	23	44	−21	18	

Source: NWSL
Rules for classification: Tiebreakers
(C) Champions

==== Results summary ====
Overall								Home						Away					
Pld	Pts	W	L	T	GF	GA	GD	W	L	T	GF	GA	GD	W	L	T	GF	GA	GD
24	34	9	8	7	30	37	−7	4	5	3	11	20	−9	5	3	4	19	17	+2

Last updated: April 27, 2014
Source: Soccerway, Sky Blue FC
Pld = Matches played; Pts = Points; W = Matches won; T = Matches tied; L = Matches lost; GF = Goals for; GA = Goals against; GD = Goal difference

==== Results by round ====
Round	1	2	3	4	5	6	7	8	9	10	11	12	13	14	15	16	17	18	19	20	21	22	23	24
Stadium	A	H	A	H	H	H	A	A	A	H	H	H	A	H	A	A	H	H	H	A	H	A	A	A
Result	D	D	L	L	W	D	L	D	W	L	L	L	D	D	W	D	L	W	L	W	W	W	W	W

Updated to match(es) played on August 20, 2014. Source: Soccerway
A = Away; H = Home; W = Win; D = Draw; L = Loss

== Team ==
=== Roster ===
Note: Flags indicate national team as defined under FIFA eligibility rules; some limited exceptions apply. Players may hold more than one non-FIFA nationality.

No.	Pos.	Nation	Player
1	GK	USA	Brittany Cameron
2	DF	USA	CoCo Goodson
3	DF	USA	Christie Rampone
4	DF	AUS	Caitlin Foord
5	DF	USA	Kendall Johnson
6	MF	USA	Taylor Lytle
7	FW	JPN	Nanase Kiryu
8	FW	MEX	Mónica Ocampo
10	MF	USA	Katy Freels
11	FW	USA	Maya Hayes

No.	Pos.	Nation	Player
12	MF	USA	Ashley Nick
13	MF	CAN	Sophie Schmidt
16	MF	CAN	Jonelle Filigno
17	DF	USA	Hayley Haagsma
18	DF	USA	Lindsi Lisonbee Cutshall
19	FW	USA	Kelley O'Hara
21	GK	USA	Jillian Loyden
24	MF	USA	Maddie Thompson
22	DF	USA	Camille Levin
32	MF	USA	Meg Morris

=== Squad statistics ===
Key to positions: FW – Forward, MF – Midfielder, DF – Defender, GK – Goalkeeper

N	Pos	Player	GP	GS	Min	G	A	WG	Shot	SOG	Cro	CK	Off	Foul	FS	YC	RC
18	DF	Lindsi Cutshall	14	11	943	3	0	2	5	3	0	0	2	4	4	0	0
16	FW	Jonelle Filigno	17	6	697	1	1	0	8	3	0	0	11	15	11	1	0
4	DF	Caitlin Foord	21	20	1825	0	2	0	6	3	0	1	1	20	19	4	0
10	MF	Katy Freels	23	23	2021	5	4	0	45	25	1	79	1	27	25	2	0
2	DF	CoCo Goodson	21	18	1652	0	0	0	8	1	0	0	0	8	11	1	0
11	FW	Maya Hayes	23	13	1146	1	1	0	22	9	0	0	6	14	21	0	0
5	DF	Kendall Johnson	15	12	1123	0	0	0	6	3	0	0	0	7	10	0	0
7	MF	Nanase Kiryu	16	12	909	0	1	0	11	6	0	17	0	10	6	0	0
22	DF	Cami Levin	23	21	1884	0	0	0	9	4	0	1	1	13	14	3	0
6	MF	Taylor Lytle	7	5	481	0	1	0	9	4	0	0	1	2	6	0	0
32	MF	Meg Morris	3	1	96	0	0	0	0	0	0	0	0	1	0	1	0
9	FW	Nadia Nadim	6	5	495	7	3	3	23	12	0	0	12	13	3	3	0
12	MF	Ashley Nick	22	17	1612	1	0	0	15	7	0	0	1	16	10	3	0
8	FW	Mónica Ocampo	18	13	996	3	0	2	44	15	0	0	17	14	6	0	0
19	DF	Kelley O'Hara	22	22	1917	7	5	2	61	27	0	3	25	10	16	0	0
3	DF	Christie Rampone	19	18	1665	1	2	0	6	3	2	0	1	7	8	0	0
13	MF	Sophie Schmidt	22	22	1964	1	0	0	40	13	0	5	1	22	21	1	0
44	MF	Nikki Stanton	4	0	78	0	0	0	2	0	0	0	0	2	3	1	0
25	DF	Maddie Thompson	2	1	96	0	0	0	0	0	0	1	0	0	0	0	0

N	Pos	Goal keeper	GP	GS	Min	W	L	T	Shot	SOG	Sav	GA	GA/G	Pen	PKF	SO
1	GK	Brittany Cameron	7	7	630	2	3	2	91	40	28	12	1.714	0	0	2
21	GK	Jillian Loyden	17	17	1530	7	5	5	210	94	69	25	1.471	2	3	4

== Honors and awards ==
=== NWSL Awards ===
==== NWSL Yearly Awards ====
Player	Award	Ref.
(United States) Christie Rampone	Best X1	

== See also ==
- 2014 National Women's Soccer League season
- 2014 in American soccer
