= 2013 Sky Blue FC season =

Sky Blue FC
2013 season
- President & CEO: Thomas Hofstetter
- Head coach: Jim Gabarra
- Stadium: Yurcak Field
- NWSL: 4th
- NWSL Playoffs: Semi-finals
- Top goalscorer: League: Ocampo (8); All: Ocampo (8)
- Highest home attendance: 3,002 vs Portland Thorns FC (June 22, 2013)
- Lowest home attendance: 688 vs Chicago Red Stars (May 8, 2013)
Home colors	Away colors

The 2013 Sky Blue FC season was the team's fourth season of existence. Sky Blue played the 2013 season in National Women's Soccer League, the top tier of women's soccer in the United States.

== Background ==
The foundation of the National Women's Soccer League was announced on November 21, 2012, with Sky Blue FC selected as a host for one of the eight teams.

== Match results ==
=== Regular season ===
April 14, 2013 1	Sky Blue FC	1–0	Western New York Flash	Piscataway, New Jersey
18:00 EST	Zerboni 42' (o.g.)	Report		Stadium: Yurcak Field; Attendance: 2,611

April 27, 2013 2	Washington Spirit	1–2	Sky Blue FC	Boyds, Maryland
19:00 EST	Matheson 35'	Report	Goodson 2'; O'Hara (yellow card) 28'; Schmidt 48'	Stadium: Maryland SoccerPlex; Attendance: 4,569; Referee: Kara Honthumb

May 1, 2013 3	Western New York Flash	2–1	Sky Blue FC	Rochester, New York
19:05 EST	Martín 6'; Wambach 20'; Kerr (yellow card) 45'	Report	Schmidt 44'; O'Hara (yellow card) 72'	Stadium: Sahlen's Stadium; Attendance: 2,127; Referee: Miguel Panduro

May 8, 2013 4	Sky Blue FC	1–1	Chicago Red Stars	Piscataway, New Jersey
19:00 EST	Schmidt 88'	Report	Moscato (yellow card) 5'; Mautz 90+2'	Stadium: Yurcak Field; Attendance: 688; Referee: Eugene Mednikov

May 11, 2013 5	Sky Blue FC	2–0	Seattle Reign FC	Piscataway, New Jersey
15:00 (PST)	Adams 31'; De Vanna 35'	Report		Stadium: Yurcak Field; Attendance: 1,459; Referee: Steve Montanino

May 16, 2013 6	Portland Thorns FC	0–1	Sky Blue FC	Portland, Oregon
19:30	Sinclair (yellow card) 80'	Report	Lytle 80'	Stadium: Jeld-Wen Field; Attendance: 11,055; Referee: Josh Wilkens

May 19, 2013 7	Seattle Reign FC	0–3	Sky Blue FC	Tukwila, Washington
18:00 (PST)	Ruiz (yellow card) 25' (red card) 63'; Kyle (yellow card) 40'	Report	De Vanna 9' (yellow card) 70'; Bock (yellow card) 66'; Schmidt 78'; Lytle 86'	Stadium: Starfire Sports Stadium; Attendance: 1,046; Referee: Kari Seitz

May 25, 2013 8	FC Kansas City	0–1	Sky Blue FC	Overland Park, Kansas
19:35 CST	Sesselmann (yellow card) 22'	Report	Schmidt 23' (pen.)	Stadium: Shawnee Mission District Stadium; Attendance: 4,186; Referee: John McCloskey

June 1, 2013 9	Sky Blue FC	5–1	Boston Breakers	Piscataway, New Jersey
19:00 EST	Adams 7', 85'; De Vanna 14', 56'; Lytle 17'; Foord (yellow card) 61'	Report	McNeill (yellow card) 52'; Lohman (yellow card) 62'; Leon 75'	Stadium: Yurcak Field; Attendance: 1,312; Referee: Robert Sibiga

June 8, 2013 10	Sky Blue FC	0–3	Western New York Flash	Piscataway, New Jersey
19:00 EST		Report	Kerr 4'; Lloyd 45'; Reynolds (yellow card) 50'; Wambach 82'	Stadium: Yurcak Field; Attendance: 2,056; Referee: Josh Wilkens

June 16, 2013 11	Boston Breakers	2–3	Sky Blue FC	Somerville, Massachusetts
18:30 EST	Lohman 61'; Dragotta (yellow card) 70'; Simon 90+5'	Report	De Vanna 9'; Ocampo 26'; Freels 71'	Stadium: Dilboy Stadium; Attendance: 2,687; Referee: Christina Unkel

June 22, 2013 12	Sky Blue FC	0–0	Portland Thorns FC	Piscataway, New Jersey
19:00 EST		Report		Stadium: Yurcak Field; Attendance: 3,002; Referee: Kari Seitz

June 26, 2013 13	Sky Blue FC	2–2	FC Kansas City	Piscataway, New Jersey
19:00 EST	Tymrak 14'; Cheney 74'	Report	Ocampo 85', 90+2'	Stadium: Yurcak Field; Attendance: 1,126; Referee: Robert Sibiga

June 30, 2013 14	Boston Breakers	3–2	Sky Blue FC	Somerville, Massachusetts
18:30 EST	Leroux 29', 41'; Nogueira 35'	Report	Schmidt 32' (red card) 90+2'; Ocampo 58'	Stadium: Dilboy Stadium; Attendance: 1,876; Referee: Katja Koroleva

July 6, 2013 15	Sky Blue FC	1–0	Washington Spirit	Piscataway, New Jersey
19:00 EST	Ocampo 73'	Report		Stadium: Yurcak Field; Attendance: 1,322; Referee: John McCloskey

July 13, 2013 16	Sky Blue FC	0–0	Boston Breakers	Piscataway, New Jersey
19:00 EST		Report		Stadium: Yurcak Field; Attendance: 1,279; Referee: Margaret Domka

July 21, 2013 17	Western New York Flash	3–0	Sky Blue FC	Rochester, New York
16:05 EST	Lloyd 13'; Taylor 35'; Kerr 56'	Report		Stadium: Sahlen's Stadium; Attendance: 4,664; Referee: Kara Honthumb

July 28, 2013 18	Sky Blue FC	0–1	FC Kansas City	Piscataway, New Jersey
18:00 EST		Report	Mathias (yellow card) 10'; Jones 76'	Stadium: Yurcak Field; Attendance: 1,302; Referee: Christina Unkel

July 31, 2013 19	Portland Thorns FC	1-3	Sky Blue FC	Portland, Oregon
19:30 PST	Morgan 37'; Shim 65'; Long 73'	Report	Marshall 18' (o.g.)	Stadium: Jeld-Wen Field; Attendance: 13,769; Referee: Margaret Domka

August 3, 2013 20	Sky Blue FC	1-0	Washington Spirit	Piscataway, New Jersey
19:00 EST	Ocampo 58'	Report		Stadium: Yurcak Field; Attendance: 2,172; Referee: Elvis Mahmutovic

August 10, 2013 21	Chicago Red Stars	3-3	Sky Blue FC	Lisle, Illinois
18:00 CST	Domínguez 8'; Santacaterina 77', 90'	Report	Ocampo 15', 89'; Schmidt 36'	Stadium: Benedictine University Sports Complex; Attendance: 2,064; Referee: Kristen Salazar

August 18, 2013 22	Washington Spirit	1-1	Sky Blue FC	Boyds, Maryland
17:00 EST	Ochs 40'	Report	Lytle 84'	Stadium: Maryland SoccerPlex; Attendance: 4,241; Referee: Kara Honthumb

=== Playoffs ===
August 24, 2013 Semi-finals	Western New York Flash	2–0	Sky Blue FC	Rochester, New York
8:00 pm EDT	Lloyd 33', 90+' (yellow card) 42'; Huffman (yellow card) 90+'	Report; Report	Makoski (yellow card) 51'; Adams (yellow card) 90'	Stadium: Sahlen's Stadium; Attendance: 7,316; Referee: Katja Koroleva

=== Standings ===
Pos	Team	Pld	W	D	L	GF	GA	GD	Pts	Qualification
1	Western New York Flash	22	10	8	4	36	20	+16	38	NWSL Shield
2	FC Kansas City	22	11	5	6	34	22	+12	38	NWSL Playoffs
3	Portland Thorns FC (C)	22	11	5	6	32	25	+7	38	NWSL Playoffs
4	Sky Blue FC	22	10	6	6	31	26	+5	36	NWSL Playoffs
5	Boston Breakers	22	8	6	8	35	34	+1	30	
6	Chicago Red Stars	22	8	6	8	32	36	−4	30	
7	Seattle Reign FC	22	5	3	14	22	36	−14	18	
8	Washington Spirit	22	3	5	14	16	39	−23	14	

Source: soccerway.com
Rules for classification: Tiebreakers
(C) Champions

==== Results summary ====
Overall								Home						Away					
Pld	Pts	W	L	T	GF	GA	GD	W	L	T	GF	GA	GD	W	L	T	GF	GA	GD
22	36	10	6	6	31	26	+5	5	2	4	13	8	+5	5	4	2	18	18	0

Last updated: 31 August 2013
Source: Soccerway
Pld = Matches played; Pts = Points; W = Matches won; T = Matches tied; L = Matches lost; GF = Goals for; GA = Goals against; GD = Goal difference

==== Results by round ====
Round	1	2	3	4	5	6	7	8	9	10	11	12	13	14	15	16	17	18	19	20	21	22
Stadium	H	A	A	H	H	A	A	A	H	H	A	H	H	A	H	H	A	H	A	H	A	A
Result	W	W	L	D	W	W	W	W	W	L	W	D	D	L	W	D	L	L	L	W	D	D

Updated to match(es) played on 31 August 2013. Source: Soccerway
A = Away; H = Home; W = Win; D = Draw; L = Loss

== Team ==
=== Roster ===
Note: Flags indicate national team as defined under FIFA eligibility rules; some limited exceptions apply. Players may hold more than one non-FIFA nationality.

No.	Pos.	Nation	Player
1	GK	USA	Brittany Cameron
2	DF	USA	CoCo Goodson
3	DF	USA	Christie Rampone
4	DF	AUS	Caitlin Foord
5	DF	USA	Kendall Johnson
6	MF	USA	Taylor Lytle
7	MF	MEX	Nayeli Rangel
8	FW	MEX	Mónica Ocampo
9	FW	USA	Danesha Adams
10	MF	USA	Brittany Bock
11	FW	AUS	Lisa De Vanna

No.	Pos.	Nation	Player
12	MF	USA	Ashley Nick
13	DF	CAN	Melanie Booth
16	MF	CAN	Sophie Schmidt
18	DF	USA	Lindsi Lisonbee Cutshall
19	FW	USA	Kelley O'Hara
20	GK	ENG	Ashley Baker
21	GK	USA	Jillian Loyden
22	MF	USA	Manya Makoski
23	MF	USA	Katy Freels
24	MF	USA	Maddie Thompson
28	DF	USA	Rachel Breton

=== Appearances and goals ===
As of 6 September 2013

No.	Pos	Nat	Player	Total		NWSL	
No.	Pos	Nat	Player	Apps	Goals	Apps	Goals
1	GK	(United States) USA	Brittany Cameron	19	0	19+0	0
2	DF	(United States) USA	CoCo Goodson	23	1	23+0	1
3	DF	(United States) USA	Christie Rampone	21	0	21+0	0
4	DF	(Australia) AUS	Caitlin Foord	15	0	14+1	0
5	FW	(United States) USA	Kendall Johnson	23	0	23+0	0
6	MF	(United States) USA	Taylor Lytle	22	4	13+9	4
7	MF	(Mexico) MEX	Nayeli Rangel	10	0	5+5	0
8	FW	(Mexico) MEX	Mónica Ocampo	17	8	11+6	8
9	FW	(United States) USA	Danesha Adams	21	3	19+2	3
10	MF	(United States) USA	Brittany Bock	7	0	4+3	0
11	FW	(Australia) AUS	Lisa De Vanna	17	5	15+2	5
12	MF	(United States) USA	Ashley Nick	4	0	4+0	0
13	DF	(Canada) CAN	Melanie Booth	3	0	0+3	0
16	MF	(Canada) CAN	Sophie Schmidt	21	7	20+1	7
18	DF	(United States) USA	Lindsi Lisonbee Cutshall	8	0	3+5	0
19	FW	(United States) USA	Kelley O'Hara	12	0	10+2	0
20	GK	(England) ENG	Ashley Baker	1	0	0+1	0
21	GK	(United States) USA	Jillian Loyden	4	0	4+0	0
22	MF	(United States) USA	Manya Makoski	21	0	20+1	0
23	MF	(United States) USA	Katy Freels	23	1	22+1	1
25	MF	(United States) USA	Maddie Thompson	14	0	4+10	0
28	DF	(United States) USA	Rachel Breton	1	0	0+1	0

Source: Sky Blue FC Player Stats

==== Top scorers ====
Players with 1 goal or more included only.

As of 6 September 2013

Rk.	Nat	Pos	Player	Total	NWSL
1	(Mexico)	FW	Mónica Ocampo	8	8
2	(Canada)	MF	Sophie Schmidt	7	7
3	(Australia)	FW	Lisa De Vanna	5	5
4	(United States)	MF	Taylor Lytle	4	4
5	(United States)	FW	Danesha Adams	3	3
6	(United States)	DF	CoCo Goodson	1	1
6	(United States)	MF	Katy Freels	1	1

Source: Sky Blue FC Player Stats

==== Disciplinary record ====
Players with 1 card or more included only.

As of 6 September 2013

No.	Nat	Pos	Player	Total		NWSL	
No.	Nat	Pos	Player	Yellow card	Red card	Yellow card	Red card
16	(Canada)	MF	Sophie Schmidt	0	1	0	1
19	(United States)	FW	Kelley O'Hara	2	0	2	0
10	(United States)	MF	Brittany Bock	1	0	1	0
11	(United States)	FW	Lisa De Vanna	1	0	1	0
4	(Australia)	DF	Caitlin Foord	1	0	1	0
6	(United States)	DF	CoCo Goodson	1	0	1	0
22	(Australia)	MF	Manya Makoski	1	0	1	0
9	(United States)	FW	Danesha Adams	1	0	1	0

Source: Sky Blue FC Player Stats

==== Goalkeeper stats ====
Last updated: 31 August 2013

No.	Nat	Player	Total				NWSL			
No.	Nat	Player	MIN	GA	GAA	SV	MIN	GA	GAA	SV
20	(England)	Ashley Baker	1	0	—	1	1	0	—	1
21	(United States)	Jillian Loyden	360	9	2.25	21	360	9	2.25	21
1	(United States)	Brittany Cameron	1619	17	.944	65	1619	17	.944	65
		TOTALS	1980	26	3.194	86	1980	26	3.194	86

Source: Sky Blue FC Player Stats

== Honors and awards ==
=== NWSL Awards ===
==== NWSL Yearly Awards ====
Player	Award	Ref.
(United States) Christie Rampone	Best X1	
(Australia) Caitlin Foord	Best X1	

==== NWSL Monthly awards ====
Month	Player of the Month		Club	Month's Statline
May	(United States)	Brittany Cameron	Sky Blue FC	GAA 0.5, 27 saves of 30 shots on goal, 360 min, 0 G; SBFC 4-1-1 in May
August	(Mexico)	Mónica Ocampo	Sky Blue FC	3 G, in 3 games

==== NWSL Weekly awards ====
Week	Player of the Week		Club	Week's Statline
Week 1	(United States)	Brittany Cameron	Sky Blue FC	5 SVS, SHO
Week 6	(United States)	Christie Rampone	Sky Blue FC	180min, 0 GA
Week 8	(Australia)	Lisa De Vanna	Sky Blue FC	2 G (14', 56'), 1 A

== See also ==
- 2013 National Women's Soccer League season
- 2013 in American soccer
