= 2015 Sky Blue FC season =

Sky Blue FC
2015 season
- President and CEO: Thomas Hofstetter
- Head coach: Jim Gabarra
- Stadium: Yurcak Field
- NWSL: 8th
- Top goalscorer: Sam Kerr; Nadia Nadim (6)
- Highest home attendance: 5,547 (Aug. 22 vs. Portland)
- Lowest home attendance: 743 (Apr. 26 vs. Washington)
Home colors	Away colors

The 2015 Sky Blue FC season was the team's sixth season of existence. Sky Blue played the 2015 season in National Women's Soccer League, the top tier of women's soccer in the United States.

== Team ==
=== Roster ===
Note: Flags indicate national team as defined under FIFA eligibility rules; some limited exceptions apply. Players may hold more than one non-FIFA nationality.

No.	Pos.	Nation	Player
1	GK	USA	Brittany Cameron
2	MF	USA	Shawna Gordon
4	DF	AUS	Caitlin Foord
6	MF	USA	Taylor Lytle
8	FW	MEX	Mónica Ocampo
9	FW	DEN	Nadia Nadim
10	MF	USA	Katy Freels
11	FW	USA	Maya Hayes
13	DF	USA	Kristin Grubka
14	MF	USA	Sarah Killion

No.	Pos.	Nation	Player
16	FW	CAN	Jonelle Filigno
17	DF	USA	Hayley Haagsma
18	DF	USA	Lindsi Lisonbee Cutshall
19	DF	USA	Kelley O'Hara
20	FW	AUS	Samantha Kerr
21	GK	USA	Aubrey Bledsoe
32	DF	USA	Meg Morris
33	DF	USA	Shade Pratt
42	MF	USA	Lo'eau LaBonta
44	MF	USA	Nikki Stanton

== Match results ==
=== Preseason ===
March 14, Sat 1	Sky Blue FC	3–0	St. John's Red Storm	Scotch Plains, New Jersey
EDT (UTC−04)	Freels 50' (pen.); Killion 56'; Hayes 77'	Report		Stadium: Wexler Field

March 21, Sat 2	Sky Blue FC	1–0	North Carolina Tar Heels	West Windsor, New Jersey
EDT (UTC−04)	Freels 6'	Report	Nielson (yellow card) 61'	Stadium: Mercer County Community College

March 26, Thu 3	Penn State Nittany Lions	0–2	Sky Blue FC	Palmyra, Pennsylvania
EDT (UTC−04)		Report	Hayes 13'; Nadim 46'	Stadium: In the Net Sports Complex

March 29, Sun 4	Sky Blue FC	2–0	Rutgers Scarlet Knights	Toms River, New Jersey
EDT (UTC−04)	Freels 14'; Diederich 79'	Report		Stadium: Toms River High School North

=== Regular season ===
April 12, Sun 1	FC Kansas City	0–1	Sky Blue FC	Kansas City, Kansas
16:00 EDT (UTC−04)		Report	Nadim 29' (Morris); O'Hara (yellow card) 90'	Stadium: Sporting Park; Attendance: 8,489; Referee: Chris Spivey

April 18, Sat 2	Sky Blue FC	1–1	Houston Dash	Piscataway, New Jersey
19:00 EDT (UTC−04)	Freels 14' (O'Hara), (yellow card) 90'	Report	McDonald 52' (Brian)	Stadium: Yurcak Field; Attendance: 1,742; Referee: Elvis Mahmutovic

April 26, Sun 3	Sky Blue FC	1–3	Washington Spirit	Piscataway, New Jersey
18:00 EDT (UTC−04)	Freels 62' (Nadim)	Report	Dunn 6' (Ordega) 40'; Nairn 48' (Ordega)	Stadium: Yurcak Field; Attendance: 743

May 2, Sat 3	Chicago Red Stars	1–0	Sky Blue FC	Lisle, Illinois
18:00 EDT (UTC−04)	Colaprico 55' (unassisted)	Report	Nadim (yellow card) 86'	Stadium: Village of Lisle-Benedictine University Sports Complex; Attendance: 1,402

May 9, Sat 5	Sky Blue FC	1–1	Seattle Reign FC	Piscataway, New Jersey
19:00 EDT (UTC−04)	Nadim (yellow card) 78', (goal) 90' (pen.); Grubka (yellow card) 82'	Report	Barnes 76'; Fishlock (red card) 90'	Stadium: Yurcak Field; Attendance: 1,562

May 16, Sat 6	Washington Spirit	1–0	Sky Blue FC	Germantown, Maryland
19:00 EDT (UTC−04)	Ordega 92+' (Dunn)	Report		Stadium: Maureen Hendricks Field Maryland SoccerPlex

May 22, Fri 7	Boston Breakers	1–1	Sky Blue FC	Boston
19:00 EDT (UTC−04)	McCaffrey 60' (unassisted)	Report	Freels 8' (Nadim)	Stadium: Soldiers Field Soccer Stadium; Attendance: 1,861

May 31, Sun 8	Sky Blue FC	1–1	Houston Dash	Piscataway, New Jersey
3:00 EDT (UTC−04)	Haagsma 11' (Grubka); DeCesare (yellow card) 86'	Report	Bailey 86' (unassisted)	Stadium: Yurcak Field

June 6, Sat 9	Seattle Reign FC	3–0	Sky Blue FC	Seattle
22:00 EDT (UTC−04)	Winters 8' (Fishlock); Fishlock 28' (Cox); Little 77' (penalty)	Report		Stadium: Memorial Stadium; Attendance: 2,225; Referee: Greg Dopka

June 28, Sun 10	Sky Blue FC	0–3	Chicago Red Stars	Piscataway, New Jersey
18:00 EDT (UTC−04)		Report	DiBernardo 6' (Huerta); Hoy 34' (Huerta); Mautz 62' (Hoy)	Stadium: Yurcak Field

July 3, Fri 11	Portland Thorns FC	2–1	Sky Blue FC	Portland, Oregon
22:00 EDT (UTC−04)	Kyle (yellow card) 54'; Long 70' (penalty); Farrelly 79' (Kleiner)	Report	Freels 27' (Lytle); Stanton (yellow card) 56'; Levin (red card) 69'; Foord (yellow card) 80'	Stadium: Providence Park; Attendance: 12,223; Referee: Levi Rippy

July 11, Sat 12	Sky Blue FC	1–0	Portland Thorns FC	Piscataway, New Jersey
19:00 EDT (UTC−04)	Kerr 54' (Hayes)	Report		Stadium: Yurcak Field

July 19, Sun 13	Western New York Flash	3–3	Sky Blue FC	Rochester, New York
3:00 EDT (UTC−04)	Spencer 2'; Hinkle 25'; Heyman 50'	Report	Nadim 39' (O'Hara); Katy Freels 60' (O'Hara); Christie Rampone 62' (Freels); Taylor Lytle (yellow card) 94'	Stadium: Sahlen's Stadium; Attendance: 3,161

July 25, Sat 14	Sky Blue FC	3–1	Boston Breakers	Piscataway, New Jersey
19:00 EDT (UTC−04)	O'Hara 13' (Freels), 36' (Kerr); Kerr 52' (Haagsma)	Report	Lauren Lazo 84' (Rafinha)	Stadium: Yurcak Field; Attendance: 2,067; Referee: Tori Penso

August 1, Sat 15	Sky Blue FC	1–2	Western New York Flash	Piscataway, New Jersey
19:00 EDT (UTC−04)				Stadium: Yurcak Field

August 7, Fri 16	Houston Dash	0–2	Sky Blue FC	Houston
8:30 EDT (UTC−04)				Stadium: BBVA Compass Stadium

August 12, Wed 17	Chicago Red Stars	1–1	Sky Blue FC	Lisle, Illinois
14:00 EDT (UTC−04)	Leon 15' (Gilliland); Chalupny (yellow card) 64'	Report	Kerr 36' (unassisted); Filigno (yellow card) 86'	Stadium: Village of Lisle-Benedictine University Sports Complex

August 22, Sat 18	Sky Blue FC	1–0	Portland Thorns FC	Piscataway, New Jersey
19:00 EDT (UTC−04)	Nadim 19' (O'Hara)	Report		Stadium: Yurcak Field; Attendance: 5,547

August 29, Sat 19	Seattle Reign FC	1–1	Sky Blue FC	Seattle
22:00 EDT (UTC−04)	Winters (yellow card) 68'; Fishlock 90' (Little)	Report	Nadim 6'; Haagsma (yellow card) 62'	Stadium: Memorial Stadium; Attendance: 4,471; Referee: Greg Dopka

September 2, Wed 20	Sky Blue FC	2–3	FC Kansas City	Piscataway, New Jersey
19:00 EDT (UTC−04)	Kerr 39' (O'Hara), 72' (Killion)	Report	Hagen 5' (Rodriguez); Rodriguez 42' (O'Reilly), 52' (Moros); Becky Sauerbrunn (yellow card) 92'	Stadium: Yurcak Field; Referee: Levi Rippy

=== Standings ===
Pos	Team	Pld	W	D	L	GF	GA	GD	Pts	Qualification
1	Seattle Reign FC	20	13	4	3	41	21	+20	43	NWSL Shield
2	Chicago Red Stars	20	8	9	3	31	22	+9	33	NWSL Playoffs
3	FC Kansas City (C)	20	9	5	6	32	20	+12	32	NWSL Playoffs
4	Washington Spirit	20	8	6	6	31	28	+3	30	NWSL Playoffs
5	Houston Dash	20	6	6	8	21	26	−5	24	
6	Portland Thorns FC	20	6	5	9	27	29	−2	23	
7	Western New York Flash	20	6	5	9	24	34	−10	23	
8	Sky Blue FC	20	5	7	8	22	28	−6	22	
9	Boston Breakers	20	4	3	13	22	43	−21	15	

Source: NWSL
Rules for classification: Tiebreakers
(C) Champions

Results summary

Overall								Home						Away					
Pld	Pts	W	L	T	GF	GA	GD	W	L	T	GF	GA	GD	W	L	T	GF	GA	GD
20	22	5	8	7	22	28	−6	3	4	3	12	15	−3	2	4	4	10	13	−3

Last updated: September 26, 2015
Source: Soccerway
Pld = Matches played; Pts = Points; W = Matches won; T = Matches tied; L = Matches lost; GF = Goals for; GA = Goals against; GD = Goal difference

Results by round

Round	1	2	3	4	5	6	7	8	9	10	11	12	13	14	15	16	17	18	19	20
Stadium	A	H	H	A	H	A	A	H	A	H	A	H	A	H	H	A	A	H	A	H
Result	W	D	L	L	D	L	D	D	L	L	L	W	D	W	L	W	D	W	D	L

Updated to match(es) played on September 26, 2015. Source: nwslsoccer.com
A = Away; H = Home; W = Win; D = Draw; L = Loss

== Squad statistics ==
Source: NWSL

Key to positions: FW – Forward, MF – Midfielder, DF – Defender, GK – Goalkeeper

N	Pos	Player	GP	GS	Min	G	A	WG	Shot	SOG	Cro	CK	Off	Foul	FS	YC	RC
18	DF	Lindsi Lisonbee Cutshall	18	18	1571	0	0	0	4	1	1	0	1	7	3	0	0
12	MF	Kim DeCesare	9	4	395	0	0	0	6	3	0	1	1	8	3	1	0
(Note: Number 44 was later assigned to Nikki Stanton)44	MF	Theresa Diederich	3	0	18	0	0	0	0	0	0	0	1	1	0	0	0
16	FW	Jonelle Filigno	5	1	98	0	0	0	2	1	0	0	1	4	2	0	0
4	DF	Caitlin Foord	10	10	895	0	0	0	5	1	1	0	1	9	11	1	0
10	MF	Katy Freels	20	20	1754	5	2	0	33	14	1	26	2	15	25	1	0
25	DF	CoCo Goodson	3	0	47	0	0	0	0	0	0	0	0	0	0	0	0
2	MF	Shawna Gordon	13	10	768	0	0	0	7	3	1	10	3	4	10	0	0
13	DF	Kristin Grubka	14	14	1214	0	1	0	5	3	0	1	0	6	4	1	0
17	DF	Hayley Haagsma	16	15	1339	1	1	0	15	2	0	1	0	15	6	2	0
11	FW	Maya Hayes	13	10	899	0	1	0	8	4	1	0	2	5	7	0	0
20	FW	Samantha Kerr	9	9	766	6	2	1	38	15	1	0	8	4	5	0	0
14	MF	Sarah Killion	17	13	1233	0	1	0	3	1	2	4	0	10	15	3	0
42	FW	Lo'eau LaBonta	6	0	80	0	0	0	2	0	0	0	1	0	1	0	0
22	DF	Cami Levin	19	18	1605	0	1	0	5	3	4	0	4	10	11	0	1
6	MF	Taylor Lytle	15	11	962	0	1	0	18	6	3	1	3	4	2	1	0
32	MF	Meg Morris	9	4	453	0	1	0	7	2	0	1	3	7	3	0	0
9	FW	Nadia Nadim	18	18	1551	6	1	3	51	26	2	0	24	34	15	2	0
19	DF	Kelley O'Hara	11	11	989	3	5	1	26	14	0	29	2	8	13	1	0
33	DF	Shade Pratt	1	0	20	0	0	0	0	0	0	0	0	1	0	0	0
3	DF	Christie Rampone	11	11	962	1	0	0	3	2	0	0	0	2	4	0	0
44	MF	Nikki Stanton	9	3	352	0	0	0	2	1	0	0	0	10	4	1	0
34	MF	Maruschka Waldus	1	0	8	0	0	0	0	0	0	0	0	0	0	0	0

N	Pos	Goal keeper	GP	GS	Min	W	L	T	Shot	SOG	Sav	GA	GA/G	Pen	PKF	SO
21	GK	Aubrey Bledsoe	1	0	8	0	0	0	2	2	1	1	1	0	0	0
1	GK	Brittany Cameron	20	20	1792	5	8	7	263	114	87	27	1.35	2	3	4

== See also ==
- 2015 National Women's Soccer League season
- 2015 in American soccer
