= Ashley Baker =

English footballer

Personal information
- Full name: Ashley Lauren Baker
- Date of birth: 15 March 1990 (age 36)
- Place of birth: Grantham, England
- Height: 1.78 m (5 ft 10 in)
- Position: Goalkeeper

College career
Years	Team	Apps	(Gls)
2008–2012	Georgia Bulldogs		

Senior career*
Years	Team	Apps	(Gls)
2013	Sky Blue FC	1	(0)

International career
	England U-19	2	(0)
	England U-23	4	(0)
Medal record
Women's football
Representing Great Britain
Summer Universiade
Gold medal – first place	2013 Kazan	Team
- * Club domestic league appearances and goals

Ashley Lauren Baker (born 15 March 1990) is an English former soccer goalkeeper. She played for Sky Blue FC in the National Women's Soccer League (NWSL).

== Club career ==
English FA WSL club Lincoln Ladies announced that they had agreed to sign Baker in October 2012, but the transfer fell through when Lincoln later signed Karen Bardsley.

Instead, Baker joined Sky Blue FC in 2013 after being drafted from University of Georgia. She made her debut on 1 June 2013 against Boston Breakers, in which she saved a penalty kick from compatriot Lianne Sanderson in stoppage time. In August 2013 Baker was waived by Sky Blue, who needed the roster space to sign Ashley Nick.

== International career ==
She was part of the England U-19 for the 2008 and 2009 edition of the UEFA Women's Under-19 Championship. She was also involved in the 2008 and 2010 edition of the FIFA U-20 Women's World Cup.

In July 2013 Baker helped Great Britain to a gold medal in the 2013 Summer Universiade in Kazan, Russia.

== Career statistics ==
Appearances and goals by club, season and competition
Club	Season	League			Playoffs (Note: Includes NWSL playoffs)		Total	
Club	Season	Division	Apps	Goals	Apps	Goals	Apps	Goals
Sky Blue FC	2013	NWSL	1	0	0	0	1	0
Career total			1	0	0	0	1	0

== Honours ==
England U-19

- UEFA Women's Under-19 Championship: 2009
