= Lindsi Cutshall =

American former soccer defender

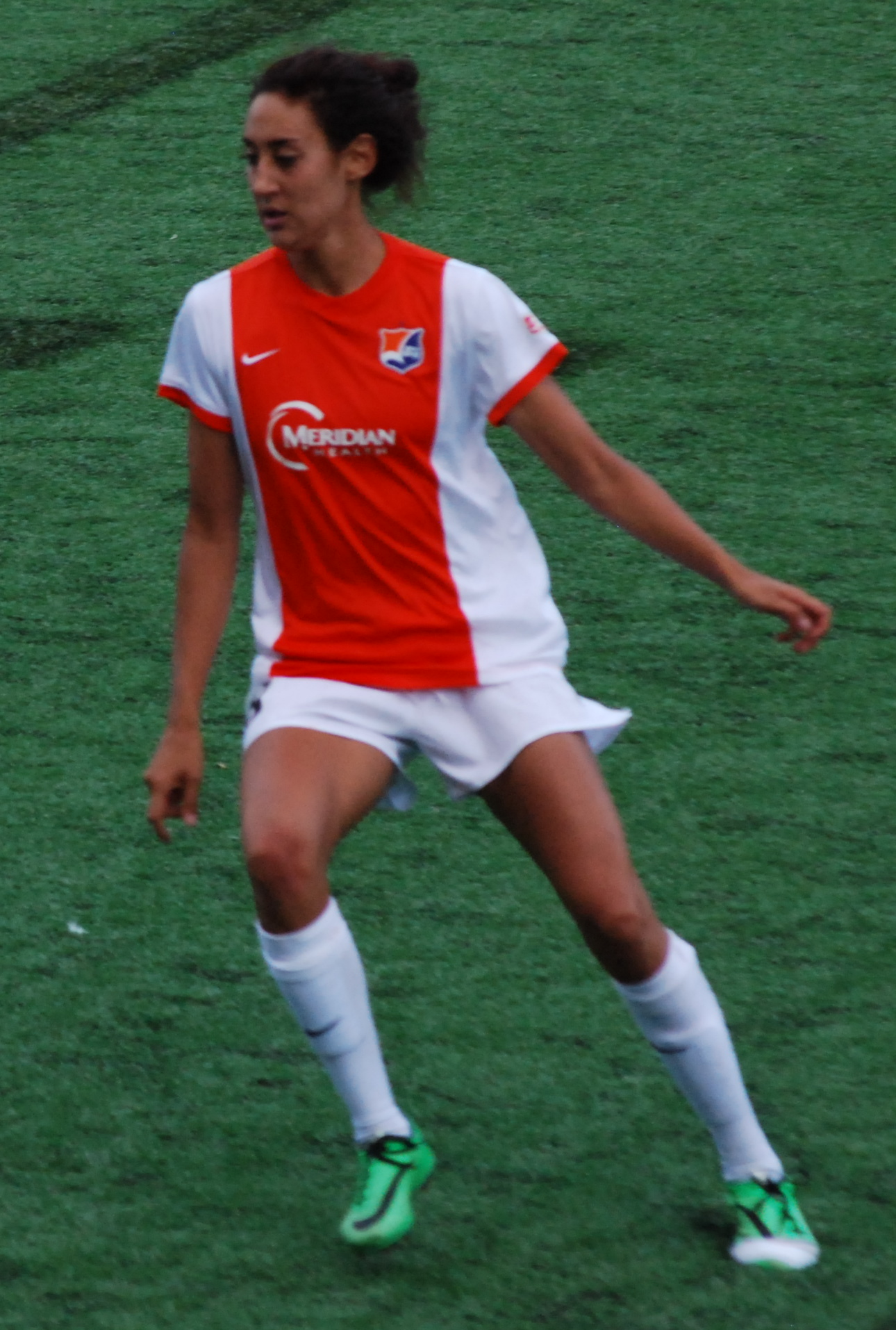

Personal information
- Full name: Lindsi Louise Cutshall
- Birth name: Lindsi Louise Lisonbee
- Date of birth: October 18, 1990 (age 36)
- Place of birth: Park City, Utah, United States
- Height: 5 ft 10 in (1.78 m)
- Position: Defender

College career
Years	Team	Apps	(Gls)
2009–2012	BYU Cougars		

Senior career*
Years	Team	Apps	(Gls)
2013–2015	Sky Blue FC	39	(3)

International career
2010	United States U-20		
2013	United States U-23		
- * Club domestic league appearances and goals

Lindsi Louise Cutshall (née Lisonbee; born October 18, 1990) is an American former soccer defender for Sky Blue FC in the National Women's Soccer League (NWSL).

== Early life ==
Born to Mark and Terri Lisonbee, Lindsi was raised with her two siblings in Park City, Utah, where she attended and played for Park City High School. She was named to the 1st Team All-State in 2005, 2006, and 2008, was a Parade All-American in 2008, NSCAA Youth All-American 2006 and 2007, and a High School State Champion in 2005. She played for the Black Diamond Soccer club Team and helped them achieve a top 25 national ranking, Score at the Shore Champions (2006), US Club Region G Champions (2006), US Club National Cup Semi-Finalists (2006), and San Diego Surf Thanksgiving Cup Champions (2008).

== College career ==
Cutshall attended BYU where she majored in Recreation Management and Youth Leadership with an emphasis in Leisure Services Management. Coming into her freshman year, Cutshall was a Top Drawer Soccer top 15 recruit. While at BYU, she totaled 32 points off 13 goals and anchored the BYU defense. In 2012, Cutshall was named the West Coast Conference Player of the Year, was a MAC Hermann Trophy finalist and was selected to the NSCAA All-America First Team. She was a part of the 2012 BYU women's soccer team that allowed a mere 13 goals all season long and advanced all the way to the Elite 8 and a #2 National ranking.

== Club career ==
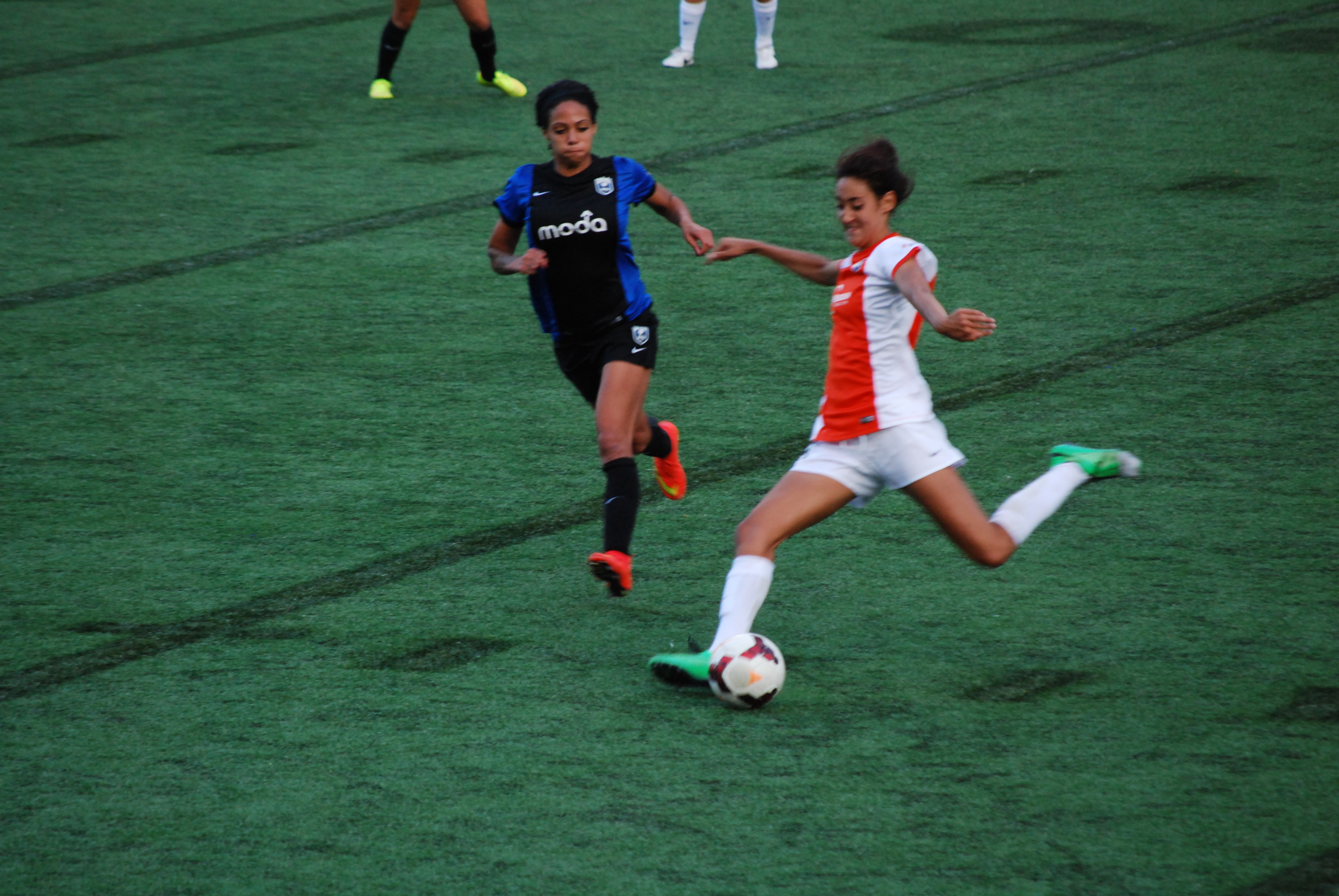
Cutshall defends against Sydney Leroux during a match against Seattle Reign FC on June 28, 2014, in Seattle, WA

Cutshall was the fourth overall pick in the inaugural National Women's Soccer League draft, going to Sky Blue FC.

She sat out the 2016 season.

== International career ==
Cutshall was named to the 20-player United States U-23 roster that represented the United States in the Four Nations Tournament in La Manga, Spain from February 22 – March 5, 2013.

== Personal life ==
Cutshall is a member of the Church of Jesus Christ of Latter-day Saints (LDS Church). She married Rich Cutshall in the summer of 2012.

== Career statistics ==
Appearances and goals by club, season and competition
Club	Season	League			Playoffs (Note: Includes NWSL playoffs)		Total	
Club	Season	Division	Apps	Goals	Apps	Goals	Apps	Goals
Sky Blue FC	2013	NWSL	7	0	1	0	8	0
Sky Blue FC	2014	NWSL	14	3	—		14	3
Sky Blue FC	2015	NWSL	18	0	—		18	0
Career total			39	3	1	0	40	3
