= Nicola Williams (soccer) =

Australian association football (soccer) coach and former player

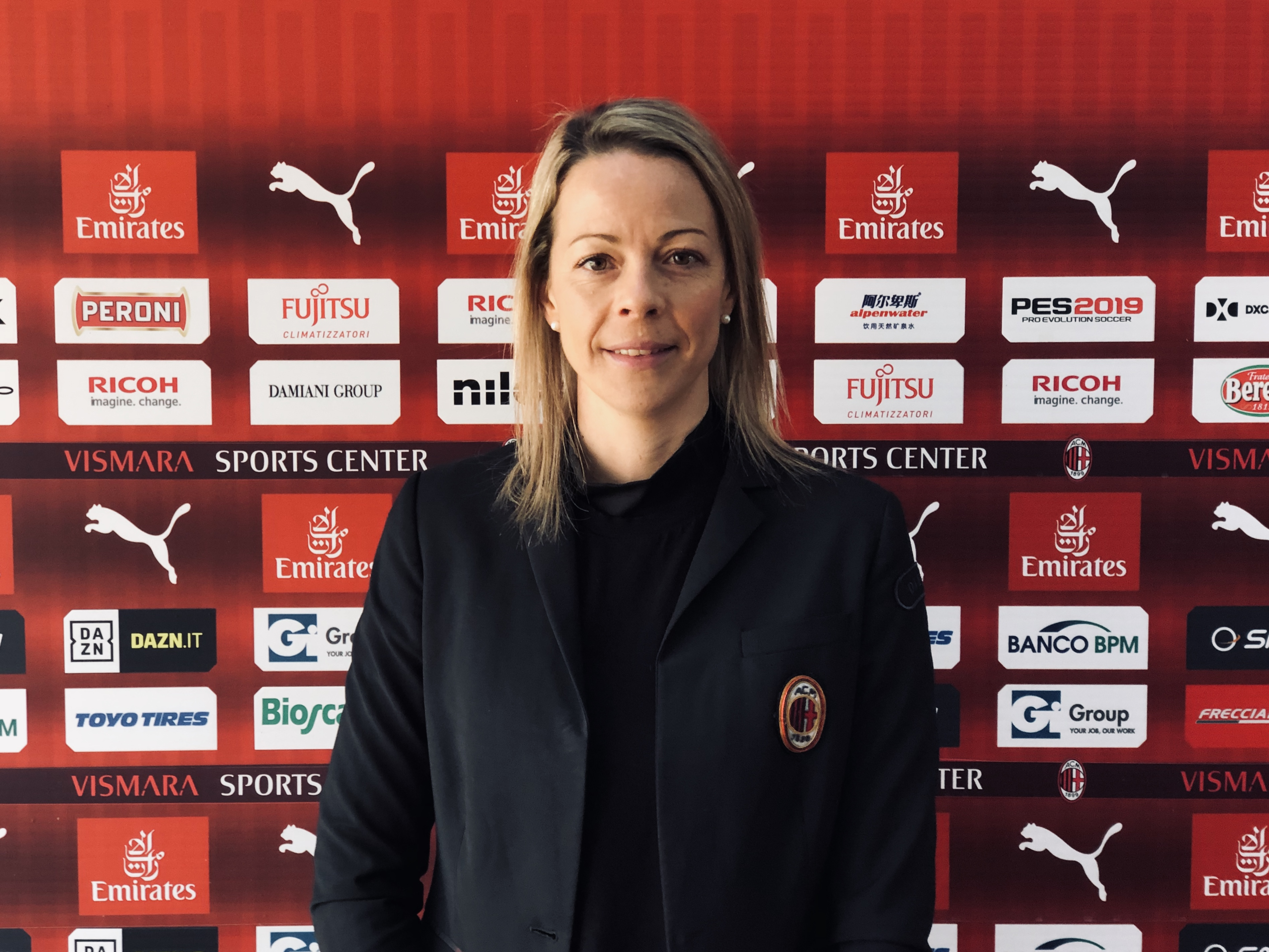

Personal information
- Full name: Nicola Jane Williams
- Date of birth: 4 June 1982 (age 44)
- Place of birth: Lancaster, England

Senior career*
Years	Team	Apps	(Gls)
1994–1996	Sorrento Women's Soccer Club	44	(4)
1997–2016	Northern Redbacks (Stirling Reds)	354	(132)
2000–2010	Western Australia State Womens Team	114	(24)

Managerial career
- 2003–2017: Lynwood Senior High
- 2007–2008, 2010: WA U17 Girls
- 2010–2012: WA U19 State School Girls
- 2007–2009: Football West National Training Centre U19
- 2008–2009: Perth Glory Women
- 2010: Australia U14 Women (Assistant) & Australia U13 Women (Manager)
- 2011–2012: Australia U17 Women (Assistant)
- 2010–2014: Australia U20 Women (Assistant)
- 2013: Juventus Academy Roma
- 2014: Female Football Academy
- 2017: Trinidad & Tobago U-20 Women (Coach) & T&T Women (Assistant)
- 2018-19: AC Milan Women's Team (Assistant)
- 2020-21: SS Lazio Women's Team (Assistant)
- 2022: Leicester City Women (Assistant)
- 2023: Papua New Guinea Women (Assistant)
- 2023: London City Lionesses
- * Club domestic league appearances and goals

Nicola Jane Williams (born 4 June 1982) is an Australian association football (soccer) coach and former player. Nicola Williams holds an Asian Football Confederation (AFC) and Football Australia "PRO" Coaching Licence accreditation and UEFA A Licence from Coverciano in Italy.

== Career ==
Prior to the commencement of the Australian W-League, Williams played for the State School girls, WA State Women's Team and the Western Waves in the Australian Women's National Soccer League until 2005. She captained National Premier League team Northern Redbacks.

== Coaching career ==
Nicola Williams received an inaugural Elite Coaching Scholarship from FFA (now Football Australia) and presented her report at the 2010 FFA National Coaching Conference. She spent time studying training and coaching sessions by Pia Sundhage, at the United States women's national soccer team Camp and Emma Hayes, former coach of the Chicago Red Stars and currently with Chelsea F.C. Women.

At the 2012 Women's U20 World Cup in Japan, Williams was invited to an Elite Coaches Workshop and met Carolina Morace, FIFA Instructor and Ambassador and former coach of the Canadian and Italian Women's National Teams. The pair began working together at Juventus Academy Roma, Female Football Academy and Pro Soccer Coaching

== 2008-09 season ==
Williams began her coaching career as the head coach of Australian W-League team Perth Glory in their 2008–2009 inaugural season, who improved to be a top 4 performing side in the second half of the season.

== National teams ==
Williams spent more than 6 years with the Australia Women's National Football Team; assistant coach of the National Young Matildas U20 team for 4 years following her roles as the head coach of the Australian Girls U13 team in 2010 and assistant U17 Women's National Team coach in 2012. winning Silver in the 2013 Asean Football Conference.

In 2017 Williams was appointed Trinidad and Tobago Women's National Team assistant coach and U20 head coach.

In 2022/2023 Williams joined the Papua New Guinea Women's National Team to help them qualify for the FIFA WWC.

== 2018-19 season ==
Williams signs as assistant with the inaugural AC Milan women's team in the Italian Serie A. After leading the first round table and defeating Juventus 3-0 the team finish 3rd in their first season.

== 2021-22 season ==
In February 2021 Morace & Williams sign with S.S Lazio, winning the league and gaining promotion for the women's team from Serie B to Serie A in 2022 for the first time in their history.

== 2022-23 season ==
In July 2022 Williams was appointed assistant manager at Leicester City Women who participate in the English Women's Super League.

== 2023-24 season ==
In June 2023 Williams was appointed Assistant Manager at London City Lionesses, Later in July 2023 she was joined by Morace who was appointed club manager

== Personal life ==
Born in England she moved to Australia at a young age and found her love for sports representing her state in tennis, volleyball, hockey and football (soccer). At the age of only 16, Williams began her studies in Sports Science at the University of Western Australia as a scholarship recipient. Deciding to follow her families footsteps, she completed a Graduate Diploma in Education to become a Teacher. Williams was awarded a National Excellence in Teaching Award in 2006 and Level 3 Status in 2012.

On 11 October 2020, it was revealed Williams married Italian footballer Carolina Morace, with whom she celebrated the wedding twice—first in Bristol, on the SS Great Britain in July 2014, and the second in Australia in May 2019.
