= Maddie Thompson =

American soccer player

Personal information
- Full name: Madeleine Dale Thompson
- Date of birth: April 24, 1991 (age 35)
- Place of birth: Corvallis, Oregon
- Height: 5 ft 8 in (1.73 m)
- Position: Defender

College career
Years	Team	Apps	(Gls)
2009–2012	Stanford Cardinal		

Senior career*
Years	Team	Apps	(Gls)
2013–2014	Sky Blue FC	16	(0)
- * Club domestic league appearances and goals

Madeleine Dale Thompson (born April 24, 1991) is an American former soccer defender who played for Sky Blue FC in the National Women's Soccer League (NWSL).

== Early life ==
Thompson attended and played for Corvallis High School in Corvallis, Oregon. While at Corvallis, Thompson lettered four years in soccer, lettered twice in track and three times on the downhill ski racing team. She also won four league soccer championships, reached the 2007 state soccer semifinals, and was on the 2007 state championship ski team. Thompson was named to the 2008 5A All-State second team by The Oregonian and awarded her high school's Award of Excellence for exemplary sportsmanship, ethics and integrity and is also her high school's freshman record-holder in the 1,500 meters in track. Thompson played club for the FC Willamette Pride, four-time Oregon State Cup semifinalists and played on the Oregon Olympic Development Program team.

== College career ==
Thompson attended Stanford University where she majored in Industrial and Product Design. Played soccer for four years at Stanford and spent the winter quarter of 2012 in Florence, Italy.

== Club career ==
Thompson was signed by Sky Blue FC as a discovery player before the start of the inaugural National Women's Soccer League season. Thompson's role for Sky Blue was as a late in the second half sub.

On September 25, 2014, she announced her retirement.

== Personal life ==
Thompson's parents are Eric and Carrie Thompson. Thompson has an older sister and a twin brother. Thompson plays the flute and was at one time the only high school member of the Oregon State University Symphony.

== Career statistics ==
Appearances and goals by club, season and competition
Club	Season	League			Playoffs (Note: Includes NWSL playoffs)		Total	
Club	Season	Division	Apps	Goals	Apps	Goals	Apps	Goals
Sky Blue FC	2013	NWSL	14	0	0	0	14	0
Sky Blue FC	2014	NWSL	2	0	—		2	0
Career total			16	0	0	0	16	0

== Honors ==
Stanford Cardinal

- NCAA Division I women's soccer tournament: 2011
