= Western Waves FC =

- Full name: Western Waves Football Club
- Founded: 2004
- Dissolved: 2005
- Ground: Perth Oval
- Capacity: 20,500
- Owner: Football WA
- Chairman: Unknown
- Senior Women's Manager: Alistair Edwards
- League: Women's National Soccer League
- 2004: 7th (7)

The Western Waves Football Club were a short-lived West Australian women's soccer club that played only one season in the former Women's National Soccer League.

== History ==
For the first seven years of the Women's National Soccer League the competition had been fielded by the same six clubs, with two in New South Wales and one each from Queensland, the ACT, Victoria and South Australia. It was a welcomed move when it was announced that a seventh club would be joining the competition for the 2004 season, the Western Waves from Perth, Western Australia. However, due to financial constraints with the league, governing body (then Soccer Australia) and with the new club itself, they would only play 6 out of the 11 league games, ruling them out of being able to fight for a position in the finals series

Nevertheless, the Waves set about trying to field the strongest squad they could with the limited resources that they could draw upon. Alistair Edwards (former Perth Glory and Socceroo player) was announced as the coach of the club. On the field, the club recruited Perth local and Matilda Lisa De Vanna, as well as up and coming talented players like Collette McCallum, Hayley Crawford and Nicola Williams.

The Waves' first match of the 2004 WNSL season resulted in a 2–1 defeat to Queensland Sting at Queensland Sport and Athletics Centre. The only win of their shortened season was a 1–0 win against Canberra Eclipse, with the Waves finishing the season in last place on 5 points.

== 2004/05 Squad ==
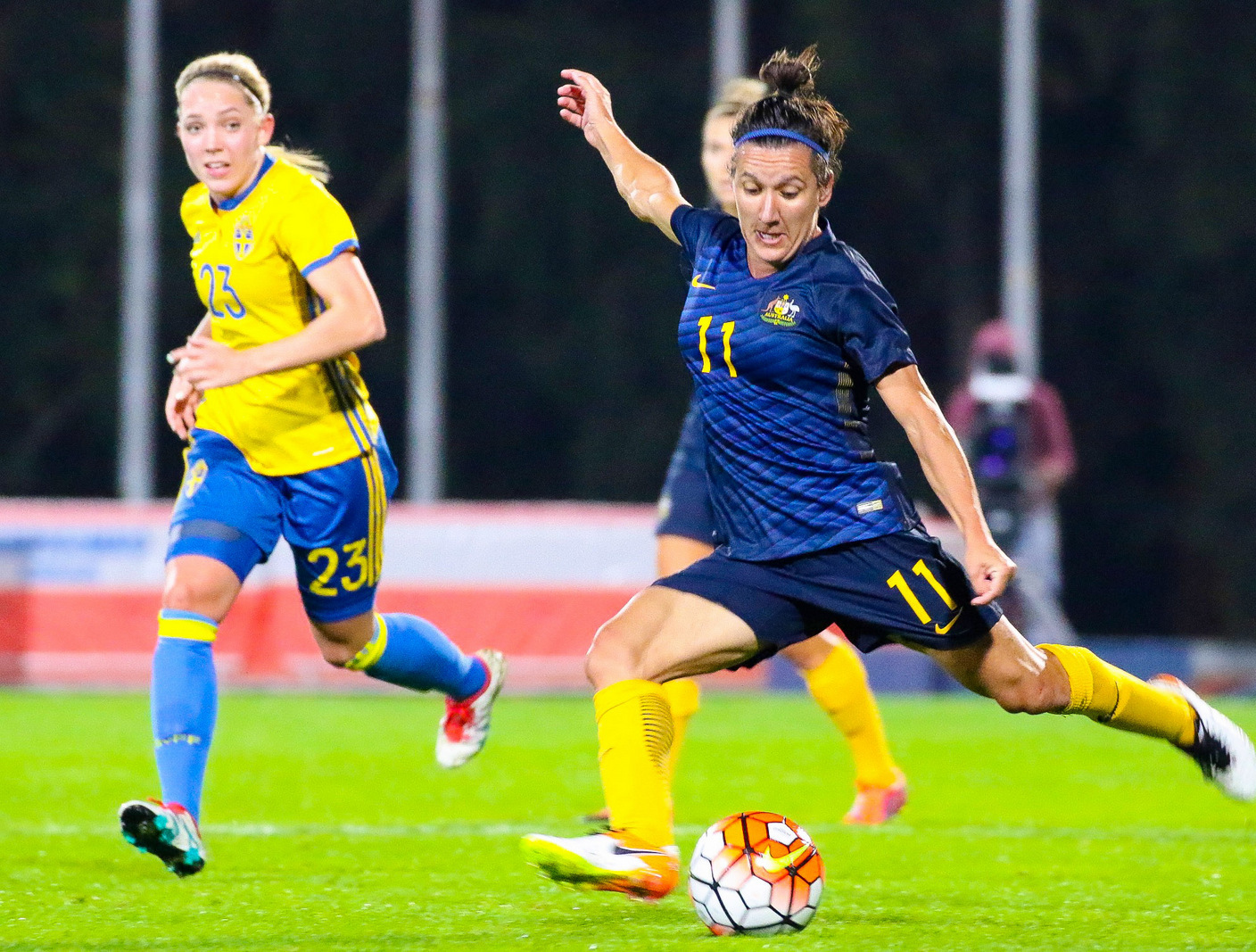
Lisa De Vanna was a star member of the squad

Note: Flags indicate national team as defined under FIFA eligibility rules; some limited exceptions apply. Players may hold more than one non-FIFA nationality.

No.	Pos.	Nation	Player
1	GK	AUS	Ashley Bennett
3	DF	AUS	Nicola Williams
5	DF	AUS	Stacey Woodfin
6	MF	AUS	Tal Karp
7	MF	AUS	Collette McCallum
8	DF	AUS	Tanya Oxtoby
9	FW	AUS	Kylie Chatto
10	MF	AUS	Hayley Crawford
11	FW	AUS	Lisa De Vanna

No.	Pos.	Nation	Player
12	DF	AUS	Luciana Colangelo
13	DF	AUS	Lindsey Jobling
15	MF	AUS	Laura Turnbul
16	MF	AUS	Nadia Poulsen
17	MF	AUS	Sara Gawned
18	FW	AUS	Ciara Conway
19	FW	AUS	Kylie Woodhouse
20	GK	AUS	Nadia Perica
21	MF	AUS	Steph Grant
