= Hayley McCall =

American soccer player

Personal information
- Full name: Hayley Danielle McCall
- Birth name: Hayley Danielle Haagsma
- Date of birth: March 14, 1992 (age 34)
- Place of birth: Cerritos, California
- Height: 5 ft 7 in (1.70 m)
- Position: Defender

Youth career
- 2006–2009: Valley Christian High School
- 2009–2010: Laguna Hills Eclipse

College career
Years	Team	Apps	(Gls)
2010–2013	Texas Tech Red Raiders	69	(6)

Senior career*
Years	Team	Apps	(Gls)
2014–2015	Sky Blue FC	16	(1)

International career
- United States U-18
- * Club domestic league appearances and goals

Hayley Danielle McCall (née Haagsma; born March 14, 1992) is an American professional soccer defender. She played for Sky Blue FC of the NWSL.

== Early life ==
Haagsma attended Valley Christian High School in Cerritos, California.

== College career ==
Haagsma attended Texas Tech University, where she played for the Red Raiders.

== Club career ==
Haagsma signed with Sky Blue FC for the 2014 season with an option for the 2015 season. During the first 2014 preseason game her ACL tore, sidelining her for the 2014 NWSL season.

In February 2016, she retired from professional soccer.

== Career statistics ==
Appearances and goals by club, season and competition
Club	Season	League			Playoffs (Note: Includes NWSL playoffs)		Total	
Club	Season	Division	Apps	Goals	Apps	Goals	Apps	Goals
Sky Blue FC	2014	NWSL	Did not play					
Sky Blue FC	2015	NWSL	16	1	—		16	1
Career total			16	1	0	0	16	1
