= 2012 WPS Draft =

The 2012 WPS College Draft took place on January 13, 2012. It was the fourth college draft held by Women's Professional Soccer to assign the WPS rights of college players to the American-based teams.

== Format ==
Official WPS release

- The 2012 WPS Draft consists of four rounds and 23 picks overall.
- Draft order is based on the reverse order of the 2011 regular season standings.
- Teams will be allotted three minutes per pick in the first two rounds and five minutes per pick in the second two rounds.

== Round 1 ==
Pick	Player	Pos.	WPS Team	Previous Team
1	Sydney Leroux	F	Atlanta Beat	UCLA
2	Melissa Henderson	F	Sky Blue FC	Notre Dame
3	Stephanie Ochs	F	Boston Breakers	University of San Diego
4	Camille Levin	M	Sky Blue FC	Stanford
5	Sarah Hagen	F	Philadelphia Independence	University of Wisconsin–Milwaukee
6	Lindsay Taylor	F	Western New York Flash	Stanford
7	Teresa Noyola	M	Western New York Flash	Stanford

== Round 2 ==
Pick	Player	Pos.	WPS Team	Previous Team
8	Tori Huster	M	Western New York Flash	Florida State
9	Ingrid Wells	M	Sky Blue FC	Georgetown
10	Katy Frierson	M	Atlanta Beat	Auburn
11	Courtney Jones	F	Boston Breakers	North Carolina
12	CoCo Goodson	D	Philadelphia Independence	University of California, Irvine
13	Toni Pressley	F	Philadelphia Independence	Florida State

== Round 3 ==
Pick	Player	Pos.	WPS Team	Previous Team
14	Bianca Henninger	GK	Philadelphia Independence	Santa Clara
15	Jillian Mastroianni	GK	Sky Blue FC	Boston College
16	Melinda Mercado	D	Boston Breakers	Oklahoma State
17	Danielle Foxhoven	F	Philadelphia Independence	Portland
18	Tahnai Annis	M	Western New York Flash	Florida

== Round 4 ==
Pick	Player	Pos.	WPS Team	Previous Team
19	Laura Heyboer	F	Sky Blue FC	Michigan State
20	Jessica Luscinski	F	Boston Breakers	Boston University
21	Jasmyne Spencer	F	Philadelphia Independence	Maryland
22	Erica Henderson	D	Western New York Flash	West Virginia
23	Kate Deines	M	Atlanta Beat	Washington

== Draft Notes ==
WPS transactions pages '10 '11 '12
