= Manya Makoski =

American soccer player

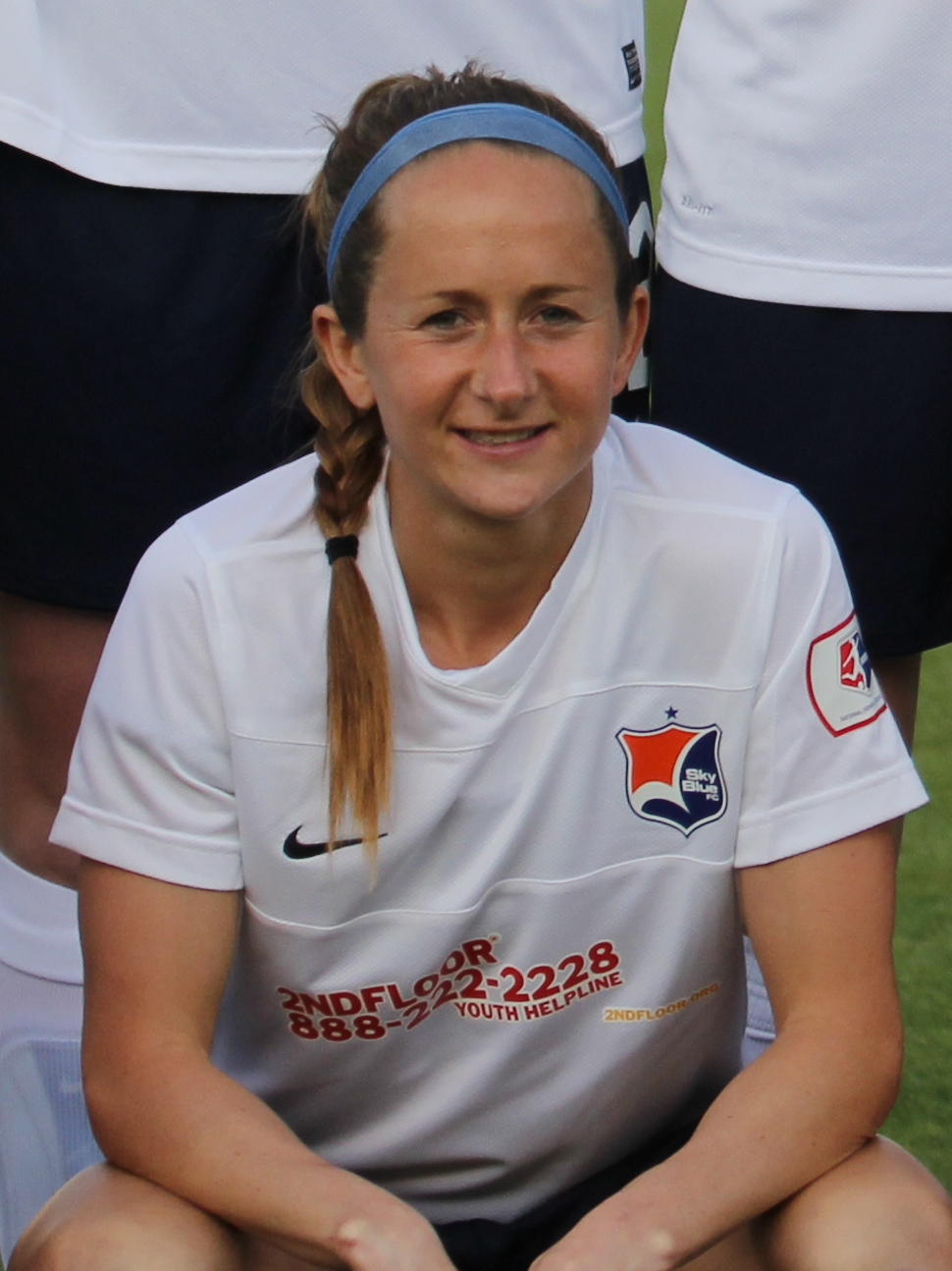
- Makoski in 2013

Personal information
- Full name: Manya Janine Makoski
- Date of birth: April 18, 1984 (age 42)
- Place of birth: Bridgeport, Connecticut, U.S.
- Height: 5 ft 4 in (1.63 m)
- Position: Midfielder

College career
| Years | Team | Apps | (Gls) |
| 2002–2005 | Arizona State Sun Devils | | |

Senior career*
| Years | Team | Apps | (Gls) |
| 2004–2006 | New Jersey Wildcats | 9 | (7) |
| 2008 | SoccerPlus Connecticut | | |
| 2008 | Pali Blues | 0 | (0) |
| 2009–2010 | Los Angeles Sol | 17 | (0) |
| 2010–2011 | Atlanta Beat | | (0) |
| 2011 | Thor/ KA Akureyri | 21 | (13) |
| 2012 | Aland United | 26 | (31) |
| 2013 | Sky Blue FC | 20 | (0) |

International career^{‡}
| 2000–2002 | United States U-19 | | |
| 2003–2007 | United States U-21 | | |
- * Club domestic league appearances and goals as of 20:21, May 20, 2013 (UTC) ‡ National team caps and goals as of 20:21, September 24, 2009 (UTC)

Manya Janine Makoski (born April 18, 1984) is a retired American professional soccer midfielder who most recently played for Sky Blue FC in the National Women's Soccer League. She previously played for the Los Angeles Sol and Atlanta Beat of Women's Professional Soccer.

== Early life ==
Makoski was born in Bridgeport, Connecticut to parents, Milton and Mary Makoski. She attended Trumbull High School in Trumbull, Connecticut, where she helped lead the Eagles to four Connecticut FCIAC final championships as well as 1998, 1999, 2001 Connecticut Class LL state championships.

Makoski graduated Trumbull as a well-decorated player, having been named 2002 Gatorade Connecticut High School Player of the Year, 2001 NSCAA Adidas Connecticut High School Player of the Year, 2001 Parade All-American, 2000-2001 NSCAA All-American, 2000-01 Hartford Courant Player of the Year, 2001 Connecticut CJSA State Player of the Year, 2000 New Haven Register MVP, 2000–2001, Connecticut Post MVP, and 2000 FCIAC final MVP. She was named to the 2001 NSCAA Adidas U-17 All-American team and was a 2001 Adidas Elite Soccer Program participant (top-150 players in the country). In 2000–2001, she was named to the All-New England team and all-state team and was a Region I Olympic Development Program (ODP) team member.

=== Arizona State University ===
Makoski attended Arizona State University and was third all-time in game-winning goals (3), fifth all-time in assists (16) and seventh all-time in goals (6) and points (48) for the Sun Devils. She became one of only three Sun Devils all-time to be honored as an Academic All-American in 2004.

As a freshman during the 2002 season, Makoski played in 19 games with 17 starts, missing the first two games due to U-19 National Team commitments. She ended the year first on the team in assists (9) and second in goals (6), points (21) and game-winning goals (2). Makoski earned Soccer American Freshman All-American, Soccer Buzz first-team Freshman All-American honors and was named to the All-Pac-10 second team, Soccer Buzz second-team All-West Region, and Soccer Buzz All-Freshman (West Region) team. She was named one of 12 finalists for the 2002 National Freshman of the Year by Soccer Buzz Magazine and set the ASU single-season record with nine assists, also good for third in the Pac-10.

In 2003, Makoski started in all 21 games, scoring four goals, including two game-winners against San Francisco and Oregon. She tallied five assists, finishing fourth on the team with 13 points. She earned second-team All-Pac-10 honors and received Honorable Mention All-Pac-10 Academic honors.

In 2004, she led the team in game-winning goals (3), shots on goal (26), and shots (53) after starting in all 19 games. She was selected to Soccer Buzz's All-Region first team, earned first-team All-Pac-10 honors, and Academic All-American second-team honors from the NSCAA. She was named to the Academic All-District VIII second team and Pac-10 All-Academic second team.

== Playing career ==
=== Club ===
==== New Jersey Wildcats ====
Makoski was a member of the 2004 W-League runner-up New Jersey Wildcats and tallied seven goals for the team. She was one of two players to score a penalty kick in overtime of the championship game.

==== Los Angeles Sol (WPS) ====
Makoski was selected 19th overall (5th pick in 3rd round) in the 2008 WPS General Draft. She played 18 games, starting 16, for a total of 1443 minutes, helping the team to the number one spot during the 2009 WPS season.

==== Atlanta Beat (WPS) ====
Makoski was selected ninth overall (1st pick in 2nd round) in the Los Angeles Sol Dispersal Draft. Due to an ACL injury, who was listed as an injured reserve for the season.

==== Aland United ====
In 2012 Makoski played for Åland United in Finnish first tier Naisten Liiga. She was the league's top scorer with 31 goals in 26 games as her team finished second. Makoski was also nominated as the player of the season.

==== Sky Blue FC (NWSL) ====
On February 2, 2013, it was announced that Makoski signed as a free agent to the Sky Blue FC in the National Women's Soccer League. During the regular season, she started in 19 of the 20 matches in which she appeared helping the team to a fourth-place position and a spot in the semi-finals.

In October 2013, she announced her retirement from professional soccer.

=== International ===
Makoski represented the United States on several youth national teams from 2001 to 2005. From 2001 to 2002, she was a member of the U-19 National Team and was part of the 2002 U-19 World Cup Team that won the FIFA World Championships in Edmonton, Alberta, Canada.

As a member of the member of the 2003 U-21 National Team, she scored the game-winning goal against the WUSA's San Diego Spirit.

In 2004, representing the United States U-21 National Team, Makoski helped the team clinch their sixth straight Nordic Cup title against Sweden in Iceland, tallying two assists with the team.

In 2005, she won her third straight Nordic Cup as a member of the United States Under-21 National Team, who defeated Norway 4–1 in the final.

== Coaching career ==
Makoski has a varied coaching background including assistant and goalkeeper coach for the University of New Haven and staff head coach for girlsCAN Football in Connecticut, an organization led by a number of "female professional and national team level players, passionate about providing the top levels of coaching for the next generation." She has also coached at the youth level for the United States Youth Soccer League and Connecticut Junior Soccer Association (CJSA) as well as the Olympic Development Program (ODP). Makoski has helped lead camps for the Tiffany Weimer Soccer Academy, WPS Camps, and Kristine Lilly Soccer Academy.

On April 11, 2016, the University of Maryland athletic department announced Makoski's hiring as an assistant for the women's soccer team.
