= Lisa De Vanna =

Australian soccer player (born 1984)

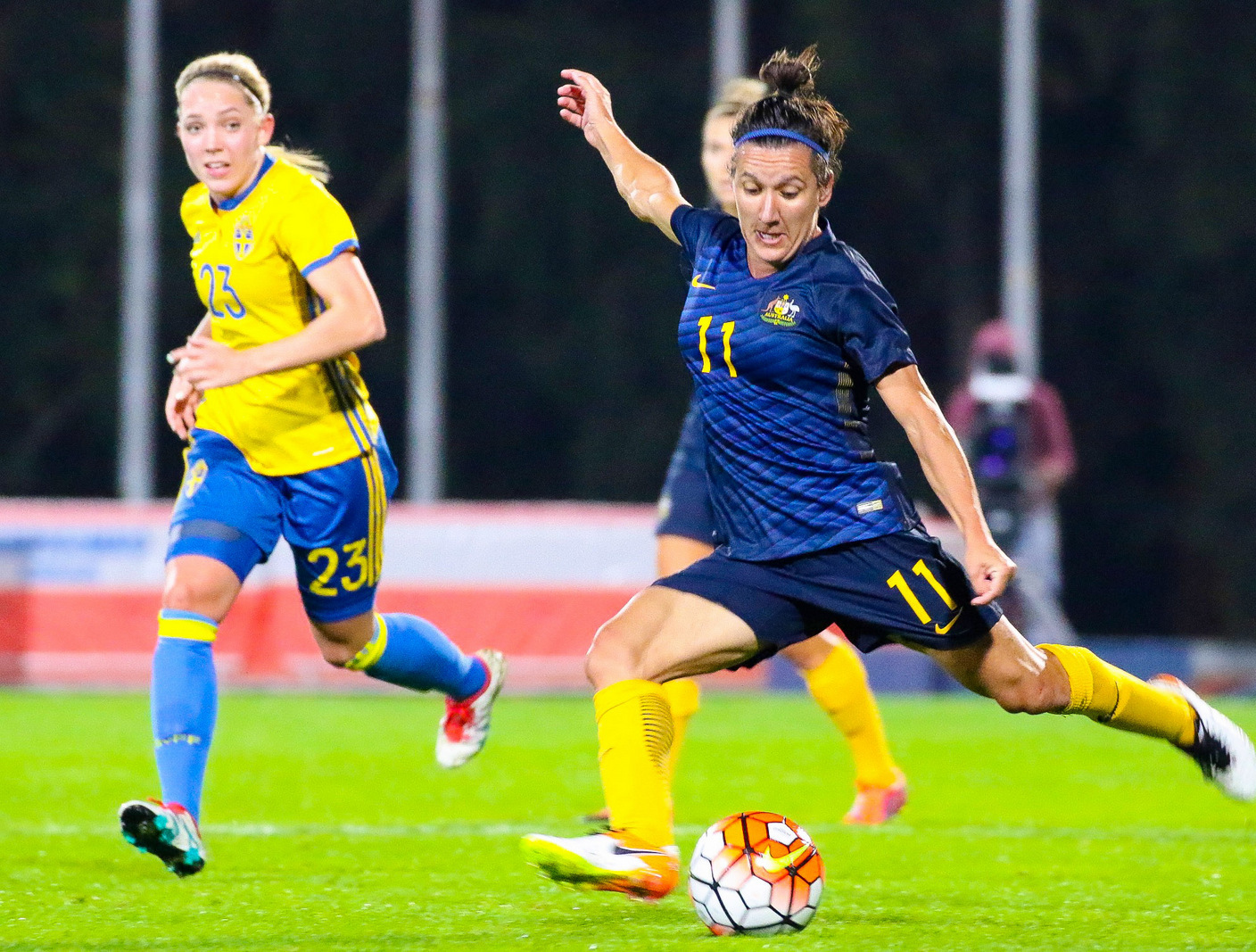
- De Vanna playing for Australia at the 2017 Algarve Cup

Personal information
- Full name: Lisa Marie De Vanna
- Date of birth: 14 November 1984 (age 42)
- Place of birth: Perth, Western Australia, Australia
- Height: 1.56 m (5 ft 1 in)
- Position: Forward

Youth career
- AIS
- SASI
- Spearwood United
- Cockburn United
- Murdoch
- Stirling Reds/ Northern Redbacks

Senior career*
Years	Team	Apps	(Gls)
2001–2004	Adelaide Sensation		
2004–2008	Western Waves		
2006–2007	Doncaster Rovers Belles		
2008	AIK	19	(15)
2008–2009	Perth Glory	7	(3)
2009–2010	Washington Freedom	21	(7)
2009	→ Perth Glory (loan)	8	(2)
2010–2011	Brisbane Roar	9	(4)
2011	magicJack	8	(3)
2011–2012	Newcastle Jets	9	(5)
2012	Linköping	22	(7)
2012–2013	Perth Glory	7	(4)
2013	Sky Blue FC	16	(5)
2013–2014	Melbourne Victory	14	(8)
2014	Boston Breakers	6	(0)
2014	Washington Spirit	11	(1)
2014–2015	Melbourne Victory	11	(3)
2015–2016	Melbourne City	9	(3)
2016	North Shore Mariners	3	(0)
2016	Orlando Pride	3	(0)
2016–2017	Canberra United	6	(0)
2017	South Melbourne	16	(18)
2017–2019	Sydney FC	24	(6)
2019–2020	Fiorentina	14	(5)
2020–2021	Melbourne Victory	12	(3)
2021–2022	Perth Glory	13	(0)

International career
2002	Australia U-20	1	(0)
2004–2019	Australia	150	(47)
- * Club domestic league appearances and goals

Lisa Marie De Vanna (born 14 November 1984) is an Australian former professional soccer player who played as a forward. She played for Adelaide Sensation, Western Waves, Doncaster Rovers Belles, AIK, Perth Glory, Washington Freedom, Brisbane Roar, magicJack, Newcastle Jets, Linköping, Sky Blue FC, Melbourne Victory, Boston Breakers, Washington Spirit, Melbourne City, North Shore Mariners, Orlando Pride, Canberra United, South Melbourne, Sydney FC, and Fiorentina as well as representing the Australian national team 150 times. She is noted for her pace and dribbling skills. She has been regularly considered one of the greatest female footballers in the world; football analyst and former Socceroo Craig Foster stated that she "ran on jet-fuel; burning up twice as fast, but with incredible impact."

== Early life ==
De Vanna was born in Perth, Western Australia to a Portuguese mother and an Italian father. She was born and raised in the small port city of Fremantle, located about 30 minutes southwest of Perth. De Vanna developed her love for the game of football at a young age and has said that she slept with her soccer ball and spent much of her time as a youth playing soccer in the street with her brother.

De Vanna is a Portuguese speaker.

== Club career ==
=== Doncaster Rovers Belles L.F.C., 2006–07 ===
In October 2006 De Vanna signed for Doncaster Rovers Belles, departing the English Premier League club in March 2007.

=== AIK Fotboll Dam, 2008 ===
De Vanna played for Swedish club AIK for the 2008 Damallsvenskan season. De Vanna had a very successful season, being the 5th highest goalscorer with 15 goals, helping AIK to their most successful season.

=== Perth Glory, 2008–09 ===
In November 2008, De Vanna was signed to Perth Glory in the Australian W-League and made her first appearance for the club on 8 November 2008 against the Melbourne Victory.

=== Washington Freedom / magicJack, 2009–11 ===
In September 2008, De Vanna was selected by Washington Freedom in Women's Professional Soccer. She was the 18th overall selection in the 2008 WPS International Draft. She officially signed for the Freedom in late March 2009. Through the next three years, she played for Washington Freedom and its successor magicJack in the WPS as well as Perth Glory, Brisbane Roar and Newcastle Jets in the W-League in Australia.

=== Linköping FC, 2012 ===
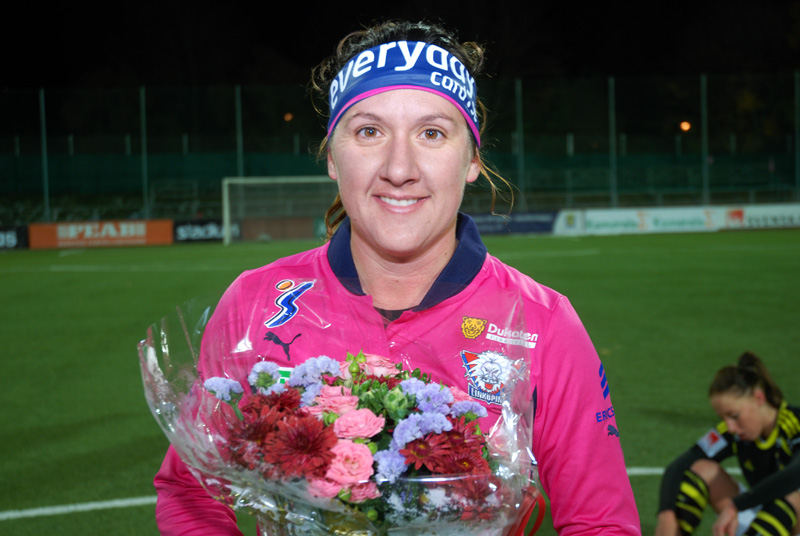
De Vanna with Linköping in 2012

After the WPS suspended operations, De Vanna signed for Damallsvenskan club Linköpings FC. She scored five goals in her first eight games including a hat trick against Piteå IF on 3 June 2012. During a match against Kopparberg/Göteborg FC on 14 October 2012, she scored the game-winning goal in the 82nd minute helping her team win 3–2. Linköping finished third during the regular season with an 11–6–5 record. De Vanna finished the 2012 season having started in 18 of the 22 matches in which she played and scored seven goals.

=== Sky Blue FC, 2013 ===
On 1 February 2013, it was announced that De Vanna signed with Sky Blue FC for the inaugural season of the National Women's Soccer League, the top division in the United States. In June 2013, De Vanna scored a bicycle kick goal and was named the league's Player of the Week. Her goal garnered international attention and went viral on websites like YouTube and soccer-related websites. She was also voted NWSL Fans' Choice MVP for Week 8. During a game against the Western New York Flash on 21 July 2013, De Vanna was sidelined with a hamstring injury. De Vanna started in 16 of the 17 games in which she played and scored five goals. Sky Blue finished in fourth during the regular season with a 10–6–6 record.

=== Melbourne Victory, 2013–14 ===
In October 2013, it was confirmed that De Vanna had signed for Melbourne Victory for the 2013–14 W League season.

=== Boston Breakers, 2014 ===
On 3 March 2014, Sky Blue FC traded De Vanna to the Boston Breakers in exchange for a 2014 international roster spot and the Breakers' first-round 2015 college draft pick, which became Sarah Killion.

=== Washington Spirit, 2014 ===
On 18 June 2014, the Boston Breakers traded De Vanna to Washington Spirit in exchange for defender and Mexican international Bianca Sierra and the Spirit's fourth and fifth round 2015 college draft picks.

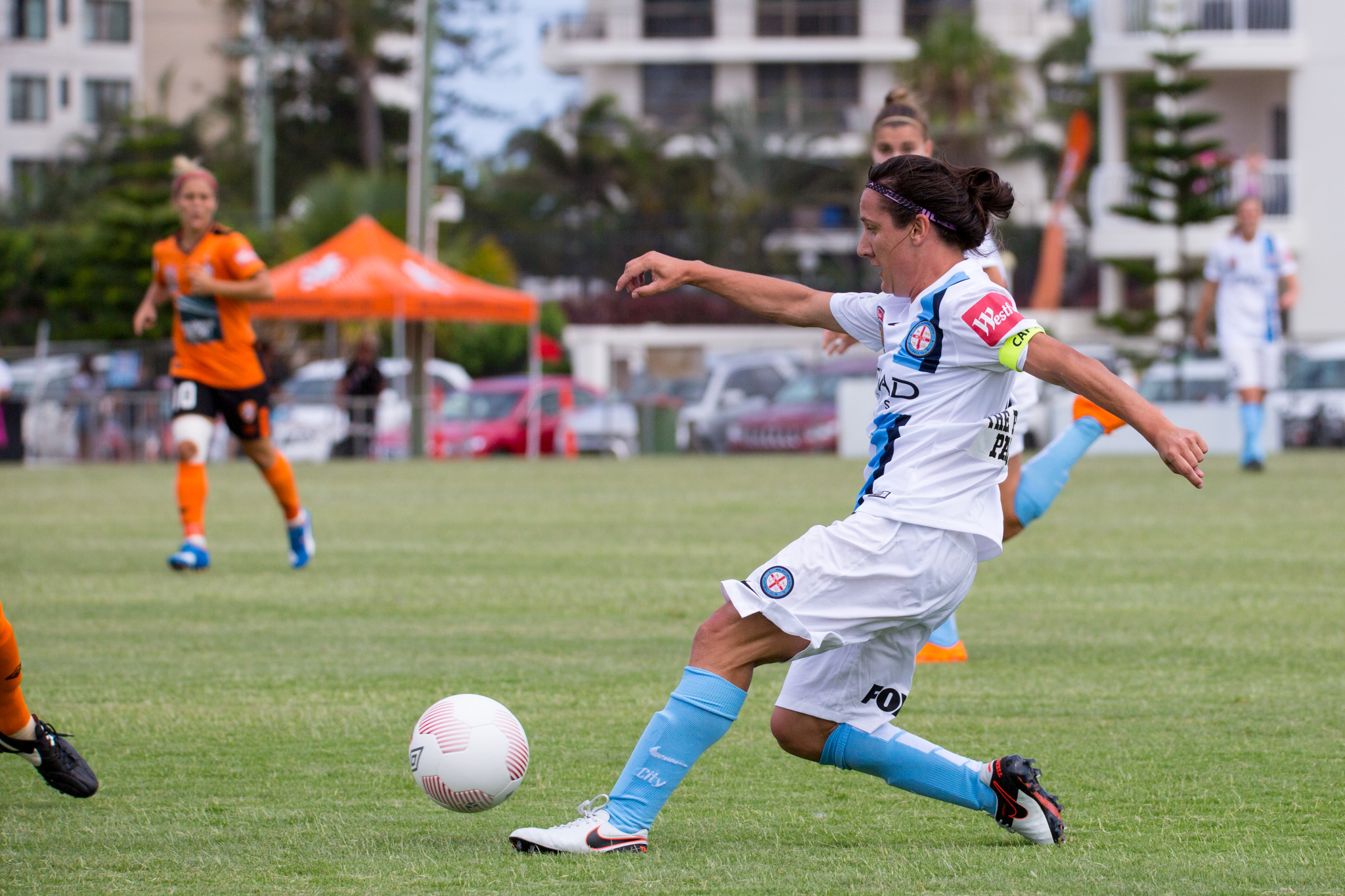
De Vanna in action for Melbourne City against Brisbane Roar, 2015.

=== Melbourne Victory, 2014–15 ===
In September 2014 it was confirmed that De Vanna signed to play with Melbourne Victory again.

=== Melbourne City, 2015–16 ===
Having played a season with the Victory, De Vanna was lured across the city to Victory's A-League rivals, Melbourne City, becoming the brand new W-League side's very first signing.

=== Orlando Pride, 2016 ===
On 29 August 2016, De Vanna joined Orlando Pride. After playing three matches in the 2016 National Women's Soccer League season, she was waived by Orlando Pride before the 2017 National Women's Soccer League season.

=== Canberra United, 2016–17 ===
In December 2016, De Vanna joined Canberra United as a guest player for the remainder of the 2016–17 W-League season.

=== South Melbourne, 2017 ===
On 7 April 2017, De Vanna joined South Melbourne to play in the Women's National Premier League. She finished the season with 18 goals in 16 matches, including a 4-goal haul on 28 August 2017 in a 7–0 rout of Bulleen Lions.

=== Sydney FC, 2017–2019 ===
On 2 October 2017, De Vanna joined Sydney FC.

=== Fiorentina, 2019–2020 ===
In August 2019, De Vanna joined Italian club Fiorentina.

=== Melbourne Victory, 2020–2021 ===
In December 2020, De Vanna returned to the W-League, signing with Melbourne Victory once more. At the end of the season, she was named in the PFA's W-League Team of the Season together with five team-mates.

=== Perth Glory, 2021–2022 ===
A couple of months after announcing her international retirement, De Vanna decided to return to the game, re-joining her former club Perth Glory. The decision was in part related to the efforts of coach Alex Epakis and chairman Tony Sage to foster a safe, supportive, and respectful environment at the club. Over her W-League career she made 130 appearances and provided 42 goals from 2008/09 to 2021/22.

== International career ==
De Vanna played four games at the 2004 Olympic Football Tournament.

She scored four goals for Australia in the 2007 World Cup — one in a 1–1 draw against Norway, two in a 4–1 victory against Ghana, and one against Brazil in her team's 2–3 loss in the quarterfinals. Each goal she scored at the World Cup was dedicated to her father, who died three months before the tournament began.

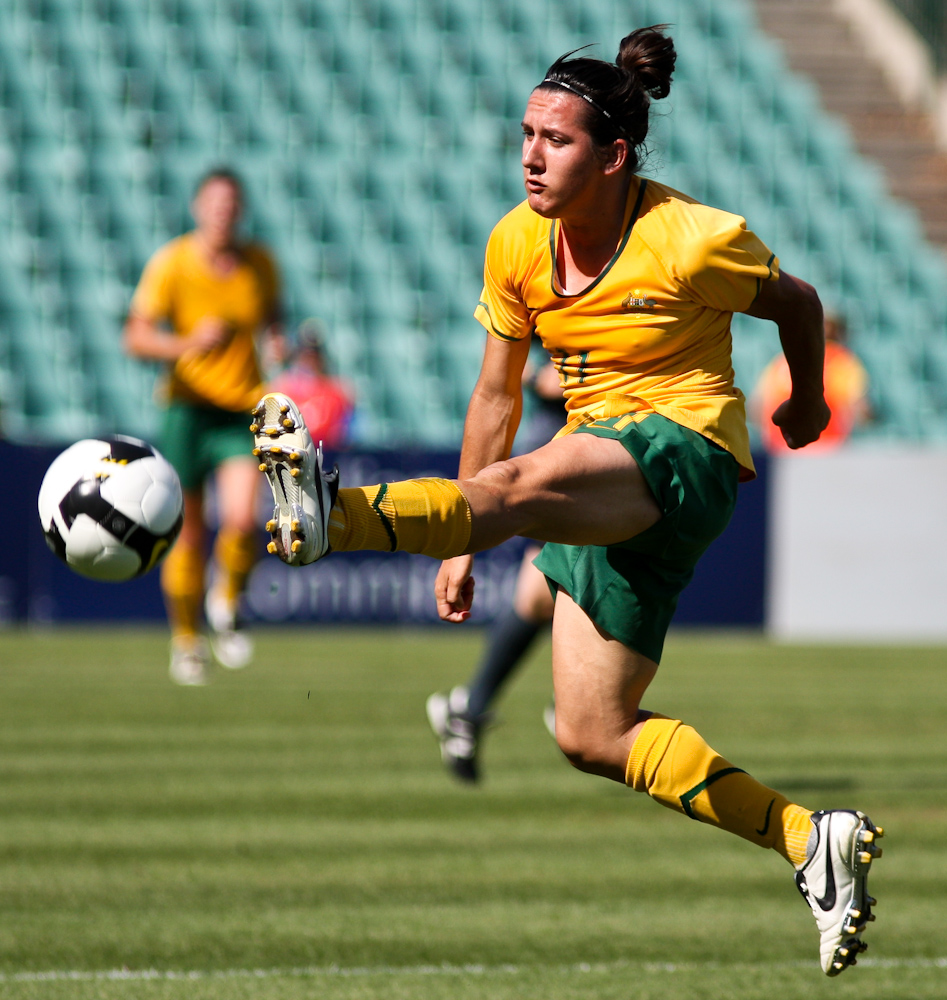
De Vanna playing for Australia in 2009

On 1 October 2007 Lisa was named in the FIFA's Women's World Cup All Star Team and she was also nominated for the 2007 FIFA World Player of the Year award. She was named Western Australian Sportswoman of the Year in 2007. After returning home after the World Cup De Vanna returned to a job at a petrol station.

In May 2011 De Vanna was sent home from a training camp held to prepare the national team for the World Cup. Australian coach Tom Sermanni stated that the expulsion was for an unacceptable standard of behaviour. The previous September, De Vanna had been subject to a complaint after photographs involving a large inflatable penis were posted to her Facebook page. She was censured by Football Federation Australia and instructed to remove the offending pictures. De Vanna moved to Sweden for the 2012–13 season, but discussed that her desire to play for the Matildas was then stronger than ever.

On 8 June 2015 De Vanna captained the Matildas in her 100th game, scoring their only goal in a 3–1 defeat to the United States in the 2015 FIFA Women's World Cup. During a match against Brazil in the 2016 Olympics, a moment of De Vanna and teammate Elise Kellond-Knight went viral when during a short break, De Vanna absentmindedly tried to drink from the wrong end of a water bottle, prompting Kellond-Knight to quickly flip it in her hand.

Lisa De Vanna competed in four FIFA Women's World Cup tournaments: China 2007, Germany 2011, Canada 2015, and France 2019 and two Olympics: Athens 2004 and Rio 2016; altogether played 23 matches and scored 8 goals at those six global tournaments. At France 2019, in their group stage win (4–1) against Jamaica, she played her last international game to become the second Australian soccer player (male or female) to reach 150 appearances. As from June 2026, De Vanna is the second highest goal scorer in Matildas history after Sam Kerr, with 47.

== Managerial ==
De Vanna was appointed as a Technical Assistant for the FFV National Training Centre in September 2018.

== In popular culture ==
=== Television and film ===
External videos
- Aussies Abroad: The Matildas (ESPN) retrieved 12/18/2013

Leading up to the 2011 FIFA Women's World Cup, De Vanna was the focus of an ESPN documentary, Unstoppable, directed by award-winning filmmaker, Safina Uberoi. In 2013, she was featured in an hour-long episode of ESPN's Aussies Abroad entitled, The Matildas, which profiled four Australian national team players (De Vanna, Samantha Kerr, Kyah Simon, and Caitlin Foord) and their experience playing internationally.

== Career statistics ==
=== International goals ===
Key (expand for notes on "international goals" and sorting)
Location	Geographic location of the venue where the competition occurred Sorted by country name first, then by city name
Lineup	Start – played entire match on minute (off player) – substituted on at the minute indicated, and player was substituted off at the same time off minute (on player) – substituted off at the minute indicated, and player was substituted on at the same time (c) – captain Sorted by minutes played
#	NumberOfGoals.goalNumber scored by the player in the match (alternate notation to Goal in match)
Min	The minute in the match the goal was scored. For list that include caps, blank indicates played in the match but did not score a goal.
Assist/pass	The ball was passed by the player, which assisted in scoring the goal. This column depends on the availability and source of this information.
penalty or pk	Goal scored on penalty-kick which was awarded due to foul by opponent. (Goals scored in penalty-shoot-out, at the end of a tied match after extra-time, are not included.)
Score	The match score after the goal was scored. Sorted by goal difference, then by goal scored by the player's team
Result	The final score. Sorted by goal difference in the match, then by goal difference in penalty-shoot-out if it is taken, followed by goal scored by the player's team in the match, then by goal scored in the penalty-shoot-out. For matches with identical final scores, match ending in extra-time without penalty-shoot-out is a tougher match, therefore precede matches that ended in regulation
aet	The score at the end of extra-time; the match was tied at the end of 90' regulation
pso	Penalty-shoot-out score shown in parentheses; the match was tied at the end of extra-time
	Green background color – exhibition or closed door international friendly match
	Yellow background color – match at an invitational tournament
	Red background color – Olympic women's football qualification match
	Light-blue background color – FIFA women's world cup qualification match
	Pink background color – Olympic women's football tournament
	Blue background color – FIFA women's world cup final tournament
NOTE: some keys may not apply for a particular football player

Goal	Date	Location	Opponent	Score	Result	Competition
1.	4 March 2004	Govind Park, Ba, Fiji	Papua New Guinea	3–0	10–0	2004 Olympics qualifying
2.	4 March 2004	Govind Park, Ba, Fiji	Papua New Guinea	5–0	10–0	2004 Olympics qualifying
3.	2 July 2004	Chinese Football Association National Training Centre, Beijing, China	China	1–0	1–1	Friendly
4.	20 August 2004	Panthessaliko Stadium, Volos, Greece	Sweden	1–2	1–2	2004 Olympics
5.	28 January 2005	Quanzhou Sports Center, Quanzhou, China	Germany	1–0	1–0	2005 Four Nations Tournament
6.	1 February 2005	Quanzhou Sports Center, Quanzhou, China	Russia	2–0	5–0	2005 Four Nations Tournament
7.	23 July 2005	Tokyo, Japan	Japan	1–0	2–4	Friendly
8.	28 May 2006	Bob Jane Stadium, Melbourne, Australia	Mexico	3–0	3–0	Friendly
9.	16 July 2006	Hindmarsh Stadium, Adelaide, Australia	South Korea	4–0	4–0	2006 AFC Women's Asian Cup
10.	18 July 2006	Hindmarsh Stadium, Adelaide, Australia	Myanmar	2–0	2–0	2006 AFC Women's Asian Cup
11.	24 July 2006	Hindmarsh Stadium, Adelaide, Australia	Thailand	5–0	5–0	2006 AFC Women's Asian Cup
12.	22 July 2007	BCU International Stadium, Coffs Harbour, Australia	New Zealand	1–0	1–0	Friendly
13.	16 August 2007	Tianjin Olympic Center Stadium, Tianjin, China	China	2–0	3–2	Friendly
14.	12 September 2007	Yellow Dragon Stadium, Hangzhou, China	Ghana	2–0	4–1	2007 FIFA Women's World Cup
15.	12 September 2007	Yellow Dragon Stadium, Hangzhou, China	Ghana	3–1	4–1	2007 FIFA Women's World Cup
16.	15 September 2007	Yellow Dragon Stadium, Hangzhou, China	Norway	1–1	1–1	2007 FIFA Women's World Cup
17.	23 September 2007	Tianjin Olympic Center Stadium, Tianjin, China	Brazil	1–2	2–3	2007 FIFA Women's World Cup
18.	29 May 2008	Thống Nhất Stadium, Ho Chi Minh City, Vietnam	Chinese Taipei	4–0	4–0	2008 AFC Women's Asian Cup
19.	31 May 2008	Thống Nhất Stadium, Ho Chi Minh City, Vietnam	South Korea	2–0	2–0	2008 AFC Women's Asian Cup
20.	31 January 2009	Parramatta Stadium, Sydney, Australia	Italy	1–0	2–2	Friendly
21.	17 February 2010	North Harbour Stadium, Auckland, New Zealand	New Zealand	3–0	3–0	Friendly
22.	20 February 2010	Bill McKinlay Park, Auckland, New Zealand	New Zealand	2–0	3–0	Friendly
23.	3 March 2010	Spencer Park, Brisbane, Australia	North Korea	2–1	2–2	Friendly
24.	21 May 2010	Chengdu Sports Centre, Chengdu, China	South Korea	2–0	3–1	2010 AFC Women's Asian Cup
25.	3 July 2011	Ruhrstadion, Bochum, Germany	Equatorial Guinea	3–1	3–2	2011 FIFA Women's World Cup
26.	11 September 2011	Shandong Provincial Stadium, Jinan, China	South Korea	1–1	2–1	2012 Olympics qualifying
27.	16 September 2012	Home Depot Center, Los Angeles, United States	United States	1–0	1–2	Friendly
28.	19 September 2012	Dick's Sporting Goods Park, Denver, United States	United States	1–1	2–6	Friendly
29.	20 November 2012	Bao'an Stadium, Shenzhen, China	Chinese Taipei	2–0	7–0	2013 EAFF Women's East Asian Cup preliminary round 2
30.	20 November 2012	Bao'an Stadium, Shenzhen, China	Chinese Taipei	4–0	7–0	2013 EAFF Women's East Asian Cup preliminary round 2
31.	27 November 2013	Parramatta Stadium, Sydney, Australia	China	1–0	2–1	Friendly
32.	14 May 2014	Thống Nhất Stadium, Ho Chi Minh City, Vietnam	Japan	2–0	2–2	2014 AFC Women's Asian Cup
33.	11 March 2015	Paralimni Stadium, Paralimni, Cyprus	Czech Republic	3–1	6–2	2015 Cyprus Cup
34.	21 May 2015	Jubilee Oval, Sydney, Australia	Vietnam	4–0	11–0	Friendly
35.	21 May 2015	Jubilee Oval, Sydney, Australia	Vietnam	10–0	11–0	Friendly
36.	8 June 2015	Winnipeg Stadium, Winnipeg, Canada	United States	1–1	1–3	2015 FIFA Women's World Cup
37.	16 June 2015	Commonwealth Stadium, Edmonton, Canada	Sweden	1–0	1–1	2015 FIFA Women's World Cup
38.	29 February 2016	Kincho Stadium, Osaka, Japan	Japan	1–0	3–1	2016 Olympics qualifying
39.	7 June 2016	Docklands Stadium, Melbourne, Australia	New Zealand	1–1	1–1	Friendly
40.	9 August 2016	Itaipava Arena Fonte Nova, Salvador, Brazil	Zimbabwe	1–0	6–1	2016 Summer Olympics
41.	3 August 2017	StubHub Center, Carson, United States	Brazil	1–1	6–1	2017 Tournament of Nations
42.	3 August 2017	StubHub Center, Carson, United States	Brazil	3–1	6–1	2017 Tournament of Nations
43.	16 September 2017	Penrith Stadium, Sydney, Australia	Brazil	1–0	2–1	Friendly
44.	26 March 2018	nib Stadium, Perth, Western Australia	Thailand	2–0	5–0	Friendly
45.	26 March 2018	nib Stadium, Perth, Western Australia	Thailand	4–0	5–0	Friendly
46.	3 March 2019	Suncorp Stadium, Brisbane, Australia	South Korea	2–1	4–1	2019 Cup of Nations
47.	4 April 2019	Dick's Sporting Goods Park, Commerce City, United States	United States	1–1	3–5	Friendly

== Honours ==
Brisbane Roar

- W-League Championship: 2010–11

Melbourne Victory

- W-League Championship: 2013–14, 2020–21

Melbourne City

- W-League Championship: 2015–16
- W-League Premiership: 2015–16

Sydney FC

- W-League Championship: 2018–19

Australia U20

- OFC U-20 Women's Championship: 2002

Australia

- AFC Women's Asian Cup: 2010
- AFC Olympic Qualifying Tournament: 2016

Individual

- Women's National Soccer League's Young Player of the Year: 2001–02
- Julie Dolan Medal: 2002–03
- Women's National Soccer League Golden Boot: 2002–03
- FIFA Women's World Cup All-Star Team: 2007, 2015
- FIFA Puskás Award nominee: 2013
- FFA Female Footballer of the Year: 2013

== See also ==
- List of women's footballers with 100 or more international caps
- List of foreign Damallsvenskan players
- List of foreign NWSL players
