= CoCo Goodson =

American soccer defender (born 1990)

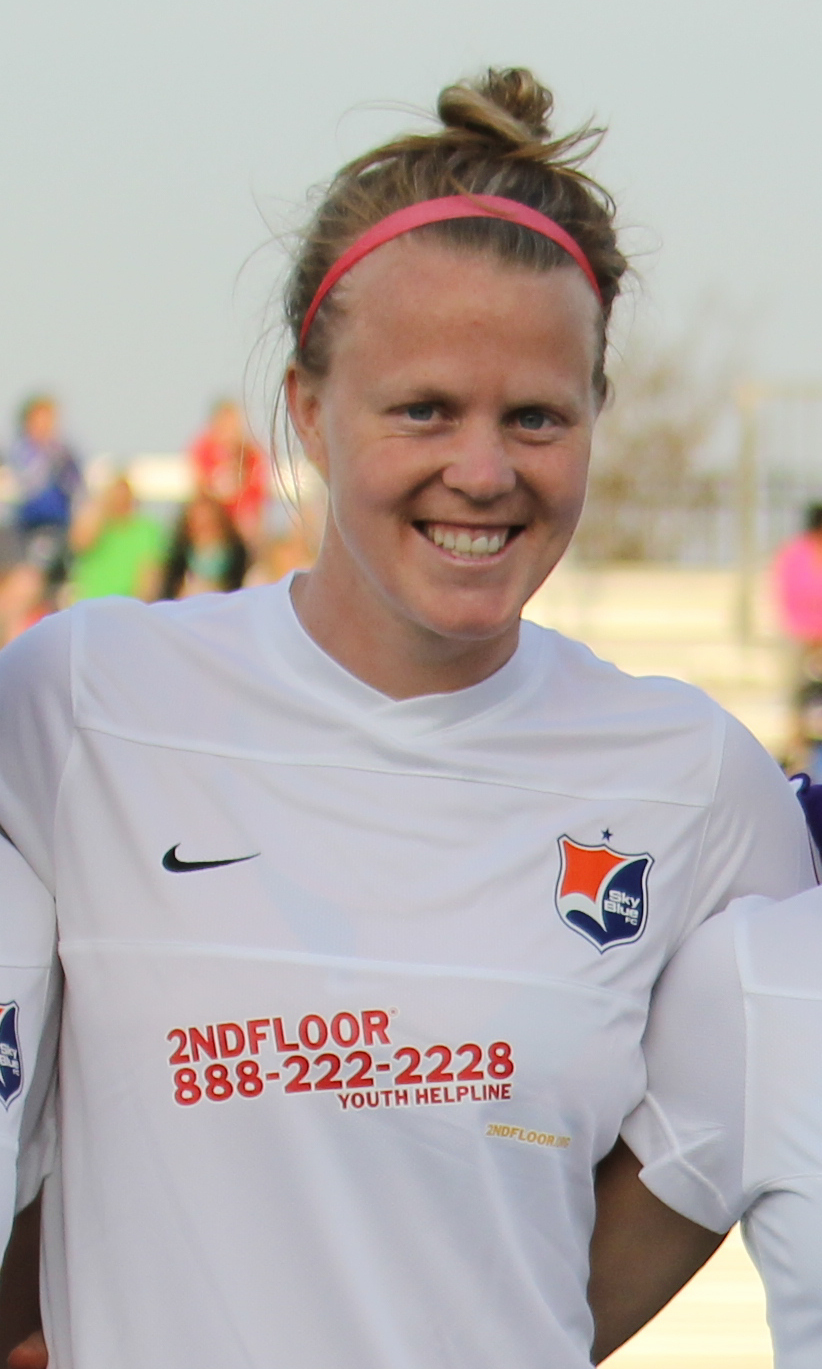

Personal information
- Full name: Courtney Kathryn Goodson
- Date of birth: June 19, 1990 (age 36)
- Place of birth: Ramona, San Diego County, California, United States
- Height: 5 ft 11 in (1.80 m)
- Position: Centre back

Youth career
- 2005–2008: Eagles Soccer Club

College career
Years	Team	Apps	(Gls)
2008–2009	Texas Longhorns		
2010–2011	UC Irvine Anteaters		

Senior career*
Years	Team	Apps	(Gls)
2010–2011	San Diego WFC SeaLions		
2012–2013	FC Twente	19	(1)
2013–2015	Sky Blue FC	43	(1)
- * Club domestic league appearances and goals as of March 9, 2015

Courtney Kathryn "CoCo" Goodson (born June 19, 1990) is an American soccer defender who last played for Sky Blue FC in the National Women's Soccer League. She previously played for FC Twente in the Dutch Eredivisie Vrouwen.

== Early life ==
Goodson was born in Ramona, California. She attended Cathedral Catholic High School where she was a four-year letterwinner and was named to the All-CIF First Team. She was a member of the CIF San Diego Section and Western League Championship teams from 2005 to 2007. Goodson was named All-North County twice and All-Western League twice. In 2005, she was named California Gatorade Rookie of the Year. In 2007, she was named to the Union-Tribune All-Academic Team.

=== University of California Irvine ===
After spending the first two years of her college career at the University of Texas where she played midfielder for the Texas Longhorns, Goodson transferred to the University of California, Irvine where she played for the UCI Anteaters from 2010 to 2011. During her two seasons at Irvine, the squad made it to the NCAA Tournament for the first two times in school history. Her skill helped improve Irvine's possession, elevating the team's scoring production from 37 without Goodson in 2009 to 49 goals during her junior season.

== Playing career ==
=== Club ===
==== FC Twente ====
After being drafted 12th overall in the 2012 WPS Draft to the Philadelphia Independence and the league folding before the season began, Goodson played for the Dutch professional side, FC Twente. She made 19 starts in 19 matches and scored one goal as a defender for the team.

==== Sky Blue FC ====
In 2013, Goodson was drafted to Sky Blue FC during the third round of the 2013 NWSL Supplemental Draft (21st overall) for the inaugural season of the National Women's Soccer League. During her second cap with the team playing the defender position, she scored her first goal in a match against the Washington Spirit helping her team secure a 2–1 win. Goodson ended the 2013 season having started in all 23 games that she played for Sky Blue and scored one goal.
