= Brittany Cameron =

American soccer player and coach (born 1986)

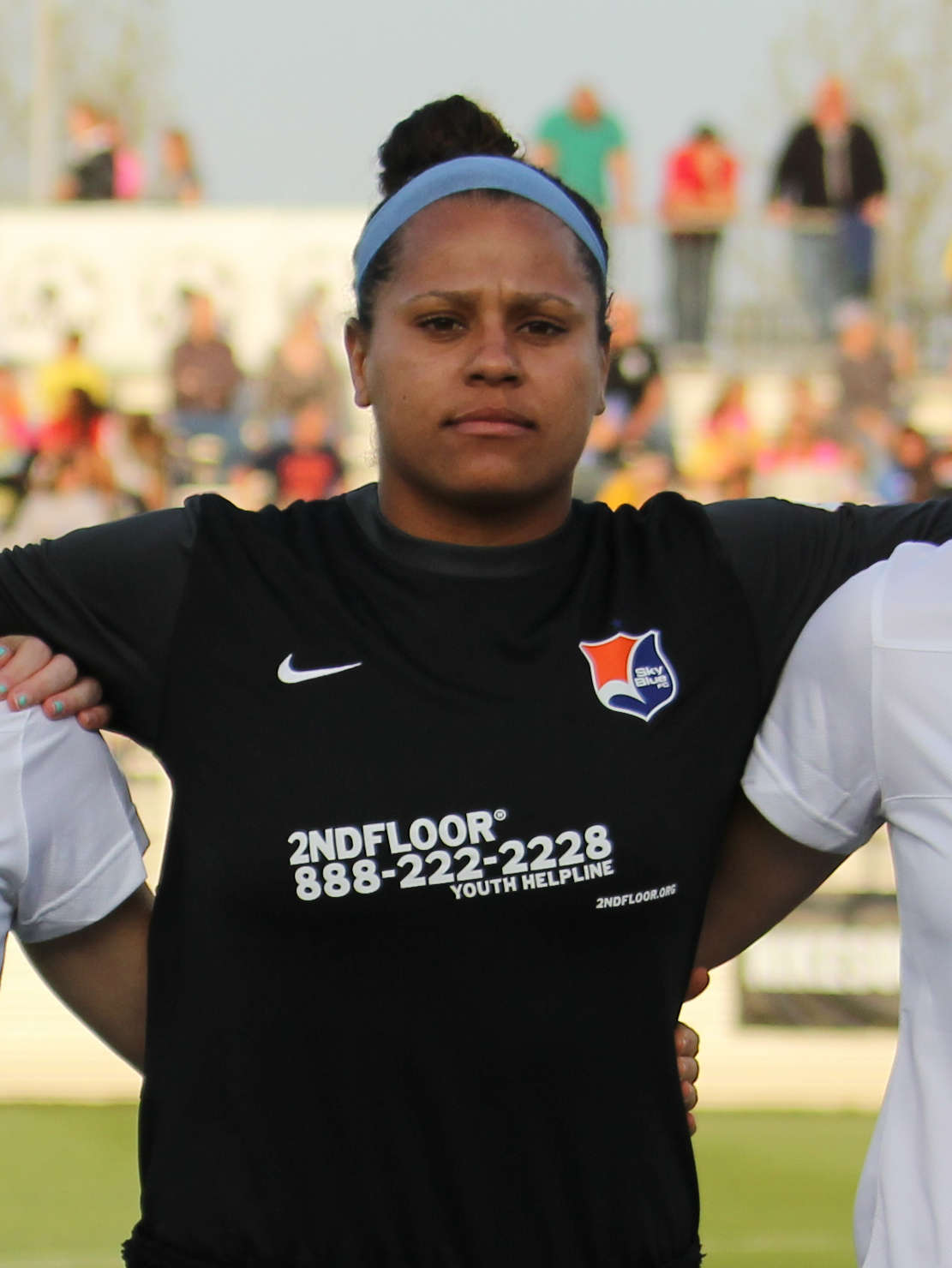
- Image of Brittany Cameron in Sky Blue FC

Personal information
- Full name: Brittany Taylor Cameron
- Date of birth: December 3, 1986 (age 39)
- Place of birth: San Leandro, California
- Height: 5 ft 8 in (1.73 m)
- Position: Goalkeeper

Team information
- Current team: California Storm

Youth career
- Dublin High Energy
- Pleasanton RAGE

College career
Years	Team	Apps	(Gls)
2005–2008	San Diego Toreros		

Senior career*
Years	Team	Apps	(Gls)
2009	Los Angeles Sol		
2010	FC Gold Pride	3	(0)
2011	Western New York Flash	0	(0)
2012	Western New York Flash		
2013–2015	Sky Blue FC	45	(0)
2013–2015	→ Vegalta Sendai (loan)	18	(0)
2015–2018	Vegalta Sendai		
2020	California Storm		

Managerial career
- 2009: Parker Lancers (assistant)
- 2009: San Diego Toreros (assistant)
- 2011: Niagara Purple Eagles (assistant)
- 2012–2013: Dartmouth Big Green (assistant)
- 2018: San Francisco State Gators (assistant)
- 2019–2020: San Francisco State Gators
- 2021–: Wake Forest Demon Deacons (associate head coach)
- * Club domestic league appearances and goals as of September 10, 2015

Brittany Taylor Cameron (born December 3, 1986) is an American soccer goalkeeper who currently employed by Wake Forest as women's soccer associate head soccer coach.

== Early life ==
Cameron grew up in Dublin, California and attended Dublin High School. During her senior year, she was team captain and received Contra Costa Times First Team, First Team All-Diablo Foothill Athletic League, and league Defensive MVP honors. As a junior, she was voted to the First Team All Diablo Foothill Athletic League.

Cameron also played with youth club teams, Dublin High Energy and Pleasanton Rage.

=== University of San Diego ===
Cameron attended and played goalkeeper for the University of San Diego. During her senior year, she earned the West Coast Conference (WCC) Defender of the Year as a senior, becoming the second Torero ever to earn the distinction, while posting nine shutouts and a goals against average of 0.75.

== Club career ==
=== Los Angeles Sol ===
In 2009, Cameron was selected as the 52nd pick overall in the 2009 WPS Draft by the Los Angeles Sol.

=== FC Gold Pride ===
After the Los Angeles Sol ceased operations in 2010, Cameron signed to FC Gold Pride.

=== Western New York Flash ===
In 2011, Cameron signed with the Western New York Flash. The team won the 2011 WPS Championship after a rousing game against the Philadelphia Independence that ended in penalty kicks.

In 2012 after the WPS folded, Cameron signed again with the Western New York Flash this time in the Women's Premier Soccer League. The team went on to become league champions the same year.

=== Sky Blue FC ===
In February 2013, Cameron was selected by Sky Blue FC during the 2013 NWSL Supplemental Draft for the inaugural season of the National Women's Soccer League . After recording a shut-out against her former team, the Western New York Flash during the league's opening weekend, she was named NWSL Player of the Week.

Cameron was nominated for NWSL Goalkeeper of the Year for the 2015 season.

=== Vegalta Sendai Ladies ===
In August 2014, Cameron was loaned to Vegalta Sendai Ladies. Cameron has moved onto Japan for the entire 2015 season with Vegala Sendai. Won MVP Vegalta Sendai ladies 2016.

== Coaching career ==
Cameron served as assistant coach at Niagara University, University of San Diego, Dartmouth College. San Francisco State head coach women's soccer 2019–2020, currently Wake Forest associate head soccer coach – defense and goalkeepers 2020–present.
