= Ashley Nick =

American soccer player (born 1987)

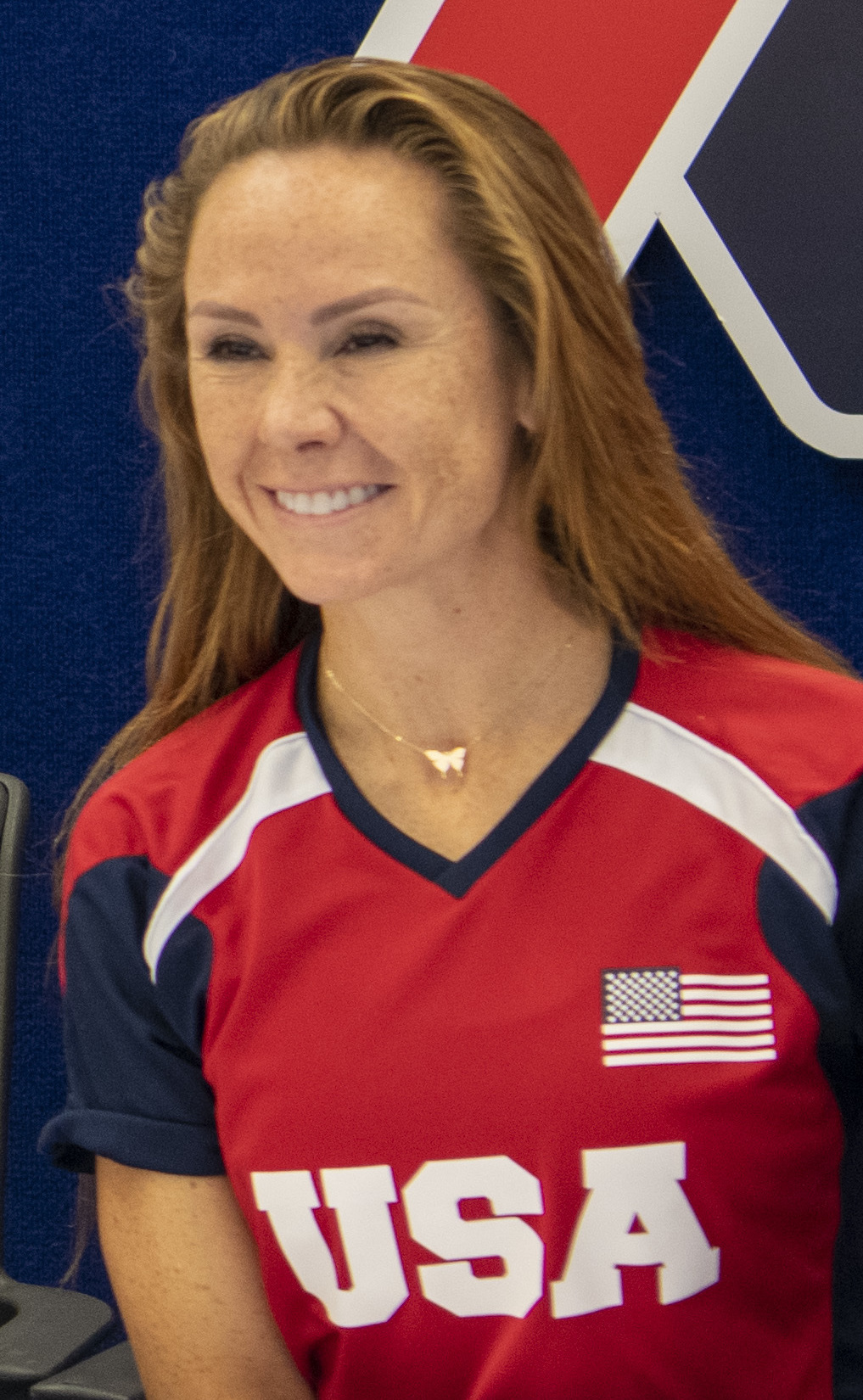
- Nick in 2021

Personal information
- Full name: Ashley Lynn Nick
- Date of birth: October 27, 1987 (age 39)
- Place of birth: Monrovia, California, United States
- Height: 5 ft 8 in (1.73 m)
- Position: Midfielder

Youth career
- 2001–2004: Arcadia High School

College career
Years	Team	Apps	(Gls)
2005–2008	USC Trojans	90	(11)

Senior career*
Years	Team	Apps	(Gls)
2010–2012	FC Twente	37	(3)
2012–2013	Arna-Bjørnar	7	(1)
2013	Pali Blues	15	(8)
2013–2014	Sky Blue FC	25	(1)
2013	→ Zorky Krasnogorsk (loan)	8	(0)
2015	Houston Dash	3	(0)
2015	Western New York Flash	13	(0)
2015–2016	Apollon Limassol	6	(5)
2016	Sky Blue FC	3	(0)
2018–2019	Juventus	7	(0)
2021	Kansas City	0	(0)

International career
2008	United States U23		
- * Club domestic league appearances and goals as of July 8, 2019

Ashley Lynn Nick (born October 27, 1987) is an American former professional soccer player who played as a midfielder.

== College career ==
Nick played college soccer at USC from 2005 to 2008. She scored her first collegiate goal on September 17, 2006 against UNLV. Nick co-captained the USC team that won the 2007 NCAA Women’s Soccer National Championship. Nick was named to the All-Pac-10 First Team in 2007 and 2008.

== Club career ==
She moved to play for FC Twente. There, she won the 2010–11 Eredivisie title. In 2012, she moved to Toppserien side Arna-Bjørnar before moving back in 2013 to the United States by joining Pali Blues and later joined Sky Blue FC. On December 12, 2014, she was traded to the Houston Dash for a draft position in the second and fourth rounds of the 2015 NWSL College Draft. On May 11, 2015, she was traded to the Western New York Flash for defender Toni Pressley.

In the 2015–16 American off-season, Nick scored five goals in six Cypriot First Division games with Apollon Limassol. She re-signed with Sky Blue in March 2016 and announced she would be leaving the club on June 9, 2016.

On September 27, 2018, she joined Italian Serie A club Juventus.

On March 10, 2021, Nick signed a one-year contract with NWSL expansion club Kansas City.

== International career ==
In February 2008, Nick was called up to represent the United States national under-23 team.

== Personal life ==
Her uncles Bruce Matthews and Clay Matthews Jr. both played in the NFL.

== Honors ==
=== Club ===
FC Twente

- Eredivisie
  - Winners: 2010–11
  - Runners-up: 2011–12
- BeNe Super Cup
  - Winners: 2011–12

Juventus

- Serie A
  - Winners: 2018–19
- Coppa Italia
  - Winners: 2018–19
