= Katy Freels =

American soccer player (born 1990)

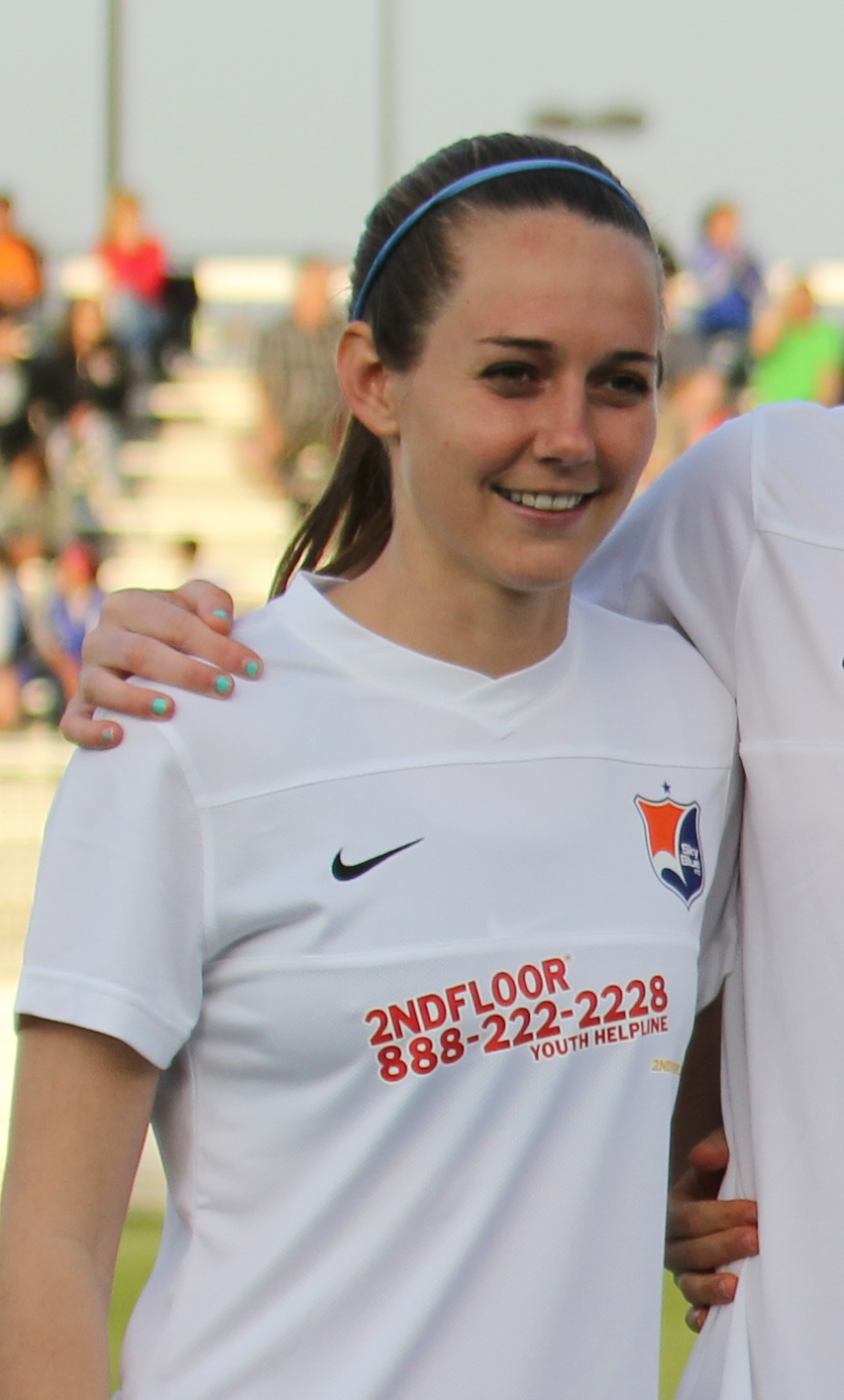
- Freels playing for the Sky Blue in April 2013

Personal information
- Full name: Mary Kathryn Freels
- Birth name: Mary Kathryn Frierson
- Date of birth: April 8, 1990 (age 36)
- Place of birth: Homewood, Alabama
- Height: 5 ft 2 in (1.57 m)
- Position: Midfielder

Youth career
- Birmingham United 90

College career
Years	Team	Apps	(Gls)
2008–2011	Auburn Tigers		

Senior career*
Years	Team	Apps	(Gls)
2012	Western New York Flash		
2013–2015	Sky Blue FC	45	(6)

International career
2007	United States U17		
2008	United States U18		
2008–2010	United States U20		
2008–2013	United States U23		

Managerial career
- 2024–: Florida Tech
- * Club domestic league appearances and goals as of May 20, 2013

Mary Kathryn Freels (née Frierson; born April 8, 1990) is an American former professional soccer midfielder. She played for Sky Blue FC of the NWSL.

== Early life ==
Freels was raised in Homewood, Alabama, where she attended Homewood High School.

=== Auburn University ===
Freels attended Auburn University and played for the Tigers from 2008 to 2010. After her freshman season, she was named South Eastern Conference (SEC) Freshman of the Year, First Team All-SEC, and SEC All-Freshman Team. She received the Tigers' Team Offensive MVP, Rookie of the Year and Coaches Award. She earned Soccer America All-Freshman Team, SoccerBuzz Freshman All-American and All-Region team honors and was named to the TopDrawerSoccer.com All-Rookie Second Team. Freels led Auburn in goals (9) and points (25) and was third in assists (7) and scored four game-winning goals. She started as midfielder in 19 games but also moved up to play a forward during the run of play. Freels was named SEC Freshman of the Week twice and was named Soccer America, Soccer Buzz and TopDrawerSoccer.com Team of the Week choice on Oct 27 after scoring the game-winner at Georgia in the 14th minute of a 1–0 contest and then collecting the first assist on both of Auburn's goals in a 2–1 win over Tennessee.

As a sophomore, she led Auburn and was ninth in the SEC with 20 points. She led the team in assists (10), which was third in the SEC and tied for second on the team with five goals. She was a First Team All-SEC selection for the second straight year.

In 2010, Freels played in and started all 21 matches and led the team and was fourth in the SEC with 28 points (8 goals, 12 assists). Her 12 assists tied for third all-time at Auburn for a single season, one off the school record. She was a Hermann Trophy semi-finalist and earned NSCAA All-America, NSCAA All-South Region First Team, and TopDrawerSoccer.com Team of the Season honors. She was also named First Team All-SEC for the third straight season, making her the third Auburn player to be named First Team three times in a career but the first to be named it in her first three seasons. Freels was named NSCAA Scholar-Athlete of the Year and finished second in the SEC with 12 assists. She was named to the First Team ESPN Academic All-District team and recorded at least one point in all 11 of Auburn's wins. Her 0.57 assists per game led the SEC conference. Freels' first three goals of the season were game winners and she finished the year with four, tying her with the school record with 11 for her career. Her 73 career points ranked fifth at Auburn and she was only the 10th player in school history to crack the 50-point barrier. Her 22 career goals ranked fifth all-time (a four-way tie) while her 29 career assists ranked third all-time at Auburn.

== Playing career ==
=== Club ===
==== Western New York Flash ====
In 2012, Freels was selected tenth overall by the Atlanta Beatin the 2012 WPS Draft; however, the league suspended operations before the 2012 season began. Instead, she played for the Western New York Flash in the Women's Premier Soccer League Elite (WPSL Elite), the top division of women's soccer in the United States at the time, and helped lead the team to the league championship title.

==== Sky Blue FC ====
In 2013, Freels was selected in the first round (fifth overall) of the 2013 NWSL Supplemental Draft by Sky Blue FC in the National Women's Soccer League.

She decided to sit out the 2016 NWSL season.

=== International ===
Freels has played for United States at the U-20 and U-23 levels. She was a member of the U-23 team that won the 2008 Nordic Cup in Falun, Sweden, where she played in three of the four matches and contributed to the squad not surrendering a goal in four matches.

== Coaching career ==
Freels took over as head coach for the Florida Tech Panthers women's soccer team in the Fall 2024 season and led the Panthers to winning the Sunshine State Conference Championship. Freels was named the 2024 SSC Coach of the Year. The Florida Tech women's soccer team would be ranked as high as No. 12. In 2025, Freels led the Panthers to win the NCAA Division II Championships.
