= List of schools in the Roman Catholic Archdiocese of Boston =

This is a list of schools in the Roman Catholic Archdiocese of Boston.

In 2020 the primary and secondary schools of the archdiocese had about 30,000 students and numbered 112.

== Elementary-Age 22 schools ==
- Cardinal Cushing School (Hanover)
- Saint Coletta Day School (Braintree)

== PK-12 schools ==
School	Location	Religious order	Founded
Academy of Notre Dame	Tyngsboro	Sisters of Notre Dame de Namur	1854
Lowell Catholic School	Lowell	Xaverian Brothers	1989

== 5-12 schools ==
School	Location	Religious order	Founded
Newton Country Day School	Newton	Society of the Sacred Heart	1880

== 6-12 schools ==
School	Location	Religious order	Founded
Austin Preparatory School	Reading	Order of Saint Augustine	1961
St. John's Preparatory School	Danvers	Xaverian Brothers	1907
St. Mary's High School	Lynn		1881

== 7-12 schools ==
School	Location	Religious order	Founded
Archbishop Williams High School	Braintree	Sisters of Charity of Nazareth	1949
Boston College High School	Dorchester	Society of Jesus	1863
Cathedral High School	Boston	Sisters of St. Joseph	1926
Catholic Memorial School	West Roxbury	Congregation of Christian Brothers	1957
Notre Dame Academy	Hingham	Sisters of Notre Dame de Namur	1853
Saint Sebastian's School	Needham		1941
Ursuline Academy	Dedham	Ursuline Sisters	1819
Xaverian Brothers High School	Westwood	Xaverian Brothers	1963

== High schools ==
School	Location	Religious order	Founded
Arlington Catholic High School	Arlington	Sisters of St. Joseph	1960
Bishop Fenwick High School	Peabody	Sisters of Notre Dame de Namur	1958
Cardinal Spellman High School	Brockton	Sisters of St. Joseph	1958
Central Catholic High School	Lawrence	Marist Brothers	1935
Cristo Rey Boston High School	Dorchester		2010
Fontbonne Academy	Milton	Sisters of St. Joseph	1954
Malden Catholic High School	Malden	Xaverian Brothers	1968
Notre Dame Cristo Rey High School	Lawrence	Sisters of Notre Dame de Namur	2004

In 2020 Sacred Heart Schools announced that its high school division would close.

== PK-9 schools ==
- Saint Agnes School (Arlington)

== PK-8 schools ==
With former high school divisions:

School	Location	Religious order	Founded
Sacred Heart Schools	Kingston	Congregation of Divine Providence	1947

Other:

- Academy of Notre Dame (Tyngsboro)
- Blessed Sacrament School (Walpole)
- Cheverus Catholic School (Malden)
- East Boston Central Catholic School (East Boston, Boston)
- Holy Name Parish School (West Roxbury)
- Immaculate Conception School (Lowell)
- Immaculate Conception School (Marlborough)
- Immaculate Conception School (Newburyport)
- Immaculate Conception School (Revere)
- Lawrence Catholic Academy (Lawrence)
- Our Lady of the Assumption School (Lynnfield)
- Our Lady's Academy (Waltham)
- Quincy Catholic Academy (Quincy)
- Sacred Heart Elementary School (Weymouth) - It is in Weymouth Landing. Merging in 2020 with St. Francis Xavier in the wake of the COVID-19 pandemic
- Sacred Heart School (Roslindale)
- Sacred Hearts School (Bradford)
- Saint Agatha School (Milton)
- Saint Anthony School (Everett)
- Saint Augustine School (Andover)
- Saint Bridget School (Abington)
- Saint Bridget School (Framingham)
- Saint Catherine of Siena School (Norwood)
- Saint Charles Elementary School (Woburn)
- Saint Columbkille Partnership School (Brighton)
- Saint Francis Xavier School (Weymouth) - It is in the south of the city. Merging in 2020 with Sacred Heart in the wake of the COVID-19 pandemic.
- Saint John School (Boston)
- Saint John the Baptist School (Peabody)
- Saint John the Evangelist School (Canton)
- Saint Joseph Elementary School (Holbrook)
- Saint Joseph School (Medford)
- Saint Joseph School (Wakefield)
- Saint Mary of the Annunciation School (Melrose)
- Saint Mary of the Annunciation School (Danvers)
- Saint Mary of the Assumption Elementary School (Brookline)
- Saint Mary of the Hills School (Milton)
- Saint Michael Elementary School (Lowell)
- Saint Michael School (Andover)
- Saint Monica School (Methuen)
- Saint Patrick School (Stoneham)
- Saint Patrick School (Roxbury)
- Saint Patrick School & Educational Center (Lowell)
- Saint Paul School (Hingham)
- Saint Peter School (Cambridge)
- Saint Pius V Elementary School (Lynn)
- Saint Raphael Parish School (Medford)
- Saint Rose of Lima School (Chelsea)
- Saint Theresa Catholic School (Somerville) - Originally its name was St. Catherine of Genoa School
- St. John Paul II Catholic Academy (Dorchester) - Includes the Columbia, Lower Mills, and Neponset campuses.
- Ste Jeanne d'Arc School (Lowell)
- The Saints Academy (Beverly)
- Trinity Catholic Academy (Brockton) - Includes the Lower Campus and the Upper Campus

== 3-8 schools ==
- Saint Paul's Choir School (Cambridge)

== 4-8 schools ==
- Mother Caroline Academy (Dorchester)
- Nativity Preparatory School (Jamaica Plain)

== 5-8 schools ==
- Bellesini Academy (Lawrence)

== 6-8 schools ==
- Monsignor Haddad Middle School (Needham)

== PK-6 schools ==
- Jackson Walnut Park Schools (Newton), includes Walnut Park Montessori
- Mount Alvernia Academy (Newton)
- Our Lady of Perpetual Help Mission Grammar School (Roxbury)
- Saint Benedict Elementary School (South Natick)
- Saint Brendan School (Dorchester)
- Saint John the Evangelist School (Wellesley Hills)
- Saint Theresa of Avila School (West Roxbury)
- South Boston Catholic Academy (South Boston)

== 1-6 schools ==
- Sacred Heart Elementary School (Kingston)

== PK-5 schools ==
- Sacred Heart School (Lynn) (formerly until grade 8)
- Saint Joseph Elementary School (Needham)
- Saint Mary's School (Winchester)

== Preschool and Kindergarten ==
- Good Shepherd Early Childhood (Charlestown)
- Sacred Heart Early Childhood Center (Kingston)

== Former schools ==
=== Former 6-12 schools ===
School	Location	Religious order	Opened	Closed
Saint Clement School	Medford	Sisters of St. Joseph	1925	2017

=== Former high schools ===
School	Location	Religious order	Opened	Closed
Academy of the Assumption	Wellesley		1893	1972
Blessed Sacrament High School	Jamaica Plain	Redemptorists		2004
Boys' Catholic High School	Malden	Xaverian Brothers	1936	1968
Cambridge Matignon School	Cambridge		1945	2023
Cardinal Cushing High School	South Boston			
Cheverus High School	Malden	Sisters of Providence of Saint Mary-of-the-Woods	1908	1971
Christopher Columbus High School	Boston	Franciscan Friars	1945	1990
Don Bosco Technical High School	Boston	Salesians of Don Bosco	1946	1998
Elizabeth Seton Academy	Boston			2003
Girls' Catholic High School	Malden			1992
Holy Trinity High School	Roxbury			1966
Hudson Catholic High School	Hudson		1959	2009
Keith Academy	Lowell	Xaverian Brothers	1926	1989
Keith Hall	Lowell	Sisters of St. Joseph	1926	1989
Marian High School	Framingham	Sisters of St. Joseph	1956	2018
Mission Church High School	Mission Hill		1926	1992
Monsignor Ryan High School	South Boston			2002
Mount Saint Joseph Academy	Boston	Sisters of St. Joseph	1884	2012
Mount Alvernia High School	Newton		1935	2023
Nazareth High School	South Boston			
North Cambridge Catholic High School	Cambridge		1951	2010
Notre Dame Academy	Roxbury	Sisters of Notre Dame de Namur	1854	1954
Pope John XXIII High School	Everett		1965	2019
Presentation of Mary Academy	Methuen	Sisters of the Presentation of Mary	1958	2020
Our Lady of Nazareth Academy	Wakefield	Sisters of Charity of Nazareth	1947	2009
Sacred Heart High School	East Boston	Sisters of Notre Dame	1881	~1970
St. Anne's School	Arlington		1928	1980
St. Augustine High School	South Boston	Sisters of Notre Dame de Namur	1895	
St. Bernard High School	Newton			
St. Clare High School	Roslindale			2002
St. Columbkille High School	Brighton		1901	2006
St. John the Evangelist High School	Cambridge		1921	1951
Saint Joseph Preparatory High School	Brighton		2012	2023
St. Joseph's High School for Boys	Lowell	Marist Brothers	1892	1989
St. Joseph's School	Roxbury		1854	2003
St. Louis Academy	Lowell	Sisters of the Assumption	1918	1989
St. Patrick High School	Lowell	Sisters of Notre Dame	1831	1989
St. Patrick High School	Roxbury		1887	2020
St. Thomas Aquinas High School	Jamaica Plain		1927	1975
Savio Preparatory High School	East Boston	Salesians of Don Bosco	1958	2007
Trinity Catholic High School	Newton		1894	2012

=== PK-8 schools (former) ===
- Charlestown Catholic Elementary School (Charlestown) - The final remaining Catholic school in the neighborhood, it closed in 2003.
- Franco American School (Lowell) (private) - It was established on the Ayer Estate as an orphanage for French American children after the Missionary Oblates of Mary Immaculate purchased the property in September 1908. Various extra facilities were added to the property. It was originally a boarding school only but hosted non-boarding children by the 1950s and then ended boarding in 1978. It closed in 2016. Coalition for a Better Acre and TMI Property Management & Development together purchased the facility for $2.3 million in 2017. The building remained intact with about 20,000 square feet (1,900 m^{2}) for office purposes and the other space for apartments, with five constructed on a roof and the remaining 48 in the existing space.
- Saint Francis of Assisi School (Braintree) - Opened circa 1960 and closed by the archdiocese in 2020 in the wake of the COVID-19 pandemic. A petition to the archdiocese to keep the school open gained over 2,000 signatures, but the decision was maintained.
- St. Catherine of Siena School (Charlestown) - Opened in 1911
- Saint Jerome Elementary School (Weymouth) - Opened in 1959 and was closed in 2020 by the archdiocese due to low enrollment in the wake of the COVID-19 pandemic.
- St. Joseph Elementary School (Roxbury) - Closed in 2003.
- Saint Louis School (Lowell) - Closed in 2020 in the wake of the COVID-19 pandemic.
- St. Thomas Aquinas Grammar School (Jamaica Plain) was open from 1873 to 1973.
