= 2013 Boston Breakers season =

Boston Breakers
2013 season
- Owner: Boston Women's Soccer, LLC
- Head coach: (United States) Lisa Cole (until Aug. 2) (United States) Cat Whitehill (Aug. 2–Sept. 3) (United States) Tom Durkin (from Sept. 3)
- Stadium: Dilboy Stadium; Somerville, Massachusetts
- NWSL: 5th
- NWSL Playoffs: DNQ
- Top goalscorer: Sydney Leroux (11)
- Highest home attendance: 3,113 vs. Chicago (May 4, 2013)
- Lowest home attendance: 1,246 vs. Washington (May 15, 2013)
- Average home league attendance: 2,428
- Biggest win: 3 goals (3 times)
- Biggest defeat: NJ 5–1 BOS (June 1)
Home colors	Away colors

The 2013 Boston Breakers season, is the club's eighth overall year of existence, fourth consecutive year, and first year as a member of the National Women's Soccer League.

== Background ==
The foundation of the league was announced on November 21, 2012, with Boston selected as a host for one of the eight teams.

Lisa Cole was announced as the head coach on December 7, 2012, returning after leading the Breakers during a successful run in the Women's Premier Soccer League Elite the previous year.

== Club ==
=== Executive staff ===
Ownership Group	Boston Women's Soccer, LLC
Managing Partner	Michael Stoller
General Manager	Lee Billiard
Ground (capacity and dimensions)	Dilboy Stadium (3,500 / 110x70 yards)

Updated to match played March 7, 2013

=== Coaching staff ===
On August 2, 2013, the Breakers fired head coach Lisa Cole and appointed defender Cat Whitehill as interim head coach. On Sept. 3, 2013, the Breakers hired Tom Durkin as the team's new head coach.

Position	Staff
Head Coach	Lisa Cole (until Aug. 2)
Interim Head Coach	Cat Whitehill (after Aug. 2)
Assistant Coach	Maren Rojas
Assistant Coach	Kristine Lilly
Assistant Coach	Chris Gores
Assistant Coach	Darren Marshall
Goalkeeper Coach	Jason Hamilton
Technical Advisor	Marcia McDermott

Last updated: July 19, 2013
Source: Coaching Staff

=== Roster ===
Note: Flags indicate national team as defined under FIFA eligibility rules; some limited exceptions apply. Players may hold more than one non-FIFA nationality.

No.	Pos.	Nation	Player
2	FW	USA	Sydney Leroux
3	FW	USA	Kate Howarth
4	DF	USA	Cat Whitehill
5	MF	NOR	Lisa-Marie Woods
7	DF	CAN	Rhian Wilkinson
8	DF	USA	Julie King
9	MF	USA	Heather O'Reilly
10	FW	ENG	Lianne Sanderson
11	MF	USA	Joanna Lohman

No.	Pos.	Nation	Player
12	FW	USA	Katie Schoepfer
14	DF	USA	Kia McNeill
17	FW	AUS	Kyah Simon
19	FW	CAN	Adriana Leon
20	MF	USA	Mariah Nogueira
22	GK	MEX	Cecilia Santiago
24	GK	USA	Ashley Phillips
25	FW	USA	Jo Dragotta

== Competitions ==
=== Key ===
Win Tie Loss

=== Regular season ===
==== April ====
April 14, 2013 1	Boston Breakers	1–1	Washington Spirit	Somerville, Massachusetts
18:30 (EST)	Leroux 90+1'	Report	McCarty 15'; Wells (yellow card) 74'	Stadium: Dilboy Stadium; Attendance: 2,634

April 20, 2013 2	FC Kansas City	Postponed	Boston Breakers	Overland Park, Kansas
19:35				Stadium: Shawnee Mission District Stadium

April 27, 2013 3	Western New York Flash	1–2	Boston Breakers	Rochester, New York
19:35 (EST)	Kerr 7' (Heyboer)	Report	O'Reilly 16' (Leroux), 83' (Sanderson)	Stadium: Sahlen's Stadium; Attendance: 4,065; Referee: Eugene Mednikov

==== May ====
May 4, 2013 4	Boston Breakers	4–1	Chicago Red Stars	Somerville, Massachusetts
18:00 (EST)	Schoepfer 20' (Sanderson); Leroux 26' (O'Reilly), 74', 84' (Simon)	Report	Bywaters 60' (Chalupny)	Stadium: Dilboy Stadium; Attendance: 3,113; Referee: Kristen Schiereck
Note: Leroux's hat-trick was the first in league history. The 3,113 attendance was a sell-out and the largest in Dilboy Stadium history.

May 11, 2013 5	Washington Spirit	1–1	Boston Breakers	Germantown, Maryland
19:00 EST	Lindsey 51' (Matheson)	Report	Lohman 24' (Sanderson)	Stadium: Maryland SoccerPlex; Attendance: 4,027; Referee: Josh Wilkens

May 18, 2013 6	FC Kansas City	2–0	Boston Breakers	Overland Park, Kansas
19:35 EST	Cuéllar 17' (Cheney); Cheney 64' (Loyd)	Report; Report		Stadium: Shawnee Mission District Stadium; Attendance: 4,362; Referee: Miguel Panduro Jr.

May 25, 2013 7	Boston Breakers	3–0	Washington Spirit	Somerville, Massachusetts
19:00 (EST)	O'Reilly 38' (Sanderson); Schoepfer 53' (Sanderson); Simon 66' (Sanderson)	Report		Stadium: Dilboy Stadium; Attendance: 1,246

==== June ====
June 1, 2013 8	Sky Blue FC	5–1	Boston Breakers	Piscataway, New Jersey
19:00 (EST)	Adams 7' (De Vanna), 85' (pen.); De Vanna 14' (Freels), 56'; Lytle 17' (Freels)	Report	Leon 75'	Stadium: Yurcak Field; Attendance: 1,312; Referee: Robert Sibiga

June 5, 2013 9	Boston Breakers	2–2	Western New York Flash	Somerville, Massachusetts
19:00 (EST)	Sanderson 44'; Leroux 64'	Report	Wambach 28'; Jodi-Ann Robinson 90+4'	Stadium: Dilboy Stadium; Attendance: 2,124; Referee: John McCloskey; Boris Senic
Note: Center referee John McCloskey suffered an ankle injury in the 10th minute and was replaced by fourth official Boris Senic.

June 9, 2013 10	Chicago Red Stars	1–0	Boston Breakers	Lisle, Illinois
15:00 (EST)	Chalupny 26' (Sitch) (yellow card) 75'; Wenino (yellow card) 29'	Box; Report		Stadium: Benedictine University Sports Complex Stadium; Attendance: 1,129; Referee: Kari Seitz

June 16, 2013	Boston Breakers	2–3	Sky Blue FC	Somerville, Massachusetts
18:30 (EST)	Lohman 61' (King); Dragotta (yellow card) 69'; Simon 90+5' (Schoepfer)	Report	De Vanna 9' (Ocampo); Ocampo 26'; Freels 71' (Adams)	Stadium: Dilboy Stadium; Attendance: 2,687; Referee: Christina Unkel

June 26, 2013 12	Boston Breakers	1–2	Seattle Reign FC	Somerville, Massachusetts
19:00 (PST)	Nogueira 51'; O'Reilly (yellow card)	Box; Report	Fishlock 78'; Nairn 86'	Stadium: Dilboy Stadium; Attendance: 2,012; Referee: John McCloskey

June 30, 2013 13	Boston Breakers	3–2	Sky Blue FC	Somerville, Massachusetts
18:30 (EST)	Leroux 29', 41'; Nogueira 35' (O'Reilly)	Box; Report	Schmidt 31' (Ocampo) (red card) 90+2'; Ocampo 58'	Stadium: Dilboy Stadium; Attendance: 1,876; Referee: Katja Koroleva

==== July ====
July 3, 2013	Seattle Reign FC	1–1	Boston Breakers	Tukwila, Washington
19:00 (EST)	Kyle (yellow card) 25'; Fishlock (yellow card) 37'; McDonald 54' (Nairn)	Report	Leroux 63' (O'Reilly)	Stadium: Starfire Stadium; Attendance: 1,430; Referee: Miguel Panduro

July 6, 2013	Portland Thorns FC	0–2	Boston Breakers	Portland, Oregon
19:30 (EST)	Sinclair (yellow card) 35'; Foxhoven (yellow card) 74'	Report	Leroux 11' (O'Reilly), 39' (O'Reilly); McNeill (yellow card) 13'	Stadium: Jeld-Wen Field; Attendance: 12,436; Referee: Robert Sibiga

July 13, 2013	Sky Blue FC	0–0	Boston Breakers	Piscataway, New Jersey
19:00 (EST)		Report		Stadium: Yurcak Field; Attendance: 1,279; Referee: Margaret Domka

July 21, 2013	Boston Breakers	1–2	Portland Thorns FC	Somerville, Massachusetts
16:00 (EST)	Sanderson 13' (Simon)	Report	Morgan 23' (Marshall); Shim 86' (Morgan)	Stadium: Dilboy Stadium; Attendance: 2,978; Referee: Robert Sibiga

July 24, 2013	FC Kansas City	3–0	Boston Breakers	Overland Park, Kansas
19:35 (EST)	McNeill 72' (Mathias); Jones 85' (Holiday); Mathias 90' (Holiday)	Report		Stadium: Shawnee Mission District Stadium; Attendance: 5,024; Referee: Margaret Domka

July 27, 2013	Washington Spirit	2–5	Boston Breakers	Germantown, Maryland
19:00 (EST)	Matheson 2' (Spencer); Pohlers 73' (Ochs)	Report	Nogueira 5' (O'Reilly); Sanderson 48' (Wilkinson); Wilkinson 48'; O'Reilly 57' (pen.); Whitehill 78'	Stadium: Maryland SoccerPlex; Attendance: 2,607; Referee: Kara Honthumb

==== August ====
August 3, 2013	Boston Breakers	2–2	Western New York Flash	Somerville, Massachusetts
14:00 (EST)	Simon 17' (Whitehill); Lohman (yellow card) 36'; Sanderson 65'	Box; Report	Lloyd (yellow card) 28' (goal) 85'; Wambach (yellow card) 74'; DiMartino 77'	Stadium: Dilboy Stadium; Attendance: 2,899; Referee: Christina Unkel
Note: Cat Whitehill's first match as player-manager.

August 7, 2013	Boston Breakers	2–1	Portland Thorns FC	Somerville, Massachusetts
19:00 (EST)	Sanderson 68'; O'Reilly 84'	Box; Report	Weimer 52'	Stadium: Dilboy Stadium; Attendance: 3,012; Referee: Elvis Mahmutovic

August 10, 2013	Boston Breakers	1–0	FC Kansas City	Somerville, Massachusetts
16:35 (EST)	Leroux 65'	Box; Report		Stadium: Dilboy Stadium; Attendance: 2,116; Referee: Kara Honthumb

August 17, 2013	Western New York Flash	2–1	Boston Breakers	Rochester, New York
19:35 (EST)	Kerr 23' (Wambach); Wambach 27' (Taylor)	Box; Report	Wilkinson 54' (yellow card) 70'	Stadium: Sahlen's Stadium; Attendance: 6,311; Referee: Dimitar Chavdarov

== Standings ==
Pos	Team	Pld	W	D	L	GF	GA	GD	Pts	Qualification
1	Western New York Flash	22	10	8	4	36	20	+16	38	NWSL Shield
2	FC Kansas City	22	11	5	6	34	22	+12	38	NWSL Playoffs
3	Portland Thorns FC (C)	22	11	5	6	32	25	+7	38	NWSL Playoffs
4	Sky Blue FC	22	10	6	6	31	26	+5	36	NWSL Playoffs
5	Boston Breakers	22	8	6	8	35	34	+1	30	
6	Chicago Red Stars	22	8	6	8	32	36	−4	30	
7	Seattle Reign FC	22	5	3	14	22	36	−14	18	
8	Washington Spirit	22	3	5	14	16	39	−23	14	

Source: soccerway.com
Rules for classification: Tiebreakers
(C) Champions

=== Results summary ===
Overall								Home						Away					
Pld	Pts	W	L	T	GF	GA	GD	W	L	T	GF	GA	GD	W	L	T	GF	GA	GD
22	30	8	8	6	35	34	+1	5	3	3	22	16	+6	3	5	3	13	18	−5

Last updated: August 17, 2013
Pld = Matches played; Pts = Points; W = Matches won; T = Matches tied; L = Matches lost; GF = Goals for; GA = Goals against; GD = Goal difference

=== Results by round ===
Round	1	2	3	4	5	6	7	8	9	10	11	12	13	14	15	16	17	18	19	20	21	22	23
Stadium	H	A	A	H	A	A	H	A	H	A	H	H	H	A	A	A	H	A	A	H	H	A	A
Result	D	P	W	W	D	L	W	L	D	L	L	L	W	D	W	D	L	L	W	D	W	W	L

Source: FBref
A = Away; H = Home; W = Win; D = Draw; L = Loss; P = Postponed
Notes: match 18 was a rescheduled match 2

== Squad statistics ==
Key to positions: FW – Forward, MF – Midfielder, DF – Defender, GK – Goalkeeper

Note: jersey numbers were reassigned during the season, when a player left and another joined

N	Nat	Pos	Name	GP	GS	Min	G	A	WG	Shot	SOG	Cro	CK	Off	Foul	FS	YC	RC
5	(United States)	DF	Jazmyne Avant	11	11	990	0	1	0	1	0	3	0	0	6	12	0	0
25	(United States)	MF	Jo Dragotta	10	6	565	0	0	0	0	0	3	0	0	6	1	1	0
18	(United States)	MF	Maddy Evans	11	2	370	0	0	0	3	0	2	0	0	3	4	0	0
23	(United States)	FW	Elizabeth Guess	1	0	15	0	1	0	0	0	0	0	0	0	0	0	0
3	(United States)	FW	Kate Howarth	4	0	26	0	0	0	0	0	0	0	0	0	0	0	0
8	(United States)	DF	Julie King	21	21	1862	0	1	0	5	3	3	0	3	10	7	0	0
19	(Canada)	FW	Adriana Leon	6	1	163	1	0	0	3	1	0	0	0	3	2	0	0
2	(United States)	FW	Sydney Leroux	19	19	1694	11	2	4	62	30	13	0	15	11	9	1	0
11	(United States)	MF	Joanna Lohman	22	21	1897	2	0	0	12	6	2	1	2	14	15	2	0
14	(United States)	DF	Kia McNeill	21	21	1890	0	0	0	4	0	0	0	0	7	3	2	0
23	(United States)	DF	Melinda Mercado	1	1	90	0	0	0	0	0	0	0	0	2	0	0	0
19	(Canada)	DF	Carmelina Moscato	5	1	76	0	0	0	0	0	0	0	0	1	1	0	0
20	(United States)	MF	Mariah Nogueira	20	16	1408	3	1	0	11	7	2	0	2	14	18	1	0
9	(United States)	MF	Heather O'Reilly	20	20	1734	5	6	3	43	32	35	54	15	11	6	1	0
10	(England)	FW	Lianne Sanderson	22	21	1913	5	7	0	41	15	11	12	1	16	33	0	0
23	(United States)	FW	Katie Schoepfer	20	14	1080	2	1	0	31	13	9	36	9	7	2	0	0
17	(Australia)	FW	Kyah Simon	17	11	1068	3	3	0	41	22	6	1	9	9	8	0	0
4	(United States)	DF	Cat Whitehill	22	22	1978	1	2	0	20	8	15	0	0	7	6	1	0
7	(Canada)	DF	Rhian Wilkinson	14	11	913	2	1	1	7	3	9	0	1	6	9	1	0
5	(Norway)	MF	Lisa-Marie Woods	4	1	68	0	0	0	3	1	0	0	0	1	1	0	0

N	Nat	Pos	Name	GP	GS	Min	W	L	T	Shot	SOG	Sav	GA	GA/G	Pen	PKF	SO
1	(United States)	GK	Alyssa Naeher	9	8	765	4	2	2	112	47	36	11	1.222	0	1	2
24	(United States)	GK	Ashley Phillips	11	11	945	2	5	4	117	51	32	20	1.818	1	1	1
22	(Mexico)	GK	Cecilia Santiago	3	3	270	2	1	0	32	14	11	3	1	0	0	1

== See also ==
- 2013 National Women's Soccer League season
- 2013 in American soccer
