= St. Catherine of Siena School =

St. Catherine of Siena School may refer to:

- St. Catherine of Siena School (Martinez, California)
- St. Catherine of Siena School (Norwood, Massachusetts)
