= Dilboy Stadium =

Sports stadium in the United States

George Dilboy Memorial Stadium
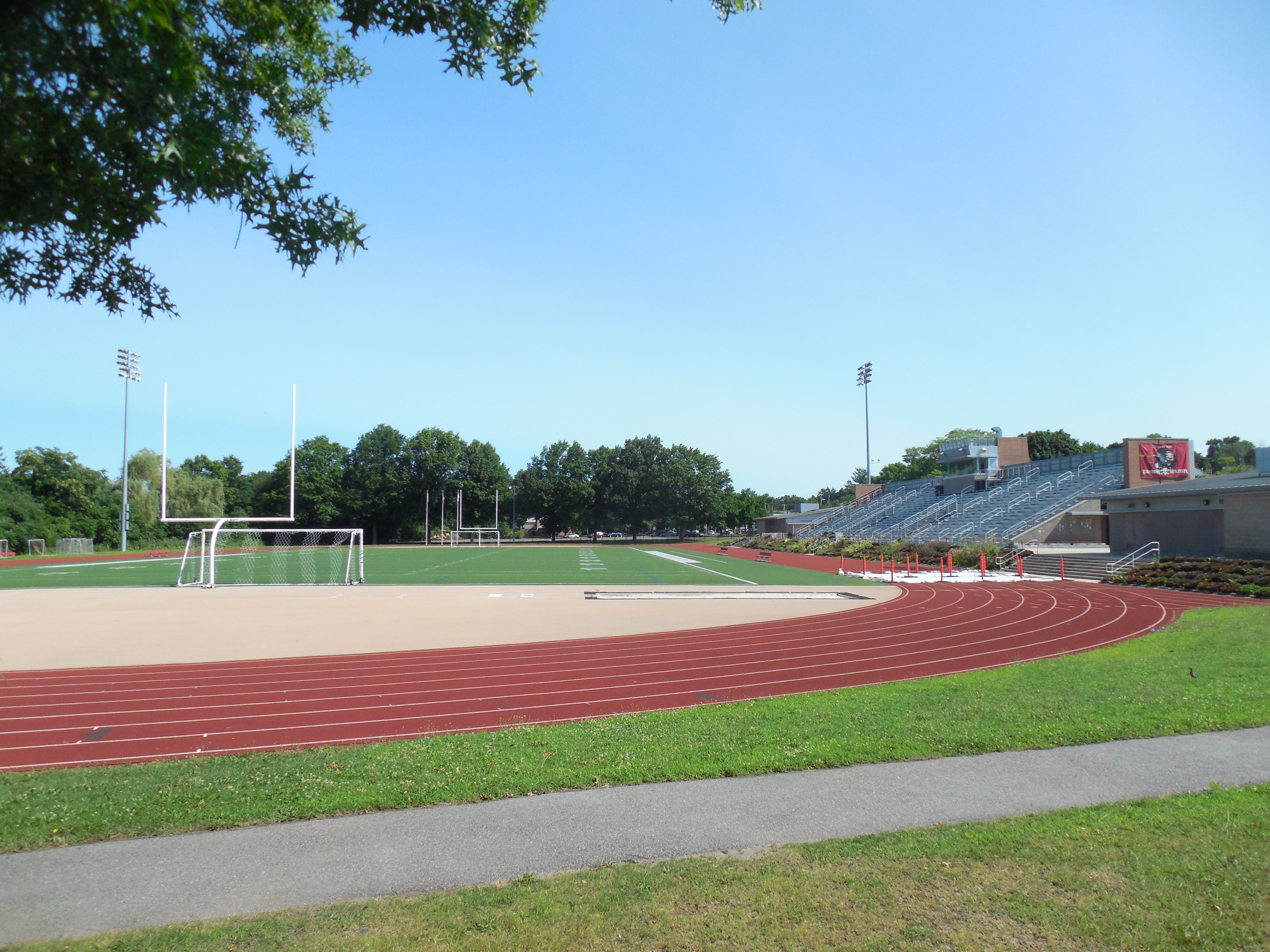
- Interactive map of George Dilboy Memorial Stadium
- Location: 110 Alewife Brook Parkway, Somerville, Massachusetts
- Coordinates: 42°24′43.45″N 71°07′54.70″W
- Owner: Massachusetts Department of Conservation and Recreation
- Operator: Somerville Department of Public Works
- Surface: synthetic turf
- Public transit: MBTA bus: 80, 87, 88, 89, 90

Construction
- Groundbreaking: 1952 (original stadium); 2006 (second stadium)
- Opened: 1955 (original stadium); 2006 (second stadium)
- Cost: US$ 7.7 million (second stadium)
- Architect: Bargmann Hendrie + Archetype Inc. (second stadium)

Tenants
- Boston Breakers (2012–2013); Boston Militia (2008–2014); Boston Renegades (2015-2017); Somerville Rampage (2015-) local high schools

Website
- www.somervillerec.com/info/facilities/details.aspx?FacilityID=13602

George Dilboy Memorial Stadium is a multi-purpose public sports stadium in the city of Somerville, Massachusetts. It is the home of the Somerville Rampage semi-pro men's football team, the Boston Renegades semi-pro women's football team, as well as teams from Somerville High School, Saint Clement High School, and Matignon High School.

The stadium is named for George Dilboy, who lived in Somerville and was awarded the Medal of Honor during World War I. The original stadium opened in 1955. It was demolished and rebuilt in 2006. When it opened, the current stadium seated 2,000. Since then, it has been expanded at various times to accommodate the teams playing there. Located just off of Massachusetts Route 2, it is also under two miles from Davis Station and Alewife Station, making it reachable by a variety of forms of transit.

It is located close to Alewife Brook Reservation (a Massachusetts state park), as well as a Somerville city park with a swimming pool, two baseball fields, tennis courts, basketball courts, and a playground.

== 1955 Stadium ==
The first Dilboy Stadium was opened in 1955. The inaugural game was a football match between Somerville High School and Medford High School on October 8, 1955. When the stadium opened, its capacity was 5,000.

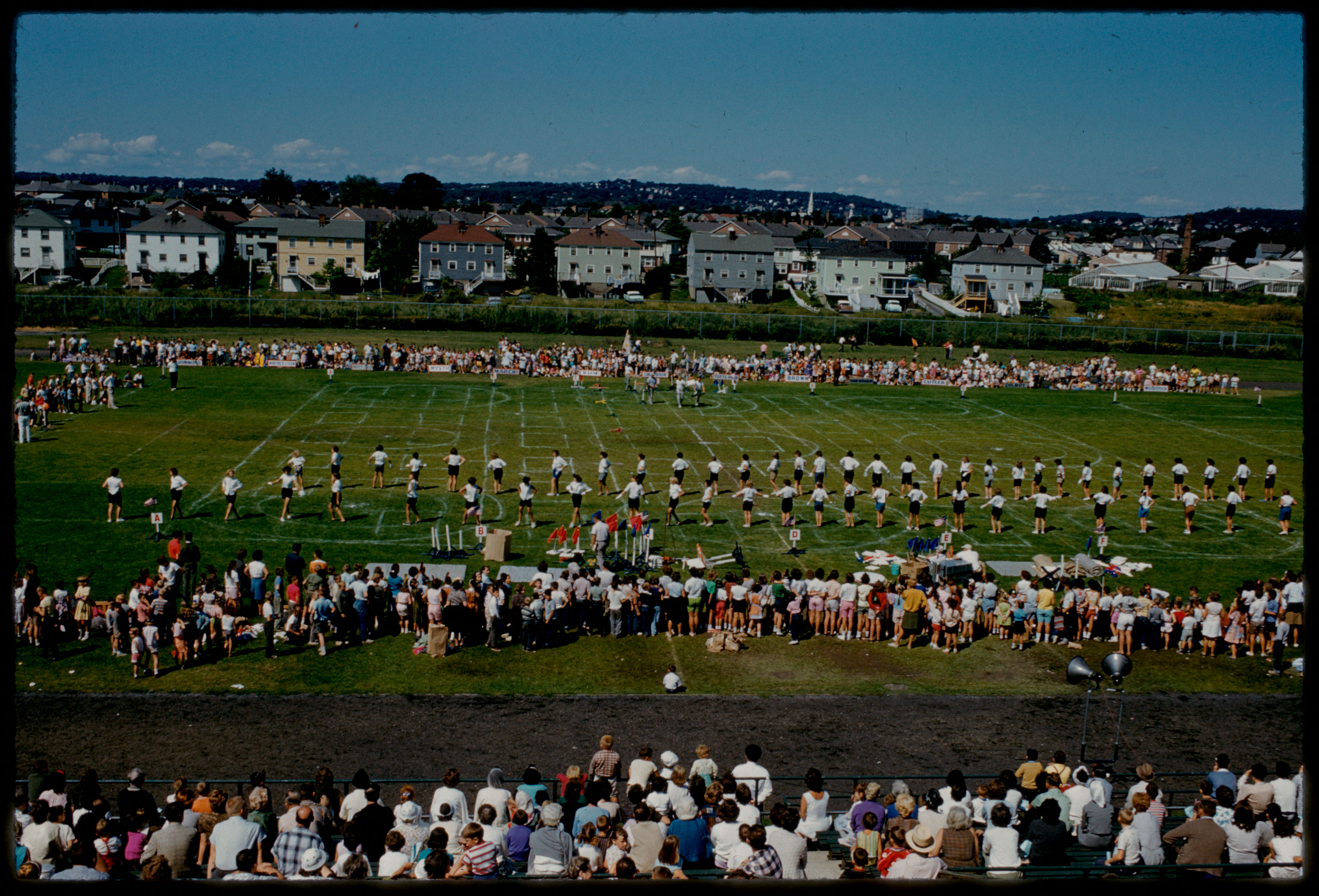
Events at the original Stadium in 1962

Plans for the stadium began about twenty years earlier but were delayed many times, including by World War II and a 1950 federal ban on construction of recreational facilities. Several fundraising drives failed. In 1952, John F. Kennedy, then a congressman from Massachusetts, helped allocated steel from the National Production Authority for the stadium. The stadium was eventually built as a partnership between the City of Somerville and the Metropolitan District Commission, both of which contributed over $20,000 to the effort. Since the stadium was not wholly Somerville's, the high schools playing in it were charged rent and other fees.

Before Dilboy Stadium was built, the Somerville High School football team had not played a home game since 1942. This decreased the football program's income, as the custom was to split gate receipts, giving 60% to the home team and 40% to the away team. This contributed to pressure to build a stadium.

== 2006 Stadium ==
By the early 2000s, the stadium had fallen into disrepair. State Senator Charlie Shannon lobbied the state government intensively for the $8 million necessary to demolish and replace the stadium. The funding was part of the state budget approved by Governor Mitt Romney in September 2004. Shannon died before the project's completion, and there were plans to name the replacement stadium after Shannon instead of Dilboy. The renaming was scratched after Somerville's Greek community spoke out in favor of retaining the name Dilboy. The replacement Dilboy Stadium opened in September 2006.

Dilboy Stadium was a blighted state-owned facility before a $7.7 million renovation, funded by the Commonwealth of Massachusetts, turned it into a gleaming venue for soccer, football, and running. The central playing surface is a 100-yard synthetic turf football and soccer field, surrounded by a standard 400-meter eight-lane running track. The stadium's lighting system has a range of illumination levels suitable for various activities, from evening football games to walking and jogging on the track. The low-maintenance feature of synthetic turf reduces down-time, which, along with the artificial lighting, maximizes programming in the stadium.

The facility is operated and staffed by the City of Somerville, which is responsible for its security, scheduling and maintenance.

The stadium is designed to allow different buildings on its site to be open or closed, depending on how it is used. It is open to local residents who can run or walk on the track. It is also a home stadium for high school teams of the city.

The stadium was designed by Bargmann Hendrie + Archetype Inc. of Boston. Its size is over 17,000 square feet and it seats 2,000 in a 10,000-square-foot grandstand. The team room building is 2,100 square feet, and the concession building in 2,600 square feet, including storage and a garage.

The stadium was home to the Boston Militia of the Women's Football Alliance (WFA) league from 2008 to 2014 and to the women's soccer club, the Boston Breakers, in 2012 and 2013. It is the current home of the Somerville Rampage of the New England Football League and to the Boston Renegades of the WFA.

As of 2014, the stadium was averaging 601 uses per year.

== Use ==
As of 2026, the stadium is still active. Hours: 8am - 11pm and the facilities are available for Football, Soccer and Track Permits (as well as lights & locker rooms) are available for football, soccer and track events. There is a permit fee of $200 per hour which does not include use of scoreboard, locker rooms, or concession. Many teams use Dilboy Stadium, so check their schedules to see upcoming games with the Somerville High varsity football and soccer. The following teams have held home games at the stadium.

Team	Sport	League (during most recent year at Dilboy)	Years
Boston Breakers	soccer	National Women's Soccer League	2012, 2013
Boston Militia	football	Women's Football Alliance	2008–2014
Boston Renegades	football	Women's Football Alliance	2015–
Somerville Rampage	football	New England Football League	2015-
Somerville High School	soccer	Greater Boston League	
Somerville High School	football	Greater Boston League	
Saint Clement High School	soccer	Catholic Central League	
Saint Clement High School	football	Catholic Central League	
Matignon High School	football	Catholic Central League	
