= Catholic Central League =

High school athletic conference in Massachusetts

The Catholic Central League (CCL) is a high school athletic conference in District 6 of the Massachusetts Interscholastic Athletic Association. Most league members are schools with Catholic affiliations. The league is based mostly in the eastern part of Massachusetts.

== Member Schools ==
The Catholic Central League is composed of 8 member schools. The schools are split into two divisions, Large and Small. The Large encompasses the 6 larger enrollment schools, and the Small the 7 smaller enrollment schools. Marian High School, formerly a member of the Small, exited the CCL in 2018 upon its permanent closure. Bishop Feehan and Bishop Stang were added to the CCL after multiple schools in the Eastern Athletic Conference (EAC) either closed down or changed conference affiliation.

Austin Prep announced that they would be departing the Catholic Central League and the Massachusetts Interscholastic Athletic Association to join the New England Preparatory School Athletic Council following the conclusion of the 2021–22 academic year.

== Current members ==
School Name	Team Name	Colors	Founded	Location
Archbishop Williams High School	Bishops		1949	Braintree
Arlington Catholic High School	Cougars		1960	Arlington
Bishop Fenwick High School	Crusaders		1958	Peabody
Bishop Stang High School	Spartans		1959	North Dartmouth
Cardinal Spellman High School	Cardinals		1958	Brockton
Cathedral High School	Panthers		1926	Boston
Cristo Rey Boston High School	Knights		1921	Dorchester
St. Mary's High School	Spartans		1881	Lynn

== Former Members ==
- Austin Preparatory School
- Bishop Feehan High School
- Lowell Catholic High School
- Marian High School
- The Cambridge Matignon School
- Monsignor Ryan Memorial High School
- Pope John XXIII High School
- Saint Clement High School
- Saint Joseph Preparatory High School
- St. Dominic Savio Preparatory High School
- Trinity Catholic High School

== Sports ==
- Baseball
- Basketball
- Field Hockey
- Football
- Golf
- Gymnastics
- Ice Hockey
- Lacrosse
- Ski
- Soccer
- Softball
- Swimming & Diving
- Tennis
- Track & Cross Country
- Volleyball

== State Champions ==
Archbishop Williams - Girls Basketball 1996, 2013, 2015, 2017, 2018. -Boys Baseball 1992, 1995, 2018 - Boys Basketball 2023

Arlington Catholic - Football (1993, 2008), Girls Basketball (2011, 2014), Boys Basketball (1996), Boys Ice Hockey (1978, 1990, 1997), Girls Ice Hockey (2007, 2012).

Austin Prep - 2009 Football, 2016 Girls Hockey, 2020 Girls Hockey, 2018 Baseball, 2020 Indoor Track.

Bishop Feehan - Boys Cross Country Team All-State Champions - 1987, 1993, 1994, 2003, 2008, 2011 Girls Cross Country Team All-State Champions - 2003, 2009, 2010, 2011, 2012

Bishop Fenwick - Boys- Baseball (2004), Football (1965, 1999, 2000, 2013), Hockey, and Indoor and Outdoor track in boys' sports. Girls- Softball (1990, 1991, 1992, 1993, 1994, 1995, 1996, 1997), Field Hockey, Cross-Country track (1980), Girls Basketball (2016) and indoor and outdoor track.

Cardinal Spellman - 2014 Boys Basketball, 2009 Girls Soccer, 2003 Softball, 2001 Softball, 1993 Football, 1993 Boys Golf, 1990 Boys Golf, 1984 Boys Basketball.

Cathedral - Boys Basketball 2006, 2007, 2009. Football 2012. Girls Basketball 2016, 2017.

Cristo Rey Boston - Boys Basketball 2008. (As North Cambridge Catholic High School)

Lowell Catholic - Boys Baseball 2013. Boys Ice Hockey 2017

Marian - Football 1992, 2001, 2002. Girls Soccer 1999. Girls Basketball 1996, 2006. Baseball 2003.

Matignon - Boys Ice Hockey 1975, 1977, 1980, 1981, 1982, 1983, 1984, 1987, 1988, 1993

Pope John XXIII - Football 1998.

Saint Clement - Football 1984. Boys Basketball 2014.

St. Joseph Prep - Boys Baseball 2021.

St. Mary's - Baseball 1987, 1988, 2015. Boys Basketball 2000, 2001, 2002, 2012, 2016. Girls Basketball 2001, 2002, 2011, 2014. Football 2005. Boys Golf 2005, 2006, 2017. Girls Ice Hockey 2005, 2008, 2009, and 2010. Boys Soccer 1988. Softball 2008. Boys Ice Hockey 2017. Boys Basketball 2026.

== Conference Championships ==
- Cross Country: Bishop Feehan 3x champions (2020, 2021, 2022)
