= Cigna (disambiguation) =

The Cigna Group is an American healthcare and insurance company.

Cigna may also refer to:

== People ==
- Gina Cigna (1900–2001), French-Italian dramatic soprano
- John Cigna (1935–2011), American radio personality

== See also ==
- Signa Holding, an Austrian real estate, retail and media conglomerate
