= Fred Willis =

American football player (1947-2023)

No. 33, 21, 44
- Position: Running back

Personal information
- Born: December 9, 1947; Natick, Massachusetts, U.S.
- Died: July 4, 2023 (aged 75); Natick, Massachusetts, U.S.
- Listed height: 6 ft 0 in (1.83 m)
- Listed weight: 212 lb (96 kg)

Career information
- High school: Kimball Union (Meriden, New Hampshire)
- College: Boston College
- NFL draft: 1971: 4th round, 93rd overall pick

Career history
- Cincinnati Bengals (1971–1972); Houston Oilers (1972–1976)

Awards and highlights
- First-team All-East (1970)

Career NFL statistics
- Rushing attempts: 780
- Rushing yards: 2,831
- Rushing touchdowns: 18
- Stats at Pro Football Reference

Frederick F. Willis III (December 9, 1947 – July 4, 2023) was an American professional football player who was a running back for six seasons in the National Football League (NFL) for the Cincinnati Bengals and Houston Oilers. He played college football for the Boston College Eagles and was selected by the Bengals in the fourth round of the 1971 NFL draft.

== Early life ==
Willis grew up in Natick, Massachusetts, and attended Marian High School in Framingham, Massachusetts, and Kimball Union Academy where he was an All-American High School and Prep School player, in 1966 Willis broke the all-time New England schoolboy scoring champion, a record that had been held since 1950 by Lorne (Tippy) Johnson of Lynn English High School. He starred in football as well as in hockey, where he was a forward who led the team to an undefeated season, a league title, and the state tournament. He considered football and hockey scholarship offers from Michigan State University and the University of Notre Dame, but decided to attend Boston College.

== College career ==
Willis played both football and hockey at Boston College, he was one of a few athletes to excel in 2 sports at an elite level. A halfback, he established a career rushing mark with 2,115 yards in three varsity seasons. He was the first Eagles' running back to surpass 1,000 yards rushing in a single season when he totaled 1,107 his senior year. He was voted All-America and All-East his senior season of 1970 and received the George H. "Bulger" Lowe Award (top football player in New England), and played in the postseason all-star Senior Bowl and Blue-Gray Game. He was also a top 6 forward for the Eagles' hockey team.

Willis was inducted into the Boston College Varsity Club Athletic Hall of Fame in 1977.

== Professional career ==
Willis was drafted in the fourth round (93rd overall) of the 1971 NFL draft by the Cincinnati Bengals. He posted similar statistics in each of his six years in the NFL, but during his rookie year of 1971, in which he played all 14 games, starting six at fullback, he had 593 rushing yards (a career best) on 135 attempts (a career-best 4.4 average) while scoring a career-best seven touchdowns. He also had 24 receptions for 223 yards (a 9.3 average).

In 1972, he played and started in the Bengals' first five games. On October 24, 1972 Willis was traded, along with fellow running back Paul Robinson, to the Houston Oilers for wide receiver Charlie Joiner and linebacker Ron Pritchard. For the Oilers, he played eight games, starting seven at fullback. His combined totals for both teams were 461 yards on 134 attempts (a 3.4 average) but he was especially effective receiving out of the backfield with 45 receptions for 297 yards (a 6.6 average) and two touchdowns.

In 1973, he started all 14 games, with 579 yards rushing on a career-high 171 attempts (a 3.4 average) and four touchdowns with career highs of 57 receptions and 371 yards (a 6.5 average) and one touchdown.

In 1974, his playing time went down as he played 10 games (with no starts) with 239 yards rushing in 74 attempts (a 3.2 average) and three touchdowns, with 25 receptions for 132 yards (a 5.2 average) and one touchdown.

He rebounded in 1975 with four starts in 13 games and 420 rushing yards on 118 attempts (a 3.6 average) and two touchdowns, along with 20 receptions for 104 yards (a 5.2 average).

His final year with the Oilers and in the NFL was 1976, but his production went up. He started in 12 of 13 games, with 542 yards in 148 attempts (a 3.7 average) and two touchdowns along with 32 receptions for 255 yards (an 8.0 average) and one touchdown.

Fred Willis was a union representative and Executive Board member for the National Football League Players Association.

Willis founded a concussion diagnosis and treatment company called HPN Neurologic. In April 2017, he was ordered by a federal judge to no longer distribute improper communications to other players regarding his activity in the company NFL Players Brains Matter. Willis later moved to found another company NeuroSport Concussion in 2019.

== NFL career statistics ==
Legend
**Bold**	Career high

Year	Team	Games		Rushing					Receiving				
Year	Team	GP	GS	Att	Yds	Avg	Lng	TD	Rec	Yds	Avg	Lng	TD
1971	CIN	**14**	6	135	**590**	**4.4**	36	**7**	24	223	**9.3**	29	0
1972	CIN	5	5	42	127	3.0	12	0	9	46	5.1	10	0
1972	HOU	8	7	92	334	3.6	43	0	36	251	7.0	27	**2**
1973	HOU	**14**	**14**	**171**	579	3.4	25	4	**57**	**371**	6.5	**50**	1
1974	HOU	10	5	74	239	3.2	18	3	25	130	5.2	21	1
1975	HOU	13	4	118	420	3.6	23	2	20	104	5.2	20	0
1976	HOU	13	12	148	542	3.7	**44**	2	32	255	8.0	42	1
Total		77	53	780	2,831	3.6	44	18	203	1,380	6.8	50	5

== Death ==
Willis died in Natick on July 4, 2023, at the age of 75.
