= Jo Dragotta =

American professional soccer defender

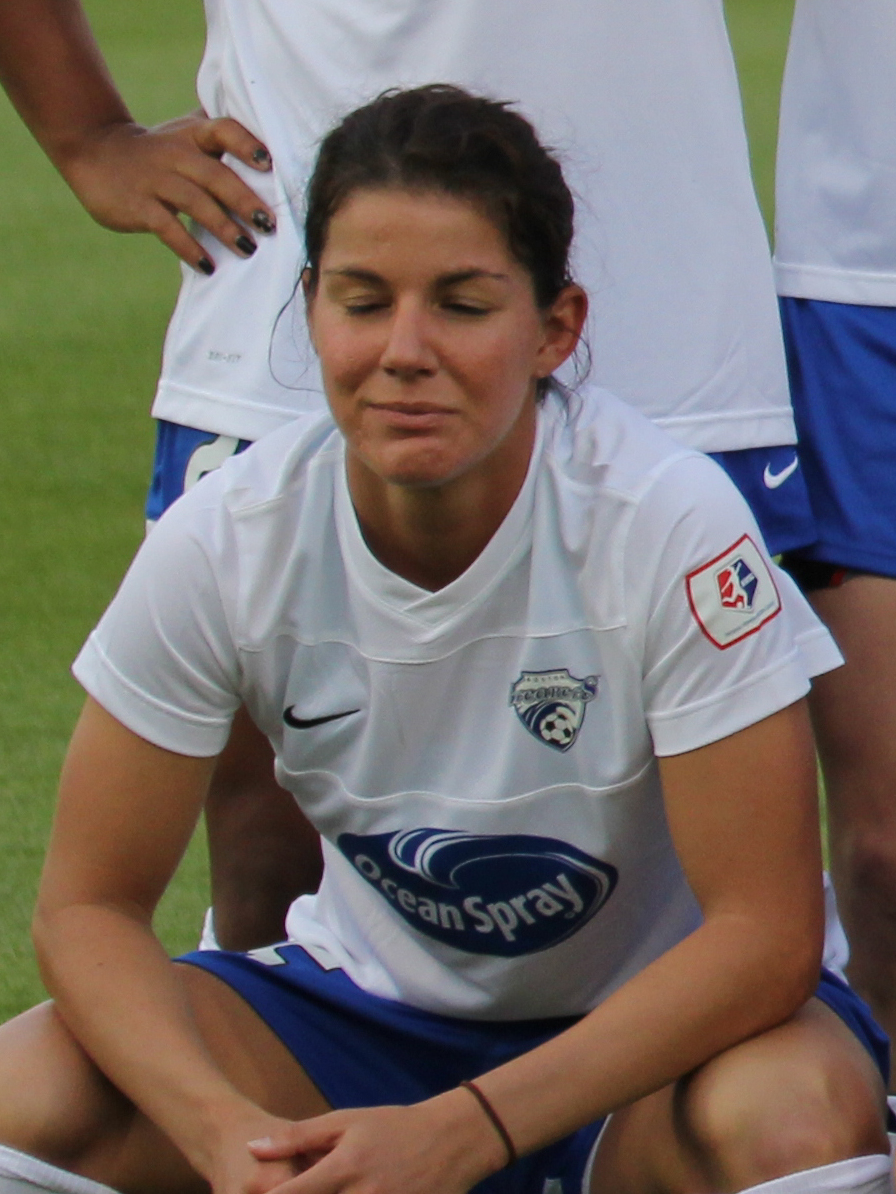

Personal information
- Full name: Jo Dragotta
- Date of birth: February 11, 1991 (age 35)
- Place of birth: Tampa, Florida
- Height: 5 ft 9 in (1.75 m)
- Position: Midfielder

College career
Years	Team	Apps	(Gls)
2009–2012	Florida Gators		

Senior career*
Years	Team	Apps	(Gls)
2013	Boston Breakers	10	(0)
- * Club domestic league appearances and goals

Jo Dragotta (born February 11, 1991) is an American former professional soccer defender who played for the Boston Breakers of the National Women's Soccer League (NWSL). She previously played college soccer for the University of Florida.

== Early life ==
Dragotta was born in Tampa, Florida, where she attended and played for Gaither High School for four seasons. Dragotta was a three-time All-Sunshine Conference and All-Hillsborough County selection. She scored 14 goals as a junior and 10 as a senior at Gaither H.S. Dragotta was coached in High school by former United States women's national soccer team coach George Fotopoulos. Dragotta was also a three-year member of Florida's Olympic Development Program's (ODP) state team. She was invited to the 2007 United Soccer Leagues Super Y-League ODP National camp, appeared on ESPN RISE top players list for Central Florida, was a five-year member of the Hillsborough County United Club Team that won the 2009 Florida Youth Soccer Association State Cup Under-19 championship and advanced to 2009 US Youth Soccer Region III tournament, her team also advanced to the 2008 Florida State U-19 semifinal. She was coached at HC United by Danielle Fotopoulos.

== College career ==
Dragotta attended the University of Florida, where she played for coach Becky Burleigh's Florida Gators women's soccer team in National Collegiate Athletic Association (NCAA) and Southeastern Conference (SEC) competition from 2009 to 2012. During her four-year college career, she played in 82 games, and started 53 of them, primarily as a midfielder, and was credited with seven goals and 11 assists. During her time as a Gator, the team won the regular season conference championship in 2009, 2010 and 2012, and the SEC Tournament in 2010 and 2012. As a senior in 2012, she was a first-team All-SEC selection. Dragotta graduated from the University of Florida in May 2013, with a bachelor's degree in anthropology.

== Club career ==
Dragotta was drafted by the Boston Breakers in the 3rd round, 21st overall in the inaugural 2013 NWSL College Draft.

== Career statistics ==
Appearances and goals by club, season and competition
Club	Season	League			Playoffs (Note: Includes NWSL playoffs)		Total	
Club	Season	Division	Apps	Goals	Apps	Goals	Apps	Goals
Boston Breakers	2013	NWSL	10	0	—		10	0
Career total			10	0	0	0	10	0

== Honors ==
Florida Gators

- SEC women's soccer tournament: 2010, 2012

Individual

- All-SEC First Team: 2012
