= Tom Meek =

American columnist (born 1956)

- Born: 1956 (age 69–70)
- Occupations: Author and Columnist
- Writing career
- Subjects: Computers; Internet Issues
- Literary movement: High-Tech

Tom Meek (born 1956) is an American columnist and author of "Another Day In Cyberville" published weekly in The Gainesville Voice, a New York Times regional newspaper, beginning in October, 2000 in The Gainesville Sun. "Cyberville" deals with issues related to high-tech, computers, New Media and Internet issues. Meek also writes musical and other occasional features on persons such as trumpeter Wynton Marsalis and American composer Joseph Byrd for publication in print and online, and is the author of online blogs dealing with media and music. Meek has also served as a media consultant for interests worldwide including the Fox Broadcasting Network, Swedish Televerket and numerous Fortune 500 companies, and is an expert witness certified by the United States Supreme Court on media and copyright issues related to cable television and broadcast television.

== Life and career ==
Meek originally began involvement in media by doing volunteer music programming at WIOT-FM at age 12. He then extended his involvement in music by serving as a DJ and sound and light engineer at the Catacombs Coffee House in Sylvania, Ohio from 1969 to 1972. Meek began his television career while still in high school as a producer for WSPD-TV in Toledo, Ohio in 1973. He also served as an Ohio county-level student coordinator in the 1972 presidential campaign of Senator George McGovern. He moved to Columbus, Ohio in 1976, where he worked as a music buyer for the Peaches Records chain. After spending a year in Boston, Massachusetts at Grahm Junior College in 1978–79, Meek moved to Gainesville, Florida and graduated from the University of Florida in 1982 with a degree in Communications while working at WUFT-TV and other media positions at the university from 1980 to 1982. In his final semester Meek helped launch a new graduate level communications degree program, serving as director and co-producer of a drama "Ernie Pyle, Here Is My War", winner of the 1982 Alpha Epsilon Rho Grand Prize for Drama.

Although he initially planned to pursue a journalism master's degree in Gainesville, Meek immediately began working as a producer and researcher at WFTV-TV, Orlando when offered a job in May, 1982. After two years producing a morning news and information program, he was hired at WOFL-TV in April, 1984, initially as Community Affairs Director, then as Station Operations Manager beginning in 1986. While at WOFL-TV, Meek wrote, produced and edited a number of documentaries, including a program on Louis Comfort Tiffany and the Charles Hosmer Morse Museum of American Art in Winter Park, Florida which was credited with helping keep the Morse collections intact for an eventual larger museum, and a program on the introduction of Health Maintenance Organizations (HMOs) into Central Florida, which won a medal at the New York International Film & Television Festival in 1984. Meek's television producing experience exceeds 500 programs including documentaries, information, telethons, talk and public service, several thousand program segments, and serving as Executive Producer for thousands more news and public service programs.

In 1987, at the request of several television stations, law firms and the Fox Broadcasting Network, Meek began a consulting practice in issues related to cable-broadcast television issues, which expanded to include a wide range of areas related to copyright, TV and radio station startups, disaster and strategic plans, Nielsen ratings, FAA airspace issues, digital television, tower construction and zoning issues, writing for print and television, multimedia production and other media issues. In 1989 Meek produced and moderated a set of four nationwide seminars for the NATPE Educational Foundation, which were seen as a groundbreaking effort to bring leaders of the broadcasting and cable industries directly together in a day-long event for the first time. In 1998 Meek expanded his consulting practice again to include computers, networks and Web design, with an additional added emphasis on skills training and Intranet/Internet Web-based collaboration.

Meek was repeatedly cited in the 1997 United States Supreme Court decision Turner Broadcasting vs. FCC, which established the must-carry rules regarding cable carriage of broadcast television stations in the United States, where Meek represented the Federal Communications Commission (FCC), United States Department of Justice, the National Association of Broadcasters (NAB), the Association of Local Television Stations (ALTV), and the Public Broadcasting Service (PBS), among others. Meek also produced research used by the U.S. Congress in passing the Satellite Home Viewer Act of 1988 governing the carriage of local television stations by Direct broadcast satellite providers. Meek has also been heavily involved in the rules governing syndicated program exclusivity ("Syndex") for broadcast television and "superstations" such as WGN-TV and WTBS-TV, submitting research in the United Video case which ruled in favor of Syndex . Meek maintains a Web page at the TVCCS site used by students and college classes in the U.S. concerning the history of must-carry and the Turner decision.

Meek is also a frequent guest on the WUFT-FM (Gainesville, FL) program "Conner Calling", hosted by Hank Conner, and has offered personal, online and satellite presentations to technical groups, professional and trade organizations, private business, museum docents, civic groups and secondary and college audiences nationwide on the use of the Internet, communications, computers, mobile television, public service rules for broadcast television, Louis Comfort Tiffany, television ratings, journalism and the history of must-carry and the Turner case for the past twenty years.

Meek also authors two blogs on media issues, "Reflections On Media" featuring information and reviews of recent media and music subjects, and "The Video Audio Overdose Galore" highlighting music and entertainment videos from online video and audio services. He is also the founder and moderator of CateraOwners, the world's largest owners group dedicated to the Cadillac Catera automobile, with more than 2000 members worldwide.

In 2007 Meek began authoring a weekly music events blog, "About & Out", for the Los-Angeles based music Web site LAJazz.com.
