= Larnel Coleman =

American gridiron football player (born 1998)

Profile
- Position: Offensive tackle

Personal information
- Born: June 22, 1998 (age 28); Malden, Massachusetts, U.S.
- Listed height: 6 ft 6 in (1.98 m)
- Listed weight: 310 lb (141 kg)

Career information
- High school: Saint Clement (Medford, Massachusetts)
- College: UMass (2016–2020)
- NFL draft: 2021: 7th round, 231st overall pick

Career history
- Miami Dolphins (2021–2022); Carolina Panthers (2022); Houston Roughnecks (2024)*; Birmingham Stallions (2024)*; Winnipeg Blue Bombers (2024)*; BC Lions (2024)*
- * Offseason or practice squad member only

Career NFL statistics
- Games played: 1
- Stats at Pro Football Reference

Larnel Coleman (born June 22, 1998) is an American professional football offensive tackle. He played college football at UMass, before being selected by the Miami Dolphins in the seventh round of the 2021 NFL draft.

== College career ==
Coleman was ranked as a two–star recruit by 247Sports.com coming out of high school. He committed to UMass on February 3, 2016. He converted from defensive end to offensive lineman in college.

== Professional career ==
Pre-draft measurables
Height	Weight	Arm length	Hand span	40-yard dash	10-yard split	20-yard split	20-yard shuttle	Three-cone drill	Vertical jump	Broad jump	Bench press
6 ft 6 1/4 in (1.99 m)	307 lb (139 kg)	36 1/4 in (0.92 m)	10 3/8 in (0.26 m)	5.17 s	1.83 s	3.03 s	4.69 s	7.69 s	31.0 in (0.79 m)	9 ft 5 in (2.87 m)	24 reps
All values from Pro Day

=== Miami Dolphins ===
Coleman was selected by the Miami Dolphins in the seventh round (231st pick) of the 2021 NFL draft on May 1, 2021. On May 13, Coleman signed his four-year rookie contract with Miami. He was placed on injured reserve on August 31.

On August 30, 2022, Coleman was waived by the Dolphins and re-signed to the practice squad.

=== Carolina Panthers ===
On October 25, 2022, Coleman was signed by the Carolina Panthers off the Dolphins' practice squad. He was released on August 26, 2023.

=== Houston Roughnecks ===
On December 13, 2023, Coleman signed with the Houston Roughnecks of the XFL. The Roughnecks' brand was transferred to the Houston Gamblers when the XFL and the United States Football League merged to create the United Football League (UFL).

=== Birmingham Stallions ===
On January 15, 2024, Coleman was selected by the Birmingham Stallions with the eighth overall pick in the Super Draft portion of the 2024 UFL dispersal draft. He was released on March 10.

=== Winnipeg Blue Bombers ===
On March 19, 2024, Coleman signed with the Winnipeg Blue Bombers of the Canadian Football League (CFL). At the end of training camp, he was initially added to the practice roster on June 2, 2024, but was outright released the next day.

=== BC Lions ===
On September 3, 2024, it was announced that Coleman had signed a practice roster agreement with the BC Lions. He was released on October 20, 2024.
