= Brian Shannon =

Author and technical analyst (born 1967)

- Born: November 16, 1967 (age 58); Aurora, Colorado, United States
- Education: Merrimack College
- Occupations: Writer, technical analyst, trader
- Writing career
- Notable works: Technical Analysis Using Multiple Timeframes (2008); Maximum Trading Gains with Anchored VWAP (2023)
- Website: alphatrends.net

Brian Shannon, CMT (born November 16, 1967) is an American author and technical analyst known for his work in financial education, particularly regarding technical analysis and trading strategies.

== Early life and education ==
Shannon was born in Denver, and raised in Andover, Massachusetts. He became interested in trading at an early age, making his first stock purchase at age 13.

Shannon graduated from Austin Preparatory School in 1986 and earned a Bachelor of Arts in Business Management from Merrimack College in 1991.

== Career ==
Following college, Shannon worked for several brokerage and trading firms, including Thomas James, Lehman Brothers, Tucker Anthony, Dain Bosworth, and MarketWise Securities, where he served as lead trader and director of research. He later founded Alphatrends, a trading education platform, in 2006.

Over the course of his career he has held Series 7, 24, and 63 licenses, and in 2013 he earned the Chartered Market Technician (CMT) designation.

Shannon's trading approach focuses primarily on technical analysis and trend trading, with an emphasis on price action. He is known for using tools such as the Volume-weighted average price (VWAP) and moving averages in his analysis.

Shannon has appeared on financial media, including CNBC, and has contributed to trading education through seminars, webinars, and written content.

== Books ==
Shannon is the author of Technical Analysis Using Multiple Timeframes (2008), which introduces concepts such as market structure, trend alignment, and risk management for traders.

In 2023, he published Maximum Trading Gains With Anchored VWAP, detailing applications of the Anchored VWAP indicator in trading.

Both books address risk management as a central topic.

== Educational Work ==
Since 2006, Shannon has provided educational resources for traders through Alphatrends, including blog posts and video updates. The blog was called the "YouTube of technical analysis" by the editor of Technical Analysis of Stocks & Commodities in describing Shannon's teaching and occasional reviews of the Wallstrip stock of the day picks. As of 2010, over 400 people subscribed to Shannon's trading service.

He has focused on helping traders understand technical analysis, price action, and risk management strategies. His educational materials discuss the application of technical indicators and tools, as well as the importance of planning and discipline in trading.

== Mentoring and Influence ==
Shannon has mentored traders in technical analysis and trading techniques, and his work has been cited by other traders and authors. He has participated in the trading community through social media and various trading networks.

== Personal life ==
Shannon has two sons and resides in Denver, Colorado.

== Bibliography ==
- Shannon, Brian. Technical Analysis Using Multiple Timeframes. (2008)
- Shannon, Brian. Maximum Trading Gains with Anchored VWAP. (2023)
