= Eddie Palladino =

American public address announcer

- Born: February 7, 1958 (age 68); East Boston, Massachusetts, United States
- Education: Grahm Junior College; Emerson College
- Occupation: Public address announcer
- Children: 2 daughters

Edward "Eddie" Palladino (born February 7, 1958) is an American public address announcer for the Boston Celtics in the National Basketball Association.

== Early life ==
Palladino, a native of East Boston and lifelong Celtics fan, has served as arena voice for the Celtics since the beginning of the 2003–04 NBA season. He attended Savio Preparatory High School in East Boston and then went on to Grahm Junior College from 1975 to 1977 where he earned an associate degree in Communications. He continued his education at Emerson College from 1977 to 1979 earning a B.S. in Communications, Digital and Media Arts.

Played goaltender for the Bayswater Braves, an East Boston summer street hockey team.

== Career ==
A Celtics season ticket holder, during the '70s and '80s, Palladino called the 2008 NBA playoffs and 2024 NBA playoffs at the TD Garden and saw the Celtics clinch their 17th & 18th NBA Championship. Palladino also called the 2010 NBA Finals against the Lakers, and the 2022 NBA Finals against the Golden State Warriors.

== Personal life ==
Palladino now resides in Saugus, Massachusetts with his wife and two daughters and son. He also has two granddaughters, Audrina and Madison.

Preceded by Eric Frede & Dave Jageler	Boston Celtics Public Address Announcer; 2003–present	Succeeded by current
