= Gary LaPierre =

American radio and TV journalist (1942–2019)

- LaPierre at WBZ
- Born: April 14, 1942; Shelburne Falls, Massachusetts
- Died: February 4, 2019 (aged 76); Ipswich, Massachusetts
- Education: Grahm Junior College
- Occupation: Radio broadcaster
- Years active: 1961–2006
- Known for: WBZ (AM) radio news anchor

Gary LaPierre (April 14, 1942 – February 4, 2019) was a radio and television journalist, who spent most of his career with WBZ, an all-news radio station in Boston, Massachusetts. He also made appearances on WBZ-TV's news broadcasts, often filling in as a substitute anchor. LaPierre retired in 2006 after 40 years at the anchor desk. He had started at WBZ in 1964 as a general news reporter. One of his first assignments was covering the arrival of the Beatles, when they came to greater Boston to perform.

== Early life and career ==
Born in Shelburne Falls, Massachusetts, LaPierre graduated from Grahm Junior College and attended the University of New Hampshire and Boston University. His first job in radio was with WHAV in Haverhill, Massachusetts, in 1961. He then worked briefly in New Hampshire before joining WBZ, where he would work for a total of 43 years.

LaPierre was heard on WBZ for a number of years giving a daily commentary, "LaPierre on the Loose". He was also heard doing commercials for various advertisers. In 1999, he played Ebenezer Scrooge in WBZ's adaptation of the Charles Dickens classic, A Christmas Carol. This version has been played every Christmas Eve since then.

== Personal life ==
LaPierre was married, and had two sons. He underwent heart bypass surgery in 2005. He died at his home in Ipswich, Massachusetts, on February 4, 2019, from leukemia at age 76.

== Honors and awards ==
In 1998, LaPierre received an honorary Doctor of Humane Letters from Emerson College. He was also inducted in the Massachusetts Broadcasters Hall of Fame, in 2010. Other awards include:

- Gold Award for Best Newsman of the Year, at the International Radio Festival in New York City (1986)
- Lifetime Achievement Award, from the March of Dimes Achievement in Radio Organization (1997)
- Edward R. Murrow Award for Best Radio Newscast, presented by the Radio-Television News Directors Association (1998)
- Associated Press Award for Documentary of the Year
- San Francisco Award for Best Investigative Journalism
