= Mariah Bullock =

Samoan footballer

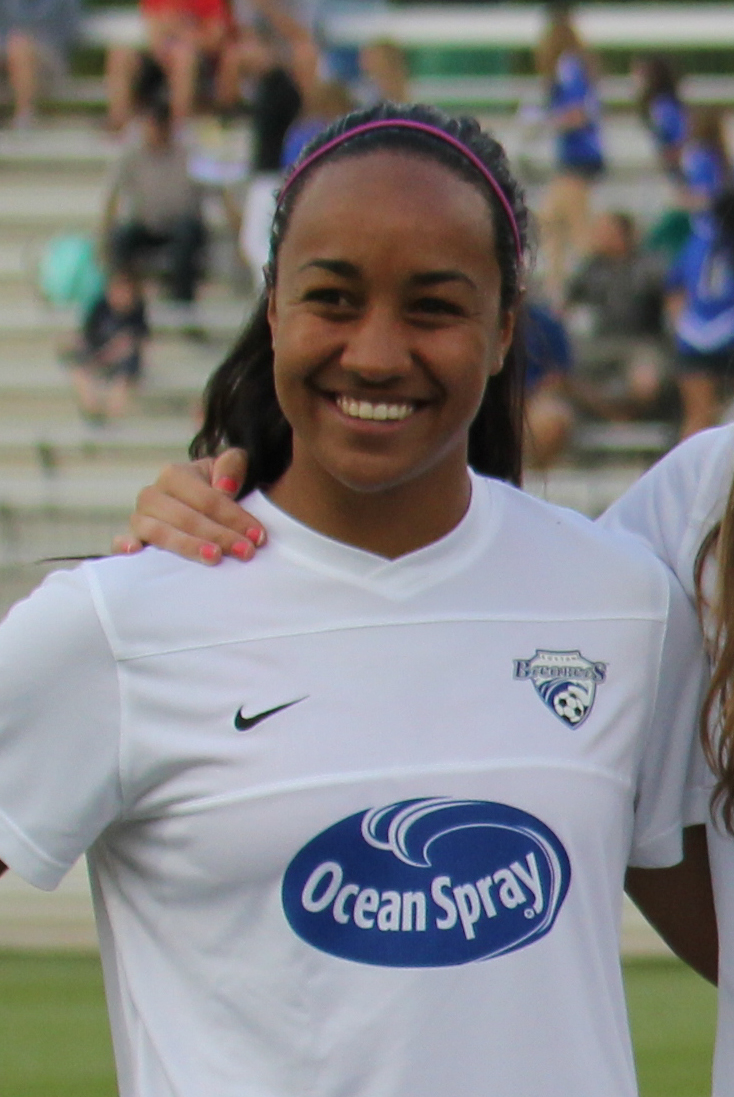

Personal information
- Full name: Mariah Meaalii Bullock
- Birth name: Mariah Meaalii Nogueira
- Date of birth: 22 February 1991 (age 35)
- Place of birth: Huntington Beach, California, United States
- Height: 1.73 m (5 ft 8 in)
- Position: Defender

College career
Years	Team	Apps	(Gls)
2009–2012	Stanford Cardinal		

Senior career*
Years	Team	Apps	(Gls)
2013	Boston Breakers	20	(3)
2014–2015	Seattle Reign FC	28	(1)

International career^{‡}
2010–2013	United States U-23		
2018–	Samoa	8	(0)
- * Club domestic league appearances and goals ‡ National team caps and goals as of 20 July 2019

Mariah Meaalii Bullock (née Nogueira; born 22 February 1991) is an American-born Samoan professional footballer who plays as a midfielder for the Samoa women's national team.

A former United States youth international, Bullock has played in the professional National Women's Soccer League for the Boston Breakers and Seattle Reign FC.

== Early life ==
Bullock was born in Huntington Beach, California to Doreen Meaalii Nogueira and Rubens Nogueira, and was raised in the fellow Orange County city of Westminster. She attended and played for Marina High School in Huntington Beach, California. She earned NSCAA Youth All-America and High School Scholar-Athlete All-America honors and was named an ESPN All-American while captaining the team for three years. She earned Sunset League MVP honors, was named to the All-Orange County first team three times and the All-Southern Section first team twice. She was named Marina Female Athlete of the Year twice. While playing for Cal South, she won three State Cups with the team. She also played for the regional Olympic Development Program (ODP) team. In 2009, she was rated in the top twenty college prospects by ESPN Rise and was ranked 27th in the country by Top Drawer Soccer. She played club soccer for Slammers FC.

=== Stanford Cardinal ===
Bullock attended Stanford University where she majored in Psychology. She was a starter for the Stanford Cardinal from 2009 to 2012. During her freshman season, she scored five goals ranking fifth on the team. She scored her first goal off a header against Notre Dame and scored a brace against Wisconsin. She was named to the NSCAA All-Pacific Region first team, NSCAA third-team All-American, All-Pac-10 first team, and Pac-10 All-Freshman team. She also earned the Pac-10's Newcomer of the Year award.

As a sophomore in 2010, Bullock scored five goals ranking fourth on the team. She was named to the NSCAA first-team All-Pacific Region team, All-Pac-10 second-team and received a Pac-10 All-Academic honorable mention. She was also named to the MAC Hermann Trophy Watch List. She scored the game-opening goal in the NCAA quarterfinals helping the Cardinal defeat Florida State 5–0. The following year, she scored four game-winning goals during her junior season all with her head. During the first two rounds of the NCAA tournament, she scored the game-opening goals in each match. Post season, she received All-Pac-12 and Pac-12 All-Academic honorable mentions.

During her last season with the Cardinal, Bullock's seven goals ranked second on the team. As team captain, she finished her collegiate career with 21 goals and 15 assists. 15 of the 21 goals she scored throughout her time with the Cardinal were equalizer goals or put Stanford ahead in the match. Her 95 career starts tied for third in the program's history. Following her senior season, she earned Pac-12 Scholar Athlete of the Year honors and was named to the National Soccer Coaches Association of America (NSCAA) (NSCAA) All-American team. She was also named to the NSCAA All-Pacific Region first team, All-Pac-12 first team, and Pac-12 All-Academic second team selection.

== Club career ==
=== Boston Breakers, 2013 ===
Bullock was selected in the second round (13th overall) of the 2013 NWSL College Draft by the Boston Breakers for the inaugural season of the National Women's Soccer League draft. As a midfielder, she played in 20 of the team's 22 matches during the 2013 season with 16 starts. She scored her first goal of the season in a match against the Seattle Reign FC in which the Breakers lost 1–2. She scored two additional goals in matches against Sky Blue FC and Washington Spirit helping the Breakers win both games. The Breakers finished the 2013 season fifth in the league with an 8–6–8 record.

=== Seattle Reign FC, 2014–2015 ===
In October 2013, Bullock was traded to the Seattle Reign FC in exchange for two third round draft picks. Of the trade she said, "I'm grateful for everything the Boston Breakers provided me in my first professional season and am excited for the new challenge and growth potential that Seattle offers."

During the 2014 season, the Reign set a league record unbeaten streak of 16 games during the first part of the season. During the 16 game stretch, the team compiled a 13–0–3 record. The Reign finished first in the regular season clinching the NWSL Shield for the first time. After defeating the Washington Spirit 2–1 in the playoff semi-finals, the Reign were defeated 2–1 by FC Kansas City during the championship final. Bullock finished the 2014 season with one assist and started in 6 of the 13 games in which she played.

During the 2015 season, the Reign finished the regular season in first place becoming the first team to win the NWSL Shield two consecutive years. The team advanced to the playoffs where they faced Washington Spirit in a semi-final match on September 13, 2015 in Seattle. Bullock's goal two minutes before stoppage time lifted the Reign to a 3–0 win. The team faced FC Kansas City in the final and was defeated 1–0.

In September 2015, Bullock announced her retirement from professional soccer choosing to pursue a doctorate degree in Psychology. After completing her PhD in 2020, she returned to the club as its sports psychologist and mental health counselor.

== International career ==
Bullock was eligible to play for the United States, Brazil, Samoa and American Samoa.

Bullock represented the United States at various youth levels. She was selected to participate in the U.S. under-15 camp in 2006. She has played for the U.S. under-20 and under-23 teams.

Bullock played with Samoa women's national football team at 2018 OFC Women's Nations Cup and 2019 Pacific Games.

== Personal life ==
Bullock's father is Brazilian and her mother is Samoan. She has a younger brother Matheus and is married to former Stanford Cardinal basketball player Elliott Bullock.

After retirement from professional soccer, Bullock earned a PhD in clinical psychology in 2020 from Brigham Young University. She now works as a sports psychologist for the Nebraska Cornhuskers and—on a contract basis—for her former club OL Reign.

== Honors ==
Seattle Reign FC

- NWSL Shield: 2014, 2015

== See also ==
- List of Stanford University people
