= Grahm Junior College =

College in Boston, Massachusetts, U.S.

Coordinates: 42°20′54.40″N 71°05′40.40″W

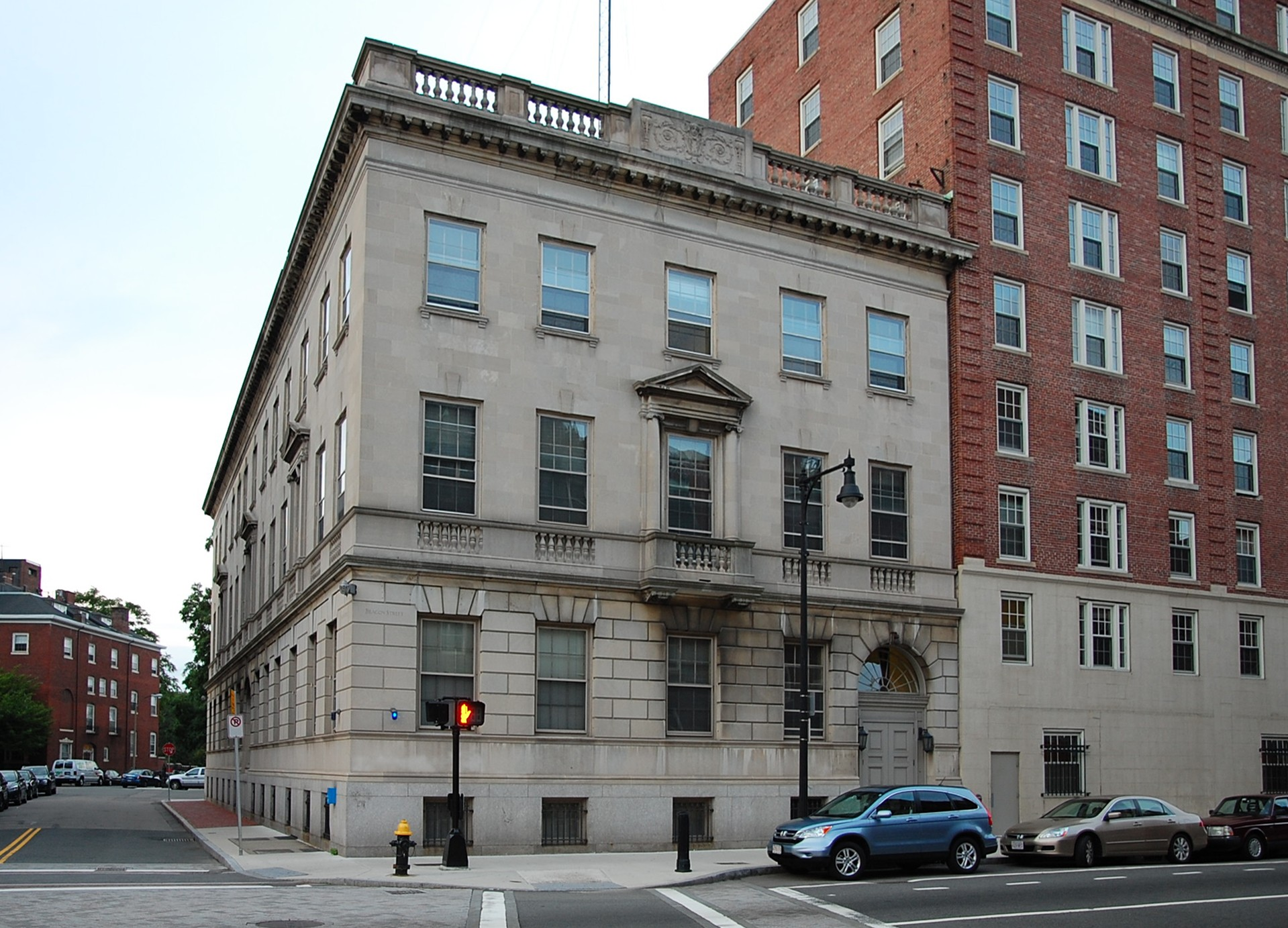
A former Grahm building, now the Myles Annex owned by Boston University

Grahm Junior College was a non-profit junior college located in Boston, Massachusetts. It opened in 1951 under the name Cambridge School, as part of a chain of schools that started in New York City and later included Chicago and Philadelphia branches. It was accredited in 1964 as a business school and later expanded to include radio and TV broadcasting. It was renamed Grahm Junior College in 1968. The college radio station and a closed-circuit television station were known as WCSB.

== History ==
The school opened in 1951 under the name Cambridge School, as part of a private chain of schools based in New York City. Originally located at 18 Tremont Street, it moved to 120 Boylston Street, then to 687 Boylston Street, and finally to Kenmore Square. The 687 Boylston Street building, "The Kensington" had two lions flanking the entrance, and the school therefore adopted the lion as its mascot. The same lions now flank the entrance to the Fairmont Copley Hotel. The Cambridge School became accredited as a Junior College of business in 1964 and later expanded its offerings to include secretarial studies, hospitality, and radio and TV broadcasting.

At its peak enrollment of 1,300 students in 1968, the school occupied 4 buildings in Boston's Kenmore Square, the notable Hotel Kenmore (dormitories), Wadsworth Hall (dormitories) the present-day Hotel Buckminster (dormitories and classrooms) and 632 Beacon Street (offices, classrooms and broadcast studios). The Cambridge School purchased 632 Beacon Street in May 1965 from the Hotel Corporation of America. It had been previously owned by the Lumber Mutual Insurance Company. Sale price was purported to be under three million dollars. The Kenmore Hotel was purchased by the Cambridge School in 1965. The Saint George Hotel (circa 1911) was purchased in 1966 (appraised at $300,000) and renamed Leavitt Hall.

In 1968, the school was renamed Grahm Junior College after its long-term president, Milton L. Grahm. In September of the same year, it was restructured as a non-profit institution. In 1969, the college announced a $6 million development program, including $500,000 of equipment. It included two television studios and radio studios. The library was expanded and 14 classrooms were added. A physical education facility, classrooms, offices and an endowment were envisioned, but never realized. In 1974, the school received accreditation by the New England Association of Schools and Colleges.

By 1974, enrollment at Grahm was declining, attributed by many to the end of the military draft and the rise of the community college system. In the mid-1970s many two-year colleges began to close or shed buildings or other assets. The Boston Globe reported that 30 out of 40 two year and trade schools closed between 1970 and 1980. In early 1977, Grahm's financial distress was publicly disclosed. Enrollment had declined 12 percent in three years. Staff salaries were cut and others were laid off. Fuel bills and inability to refinance were cited by the college administration as primary causes.

In March 1977, Grahm Junior College filed for reorganization under the bankruptcy code, citing $3 million in assets and $3.326 million in liabilities. Creditors repossessed much of the school's instructional assets in April 1979. Faculty continued to teach without pay in order for the final class to graduate, and the school closed that summer. Boston University purchased 632 Beacon St. (Myles Annex), 490 Commonwealth (Kenmore Hall) and the adjacent Wadsworth Hall in October 1979. The rights to the academic programs were acquired by Mount Ida College.

The school closed in 1979.

== Alumni activities ==
Reunions have been held beginning at the turn of the millennium, and there are alumni groups on social media.

== Notable alumni ==
- Jon Butcher, rock musician, freelance multimedia producer
- Tom Cheek, radio play-by-play announcer for the Toronto Blue Jays and Baseball Hall of FameClass of 2013 member, attended 1960-1
- JP Dellacamera, sportscaster for Atlanta Thrashers (NHL), New York Red Bulls (MLS). Broadcast Women's World Cup game for ABC. Graduated 1972.
- Micki Dickoff, writer, director and producer, Emmy Award winner, Humanitas Prize nominee
- Don Earle, play-by-play announcer for the Boston Bruins and Philadelphia Flyers
- Paul Fusco, writer/producer, creator of ALF, graduated 1973
- Andy Kaufman, entertainer/comedian, graduated 1971
- Jason Haikara, Co-President at Filmaka, Co-Chair at Academy of Television Arts & Sciences Website Committee, former Senior Vice President, Marketing at Fox Broadcasting Company, attended 1978–79
- Gary LaPierre, anchor of the WBZ morning radio news for 43 years
- Tom Meek, writer/producer/expert witness, attended 1978–79
- Marc Summers, TV host, TV producer, author, (Double Dare, Food Network), graduated 1973
- Otto Felix, motion picture and television actor, acting teacher and still photographer, graduated March 1965
- Eddie Palladino, Announcer for the Boston Celtics. graduated 1977
- Bob Fouracre, American sportscaster
- John Cigna, American radio personality, KDKA
