= Peter Cronan =

American football player (born 1955)

No. 57, 54
- Position: Linebacker

Personal information
- Born: January 13, 1955 (age 71); Bourne, Massachusetts, U.S.
- Listed height: 6 ft 0 in (1.83 m)
- Listed weight: 238 lb (108 kg)

Career information
- High school: Framingham (MA) Marian
- College: Boston College
- NFL draft: 1977: 2nd round, 51st overall pick

Career history
- Seattle Seahawks (1977–1981); Washington Redskins (1981–1985)

Awards and highlights
- Super Bowl champion (XVII); Nils V. "Swede" Nelson Award (1976); 2× First-team All-East (1975, 1976)

Career NFL statistics
- Sacks: 2
- Fumble recoveries: 7
- Interceptions: 2
- Stats at Pro Football Reference

Peter Joseph Cronan (born January 13, 1955) is an American former professional football player who was a linebacker in the National Football League (NFL) for the Washington Redskins and Seattle Seahawks. He played both defensive line and linebacker during his college football career with the Boston College Eagles and was an All-East performer. Selected 51st overall by the Seattle Seahawks in the second round of the 1977 NFL draft. He was traded to the Washington Redskins where he earned two Super Bowl rings as Captain of the special teams. He has been the color commentator on the Boston College radio broadcasts since 1988. His broadcast partners have included, Gil Santos, Dale Arnold, Dick Lutsk, Sean McDonough, Sean Grande, John Rooke, and his current partner Jon Meterparel.
