= Sacred Heart Schools (Kingston, Massachusetts) =

Location
- 399 Bishop's Highway; Kingston, (Plymouth County), Massachusetts 02364; United States; 41°56′47″N 70°44′9″W

Information
- Type: Private, Coeducational
- Motto: "Veritas et Caritas" (Truth and Love)
- Religious affiliation: Roman Catholicism
- Established: 1947
- Principal: Lydia Steele
- Grades: PreK–8
- Average class size: 25
- Campus size: 25 acres (100,000 m^{2})
- Colors: Royal Blue and Scarlet Red
- Song: All Hail Dear Sacred Heart
- Accreditation: New England Association of Schools and Colleges
- Tuition: $8,750 - $14,850
- Website: www.sacredheartkingston.com

Sacred Heart School is a private parochial school of Roman Catholic denomination in Kingston, Massachusetts. The school is located in the Roman Catholic Archdiocese of Boston. The school is operated by the Sisters of Divine Providence and educates students in grades kindergarten through eighth grade. It was establishment in 1947. It is made up of three schools, an elementary school, a pre-primary (kindergarten) school, and an intermediate school. Masses are held monthly and on special occasions in either the auditorium or in the chapel.

The three schools, a summer camp, and the Provincial Residence are also located on the extensive campus.

In the 2018–2019 school year the Catholic order spent $2.2 million to keep the high school open, but after that time no longer had the money to do so. In 2020 the school system announced that its high school division would close.

During the Blizzard of 2026, a large accumulation (~20 inches) of heavy, wet snow fell in the Kingston area. The roof of the adjacent Student Activities Center, or SAC, collapsed under the weight of this snow, destroying the gymnasium and heavily damaging much of the building.
