= Austin Preparatory School =

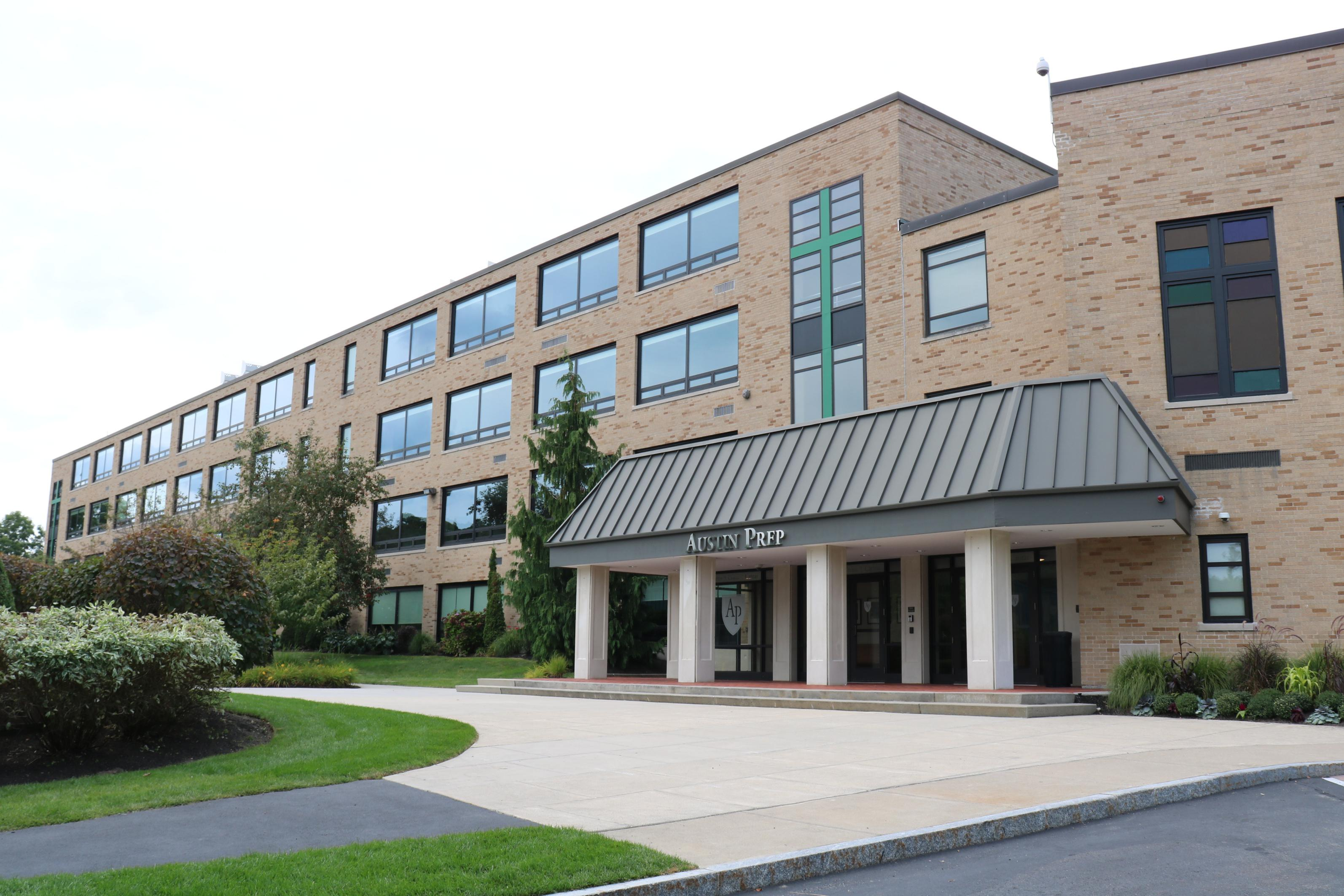

Location
- 101 Willow Street; Reading, Massachusetts 01867; United States; 42°31′47″N 71°7′37″W

Information
- Type: Private, Coeducational
- Motto: Unitas, Veritas, Caritas (To inspire hearts to unite, minds to inquire and hands to serve)
- Religious affiliation: Catholic
- Patron saint: Saint Augustine
- Established: 1961
- Head of School: Dr. James Hickey
- Faculty: 70
- Grades: 6–12
- Enrollment: 776 (2025)
- Campus: Suburban
- Colors: Green, White and Black
- Athletics conference: New England Preparatory School Athletic Council (NEPSAC)
- Mascot: Cougar
- Team name: Cougars
- Accreditation: New England Association of Schools and Colleges
- Publication: Tolle Lege (literary/art magazine)
- Newspaper: The Legend
- Tuition: $35,280 (2025–26)
- Website: www.austinprep.org

Austin Preparatory School, known as Austin Prep, is a co-educational Catholic school for students in grades 6 to 12 located in Reading, Massachusetts within the Roman Catholic Archdiocese of Boston. It was founded by the Order of Saint Augustine in 1961.

== History ==
Austin Preparatory School was founded by the Order of Saint Augustine in 1961 and opened its doors to students in 1963. Initially established as an all-boys Catholic school, it began with a small enrollment and held its first graduation in 1966. Over time, the school transitioned to a coeducational model and expanded both its academic and extracurricular offerings.

== Leadership ==
Dr. James Hickey has served as head of school since 2013. During his tenure, Austin Prep has achieved full enrollment, expanded its faculty, and invested approximately $22 million in campus upgrades. In 2022, the school left the Massachusetts Interscholastic Athletic Association (MIAA) and joined the New England Preparatory School Athletic Council (NEPSAC), a move Hickey described as improving the athletic experience for students and coaches.

In 2025, Hickey was recognized nationally as one of nine Catholic school educators to receive the National Catholic Educational Association’s Lead. Learn. Proclaim. Award, which honors outstanding contributions to Catholic education.

== Academics ==
Austin Preparatory School emphasizes college preparatory education with strong outcomes for its graduates. The Class of 2024 included 151 students who were admitted to leading colleges and universities across the United States, Europe, and Australia. Graduates received offers from Ivy League institutions, New England Small College Athletic Conference (NESCAC) schools, U.S. News & World Report-ranked liberal arts colleges and universities, and flagship public universities nationwide. Three graduates entered the United States Naval Academy, while one enrolled at the United States Military Academy at West Point.

In addition, 34 graduates from the Class of 2024 committed to continuing their athletic careers at the collegiate level, representing 22.5 percent of the class. By comparison, the NCAA estimates that only about 6 percent of U.S. high school athletes compete in college athletics.

=== Harvard Medical School Collaboration ===
Austin Preparatory School offers a physics course in partnership with Harvard Medical School’s MEDscience program, in which students spend time between the classroom at Austin Prep and the MEDscience labs at Harvard Medical School. They also present robotics projects to a panel in a “Shark Tank” style event.

== Athletics ==
On January 20, 2022, the school announced that it would leave the Catholic Central League and Massachusetts Interscholastic Athletic Association to join the New England Preparatory School Athletic Council starting in the fall of 2022. The school will begin NEPSAC competition as an independent.

=== Baseball ===
In June 2022, the Austin Prep baseball team won its third Massachusetts Interscholastic Athletic Association (MIAA) Division 3 state championship in six seasons, defeating Newburyport 2–1 at LeLacheur Park in Lowell. Postseason success has been a consistent theme for the program, which also won Catholic Central League championships in 2017, 2018, and 2019.

Following its 2022 title, the school transitioned from the MIAA to the New England Prep Schools Athletic Conference (NEPSAC). In its first NEPSAC season in 2023, Austin Prep finished with an 18–4 record. However, the team was not eligible for postseason play, as the school had yet to gain acceptance into a NEPSAC league, and one early application was rejected.

In 2025, junior outfielder Bradley McCafferty was named the Gatorade Baseball Player of the Year for Massachusetts, becoming the first Austin Prep player to earn the honor.

=== Girls' cross country ===
In November 2022, the Austin Prep girls' cross country team won the school's first New England Preparatory School Athletic Council (NEPSAC) championship, taking the Division II title at St. Mark's School in Southborough, Massachusetts. The team won its second Division II championship on November 14, 2026, at Suffield Academy in Connecticut, finishing with 89 points ahead of Middlesex School (98) and Groton School (99).

=== Competitive Cheer ===
In November 2025, the Austin Prep Competitive Cheer team won the Massachusetts State Athletic Association (MSAA) Division 4 State Championship at Worcester State University. The squad advanced to the state finals after capturing first place at the Division 4 North Regionals earlier in the season, and the program was led by head coach Alicia Harrington.

=== Girls' soccer ===
In 2026, Austin Prep's girls' soccer team finished the regular season with a 14–0–4 record, its first undefeated regular season since joining the New England Preparatory School Athletic Council (NEPSAC).

=== Alpine skiing ===
In the 2025-2026 season, Austin Prep won both the boys' and girls' Central Massachusetts Ski League (CMSL) alpine skiing championships. The girls' team won its third consecutive CMSL title with 1,731 points, while the boys' team won the program's first CMSL championship with 1,900 points.

=== Girls basketball ===
In 2026, senior center Fope Ayo was named the Gatorade Massachusetts Girls Basketball Player of the Year, becoming the first Austin Prep girls basketball player to earn the honor.

== Arts ==
Austin Prep stages an annual student production of The Nutcracker, which began in the mid-1990s and involves nearly 200 performers from grades 6–12 in roles including classical ballet, acting, comedy, and storytelling. The production is directed by Marla Pascucci-Byrne, chair of the Art & Design Department and a longtime English and dance faculty member, who founded the school’s dance program and has directed the Nutcracker for more than three decades. In 2025, the Nutcracker is scheduled to be performed at the Collins Center for the Performing Arts in Andover, Massachusetts.

== Notable alumni ==
- Thomas Birmingham, former Massachusetts Senate President
- Tom Fitzgerald '86, general manager and executive Vice President of the New Jersey Devils and former NHL player
- James M. Lindsay '77, senior vice president of the Council on Foreign Relations
- Blaise MacDonald '81, current head hockey coach at Colby College
- Brian Shannon '86, author and analyst in the financial field
- Paul Sullivan '75, radio talk show host at WBZ until his death in 2007
