= Lisa Cole =

American soccer coach and former player

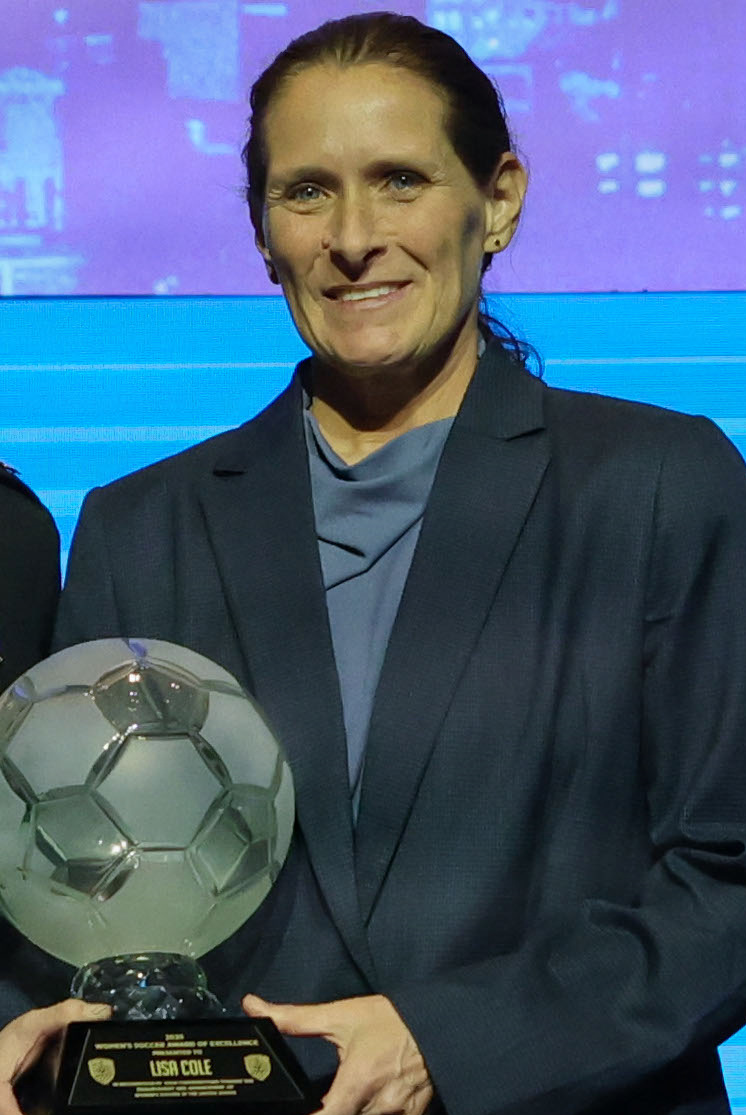
- Cole receiving award at the 2026 United Soccer Coaches Convention

Personal information
- Date of birth: May 14, 1973 (age 53)
- Place of birth: United States
- Position: Goalkeeper

Team information
- Current team: Zambia (technical advisor)

College career
| Years | Team | Apps | (Gls) |
| 1993–1997 | Pacific Lutheran University | | |

Managerial career
- 1997–2000: University of Mississippi (assistant)
- 2000–2003: University of Connecticut (assistant)
- 2003–2004: University of Rhode Island
- 2005–2006: Florida State University (assistant)
- 2009–2011: Boston Breakers (assistant)
- 2012–2013: Boston Breakers
- 2015–2017: Papua New Guinea U20
- 2018: Houston Dash (assistant)
- 2019–2021: Antigua and Barbuda
- 2021–2023: Fiji
- 2023–: Zambia (advisor)

Lisa Cole (born May 14, 1973) is an American women's soccer coach and former player, who is a technical advisor for the Zambia women's national football team. She was previously the head coach of the Fiji women's national football team and is most known for being the former head coach for the Boston Breakers in the National Women's Soccer League (NWSL).

== Early life ==
Cole graduated from Kentridge High School in Kent, Washington, and attended Pacific Lutheran University in Parkland from 1993 to 1997, where she competed in four years of collegiate women's soccer. A goalkeeper in her playing days, Cole held the school records for most saves in both a season and career as of 2012. She graduated from Pacific Lutheran University with a Bachelor of Arts degree in Physical Education and a minor in coaching.

== Coaching career ==
=== International ===
Cole has served in multiple international coaching roles. In 2018, she assisted the US Soccer U17 Women's National team during their August trip to South Korea in preparation for the FIFA U17 Women's World Cup. From 2015 to 2017, Cole served as the head coach of the Papua New Guinea U20 Women's National Team in their run up to and during the 2016 FIFA U20 Women's World Cup. Papua New Guinea did not have a national team program prior to her being hired for the position and the team drew Sweden, Brazil, and North Korea in World Cup Group A. While finishing 0–3 in Group A, the team scored their only goal of the tournament against eventual champion North Korea. In August 2019, she was hired as the Antigua and Barbuda Football Association's director of women's football and senior women's national team head coach. Cole also helped launch a seven-team Antiguan national league.

On 16 December 2021, Cole was appointed head coach of the Fiji women's national football team. Her contract was not renewed in 2023 after Fiji failed to qualify for the 2023 FIFA Women's World Cup qualification playoff. In June 2023, she joined the World Cup-bound Zambia women's national football team as a technical advisor.

=== Professional ===
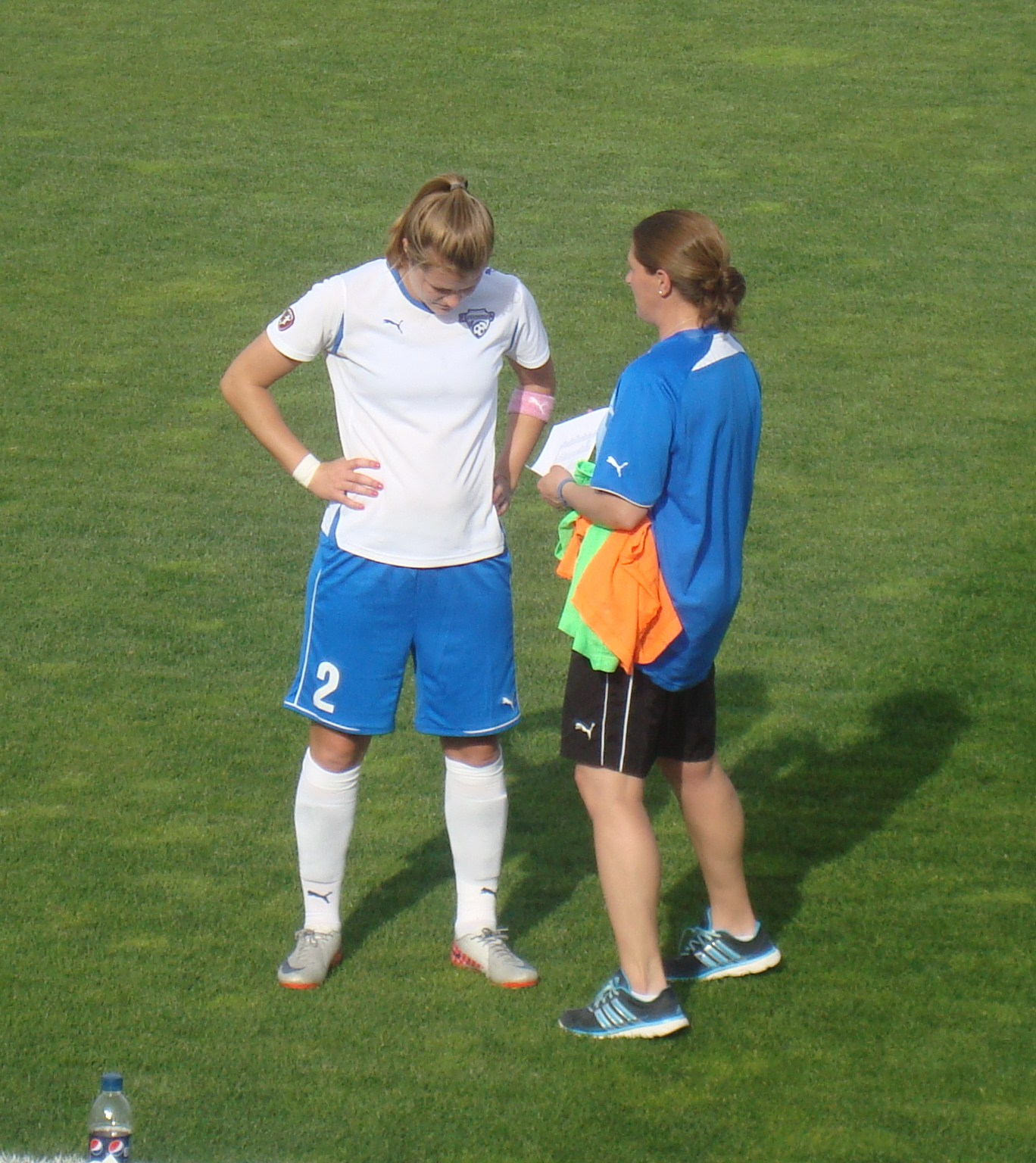
Cole (right) talking with Katie Schoepfer

Cole coached in both the Women's Professional Soccer (WPS) and the National Women's Soccer League (NWSL) women's professional leagues as an assistant and head coach. From 2008 to 2010, she served as the first assistant for the Boston Breakers (WPS) under head coach Tony DiCicco. She took over as head coach of the club prior to the collapse of WPS in 2012. In the interim years between WPS and NWSL, the Boston Breakers joined the Women's Premier Soccer League Elite (WPSL-E) and Cole coached the team to a first-place regular season title with an 11–3–0 record and the best season in franchise history. Cole was instrumental in the establishment of the NWSL and served as head coach for the Breakers in 2013, when they finished fifth during the regular season. After returning from international duties in Papua New Guinea in 2017, Cole joined the Houston Dash as an assistant coach to Vera Pauw. In June 2018, Cole then moved to the Washington Spirit as the professional team scout.

=== Semi-professional ===
Prior to the establishment of WPS, Cole served as first assistant for the SoccerPlus CT Reds in the Women's Premier Soccer League (WPSL) under Tony DiCicco. The Reds won the U23 National Championship in 2007 and in 2008 were the East-North Division Regular Season Champions.

=== Collegiate ===
Cole started her NCAA Division I Women's Soccer coaching career as an Assistant at the University of Mississippi in 1997. During her time there, the Ole Miss Rebels advanced to the 1999 Southeastern Conference Tournament Final and finished as SEC Western Division Regular Season Champions. From 2000 to 2003, Cole was an assistant at the University of Connecticut under Head Coach Len Tsantiris. In her tenure there, Cole coached the 2002 Big East goalkeeper of the year and helped the team to reach the NCAA Division I Women's Soccer Final (2002), Sweet 16, (2001), and Elite 8 (2002). The UConn Huskies were also Big East Tournament Champions in 2002. Cole's first role as head coach was for the University of Rhode Island from 2003 to 2005. During that time, she compiled an overall record of 32–24–7. She coached the team to the Atlantic 10 (A10) Tournament Semi-Final (2003) and Final (2004). In 2004, her team won the NSCAA Team Merit Award and she coached the A10 Rookie of the Year, a First-Team NSCAA/Adidas Academic All-Region Player, and an ESPN Academic All-American. Cole's most recent collegiate coaching role was as a volunteer assistant from 2005 to 2006 at Florida State University under head coach Mark Krikorian and alongside Erica Walsh Dambach, the current head coach for Penn State women's soccer). While at Florida State, the women's soccer team competed in the Atlantic Coast Conference (ACC) Playoffs and made the NCAA Division I Women's Soccer Final Four.

=== Youth ===
Cole has extensive youth coaching experience. In addition to her current role with the Washington Spirit Girls DA Program, Cole is the Technical Director for Centre Soccer Association, a non-profit community soccer organization in State College, PA. She has been a member of the Region I Olympic Development Program (ODP) staff since 2002, and has served as a member of both the Connecticut Junior Soccer Association and Rhode Island Youth Soccer Association Coaching Education Staff. Throughout her career she has worked with the Washington, Mississippi, Rhode Island and Connecticut state ODP programs and has served as a coach on multiple ODP Foreign Tour including those to Germany (2006, 2007), Brazil (2006, 2007), and England (2002). In 2006, Cole also spent time volunteering in Brazil with Cross-Cultural Solutions working in orphanages and teaching soccer (futbol) in schools.

== Sports administration ==
Cole was the director for the SoccerPlus Education Center from 2006–2008, a non-profit organization that provides and participates in educational programs, seminars, community outreach events and individual mentoring on and off the soccer field. She has been a member of United Soccer Coaches (formerly the National Soccer Coaches Association of America) for over 20 years and is very active within the organization. She has served on the Board of Directors, as chair of the NSCAA Women's Committee (now named the Women's Membership Group), and as the Advocacy Council Chair. She is also a member of the United Soccer Coaches Coaching Academy and primarily instructs advanced goalkeeping courses.

== Coaching licenses and diplomas ==
| Year | Course |
|---|---|
| 2014 | The FA International Course – License Award |
| 2004 | NSCAA Premier – with Distinction |
| 2003 | NSCAA Advance National Diploma – with Distinction |
| 2001 | USSF "A" Coaching License |
| 1998 | USSF "B" Coaching License |
| 1994 | USSF "C" Coaching License |
| 1992 | WSYSA "D" Coaching License |
| 1990 | WSYSA "E" Coaching License |

== See also ==
- Boston Breakers
- Women's soccer
