= John Cigna =

American radio personality (1935-2011)

- Born: Carmine John Cigna; December 11, 1935; Brooklyn, New York
- Died: May 20, 2011 (aged 75); Pittsburgh, Pennsylvania, US
- Occupations: Radio host, DJ, Media Personality

Carmine John Cigna (December 11, 1935 – May 20, 2011) was an American radio personality. He spent 28 years at KDKA in Pittsburgh, Pennsylvania, starting in 1973 until his retirement in 2001.

== Biography ==
=== Early years and career ===
Cigna was born in 1935 in Brooklyn, New York. He attended the Cambridge School of Broadcasting and Brooklyn College and worked at radio stations in West Virginia, Ohio, Indiana and Virginia before moving to Pittsburgh in 1969 to take up a position at WJAS as the sports anchor and morning news director. Liking the city, Cigna ended up finishing his career in Pittsburgh.

=== KDKA career ===
Cigna moved to KDKA in Pittsburgh on March 11, 1973, when he hosted a talk show from 9:00 PM to midnight. Cigna became known for his often brash and confrontational demeanor, unafraid to call unreasonable listeners 'stupid' when provoked. He also became known for his famous catchphrases, including 'babycakes', 'piece of cake', 'I don't believe this', and 'Oh, brother!'.

Cigna's late night tenure lasted until 1983, where he moved to the morning slot after previous morning host Jack Bogut moved to WTAE. The show, dubbed "John Cigna and the K-Team" consisted of Dave James, Fred Honsberger and sportscaster Nellie King.

Management, fearing a ratings dip after Bogut's departure, embarked on a heavy advertising campaign to promote Cigna on co-owned KDKA-TV, where Cigna appeared in a number of self-deprecating promos that usually began with "John Cigna is learning firsthand about...", and depending on the ad, it would be KDKA news, the KDKA Storm Center, and the KDKA Traffic Copter, among others. Cigna also became noted for performing two stunts in the KDKA news promo, where he jumped onto the hood of a moving station vehicle, and having a door slammed into his face (accidentally) by then-News Director Honsberger. Though KDKA was long-established as the top-rated station in Pittsburgh, ratings remained fairly steady after Cigna's move to mornings.

Cigna was paired with Honsberger in 1996 to do the morning show, now dubbed The Morning News with John Cigna, but Honsberger was moved back to his afternoon slot 6 months later. On his 25th anniversary at KDKA on March 11, 1998, Cigna received a congratulatory letter from president Bill Clinton, citations from the state and county government, and the proclamation of "John Cigna Day" in Pittsburgh.

Upon his retirement in September 2001, Cigna's on-air absences had been getting more frequent, to the point where billboards promoted "Where's Cigna?". Cigna's health began to decline since suffering injuries in a motorcycle crash two years prior. He was succeeded by Larry Richert as host of the morning show.

=== Personal life and death ===
Cigna was married to Patricia, and had four sons, Tony, John, Mike, and Chris. Cigna was also an avid motorcyclist, often taking motorcycle trips on his Harley Davidson during his retirement. He had been injured in a motorcycle accident in March 1999.

Cigna died on May 20, 2011, in the Pittsburgh suburb of McCandless, Pennsylvania. He had experienced failing health and had recently experienced suffered a stroke and effects of emphysema. His wife, Pat, of 53 years had predeceased him by four months, dying in January. Upon his death, Michael Young, senior vice president and Pittsburgh market manager for CBS Radio, stated "Pittsburgh lost an icon. He was just full of life." Cigna had requested that his motorcycle be displayed next to his casket during his funeral. His motorcycle was donated to the Heinz History museum where it is currently on display along with a small exhibit to commemorate this local legend.
