= Pope John XXIII High School (Everett, Massachusetts) =

Private coeducational school in Everett, Massachusetts, United States

- Papa Ioannes XXIII High School

Location
- 888 Broadway; Everett Massachusetts; Everett, (Middlesex County), Massachusetts 02149; United States; 42°25′13″N 71°2′42″W

Information
- Type: Private, Coeducational
- Motto: In necessariis unitas, in nonessentials libertas in omnibus caritas (In essentials unity, in nonessentials liberty, in all things charity)
- Religious affiliation: Roman Catholic
- Patron saints: Saint John XXIII, Saint Joseph
- Established: 1965
- Founder: Richard Cardinal Cushing
- Closed: 2019
- Oversight: Archdiocese of Boston
- Superintendent: Katy Mears
- CEEB code: 220 765
- Principal: Thomas J Mahoney
- Head of school: Carl DiMaiti
- Teaching staff: 30
- Grades: 8–12
- Student to teacher ratio: 15:1
- Campus: Urban
- Colors: Blue and Gold
- Slogan: Unlock Your Future
- Song: Pope John High Will Reign Supreme
- Athletics: Varsity/ Junior Varsity/ Club
- Athletics conference: Catholic Central League
- Sports: Football, Soccer (Boys & Girls), Basketball (Boys & Girls), Volleyball (Boys & Girls), Girls' Tennis, Softball, Baseball, Boys LAX Cheerleading.
- Team name: Tigers
- Accreditation: New England Association of Schools and Colleges
- Newspaper: The Mercury
- Tuition: Domestic: $9500; International Home Stay $16,500
- Communities served: Everett, Malden, Melrose, Saugus, Lynn, Revere, Boston, Chelsea, Somerville, Medford, China, Korea, Angola, Brazil, Vietnam, Italy, Spain, Canada
- Feeder schools: Cheverus School (Malden); Sacred Heart (Lynn); Saint Rose (Chelsea)
- Affiliation: NEASC
- Website: popejohnhs.org

Pope John XXIII High School was a private, Roman Catholic high school in Everett, Massachusetts In United States, in the Roman Catholic Archdiocese of Boston. The school was established in 1965. It was an independent, coeducational, Catholic college preparatory school serving the metro Boston area. In 2016, Roncalli Prep, recognizing Pope John XXIII's name before taking John as his name ( Grade 8 ) was added to the student body.

The school was closed on May 31, 2019 after United Schools Association, which hosted international students in its dormitory program, failed to make payments to the school.

== Academics ==
The curriculum at Pope John XXIII High School provides multiple pathways of academic function - College Preparatory, Honors and Advanced Placement.

== Performing arts ==
Students produce drama, musicals, talent shows, and summer productions. Recent shows include Godspell, A Christmas Carol, Guys and Dolls, and Hello, Dolly!. Visits are made to shows at Boston theatres; the Drama Club saw the production of War Horse at the Boston Opera House.

In the fall of 2016, students performed a rendition "The Election."

== Sports ==
Sports teams include:

- Cheerleading
- Football
- Boys' Soccer
- Girls' Soccer
- Boys' Volleyball
- Girls' Volleyball
- Boys' Basketball
- Girls' Basketball
- Baseball
- Softball
- Girls' Tennis
- Boys Lacrosse

In 2016 the Pope John Tigers won the Catholic Central Small League after defeating second place, Matignon (Cambridge) 93–70 in Matignon's gym. The Tigers would go on to the MIAA Division 4 North Final, and there The Tigers would fall to St Mary's (Lynn) 68-49 (who would go on to win the Division 4 State Championship a week later) after defeating St Clement (Medford) in the Division 4 North Quarter Finals, 52–49 at Pope John and defeating defending state champion Hamilton-Wenham 50–38 in the Division 4 North Semi-Finals at Wilmington High School. The Tigers finished the 2016 season with a 20–3 record. In 2018, the Tigers, on the strength of a 49-point performance by Angel Price Espada, would win the school's first State Championship in basketball. Pope John defeated the defending State Champion Maynard HS 89–57 at Springfield College. Seniors Mike Thompson, Marquis Bouyer and Juniors Mekhi Collins, and Luis Velasquez started the game for the Tigers. The 2018 Pope John Football team went undefeated in the Catholic Central (Small) League winning that championship. In the MIAA playoffs, Pope John won the Eastern Massachusetts Championship before falling to Saint Bernard Catholic High School in the Super Bowl played at Gillette Stadium.

== Clubs and organizations ==
- Adventure Club
- Ambassador Club
- Campus Ministry
- Chess Club
- Culinary Club
- Drama Club/Theatre Arts Program
- Girls Who Code
- Math Club
- Mock Trial
- National Honor Society
- Poetry Club
- Running Club
- School Newspaper: The Mercury
- School Yearbook Club
- Special Effects Club
- Student Government
- World Travel Club

Student life

Extracurricular activities include campus ministry, drama and Theatre Arts, the school newspaper The Mercury, the chess club, and student government.
