= Marian High School (Massachusetts) =

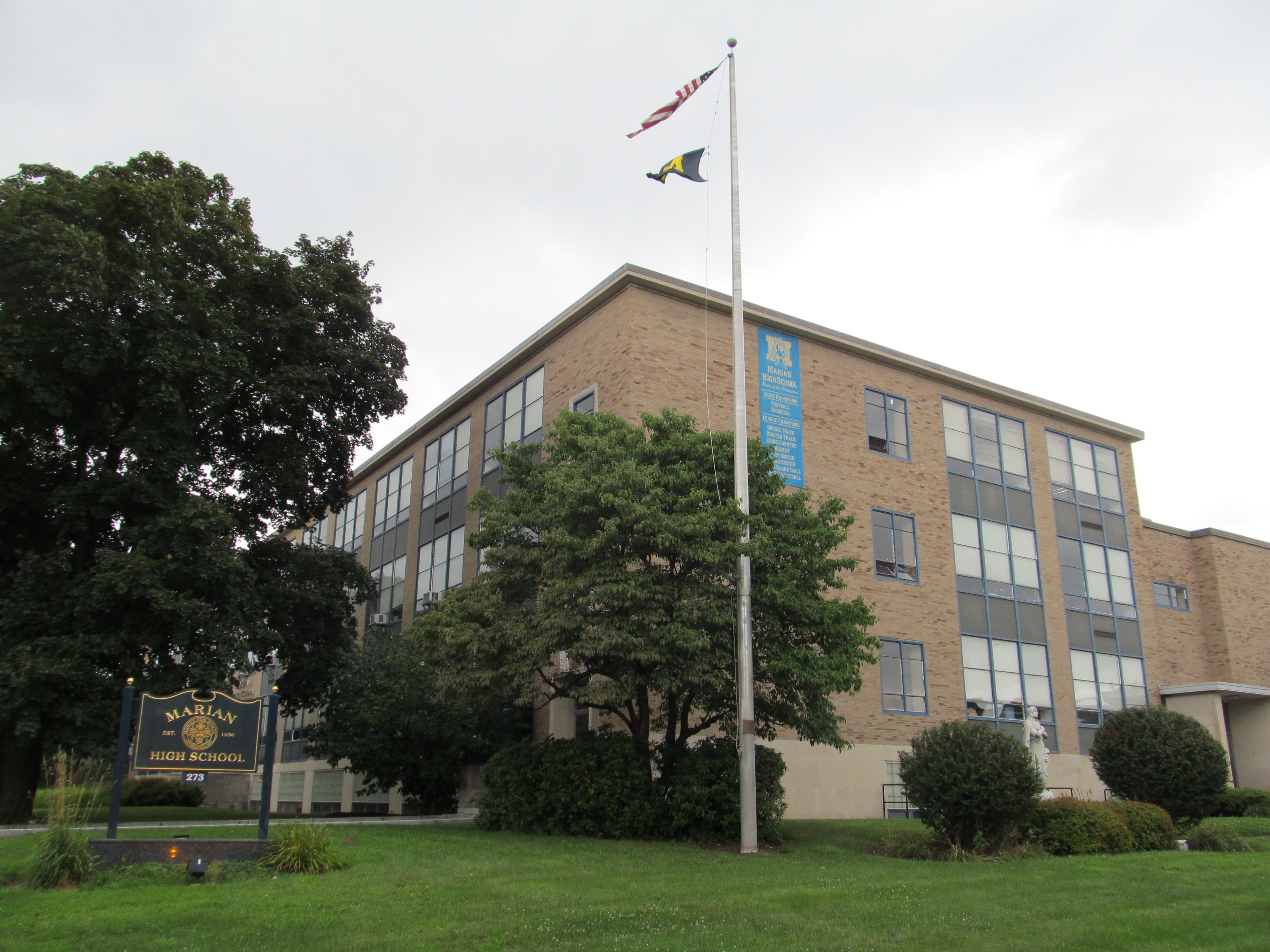

Location
- 273 Union Avenue; Framingham, Massachusetts 01702; United States
- Coordinates: 42°17′10″N 71°25′19″W

Information
- Type: Private high school
- Religious affiliation: Roman Catholic
- Established: 1956
- Closed: 2018
- Oversight: Roman Catholic Archdiocese of Boston
- NCES School ID: 00599679
- President: John Ermilio
- Principal: Brian Donohue
- Teaching staff: 27.1 (on an FTE basis)
- Grades: 9–12
- Gender: Co-educational
- Enrollment: 254 (2015-2016)
- Student to teacher ratio: 9.4
- Colors: Blue and gold
- Athletics conference: Catholic Central League
- Mascot: Mustang
- Nickname: Mustangs
- Accreditation: New England Association of Schools and Colleges
- Website: www.marianhigh.org

Marian High School was a private, Roman Catholic, co-educational high school in Framingham, Massachusetts, United States. It was established in 1956 and was located in the Roman Catholic Archdiocese of Boston. It ran independently of the Diocese since 2004 and on April 3, 2018, the school's board voted unanimously to cease operations at the end of the 2018 school year, due to low enrollment.

== Notable alumni ==
- Peter Cronan, NFL player and color commentator
- Lida E. Harkins, politician
- Steven J. McAuliffe, judge
- Christa McAuliffe, teacher and astronaut
- Jay Miller, NHL player
- Brian Moran, politician
- Jim Moran, politician
- Dave Schuler, MLB player
- Fred Willis, former NFL player
- Walter Cho, businessman
