= Saint Clement School (Massachusetts) =

Saint Clement High School
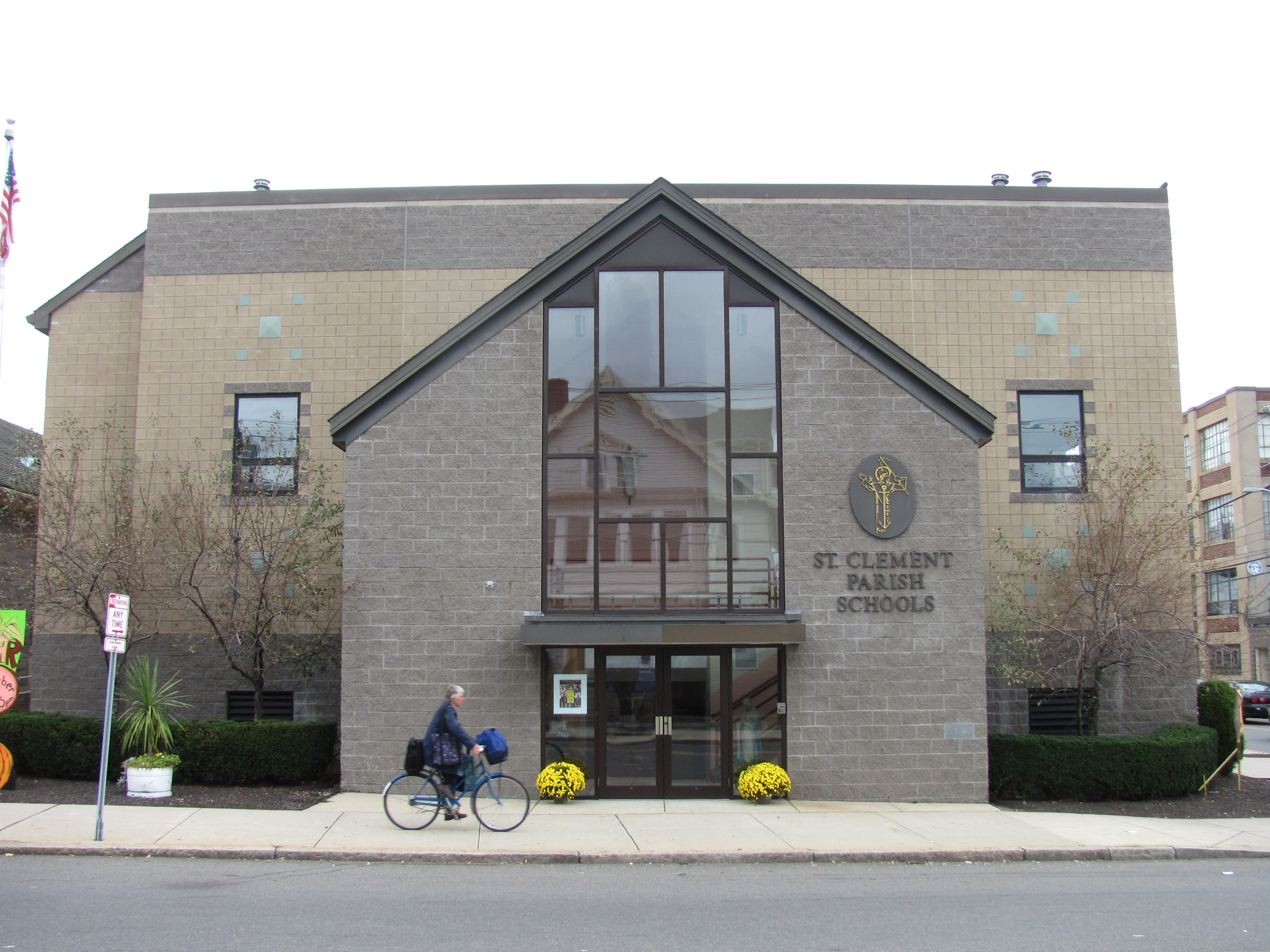
- Saint Clement High School

Location
- 579 Boston Avenue; Medford, (Middlesex County), Massachusetts 02155; United States; 42°24′11″N 71°6′51″W

Information
- Type: Private, Coeducational
- Motto: Non Sibi Sed Omnibus. (Not for Oneself Alone, But For Others.)
- Religious affiliations: Roman Catholic, Sisters of St. Joseph
- Established: 1925
- Principal: Robert Chevrier
- Head of school: Franco Soma
- Faculty: 23
- Grades: 6–12
- Colors: Maroon and Gold
- Athletics conference: Catholic Central League
- Team name: Anchormen and Lady Anchors
- Accreditation: New England Association of Schools and Colleges
- Athletic Director: Ryan Murphy
- Website: saintclementschool.org

Saint Clement School, also Saint Clement Junior-Senior High School, was a private, Roman Catholic secondary school in Medford, Massachusetts. It was located in the Roman Catholic Archdiocese of Boston.

== Background ==
Saint Clement High School was established in 1925 by the Sisters of St. Joseph.

In 1984, the Anchormen advanced all the way to the MA State Eastern Mass Division 5 Super Bowl Championship; winning over Blue Hills (22 - 6) at BU Nickerson Field.

In 2013, the Football team won the Catholic Central Small championship for the second time and advanced all the way to the State Semi-Finals in the state playoffs, where they lost 40-20 to Cohasset for the right to advance to the state championship. St. Clement finished the season with a 9-3 record.

In its final years it had preschool to kindergarten as well as 6-12. In the 2012-2013 school year it had 256 students in all grade levels, but this declined to 147 in the 2016-2017 school year. In 2017, it was announced the school was to shut down on June 9 of that year, citing low enrollment.

== Notable alumni ==
- Larnel Coleman (Class of 2016), football player
