= Savio Preparatory High School =

St. Dominic Savio Preparatory High School
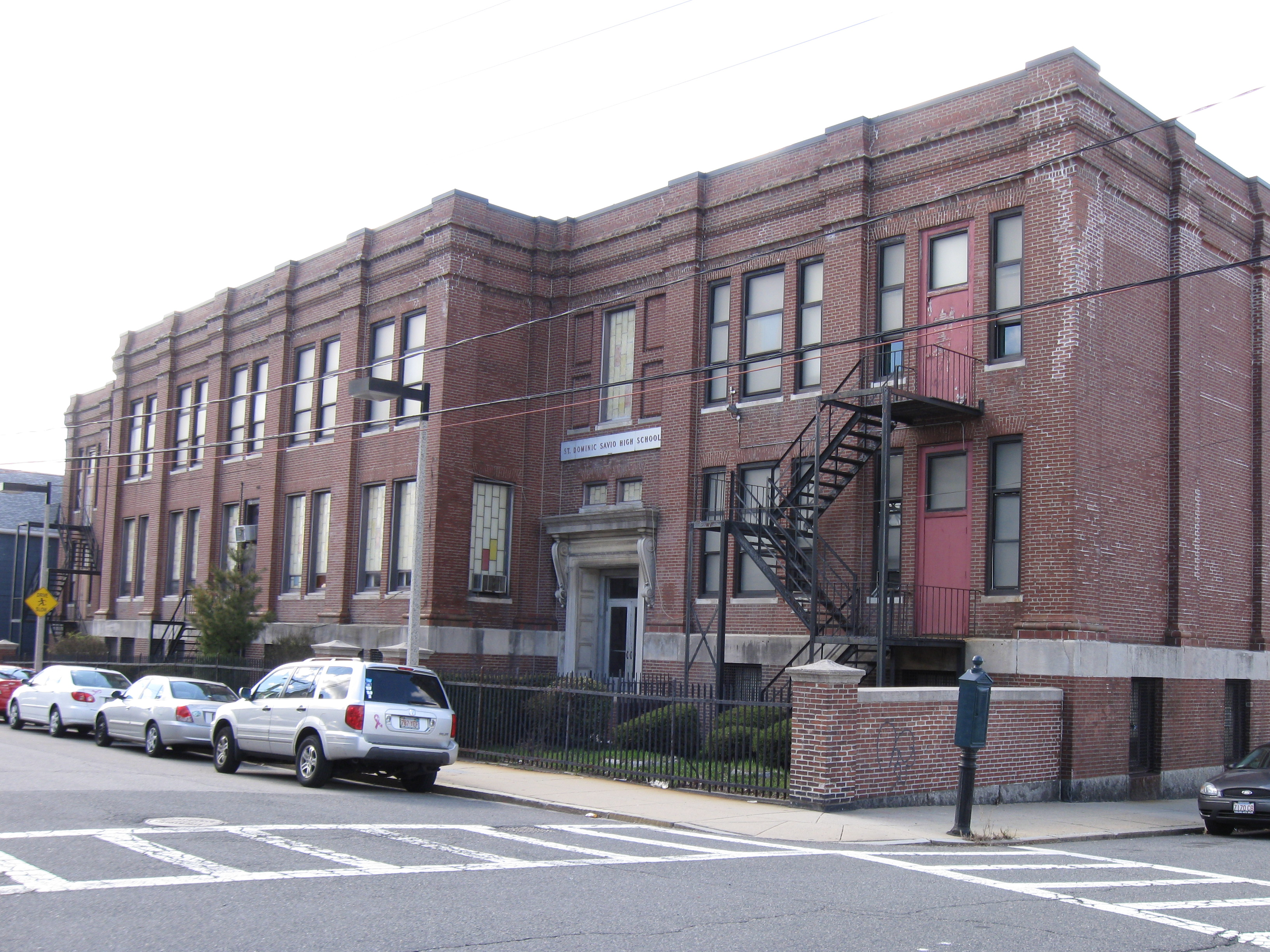

Location
- 145 Byron Street; East Boston, Massachusetts 02128; United States

Information
- School type: High school
- Motto: Potius Mori Quam Foedari (Death before Dishonor)
- Religious affiliations: Roman Catholic, Salesians of Don Bosco
- Patron saint: St. Dominic Savio
- Established: 1958
- Founder: Fr. Joseph Caselli, S.D.B.
- Status: Defunct
- Closed: 2007
- School district: Archdiocese of Boston
- Principal: Anders Peterson (2007)
- Grades: 9–12
- Gender: Male only (1958–1993), coeducational (1993–2007)
- Student to teacher ratio: 1:14 (2001)
- Campus type: Urban
- Colors: Red and White followed by Maroon and gold
- Sports: Football, Baseball, Cross Country, Basketball, Hockey, Track
- Nickname: Dom Savio
- Team name: Spartans
- Newspaper: The Spartan Forum
- Yearbook: The Spartan
- Website: http://www.savioprep.org/

St. Dominic Savio Preparatory High School, formerly St. Dominic Savio High School, was a Roman Catholic high school located in the East Boston neighborhood of Boston, Massachusetts. The school was founded in 1958 and closed in 2007.

== History ==
The school was founded as an all-boys school in 1958 by the Salesians of Don Bosco, a Catholic religious order. Alumnus Paul Abbott recalled a day when the student body voted on whether the school should add football or hockey as a new sport:

It was 1970, the Bobby Orr era in Boston, so we chose hockey.

In 1993, the Salesians of Don Bosco closed Savio, but an alumni group led by Peter J. Bagley redesigned an education strategy, convert to a coeducational preparatory school and leased a portion of the property.

=== New direction ===
From 1995 to 2005, Savio Prep's enrollment grew to over 400 co-ed students. In 2003, a former athletic director pleaded guilty to molesting three female athletes, and in 2006 a former wrestling coach pleaded guilty to raping two students and hazing three others. Enrollment declined and finances became tight.

=== School closed ===
At the end of the 2006–2007 school year, the Salesian owners of the building did not renew the lease, citing the deteriorating condition of the building and lack of funds to repair it. Concerned parents and alumni began meeting to discuss ways to keep the school open. The group called themselves "Save Our Savio," but could never muster enough funding or support to find the school a new location. It was clear that 2006–2007 had been the last St. Dominic Savio school year.

The building now houses the Edward W. Brooke Charter School. An addition has been built on the site of the former Salesian residence.

== Demographics ==
Year	Enrollment	Religious Employees	Lay Employees	Total Employees
1970s–1980s	440	9	n/a	n/a
2000	381	4	39	43
2001	400	4	45	49
2002	392	n/a	n/a	n/a
2003	n/a	3	n/a	n/a
2004	n/a	1	n/a	n/a
2007	165	1	n/a	n/a

== Heads of school ==
Director	Years	Headmaster/Principal	Years				
Fr. Joseph Caselli, S.D.B.	1958–?	unknown	1958–74				
unknown	?–1969	unknown	1958–74				
Fr. Albert Sofia, S.D.B.	1969–72	unknown	1958–74				
Fr. Albert Sofia, S.D.B.	1971–73	Fr. Joseph Santa Bibiana, S.D.B.	1971–73				
unknown	1974	Fr. Donald Zarkoski, S.D.B.	1974–81				
Fr. Earl R. Bissonnette, S.D.B.	1975-1980	Fr. Donald Zarkoski, S.D.B.	1974–81				
Fr. Jonathan D. Parks, S.D.B	1981–98						
Fr. Jonathan D. Parks, S.D.B	1981–98	unknown	1993–2000				
Fr. Jonathan D. Parks, S.D.B	1981–98	unknown	1993–2000	Edward Minor	2000–01	William P. Sullivan	2000–01
Fr. Jonathan D. Parks, S.D.B	1981–98	unknown	1993–2000	unknown	2001–07	unknown	2001–06
Anders Peterson	2006–07			unknown	2001–07		

== Notable alumni ==
- Carlo Basile, member of the Massachusetts House of Representatives
- Eddie Palladino, Boston Celtics public address announcer
- Robert Travaglini, President of the Massachusetts Senate 2003–2007
- Ian Bremmer, political scientist
