= Trinity Catholic High School (Massachusetts) =

Location
- 575 Washington Street; Newton, (Middlesex County), Massachusetts 02458; United States; 42°21′18″N 71°11′52″W

Information
- Type: Private, Coeducational
- Motto: Where Our Tradition Meets Tomorrow
- Religious affiliation: Roman Catholic
- Established: 1894
- Closed: 2012
- President: John Sassani
- Principal: Scott Kmack
- Grades: 9–12
- Student to teacher ratio: 14:1
- Campus type: Suburban
- Colors: Navy Blue, Columbia Blue and Grey
- Athletics conference: Catholic Central League Small
- Sports: Football, Cheerleading, Volleyball, Golf, Soccer, Basketball, Baseball, Softball
- Mascot: Falcons
- Accreditation: New England Association of Schools and Colleges
- Tuition: $8,550
- Dean of academics: Jeff Becker
- Dean of students: Craig Genualdo
- Admissions director: Carrie Kotecki
- Athletic director: Craig Genualdo
- Guidance couselor/campus ministry: Melanie Piendak
- International student coordinator: Naomi Kim
- Website: trinitycatholic.com

Trinity Catholic High School was a Roman Catholic high school in Newton, Massachusetts. It was located in the Roman Catholic Archdiocese of Boston. The school was a co-educational and college preparatory school founded in 1894. The school shut down in 2012, at which point the building that housed its functions was taken over by Cambridge Education Group and established as CATS Academy, a private non-religious school, catering mostly to international students.

== Advisory program ==
The advisory program provided daily contact with a faculty member who offered academic advisement, college preparation tools, and formation for life choices.

== 115th anniversary celebration ==
In October 2009, the school celebrated its 115th anniversary with a fundraising event that highlighted the school's history, accomplishments, and current and former students. All of the proceeds went to the funding of scholarships for future students. The event featured many prominent community guests including the former mayor of Newton, David Cohen, the Newton Community Chorus, and the current Boston College head hockey coach, Jerry York, who gave a speech. Other speakers included current students and faculty.

== Extracurricular activities ==
Some of the activities that have been available to students are: • Academic Decathlon • Art/Literary Magazine • Baseball • Basketball • Big Brothers/Big Sisters • Book Club • Campus Ministry – Emmaus • Camden, NJ Service-Learning • Chess Club • Cheerleading • Choir • Debate Club • Dominican Republic Service-Learning (April Break) • Drama Club • Film Club • Football • Forensics Club • Game Club • Golf • Hockey • Multi-Cultural Club • National Honor Society • Performing Arts Club • Photography Club • Poetry Club • Publications/Yearbook • Recording Studio Club • SAT Prep Club • Student Government • Soccer • Softball • Track and Field • Ultimate Frisbee Club • Volleyball • Guitar Club • Media Studies (TC Talk) • Student Leadership Team

== Memberships and associations ==
- Member of Association of Independent Schools of New England (AISNE)
- Member of National Catholic Education Association (NCEA)
- Association for Supervision & Curriculum Development (ASCD)
- Accredited Member of the New England Association of Schools and Colleges (NEASC) (2003)
