= 2014 Portland Thorns FC season =

Portland Thorns FC
2014 season
- President: Merritt Paulson
- Head coach: Paul Riley
- Stadium: Providence Park; Portland, Oregon (Capacity: 20,438)
- National Women's Soccer League: 3rd
- NWSL Playoffs: Semifinals (eliminated by FC Kansas City)
- Top goalscorer: Jessica McDonald (11 goals)
- Highest home attendance: 19,123 (Aug. 3 vs. Houston Dash)
- Lowest home attendance: 9,672 (Jul 13 vs. FC Kansas City)
- Average home league attendance: 13,362
- Biggest win: 7-1 (Jul. 13 vs. FC Kansas City)
- Biggest defeat: 0-5 (June 7 vs. Western New York Flash)
Home colors	Away colors

The 2014 season was the Portland Thorns FC's second season of existence in the National Women's Soccer League, the top division of women's soccer in the United States.

== Club ==
=== Executive staff ===
Majority Owner, Chief Executive Officer	Merritt Paulson
President, Business Operations	Mike Golub
General Manager	Gavin Wilkinson
Ground (capacity and dimensions)	Jeld-Wen Field (20,438 / 110x70 yards)

Updated to match played October 6, 2014

=== Coaching staff ===
Position	Staff
Head Coach	Paul Riley
Assistant Coach	Mike Demakis
Assistant Coach	Skip Thorp
Assistant Coach	Scot Thompson
Goalkeeper Coach	Steve Reese
Athletic Trainer	Katie Donnelly

Last updated: October 6, 2014

=== Roster ===
Note: Flags indicate national team as defined under FIFA eligibility rules; some limited exceptions apply. Players may hold more than one non-FIFA nationality.

No.	Pos.	Nation	Player
1	GK	GER	Nadine Angerer
2	DF	USA	Rebecca Moros
4	DF	AUS	Stephanie Catley
6	MF	USA	Meleana Shim
7	DF	USA	Nikki Marshall
8	MF	USA	Angie Kerr
9	MF	ESP	Verónica Boquete
10	MF	USA	Allie Long
12	FW	CAN	Christine Sinclair
13	FW	USA	Alex Morgan
14	FW	USA	Jessica McDonald

No.	Pos.	Nation	Player
16	DF	USA	Rachel Van Hollebeke
17	MF	USA	Tobin Heath
18	GK	USA	Michelle Betos
19	MF	USA	Sarah Huffman
20	DF	USA	Kat Tarr
21	DF	USA	Emily Menges
22	MF	USA	Amber Brooks
23	FW	MEX	Jackie Acevedo
24	MF	USA	Sinead Farrelly
25	DF	USA	Courtney Niemiec
28	FW	SWE	Hanna Terry

== Match results ==
=== Key ===
Win Tie Loss

=== Pre-season ===
March 28, 2014	Arizona Wildcats	0–10	Portland Thorns FC	Tucson, Arizona
19:00 (PDT)		Report	Sinclair 3'; Kerr 6'; Van Hollebeke 33', 53'; McDonald 42', 48'; Long 55', 58'; Shim 68', 90'	Stadium: Kino Veterans Memorial Stadium; Attendance: 1,774; Referee: Ramy Touchan

March 30, 2014	Arizona State Sun Devils	0–5	Portland Thorns FC	Tucson, Arizona
19:00 (PDT)		Report	Long 3', 19'; Acevedo 45'; Sinclair 51'; Tarr (yellow card) 69'; McDonald 82'	Stadium: Kino Veterans Memorial Stadium; Attendance: 1,032; Referee: Matt Stewart

=== Regular season ===
April 12, 2014 1	Houston Dash	0 - 1	Portland Thorns FC	Houston, Texas
20:00 (PDT)	Masar (yellow card) 74'	Report	Long (yellow card) 15' (goal) 24'	Stadium: BBVA Compass Stadium; Attendance: 8,097; Referee: Christina Unkel

Apr 19, 2014 2	Sky Blue FC	1 - 1	Portland Thorns FC	Piscataway, New Jersey
19:00 (PDT)	Rampone 25'	Report	Marshall (yellow card) 73'; Long 75' (pen.)	Stadium: Yurcak Field; Attendance: 2,983; Referee: Mark Allatin

Apr 26, 2014 3	Portland Thorns FC	3 - 1	FC Kansas City	Portland, Oregon
22:00 (PDT)	Long 44' (pen.); McDonald 84', 88'	Report	Holiday 56' (pen.); Mathias (yellow card) 63'	Stadium: Providence Park; Attendance: 14,124; Referee: Farhad Dadkho

May 3, 2014 4	Western New York Flash	1 - 1	Portland Thorns FC	Rochester, New York
19:00 (PDT)	Bermudez 39'	Report	McDonald 43'	Stadium: Sahlen's Stadium; Attendance: 3,674; Referee: Matthew Franz

May 10, 2014 5	Portland Thorns FC	0 - 1	Seattle Reign FC	Portland, Oregon
19:00 (PDT)	Brooks (yellow card) 29'	Report	Little 89'	Stadium: Providence Park; Attendance: 14,182; Referee: Boris Senic

May 14, 2014 6	Houston Dash	0 - 1	Portland Thorns FC	Houston, Texas
20:00 (PDT)	Ohai (yellow card) 76'	Report	McDonald 57'; Brooks (yellow card) 90'	Stadium: BBVA Compass Stadium; Attendance: 3,931; Referee: Josh Wilkens

May 21, 2014 7	Portland Thorns FC	2 - 1	Western New York Flash	Portland, Oregon
22:00 (PDT)	Long 17'; McDonald 49'; Tarr (yellow card) 75'	Report	Bermudez (yellow card) 14'; Zerboni 57'; Reynolds (yellow card) 73'; Wambach (yellow card) 81'; Taylor (yellow card) 90'	Stadium: Providence Park; Attendance: 10,920; Referee: Mark Allatin

May 24, 2014 8	Portland Thorns FC	0 - 1	Sky Blue FC	Portland, Oregon
22:00 (PDT)		Report	O'Hara 84'	Stadium: Providence Park; Attendance: 13,427; Referee: Bernard Hosu

May 28, 2014 9	Boston Breakers	4 - 1	Portland Thorns FC	Boston, Massachusetts
19:30 (PDT)	Ezurike 2'; Reeves 25', 45', 59'; Jones (yellow card) 39'; Whitehill (yellow card) 64'; D’Agostino (yellow card) 73'	Report	Tarr (red card) 42'; Shim (yellow card) 58'; Sinclair 62'	Stadium: Harvard Stadium; Attendance: 1,556; Referee: Boris Senic

Jun 7, 2014 10	Portland Thorns FC	0 - 5	Western New York Flash	Portland, Oregon
22:00 (PDT)	Marshall (yellow card) 23'; Angerer (red card) 28'; Menges (yellow card) 31'	Report	Taylor (yellow card) 5'; Zerboni 11'; Lloyd 28' (pen.), 51'; Kerr 32', 47'	Stadium: Providence Park; Attendance: 13,838; Referee: Juliana Duncan

Jun 15, 2014 11	Portland Thorns FC	2 - 0	Washington Spirit	Portland, Oregon
17:00 (PDT)	McDonald 11'; Boquete 78'	Report	Angeli (yellow card) 45+2' (yellow-red card) 86'	Stadium: Providence Park; Attendance: 10,056; Referee: Michael Zapata

Jun 21, 2014 12	Washington Spirit	1 - 6	Portland Thorns FC	Boyds, Maryland
18:30 (PDT)	Gayle (yellow card) 10'; Nairn 62'	Report	Sinclair 5'; Morgan 10', 71'; Brooks (yellow card) 59'; McDonald 85', 87'; Menges (yellow card) 89'; Long 90+1'	Stadium: Maureen Hendricks Field Maryland SoccerPlex; Attendance: 3,806; Referee: Kristen Salazar

Jun 25, 2014 13	Portland Thorns FC	1 - 2	Sky Blue FC	Portland, Oregon
22:00 (PDT)	Sinclair 54'; Van Hollebeke (yellow card) 76'	Report	Freels 8' (yellow card) 75'; Foord (yellow card) 46'; Cutshall 65'	Stadium: Providence Park; Attendance: 10,477; Referee: Bernard Hosu

Jun 28, 2014 14	FC Kansas City	1 - 0	Portland Thorns FC	Kansas City, Missouri
20:00 (PDT)	Holiday 41'	Report	Brooks (yellow card) 50'	Stadium: Durwood Soccer Stadium; Attendance: 2,421; Referee: Josh Wilkens

Jul 4, 2014 15	Portland Thorns FC	2 - 2	Chicago Red Stars	Portland, Oregon
14:00 (PDT)	McDonald 24'; Huffman 39' (yellow card) 62'	Report	Press 76', 82'	Stadium: Providence Park; Attendance: 13,084; Referee: Timon Berry

Jul 9, 2014 16	Chicago Red Stars	1 - 1	Portland Thorns FC	Lisle, Illinois
20:00 (PDT)	Van Egmond 86' (pen.)	Report	Long 27' (pen.); Huffman (yellow card) 88'	Stadium: Benedictine U. Sports Complex Stadium; Referee: Boris Senic

Jul 13, 2014 17	Portland Thorns FC	7 - 1	FC Kansas City	Portland, Oregon
19:00 (PDT)	Boquete 3', 74' (pen.); Morgan 15'; Long 43', 62'; Heath (yellow card) 70'; Sinclair 80'; Brooks 88'	Report	Gorry 30'; Richmond (yellow card) 40'; LePeilbet (yellow card) 42'; Buczkowski (yellow card) 87'	Stadium: Providence Park; Attendance: 9,672; Referee: Christina Unkel

Jul 17, 2014 18	Chicago Red Stars	1 - 1	Portland Thorns FC	Lisle, Illinois
20:00 (PDT)	Boxx (yellow card) 57'; Chalupny 77'	Report	McDonald 1'; Sinclair (yellow card) 57'; Menges (yellow card) 90+1'	Stadium: Benedictine U. Sports Complex Stadium; Attendance: 2,014; Referee: Josh Wilkens

Jul 20, 2014 19	Portland Thorns FC	6 - 3	Boston Breakers	Portland, Oregon
17:00 (PDT)	Long 21' (pen.); Sinclair 35', 42', 46'; Morgan 52'; McDonald 88'	Report	Schoepfer 14'; Washington 32'; O’Reilly 39' (pen.)	Stadium: Providence Park; Attendance: 14,383; Referee: Margaret Domka

Jul 23, 2014 20	Washington Spirit	1 - 1	Portland Thorns FC	Boyds, Maryland
19:00 (PDT)	Taylor 68'	Report	Morgan 8'	Stadium: Maureen Hendricks Field Maryland SoccerPlex; Attendance: 3,854; Referee: Katja Koroleva

Jul 27, 2014 21	Seattle Reign FC	5 - 0	Portland Thorns FC	Seattle, Washington
19:00 (PDT)	Leroux 4'; Winters (yellow card) 10'; Kawasumi 40', 49'; Rapinoe 57'; Little 90+3'	Report		Stadium: Memorial Stadium; Attendance: 5,597; Referee: Boris Senic

Aug 3, 2014 22	Portland Thorns FC	1 - 0	Houston Dash	Portland, Oregon
22:00 (PDT)	Boquette 54'; Marshall (yellow card) 90'	Report	Edwards (yellow card) 45'	Stadium: Providence Park; Attendance: 19,123; Referee: Katja Koroleva

Aug 10, 2014 23	Boston Breakers	2 - 0	Portland Thorns FC	Boston, Massachusetts
18:30 (PDT)	Wood 14'; O’Reilly 28'; King (yellow card) 53'	Report	Sinclair (yellow card) 29'	Stadium: Harvard Stadium; Referee: Timon Berry

Aug 17, 2014 24	Portland Thorns FC	1 - 0	Seattle Reign FC	Portland, Oregon
17:00 (PDT)	Morgan 68'	Report	Deines (yellow card) 50'; Rapinoe (yellow card) 89'	Stadium: Providence Park; Attendance: 17,109; Referee: Elvis Mahmutovic

==== Standings ====
Pos	Team	Pld	W	D	L	GF	GA	GD	Pts	Qualification
1	Seattle Reign FC	24	16	6	2	50	20	+30	54	NWSL Shield
2	FC Kansas City (C)	24	12	5	7	39	32	+7	41	NWSL Playoffs
3	Portland Thorns FC	24	10	6	8	39	35	+4	36	NWSL Playoffs
4	Washington Spirit	24	10	5	9	36	43	−7	35	NWSL Playoffs
5	Chicago Red Stars	24	9	8	7	32	26	+6	35	
6	Sky Blue FC	24	9	7	8	30	37	−7	34	
7	Western New York Flash	24	8	4	12	42	38	+4	28	
8	Boston Breakers	24	6	2	16	37	53	−16	20	
9	Houston Dash	24	5	3	16	23	44	−21	18	

Source: NWSL
Rules for classification: Tiebreakers
(C) Champions

==== Results summary ====
Overall								Home						Away					
Pld	Pts	W	L	T	GF	GA	GD	W	L	T	GF	GA	GD	W	L	T	GF	GA	GD
24	36	10	8	6	39	35	+4	7	4	1	25	17	+8	3	4	5	14	18	−4

Last updated: August 17, 2014
Source: National Women's Soccer League
Pld = Matches played; Pts = Points; W = Matches won; T = Matches tied; L = Matches lost; GF = Goals for; GA = Goals against; GD = Goal difference

==== Results by round ====
Round	1	2	3	4	5	6	7	8	9	10	11	12	13	14	15	16	17	18	19	20	21	22	23	24
Stadium	A	A	H	A	H	A	H	H	A	H	H	A	H	A	H	A	H	A	H	A	A	H	A	H
Result	W	D	W	D	L	W	W	L	L	L	W	W	L	L	D	D	W	D	W	D	L	W	L	W

Updated to match(es) played on August 17, 2014. Source: National Women's Soccer League
A = Away; H = Home; W = Win; D = Draw; L = Loss

=== NWSL Championship Playoffs ===
August 23, 2014 Semifinal	FC Kansas City	2–0	Portland Thorns FC	Kansas City, Missouri
12:00 (CDT)	Rodriguez 65'; Phillips (yellow card) 84'; Holiday 87'	Report	Menges (yellow card) 22'	Stadium: Durwood Soccer Stadium; Attendance: 2,997; Referee: Chris Spivey

== Squad statistics ==
Note: only regular season squad statistics displayed

Key to positions: FW - Forward, MF - Midfielder, DF - Defender, GK - Goalkeeper

N	Pos	Player	GP	GS	Min	G	A	WG	Shot	SOG	Cro	CK	Off	Foul	FS	YC	RC
23	FW	Jackie Acevedo	2	0	15	0	0	0	0	0	0	0	3	0	0	0	0
9	MF	Veronica Boquete	15	15	1335	4	6	1	31	12	2	16	1	8	17	0	0
22	MF	Amber Brooks	20	19	1598	1	2	0	21	7	2	10	1	25	9	4	0
4	DF	Stephanie Catley	14	13	1141	0	5	0	5	1	0	1	0	8	10	0	0
24	MF	Sinead Farrelly	17	16	1303	0	0	0	11	6	1	1	5	15	18	0	0
17	MF	Tobin Heath	5	5	401	0	0	0	13	7	0	1	1	8	6	1	0
19	MF	Sarah Huffman	22	9	962	1	1	0	6	2	3	3	0	9	7	2	0
8	MF	Angie Kerr	14	8	676	0	3	0	12	7	3	0	1	3	1	0	0
10	MF	Allie Long	22	20	1809	9	3	1	44	21	10	113	15	31	29	1	0
7	DF	Nikki Marshall	24	24	2072	0	0	0	6	1	0	0	0	16	13	3	0
14	FW	Jessica McDonald	24	13	1310	11	1	4	48	26	4	1	5	12	6	0	0
21	DF	Emily Menges	23	22	1972	0	0	0	1	0	0	0	1	8	4	3	0
13	FW	Alex Morgan	14	13	1135	6	4	3	56	36	0	1	16	5	12	0	0
2	MF	Rebecca Moros	18	13	1171	0	0	0	8	4	3	0	0	9	7	0	0
25	DF	Courtney Niemiec	11	10	824	0	0	0	2	0	5	0	1	5	6	0	0
6	MF	Meleana Shim	17	4	530	0	2	0	14	6	0	0	0	4	6	1	0
12	FW	Christine Sinclair	23	22	1987	7	1	1	77	40	1	2	12	11	16	2	0
11	FW	Elisabeth Sullivan	1	0	1	0	0	0	0	0	0	0	0	0	0	0	0
20	DF	Kat Tarr	6	5	405	0	0	0	4	1	2	0	1	14	1	1	1
28	FW	Hanna Terry	2	0	8	0	0	0	0	0	0	0	0	0	0	0	0
16	DF	Rachel Van Hollebeke	12	9	835	0	1	0	2	0	0	0	0	9	6	1	0

N	Pos	Goal keeper	GP	GS	Min	W	L	T	Shot	SOG	Sav	GA	GA/G	Pen	PKF	SO
1	GK	Nadine Angerer	22	22	1917	8	8	6	232	104	74	30	1.364	3	4	4
18	GK	Michelle Betos	3	2	243	2	0	0	34	14	9	5	1.667	1	1	1

== Transfers ==
=== Transfers in ===
Date	Player	Pos	Previous club	Notes	Ref
January 2, 2014	(United States) Amber Brooks	MF	(Germany) Bayern Munich	Drafted by Portland in the 2013 NWSL College Draft.	
January 3, 2014	(Mexico) Jackie Acevedo	FW	(United States) Houston Aces	Acquired via national team allocation.	
January 13, 2014	(Germany) Nadine Angerer	GK	(Australia) Brisbane Roar		
January 13, 2014	(United States) Sinead Farrelly	MF	(United States) FC Kansas City	Acquired via trade for a 2nd-round 2014 NWSL College Draft pick.	
January 17, 2014	(United States) Michelle Betos	GK	(United States) Boston Breakers	Acquired via trade for a 4th-round 2014 NWSL College Draft pick.	
January 17, 2014	(United States) Emily Menges	DF	(United States) Georgetown University	2014 NWSL College Draft pick.	
January 17, 2014	(United States) Meleana Shim	MF	(United States) Houston Dash	Acquired via trade for a 2nd-round 2014 NWSL College Draft pick and Nikki Washington.	
January 17, 2014	(United States) Elisabeth Sullivan	FW	(United States) Mississippi State University	2014 NWSL College Draft pick.	
February 17, 2014	(Australia) Stephanie Catley	DF	(Australia) Melbourne Victory		
April 7, 2014	(Spain) Verónica Boquete	MF	(United States) Western New York Flash	Acquired along with Sarah Huffman via trade for Courtney Wetzel, Kathryn Williamson, and a 1st-round 2015 NWSL College Draft pick.	
April 7, 2014	(United States) Sarah Huffman	MF	(United States) Western New York Flash	Acquired along with Verónica Boquete via trade for Courtney Wetzel, Kathryn Williamson, and a 1st-round 2015 NWSL College Draft pick.	
April 9, 2014	(United States) Courtney Niemiec	DF/MF	(United States) La Salle University		
April 9, 2014	(United States) Katarina Tarr	DF	(Germany) SGS Essen		
July 25, 2014	(United States) Hanna Terry	FW	(United States) Northeastern University	Signed after amateur appearance.	

=== Transfers out ===
Date	Player	Pos	Destination Club	Notes	Ref
January 10, 2014	(United States) Meleana Shim	MF	(United States) Houston Dash	Selected in the 2014 NWSL Expansion Draft.	
January 13, 2014	(Canada) Karina LeBlanc	GK	(United States) Chicago Red Stars	Traded for 2nd-round pick in the 2015 NWSL College Draft.	
January 17, 2014	(United States) Nikki Washington	MF	(United States) Houston Dash	Tradeed along with a 2nd-round 2014 NWSL College Draft pick to acquire Meleana Shim.	
January 17, 2014	(United States) Tiffany Weimer	FW	(United States) Washington Spirit	Traded for a 3rd-round 2014 NWSL College Draft pick.	
August 25, 2014	(Spain) Verónica Boquete	MF	(Germany) 1. FFC Frankfurt		
September 10, 2014	(United States) Angie Kerr	MF	None	Player waived.	
November 18, 2014	(United States) Sarah Huffman	DF	None	Player retired.	

== See also ==
- 2014 National Women's Soccer League season
