= 2017 North Carolina Courage season =

North Carolina Courage
2017 season
- Owner: Stephen Malik
- General manager: Curt Johnson
- Head coach: Paul Riley
- Stadium: Sahlen's Stadium at WakeMed Soccer Park; Cary, North Carolina (Capacity: 10,000)
- NWSL: 1st
- Playoffs: Runner-up
- Top goalscorer: Lynn Williams (9)
- Highest home attendance: 7,020 (September 30 vs. Orlando)
- Lowest home attendance: 2,383 (May 24 vs. Sky Blue FC)
- Average home league attendance: 4,389
Home colors	Away colors

The 2017 North Carolina Courage season was the team's first season as a professional women's soccer team. North Carolina Courage plays in the National Women's Soccer League, the top tier of women's soccer in the United States. The Courage finished the regular season atop the table, winning the NWSL Shield and earning a spot in the NWSL Playoffs. After defeating Chicago 1–0 in the semi-finals of the playoffs, it lost 0–1 to Portland in the final.

== Review ==
The team played its previous season as the Western New York Flash, which won the 2016 NWSL Championship. The owners of North Carolina FC purchased the Flash and moved them to Cary, North Carolina, in January 2017 to create the Courage franchise, and retained most of the Flash's roster and coaching staff.

== Team ==
=== First-team roster ===
As of August 13, 2017
Source: North Carolina Courage

Note: Flags indicate national team as defined under FIFA eligibility rules; some limited exceptions apply. Players may hold more than one non-FIFA nationality.

No.	Pos.	Nation	Player
0	GK	USA	Katelyn Rowland
1	GK	CAN	Sabrina D'Angelo
2	DF	NOR	Nora Holstad
3	FW	USA	Makenzy Doniak
4	DF	USA	Elizabeth Eddy
5	MF	USA	Sam Mewis
6	DF	NZL	Abby Erceg
7	MF	USA	McCall Zerboni
8	MF	IRL	Denise O'Sullivan
9	FW	USA	Lynn Williams
10	MF	BRA	Debinha

No.	Pos.	Nation	Player
11	DF	USA	Taylor Smith
12	FW	USA	Ashley Hatch
13	DF	USA	Abby Dahlkemper
14	FW	USA	Jessica McDonald
15	DF	USA	Jaelene Hinkle
16	FW	USA	Darian Jenkins
20	DF	JPN	Yuri Kawamura
22	DF	USA	Stephanie Ochs
23	FW	USA	Kristen Hamilton
25	DF	USA	Meredith Speck
26	MF	USA	Samantha Witteman

== Transactions ==
=== 2017 NWSL College Draft ===
Source: National Women's Soccer League

Round	Pick	Nat.	Player	Pos.	Notes	Previous Team
Round 1	2	(United States)	Ashley Hatch	FW		Brigham Young University
Round 1	7	(United States)	Darian Jenkins	DF		UCLA
Round 2	20	(United States)	Claire Wagner	DF		Clemson
Round 3	27	(United States)	Jaycie Johnson	FW		University of Nebraska

=== In ===
Date	Player	Positions played	Previous club	Fee/notes	Ref.
December 23, 2016	(Brazil) Rosana	MF	(United States) Houston Dash	Acquired while the franchise operated as the Western New York Flash.	
January 5, 2017	(Brazil) Debinha	MF	(China) Dalian Quanjian F.C.	Acquired while the franchise operated as the Western New York Flash.	
January 19, 2017	(United States) Samantha Witteman	MF	(United States) Orlando Pride	Acquired in a trade for Alanna Kennedy.	
April 4, 2017	(Japan) Yuri Kawamura	DF	(Japan) Albirex Niigata Ladies		
April 10, 2017	(United States) Ashley Hatch	FW	(United States) Brigham Young University	Signed college draft picks.	
April 10, 2017	(United States) Darian Jenkins	FW	(United States) University of California, Los Angeles	Signed college draft picks.	
June 16, 2017	(United States) Stephanie Ochs	DF	(United States) Houston Dash	Acquired off waivers.	
July 26, 2017	(Norway) Nora Holstad	DF	(Germany) FC Bayern Munich		
July 28, 2017	(Republic of Ireland) Denise O'Sullivan	MF	(United States) Houston Dash	Acquired off waivers.	

=== Out ===
Date	Player	Positions played	Destination club	Fee/notes	Ref.
January 19, 2017	(Australia) Alanna Kennedy	DF	(United States) Orlando Pride	Traded to acquire Samantha Witteman.	
May 27, 2017	(United States) Courtney Niemiec	DF		Retired.	
June 21, 2017	(Brazil) Rosana	MF		Waived.	

== Competitions ==
=== National Women's Soccer League ===
==== Preseason ====
Source: North Carolina FC

25 March 2017	North Carolina Courage	3–0	University of Tennessee	Charlotte, NC
5:30 p.m. ET	McDonald, Williams			Stadium: Queens Sports Complex

1 April 2017	North Carolina Courage	3–1	Wake Forest University	Cary, NC
1:00 p.m. ET	Debinha 60'; McDonald 67'; Rosana 85' (Hamilton)		26'	Stadium: WakeMed Soccer Park Field 3

5 April 2017	North Carolina Courage	1–0	Duke University	Cary, NC
7:30 p.m. ET	Eddy 59'			Stadium: WakeMed Soccer Park Field 3
Note: Kickoff postponed from 6:00 p.m. EST due to weather issues.

8 April 2017	North Carolina Courage	1–0	UNC-Chapel Hill	Cary, NC
6:00 p.m. ET	Odermann 84'			Stadium: WakeMed Soccer Park Field 14

==== Regular season ====
Source: National Women's Soccer League

15 April 2017 1	Washington Spirit	0–1	North Carolina Courage	Boyds, MD
3:00 p.m. ET	Mewis (yellow card) 28'; Zadorsky (yellow card) 82'		Zerboni 18' (Doniak) (yellow card) 70'	Stadium: Maryland SoccerPlex; Attendance: 2,407; Referee: Ekaterina Koroleva; Assistant referees: Sean Regan, Maggie Short; Fourth official: Karl Kummer

22 April 2017 2	North Carolina Courage	1–0	Portland Thorns FC	Cary, NC
7:30 p.m. ET	Kawamura (yellow card) 27'; Mewis (yellow card) 76'; Debinha 81' (McDonald)			Stadium: Sahlen's Stadium; Attendance: 6,298; Referee: Victor Rivas; Assistant referees: Adrienne McDonald, Amilcar Sicaju; Fourth official: Javier Rodriguez

29 April 2017 3	North Carolina Courage	3–1	Orlando Pride	Cary, NC
4:00 p.m. ET	McDonald 6'; Mewis (yellow card) 18', (goal) 33' (penalty); Williams 70' (Debinha); Zerboni (yellow card) 82'; Witteman (yellow card) 84'		Camila 27'; Alleway (yellow card) 33'	Stadium: Sahlen's Stadium; Attendance: 4,586; Referee: Farhad Dadkho; Assistant referees: Amanda Ross, Ryan Graves; Fourth official: Aaron Gallagher

7 May 2017 4	Boston Breakers	0–1	North Carolina Courage	Boston, MA
6:00 p.m. ET	King (yellow card) 35'; White (yellow card) 53'; Leon (yellow card) 81'		McDonald 32'; Smith (yellow card) 87'	Stadium: Jordan Field; Attendance: 2,276; Referee: Malik Badawi; Assistant referees: Trent Vainhaitsma, Matthew Osterhouse; Fourth official: Randall Kelley

14 May 2017 5	Orlando Pride	3–1	North Carolina Courage	Orlando, FL
5:00 p.m. ET	Ubogagu 49' (Krieger); Camila 50' (Fields); Spencer 82' (Marta); Krieger (yellow card) 88'; Pressley (yellow card) 90'		Zerboni (yellow card) 10'; Erceg (yellow card) 44', (yellow card) 57' (red card); Debinha 51' (Williams)	Stadium: Orlando City Stadium; Attendance: 5,260; Referee: Jon Freemon; Assistant referees: TJ Zablocki, Natlie Simon; Fourth official: Sammie Gillispie

21 May 2017 6	North Carolina Courage	1–3	Chicago Red Stars	Cary, NC
4:00 p.m. ET	Williams 55' (Hinkle)	(Note: "Chicago Defeats Front Runner North Carolina 3–1". chicagoredstars.com. Chicago Red Stars. May 21, 2017.)	Press 30' (penalty); Huerta 37' (Press); DiBernardo 45'; Short (yellow card) 75'; Ertz (yellow card) 90+4'	Stadium: Sahlen's Stadium; Attendance: 4,786; Referee: Rosendo Mendoza; Assistant referees: Jeremy Weed, Francisco Bermudez; Fourth official: John Collins

24 May 2017 7	North Carolina Courage	2–0	Sky Blue FC	Cary, NC
7:30 p.m. ET	Williams; Erceg (yellow card) 26'; Mewis 42'		Killion (yellow card) 47'; Stanton (yellow card) 59'	Stadium: Sahlen's Stadium; Attendance: 2,383; Referee: Kevin Broadley; Assistant referees: Benjamin Wooten, Gregory Brigman; Fourth official: Javier Rodriguez

27 May 2017 8	Chicago Red Stars	3–2	North Carolina Courage	Bridgeview, IL
3:00 p.m. CST	Colaprico 27' (DiBernardo), (yellow card) 39'; Mautz 54' (Press); DiBernardo 59'		Erceg 45+4' (Mewis); Debinha 82'	Stadium: Toyota Park; Attendance: 2,618; Referee: Becky Pagan; Assistant referees: Deleana Quon, Joshua Haimes; Fourth official: Rachel Smith

3 June 2017 9	North Carolina Courage	2–0	FC Kansas City	Cary, NC
3:30 p.m. ET	Hatch (yellow card) 13', (goal) 67' (Williams); Zerboni (yellow card) 57', (goal) 60' (Erceg)		Sauerbrunn (yellow card) 43'	Stadium: Sahlen's Stadium; Attendance: 3,717; Referee: Christina Unkel; Assistant referees: Alicia Messer, Maggie Short; Fourth official: Christopher Spivey

17 June 2017 10	North Carolina Courage	3–1	Boston Breakers	Cary, NC
7:30 p.m. ET	Hamilton 3' (Mewis), 13' (Zerboni); Hatch 38' (Doniak)		Leon 73' (Dowie); White (yellow card) 80'	Stadium: Sahlen's Stadium; Attendance: 3,780; Referee: Elvis Osmanovic; Assistant referees: Jeremy Weed, Justin Howard; Fourth official: Aaron Gallagher

24 June 2017 11	Boston Breakers	0–1	North Carolina Courage	Boston, MA
4:00 p.m. ET	Oyster (yellow card) 16'; Weimer (yellow card) 84'		Hatch 44' (Mewis)	Stadium: Jordan Field; Attendance: 3,209

1 July 2017 12	North Carolina Courage	0–1	Sky Blue FC	Cary, NC
3:30 p.m. ET	Witteman (yellow card) 80'	Report	Skroski (yellow card) 67'; Kerr 84' (Hayes)	Stadium: Sahlen's Stadium; Attendance: 3,056; Referee: Greg Dopka; Assistant referees: Cory Richardson, Trent Vanhaitsma; Fourth official: Javier Rodriguez
Note: Televised on Lifetime.

8 July 2017 13	North Carolina Courage	2–0	Seattle Reign FC	Cary, NC
9:45 p.m. ET	Hatch 33', (yellow card) 75'; Zerboni 80'	Report	McNabb (yellow card) 71'	Stadium: Sahlen's Stadium; Attendance: 3,565
Note: Kickoff was delayed from 7:30 p.m. Eastern due to severe weather.

15 July 2017 14	Portland Thorns FC	1–0	North Carolina Courage	Portland, OR
12:30 p.m. PST	Raso (yellow card) 62', (goal) 70' (Klingenberg)	Report	Smith (yellow card) 58'	Stadium: Providence Park; Attendance: 16,804
Note: Televised on Lifetime.

22 July 2017 15	FC Kansas City	postponed	North Carolina Courage	Kansas City, MO
7:00 p.m. CST				Stadium: Swope Soccer Village
Note: match postponed to 10 August due to weather

5 August 2017 16	North Carolina Courage	1–0	Seattle Reign FC	Cary, NC
7:30 p.m. ET	Williams 32'	Report	Stott (yellow card) 24'; Barnes (yellow card) 86'	Stadium: Sahlen's Stadium; Attendance: 5,249

10 August 2017 17	FC Kansas City	0–1	North Carolina Courage	Kansas City, MO
7:00 p.m. CST	LaBonta (yellow card) 45'	Report	Williams 86'	Stadium: Swope Soccer Village; Attendance: 1,398
Note: Match was originally scheduled to be played 22 July 2017 but was postponed due to weather

13 August 2017 18	Seattle Reign FC	1–2	North Carolina Courage	Seattle, WA
6:00 p.m. PST	Utsugi 40'	Report	Mewis 24', 74'	Stadium: Memorial Stadium; Attendance: 4,156

19 August 2017 19	North Carolina Courage	2–0	Washington Spirit	Cary, NC
3:30 p.m. ET	Hatch 46'; Kallman 84' (o.g.); Dahlkemper (yellow card) 90+2'	Report	Dydasco (yellow card) 55'	Stadium: Sahlen's Stadium; Attendance: 3,530
Note: To be televised on Lifetime.

27 August 2017 20	Houston Dash	postponed	North Carolina Courage	Houston, TX
7:00 p.m. CST		Report		Stadium: BBVA Compass Stadium
Note: match postponed to 27 September due to Hurricane Harvey

30 August 2017 21	Washington Spirit	2–3	North Carolina Courage	Boyds, MD
7:30 p.m. ET	Banini 8'; Farquharson (yellow card) 23'; Huster (yellow card) 45'; Williams 73'	Report	Mewis 45+1'; McDonald 61', 66'	Stadium: Maryland SoccerPlex; Attendance: 2,365

3 September 2017 22	Chicago Red Stars	2–1	North Carolina Courage	Bridgeview, IL
5:00 p.m. CST	Colaprico (yellow card) 40'; Nagasato 52'; Ertz (yellow card) 73' (goal) 84'	Report	Williams 15'; Zerboni (yellow card) 77'	Stadium: Toyota Park; Attendance: 3,745

9 September 2017 23	North Carolina Courage	1–0	Houston Dash	Cary, NC
7:30 p.m. ET	Hamilton 26'; Dahlkemper (yellow card) 63'	Report	Roccaro (yellow card) 64'; Van Wyk (yellow card) 90+7'	Stadium: Sahlen's Stadium; Attendance: 4,702

24 September 2017 24	Sky Blue FC	1–1	North Carolina Courage	Piscataway, NJ
6:00 p.m. ET	Stanton (yellow card) 65'; Rodriquez 75'	Report	Hatch 27'	Stadium: Yurcak Field; Attendance: 2,690

27 September 2017 25	Houston Dash	0–4	North Carolina Courage	Edinburg, TX
7:00 p.m. CST		Report	Mewis 13'; Williams 38'; Debinha 51'; Hatch 56'	Stadium: H-E-B Park; Referee: Michael Radchuck
Note: Match was originally scheduled to be played 27 August but was postponed due to Hurricane Harvey

30 September 2017 26	North Carolina Courage	2–3	Orlando Pride	Cary, NC
7:30 p.m. ET	Williams 62', 67' (pen.); Dahlkemper (yellow card) 90'	Report	Edmonds 22'; Marta 51' (yellow card) 72'; Harris (yellow card) 67'; Kennedy 90+1'	Stadium: Sahlen's Stadium; Attendance: 7,020

==== Postseason playoffs ====
8 October 2017 Semifinal	North Carolina Courage	1–0	Chicago Red Stars	Cary, NC
3:30 p.m. ET	O'Sullivan 89'	Report	Colaprico (yellow card) 36'	Stadium: Sahlen's Stadium; Attendance: 10,017
Note: Televised on Lifetime.

14 October 2017 Final	North Carolina Courage	0–1	Portland Thorns FC	Orlando, FL
4:30 p.m. ET		Report	Heath (yellow card) 41'; Raso (yellow card) 45+1'; Horan 50'; Brynjarsdóttir (yellow card) 72'	Stadium: Orlando City Stadium; Attendance: 8,124
Note: Televised on Lifetime.

==== League table ====
Pos	Team	Pld	W	D	L	GF	GA	GD	Pts	Qualification
1	North Carolina Courage	24	16	1	7	38	22	+16	49	NWSL Shield
2	Portland Thorns FC (C)	24	14	5	5	37	20	+17	47	NWSL Playoffs
3	Orlando Pride	24	11	7	6	45	31	+14	40	NWSL Playoffs
4	Chicago Red Stars	24	11	6	7	33	30	+3	39	NWSL Playoffs
5	Seattle Reign FC	24	9	7	8	43	37	+6	34	
6	Sky Blue FC	24	10	3	11	42	51	−9	33	
7	FC Kansas City	24	8	7	9	29	31	−2	31	
8	Houston Dash	24	7	3	14	23	39	−16	24	
9	Boston Breakers	24	4	7	13	24	35	−11	19	
10	Washington Spirit	24	5	4	15	30	48	−18	19	

Source: NWSL
Rules for classification: Tiebreakers
(C) Champions

==== Results summary ====
Overall								Home						Away					
Pld	W	D	L	GF	GA	GD	Pts	W	D	L	GF	GA	GD	W	D	L	GF	GA	GD
24	16	1	7	38	22	+16	49	9	0	3	20	9	+11	7	1	4	18	13	+5

Last updated: September 30, 2017.
Source: NWSLsoccer.com

==== Results by round ====
Round	1	2	3	4	5	6	7	8	9	10	11	12	13	14	15	16	17	18	19	20	21	22	23	24	25	26
Stadium	A	H	H	A	A	H	H	A	H	H	A	H	H	A	A	H	A	A	H	A	A	A	H	A	A	H
Result	W	W	W	W	L	L	W	L	W	W	W	L	W	L	P	W	W	W	W	P	W	L	W	D	W	L
Position	4	1	1	1	1	1	1	1	1	1	1	1	1	1	1	1	1	1	1	1	1	1	1	1	1	1

Updated to match(es) played on September 30, 2017. Source: NWSLsoccer.com
A = Away; H = Home; W = Win; D = Draw; L = Loss; P = Postponed

== Honors and awards ==
=== NWSL Team of the Month ===
Month	Goalkeeper	Defenders	Midfielders	Forwards	Ref.
April			(Brazil) Debinha (United States) Sam Mewis	(United States) Lynn Williams	
June		(United States) Abby Dahlkemper	(United States) Sam Mewis	(United States) Ashley Hatch	
July		(United States) Abby Dahlkemper (United States) Taylor Smith	(United States) McCall Zerboni		
August	(United States) Katelyn Rowland	(United States) Taylor Smith	(United States) Sam Mewis		

=== NWSL Player of the Week ===
Week	Result	Player	Ref.
16	Won	(United States) Sam Mewis	

=== NWSL Goal of the Week ===
Week	Result	Player	Ref.
1	Nominated	(United States) McCall Zerboni	
2	Nominated	(Brazil) Debinha	
3	Nominated	(United States) Lynn Williams	
6	Nominated	(United States) Lynn Williams	
7	Nominated	(Brazil) Debinha	
8	Nominated	(United States) Ashley Hatch	
9	Nominated	(United States) Ashley Hatch	
16	Nominated	(United States) Sam Mewis	

=== NWSL Save of the Week ===
Week	Result	Player	Ref.
3	Nominated	(Canada) Sabrina D'Angelo	

== Statistics ==
As of June 18, 2017
Source: National Women's Soccer League

N	Pos	Player	GP	GS	Min	G	A	PK	Shot	SOG	SOG%	CK	Off	Foul	YC	RC
1	GK	Sabrina D'Angelo	7	7	630	0	0	0	0	0	--	0	0	1	0	0
13	DF	Abby Dahlkemper	10	10	900	0	0	0	2	1	50.00%	65	0	1	0	0
10	MF	Débora Debinha	10	9	819	3	1	0	22	13	59.09%	4	0	9	0	0
3	FW	Makenzy Doniak	10	9	657	0	2	0	2	0	0.00%	0	0	5	0	0
4	DF	Elizabeth Eddy	2	0	26	0	0	0	0	0	--	0	0	0	0	0
6	DF	Abby Erceg	8	8	687	1	1	0	6	3	50.00%	0	0	3	1	1
23	FW	Kristen Hamilton	5	1	154	2	0	0	2	2	100.00%	0	0	6	0	0
12	FW	Ashley Hatch	8	2	266	2	0	0	12	8	66.67%	0	0	5	1	0
15	DF	Jaelene Hinkle	8	8	694	0	1	0	4	1	25.00%	1	2	8	0	0
16	FW	Darian Jenkins	0	0	0	0	0	0	0	0	--	0	0	0	0	0
20	DF	Yuri Kawamura	8	7	588	0	0	0	2	1	50.00%	0	0	10	1	0
14	FW	Jessica McDonald	8	7	620	2	1	0	19	8	42.11%	0	2	1	0	0
5	MF	Samantha Mewis	10	10	900	2	2	2	16	7	43.75%	7	0	11	2	0
17	DF	Courtney Niemiec	0	0	0	0	0	0	0	0	--	0	0	0	0	0
22	DF	Stephanie Ochs	1	0	3	0	0	0	0	0	--	0	0	0	0	0
8	MF	Rosana Rosana	4	1	68	0	0	0	1	1	100.00%	0	1	5	0	0
0	GK	Katelyn Rowland	3	3	270	0	0	0	0	0	--	0	0	0	0	0
11	DF	Taylor Smith	10	5	553	0	1	0	2	2	100.00%	0	0	13	1	0
26	DF	Meredith Speck	2	0	17	0	0	0	0	0	--	0	0	0	0	0
9	FW	Lynn Williams	9	9	810	3	2	0	30	16	53.33%	0	7	3	0	0
26	MF	Sam Witteman	7	4	305	0	0	0	1	1	100.00%	0	0	8	1	0
7	MF	McCall Zerboni	10	10	900	2	1	0	10	5	50.00%	3	0	21	4	0
Team Total			140	110	9867	17	12	2	131	69	52.67%	80	12	110	11	1

== See also ==
- 2016 Western New York Flash season
- 2017 National Women's Soccer League season
- 2017 in American soccer
