= 2016 Western New York Flash season =

Western New York Flash
2016 Western New York Flash season
- President: Alexandra Sahlen
- Head coach: Paul Riley
- Stadium: Rochester Rhinos Stadium
- NWSL: 4th
- 2016 NWSL Playoffs: Winners
- Top goalscorer: League: Lynn Williams (11); All: Lynn Williams (14)
- Highest home attendance: 6,449 (Aug. 27 vs. Houston)
- Lowest home attendance: 2,235 (June 17 vs. Portland)
- Average home league attendance: 3,868
Home colors	Away colors

The 2016 season was Western New York Flash's ninth season, the fourth in which they competed in the National Women's Soccer League, the top division of women's soccer in the United States. The season ended with the Flash's first finals appearance since the 2013 NWSL season and the franchise's first NWSL Championship victory. It was also the final season of the NWSL franchise's existence in Rochester, New York, or as the Western New York Flash, after being purchased by the North Carolina FC organization, moved to Cary, North Carolina, and rebranded as the North Carolina Courage in January 2017. It was replaced in March 2017 by a new Buffalo-based Western New York Flash team in United Women's Soccer.

== First-team squad ==
Note: Flags indicate national team as defined under FIFA eligibility rules; some limited exceptions apply. Players may hold more than one non-FIFA nationality.

No.	Pos.	Nation	Player
0	GK	USA	Katelyn Rowland
1	GK	CAN	Sabrina D'Angelo
2	MF	USA	Michaela Hahn
3	FW	USA	Makenzy Doniak
4	MF	USA	Elizabeth Eddy
5	MF	USA	Samantha Mewis
6	DF	NZL	Abby Erceg
7	MF	USA	McCall Zerboni
9	FW	USA	Lynn Williams

No.	Pos.	Nation	Player
11	FW	USA	Taylor Smith
13	MF	USA	Abby Dahlkemper
14	FW	USA	Jessica McDonald
15	DF	USA	Jaelene Hinkle
17	FW	USA	Kristen Hamilton
19	FW	CAN	Adriana Leon
22	DF	USA	Laura Liedle
23	DF	USA	Courtney Niemiec
24	DF	AUS	Alanna Kennedy
25	MF	USA	Meredith Speck
28	GK	USA	Britt Eckerstrom

== Match results ==
=== Pre-season ===
The Flash announced their preseason schedule on March 11, 2016.

Sat Mar 19 1	Western New York Flash	3–0	West Virginia Mountaineers	Elma, New York
	Eddy 50'; Andrade 80'; Zimmerman 82'	Report		Stadium: Sahlen's Sports Park; Attendance: 1,052; Referee: Greg Irwin

Sat Apr 2 2	Western New York Flash	Cancelled	Penn State Nittany Lions	Elma, New York
		Cancellation		Stadium: Sahlen's Sports Park
Note: Cancelled due to scheduling conflicts.

Sat Apr 2 2	Syracuse Orange	0–1	Western New York Flash	Syracuse, New York
		Report	Williams 37'	Stadium: SU Soccer Stadium; Attendance: Closed-door
Note: 45-minute match.

Sat Apr 2 3	Western New York Flash	4–0	Vermont Catamounts	Syracuse, New York
	Zimmerman 13'; Doniak 20'; McDonald 24'; Ayinde 45'	Report		Stadium: SU Soccer Stadium; Attendance: Closed-door
Note: 45-minte match.

=== Regular season ===
Sat Apr 16 1	FC Kansas City	0–1	Western New York Flash	Kansas City, Missouri
		Report	Sam Mewis 71' (penalty)	Stadium: Children's Mercy Park; Attendance: 8,022

Sat Apr 23 2	Chicago Red Stars	1–0	Western New York Flash	Bridgeview, Illinois
	Casey Short 28' (unassisted)	Report		Stadium: Toyota Park; Attendance: 2,529

Fri Apr 29 3	Western New York Flash	0–3	Washington Spirit	Rochester, New York
	Elizabeth Eddy (yellow card) 80'	Report; Report	Diana Matheson 4' (Crystal Dunn), 72' (pen.); Elizabeth Eddy 82' (o.g.)	Stadium: Sahlen's Stadium; Attendance: 3,615

Sat May 7 4	Sky Blue FC	1–2	Western New York Flash	Piscataway, New Jersey
	Maya Hayes 35' (Raquel Rodriguez); Nikki Stanton (yellow card) 41'; Caroline Stanley (yellow card) 71'	Report	Abby Dahlkemper (yellow card) 4'; Jaelene Hinkle 71' (penalty); Samantha Mewis 86' (unassisted); Kristen Hamilton (yellow card) 90+3'	Stadium: Yurcak Field; Attendance: 1,252; Referee: Ekaterina Koroleva

Sat May 14 5	Orlando Pride	1–0	Western New York Flash	Orlando, Florida
	Morgan 79'	Report	Erceg (yellow card) 50' (yellow card) 89' (red card)	Stadium: Camping World Stadium; Attendance: 7,841; Referee: Levi Rippy

Sat May 21 6	Western New York Flash	5–2	Sky Blue FC	Rochester, New York
		Report		Stadium: Sahlen's Stadium; Attendance: 3,910; Referee: Farhad Dadkho

Fri May 27 7	Western New York Flash	4–0	Boston Breakers	Rochester, New York
	Smith 15'; Williams 64' (Hahn); Williams 65' (Speck); Dahlkemper 78' (pen.)	Report	Beckmann (yellow card) 90'	Stadium: Sahlen's Stadium; Attendance: 3,940; Referee: Andrew Musashe

Sat Jun 11 8	Western New York Flash	1–0	Orlando Pride	Rochester, New York
	Doniak 4' (McDonald); Speck (yellow card) 47+'; Leon (yellow card) 83'	Report	Spencer (yellow card) 76'	Stadium: Sahlen's Stadium; Attendance: 4,526; Referee: Elvis Mahmutovi

Fri Jun 17 9	Western New York Flash	0–2	Portland Thorns FC	Rochester, New York
	Samantha Mewis (yellow card) 47'; Alanna Kennedy (yellow card) 55'; Makenzy Doniak (yellow card) 90'	Report	Christine Sinclair 46' (Allie Long); Nadia Nadim 73' (pen.); Hayley Raso (yellow card) 81'	Stadium: Sahlen's Stadium; Attendance: 2,235; Referee: Victor Rivas

Fri Jun 24 10	Western New York Flash	7–1	Boston Breakers	Rochester, New York
7:00 p.m. ET	Lynn Williams 19' (Makenzy Doniak), 39' (Jessica McDonald); Jessica McDonald 28' (Samantha Mewis), 43' (Liz Eddy), 49' (Lynn Williams); Alanna Kennedy (yellow card) 35'; Makenzy Doniak 45+2' (Samantha Mewis); McCall Zerboni (yellow card) 60'; Taylor Smith 63' (Jaelene Hinkle)	Report; Report	Christen Westphal 38'	Stadium: Sahlen's Stadium; Attendance: 3,024; Referee: Guido Gonzales Jr.

Fri Jul 1 11	Western New York Flash	2–0	Chicago Red Stars	Rochester, New York
	Lianne Sanderson 37'; Lynn Williams 74' (Jessica McDonald); McCall Zerboni (yellow card) 78'	Report		Stadium: Sahlen's Stadium; Attendance: 3,114; Referee: Danielle Brzezinski-Chesky

Sat Jul 9 12	Western New York Flash	3–2	Seattle Reign FC	Rochester, New York
19:00	Erceg 39' 45+4'; Williams 83'	Summary; Report	Kawasumi 22'; Winters (yellow card) 64'; Mathias (yellow card) 82'; Utsugi 90+1'	Stadium: Frontier Field; Attendance: 4,314; Referee: (United States) Karen Abt

Sat Jul 16 13	Seattle Reign FC	1–1	Western New York Flash	Seattle
22:00	Melis 3'; Winters (yellow card) 33'; Reed (yellow card) 74'	Summary; Report	McDonald 45'; Zerboni (yellow card) 47'	Stadium: Memorial Stadium; Attendance: 4,521; Referee: (United States) Ekaterina Koroleva

Sat Jul 23 14	Western New York Flash	0–1	FC Kansas City	Rochester, New York
19:05	Janice Cayman (yellow card) 20'; Hahn (yellow card) 45+3'	Summary; Report	Molly Menchel (yellow card) 54'; Groom 60'	Stadium: Sahlen's Stadium; Attendance: 3,556; Referee: (United States) Maraget Domka

Sat Jul 30 15	Houston Dash	3–3	Western New York Flash	Houston
	Rachel Daly 32' (unassisted); Kealia Ohai 47' (unassisted); Kealia Ohai 63' (Stephanie Ochs); Caity Heap (yellow card) 92+'	Report	Lianne Sanderson 3' (Lynn Williams); Jessica McDonald 70' (Lynn Williams); Lynn Williams 93+' (Jessica McDonald); Jaelene Hinkle (yellow card) 93+'; Abby Dahlkemper (yellow card) 96+'	Stadium: BBVA Compass Stadium; Attendance: 4,329; Referee: Matthew Franz

Sat Aug 27 16	Western New York Flash	2–2	Houston Dash	Rochester, New York
19:00	Sanderson 36'; Doniak 58'	Summary	O'Sullivan 27' (yellow card) 41'; Ohai 53'; Daly (yellow card) 86'	Stadium: Sahlen's Stadium; Attendance: 6,449; Referee: (United States) Victor Rivas

Sat Sep 3 17	Washington Spirit	1–1	Western New York Flash	Boyds, Maryland
	Katie Stengel 64' (Crystal Dunn); Diana Matheson (yellow card) 85'	Report	Elizabeth Eddy (yellow card) 40'; Samantha Mewis 86' (unassisted)	Stadium: Maryland SoccerPlex; Attendance: 4,527; Referee: Chris Spivey

Thu Sep 8 18	Boston Breakers	2–2	Western New York Flash	Boston, Massachusetts
	Kyah Simon 4' (J King); Natasha Dowie (yellow card) 9'; (goal) 51' (Louise Schillgard); Julie King (yellow card) 61'; Eunice Beckmann (yellow card) 68'	Report	Jessica McDonald 38' (Samantha Mewis); Lynn Williams 76' (Makenzy Doniak)	Stadium: Jordan Field; Attendance: 1,435; Referee: Cuauhtemoc Delgadillo

Sun Sep 11 19	Portland Thorns FC	3–2	Western New York Flash	Portland, Oregon
	Nadia Nadim 27' (penalty); Christine Sinclair 37'; Tobin Heath (yellow card) 58'; Dagný Brynjarsdóttir 69' (T Heath); Michelle Betos (yellow card) 71'	Report	Jaelene Hinkle (yellow card) 27'; Jessica McDonald 77' (Elizabeth Eddy); Lynn Williams 80' ([J McDonald)	Stadium: Providence Park; Attendance: 21,144; Referee: Marco Vega

Sat Sep 24 20	Boston Breakers	0–4	Western New York Flash	Boston, Massachusetts
	Angela Salem (yellow card) 45'+3; Katie Schoepfer (yellow card) 70'; Whitney Engen (yellow card) 71'	Report	Jessica McDonald 2' (Makenzy Doniak); Lynn Williams 24' (unassisted); Samantha Mewis 45' (McCall Zerboni); Alanna Kennedy (yellow card) 61'; Abby Dahlkemper 68' (penalty)	Stadium: Jordan Field; Attendance: 4,027; Referee: Karen Abt

=== Postseason playoff ===
Sun Oct 2 2:00 pm PDT NWSL Semifinals	Portland Thorns FC	3–4 (a.e.t.)	Western New York Flash	Portland, Oregon
14:00 UTC-08	Sinclair 39' (Reynolds); Brynjarsdottir (yellow card) 75'; Sonnett 78'; Horan 106+' (Brynjarsdottir); Heath (yellow card) 114'	Report	Mewis 16'; Kennedy (yellow card) 28'; Doniak 38' (McDonald); Dahlkemper (yellow card) 76'; Williams 98'; Williams 104' (Mewis); Eddy (yellow card) 109'; D'Angelo (yellow card) 121+'	Stadium: Providence Park; Attendance: 20,086; Referee: Marco Vega
Note: Flash Head Coach Paul Riley was ejected at 40' for arguing with officials. Assistant Coach Scott Vallow replaced Riley for the remainder of the match, as well as in the finals, for which Riley was also suspended.

Sun Oct 9 4:00 pm CDT 2016 NWSL Championship	Washington Spirit	2–2 (a.e.t.) (2–3 p)	Western New York Flash	Houston, Texas
16:00 UTC-05	Dunn 9' (Oyster) 91' (Krieger); Wys (yellow card) 122+'	Report	Mewis 14' (Williams); Zerboni (yellow card) 84'; Williams 124+' (McDonald)	Stadium: BBVA Compass Stadium; Attendance: 8,255; Referee: Christina Unkel
	Penalties
	Krieger (penalty missed); Nairn (penalty scored); Stengel (penalty scored); Huster (penalty missed); Matheson (penalty missed)		(penalty scored) Dahlkemper; (penalty scored) Hinkle; (penalty missed) McDonald; (penalty scored) Williams; (penalty missed) Mewis
Note: Flash Head Coach Paul Riley was suspended from coaching the team due to his ejection in the semifinals match against Portland. Assistant Coach Scott Vallow replaced Riley in the finals.

=== Standings ===
Pos	Team	Pld	W	D	L	GF	GA	GD	Pts	Qualification
1	Portland Thorns FC	20	12	5	3	35	19	+16	41	NWSL Shield
2	Washington Spirit	20	12	3	5	30	21	+9	39	NWSL Playoffs
3	Chicago Red Stars	20	9	6	5	24	20	+4	33	NWSL Playoffs
4	Western New York Flash (C)	20	9	5	6	40	26	+14	32	NWSL Playoffs
5	Seattle Reign FC	20	8	6	6	29	21	+8	30	
6	FC Kansas City	20	7	5	8	18	20	−2	26	
7	Sky Blue FC	20	7	5	8	24	30	−6	26	
8	Houston Dash	20	6	4	10	29	29	0	22	
9	Orlando Pride	20	6	1	13	20	30	−10	19	
10	Boston Breakers	20	3	2	15	14	47	−33	11	

Source: NWSL
Rules for classification: Tiebreakers
(C) Champions

Results summary

Overall								Home						Away					
Pld	Pts	W	L	T	GF	GA	GD	W	L	T	GF	GA	GD	W	L	T	GF	GA	GD
20	32	9	6	5	40	26	+14	6	3	1	24	13	+11	3	3	4	16	13	+3

Last updated: September 24, 2016
Source: National Women's Soccer League
Pld = Matches played; Pts = Points; W = Matches won; T = Matches tied; L = Matches lost; GF = Goals for; GA = Goals against; GD = Goal difference

Results by round

Round	1	2	3	4	5	6	7	8	9	10	11	12	13	14	15	16	17	18	19	20
Stadium	A	A	H	A	A	H	H	H	H	H	H	H	A	H	A	H	A	A	A	A
Result	W	L	L	W	L	W	W	W	L	W	W	W	D	L	D	D	D	D	L	W

Updated to match(es) played on September 11, 2016. Source: National Women's Soccer League
A = Away; H = Home; W = Win; D = Draw; L = Loss

== Squad statistics ==
Source: NWSL

Squad statistics are of regular season only

N	Pos	Player	GP	GS	Min	G	A	PK	Shot	SOG	SOG%	Cro	CK	Off	Foul	FS	YC	RC
16	FW	Lady Andrade	2	0	51	0	0	0	0	0	—	0	0	0	0	0	0	0
10	MF	Halimatu Ayinde	1	1	45	0	0	0	1	0	0%	0	0	0	1	0	0	0
20	MF	Janice Cayman	3	1	97	0	0	0	2	2	100%	0	0	0	1	4	1	0
1	GL	Sabrina D'Angelo	11	11	990	0	0	0	0	0	—	0	0	0	0	0	0	0
13	MF	Abby Dahlkemper	20	20	1800	2	1	2	14	8	57%	4	60	0	11	11	2	0
3	MF	Makenzy Doniak	20	15	1144	3	4	0	15	8	53%	13	1	1	6	15	1	0
28	GK	Britt Eckerstrom	3	3	270	0	0	0	0	0	—	0	1	0	0	1	0	0
4	MF	Elizabeth Eddy	20	20	1754	0	2	0	8	5	63%	6	8	1	21	12	3	0
6	DF	Abby Erceg	17	16	1474	2	1	0	13	4	31%	0	1	1	14	6	2	1
2	MF	Michaela Hahn	13	8	659	1	1	0	9	2	22%	0	0	0	3	4	1	0
17	FW	Kristen Hamilton	12	0	125	0	0	0	1	1	100%	0	0	0	3	1	1	0
15	DF	Jaelene Hinkle	15	15	1325	1	3	1	12	9	75%	12	38	0	9	9	2	0
8	MF	Ga Eul Jeon	2	1	85	0	0	0	0	0	—	0	1	0	1	4	0	0
24	DF	Alanna Kennedy	15	15	1298	0	1	0	11	6	55%	0	1	1	20	8	3	0
19	FW	Adriana Leon	10	3	342	0	0	0	12	3	25%	0	0	2	8	2	2	0
14	FW	Jessica McDonald	19	19	1665	10	7	0	61	34	56%	8	3	13	10	11	0	0
5	MF	Samantha Mewis	14	14	1260	5	2	1	39	17	44%	3	0	0	22	13	1	0
23	DF	Courtney Niemiec	6	4	397	0	0	0	2	1	50%	0	0	0	2	3	0	0
0	GK	Katelyn Rowland	6	6	540	0	0	0	0	0	—	0	0	0	0	0	0	0
10	FW	Lianne Sanderson	9	8	702	3	0	0	22	10	45%	3	1	3	5	13	0	0
11	FW	Taylor Smith	18	5	726	2	0	0	17	4	24%	1	1	0	9	11	1	0
25	FW	Meredith Speck	6	5	369	0	1	0	3	1	33%	1	1	2	3	0	1	0
9	FW	Lynn Williams	19	19	1670	11	5	0	70	34	49%	6	0	22	15	4	0	0
7	MF	McCall Zerboni	12	11	1011	0	1	0	13	4	31%	3	0	1	17	16	2	0
Team Total			20	—	19799	40	29	4	325	153	47%	60	117	47	181	148	23	1

N	Pos	Goal keeper	GP	GS	Min	GA	GA/G	PKA	PKF	Shot	SOG	Sav	Sav%	YC	RC
1	GK	Sabrina D'Angelo	11	11	990	16	1.45	3	4	105	52	35	67%	0	0
28	GK	Britt Eckerstrom	3	3	270	2	0.67	1	1	29	18	16	89%	0	0
0	GK	Katelyn Rowland	6	6	540	8	1.33	0	0	55	24	16	67%	0	0
Team Total			20	—	1800	26	1.30	4	5	189	94	67	71%	0	0

== See also ==
- 2016 National Women's Soccer League season
