= Abby Dahlkemper =

American soccer player (born 1993)

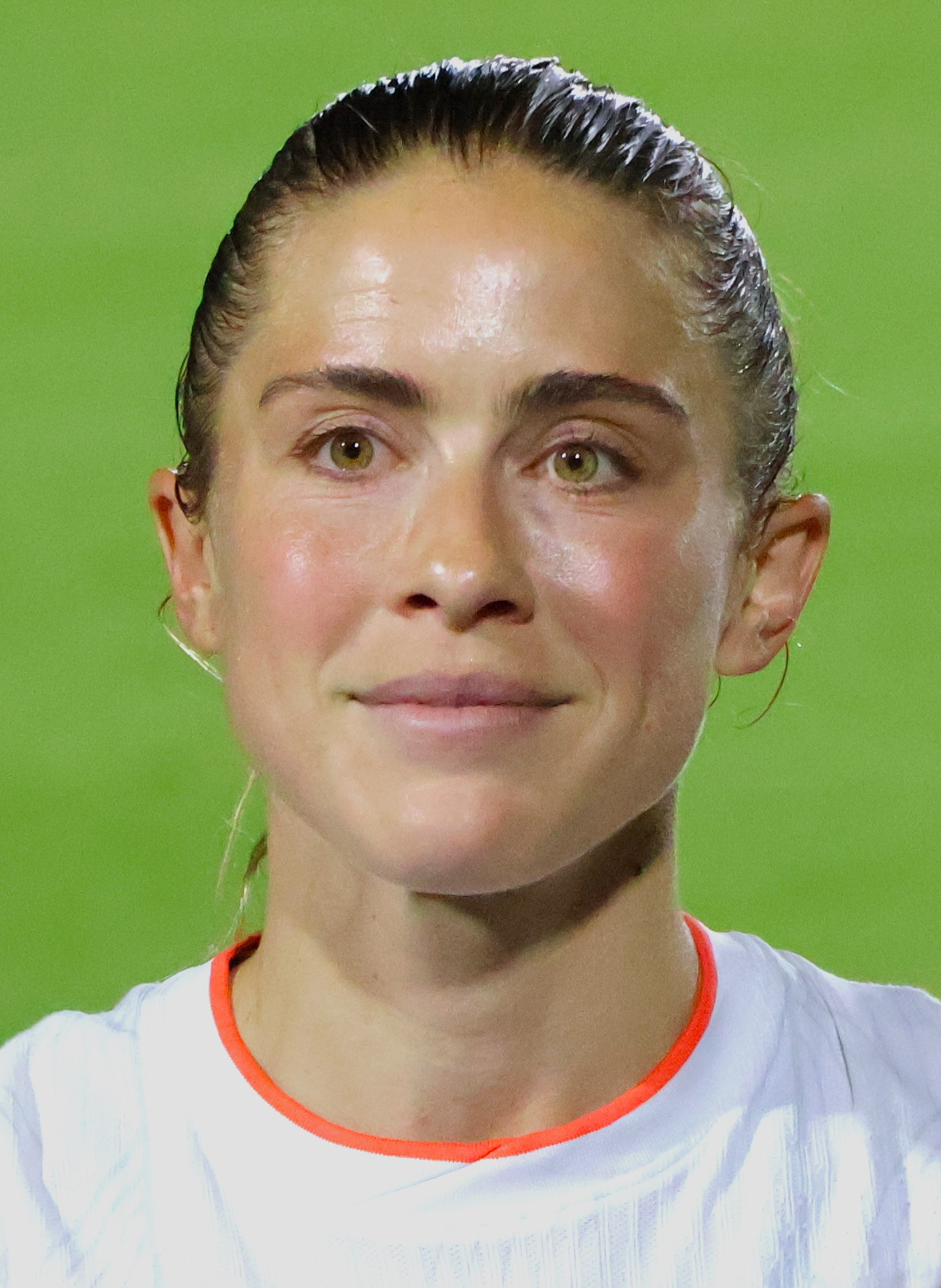
- Dahlkemper with Bay FC in 2025

Personal information
- Full name: Abigail Lynn Dahlkemper
- Date of birth: May 13, 1993 (age 33)
- Place of birth: Lancaster, Pennsylvania, U.S.
- Height: 5 ft 7 in (1.70 m)
- Position: Center back

Youth career
- 2005–2010: MVLA Avalanche
- 2008–2011: Sacred Heart Preparatory

College career
Years	Team	Apps	(Gls)
2011–2014	UCLA Bruins	93	(5)

Senior career*
Years	Team	Apps	(Gls)
2013	Pali Blues		
2014	LA Blues		
2015–2016	Western New York Flash	40	(2)
2015–2016	→ Adelaide United (loan)	12	(5)
2017–2020	North Carolina Courage	57	(0)
2021	Manchester City	8	(0)
2021	Houston Dash	8	(0)
2022–2024	San Diego Wave	27	(2)
2024–2026	Bay FC	24	(2)

International career^{‡}
2008–2010	United States U-17		
2011–2012	United States U-20		
2012–2016	United States U-23		
2016–	United States	84	(0)
Medal record
Representing United States
Olympic Games
Bronze medal – third place	2020 Tokyo	Team
FIFA Women's World Cup
Gold medal – first place	2019 France
- * Club domestic league appearances and goals as of 05:00, November 2, 2026 (UTC) ‡ National team caps and goals as of April 9, 2024

Abigail Lynn Dahlkemper (born May 13, 1993) is an American professional soccer player who plays as a center back for the United States national team.

Dahlkemper played collegiately for the UCLA Bruins, where she won the NCAA championship in 2013 and received the Honda Sports Award in 2014. She was the third overall pick by the Western New York Flash in the 2015 NWSL College Draft and won her first NWSL Championship with the Flash in 2016. Following the Flash's relocation, Dahlkemper was voted NWSL Defender of the Year in 2017 and won successive league doubles with the North Carolina Courage in 2018 and 2019.

== Early life ==
Dahlkemper was born in Lancaster, Pennsylvania, and raised in Menlo Park, California. She has two brothers, Andrew (the older) and Joseph (the younger) and is the daughter of Andrew and Susan Dahlkemper. She attended Sacred Heart Preparatory and played on the soccer team. In 2010, she was named Gatorade California Girls Soccer Player of the Year and a Parade All-American.

== College career ==
In 2013, she helped the UCLA Bruins win their first ever NCAA national championship. In 2014, Dahlkemper was awarded the Honda Sports Award.

== Club career ==
In 2013, Dahlkemper signed with the Pali Blues in the W-League. The team won the western conference title as well as the national championship in July 2013.

=== Western New York Flash ===
In January 2015, Dahlkemper was selected by the Western New York Flash in the 2015 NWSL College Draft as the third overall pick. She was signed to the team in March and made her debut in April. Dahlkemper won the NWSL Championship with the Flash in 2016.

In October 2015, Dahlkemper joined Adelaide United in the Australian W-League on loan for the 2015–16 season.

=== North Carolina Courage ===
Dahlkemper became part of the North Carolina Courage in 2017 after the Western New York Flash was sold to the owners of North Carolina FC. She played every minute for the Courage in 2017 helping them win the NWSL Shield. Dahlkemper was named to the 2017 NWSL Best XI. Dahlkemper was voted NWSL Defender of the Year for the 2017 Season.

In 2018 Dahlkemper played 19 regular season games for North Carolina. She was an important part of North Carolina's defense which broke the record for fewest goals conceded and repeated as NWSL Shield winners. She was named to the 2018 NWSL Best XI and was a finalist for Defender of the Year, losing to her Courage teammate Abby Erceg. North Carolina won the 2018 NWSL Championship with a 3–0 win over Portland, and didn't concede any goals in the playoffs.

=== Manchester City ===
On January 16, 2021, Dahlkemper joined Manchester City of the English FA WSL on a two-and-a-half-year deal, becoming the third American international to sign for the club during the 2020–21 season following Sam Mewis and Rose Lavelle's arrivals in summer. On August 20, 2021, Manchester City announced that Dahlkemper had left the club.

=== Houston Dash ===
On August 29, 2021, Houston Dash announced that they had acquired Dahlkemper from the North Carolina Courage.

=== San Diego Wave ===
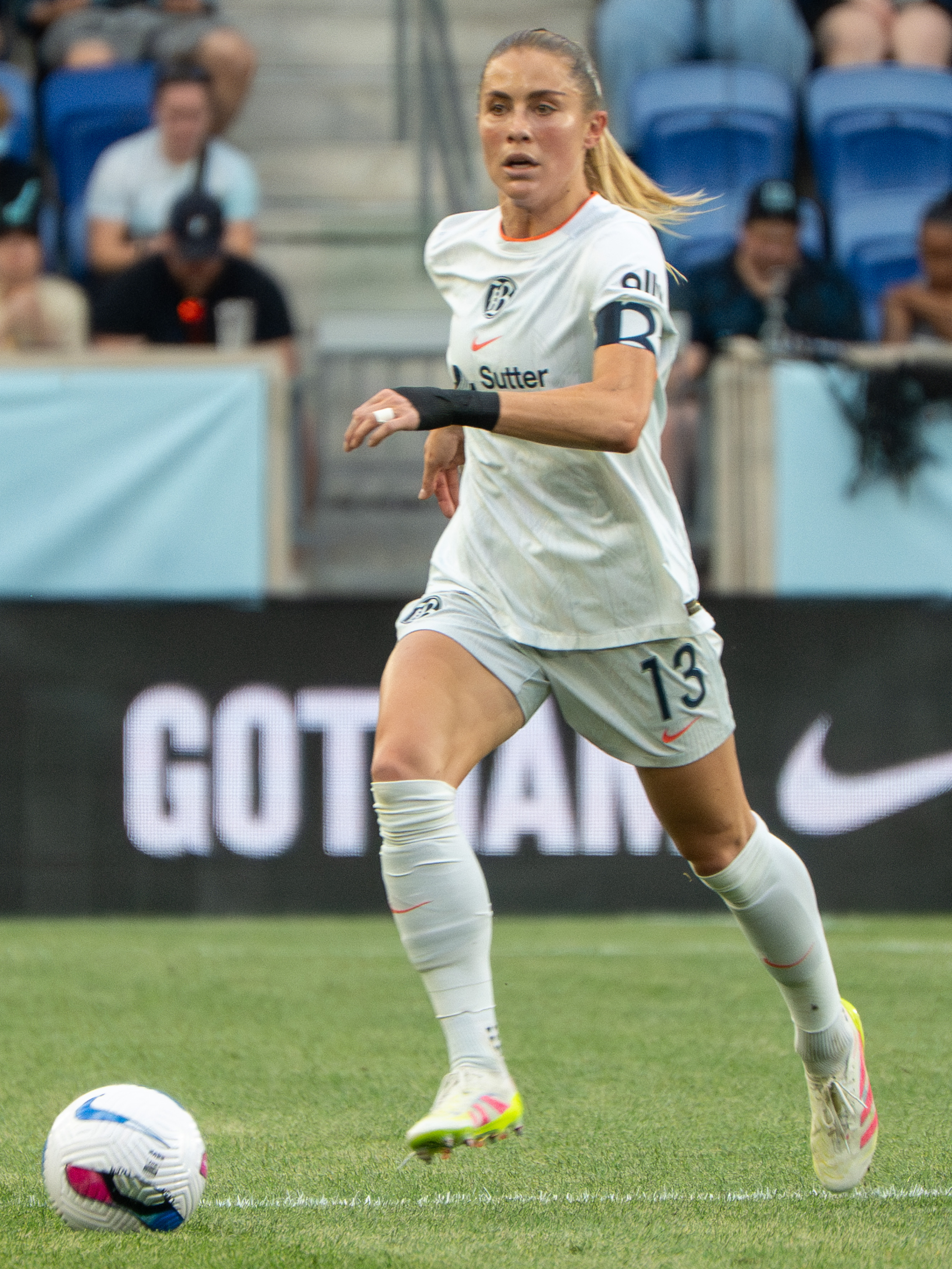
Abby Dahlkemper with Bay FC in 2025

On November 22, 2021, Dahlkemper was announced as the first-ever player signing by NWSL expansion club San Diego Wave FC. Dahlkemper was plagued with injuries in 2022, including fracturing a rib in May, and dealing with a back injury causing her to miss games throughout the year. She was ultimately given a Season-Ending Injury designation in October 2022, missing the 2022 NWSL playoffs. Dahlkemper had surgery on her back in November 2022, stating on her social media it was transforaminal lumbar interbody fusion (TLIF) surgery to relieve her sciatic nerve pain.

Dahlkemper made her return to the field on August 5, 2023, in a Challenge Cup game against Angel City, and was named to NWSL's August Best XI of the Month in her first month back.

=== Bay FC ===
On August 26, 2024, Bay FC announced that they had acquired Dahlkemper from San Diego Wave FC in exchange for $50,000 in allocation money. Dahlkemper then signed a contract extension through 2026 with an option for 2027. Dahlkemper debuted for her hometown team in a friendly against FC Barcelona, and later that week debuted in a 3-1 away to Portland Thorns in which she scored her first goal for Bay. She became the fifth ever NWSL player to score in back to back regular season matches for different clubs, having scored in the previous week for San Diego Wave in her final match with the club.

Dahlkemper missed the final stretch of the 2025 season and first half of the 2026 season due to maternity leave. She returned to the field on July 29, 2026, subbing on for Joelle Anderson in a loss to Gotham FC. She appeared once more for Bay FC before departing upon the expiration of her contract.

== International career ==
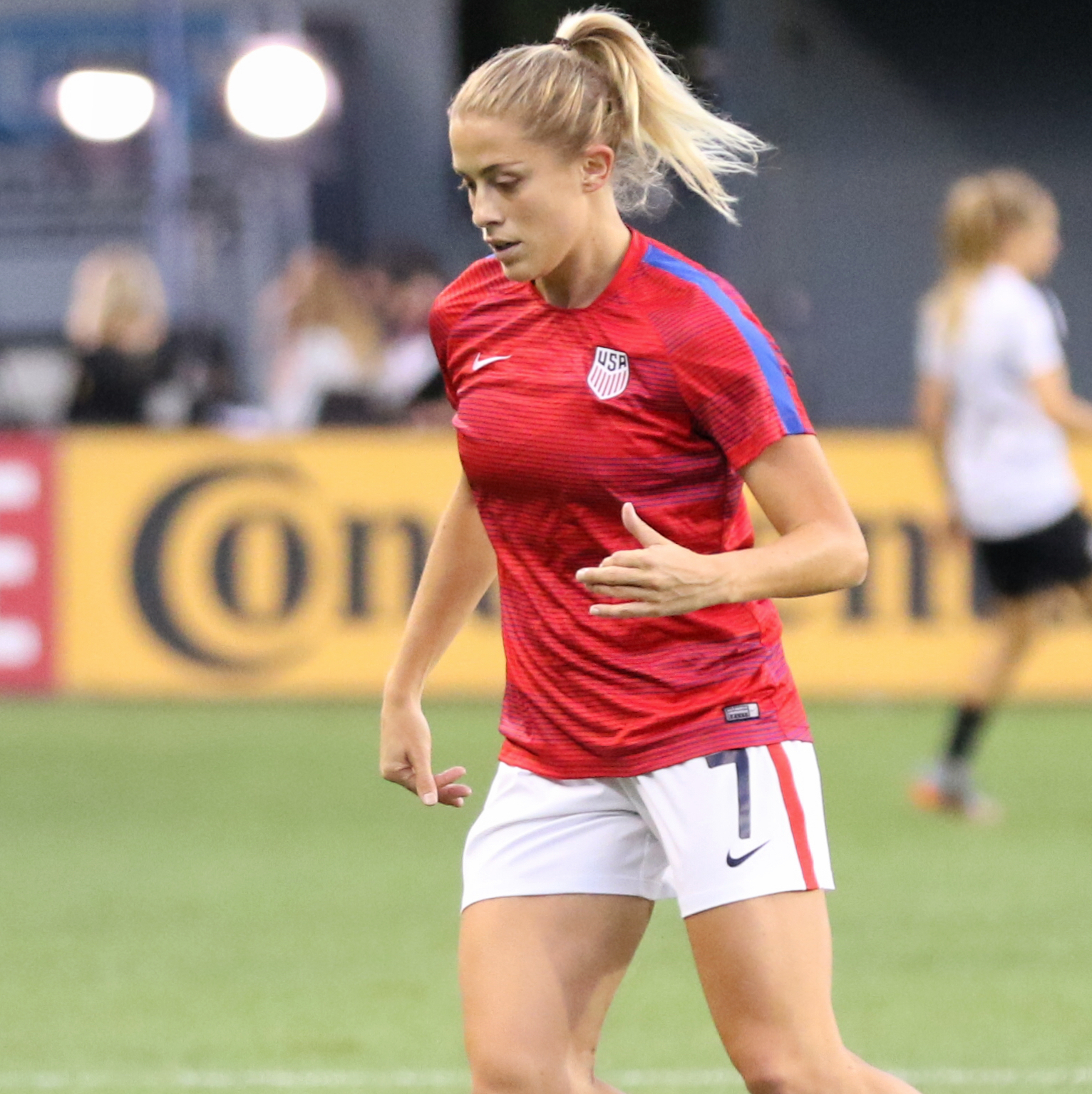
Dahlkemper in 2017

In 2013, Dahlkemper represented the United States under-23 women's national soccer team at the 2013 Four Nations Tournament helping the under-23 team win the championship. She played in the 2014 Six Nations Tournament as a member of the under-23 team and helped lead the team to win the championship for a second time.

Dahlkemper received her first call-up to the U.S. Women's National Team in October 2016 for a set of friendlies against Switzerland. On October 19 she earned her first cap, as she came in as a second-half substitute. Due to a sepsis infection contracted at the end of 2016, Dahlkemper was unable to appear for the U.S. WNT until June 2017.

Following her recovery from sepsis, Dahlkemper quickly became a mainstay for the United States in central defense. She played her first 90 for the U.S. WNT against Norway on June 11, 2017. Dahlkemper would start 10 of the final 11 games of the year, accumulating 945 minutes in 2017, which was fifth highest on the team.

In 2018 Dahlkemper won the SheBelieves Cup and the Tournament of Nations with the U.S. WNT. On September 19, she was named to the final 20 player roster for the 2018 CONCACAF Women's Championship.

In 2019, Dahlkemper was the starting central defender for the national team beside Becky Sauerbrunn at the 2019 FIFA Women's World Cup in France, marking her first World Cup appearance. Dahlkemper and goalkeeper Alyssa Naeher were the only players to start every match of the tournament for the United States, with Dahlkemper playing every minute of the team's seven games aside from coming off in the 82nd minute against Chile in the group stage. Dahlkemper and the United States defeated the Netherlands 2–0 in the final to win the United States' fourth Women's World Cup title.

== Personal life ==
In 2019, along with USWNT teammates Crystal Dunn, Megan Rapinoe, and Alex Morgan, Dahlkemper posed for the 2019 Sports Illustrated Swimsuit Issue in Saint Lucia. She is married to Aaron Schoenfeld. They started dating in May 2019 and announced their engagement in December 2020. They married in a private ceremony on January 5, 2021. On September 10, 2025, the couple announced on Instagram that they were expecting their first child. Their son was born on February 25, 2026.

== Career statistics ==
=== Club ===
As of August 26, 2024.

Club	Season	League			Cup (Note: Includes NWSL Challenge Cup and Women's FA Cup)		Playoffs (Note: Includes USL W-League playoffs and NWSL Playoffs)		Continental (Note: Includes UEFA Women's Champions League)		Other		Total	
Club	Season	Division	Apps	Goals	Apps	Goals	Apps	Goals	Apps	Goals	Apps	Goals	Apps	Goals
Pali Blues	2013	USL W-League	?	?	—		2	0	—		—		2	0
Los Angeles Blues	2014	USL W-League	?	?	—		2	0	—		—		2	0
Western New York Flash	2015	NWSL	20	0	—		—		—		—		20	0
Western New York Flash	2016	NWSL	20	2	—		2	0	—		—		22	2
North Carolina Courage	2017	NWSL	24	0	—		2	0	—		—		26	0
North Carolina Courage	2018	NWSL	19	0	—		2	0	—		—		21	0
North Carolina Courage	2019	NWSL	14	0	—		2	0	—		—		16	0
North Carolina Courage	2020	NWSL	—		4	0	—		—		4 (Note: Includes the NWSL Fall Series)	1	8	1
Houston Dash	2021	NWSL	8	0	0	0	—		—		—		8	0
San Diego Wave FC	2022	NWSL	8	0	5	0	0	0	—		—		13	0
San Diego Wave FC	2023	NWSL	6	1	1	0	1	0	—		—		8	1
San Diego Wave FC	2024	NWSL	13	1	1	0	—		—		—		14	1
Adelaide United FC	2015–16	W-League	12	5	—		—		—		—		12	5
Manchester City W.F.C.	2020–21	FA WSL	8	0	1	0	—		4	0	—		13	0
Career total			152	9	12	0	13	0	4	0	4	1	185	10

=== International ===
As of match played April 9, 2024

Appearances and goals by national team and year
National team	Year	Apps	Goals
United States	2016	2	0
United States	2017	11	0
United States	2018	17	0
United States	2019	23	0
United States	2020	9	0
United States	2021	15	0
United States	2022	2	0
United States	2023	1	0
United States	2024	4	0
Total		84	0

== Honors ==
UCLA

- NCAA Women's Soccer Championship: 2013

Western New York Flash

- NWSL Champions: 2016

North Carolina Courage

- NWSL Champions: 2018, 2019
- NWSL Shield: 2017, 2018, 2019

San Diego Wave

- NWSL Shield: 2023
- NWSL Challenge Cup: 2024

United States

- FIFA Women's World Cup: 2019
- Olympic Bronze Medal: 2020
- CONCACAF Women's Championship: 2018
- CONCACAF W Gold Cup: 2024
- CONCACAF Women's Olympic Qualifying Tournament: 2020
- SheBelieves Cup: 2018, 2020, 2021,2024
- Tournament of Nations: 2018

Individual

- Honda Sports Award: 2014
- NWSL Defender of the Year: 2017
- NWSL Best XI: 2017, 2018, 2019

== See also ==
- List of United States women's international soccer players
- List of UCLA Bruins people
- List of Adelaide United FC club award winners
