= Sabrina D'Angelo =

Canadian soccer player (born 1993)

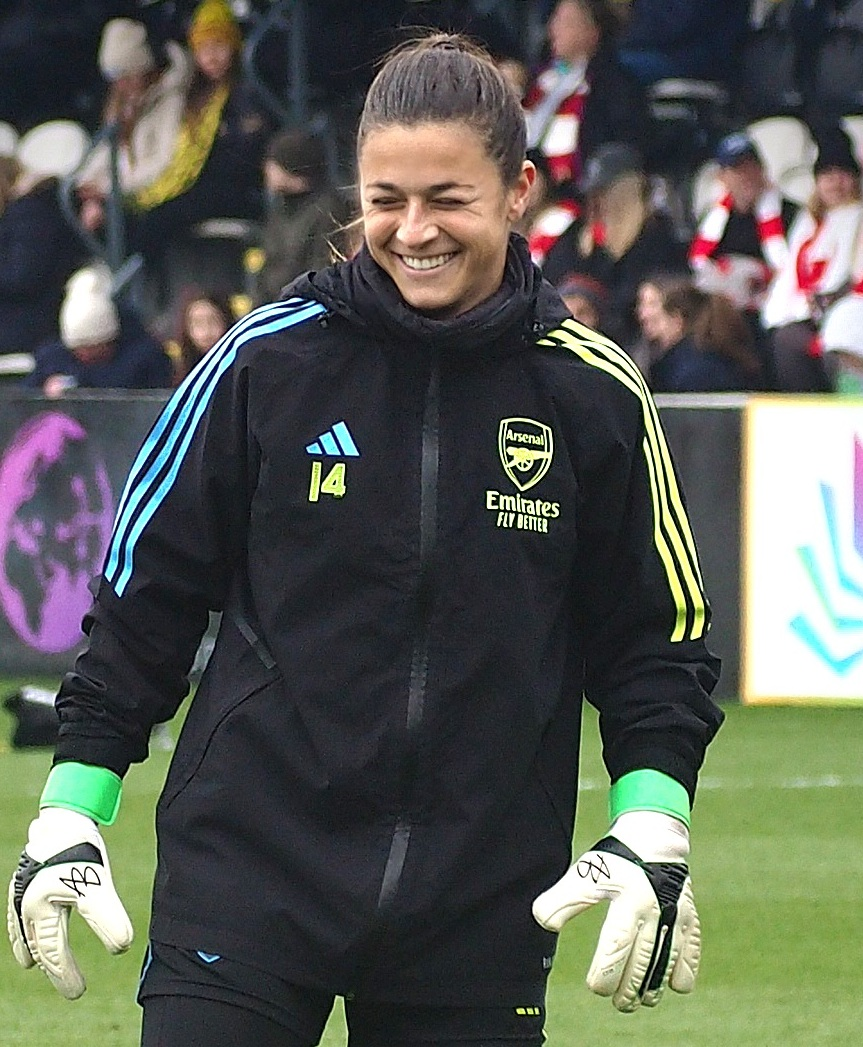
- D'Angelo with Arsenal in 2023

Personal information
- Full name: Sabrina Victoria D'Angelo
- Date of birth: May 11, 1993 (age 33)
- Place of birth: Welland, Ontario, Canada
- Height: 1.73 m (5 ft 8 in)
- Position: Goalkeeper

Team information
- Current team: AFC Toronto
- Number: 18

Youth career
- Welland Wizards SC
- Niagara United SC

College career
Years	Team	Apps	(Gls)
2011–2014	South Carolina Gamecocks	83	(0)

Senior career*
Years	Team	Apps	(Gls)
2010, 2012	Toronto Lady Lynx	8	(0)
2015–2016	Western New York Flash	18	(0)
2017–2018	North Carolina Courage	14	(0)
2019–2022	Vittsjö GIK	70	(0)
2023–2024	Arsenal	8	(0)
2024–2026	Aston Villa	38	(0)
2026–	AFC Toronto	14	(0)

International career^{‡}
2008–2010	Canada U17	11	(0)
2012	Canada U20	8	(0)
2016–	Canada	25	(0)
Medal record
Women's football
Representing Canada
Olympic Games
Bronze medal – third place	2016 Rio de Janeiro	Team
- * Club domestic league appearances and goals as of October 28, 2026 ‡ National team caps and goals as of October 12, 2026

Sabrina Victoria D'Angelo (/diˈændʒəloʊ/; born May 11, 1993) is a Canadian professional soccer player who plays as a goalkeeper for Northern Super League club AFC Toronto and the Canada national team.

D'Angelo played college soccer for the South Carolina Gamecocks and was selected 21st overall in the 2015 NWSL College Draft by the Western New York Flash. She was the MVP of the 2016 NWSL Championship in which she made three saves in the penalty shoot-out. The following year, the Flash moved to become the North Carolina Courage, where she won two NWSL Shields and one further Championship. In 2019, D'Angelo began a four-year spell with Swedish club Vittsjö GIK before entering the Women's Super League, first with Arsenal and then Aston Villa.

D'Angelo led Canada to gold at the 2010 CONCACAF Women's U-17 Championship and silver at the 2012 CONCACAF Women's U-20 Championship, being named the Canada Soccer U20 Player of the Year for the latter. She made her senior debut for Canada in 2016. She was included on her country's squads at the 2016 and 2024 Olympics and the 2019 and 2023 FIFA Women's World Cups.

== Early life ==
D'Angelo was born to Gerry and Bonnie D'Angelo in Welland, Ontario. She has an older brother, Derek. Growing up, D'Angelo took part in both dancing and soccer, as well as many other sports teams at school. D'Angelo attended Notre Dame College School in Welland, ON.

=== South Carolina Gamecocks ===
D'Angelo attended the University of South Carolina, where she played for the Gamecocks from 2011 to 2014.

In the 2011 season, D'Angelo started 20 of South Carolina's 21 matches and lead the SEC in goals against average (0.80) and was second in save percentage (0.824) for all matches. After just one season, she ranked all-time second in career goals against average at South Carolina. For 2011, D'Angelo was awarded numerous honours for the season, including SEC Co-Defensive Player of the Year, SEC Freshman of the Year, and SEC Goalkeeper of the Year, and she was the only freshman goalkeeper in the nation to make an All-Region team.

In 2012, D'Angelo started 16 of 17 matches after missing the first four games of the season while paying for the Canadian U-20 team at the U-20 Women's World Cup. D'Angelo only allowed 21 goals all season and recorded 55 saves. By the end of the season, she ranked third all-time in South Carolina history in career saves with 130.

D'Angelo started all 23 games for South Carolina in 2013 and recorded the second most shutouts in a season in school history with 12, seven of those in the first eight games of the season. She recorded 0.59 goals against average and 57 saves. She was a semifinalist for the MAC Hermann Trophy for 2013. She was also given NSCAA First Team All-America honours and NSCAA First Team All-South Region honours. She was also named SEC Defensive Player of the Year for the second time in her career.

D'Angelo was named team captain for the 2014 season and started 22 games before she injured her wrist, which kept her out of the net for the final three games of the season. She posted 10 shutouts, 54 saves, and a 0.58 goals against average. After her wrist injury, she logged minutes as a field player for two games.

== Club career ==
=== Western New York Flash ===
D'Angelo was selected 21st overall by the Western New York Flash of the National Women's Soccer League in the third round of the 2015 NWSL College Draft on January 16, 2015. She was signed as a drafted player and made seven starts in seven appearances for the Flash in 2015, allowing 11 goals.

On February 8, 2016, it was announced that D'Angelo would be allocated by the Canadian Soccer Association for the 2016 NWSL Season.

On May 21, 2016 D'Angelo broke her left wrist during warmups before a game between the Western New York Flash and Sky Blue FC; however, she still played all 90 minutes of the game. She had surgery to repair her wrist on June 3 and was optimistic that she would recover quickly. She made six appearances for the Flash before she was injured.

D'Angelo was named the 2016 NWSL Championship MVP as she made 3 saves during the penalty shootout, leading the Western New York Flash to the 2016 NWSL Championship.

=== North Carolina Courage ===
On January 9, 2017 the Western New York Flash became the North Carolina Courage as the team was sold and relocated to Cary, North Carolina. D'Angelo began the 2017 season as North Carolina's number one keeper, as she started seven of their first eight games. After that her playing time was very limited as Katelyn Rowland took over as North Carolina's number one keeper.

In 2018 D'Angelo was once again behind Rowland on North Carolina's depth chart, as she only played in seven regular season games. The Courage participated in the inaugural Women's International Champions Cup in July 2018. D'Angelo started in goal in the Championship Game and held Olympique Lyonnais scoreless as North Carolina won 1–0.

in the 2018 Play-offs, D'Angelo started North Carolina's semi-final game against the Chicago Red Stars as Rowland was recovering from a concussion. She recorded a shutout as the Courage won 2–0, and advanced to their second straight championship game.

=== Vittsjö GIK ===
After four seasons in the NWSL, D'Angelo would sign with Damallsvenskan club Vittsjö GIK in December 2018.

=== Arsenal ===
In January 2023, D'Angelo joined English Women's Super League club Arsenal. She made her debut for the club on January 26, playing the full quarterfinals game against Aston Villa in the FA Women's League Cup. Having kept clean sheets against Aston Villa, and against Manchester City in the tournament's semifinal, she was part of the Arsenal squad which won the 2022–23 FA Women's League Cup on March 5, 2023. She made 15 appearances in all competitions for Arsenal during her time at the club.

=== Aston Villa ===
After leaving Arsenal at the end of her contract, D'Angelo signed for fellow WSL club Aston Villa on July 31, 2024.

=== AFC Toronto ===
On June 26, 2026, she signed with Northern Super League club AFC Toronto, with the contract taking effect on July 1.

== International career ==
=== Youth teams ===
D'Angelo was first called up to the Canada Women's U-17 team in June 2007 for a nine-day training camp in Ottawa when she was 14.

In July 2008, D'Angelo was named to the roster for the first 2008 CONCACAF Women's Under-17 Championship in Trinidad and Tobago; however, she made no appearance for the team during the tournament. Canada's third-place finish in the tournament gave them a spot in the inaugural FIFA U-17 Women's World Cup in October. D'Angelo was named to the roster for the U-17 World Cup, but once again made no appearance for the team.

D'Angelo made her first appearance for the U-17 team in March 2010 during the CONCACAF Women's Under-17 Championship in Costa Rica. She started all five of Canada's matches in the tournament, recording two shutouts and helping Canada win their first championship title and qualify for the 2010 FIFA U-17 Women's World Cup in Trinidad and Tobago. In September 2010, D'Angelo started all three of Canada's matches in the U-17 Women's World Cup, recording a shutout against Ghana.

Following an impressive showing at the U-17 Women's World Cup, D'Angelo was called up to train with the Canada senior national team in October 2010. Following the training camp, she was named to the roster for the Torneio Internacional Cidade de São Paulo that took place in December 2010, but made no appearance.

In 2012, D'Angelo made the transition to the U-20 team and was named to the roster for the 2012 CONCACAF Women's Under-20 Championship in March. D'Angelo started in all five of Canada's matches of the tournament. Canada won the silver medal and qualified for the 2012 FIFA U-20 Women's World Cup in Japan. D'Angelo was on the roster for the World Cup in August and started in all three of Canada's matches in the tournament; however, Canada came in 11th place. Following the tournament, D'Angelo was named 2012 Canadian U-20 Player of the Year.

In February 2013, D'Angelo was named to the 23-player squad of potential Canada's Women's National Team players for the first EXCELeration camp that took place in Florida.

=== Senior team ===
D'Angelo finally made the transition to the full Canada senior national team in December 2015, when she was called up to train with the team. She was then named to the roster for the 2016 CONCACAF Women's Olympic Qualifying Tournament in February, although she made no appearances.

D'Angelo made her first appearance for the national team on March 4, 2016 during the Algarve Cup in Portugal against Belgium. She posted a clean sheet for the match. She made one other appearance during the tournament on March 9, coming in for Stephanie Labbé in the 46th minute.

Following a major injury of Canada's starting goalkeeper, Erin McLeod, in March 2016, D'Angelo was named to the roster for the 2016 Rio Olympics. At the 2016 Olympics D'Angelo appeared in one game in goal for Canada, as she was the back-up keeper behind Stephanie Labbé. Canada would go on to win the bronze medal.

D'Angelo appeared in two matches for Canada in 2017. She has received fewer call-ups since 2016 as former starting keeper Erin McLeod has recovered from injury, and has assumed the back-up role behind Labbé. On May 25, 2019 D'Angelo was named to the roster for the 2019 FIFA Women's World Cup.

D'Angelo was called up to the Canada squad for the 2022 CONCACAF W Championship, where Canada finished as runners-up.

D'Angelo was called up to the 23-player Canada squad for the 2023 FIFA Women's World Cup.

D'Angelo was called up to the Canada squad for the 2024 CONCACAF W Gold Cup, which Canada finished as semifinalists.

D'Angelo was called up to the Canada squad for the 2024 Summer Olympics.

== Career statistics ==
=== Club ===
As of match played October 28, 2026

Appearances and goals by club, season and competition
Club	Season	League			Playoffs		National cup		League cup		Total	
Club	Season	Division	Apps	Goals	Apps	Goals	Apps	Goals	Apps	Goals	Apps	Goals
Western New York Flash	2015	NWSL	7	0	0	0	0	0	0	0	7	0
Western New York Flash	2016	NWSL	11	0	2	0	0	0	0	0	13	0
Western New York Flash	Total		18	0	2	0	0	0	0	0	20	0
North Carolina Courage	2017	NWSL	8	0	0	0	0	0	0	0	8	0
North Carolina Courage	2018	NWSL	6	0	1	0	0	0	0	0	7	0
North Carolina Courage	Total		14	0	1	0	0	0	0	0	15	0
Vittsjö GIK	2019	Damallsvenskan	20	0	0	0	0	0	0	0	20	0
Vittsjö GIK	2020	Damallsvenskan	3	0	0	0	0	0	0	0	3	0
Vittsjö GIK	2021	Damallsvenskan	22	0	0	0	0	0	0	0	22	0
Vittsjö GIK	2022	Damallsvenskan	25	0	0	0	0	0	0	0	25	0
Vittsjö GIK	Total		70	0	0	0	0	0	0	0	70	0
Arsenal	2022–23	FA WSL	4	0	0	0	0	0	2	0	6	0
Arsenal	2023–24	FA WSL	4	0	0	0	1	0	4	0	9	0
Arsenal	Total		8	0	0	0	1	0	6	0	15	0
Aston Villa	2024–25	FA WSL	22	0	0	0	3	0	3	0	28	0
Aston Villa	2025–26	FA WSL	16	0	0	0	0	0	0	0	16	0
Aston Villa	Total		38	0	0	0	3	0	3	0	44	0
AFC Toronto	2026	Northern Super League	14	0	0	0	–		–		14	0
Career total			161	0	3	0	4	0	9	0	178	0

=== International ===
As of match played October 12, 2026

Appearances and goals by national team and year
National team	Year	Apps	Goals
Canada	2016	3	0
Canada	2017	2	0
Canada	2018	0	0
Canada	2019	2	0
Canada	2020	1	0
Canada	2021	0	0
Canada	2022	3	0
Canada	2023	3	0
Canada	2024	4	0
Canada	2025	5	0
Canada	2026	2	0
Total		25	0

== Honours ==
Western New York Flash

- NWSL Championship: 2016

North Carolina Courage

- NWSL Championship: 2018
- NWSL Shield: 2017, 2018

Arsenal

- FA Women's League Cup: 2022-23, 2023–24

Canada

- Summer Olympics bronze medal: 2016

Individual

- NWSL Championship Most Valuable Player: 2016
- Canadian U-20 Female Player of the Year: 2012
- NSCAA First-Team All-South Region: 2011, 2013, 2014
- NSCAA First-Team All-America: 2013, 2014
- NSCAA First-Team Scholar All-America: 2013, 2014
- SEC Defensive Player of the Year: 2011, 2013
- SEC Freshman of the Year: 2011
- First-Team All-SEC: 2011, 2013, 2014
- Second-Team All-SEC: 2012
- SEC All-Freshman Team: 2011
- SEC All-Tournament Team: 2013
- Soccer America All-Freshman First Team: 2011
- Soccer America MVPs Second Team: 2013
- Capital One Academic All-America First Team: 2014
- Capital One All-District Team: 2014
- President's Award: 2014
- TopDrawerSoccer Best XI First Team: 2013
