= Courtney Niemiec =

American soccer player

Personal information
- Full name: Courtney Tole
- Birth name: Courtney Niemiec
- Date of birth: April 13, 1992 (age 34)
- Place of birth: Philadelphia, Pennsylvania, U.S.
- Height: 5 ft 9 in (1.75 m)
- Position: Defender

Youth career
- FC Delco Sting

College career
Years	Team	Apps	(Gls)
2010–2013	La Salle Explorers	87	(8)

Senior career*
Years	Team	Apps	(Gls)
2014–2015	Portland Thorns FC	15	(0)
2016	Western New York Flash	6	(0)
2017	North Carolina Courage	0	(0)

Managerial career
- 2017–: La Salle Explorers (asst.)
- * Club domestic league appearances and goals as of May 28, 2017

Courtney Tole (née Niemiec; born April 13, 1992) is an American women's soccer coach for the La Salle Explorers women's soccer team, and a retired professional soccer player who last played as a defender for the North Carolina Courage of the National Women's Soccer League (NWSL).

== Early life ==
Tole was born in Philadelphia, Pennsylvania. She played high school soccer at Little Flower Catholic High School for Girls, where she was a four-year varsity letter-winner in both soccer and lacrosse, and played club soccer for FC Delco Sting.

=== Collegiate career ===
Tole attended La Salle University, where she played as a midfielder for the Explorers until switching to defense during the preseason of her sophomore year to cover for a teammate's injury. She scored 8 goals and had 14 assists in 87 appearances for the Explorers, starting every game her sophomore, junior, and senior seasons. The Atlantic 10 Conference named her its defensive player of the year in 2012 and to the all-conference first team in 2012 and 2013. The Explorers won the Atlantic 10 Conference Championship in 2012 and 2013, with Tole scoring in a penalty shoot-out in the latter to help secure the title.

La Salle named Tole to its Hall of Athletes in 2021.

== Club career ==
Tole registered for the 2014 NWSL College Draft but was not selected.

=== Portland Thorns (2014–2015) ===
In March 2014, Portland Thorns FC invited Tole to open tryouts and she was selected to the club's preseason roster. Portland signed Tole to a professional contract on April 9, 2014. Following an ankle injury to starter Rachel Van Hollebeke before the 2014 season's opening match, Tole became a starting outside back for the club.

On June 24, 2015, the Thorns waived Tole.

=== Western New York Flash (2016) ===
The Western New York Flash signed Tole for the 2016 season. Tole appeared in six matches for the Flash, starting in four, and played 395 total minutes. The team picked up her contract option to extend her through 2017. Tole was an unused substitute for the Flash in the 2016 NWSL Championship match, which the Flash won in a penalty shoot-out.

=== North Carolina Courage (2017) ===
On January 9, 2017, the NWSL announced that the Western New York Flash's NWSL franchise rights had been sold to new ownership, with its roster and player rights reassigned to the newly created North Carolina Courage.

On May 27, 2017, Tole announced her retirement from professional soccer without making an appearance for the Courage.

== Coaching career ==
After retiring as a player, Tole joined the La Salle Explorers women's soccer coaching staff in July 2017 as an assistant coach while returning to the university to attend graduate school.

== Career statistics ==
Appearances and goals by club, season and competition
Club	Season	League	League		Playoffs		Total	
Club	Season	League	Apps	Goals	Apps	Goals	Apps	Goals
Portland Thorns FC	2014	NWSL	11	0	0	0	11	0
Portland Thorns FC	2015	NWSL	4	0	–		4	0
Western New York Flash	2016	NWSL	6	0	0	0	6	0
North Carolina Courage	2017	NWSL	0	0	0	0	0	0
Career total			21	0	0	0	21	0

== Awards and honors ==
La Salle University

- Atlantic 10 Conference Championship: 2012, 2013

Western New York Flash

- National Women's Soccer League Championship: 2016

Individual

- Atlantic 10 Defensive Player of the Year: 2012
- First Team All-Atlantic 10: 2012, 2013
- First Team NSCAA All-Mid Atlantic Region: 2012
- Second Team NSCAA All-Mid Atlantic Region: 2013
- La Salle University Hall of Athletes: 2021
