= Jackie Acevedo =

American-born Mexican footballer (born 1987)

Personal information
- Full name: Jackie Lynn Acevedo Rangel
- Date of birth: 18 January 1987 (age 39)
- Place of birth: Austin, Texas, United States
- Height: 5 ft 2 in (1.57 m)
- Position: Striker

College career
Years	Team	Apps	(Gls)
2008	Tennessee Lady Volunteers		
2009–2011	Southern Nazarene Crimson Storm		

Senior career*
Years	Team	Apps	(Gls)
2012	Oklahoma City FC (WPSL)	10	(12)
2013	Houston Aces (WPSL)	9	(5)
2014	Portland Thorns FC	2	(0)
2015	Houston Aces		

International career
2003	United States U16		
- United States U17
2006	Mexico U20	2	
2013	Mexico	1	(0)
- * Club domestic league appearances and goals

Jackie Lynn Acevedo Rangel (born 18 January 1987) is an American-born Mexican former footballer who played as a striker.

== Early life ==
Acevedo was born in Austin, Texas, United States to Mexican parents and has five siblings (Jamie Acevedo, Jenny Acevedo, Alexandria King, Victoria King, and Chancellor King). She attended McNeil High School in Austin and won a Texas State Championship in 2004 with McNeil's soccer team. She then went to college at the University of Tennessee. Acevedo played a single year for the University of Tennessee in 2008 before transferring colleges. Acevedo played for three years for Southern Nazarene University in Oklahoma and was a three-time NAIA All-American. She also was awarded Offensive Player of the Year by the Sooner Athletic Conference in 2010 and 2011. She scored 80 goals, with 31 assists, across her three years at SNU.

== Club career ==
=== Oklahoma City FC ===
In the 2012 WPSL season, Acevedo played for Oklahoma City FC in the WPSL. She made 10 appearances and scored 12 goals, which ranked 3rd in the league for overall points (26).

=== Houston Aces ===
In the 2013 WPSL season, Acevedo earned 9 caps for the Houston Aces, scoring 5 goals with 4 assists. She was named to the All-WPSL Team. The Houston Aces were the runners-up that year, losing in the WPSL Championship.

=== Portland Thorns FC ===
On 3 January 2014, Acevedo was allocated to the NWSL side Portland Thorns FC through the NWSL Allocation process. She was the only change to the Thorns' allocated players after they won the inaugural NWSL Championship.

She made her debut 12 April 2014 against the Houston Dash in the first game of the 2014 NWSL Season. Early in the year, she was speculated to be the likeliest replacement for the then-injured Alex Morgan as Portland's starting striker, but as the year progressed she only made appearances in the first two games of the year. Mexico did not allocate her to the NWSL for the 2015 season.

== International career ==
=== Mexico U-20 Women's National Team ===
Acevedo earned two caps for the team in the 2006 FIFA U-20 Women's World Cup.

=== Mexico Senior Women's National Team ===
Acevedo earned her first international cap for the senior team on 24 November 2013, when she played a friendly against Canada in Vancouver, Canada. She also took part in the 11–20 July 2014 training camp for Mexico National Team in preparation for Mexico's qualifying campaign for the 2015 FIFA Women's World Cup.

== See also ==
- List of Mexico women's international footballers
