= Hanna Terry =

Swedish footballer

Personal information
- Full name: Hanna Elizabeth Terry
- Date of birth: 29 November 1990 (age 35)
- Place of birth: Santa Monica, California, U.S.
- Height: 1.65 m (5 ft 5 in)
- Position: Forward

Team information
- Current team: Røa IL
- Number: 11

College career
Years	Team	Apps	(Gls)
2009	Utah Utes	22	(5)
2011–2013	Northeastern Huskies	61	(7)

Senior career*
Years	Team	Apps	(Gls)
2014–2015	Portland Thorns FC	8	(0)
2016	QBIK	23	(8)
2017	KIF Örebro	18	(4)
2018–2019	Limhamn Bunkeflo	7	(0)
2020–	Røa IL	11	(1)

International career
2013	Sweden U23		
- * Club domestic league appearances and goals as of 30 August 2020

Hanna Elizabeth Terry (born 29 November 1990) is an American-born Swedish professional footballer who plays as a forward for Norwegian club Røa IL. She played for the Portland Thorns FC of the National Women's Soccer League. She has represented the Sweden women's national under-23 football team.

== College career ==
She started her career at the University of Utah before transferring to Northeastern University. She was a three-year starting forward for the Northeastern Huskies from 2011 to 2013. The high-point of her soccer career with the Huskies came when she closed her soccer career in 2013 by leading her team to the Colonial Athletic Association tournament title — where she was named the outstanding player — and a berth in the NCAA tournament. The former Huskies captain wrapped up her collegiate career with seven goals and 14 assists, placing her fourth all-time in program history in assists.

== Club career ==
Hanna Terry signed as a free agent for the Portland Thorns on July 25, 2014. Terry made her Thorns FC debut as an amateur player against the Washington Spirit on June 15 as a second-half substitute. She appeared in her first official match a professional as a second-half substitute July 27 at Seattle Reign FC and ended the season having played in two games.

Terry was on the roster for the 2015 season. On August 21, 2015, the Thorns announce the release of Hanna Terry for unspecified reasons. In her second season for Thorns FC in 2015, Terry, 24, appeared in six matches, logging 131 minutes.

She was waived by the Portland Thorns FC in August 2015.

== International career ==
Terry was selected to represent Sweden in the Women's U23 Four Nation Tournament in La Manga, Spain in February/March 2013. Terry came on as a substitute for the Swedish team in a game v. the USA U-23 team on March 4, 2013.

Terry, whose mother was born in Sweden, holds dual citizenship in both the United States and Sweden. She pursued a spot on the Swedish national team for much of her soccer career, and her placement on the U23 squad was her first international experience.

== Personal life ==
She is the daughter of actor John Terry.
