= Katarina Tarr =

American soccer player

Personal information
- Full name: Katarina Ann Tarr
- Date of birth: April 10, 1987 (age 39)
- Place of birth: Whitefish, Montana, United States
- Height: 1.76 m (5 ft 9 in)
- Position: Defender

College career
Years	Team	Apps	(Gls)
2005–2008	Missouri Tigers	82	(5)

Senior career*
Years	Team	Apps	(Gls)
2006	River Cities		
2007	Ryazan VDV		
2009	Buffalo Flash	14	(1)
2010	Tennis Borussia Berlin	10	(0)
2010–2013	Essen-Schönebeck	43	(3)
2014	Portland Thorns	6	(0)
- * Club domestic league appearances and goals

Katarina Ann Tarr (born April 10, 1987) is a retired American soccer defender who last played for the Portland Thorns FC of the National Women's Soccer League. She previously played for SG Essen-Schönebeck in the German Bundesliga and for WPSL and W-League sides River Cities FC, FC St. Louis and Buffalo Flash.

== Early life ==
Born in Whitefish, Montana, Tarr was raised in Vancouver, Washington. She attended Columbia River High School where she was named an all-league selection four times and was awarded first-team all-state honors three times. Tarr also played for the regional Olympic developmentment program (ODP) team.

Tarr attended the University of Missouri where she played for the Tigers from 2005 to 2008. She earned All-Big 12 second team honors in 2007 and a spot on the 2008 Big 12 All-Tournament Team as the Tigers earned their first-ever conference title. She finished her time at Missouri as the seventh all-time in career games played with 82 and ninth all-time in career games started with 75. As a defender, she scored five goals and served two assists during her collegiate career.

== Playing career ==
=== SGS Essen-Schönebeck, 2010-2012 ===
Tarr played for SG Essen-Schönebeck in the Frauen Bundesliga, the top division league in Germany during the 2010/11 season. She scored 3 goals as a defender during her 20 appearances for the club. The team finished ninth during the regular season with a 5–5–12 record. She returned for the 2011/12 season and started in all seven of the matches in which she played. SGS Essen-Schönebeck finished fifth during the regular season. During the 2012/13 season, Tarr scored 1 goal in her 11 appearances for the club. The club finished in sixth place during the regular season.

=== Portland Thorns, 2014 ===
In April 2014, it was announced that Tarr had signed with the Portland Thorns of the National Women's Soccer League for the 2014 season. She made her first appearance for the club during a match against FC Kansas City on April 26, 2014. Tarr appeared in 6 regular-season matches for the Thorns in 2014 before undergoing knee surgery.
