= Elisabeth Sullivan =

National Women's Soccer League forward

Personal information
- Full name: Elisabeth Morgan Sullivan
- Date of birth: December 28, 1991 (age 34)
- Place of birth: Memphis, Tennessee, United States
- Height: 5 ft 5 in (1.65 m)
- Position: Striker

College career
Years	Team	Apps	(Gls)
2010–2013	Mississippi State Bulldogs		

Senior career*
Years	Team	Apps	(Gls)
2014	Portland Thorns FC	1	(0)
- * Club domestic league appearances and goals

Elisabeth Morgan Sullivan (born December 28, 1991) is an American soccer player who last played as a striker for Portland Thorns FC of the National Women's Soccer League (NWSL).

== Club career ==
Portland Thorns FC drafted Sullivan in 2014.
