= Jessica McDonald =

American soccer player (born 1988)

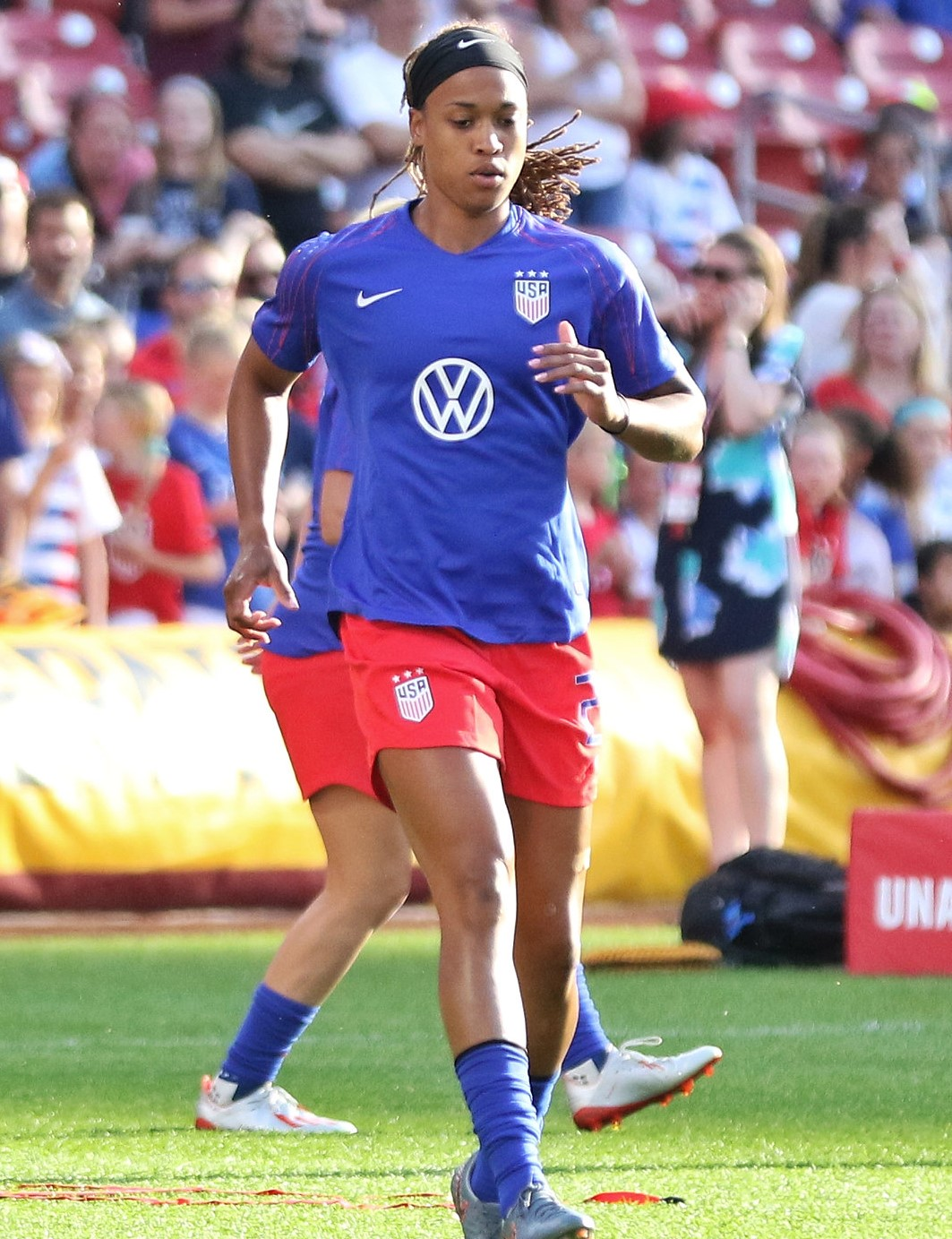
- McDonald before USWNT friendly against New Zealand in May 2019

Personal information
- Full name: Jessica Marie McDonald
- Date of birth: February 28, 1988 (age 38)
- Place of birth: Phoenix, Arizona, United States
- Height: 5 ft 10 in (1.78 m)
- Position: Forward

College career
Years	Team	Apps	(Gls)
2006–2007	Phoenix Bears		
2008–2009	North Carolina Tar Heels		

Senior career*
Years	Team	Apps	(Gls)
2010	Chicago Red Stars	5	(0)
2012–2013	Melbourne Victory	13	(7)
2013	Chicago Red Stars	9	(0)
2013	Seattle Reign FC	7	(3)
2014	Portland Thorns FC	24	(11)
2015	Houston Dash	20	(7)
2016	Western New York Flash	20	(10)
2017–2021	North Carolina Courage	84	(24)
2022–2023	Racing Louisville	26	(3)
2022–2023	→ Western United (loan)	9	(2)

International career^{‡}
- United States U17
2007–2008	United States U20		
2009	United States U23		
2016–2020	United States	19	(4)
Medal record
Women's soccer
Representing the United States
FIFA Women's World Cup
Gold medal – first place	2019 France	Team
Pan American Games
Silver medal – second place	2007 Rio de Janeiro	Team
- * Club domestic league appearances and goals as of February 24, 2023 ‡ National team caps and goals as of March 8, 2020

Jessica Marie McDonald (born February 28, 1988) is an American soccer commentator and former professional player. She played for National Women's Soccer League (NWSL) clubs including the Chicago Red Stars, Seattle Reign, Portland Thorns, Houston Dash, Western New York Flash, North Carolina Courage, and Racing Louisville. During her time with the Flash / Courage, she won three NWSL Shields and three NWSL Championships. She made 19 appearances for the United States national team and was part of the team that won the 2019 FIFA Women's World Cup.

== Early life ==
Born in Phoenix, Arizona, McDonald is the daughter of Traci McDonald and Vince Myers. Her brother, Brandon McDonald, was also a professional soccer player who played in Major League Soccer and for the Guam national team. She attended Cactus High School in Glendale, Arizona, where she played basketball all four years and ran track during her junior and senior years. In 2004 and 2006, she was a member of state championship basketball teams and was a first-team all-state and all-region selection. She was also a state champion and record holder in the 400 meters during her track and field career. She graduated Cactus High School as the school's record holder for the 100 meters, 200 meters, 400 meters, and 4 × 400 meter relay team.

McDonald was a member of the Sereno Soccer club from 2000 to 2007 and helped the team win state championships each year she played for it. She helped lead Sereno to regional championships in 2003 and 2007, and placed second in the national championship in 2003. She played on the Surf Cup title-winning teams in 2005 and 2006. She was the MVP of the tournament in 2006.

=== Phoenix College ===
McDonald attended Phoenix College during her freshman and sophomore year of college where she played soccer, basketball and track and was a member of the honors program. She was named a first-team junior college All-America in soccer and National Junior College Player of the Year. McDonald earned first-team all-conference and all-region honors and was the single-season record holder at Phoenix College for goals and assists. Also continuing to excel at basketball, McDonald earned first-team all-region and all-conference honors and was the country's number one rebounder in junior college and among the Top 30 in scoring.

=== North Carolina Tar Heels ===
After transferring to the University of North Carolina, Chapel Hill during her sophomore year, McDonald joined the North Carolina Tar Heels soccer team during the first half of the 2008 season and helped the squad ultimately win the national championship as a starting striker. McDonald scored 5 goals and had 10 assists for 20 points during the season. Despite playing in only 75 percent of the team's games her first year, she led the squad in assists.

== Club career ==
=== Chicago Red Stars, 2010 ===
In 2010, McDonald was the second pick (fifteenth overall) by the Chicago Red Stars in the 2010 WPS Draft. She made five appearances for the squad before suffering a knee injury that required 18 months recovery. Chicago finished the regular season in sixth place with a 7–11–6 record. Following the season, the team suspended league operations in December 2010 and re-established themselves in the WPSL.

=== Melbourne Victory FC, 2012–13 ===
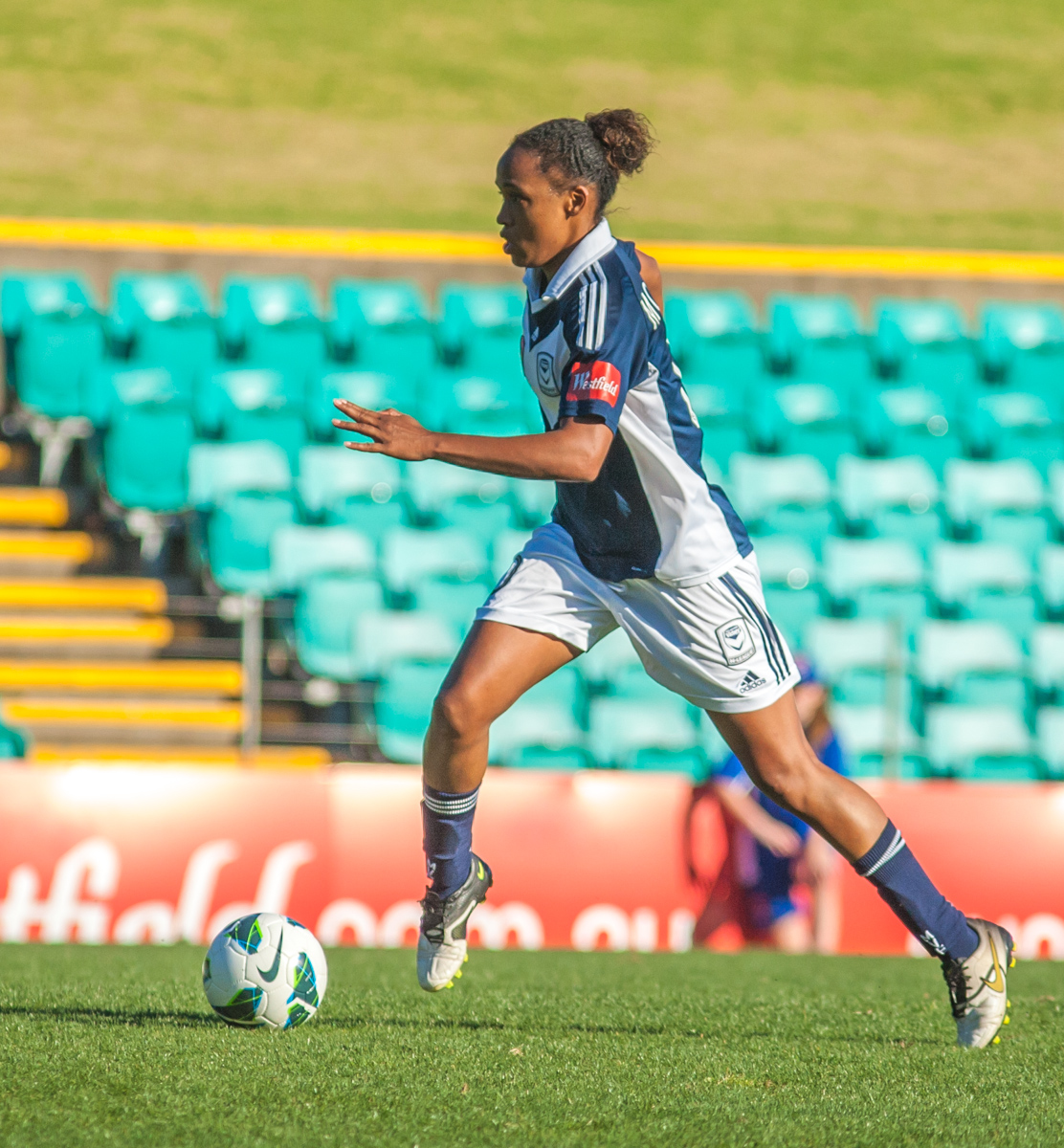
McDonald playing for Melbourne Victory in 2012

McDonald signed with the Melbourne Victory FC in Australia's W-League (now known as A-League Women) for the 2012–13 season. She started all 13 of her appearances for the squad, scoring seven goals, and helped the squad to the Grand Final match against Sydney FC.

=== Chicago Red Stars and Seattle Reign FC, 2013 ===
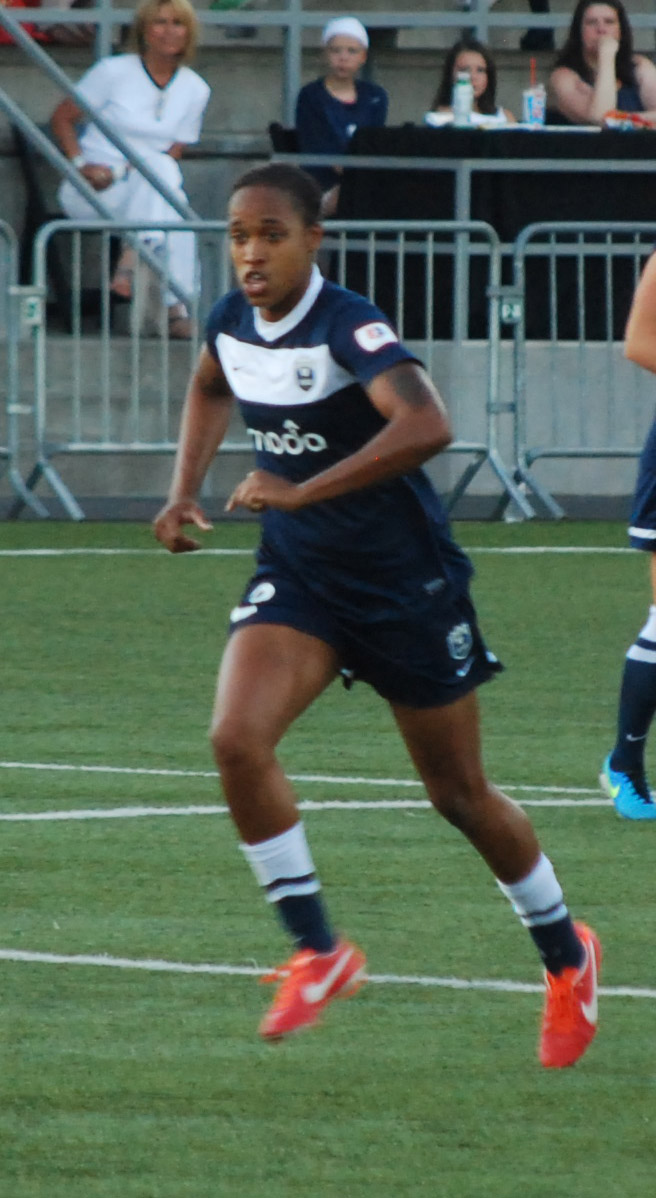
McDonald during a Seattle Reign FC match on July 25, 2013

In 2013, McDonald signed with the Chicago Red Stars as a free agent for the inaugural season of the NWSL. During the pre-season, she scored four goals in the second half of a match against St. Edward's University. She made nine appearances for the Red Stars during the regular season, serving one assist, before being waived by the team in June 2013.

On June 28, 2013, it was announced that McDonald had signed with the Seattle Reign FC after being waived by the Red Stars. She scored her first goal during her debut appearance for the club in a match against the Boston Breakers on July 3, 2013. Two games later, during the team's first televised match on Fox Soccer, she scored a brace against the Washington Spirit leading the Reign to a 2–1 win. McDonald finished the 2013 season with six starts in seven matches played, tallying a total of 439 minutes played. Her three goals ranked third on the squad for most goals scored – tied with teammates, Christine Nairn and Kaylyn Kyle.

=== Portland Thorns, 2014 ===
McDonald was traded to the Portland Thorns along with defender Rebecca Moros in late 2013 under head coach Cindy Parlow Cone, in exchange for Danielle Foxhoven. McDonald was a starting forward for the first eleven games of the 2014 season, then mostly relegated to a substitute position as Alex Morgan returned from an injury. The team-leading scorer for the Thorns in 2014, McDonald had eleven goals, including a July 17 goal 33 seconds in against Chicago: the fastest goal in NWSL history. This would be her only season in Portland, where she played as number 14 for a total of 1310 minutes in 24 regular-season games under head coach Paul Riley.

=== Houston Dash, 2015 ===
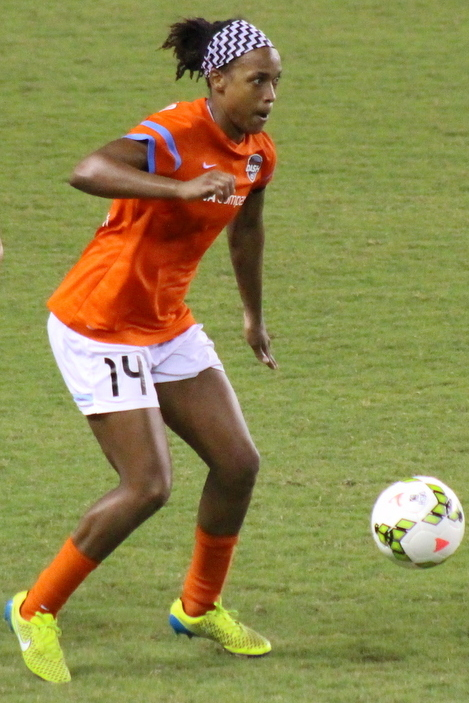
McDonald playing for Houston Dash in 2015

On January 16, 2015, McDonald was traded by the Thorns to the Houston Dash for the 13th pick in the 2015 NWSL College Draft and a second round selection in the 2016 NWSL College Draft. McDonald led the Dash's inaugural season in goals with seven during the 2016 season. She scored the game-winning goal during the team's 1–0 win over her former team the Portland Thorns in May. The Dash finished in fifth place during the regular season with a 6–8–6 record.

=== Western New York Flash, 2016 ===
In January 2016, the Western New York Flash acquired McDonald in a trade that sent two international spots and one 2017 draft pick to Houston. Named Player of the Week for week 10 and to the Second XI list, McDonald finished third in the NWSL overall in goals scored (10), assists(7) shots (61), and second overall in shots on goal (34) for the 2016 season, McDonald earned her first senior team call-up for the USWNT.

=== North Carolina Courage, 2017–2021 ===
It was announced on January 9, 2017, that the Western New York Flash was officially sold to new ownership, moved to North Carolina, and rebranded as the North Carolina Courage. In May 2017, McDonald became the first NWSL player to score 33 regular-season, career goals. She scored 4 goals in 2017, helping North Carolina win the NWSL Shield.

In 2018 McDonald played in 23 regular season games, scoring 7 goals. North Carolina broke the record for most goals scored in a season with 53. In the Semi-final McDonald scored in the 5th minute, which was the fastest goal in playoff history. North Carolina won 2–0 and advanced to their second straight final. McDonald scored twice in the NWSL Championship game as the Courage defeated the Portland Thorns 3–0. She was named Most Valuable Player of the match. This was McDonald's second NWSL Championship.

=== Racing Louisville, 2022–2023 ===
On December 17, 2021, shortly before the NWSL draft, Racing Louisville acquired McDonald's playing rights in a three-way trade with the Courage and Angel City FC. Racing sent Savannah McCaskill to Angel City in exchange for the sixth overall pick in the draft plus $25,000 in allocation money, and then traded the pick to the Courage for McDonald. McDonald signed a two-year contract with Racing on January 28, 2022. She scored her first goal for Racing in a 3–2 loss to the Houston Dash in the NWSL Challenge Cup.

Her Racing Louisville contract expired in November 2023. She retired after that season and became a club ambassador for the North Carolina Courage.

==== Loan to Western United ====
In October 2022, McDonald was loaned to Australian A-League Women club Western United on a three-month guest contract for the start of their inaugural season. She made her debut and scored the club's first goal in a 1–0 victory over reigning champions Melbourne Victory in the first round of the season.

== International career ==
McDonald has represented the United States on several youth national teams including the under-16, under-17, under-20, under-23, and the senior national team squads. In 2007, Jill Ellis named her to the U-20 roster for the 2007 Pan American Games in Brazil. The team won silver after being defeated by Brazil's senior national team 5–0 during the final.

=== 2016 – 2018 ===
She earned her first call up to the senior national team on November 2, 2016, and made her international debut on November 10 against Romania. She was then named to the roster for the 2017 SheBelieves Cup that took place from March 1–7, but she did not appear in any of her team's matches. She was not named to the teams following camp for friendlies against Russia in April.

Following a strong 2018 NWSL season, McDonald was called up to the team in November 2018 for the abroad friendlies vs Portugal and Scotland. She started vs Portugal in Lisbon on November 8, and scored her first international goal, which happened to be the game winner. The 1–0 win gave the senior national team their 500th recorded victory in program history. She appeared as a substitute days later on November 13 in the team's match vs Scotland in Paisley.

=== 2019 ===
In January 2019, McDonald was included in the team's training camp that took place abroad in Algarve, Portugal. She then traveled with the team to France and Spain for two friendlies that took place on January 19 and 22, where she appeared in both matches as a substitute. She was then selected in the team's roster for the 2019 SheBelieves Cup that took place from February 27 – March 5. She scored her second career international goal, via a second half stoppage time header against Belgium on April 7.

=== 2019 FIFA Women's World Cup ===
In May 2019, McDonald was named to the final roster of the United States 23-player squad for the 2019 FIFA Women's World Cup. She made one appearance for the team at the tournament, as a half-time substitute in the team's 3–0 group stage win over Chile on June 16. She did not feature in the team's remaining tournament fixtures. She became a World Cup champion on July 7, 2019, following the team's 2–0 win against the Netherlands in Lyon, France.

== Career statistics ==
=== International goals ===
Scores and results list the United States' goal tally first, score column indicates score after each McDonald goal.

List of international goals scored by Jessica McDonald
No.	Date	Venue	Opponent	Score	Result	Competition	Ref.
1	November 8, 2018	Lisbon, Portugal	Portugal	1–0	1–0	Friendly	
2	April 7, 2019	Los Angeles, California	Belgium	6–0	6–0	Friendly	
3	January 31, 2020	Houston, Texas	Panama	6–0	8–0	Olympic qualifier: Group A	
4	February 4, 2020	Houston, Texas	Costa Rica	5–0	6–0	Olympic qualifier: Group A	

== Personal life ==
McDonald has two sons and a daughter.

== Honors ==
Western New York Flash

- NWSL Champions: 2016

North Carolina Courage

- NWSL Champions: 2018, 2019
- NWSL Shield: 2017, 2018, 2019

United States

- FIFA Women's World Cup: 2019
- CONCACAF Women's Olympic Qualifying Tournament: 2020
- SheBelieves Cup: 2020

Individual

- NWSL Best XI: 2016
- NWSL Second XI: 2014
- NWSL Championship Most Valuable Player: 2018
