= Elizabeth Eddy =

American soccer player (born 1991)

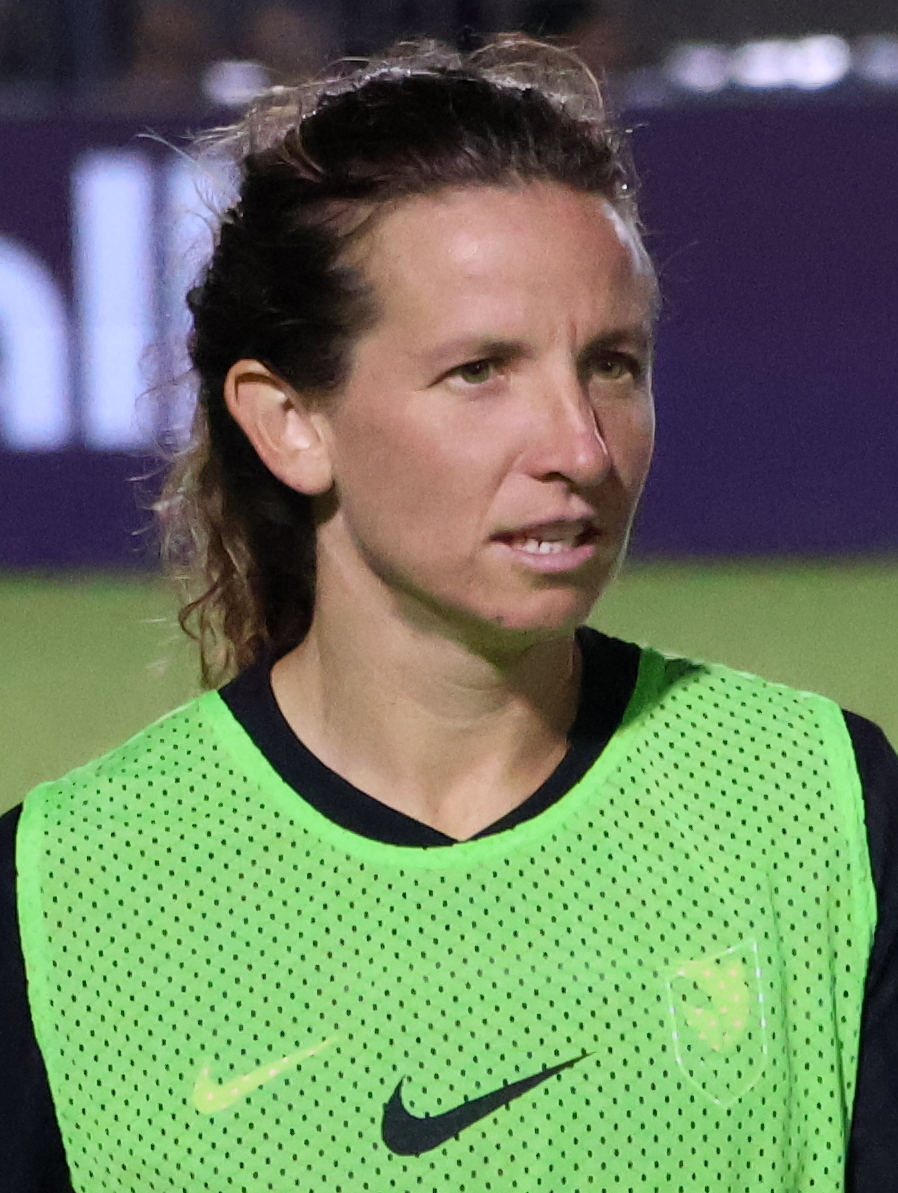
- Eddy with Angel City in 2024

Personal information
- Full name: Elizabeth Hunt Eddy
- Date of birth: September 13, 1991 (age 35)
- Place of birth: Los Angeles, California, U.S.
- Height: 1.65 m (5 ft 5 in)
- Position: Defender

College career
Years	Team	Apps	(Gls)
2010–2013	USC Trojans	77	(16)

Senior career*
Years	Team	Apps	(Gls)
2010–2014	Orange County Blues FC	5	(2)
2015–2016	Western New York Flash	35	(3)
2015	→ Yunogo Belle (loan)	3	(2)
2017–2019	North Carolina Courage	10	(1)
2019–2021	NJ/NY Gotham FC	39	(1)
2020	→ Vittsjö GIK (loan)	11	(2)
2021–2022	→ Newcastle Jets (loan)	14	(2)
2022	Houston Dash	13	(2)
2023–2025	Angel City FC	6	(0)

International career^{‡}
2008	United States U17		
2009–2010	United States U20	1	(0)
- * Club domestic league appearances and goals as of November 11, 2025 ‡ National team caps and goals as of September 15, 2015

Elizabeth Hunt Eddy (born September 13, 1991) is a retired American professional soccer player who played as a defender. Eddy played college soccer for the USC Trojans before spending time with National Women's Soccer League (NWSL) clubs Western New York Flash, North Carolina Courage, NJ/NY Gotham FC, Houston Dash, and Angel City FC.

== Early life ==
Eddy was born in Los Angeles, California. She attended University of Southern California, where she played for the USC lacrosse and soccer teams. She was named Female Trojan of the Year for the 2013–2014 school year.

== Club career ==
After being drafted by Sky Blue FC, Eddy returned to USC for a master's degree. Sky Blue traded her to Western New York Flash, where she signed on May 21, 2015. Following the 2015 regular season, Eddy went on loan to Okayama Yunogo Belle in Japan's Nadeshiko League. She scored two goals in a 3–1 victory over Yamato Sylphid in the second round of the 2015 Empress's Cup.

In June 2019, Eddy was traded by the North Carolina Courage, the successor to the Flash following relocation, to Sky Blue FC. She then spent 2020 on loan with Vittsjö GIK of the Swedish Damallsvenskan before being loaned out to Australian club Newcastle Jets on loan for the 2021–22 A-League Women season.

In March 2022, Gotham FC traded Eddy to the Houston Dash for Houston's natural fourth-round pick in the 2023 NWSL Draft. On June 19, 2022, Eddy scored a brace in three minutes during a 4–3 victory against the North Carolina Courage. The Dash announced on March 20, 2023, that the club had waived Eddy.

On June 30, 2023, Angel City FC signed Eddy to a short-term national team replacement contract which was then extended until the conclusion of the 2023 season. On January 4, 2024, the club announced that Eddy had resigned with them through 2025. Upon the expiration of her contract, Eddy departed from Angel City.

== International career ==
She was part of the United States U17 and United States U20 national team.

== Personal life ==
Eddy is an avid surfer, and surfed frequently while playing soccer in Australia.

Eddy's father Park Eddy had a stroke in July 2022. To support his recovery, the Dash wore armbands bearing his initials during match at Orlando Pride on July 8, 2022.

Eddy wrote an opinion piece published in October 2025 in which she argues for the NWSL to adopt "clear rules about sex and gender eligibility". She was criticized by her teammates, who say "they are hurt and they are harmed by the article, and also they are disgusted by some of the things that were said in the article." Angel City released a statement distancing itself from Eddy's views.

She married Archer Biggs at the end of 2025.

== Honors ==
Orange County Blues FC

- W-League: 2013, 2014

Western New York Flash

- NWSL Championship: 2016

United States U20

- CONCACAF Women's U-20 Championship: 2010
