= Paul Riley (footballer) =

English football coach (born 1963)

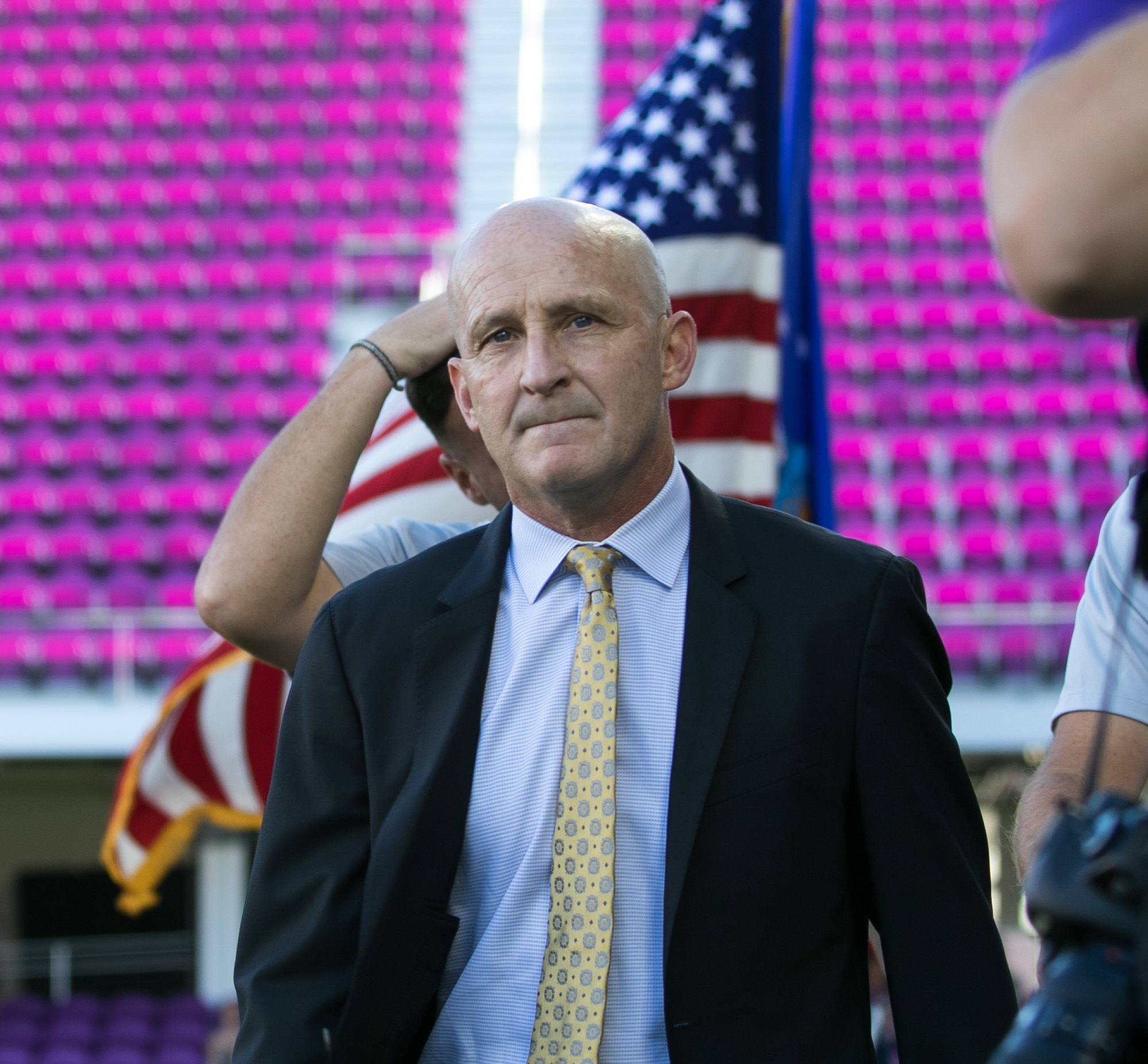

Personal information
- Date of birth: 23 September 1963 (age 63)
- Place of birth: Liverpool, England
- Position: Midfielder

College career
Years	Team	Apps	(Gls)
1982–1985	Adelphi Panthers		

Senior career*
Years	Team	Apps	(Gls)
1988	Albany Capitals		(2)
1989–1990	New Jersey Eagles		
1991	Glen Cove		
1992	Hercules		
1993	New York Atlas		
1994–1997	Long Island Rough Riders		

Managerial career
- 1986–1989: CW Post (assistant)
- 1990–1997: CW Post
- 1997–2003: Long Island Rough Riders
- 2006–2009: Long Island Fury
- 2010–2011: Philadelphia Independence
- 2012–2013: New York Fury
- 2014–2015: Portland Thorns
- 2016: Western New York Flash
- 2017–2021: North Carolina Courage
- * Club domestic league appearances and goals

Paul Riley (born 23 September 1963) is an English former football player and coach.

He spent his entire professional playing career in American leagues, including the American Professional Soccer League and the USISL. He has been a coach, mostly of women's teams, since the 1990s. In 2021, he was accused of sexual misconduct and mistreatment of players that spanned over a 10-year coaching period in the National Women's Soccer League and its predecessors. In January 2023, following an investigation conducted jointly by the NWSL and its players’ union, Riley was permanently banned from coaching in the league.

== Playing career ==
=== Youth ===
In 1982, Riley came to the United States to attend Adelphi University. From 1982 to 1985, he played on the Adelphi Panthers men's soccer team. In 1999, Adelphi inducted Riley into the school's Hall of Fame.

=== Club career ===
After graduation, Riley became a manager, but in 1988, he turned professional when he joined the Albany Capitals of the American Soccer League. The Capitals did not renew his contract at the end of the season and Riley moved to the New Jersey Eagles for the 1989 and 1990 season. In 1990, the Eagles played in the American Professional Soccer League which had been formed by the merger of the American Soccer League and the Western Soccer League. Riley was 1989 All League and 1990 Second Team All League. In 1991, Riley moved down to Glen Cove of the New England Professional Soccer League. Glen Cove won the league championship as Riley was named MVP. In 1992, he again moved, this time to Hercules, again winning the NEPSL title. In 1993, he played for New York Atlas. In 1994, Riley returned to professional soccer with the expansion Long Island Rough Riders of the USISL. In 1995, Riley and his teammates won the league title. When he retired at the end of the 1997 season, Riley held the team's all-time career record for assists.

== Coaching career ==
In 1986, Riley began his coaching career when CW Post hired him as an assistant. He was the head trainer for the Albertson Soccer League in the 1990's. In 1990, Riley became head coach at CW Post, a position he held until 1997. Over his eight seasons as head coach, he compiled an 88–49–13 record. In 1997, Riley became the head coach of the Long Island Rough Riders, in addition to his duties as a player with the Rough Riders and head coach of CW Post. In 1999, Riley was named the USISL A-League Coach of the Year. In 2002, the Rough Riders moved down to the USL D3 Pro League, winning the league championship that season. His last season with the Rough Riders came in 2003. Over the years, Riley was involved with the Albertson Fury Soccer Club. In 2006, Riley became the head coach of the Long Island Fury of the Women's Premier Soccer League. The Fury was part of the Albertson Fury Soccer Club. Riley coached the Fury through the 2008 season. In September 2009, the Philadelphia Independence of Women's Professional Soccer hired Riley as the team's first coach. Riley was selected as the 2010 WPS Coach of the Year. In 2011, he took the team to the championship where they fell in penalties to the Western New York Flash. Riley was also named 2011 WPS Coach of the Year.

On 12 March 2012, following the collapse of WPS, Riley was named head coach of the New York Fury in the Women's Premier Soccer League.

In 2013, Riley was named head coach of the Portland Thorns in the newly formed top-division National Women's Soccer League. After leading the team to a 16–17–11 record and one playoff appearance over two seasons, but finishing the 2015 season in sixth place, the Thorns declined to renew Riley's contract.

On 19 February 2016, Riley was announced as the head coach of the WNY Flash of the National Women's Soccer League.

On 9 January 2017, the National Women's Soccer League announced that the WNY Flash franchise would be relocated to North Carolina. Riley was officially hired as head coach of the relocated club, now called the North Carolina Courage, on 30 January.

The Courage finished in first place during the 2017 regular season with a 16–7–1 record, winning the NWSL Shield and advanced to the Playoffs. The game that clinched the NWSL Shield for the Courage was a 4–0 win over Houston Dash. In 2018 North Carolina finished in first place and won the NWSL Shield for the second consecutive season with a 17–1–6 record. On 22 September, the Courage won the NWSL Championship 3–0 over the Portland Thorns, the first time the Courage had won the title.

In the 2019 season, the Courage finished in first place with a 15–5–4 record, winning the NWSL Shield for the third consecutive season. After defeating Reign FC 4–1 in the semi-finals, the Courage won their second NWSL Championship shutting out the Chicago Red Stars 4–0 in the final.

=== Misconduct allegations ===
A September 2021 report by The Athletic alleged that Riley had sexually coerced and verbally abused players on his teams, specifically during the time period between 2011 and 2015 (consisting of his time in WPS, WPSL, and NWSL). In the article, Riley denied the allegations. The article also stated that NWSL failed to act on Riley's alleged abuses multiple times, including earlier in 2021 when the league declined to act on an offer from two of Riley's alleged victims to assist in investigating Riley's alleged abuses.

On 30 September 2021, the Courage announced that Riley had been fired due to "very serious allegations of misconduct". The Portland Thorns released a statement the same day citing that some of the incidents occurred during Riley's two-year tenure as head coach of the Thorns in 2015 and discussing their reaction to the incidents at the time.

On 1 October 2021, FIFA announced they were opening an investigation into the allegations. The United States Soccer Federation suspended Riley's coaching license the same day. Concurrently, NWSL games were canceled that weekend and NWSL commissioner Lisa Baird (who had stated she was referring the matter to the United States Center for SafeSport for investigation) and general counsel Lisa Levin resigned. On 3 October, the US federation also hired former acting United States Attorney General Sally Yates to investigate the claims, and the NWSL and its players' union launched a parallel investigation around that time.

On January 9, 2023, following the release of a joint report, Riley received a lifetime ban from the NWSL due to substantiated findings of misconduct.

== Honours ==
=== Manager ===
Long Island Rough Riders

- USISL D-3 Pro League: 2002

Western New York Flash

- National Women's Soccer League: 2016

North Carolina Courage

- National Women's Soccer League: 2018, 2019
- NWSL Shield: 2017, 2018, 2019

Individual

- WPS Coach of the Year: 2010, 2011
- NWSL Coach of the Year: 2017, 2018
