= NWSL federation players =

NWSL player salary category (2013–2021)

The National Women's Soccer League (NWSL) federation players were players whose salaries for playing in the National Women's Soccer League were paid for by their respective national federations from 2013 to 2021. American federation players were contracted to the United States Soccer Federation (USSF) and not to their respective NWSL clubs, whereas Canadian federation players were contracted directly to their respective NWSL clubs. Federation players were sometimes known as allocated players, allocation players, or subsidized players, which occasionally created confusion with players paid using NWSL allocation money, a mechanism introduced before the 2020 NWSL season.

NWSL federation players originally came from the USSF, the Canadian Soccer Association (CSA), and the Mexican Football Federation (FMF), and they were distributed to the eight founding teams of the NWSL through a player allocation process in January 2013. The FMF ceased allocating players to the NWSL in 2016 before starting its own national professional league, Liga MX Femenil, in 2017.

At the end of the 2021 NWSL season, the USSF announced that the federation player system would be abolished. In 2021, the last season in which the federation player system was in place in the NWSL, each American federation player counted as $33,000 and each Canadian federation player $27,500 against the NWSL team salary cap.

== 2013 ==
=== Allocation process ===
For the initial allocation, each of the eight teams submitted which players they desired, ranking all players in each national team pool, and all the eligible players submitted which four teams they wanted to play for, as well as one team they didn't. The results were then matched by a third party.

The initial player allocation was held on January 9, 2013, with each team's allocation announced on January 11. The USSF initially chose to fund 23 player salaries, while CSA and FMF both funded 16 players. Each team, except for the Western New York Flash, received three U.S., two Canadian, and two Mexican internationals; the Flash received two U.S. internationals.

=== Allocation results ===
	Boston Breakers	Chicago Red Stars	FC Kansas City	Portland Thorns	Seattle Reign FC	Sky Blue FC	Washington Spirit	Western New York Flash
(United States)	Sydney Leroux	Shannon Boxx	Nicole Barnhart	Rachel Buehler	Megan Rapinoe	Jillian Loyden	Ashlyn Harris	Carli Lloyd
(United States)	Heather Mitts	Amy LePeilbet	Lauren Cheney	Tobin Heath	Amy Rodriguez	Kelley O'Hara	Ali Krieger	Abby Wambach
(United States)	Heather O'Reilly	Keelin Winters*	Becky Sauerbrunn	Alex Morgan	Hope Solo	Christie Rampone	Lori Lindsey	
(Canada)	Adriana Leon*	Erin McLeod	Desiree Scott	Karina LeBlanc	Kaylyn Kyle	Sophie Schmidt	Robyn Gayle	Bryanna McCarthy
(Canada)	Rhian Wilkinson	Carmelina Moscato*	Lauren Sesselmann	Christine Sinclair	Emily Zurrer	Melanie Booth	Diana Matheson	Jodi-Ann Robinson
(Mexico)	Anisa Guajardo	Maribel Dominguez	Renae Cuellar*	Luz Saucedo	Jenny Ruiz	Mónica Ocampo	Alina Garciamendez	Verónica Pérez
(Mexico)	Cecilia Santiago	Dinora Garza	Marylin Diaz	Rubi Sandoval	Teresa Noyola*	Lydia Rangel	Teresa Worbis	Pamela Tajonar

Italic designates players who did not participate in the season
* designates player who was traded during the season

=== Player withdrawals ===
Heather Mitts retired before the season started, Amy LePeilbet was out with injury all summer, and Amy Rodriguez took the season off due to pregnancy.

In the month leading up to opening day, the FMF withdrew funding for several of its players, removing them from the NWSL:

- Marylin Diaz and Luz Saucedo – failed fitness tests
- Rubi Sandoval – reportedly injured
- Alina Garciamendez – had existing contract with FFC Frankfurt

=== Other post-allocation changes ===
On March 1, Chicago sent Winters and a fourth-round 2014 draft pick to Seattle in exchange for a first-round 2014 draft pick and a return of one of Seattle's allocated players to Chicago after the season was complete. It was later revealed that Seattle would not send an allocated player to Chicago, with Winters losing her allocation status and Chicago getting a new allocated player.

On July 1, Kansas City traded Renae Cuellar and their third-round pick to Seattle in exchange for Teresa Noyola, right to Nikki Krzysik, and a second-round draft pick. Cuellar had been a league-leading scorer until she had an injury and was unable to return to KC's starting lineup even after fully recovering.

On July 30, Chicago and Boston swapped Adriana Leon and Carmelina Moscato.

Kristie Mewis of FC Kansas City gained allocated status during the 2013 season.

=== Offseason changes ===
All three federations re-evaluated their allocations during the 2013–2014 offseason. Teams made trades with their allocated players often before the allocations were announced, though. There were four offseason trades before new allocations were officially announced, all involving the Seattle Reign. On September 10, Carmelina Moscato was sent from Boston to Seattle in exchange for Kaylyn Kyle. On October 25, Washington gave the rights to Alina Garciamendez (and to Nikki Marshall) to Seattle in exchange for Renae Cuellar (and rights to Jodie Taylor). Third-round 2014 draft picks were also traded. Third, Seattle sent Amy Rodriguez to FCKC in exchange for Kristie Mewis. Finally, on November 18, Seattle gave away Mewis, Michelle Betos, and their first two 2015 draft picks to the Boston Breakers in exchange for Sydney Leroux.

== 2014 ==
The new allocation list was revealed on January 3. Despite the addition of the expansion side Houston Dash, Canada did not increase their allocation to 18 players; Mexico decreased their allocation from 16 (effectively 12) to 8, similarly not accounting for the ninth team, and unlike Canada or the United States did not as a rule keep returning allocated players on their existing teams. The United States increased their allocation from 23 to 26 players. The Houston Dash were only allocated one US player but was allowed to take two more in the 2014 NWSL Expansion Draft.

=== Allocation results ===
	Boston Breakers	Chicago Red Stars	FC Kansas City	Houston Dash	Portland Thorns	Seattle Reign FC	Sky Blue FC	Washington Spirit	WNY Flash
(United States)	Heather O'Reilly	Shannon Boxx	Nicole Barnhart	Whitney Engen †	Rachel Buehler	Megan Rapinoe	Jillian Loyden	Ashlyn Harris	Carli Lloyd
(United States)	Meghan Klingenberg* †	Amy LePeilbet*	Lauren Holiday		Tobin Heath	Hope Solo	Kelley O'Hara	Ali Krieger	Abby Wambach
(United States)	Kristie Mewis	Christen Press †	Becky Sauerbrunn		Alex Morgan	Stephanie Cox †	Christie Rampone	Yael Averbuch †	
(United States)			Amy Rodriguez			Sydney Leroux			
(Canada)	Kaylyn Kyle	Erin McLeod*	Desiree Scott	Melissa Tancredi* †	Karina LeBlanc*	Carmelina Moscato	Sophie Schmidt	Robyn Gayle	Selenia Iacchelli †
(Canada)	Chelsea Stewart †	Adriana Leon	Lauren Sesselmann*		Christine Sinclair		Jonelle Filigno †	Diana Matheson	
(Canada)		Rachel Quon †							
(Mexico)	Dinora Garza		Cecilia Santiago	Teresa Noyola	Jackie Acevedo †	Arianna Romero* †	Mónica Ocampo	Renae Cuellar	Verónica Pérez*

Highlight designates difference from previous allocation
† designates newly allocated player for 2014
Italic designates a player that did not participate in the season
* designates player who was traded during the season OR selected in the expansion draft

=== Post-allocation changes ===
The Houston Dash were very quick to get into the trading arena, sending Melissa Tancredi to Chicago in exchange for Erin McLeod on January 7. They then selected Meghan Klingenberg, Lauren Sesselmann, and Arianna Romero in the expansion draft.

After the expansion draft, the trade limitation of allocated-for-same-country-allocated was lifted. Players that were 'unevenly' traded once this restriction was lifted include Amy LePeilbet (to Kansas City), Karina LeBlanc (to Chicago), and Verónica Pérez (to Washington).

When rosters were revealed on April 7, Crystal Dunn and Alyssa Naeher had received allocation status.

=== Offseason changes ===
Some allocated players were traded between teams before the new 2015 allocations were announced. The Western New York Flash dealt Carli Lloyd to the Houston Dash in exchange for Whitney Engen (and Becky Edwards). The Boston Breakers also traded Heather O'Reilly to FC Kansas City in exchange for unallocated rookies Morgan Marlborough and Kassey Kallman. Sophie Schmidt announced in January she would not play for Sky Blue FC nor the NWSL in order to focus on the 2015 FIFA Women's World Cup.

== 2015 ==
Official allocation results for all three federations were announced on January 14, 2015, reducing the total number of allocated players to 42 (down from 50 in 2014 and 55 in 2013). Allocated players will play the first 3-4 NWSL games of the 2015 season before missing 7-8 games due to the 2015 FIFA Women's World Cup.

=== Allocation results ===
	Boston Breakers	Chicago Red Stars	FC Kansas City	Houston Dash	Portland Thorns	Seattle Reign FC	Sky Blue FC	Washington Spirit	WNY Flash
(United States)	Kristie Mewis	Shannon Boxx	Nicole Barnhart	Meghan Klingenberg	Rachel Buehler	Sydney Leroux*	Kelley O'Hara	Ashlyn Harris	Abby Wambach*
(United States)	Alyssa Naeher	Christen Press	Lauren Holiday	Carli Lloyd	Tobin Heath	Megan Rapinoe	Christie Rampone	Ali Krieger	Whitney Engen
(United States)		Julie Johnston †	Amy Rodriguez		Alex Morgan	Hope Solo		Crystal Dunn	
(United States)			Becky Sauerbrunn						
(United States)			Heather O'Reilly						
(Canada)	Nkem Ezurike †	Adriana Leon		Erin McLeod	Christine Sinclair		Jonelle Filigno	Diana Matheson	
(Canada)		Rachel Quon		Lauren Sesselmann	Kaylyn Kyle				
(Canada)		Karina LeBlanc		Allysha Chapman †	Rhian Wilkinson †				
(Canada)		Melissa Tancredi							
(Mexico)	Bianca Sierra †						Mónica Ocampo	Verónica Pérez	
(Mexico)								Arianna Romero	

Highlight designates difference from previous allocation
† designates newly allocated player for 2015
Italic designates a player that did not participate in the season
* designates player who was traded during the season

=== Post-allocation changes ===
Abby Wambach announced on March 18 she would not play for Western New York nor the NWSL in order to focus on the 2015 FIFA Women's World Cup. On March 30 Western New York traded Wambach, Amber Brooks, and their 2016 first round draft pick to Seattle for Sydney Leroux and Amanda Frisbie.

=== Offseason changes ===
After the Women's World Cup, many allocated players announced or discussed their plans to retire from national and club football. Shannon Boxx did not finished the season NWSL season with her club; Lauren Holiday and Karina LeBlanc did. Abby Wambach, who passed on the entire 2015 season, officially announced her retirement the day the USWNT visited the White House as part of their 2015 World Cup victory celebrations.

During the offseason, several trades took place to move allocated players, with Chicago and WNY swapping Whitney Engen and Adriana Leon for Chicago to further trade with Boston, swapping Engen for Alyssa Naeher. WNY also sent Sydney Leroux to Kansas City after it was announced that Amy Rodriguez would miss the 2016 season to have her second child.

In addition, several allocated players swapped teams as part of the expansion of the Orlando Pride into the league. Portland sent Alex Morgan and Kaylyn Kyle to Orlando as part of a trade that included them receiving Meghan Klingenberg from Orlando after Orlando selected Klingenberg (and Orlando native Ashlyn Harris) in the 2015 NWSL Expansion Draft.

== 2016 ==
Before the 2016 season, the Mexican Football Federation (FMF) announced that it would no longer allocate players to the NWSL, citing a lack of playing time. None of Mexico's allocated players had played during the 2015 NWSL season.

Primary allocation results for United States players were announced on January 13, 2016, with 24 allocated players. Two days later, during the 2016 NWSL College Draft, NWSL also announced a new allocation process. Canada's allocation list was released with 11 players on February 8, 2016, all of whom were allocated under the old process.

=== Primary allocation results ===
	Boston Breakers	Chicago Red Stars	FC Kansas City	Houston Dash	Orlando Pride	Portland Thorns	Seattle Reign FC	Sky Blue FC	Washington Spirit	WNY Flash
(United States)	Whitney Engen	Alyssa Naeher	Sydney Leroux	Morgan Brian	Ashlyn Harris	Meghan Klingenberg	Hope Solo	Kelley O'Hara	Crystal Dunn	Jaelene Hinkle †
(United States)		Christen Press	Heather O'Reilly	Carli Lloyd	Alex Morgan	Tobin Heath	Megan Rapinoe	Christie Rampone	Ali Krieger	Samantha Mewis †
(United States)		Julie Johnston	Amy Rodriguez			Lindsey Horan †				
(United States)			Becky Sauerbrunn							
(Canada)			Desiree Scott †	Janine Beckie †	Josée Belanger †	Christine Sinclair			Diana Matheson	Adriana Leon
(Canada)				Allysha Chapman	Kaylyn Kyle				Stephanie Labbé †	Sabrina D'Angelo †
(Canada)									Shelina Zadorsky †	

Highlight designates difference from previous allocation
† designates newly allocated player for 2016
Italic designates a player that did not participate in the season
* designates player who was traded during the season

(†) Emily Sonnett was also declared as an allocated player but would be subject to the 2016 NWSL College Draft, where she was selected by Portland Thorns FC with the first overall pick.

=== Unattached allocation order and results ===
Full details for the new process, officially termed Player Distribution, were revealed in late March a day before nine previously allocated players were to have their rights dispersed to other teams. This new process, while first implemented for the 2016 Dispersal Draft, was rumored to have been finalized in time for Mallory Pugh to potential turn professional for the Portland Thorns.

In an effort to create a "equitable mechanism" of distributing players, federations can declare player(s) currently unattached to NWSL clubs to be allocation-eligible, at which point the NWSL have the opportunity to roster said player(s) on a rolling basis. Players that have lost their allocation and are not picked up by their previous team are also eligible for distribution. The distribution ranking order is determined by the previous season's finishing order (including playoffs) with expansion teams being granted the final spots in the order (i.e. after the defending champions). This order can only be changed by trades or when a team decides to accept a new player.

For the 2016 season, the new distribution process proceeded as follows:

Final Ranking	Used Ranking	Previous Ranking	Original Ranking	Club	Date allocation used	Player	Previous club	Ref
–	1	–	1	Boston Breakers	January 15, 2016	trade		
1	–	4	-	Portland Thorns				
2	–	–	2	Sky Blue FC				
3	–	–	3	Western New York Flash				
–	4	–	4	Portland Thorns	January 15, 2016	trade		
4	-	1	-	Boston Breakers				
5	-	–	5	Houston Dash				
6	-	–	6	Washington Spirit				
7	-	–	7	Chicago Red Stars				
–	8	–	8	Seattle Reign	March 31, 2016	Arianna Romero	Washington Spirit; ÍBV	
8	-	–	9	FC Kansas City				
9	-	–	10	Orlando Pride				
–	10	8	-	Seattle Reign	March 31, 2016	Verónica Pérez	Washington Spirit; Canberra United; KIF Örebro DFF	
10	–	10	-	Seattle Reign				

=== Offseason changes ===
- Alex Morgan to Lyon
- Heather O'Reilly to Arsenal L.F.C.
- Crystal Dunn to Chelsea L.F.C.
- Ali Kreiger to Orlando
- Diana Matheson to Seattle
- Allysha Chapman to Boston

== 2017 ==
NWSL switched from referring to "allocated players" to referring to "subsidized players" this season, as a result of the new subsidization process and evidenced when Canada announced its list of subsidized players on January 25, 2017. The list of 22 United States subsidized players was announced on April 6, 2017, the day after a new USWNT Collective Bargaining Agreement (CBA) was announced.

=== Previously-attached subsidized players ===
	Boston Breakers	Chicago Red Stars	FC Kansas City	Houston Dash	NC Courage	Orlando Pride	Portland Thorns	Seattle Reign FC	Sky Blue FC	Washington Spirit
(United States)	Rose Lavelle †	Alyssa Naeher	Sydney Leroux	Morgan Brian	Lynn Williams †	Ashlyn Harris	Meghan Klingenberg	Megan Rapinoe	Kelley O'Hara	Mallory Pugh ‡ *
(United States)		Christen Press	Becky Sauerbrunn	Carli Lloyd	Samantha Mewis	Alex Morgan	Tobin Heath			
(United States)		Julie Ertz	Amy Rodriguez			Ali Krieger	Lindsey Horan			
(United States)		Casey Short †					Emily Sonnett			
(United States)							Allie Long †			
(Canada)	Allysha Chapman		Desiree Scott	Janine Beckie	Sabrina D'Angelo		Christine Sinclair	Diana Matheson	Kailen Sheridan †	Shelina Zadorsky
(Canada)				Nichelle Prince †						Stephanie Labbé

Highlight designates difference from previous list
† designates newly subsidized player whose rights were already held or acquired through the 2017 NWSL College Draft (i.e. avoiding the newly subsidized player distribution process)
‡ designates player new to NWSL added through unattached distribution order process
Italic designates a player that did not participate in the season
* designates player who was traded or changed status during the season

=== Unattached distribution order and results ===
For the 2017 season, the new distribution process proceeded as follows:

Current Ranking	Used/Traded Ranking	Previous Ranking	Original Ranking	Club	Date Selection Used	Player	Previous club	Ref
–	1	–	1	Boston Breakers	November 17, 2016	trade to Spirit		
–	1	2	-	Washington Spirit	May 13, 2017	Mallory Pugh	UCLA	
–	2	–	2	Orlando Pride	November 1, 2016	trade to Spirit		
–	2	9	-	Washington Spirit	November 17, 2016	trade to Breakers		
1	–	1	-	Boston Breakers				
2	–	–	3	Houston Dash				
3	–	–	4	Sky Blue FC				
4	–	–	5	FC Kansas City				
5	–	–	6	Seattle Reign FC				
6	–	–	7	Chicago Red Stars				
7	–	–	8	Portland Thorns FC				
–	9	–	9	Washington Spirit	November 1, 2016	trade to Pride		
8	–	2	-	Orlando Pride				
9	–	–	10	North Carolina Courage				
10	1	2	-	Washington Spirit				

== 2018 ==
=== Federation players ===
Federation players for the 2018 NWSL season were announced on February 15, 2018. There are 34 players from the United States and Canada total, including six new players, on the federation player list.

	Chicago Red Stars	Houston Dash	North Carolina Courage	Orlando Pride	Portland Thorns FC	Seattle Reign FC	Sky Blue FC	Utah Royals FC	Washington Spirit
(United States)	Julie Ertz	Jane Campbell †	Abby Dahlkemper †	Ashlyn Harris	Tobin Heath	Allie Long	Carli Lloyd	Kelley O'Hara	Rose Lavelle
(United States)	Alyssa Naeher	Christen Press *	Crystal Dunn †	Alex Morgan	Lindsey Horan	Megan Rapinoe		Amy Rodriguez	Mallory Pugh
(United States)	Casey Short		Samantha Mewis		Emily Sonnett			Becky Sauerbrunn	Taylor Smith †
(United States)			Lynn Williams						
(Canada)		Nichelle Prince	Allysha Chapman	Shelina Zadorsky	Christine Sinclair		Janine Beckie	Diana Matheson	Quinn (Note: Then known as Quinn) †
(Canada)			Sabrina D'Angelo				Adriana Leon* †	Desiree Scott	
(Canada)							Kailen Sheridan		

Highlight designates difference from previous list
† designates new federation player whose rights were already held or acquired (i.e. avoiding the newly subsidized player distribution process)
‡ designates player new to NWSL added through unattached distribution order process
Italic designates a player that did not participate in the season
* designates player who was traded or changed status during the season

=== In-season changes ===
Christen Press was traded from the Chicago Red Stars to the Houston Dash during the 2018 NWSL College Draft and was subsequently allocated to the Dash, but did not report to the team. She instead signed a short-term contract with Kopparbergs/Göteborg FC and played part of the 2018 Damallsvenskan season in Sweden.

On June 18, the Utah Royals acquired Press's rights from Houston in a three-team trade, and she joined the team later that month, before the scheduled end of her contract with Göteborg.

On May 9, the Houston Dash acquired Allysha Chapman from the North Carolina Courage.

On June 12, Adriana Leon was traded from Sky Blue FC (who had acquired her in the 2018 NWSL Dispersal Draft) to Seattle Reign FC.

On August 9, Janine Beckie signed a one-year deal with Manchester City of the FA Women's Super League.

=== Offseason changes ===
Four American players — Jane Campbell, Amy Rodriguez, Taylor Smith, and Lynn Williams — were no longer federation players after the 2018 NWSL season.

Several Canadian players left the NWSL during the offseason. Sabrina D'Angelo signed for Swedish club Vittsjö GIK, Adriana Leon for English club West Ham United, and Quinn for French club Paris FC.

After leaving the NWSL in 2017, Canadian goalkeeper Stephanie Labbé returned to the league prior to the 2019 season and was allocated to the North Carolina Courage. Canada had previously allocated Labbé to the Washington Spirit.

== 2019 ==
=== Federation players ===
A list of 22 United States federation players for the NWSL season was published first published on March 4, 2019. The NWSL officially confirmed the USWNT list, along with nine Canadian federation players, on April 5, 2019.

	Chicago Red Stars	Houston Dash	North Carolina Courage	Orlando Pride	Portland Thorns FC	Reign FC	Sky Blue FC	Utah Royals FC	Washington Spirit
(United States)	Morgan Brian †		Abby Dahlkemper	Ashlyn Harris	Adrianna Franch †	Allie Long	Carli Lloyd	Kelley O'Hara	Rose Lavelle
(United States)	Julie Ertz		Crystal Dunn	Alex Morgan	Tobin Heath	Megan Rapinoe		Christen Press	Mallory Pugh
(United States)	Alyssa Naeher		Samantha Mewis		Lindsey Horan			Becky Sauerbrunn	
(United States)	Casey Short		McCall Zerboni †		Emily Sonnett				
(Canada)		Allysha Chapman	Stephanie Labbé †	Shelina Zadorsky	Christine Sinclair		Kailen Sheridan	Diana Matheson	
(Canada)		Nichelle Prince						Desiree Scott	
(Canada)		Sophie Schmidt †							

Highlight designates difference from previous list
† designates new federation player whose rights were already held or acquired (i.e. avoiding the newly subsidized player distribution process)
‡ designates player new to NWSL added through unattached distribution order process
Italic designates a player that did not participate in the season
* designates player who was traded or changed status during the season

== 2020 ==
=== Federation players ===
The list of 23 American and 9 Canadian federation players for the 2020 NWSL season was released on February 20, 2020; McCall Zerboni was the only player removed from the previous season. Tierna Davidson was added to the list for the first time and Ali Krieger was restored after last being on the list in 2017; Mallory Pugh and Emily Sonnett had been traded to new teams before the list was announced.

	Chicago Red Stars	Houston Dash	North Carolina Courage	OL Reign	Orlando Pride	Portland Thorns FC	Sky Blue FC	Utah Royals FC	Washington Spirit
(United States)	Morgan Brian		Abby Dahlkemper	Allie Long	Ashlyn Harris	Adrianna Franch	Carli Lloyd	Kelley O'Hara	Rose Lavelle*
(United States)	Tierna Davidson†		Crystal Dunn	Megan Rapinoe	Ali Krieger†	Tobin Heath*	Mallory Pugh	Christen Press*	
(United States)	Julie Ertz		Sam Mewis*		Alex Morgan*	Lindsey Horan		Becky Sauerbrunn*	
(United States)	Alyssa Naeher				Emily Sonnett*				
(United States)	Casey Short								
(Canada)		Allysha Chapman	Steph Labbé		Shelina Zadorsky*	Christine Sinclair	Kailen Sheridan	Diana Matheson	
(Canada)		Nichelle Prince						Desiree Scott	
(Canada)		Sophie Schmidt							

Highlight designates difference from previous list
† designates new federation player whose rights were already held or acquired (i.e. avoiding the newly subsidized player distribution process)
‡ designates player new to NWSL added through unattached distribution order process
Italic designates a player that did not participate in the season
* designates player who was traded or changed status during the season

=== In-season changes ===
On March 3, 2020, Utah Royals FC traded defender Becky Sauerbrunn to Portland Thorns FC.

On August 10, 2020, midfielder Sam Mewis signed with Manchester City; North Carolina Courage retains her NWSL rights if she returns to the league.

On August 16, 2020, Washington Spirit traded midfielder Rose Lavelle to OL Reign. Lavelle signed with Manchester City two days later, but OL Reign retains her NWSL rights if she returns to the league.

On August 18, 2020, defender Emily Sonnett signed with Göteborg; Orlando Pride retains her NWSL rights if she returns to the league.

On August 20, 2020, Orlando Pride loaned defender Shelina Zadorsky to Tottenham Hotspur until December 31, 2020, with Tottenham having the option to make the move permanent.

On September 9, 2020, Tobin Heath and Christen Press signed with Manchester United; their former clubs, Portland Thorns FC and Utah Royals FC, retain their respective NWSL rights if they return to the league.

On September 12, 2020, Alex Morgan signed with Tottenham Hotspur; Orlando Pride retains her NWSL rights if she returns to the league.

=== Offseason changes ===
On October 22, 2020, North Carolina Courage traded Crystal Dunn to Portland Thorns FC via OL Reign.

On November 12, 2020, Racing Louisville FC selected Tobin Heath and Christen Press in the 2020 NWSL Expansion Draft; Louisville will hold their NWSL rights if they return to the league.

On December 2, 2020, Utah Royals FC traded Kelley O'Hara to the Washington Spirit.

On December 21, 2020, Steph Labbé left North Carolina Courage to sign with Swedish club FC Rosengård.

On December 24, 2020, Washington Spirit acquired the rights to Emily Sonnett from Orlando Pride.

On December 29, 2020, Sky Blue FC traded Mallory Pugh to Chicago Red Stars.

On January 16, 2021, Abby Dahlkemper left North Carolina Courage to sign with English club Manchester City.

On February 24, 2021, Crystal Dunn and Lindsey Horan relinquished their federation player status and signed three-year contracts with Portland Thorns FC.

== 2021 ==
=== Federation players ===
The NWSL announced the list of 22 U.S. and 10 Canada federation players for the 2021 season on February 25, 2021.

	Chicago Red Stars	Houston Dash	Kansas City	NJ/NY Gotham FC	North Carolina Courage	OL Reign	Orlando Pride	Portland Thorns FC	Racing Louisville FC	Washington Spirit
(United States)	Tierna Davidson	Jane Campbell†		Carli Lloyd	Sam Mewis*	Rose Lavelle*	Ashlyn Harris	Adrianna Franch*		Kelley O'Hara
(United States)	Julie Ertz	Kristie Mewis†		Midge Purce†	Lynn Williams†	Megan Rapinoe	Ali Krieger	Becky Sauerbrunn		Emily Sonnett
(United States)	Casey Krueger						Alex Morgan	Sophia Smith†		Andi Sullivan†
(United States)	Alyssa Naeher									
(United States)	Mallory Pugh									
(Canada)	Bianca St. Georges†	Allysha Chapman	Diana Matheson*	Kailen Sheridan		Quinn†	Erin McLeod†	Christine Sinclair		
(Canada)		Nichelle Prince	Desiree Scott							
(Canada)		Sophie Schmidt								

Highlight designates difference from previous list
† designates new federation player whose rights were already held or acquired (i.e. avoiding the newly subsidized player distribution process)
‡ designates player new to NWSL added through unattached distribution order process
Italic designates a player that did not participate in the season
* designates player who was traded or changed status during the season

=== In-season changes ===
On May 17, 2021, Rose Lavelle left Manchester City for OL Reign.

On May 17, 2021, Sam Mewis left Manchester City to re-join North Carolina Courage.

On July 7, 2021, Diana Matheson retired from professional soccer.

On August 17, 2021, Portland Thorns FC traded Adrianna Franch to Kansas City in exchange for Abby Smith and $150,000 in allocation money.

=== Offseason changes ===
Carli Lloyd retired from professional soccer at the end of the 2021 NWSL season.

After the 2021 NWSL season, Emily Sonnett and Andi Sullivan relinquished their federation player status and signed two-year contracts with Washington Spirit.

On November 30, 2021, North Carolina Courage traded the rights to Sam Mewis to Kansas City Current in exchange for Kiki Pickett and the Current's natural first-round pick in the 2022 NWSL Draft.

On December 2, 2021, Chicago Red Stars traded the rights to Julie Ertz, Sarah Gorden, and an international spot for 2022 and 2023 to Angel City FC in exchange for roster protection in the 2022 NWSL Expansion Draft.

On December 4, 2021, NJ/NY Gotham FC traded the rights to Kailen Sheridan to San Diego Wave FC in exchange for $130,000 in allocation money and roster protection in the 2022 NWSL Expansion Draft.

On December 6, 2021, Orlando Pride traded the rights to Ashlyn Harris and Ali Krieger to NJ/NY Gotham FC in exchange for a first-round pick in the 2022 NWSL Draft, a natural third-round pick in the 2023 NWSL Draft, and $50,000 in allocation money.

On December 6, 2021, Tierna Davidson, Casey Krueger, Alyssa Naeher and Mallory Pugh relinquished their federation player status and signed multi-year contracts with Chicago Red Stars.

== After subsidization ==
On December 13, 2021, the NWSL and USSF announced that the allocation system would not continue in the 2022 NWSL season. As of 2023, the NWSL continues to maintain a list of Canadian players who were allocated at the end of the 2021 season on November 5, 2021. While those players no longer receive subsidized salaries, they continue to be exempted from league limits on international players. The NWSL removes players from that list as they retire or leave the league, and if those players return, they would no longer be grandfathered into the international limit exemption.

== See also ==
- List of top-division football clubs in CONCACAF countries
- List of professional sports teams in the United States and Canada
- List of foreign NWSL players
- List of NWSL drafts
- 2013 National Women's Soccer League season
