= Libby Stout =

American association football player

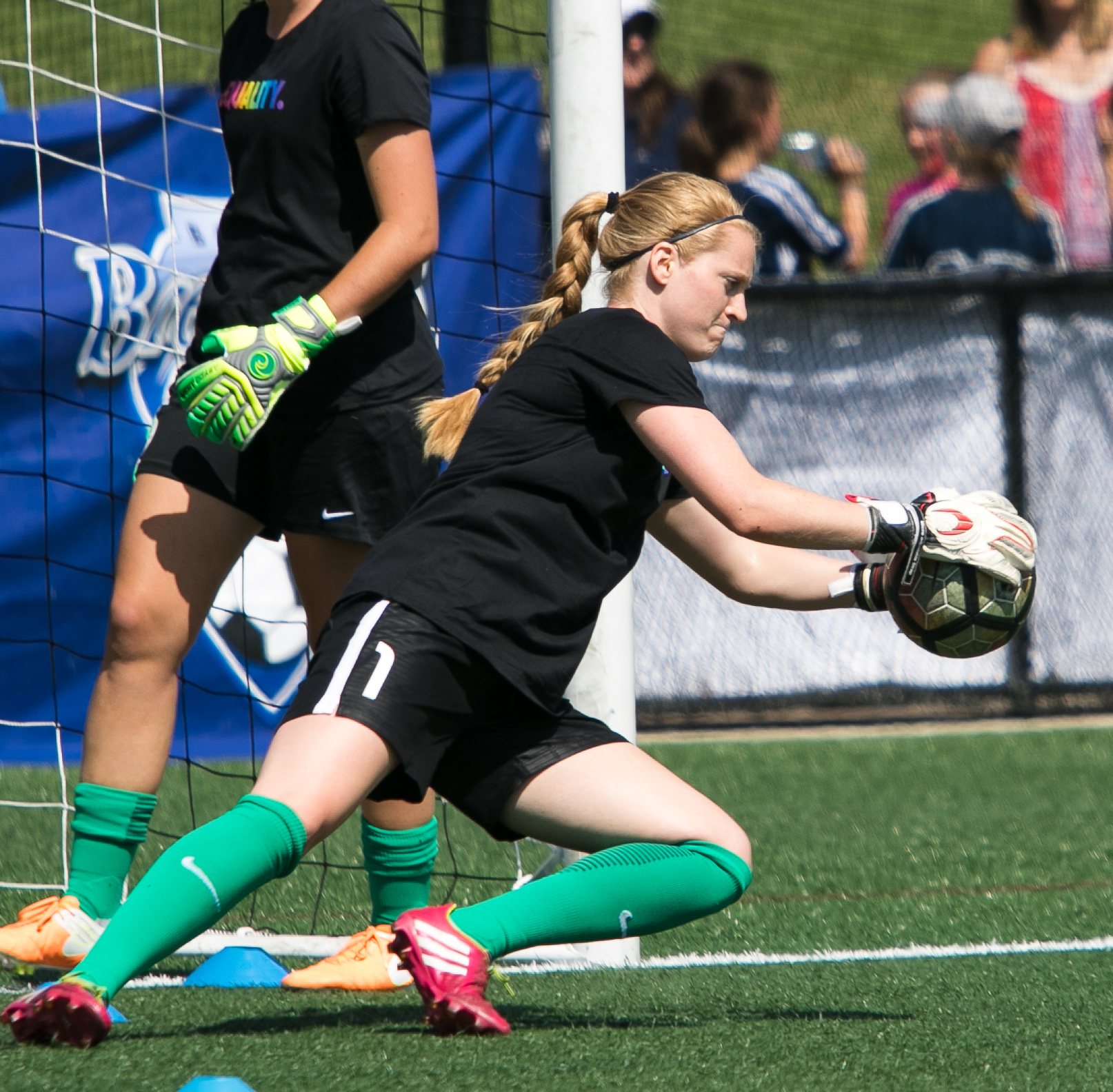

Personal information
- Full name: Elizabeth Stout
- Date of birth: June 16, 1990 (age 36)
- Place of birth: Louisville, Kentucky, United States
- Height: 1.78 m (5 ft 10 in)
- Position: Goalkeeper

Team information
- Current team: Southern Illinois Salukis

Youth career
- ?–2007: Mockingbird Valley SC
- 2004–2007: duPont Manual HS
- 2012: NTC Phoenix

College career
Years	Team	Apps	(Gls)
2008–2011	Western Kentucky Lady Toppers		

Senior career*
Years	Team	Apps	(Gls)
2012–2013	FF Yzeure Allier Auvergne	18	(0)
2013–2014	BV Cloppenburg	2	(0)
2014–2015	Liverpool	26	(0)
2015–2017	Boston Breakers	10	(0)
2017	Apollon Ladies F.C.		
2018	Orlando Pride	0	(0)
2022	Racing Louisville (USLW)	1	(0)

International career^{‡}
- United States U20
2013	United States U23	0	(0)

Managerial career
- 2018–: Southern Illinois Salukis (asst.)
- * Club domestic league appearances and goals as of June 8, 2023 ‡ National team caps and goals as of 18:01, July 24, 2015 (UTC)

Elizabeth Stout (born June 16, 1990) is an American retired professional soccer player who played as a goalkeeper. She is currently a coach with the Southern Illinois Salukis.

== Early career ==
Prior to college, she played for DuPont Manual High School and Mockingbird Valley Soccer Club (which later became Chicago Fire Juniors). Stout also played semi-professionally in the Women's Premier Soccer League following her college career.

Stout played collegiately from 2008 to 2011 at Western Kentucky University, where she set school records for wins, shutouts, goals against average, and save percentage, and recorded 39 shutouts, second in National Collegiate Athletic Association history.

== Professional career ==
Stout played at BV Cloppenburg of Frauen Bundesliga in 2013–14 and FF Yzeure Allier Auvergne of Division 1 Féminine in 2012–13.

Stout played for the Liverpool Ladies during both the 2014 and 2015 seasons. In 2014, she played 13 games, keeping seven clean sheets, to help the club win the 2014 FA WSL title.

On November 23, 2015, the Boston Breakers announced that they had signed Stout. She started 10 matches in 2016, but the Breakers drafted goalkeeper Sammy Jo Prudhomme in the 2017 NWSL College Draft and named Abby Smith the starting keeper of the 2017 season, and Stout did not appear in 2017 before the team waived her in May. However, after an injury to incumbent starter Smith in June, the Breakers re-signed Stout as a goalkeeper replacement on June 21, 2017. Later in 2017, Stout signed for Apollon Limassol of the Cypriot First Division and UEFA Women's Champions League.

After one season with Apollon Limassol, Stout announced her retirement. However, on July 19, 2018, she was signed by the Orlando Pride as a National Team Replacement Player, as Ashlyn Harris was away on international duty.

== International career ==
Stout was called up to the United States under-23 training camp in 2013, although she did not appear in a match.

== Coaching ==
In 2018, Stout joined the coaching staff of the Southern Illinois Salukis. In 2021, Stout joined Racing Louisville FC as its academy's goalkeeping director. Since 2022, she has been an assistant coach for Racing Louisville FC's amateur team playing in the USL W League. On May 12, 2022, she also appeared in a match as a player for the team, recording four saves in a shutout draw against Detroit City FC's women's side.

== Personal ==
Stout married Cortney Jodoin on February 15, 2020, in a private California wedding. The couple currently resides in Southern Illinois.

== Honors ==
Liverpool

- FA Women's Super League (1): 2014
- Liverpool Women's Player's Player of the Year (2014)
