= 2017 Boston Breakers season =

Boston Breakers
2017 season
- Owner: Boston Women's Soccer, LLC
- Head coach: Matt Beard
- Stadium: Jordan Field; Boston, Massachusetts
- NWSL: 9th
- Top goalscorer: Natasha Dowie (7)
- Highest home attendance: 4,321 (Aug 19 vs. Orlando)
- Lowest home attendance: 2,276 (May 7 vs. North Carolina)
- Average home league attendance: 2,971
Home colors	Away colors

The 2017 Boston Breakers season was the club's twelfth season overall, eighth consecutive season, and fifth season as a member of the National Women's Soccer League. They finished 9th in the 10 team league with a record of 4 wins, 13 losses, and 7 draws.

As of 2023, this was the Boston Breakers's final season. After failed last-minute attempts to sell the club to the owners of the New England Revolution and to local commercial real estate developers, the Boston Breakers officially folded on January 25, 2018, and did not participate in the NWSL in 2018. Reports generally blamed lack of marketing and resultant limited fanbase for the club's demise.

== Players and coaches ==
=== Coaching staff ===
Position	Staff
Head Coach	Matt Beard
Assistant Coach	Paul McHugh
Goalkeeper Coach	Neill Caine
Pro Team Second Assistant/Breakers College Academy Coach	Leanne Champ
Head of Sport Science and Player Performance	Julian Haigh
Reserve Team Head Coach	Dushawne Simpson
Breakers U-20 Head Coach	Javier Mejia-Blau
Consultant	Ashley Phillips

Last updated: April 11, 2017

=== Players ===
As of June 30, 2017

Note: Flags indicate national team as defined under FIFA eligibility rules; some limited exceptions apply. Players may hold more than one non-FIFA nationality.

No.	Pos.	Nation	Player
1	GK	USA	Libby Stout
2	DF	CAN	Allysha Chapman
3	DF	USA	Brooke Elby
4	DF	USA	Megan Oyster
5	MF	POR	Amanda DaCosta
7	FW	NOR	Emilie Haavi
8	DF	USA	Julie King
9	FW	ENG	Natasha Dowie
10	MF	NZL	Rosie White
11	MF	USA	Rose Lavelle
14	GK	USA	Abby Smith

No.	Pos.	Nation	Player
15	GK	USA	Sammy Jo Prudhomme
17	DF	USA	Amanda Frisbie
18	FW	USA	Tiffany Weimer
19	FW	CAN	Adriana Leon
20	DF	USA	Christen Westphal
21	FW	USA	Margaret Purce
22	FW	USA	Ifeoma Onumonu
23	FW	USA	Katie Stengel
25	MF	USA	Morgan Andrews
26	MF	USA	Angela Salem

=== Mid-Season Roster Transactions ===
On June 21, it was announced the team re-signed goalkeeper Libby Stout as a keeper replacement for the injured Abby Smith. Stout has previously been initially waived by the team on May 10. On June 30, 2017, the Breakers waived defender Kylie Strom from the roster, and picked up forward Katie Stengel from waivers, who was released on June 28 by the Washington Spirit.

== Pre-season ==
March 25, 2017	Boston College	1–5	Boston Breakers	Newton, MA
	BC 31'	Report	Leon 2'; Leon 68'; Leon 86'; White 88'; Onomonu 90'	Stadium: Boston College; Attendance: closed door

March 28, 2017	Boston Breakers	5–1	NE Futbol Club U-15 boys	Taunton, MA
	White 40'; Elby 45'; Leon 48'; Onomonu 65'; White 73'	Report	NEFC 56'	Stadium: Forekicks

April 8, 2017	Boston Breakers	6–1	UCONN	Boston, MA
	Weimer 10'; Dowie 17'; White 33'; Dowie 45'; Weimer 57'; Dowd 87'	Report	UConn	Stadium: Jordan Field; Attendance: none taken
Note: match postponed from 4/1

April 4, 2017	Boston Breakers	v	Sky Blue FC	Bridgeport, CT
				Stadium: University of Bridgeport
Note: no report avail, result = v

== Regular season ==
Sun. April 16, 2017	FC Kansas City	2–0	Boston Breakers	Kansas City, MO
	Leroux 7' (Sauerbrunn); Rodriguez 48' (Groom)	Report	Chapman (yellow card) 37'; White (yellow card) 60'	Stadium: Swope Soccer Village; Attendance: 3,340

Sun. April 23, 2017	Boston Breakers	1–0	Sky Blue FC	Boston, MA
	Dowie 37' (Lavelle); Salem (yellow card) 86'	Report		Stadium: Jordan Field; Attendance: 2,329
Note: Steward MVP: Abby Smith; Supporters Award Winner: Rosie White

April 29, 2017	Boston Breakers	3–0	Seattle Reign FC	Boston, MA
	Leon 11'; Lavelle 15' (Leon); Dowie 52' (Leon); White (yellow card) 37'; Chapman (yellow card) 76'	Report	Fishlock (yellow card) 32'; Mathias (yellow card) 38'	Stadium: Jordan Field; Attendance: 2,315
Note: Steward MVP:Adriana Leon; Supporters Award Winner: Abby Smith

Sun. May 7, 2017	Boston Breakers	0–1	North Carolina Courage	Boston, MA
	King (yellow card) 35'; White (yellow card) 53'; Leon (yellow card) 81'	Report	McDonald 32'; Smith (yellow card) 87'	Stadium: Jordan Field; Attendance: 2,276
Note: Steward MVP: Angela Salem; Supporters Award Winner: Allysha Chapman

Sun. May 14, 2017	Chicago Red Stars	1–1	Boston Breakers	Chicago, IL
	Press 89' (Huerta)	Report	Lavelle 69'; King (yellow card) 73'	Stadium: Toyota Park; Attendance: 1,827

May 19, 2017	Boston Breakers	2–2	Portland Thorns FC	Boston, MA
	Dowie 38' (Leon); White 48' (Dowie); Salem (yellow card) 90'	Report	Nadim 57' (pen.); Weber (yellow card) 65'; Cox (yellow card) 67'; Nadim 83' (Raso)	Stadium: Jordan Field; Attendance: 3,321
Note: Steward MVP: Natasha Dowie; Supporters Award Winner: Angela Salem

May 27, 2017	Portland Thorns FC	2–0	Boston Breakers	Portland, OR
	King 1' (o.g.); Henry 5'; Nadim (yellow card) 49'	Report	Haavi (yellow card) 24'; Westphal (yellow card) 71'; Chapman (red card) 90+1'	Stadium: Providence Park; Attendance: 18,637

June 3, 2017	Orlando Pride	2–0	Boston Breakers	Orlando, FL
	Marta 9' (pen.); Spencer 13' (Pereira); Kennedy (yellow card) 26'; Camila (yellow card) 49'	Report	Smith (yellow card) 8'; Elby (yellow card) 55'; White (yellow card) 57'; Dowie (yellow card) 85'	Stadium: Orlando City Stadium; Attendance: 5,185

June 17, 2017	North Carolina Courage	3–1	Boston Breakers	Cary, NC
	Hamilton 3' (Mewis), 13' (Zerboni); Hatch 38' (Doniak)	Report	Leon 73' (Dowie); White (yellow card) 80'	Stadium: WakeMed Soccer Park; Attendance: 3,780

June 24, 2017	Boston Breakers	0–1	North Carolina Courage	Boston, MA
	Oyster (yellow card) 16'; Weimer (yellow card) 84'	Report	Hatch 44' (Mewis)	Stadium: Jordan Field; Attendance: 3,209
Note: Steward MVP: Julie King; Supporters Award Winner: Christen Westphal

June 28, 2017	Houston Dash	0–0	Boston Breakers	Houston, TX
		Report	Andrews (yellow card) 25'; Chapman (yellow card) 58'	Stadium: BBVA Compass Stadium; Attendance: 6,095

July 1, 2017	Boston Breakers	1–0	Washington Spirit	Boston, MA
	Chapman (yellow card) 62'; Purce 72' (White)	Report	Johnson (yellow card) 64'	Stadium: Jordan Field; Attendance: 2,523
Note: Steward MVP: Megan Oyster; Supporters Award Winner: Margaret Purce

July 7, 2017	Boston Breakers	0–0	Chicago Red Stars	Boston, MA
	Chapman (yellow card) 80'; White (yellow card) 90'	Report	Mautz (yellow card) 62'	Stadium: Jordan Field; Attendance: 2,435
Note: Steward MVP: Sammy Jo Prudhomme; Supporters Award Winner: Sammy Jo Prudhomme

July 15, 2017	Seattle Reign FC	1–1	Boston Breakers	Seattle, WA
	Kawasumi 32'	Report	Leon 43' (Westphal)	Stadium: Memorial Stadium (Seattle); Attendance: 3,730

July 22, 2017	Houston Dash	1–0	Boston Breakers	Houston, TX
	Prince 23'	Report		Stadium: BBVA Compass Stadium; Attendance: 5,337

Aug 4, 2017	Boston Breakers	2–2	FC Kansas City	Boston, MA
	White 26' White 30'	Report	Kelly 21' Tymrak 81'	Stadium: Jordan Field; Attendance: 2,510
Note: Steward MVP: Rosie White; Supporters Award Winner: Adriana Leon

Aug 12, 2017	Washington Spirit	2–2	Boston Breakers	Boyds, MD
	Johnson 6' Williams 64'	Report	Leon 44' Leon 79' (Onumonu) Salem (yellow card) 95'	Stadium: Maryland SoccerPlex; Attendance: 3,722

Aug 16, 2017	Boston Breakers	1–3	Houston Dash	Boston, MA
	Dowie 26' (Purce) Smith (yellow card) 46' Oyster (yellow card) 93'	Report	Hagen 10' Beckie 64' (Prince) Hagen 79'	Stadium: Jordan Field; Attendance: 3,003
Note: Steward MVP: Amanda Frisbie; Supporters Award Winner: Ifeoma Onumonu

Aug 19, 2017	Boston Breakers	1–2	Orlando Pride	Boston, MA
	Stengel (yellow card) 52' Andrews (yellow card) 71' White (yellow card) 95' Amanda Dacosta 98' (pen.)	Report	Morgan 8' Kennedy (yellow card) 24' Steph Catley (yellow card) 58'Morgan 73' (Krieger)	Stadium: Jordan Field; Attendance: 4,321
Note: Steward MVP: Smith; Supporters Award Winner: Amanda Dacosta

Aug 26, 2017	Sky Blue FC	1–0	Boston Breakers	Piscataway, NJ
	Kerr 5' (Stanton) Stanton (yellow card) 57'		Leon (yellow card) 60' King (yellow card) 91'	Stadium: Yurcak Field; Attendance: 2,244

Sep 2, 2017	Orlando Pride	4–2	Boston Breakers	Orlando, FL
	Hill 8' Hill 15' (Morgan)Marta 67' (Ubogagu) Ubogagu 77'	Report	White 49' (Frisbie)Elby (yellow card) 63'King 88' (Leon)	Stadium: Orlando City Stadium; Attendance: 5,413

Sun. Sep 10, 2017	Boston Breakers	0–1	Portland Thorns FC	Boston, MA
	Oyster (yellow card) 82'	Report	Sinclair 72' (Raso)	Stadium: Jordan Field; Attendance: 3,015
Note: Steward MVP: Purce; Supporters Award Winner: Margaret Purce

Sep 23, 2017	Washington Spirit	0–3	Boston Breakers	Boyds, MD
		Report	Dowie 47' (Leon) Kallman 54' (o.g.) Leon 55'Frisbie (yellow card) 69' White (yellow card) 77'	Stadium: Maryland SoccerPlex; Attendance: 3,475

Sep 30, 2017	Boston Breakers	3–4	Sky Blue FC	Boston, MA
	Dowie 25'Dowie 28'Purce (yellow card) 64'Casey 85' (o.g.)	Report	Kerr 34' Tiernan (yellow card) 72' Tiernan 76'Skroski 78' O'Hara 87'	Stadium: Jordan Field; Attendance: 3,497

Win Draw Loss Postponed

=== Results summary ===
Overall								Home						Away					
Pld	W	D	L	GF	GA	GD	Pts	W	D	L	GF	GA	GD	W	D	L	GF	GA	GD
24	4	7	13	24	35	−11	19	3	3	6	14	16	−2	1	4	7	10	19	−9

Last updated: September 30, 2017.
Source: NWSLsoccer.com

=== League standings ===
Pos	Team	Pld	W	D	L	GF	GA	GD	Pts	Qualification
1	North Carolina Courage	24	16	1	7	38	22	+16	49	NWSL Shield
2	Portland Thorns FC (C)	24	14	5	5	37	20	+17	47	NWSL Playoffs
3	Orlando Pride	24	11	7	6	45	31	+14	40	NWSL Playoffs
4	Chicago Red Stars	24	11	6	7	33	30	+3	39	NWSL Playoffs
5	Seattle Reign FC	24	9	7	8	43	37	+6	34	
6	Sky Blue FC	24	10	3	11	42	51	−9	33	
7	FC Kansas City	24	8	7	9	29	31	−2	31	
8	Houston Dash	24	7	3	14	23	39	−16	24	
9	Boston Breakers	24	4	7	13	24	35	−11	19	
10	Washington Spirit	24	5	4	15	30	48	−18	19	

Source: NWSL
Rules for classification: Tiebreakers
(C) Champions

=== 2017 Supporters Award ===
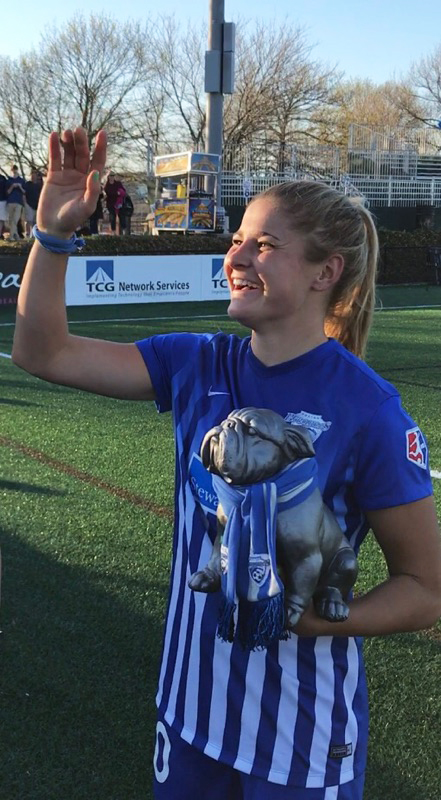

In 2017 the official supporters group of the Boston Breakers, The Boston Armada, began a tradition of awarding one player at each home game with a supporters award. This award recognizes a player's individual contribution to the team during the match.

The trophy for 2017 is representative of the unofficial mascot of the Boston Breakers, "Chunk", a British Bulldog owned by team President of Soccer Operations and Development, Lee Billard.

Date of Home Match	Opponent	Award Recipient
April 23, 2017	Sky Blue FC	Rosie White
April 29, 2017	Seattle Reign FC	Abby Smith
May 7, 2017	North Carolina Courage	Allysha Chapman
May 19, 2017	Portland Thorns FC	Angela Salem
June 24, 2017	North Carolina Courage	Christen Westphal
July 1, 2017	Washington Spirit	Margaret Purce
July 7, 2017	Chicago Red Stars	Sammy Jo Prudhomme
August 4, 2017	FC Kansas City	Adriana Leon
August 16, 2017	Houston Dash	Ifeoma Onumonu
August 19, 2017	Orlando Pride	Amanda DaCosta
September 10, 2017	Portland Thorns FC	Margaret Purce
September 30, 2017	The COTY (Chunk of the Year Award)	Angela Salem

== See also ==
- 2017 National Women's Soccer League season
- 2017 in American soccer
