= Morgan Andrews =

American soccer player (born 1995)

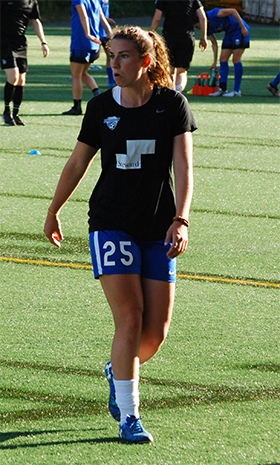
- Andrews playing for Boston Breakers, 2017

Personal information
- Full name: Morgan Elizabeth Andrews
- Date of birth: March 25, 1995 (age 31)
- Place of birth: Milford, New Hampshire, United States
- Height: 5 ft 9 in (1.75 m)
- Position: Midfielder

Youth career
- FC Stars of Massachusetts

College career
Years	Team	Apps	(Gls)
2013–2014	Notre Dame Fighting Irish	44	(13)
2015–2016	USC Trojans	47	(22)

Senior career*
Years	Team	Apps	(Gls)
2012–2014	New England Mutiny		
2017	Boston Breakers	18	(0)
2018–2020	OL Reign	25	(0)
2019–2020	→ Perth Glory (loan)	11	(7)

International career
2011–2012	United States U17	19	(2)
2013–2014	United States U20	10	
2011–2018	United States U23		
- * Club domestic league appearances and goals as of March 4, 2020

Morgan Elizabeth Andrews (born March 25, 1995) is an American soccer player who last played as a midfielder for OL Reign in the National Women's Soccer League (NWSL). She previously played for Perth Glory and Boston Breakers.

Andrews has represented the United States on numerous national teams from the under-15 to the under-23 levels. She was twice named the Gatorade National High School Athlete of the Year in 2012 and 2013 and helped lead the USC Trojans to their second-ever NCAA College Cup title in 2016.

== Early life ==
Raised in Milford, New Hampshire, Andrews attended Milford High School, where she captained the varsity soccer team and set new school and conference records for career goals (114). As a senior in 2012, Andrews led the team to its first state title (Division II), scored 31 goals, and served 18 assists (80 points), although she missed several games due to national team obligations.

Andrews was twice named the Gatorade National High School Athlete of the Year in 2012 and 2013. She was the second soccer player (male or female) to receive the top award after Morgan Brian in 2011. She was one of only nine recipients in the award's 29-year history to earn the title twice in their respective sport. She was named Gatorade New Hampshire Player of the Year three consecutive years from 2011 to 2013), National Soccer Coaches Association of America (NSCAA) High School Player of the Year in 2012, and NSCAA Youth Player of the Year in 2011. In 2012, she was honored by the New Hampshire Union Leader with the Robert A. "Red" Rolfe Award as the New Hampshire Female Athlete of the Year. In 2011, she was named the top-rated class of 2013 high school player in the country by ESPN.

Starting in 2012, Andrews played summers for the New England Mutiny, the first season in the semi-professional Women's Premier Soccer League Elite and then two more seasons in the primarily college player-filled Women's Premier Soccer League.

=== University of Notre Dame, 2013–2014 ===
Andrews attended the University of Notre Dame for two years, playing for the Fighting Irish from in 2013 and 2014. As a rookie freshman, she started all 22 matches, becoming one of eight freshmen in the history of the program to start every match. Andrews' seven goals tied the team lead in scoring, ranked first in points (19), shots (73) and match-winning goals (4). She earned ACC Player of the Week honors and made Top Drawer Soccer National Team of the Week for the second consecutive week after scoring a match-winning goal against the North Carolina Tar Heels. Andrews earned numerous honors, including Atlantic Coast Conference (ACC) Freshman of the Year, ACC All-Freshman Team, Soccer America All-Freshman First Team, Top Drawer Soccer Freshman Best XI First Team, All-ACC Second Team, and the NSCAA All-Southeast Region Third Team recognition.

During her sophomore season, Andrews led the Irish in points for the second consecutive season with 17 and started all 22 games (one of three players to do so). She scored six goals, including two game-winning goals, and recorded five assists (three of which occurred during the first two games of the season). She was twice named to the Top Drawer Soccer Team of the Week. She was named Second Team All-ACC.

=== University of Southern California, 2015–2016 ===
After transferring to the University of Southern California, Andrews led the Trojans in goals with 12 and points (28) in 2015. She became the first USC player to score a hat trick in an NCAA College Cup game when she helped the team equalize against Cal State Fullerton and advance after penalty kicks during the first round of the NCAA Tournament. She was subsequently named Top Drawer Soccer Player of the Week.

Andrews earned several honors, including NSCAA All-American Second Team selection, All-Pac-12 First Team honoree, and NSCAA All-Pacific Region First Team. She was named to the Top Drawer Soccer Team of the Week three times during the year and earned College Soccer 360 Team of the Week honors. She was ranked the 2nd best collegiate player in the Pac-12 Conference by Top Drawer Soccer. In January 2016, the New England Soccer Journal named her the 42nd best soccer player to come out of New England.

In 2016, she helped lead the team win the NCAA College Cup.

== Club career ==
=== Boston Breakers, 2017 ===
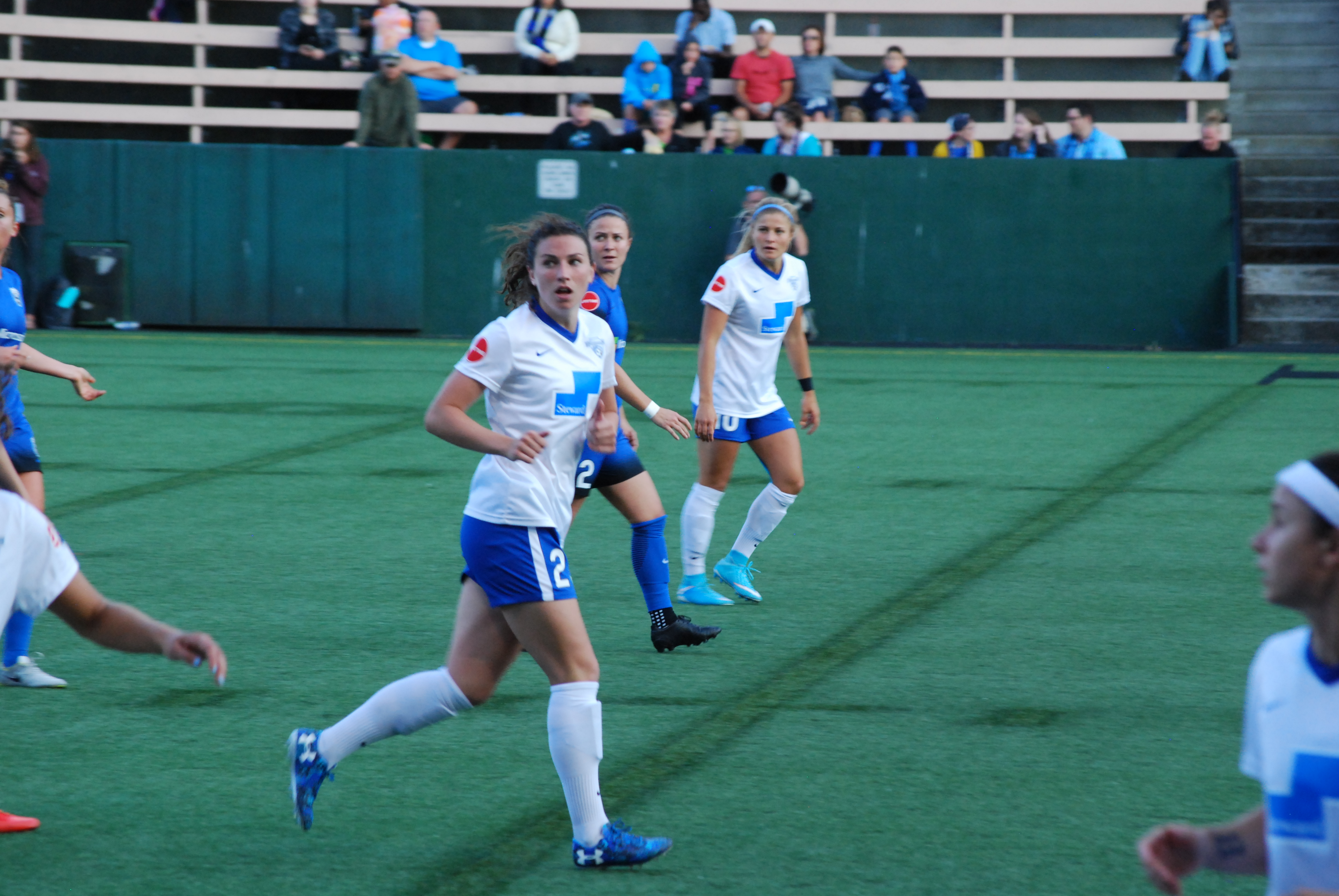
Andrews during a match against Reign FC, July 2017

Andrews was selected third overall in the first round of the 2017 NWSL College Draft by the Boston Breakers. She signed with the club in March of the same year. Andrews made her professional debut for the Breakers during the team's season opener against FC Kansas City. She was in the starting lineup 10 times in her 18 caps of the 2017 season. The Breakers finished in ninth place during the regular season with a 4–13–7 record.

=== Reign FC, 2018–2020 ===
After the Breakers ceased operations just prior to the 2018 season, Reign FC selected Andrews as their second pick (eleventh overall) in the 2018 NWSL Dispersal Draft on January 30, 2018. She made her debut for the club during its first game of the 2018 season — a 2–1 win over the Washington Spirit on March 24. Andrews made 16 appearances for the Reign in 2018.

She re–signed with the club prior to the 2019 NWSL season. On May 18, 2019, during a match against Sky Blue FC, Andrews played the final three minutes in goal following an injury to goalkeeper Michelle Betos.

In 2019, Andrews signed for Australian W-League club Perth Glory for the 2019–20 season.

== International career ==
Andrews has represented the United States on multiple youth national teams, starting on the under-14 team and including the under-15, under-17, under-20 and under-23 national teams. Andrews was called into training camp for the under-23 national team in October 2011 at the age of 16.

Andrews captained the under-17 national team at the 2012 CONCACAF Women's U-17 Championship in Guatemala and helped the team qualify for the 2012 FIFA U-17 Women's World Cup.

Andrews competed with the under-20 national team and won the 2014 CONCACAF Women's U-20 Championship in the Cayman Islands. She played in all five matches and started three times. Her assists in all three of the team's group-stage wins helped lift the team to the eventual championship title. She competed at the 2013 Twelve Nations Tournament in La Manga Club, Spain, and started in all three matches. In August 2016, Top Drawer Soccer ranked her the fourth-best midfielder in the youth national team system.

On August 23, 2018, she was named to the United States U-23 team for the 2018 Nordic tournament.

== Personal life ==
Andrews brother, Michael, formerly participated in Teach for America. Her other brother, Matthew, is a United States Army Special Forces Green Beret who has served in Afghanistan.

== Honors ==
USC Trojans

- NCAA College Cup: 2016

United States U17

- CONCACAF Women's U-17 Championship: 2012

United States U20

- CONCACAF Women's U-20 Championship: 2014

Individual

- U.S. Soccer Young Female Athlete of the Year nominee: 2011
- Gatorade National Female Soccer Player of the Year: 2012, 2013
- Gatorade National Female Athlete of the Year: 2013
- PFA W-League Team of the Season: 2019–20
- W-League Golden Boot: 2019–20
- W-League Player of the Month: February 2020
