= Adriana Leon =

Canadian soccer player (born 1992)

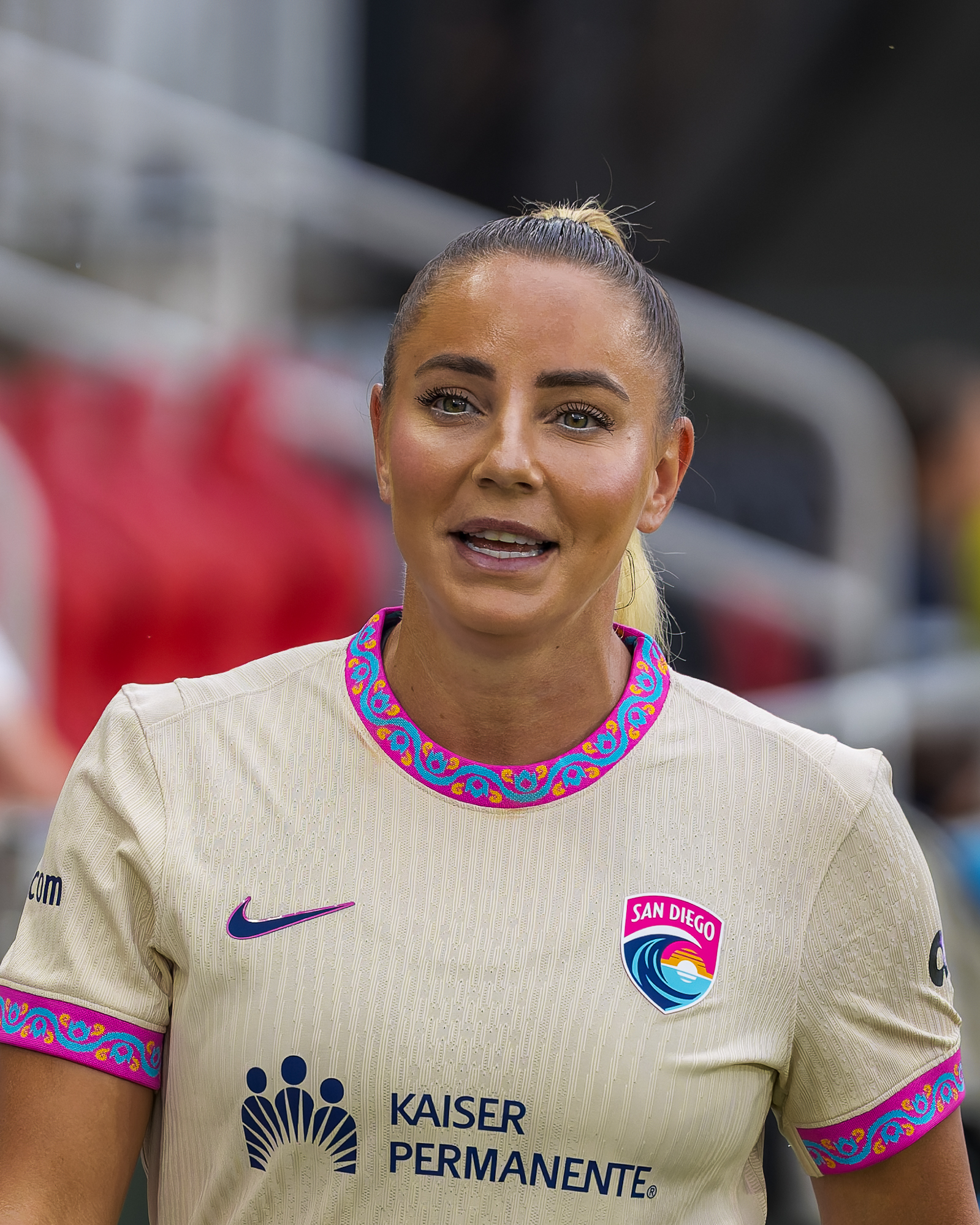
- Leon with the San Diego Wave in 2026

Personal information
- Full name: Adriana Kristina Leon
- Date of birth: October 2, 1992 (age 34)
- Place of birth: Mississauga, Ontario, Canada
- Height: 1.61 m (5 ft 3 in)
- Position: Forward

Team information
- Current team: San Diego Wave
- Number: 9

Youth career
- Vaughan SC
- Pickering SC
- Mississauga Falcons SC
- Brams United SC

College career
Years	Team	Apps	(Gls)
2010–2011	Notre Dame Fighting Irish	43	(10)
2012	Florida Gators	22	(5)

Senior career*
Years	Team	Apps	(Gls)
2010–2012	Toronto Lady Lynx	9	(3)
2013	Boston Breakers	6	(1)
2013–2015	Chicago Red Stars	35	(3)
2016	Western New York Flash	10	(0)
2016	FC Zürich	5	(0)
2017	Boston Breakers	24	(6)
2018	Sky Blue FC	2	(0)
2018	Seattle Reign	6	(0)
2019–2022	West Ham United	43	(9)
2022–2023	Manchester United	5	(1)
2023	→ Portland Thorns (loan)	5	(0)
2023–2025	Aston Villa	29	(8)
2025–	San Diego Wave	34	(4)

International career^{‡}
2010–2012	Canada U-20	8	(5)
2012–	Canada	132	(44)
Medal record
Representing Canada
CONCACAF W Championship
Runner-up	2018 United States
Runner-up	2022 Mexico
Olympics
Gold medal – first place	Tokyo 2020
- * Club domestic league appearances and goals as of 16:42, November 15, 2026 (UTC) ‡ National team caps and goals as of December 2, 2025

Adriana Kristina Leon (born October 2, 1992) is a Canadian professional soccer player who plays as a forward for San Diego Wave FC of the National Women's Soccer League (NWSL) and the Canada national team.

She previously played college soccer for NCAA Division I programs Notre Dame Fighting Irish and Florida Gators before playing professionally for the Boston Breakers, Chicago Red Stars, Western New York Flash, Sky Blue FC, Seattle Reign and Portland Thorns in the NWSL, Swiss club FC Zürich in the Nationalliga A, and West Ham United, Manchester United and Aston Villa of the English Women's Super League. Leon made her senior international debut in 2012, and has represented Canada at two FIFA Women's World Cup tournaments and won Olympic gold at Tokyo 2020.

== Early life ==
Born in Mississauga, Ontario, Leon was raised in Maple and moved with her family to King City in 2010 at the age of 16. Her extended family holds a controlling share of Canadian furniture store Leon's. Leon began figure skating before taking up ice hockey at the age of 10, playing seven seasons of minor hockey up to Midget AA level. In her final season she won both the Provincial Women's Hockey League title and a gold medal at the Ontario Women's Hockey Association provincial championships with a Toronto Jr. Aeros team that also consisted of future Canada ice hockey internationals Jill Saulnier and Erin Ambrose. While at The Country Day School, Leon played soccer, volleyball and rugby, earning the rugby team's MVP honour in 2009. She played youth soccer for Vaughan SC, Brams United and Mississauga Falcons. In 2009, Leon was part of the Team Ontario squad that won bronze at the Canada Summer Games and finished as the tournament's top scorer with seven goals in five matches having scored in every game.

== College career ==
Leon accepted an athletic scholarship to attend the University of Notre Dame and played for the Notre Dame Fighting Irish women's soccer team in 2010 and 2011. As a freshman she made 23 appearances and scored four goals. In the 2010 College Cup final she came off the bench to score the lone goal in a 1–0 victory over the Stanford Cardinal and was named to the All-Tournament Team. As a sophomore, she was joint-second for the team lead with six goals in 20 appearances.

After two seasons with the Irish, Leon transferred to the University of Florida, where she played for coach Becky Burleigh's Florida Gators in 2012. She made 22 appearances, playing in every available match after missing the first three matches while touring Japan with the Canadian national U-20 team. Leon scored five goals including four game-winners for the Gators and helped the team to Southeastern Conference regular season and tournament titles.

== Club career ==
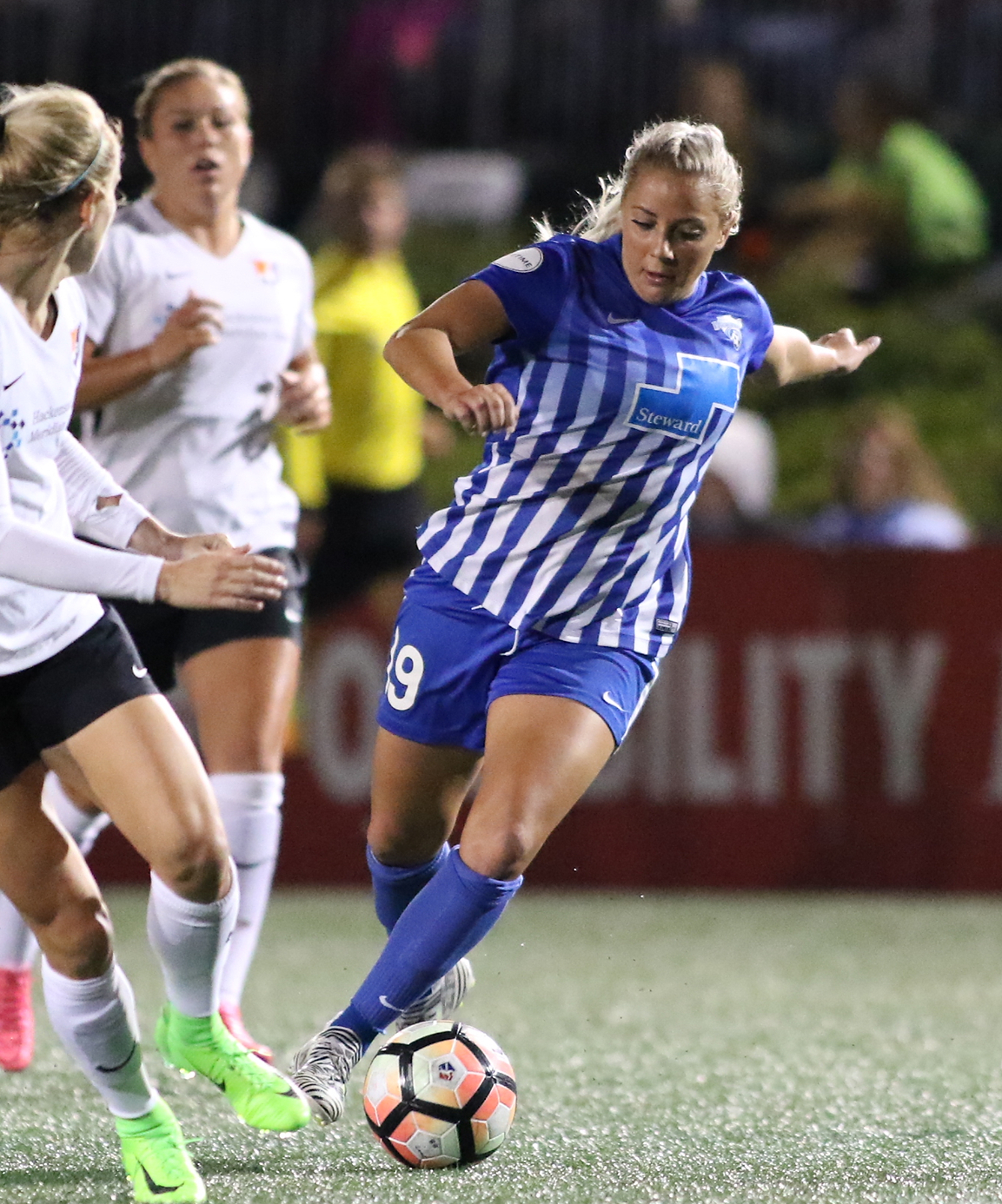
Adriana Leon playing for the Boston Breakers in the 2017 NWSL season

=== Boston Breakers (2013) ===
Ahead of the inaugural 2013 NWSL season, Leon was named as one of 16 players subsidized by the Canadian federations as part of the initial NWSL Player Allocation. She was allocated to the Boston Breakers. Having been an unused substitute in the team's opening match, Leon made her professional debut on April 27, 2013, as an 84th-minute substitute for Sydney Leroux as part of a 2–1 win away at Western New York Flash. She scored her first goal in a 5–1 loss against Sky Blue FC on June 1, 2013.

=== Chicago Red Stars ===
On June 29, 2013, the Boston Breakers traded Leon to the Chicago Red Stars in exchange for Carmelina Moscato. She made 35 appearances in three seasons with Chicago, scoring one goal in each of the three seasons.

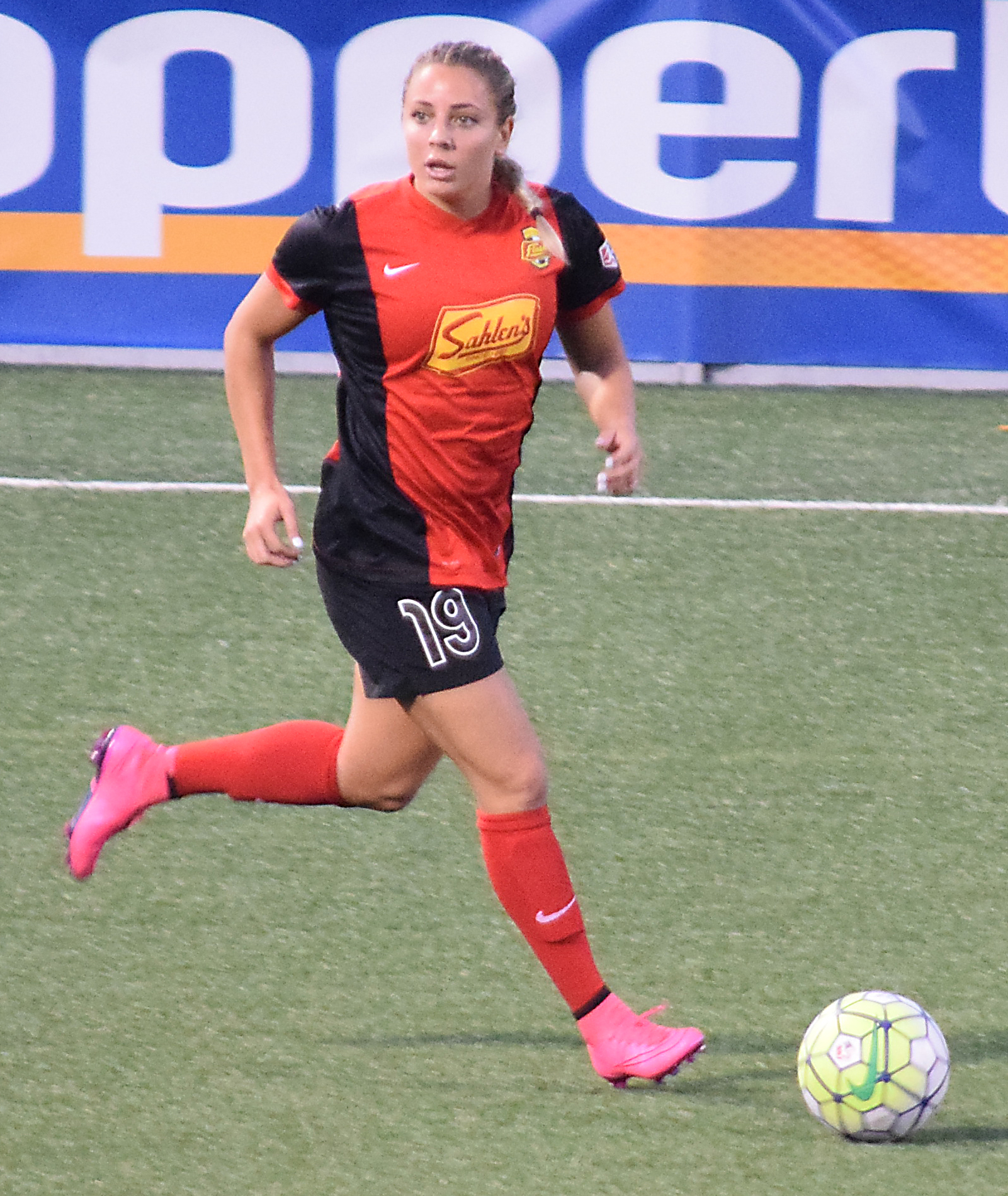
Leon playing for the Flash in 2016

=== Western New York Flash ===
In November 2015, Western New York Flash acquired Leon along with Abby Erceg and the No. 9 overall pick in the 2016 NWSL College Draft from Chicago in exchange for Whitney Engen and a fourth-round pick in the 2017 NWSL College Draft. She made 10 appearances during the 2016 season including three starts without scoring before departing in August 2016.

=== FC Zürich ===
On August 30, 2016, Leon transferred to FC Zürich of the Swiss Nationalliga A for an undisclosed fee. She made five league appearances without scoring but had some standout performances in other competitions. She registered a goal and three assists in a 5–0 win over FC Luzern in the second round of the Swiss Cup before scoring again in the next round as Zürich beat FC Walperswil 8–1. On October 5, 2016, Leon starred in a UEFA Champions League round of 32 victory over Austrian side SK Sturm Graz, scoring a hattrick and registering a further three assists in a 6–0 victory. On December 1, 2016, it was announced that Leon and the club had mutually agreed to terminate her contract so that she could return to North America.

=== Boston Breakers (2017) ===
On January 30, 2017, it was announced that Leon had rejoined the Boston Breakers ahead of the 2017 season. She was named NWSL Player of the Week twice during the season: once for week three for her performance against Seattle Reign, scoring one goal and registering two assists as part of a 3–0 victory, and again in week 21 for a one-goal and one assist performance in a 3–0 win over Washington Spirit. Leon appeared in all 24 Boston Breakers matches in 2017, scoring a total of six goals.

=== Sky Blue FC ===
The Breakers ceased operations prior to the start of the 2018 season and the players were redistributed within the league via the 2018 NWSL Dispersal Draft. Leon was selected in the second round by Sky Blue FC. She made two substitute appearances for the team before being traded.

=== Seattle Reign ===
On June 12, 2018, Leon was traded to the Seattle Reign FC in exchange for a fourth-round pick in the 2019 NWSL College Draft. Leon made six appearances for Seattle in 2018 including one start before the club opted not to retain her NWSL rights ahead of the 2019 season.

=== West Ham United ===
On January 12, 2019, Leon signed for West Ham United midway through the team's debut Women's Super League season. The move reunited Leon with Matt Beard who had been her head coach in Boston. In her debut campaign she made 10 appearances in all competitions, scoring three goals including two in a 3–1 win over Blackburn Rovers in the fourth round of the FA Cup. West Ham reached the FA Cup final for the first time in the club's history in 2019 before losing the final at Wembley Stadium 3–0 to Manchester City with Leon playing the full 90 minutes. The following season Leon was West Ham's top league goalscorer with five prior to the WSL season being curtailed due to the COVID-19 pandemic. On June 29, 2022, West Ham announced Leon had decided to leave the club upon the expiration of her contract that summer after three and a half seasons. She made a total of 59 appearances in all competitions and scored 12 goals.

=== Manchester United ===
On July 4, 2022, Leon signed a two-year contract with Manchester United. She made her debut for the club on September 17, 2022, as a 64th-minute substitute for Lucía García in the opening game of the season, a 4–0 win at home to Reading and scored her first goal in gameweek three on October 16 in a 4–0 win at home to Brighton & Hove Albion. Leon saw her playing time limited nine appearances in all competitions, including five in the WSL all as a substitute, scoring three goals. She was reportedly the subject of a loan move from A.C. Milan in January and then later offered to several WSL clubs but United stalled and none of these deals could be completed in time. Head coach Marc Skinner confirmed he had been leaving her out of the squad because she needed to improve to earn a spot in a "really competitive squad" and put on extra training sessions for her.

==== Loan to Portland Thorns ====
On April 13, 2023, still searching for playing time having made two appearances since the turn of the year, Leon joined National Women's Soccer League club Portland Thorns on loan for the remainder of the 2022–23 WSL season, until June 30, 2023. She made five league and two cup appearances for the club before the loan expired.

=== Aston Villa ===
On September 11, 2023, Aston Villa announced the signing of Leon on a two-year contract. She scored her first goal for the club in November 2023, helping Aston Villa secure victory over her Leon's former club, West Ham United. After playing in 18 matches and scoring 5 times in her first season with Aston Villa, she found herself struggling to earn playing time under coach Robert de Pauw. However, following De Pauw's departure, Leon found greater success and scored a brace in only her second start of the year.

=== San Diego Wave ===
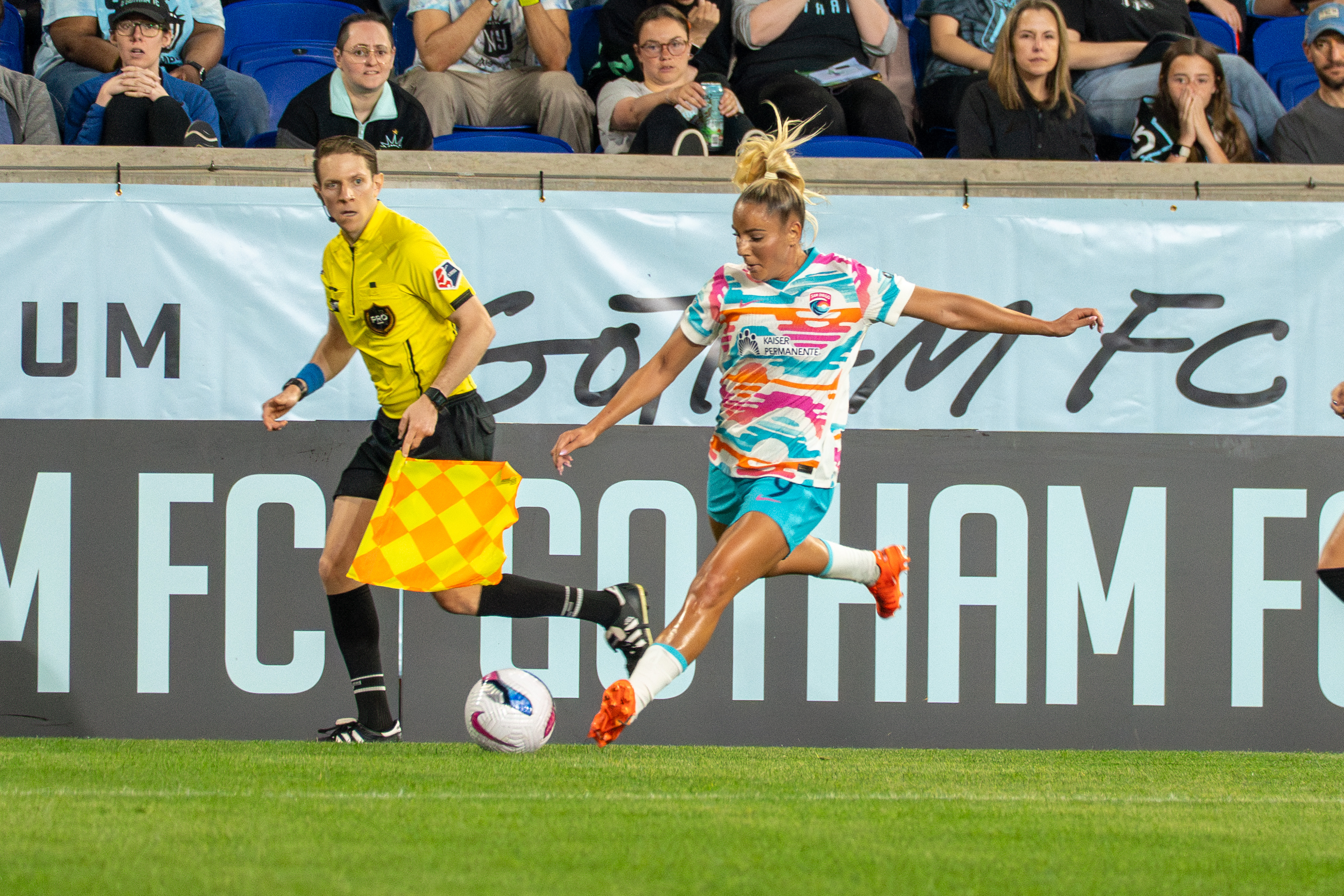
Leon for the Wave in 2025

On February 24, 2025, it was announced that Leon had joined San Diego Wave on a two-year deal with a mutual option from Aston Villa in exchange for an undisclosed fee. She made her club debut in the Wave's season opener, coming on as a second-half substitute for Kyra Carusa in a 1–1 draw with Angel City FC. During the following match, a win over the Utah Royals, Leon registered her first start and first goal with the Wave. On April 26, she recorded her first NWSL assist, helping teammate Kimmi Ascanio notch her first professional goal. At the end of May, she scored a brace in a 5–2 win over the North Carolina Courage, helping San Diego set a new club record for goals scored in a single match and extend their unbeaten streak to six games. Her performance in the match was subsequently rewarded by NWSL Player of the Week and Goal of the Week honors.

On June 13, Leon played in her 100th NWSL regular season match, a road game versus the Houston Dash. She scored a goal in the 3–2 victory, becoming the 11th player in the league to have done so in their 100th game. She played in all 26 of San Diego's 2025 regular season matches, setting a single-season career-high for herself, as the Wave finished sixth in the NWSL standings and qualified for the playoffs. She made a substitute cameo in the club's quarterfinal loss to the Portland Thorns on November 9.

Leon spent the entire first half of the 2026 season sidelined with an injury.

== International career ==
=== Youth ===
Leon represented Canada at under-20 level at the 2010 CONCACAF Women's U-20 Championship, starting all three group games and scoring twice in wins over Costa Rica and Guatemala as Canada topped the group. However, a 1–0 semifinal defeat to Mexico in extra-time and a further 1–0 defeat to Costa Rica in the third-place playoff meant Canada failed to qualify for the 2010 FIFA U-20 Women's World Cup.

In 2012, Leon was not included in the final squad for the 2012 CONCACAF Women's U-20 Championship. Canada's second-place finish qualified the team for the 2012 FIFA U-20 Women's World Cup and Leon was recalled to the squad for the tournament in Japan. She scored a first-half hattrick as Canada opened the group stage with a 6–0 win over Argentina but defeats against Norway and North Korea eliminated the team at the group stage.

=== Senior ===
In January 2013, Leon earned her first call-up to the senior Canada national team for the friendly 2013 Four Nations Tournament. She made her senior international debut against China on January 12, 2013, playing the full 90 minutes and scoring the only goal in a 1–0 victory. She played the full 90 minutes of all three games. She appeared in 16 of the 17 matches Canada played in 2013, scoring three goals.

In 2015, Leon was named to her first major international tournament as part of the 2015 FIFA Women's World Cup hosted by Canada. She made her World Cup debut on June 6, 2015, as a 77th-minute substitute against China in the opening match of the tournament. Leon was fouled in the penalty area by Zhao Rong in stoppage time, earning Canada a penalty which was scored by Christine Sinclair to win 1–0. She played in four of the five games as Canada were eliminated by England at the quarterfinal stage.

Having struggled for form and game time at club level, John Herdman dropped Leon from international contention in 2016, first omitting her from the 2016 CONCACAF Women's Olympic Qualifying Championship and then the 2016 Summer Olympics themselves where Canada won the bronze medal match against host nation Brazil. She returned to the NWSL in 2017 and her performances with Boston earned her a recall to the national setup. She scored in three of her six appearances for Canada in 2017.

At the 2018 CONCACAF Women's Championship Leon scored six goals (including four in a game against Cuba) and finished second in tournament's golden boot race, one goal behind Alex Morgan of the United States.

On May 25, 2019, she was named to the roster for the 2019 FIFA Women's World Cup. She made three substitute appearances in France for a combined 58 minutes as Canada were eliminated at the round of 16 by Sweden.

Having been left out of the squad for the previous Olympics, Leon was named to the delayed 2020 Summer Olympics squad in August 2021. She appeared in five of six games, scoring in a 1–1 group stage draw with Great Britain. Having successfully converted a penalty in the shootout victory over Brazil in the quarterfinals, Leon stepped up to take another penalty in the gold medal match but scuffed her kick low to Hedvig Lindahl's right. Despite this, Canada won the shootout 3–2.

In 2022, Leon appeared in all five matches at the 2022 CONCACAF W Championship including one start, and scored during a 3–0 semifinal win over Jamaica. Canada lost the final 1–0 to the United States with Leon appearing as a 67th-minute substitute. Leon also played a crucial role in Canada's two September friendly matches against Australia, held in anticipation of the following year's World Cup that the latter would co-host. She scored all three Canadian goals in 1–0 and 2–1 victories over the Australians.

After what was widely deemed a difficult club season with limited playing time, there were questions about Leon's form going into the 2023 FIFA Women's World Cup. In the team's second group match against Ireland, Leon scored the game-winning goal, her first at a World Cup. This proved to be the only goal scored by a Canadian in the team's three matches in the tournament, Canada's only other goal being an own goal credited to Irish midfielder Megan Connolly. Following the team's disappointment at the World Cup, Leon made her 100th international appearance in the first match of the two-part CONCACAF Olympic qualification playoff against Jamaica. She scored her 30th international goal in stoppage time, helping Canada to a 2–0 victory.

Opening 2024 at the inaugural edition of the CONCACAF W Gold Cup, Leon scored a brace in Canada's opening group stage game against El Salvador, and then a hat trick against Paraguay in the next game. Canada reached the semi-final against the United States, and with less than a minute remaining in extra time with the Americans up 2–1, Leon was tasked with taking a penalty. She scored her sixth of the tournament, sending the game to a penalty shootout, but failed to score there, with Canada ultimately losing 3–1. She won the Golden Boot as the tournament's top scorer and was named to the Gold Cup Best XI. Media commentary subsequently remarked that Leon had "staked a claim" to the team's starting striker role following the retirement of Christine Sinclair.

Leon was called up to the Canada squad for the 2024 Summer Olympics.

== Career statistics ==
=== Club summary ===
As of November 29, 2025

Appearances and goals by club, season and competition
Club	Season	League			National cup (Note: Swiss Cup and FA Cup)		League cup (Note: FA League Cup and NWSL Challenge Cup)		Playoffs (Note: NWSL Playoffs)		Continental (Note: UEFA Champions League)		Total	
Club	Season	Division	Apps	Goals	Apps	Goals	Apps	Goals	Apps	Goals	Apps	Goals	Apps	Goals
Boston Breakers	2013	NWSL	6	1	—		—		—		—		6	1
Chicago Red Stars	2013	NWSL	10	1	—		—		—		—		10	1
Chicago Red Stars	2014	NWSL	20	1	—		—		—		—		20	1
Chicago Red Stars	2015	NWSL	5	1	—		—		0	0	—		5	1
Chicago Red Stars	Total		35	3	0	0	0	0	0	0	0	0	35	3
Western New York Flash	2016	NWSL	10	0	—		—		0	0	—		10	0
FC Zürich	2016–17	Nationalliga A	5	0	2	2	—		—		4	3	11	5
Boston Breakers	2017	NWSL	24	6	—		—		—		—		24	6
Sky Blue FC	2018	NWSL	2	0	—		—		—		—		2	0
Seattle Reign	2018	NWSL	6	0	—		—		0	0	—		6	0
West Ham United	2018–19	WSL	6	1	4	2	0	0	—		—		10	3
West Ham United	2019–20	WSL	11	5	0	0	5	1	—		—		16	6
West Ham United	2020–21	WSL	13	1	0	0	4	0	—		—		17	1
West Ham United	2021–22	WSL	13	2	2	0	1	0	—		—		16	2
West Ham United	Total		43	9	6	2	10	1	0	0	0	0	59	12
Manchester United	2022–23	WSL	5	1	1	0	3	2	—		—		9	3
Portland Thorns FC (loan)	2023	NWSL	5	0	—		2	0	—		—		7	0
Aston Villa	2023–24	WSL	18	5	1	0	3	1	—		—		22	6
Aston Villa	2024–25	WSL	11	3	1	0	3	0	—		—		15	3
Aston Villa	Total		29	8	2	0	6	1	0	0	0	0	37	9
San Diego Wave FC	2025	NWSL	26	4	—		—		1	0	—		27	4
Career total			196	32	11	4	21	4	1	0	4	3	233	43

=== International summary ===
As of match played December 2, 2025

Appearances and goals by national team and year
National team	Year	Apps	Goals
Canada	2013	16	3
Canada	2014	9	1
Canada	2015	13	1
Canada	2016	0	0
Canada	2017	6	3
Canada	2018	10	6
Canada	2019	9	1
Canada	2020	3	4
Canada	2021	12	4
Canada	2022	14	5
Canada	2023	13	3
Canada	2024	16	10
Canada	2025	11	3
Total		132	44

=== International goals ===
As of match played May 31, 2025
Scores and results list Canada's goal tally first, score column indicates score after each Leon goal.

List of international goals scored by Adriana Leon
No.	Date	Cap	Venue	Opponent	Score	Result	Competition
1	January 12, 2013	1	Yongchuan Stadium, Chongqing, China	China	1–0	1–0	2013 Four Nations Tournament
2	October 30, 2013	11	Commonwealth Stadium, Edmonton, Canada	South Korea	3–0	3–0	Friendly
3	December 12, 2013	13	Mané Garrincha, Brasília, Brazil	Scotland	1–0	2–0	2013 International Tournament of Brasilia
4	March 7, 2014	19	GSZ Stadium, Larnaca, Cyprus	Italy	2–0	3–1	2014 Cyprus Cup
5	January 13, 2015	27	Shenzhen Stadium, Futian, China	Mexico	1–0	2–1	2015 Four Nations Tournament
6	June 8, 2017	40	Winnipeg Stadium, Winnipeg, Canada	Costa Rica	3–1	3–1	Friendly
7	November 9, 2017	42	BC Place, Vancouver, Canada	United States	1–1	1–1	Friendly
8	November 28, 2017	44	Estadio Municipal de Marbella, Marbella, Spain	Norway	3–2	3–2	Friendly
9	October 8, 2018	52	H-E-B Park, Edinburg, Texas, United States	Cuba	1–0	12–0	2018 CONCACAF Women's Championship
10	October 8, 2018	52	H-E-B Park, Edinburg, Texas, United States	Cuba	3–0	12–0	2018 CONCACAF Women's Championship
11	October 8, 2018	52	H-E-B Park, Edinburg, Texas, United States	Cuba	7–0	12–0	2018 CONCACAF Women's Championship
12	October 8, 2018	52	H-E-B Park, Edinburg, Texas, United States	Cuba	9–0	12–0	2018 CONCACAF Women's Championship
13	October 11, 2018	53	Toyota Stadium, Frisco, Texas, United States	Panama	6–0	7–0	2018 CONCACAF Women's Championship
14	October 11, 2018	53	Toyota Stadium, Frisco, Texas, United States	Panama	7–0	7–0	2018 CONCACAF Women's Championship
15	May 18, 2019	56	BMO Field, Toronto, Canada	Mexico	3–0	3–0	Friendly
16	January 29, 2020	64	H-E-B Park, Edinburg, Texas, United States	Saint Kitts and Nevis	2–0	11–0	2020 CONCACAF Olympic qualifying
17	January 29, 2020	64	H-E-B Park, Edinburg, Texas, United States	Saint Kitts and Nevis	5–0	11–0	2020 CONCACAF Olympic qualifying
18	January 29, 2020	64	H-E-B Park, Edinburg, Texas, United States	Saint Kitts and Nevis	7–0	11–0	2020 CONCACAF Olympic qualifying
19	January 29, 2020	64	H-E-B Park, Edinburg, Texas, United States	Saint Kitts and Nevis	11–0	11–0	2020 CONCACAF Olympic qualifying
20	July 27, 2021	73	Kashima Stadium, Kashima, Japan	Great Britain	1–0	1–1	2020 Summer Olympics
21	October 23, 2021	77	TD Place, Ottawa, Canada	New Zealand	4–1	5–1	Friendly
22	October 23, 2021	77	TD Place, Ottawa, Canada	New Zealand	5–1	5–1	Friendly
23	October 26, 2021	78	Saputo Stadium, Montreal, Canada	New Zealand	1–0	1–0	Friendly
24	July 14, 2022	85	Estadio Universitario, Monterrey, Mexico	Jamaica	3–0	3–0	2022 CONCACAF W Championship
25	September 2, 2022	87	Lang Park, Brisbane, Australia	Australia	1–0	1–0	Friendly
26	September 6, 2022	88	Sydney Football Stadium, Sydney, Australia	Australia	1–1	2–1	Friendly
27	September 6, 2022	88	Sydney Football Stadium, Sydney, Australia	Australia	2–1	2–1	Friendly
28	November 11, 2022	91	Vila Belmiro, São Paulo, Brazil	Brazil	2–0	2–1	Friendly
29	July 26, 2023	98	Perth Rectangular Stadium, Perth, Australia	Republic of Ireland	2–1	2–1	2023 FIFA Women's World Cup
30	September 22, 2023	100	Independence Park, Kingston, Jamaica	Jamaica	2–0	2–0	2024 CONCACAF Olympic qualifying play-off
31	December 1, 2023	104	Starlight Stadium, Langford, Canada	Australia	5–0	5–0	Friendly
32	February 22, 2024	106	Shell Energy Stadium, Houston, United States	El Salvador	3–0	6–0	2024 CONCACAF W Gold Cup
33	February 22, 2024	106	Shell Energy Stadium, Houston, United States	El Salvador	4–0	6–0	2024 CONCACAF W Gold Cup
34	February 25, 2024	107	Shell Energy Stadium, Houston, United States	Paraguay	1–0	4–0	2024 CONCACAF W Gold Cup
35	February 25, 2024	107	Shell Energy Stadium, Houston, United States	Paraguay	3–0	4–0	2024 CONCACAF W Gold Cup
36	February 25, 2024	107	Shell Energy Stadium, Houston, United States	Paraguay	4–0	4–0	2024 CONCACAF W Gold Cup
37	March 6, 2024	110	Snapdragon Stadium, San Diego, United States	United States	2–2	2–2 (a.e.t.) (1–3 p)	2024 CONCACAF W Gold Cup
38	April 9, 2024	112	Lower.com Field, Columbus, United States	United States	1–0	2–2 (4–5 p)	2024 SheBelieves Cup
39	April 9, 2024	112	Lower.com Field, Columbus, United States	United States	2–2	2–2 (4–5 p)	2024 SheBelieves Cup
40	June 1, 2024	113	Stade Saputo, Montréal, Canada	Mexico	1–0	2–0	Friendly
41	December 3, 2024	121	Pinatar Arena, San Pedro del Pinatar, Spain	South Korea	5–1	5–1	Friendly
42	February 22, 2025	123	Pinatar Arena, San Pedro del Pinatar, Spain	Mexico	2–0	2–0	2025 Pinatar Cup
43	May 31, 2025	144	Princess Auto Stadium, Winnipeg, Canada	Haiti	1–0	4–1	Friendly
44	May 31, 2025	144	Princess Auto Stadium, Winnipeg, Canada	Haiti	2–0	4–1	Friendly

== Honours ==
Notre Dame Fighting Irish

- NCAA Women's Soccer Championship: 2010

Florida Gators

- Southeastern Conference regular season: 2012
- SEC Women's Soccer Tournament: 2012

West Ham United

- Women's FA Cup runner-up: 2019

Canada

- Summer Olympic Games: 2021
- CONCACAF W Championship runner-up: 2018, 2022

Individual

- CONCACAF W Gold Cup Golden Boot: 2024
- CONCACAF W Gold Cup Best XI: 2024

== See also ==
- List of women's footballers with 100 or more international caps
