= Racing Louisville FC (USL W League) =

American women's soccer club

- Full name: Racing Louisville Football Club
- Founded: January 18, 2022; 3 years ago
- Stadium: Lynn Family Sports Vision & Training Center; Louisville, Kentucky
- Owner(s): Soccer Holdings, LLC
- Chairman: John Neace
- Head coach: Kiley Polk and Shaun Francis
- League: USL W League
- 2024: 4th of 5 Valley Division
- Website: https://www.racingloufc.com/
Home colors	Away colors

Racing Louisville FC is an amateur women's soccer team that plays in the USL W League. It is affiliated and shares ownership with the eponymous professional team Racing Louisville FC, which competes in the National Women's Soccer League (NWSL).

== History ==
In January 2022, NWSL club Racing Louisville FC added an amateur team to compete in the newly formed USL W League, becoming the first NWSL club to do so. This followed the club's academy opening in 2020 and completed its developmental pathway from youth soccer to top-division professional play. The club hired an all-female technical staff to lead the team, with Kincaid Schmidt as its inaugural head coach and former NWSL player Libby Stout as assistant coach.

In the 2023 USL W League season, Racing finished in a tie on points for first place in the Valley division with eventual national championship finalists Indy Eleven with a greater goal differential, but second due to the first tiebreaker being head-to-head record and did not advance to the conference playoffs. The team's only loss and draw on its 8–1–1 season record were against Indy.

== Stadium ==
Racing Louisville FC has played its USL W League matches at the Lynn Family Sports Vision & Training Center, which also serves as the parent club's training facility, since its inception.

== Players ==
Most of Racing's W League squad are drawn from colleges and Racing's youth academy. The professional Racing Louisville club has signed players from its W League club, including Isabella Beletic and Allison Whitfield in 2022. Racing Academy and W League player Ella Sanchez was a non-roster invitee to the professional team's 2023 preseason. Racing's Emily Madril was one of 19 W League players to sign a professional contract, with Orlando Pride, after the league's inaugural season.

== Staff ==
As of June 6, 2025.

Technical
Head coach	Kiley Polk
Head coach	Shaun Francis
Assistant coach	Libby Stout

=== Coaching history ===
- 2022: Kincaid Schmidt
- 2023: Callie McKinney
- 2024: Callie McKinney
- 2025: Kiley Polk and Shaun Francis

== Year-by-year ==
As of April 1, 2025.

Season	League	Division	Regular season									Playoffs
Season	League	Division	P	W	D	L	GF	GA	GD	Pts.	Pos.	Playoffs
2022	USL W	Great Lakes	12	6	3	3	26	15	+11	21	3rd	Did not qualify
2023	USL W	Valley	10	8	1	1	42	4	+38	25	2nd (Note: Tied for first on points with Indy Eleven, but lost the first tiebreaker on head-to-head record.)	Did not qualify
2024	USL W	Valley	10	4	2	4	32	17	+15	24	4th	Did not qualify
