= List of drafts held by the NWSL =

The following is a list of drafts held by National Women's Soccer League (NWSL), with a brief description of each.

== Preseason 2013 (inaugural) ==
- 2013 NWSL College Draft: Held January 18 at the annual NSCAA convention, this year in Indianapolis, the draft allowed all eight teams to draft four players who had completed their college eligibility. While they had originally announced that the draft would be in snake format with randomly determined order, NWSL announced several days before the draft that the order would be the same in each of the four rounds, with the order semi-randomly determined with weighting based on evaluation of the allocation results.
- 2013 NWSL Supplemental Draft: After a limited free agency period, NWSL pooled remaining players who were identified by the teams to be distributed via draft. Each team submitted 8–10 player names to the draft pool, with players picked over six rounds.
- 2013 Preseason Waiver Draft: Drafted players who were waived by their teams were made available for other teams. Six players were available: Casey Berrier, Whitney Berry, Heather Cooke, Tina DiMartino, Jaclyn Logue, and Lauren Alkek. The only selection was of Alkek, originally drafted by Boston, who was selected by Western New York.

== Offseason 2013–14 ==
- 2013 Postseason Waiver Draft: Players who were waived by their teams were available for other teams to pick up. Of the 11 players available, only Nikki Marshall (previously of Portland) was selected by Washington.
- 2014 NWSL Expansion Draft
- 2014 NWSL College Draft

== Offseason 2014–15 ==
- 2014 Postseason Waiver Wire: Players who were waived by their teams were available for other teams to pick up. Twelve players were made available, two-thirds of them coming from teams that finished in the bottom three. FC Kansas City selected Rafaelle Souza, Portland Thorns FC selected Danesha Adams, and the Washington Spirit selected Lydia Williams and Joanna Lohman.
- 2015 NWSL College Draft

== Offseason 2015–16 ==
- 2015 Postseason Waiver Wire: Players who were waived by their teams were available for other teams to pick up. Originally announced for October 12, the Waiver Wire process was delayed to October 21–22, presumably to allow for the October 20 announcement of expansion with the Orlando Pride, who were granted top tie-break in the process. Of the 8 players available, all from non-playoff teams, only Brittany Bock (an Illinois native previously of Houston) was selected by Chicago.
- 2015 NWSL Expansion Draft
- 2016 NWSL College Draft
- 2016 NWSL Distribution Draft: Players who were no longer allocated and whose former teams did not offer a new contract were made available in the Distribution Draft, held on March 31. Of the nine players whose NWSL rights were available, only Verónica Pérez and Arianna Romero were selected, both by Seattle Reign FC.

== Offseason 2016–17 ==
- 2016 Postseason Re-Entry Wire: Players who were waived by their teams, or whose contracts were allowed to lapse, were available for other teams to pick up on the re-entry wire (previously known as the waiver wire) on October 19. Of the 13 players available, the only player selected was Sinead Farrelly, who was left on the wire by the Boston Breakers and selected by Seattle Reign FC.
- 2017 NWSL College Draft

== Offseason 2017–18 ==
- 2017 Postseason Re-Entry Wire: Eight players were waived by their clubs; none were selected.
- 2018 NWSL College Draft
- 2018 NWSL Dispersal Draft

== Offseason 2018–19 ==
- 2018 Postseason Re-Entry Wire: Seven players were waived by their clubs; none were selected.
- 2019 NWSL College Draft

== Offseason 2019–20 ==
- 2019 Re-Entry Wire: 19 players were made available by their clubs on the Re-Entry Wire; five were selected.
- 2020 NWSL College Draft

== Offseason 2020–21 ==
- 2020 Re-Entry Wire: Eight players were available for selection; one was selected.
- 2020 NWSL Expansion Draft
- 2021 NWSL Draft

== Offseason 2021–22 ==
- 2022 NWSL Expansion Draft
- 2022 NWSL Draft

== Offseason 2022–23 ==
Per the collective bargaining agreement between the NWSL and the NWSL Players Association, the 2022–23 offseason included the first-ever free agency period in league history. Pending free agents could begin negotiating with teams on August 26, 2022, and signing new contracts on November 15, 2022.

- 2023 NWSL Draft

== Offseason 2023–24 ==
- 2024 NWSL Expansion Draft
- 2024 NWSL Draft

== See also ==
- NWSL Draft
- NWSL federation players
- NWSL records and statistics
