= 2018 NWSL dispersal draft =

The 2018 NWSL Dispersal Draft was held by the National Women's Soccer League on January 30, 2018, after the Boston Breakers ceased operations on January 28, 2018. The draft order is determined using a random weighted draw based on teams' playoffs qualification in the 2017 NWSL season.

Eligible players include Boston's contracted players, 2018 NWSL College Draft selections, players on its Discovery List, and all other players whose NWSL rights were held by Boston. Eligible players who opt out of the draft would not be eligible to play in the 2018 NWSL season.

Contracted players and 2018 draftees, if selected, will not count against a team's roster size limit, salary cap, or international player limit for the 2018 NWSL season. Any players who opted to participate in the draft but were not selected immediately become discovery eligible.

== Available players for selection ==
Announced on January 29, 2018.

=== Contracted players ===
No.	Position	Nation	Player
—	FW	GHA	Elizabeth Addo
25	MF	USA	Morgan Andrews
2	DF	CAN	Allysha Chapman
33	FW	USA	Hayley Dowd
9	FW	ENG	Natasha Dowie
3	DF	USA	Brooke Elby
17	DF	USA	Amanda Frisbie
8	DF	USA	Julie King
11	MF	USA	Rose Lavelle
19	FW	CAN	Adriana Leon
7	DF	SWE	Lotta Ökvist
22	FW	USA	Ifeoma Onumonu
4	DF	USA	Megan Oyster
15	GK	USA	Sammy Jo Prudhomme
21	FW	USA	Midge Purce
26	MF	USA	Angela Salem
14	GK	USA	Abby Smith
23	FW	USA	Katie Stengel
18	FW	USA	Tiffany Weimer
20	DF	USA	Christen Westphal
10	MF	NZL	Rosie White

=== 2018 draftees ===
No.	Position	Nation	Player
—	MF	USA	Joanna Boyles
—	FW	USA	Savannah McCaskill
—	MF	USA	Ashton Miller
—	DF	USA	Elizabeth Wenger

=== Retired players' rights ===
No.	Position	Nation	Player
—	MF	POR	Amanda DaCosta
—	MF	USA	Lindsay Elston
—	DF	USA	Whitney Engen
—	DF	USA	Mollie Pathman
—	MF	SWE	Louise Schillgard
—	FW	AUS	Kyah Simon

== Player selections ==
Conducted on January 30, 2018.

=== Round 1 ===
Pick	Drafting Team	Player
1	Washington Spirit^{1}	Rose Lavelle
2	Sky Blue FC^{1}	Savannah McCaskill
3	Seattle Reign FC	Megan Oyster
4	Portland Thorns FC	Margaret Purce
5	Utah Royals FC	Abby Smith
6	Houston Dash	Kyah Simon
7	Chicago Red Stars	Rosie White
8	Seattle Reign FC^{2}	Elizabeth Addo
9	North Carolina Courage	Julie King

=== Round 2 ===
Pick	Drafting Team	Player
1	North Carolina Courage	Allysha Chapman
2	Seattle Reign FC^{2}	Morgan Andrews
3	Chicago Red Stars	Ashton Miller
4	Houston Dash	Lotta Ökvist
5	Utah Royals FC	Katie Stengel
6	Portland Thorns FC	Angela Salem
7	Seattle Reign FC	Christen Westphal
8	Washington Spirit	Elizabeth Wenger
9	Sky Blue FC	Adriana Leon

=== Round 3 ===
Pick	Drafting Team	Player
1	Sky Blue FC	Amanda Frisbie
2	Washington Spirit	Tiffany Weimer
3	Seattle Reign FC	Lindsay Elston
4	Portland Thorns FC	Ifeoma Onumonu
5	Utah Royals FC	Brooke Elby
6	Houston Dash	Sammy Jo Prudhomme
7	Chicago Red Stars	Joanna Boyles
8	Orlando Pride	PASS
9	North Carolina Courage	PASS

=== Round 4 ===
Pick	Drafting Team	Player
1	Chicago Red Stars	Whitney Engen
2	Houston Dash	PASS
3	Utah Royals FC	Amanda DaCosta
4	Portland Thorns FC	PASS
5	Seattle Reign FC	PASS
6	Washington Spirit	PASS
7	Sky Blue FC	PASS

=== Round 5 ===
Pick	Drafting Team	Player
1	Utah Royals FC	PASS
2	Chicago Red Stars	PASS

== Trades ==
Notes

1. Sky Blue FC traded the No. 1 overall pick in the dispersal draft to the Washington Spirit in return for the No. 2 overall pick in the dispersal draft and a conditional first-round and natural second pick in the 2019 NWSL College Draft.
2. The Orlando Pride traded the No. 8 and No. 11 picks in the dispersal draft to Seattle Reign FC in exchange for Seattle's natural first-round pick in the 2019 NWSL College Draft.

== See also ==
- List of NWSL drafts
- 2018 National Women's Soccer League season
