= Sammy Jo Prudhomme =

American soccer player (born 1993)

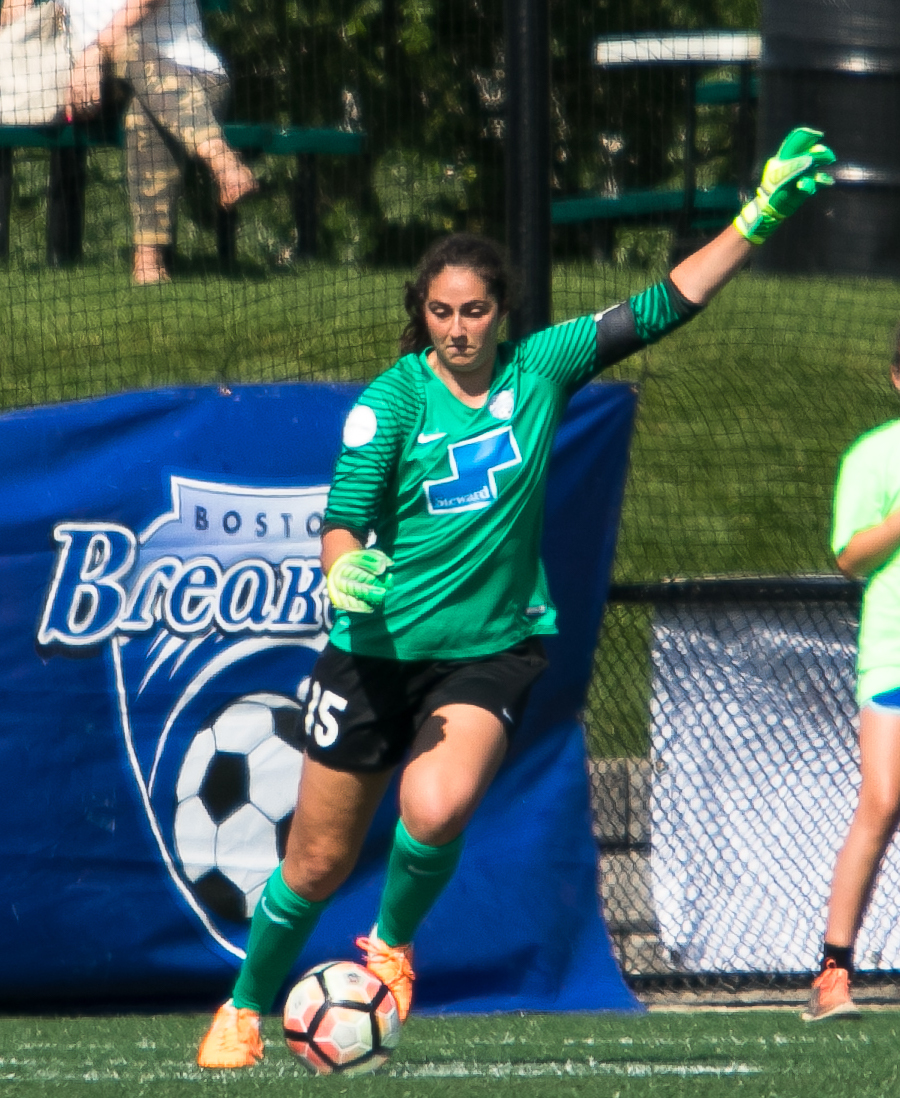
- Prudhomme playing for Boston Breakers in 2017

Personal information
- Full name: Samantha Jo Prudhomme
- Date of birth: October 25, 1993 (age 33)
- Place of birth: Aliso Viejo, California
- Height: 5 ft 10 in (1.78 m)
- Position: Goalkeeper

Team information
- Current team: Loyola Greyhounds (assistant)

College career
Years	Team	Apps	(Gls)
2012–2013	Oregon State Beavers	31	(0)
2014–2016	USC Trojans	48	(0)

Senior career*
Years	Team	Apps	(Gls)
2017	Boston Breakers	5	(0)
2018	Houston Dash	0	(0)
2019	Washington Spirit	0	(0)
2019	Reign FC	0	(0)

Managerial career
- 2020–: Loyola Greyhounds (assistant)
- * Club domestic league appearances and goals as of July 15, 2019

Samantha Jo Prudhomme (born October 25, 1993) is an American soccer coach and former professional player who is an assistant coach for the Loyola Greyhounds women's soccer team.

Prudhomme played as a goalkeeper for Reign FC, Washington Spirit, Houston Dash, and Boston Breakers in the National Women's Soccer League (NWSL).

== Early life ==
Born in Torrance, CA and raised in Aliso Viejo, California, Prudhomme attended Aliso Niguel High School, where she lettered all four years and started her Junior and Senior seasons, became the MVP and Team Captain for both years. Her senior year she led her team to a CIF championship, State Championship and ranked #1 high school soccer team by ESPN. Won CIF women's soccer player of the year 2012. She is the daughter of Jon and Jo Beth Prudhomme, and has one brother, Nick.

Prudhomme attended Aliso Niguel High School, where she lettered all four years and started her Junior and Senior seasons, became the MVP and Team Captain for both years. Her senior year she led her team to a CIF championship, State Championship and ranked #1 high school soccer team by ESPN. Prudhomme was named CIF women's soccer player of the year 2012, as well as, Orange County Register's Player of the Year 2012.

== College career ==
=== Oregon State, 2012–2013 ===
Prudhomme began her college career as an Oregon State Beaver in 2012. During her two seasons with the Beavers, Prudhomme played a total of 31 matches, giving up 41 goals, producing 188 saves, and had a combined record of 11–15–5.

=== USC Trojans, 2014–2016 ===
Prudhomme transferred to the University of Southern California after her Sophomore season at Oregon State, having been recruited by USC, and citing frustration with the Oregon State program. During her first season with the program she helped convert USC into a top PAC-12 team At the beginning of second season she captured ESPNW Player of the week honors Combined seasons with USC, Prudhomme played a total of 48 matches, allowing 27 total goals, producing 175 saves, 25 shutouts, and led the Trojans to the NCAA Championship in her senior season. That year, she was named the 2016 Pac-12 Goalkeeper of the Year, and to the Pac-12 First Team.

== Club career ==
=== PALI Blues, 2014 ===
Team Won National Championship and Prudhomme won W-league Goalkeeper with lowest GAA for the W-league's last season 2014

=== So Cal FC, 2015 ===
Prudhomme lead team to the Finals in their first season as a WPSL team

=== Boston Breakers, 2017 ===
Prudhomme was selected by the Boston Breakers with the 31st overall pick in the 2017 NWSL College Draft. She signed with the team on April 4, 2017. Prudhomme started five games in her rookie year, filling in for starting goalkeeper Abby Smith when she was injured. She helped the Breakers stop a seven-game losing streak. Prudhomme was the first Breaker to record three consecutive shutouts and broke the club record for shutout minutes.

=== Houston Dash, 2018 ===
After the Breakers folded ahead of the 2018 NWSL season, the NWSL held a dispersal draft to distribute Breakers players across the league. Her rights were selected 24th overall by the Houston Dash. Prudhomme didn't appear in any games for Houston in 2018 as Jane Campbell played every minute of the season in goal.

Prudhomme was waived by the Houston Dash prior to the 2019 NWSL season so she could join the Washington Spirit preseason camp as a non-roster invitee.

=== Washington Spirit, 2019 ===
Prudhomme was named to Washington's final roster ahead of the 2019 NWSL season.

=== Reign FC, 2019 ===
On July 15, 2019, Prudhomme was acquired by Reign FC in a trade with Washington Spirit in exchange for Elise Kellond-Knight.

On February 13, 2020, Prudhomme announced her retirement from professional soccer.

== Honors ==
USC Trojans

- NCAA Division I Women's Soccer Championship: 2016

Individual

- Pac-12 Conference Goalkeeper of the Year: 2016
