= Amanda Frisbie =

American soccer player

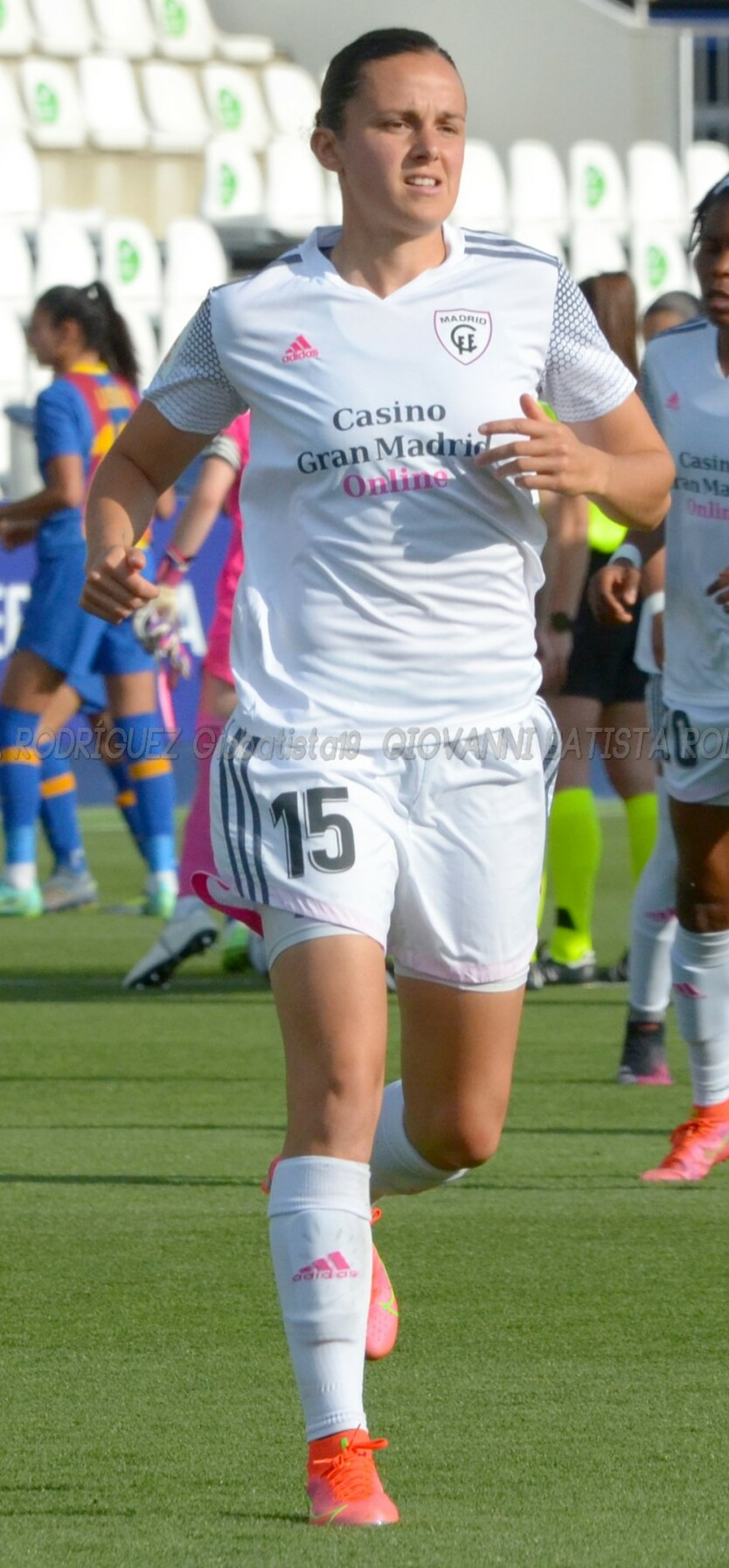
- Frisbie playing for Madrid CFF in 2021

Personal information
- Full name: Amanda Paige Frisbie
- Date of birth: May 29, 1992 (age 34)
- Place of birth: North Richland Hills, Texas, U.S.
- Height: 5 ft 8 in (1.73 m)
- Position: Defender

College career
Years	Team	Apps	(Gls)
2010–2013	Portland Pilots	71	(31)

Senior career*
Years	Team	Apps	(Gls)
2014	Seattle Reign FC	0	(0)
2015	Western New York Flash	4	(1)
2016	FC Kansas City	3	(0)
2016	Stjarnan Women	9	(0)
2017	Boston Breakers	12	(0)
2017–18	→ Perth Glory (loan)	12	(0)
2018	Sky Blue	17	(0)
2019	Klepp	9	(1)
2019–2021	Madrid CFF	27	(1)
2021–2022	Atlético Madrid	8	(0)
2022–2023	Damaiense	9	(0)
2023	Brann	15	(1)
2023–2024	Levante Las Planas	11	(0)
2024–2025	DC Power FC	0	(0)
Total		136	(4)

International career
2014	United States U23		
- * Club domestic league appearances and goals as of June 18, 2025

Amanda Paige Frisbie (born May 29, 1992) is an American former professional soccer player who played as a defender.

She previously played for the Boston Breakers, Seattle Reign, Western New York Flash, FC Kansas City, and Sky Blue FC of the American National Women's Soccer League; Stjarnan Women of the Úrvalsdeild kvenna league in Iceland; Perth Glory in the Australian W-League; Madrid CFF, Atlético Madrid Femenino, Levante Las Planas of Spain's Primera División; Damaiense of Portugal's Campeonato Nacional Feminino; and DC Power FC of the USL Super League.

== Early life ==
Born and raised in North Richland Hills, Texas, a suburb located approximately 35 minutes west of Dallas, Frisbie attended McKinney High School where she played soccer her freshman and sophomore years before dedicating her time fully to club team, the Dallas Texans. With the Texans, Frisbie won consecutive state cup championships from 2008 to 2009 and three league championships from 2007 to 2009. During her freshman year at McKinney, she led the freshmen on the team with 14 goals and eight assists. The team won the district championship and Frisbie was named the team and district most valuable player. During her sophomore year, her 27 goals and 17 assists set a new single-season record. She was named to the 2007 State All-Region Team, 2008 NSCAA Youth All-Region Team, and ESPN RISE All-Area Team in 2009 and 2010.

From 2005 to 2009, Frisbie played for the North Texas State Team and participated in the regional Olympic Development Program (ODP). She helped the team win a regional championship as well as the United States Youth Soccer Association national championship in 2009.

== College career ==
Frisbie attended the University of Portland from 2010 to 2013, where she played soccer for the Portland Pilots. She scored her first career goal during a match against the University of Washington during her freshman season and finished the year having scored five goals in five shots. During her sophomore year, her three game-winning goals tied for the team lead. During her junior season, she started all 21 games and led the West Coast Conference (WCC) in goals (12) and points (33). Her nine assists also tied for the lead. During the team's 5–0 defeat of Fresno State, Frisbie scored four goals and became the 16th player in the team's history to do so.

During her senior year, Frisbie was a Hermann Trophy semifinalist and was named the 2013 WCC Defender of the Year after moving to the center back position from forward. She helped the team record nine shutouts and finished second on the team with eight goals, four of them game-winning goals. Frisbie was named the WCC's Women's Soccer Play of the Week for the week of September 30, 2013 after scoring three goals, including two game-winning goals and providing an assist. She was named a semifinalist for the Hermann Trophy. During a National Women's Soccer League pre-season match against the Portland Thorns FC, Frisbie scored the first goal of the match during the collegiate team's 2–1 defeat to the professional team.

== Club career ==
On January 17, 2014, Frisbie was selected in the first round (seventh overall pick) of the 2014 NWSL College Draft by Seattle Reign FC. Later that month, the Reign signed her to the team. Of her signing, head coach Laura Harvey said, "We wanted to sign Amanda early to demonstrate our commitment to helping her develop into a key part of our squad. I expect Amanda to be an integral part of our season in 2014 and believe she has the capacity to be an impact player in the league in the future." Frisbie missed the 2014 season due to injury, but was re-signed by the Reign for the 2015 season.

Frisbie was traded to the Western New York Flash on March 30, 2015, along with Sydney Leroux Dwyer for Amber Brooks and the rights to Abby Wambach.

Frisbie was traded to FC Kansas City in November 2015, was waived in July of the next year and immediately signed with Iceland's Stjarnan Women.

Frisbie was signed to Stjarnan Women in July 2016 and helped lead the club back to a league championship in September.

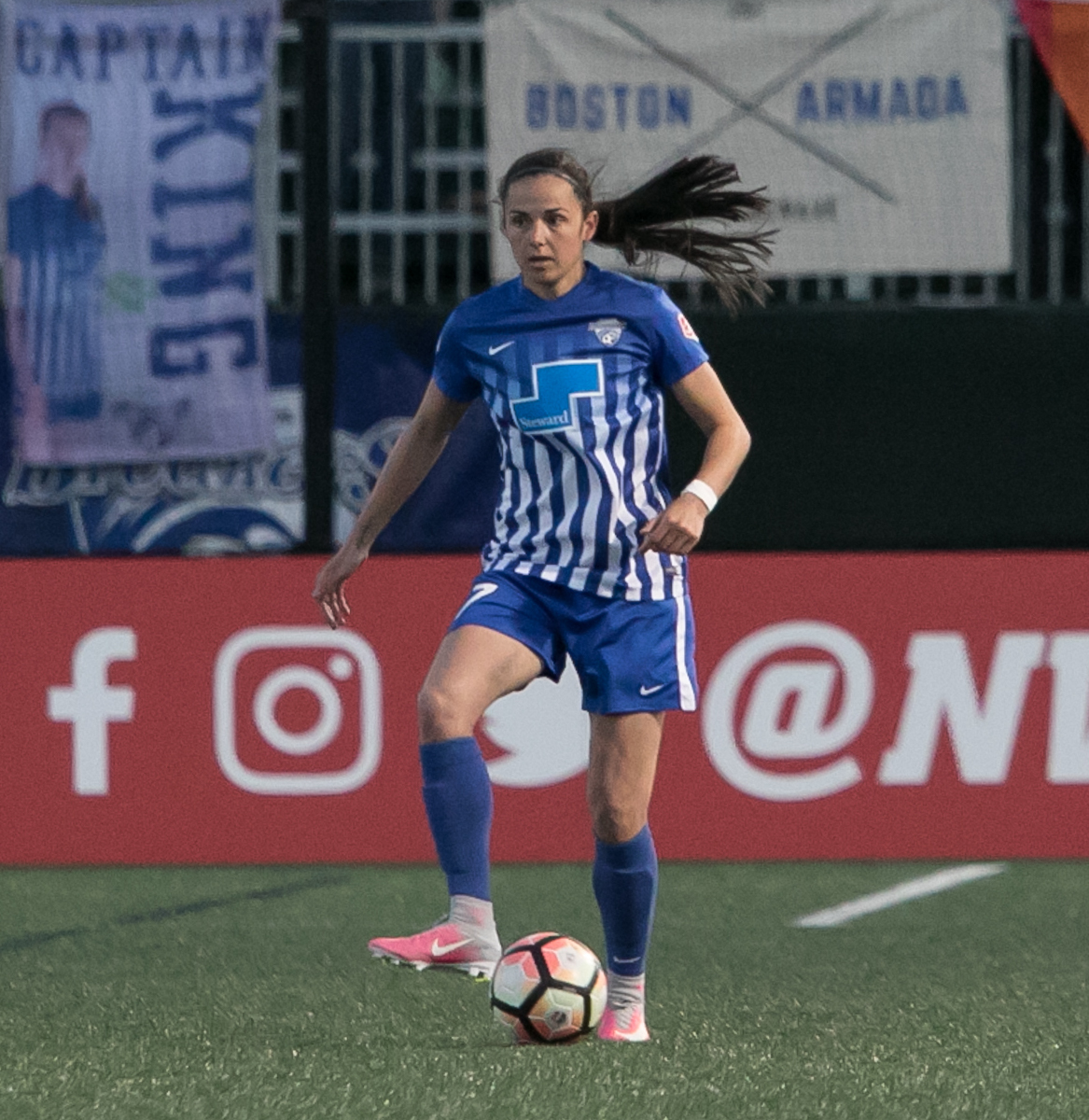
Frisbie with the Boston Breakers in 2017

The Boston Breakers announced on January 10, 2017, that the club had signed Frisbie as a discovery player for the 2017 season. The team folded before the 2018 season.

Frisbie was signed by Perth Glory for the 2017–18 W-League season, on loan from the Boston Breakers.

Frisbie was selected 19th overall by Sky Blue FC in the 2018 NWSL Dispersal Draft on January 30, 2018. The club and Frisbie mutually terminated her employment on January 24, 2019.

On November 14, 2018, Frisbie signed with Norwegian Toppserien club Klepp IL.

Frisbie played with Spanish Liga Iberdrola club Madrid CFF from 2019 to 2021. On April 3, 2021, she scored a long-range goal in the 73rd minute of a 2–4 loss to UDG Tenerife.

On July 8, 2021, Liga Iberdrola club Atlético Madrid announced that it had acquired Frisbie by transfer and signed her to a two-year contract. She suffered a knee injury and returned on May 7, 2022.

Frisbie played for Portuguese Liga BPI club Damaiense in 2022.

In January 2023, Frisbie signed a contract with Norwegian Toppserien club SK Brann through the end of the year, as reinforcement after an Achilles tendon injury to Natasha Anasi. The move reunited her with her former manager at Klepp IL, Olli Harder.

On September 4, 2024, Frisbie returned to the United States, signing a contract with DC Power FC ahead of the inaugural USL Super League season.

Frisbie announced her retirement from professional soccer on June 25, 2025.

== Honors ==
- Besta deild kvenna: 2016

== See also ==
- List of University of Portland alumni
