= Abby Smith =

American soccer player (born 1993)

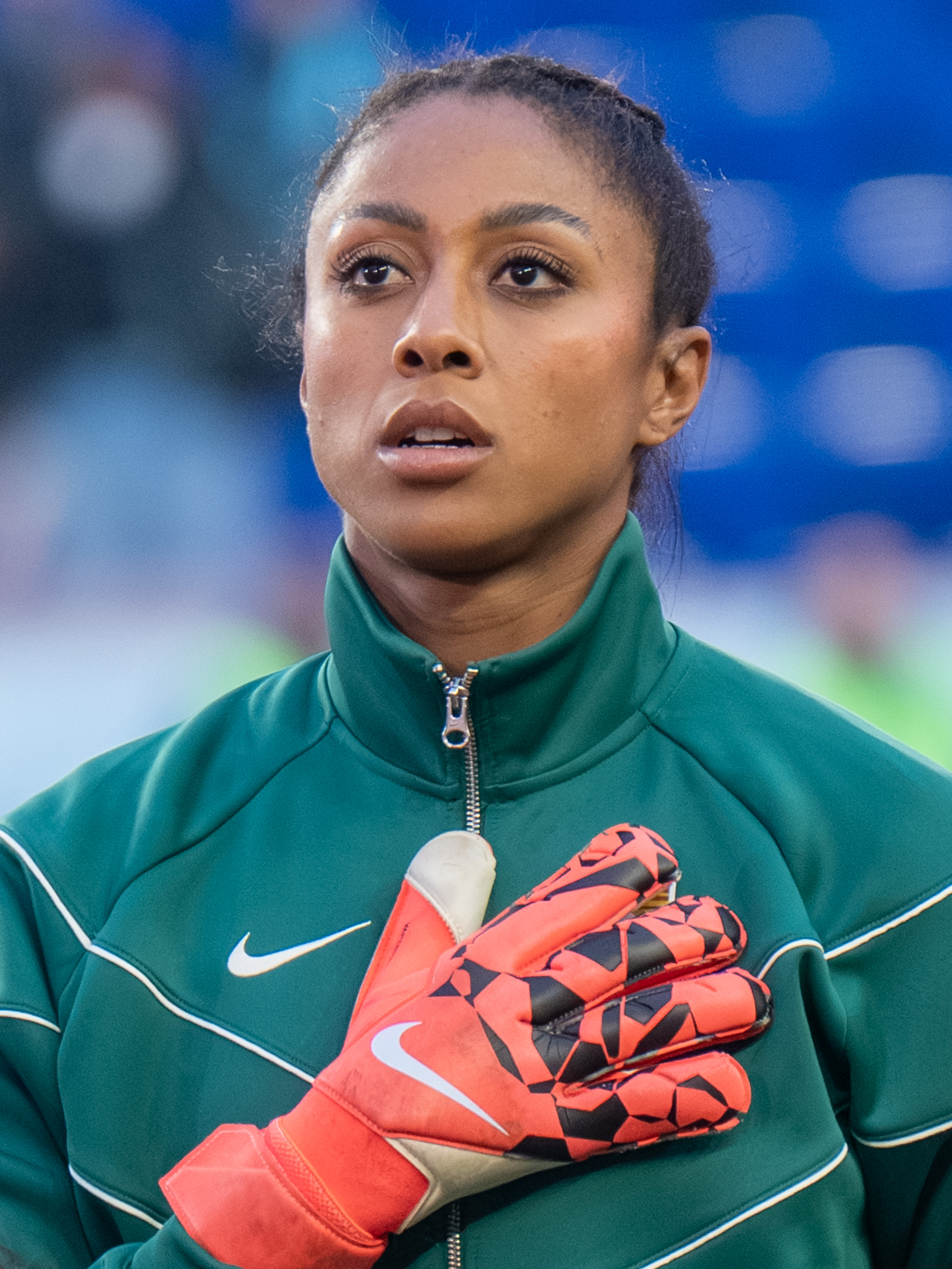
- Smith with the Denver Summit in 2026

Personal information
- Full name: Abigail Mackenzie Smith
- Date of birth: October 4, 1993 (age 33)
- Place of birth: Portland, Oregon, United States
- Height: 5 ft 9 in (1.75 m)
- Position: Goalkeeper

Team information
- Current team: Denver Summit
- Number: 1

Youth career
- 2005–2012: Dallas Texans

College career
Years	Team	Apps	(Gls)
2012–2015	Texas Longhorns	72	(3)

Senior career*
Years	Team	Apps	(Gls)
2016–2017	Boston Breakers	21	(0)
2018–2020	Utah Royals	20	(0)
2019–2020	→ WS Wanderers (loan)	9	(0)
2021	Kansas City	1	(0)
2021–2022	Portland Thorns	1	(0)
2023–2024	NJ/NY Gotham FC	14	(0)
2025	Houston Dash	8	(0)
2026–	Denver Summit	27	(0)

International career^{‡}
2009–2010	United States U17		
2011–2012	United States U20		
2013–2016	United States U23		
- * Club domestic league appearances and goals as of 06:41, November 8, 2026 (UTC) ‡ National team caps and goals as of June 7, 2018

Abigail Mackenzie Smith (born October 4, 1993) is an American professional soccer player who plays as a goalkeeper for Denver Summit FC of the National Women's Soccer League (NWSL).

Smith played college soccer for the Texas Longhorns and was drafted by Boston Breakers in the third round of the 2016 NWSL College Draft. She has also played for the Utah Royals, Kansas City Current, Portland Thorns, NJ/NY Gotham FC, and Houston Dash in the NWSL. She was part of two NWSL Championship–winning teams in the Thorns in 2022 and Gotham in 2023.

She represented the United States on the under-17, under-20, under-23 teams.

== Early life ==
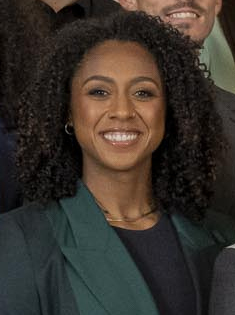
Smith at the White House in 2024

Raised in Plano, Texas, Smith began playing soccer in elementary school. She played club soccer for the Dallas Texans 94 Red Soccer Club from 2005 to 2012.During the 2011–12 season, the team ranked first nationally in the ESPNHS Elite Clubs National League. She captained the team for four years and helped the team win the Nike Cup in Portland, Oregon and Gothia Cup in Gothenburg, Sweden in 2008.

Smith participated in the Olympic Development Program (ODP) from 2005 to 2010 and was a member of the Region III ODP Team. She played in the US Youth Soccer (USYS) Region III championship finals in 2009 and earned the USYS ODP National Championship Golden Glove.

Smith attended Plano West High School and was the starting goalkeeper on the girls' soccer team before graduating a semester early to facilitate travel with the national team. She was twice named a National Soccer Coaches Association of America Youth All-America honoree in 2010 and 2011 and was named Parade Magazine All-American in 2010. Top Drawer Soccer ranked her as the 13th-best player in the United States and the second-best player in Texas. ESPNHS ranked her fifth in college prospects across the nation.

== College career ==
Smith attended the University of Texas where she played for the Texas Longhorns from 2012 to 2015. During her freshman year, she was the starting goalkeeper in the last 12 matches of the season allowing 8 goals and making 34 saves. She set a new record for a Texas rookie goalkeeper for lowest goals-against average at 0.63 – last set in 2001 and tied the school record for shutouts by a freshman with seven. Smith's .810 save percentage ranked first in the Big 12 Conference and second in overall goals against average (GAA). Smith helped lead a defensive line that tied the regular season record for fewest goals allowed (five) in the Big 12 Conference. She was named the Soccer America Goalkeeper of the Week following a 1–0 shutout against Oklahoma State on October 5, 2012.

During her sophomore season, Smith was the starting goalkeeper in all 20 matches and scored her first career goal. With a 12–6–2 overall record, she recorded a 0.78 goals-against average (GAA) and made 72 saves with eight shutouts. She was named Big 12 Conference Defensive Player of the Week on September 10 after helping defeat Samford University and Illinois State University as well as making a game-saving penalty kick stop in the 87th minute of one of the matches. She scored her first career goal off a 50-yard free kick. In 2014, Smith recorded nine shutouts tying the school record for the most in a single season. Her 24 career shutouts ranked second in school history. She was named to the All Big-12 Conference first team. Smith finished her junior season with a 0.92 GAA and her 98 saves ranked first in the Big 12 Conference.

During her senior season, Smith was a national finalist for the 2015 Senior Class Award and was named to the All-Big 12 Conference First-Team Academic team. She was named ESPNW Player of the Week for week 9 on October 21, 2015 and Big 12 Defensive Player of the Week twice in October. Smith ranked first in the Big 12 Conference for total saves with 96 and saves-per-match with 5.33. Her 30th career shutout on October 30 set a new school career shutout record. She scored her third career goal (a game-winner) on a 90-plus-yard punt against the University of Miami.

== Club career ==
=== Boston Breakers, 2016–2017 ===
Smith was drafted by Boston Breakers in the third round of the 2016 NWSL College Draft. She signed with Boston in April 2016. Smith suffered a season-ending injury to her right knee, straining her ACL and tearing her patellar tendon during the second game of the season in May 2016.

Smith rehabilitated during the offseason and won the starting job at the beginning of the 2017 season. In June 2017, she required a platelet-rich plasma injection in her previously injured knee, forcing her to miss time, but she still appeared in 19 games for the Breakers.

=== Utah Royals, 2018–2020 ===
After the Boston Breakers folded prior to the 2018 NWSL season, Smith was selected by the Utah Royals with the 5th pick in the Breakers Dispersal Draft on January 30, 2018. Though she had fully recovered from her knee injury prior to the start of the 2018 season, Smith continued to split time in goal, appearing 17 games for the Royals while Nicole Barnhart started in the remaining eight league games. After leading the Royals to their first franchise win on May 5 and notching three shutouts, Smith was named to the NWSL Team of the Month in May. She signed a new contract with the team in March 2019, but didn't make a single appearance for the Royals during the 2019 season.

==== Loan to Western Sydney Wanderers, 2019–2020 ====
In search of game time during the NWSL offseason, Smith went on loan to the Western Sydney Wanderers. She appeared in eight matches for the Australian side, keeping three clean sheets and helping the club to its first appearance in the W-League finals.

=== KC NWSL, 2021 ===
After the sale of the Utah Royals, the full roster was transferred to KC NWSL. While in Kansas, she split time with Nicole Barnhart until Barnhart was released by the team in July 2021. The following month, Smith was traded to the Portland Thorns in return for Adrianna Franch, a Kansas City native. Smith made six league appearances for Kansas City.

=== Portland Thorns FC, 2021–2022 ===
Smith saw no action with the Portland Thorns in the 2021 season and played one league match and two Challenge Cup matches for the Thorns in 2022. The Thorns finished the season in second place and won the 2022 NWSL Championship. Following the completion of the 2022 NWSL season, Smith was part of the league's first class of free agents.

=== NJ/NY Gotham FC, 2023–2024 ===
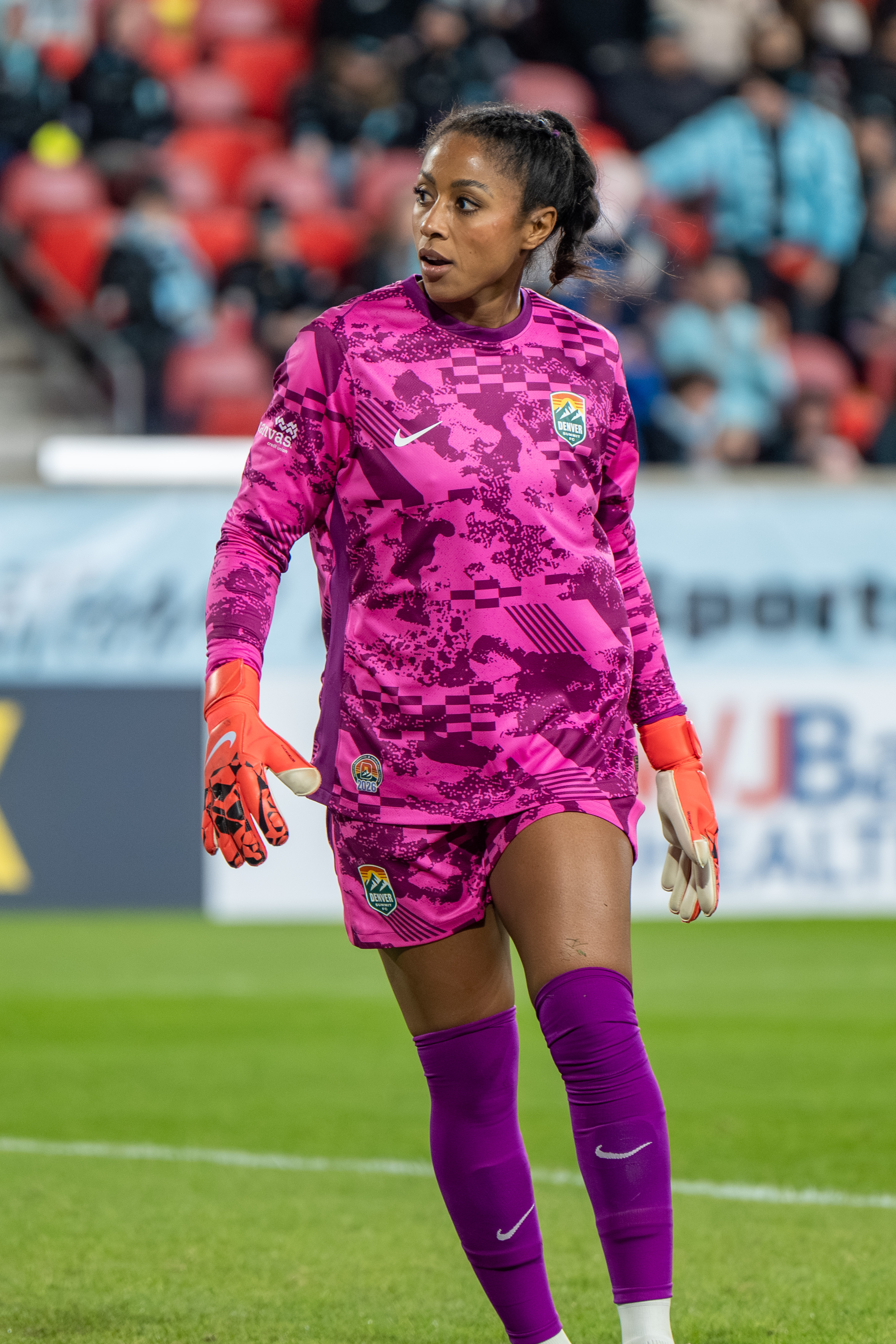
Abby Smith with the Denver Summit in 2026

NJ/NY Gotham FC announced a three-year contract with Smith on November 28, 2022. She started in 15 league matches, keeping four clean sheets and winning Team of the Month honors in May before suffering a season ending injury during a 2–1 win against the San Diego Wave on August 19, 2023. Gotham finished out the season with Mandy Haught in goal, claiming six place and winning the 2023 NWSL Championship. On October 25, 2024, Smith returned to the pitch 433 days after her injury, coming on as a substitute in the 2024 NWSL x Liga MX Femenil Summer Cup Final against Kansas City Current.

=== Houston Dash, 2025 ===
On January 15, 2025, the Houston Dash acquired Smith in exchange for US$20,000 in intraleague transfer funds.

=== Denver Summit, 2026– ===
On December 3, 2025, NWSL expansion team Denver Summit signed Smith to a two-year contract with the mutual option for another year.

== International career ==
Smith has represented the United States on the under-17, under-20, and under-23 national teams. She was called up to the USWNT for friendlies in May 2017 and March 2018, but has yet to receive a cap.

== Honors ==
NJ/NY Gotham FC

- NWSL Championship: 2023

Portland Thorns FC

- NWSL Championship: 2022

Individual

- NWSL Player of the Week: Week 7, 2023
- NWSL Team of the Month: May 2018, May 2023
