= 2015 NWSL expansion draft =

Soccer draft

General information
- Sport: Soccer
- Date: November 2, 2015
- Time: 12 p.m. EST
- Location: Conference call

Overview
- 10 total selections
- League: National Women's Soccer League
- Teams: 1
- Expansion team: Orlando Pride
- Expansion season: 2016

The 2015 NWSL expansion draft was a special draft held on November 2, 2015, by the National Women's Soccer League to allow expansion side Orlando Pride to select players from existing teams in the league. The Pride were allowed to select up to ten players total from the existing nine NWSL teams from a list of unprotected players previously provided by the clubs.

== Format ==
- 2015 playoff teams (Chicago Red Stars, FC Kansas City, Seattle Reign FC and Washington Spirit) were allowed to protect up to 9 players, and 2015 non-playoff teams (Boston Breakers, Houston Dash, Portland Thorns FC, Sky Blue FC and Western New York Flash) up to 10.
- Clubs with more than two U.S. allocated players could protect up to two of them; the remaining allocated players would be left unprotected.
- The Pride were allowed to pick up to two players from any existing team, or just one if they selected a US allocated player.
- The Pride were allowed to pick no more than two US allocated players total.
- When an existing club loses a player, they may protect one of their remaining unprotected players.
- Eligible players included those left unprotected by their club encompassing:
  - Any current NWSL players including U.S., Mexican and Canadian allocated players
  - Any unsigned player who was previously claimed via waivers
  - Any player that has been loaned to a club outside the NWSL
  - Any player whose rights are held by a specific team
- Players on a team's Discovery List were not eligible to be selected by the Pride.

== Expansion draft results ==
The Orlando Pride selected the following playersduring the Expansion Draft on Monday, November 2, 2015.

#	Player	Previous team	Next protected
1	Meghan Klingenberg^{1}	Seattle Reign FC	Team protected
2	Ashlyn Harris	Washington Spirit	Team protected
3	Taryn Hemmings	Chicago Red Stars	Michele Dalton
4	Jasmyne Spencer	Western New York Flash	Elizabeth Eddy
5	Jamia Fields	Western New York Flash	Team protected
6	Cami Levin	Sky Blue FC	Maya Hayes
7	Lianne Sanderson	Portland Thorns FC	Mana Shim
8	Toni Pressley	Houston Dash	Tiffany McCarty
9	Maddy Evans	Boston Breakers	Stephanie Verdoia
10	Aubrey Bledsoe	Sky Blue FC	End of draft

^{1}On October 26, 2015, the expansion Orlando Pride announced that it had traded the first pick in the 2015 NWSL Expansion Draft, as well as the first-overall pick in the 2016 NWSL College Draft and an international roster spot for the 2016 and 2017 NWSL seasons, to the Portland Thorns FC in exchange for United States forward Alex Morgan and Canadian midfielder Kaylyn Kyle.

== Team-by-team breakdown ==
- **Bold** indicates a player was selected in the expansion draft
- Blue highlights indicate US allocated players
- ^Indicates a player that was protected after a teammate had been drafted

=== Boston Breakers ===
Protected	Unprotected
Sinead Farrelly	Andressa Alves da Silva
Kassey Kallman	Amy Barczuk
Julie King	**Maddy Evans**
Stephanie McCaffrey	Nkem Ezurike
Kristie Mewis	Jami Kranich
Alyssa Naeher	Lauren Lazo
Mollie Pathman	Francielle
Katie Schoepfer	Morgan Marlborough
Kyah Simon	Bianca Sierra
McCall Zerboni	Stephanie Verdoia^
	Rachel Wood

=== Chicago Red Stars ===
Protected	Unprotected
Danielle Colaprico	Brittany Bock
Vanessa DiBernardo	Hayley Brock
Arin Gilliland	Zakiya Bywaters
Jen Hoy	Lori Chalupny
Sofia Huerta	Michele Dalton^
Samantha Johnson	Abby Erceg
Julie Johnston	**Taryn Hemmings**
Alyssa Mautz	Adriana Leon
Christen Press	Michelle Lomnicki
	Mary Luba
	Kecia Morway
	Rachel Quon
	Melissa Tancredi
	Cara Walls

=== Houston Dash ===
Protected	Unprotected
Morgan Brian	Rachael Axon
Amber Brooks	Poliana Barbosa
Ellie Brush	Rosana dos Santos Augusto
Allysha Chapman	Jen LaPonte
Bianca Henninger	Camila Martins Pereira
Carli Lloyd	Tiffany McCarty^
Andressa Cavalari Machry	Erin McLeod
Jessica McDonald	**Toni Pressley**
Stephanie Ochs	Lauren Sesselmann
Kealia Ohai	

=== FC Kansas City ===
Protected	Unprotected
Yael Averbuch	Liz Bogus
Nicole Barnhart	Leigh Ann Brown
Shea Groom	Jen Buczkowski
Mandy Laddish	Kaysie Clark
Rebecca Moros	Katrina Gorry
Amy Rodriguez	Caroline Kastor
Katelyn Rowland	Sara Keane
Becky Sauerbrunn	Amy LePeilbet
Erika Tymrak	Meghan Lisenby
	Heather O'Reilly
	Nikki Phillips
	Jenna Richmond
	Frances Silva

=== Portland Thorns FC ===
Protected	Unprotected
Michelle Betos	Alyssa Kleiner
Dagny Brynjarsdottir	Clare Polkinghorne
Stephanie Catley	**Lianne Sanderson**
Tobin Heath	Meleana Shim^
Kendall Johnson	Rhian Wilkinson
Allie Long	
Emily Menges	
Christine Sinclair	
Jodie Taylor	
Kat Williamson	

=== Seattle Reign FC ===
Protected	Unprotected
Lauren Barnes	Michelle Cruz
Rachel Corsie	Kiersten Dallstream
Jess Fishlock	Danielle Foxhoven
Kendall Fletcher	**Meghan Klingenberg**
Kim Little	Haley Kopmeyer
Megan Rapinoe	Merritt Mathias
Hope Solo	Elli Reed
Keelin Winters	Havana Solaun
Beverly Yanez	Caroline Stanley
	Katrine Veje
	Abby Wambach

=== Sky Blue FC ===
Protected	Unprotected
Brittany Cameron	**Aubrey Bledsoe**
Caitlin Foord	Kim DeCesare
Katy Freels	Jonelle Filigno
Kristin Grubka	Courtney Goodson
Samantha Kerr	Shawna Gordon
Sarah Killion	Hayley Haagsma
Lindsi Lisonbee Cutshall	Maya Hayes^
Nadia Nadim	**Cami Levin**
Kelley O'Hara	Taylor Lytle
Christie Rampone	Mónica Ocampo
	Nikki Stanton

=== Washington Spirit ===
Protected	Unprotected
Estefania Banini	Josephine Chukwunonye
Crystal Dunn	Whitney Church
Victoria Huster	Amanda DaCosta
Estelle Johnson	Laura del Rio
Diana Matheson	Caprice Dydasco
Christine Nairn	Natasha Harding
Francisca Ordega	**Ashlyn Harris**
Megan Oyster	Ali Krieger
Katherine Reynolds	Joanna Lohman
	Ngozi Okobi
	Verónica Pérez
	Hayley Raso
	Arianna Romero
	Angela Salem
	Tiffany Weimer
	Kelsey Wys

=== Western New York Flash ===
Protected	Unprotected
Lady Andrade	Tatiana Coleman
Halimatu Ayinde	Sabrina D'Angelo
Abby Dahlkemper	Elizabeth Eddy^
Becky Edwards	Kristen Edmonds
Whitney Engen	**Jamia Fields**
Jaelene Hinkle	Amanda Frisbie
Sydney Leroux	Kristen Hamilton
Samantha Mewis	Michelle Heyman
Brittany Taylor	Chantel Jones
Lynn Williams	Ashley Nick
	Haley Palmer
	**Jasmyne Spencer**
	India Trotter

== See also ==
- List of NWSL drafts
- 2016 National Women's Soccer League season
