= 2015 Boston Breakers season =

Boston Breakers
2015 season
- Owner: Boston Women's Soccer, LLC
- Head coach: Tom Durkin
- Stadium: Harvard Stadium; Boston, MA
- Top goalscorer: League: Kristie Mewis (6); All: Kristie Mewis (9)
- Highest home attendance: 4,325 (August 1 vs. Seattle)
- Lowest home attendance: 1,861 (May 22 vs. Sky Blue)
- Average home league attendance: 2,863
Home colors	Away colors

The 2015 Boston Breakers season, is the club's tenth overall year of existence, sixth consecutive year, and third year as a member of the National Women's Soccer League. They played 20 games, finishing with 4 wins, 3 draws, and 13 losses. They did not qualify for the post-season playoffs, and finished the season at ninth place in a nine team league.

== Club ==
=== Coaching staff ===
Position	Staff
Head Coach	Tom Durkin
Assistant Coach	Dushawne Simpson
Goalkeeper Coach	Ashley Phillips

Last updated: April 19, 2015
Source: http://www.bostonbreakerssoccer.com/ABOUT/COACHING/index_E.html

=== First-team squad ===
Note: Flags indicate national team as defined under FIFA eligibility rules; some limited exceptions apply. Players may hold more than one non-FIFA nationality.

No.	Pos.	Nation	Player
1	GK	USA	Alyssa Naeher
2	GK	USA	Jami Kranich
4	DF	USA	Cat Whitehill
5	DF	USA	Kassey Kallman
7	FW	BRA	Ketlen Wiggers
8	DF	USA	Julie King
9	FW	USA	Stephanie McCaffrey
10	MF	BRA	Rafinha
11	MF	USA	Amy Barczuk
15	FW	USA	Morgan Marlborough

No.	Pos.	Nation	Player
17	MF	BRA	Suzane Pires
18	DF	USA	Maddy Evans
19	MF	USA	Kristie Mewis
20	DF	USA	Mollie Pathman
21	MF	BRA	Bia
22	FW	CAN	Nkem Ezurike
23	DF	MEX	Bianca Sierra
24	DF	USA	Rachel Wood
26	MF	USA	Stephanie Verdoia
88	MF	USA	Katie Schoepfer

== Competitions ==
=== Key ===
Win Tie Loss

=== Preseason ===
March 20, Fri 1	Boston College Eagles	0–4	Boston Breakers	Chestnut Hill, Massachusetts
(EDT) UTC-4		Report	Evans 36', 57'; Pires 69'; Brinson 89'	Stadium: Newton Soccer Complex; Attendance: Closed-door
Note: Three 35-minute periods

March 24, Tue 2	Boston Breakers (United States)	5–0	Jamaica national team	St. Augustine, Florida
19:00 (EDT) UTC-4	McCaffrey 9'; Mewis 12'; Whitehill 27'; Marlborough 54'; Brinson 69'	Report		Stadium: Saints Field; Attendance: 1,100

March 28, Sat 3	Boston Breakers (United States)	5–0	Jamaica national team	Winter Springs, Florida
19:30 (EDT) UTC-4	Pires 35'; Mewis 37'; Whitehill 50'; Ezurike 61'; Barczuk 80'	Report		Stadium: Central Winds Park; Attendance: 500

April 4, Sat 4	Boston Breakers	3–1	Connecticut Huskies	Marlborough, Massachusetts
19:00 (EDT) UTC-4	McCaffrey 17'; Mewis 29'; Wood 71'	Report	Altrui 27'	Stadium: ForeKicks Sports Complex

=== Regular season ===
April 11, Sat 1	Portland Thorns FC	4–1	Boston Breakers	Portland, Oregon
22:00 (EDT) UTC-4	Farrelly 21'; Shim 38'; Long 71', 72'	Report	Pathman (yellow card) 33'; McCaffrey 63'	Stadium: Providence Park; Attendance: 13,386; Referee: Margaret Domka

April 26, Sun 2	Boston Breakers	3–2	Houston Dash	Boston
17:00 EDT UTC-4	King 8'; Ezurike 31' (McCaffrey); Evans (yellow card) 55'; Lloyd 72' (o.g.)	Report	Cross (yellow card) 44'; McDonald 58' (Brian), 65' (Ohai); Roche (yellow card) 90'	Stadium: Soldiers Field Soccer Stadium; Attendance: 2,376; Referee: Danielle Chesky

May 2, Sat 3	Western New York Flash	3–1	Boston Breakers	Rochester, New York
19:00 EDT UTC-4	Mewis 23' (Edwards); Edwards 62' (Williams); Edmonds (yellow card) 74'; Leroux 88' (Dahlkemper)	Report	Marlborough 15' (McCaffrey)	Stadium: Sahlen's Stadium

May 9, Sat 4	Chicago Red Stars	3–0	Boston Breakers	Bridgeview, Illinois
17:00 EDT UTC-4	Johnson (yellow card) 22'; Huerta 56' (DiBernardo), 82' (Gilliland); Walls 70' (Huerta)	Report	King (yellow card) 39'	Stadium: Toyota Park; Attendance: 16,017; Referee: Margaret Domka

May 16, Sat 5	Boston Breakers	1–0	Portland Thorns FC	Boston
16:00 EDT UTC-4	Mewis 93+'	Report	Williamson (yellow card) 40'; Betos (yellow card) 92'	Stadium: Soldiers Field Soccer Stadium; Attendance: 2,669; Referee: Christopher Spivey

May 22, Fri 6	Boston Breakers	1–1	Sky Blue FC	Boston
19:00 EDT UTC-4	McCaffrey 60' (unassisted)	Report	Freels 8' (Nadim)	Stadium: Soldiers Field Soccer Stadium; Attendance: 1,861

May 30, Sat 7	Boston Breakers	1–0	FC Kansas City	Boston
19:00 EDT UTC-4	K Mewis 51' (Schoepfer)	Report		Stadium: Soldiers Field Soccer Stadium; Attendance: 3,176; Referee: Cedric Adams

June 6, Sat 8	Washington Spirit	1–1	Boston Breakers	Germantown, Maryland
19:00 EDT UTC-4	DaCosta 64' (unassisted); Nairn (yellow card) 58'	Report	Evans 65' (unassisted); Kallman (yellow card) 91+'	Stadium: Maureen Hendricks Field Maryland SoccerPlex; Attendance: 3,081

June 21, Sun 9	Boston Breakers	2–3	Seattle Reign FC	Boston
16:00 EDT UTC-4	Mewis 14'; King (yellow card) 38'; Pires (yellow card) 44'; Marlborough 76'	BOS Report; NWSL Report	Little 42'; Yanez 66'; Foxhoven (yellow card) 85'; Fishlock 86'	Stadium: Soldiers Field Soccer Stadium; Attendance: 2,145; Referee: Matthew Kreitzer

June 28, Sun 10	Boston Breakers	0–2	Western New York Flash	Boston
17:00 EDT UTC-4	Pathman (yellow card) 29'; Evans (yellow card) 31'	BOS Report; NWSL Report	Williams 19'; Eddy 42'	Stadium: Soldiers Field Soccer Stadium; Attendance: 2,011; Referee: Farhad Dadhko

July 9, Thu 11	Boston Breakers	2–3	FC Kansas City	Boston
18:00 EDT UTC-4	Marlborough 3'; Mewis 60'	BOS report NWSL report Box	Tymrak 1', 45'; Groom 79'; Silva (yellow card) 90+3'	Stadium: Soldiers Field Soccer Stadium; Attendance: 2,525; Referee: Margaret Domka

July 18, Sat 12	Chicago Red Stars	1–1	Boston Breakers	Lisle, Illinois
20:00 EDT UTC-4	Chalupny 54' (Hemmings); Leon (yellow card) 75'	BOS report NWSL report Box	McCaffrey 62' (unassisted); Schoepfer (yellow card) 63'	Stadium: Village of Lisle-Benedictine University Sports Complex; Attendance: 3,560; Referee: Farhad Dadhko

July 22, Wed 13	Boston Breakers	1–2	Chicago Red Stars	Boston
19:00 EDT UTC-4	Simon 69' (McCaffrey)	BOS report NWSL report Box	Tancredi 41' (Mautz); Press 90' (Hoy)	Stadium: Soldiers Field Soccer Stadium; Attendance: 3,403; Referee: Cedric Adams

July 25, Sat 14	Sky Blue FC	3–1	Boston Breakers	Piscataway, New Jersey
19:00 EDT UTC-4	O'Hara 13' (Freels), 36' (Kerr); Kerr 52' (Haagsma)	BOS report NWSL report	Lauren Lazo 84' (Rafinha)	Stadium: Yurcak Field; Attendance: 2,067; Referee: Tori Penso

August 1, Sat 15	Boston Breakers	1–2	Seattle Reign FC	Boston
16:00 EDT UTC-4	Mewis 34'; King (yellow card) 59' (yellow-red card) 82'	BOS report NWSL report	Yanez 24'; Little 59' (pen.), (yellow card) 65'	Stadium: Soldiers Field Soccer Stadium; Attendance: 4,325; Referee: Ekaterina Koroleva

August 5, Wed 16	Portland Thorns FC	5–2	Boston Breakers	Portland, Oregon
22:00 EDT UTC-4	Taylor 16' (Heath); Zerboni 49' (Long), 53' (unassisted); Shim 54' (Sinclair); Long 66' (unassisted)	BOS report NWSL report	Pires (yellow card) 30'; Williamson 36' (o.g.); Mewis 87' (pen.)	Stadium: Providence Park; Attendance: 15,624; Referee: Matthew Kreitzer

August 8, Sat 17	Boston Breakers	2–1	Washington Spirit	Boston
19:00 EDT UTC-4	King 12' (Mewis); Simon (yellow card) 30', (goal) 38' (unassisted); Ezurike (yellow card) 79'; McCaffrey (yellow card) 90'	BOS report NWSL report	Oyster (yellow card) 33'; Matheson 49' (unassisted); Salem (yellow card) 85'	Stadium: Soldiers Field Soccer Stadium; Attendance: 4,137; Referee: Danielle Chesky

August 22, Sat 18	FC Kansas City	3–0	Boston Breakers	Kansas City, Missouri
20:00 EDT UTC-4	Rodriguez 29' (Robinson), 52' (Holiday); Holiday 50' (Rodriguez)	BOS report NWSL report	Marlborough (yellow card) 81'	Stadium: Swope Soccer Village; Attendance: 2,321; Referee: Brandon Artis

August 26, Wed 19	Seattle Reign FC	3–1	Boston Breakers	Seattle
22:00 EDT UTC-4	Rapinoe 21' (Cox); Fletcher 34'; Little 56' (Rapinoe)	BOS report NWSL report	Evans 88' (Mewis)	Stadium: Memorial Stadium; Attendance: 4,484; Referee: David Mon

August 30, Sun 20	Houston Dash	1–0	Boston Breakers	Houston
20:30 EDT UTC-4	Masar 34' (McDonald); Masar (yellow card) 35'	NWSL Report	Schoepfer (yellow card) 89'	Stadium: BBVA Compass Stadium; Attendance: 6,842; Referee: Cedric Adams

== Standings ==
Pos	Team	Pld	W	D	L	GF	GA	GD	Pts	Qualification
1	Seattle Reign FC	20	13	4	3	41	21	+20	43	NWSL Shield
2	Chicago Red Stars	20	8	9	3	31	22	+9	33	NWSL Playoffs
3	FC Kansas City (C)	20	9	5	6	32	20	+12	32	NWSL Playoffs
4	Washington Spirit	20	8	6	6	31	28	+3	30	NWSL Playoffs
5	Houston Dash	20	6	6	8	21	26	−5	24	
6	Portland Thorns FC	20	6	5	9	27	29	−2	23	
7	Western New York Flash	20	6	5	9	24	34	−10	23	
8	Sky Blue FC	20	5	7	8	22	28	−6	22	
9	Boston Breakers	20	4	3	13	22	43	−21	15	

Source: NWSL
Rules for classification: Tiebreakers
(C) Champions

Results summary

Overall								Home						Away					
Pld	Pts	W	L	T	GF	GA	GD	W	L	T	GF	GA	GD	W	L	T	GF	GA	GD
20	15	4	13	3	22	43	−21	4	5	1	14	16	−2	0	8	2	8	27	−19

Last updated: September 5, 2015
Source: NWSLsoccer.com standings
Pld = Matches played; Pts = Points; W = Matches won; T = Matches tied; L = Matches lost; GF = Goals for; GA = Goals against; GD = Goal difference

Results by round

Round	1	2	3	4	5	6	7	8	9	10	11	12	13	14	15	16	17	18	19	20
Ground	A	H	A	A	H	H	H	A	H	H	H	A	H	A	H	A	H	A	A	A
Result	L	W	L	L	W	D	W	D	L	L	L	D	L	L	L	L	W	L	L	L

Updated to match(es) played on September 5, 2015. Source: Match reports
A = Away; H = Home; W = Win; D = Draw; L = Loss

== Squad statistics ==
Source: NWSL

Key to positions: FW - Forward, MF - Midfielder, DF - Defender, GK - Goalkeeper

N	Pos	Player	GP	GS	Min	G	A	WG	Shot	SOG	Cro	CK	Off	Foul	FS	YC	RC
11	MF	Amy Barczuk	20	18	1612	0	0	0	2	0	0	1	0	18	6	0	0
21	MF	Beatriz Vaz e Silva	10	3	369	0	0	0	3	1	0	0	0	4	1	0	0
18	DF	Maddy Evans	18	13	1150	2	0	0	9	3	7	0	2	15	11	2	0
22	FW	Nkem Ezurike	12	3	417	1	1	0	11	3	0	0	6	15	8	1	0
49	MF	Riley Houle	1	0	19	0	0	0	1	0	0	0	0	3	0	0	0
58	MF	Chanel Johnson	1	0	14	0	0	0	0	0	0	0	1	0	0	0	0
5	DF	Kassey Kallman	20	20	1800	0	0	0	4	2	1	0	0	13	15	1	0
7	FW	Ketlen Wiggers	1	1	61	0	0	0	0	0	0	0	0	0	0	0	0
8	DF	Julie King	18	18	1580	2	0	0	13	7	2	0	0	18	6	3	1
3	DF	Lauren Lazo	14	11	1025	1	0	0	8	5	9	0	2	13	3	0	0
15	FW	Morgan Marlborough	16	8	677	3	0	0	10	7	3	0	0	6	1	1	0
9	FW	Stephanie McCaffrey	19	17	1418	3	3	0	32	16	14	0	17	5	13	1	0
19	MF	Kristie Mewis	20	20	1785	6	2	2	81	32	16	55	5	15	23	0	0
20	DF	Mollie Pathman	20	20	1800	0	0	0	2	1	23	0	0	8	11	2	0
17	MF	Suzane Pires	12	6	447	0	1	0	3	1	3	0	0	7	2	2	0
10	MF	Rafaela de Miranda Travalão	13	8	790	0	1	0	14	7	5	23	1	13	9	0	0
88	MF	Katie Schoepfer	19	17	1421	0	2	0	12	6	0	0	1	16	6	2	0
17	FW	Kyah Simon	7	7	630	2	0	1	11	5	0	0	3	9	5	1	0
26	MF	Stephanie Verdoia	8	1	186	0	0	0	3	1	0	0	0	2	2	0	0
4	DF	Cat Whitehill	1	1	90	0	0	0	0	0	0	0	0	0	0	0	0
24	DF	Rachel Wood	10	8	701	0	0	0	4	1	1	0	1	10	6	0	0

N	Pos	Goal keeper	GP	GS	Min	W	L	T	Shot	SOG	Sav	GA	GA/G	Pen	PKF	SO
2	GK	Jami Kranich	8	8	720	2	4	2	92	42	29	13	1.625	0	0	2
1	GK	Alyssa Naeher	12	12	1080	2	9	1	209	95	65	30	2.5	1	1	0

== See also ==
- 2015 National Women's Soccer League season
- 2015 in American soccer
