= 2016 Boston Breakers season =

Boston Breakers
2016 season
- Owner: Boston Women's Soccer, LLC
- Head coach: Matt Beard
- Stadium: Jordan Field; Boston, Massachusetts
- Highest home attendance: 4,007 (June 10 vs. Washington)
- Lowest home attendance: 3,288 (May 22 vs. Kansas City)
- Average home league attendance: 3570
Home colors	Away colors

The 2016 Boston Breakers season, is the club's eleventh season overall, its seventh consecutive season, and fourth year as a member of the National Women's Soccer League.

== Club ==
=== Coaching staff ===
Position	Staff
Head Coach	Matt Beard
Assistant Coach	Dushawne Simpson
Assistant Coach	Cat Whitehill
Goalkeeper Coach	Ashley Phillips

Last updated: May 5, 2016

=== First-team squad ===
As of July 12, 2016

Note: Flags indicate national team as defined under FIFA eligibility rules; some limited exceptions apply. Players may hold more than one non-FIFA nationality.

No.	Pos.	Nation	Player
0	MF	FRA	Ghoutia Karchouni
1	GK	USA	Libby Stout
2	GK	USA	Jami Kranich
3	FW	USA	Elisa Krieghoff
4	DF	USA	Whitney Engen
5	DF	USA	Kassey Kallman
7	MF	USA	Sinead Farrelly
8	DF	USA	Julie King
9	FW	ENG	Natasha Dowie
10	MF	SWE	Louise Schillgard
11	FW	USA	Brittany Ratcliffe

No.	Pos.	Nation	Player
14	GK	USA	Abby Smith
17	FW	AUS	Kyah Simon
19	MF	USA	Kristie Mewis
20	DF	USA	Mollie Pathman
21	DF	USA	Christen Westphal
22	MF	USA	Stephanie Verdoia
23	DF	USA	Brooke Elby
24	DF	USA	Rachel Wood
26	MF	USA	Angela Salem
88	MF	USA	Katie Schoepfer
99	FW	GER	Eunice Beckmann

== Competitions ==
Key

Win Tie Loss

=== Preseason ===
As in previous seasons, Breakers spent time in Florida during preseason.

Sun Mar 20	Northeastern Huskies	0–7	Boston Breakers	Brookline, Massachusetts
6:00 p.m. EST		Report	Mewis 12'; Schoepfer 30'; Marlborough 38'; King 42'; Ratcliffe 52'; Wood 67'; Krieghoff 78'	Stadium: Parsons Field
Note: Played in three 30-minute periods

Fri Mar 25	Florida State Seminoles	1–0	Boston Breakers	Tallahassee, Florida
7:00 p.m. EST	Connolly 80'	Report		Stadium: Seminole Soccer Complex
Note: Played in three 30-minute periods

Sun Apr 3	Boston Breakers	Cancelled	Connecticut Huskies	Massachusetts
		Summary
Note: Cancelled due to inclement weather.

Sun Apr 3	Boston Breakers	Cancelled	Boston College Eagles	Massachusetts
		Summary
Note: Cancelled due to inclement weather.

=== Regular season ===
Sat Apr 16 1	Washington Spirit	1–0	Boston Breakers	Boyds, Maryland
7:00 p.m.	Lohman 3'; Megan Oyster (yellow card) 86'	Report		Stadium: Maryland SoccerPlex; Attendance: 3,578; Referee: Margaret Domka

Sun Apr 24 2	Boston Breakers	0–3	Seattle Reign FC	Boston, Massachusetts
	Brittany Ratcliffe (yellow card) 60'; McCall Zerboni (yellow card) 81'	Report	Manon Melis 10' (Kim Little); Rachel Corsie 39' (Kim Little); Hope Solo (yellow card) 50'; Kim Little 79' (Beverly Yanez)	Stadium: Jordan Field; Attendance: 3,743; Referee: Matthew Franz

Sun May 1 3	Boston Breakers	0–1	Portland Thorns FC	Boston, Massachusetts
	Schillgard (yellow card) 38'; King (yellow card) 78'; Ratcliffe (yellow card) 90'	Report	Dagný Brynjarsdóttir 79' (Heath)	Stadium: Jordan Field; Attendance: 3,698; Referee: Brandon Artis

Sat May 7 4	Boston Breakers	0–1	Chicago Red Stars	Boston, Massachusetts
		Report; Report	Jen Hoy (yellow card) 7'; Christen Press 60' (unassisted)	Stadium: Jordan Field; Attendance: 3,622; Referee: Margaret Domka

Fri May 13 5	Sky Blue FC	1–0	Boston Breakers	Piscataway, New Jersey
	Kassey Kallman 41' (own goal); Tasha Kai (yellow card) 60'; Nikki Stanton (yellow card) 75'	Report		Stadium: Yurcak Field; Attendance: 1,275; Referee: Guido Gonzales, Jr.

Sun May 22 6	Boston Breakers	1–0	FC Kansas City	Boston, Massachusetts
	Whitney Engen 19' (Kristie Mewis); Whitney Engen (yellow card) 91+'	Report		Stadium: Jordan Field; Attendance: 3,288; Referee: Chris Spivey

Fri May 27 7	Western New York Flash	4–0	Boston Breakers	Rochester, New York
	Taylor Smith 15'; Lynn Williams 64' (Michaela Hahn); Lynn Williams 65' (Meredith Speck); Abby Dahlkemper 78' (pen.)	Report	Eunice Beckmann (yellow card) 90'	Stadium: Sahlen's Stadium; Attendance: 3,940; Referee: Andrew Musashe

Fri Jun 10 8	Boston Breakers	1–1	Washington Spirit	Boston, Massachusetts
	Louise Schillgard 15' (pen.)	Report	Katie Stengel 13'	Stadium: Jordan Field; Attendance: 4,007; Referee: Margaret Domka

Sat Jun 18 9	Chicago Red Stars	3–0	Boston Breakers	Bridgeview, Illinois
	Sofia Huerta 3' (Vanessa DiBernardo), 57' (Alyssa Mautz); Sofia Huerta (yellow card) 56'; Casey Short 62' (Vanessa DiBernardo)	Report; Report; Stats	Louise Schillgard (yellow card) 55'; Eunice Beckmann (yellow card) 61'; Kyah Simon (yellow card) 94+'	Stadium: Toyota Park; Attendance: 2,553; Referee: Danielle Brzezesinski-Chesky

Fri Jun 24 10	Western New York Flash	7–1	Boston Breakers	Rochester, New York
7:00 p.m. ET	Lynn Williams 19' (Makenzy Doniak), 39' (Jessica McDonald); Jessica McDonald 28' (Samantha Mewis), 43' (Liz Eddy), 49' (Lynn Williams); Alanna Kennedy (yellow card) 35'; Makenzy Doniak 45+2' (Samantha Mewis); McCall Zerboni (yellow card) 60'; Taylor Smith 63' (Jaelene Hinkle)	Report	Christen Westphal 38'	Stadium: Sahlen's Stadium; Attendance: 3,024; Referee: Guido Gonzales Jr.

Sat Jul 2 11	Seattle Reign FC	2–0	Boston Breakers	Seattle
	Nahomi Kawasumi 14' (Manon Melis), 62' (Keelin Winters)	Report	Julie King (yellow card) 40'; Brittany Ratcliffe (yellow card) 72'	Stadium: Memorial Stadium; Attendance: 4,327; Referee: Farhad Dadkho

Sun Jul 10 12	Orlando Pride	2–1	Boston Breakers	Orlando, Florida
	Jasmyne Spencer (yellow card) 21'; Kristen Edmonds 90', 93+' (Leah Fortune)	Report	Mollie Pathman 5'; Brooke Elby (yellow card) 34' (yellow-red card) 89'; Louise Schillgard (yellow card) 49'; Jami Kranich (yellow card) 93+'	Stadium: Camping World Stadium; Attendance: 5,842; Referee: 5,842

Sun Jul 17 13	Boston Breakers	2–3	Sky Blue FC	Boston, Massachusetts
	Angela Salem 3' (unassisted); Julie King 85' (Louise Schillgard)	Report	Sarah Killion 28' (penalty); Leah Galton 37' (Tasha Kai); Erica Skroski 74' (unassisted)	Stadium: Jordan Field; Attendance: 3,743; Referee: Matthew Franz

Sun Jul 31 14	Boston Breakers	1–0	Orlando Pride	Boston, Massachusetts
	Natasha Dowie 10' (unassisted); Louise Schillgard (yellow card) 29'	Report	Toni Pressley (yellow card) 90'	Stadium: Jordan Field; Attendance: 4,379; Referee: Leszek Stalmach

Sun Aug 28 15	FC Kansas City	0–2	Boston Breakers	Kansas City, Missouri
		Report	Katie Schoepfer 38' (Brooke Elby); Kristie Mewis 81' (unassisted)	Stadium: Swope Soccer Village; Attendance: 2,206; Referee: Christina Unkel

Wed Aug 31 16	Boston Breakers	1–3	Houston Dash	Boston, Massachusetts
	Natasha Dowie 91+'	Report	Kealia Ohai 3' (C Lloyd), 33' (unassisted); Carli Lloyd 62'	Stadium: Jordan Field; Attendance: 3,762; Referee: Jasmine Peralta

Sun Sep 4 17	Portland Thorns FC	5–1	Boston Breakers	Portland, Oregon
	Christine Sinclair 14' (N Nadim); Allie Long 48' (C Sinclair); Nadia Nadim 41' (pen.), 79' (A Long) (yellow card) 90'	Report	Julie King 84' (Eunice Beckmann)	Stadium: Providence Park; Attendance: 17,152; Referee: Jon Freemon

Thu Sep 8 18	Boston Breakers	2–2	Western New York Flash	Boston, Massachusetts
	Kyah Simon 4' (J King); Natasha Dowie (yellow card) 9'; (goal) 51' (Louise Schillgard); Julie King (yellow card) 61'; Eunice Beckmann (yellow card) 68'	Report	Jessica McDonald 38' (Samantha Mewis); Lynn Williams 76' (Makenzy Doniak)	Stadium: Jordan Field; Attendance: 1,435; Referee: Cuauhtemoc Delgadillo

Sun Sep 11 19	Houston Dash	4–1	Boston Breakers	Houston
	Janine Beckie 26' (Carli Lloyd); Kealia Ohai 35' (Janine Beckie); Andressa Machry (yellow card) 55'; Carli Lloyd 78' (Kealia Ohai); Carli Lloyd 81' (penalty)	Report	Elise Krieghoff 76' (unassisted)	Stadium: BBVA Compass Stadium; Attendance: 6,107; Referee: Levi Rippy

Sat Sep 24 20	Boston Breakers	0–4	Western New York Flash	Boston, Massachusetts
	Angela Salem (yellow card) 45'+3; Katie Schoepfer (yellow card) 70'; Whitney Engen (yellow card) 71'	Report	Jessica McDonald 2' (Makenzy Doniak); Lynn Williams 24' (unassisted); Samantha Mewis 45' (McCall Zerboni); Alanna Kennedy (yellow card) 61'; Abby Dahlkemper 68' (penalty)	Stadium: Jordan Field; Attendance: 4,027; Referee: Karen Abt

==== Standings ====
Pos	Team	Pld	W	D	L	GF	GA	GD	Pts	Qualification
1	Portland Thorns FC	20	12	5	3	35	19	+16	41	NWSL Shield
2	Washington Spirit	20	12	3	5	30	21	+9	39	NWSL Playoffs
3	Chicago Red Stars	20	9	6	5	24	20	+4	33	NWSL Playoffs
4	Western New York Flash (C)	20	9	5	6	40	26	+14	32	NWSL Playoffs
5	Seattle Reign FC	20	8	6	6	29	21	+8	30	
6	FC Kansas City	20	7	5	8	18	20	−2	26	
7	Sky Blue FC	20	7	5	8	24	30	−6	26	
8	Houston Dash	20	6	4	10	29	29	0	22	
9	Orlando Pride	20	6	1	13	20	30	−10	19	
10	Boston Breakers	20	3	2	15	14	47	−33	11	

Source: NWSL
Rules for classification: Tiebreakers
(C) Champions

Results summary

Overall								Home						Away					
Pld	Pts	W	L	T	GF	GA	GD	W	L	T	GF	GA	GD	W	L	T	GF	GA	GD
20	11	3	15	2	14	47	−33	3	5	2	9	15	−6	0	10	0	5	32	−27

Last updated: September 11, 2016
Source: NWSLsoccer.com standings
Pld = Matches played; Pts = Points; W = Matches won; T = Matches tied; L = Matches lost; GF = Goals for; GA = Goals against; GD = Goal difference

Results by round

Round	1	2	3	4	5	6	7	8	9	10	11	12	13	14	15	16	17	18	19	20
Stadium	A	H	H	H	A	H	A	H	A	A	A	A	H	H	A	H	A	H	A	H
Result	L	L	L	L	L	W	L	D	L	L	L	L	L	W	W	L	L	D	L	L

Updated to match(es) played on September 24, 2016. Source: May reports
A = Away; H = Home; W = Win; D = Draw; L = Loss

== Squad statistics ==
Source: NWSL

Key to positions: FW – Forward, MF – Midfielder, DF – Defender, GK – Goalkeeper

N	Pos	Player	GP	GS	Min	G	A	PK	Shot	SOG	SOG%	Cro	CK	Off	Foul	FS	YC	RC
99	FW	Eunice Beckmann	11	8	658	0	1	0	16	5	31%	5	0	3	18	8	3	0
9	FW	Natasha Dowie	7	7	605	3	0	0	21	10	48%	0	0	7	8	5	1	0
23	DF	Brooke Elby	13	11	919	0	0	0	3	2	67%	3	0	0	6	6	1	1
4	DF	Whitney Engen	14	14	1260	1	1	0	1	1	100%	2	0	0	0	9	2	0
5	DF	Kassey Kallman	20	20	1800	0	0	0	1	0	0%	0	0	0	10	15	0	0
29	MF	Ghoutia Karchouni	3	1	100	0	0	0	1	0	0%	0	1	0	0	4	0	0
8	DF	Julie King	18	17	1523	2	1	0	11	5	45%	6	0	1	16	6	5	0
2	GK	Jami Kranich	9	9	810	0	0	0	0	0	—	0	0	0	1	3	1	0
3	FW	Elisa Krieghoff	6	0	143	1	0	0	3	2	67%	0	0	1	1	1	0	0
15	FW	Morgan Marlborough	1	0	24	0	0	0	2	1	50%	1	1	1	1	1	0	0
9	FW	Stephanie McCaffrey	12	10	921	0	0	0	15	8	53%	4	0	7	7	5	0	0
19	MF	Kristie Mewis	14	13	1122	1	1	0	27	7	26%	4	26	2	14	20	0	0
20	DF	Mollie Pathman	13	12	1055	1	0	0	3	2	67%	9	1	0	1	9	0	0
11	FW	Brittany Ratcliffe	15	5	545	0	0	0	7	2	29%	4	0	1	4	4	3	0
26	MF	Angela Salem	19	19	1699	1	0	0	14	6	43%	4	5	0	17	19	1	0
10	MF	Louise Schillgard	18	16	1429	1	2	1	9	6	67%	9	31	2	27	5	4	0
88	MF	Katie Schoepfer	12	8	597	1	0	0	14	5	36%	0	0	1	6	2	1	0
17	FW	Kyah Simon	17	14	1293	1	1	0	29	7	24%	8	0	9	19	12	1	0
14	GK	Abby Smith	2	2	122	0	0	0	0	0	—	0	0	0	0	0	0	0
1	GK	Libby Stout	10	9	868	0	0	0	0	0	—	0	0	0	0	7	0	0
30	DF	Kylie Strom	7	3	344	0	0	0	0	0	—	2	0	1	3	3	0	0
22	MF	Stephanie Verdoia	10	5	453	0	0	0	6	3	50%	0	0	1	1	8	0	0
21	DF	Christen Westphal	13	7	579	1	0	0	2	1	50%	3	0	0	2	1	0	0
24	DF	Rachel Wood	7	2	260	0	0	0	2	0	0%	0	0	1	4	4	0	0
77	MF	McCall Zerboni	8	8	670	0	0	0	4	1	25%	1	0	0	15	12	1	0
Team Total			20	—	19799	14	7	1	191	74	39%	65	65	38	181	169	24	1

N	Pos	Goal keeper	GP	GS	Min	GA	GA/G	PKA	PKF	Shot	SOG	Sav	Sav%	YC	RC
2	GK	Jami Kranich	9	9	810	25	2.78	3	3	130	64	39	61%	1	0
14	GK	Abby Smith	2	2	122	1	0.50	0	0	19	8	7	88%	0	0
1	GK	Libby Stout	10	9	868	21	2.10	2	2	139	62	42	68%	0	0
Team Total			20	—	1800	47	2.35	5	5	288	134	88	66%	1	0

== See also ==
- 2016 National Women's Soccer League season
- 2016 in American soccer
