= Rachel Wood =

Rachel Wood may refer to:

- Rachel Wood (archaeologist)
- Rachel Wood (geologist), British geologist
- Rachel Wood (soccer) (born 1990), American soccer player
- Evan Rachel Wood, American actress, model and musician
