= Natasha Dowie =

English footballer (born 1988)

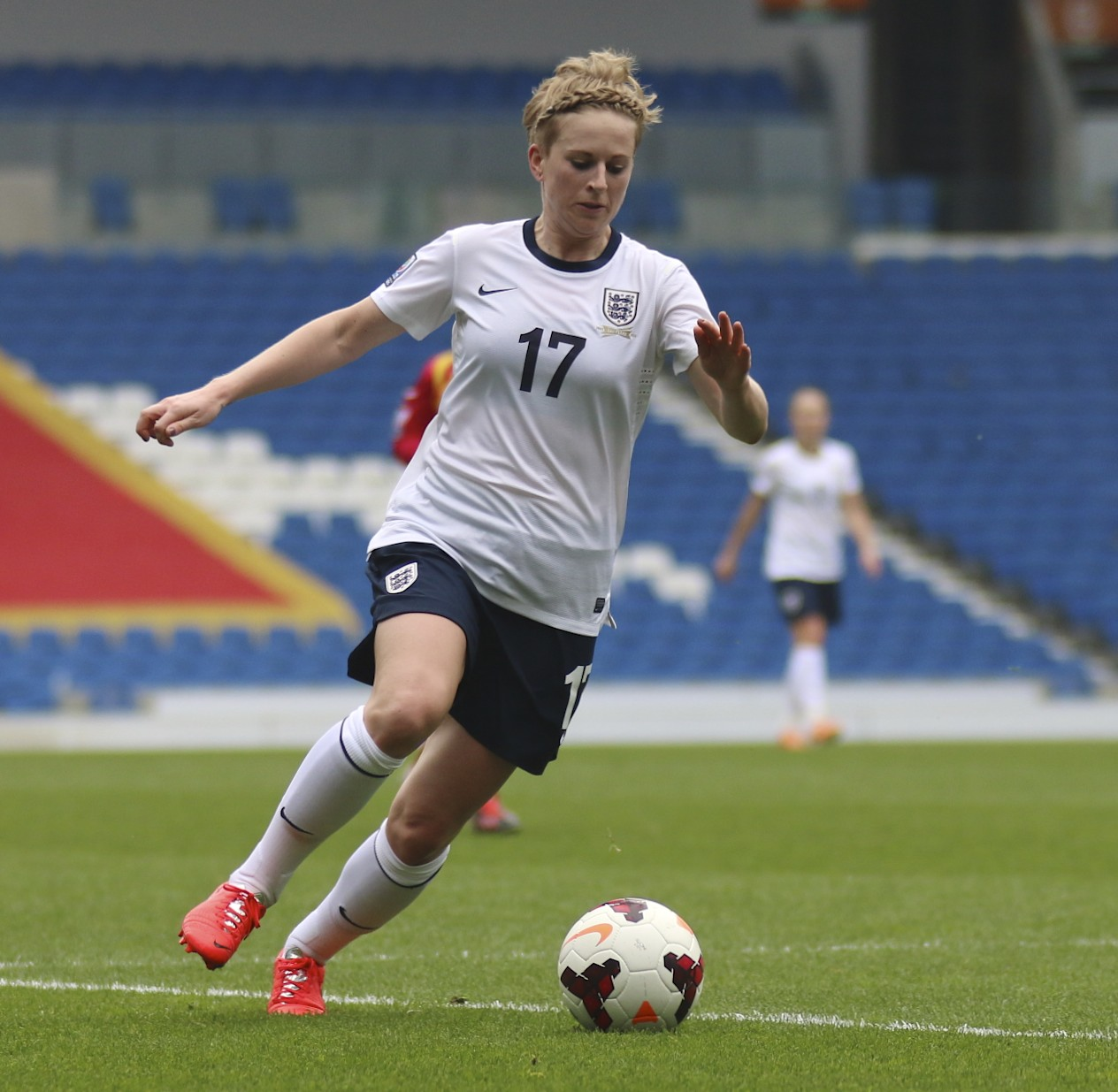
- Dowie playing for England in 2014

Personal information
- Full name: Natasha Khalila Dowie
- Date of birth: 30 June 1988 (age 38)
- Place of birth: Abu Dhabi, United Arab Emirates
- Height: 1.70 m (5 ft 7 in)
- Position: Striker

Youth career
- Watford

Senior career*
Years	Team	Apps	(Gls)
2004	Watford	?	(?)
2004–2006	Fulham	14	(1)
2006–2007	Charlton Athletic	17	(12)
2007–2012	Everton	25	(10)
2010	→ Barnet (loan)	?	(?)
2012–2015	Liverpool	67	(46)
2015	→ Melbourne Victory (loan)	7	(3)
2016	Doncaster Rovers Belles	3	(1)
2016–2017	Boston Breakers	30	(10)
2016–2017	→ Melbourne Victory (loan)	12	(9)
2017–2018	→ Melbourne Victory (loan)	12	(6)
2018	Linköping	11	(10)
2018–2020	Melbourne Victory	24	(16)
2019	→ Vålerenga (loan)	18	(11)
2020–2021	Milan	21	(12)
2021–2023	Reading	27	(7)
2023	→ Liverpool (loan)	7	(2)

International career^{‡}
2008	England U-19	4	(1)
2010–2011	England U-23	5	(2)
2009–2014	England	14	(5)
- * Club domestic league appearances and goals as of 17:40, 27 May 2023 (UTC) ‡ National team caps and goals as of 18:55, 1 March 2018 (UTC)

Natasha Khalila Dowie (born 30 June 1988) is an English former footballer. She represented the England women's national football team at the youth level before making her senior international debut in 2009. Dowie played for the London teams Watford, Fulham and Charlton Athletic, and then spent five years with Everton before transferring to FA WSL clubs Liverpool Ladies in November 2012 and Doncaster Rovers Belles in 2016. She also spent three periods on loan with Melbourne Victory of the Australian W-League in 2015, 2016, and 2017 and played for Boston Breakers in the National Women's Soccer League (NWSL) in 2016 and 2017.

Dowie announced her retirement from football on 21 September 2023, and is now in the role of women's ambassador for Liverpool FC.

== Club career ==
Dowie attended Roundwood Park School and began her career with Watford Ladies. After starting the 2004–05 season with five goals in five matches for Watford, she was signed by Fulham Ladies. Dowie joined Charlton Athletic Ladies in the 2006 close season and played in the FA Women's Cup final that year, with Charlton losing 4–1 to Arsenal. Charlton Athletic scrapped their women's team at end of the 2006–07 season and Dowie left the club.

=== Everton ===
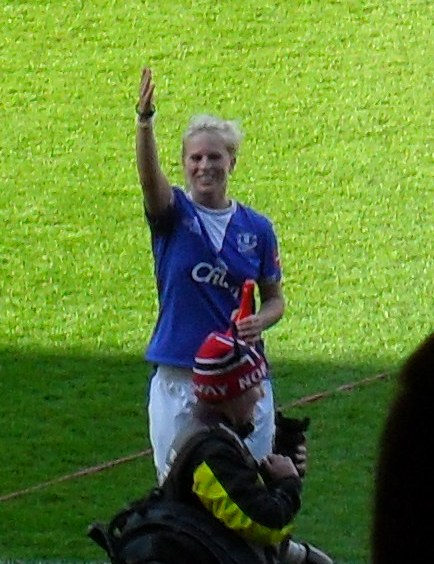
Natasha Dowie playing for Everton

Dowie joined Everton Ladies in preference to several other interested clubs including Arsenal. She stated her intention to "knock Arsenal off their pedestal in women's football".

After commuting from London to Liverpool, Dowie was a member of Everton's League Cup winning side in her first season with the club. On 3 May 2010, she scored two goals, including the 119th minute extra-time winner, to give Everton a 3–2 victory over Arsenal in the 2010 FA Women's Cup Final.

With Everton dormant ahead of the 2011 FA WSL season, Dowie played for Barnet in the 2010–11 FA Women's Premier League National Division. She continued to play for Everton in European competition and netted in The Blues' UEFA Women's Champions League quarter–final defeat to FCR 2001 Duisburg. Dowie then scored two goals for Everton in their first FA WSL match, including a stoppage-time equaliser, to rescue a 3–3 draw at local rivals Liverpool.

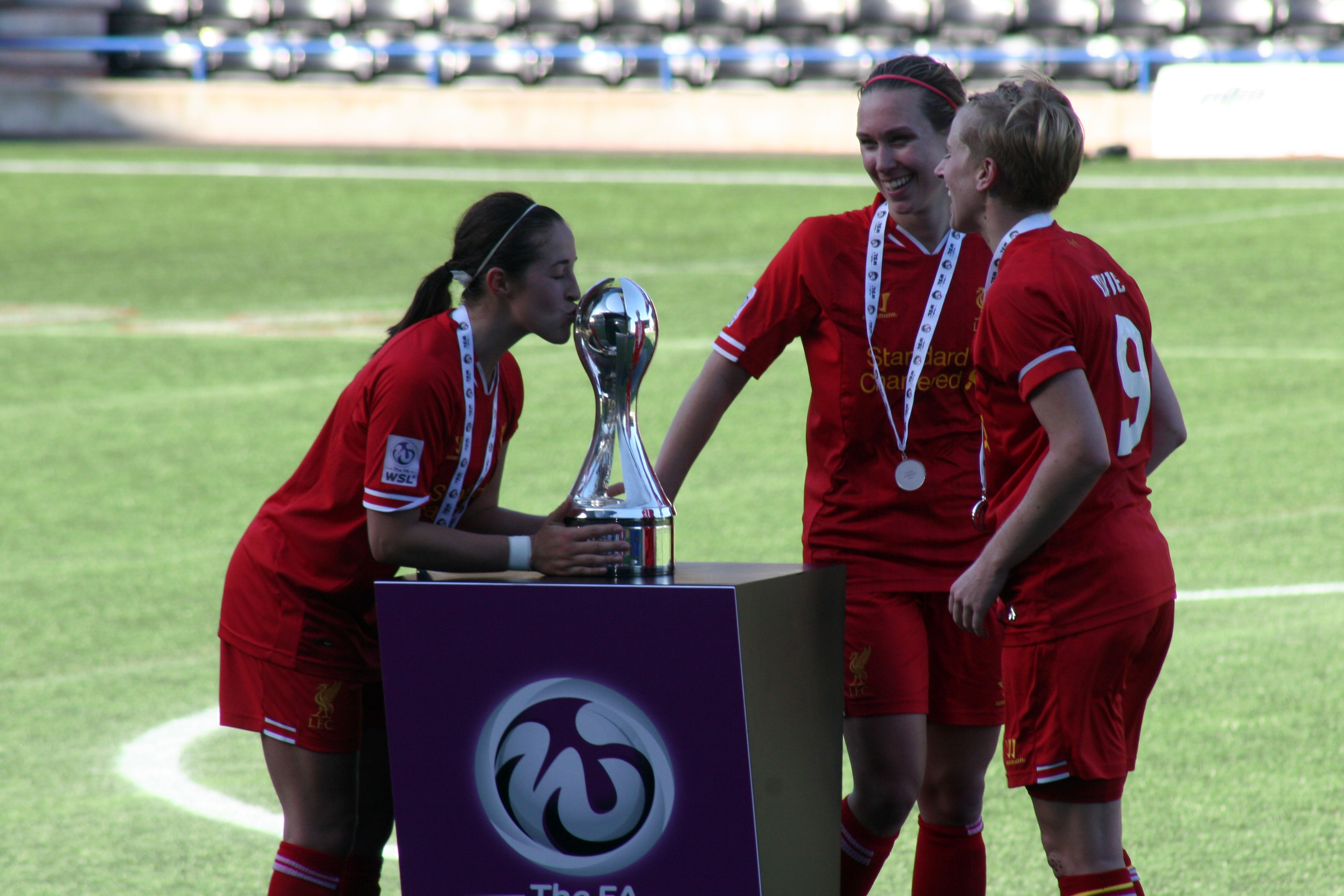
Dowie (right) with the 2013 FA WSL trophy

=== Liverpool ===
In November 2012 Dowie and Fara Williams left Everton for ambitious local rivals Liverpool, who were building a squad to challenge Arsenal's dominance of English women's football.

Dowie finished the top scorer in the 2013 FA WSL with 13 goals in 14 games for champions Liverpool. She was voted the FA Players' Player of the Year and selected in the Professional Footballers' Association (PFA) Team of the Year.

Liverpool retained their title in 2014, but were much less successful in 2015. They finished seventh of eight teams amidst an injury crisis and coach Matt Beard departed for American National Women's Soccer League (NWSL) club Boston Breakers. Dowie agreed a two-month loan to Australian W-League club Melbourne Victory in November 2015.

=== Doncaster Rovers ===
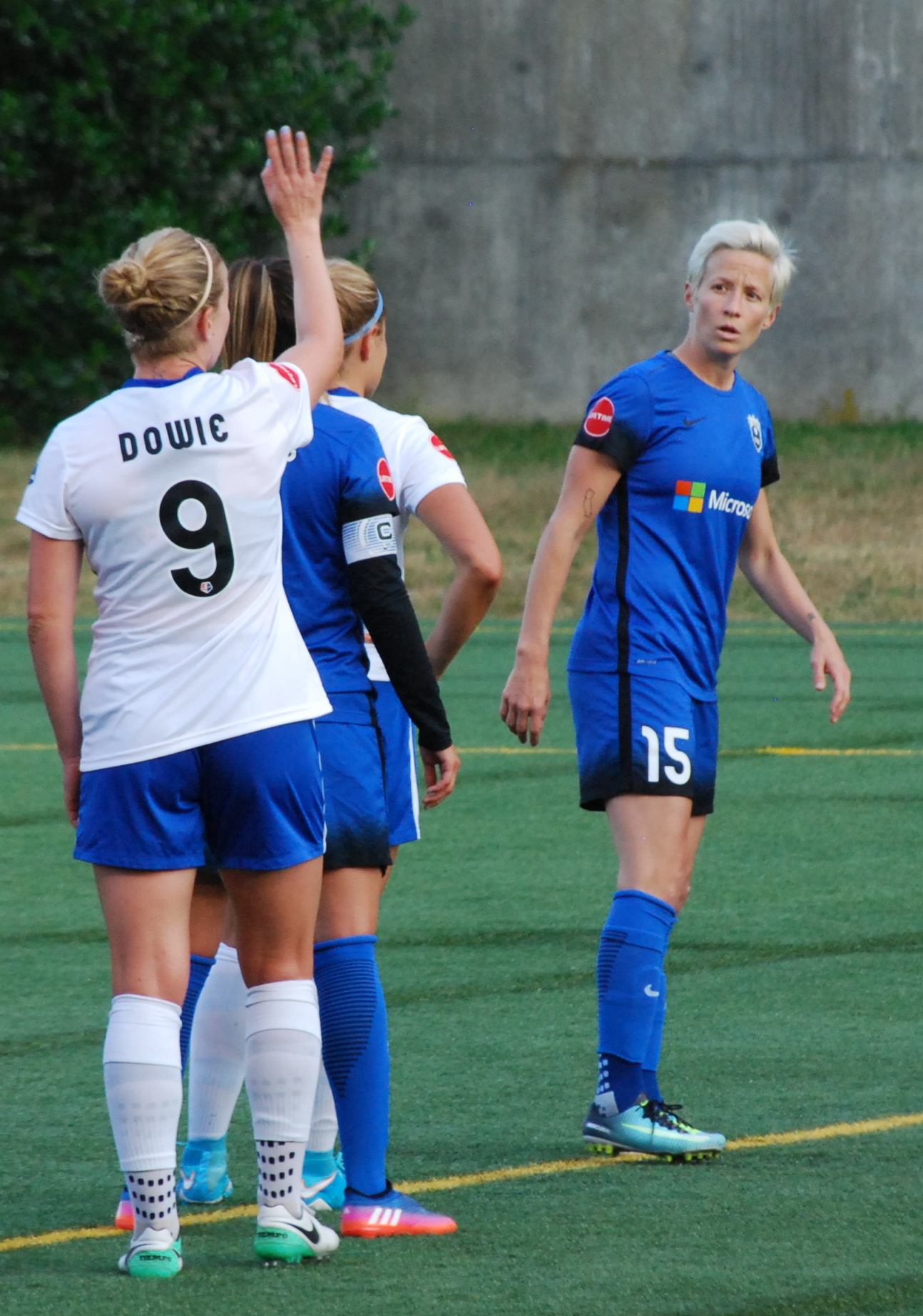
Dowie playing for Boston Breakers in 2017

Upon her return she transferred to newly promoted Doncaster Rovers Belles. Doncaster lost their four opening games and were marooned at the foot of the WSL 1 table, when Dowie left the club by "mutual consent" in the mid-season break.

=== Boston Breakers ===
On 17 July 2016, Boston Breakers announced her signing. Dowie finished the 2017 season as the top goal-scorer for the Breakers with 7 goals. She also wore the captain's arm band for the Breakers in matches on 23 and 30 September 2017 when Julie King was out with an injury. When Boston Breakers folded in January 2018, Dowie was not selected in the 2018 NWSL Dispersal Draft which was hastily arranged to assign displaced Breakers players to other NWSL clubs.

=== Linköpings ===
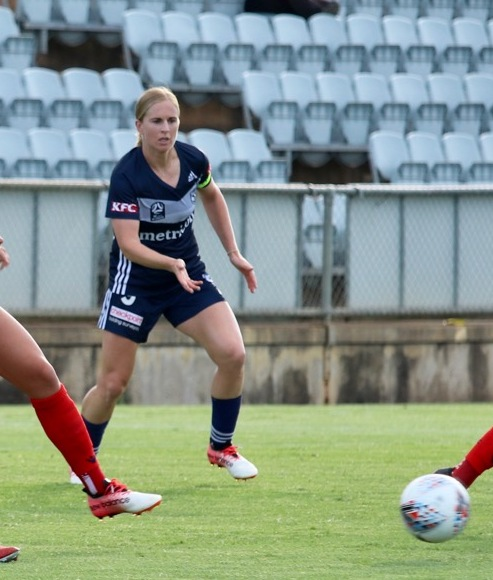
Natasha Dowie playing for Melbourne Victory

In January 2018, Dowie agreed to join Swedish Damallsvenskan champions Linköpings FC, on an initial six-month contract. On 26 June, it was confirmed that Dowie would be leaving Linköpings after her six-month contract expired, as they were unable to agree on a long-term contract.

=== Melbourne Victory ===
Dowie rejoined Melbourne Victory for a fourth time in September 2018, signing a two-year permanent deal. She played 24 leagues matches and scored 16 goals during her two year period in the process helping the club to win the 2018–19 W-League Premiership. She was loaned to Vålerenga of the Toppserien in March 2019.

=== Reading ===
On 28 June 2021, Reading announced the signing of Dowie.

On 31 January 2023, Reading announced that Dowie had joined Liverpool on loan for the remainder of the 2022–23 season.

Dowie left Reading at the end of the 2022–23 season before announcing her retirement from the game on 21 September 2023.

== International career ==
Dowie was called into an England training camp while still a year ten pupil at Roundwood Park School. She has since represented England at Under-17, 19, 20 and 23 levels, playing in the FIFA Under-20's World Cup Finals in Chile in November 2008. She was included in coach Hope Powell's squad for the pre-Euro 2009 friendlies against Iceland and Denmark, but did not play and was left out of the final Euro 2009 squad.

She finally made her debut in a World Cup qualifier against Turkey in İzmir on 26 November 2009. Dowie was an 84th-minute substitute for Everton Ladies teammate Jody Handley. Six months later she won another cap as a substitute in a 6–0 win over Malta. Dowie remained on the fringes of the squad and her next appearance was not until September 2011. She was substituted at half time in a 2–2 draw with lowly Serbia.

Dowie was not selected for the 2011 FIFA Women's World Cup, for the Great Britain squad at the 2012 London Olympics, or for UEFA Women's Euro 2013. Her exclusion from the latter tournament was controversial as she was the WSL's leading goalscorer at the time.

When Hope Powell was sacked after England's Euro 2013 failure, interim coach Brent Hills immediately recalled Dowie. She came on as a substitute in England's first 2015 FIFA World Cup qualifier and scored her first national team goal in a 6–0 win over Belarus at Dean Court in Bournemouth. Dowie's continuing good form at club level meant it was something of a surprise when she was left out of England's 2015 FIFA Women's World Cup squad. Almost two years after her last cap in September 2014, she remained keen to play for England and hoped to win a recall from Hope Powell's successor Mark Sampson.

Dowie was allotted 173 when the FA announced their legacy numbers scheme to honour the 50th anniversary of England’s inaugural international.

== Coaching career ==
Dowie has a Uefa B FA Football coaching qualification and has worked as a coach with Watford, the Middlesex Centre of Excellence and Stevenage Borough.
Dowie is soon to begin coaching with ESAF – Elite Schools Academy of Football.

== Personal life ==
Dowie is the daughter of Bob Dowie and the niece of former Northern Ireland international footballer, Iain Dowie. Her paternal grandfather was born in Belfast. She was a player with Charlton Ladies whilst her uncle managed the men's side. Natasha's 2010 FA Women's Cup final goals against Arsenal Ladies came two hours after Hull City, managed by uncle Iain, were relegated from the Premier League. On 26 May 2016, she married former teammate Becky Easton.

== Career statistics ==
=== Club ===
As of match played 27 May 2023

Appearances and goals by club, season and competition
Club	Season	League			National cup		League cup		Continental		Other		Total	
Club	Season	Division	Apps	Goals	Apps	Goals	Apps	Goals	Apps	Goals	Apps	Goals	Apps	Goals
Melbourne Victory (loan)	2015–16	W-League	7	3	—		—		—		—		7	3
Doncaster Belles	2016	FA WSL	3	1	1	0	0	0	—		—		4	1
Boston Breakers	2016	NWSL	12	6	—		—		—		—		12	6
Boston Breakers	2017	NWSL	23	7	—		—		—		—		23	7
Boston Breakers	Total		35	13	0	0	0	0	0	0	0	0	35	13
Melbourne Victory (loan)	2016–17	A-League Women|W-League	12	9	—		—		—		—		12	9
Melbourne Victory (loan)	2017–18	A-League Women|W-League	12	6	—		—		—		—		12	6
Melbourne Victory (loan)	Total		24	15	0	0	0	0	0	0	0	0	24	15
Linköpings	2018	Damallsvenskan	11	10	2	1	—		2	0	—		15	11
Melbourne Victory	2018–19	A-League Women|W-League	13	9	—		—		—		—		13	9
Melbourne Victory	2019–20	A-League Women|W-League	13	7	—		—		—		—		13	7
Melbourne Victory	Total		26	16	0	0	0	0	0	0	0	0	26	16
Vålerenga (loan)	2019	Toppserien	18	11	3	8	—		—		—		21	19
A.C. Milan	2020–21	Serie A	21	12	3	2	—		—		1	0	25	14
Reading	2021–22	FA Women's Super League	16	6	2	0	3	1	—		—		21	7
Reading	2022–23	FA Women's Super League	10	1	0	0	3	3	—		—		11	4
Reading	Total		26	7	2	0	6	4	0	0	0	0	32	11
Liverpool (loan)	2022–23	WSL	7	2	0	0	0	0	—		—		7	2
Career total			178	90	11	11	6	4	2	0	1	0	198	105

=== International ===
Scores and results list England's goal tally first, score column indicates score after each Dowie goal.

List of international goals scored by Natasha Dowie
No.	Date	Venue	Opponent	Score	Result	Competition
1	21 September 2013	Dean Court, Bournemouth, England	Belarus	5–0	6–0	2015 FIFA Women's World Cup qualification
2	26 September 2013	Fratton Park, Portsmouth, England	Turkey	8–0	8–0	2015 FIFA Women's World Cup qualification
3	5 April 2014	Amex Stadium, Brighton, England	Montenegro	9–0	9–0	2015 FIFA Women's World Cup qualification
4	8 May 2014	Greenhous Meadow, Shrewsbury, England	Ukraine	1–0	4–0	2015 FIFA Women's World Cup qualification
5	8 May 2014	Greenhous Meadow, Shrewsbury, England	Ukraine	3–0	4–0	2015 FIFA Women's World Cup qualification

== Honours ==
Everton

- Women's FA Cup: 2009–10
- FA Women's National League Cup: 2007–08

Liverpool

- FA Women's Super League (2): 2013, 2014

Melbourne Victory

- W-League Premiership: 2018–19

Individual

- FA Women's Players' Player of the Year: 2013
- FA Women's Super League Top Scorer: 2013
- FA Women's Super League PFA Team of the Year: 2013–14
- FA Women's Super League Goal of the Month: January 2022
- FA Women's Cup Final Player of the Match: 2010
- W-League Golden Boot: 2018–19
- W-League Player of the Month: November 2016
- Liverpool Supporters' Player of the Year: 2015
- Liverpool Goal of the Season: 2015 (v. Sunderland)
- Everton Player of the Year: 2011
