= Elise Krieghoff =

American soccer player

Personal information
- Full name: Elise Dana Krieghoff
- Date of birth: November 18, 1993 (age 32)
- Place of birth: Fresno, California
- Height: 5 ft 8 in (1.73 m)
- Position: Forward

Team information
- Current team: Vålerenga
- Number: 13

College career
Years	Team	Apps	(Gls)
2012–2015	Cal Poly Mustangs		

Senior career*
Years	Team	Apps	(Gls)
2016	Boston Breakers	6	(1)
2017	Vålerenga	19	(7)
- * Club domestic league appearances and goals as of November 4, 2017

Elise Krieghoff (born November 18, 1993) is an American former professional soccer player who played as a forward for the Boston Breakers in the NWSL.

== College career ==
Krieghoff attended Cal Poly, ultimately inducted into the university's Hall of Fame in 2022. While with Cal Poly, Krieghoff was invited to train at a USWNT U-23 camp in 2014. Krieghoff's collegiate career also included making ESPN's "SportsCenter" Top 10 after scoring a goal which ranked No. 3 for the day of October 19, 2014.

Collegiate Statistics
Season	Apps.	Goals	Assists
2012 (Fr.)	15	11	0
2013 (So.)	19	21	3
2014 (Jr.)	20	14	4
2015 (Sr.)	17	6	1
Totals	71	52	8

== Professional career ==
Krieghoff signed with Boston in April 2016, and scored a goal in the 76th minute for the Breakers at Houston on September 11, 2016.

She signed with Vålerenga in December 2016. Krieghoff scored a 46th-minute goal for the club during a match featuring a record crowd of 3,541 in 2017 for a 2-0 win over Kolbotn.
