= Kristie Mewis =

American soccer player (born 1991)

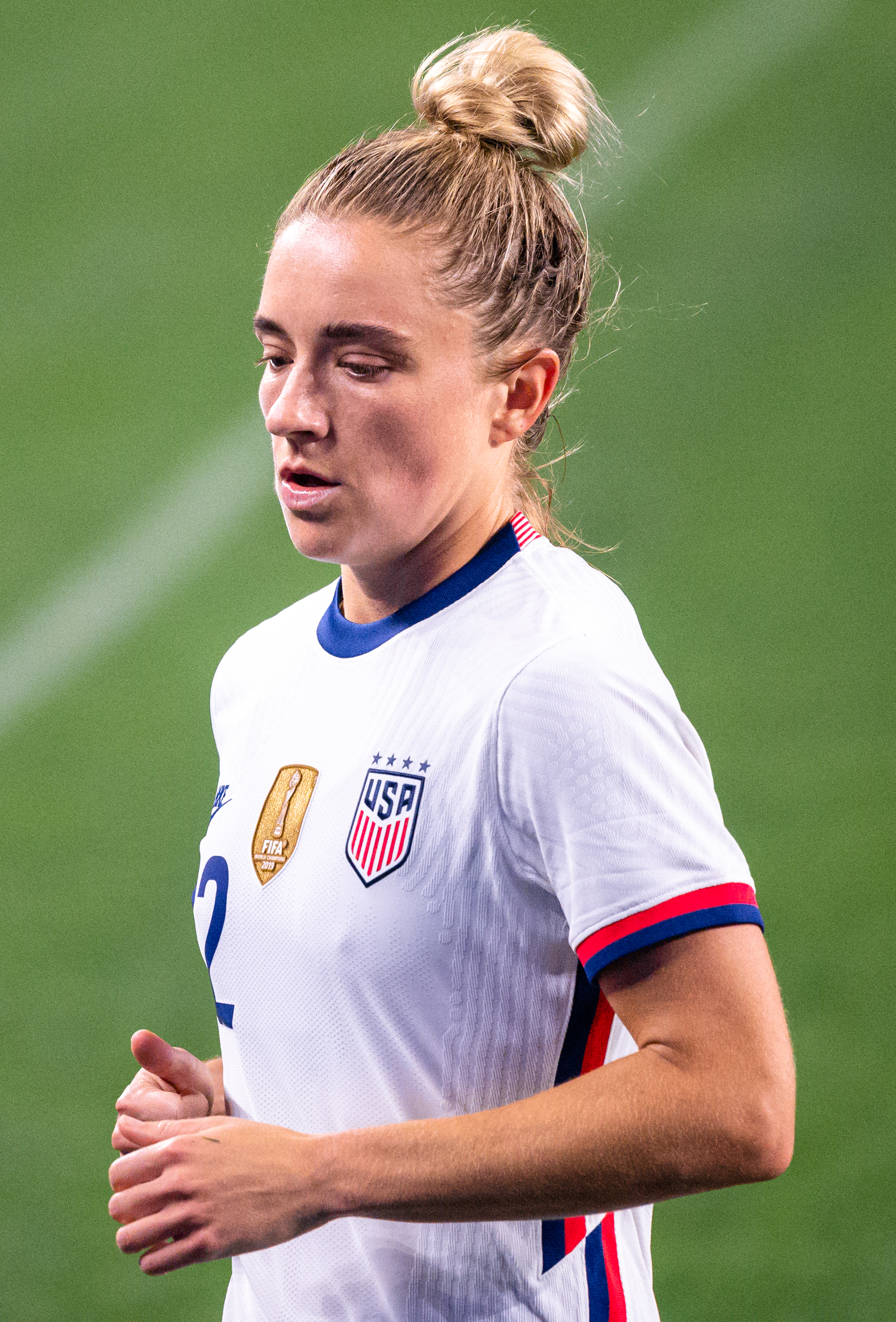
- Mewis in 2022

Personal information
- Full name: Kristen Anne Mewis
- Date of birth: February 25, 1991 (age 35)
- Place of birth: Weymouth, Massachusetts, U.S.
- Height: 5 ft 7 in (1.70 m)
- Position: Midfielder

Youth career
- SC Scorpions

College career
| Years | Team | Apps | (Gls) |
| 2009–2012 | Boston College Eagles | 61 | (33) |

Senior career*
| Years | Team | Apps | (Gls) |
| 2013 | Canberra United FC | 2 | (2) |
| 2013 | FC Kansas City | 20 | (1) |
| 2014–2016 | Boston Breakers | 51 | (10) |
| 2014 | → Iga FC Kunoichi (loan) | 7 | (5) |
| 2015–2016 | → Bayern Munich (loan) | 7 | (1) |
| 2017 | Washington Spirit | 14 | (2) |
| 2017 | Chicago Red Stars | 1 | (1) |
| 2017–2021 | Houston Dash | 58 | (11) |
| 2022–2023 | NJ/NY Gotham FC | 31 | (2) |
| 2023–2025 | West Ham United | 4 | (0) |

International career^{‡}
| 2008 | United States U17 | 16 | (9) |
| 2009–2010 | United States U20 | 26 | (6) |
- United States U23
| 2013–2023 | United States | 53 | (7) |
Medal record
Olympic Games
| Bronze medal – third place | 2020 Tokyo | Team |
CONCACAF W Championship
| Winner | 2022 Mexico |
- * Club domestic league appearances and goals as of October 13, 2024 ‡ National team caps and goals as of August 6, 2023

Mewis in 2026

Kristie Anne Mewis (born February 25, 1991) is an American professional soccer player who most recently played as a midfielder for West Ham United of the Women's Super League (WSL) and the United States national team.

== Early life ==
Mewis grew up in Hanson, Massachusetts, where she attended Whitman-Hanson Regional High School and played on the soccer team. She finished her high school career with 74 goals and 34 assists. She was a three-time NSCAA All-American, three-time All-New England and All-Massachusetts team honoree and a three-time Eastern Massachusetts Girls Soccer Association Div. 1 First-Team All-Star. In 2008, Mewis was named the NSCAA Youth Player of the Year and the US Soccer Young Female Athlete of the Year. In 2009, she was named to the Parade All-America team.

Mewis played for the Region 1 Olympic Development Program (ODP) team from 2003 to 2007. She played with her younger sister Sam at the 2008 FIFA U-17 Women's World Cup and the 2010 FIFA U-20 Women's World Cup.

=== Boston College, 2009–2012 ===
As a freshman at Boston College, Mewis recorded five goals and six assists, and was second on the team in shots taken with 72, bettered only by fellow Eagle and United States U-17 teammate, Vicki DiMartino. Mewis played and started in 23 games and tied for fourth on the team in scoring with five goals and six assists for 16 points. Mewis played midfield and filled in on defense due to injuries. She was named to the All-ACC Freshmen Team, the Top Drawer Soccer All-Rookie team, and Soccer America All-Rookie team and earned NSCAA All-Southeast Region first team honors.

During her sophomore year in 2010, Mewis started all 25 games on the season and led the Atlantic Coast Conference (ACC) in shots with 101. She scored ten goals, ranking seventh in the ACC and second for Boston. She was first on the team in assists with 14; tied for the ACC lead. She tied for fifth in the ACC in points with 34. Mewis set a school record by recording a goal or assist in 11 consecutive games from August 29 to October tallying seven goals and eight assists during the run. She was awarded ACC Player of the Week and CollegeSoccer360 Team of the Week honors on October 4. Mewis was named New England Soccer News Player of the Year and was an All-ACC first team selection. She was a Hermann Trophy semifinalist and a member of Soccer America MVP's first team. Mewis received NSCAA All-American first team accolades and was named to Top Drawer Soccer's second team. She was also the NSCAA Player of the Week on September 29.

In 2011, Mewis led the team in scoring eight goals and six assists for 22 points and was named the Offensive Team MVP. Starting and playing in 20 games during the season, Mewis logged 1,545 minutes of play while leading the team in shots with 81. She averaged 4.05 shots per game, ranking second in the ACC and was 11th in the ACC in points, with 22. Mewis was a NSCAA Division 1 All-America third team selection and earned NSCAA Southeast Regional first team honors. She was an all-ACC first team selection, was named to the Soccer America MVP second team, and was named to the Soccer America Preseason All-America list. Mewis was named to the Preseason Hermann Trophy Watch List and was a semifinalist for the award.

During her senior year, Mewis finished the 2012 season with a career-high 16 goals, 12 assists for a career-high 44 points. She recorded nine multi-point games (three or more points) and had a goal or assist in 15 of 21 games this season. Mewis is the all-time leading scorer in the Boston College program with 116 total points. After opening the season with a nine-game scoring streak, second to her personal and program record of 11 games which she accomplished in 2010, she was named a Division 1 ECAC All-Star and Hermann Trophy Semifinalist. Mewis received NSCAA First Team All-America and All-Southeast Region honors and was named to the TopDrawerSoccer.com Team of the Season – Upperclassmen – first team. She was named to the All-ACC first team and College Sports Madness All-American first team. Mewis tallied her first career hat trick in a match against Harvard. The three goals made her the all-time leader in points at Boston College. She finished her career with 39 goals, 38 assists, nine game-winning goals and 21 multiple-point games. She was the second player in program history to register a goal in five straight games.

== Club career ==
=== Canberra United FC, 2013 ===
Mewis signed with the Australian W-League team Canberra United FC to finish the final two weeks of the 2012–13 season. She made her first appearance for the club during a 5–0 win against the Western Sydney Wanderers FC on January 8 and scored the team's fifth goal in the 89th minute of the match. Her second and final appearance occurred on January 12 when the team was defeated 5–1 by eventual regular season champions, Brisbane Roar FC. Mewis scored Canberra's only goal of the match in the 45th minute. Canberra United finished fifth during the regular season with a 5–3–4 record.

=== FC Kansas City, 2013 ===
In January 2013, Mewis was drafted in the first round (third pick overall) of the 2013 NWSL College Draft to FC Kansas City for the inaugural season of the National Women's Soccer League. She was elevated to U.S. Soccer-subsidized status during the year. She started in the league's inaugural match on April 13, 2013, as Kansas City drew 1–1 against the Portland Thorns, also the game in which she became the first player in NWSL history to be shown a yellow card. She scored her first goal of the season in the 74th minute of the Blues' 3–2 win over Portland Thorns FC on May 8. Mewis made 20 starts as a rookie for FC Kansas City during the regular season helping the team finish second in the standings with an 11–5–6 record. The team advanced to the playoffs but were defeated 3–2 in the semifinals by Portland.

=== Boston Breakers, 2014–2016 ===
In November 2013, FC Kansas City traded Mewis to Seattle Reign FC for Amy Rodriguez. Of the trade, Reign FC coach, Laura Harvey said, "Kristie is a young, bright and talented player who we feel can benefit our long-term plan. She has proven that she can be a high-level player in this environment and we feel we have the structure to help push Kristie to the next level." On November 18, 2013, she was traded alongside Michelle Betos and two 2015 NWSL College Draft picks to the Boston Breakers for Sydney Leroux.

She started in 15 games and scored 3 goals in 2014 for the Breakers.

==== Iga FC Kunoichi, 2014 (loan) ====
October 2014 Mewis signed a three-month contract with Iga FC Kunoichi of the Japanese Nadeshiko League first division. Wearing number 31 and playing as a forward, Mewis scored five goals in seven games, which included two braces. During matches in which she played, Iga FC compiled a record of 6–1.

==== FC Bayern Munich, 2015 (loan) ====
In August 2015, Mewis signed a one-year contract with Bayern Munich.

=== Washington Spirit, 2016–2017 ===
In November 2016, Mewis was traded along with Kassey Kallman from the Boston Breakers to the Washington Spirit for Megan Oyster.

=== Chicago Red Stars, 2017 ===
On August 21, 2017, Mewis was traded to the Chicago Red Stars for their first round draft pick in the 2018 NWSL College Draft. In her first and only game for the Red Stars (against her previous team), she scored a goal in the first half helping to secure a victory for the Red Stars and eliminating the Spirit from playoff contention.

=== Houston Dash, 2017–2021 ===
On August 30, 2017, about a week after being traded to the Chicago Red Stars, Mewis was traded to the Houston Dash for USWNT player Morgan Brian with additional, undisclosed future considerations going to Houston.

Mewis was voted onto the NWSL's May 2018 Team of the Month.

During a game in May 2018 vs the Washington Spirit, Mewis tore her ACL. Mewis returned stronger in 2019 with a new mindset stating: "Me tearing my ACL was kind of a blessing in disguise because I feel like it just woke me up a little bit. It just made me ask myself, 'Kristie, what are you doing? You need to come back from this. You're being OK with being 70 or 80 percent,'" she continued, "It was just hard to admit to myself that I wasn't happy with where I was. But I think I just woke up one day and was like, 'Let's do this.'". The next year, Mewis would go on to help the Houston Dash win their first trophy at the 2020 NWSL Challenge Cup.

=== Gotham FC, 2022–2023 ===
On December 16, 2021, Mewis was selected by NWSL expansion club San Diego Wave FC in the 2022 NWSL Expansion Draft and subsequently traded to Gotham FC in exchange for $200,000 in allocation money. In the 2023 NWSL semifinal, Mewis made an assist to Katie Stengel, who made the game 1–0 against Portland Thorns and sent Gotham FC to the final, where they won. In December 2023, Mewis and Gotham FC mutually agreed to part ways.

=== West Ham United, 2023–2025 ===
On December 22, 2023, Mewis joined Women's Super League club, West Ham United. She made her debut for the club on January 21, 2024, coming on as a substitute for Honoka Hayashi in the 62nd minute, assisting a goal in the 4–3 loss against Tottenham Hotspur. On June 30, 2025, it was announced that she was departing the club upon the expiry of her contract.

== International career ==
=== Youth teams ===
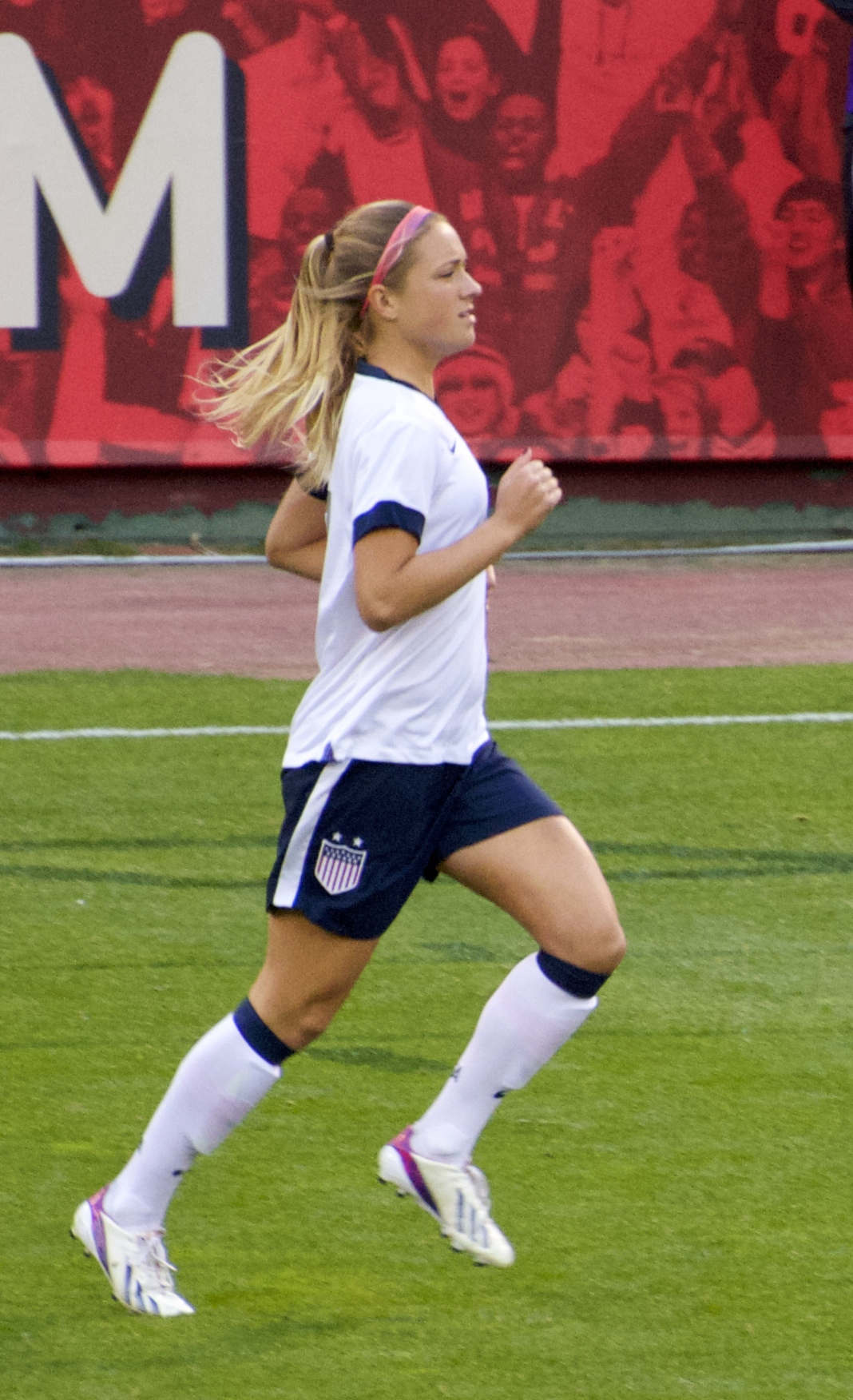
Candlestick Park, October 2013

Mewis co-captained the United States U-17 team that was runner-up at the inaugural 2008 FIFA U-17 Women's World Cup in New Zealand. Over the course of the tournament, Mewis scored two goals. She was the recipient of the Bronze Ball as the tournament's third-best player. Mewis also played in the 2010 U-20 Women's World Cup in Germany where the team lost in the quarterfinals. Mewis's younger sister Sam was also a member of both youth World Cup squads.

=== Senior team ===
In January 2013, Mewis was called to the national training camp by head coach Tom Sermanni in preparation for a friendly match against Scotland. She made her debut for the senior team on February 9, 2013, against Scotland and was placed on the roster for 2013 Algarve Cup. Mewis scored the game-opening goal in the third minute of a friendly match against South Korea on June 15, 2013, near her hometown in Massachusetts.

After earning 15 caps between 2013 and 2014, Mewis fell off the national team radar. Following a five-year absence, she was called back up to a USWNT talent identification training camp in December 2019 by new coach Vlatko Andonovski. She was called to the full senior team training camps in both October and November 2020 prior to a friendly against the Netherlands. Mewis came on as a second-half substitute against the Netherlands, marking her first appearance in over six years, and scoring in the 70th minute. Her second international goal came 2,722 days after her first in June 2013, the longest span between goals in team history.

In October 2020, after winning the Challenge Cup with the Houston Dash, Mewis credited her improvement in form to the process of recovering from an anterior cruciate ligament injury she suffered in 2018, particularly citing how it forced her to re-evaluate her competitive mentality. Following her recovery, Mewis returned the Dash in May 2019, and her improved form was rewarded with her first national team call-up in more than three years.

On June 21, 2023, Andonovski named Mewis to the United States squad for the 2023 FIFA Women's World Cup in Australia. While she did not feature during the group stage, she made her first World Cup appearance during the game against Sweden, coming on in the last minute of extra time before the penalty shootout. With her first and only touch in the World Cup, Mewis converted her shot, putting the U.S. up 3–2. However, the team went on to miss three of the next four penalties, eliminating the U.S. from the World Cup in the Round of 16.

== Personal life ==
Mewis is the older sister of Sam Mewis, who also played on the United States women's national soccer team. She previously dated Houston Dash teammate Rachel Daly. Since the beginning of 2021, Mewis has been in a relationship with Australian soccer player Sam Kerr. Mewis and Kerr were engaged in 2023 and married in December 2025. They have a son, born in May 2025.

=== Television and film ===
Mewis appeared in the Netflix documentary series Under Pressure: The U.S. Women's World Cup Team, which follows the U.S. women's national soccer team as they compete in the 2023 World Cup. The docuseries premiered on December 12, 2023.

== Career statistics ==
=== Club ===
As of October 13, 2024

| Club | Season | Division | League | | League Cup (Note: Includes NWSL Playoffs, W-League playoffs, and Nadeshiko League regulation playoffs) | | NWSL Challenge Cup (Note: Includes NWSL Challenge Cups and NWSL Fall Series) | | Continental (Note: Includes 2021 Women's International Champions Cup) | | Total | |
| Club | Season | Division | Apps | Goals | Apps | Goals | Apps | Goals | Apps | Goals | Apps | Goals |
|---|---|---|---|---|---|---|---|---|---|---|---|---|
| Canberra United FC | 2012–13 | W-League | 2 | 2 | — | | — | | — | | 2 | 2 |
| FC Kansas City | 2013 | NWSL | 20 | 1 | 1 | 0 | — | | — | | 21 | 1 |
| Boston Breakers | 2014 | NWSL | 17 | 3 | — | | — | | — | | 17 | 3 |
| Boston Breakers | 2015 | NWSL | 20 | 6 | — | | — | | — | | 20 | 6 |
| Boston Breakers | 2016 | NWSL | 14 | 1 | — | | — | | — | | 14 | 1 |
| Washington Spirit | 2017 | NWSL | 14 | 2 | — | | — | | — | | 14 | 2 |
| Chicago Red Stars | 2017 | NWSL | 1 | 1 | — | | — | | — | | 1 | 1 |
| Houston Dash | 2017 | NWSL | 5 | 0 | — | | — | | — | | 5 | 0 |
| Houston Dash | 2018 | NWSL | 11 | 2 | — | | — | | — | | 11 | 2 |
| Houston Dash | 2019 | NWSL | 22 | 4 | — | | — | | — | | 22 | 4 |
| Houston Dash | 2020 | NWSL | — | | — | | 11 | 3 | — | | 11 | 3 |
| Houston Dash | 2021 | NWSL | 16 | 3 | — | | 2 | 2 | 1 | 0 | 19 | 5 |
| NJ/NY Gotham FC | 2022 | NWSL | 18 | 2 | — | | 5 | 2 | — | | 12 | 3 |
| NJ/NY Gotham FC | 2023 | NWSL | 13 | 0 | 1 | 0 | 2 | 0 | — | | 15 | 0 |
| NJ/NY Gotham FC | Total | | 173 | 27 | 2 | 0 | 20 | 7 | 1 | 0 | 196 | 34 |
| West Ham United | 2023–24 | WSL | 3 | 0 | — | | — | | — | | 3 | 0 |
| West Ham United | 2024–25 | WSL | 1 | 0 | 0 | 0 | — | | — | | 1 | 0 |
| West Ham United | Total | | 4 | 0 | 0 | 0 | 0 | 0 | 0 | 0 | 4 | 0 |
| Iga FC Kunoichi Mie (loan) | 2014 | Nadeshiko League | — | | 7 | 5 | — | | — | | 7 | 5 |
| FC Bayern Munich (loan) | 2015–16 | Frauen-Bundesliga | 7 | 1 | 0 | 0 | — | | 2 | 0 | 9 | 1 |
| FC Bayern Munich (loan) | Total | | 7 | 1 | 7 | 5 | 0 | 0 | 0 | 0 | 16 | 6 |
| Career total | | | 184 | 28 | 9 | 5 | 20 | 7 | 3 | 0 | 214 | 40 |

=== International ===
As of match played August 6, 2023

| National Team | Year | Apps | Goals | Assists |
|---|---|---|---|---|
United States
| United States | 2013 | 10 | 1 | 2 |
| United States | 2014 | 5 | 0 | 0 |
| United States | 2015 | – | – | – |
| United States | 2016 | – | – | – |
| United States | 2017 | – | – | – |
| United States | 2018 | – | – | – |
| United States | 2019 | – | – | – |
| United States | 2020 | 1 | 1 | 0 |
| United States | 2021 | 17 | 2 | 2 |
| United States | 2022 | 13 | 3 | 0 |
| United States | 2023 | 7 | 0 | 0 |
| Total | | 53 | 7 | 4 |

=== International goals ===
| No. | Cap | Date | Venue | Opponent | Minute | Assist | Score | Result | Competition |
|---|---|---|---|---|---|---|---|---|---|
| 1 | 6 | June 15, 2013 | Foxborough, Massachusetts | South Korea | 3' | Sydney Leroux | 1-0 | 4-1 | Friendly |
| 2 | 16 | November 27, 2020 | Breda, Netherlands | Netherlands | 70' | Lynn Williams | 2-0 | 2–0 | Friendly |
| 3 | 17 | January 18, 2021 | Orlando, Florida | Colombia | 85' | Carli Lloyd | 4-0 | 4–0 | Friendly |
| 4 | 21 | February 24, 2021 | Orlando, Florida | Argentina | 41' | Casey Krueger | 4-0 | 6–0 | 2021 SheBelieves Cup |
| 5 | 36 | February 23, 2022 | Frisco, Texas | Iceland | 88' | Margaret Purce | 5-0 | 5–0 | 2022 SheBelieves Cup |
| 6 | 42 | July 7, 2022 | Guadalupe, Mexico | Jamaica | 83' | penalty kick | 4-0 | 5–0 | 2022 CONCACAF Championship |
| 7 | 43 | July 11, 2022 | San Nicolás de los Garza, Mexico | Mexico | 89' | unassisted | 1-0 | 1–0 | 2022 CONCACAF Championship |

== Honors and awards ==
Houston Dash

- NWSL Challenge Cup: 2020

NJ/NY Gotham FC

- NWSL Championship: 2023

United States

- CONCACAF Women's Championship: 2022
- Olympic Bronze Medal: 2020
- SheBelieves Cup: 2021; 2022; 2023

Individual

- United States Soccer Federation Young Female Athlete of the Year: 2008
- She holds the 300 meters (42.2 s) and 600 meters (1:37) indoor track records at Whitman-Hanson Regional High School.

== See also ==
- List of United States women's international soccer players
- 2008 FIFA U-17 Women's World Cup squads
- List of foreign W-League (Australia) players
- List of Boston College people
- List of LGBT sportspeople
