= Lauren Lazo =

American professional soccer player (born 1993)

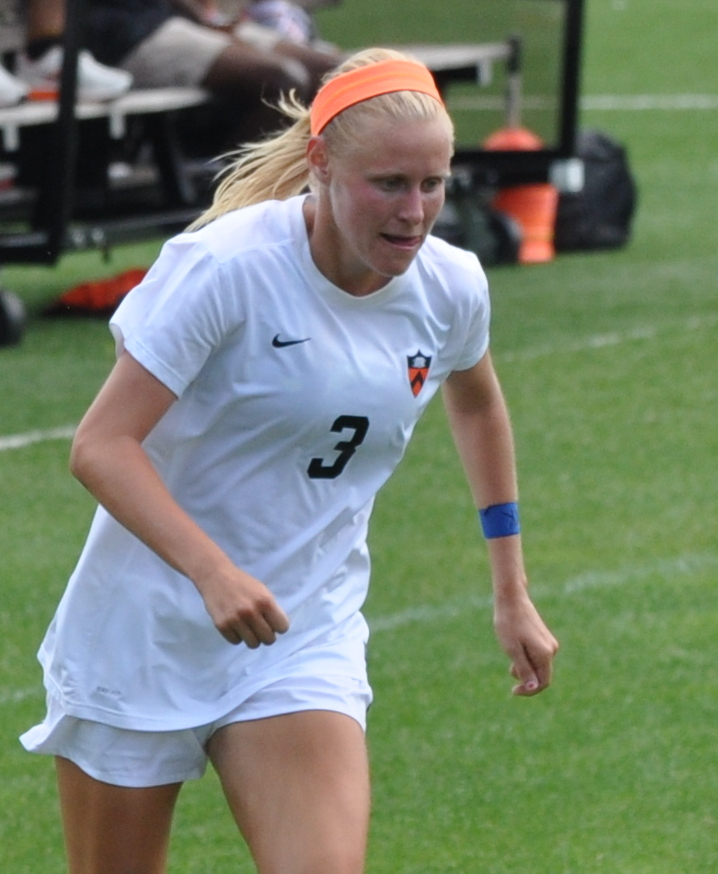
- Lazo with Princeton in 2013

Personal information
- Full name: Lauren Taylor Lazo
- Date of birth: May 5, 1993 (age 33)
- Place of birth: Billings, Montana
- Height: 5 ft 9 in (1.75 m)
- Position: Defender

College career
Years	Team	Apps	(Gls)
2011–2014	Princeton Tigers		

Senior career*
Years	Team	Apps	(Gls)
2015	Boston Breakers	14	(1)
- * Club domestic league appearances and goals as of August 30, 2015

Lauren Taylor Lazo (born May 5, 1993) is an American professional soccer player who played for the Boston Breakers in the National Women's Soccer League.

== Career ==
=== College and amateur ===
Lazo played college soccer at Princeton University between 2011 and 2014. During her time at Princeton, Lazo was First-Team NSCAA All-Mid-Atlantic Region, Second-Team All-ECAC, and First-Team All-Ivy League in 2014, Second-Team All-Ivy League in 2013, NSCAA Second-Team All-Mid-Atlantic region and First-Team All-Ivy League in 2012, and Honorable Mention All-Ivy League in 2011. She finished her career with 82 points on 28 goals and 26 assists.

During her time in college, Lazo also played for Women's Premier Soccer League club Phoenix del Sol and W-League club LA-Blues.

=== Professional ===
Lazo signed with the Boston Breakers on May 14, 2015, as a discovery player. During the 2015 season, she made 14 appearances for the club and scored 1 goal.

== Personal ==
Lazo is the daughter of Mark and Pamela Lazo. She has an older brother, Alex Lazo.

It was announced on April 4, 2016, that Lazo would be waived by the Boston Breakers.

On November 13, 2022, Lauren married fellow Princeton soccer alum Julian Griggs.
