= Rachel Wood (archaeologist) =

Australian archeologist

- Awards: Women in Research Citation Award

Academic background
- Education: University of Oxford
- Thesis: The contribution of new radiocarbon dating pre-treatment techniques to understanding the Middle to Upper Palaeolithic transition in Iberia (2011)

Academic work
- Institutions: The Australian National University, University of Oxford

Rachel Wood is a specialist in the radiocarbon dating of Pleistocene archaeological sites. She is the director of the Oxford Radiocarbon Accelerator Unit (ORAU) at the University of Oxford.

== Education ==
She studied Chemistry and Archaeology at Durham University, graduating in 2005 with a BSc. In 2006, she completed a MSc in Archaeological Science at the University of Oxford.

Wood completed a DPhil in Archaeological Science at the University of Oxford in 2011, based in the Research Laboratory for Archaeology and the History of Art and Keble College. The thesis was entitled 'The contribution of new radiocarbon dating pre-treatment techniques to understanding the Middle to Upper Palaeolithic transition in Iberia'', supervised by Thomas Higham.

== Career ==
She joined the Australian National University after completing her DPhil, working on pre-treatment of samples for radiocarbon dating. In 2014, Wood was awarded a DECRA fellowship to investigate tooth enamel diagenesis and its impact on radiocarbon dating.

Her early work focused on the Middle and Upper Palaeolithic of Iberia. This included refining radiocarbon dating techniques for bone and charcoal. The utilisation of the ultrafiltration method showed that Neanderthals were not contemporary to anatomically modern humans in southern Iberia. More recent work has used radiocarbon dating to assess the colonization of Australia, as at Riwi, Kimberley.

In 2016 she was awarded with the Women in Research Citation Award, presented by The Australian National University and Clarivate Analytics. She has written a number of popular science articles on radiocarbon dating.

She became director of the Oxford Radiocarbon Accelerator Unit in 2022.

== Selected publications ==
- Wood, Rachel Elizabeth, et al. 2013. A new date for the Neanderthals from El Sidrón Cave (Asturias, northern Spain). Archaeometry 55.1: 148–158.
- Wood, Rachel Elizabeth, et al. 2014. The chronology of the earliest Upper Palaeolithic in northern Iberia: new insights from L'Arbreda, Labeko Koba and La Viña. Journal of Human Evolution 69: 91–109. https://doi.org/10.1016/j.jhevol.2013.12.017
- Wood, R 2015. From revolution to convention: the past, present and future of radiocarbon dating. Journal of Archaeological Science 56: 61–72.
- Wood, R, De Quiros, F, Maíllo-Fernandez, J et al. 2016. El Castillo (Cantabria, northern Iberia) and the Transitional Aurignacian: Using radiocarbon dating to assess site taphonomy. Quaternary International, pp. 1–15.
- Wood, R, Jacobs, Z, Vannieuwenhuyse, D et al. 2016. Towards an accurate and precise chronology for the colonization of Australia: The example of Riwi, Kimberley, Western Australia. PLOS ONE 11, no. 9, pp. 25pp.
