= Jordan Field =

Harvard University stadium

Coordinates: 42°22′4.3″N 71°7′47.0″W

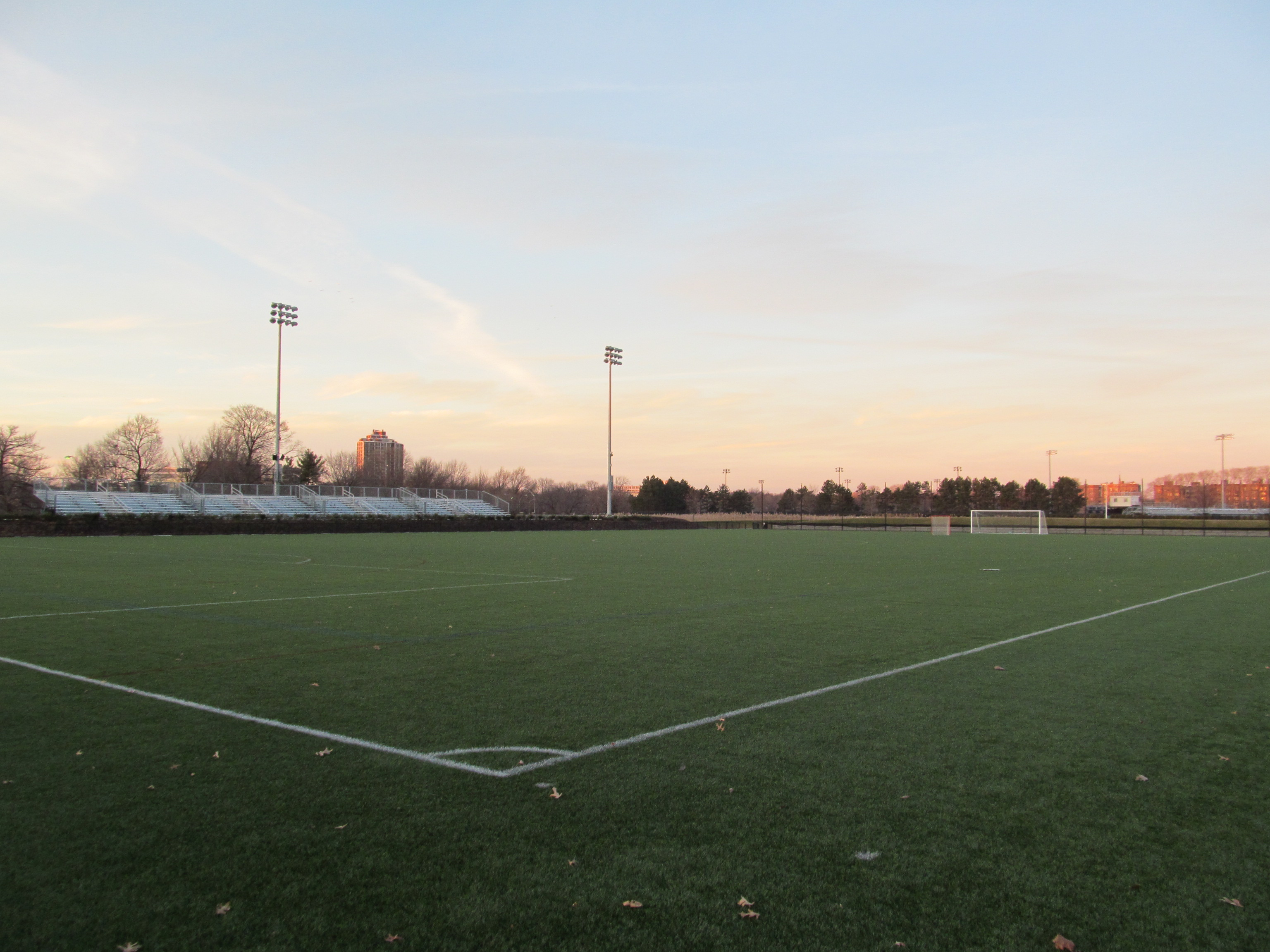
- Interior view of the stadium in 2011
- Interactive map of Jordan Field
- Full name: Gerald Jordan Field
- Former names: Soldiers Field Soccer Stadium (201015)
- Address: Boston, MA; United States
- Owner: Harvard University
- Capacity: 4,100
- Type: Stadium
- Surface: FieldTurf
- Field size: 116 × 74 yards
- Current use: Soccer; Lacrosse

Construction
- Opened: 2010

Tenant
- Harvard Crimson (NCAA) teams: men's and women's soccer; men's and women's lacrosse; Professional teams: Boston Breakers (2015–2017)

Website
- gocrimson.com/jordan-field

Jordan Field (formerly called Soldiers Field Soccer Stadium) is a stadium on the campus of Harvard University in the Allston neighborhood of Boston. (Although the core of the Harvard campus is in Cambridge, the athletic complex lies within Boston).

The stadium is the current home venue for the Harvard Crimson Harvard Crimson men's soccer and women's soccer and men's and women's lacrosse teams. It is named after Gerald Jordan '61, a former Harvard Crimson football player.

== History ==
It first opened in September 2010 and replaced Ohiri Field as the primary home of the Harvard Crimson men's and women's teams, as part of becoming the home venue for the Harvard men's and lacrosse teams.

It hosted a 2010 playoff match for the Boston Breakers of the Women's Professional Soccer league due to conflicts with the team's former primary home, Harvard Stadium.

In June 2013, the New England Revolution played host to the New York Red Bulls in a US Open Cup Round-of-16 game, marking the first time in Revolution history the team played a game within the Boston city limits.

Renovations were completed in early 2015, and it was the official home stadium and training venue of the Boston Breakers from 2015 to 2017.
