= Nkem Ezurike =

Canadian soccer player

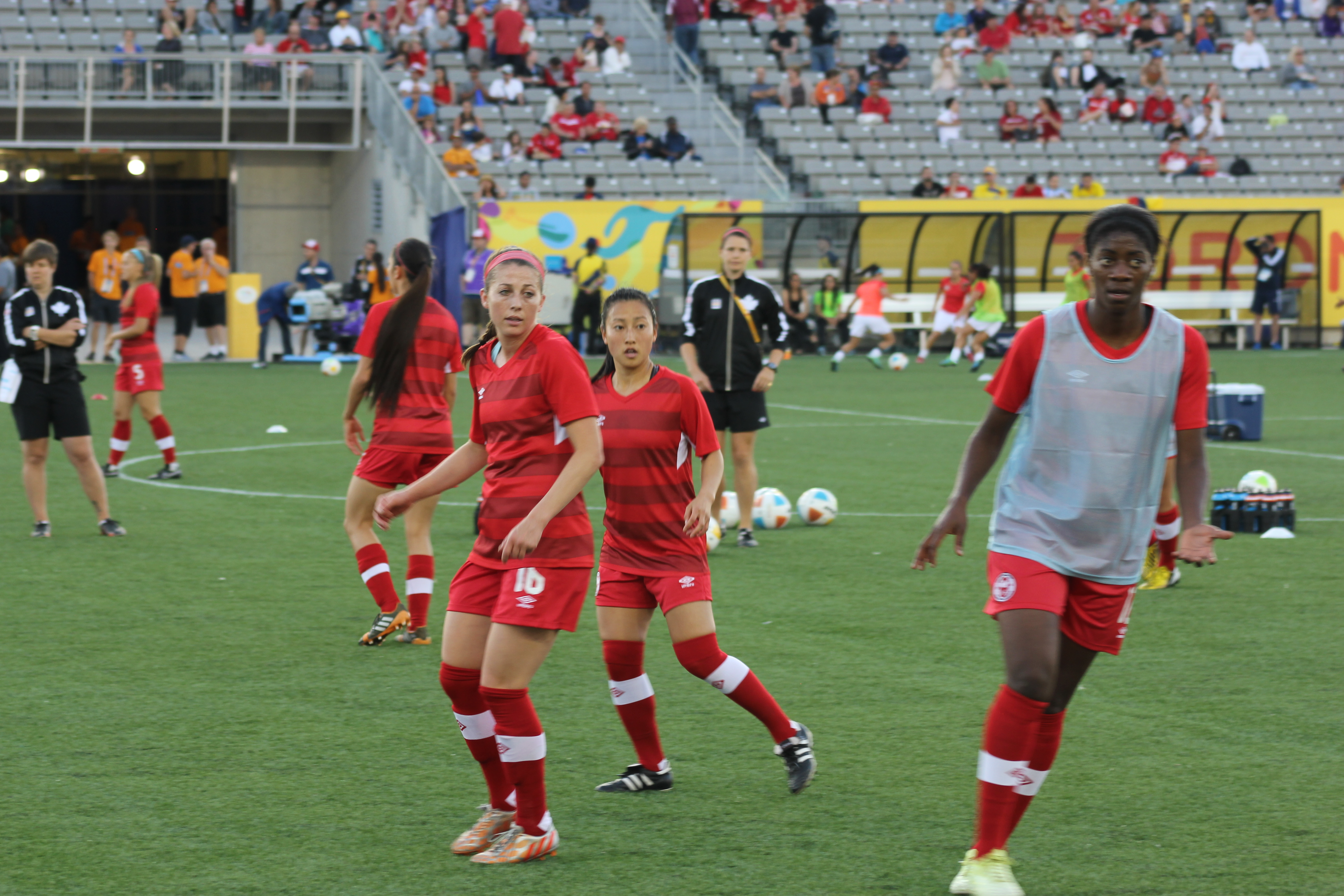
- Ezurike in 2015 #12

Personal information
- Full name: Nkemjika Natalie Ezurike
- Date of birth: March 19, 1992 (age 34)
- Place of birth: Halifax, Nova Scotia, Canada
- Height: 1.80 m (5 ft 11 in)
- Position: Forward

College career
Years	Team	Apps	(Gls)
2010–2013	Michigan Wolverines		

Senior career*
Years	Team	Apps	(Gls)
2012–2013	Laval Comets		
2014–2015	Boston Breakers	23	(3)
2016	Vittsjö GIK	18	(1)
2017	Mallbackens IF	25	(7)
2019–	ASA Tel Aviv		

International career^{‡}
2008	Canada U-17	7	(2)
2012	Canada U-20	6	(3)
2014–2015	Canada	5	(0)
- * Club domestic league appearances and goals as of December 28, 2017 ‡ National team caps and goals as of January 14, 2015

Nkemjika Natalie Ezurike (born March 19, 1992) is a Canadian soccer player. She has played as a forward for the Canada women's national soccer team and Israeli club ASA Tel Aviv.

== Early life ==
Ezurike was born in Halifax, Nova scotia, and attended Sackville High School in Lower Sackville.

=== University of Michigan ===
Ezurike attended the University of Michigan where she played for the Wolverines from 2010 to 2013.

== Club career ==
In 2012 and 2013, she played with the Laval Comets in the USL W-League.

Ezurike was selected eighth overall by the Boston Breakers in the 2014 NWSL College Draft and later signed with the team.

On January 14, 2016 she signed with Vittsjö GIK in the Damallsvenskan.

Ezurike signed with Mallbackens IF for the 2017 season.

== International career ==
Ezurike made her debut for the Canada women's national soccer team in 2014. She was named to Canada's squad for the 2015 Pan American Games in Toronto.

== Honours ==
Canada U-20

Runner-up

- CONCACAF Women's U-20 Championship: 2012
