= Maddy Evans =

American retired soccer midfielder and defender

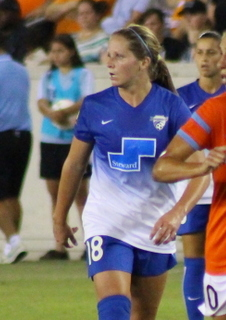

Personal information
- Full name: Madlyn Whitney Evans
- Date of birth: April 21, 1991 (age 35)
- Place of birth: Philadelphia, Pennsylvania, United States
- Height: 5 ft 6 in (1.68 m)
- Positions: Midfielder; defender

College career
Years	Team	Apps	(Gls)
2009–12	Penn State Nittany Lions		

Senior career*
Years	Team	Apps	(Gls)
2013–2015	Boston Breakers	46	(2)
2016–2017	Orlando Pride	28	(0)
2016–2017	Brisbane Roar	12	(0)
- * Club domestic league appearances and goals

Madlyn Whitney Evans (born April 21, 1991) is an American retired soccer midfielder and defender.

== Early life ==
Born in Philadelphia and raised in Glenside, Pennsylvania to Grant and Elizabeth Evans, Maddy attended Abington Senior High School where she played four varsity sports, Cross Country, Track, Soccer, and Lacrosse. Named to the Southeastern Pennsylvania Coaches' All-Star Team (soccer), All-Suburban One Second Team (X-Country). As of 2016, holds the 800-meter and one mile run records (track). During her junior and senior years, she opted to play varsity lacrosse. Evans was ranked 41st in the ESPN Rise Girls' Soccer Top 50 Rankings.

Evans was a seven-year member of the club team, FC Bucks Vipers and helped lead the team to its first ever U.S. Youth Championship in 2009. She was named the Golden Boot winner after scoring five goals at the Nationals, including the game-winning goal during the championship game. With the team, she won seven Eastern Pennsylvania State Cups, a Region I Premier League Championship, and two Region I Championships. She was also a seven-year member of the Eastern Pennsylvania and Region I Olympic Development Program (ODP) teams, with whom she competed internationally. She was named MVP of the 2009 Kuban Spring Tournament in Russia and captained the 2008 Pennsylvania ODP team that won the Region I Championship.

=== Penn State Nittany Lions ===
Evans attended Pennsylvania State University and played for the Nittany Lions from 2009 to 2012. During her senior year, she served as the team captain and played a pivotal role in leading the Nittany Lions to the College Cup Final. Evans finished her collegiate career with 11 goals, 9 assists, and 31 points. She was named a 2012 All-Big Ten Second Team selection. She made the Penn State record books on August 26, 2011, when she scored the second fastest goal in the program's history. She scored within the first 62 seconds of a winning match against West Virginia. During the game, she also tallied one assist.

== Club career ==
=== Boston Breakers, 2013–2015 ===
In 2013, Evans was selected by the Boston Breakers during the fourth round (29th overall) of the 2013 NWSL College Draft. Not signed initially after training camp, she was called up as an amateur player when international players were called up to their national teams in late May. She played three seasons in Boston, making 46 appearances, including 23 starts.

=== Orlando Pride, 2016–2017 ===
In November 2015, Evans was selected by Orlando Pride in the NWSL Expansion Draft.

==== Brisbane Roar, 2016/2017 ====
Evans joined Brisbane Roar on loan for the 2016–17 W-League.

=== Retirement ===
On August 11, 2017 Evans announced that she will be retiring from professional soccer. She played her final match on August 12, 2017.
