= Kassey Kallman =

American soccer player (born 1992)

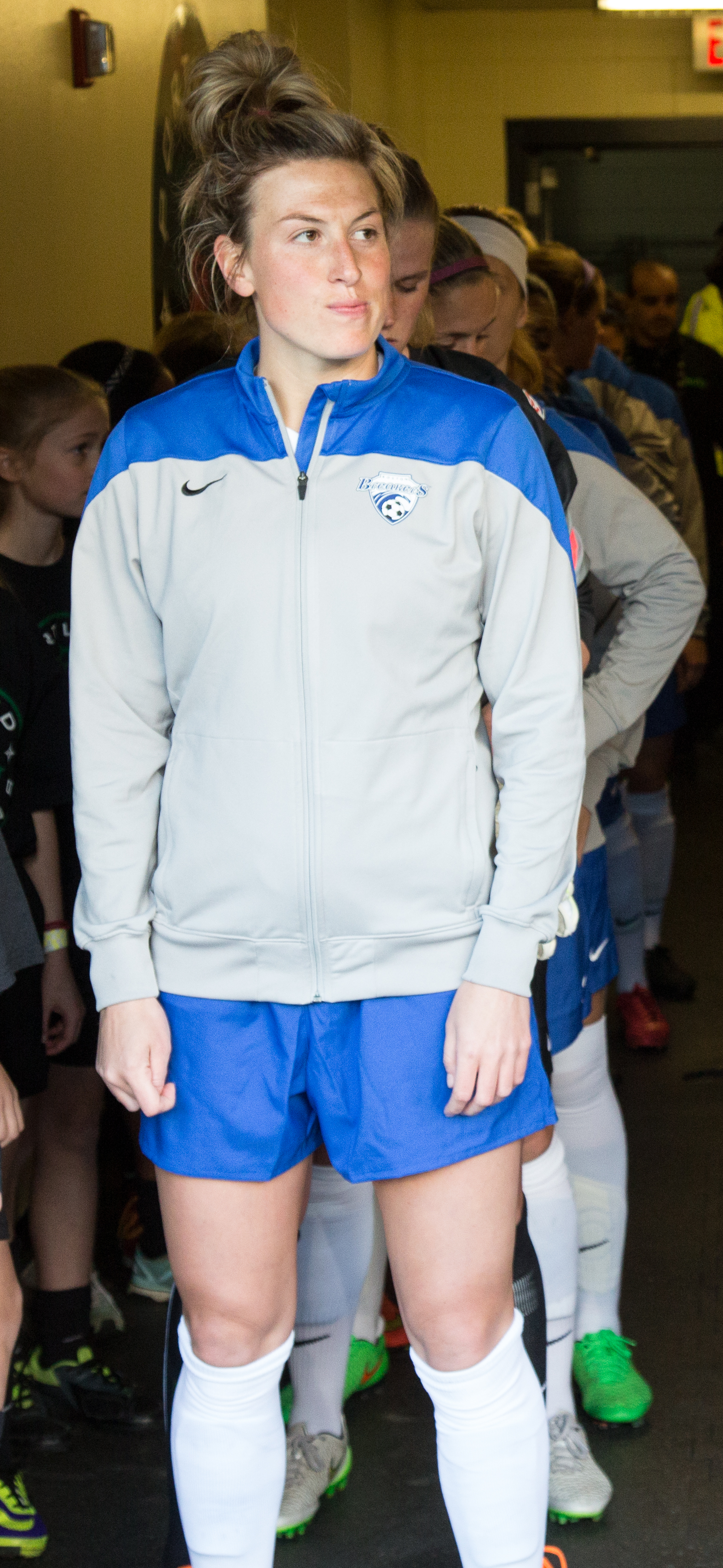
- Kallman with the Boston Breakers in 2015

Personal information
- Full name: Kassey Lee Kallman
- Date of birth: May 6, 1992 (age 34)
- Place of birth: Woodbury, Minnesota, U.S.
- Height: 1.73 m (5 ft 8 in)
- Position: Defender

Youth career
- 2001–2011: Woodbury Inferno
- 2006–2010: Woodbury Senior High School

College career
Years	Team	Apps	(Gls)
2010–2013	Florida State Seminoles	94	(10)

Senior career*
Years	Team	Apps	(Gls)
2014	FC Kansas City	18	(0)
2015–2016	Boston Breakers	40	(0)
2017	Washington Spirit	17	(0)

International career^{‡}
2011–2012	United States U20		
2013–2014	United States U23		
- * Club domestic league appearances and goals as of November 20, 2016 ‡ National team caps and goals as of April 30, 2014

Kassey Lee Kallman (born May 6, 1992) is an American former professional soccer player who played as a defender. She played college soccer for the Florida State Seminoles before playing professionally for FC Kansas City, the Boston Breakers, and the Washington Spirit of the National Women's Soccer League (NWSL).

== Early life ==
Kassey is the daughter of Rich and Laura Kallman. She has three brothers – Brian, Brad and Brent – and two sisters – Krystle and Kylie. Brian and Brent both played college soccer at Creighton University and both played professionally in the North American Soccer League for Minnesota United before Brent joined their MLS iteration; Krystle and Kylie both played collegiately at The University of Minnesota, where Krystle currently serves as an assistant coach.

Kallman was the team captain at Woodbury Senior High School, earning All-American honors as a senior and All-State honors as a junior and senior. She helped her team to Minnesota state titles as a freshman and junior, third place in state as a sophomore, and second place as a senior. As a senior, she was The Minnesota Player of the Year, Minnesota's Ms. Soccer, ESPN Rise Player of the Year, and Minnesota Gatorade Player of the Year.

Kallman also played U-9 through U-19 for Woodbury Inferno, helping them win the state title from 2005 to 2011 and win the regional championship in 2011.

== College career ==
Kallman burst onto the ACC women's soccer scene, leading the Seminoles her freshman year in minutes played and was the only true freshman to start every game while being named Second-Team All-ACC, to the All-ACC Freshman Team and was a Soccer America First-Team Freshman All-American. That year, Kallman scored her first collegiate goal against in-state rival the Florida Gators in the 89th minute to send that game into overtime.

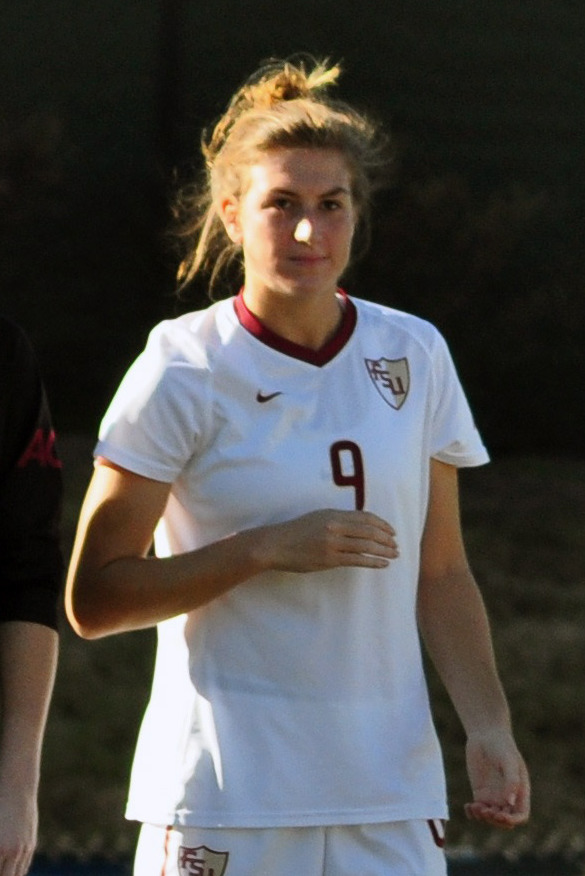
Kallman with Florida State in 2013

Kallmann followed that up as a sophomore by playing every minute of all 26 games for Florida State while helping the Seminoles to their first ACC Championship and fifth NCAA College Cup appearance. She was then named captain for her junior year, leading The Seminole defense that blanked their first eight ACC opponents en route to claiming the ACC regular season title for the second time in school history, and continued her senior when she was a Hermann Trophy Semifinalist and Honda Award finalist. She was the first player from Florida State to be named ACC Defensive Player of the Year and even from the backline, Kallman had two important game winning goals in a senior campaign that came just short of a national championship, losing to UCLA in the final. That year she led a Seminole defense ranked in the top 25 nationally in goals against average (7th) and shutout percentage (17th), while their 15 shutouts are the second most in school history – two off the school record of 17 set her junior year.

Kallman tallied 94 career starts in four seasons at Florida State with 27 points on 10 goals and seven assists, tying her for the seventh most starts in school history. She was a fixture in the Seminole backline her entire four years in college and led Florida State to three straight College Cup appearances (2011, 2012 & 2013), two ACC titles (2011 & 2013) and a conference regular season championship in 2012. In 2013, Kallman was named the ACC Defensive Player of the Year, garnered Most Valuable Player honors at the ACC Tournament, and earned a spot on the All-ACC first team and All-Tournament team. She was also a finalist for the Senior CLASS Award. For the second year in a row, Kallman was named a second team Academic All-American by Capital One becoming the program's first two-time Academic All-American.

== Club career ==
=== FC Kansas City ===
In the second collegiate draft for the National Women's Soccer League, FC Kansas City selected Kallman with their first pick, the fifth pick overall, following four of her teammates from the 2012 U-20 World Cup team: Crystal Dunn, Kealia Ohai, Julie Johnston, and Vanessa DiBernardo.

As most of Kallman's collegiate and U-20 international experience was spent in the central defense, she was largely expected to step into the hole in that position left by Lauren Sesselmann's departure for the Houston Dash through the 2014 NWSL Expansion Draft. However, through the first few games of the 2014 NWSL season, she featured as the left wing-back, providing width in the attack for FC Kansas City's possession-oriented style. Kallman adjusted to the role well, particularly against the high-powered attacks of the Portland Thorns and Seattle Reign during the playoffs, helping the Blues win the 2014 NWSL Championship.

=== Boston Breakers ===
On October 27, 2014, Kallman was traded to the Boston Breakers for Heather O'Reilly, along with Morgan Marlborough.

=== Washington Spirit ===
In November 2016, Kallman was traded to the Washington Spirit along with Kristie Mewis for Megan Oyster.

== International career ==
Kallman's first-ever national team call-up came in January 2011 after her freshman season at FSU when she was invited in with the U.S. U-20s.

Kallman became an important member of the U-20 US national team that won the FIFA U-20 World Cup in Japan in 2012. She started and played all 450 minutes of the qualifying games, leading the squad in minutes and served as team captain in the final pool play match against Panama.

In February 2014, Kallman was among six players recently drafted into the NWSL and five members of the U.S. team that won the 2012 FIFA U-20 Women's World Cup that were called up by Steve Swanson to represent the US in La Manga, Spain, for the 2014 Six Nations Tournament. The USA won the tournament, defeating the U-23 sides of Japan (1–0), Sweden (2–1), and Norway (2–1) as Kallman went the full 90 against Japan and Norway.

== Personal life ==
Kallman has been in a relationship with Eric Miller since 2009.

== Career statistics ==
Club	Season	League		
Club	Season	League	Apps	Goals
FC Kansas City	2014	NWSL	18	0
Boston Breakers	2015	NWSL	20	0
Boston Breakers	2016	NWSL	20	0
Washington Spirit	2017	NWSL	17	0
Career totals			75	0

== Honors ==
FC Kansas City

- NWSL Championship: 2014

== See also ==
- Florida State Seminoles women's soccer
- United States U-20 women's national soccer team
- United States U-23 women's national soccer team
- 2012 FIFA U-20 Women's World Cup squad
