= Dushawne Simpson =

American soccer coach

Dushawne Simpson is an American soccer coach, currently coaching with the NEFC. Simpson has been a part of six national championship teams with Oakwood, Aztecs, Breakers Reserves and a national championship with his U17G & U16 NEFC teams. Simpson has also led his club teams to 10 State Cup championships as well as his girls high school team Pingree to 4 NEPSAC Championships. Pingree has had 4 All Americans under his watch and he has helped develop over 30 professional players.

Before moving over to coaching, Simpson was a soccer player. Simpson played his youth soccer in Connecticut and played his high school soccer at Avon Old Farms School and then Avon High School. At Avon High School, Simpson helped lead his team to a #2 national high school soccer ranking in 1990 and was selected to the 1990 CT All-State team in Soccer, Basketball and Track.

Simpson continued at the collegiate level, playing at NCAA Division II powerhouse Southern Connecticut State University (SCSU) as a freshman and then moving on to Salem State College. Dushawne was an all-conference performer at Salem State College and as a freshman he was all-conference and Freshman of the Year for SCSU when he led the league in scoring.

Simpson followed up his college career by playing professionally for several teams, including the New Hampshire Phantoms, the Connecticut Wolves and the Boston Bulldogs. (soccer)
