= Stephanie Verdoia =

American soccer player

Personal information
- Full name: Stephanie Ann Verdoia
- Date of birth: January 2, 1993 (age 33)
- Place of birth: Salt Lake City, Utah, United States
- Height: 1.68 m (5 ft 6 in)
- Position: Midfielder

College career
| Years | Team | Apps | (Gls) |
| 2011–2014 | Seattle Redhawks | | |

Senior career*
| Years | Team | Apps | (Gls) |
| 2015–2016 | Boston Breakers | 18 | (0) |
| 2017 | Vålerenga | 23 | (2) |

International career
| 2015 | United States U23 | 2 | (0) |
- * Club domestic league appearances and goals as of July 20, 2018

Stephanie Ann Verdoia (born January 2, 1993) is an American soccer player who last played for Vålerenga in the Toppserien.

== Club career ==
After playing four years at Seattle University, Verdoia was drafted by the Boston Breakers with the 29th pick in the 2015 NWSL College Draft. She signed with the Breakers for the 2015 Season and made eight appearances for the club. In 2016, she made 10 appearances. She was waived by the Breakers on January 27, 2017.

Verdoia signed with Vålerenga in the Toppserien for the 2017 season.

She attended training camp with the Seattle Reign in 2018, but she did not make the final roster.

== International career ==
Verdoia received a call-up for the United States U-23 team for the Six Nations Tournament in 2015. This was her debut in a United States jersey.
