= Mollie Pathman =

American soccer player

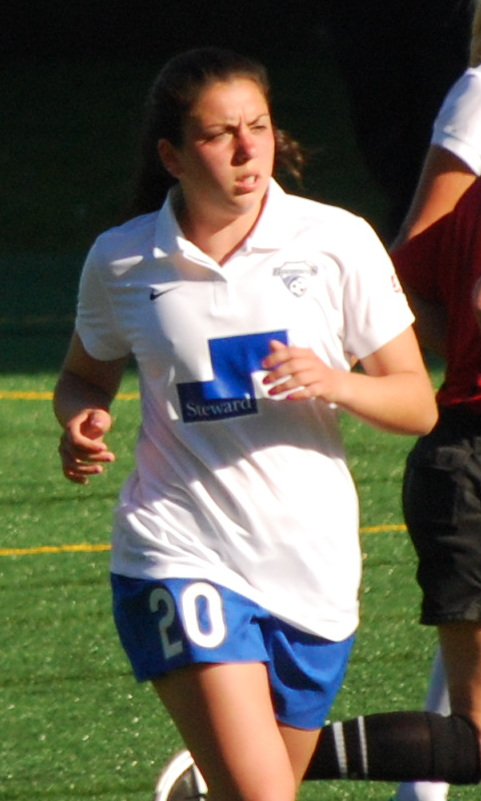
- Pathman in 2014

Personal information
- Full name: Mollie Elizabeth Pathman
- Date of birth: July 1, 1992 (age 34)
- Place of birth: Chapel Hill, North Carolina, United States
- Height: 5 ft 4 in (1.63 m)
- Positions: Forward; midfielder

College career
Years	Team	Apps	(Gls)
2010–2013	Duke Blue Devils		

Senior career*
Years	Team	Apps	(Gls)
2014–2016	Boston Breakers	54	(1)

International career
2010–2012	United States U20	23	(0)
- * Club domestic league appearances and goals as of September 13, 2016

Mollie Elizabeth Pathman (born July 1, 1992) is a retired American soccer forward and midfielder who played for Boston Breakers in the National Women's Soccer League.

== Early life ==
Born in Chapel Hill, North Carolina to parents Don and Beth Pathman, Mollie was raised with her brother Josh in Durham. She attended Durham Academy and graduated as the all-time leading scorer with 130 goals and 65 assists in the history of the team. Pathman received Parade All-American honors in 2009 and 2010 and was named the 2010 Gatorade National High School Player of the Year.

=== Duke University ===
Pathman attended Duke University, where she played for the Blue Devils from 2010 – 2013.

== Club career ==
=== Boston Breakers ===
Pathman was selected by the Boston Breakers as the 23rd overall pick of the 2014 NWSL College Draft. She signed with the team in April of the same year.

On July 15, 2016, Pathman announced her retirement from professional soccer to pursue a career in the medical field.

== International career ==
Pathman has represented the United States at various youth levels. She played on the United States women's national under-20 soccer team for both the 2010 and 2012 FIFA U-20 Women's World Cup. The US team won the latter tournament.

== Personal life ==
Pathman resides in Durham, North Carolina with her dog, Theodore, and practices as a physical therapist.
