= Jami Kranich =

Personal information
- Full name: Jami-Ann Kranich
- Date of birth: May 27, 1992 (age 34)
- Place of birth: New Haven, Connecticut, U.S.
- Height: 5 ft 10 in (1.78 m)
- Position: Goalkeeper

Team information
- Current team: Boston College Eagles

Youth career
- Connecticut Football Club

College career
Years	Team	Apps	(Gls)
2010–2013	Villanova Wildcats		

Senior career*
Years	Team	Apps	(Gls)
2014–2016	Boston Breakers	17	(0)

International career
2012	United States U20		
2013	United States U23		

Managerial career
- 2014–2015: Quinnipiac Bobcats (asst.)
- 2015–2016: BB&N Knights (asst.)
- 2017–2018: Princeton Tigers (asst.)
- 2019–: Boston College Eagles (asst.)
- * Club domestic league appearances and goals as of April 28, 2021

Jami-Ann Kranich (/ˈdʒeɪmi ˈkrænɪtʃ/ JAY-mee KRAN-itch; born May 27, 1992) is an American soccer coach and former player from Hamden, Connecticut, who is currently an assistant coach with the Boston College Eagles women's soccer team.

== Early life ==
Born on May 27, 1992, in New Haven, Connecticut, to James and Nancy Kranich, she played high school soccer at Hamden High School, where she started three seasons, and played club soccer for Connecticut Football Club.

== Playing career ==
=== College ===
Kranich attended Villanova University, where she played as a goalkeeper for the Wildcats. Kranich had 12 shutouts in 64 appearances for the Wildcats.

=== International ===
Kranich has appeared with the United States national U-20 soccer team, and was a member of the 2012 championship team at the FIFA U-20 Women's World Cup.

=== Club ===
==== Boston Breakers, 2014–2016 ====
Kranich was selected in the fourth round of the 2014 National Women's Soccer League college entry draft by the Boston Breakers.

Jami recorded her first professional shutout against the Portland Thorns May 16, 2015. The Breakers waived Kranich on April 5, 2016. Boston re-signed her in May 2016 to replace keeper Abby Smith, who tore her ACL early in the season.

== Awards and honors ==
=== College ===
Big East Goalkeeper of the Week (Oct. 22, 2012), Villanova.

Third Team All-Big East Team: 2012, Villanova.

=== Country ===
2012 FIFA U-20 Women's World Cup Champion, U.S. Women's U-20 National Team.
