= Julie King =

American soccer player

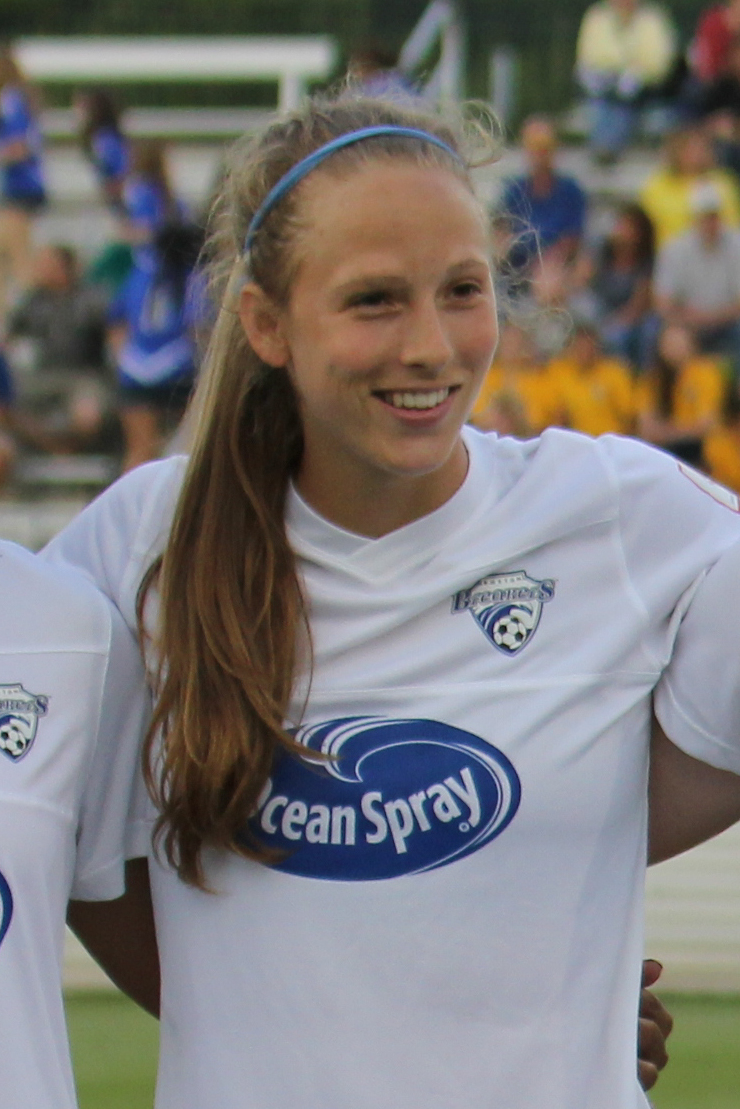
- King with Boston Breakers in 2013

Personal information
- Full name: Julie O'Toole King
- Date of birth: October 21, 1989 (age 37)
- Place of birth: St. Louis, Missouri, United States
- Height: 5 ft 9 in (1.75 m)
- Position: Defender

College career
Years	Team	Apps	(Gls)
2008–2011	Auburn Tigers		

Senior career*
Years	Team	Apps	(Gls)
2012	Boston Breakers (WPSLE)	14	(?)
2013–2017	Boston Breakers	95	(6)
2018–2019	North Carolina Courage	0	(0)
2019–2020	Orlando Pride	2	(0)
- * Club domestic league appearances and goals as of October 29, 2020

Julie O'Toole King (born October 21, 1989) is an American soccer player who plays as a defender. She played college soccer at Auburn University and professionally for the Boston Breakers, North Carolina Courage and Orlando Pride.

== Early life and education ==
King's parents are Kevin and Julie; her siblings are model RJ King, model and former The Amazing Race 21 contestant Caitlin King, and reality TV personality Meghan King Edmonds. King's older sister Caitlin played soccer with her at Auburn for two seasons.

King attended and played for Nerinx Hall High School in Webster Groves, Missouri, where she was an honor roll student. She was a wing-midfielder for St. Louis Scott Gallagher Club Soccer and helped her club team advance to the Region II regional Finals five out of the six years they competed, winning in 2003 and 2005, including winning the National Championship in 2005. King was a 2005 All-Metro honorable mention, 2006 Second Team All-Metro, 2007 All-Midwest honorable mention, a 2007 First Team All-Metro, First Team All-Conference and First Team All-State, 2007 All-Midwest honorable mention, 2008 First Team All-State, All-Metro and All-Conference. She was a second team All-Conference selection in basketball in 2008 and 2007.

=== Auburn University ===
King attended and played for Auburn University, where she majored in interdisciplinary studies. Following her four years of soccer with the Auburn Tigers, King also played a single season of basketball with the school.

==== Auburn statistics ====
Legend
GP	Games played	GS	Games started	MPG	Minutes per game
FG%	Field goal percentage	3P%	3-point field goal percentage	FT%	Free throw percentage
RPG	Rebounds per game	APG	Assists per game	SPG	Steals per game
BPG	Blocks per game	PPG	Points per game	**Bold**	Career high

Year	Team	GP	Points	FG%	3P%	FT%	RPG	APG	SPG	BPG	PPG
2012–13	Auburn	30	34	26.0%	0.0%	66.7%	1.8	1.0	0.6	0.1	1.1

== Club career ==
=== Boston Breakers 2012–2017 ===
Following the folding of the Women's Professional Soccer (WPS) league, King signed on to play with the Boston Breakers in the Women's Premier Soccer League Elite (WPSL Elite), where she played 14 times for the Breakers, starting nine times. Prior to the start of the inaugural 2013 National Women's Soccer League season, King again signed with the Boston Breakers as a discovery player in March 2013. In 2013, King started all 21 games she appeared in and logged 1,862 minutes.

In 2014, King started all 17 games she appeared in and logged 1,530 minutes, third highest on the team, despite missing 6 games due to injury. She tallied one goal and one assist. Her goal, the first of her professional career, came on April 27, 2014, in a 3–2 win at home over Sky Blue FC. She also registered an assist in the match.

=== North Carolina Courage 2018–2019 ===
King was selected by the North Carolina Courage as the number 9 draft pick in the Breakers Dispersal Draft on January 30, 2018. King would not play for the Courage in 2018 or 2019 as she was recovering from two ankle operations, and she was released by the Courage on July 18, 2019, without making an appearance for the team.

=== Orlando Pride, 2019–2020 ===
On August 8, 2019, King was signed by the Orlando Pride. She made her debut for the team two days later at home to Houston Dash. Orlando lost 1–0 with King receiving a red card in the 61st minute. She was waived at the end of the 2020 season and made available on the re-entry wire but was not picked up.
