= Morgan Marlborough =

American soccer player (born 1990)

Personal information
- Full name: Morgan Brooke Marlborough
- Date of birth: December 3, 1990 (age 35)
- Place of birth: Lee's Summit, Missouri, United States
- Height: 1.83 m (6 ft 0 in)
- Position: Forward

College career
Years	Team	Apps	(Gls)
2009–2011	Nebraska Cornhuskers	58	(59)
2012–2013	Santa Clara Broncos	22	(15)

Senior career*
Years	Team	Apps	(Gls)
2014	FC Kansas City	9	(2)
2014	→ Glasgow City F.C. (loan)	4	(1)
2015–2016	Boston Breakers	17	(3)

International career
2010	United States U20		
2012–2013	United States U23		
- * Club domestic league appearances and goals as of May 17, 2015

Morgan Brooke Marlborough (born December 3, 1990) is an American soccer player. She previously played for the Boston Breakers and FC Kansas City of the National Women's Soccer League (NWSL) and Glasgow City F.C. in the Scottish Women's Premier League.

== Career ==
Marlborough played for the Cornhuskers at the University of Nebraska–Lincoln and then for the Santa Clara Broncos.

She was selected by FC Kansas City with the 12th pick in the 2014 NWSL College Draft. Marlborough went on loan to Glasgow City F.C. on September 8, 2014.

She was traded to the Boston Breakers by FC Kansas City on October 27, 2014.

On May 3, 2016, she was waived by the Breakers.

== International career ==
Marlborough was invited to the U.S. U-17 National Team Camp in 2007. In 2010, she played for the U.S. U-20 Women's National Team in the CONCACAF World Cup qualifiers.

She was a member of the U-23 U.S. Women's National Team. At the 2012 Four Nations Tournament she scored one goal and tallied one to assist in 5–0 win over Norway that gave the U.S. U-23s the tournament championship. In March 2013, she played with the U.S. U-23s at the Four Nations Tournament in La Manga, Spain where she scored two goals in a 6–0 win over Sweden.

== Honors ==
=== FC Kansas City ===
Winner

- National Women's Soccer League: 2014

=== Glasgow City F.C. ===
Winner

- Scottish Women's Premier League: 2014
- Scottish Women's Cup: 2014
