= Rachel Wood (soccer) =

American soccer player

Personal information
- Full name: Rachel Marie Wood
- Date of birth: May 10, 1990 (age 36)
- Place of birth: Laguna Niguel, California, United States
- Height: 1.83 m (6 ft 0 in)
- Position: Midfielder

College career
Years	Team	Apps	(Gls)
2008–2011	North Carolina Tar Heels		
2012	UC Irvine Anteaters		

Senior career*
Years	Team	Apps	(Gls)
2013	HK/Víkingur	9	(2)
2014–2016	Boston Breakers	24	(1)

International career
2009	United States U20		
- * Club domestic league appearances and goals

Rachel Marie Wood (born May 10, 1990) is an American former soccer player. She played as a midfielder for Boston Breakers.

== Career ==
Wood graduated from Aliso Niguel High School in 2007. She played for Icelandic club HK/Víkingur before moving to Boston Breakers on July 11, 2014.

== Personal life ==
She currently is residing in the South End of Boston.

== Honors ==
North Carolina Tar Heels

- NCAA Division I women's soccer tournament: 2008
