= List of Boston Breakers players =

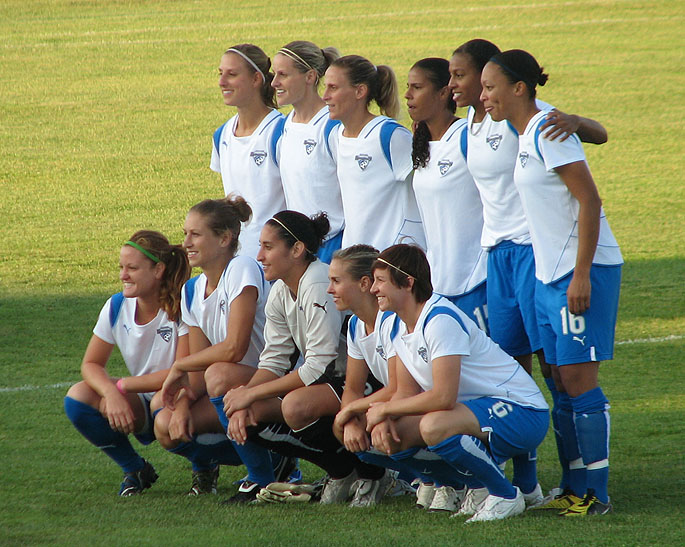
A starting lineup of players for the Boston Breakers of Women's Professional Soccer in 2009

The Boston Breakers was an American professional women's soccer club which played in the Women's Professional Soccer (WPS) league from its inaugural season in 2009 to the league's final season in 2011, in the Women's Premier Soccer League Elite during the competition's only season in 2012, and in the National Women's Soccer League (NWSL) from its inaugural season in 2013 to the club's final season in 2017. It was the successor to the Boston Breakers of the Women's United Soccer Association, which played from 2000 to 2003. All WPS and NWSL Breakers players who have appeared for the team in an official competition or have been contracted to play for the team are listed below.

== Key ==
- The list is ordered first by total number of appearances, and then if necessary in alphabetical order.
- Statistics are correct as of the end of the 2017 NWSL season.

Positions key
GK	Goalkeeper
DF	Defender
MF	Midfielder
FW	Forward

Nationality
Unless otherwise noted, the nationality of a player is determined by the country they most recently represented in international play, or if said player has not played international football then by their country of birth.
Position
Playing positions are listed according to the player's roster designation as of the list's most recent update.
Breakers career
Breakers career is defined as the first and last calendar years in which the player was rostered for the club in any of the competitions listed below.
Games played (GP), Games started (GS), Goals (G), Assists (A)
This list counts appearances, goals, and assists only in official WPS and NWSL competitions.

== Players ==
Breakers players in Women's Professional Soccer
Name	Nat.	Pos.	Breakers career	GP	GS	G	A
Alex Scott	(England) ENG	DF	2009–2011	53	52	1	3
Amy LePeilbet	(United States) USA	DF	2009–2011	51	51	0	1
Kelly Smith	(England) ENG	FW	2009–2011	46	43	18	11
Kristine Lilly	(United States) USA	MF	2009–2010	43	42	6	6
Kasey Moore	(United States) USA	DF	2009–2011	36	25	3	1
Alyssa Naeher	(United States) USA	GK	2010–2011	34	0	0	0
Leslie Osborne	(United States) USA	MF	2010–2011	34	34	0	0
Stephanie Cox	(United States) USA	DF	2010–2011	34	34	1	3
Lauren Holiday	(United States) USA	FW	2010–2011	32	30	8	2
Taryn Hemmings	(United States) USA	FW	2010–2011	29	14	0	0
Fabiana	(Brazil) BRA	FW	2009–2010	28	21	1	0
Ifeoma Dieke	(Scotland) SCO	DF	2010–2011	27	25	1	0
Jordan Angeli	(United States) USA	DF	2010–2011	22	17	8	3
Lindsay Tarpley	(United States) USA	FW	2010	22	18	4	3
Liz Bogus	(United States) USA	MF	2010–2011	22	12	3	1
Laura del Río	(Spain) ESP	FW	2010	21	7	1	1
Angela Hucles	(United States) USA	MF	2009	19	19	2	1
Heather Mitts	(United States) USA	DF	2009	19	19	0	1
Keelin Winters	(United States) USA	MF	2011	18	17	3	2
Amy Rodriguez	(United States) USA	FW	2009	17	11	1	0
Kelly Schmedes	(United States) USA	FW	2009	17	10	1	1
Christine Latham	(Canada) CAN	FW	2009	16	8	2	1
Nikki Marshall	(United States) USA	DF	2011	14	7	0	0
Katie Schoepfer	(United States) USA	FW	2011	13	9	2	2
Kelley O'Hara	(United States) USA	FW	2011	13	11	4	1
Meghan Klingenberg	(United States) USA	DF	2011	12	10	1	2
Allison Lipsher	(United States) USA	GK	2009	11	10	0	0
Candace Chapman	(Canada) CAN	DF	2009	11	8	0	0
Jennifer Nobis	(United States) USA	FW	2009	11	7	2	0
Maggie Tomecka	(United States) USA	MF	2009	11	6	0	0
Nancy Augustyniak Goffi	(United States) USA	DF	2009	11	7	0	0
Kristin Luckenbill	(United States) USA	GK	2009	10	10	0	0
Niki Cross	(United States) USA	DF	2010–2011	10	2	0	0
Rachel Van Hollebeke	(United States) USA	DF	2011	10	10	1	0
Stacy Bishop	(United States) USA	MF	2009	10	6	0	2
Ashley Phillips	(United States) USA	GK	2009–2010	9	0	0	0
Chioma Igwe	(United States) USA	MF	2010	9	7	0	0
Elli Reed	(United States) USA	MF	2011	9	5	0	0
Sue Weber	(United States) USA	DF	2009	9	8	0	0
Claire Zimmeck	(United States) USA	FW	2010–2011	8	0	0	1
Tiffany Weimer	(United States) USA	FW	2010	8	2	0	0
Aya Sameshima	(Japan) JPN	DF	2011	5	4	0	0
Leah Blayney	(Australia) AUS	MF	2011	5	2	0	1
Mary-Frances Monroe	(United States) USA	MF	2009	5	4	0	1
Abby Crumpton	(United States) USA	FW	2009	4	1	0	0
Kiersten Dallstream	(United States) USA	FW	2011	4	2	0	0
Sophia Mundy	(United States) USA	MF	2009	3	2	0	0
Analisa Marquez	(United States) USA	FW	2010	1	0	0	0
Erika Sutton	(United States) USA	DF	2009	1	1	0	0
Megan Mischler	(United States) USA	MF	2011	1	0	0	0
Ariel Harris	(United States) USA	DF	2009	0	0	0	0

Breakers players in the Women's Premier Soccer League Elite
Name	Nat.	Pos.	Breakers career	GP	GS	G	A
Courtney Jones	(United States) USA	FW	2012	15	12	2	5
Leslie Osborne	(United States) USA	MF	2012	15	14	0	3
Bianca D'Agostino	(United States) USA	MF	2012	14	12	1	0
Kyah Simon	(Australia) AUS	FW	2012	14	12	12	2
Katie Schoepfer	(United States) USA	FW	2012	14	13	7	4
Taryn Hemmings	(United States) USA	DF	2012	14	14	0	0
Cat Whitehill	(United States) USA	DF	2012	13	12	0	0
Jess Luscinski	(United States) USA	MF	2012	13	8	1	1
Julie King	(United States) USA	DF	2012	13	8	0	1
Alice Binns	(United States) USA	GK	2012	13	0	0	0
Elli Reed	(United States) USA	DF	2012	12	10	1	0
Amanda DaCosta	(Portugal) POR	MF	2012	9	8	1	1
Emma Thomson	(England) ENG	DF	2012	9	2	0	0
Tameka Butt	(Australia) AUS	MF	2012	8	6	2	0
Katherine Donnelly	(United States) USA	DF	2012	7	0	0	1
Melissa Henderson	(United States) USA	FW	2012	5	5	1	0
Kate Incerto	(United States) USA	MF	2012	4	3	0	0
Veronica Napoli	(Italy) ITA	FW	2012	4	1	1	1
Mary-Frances Monroe	(United States) USA	MF	2012	2	1	0	0
Alejandra Velasco	(Colombia) COL	GK	2012	2	0	0	0
Furtuna Velaj	(Albania) ALB	FW	2012	2	0	0	0
Heather O'Reilly	(United States) USA	MF	2012	2	0	0	2
Kristi Lefebvre	(United States) USA	DF	2012	1	0	0	0
Lindsay Massengale	(United States) USA	DF	2012	1	0	0	0

Breakers players in the National Women's Soccer League
Name	Nat.	Pos.	Breakers career	GP	GS	G	A
Julie King	(United States) USA	DF	2013–2017	95	94	6	3
Katie Schoepfer	(United States) USA	FW	2013–2016	68	51	7	3
Mollie Pathman	(United States) USA	FW	2014–2016	54	50	1	1
Kristie Mewis	(United States) USA	DF	2014–2016	51	48	10	5
Cat Whitehill	(United States) USA	DF	2013–2015	47	47	1	3
Maddy Evans	(United States) USA	DF	2013–2015	46	23	2	3
Alyssa Naeher	(United States) USA	GK	2013–2015	45	44	0	0
Angela Salem	(United States) USA	MF	2016–2017	43	43	1	0
Heather O'Reilly	(United States) USA	FW	2013–2014	42	41	14	11
Kyah Simon	(Australia) AUS	FW	2013–2016	41	32	6	4
Lianne Sanderson	(England) ENG	FW	2013–2014	41	38	10	10
Kassey Kallman	(United States) USA	DF	2015–2016	40	40	0	0
Joanna Lohman	(United States) USA	DF	2013–2014	39	35	3	0
Adriana Leon	(Canada) CAN	MF	2013–2017	30	22	7	6
Natasha Dowie	(England) ENG	FW	2016–2017	30	25	10	2
Brooke Elby	(United States) USA	DF	2016–2017	26	21	0	0
Christen Westphal	(United States) USA	DF	2016–2017	26	20	1	1
Rachel Wood	(United States) USA	DF	2014–2016	24	17	1	1
Jazmyne Avant	(United States) USA	DF	2013–2014	23	20	0	1
Megan Oyster	(United States) USA	DF	2017	23	23	0	0
Nkem Ezurike	(Canada) CAN	FW	2014–2015	23	9	3	1
Margaret Purce	(United States) USA	DF	2017	22	13	1	2
Rosie White	(New Zealand) NZL	MF	2017	22	21	4	1
Abby Smith	(United States) USA	GK	2016–2017	21	21	0	0
Kia McNeill	(United States) USA	DF	2013	21	21	0	0
Amy Barczuk	(United States) USA	DF	2015	20	18	0	0
Mariah Bullock	(Samoa) SAM	DF	2013	20	16	3	1
Allysha Chapman	(Canada) CAN	DF	2017	19	19	0	0
Stephanie McCaffrey	(United States) USA	FW	2015–2016	19	17	3	3
Sydney Leroux	(United States) USA	FW	2013	19	19	11	2
Courtney Jones	(United States) USA	DF	2014	18	13	3	1
Ifeoma Onumonu	(Nigeria) NGA	FW	2017	18	3	0	1
Louise Schillgard	(Sweden) SWE	MF	2016	18	16	1	2
Morgan Andrews	(United States) USA	MF	2017	18	10	0	0
Stephanie Verdoia	(United States) USA	MF	2015–2016	18	6	0	0
Jami Kranich	(United States) USA	GK	2015–2016	17	17	0	0
Jazmine Reeves	(United States) USA	FW	2014	17	13	7	1
Morgan Marlborough	(United States) USA	FW	2015–2016	17	8	3	0
Tiffany Weimer	(United States) USA	MF	2017	17	11	0	1
Bianca D'Agostino	(United States) USA	MF	2014	16	6	0	0
Brittany Ratcliffe	(United States) USA	FW	2016	15	5	0	0
Nikki Washington	(United States) USA	FW	2014	15	10	1	0
Lauren Lazo	(United States) USA	DF	2015	14	11	1	0
Rhian Wilkinson	(Canada) CAN	DF	2013	14	11	2	1
Whitney Engen	(United States) USA	DF	2016	14	14	1	1
Rafinha	(Brazil) BRA	MF	2015	13	8	0	1
Amanda Frisbie	(United States) USA	DF	2017	12	9	0	1
Katie Stengel	(United States) USA	FW	2017	12	7	0	1
Suzane Pires	(Portugal) POR	MF	2015	12	6	0	1
Amanda DaCosta	(Portugal) POR	MF	2017	11	4	1	0
Ashley Phillips	(United States) USA	GK	2013	11	11	0	0
Bianca Sierra	(Mexico) MEX	DF	2014	11	9	0	1
Eunice Beckmann	(Germany) GER	FW	2016	11	8	0	1
Bia	(Brazil) BRA	MF	2015	10	3	0	0
Chelsea Stewart	(Canada) CAN	MF	2014	10	7	0	0
Jo Dragotta	(United States) USA	DF	2013	10	6	0	0
Libby Stout	(United States) USA	GK	2016–2017	10	9	0	0
Rose Lavelle	(United States) USA	MF	2017	10	8	2	1
Ashley Grove	(United States) USA	MF	2014	9	7	0	0
McCall Zerboni	(United States) USA	MF	2016	8	8	0	0
Emilie Haavi	(Norway) NOR	FW	2017	7	5	0	0
Kylie Strom	(United States) USA	DF	2016–2017	7	3	0	0
Elise Krieghoff	(United States) USA	FW	2016	6	0	1	0
Lisa De Vanna	(Australia) AUS	FW	2014	6	5	0	1
Carmelina Moscato	(Canada) CAN	DF	2013	5	1	0	0
Sammy Jo Prudhomme	(United States) USA	GK	2017	5	5	0	0
Kate Howarth	(United States) USA	FW	2013	4	0	0	0
Lisa-Marie Woods	(Norway) NOR	MF	2013	4	1	0	0
Cecilia Santiago	(Mexico) MEX	GK	2013	3	3	0	0
Ghoutia Karchouni	(France) FRA	MF	2016	3	1	0	0
Kaylyn Kyle	(Canada) CAN	MF	2014	2	2	0	0
Chanel Johnson	(United States) USA	MF	2015	1	0	0	0
Elizabeth Guess	(United States) USA	FW	2013	1	0	0	1
Hayley Dowd	(United States) USA	FW	2017	1	0	0	0
Ketlen Wiggers	(Brazil) BRA	FW	2015	1	1	0	0
Kim DeCesare	(United States) USA	FW	2014	1	0	0	0
Melinda Mercado	(United States) USA	DF	2013	1	1	0	0
Riley Houle	(United States) USA	MF	2015	1	0	0	0
Anisa Guajardo	(Mexico) MEX	FW	2013	0	0	0	0
Colleen Boyd	(United States) USA	GK	2013	0	0	0	0
Jamie Gillis	(United States) USA	GK	2017	0	0	0	0
Jen LaPonte	(United States) USA	DF	2013	0	0	0	0
Kate Russell	(United States) USA	MF	2013	0	0	0	0
Monique Lamotte	(United States) USA	FW	2013	0	0	0	0

Combined statistics for Breakers players who played in multiple leagues
Name	Nat.	Pos.	Breakers career	GP	GS	G	A
Julie King	(United States) USA	DF	2012–2017	108	102	6	4
Katie Schoepfer	(United States) USA	FW	2011–2016	95	73	16	9
Alyssa Naeher	(United States) USA	GK	2010–2011, 2013–2015	79	44	0	0
Cat Whitehill	(United States) USA	DF	2012–2015	60	59	1	3
Kyah Simon	(Australia) AUS	FW	2012–2016	55	44	18	6
Leslie Osborne	(United States) USA	MF	2010–2012	49	48	0	3
Heather O'Reilly	(United States) USA	MF	2012–2014	44	41	14	13
Taryn Hemmings	(United States) USA	FW	2010–2012	43	28	0	0
Courtney Jones	(United States) USA	FW	2012, 2014	33	25	5	6
Bianca D'Agostino	(United States) USA	MF	2012, 2014	30	18	1	0
Tiffany Weimer	(United States) USA	MF	2010, 2017	25	13	0	1
Elli Reed	(United States) USA	MF	2011–2012	21	15	1	0
Amanda DaCosta	(Portugal) POR	MF	2012, 2017	20	12	2	1
Ashley Phillips	(United States) USA	GK	2009–2010, 2013	20	11	0	0
Mary-Frances Monroe	(United States) USA	MF	2009, 2012	7	5	0	1

== Records and milestones ==
- First international signing: Canadian Christine Latham
- Players who also played for the WUSA Breakers:
  - Angela Hucles (2001–2003, WPS 2009)
  - Kristine Lilly (2001–2003, WPS 2009–2010)
  - Mary-Frances Monroe (2003, WPS 2009, WPSLE 2012)
  - Lindsay Massengale (2002–2003, WPSLE 2012)
