= 2014 Boston Breakers season =

Boston Breakers
2014 season
- Owner: Boston Women's Soccer, LLC
- Head coach: Tom Durkin
- Stadium: Harvard Stadium; Boston, MA
- NWSL: 8th
- Highest home attendance: 4,191 vs. Portland (August 10, 2014)
- Lowest home attendance: 1,263 vs. Sky Blue FC (April 27, 2014)
- Average home league attendance: 2,437
Home colors	Away colors

The 2014 Boston Breakers season, is the club's ninth overall year of existence, fifth consecutive year, and second year as a member of the National Women's Soccer League.

== Club ==
=== Kits ===
Type	Shirt	Shorts	Socks	Info
Primary				
Secondary				

=== Executive staff ===
Ownership Group	Boston Women's Soccer, LLC
Managing Partner	Michael Stoller
General Manager	Lee Billiard
Ground (capacity and dimensions)	Harvard Stadium (30,323 / Unknown)

Updated to match played March 7, 2013

=== Coaching staff ===
Position	Staff
Head Coach	Tom Durkin
Assistant Coach	Cat Whitehill
Goalkeeper Coach	Ashley Phillips

Last updated: April 13, 2014
Source: http://www.bostonbreakerssoccer.com/ABOUT/COACHING/index_E.html

=== Roster ===
Note: Flags indicate national team as defined under FIFA eligibility rules; some limited exceptions apply. Players may hold more than one non-FIFA nationality.

No.	Pos.	Nation	Player
1	GK	USA	Alyssa Naeher
2	GK	USA	Jami Kranich
3	FW	USA	Courtney Jones
4	DF	USA	Cat Whitehill
5	DF	USA	Jazmyne Avant
7	DF	CAN	Jazmine Reeves
8	DF	USA	Julie King
9	MF	USA	Heather O'Reilly
10	FW	ENG	Lianne Sanderson
11	MF	USA	Joanna Lohman
12	FW	USA	Katie Schoepfer

No.	Pos.	Nation	Player
14	FW	AUS	Lisa De Vanna
15	FW	USA	Bianca D'Agostino
17	DF	USA	Chelsea Stewart
18	MF	USA	Maddy Evans
19	MF	USA	Kristie Mewis
20	FW	USA	Mollie Pathman
21	FW	USA	Ashley Grove
22	FW	CAN	Nkem Ezurike
23	MF	CAN	Kaylyn Kyle

== Competitions ==
=== Key ===
Win Tie Loss

=== Preseason ===
March 24, 2014 1	Northeastern Huskies	0–6	Boston Breakers	Brookline, Massachusetts
		Report	De Vanna 1'; Schoepfer, Pathman; Evans,	Stadium: Parsons Field

March 29, 2014 2	Boston College Eagles	0–1	Boston Breakers	Newton, Massachusetts
		Report	Whitehill 88' (pen.)	Stadium: Newton Soccer Complex

April 3, 2014 3	Harvard Crimson	1–4	Boston Breakers	Boston, Massachusetts
	Casscells-Hamby 14'	Report	Pathman 45'; Whitehill 47'; Lohman 57'; Schoepfer 60'	Stadium: Soldiers Field Soccer Stadium

April 5, 2014 4	Connecticut Huskies	0–6	Boston Breakers	Taunton, Massachusetts
		Report	Evans 5', 20', 55'; Schoepfer 7'; Stewart,	Stadium: ForeKicks

=== Regular season ===
April 13, 2014 1	Seattle Reign	3–0	Boston Breakers	Seattle, Washington
16:00 (PDT)	Little 49' (pen.), 54'; Winters (yellow card) 59'; Rapinoe (yellow card) 82', (goal) 88'	Report	Avant (yellow card) 43'; Jones (yellow card) 56'	Stadium: Memorial Stadium; Attendance: 3,021; Referee: Katja Koroleva

April 20, 2014 2	Boston Breakers	2–3	Houston Dash	Boston, Massachusetts
17:30 (PDT)	O'Reilly 1' (yellow card) 85'; Naeher (yellow card) 58'; Lohman 70'; Jones (yellow card) 79'	Summary	Masar 50'; Noyola 81' 85' (pen.)	Stadium: Harvard Stadium; Attendance: 2,018; Referee: (United States) Josh Wilkens

April 27, 2014 3	Boston Breakers	3–2	Sky Blue FC	Boston, Massachusetts
18:00 (PDT)	King 14'; Ashley Grove (yellow card) 40'; Sanderson 42' 60'	Summary	Ocampo 30'; Nick 90+3'	Stadium: Harvard Stadium; Attendance: 1,263; Referee: (United States) Juliana Duncan

May 3, 2014 4	Sky Blue FC	1–0	Boston Breakers	Piscataway, New Jersey
18:00 (PDT)	Ocampo 14'	Summary	De Vanna (red card) 89'	Stadium: Yurcak Field; Attendance: 1,294; Referee: (United States) Mark Allatin

May 15, 2014 5	Boston Breakers	1–3	Chicago Red Stars	Boston, Massachusetts
18:00 (PDT)	Jones 19' (yellow card) 56'; Lohman (yellow card) 42'	Summary	Chalupny 44'; Leon (yellow card) 47'; Wenino 52'; Hoy 67'; Mautz (yellow card) 77'	Stadium: Harvard Stadium; Attendance: 1,696; Referee: (United States) Mark Allatin

May 18, 2014 6	Boston Breakers	1–4	Chicago Red Stars	Boston, Massachusetts
17:30 (PDT)	O'Reilly 35' (pen.)	Summary	Wenino 23'; Hoy 50'; Chalupny 57'; Bywaters 85'	Stadium: Harvard Stadium; Attendance: 2,123; Referee: (United States) Kristen Salazar

May 25, 2014 7	Boston Breakers	0–2	FC Kansas City	Boston, Massachusetts
18:00 (PDT)		Summary	Phillips 62'; Rodriguez 82'	Stadium: Harvard Stadium; Attendance: 2,622; Referee: (United States) Katja Koroleva

May 28, 2014 8	Boston Breakers	4–1	Portland Thorns FC	Boston, Massachusetts
18:30 (PDT)	Nkem Ezurike 2'; Jazmine Reeves 25' 45' 59'; Jones (yellow card) 38'; Whitehill (yellow card) 64'; D'Agostino (yellow card) 73'	Summary	Tarr (red card) 42'; Shim (yellow card) 58'; Sinclair 62'	Stadium: Harvard Stadium; Attendance: 1,556; Referee: (United States) Boris Senic

June 1, 2014 9	Boston Breakers	2–3	Washington Spirit	Boston, Massachusetts
17:30 (PDT)	Sanderson 29' 37'	Summary	Nairn 33'; Taylor 49' 74'	Stadium: Harvard Stadium; Attendance: 2,876; Referee: (United States) Karen Abt

June 7, 2014 10	FC Kansas City	2–0	Boston Breakers	Kansas City, Missouri
19:00 (PDT)	Holiday 13' (pen.) 35' (pen.)	Summary		Stadium: Durwood Soccer Stadium; Attendance: 1,457; Referee: (United States) Greg Dopka

June 11, 2014 11	Boston Breakers	2–0	Washington Spirit	Boston, Massachusetts
18:00 (PDT)	Schoepfer 42'; Jones 43'	Summary	Adams (yellow card) 60'	Stadium: Harvard Stadium; Attendance: 1,429; Referee: (United States) Timon Berry

June 19, 2014 12	Boston Breakers	0–2	Seattle Reign FC	Boston, Massachusetts
18:00 (PDT)		Summary	Goebel 4'; Winters 25'	Stadium: Harvard Stadium; Attendance: 2,714; Referee: (United States) David Mon

June 22, 2014 13	Sky Blue FC	1–1	Boston Breakers	Piscataway, New Jersey
12:00 (PDT)	O'Hara 2'; Levin (yellow card) 48' schmidt (yellow card) 51'; Nikki Stanton (yellow card) 65'	Summary	Jazmine Reeves 31'; Evans (yellow card) 85'	Stadium: Yurcak Field; Attendance: 1,212; Referee: (United States) Greg Dopka

June 27, 2014 14	Western New York Flash	2–1	Boston Breakers	Rochester, New York
18:30 (PDT)	Lloyd 59' 83'	Summary	Nkem Ezurike 71'	Stadium: Sahlen's Stadium

July 2, 2014 15	Washington Spirit	3–3	Boston Breakers	Washington, D.C.
18:00 (PDT)	Taylor 28' 56'; De Vanna (yellow card) 30'; Kreiger (yellow card) 87'; Matheson 90+1' (pen.)	Report	O'Reilly 4' (pen.) 7' (pen.) (yellow card) 19'; Jazmine Reeves 44'; Lohman (yellow card) 45+1'; Evans (red card) 70'; Sierra (yellow card) 90'	Stadium: Maryland SoccerPlex; Attendance: 2,673; Referee: (United States) Dimitar Chavdarov

July 6, 2014 16	Seattle Reign FC	3–2	Boston Breakers	Seattle, Washington
21:00 (PDT)	Kawasumi 55' 83'; Little 76'	Report	Jones 19'; Schoepfer 78' (yellow card) 90+1'	Stadium: Memorial Stadium (Seattle); Attendance: 3,705; Referee: (United States) Mark Allatin

July 11, 2014 17	Houston Dash	2–1	Boston Breakers	Houston, Texas
20:00 (PDT)	Ohai 56' 60'; Edwards (yellow card) 73'	Summary	Schoepfer 5'; Jones (yellow card) 90+3'	Stadium: BBVA Compass Stadium; Attendance: 4,063; Referee: (United States) Bernhard Hosu

July 20, 2014 18	Portland Thorns FC	6–3	Boston Breakers	Portland, Oregon
22:00 (PDT)	Long 21' (pen.); Sinclair 35' 42' 46'; Morgan 52'; McDonald 88'	Summary	Schoepfer 14'; Washington 32'; O'Reilly 39' (pen.)	Stadium: Providence Park; Attendance: 14,383; Referee: (United States) Maraget Domka

July 25, 2014 19	Western New York Flash	2–4	Boston Breakers	Rochester, New York
18:30 (PDT)	Spencer 14'; Lloyd 54'; Kerr (yellow card) 89'	Summary	Sanderson 27' (yellow card) 51'; O'Reilly 30' (pen.) 86'; Reeves 39'; Jones (yellow card) 89'	Stadium: Sahlen's Stadium; Attendance: 3,081; Referee: (United States) Timon Berry

August 3, 2014 20	Boston Breakers	3–4	Western New York Flash	Boston, Massachusetts
17:30 (PDT)	Mewis 28', 76'; Reeves 74'	Summary	Wambach 8' 48'; Kerr 66'; Allen (yellow card) 70'; Bermúdez 90+2'	Stadium: Harvard Stadium; Attendance: 3,754; Referee: (United States) Hernan Aguilar

August 6, 2014 21	FC Kansas City	2–1	Boston Breakers	Kansas City, Missouri
20:00 (PDT)	Rodriquez 7'; Hagen 26'	Summary	O'Reilly 16' (pen.)	Stadium: Durwood Soccer Stadium; Attendance: 1,212; Referee: (United States) David Mon

August 10, 2014 22	Boston Breakers	2–0	Portland Thorns FC	Boston, Massachusetts
17:30 (PDT)	Rachel Wood 14'; O'Reilly 28'; King (yellow card) 53'	Summary	Sinclair (yellow card) 29'	Stadium: Harvard Stadium; Attendance: 4,191; Referee: (United States) Karen Abt

August 13, 2014 23	Chicago Red Stars	2–0	Boston Breakers	Lisle, Illinois
20:00 (PDT)	Mautz 29'; Tancredi 82'	Summary		Stadium: Village of Lisle-Benedictine University Sports Complex; Attendance: 1,311

August 17, 2014 24	Boston Breakers	1–0	Houston Dash	Boston, Massachusetts
17:30 (PDT)	Mewis 77'	Summary		Stadium: Harvard Stadium; Attendance: 3,006; Referee: (United States) Karen Abt

== Standings ==
Pos	Team	Pld	W	D	L	GF	GA	GD	Pts	Qualification
1	Seattle Reign FC	24	16	6	2	50	20	+30	54	NWSL Shield
2	FC Kansas City (C)	24	12	5	7	39	32	+7	41	NWSL Playoffs
3	Portland Thorns FC	24	10	6	8	39	35	+4	36	NWSL Playoffs
4	Washington Spirit	24	10	5	9	36	43	−7	35	NWSL Playoffs
5	Chicago Red Stars	24	9	8	7	32	26	+6	35	
6	Sky Blue FC	24	9	7	8	30	37	−7	34	
7	Western New York Flash	24	8	4	12	42	38	+4	28	
8	Boston Breakers	24	6	2	16	37	53	−16	20	
9	Houston Dash	24	5	3	16	23	44	−21	18	

Source: NWSL
Rules for classification: Tiebreakers
(C) Champions

=== Results summary ===
Overall								Home						Away					
Pld	Pts	W	L	T	GF	GA	GD	W	L	T	GF	GA	GD	W	L	T	GF	GA	GD
24	20	6	16	2	37	53	−16	5	7	0	21	24	−3	1	9	2	16	29	−13

Last updated: August 3, 2015
Pld = Matches played; Pts = Points; W = Matches won; T = Matches tied; L = Matches lost; GF = Goals for; GA = Goals against; GD = Goal difference

== Squad statistics ==
Key to positions: FW – Forward, MF – Midfielder, DF – Defender, GK – Goalkeeper

N	Pos	Player	GP	GS	Min	G	A	WG	Shot	SOG	Cro	CK	Off	Foul	FS	YC	RC
5	DF	Jazmyne Avant	12	9	778	0	0	0	0	0	1	0	1	11	11	2	0
15	MF	Bianca D'Agostino	16	6	679	0	0	0	7	6	0	3	0	13	2	1	0
14	FW	Lisa De Vanna	6	5	448	0	1	0	12	3	1	0	14	3	6	0	1
27	MF	Kim DeCesare	1	0	9	0	0	0	0	0	0	0	0	0	0	0	0
18	MF	Maddy Evans	17	8	730	0	3	0	8	2	2	0	3	11	3	1	1
22	FW	Nkem Ezurike	11	6	503	2	0	0	7	5	1	0	1	6	9	0	0
21	DF	Ashley Grove	9	7	586	0	0	0	3	3	1	0	0	2	1	1	0
3	DF	Courtney Jones	18	13	1296	3	1	0	22	10	7	27	5	23	9	6	0
8	DF	Julie King	17	17	1530	1	1	0	7	5	2	0	0	10	9	1	0
23	MF	Kaylyn Kyle	2	2	155	0	0	0	0	0	0	0	1	2	1	0	0
11	MF	Joanna Lohman	17	14	1231	1	0	0	6	2	0	0	0	17	8	2	0
19	MF	Kristie Mewis	17	15	1191	3	2	1	20	9	2	1	1	9	10	0	0
9	MF	Heather O'Reilly	22	21	1874	9	5	0	53	34	9	37	10	14	10	3	0
20	MF	Mollie Pathman	21	18	1519	0	1	0	4	2	11	5	1	7	6	0	0
7	FW	Jazmine Reeves	17	13	1151	7	1	2	23	12	11	0	13	13	10	1	0
10	MF	Lianne Sanderson	19	17	1524	5	3	1	27	13	5	11	6	13	14	2	1
12	FW	Katie Schoepfer	17	12	989	4	0	1	26	8	2	3	1	9	9	0	0
23	DF	Bianca Sierra	11	9	798	0	1	0	1	0	0	0	0	11	1	1	0
17	DF	Chelsea Stewart	10	7	512	0	0	0	2	0	0	0	0	2	1	0	0
26	DF	Nikki Washington	15	10	939	1	0	0	5	4	6	1	2	7	5	1	0
4	DF	Cat Whitehill	24	24	2101	0	1	0	11	3	2	0	1	15	6	1	0
24	DF	Rachel Wood	7	7	585	1	1	1	6	2	0	0	0	6	1	0	0

N	Pos	Goal keeper	GP	GS	Min	W	L	T	Shot	SOG	Sav	GA	GA/G	Pen	PKF	SO
1	GK	Alyssa Naeher	24	24	2115	6	16	2	326	159	106	53	2.208	6	9	3

== See also ==
- 2014 National Women's Soccer League season
- 2014 in American soccer
