= 2014 National Women's Soccer League season =

2nd season of the National Women's Soccer League

National Women's Soccer League
- Season: 2014
- Champions: FC Kansas City
- NWSL Shield: Seattle Reign FC
- Matches: 108
- Goals: 328 (3.04 per match)
- Top goalscorer: Kim Little (16 goals)
- Biggest home win: POR 7–1 KC (July 13)
- Biggest away win: POR 0–5 WNY (June 7); WAS 1–6 POR (June 21); NJ 0–5 KC (July 6)
- Highest scoring: POR 6–3 BOS (July 20)
- Highest attendance: 19,123 – POR 1–0 HOU (August 3)
- Lowest attendance: 582 – NJ 0–2 SEA (April 30)
- Total attendance: 446,820 (August 20)
- Average attendance: 4,137

The 2014 National Women's Soccer League season was the second season of the National Women's Soccer League, the top division of women's soccer in the United States. Including the NWSL's two professional predecessors, Women's Professional Soccer (2009–2011) and the Women's United Soccer Association (2001–2003), this was the eighth overall season of FIFA and USSF-sanctioned top division women's soccer in the United States. The league was operated by the United States Soccer Federation and received major financial backing from that body. Further financial backing was provided by the Canadian Soccer Association and the Mexican Football Federation. All three national federations paid the league salaries of many of their respective national team members in an effort to nurture talent in those nations.

The regular season began the weekend of April 12–13 and ended August 20, with the championship game played on August 30. FC Kansas City defeated the NWSL Shield winners Seattle Reign FC 2–1 to win the NWSL title.

The league had announced it would not expand for the 2014 season and was not expected to contract. However, after a push from the Houston Dynamo, the league approved the expansion of the Houston Dash.

== Teams, stadia, and personnel ==
=== Stadia and locations ===
See also List of National Women's Soccer League stadiums

Two teams, the Dash and Reign, do not make their stadia's entire capacity available for home games, instead restricting ticket sales at a lower level. The full capacities of their venues are included in parentheses and italics. The Boston Breakers, FC Kansas City, and Seattle Reign FC moved to new stadia for 2014, while the Houston Dash was an expansion franchise.

Team	Stadium	Capacity
Boston Breakers	Harvard Stadium	30,323
Chicago Red Stars	Village Sports Complex	3,600
Houston Dash	BBVA Compass Stadium	7,000 (22,039)
FC Kansas City	Verizon Field	3,200
Portland Thorns	Providence Park	20,438
Seattle Reign FC	Memorial Stadium	6,000 (12,000)
Sky Blue FC	Yurcak Field	5,000
Washington Spirit	Maryland SoccerPlex	5,126
Western New York Flash	Sahlen's Stadium	13,768

Locations of teams for the 2014 National Women's Soccer League season.

=== Personnel and sponsorship ===
Note: All teams use Nike as kit manufacturer.

Team	Head coach	Captain	Shirt sponsor
Boston Breakers	(United States) Tom Durkin	(United States) Cat Whitehill	Steward Health Care
Chicago Red Stars	(United States) Rory Dames	(United States) Lori Chalupny	CJ Wilson Mazda
Houston Dash	(United States) Randy Waldrum	(Canada) Erin McLeod	BBVA Compass
FC Kansas City	(North Macedonia) Vlatko Andonovski	(United States) Becky Sauerbrunn	Research Medical Center
Portland Thorns	(England) Paul Riley	(Canada) Christine Sinclair	Providence Health & Services
Seattle Reign FC	(England) Laura Harvey	(United States) Keelin Winters	Moda Health
Sky Blue FC	(United States) Jim Gabarra	(United States) Christie Rampone	Meridian Health
Washington Spirit	(England) Mark Parsons	(United States) Ali Krieger	ProChain Solutions, Inc.
Western New York Flash	(New Zealand) Aaran Lines	(United States) Abby Wambach	Sahlen's

=== Player Acquisition ===
Players were acquired through the 2014 Allocation of national team players announced on January 3, the 2014 NWSL Expansion Draft (for expansion team Houston) on January 10, and the 2014 NWSL College Draft on January 17, as well as free agency, trading, and loans.

Notable acquisitions

- (United States) Christen Press, top scorer of the 2013 Damallsvenskan in Sweden, was allocated to Chicago.
- Nahomi Kawasumi, named Best Player of the 2013 L. League in Japan, was loaned to Seattle from INAC Kobe Leonessa.
- (United States) Beverly Goebel, top scorer of the 2013 L. League in Japan, was loaned to Seattle from INAC Kobe Leonessa.
- (Scotland) Kim Little, PFA Women's Players' Player of the Year for 2012–13 and top scorer of the 2012 FA WSL in England, was signed as a free agent by Seattle.
- (Spain) Verónica Boquete, Player of the Year of the 2011 WPS in the U.S., was signed as a free agent by Portland, arriving June 7.

== Competition format ==
- Each team will play a total of 24 games, 12 home and 12 away. Each teams will play four opponents twice at home and once away, and will play the other four opponents once at home and twice away.
- The four teams at the end of the season with the most points will qualify for the playoffs. The two semi-final games will be played on the weekend of August 23–24, and the final will be played on August 30.

=== Results table ===
Abbreviation and Color Key: Boston Breakers – BOS • Chicago Red Stars – CHI • Houston Dash – HOU • FC Kansas City – KC • Portland Thorns FC – POR Seattle Reign FC – SEA • Sky Blue FC – NJ • Washington Spirit – WAS • Western New York Flash – WNY Win • Loss • Tie • Home Game
Club	Match																							
Club	1	2	3	4	5	6	7	8	9	10	11	12	13	14	15	16	17	18	19	20	21	22	23	24
Boston Breakers	SEA	HOU	NJ	NJ	CHI	CHI	KC	POR	WAS	KC	WAS	SEA	NJ	WNY	WAS	SEA	HOU	POR	WNY	WNY	KC	POR	CHI	HOU
Boston Breakers	3–0	2–3	3–2	1–0	1–3	1–4	0–2	4–1	2–3	2–0	2–0	0–2	2–2	2–1	3–3	3–2	2–1	6–3	2–4	3–4	2–1	2–0	0–2	1–0
Chicago Red Stars	WNY	WAS	KC	NJ	HOU	BOS	BOS	HOU	NJ	WAS	SEA	NJ	WNY	KC	POR	POR	SEA	POR	SEA	HOU	WAS	KC	BOS	WNY
Chicago Red Stars	1–0	0–1	1–0	1–1	1–0	1–3	1–4	1–3	0–2	0–1	3–1	2–2	2–0	0–1	2–2	1–1	1–0	1–1	1–1	0–0	2–1	2–1	2–0	3–3
Houston Dash	POR	BOS	SEA	KC	CHI	POR	KC	CHI	WAS	WNY	NJ	WNY	KC	WAS	WNY	BOS	WAS	CHI	SEA	POR	SEA	NJ	BOS	NJ
Houston Dash	0–1	2–3	2–0	0–4	1–0	0–1	2–2	1–3	3–2	1–2	0–3	2–1	1–2	0–1	1–4	2–1	1–1	0–0	1–4	1–0	4–1	1–3	1–0	1–0
FC Kansas City	NJ	WAS	POR	CHI	HOU	WNY	WAS	SEA	HOU	SEA	BOS	WNY	BOS	HOU	CHI	POR	NJ	POR	WNY	NJ	WAS	SEA	BOS	CHI
FC Kansas City	1–1	3–1	3–1	1–0	0–4	2–1	2–1	3–2	2–2	1–1	0–2	1–0	2–0	1–2	0–1	1–0	0–5	7–1	1–1	2–1	2–1	1–1	2–1	2–1
Portland Thorns FC	HOU	NJ	KC	WNY	SEA	HOU	WNY	NJ	BOS	WNY	WAS	WAS	NJ	KC	CHI	CHI	KC	CHI	BOS	WAS	SEA	HOU	BOS	SEA
Portland Thorns FC	0–1	1–1	3–1	1–1	0–1	0–1	2–1	0–1	4–1	0–5	2–0	1–6	1–2	1–0	2–2	1–1	7–1	1–1	6–3	1–1	5–0	1–0	2–0	1–0
Seattle Reign FC	BOS	WAS	HOU	NJ	WAS	POR	KC	KC	WNY	NJ	CHI	BOS	WNY	NJ	WNY	BOS	CHI	CHI	POR	HOU	KC	HOU	WAS	POR
Seattle Reign FC	3–0	3–1	2–0	0–2	1–2	0–1	3–2	1–1	2–2	1–3	3–1	0–2	1–2	0–0	1–2	3–2	1–0	1–1	5–0	1–4	1–1	4–1	1–1	1–0
Sky Blue FC	KC	POR	BOS	SEA	BOS	CHI	WNY	WAS	POR	CHI	SEA	HOU	CHI	BOS	POR	SEA	KC	WAS	KC	WNY	HOU	WNY	WAS	HOU
Sky Blue FC	1–1	1–1	3–2	0–2	1–0	1–1	2–0	3–3	0–1	0–2	1–3	0–3	2–2	2–2	1–2	0–0	0–5	4–2	2–1	1–0	1–3	2–3	0–1	1–0
Washington Spirit	WNY	KC	SEA	CHI	SEA	KC	WNY	NJ	HOU	BOS	CHI	BOS	POR	POR	HOU	BOS	WNY	HOU	NJ	POR	KC	CHI	SEA	NJ
Washington Spirit	1–3	3–1	3–1	0–1	1–2	2–1	3–2	3–3	3–2	2–3	0–1	2–0	2–0	1–6	0–1	3–3	0–1	1–1	4–2	1–1	2–1	2–1	1–1	0–1
Western New York Flash	WAS	CHI	POR	KC	NJ	WAS	POR	SEA	HOU	KC	POR	HOU	CHI	SEA	BOS	SEA	HOU	WAS	KC	BOS	NJ	BOS	NJ	CHI
Western New York Flash	1–3	1–0	1–1	2–1	2–0	3–2	2–1	2–2	1–2	0–1	0–5	2–1	2–0	1–2	2–1	1–2	1–4	0–1	1–1	2–4	1–0	3–4	2–3	3–3

Scores listed as home-away

== League standings ==
Pos	Team	Pld	W	D	L	GF	GA	GD	Pts	Qualification
1	Seattle Reign FC	24	16	6	2	50	20	+30	54	NWSL Shield
2	FC Kansas City (C)	24	12	5	7	39	32	+7	41	NWSL Playoffs
3	Portland Thorns FC	24	10	6	8	39	35	+4	36	NWSL Playoffs
4	Washington Spirit	24	10	5	9	36	43	−7	35	NWSL Playoffs
5	Chicago Red Stars	24	9	8	7	32	26	+6	35	
6	Sky Blue FC	24	9	7	8	30	37	−7	34	
7	Western New York Flash	24	8	4	12	42	38	+4	28	
8	Boston Breakers	24	6	2	16	37	53	−16	20	
9	Houston Dash	24	5	3	16	23	44	−21	18	

Source: NWSL
Rules for classification: Tiebreakers
(C) Champions

=== Tiebreakers ===
The initial determining factor for a team's position in the standings is most points earned, with three points earned for a win, one point for a draw, and zero points for a loss. If two or more teams tie in point total, when determining rank and playoff qualification and seeding, the NWSL uses the following tiebreaker rules, going down the list until all teams are ranked.

If two teams tie:

1. Head-to-head win–loss record between the two teams.
2. Greater goal difference across the entire season (against all teams, not just tied teams).
3. Greatest total number of goals scored (against all teams).
4. Apply #1–3 to games played on the road.
5. Apply #1–3 to games played at home.
6. If teams are still equal, ranking will be determined by a coin toss.

If three or more teams tie, the following rules apply until only two teams remain tied, at which point the two-team tiebreakers listed above are used:

1. Points per game against all other tied teams (total all points earned in games against tied teams and divide by games played against tied teams).
2. Greater goal difference across the entire season (against all teams, not just tied teams).

=== Positions by gameweek ===
Considering each week to end on a Sunday

Team \ Week	1	2	3	4	5	6	7	8	9	10	11	12	13	14	15	16	17	18	19
Seattle Reign FC	1	2	1	1	1	1	1	1	1	1	1	1	1	1	1	1	1	1	1
FC Kansas City	4	8	9	3	3	4	3	4	2	2	2	2	2	2	2	2	2	2	2
Portland Thorns FC	3	1	2	2	4	3	4	5	6	5	4	6	6	4	3	3	4	4	3
Washington Spirit	8	5	3	4	6	6	6	3	3	4	5	3	4	3	4	4	3	3	4
Chicago Red Stars	6	4	5	7	5	2	2	2	4	3	3	5	5	5	5	5	5	5	5
Sky Blue FC	4	7	8	5	7	7	7	7	8	8	8	7	7	8	7	7	7	7	6
Western New York Flash	2	3	4	6	2	5	5	6	5	6	6	4	3	6	6	6	6	6	7
Houston Dash	7	6	6	8	8	8	8	8	7	7	7	8	8	7	8	8	8	8	9
Boston Breakers	9	9	7	9	9	9	9	9	9	9	9	9	9	9	9	9	9	9	8

=== Positions by games played ===
Team \ Game	1	2	3	4	5	6	7	8	9	10	11	12	13	14	15	16	17	18	19	20	21	22	23	24
Seattle Reign FC	1	1	1	1	1	1	1	1	1	1	1	1	1	1	1	1	1	1	1	1	1	1	1	1
FC Kansas City	5	8	9	6	4	5	5	6	6	6	5	5	2	2	2	2	2	2	2	2	2	2	2	2
Portland Thorns FC	3	2	2	2	3	2	2	3	3	4	4	3	4	4	5	5	4	4	3	3	4	4	5	3
Washington Spirit	8	4	4	4	6	7	6	5	4	3	2	4	5	5	3	3	3	3	4	4	3	3	3	4
Chicago Red Stars	3	6	5	5	5	3	3	2	2	2	3	2	3	3	4	4	5	5	5	5	5	5	4	5
Sky Blue FC	5	7	8	9	7	6	7	7	7	7	8	8	8	8	7	7	8	7	7	7	6	6	6	6
Western New York Flash	2	3	3	3	2	4	4	4	5	5	6	6	6	6	6	6	6	6	6	6	7	7	7	7
Houston Dash	7	5	6	7	8	8	8	9	9	8	7	7	7	7	8	8	7	8	8	8	8	8	8	9
Boston Breakers	9	9	7	8	9	9	9	8	8	9	9	9	9	9	9	9	9	9	9	9	9	9	9	8

== NWSL Playoffs ==
The top four teams from the regular season qualified for the championship playoffs. The highest-seeded semi-final winner then hosted the championship final.

Semi-finals
1	Seattle Reign FC	2
4	Washington Spirit	1
2	FC Kansas City	2
3	Portland Thorns FC	0

Championship
1	Seattle Reign FC	1
2	FC Kansas City	2

=== Semi-finals ===
August 23, 2014
12:00 pm CDT

FC Kansas City	2–0	Portland Thorns FC
Rodriguez 65'; Phillips (yellow card) 84'; Holiday 87'	Report	Menges (yellow card) 22'

Durwood Soccer Stadium, Kansas City, Missouri
Attendance: 2,997
Referee: Chris Spivey
August 24, 2014
8:00 pm PDT

Seattle Reign FC	2–1	Washington Spirit
Little 72' (pen.); Rapinoe 82'; Fletcher (yellow card) 90+5'	Report	Averbuch (yellow card) 31'; Pérez 65'; Nairn (yellow card) 90+2'

Memorial Stadium, Seattle
Attendance: 4,540
Referee: Timon Berry

=== Championship ===
August 31, 2014
12:00 pm PDT

Seattle Reign FC	1–2	FC Kansas City
Rapinoe 86'; Solo (yellow card) 90+3'	Report; Report; Report	Rodriguez 23', 56'; LePeilbet (yellow card) 79'

Starfire Sports Stadium, Tukwila, Washington
Attendance: 4,252
Referee: Margaret Domka

== Attendance ==
=== Average home attendances ===
Ranked from highest to lowest average attendance.

Team	Average	Total	No. of games	High	Low
Portland Thorns FC	13,362	160,341	12	19,123	9,672
Houston Dash	4,650	55,801	12	8,097	3,561
Seattle Reign FC	3,666	43,996	12	5,957	1,754
Washington Spirit	3,335	40,019	12	4,667	2,306
Western New York Flash	3,177	38,125	12	4,339	1,786
Chicago Red Stars	2,949	35,393	1 (Toyota Park)	15,743	1,039
Chicago Red Stars	2,949	35,393	11 (Benedictine Stadium)	3,032	1,039
Boston Breakers	2,437	29,248	12	4,191	1,263
FC Kansas City	2,018	24,215	12	3,107	1,212
Sky Blue FC	1,640	19,682	12	3,471	582

A new NWSL attendance record of 19,123 was set on August 3 in a game between Portland and Houston at Providence Park in Portland, breaking the previous record of 17,619 set in 2013.

=== Playoff Attendance ===
Semi-final No. 1, August 23, Portland at Kansas City: 2,997

Semi-final No. 2, August 24, Washington at Seattle: 4,540

Final, August 31, Kansas City at Seattle: 4,252

== Statistical leaders ==
=== Top scorers ===
Rank	Player	Nation	Club	Goals
1	Kim Little	SCO	Seattle Reign FC	16
2	Amy Rodriguez	USA	FC Kansas City	13
3	Jessica McDonald	USA	Portland Thorns FC	11
3	Jodie Taylor	ENG	Washington Spirit	11
5	Nahomi Kawasumi	JPN	Seattle Reign FC	9
5	Samantha Kerr	AUS	Western New York Flash	9
5	Heather O'Reilly	USA	Boston Breakers	9
5	Allie Long	USA	Portland Thorns FC	9
9	Lauren Holiday	USA	FC Kansas City	8
9	Carli Lloyd	USA	Western New York Flash	8
9	Diana Matheson	CAN	Washington Spirit	8

=== Top assists ===
Rank	Player	Nation	Club	Assists
1	Jessica Fishlock	WAL	Seattle Reign FC	8
2	Lauren Holiday	USA	FC Kansas City	7
2	Kim Little	SCO	Seattle Reign FC	7
4	Verónica Boquete	SPA	Portland Thorns FC	6
4	Vicky Losada	SPA	Western New York Flash	6
4	Diana Matheson	CAN	Washington Spirit	6
7	Carli Lloyd	USA	Western New York Flash	5
7	Nahomi Kawasumi	JPN	Seattle Reign FC	5
7	Kelley O'Hara	USA	Sky Blue FC	5
7	Heather O'Reilly	USA	Boston Breakers	5

=== Goalkeeping ===
(Minimum of 1,080 Minutes Played)

Rank	Goalkeeper	Club	GP	MINS	SOG	SVS	GA	GAA	W-L-T	SHO
1	(United States) Hope Solo	Seattle Reign FC	20	1800	83	65	18	0.900	13–2–5	5
2	(Canada) Karina LeBlanc	Chicago Red Stars	21	1890	97	76	21	1.000	9–6–6	6
3	(Australia) Lydia Williams	Western New York Flash	14	1183	65	49	15	1.141	6–6–1	2
4	(United States) Nicole Barnhart	FC Kansas City	22	1935	100	71	29	1.349	11–6–5	8
5	(Germany) Nadine Angerer	Portland Thorns FC	22	1917	104	74	30	1.408	8–8–6	4
6	(United States) Jillian Loyden	Sky Blue FC	17	1530	94	69	25	1.471	7–5–5	4
7	(United States) Ashlyn Harris	Washington Spirit	19	1710	97	66	31	1.632	10–5–4	4
8	(Canada) Erin McLeod	Houston Dash	19	1755	120	83	35	1.750	4–12–3	2
9	(United States) Alyssa Naeher	Boston Breakers	24	2115	159	106	53	2.208	6–16–2	3

== Individual awards ==
=== Weekly awards ===
Week	Player of the Week		Club	Week's Statline
Week 1	(Spain)	Vicky Losada	Western New York Flash	2G, 1A, GWA
Week 2	(Mexico)	Teresa Noyola	Houston Dash	2G, GWG
Week 3	(England)	Lianne Sanderson	Boston Breakers	2G, 1A, GWG
Week 4	(United States)	Sydney Leroux	Seattle Reign FC	1G, GWG
Week 5	(United States)	Amy Rodriguez	FC Kansas City	2G, GWG
Week 6	(England)	Jodie Taylor	Washington Spirit	2G, GWG
Week 7	(United States)	Kelley O'Hara	Sky Blue FC	1G, 1A; 1G, GWG
Week 8	(United States)	Jazmine Reeves	Boston Breakers	3G, 1A
Week 9	(Australia)	Samantha Kerr	Western New York Flash	2G, 1A, GWA
Week 10	(Spain)	Verónica Boquete	Portland Thorns FC	1G, GWG
Week 11	(United States)	Alex Morgan	Portland Thorns FC	1A, 2G
Week 12	(United States)	Carli Lloyd	Western New York Flash	2G, GWG
Week 13	(Japan)	Nahomi Kawasumi	Seattle Reign FC	2G, GWG
Week 14	(Spain)	Verónica Boquete	Portland Thorns FC	2G, 2A
Week 15	(Canada)	Christine Sinclair	Portland Thorns FC	3G
Week 16	(Japan)	Nahomi Kawasumi	Seattle Reign FC	2G, 1A
Week 17	(Spain)	Verónica Boquete	Portland Thorns FC	1G
Week 18	(United States)	Alyssa Naeher	Boston Breakers	10 saves
Week 19	(Denmark)	Nadia Nadim	Sky Blue FC	2G, GWG, 1A

=== Monthly awards ===
Month	Player of the Month		Club	Month's Statline
April	(Scotland)	Kim Little	Seattle Reign FC	4G in 4 games; Reign 4-0-0 in April
May	(Scotland)	Kim Little	Seattle Reign FC	4G in 5 games; Reign 3-0-2 in May
June	(United States)	Nicole Barnhart	FC Kansas City	1.1 GAA, 4SHO in 4 games; FCKC 5-0-0 in June
July	(Scotland)	Kim Little	Seattle Reign FC	3G, 4A in 6 games; Reign 4-1-1 in July
August	(Denmark)	Nadia Nadim	Sky Blue FC	5G, 1A in 2 games; Sky Blue 4-0-0 in August

=== Annual awards ===
Award	Winner			Runner-up		Third place	
Golden Boot	(Scotland) Kim Little	Seattle Reign FC	16 Goals	(United States) Amy Rodriguez	FC Kansas City	(United States) Jessica McDonald (England) Jodie Taylor	Portland Thorns FC; Washington Spirit
Rookie of the Year	(United States) Julie Johnston	Chicago Red Stars	2 goals, 2 assists	(United States) Kealia Ohai	Houston Dash	(United States) Crystal Dunn	Washington Spirit
Goalkeeper of the Year	(United States) Alyssa Naeher	Boston Breakers	106 saves	(United States) Hope Solo	Seattle Reign FC	(United States) Ashlyn Harris	Washington Spirit
Defender of the Year	(United States) Becky Sauerbrunn	FC Kansas City	1935 minutes, 1.33 GAA	(United States) Ali Krieger (United States) Julie Johnston	Washington Spirit; Chicago Red Stars		
Coach of the Year	(England) Laura Harvey	Seattle Reign FC	16–2–6 regular season	(England) Mark Parsons	Washington Spirit	(North Macedonia) Vlatko Andonovski	FC Kansas City
Most Valuable Player	(Scotland) Kim Little	Seattle Reign FC	16 goals, 7 assists	(Spain) Veronica Boquete	Portland Thorns	(United States) Amy Rodriguez	FC Kansas City

NWSL Best XI
Position	First team			Second team		
Goalkeeper	(United States) Alyssa Naeher	Boston Breakers	106 saves	(United States) Hope Solo	Seattle Reign FC	5 shutouts
Defender	(United States) Kendall Fletcher	Seattle Reign FC	.83 team GAA	(United States) Lauren Barnes	Seattle Reign FC	.83 team GAA
Defender	(United States) Ali Krieger	Washington Spirit	1 goal	(Australia) Stephanie Catley	Portland Thorns FC	5 assists
Defender	(United States) Christie Rampone	Sky Blue FC	1 goal, 2 assists	(United States) Stephanie Cox	Seattle Reign FC	.83 team GAA
Defender	(United States) Becky Sauerbrunn	FC Kansas City	8 shutouts	(United States) Julie Johnston	Chicago Red Stars	Rookie of the Year
Midfielder	(Spain) Verónica Boquete	Portland Thorns FC	4 goals, 6 assists	(United States) Carli Lloyd	Western New York Flash	8 goals, 5 assists
Midfielder	(Wales) Jess Fishlock	Seattle Reign FC	4 goals, 8 assists	(United States) Allie Long	Portland Thorns FC	9 goals, 3 assists
Midfielder	(Scotland) Kim Little	Seattle Reign FC	16 goals, 7 assists	(United States) Heather O'Reilly	Boston Breakers	9 goals, 5 assists
Forward	(United States) Lauren Holiday	FC Kansas City	8 goals, 7 assists	(United States) Jessica McDonald	Portland Thorns FC	11 goals, 1 assist
Forward	(Japan) Nahomi Kawasumi	Seattle Reign FC	9 goals, 5 assists	(United States) Christen Press	Chicago Red Stars	6 goals
Forward	(United States) Amy Rodriguez	FC Kansas City	13 goals, 3 assists	(England) Jodie Taylor	Washington Spirit	11 goals, 2 assist

NWSL Championship Game MVP
Player	Club	Record
(United States) Lauren Holiday	FC Kansas City	Two assists including for the game-winning goal

== Statistics ==
=== Scoring ===
- First goal of the season: Amy Rodriguez for FC Kansas City against Sky Blue FC (April 12)
- Earliest goal in a match: 33 seconds
  - Jessica McDonald for Portland Thorns against Chicago Red Stars (July 17)
- Latest goal in a match: 90+4 minutes
  - Yael Averbuch for Washington Spirit against Chicago Red Stars (August 2)
- Widest winning margin: 6 goals
  - FC Kansas City 1–7 Portland Thorns FC (July 13)
- Most goals scored in a match: 9
  - Portland Thorns FC 6–3 Boston Breakers (July 20)
- First Own Goal: Amy Barczuk of Western New York Flash for Washington Spirit (April 13)
- Average goals per match: 2.98

==== Hat-tricks ====
Player	For	Against	Result	Date
Jazmine Reeves	Boston Breakers	Portland Thorns FC	4–1	5/28
Christine Sinclair	Portland Thorns FC	Boston Breakers	6–3	7/20
Nadia Nadim	Sky Blue FC	Houston Dash	3–1	8/09

=== Discipline ===
- First yellow card: Allie Long for Portland Thorns FC against Houston Dash (April 12)
- First red card: Lisa de Vanna for Boston Breakers against Sky Blue FC
- Most yellow cards in a match: 9
  - Seattle Reign FC 3–1 Chicago Red Stars – 4 for Seattle and 5 for Chicago
- Most yellow cards: 6
  - Courtney Jones (Boston Breakers)

=== Streaks ===
- Longest winning streak: 7 games
  - Seattle Reign FC, games 1–7
  - FC Kansas City, games 11–17
- Longest unbeaten streak: 16 games
  - Seattle Reign FC, games 1–16
- Longest winless streak: 8 games
  - Houston Dash, games 17–24
- Longest losing streak: 6 games
  - Houston Dash, games 19–24
- Longest shutout: 587 minutes by Nicole Barnhart for FC Kansas City
- Longest drought: 379 minutes for Houston Dash

== See also ==
- List of top-division football clubs in CONCACAF countries
- List of professional sports teams in the United States and Canada
