= Sophia Mundy =

American soccer player

Personal information
- Full name: Sophia Andrea Mundy
- Date of birth: August 15, 1985 (age 41)
- Place of birth: Houston, Texas, U.S.
- Height: 5 ft 3 in (1.60 m)
- Position: Midfielder

College career
Years	Team	Apps	(Gls)
2003–2004	Portland State Vikings		
2005–2006	Houston Cougars		

Senior career*
Years	Team	Apps	(Gls)
2007	Afturelding		
2008	Valur		
2009	Boston Aztec	5	(2)
2009	Boston Breakers	3	(0)
2010	Atlanta Beat	6	
- * Club domestic league appearances and goals

Sophia Andrea Mundy (born August 15, 1985) is an American soccer midfielder who last played for Atlanta Beat of Women's Professional Soccer.
