= Alyssa Naeher =

American soccer player (born 1988)

- Naeher with the Chicago Stars in 2026

Personal information
- Full name: Alyssa Michele Naeher
- Date of birth: April 20, 1988 (age 38)
- Place of birth: Bridgeport, Connecticut, U.S.
- Height: 5 ft 9 in (1.75 m)
- Position: Goalkeeper

Team information
- Current team: Chicago Stars
- Number: 1

College career
Years	Team	Apps	(Gls)
2006–2009	Penn State Nittany Lions	88	(0)

Senior career*
Years	Team	Apps	(Gls)
2006	Western Mass Lady Pioneers	11	(0)
2008	SoccerPlus Connecticut		(0)
2010–2011	Boston Breakers	36	(0)
2011–2013	Turbine Potsdam	39	(0)
2013–2015	Boston Breakers	45	(0)
2016–2026	Chicago Stars	179	(1)

International career^{‡}
2004	United States U-16		
2005	United States U-17		
2007–2008	United States U-20		
2009–2011	United States U-23		
2014–2024	United States	115	(0)
Medal record
Women's soccer
Representing the United States
FIFA Women's World Cup
Gold medal – first place	2015 Canada	Team
Gold medal – first place	2019 France	Team
Olympic Games
Gold medal – first place	2024 Paris	Team
Bronze medal – third place	2020 Tokyo	Team
CONCACAF W Championship
Winner	2018 United States
Winner	2022 Mexico
CONCACAF W Gold Cup
Winner	2024 United States
Pan American Games
Silver medal – second place	2007 Rio de Janeiro	Team
- * Club domestic league appearances and goals as of 05:44, November 2, 2026 (UTC) ‡ National team caps and goals as of December 3, 2024

Alyssa Michele Naeher (/nɛər/ NAIR; born April 20, 1988) is a former American professional soccer player who played as a goalkeeper for Chicago Stars FC of the National Women's Soccer League (NWSL) and the United States national team.

Naeher played college soccer for the Penn State Nittany Lions, earning two-time first-team All-American honors. She began her professional career with the Boston Breakers in Women's Professional Soccer in 2010, but when the league folded, she went to Turbine Potsdam in Germany. She returned to the Boston Breakers when the NWSL formed and was named NWSL Goalkeeper of the Year in 2014. She has been the starting goalkeeper for Chicago since 2016. She holds the all-time NWSL record for most saves by a goalkeeper.

Naeher made 115 appearances for the United States national team between 2014 and 2024. She was the starting goalkeeper for the winning squads at the 2019 FIFA Women's World Cup and the 2024 Paris Olympics and also played at the 2020 Tokyo Olympics, taking home the bronze medal, and the 2023 FIFA Women's World Cup. She was Hope Solo's backup at the 2015 FIFA Women's World Cup, which the United States won, and the 2016 Rio Olympics. She was named the Best FIFA Women’s Goalkeeper in 2024.

== Early life ==
Naeher grew up in Connecticut and attended Christian Heritage School, where she was a standout player in soccer. She was a three-time All-State and three-time FAA All-Conference selection. In addition to this, she was a Parade All-American and two-time NSCAA Youth All-American. Naeher also was a star basketball player, scoring over 2,000 points during her career.

Naeher played the 2006 USL W-League season with the Western Mass Lady Pioneers, making 11 appearances and only allowing a 0.59 goals against average.

=== Penn State University ===
Naeher attended Penn State from 2006 to 2009. She started 74 games during that span with a record of 50–19–5, including 24 shutouts. She was a first-team All-American in 2007 and 2008 and was named the Big Ten Defensive Player of the Year in 2007.

== Club career ==
=== Boston Breakers (WPS), 2010–2011 ===
Naeher was selected by the Boston Breakers with the 11th overall pick in the 2010 Women's Professional Soccer draft; she was the first goalkeeper selected in the 2010 WPS draft. Naeher recorded her first career shutout on August 4, 2010, against the Atlanta Beat. The Breakers finished second in the WPS standings that season but lost the Super Semifinal to the Philadelphia Independence.

=== Turbine Potsdam, 2011–2013 ===
After the 2011 WPS season concluded, Naeher transferred to German Bundesliga club Turbine Potsdam. She appeared in 24 matches across all competitions in the 2011/2012 season for Potsdam as they won the 2011–12 Frauen-Bundesliga. Naeher returned to Potsdam for the 2012/2013 season after the 2012 WPS season was suspended.

=== Boston Breakers, 2013–2015 ===
In May 2013, Naeher signed with the Boston Breakers in the newly formed National Women's Soccer League, returning to the United States after playing for two years in Germany.

During the 2014 National Women's Soccer League season, Naeher played every minute for Boston and won the Goalkeeper of the Year award as she recorded a record 106 saves in 24 games.

On November 22, 2015, Naeher was traded from the Boston Breakers to the Chicago Red Stars for defender Whitney Engen.

=== Chicago Red Stars (Chicago Stars FC), 2016–2026 ===
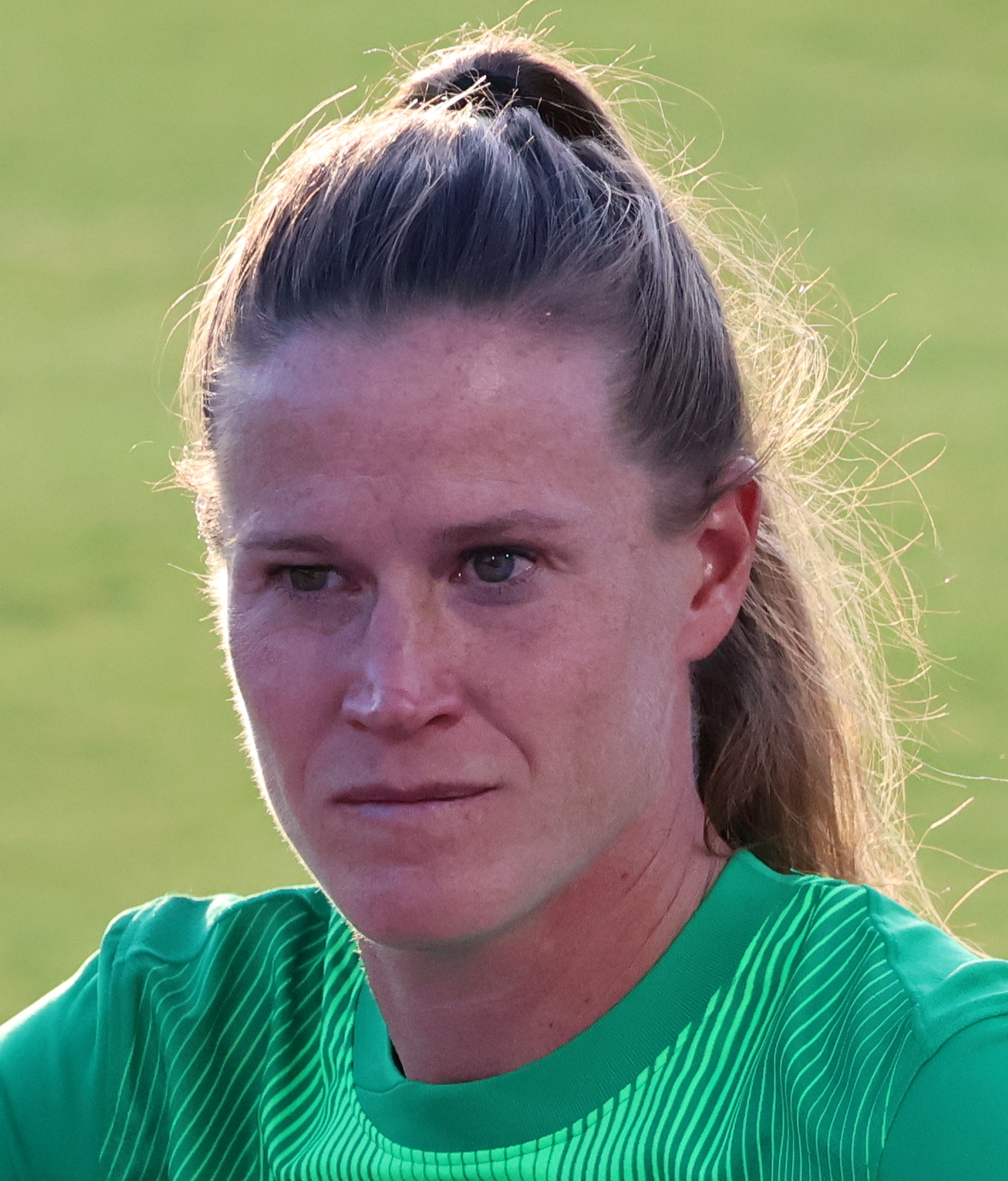
Naeher with the Chicago Stars in 2025

Naeher had a strong start to the 2016 NWSL season in Chicago; she was named Player of the Month for May, posting three shutouts and allowing just one goal in four games. She was one of three finalists for Goalkeeper of the Year.

Naeher was again nominated for Goalkeeper of the Year in the 2017 season.

Naeher was named Player of the Week in week 6 of the 2018 season by the NWSL Media Association; she was also named to the Team of the Month in June 2018.

On August 18, 2018, Naeher earned her 100th NWSL cap in a 2–2 draw against the Portland Thorns FC.

On March 23, 2024, Naeher made NWSL history by becoming the first goalkeeper with 50 wins for a single club when the Red Stars defeated Seattle Reign FC in a 2–1 victory.

On November 14, 2026 Naeher announced that she would retire at the end of the 2026 season.

== International career ==
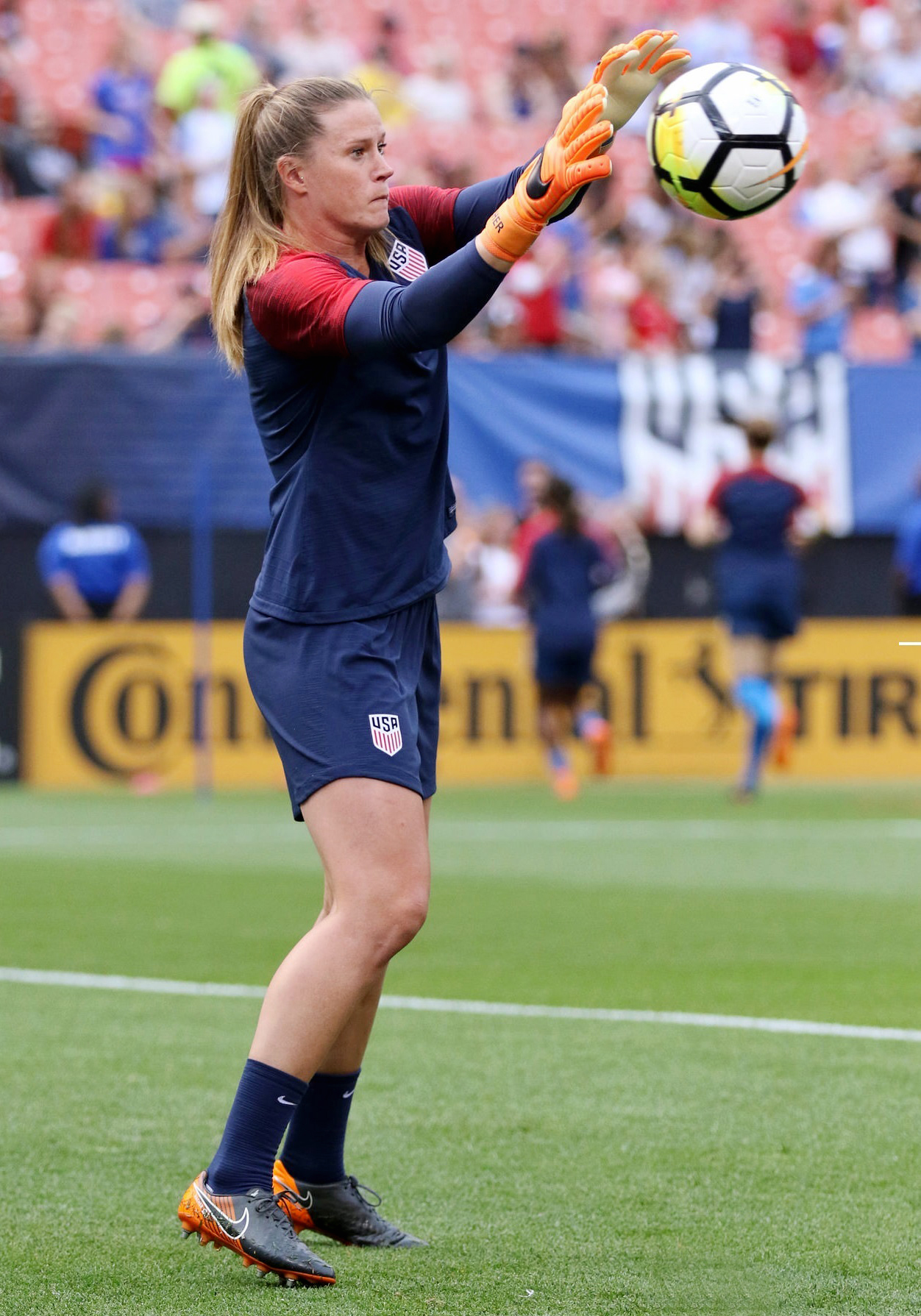
Naeher with the USWNT in 2018

Naeher was a member of the United States U-20 national team that played at the 2007 Pan-American Games, where they finished as silver medalists, losing 5–0 in the final to the full Brazilian national team.

In 2008, Naeher was the starting goalkeeper for the U-20 squad that won the 2008 FIFA U-20 World Cup in Chile. She started and played in all but one game during the tournament. She only conceded one goal throughout the World Cup, which was to North Korea during the final minutes of the championship game. She was awarded the Golden Glove Award as the best goalkeeper in the tournament.

On December 18, 2014, Naeher made her first appearance and start for the United States Women's National Team in a 7–0 win over Argentina in the International Tournament of Brazil. She played the full 90 minutes and earned her first career shutout.

Naeher was on the roster for the 2015 World Cup in Canada as a backup for Hope Solo but did not play, as Solo played every minute in goal as the United States won its third World Cup.

In July 2016, Naeher was named to the USWNT roster for the 2016 Summer Olympics in Rio, Brazil.

Since the United States' loss at the 2016 Summer Olympics, Naeher has become the USWNT's number one goalkeeper, taking over the spot that had been held by Solo for years.

Naeher was the primary goalkeeper for the United States at the 2018 CONCACAF Championship; she played in four of the five matches and earned four shutouts. The U.S won their second consecutive CONCACAF Championship with a 2–0 win over Canada.

=== 2019 FIFA Women's World Cup ===
On May 2, 2019, Naeher was named to the United States roster for the 2019 World Cup; this was her second World Cup. Naeher entered the tournament as the U.S.'s number one goalkeeper. When Naeher started the team's first group game on June 11, it was the first time in over two decades that neither Hope Solo nor Briana Scurry was in goal for the U.S at a World Cup. Naeher recorded three consecutive shutouts in the group stage as the U.S won 13–0, over Thailand, 3–0 over Chile and 2–0 over Sweden.

In the knockout round, Naeher made four saves against France in the quarterfinals to help the team preserve a 2–1 victory over the host nation. In the semifinals, Naeher had three saves and stopped Steph Houghton's penalty kick in the 83rd minute to help the United States to a 2–1 victory over England. In Sunday's final, Naeher posted one save to culminate in a shutout over the Netherlands in a 2–0 victory for the U.S., resulting in the team repeating as World Cup champions. Naeher played every minute of the USWNT's successful 2019 World Cup run.

=== 2020 Summer Olympics ===
On June 23, 2021, Naeher was nominated for the 2020 Summer Olympics, which were postponed by a year due to the COVID-19 pandemic. Naeher brought her team into the semi-finals with three saved penalties in the quarter-finals against European champions Netherlands: a save in the 81st minute and two additional saves in the penalty shootout. She was in goal until the 30th minute of the semi-final against Canada and then had to be replaced by Adrianna Franch due to injury. Her team won the bronze medal.

=== 2023 FIFA Women's World Cup ===
Naeher was named to the United States roster for the 2023 World Cup, her third World Cup. In the Round of 16 match against Sweden, Naeher saved one penalty kick and nearly saved Lina Hurtig's shot, but the ball crossed the goal line by millimeters and knocked the United States out of the World Cup. She was the first goalkeeper ever to take a penalty at a World Cup (women's or men's), and the first to both score from the penalty spot and save a penalty.

=== 2024 CONCACAF W Gold Cup ===
On February 7, 2024, Naeher was named to the roster for the inaugural 2024 CONCACAF W Gold Cup. During the tournament, Naeher played 5 of the 6 matches and also earned her 100th national team cap during the quarter-final match against Colombia, where she kept a clean sheet in a 3–0 victory. Naeher became the third goalkeeper in the history of the USWNT team to make 100 appearances for the senior team, following Brianna Scurry and Hope Solo.

Naeher was highly praised for her performance in the semi-final match against Canada, where she saved three penalty kicks and also converted one herself after the game went to a penalty shootout as a result of a 2–2 draw in regular and extra time. Naeher was named the best goalkeeper of the tournament and earned the Golden Glove award for her performances as the U.S. went on to win the inaugural Gold Cup, defeating Brazil 1–0.

=== 2024 Summer Olympics ===
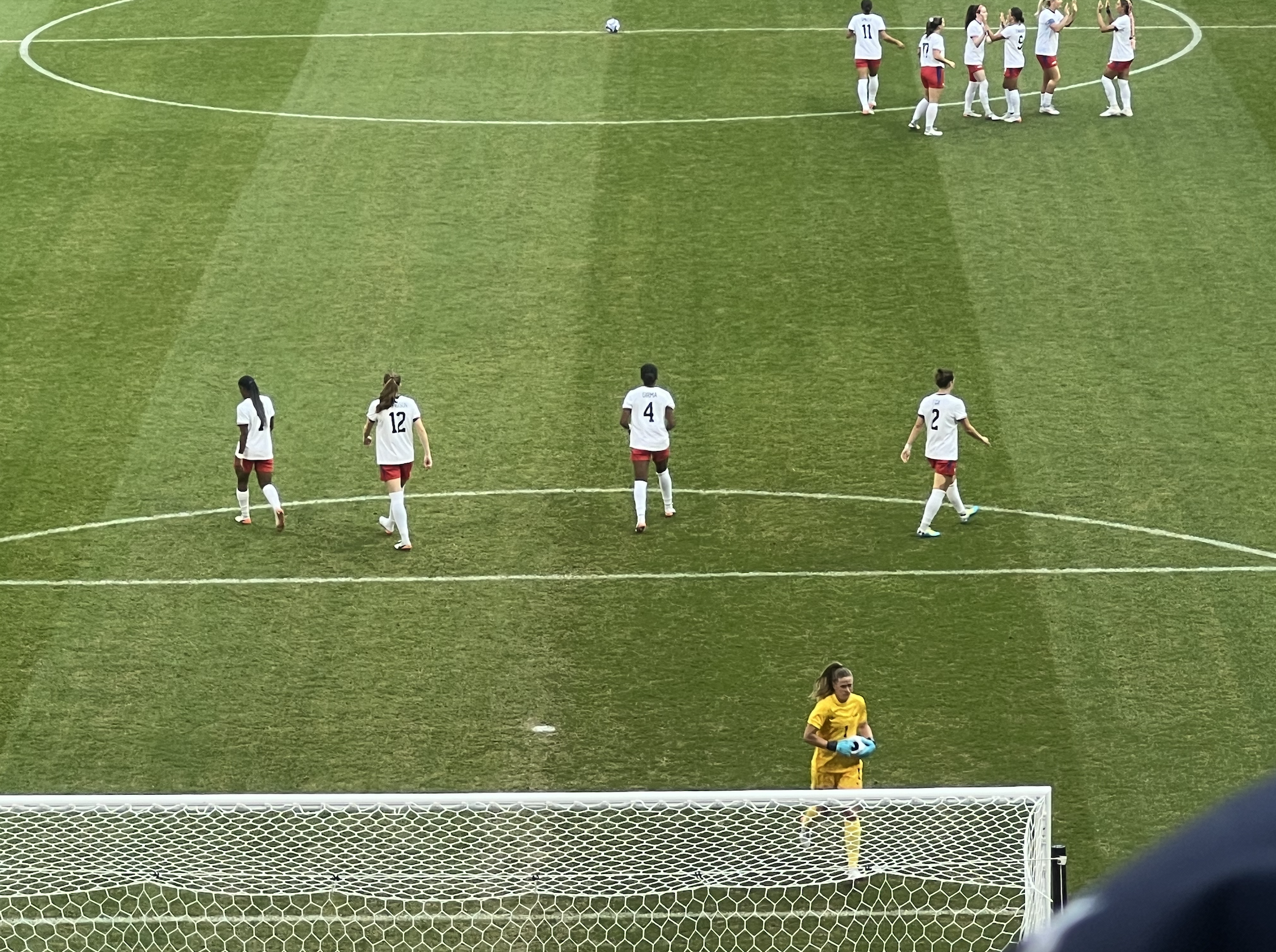
Naeher and the USWNT defense getting ready for their semifinal against Germany at the 2024 Olympics.

On June 26, 2024, Naeher was named to the United States roster for the 2024 Summer Olympics, her third Olympic tournament. She made seven saves to shut out Germany in the semi-finals, including a game-winning kick save in the last seconds of extra time. She made key saves against Brazil's Gabi Portilho and Adriana in the final, which the United States won 1–0 on a goal from Mallory Swanson.

During the tournament, Naeher recorded four shutouts, passing Hope Solo for the most shutouts by any US Women’s National Team goalkeeper in a single Olympic games.

On November 25, 2024, Naeher announced that she would retire from international play at the end of the year. She played her final international game on December 3, 2024, a 2–1 victory over the Netherlands in which she made several strong saves. For her performances during her final year, Naeher was named U.S. Soccer's 2024 Female Player of the Year. Naeher is the second goalkeeper to win this award. Her career was honored by the national team in a pre-match ceremony before the US Women's 3–1 friendly win against Portugal on October 26, 2025.

=== 2026 Retirement Letter to Instagram ===
"It's hard to put the last 17 years into words. I've given everything I have to this game, and it's given me memories and experiences that I will never forget. I got to represent two of the best sports cities in the world in Boston and Chicago, as well as a chance to play European football in Potsdam. The people you get to live this crazy life with are what make it truly special. The ones you celebrate with in success and victory, and those that encourage and stand with you in disappointment; all the little moments we shared in between on and off the field. To my incredible teammates, from the ones who taught me how to be a pro when I was a young rookie to the ones I got to finish my career alongside, and everyone in between, thank you. Whether it was 1 or 10+ seasons together, I appreciate all of you! To the coaches who believed in me and challenged me, thank you for helping me become a better player and leader. And to everyone who worked behind the scenes to keep me healthy and on the field, thank you for taking such good care of me. To the fans, thank you for your continual support over the years. To my family, you've been there since I first kicked a ball 35 years ago. Thank you for your unconditional love and support every step of the way and I could not have done any of it without you. God has blessed me with a career far beyond anything I could have dreamed of. I am truly grateful for the game and for the lifelong friends it brought into my life and abundance of memories."

== Personal life ==
Naeher is the daughter of John and Donna Lynn Naeher. She has a twin sister named Amanda, who played soccer for Messiah College, and a younger sister named Abigail. She is of German, English, and French Canadian ancestry. Naeher is a Christian. Naeher is a fan of the New England Patriots.

== In popular culture ==
=== Video games ===
Naeher was featured along with her USWNT teammates in the EA Sports' FIFA video game FIFA 16, the first time women players were included in the game.

=== Ticker tape parade and White House honor ===
Following the United States' win at the 2015 FIFA Women's World Cup, Naeher and her teammates became the first women's sports team to be honored with a ticker tape parade in New York City. Each player received a key to the city from Mayor Bill de Blasio. In October of the same year, the team was honored by President Barack Obama at the White House.

=== Music ===
Wick Bambix dedicated the song "Alyssa" to Naeher in 2023.

== Career statistics ==
=== Club ===
As of matches played March 23, 2024

Appearances and goals by club, season and competition
Club	Season	Leagues			National Cup		Continental		Other		Total	
Club	Season	Division	Apps	Goals	Apps	Goals	Apps	Goals	Apps	Goals	Apps	Goals
Boston Breakers	2010	WPS	17	0	—		—		—		17	0
Boston Breakers	2011	WPS	19	0	—		—		—		19	0
Boston Breakers	Total		36	0	—		—		—		36	0
Turbine Potsdam	2011–12	FRB	17	0	1	0	6	0	—		24	0
Turbine Potsdam	2012–13	FRB	22	0	5	0	3	0	—		30	0
Turbine Potsdam	Total		39	0	6	0	9	0	—		54	0
Boston Breakers	2013	NWSL	9	0	—		—		—		9	0
Boston Breakers	2014	NWSL	24	0	—		—		—		24	0
Boston Breakers	2015	NWSL	12	0	—		—		—		12	0
Boston Breakers	Total		45	0	—		—		—		45	0
Chicago Red Stars	2016	NWSL	14	0	—		—		—		14	0
Chicago Red Stars	2017	NWSL	23	0	—		—		—		23	0
Chicago Red Stars	2018	NWSL	23	0	—		—		—		23	0
Chicago Red Stars	2019	NWSL	16	0	—		—		—		16	0
Chicago Red Stars	2020	NWSL	4	0	6	0	—		—		10	0
Chicago Red Stars	2021	NWSL	8	0	2	0	—		—		10	0
Chicago Red Stars	2022	NWSL	20	0	6	0	—		—		26	0
Chicago Red Stars	2023	NWSL	20	0	3	0	—		—		23	0
Chicago Red Stars	2024	NWSL	2	0	—		—		—		2	0
Chicago Red Stars	Total		130	0	17	0	—		—		147	0
Career totals			250	0	23	0	9	0	—		282	0

=== International ===
As of match played December 3, 2024

Appearances and goals by national team and year
National team	Year	Apps	Goals
United States	2014	1	0
United States	2015	3	0
United States	2016	6	0
United States	2017	13	0
United States	2018	15	0
United States	2019	19	0
United States	2020	7	0
United States	2021	14	0
United States	2022	8	0
United States	2023	11	0
United States	2024	18	0
Total		115	0

== Honors ==
United States U20

- FIFA U20 Women's World Cup: 2008
- CONCACAF Women's U-20 Championship runner-up: 2008

United States

- FIFA Women's World Cup: 2015, 2019
- Summer Olympic Games Gold Medal: 2024
- Summer Olympic Games Bronze Medal: 2020
- CONCACAF Women's Championship: 2018; 2022
- CONCACAF W Gold Cup: 2024
- CONCACAF Women's Olympic Qualifying Tournament: 2016; 2020
- SheBelieves Cup: 2016; 2018; 2020, 2021; 2022; 2023,2024
- Tournament of Nations: 2018

Individual

- The Best FIFA Women's Goalkeeper: 2024
- The Best FIFA Women's 11: 2024
- U.S. Soccer Player of the Year: 2024
- ESPN FC Women's Rank: #30 on the 2024 list of 50 best women's soccer players 2024
- CONCACAF Goalkeeper of the Year: 2018
- CONCACAF Best XI: 2018
- CONCACAF W Gold Cup Golden Glove: 2024
- CONCACAF W Gold Cup Best XI: 2024
- NWSL Goalkeeper of the Year: 2014
- NWSL Best XI: 2014
- NWSL Second XI: 2016
- FIFA U-20 Women's World Cup Golden Glove: 2008
- FIFA U-20 Women's World Cup All star team: 2008
- IFFHS Women's World's Best Goalkeeper: 2024
- IFFHS Women's World Team: 2024

== See also ==
- List of Pennsylvania State University Olympians
