= Nikki Washington =

American soccer player (born 1988)

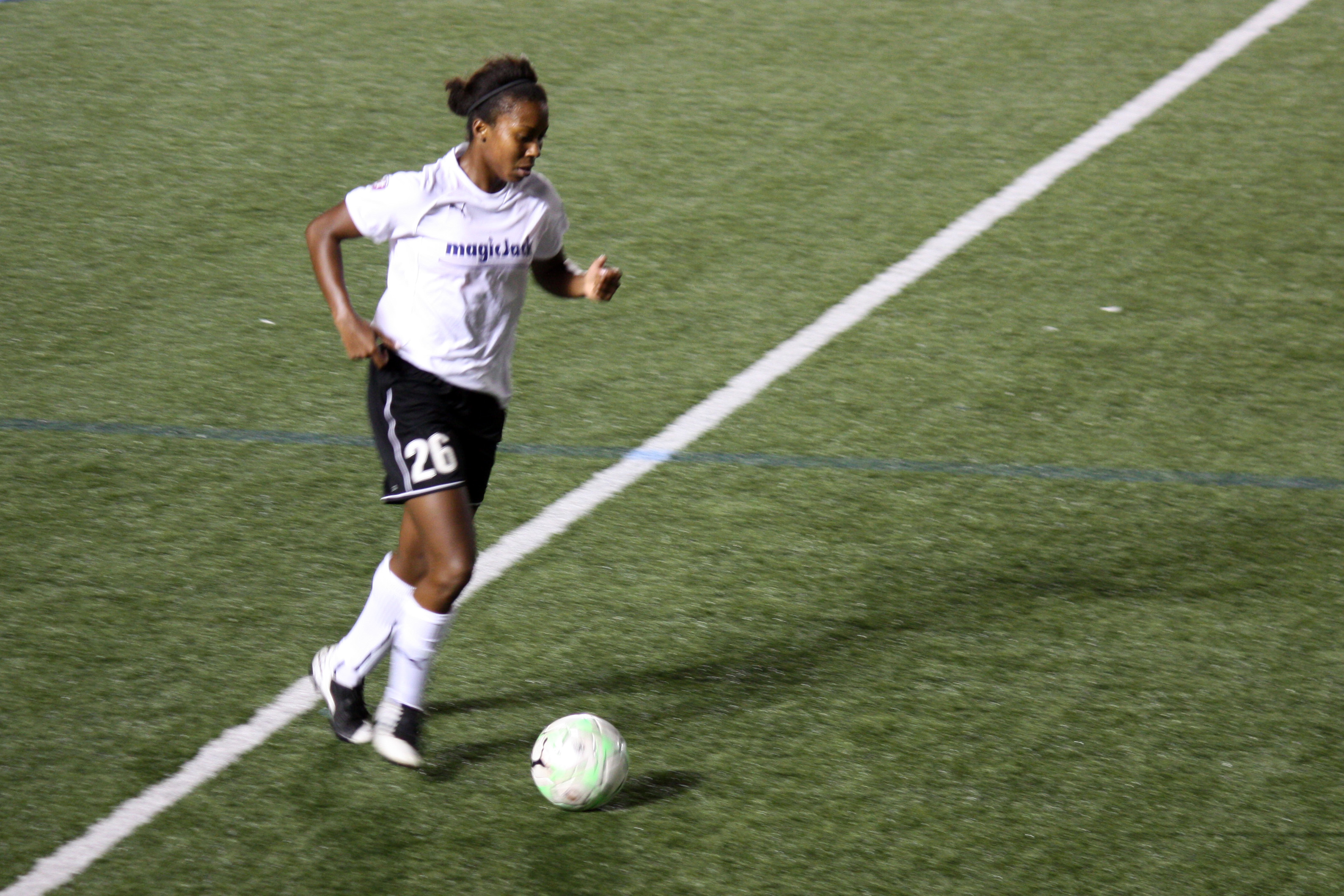
- Washington in August 2011

Personal information
- Full name: Madeline Nicole Washington
- Date of birth: August 1, 1988 (age 38)
- Place of birth: Mesquite, Texas, United States
- Height: 5 ft 4 in (1.63 m)
- Positions: Forward; right midfielder

Youth career
- 2003–2005: Dallas Texans

College career
Years	Team	Apps	(Gls)
2006–2009	North Carolina Tar Heels		

Senior career*
Years	Team	Apps	(Gls)
2009	Pali Blues	11	(0)
2010	Los Angeles Sol	0	(0)
2010	Sky Blue FC	0	(0)
2010	Saint Louis Athletica	0	(0)
2010	Chicago Red Stars	5	(0)
2011	Boston Breakers	5	(0)
2011	magicJack	14	(0)
2012	Pali Blues	11	(0)
2012	Canberra United	5	(3)
2013	Portland Thorns FC	9	(1)
2014	Houston Dash	3	(0)
2014–2015	Boston Breakers	15	(1)

International career
2007–2008	United States U-20		
2009–2011	United States U-23		
Medal record
Women's soccer
Representing United States
Pan American Games
Silver medal – second place	2007 Rio de Janeiro	Team
- * Club domestic league appearances and goals

Madeline Nicole Washington (born August 1, 1988) is an American retired professional soccer forward and right midfielder who last played for Boston Breakers in the National Women's Soccer League (NWSL) and is currently an assistant coach for the women's soccer team at the University of Washington. She previously played for Chicago Red Stars, Boston Breakers, and magicJack in Women's Professional Soccer as well as the Portland Thorns FC and Houston Dash in the NWSL. She captained the United States team that won the 2008 FIFA U-20 Women's World Cup and played for the under-23 team.

== Early life ==
Born in Mesquite, Texas to parents Freida and Lecolion Washington, Washington was named after her grandmother. She has two brothers and one sister.

Washington spent her first freshman and sophomore years in high school at Greenhill School in Addison, Texas before transferring to Spring Creek Academy. She was named the 2003 Dallas Area Freshman of the Year and made the All-Conference team in both 2003 and 2004. Following her high school graduation a year early in 2005, she was also named a Parade All-American.

As a youth, Washington played for the Dallas Texans, captaining the '88 Texans team to the 2006 USYSA National Championship and was named an NSCAA Youth All-American in 2003, 2004 and 2005.

=== University of North Carolina at Chapel Hill ===
Washington subsequently joined the University of North Carolina at Chapel Hill in 2006. In her first season with the Tar Heels she equaled an NCAA record for a freshman by starting all 28 matches of the season, a feat which also saw her named to the Freshman All-American team. She finished her collegiate career having scored 17 goals and with 28 assists.

In preparation for her senior year at North Carolina, Washington played for Pali Blues, scoring six goals and providing two assists. Blues head coach Charlie Naimo said of her, "Nikki brings a lot of experience at a young age. She has competed in club national championships with the Dallas Texans, won two NCAA titles at UNC and most recently captained the U.S. U20 Women's National Team to a gold medal at the FIFA U20 World Cup in Chile this past fall."

== Club career ==
=== WPS, 2010–2011 ===
On January 15, 2010, Washington was drafted 5th overall to the Los Angeles Sol in the 2010 WPS Draft despite playing only eight games during the prior collegiate season due to an anterior cruciate ligament injury. However, less than two weeks later on January 27, it was announced that the team, runner's up in the league the previous season but which had been under the administration of the Women's Professional Soccer league, were unable to find a new owner and would close. In a disposal draft of Sol players held on February 4, 2010, Washington was drafted sixth overall by Sky Blue FC. After a contractual agreement could not be made between Washington and Sky Blue, she was traded to the Saint Louis Athletica in May 2010. Just a month later, she was traded to the Chicago Red Stars after the dissolution of Saint Louis Athletica.

Prior to the start of the 2011 season, Washington was traded to the Boston Breakers. She made five appearances for the club. In June 2011, she was traded to magicJack.

=== Pali Blues and Canberra United, 2012 ===
Following the folding of the WPS, Washington re-signed for Pali Blues in the W-League for the summer of 2012. She made 11 appearances for the club and helped the team finish undefeated and in first place during the regular season. The club won the Western Conference championship after defeating the Sounders Women 1–0 on July 22 in Fullerton, California. After advancing to the W-League Final Four in Ottawa, the Blues were defeated in the final by the Ottawa Fury. Washington scored the game-opening goal in the second minute of them match.

Washington joined Australian W-League team Canberra United FC later the same year. In her five appearances for the club, she scored three goals in five games. During a match against Perth Glory on December 5, she helped Canberra win with the game-winning goal in the 53rd minute.

=== NWSL, 2013–2015 ===
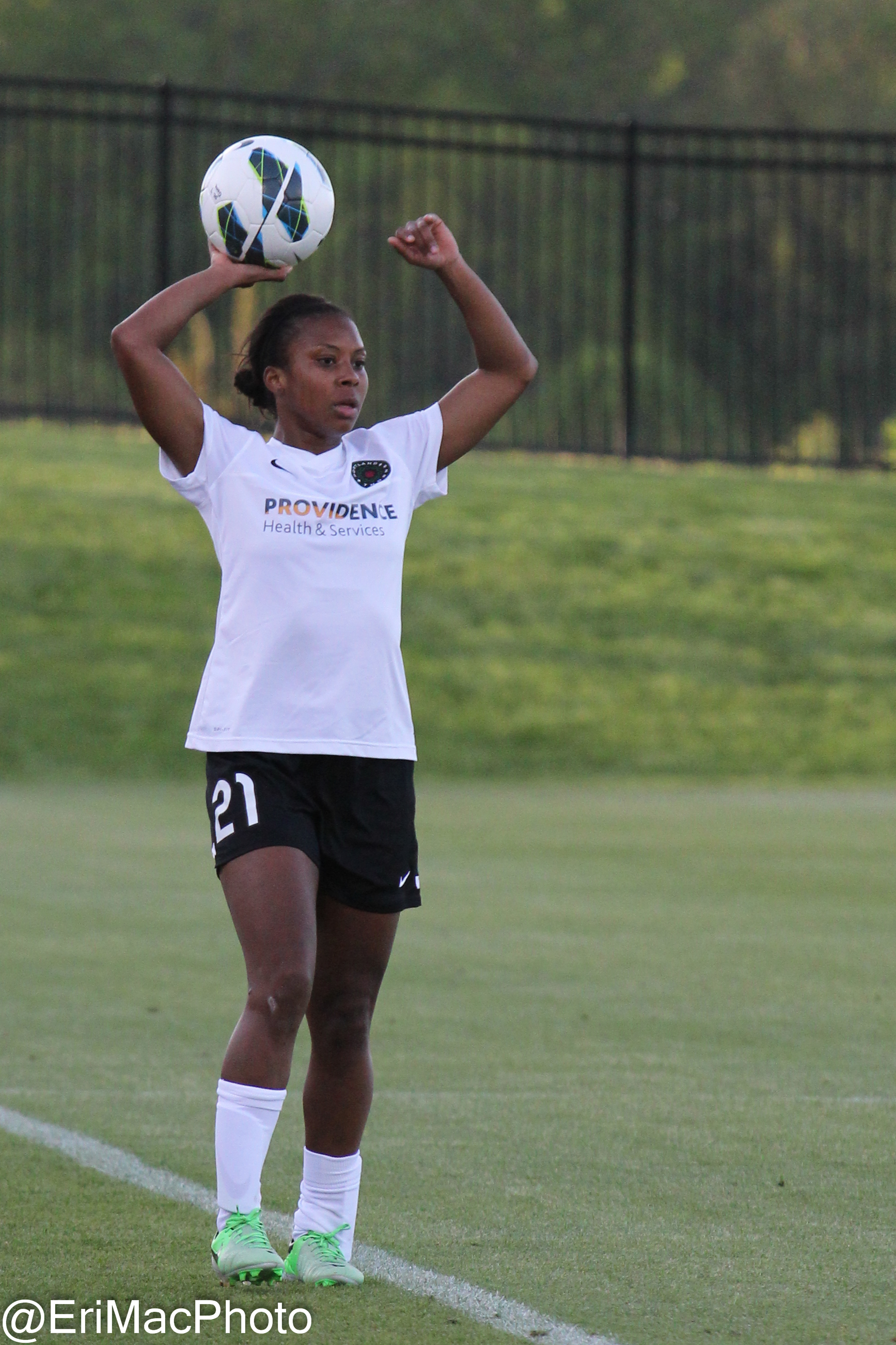
Washington playing for the Portland Thorns, 2013

In February 2013, it was announced that Washington had signed with the Portland Thorns for the inaugural season of the National Women's Soccer League. She made 11 appearances for the Thorns during the 2013 season, scoring one goal and serving two assists. After finishing third during the regular season and advancing to the playoffs, Portland captured the inaugural National Women's Soccer League championship title on August 21 after defeating regular season champions Western New York Flash 2–0 in Rochester, New York.

In January 2014, Washington was traded to expansion team Houston Dash during the 2014 NWSL College Draft. Dash head coach Randy Waldrum said, "With the trade, we were able to acquire Nikki Washington, a Texas native, who has played in both the WPS and NWSL. She too has blazing speed, and can play in multiple positions. She's an attacking force that can wreak havoc with defenses." She made three appearances for the Dash before being traded to the Boston Breakers. Washington played 15 matches and scored one goal during the 2014 season.

Washington announced her retirement from professional soccer in February 2015 ahead of the start of the 2015 season. Breakers general manager Lee Billiard said of her retirement, "We would like to thank Nikki for her contributions to the Boston Breakers and for her work within women's soccer. Nikki is a fantastic professional and someone who we will miss in Boston."

== International career ==
Washington captained the United States team that won the 2008 FIFA U-20 Women's World Cup and played 65 minutes during the final against North Korea. She was a member of the U23 National Team in 2009.

== Coaching and administration career ==
Washington co-founded a girls' soccer camp with Casey Nogueira called Camp Foot Ballas. In the summer of 2015, she joined Texas Christian University women's soccer team as the Director of Operations. She is also coach of the Dallas Texans Soccer Club. She briefly coached an 05 girls Texans team before moving to Washington.

Washington joined the University of Washington's women's soccer team as an assistant coach in 2017. In October 2020 it was announced that she had joined the NWSL's Utah Royals as an assistant coach, the second Black female coach in the NWSL.

== See also ==
- 2008 FIFA U-20 Women's World Cup squads
- List of foreign W-League (Australia) players
- List of University of North Carolina at Chapel Hill alumni
