= Tom Durkin (soccer) =

American soccer coach

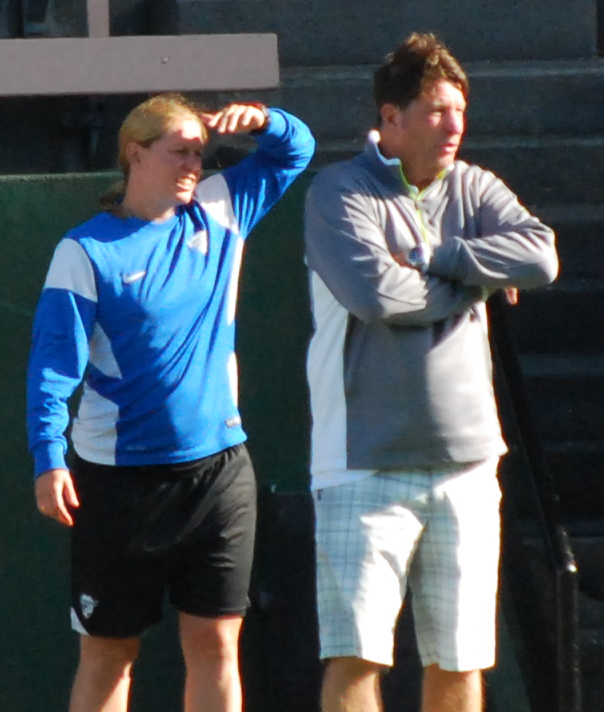
- Durkin (R) with Ashley Phillips

Managerial career
- Years: Team
- 1982–1986: Union County College
- 1986–1991: Rutgers University
- 1994–1996: Richland College
- 1995–1996: United States U–17 (assistant)
- 1996–1998: Tampa Bay Mutiny (assistant)
- 1998–2011: Bradenton Academics
- 2013: Boston Breakers (assistant)
- 2014–2015: Boston Breakers

Tom Durkin is an American soccer coach.

== Playing career ==
He played for Loyola University Maryland before playing in the amateur level, competing in state leagues and cups.

== Managerial career ==
Durkin served as head coach for FC Celtic Bolts, Bradenton Academics, Union County College, Richland College and Rutgers University. He also was an assistant manager for United States U–17 national team and the now defunct Tampa Bay Mutiny.

On September 3, 2013, he replaced Lisa Cole and interim manager Cat Whitehill as the manager of the Boston Breakers, after serving for them as an assistant for the last two matches of the 2013 National Women's Soccer League.

== Personal life ==
He graduated from Kent State University. He resides in Dover, Massachusetts with his wife Elizabeth, and their three children Joe, George and Ava.
