= Ashley Grove =

American soccer player (born 1990)

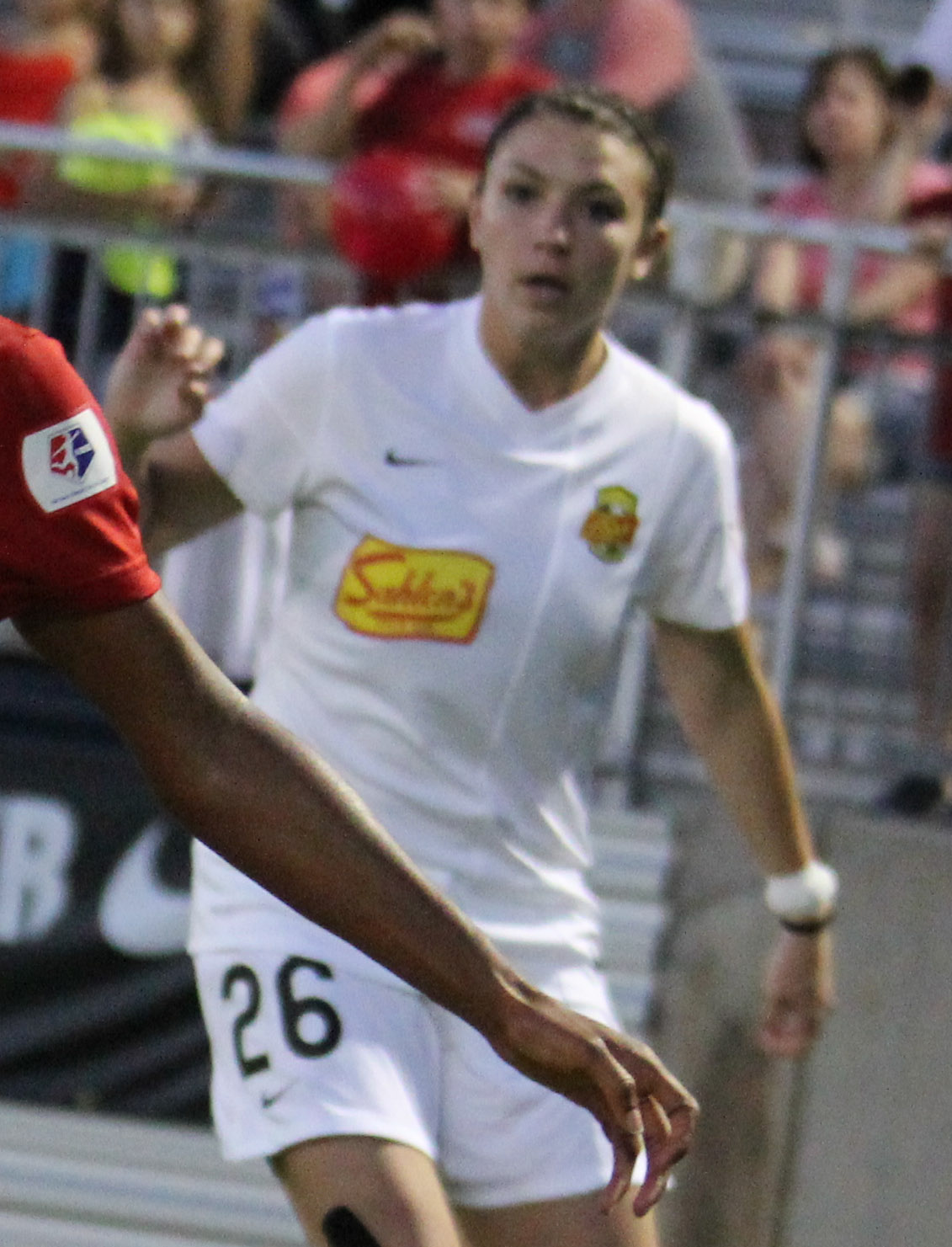

Personal information
- Full name: Ashley Marie Grove
- Date of birth: November 20, 1990 (age 35)
- Place of birth: Rochester, New York, United States
- Height: 1.70 m (5 ft 7 in)
- Position: Midfielder

College career
Years	Team	Apps	(Gls)
2008–2011	Maryland Terrapins	81	(23)

Senior career*
Years	Team	Apps	(Gls)
2011	Rochester Ravens		
2013	Western New York Flash	2	(0)
2014	Boston Breakers	9	(0)
2014–2015	Herforder SV	20	(1)
- * Club domestic league appearances and goals

Ashley Marie Grove (born November 20, 1990) is an American former soccer player. She last played as a midfielder for Herforder SV.

== Early life ==
Grove attended High School at the Aquinas Institute in Rochester, New York, where she received All-American honors for her play with their women's soccer team.

Grove went on to attend college at the University of Maryland, College Park, and featured for the Maryland Terrapins women's soccer team. Maryland would go on to appear in the NCAA Division I Women's Soccer tournament in three of her four seasons, going as far as the Round of 16 in 2009 and 2011. She finished her college career with 23 goals and 16 assists in 81 matches played.

== Club career ==
Her club career began with the amateur Rochester Ravens in the 2011 USL W-League season.

Grove was selected as the 39th overall pick in the 2013 National Women's Soccer League supplemental draft by the Western New York Flash, who played in her hometown of Rochester, New York. She was on the preseason roster for the team ahead of the inaugural NWSL season.

Having had played for the Flash's developmental squad during the spring of 2013, Grove was signed to her first professional contract with the first-team on June 14, 2013, as a way of reinforcing the squad while national team players were away. Following her signing she appeared as substitute in two matches in June, contributing minutes in a regular season that would see the club finishing in first place, winning the NWSL Shield.

She moved on to play with the Boston Breakers in 2014, part of their opening day roster, before moving to Herforder SV on September 5, 2014.

== Coaching career ==
Grove had her first stint with coaching in 2012 as an undergraduate assistant coach for her alma mater, the Maryland Terrapins. Maryland would make the second round of the 2012 NCAA DI women's soccer tournament.

Following the end of her playing career in 2016, Grove joined the women's soccer coaching staff at University at Albany, SUNY. As a member of the staff she helped the Albany Great Danes win the 2016 America East Conference women's soccer tournament.

== Honors ==
Western New York Flash

- NWSL Shield: 2013
- NWSL Championship runner-up: 2013
