= Jazmine Reeves =

American retired soccer forward (born 1992)

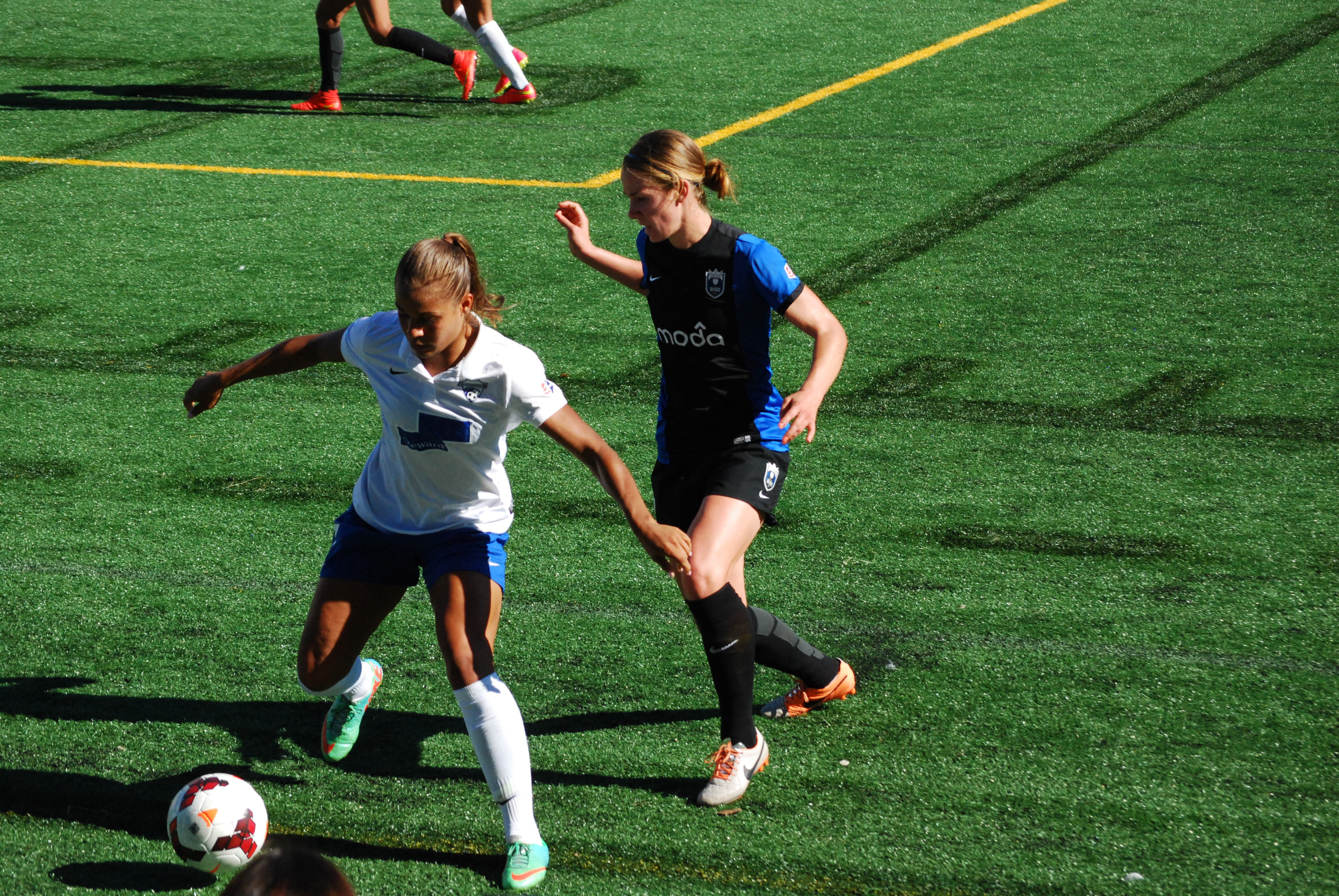
- Reeves, July 2014

Personal information
- Full name: Jazmine Dahn Reeves
- Date of birth: January 30, 1992 (age 34)
- Place of birth: San Bernardino, California
- Height: 5 ft 6 in (1.68 m)
- Position: Forward

College career
Years	Team	Apps	(Gls)
2010–2013	Virginia Tech Hokies		

Senior career*
Years	Team	Apps	(Gls)
2014	Boston Breakers	17	(7)
- * Club domestic league appearances and goals

Jazmine Dahn Reeves (born January 30, 1992) is an American retired soccer forward who played one season in the National Women's Soccer League for the Boston Breakers.

== Early life and college career ==
Born in San Bernardino, California to parents Harry and Katherine Reeves, Jazmine was raised in Dover, Delaware with her younger brother, Cody. She attended Caesar Rodney High School where she played varsity soccer for four years. Reeves was twice named Delaware Player of the Year from 2008–2009 and earned Gatorade Player of the Year honors in 2009 and 2010. During her freshman year at Caesar Rodney, her 50 goals set a state record.

Reeves was a member of the Olympic Development Program and played club soccer for the Vista Shockwave. She won the Virginia state championship with the team in 2009.

=== Virginia Tech ===
Reeves attended Virginia Tech where she played for the Hokies from 2010–2013. During her senior year, she scored 11 goals and helped the team reach the semi-finals of the NCAA College Cup. She was named first-team All-American – the first for the school's women's soccer program and was a Hermann Trophy semi-finalist. She set a new program record for appearances with 91 and recorded the second-most points in the school's history.

== Club career ==
=== Boston Breakers ===
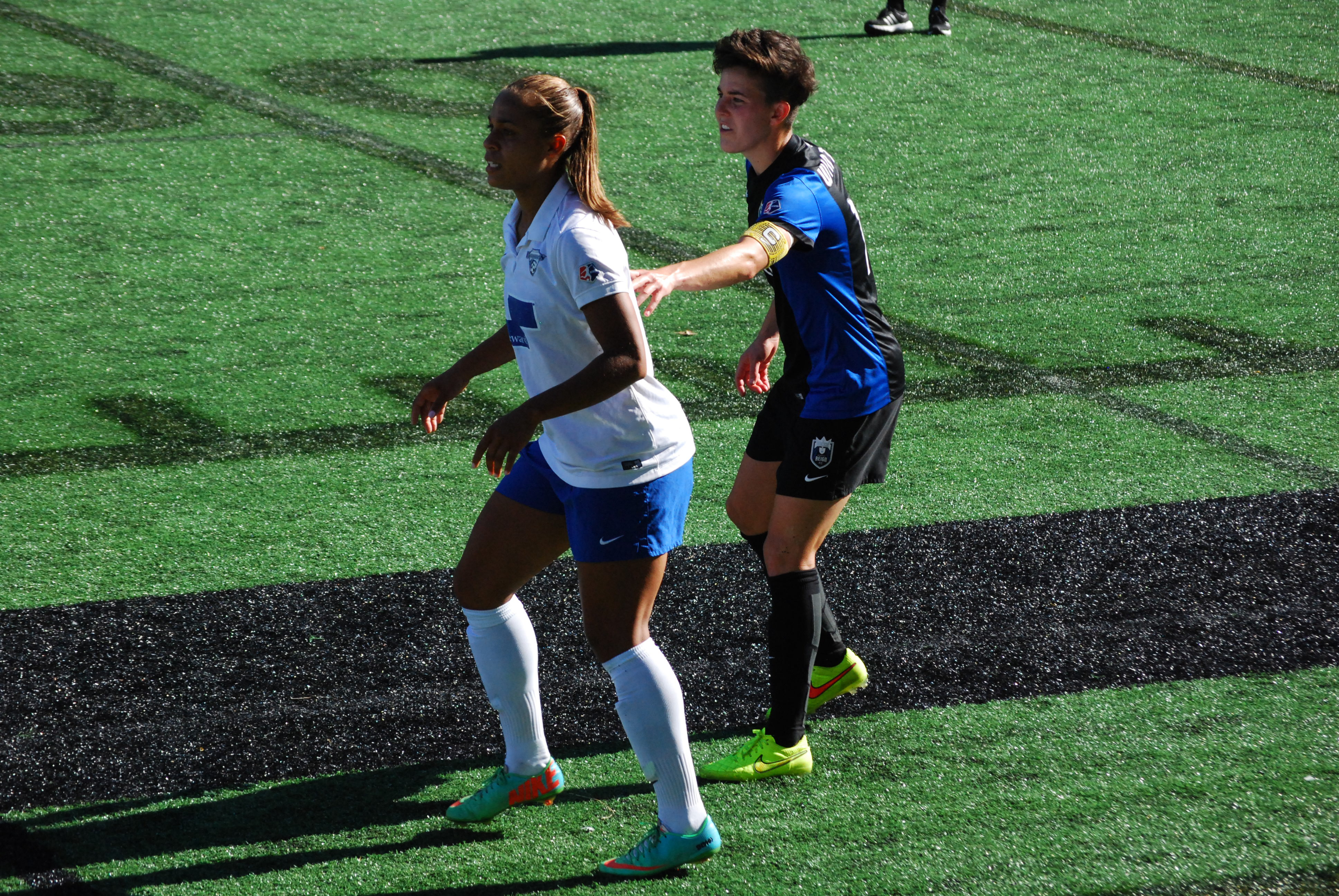
Reeves (left) plays against Keelin Winters (right) of Seattle Reign FC, July 6, 2014.

Reeves was selected by the Boston Breakers as the 21st overall draft pick in the 2014 NWSL College Draft. With the selection, she became the first professional soccer draftee from Virginia Tech. In March 2014, she was signed to the team. During a match against the Portland Thorns, Reeves scored a hat trick and helped her team defeat Portland 4–1. She was subsequently named NWSL Player of the Week for week 8 of the 2014 season.
