= Jazmyne Avant =

American soccer player (born 1990)

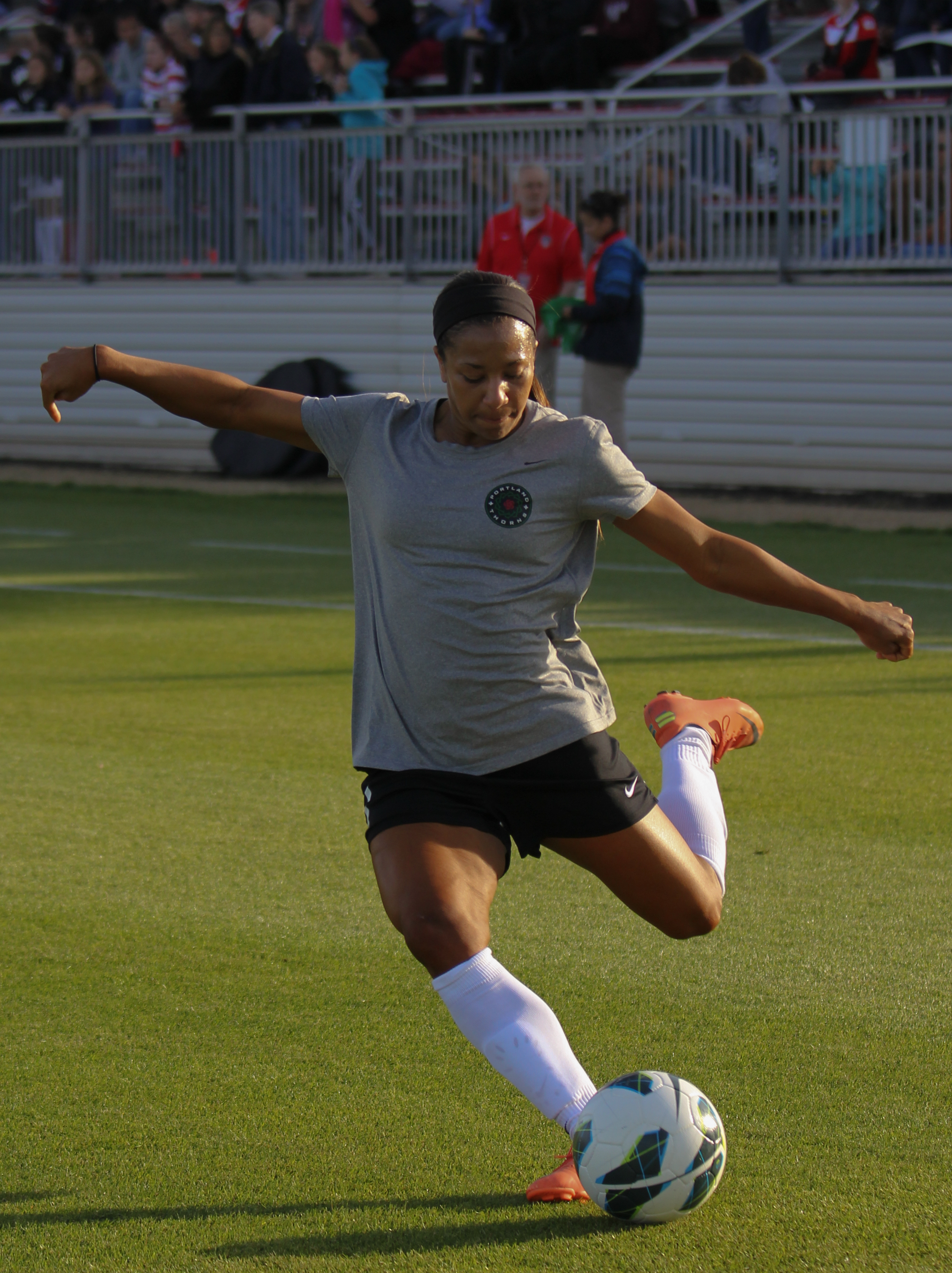
- Avant in 2013

Personal information
- Full name: Jazmyne Rey Avant
- Date of birth: January 30, 1990 (age 36)
- Place of birth: Dallas, Texas, United States
- Height: 5 ft 3 in (1.60 m)
- Position: Defender

College career
| Years | Team | Apps | (Gls) |
| 2008–2011 | Florida Gators | | |

Senior career*
| Years | Team | Apps | (Gls) |
| 2012 | New York Fury | 10 | (0) |
| 2013 | Portland Thorns | 4 | (0) |
| 2013–2014 | Boston Breakers | 23 | (0) |
| 2015 | Houston Dash | 2 | (0) |

International career
| 2006 | United States U16 | | |
| 2009 | United States U20 | | |
- * Club domestic league appearances and goals

Jazmyne Rey Avant (born January 30, 1990) is an American soccer defender who last played for the Houston Dash of the National Women's Soccer League (NWSL).

== Early life ==
=== University of Florida ===
Avant accepted an athletic scholarship to attend the University of Florida, where she played for coach Becky Burleigh's Florida Gators women's soccer team from 2008 to 2011. She was a standout defender for the Gators, playing a total of 97 matches and adding 12 assists. She was also part of the United States U20 player pool in 2009 as well as the U16's in 2006.

== Playing career ==
=== Club ===
Avant spent time with Sky Blue FC on a tour of Japan in early 2012 before signing with the New York Fury in the WPSL Elite for the 2012 season.

On February 20, 2013, Avant was signed as a discovery player for the Portland Thorns in the NWSL. She was waived in June 2013 and picked up by the Boston Breakers later that month. On July 24, 2014, Boston Breakers announced that Avant has been waived.
