= Chelsea Stewart =

Canadian soccer player

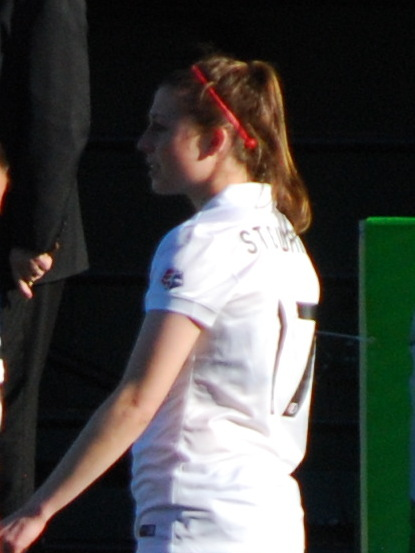

Personal information
- Full name: Chelsea Blaine Stewart
- Date of birth: April 28, 1990 (age 36)
- Place of birth: Denver, Colorado, United States
- Height: 1.65 m (5 ft 5 in)
- Positions: Defender; midfielder

Youth career
- 2004–2007: Mountain Vista High School
- 2007–2008: Shattuck-Saint Mary's

College career
| Years | Team | Apps | (Gls) |
| 2009–2010 | Vanderbilt Commodores | | |
| 2011–2013 | UCLA Bruins | | |

Senior career*
| Years | Team | Apps | (Gls) |
| 2008–2010 | Vancouver Whitecaps | 28 | (0) |
| 2014 | Boston Breakers | 10 | (0) |
| 2014 | → INAC Kobe Leonessa (loan) | 2 | (0) |
| 2015 | Western New York Flash | 3 | (0) |
| 2016 | SC Freiburg | 1 | (0) |

International career^{‡}
| 2008–2010 | Canada U-20 | 24 | (4) |
| 2009–2013 | Canada | 44 | (0) |
Medal record
Olympic Games
| Bronze medal – third place | 2012 London | Team |
- * Club domestic league appearances and goals as of October 30, 2016 ‡ National team caps and goals as of June 29, 2013

Chelsea Blaine Stewart (born April 28, 1990) is a Canadian former soccer player who played as a defender for the Canada women's national soccer team.

== Personal ==
Stewart was born in Denver, Colorado to a Canadian father and an Italian mother (from Naples). She was raised in Denver and The Pas, Manitoba, her father's homeland. She comes from a family of sport. Her father and brother both played ice hockey while her sister is also a soccer player. She was raised in Abbotsford, British Columbia.

== Youth career ==
Stewart attended Vanderbilt University her freshman year and scored 3 goals in 18 games for the Commodores. She then transferred to UCLA, and after sitting out a year because of national team commitments, scored 2 goals in 66 games for the Bruins.

== Club career ==
In January 2014, the Canadian women's national team allocated Stewart to the Boston Breakers of the National Women's Soccer League (NWSL). She signed on loan for Japanese club INAC Kobe Leonessa in October 2014. In 2015, Stewart returned to the NWSL after the Western New York Flash signed her as a Discovery Player. Stewart was waived by the Flash on July 22, 2015. Stewart signed for Bundesliga club SC Freiburg on August 8, 2016.

== International career ==
Stewart has represented Canada on the U-20 youth as well as participating in the 2011 FIFA Women's World Cup. When the Canadian team that competed in the 2012 Olympics defeated France 1–0 on August 9, 2012 in the bronze medal match, Stewart was awarded a medal since she had played in four of the matches for Canada.
