= Ashley Phillips (soccer, born 1986) =

American soccer player and coach

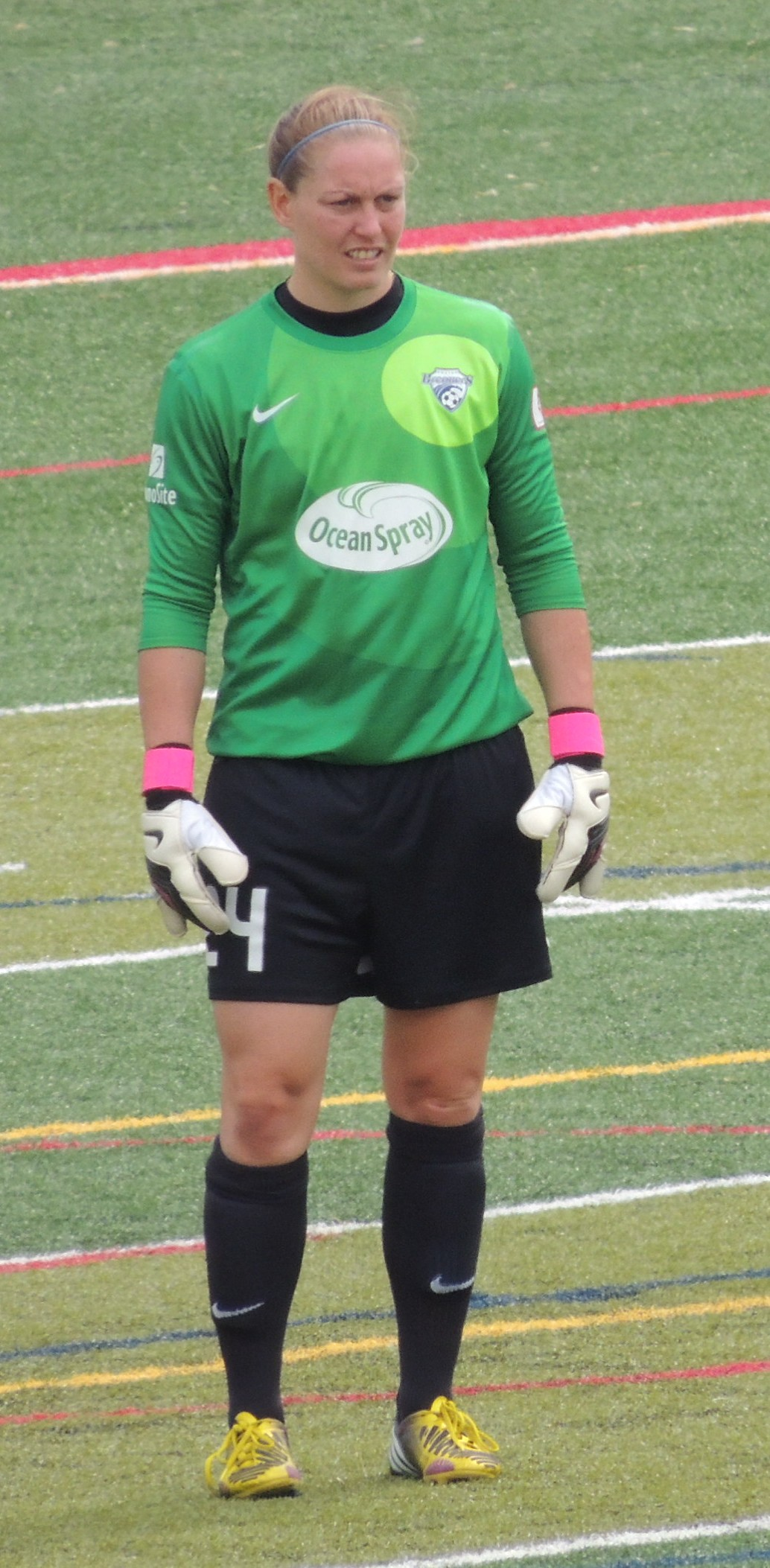
- Philips with the Chicago Red Stars in 2013

Personal information
- Full name: Ashley Rae Phillips
- Date of birth: February 21, 1986 (age 40)
- Place of birth: Beverly, Massachusetts, United States
- Height: 5 ft 8 in (1.73 m)
- Position: Goalkeeper

College career
Years	Team	Apps	(Gls)
2004–2007	Clemson Tigers		

Senior career*
Years	Team	Apps	(Gls)
2003–2004	Boston Renegades		
2008	Atlanta Silverbacks Women	6	(0)
2009–2011	Boston Breakers (WPS)	9	(0)
2013	Boston Breakers (NWSL)	11	(0)

Managerial career
- 2010–2015: Northeastern Huskies (assistant)
- 2016–: Northeastern Huskies
- * Club domestic league appearances and goals

Ashley Rae Phillips (born February 21, 1986) is an American soccer coach and former goalkeeper.

== Career ==
=== Coaching career ===
Phillips, born in Beverly, Massachusetts, is an American Woman's soccer coach. In 2010 Phillips became an assistant couch for Northeastern University soccer. In 2013 Phillips also became an assistant coach for the 2014 Boston Breakers. In 2016 Phillips was named head coach for Northeastern University.

=== Professional career ===
Phillips, was an American soccer goalkeeper for the 2009, 2010, and 2011 Boston Breakers, the Boston team of the Women's Professional Soccer and National Women's Soccer League. Phillips was a developmental player for the 2009 Boston Breakers, and the starting goalkeeper at the beginning of the 2010 and 2013 seasons.

=== College career ===
Phillips was a four-year starter at Clemson University. In her 2007 senior year, Phillips was named to the 2007 All-ACC First Team] and the 2007 Herman Trophy Watch List. Phillips holds the Clemson record for career saves of 336. In her 2006 junior year, Phillips lead Clemson to the Elite Eight of the NCAA tournament, advancing in each of the three rounds on penalty kicks, a first for both women's and men's NCAA soccer.

Phillips was named to the 2006 NSCAA All America Third Team and the All-ACC Second Team. In her 2005 sophomore year Phillips was named to the SoccerBuzz Southeast region First Team and the All-ACC Second Team. In her 2004 freshmen year underdog Clemson won their first two games of the season against Texas and Texas A&M earning Phillips a place on both the SoccerAmerica and SoccerBuzz Team of the Week.

=== Youth National Team career ===
U16 WNT, U17 WNT, U19 WNT, U21 WNT

=== Club career ===
- Boston Breakers (WPS)
- Atlanta Silverbacks (W-League)
- Boston Renegades (W-League)
- Spirit of Massachusetts (MA Premier League)
- Northeast Futbol Club (MA Premier League)

=== High school career ===
- Milton Academy
- Bishop Fenwick High School
