= 2009 Sky Blue FC season =

Sky Blue FC
2009 season
- Owner: Phil and Tammy Murphy; Thomas Hofstetter
- President & CEO: Thomas Hofstetter
- Manager: Ian Sawyers; Kelly Lindsey; Christie Rampone
- Women's Professional Soccer: 4th
- WPS Playoffs: Champions
- Top goalscorer: Natasha Kai (6)

The 2009 Sky Blue FC season was the first season for Sky Blue FC in Women's Professional Soccer (WPS). In the league's inaugural season, the club finished fourth in the regular season with 26 points, qualifying for the playoffs. After victories over the Washington Freedom and Saint Louis Athletica, Sky Blue FC defeated the Los Angeles Sol, the top team in the regular season, in the championship match to become the first WPS champions.

== Drafts ==
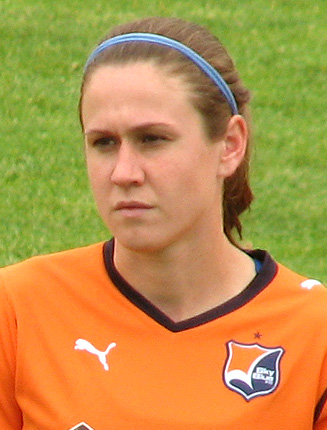
Heather O'Reilly played for Sky Blue FC in 2009.

Sky Blue FC was the WPS franchise in the New York City/New Jersey region. Players from the U.S. national team were allocated to the seven WPS clubs in September 2008; each side was allotted the rights to three national team players. The players that joined Sky Blue FC as a result of the allocation were striker Natasha Kai, Heather O'Reilly, and defender Christie Rampone; the latter two attended high school in New Jersey. Later in September, the 2008 WPS International Draft was held, allowing each club to select four international players. Sky Blue FC's first pick was Australian striker Sarah Walsh. Two players from Brazil were taken in the second and third round: Rosana and Ester. With the final selection in the International Draft, the team added Kelly Parker, a midfielder from Canada.

The 2008 WPS General Draft, in which each team was able to select four additional players to join their squads, was held the following month. Sky Blue FC had the 7th, 8th, 21st, and 22nd picks, and chose Cori Alexander, Keeley Dowling, Kacey White, and Jenny Anderson-Hammond. In January 2009, the 10-round 2009 WPS Draft was held. Midfielder Yael Averbuch, a New Jersey native, was chosen in the first round by Sky Blue FC.

== Regular season ==
=== April–May ===
The team had multiple locations for home games in its inaugural season. Their first two home games were held in Bridgewater Township, New Jersey, at TD Bank Ballpark. For the remainder of the year, Sky Blue FC's home field was Yurcak Field, on the campus of Rutgers University. Ian Sawyers, who had won a championship as a coach in the Women's United Soccer Association in 2001, was named the head coach.

Sky Blue FC began their first WPS campaign on April 5, in a match against the Los Angeles Sol at TD Bank Ballpark. A first-half brace by Marta led the Sol to a 2–0 win. Six days later, Sky Blue FC hosted FC Gold Pride. Rampone, the team's regular captain, missed the match due to an injury. In the 76th minute, O'Reilly scored on a strike with her right foot for the club's first-ever goal, which was enough for a 1–1 draw. Following that match, which was their last at TD Bank Ballpark, Sky Blue FC embarked on a five-match stretch on the road. Against the Chicago Red Stars on April 19, goalkeepers Karen Bardsley and Jenni Branam combined for six saves in a scoreless draw. Collette McCallum had a scoring opportunity for Sky Blue FC in the first half, but her effort went off the crossbar.

After an exhibition against F.C. Indiana and an off week, Sky Blue FC's next WPS game was at FC Gold Pride on May 3. An 86th-minute goal by FC Gold Pride substitute Leigh Ann Robinson was the only score in a 1–0 Sky Blue FC loss. The team then traveled to Toyota Park for a match against the Red Stars, who were undefeated with two wins and two draws. In the eighth minute, Walsh received a pass from McCallum and scored to give Sky Blue FC the lead. After they allowed no shots on goal in the opening 45 minutes, Kai doubled their advantage in the 79th minute; Sky Blue FC held on by that two-goal margin for their first victory of the season. They next played at the Home Depot Center in Los Angeles against the Sol, losing 1–0 on an 80th-minute goal by Marta.

Sky Blue FC's next game, at the Washington Freedom, was played at Robert F. Kennedy Memorial Stadium. Before the match, Sawyers was suspended from his duties with the club; team president Thomas Hofstetter said in a statement that "Differences have arisen between Ian and the ownership of the organization." Kelly Lindsey, an assistant under Sawyers, served as Sky Blue FC's interim head coach against the Freedom. Goals by the Freedom's Cat Whitehill and Lisa De Vanna in the first half led to a two-goal deficit for Sky Blue FC at halftime. Despite a 66th-minute Rosana goal, they were unable to avoid defeat. The loss left Sky Blue FC at the bottom of the WPS standings, with only five points from seven matches played. Sawyers was subsequently fired by the team, and Lindsey continued as the interim head coach. Vice president of sales and marketing Gerry Marrone was promoted to general manager, a position that had also been held by Sawyers.

Following their road trip, the club hosted the Boston Breakers in the first home game played at Yurcak Field. Kai opened the scoring for Sky Blue FC in the fourth minute, before the Breakers' Kelly Smith equalized eight minutes later. In the 29th minute, Sky Blue regained the lead with a Kacey White goal; they ended up winning 2–1 for their second victory.

=== June–August ===
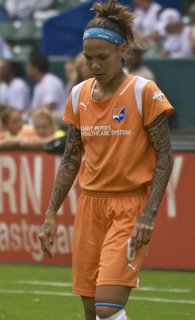
Natasha Kai had a team-high six goals in 2009.

On June 7, Sky Blue FC played at Saint Louis Athletica. Although Sky Blue FC had a 14–10 advantage in shot attempts, they did not score against Athletica goalkeeper Hope Solo. A first-half strike by Amanda Cinalli gave Athletica an eventual 1–0 win, and left Sky Blue FC in last place.

After a 0–0 draw at home against Los Angeles, Sky Blue FC defeated the Red Stars 1–0 on a 24th-minute Rosana goal. The win lifted them to fifth in the WPS standings. Lindsey was named the team's coach for their remaining 2009 games on June 19. Sky Blue FC traded Walsh to Saint Louis Athletica for forward Kerri Hanks and midfielder Francielle on June 26; the clubs also exchanged draft picks. They then lost 2–1 at home to Saint Louis Athletica two days later, as Elise Weber scored the winning goal in the 84th minute. Against the Breakers the following week, O'Reilly's sixth-minute goal was the only scoring as Sky Blue FC won their fourth match of the season.

In another match against the Breakers on July 12, a Kai goal gave Sky Blue FC the lead in the first half before Rosana made the score 2–0 in the 37th minute. Despite a late Jennifer Nobis goal for Boston, Sky Blue FC held on for a 2–1 win to move up to fourth place in the WPS standings on 18 points. Three days later, the club hosted the Freedom in a back-and-forth match. Kai and White each had two goals for Sky Blue FC, while De Vanna tallied twice for Washington. Sky Blue FC held a 4–3 lead in second-half stoppage time when Whitehill scored off a rebound to level the match; the 4–4 draw marked the first time that eight goals had been scored in a WPS game. Four days later, Hanks scored in the 91st minute to give Sky Blue FC a victory against Chicago.

Sky Blue FC were held without a goal in their next two games, which resulted in one loss and one draw. Those results left the team with a 6–7–5 record; they were undefeated when playing Boston and Chicago, but winless against the other four WPS clubs. On July 29, Lindsey resigned as head coach of the team, along with assistant coach Joe Dorini. The club named Rampone as their third head coach of the year; she served as a caretaker player-coach for the rest of the season. On August 5, Rampone's side defeated FC Gold Pride 2–0 behind second-half goals by Rosana and Kai; the win left Sky Blue FC in position to qualify for the WPS playoffs, which the top four teams would contest, with one match remaining in the regular season. With 26 points, they were level with third-place Washington, their opponents in the finale, and one point ahead of fifth-place Boston. Although Sky Blue FC were defeated 3–1 by the Freedom, the Breakers lost to Los Angeles in their final game, giving Sky Blue FC the fourth and final postseason berth. They ended up with seven wins, eight losses, and five draws in the regular season.

== Playoffs ==
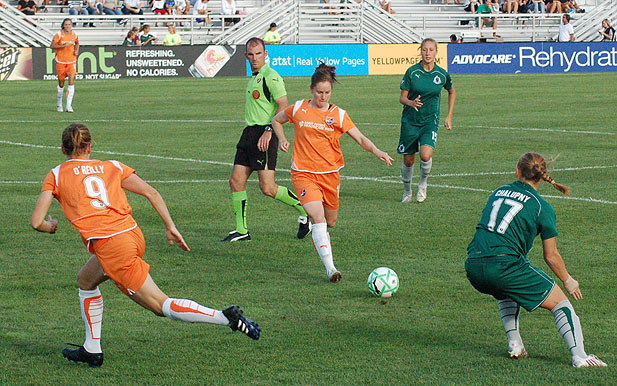
Sky Blue FC defeated Saint Louis Athletica to reach the WPS final.

The WPS playoffs were structured so that the top seed, the Sol, were given an automatic berth in the league final. The third- and fourth-place teams, the Freedom and Sky Blue FC respectively, faced each other in the opening round. The winner would move on to face the number two team in the standings, Saint Louis Athletica, in the Super Semifinal. Underdogs entering the first-round match, Sky Blue FC were without the services of Bardsley and Anita Asante, who were with the England national team at the UEFA Women's Euro 2009. Their opponents, who were missing French midfielder Sonia Bompastor because of international duty, featured Abby Wambach, who scored a team-high eight goals during the regular season. In the match, which took place on August 15 at Maryland SoccerPlex, Sky Blue FC outshot Washington 14–5 in the first half, but neither team scored. Kai, a second-half substitute, broke the deadlock in the 55th minute, beating Freedom goalkeeper Erin McLeod. De Vanna leveled the match in the 78th minute, but six minutes later Francielle restored Sky Blue FC's lead with a 20-yard strike that proved to be the decisive goal.

With the victory, Sky Blue FC advanced to face Saint Louis Athletica in the next round, a club they had lost to in each of their three regular season meetings. The match was held on August 19 in Fenton, Missouri. Sky Blue FC had numerous early scoring opportunities, but were denied by saves from Solo. Dowling, however, received a pass from Averbuch and beat Solo with a shot from her left foot in the 30th minute. The goal, which was the first of Dowling's professional career, was the only one of the match, as Sky Blue FC earned a place in the first WPS title match against Los Angeles.

Three days after the semifinal contest, Sky Blue FC played Los Angeles in the WPS championship match. It was the club's third match in an eight-day span; each took place in a different time zone. The Sol entered the match as heavy favorites, as analysts questioned whether their opponents would suffer from fatigue. In front of 7,218 fans at the Home Depot Center, Sky Blue FC effectively held possession against the Sol, and had control of the match for much of the opening half. They took the lead in the 16th minute, as a cross by Dowling found Kai, who passed to O'Reilly. Her shot found the net for the first goal of the match. In the 27th minute, Kai gained possession of the ball in the Sky Blue FC half of the field and ran until she was near the opposition's box, where Los Angeles defender Allison Falk brought her down from behind. The foul resulted in a red card that forced her team to field only 10 players for around two-thirds of the match. The Sol's performance improved as the match progressed, but Braham repelled multiple second-half shots. Marta had an opportunity to level the match with a free kick in second-half stoppage time, but her shot from 28 yards went over the Sky Blue FC goal. Sky Blue FC held on for a 1–0 victory, becoming the inaugural WPS champions.

== Statistical summary ==
Sky Blue FC scored 19 goals and conceded 20 during the regular season; both totals were tied for third in the league. Kai led the team in regular season goals with six. Rosana was the next highest-scorer with five goals. Three players—Dowling, McCallum, and O'Reilly—each had three assists in regular season play. In goal, Branam started 16 of the 20 regular season games and appeared in two others. She had 6 shutouts and a 1.09 goals against average.

== Aftermath ==
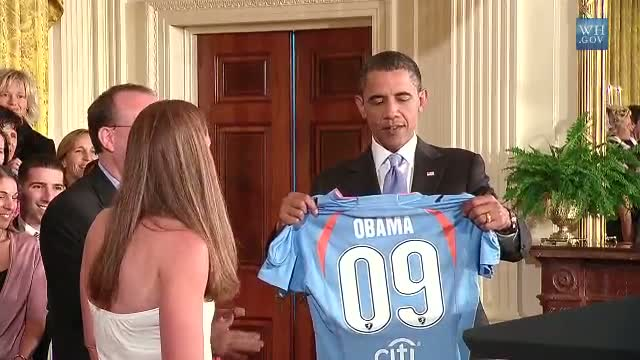
Sky Blue FC visited the White House after their championship season.

The WPS season concluded with the 2009 WPS All-Star Game, which pitted a team of WPS All-Stars against Umeå IK of Sweden, the reigning Damallsvenskan champions. No Sky Blue FC players were initially chosen to start in the All-Star Game, but Rampone was picked as one of the replacements for European players participating at the UEFA Women's Euro 2009. O'Reilly was among the reserves for the team, which defeated Umeå IK 4–2. Rampone was named the winner of the WPS Sportswoman of the Year Award. Asante was nominated for Defender of the Year, while Branam received a Goalkeeper of the Year nomination.

Following the season, Sky Blue FC named Pauliina Miettinen as their head coach for 2010. The club signed U.S. national team player Carli Lloyd and Dutch international Daphne Koster. In 2010, the team finished 7–10–7 and did not qualify for the postseason.
