= List of Gotham FC players =

This list comprises all players who have been placed on a regular-season roster for NJ/NY Gotham FC (formerly Sky Blue FC) since the team's first Women's Professional Soccer season in 2009. This list does not include pre-season training rosters, short term players, or discovery players who do not appear for the club.

== All-time statistics ==
Name	Nationality	Position	Sky Blue FC career	Appearances	Starts	Minutes	Goals	Assists
Cori Alexander	United States	GK	2009	0	0	0	0	0
Anita Asante	England	DF	2009–	16	16	1440	0	0
Yael Averbuch	United States	MF	2009–	21	17	1472	0	2
Karen Bardsley	England	GK	2009–	4	4	315	0	0
Jenni Branam	United States	GK	2009–	21	19	1755	0	0
Jen Buczkowski	United States	MF	2009	19	11	1130	0	0
Keeley Dowling	United States	DF	2009–	22	21	1953	1	3
Francielle	Brazil	MF	2009–	4	1	166	1	0
Mele French	United States	FW	2009	1	0	11	0	0
Jenny Hammond	United States	DF	2009	0	0	0	0	0
Kerri Hanks	United States	FW	2009–	9	3	294	1	0
Katie Hooker	United States	FW	2009	2	2	179	0	0
Natasha Kai	United States	FW	2009–	21	17	1550	7	2
Noelle Keselica	United States	FW	2009	6	0	108	0	0
Collette McCallum	Australia	MF	2009	23	17	1553	0	3
Heather O'Reilly	United States	FW	2009–	20	20	1766	3	3
Kelly Parker	Canada	MF	2009	19	12	1121	0	1
Christie Rampone	United States	DF	2009–	17	17	1449	0	0
Rosana	Brazil	MF	2009–	20	18	1368	5	1
Meghan Schnur	United States	MF	2009–	23	23	2021	0	2
Lauren Sesselmann	United States	FW	2009	1	0	1	0	0
Christie Shaner	United States	DF	2009	2	0	43	0	0
Julianne Sitch	United States	DF	2009	16	11	996	1	0
Sarah Walsh	Australia	FW	2009	5	4	351	1	1
Kacey White	United States	MF	2009	22	19	1654	3	1

== Regular season statistics ==
Name	Nationality	Position	Sky Blue FC career	Appearances	Starts	Minutes	Goals	Assists
Cori Alexander	United States	GK	2009	0	0	0	0	0
Anita Asante	England	DF	2009–	16	16	1440	0	0
Yael Averbuch	United States	MF	2009–	18	14	1202	0	0
Karen Bardsley	England	GK	2009–	4	4	315	0	0
Jenni Branam	United States	GK	2009–	18	16	1485	0	0
Jen Buczkowski	United States	MF	2009	16	8	860	0	0
Keeley Dowling	United States	DF	2009–	19	18	1683	0	3
Francielle	Brazil	MF	2009–	1	0	29	0	0
Mele French	United States	FW	2009	1	0	11	0	0
Jenny Hammond	United States	DF	2009	0	0	0	0	0
Kerri Hanks	United States	FW	2009–	6	1	172	1	0
Katie Hooker	United States	FW	2009	2	2	179	0	0
Natasha Kai	United States	FW	2009–	18	16	1402	6	1
Noelle Keselica	United States	FW	2009	5	0	101	0	0
Collette McCallum	Australia	MF	2009	20	15	1401	0	3
Heather O'Reilly	United States	FW	2009–	17	17	1530	2	3
Kelly Parker	Canada	MF	2009	17	12	1075	0	1
Christie Rampone	United States	DF	2009–	14	14	1179	0	0
Rosana	Brazil	MF	2009–	17	15	1117	5	1
Meghan Schnur	United States	MF	2009–	20	20	1751	0	2
Lauren Sesselmann	United States	FW	2009	1	0	1	0	0
Christie Shaner	United States	DF	2009	2	0	43	0	0
Julianne Sitch	United States	DF	2009	16	11	996	1	0
Sarah Walsh	Australia	FW	2009	5	4	351	1	1
Kacey White	United States	MF	2009	19	16	1403	3	0

== Playoff statistics ==
Name	Nationality	Position	Appearances	Starts	Minutes	Goals	Assists
Yael Averbuch	United States	MF	3	3	270	0	2
Jenni Branam	United States	GK	3	3	270	0	0
Jen Buczkowski	United States	MF	3	3	270	0	0
Keeley Dowling	United States	DF	3	3	270	1	0
Francielle	Brazil	MF	3	1	137	1	0
Kerri Hanks	United States	FW	3	2	122	0	0
Natasha Kai	United States	FW	3	1	148	1	1
Noelle Keselica	United States	FW	1	0	7	0	0
Collette McCallum	Australia	MF	3	2	152	0	0
Heather O'Reilly	United States	FW	3	3	236	1	0
Kelly Parker	Canada	MF	2	0	46	0	0
Christie Rampone	United States	DF	3	3	270	0	0
Rosana	Brazil	MF	3	3	251	0	0
Meghan Schnur	United States	MF	3	3	270	0	0
Kacey White	United States	MF	3	3	251	0	1

== Key to positions ==
GK	Goalkeeper	DF	Defender	RB	Right back	SW	Sweeper
CB	Centre back	LB	Left back	MF	Midfielder	W	Winger
RW	Right winger	CM	Central midfielder	DM	Defensive midfielder	AM	Attacking midfielder
LW	Left winger	FW	Forward	SS	Second striker	CF	Centre forward
