= 2010 Sky Blue FC season =

American soccer season

Sky Blue FC
2010 season
- Owner: Phil and Tammy Murphy; Thomas Hofstetter
- President & CEO: Thomas Hofstetter
- Head coach: Pauliina Miettinen (until July 20); Rick Stainton (after July 20)
- Stadium: Yurcak Field
- WPS: 5th
- WPS Playoffs: DNQ
- Top goalscorer: Laura Kalmari (5); Natasha Kai (5)
- Highest home attendance: 4,440 (April 10 vs. CHI)
- Lowest home attendance: 2,491 (Aug. 11 vs. WAS)
- Average home league attendance: 3,320
- Biggest win: 2–0 (June 27 vs. BAY)
- Biggest defeat: 0–4 (Aug. 15 vs. BOS)
Home colours

The 2010 Sky Blue FC season was the team's second season as a professional women's soccer team, competing in Women's Professional Soccer (WPS), then the top-division tier of women's soccer in the United States.

== Background ==
Following its inaugural season championship victory, Sky Blue FC hired Finnish manager Pauliina Miettinen as head coach on September 30, 2009. She retained Mike Lyons from the 2009 staff as an assistant and brought in Anne Parnila and Rick Stainton as additional assistants.

Expectations for Sky Blue FC were high, with Soccer America favoring the team to repeat as champions.

Team captain and 2009 player-manager Christie Rampone was expected to miss part of the season while pregnant with her second child. Defender Anita Asante also missed the beginning of the season while recovering from an anterior cruciate ligament injury and 2009 starting goalkeeper Jenni Branam missed the first two months of the season with a broken patella suffered during a preseason match.

== Facilities ==
Sky Blue FC played its home matches at Yurcak Field, part of Rutgers University, and trained at Rutgers Preparatory School in Somerset, New Jersey.

== Squad ==
As of August 8, 2010

No.	Pos.	Ntn.	Name
13	MF	USA	Yael Averbuch
1	GK	ENG	Karen Bardsley
23	GK	USA	Jenni Branam
17	DF	USA	Keeley Dowling
6	FW	USA	Natasha Kai
9	MF	USA	Heather O'Reilly
3	DF	USA	Christie Rampone
11	DF	BRA	Rosana
7	DF	USA	Meghan Schnur
8	MF	USA	Kacey White
21	FW	FIN	Laura Kalmari
20	FW/MF	USA	India Trotter
4	DF	NED	Daphne Koster
10	MF	USA	Carli Lloyd
14	DF	USA	Brittany Taylor
22	FW	USA	Katie Schoepfer
26	MF	USA	Angela Salem
15	DF	USA	Danielle Johnson
2	DF/MF	USA	Kiersten Dallstream
5	DF/MF	USA	Kendall Fletcher
0	GK	USA	Shannon Myers
96	FW	ITA	Patrizia Panico
—	GK	USA	Meghann Burke
Players exiting mid-season
5	DF	ENG	Anita Asante
—	FW	SWE	Jessica Landström
—		USA	Ashley Thompson
—		USA	Meagan Snell
18	GK	USA	Kristin Luckenbill

=== Technical staff ===
As of July 20, 2010

Position	Name
General manager	(United States) Gerry Marrone
Head coach	(Finland) Pauliina Miettinen (until July 20)
Head coach	(United States) Rick Stainton (after July 20)
Assistant coaches	(United States) Mike Lyons
Assistant coaches	(Finland) Anne Parnila (until July 20)
Goalkeeping coach	(United States) Rick Stainton (until July 20)

== Transactions ==
=== WPS Draft ===
Sky Blue FC entered the 2010 WPS Draft with the 6th, 26th, 29th, 35th, 44th, 53rd, and 62nd picks. Sky Blue FC traded the 62nd pick to Philadelphia Independence in exchange for the rights to Jen Anzivino, which Philadelphia had picked with the 49th-overall selection. Melissa Clarke, selected by Sky Blue 29th overall, would instead sign with NiceFutis in Finland's Kansallinen Liiga.

Round	Pick	Pos.	Player	College	Ref.
1	6	DF	(United States) Brittany Taylor	University of Connecticut	
3	26	FW	(United States) Katie Schoepfer	Pennsylvania State University	
3	29	MF	(United States) Melissa Clarke	Louisiana State University	
4	35	DF	(United States) Danielle Johnson	University of Mississippi	
5	44	FW	(United States) Meagan Snell	Santa Clara University	
5	49	DF	(United States) Jen Anzivino	Rutgers University	
6	53	MF	(United States) Kelly Isleib	University of Utah	

=== Los Angeles Sol dispersal draft ===
On January 28, 2010, the Los Angeles Sol disbanded. The league scheduled a dispersal draft for the Sol's players on February 4, 2010. Sky Blue FC had the 6th, 11th, and 22nd picks in the dispersal draft.

Round	Pick	Pos.	Player	Ref.
1	6	FW	(United States) Nikki Washington	
2	11	DF	(United States) Kiersten Dallstream	
3	22	Pass		

=== Transfers in ===
Date	Pos.	Player	Former team	Fee/notes	Ref.
October 21, 2009	MF	(United States) Carli Lloyd	(United States) Chicago Red Stars	Free-agent signing.	
May 6, 2010	FW/MF	(United States) India Trotter	(United States) Saint Louis Athletica	Acquired with St. Louis's first-round pick in the 2011 WPS Draft, in exchange for Anita Asante and the rights to Nikki Washington.	
August 2010	GK	(United States) Meghann Burke	(United States) Chicago Red Stars	Free-agent signing.	

=== Transfers out ===
Date	Pos.	Player	Destination team	Fee/notes	Ref.
May 6, 2010	DF	(England) Anita Asante	(United States) St. Louis Athletica	Traded with the rights to Nikki Washington in exchange for India Trotter and St. Louis's first-round pick in the 2011 WPS Draft, which had been held by Los Angeles Sol prior to its dissolution.	

== Regular season ==
=== April–May: Injuries, absences, Bardsley's excellence ===
Sky Blue FC opened the season with two victories in April, both against Chicago Red Stars, and a loss against FC Gold Pride. Newly acquired midfielder Carli Lloyd broke her ankle, and Sky Blue placed Lloyd on the team's 30-day injured reserve. The team also struggled with absences from defender Meghan Schnur with a knee injury, and from Natasha Kai with a hamstring strain.

Goalkeeper Karen Bardsley was named Player of the Week for week 5 and Player of the Month for May, amassing 31 saves and two shutouts over four matches in the month.

=== June–July: Firing the coach ===
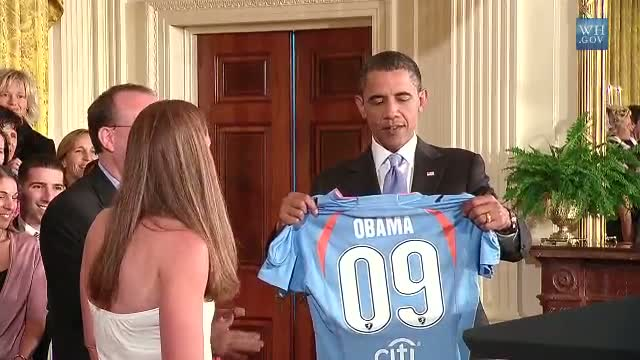
Sky Blue FC players presented United States President Barack Obama with a jersey during a July 1 visit to the White House.

On June 27, Sky Blue recorded its largest win of the season by defeating first-place FC Gold Pride on the road 2–0. However, the win was a rare bright spot in the mid-season months. Sky Blue fell three times to the expansion Philadelphia Independence, conceding 10 goals against three goals scored in three matches.

Goalkeeper Karen Bardsley was named to the starting WPS All-Star team, and three Sky Blue FC players — Natasha Kai, Laura Kalmari, and Christie Rampone — were named to the 2010 WPS All-Star Game reserves from which the two all-star teams would be selected. Kai and Kalmari were selected by the Abby Wambach-captained team, and Rampone was selected by the Marta-captained team.

However, Sky Blue's misfortunes with injuries continued. During an All-Star training session in July, Bardsley injured her clavicle while leading the league with five shutouts and a 0.90 goals-against average. Third keeper Kristin Luckenbill took over duties until Jenni Branam recovered from injury, then retired from soccer.

Sky Blue FC were invited to the White House to celebrate their 2009 championship with President Barack Obama on July 1.

Sky Blue struggled to score goals, and by July 19, general manager Gerry Marrone fired head coach Pauliina Miettinen and assistant coach Anne Parnila, and appointed goalkeeping coach Rick Stainton as head coach.

=== August–September: Stoppage-time collapse ===
Starting goalkeeper Jenni Branam returned from injury on August 1 to make four saves in a loss to Chicago Red Stars. However, she soon suffered another injury, forcing Sky Blue to play its fourth keeper Meghann Burke, signed in August as a free-agent. Burke would hold the job until the end of the season.

Needing a win against first-place FC Gold Pride on September 1 to secure the final playoff bid, Sky Blue FC took the lead on a 72nd-minute goal by Natasha Kai. However, a misplayed free kick by Sky Blue's defense in second-half stoppage time resulted in an equalizer by Gold Pride's Becky Edwards. Sky Blue would not score another goal in its final two matches, ended the season with three draws, and finished three points out of fourth place to miss the playoffs.

== Playoffs ==
Sky Blue FC did not qualify for the playoffs and were unable to defend their 2009 title.

== Matches ==
Match details from the WPS schedule or match reports, unless otherwise noted.

=== Regular season ===
April 11, 2010 1	Sky Blue FC	1–0	Chicago Red Stars	Piscataway, New Jersey
6:00 p.m. EDT (UTC-4)	Kai 6' (O'Reilly)	Box score Report		Stadium: Yurcak Field; Attendance: 4,440; Referee: Ted Unkel; Assistant referees: John Schmitz, Brian Dunn; Fourth official: Richard Sanchez
Note: Broadcast on Fox Soccer Channel

April 17, 2010 2	FC Gold Pride	3–1	Sky Blue FC	Castro Valley, California
7:00 p.m. PDT (UTC-7)	Sinclair 11', 75' (O'Hara); Marta 82' (O'Hara)	Box score Report	Kalmari 50' (Landström)	Stadium: Castro Valley Athletic Stadium; Attendance: 3,757; Referee: Felisha Marsical; Assistant referees: Marlene Duffy, Colin Arblaster; Fourth official: Maurizio Laudani

April 25, 2010 3	Chicago Red Stars	0–1	Sky Blue FC	Bridgeview, Illinois
6:00 p.m. EDT (UTC-4)		Box score Report	Lloyd (yellow card) 18'; Kai 52' (White)	Stadium: Toyota Park; Attendance: 3,136; Referee: Margaret Domka; Assistant referees: Kristen Schiereck, Ian Gut; Fourth official: Jorge Cuate

May 1, 2010 4	Sky Blue FC	0–1	FC Gold Pride	Piscataway, New Jersey
6:00 p.m. EDT (UTC-4)		Box score	Edwards (yellow card) 26'; Sinclair 38' (Dew); O'Hara (yellow card) 84'	Stadium: Yurcak Field; Attendance: 3,798; Referee: Stephanie Toth; Assistant referees: Bryan Roslund, Michael Donovan; Fourth official: Jose Carlos Rivero
Note: Broadcast on Fox Soccer Channel

May 9, 2010 5	Atlanta Beat	0–1	Sky Blue FC	Kennesaw, Georgia
7:00 p.m. EDT (UTC-4)		Box score	Robinson 50' (o.g.)	Stadium: KSU Soccer Stadium; Attendance: 7,248; Referee: Moo Hackett; Assistant referees: Melanie Johnson, Patrick Baker; Fourth official: Tony Russo
Note: Broadcast on Fox Soccer Channel

May 16, 2010 6	Saint Louis Athletica	2–2	Sky Blue FC	Fenton, Missouri
4:00 p.m. CDT (UTC-5)	Kalmari 57' (Dallstream), 61' (O'Reilly) (yellow card) 82'	Box score	Boxx 8' (pen.); Aluko (yellow card) 73' (goal) 85' (Boxx)	Stadium: Anheuser-Busch Soccer Park; Attendance: 2,346; Referee: Margaret Domka; Assistant referees: Mandy Love, Ann Mayberry; Fourth official: Mark Boyko

May 29, 2010 7	Sky Blue FC	0–0	Boston Breakers	Piscataway, New Jersey
7:00 p.m. EDT (UTC-4)		Box score		Stadium: Yurcak Field; Attendance: 3,418; Referee: Donald Dellavia; Assistant referees: Debbie Coleman, Mark Allatin; Fourth official: Mark Boyko

June 6, 2010 8	Philadelphia Independence	2–1	Sky Blue FC	West Chester, Pennsylvania
6:00 p.m. EDT (UTC-4)	Lindsey 2' (Rodriguez); Rodriguez 28' (Sanderson)	Box score	Kalmari 10' (Rosana)	Stadium: John A. Farrell Stadium; Attendance: 2,585; Referee: Dallas Malhiwsky; Assistant referees: Amy Willing, Stanford Nagle III; Fourth official: Ross Kleinstuber

June 13, 2010 9	Boston Breakers	1–2	Sky Blue FC	Boston, Massachusetts
4:00 p.m. EDT (UTC-4)	Angeli 14'	Box score	O'Reilly 52'; Koster (yellow card) 75'; Rosana 90+' (pen.)	Stadium: Harvard Stadium; Attendance: 4,687; Referee: Michael Donoval; Assistant referees: Marlene Duffy, Russell Wolf; Fourth official: Kellee Walsh

June 19, 2010 10	Sky Blue FC	1–4	Philadelphia Independence	Piscataway, New Jersey
7:00 p.m. EDT (UTC-4)	Rosana 27' (pen.); O'Reilly (yellow card) 75'	Box score	Adams 4' (Rodriguez); Rodriguez 17' (Adams); Lohman 55'; DiMartino 74' (Lindsey)	Stadium: Yurcak Field; Attendance: 3,362; Referee: Daniel Fitzgerald; Assistant referees: Amy Mahan, Emilie Buse

June 27, 2010 11	FC Gold Pride	0–2	Sky Blue FC	Hayward, California
6:00 p.m. EDT (UTC-4)	Marta (yellow card) 90+'	Box score Report	Rosana 58' (O'Reilly); Kai 88' (Landström)	Stadium: Pioneer Stadium; Attendance: 2,478; Referee: Felisha Mariscal; Assistant referees: Veronica Perez, Marlene Duffy; Fourth official: Vicente Cortes

July 7, 2010 12	Sky Blue FC	0–0	Washington Freedom	Boyds, Maryland
5:00 p.m. EDT (UTC-4)	Koster (yellow card) 83'	Box score	Wambach (yellow card) 35'	Stadium: Maryland SoccerPlex; Attendance: 2,871; Referee: Daniel Radford; Assistant referees: Mike Kampmeinert, Juan Guzman; Fourth official: Hakan Baydere

July 10, 2010 13	Chicago Red Stars	2–0	Sky Blue FC	Bridgeview, Illinois
		Box score	Masar 38' (Spilger); Koster 47' (o.g.)	Stadium: Toyota Park; Attendance: 4,064; Referee: Felisha Mariscal; Assistant referees: Kristen Schiereck, George Ghawi; Fourth official: Jorge Cuate

July 18, 2010 14	Sky Blue FC	0–1	Atlanta Beat	Piscataway, New Jersey
7:00 p.m.		Box score	Aluko 7' (Kerr); Sesselmann (yellow card) 85'	Stadium: Yurcak Field; Attendance: 2,808; Referee: Margaret Domka

July 24, 2010 15	Philadelphia Independence	4–1	Sky Blue FC	West Chester, Pennsylvania
7:00 p.m. EDT (UTC-4)	Lohman 7' (Seger); Rodriguez 8' (Seger), 52' (Seger); Magnúsdóttir 21'	Box score	Taylor 80'	Stadium: John A. Farrell Stadium; Attendance: 2,415; Referee: Tony Crush; Assistant referees: Stanford Nagle III, Adam Brugman; Fourth official: Darth Newman
Note: Broadcast on Comcast Sports Net Philadelphia

August 1, 2010 16	Sky Blue FC	1–2	Chicago Red Stars	Piscataway, New Jersey
7:00 p.m. EDT (UTC-4)	Taylor 90+' (Kai)	Box score Report	Masar 4' (Rapinoe); Carney 61' (Dalmy)	Stadium: Yurcak Field; Attendance: 3,539; Referee: Daniel Radford; Assistant referees: Mike Kampmeinert, Ryan Dos Reis; Fourth official: Hakan Baydere

August 7, 2010 17	Atlanta Beat	1–2	Sky Blue FC	Kennesaw, Georgia
	Aluko 62'	Box score	Averbuch (yellow card) 36'; Kalmari 44'; Ellertson 71' (o.g.); Rosana (yellow card) 79'; Schnur (yellow card) 90+'	Stadium: KSU Soccer Stadium; Attendance: 3,489; Referee: Michael Donovan; Assistant referees: Juan Guzman, Mark Cleland

August 11, 2010 18	Sky Blue FC	1–1	Washington Freedom	Piscataway, New Jersey
7:00 p.m. EDT (UTC-4)	Whitehill 80' (o.g.)	Box score	Bompastor 65' (Huffman)	Stadium: Yurcak Field; Attendance: 2,491; Referee: Allan Chapman; Assistant referees: Amy Willing, Ayodeji Obisesan; Fourth official: Albert Calise

August 15, 2010 19	Boston Breakers	4–0	Sky Blue FC	Boston, Massachusetts
6:00 p.m. EDT (UTC-4)	Cheney 9' (Angeli); Angeli 37' (Cox); Tarpley 50'; Osborne (yellow card) 60'; del Río 80'	Box score BOS report	Schnur (yellow card) 68'	Stadium: Harvard Stadium; Attendance: 6,108; Referee: Felisha Mariscal; Assistant referees: Debbie Coleman, Scott Kachmarik; Fourth official: Kellee Walsh
Note: Broadcast on Fox Sports Channel

August 22, 2010 20	Sky Blue FC	1–0	Philadelphia Independence	Piscataway, New Jersey
4:00 p.m. EDT (UTC-4)	Averbuch 61' (O'Reilly)	Box score		Stadium: Yurcak Field; Attendance: 2,572; Referee: Bryan Roslund; Assistant referees: Amy Willing, Ian O'Neil; Fourth official: Tim Snyder
Note: Broadcast on The Comcast Network

August 28, 2010 21	Washington Freedom	2–1	Sky Blue FC	Boyds, Maryland
7:00 p.m. EDT (UTC-4)	Wambach 79' (pen.), 84' (Long)	Box score	Kai 29'; Burke (yellow card) 78'	Stadium: Maryland SoccerPlex; Attendance: 3,143; Referee: Donald Dellavia; Assistant referees: Ashley Cedro, John Schmitz; Fourth official: Moo Hackett

September 1, 2010 22	Sky Blue FC	1–1	FC Gold Pride	Piscataway, New Jersey
7:00 p.m. EDT (UTC-4)	Kai 72' (O'Reilly) (yellow card) 73'; Taylor (yellow card) 73'; Lloyd (yellow card) 90+'	Box score	Riley (yellow card) 73'; Edwards 90' (Abily)	Stadium: Yurcak Field; Attendance: 3,412; Referee: Jose Carlos Rivero; Assistant referees: Debbie Coleman, Albert Calise; Fourth official: Emilie Buse

September 5, 2010 23	Atlanta Beat	0–0	Sky Blue FC	Kennesaw, Georgia
6:00 p.m. EDT (UTC-4)		Box score	Lloyd (yellow card) 88'	Stadium: KSU Soccer Stadium; Attendance: 4,752; Referee: Allan Chapman; Assistant referees: Melanie Johnson, Mark Cleland; Fourth official: Justin Nelson

September 11, 2010 24	Sky Blue FC	0–0	Boston Breakers	Piscataway, New Jersey
7:00 p.m. EDT (UTC-4)		Box score		Stadium: Yurcak Field; Attendance: 3,810; Referee: Felisha Mariscal; Assistant referees: Shelley Finger, John Schmitz; Fourth official: Brian Dunn

==== League table ====
Pos	Team	Pld	W	D	L	GF	GA	GD	Pts	Qualification
3	Philadelphia Independence	24	10	4	10	37	36	+1	34	Advance to First Round
4	Washington Freedom	24	8	7	9	33	33	0	31	Advance to First Round
5	Sky Blue FC	24	7	7	10	20	31	−11	28	
6	Chicago Red Stars	24	7	6	11	21	27	−6	27	
7	Atlanta Beat	24	5	6	13	20	40	−20	21	

Source: WPS Soccerway
Rules for classification: 1) points, 2) goal difference, 3) head-to-head result.

===== Results summary =====
Overall								Home						Away					
Pld	W	D	L	GF	GA	GD	Pts	W	D	L	GF	GA	GD	W	D	L	GF	GA	GD
24	7	7	10	20	31	−11	28	2	5	4	6	10	−4	5	2	6	14	21	−7

Last updated: September 11, 2010.
Source: WPS Soccerway

==== Results by matchday ====
Matchday	1	2	3	4	5	6	7	8	9	10	11	12	13	14	15	16	17	18	19	20	21	22	23	24
Stadium	H	A	A	H	A	A	H	A	A	H	A	H	A	H	A	H	A	H	A	H	A	H	A	H
Result	W	L	W	L	W	D	D	L	W	L	W	D	L	L	L	L	W	D	L	W	L	D	D	D
Position																		5	5					5

Updated to match(es) played on September 11, 2010. Source: WPS standings
A = Away; H = Home; W = Win; D = Draw; L = Loss

== Statistical summary ==
Sky Blue FC scored 20 goals, tied with the Atlanta Beat for the fewest goals scored on the season, and conceded 31. Forwards Laura Kalmari and Natasha Kai led the team in goals with five each. Heather O'Reilly led the team in assists with five. In goal, Karen Bardsley led all of Sky Blue FC's keepers with 10 starts, five shutouts, and a 0.90 goals-against average.

Rookie defender Brittany Taylor played every minute of the season.
