= 2009 Women's Professional Soccer Playoffs =

The 2009 WPS Playoffs were the postseason to Women's Professional Soccer's 2009 Season, that started on August 15 and culminated on August 22 at the Home Depot Center in Carson, California.

== Format ==
The top four WPS teams, based on their regular season finishes, qualified for the playoffs. In the First Round, the third-ranked team hosted the fourth-ranked team. The winner of that match advances to the Super Semifinal, where they traveled to the second-ranked team. Finally, the regular season first-ranked team hosted the winner of the Super Semifinal in the WPS Championship match.

This format, fairly unusual in the American sports landscape, preserves the knockout-style postseason most American sports fans are familiar with, while also highly favoring the regular season first-ranked team.

== Standings ==
Place	Team	GP	W	L	T	GF	GA	GD	Points
1	Los Angeles Sol	20	12	3	5	27	10	+17	41
2	Saint Louis Athletica	20	10	6	4	19	15	+4	33
3	Washington Freedom	20	8	7	5	32	32	0	29
4	Sky Blue FC	20	7	8	5	19	20	-1	26
5	Boston Breakers	20	7	9	4	18	20	-2	25
6	Chicago Red Stars	20	5	10	5	18	25	-7	20
7	FC Gold Pride	20	4	10	6	17	28	-11	18

== Bracket ==
First Round
3	Washington Freedom	1
4	Sky Blue FC	2

Super Semifinal
2	Saint Louis Athletica	0
4	Sky Blue FC	1

WPS Final
1	Los Angeles Sol	0
4	Sky Blue FC	1

== Results ==
=== First round ===
August 15, 2009
4:00 pm EDT

Washington Freedom	1 – 2	Sky Blue FC
De Vanna 79'	Report	Kai 56'; Francielle 85'

Maryland SoccerPlex, Germantown, Maryland
Attendance: 4,217
Referee: Daniel Fitzgerald

=== Super Semifinal ===
August 19, 2009
6:00 PM CDT

Saint Louis Athletica	0 – 1	Sky Blue FC
Logterman (yellow card) 90'	Report	Dowling 30'; Schnur (yellow card) 67'; Kai (yellow card) 78'

Soccer Park, Fenton, Missouri
Attendance: 5,064
Referee: Ted Unkel

=== WPS Championship ===
August 22, 2009
1:00 PM PDT

Los Angeles Sol	0 – 1	Sky Blue FC
	Report	O'Reilly 16'

The Home Depot Center, Carson, California
Attendance: 7,218
Referee: Kari Seitz

Los Angeles Sol	Sky Blue; FC

LOS ANGELES SOL:
GK	23	(Canada) Karina LeBlanc
DF	22	(United States) Manya Makoski
DF	11	(United States) Brittany Bock	(yellow card) 52'
DF	3	(United States) Allison Falk	(red card) 27'
DF	14	(United States) Stephanie Cox
MF	6	(United States) McCall Zerboni		(substituted off) 36'
MF	4	(United States) Aly Wagner		(substituted off) 63'
MF	7	(United States) Shannon Boxx (c)
MF	8	(Japan) Aya Miyama
FW	10	(Brazil) Marta
FW	9	(China) Han Duan		(substituted off) 79'
Substitutes:
GK	1	(United States) Val Henderson
DF	2	(United States) Keri Sanchez
DF	19	(Canada) Sharolta Nonen		(substituted on) 36'
DF	21	(Sweden) Johanna Frisk
MF	17	(United States) Liz Bogus
MF	18	(United States) Katie Larkin		(substituted on) 63'
FW	16	(United States) Lyndsey Patterson		(substituted on) 79'
Manager:
(England) Abner Rogers

SKY BLUE FC:
GK	23	(United States) Jenni Branam
DF	17	(United States) Keeley Dowling
DF	4	(United States) Jen Buczkowski
DF	3	(United States) Christie Rampone (c)
DF	12	(United States) Meghan Schnur
MF	20	(United States) Kacey White
MF	10	(United States) Yael Averbuch
MF	24	(Brazil) Francielle
FW	9	(United States) Heather O'Reilly (MVP)	(substituted off) 84'
FW	11	(Brazil) Rosana	(substituted off) 72'
FW	6	(United States) Natasha Kai	(substituted off) 68'
Substitutes:
GK	22	(United States) Cori Alexander
DF	38	(United States) Julianne Sitch
MF	7	(Canada) Kelly Parker
MF	13	(United States) Noelle Keselica	(substituted on) 84'
MF	14	(Australia) Collette McCallum	(substituted on) 72'
FW	15	(United States) Katie Hooker
FW	16	(United States) Kerri Hanks	(substituted on) 68'
Manager:
(United States) Christie Rampone

MATCH OFFICIALS

- Assistant referees:
  - Marlene Duffy
  - Veronica Perez
- Fourth official: Margaret Domka

MATCH RULES

- 90 minutes.
- 30 minutes of extra-time if necessary.
- Penalty shoot-out if scores still level.
- Seven named substitutes.
- Maximum of three substitutions.

== Media coverage ==
Both the First Round and the WPS Championship was viewable on Fox Sports Network, while the Super Semifinal was on Fox Soccer Channel. Also, all three matches were webcast on the WPS website.

== See also ==
- 2009 Women's Professional Soccer season
- Women's Professional Soccer
