= Buffalo FFillies =

The Buffalo FFillies were a W-League women's soccer club based out of Buffalo, New York. The team began playing in 1996 and folded during the 1998 season.

The team name was conceived as an equine homage to the Buffalo Stallions. The two F's were introduced to ward off accusations of sexism and in an attempt to make the name more memorable.

Four Canadian national team players represented the club, including Helen Stoumbos. While Christie Rampone and Pauliina Miettinen signed for the team in 1998. Team owner Mark Fishaut declared before the 1998 season that the club required crowds of 500 in order to survive, but they failed to achieve this and withdrew from the league five games into the campaign.

== Year-by-year ==
Year	Division	League	Reg. season	Playoffs	Avg. attendance
1996	1	USL W-League	7th, Central	Did not qualify	95
1997	1	USL W-League	6th, Northeast	Did not qualify	193
1998	1	USL W-League	6th, Central	Folded during season	
