= 2011 Sky Blue FC season =

Sky Blue FC
2011 season
- President & CEO: (Germany) Thomas Hofstetter
- Head Coach: (United States) Jim Gabarra
- Stadium: Yurcak Field
- Regular Season: 5th
- Playoffs: Did not qualify
- Women's U.S. Open Cup: Did not enter
- Top goalscorer: Casey Loyd (5)
Home colors	Away colors

The 2011 Sky Blue FC season was the team's third season of existence. Sky Blue played the 2011 season in Women's Professional Soccer, the top tier of women's soccer in the United States.

== Standings ==
Final regular season standings.

Blue denotes regular season champion, and top seed in 2011 Women's Professional Soccer Playoffs.
Green denotes team has spot in 2011 Women's Professional Soccer Playoffs.

Place	Team	Pld	W	D	L	GF	GA	GD	Pts
1	Western New York Flash	18	13	3	2	40	18	+22	42
2	Philadelphia Independence	18	11	3	4	31	18	+13	36
3	magicJack	18	9	2	7	29	29	0	28*
4	Boston Breakers**	18	5	4	9	19	24	-5	19
5	Sky Blue FC	18	5	4	9	24	29	-5	19
6	Atlanta Beat	18	1	4	13	7	32	-25	7

Source: WPS standings
*magicJack was docked one point on 12 May for various violations of league standards.
**Boston wins head-to-head 2-1-1 over Sky Blue.

== Team ==
=== Roster ===
2011 roster Note: Flags indicate national team as defined under FIFA eligibility rules; some limited exceptions apply. Players may hold more than one non-FIFA nationality.

No.	Pos.	Nation	Player
0	GK	(United States) USA	Kristin Arnold
4	MF	(United States) USA	Kendall Fletcher
5	DF	(England) ENG	Anita Asante
6	MF	(United States) USA	Angie Kerr
7	DF	(United States) USA	Lindsey Johnson
8	FW	(Spain) ESP	Adriana Martin Santamaria
9	MF	(United States) USA	Heather O'Reilly
10	MF	(United States) USA	Allie Long
11	MF	(Sweden) SWE	Therese Sjögran
14	DF	(United States) USA	Brittany Taylor
15	DF	(United States) USA	Danielle Johnson

No.	Pos.	Nation	Player
16	DF	(United States) USA	Michelle Wenino
17	MF	(United States) USA	Tobin Heath
18	FW	(England) ENG	Eniola Aluko
19	DF	(United States) USA	Carrie Dew
21	FW	(Finland) FIN	Laura Österberg Kalmari
22	GK	(United States) USA	Erin Guthrie
25	DF	(Netherlands) NED	Petra Hogewoning
27	FW	(United States) USA	Casey Nogueira
31	MF	(United States) USA	Carolyn Blank
33	DF	(United States) USA	Alyssa Mautz
41	MF	(United States) USA	Jenista Clark
