= Steven H. Temares =

American businessperson (born 1958)

Steven Howard Temares (born 1958) is an American businessperson who was the chief executive officer of Bed Bath & Beyond, a national chain of domestic merchandise retail stores in both the United States and Canada.

== Early life and education ==
Temares was born in 1958 in The Bronx, New York City, and grew up in Paramus, New Jersey. He was in the Paramus High School class of 1976. He earned a B.A. degree from Rutgers University in 1980 and attended the University of Pennsylvania Law School, where he was awarded a J.D. in 1983.

== Career ==
Temares had been a real estate lawyer before being hired by Bed Bath & Beyond in 1992. He served as a Director of Real Estate and General Counsel at Bed Bath & Beyond and had been the Chief Operating Officer since 1997, serving in that role until 2003 when he was named as the firm's Chief Executive Officer. He had been an Executive Vice President from 1997 to 1999 and was the company's President from 1999 to 2006.

On May 13, 2019, after facing pressure from three activist investment firms, Temares resigned his position as CEO of Bed Bath & Beyond, and he also gave up his seat on the company’s board of directors.

== Personal life ==
Temares is one of the three owners of NJ/NY Gotham FC, based in Harrison, New Jersey, a team that plays in the National Women's Soccer League and plays its games at Red Bull Arena at Harrison, New Jersey.

Temares serves on the Rutgers University Foundation Board of Overseers and donated $1.5 million in 2012 to Rutgers University to endow a faculty position in the school's Brain Health Institute after a visit to the school's New Brunswick, New Jersey campus at which Temares and his in-laws attended presentations about the university's programs. The contribution was matched by an anonymous donor who had made a donation of $27 million in 2011 to endow 18 chairs at Rutgers in its various schools. In honor of his wife's parents, the position created will be called the Charlotte and Murray Strongwater Endowed Chair in Neuroscience/Brain Health.

Temares and his wife Amy are residents of Warren Township, New Jersey.
