= 2008 WPS General Draft =

The 2008 WPS General Draft took place on October 6, 2008. It was the first general draft held by Women's Professional Soccer to assign the WPS rights of international and domestic players to the American-based teams.

== Round 1 ==
Pick	Player	Pos.	WPS Team	Previous team
1	Sarah Huffman	MF	Washington Freedom	Røa IL
2	Jill Oakes	DF	FC Gold Pride	Pali Blues
3	Becky Sauerbrunn	DF	Washington Freedom	Washington Freedom (W-League)
4	Amy LePeilbet	DF	Boston Breakers	Pali Blues
5	Karina LeBlanc	GK	Los Angeles Sol	New Jersey Wildcats
6	Danesha Adams	MF	Chicago Red Stars	Pali Blues
7	Cori Alexander	GK	Sky Blue FC	Seattle Sounders

== Round 2 ==
Pick	Player	Pos.	WPS Team	Previous team
8	Keeley Dowling	DF	Sky Blue FC	KIF Örebro DFF
9	Ella Masar	FW	Chicago Red Stars	Washington Freedom (W-League)
10	Kendall Fletcher	DF	Los Angeles Sol	Pali Blues
11	Nancy Augustyniak Goffi	DF	Boston Breakers	F.C. Indiana
12	Christie Welsh	FW	Los Angeles Sol	Washington Freedom (W-League)
13	Kandace Wilson	FW	FC Gold Pride	Pali Blues
14	India Trotter	DF	Saint Louis Athletica	1. FFC Frankfurt

== Round 3 ==
Pick	Player	Pos.	WPS Team	Previous team
15	Angie Woznuk	FW	Saint Louis Athletica	Portland
16	Liz Bogus	FW	FC Gold Pride	Pali Blues
17	Lori Lindsey	MF	Washington Freedom	Washington Freedom (W-League)
18	Sue Weber	DF	Boston Breakers	Long Island Rough Riders
19	Manya Makoski	MF	Los Angeles Sol	SoccerPlus Connecticut
20	Marian Dalmy	DF	Chicago Red Stars	Santa Clara
21	Kacey White	MF	Sky Blue FC	Bälinge IF

== Round 4 ==
Pick	Player	Pos.	WPS Team	Previous team
22	Jenny Anderson-Hammond	DF	Sky Blue FC	Chicago Gaels
23	Ifeoma Dieke	DF	Chicago Red Stars	Atlanta Beat
24	Joanna Lohman	DF	Saint Louis Athletica	Bälinge IF
25	Kristin Luckenbill	GK	Boston Breakers	F.C. Indiana
26	Amanda Cinalli	FW	Saint Louis Athletica	Cleveland Internationals
27	Tracy Hamm	DF	FC Gold Pride	California Storm
28	Emily Janss	DF	Washington Freedom	Washington Freedom (W-League)

== Draft notes ==
The order was established based on a lottery done at the board of governors meeting on September 15, 2008, prior to the U.S. National Team allocation on September 17. The order was 1-7, 7-1, 1-7, 7-1. The WPS General Draft was open to both domestic and international players.

== See also ==
- List of foreign WPS players
