= Daphne Koster =

Dutch footballer (born 1981)

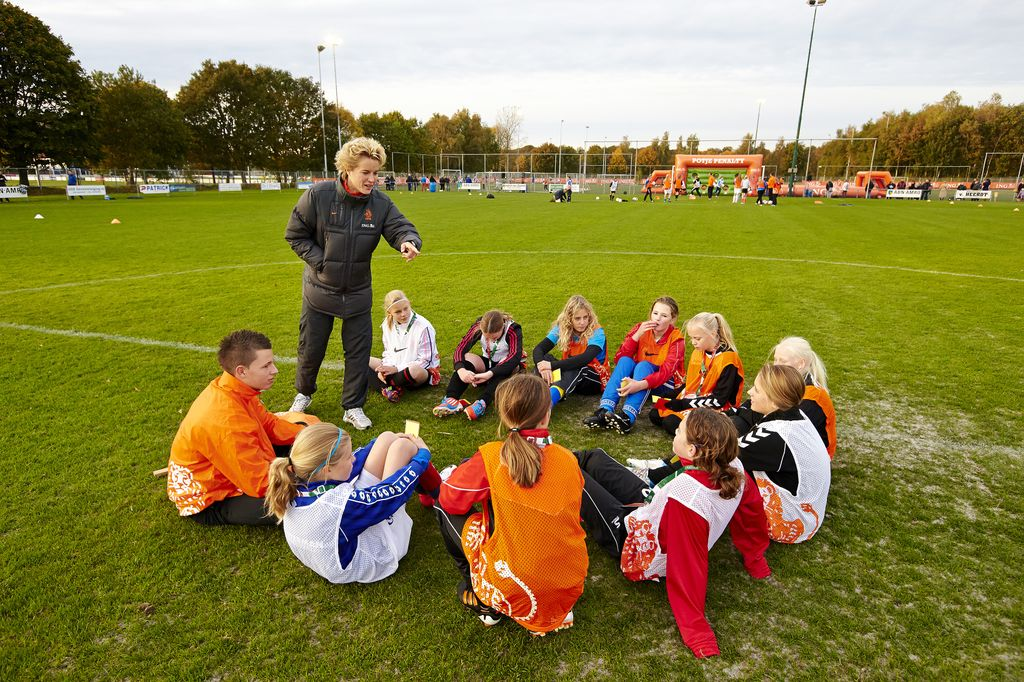
- Koster (standing) in 2012

Personal information
- Full name: Daphne Helena Koster
- Date of birth: 13 March 1981 (age 45)
- Place of birth: The Hague, Netherlands
- Height: 1.75 m (5 ft 9 in)
- Position: Defender

Youth career
- 1987–2000: SVA

Senior career*
Years	Team	Apps	(Gls)
2000–2007	Ter Leede		
2007–2010	AZ	56	(8)
2010	Sky Blue FC	18	(0)
2011	AZ	4	(0)
2011–2012	Telstar	8	(1)
2012–2017	Ajax	87	(0)

International career
1997	Netherlands U19		
1997–2013	Netherlands	139	(7)
- * Club domestic league appearances and goals

Daphne Helena Koster (born 13 March 1981) is a retired Dutch football player, who played as a defender for Ajax in the Vrouwen Eredivisie. She also played in the American Women's Professional Soccer (WPS) for Sky Blue FC. A powerful centre back, she was the captain of both the Netherlands women's national football team and Ajax.

== Career ==
=== Sky Blue ===
Koster made her league debut against Chicago Red Stars on 11 April 2010.

=== AZ ===
Koster made her league debut against Utrecht on 17 February 2011.

=== Alkmaar ===
Koster made her league debut against ADO Den Haag on 9 September 2011. She made her league debut against Heerenveen on 30 September 2011, scoring in the 43rd minute.

=== Ajax ===
Koster made her league debut against Heerenveen on 24 August 2012.

== International career ==
Koster made her senior national team debut as a 16-year-old in August 1997 against Switzerland. At the time, she was playing for a boys' amateur club, SVA Assendelft, where she played until under-19 level.

In 2005, Koster retired from the national team due to problems with Vera Pauw. She was recalled to the national team in 2007.

In 2009, Koster was a mainstay of the Dutch national team, which reached the semi-finals of UEFA Women's Euro 2009 in Finland.

Koster made her 100th international appearance against Slovakia on 1 April 2010.

In June 2013, national team coach Roger Reijners selected Koster for the Netherlands' squad for the UEFA Women's Euro 2013 in Sweden.

== Later career ==
On 10 July 2019, it was announced that Koster had signed a contract with Ajax for an indefinite period.

She became administrative manager of women's football for Ajax, and is part of changing the culture in the club after the incident with Marc Overmars.

== Personal life ==
Koster maintained a weekly blog for the Telegraaf of Amsterdam. Koster's biography, Never Again Offside, was published by Iris Koppe.

== International goals ==
Scores and results list the Netherlands goal tally first.

Goal	Date	Venue	Opponent	Score	Result	Competition
1.	20 March 2001	Gemeentelijk Stadion, Kontich, Belgium	Belgium	3–0	4–0	Friendly
2.	10 May 2001	West Lothian Courier Stadium, Livingston, Scotland	Scotland	2–0	2–0	Friendly
3.	13 August 2001	Fortuna Wormerveer, Wormerveer, Netherlands	Finland	2–1	2–1	Friendly
4.	25 April 2004	Den Dreef, Heverlee, Belgium	Belgium	1–0	3–0	2005 UEFA Women's Euro qualification
5.	10 August 2008	Caledonian Stadium, Pretoria, South Africa	South Africa	1–0	2–1	Friendly
6.	29 October 2009	Oosterenkstadion, Zwolle, Netherlands	North Macedonia	7–0	13–1	2011 FIFA Women's World Cup qualification
7.	27 March 2010	Polman Stadion, Almelo, Netherlands	Slovakia	2–0	2–0	2011 FIFA Women's World Cup qualification
