= Meghan Schnur =

American soccer player (born 1985)

Personal information
- Full name: Meghan Elisabeth Schnur
- Date of birth: April 16, 1985 (age 41)
- Place of birth: Butler, Pennsylvania, U.S.
- Height: 5 ft 6 in (1.68 m)
- Position: Midfielder

College career
Years	Team	Apps	(Gls)
2003–2007	Connecticut Huskies		

Senior career*
Years	Team	Apps	(Gls)
2004–2008	New England Mutiny		
2009–2010	Sky Blue FC	20	(0)
2011	magicJack		

International career^{‡}
- United States U-17
- United States U-19
- United States U-21
- United States U-23
2010	United States	6	(0)
- * Club domestic league appearances and goals as of 06:15, October 22, 2009 (UTC) ‡ National team caps and goals as of July 17, 2010

Meghan Elisabeth Schnur (born April 16, 1985) is a retired American soccer midfielder, who played for Sky Blue FC of Women's Professional Soccer, and was a member of the United States U-23 women's national soccer team. Schnur is an alumnus of Butler Senior High School.

== Career ==
Schnur played college soccer at the University of Connecticut from 2003 until 2007, and was a First Team All-Big East selection each year. In 2007, she was named an NSCAA All-American, and was a two-time Big East Midfielder of the Year.

In 2009, Schnur was selected in the second round (11th overall) in the inaugural Women's Professional Soccer draft by Sky Blue FC, later winning the first league title. After knee surgery in 2011, Schnur retired from professional soccer to pursue a career as a physical therapist.

In 2013, Schnur was inducted into the WPIAL Hall of Fame.
