= Kelly Parker =

Canadian soccer player

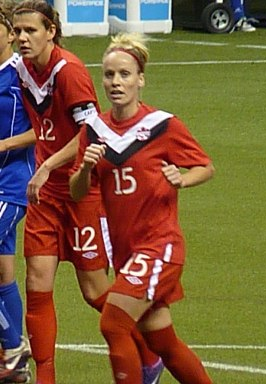

Personal information
- Full name: Kelly Parker
- Date of birth: 8 March 1981 (age 45)
- Place of birth: Regina, Saskatchewan, Canada
- Height: 5 ft 3 in (1.60 m)
- Position: Midfielder

College career
Years	Team	Apps	(Gls)
1999–2002	UTEP Miners		

Senior career*
Years	Team	Apps	(Gls)
2003–2007	Ottawa Fury	66	(56)
2008	F.C. Indiana	14	(4)
2009	Sky Blue FC	17	(0)
2010	SC Freiburg	5	(0)
2010	Buffalo Flash	7	(11)
2010	Sky Blue FC	1	(0)
2011	Western New York Flash	4	(0)
2011	Atlanta Beat	8	(0)

International career
2003–2012	Canada	40	(3)
Medal record
Women's soccer
Representing Canada
Olympic Games
Bronze medal – third place	2012 London	Team
Pan American Games
Gold medal – first place	2011 Guadalajara	Team
- * Club domestic league appearances and goals

Kelly Parker (born 8 March 1981) is a Canadian former soccer midfielder who last played for Atlanta Beat in Women's Professional Soccer. She was also a member of the Canadian national team from 2003 to 2012. She is the only player to have been named W-League MVP twice.

== Early life ==
Despite having her birthplace officially listed as Regina, Saskatchewan, Parker never actually lived in Regina, with the city only being given because it was the nearest city to the farm on which her family lived at the time of her birth. At age 5 she, along with her family, relocated from their farm near Maryfield to Saskatoon, where she spent the majority of her childhood.

Parker's time in organised soccer began at age 9 with Saskatoon United Soccer Club. She was the Saskatchewan Soccer Youth Female Player of the Year in 1998. She attended Evan Hardy Collegiate, where she was named Athlete of the Year in 1999.

Parker played for Team Saskatchewan at the Canada Summer Games in 1997 and 2001, and also played for the provincial team at the Western Canada Summer Games.

== Career ==
=== Collegiate career ===
Parker played for the UTEP Miners in Division 1 of the NCAA from 1999 to 2002. She was named the team's MVP in her sophomore year. She captained the team in her junior and senior years. In her senior year, she started in all 19 of the Miners' games, making 19 assists (the nation's most that season) and scoring 11 goals. Her 30 assists overall during her time with the Miners is a program record. She was named to the academic-all league in all four of her years with the University of Texas at El Paso. She graduated with a bachelor's degree in Communications/Public Relations.

In 2015, Parker was inducted into the UTEP Athletics Hall of Fame, with the university labelling her as "one of the greatest players to ever wear a Miner uniform."

=== Club career ===
Parker is the all-time top goalscorer for the Ottawa Fury. Parker was the league's top goalscorer in the 2003 season. In 2004, she was named league MVP for the first time.

In 2009, Parker was drafted by Sky Blue FC. She was part of the squad which became inaugural Women's Professional Soccer champions in the 2009 season, and was honoured at the White House by President Obama following the victory.

Prior to joining SC Freiburg in January 2010, Parker played for Sky Blue FC of Women's Professional Soccer, UTEP Miners, Ottawa Fury and F.C. Indiana. Her time in the Frauen-Bundesliga was cut short due to injury.

Parker played for W-League winners Buffalo Flash in 2010 and was named MVP after scoring 11 goals in seven games and helping the Flash to an unbeaten league season. This was the second time she had won the award, having done so with Ottawa Fury in 2004. She earned particular praise for her performances during the Flash's playoff run. In August 2010 Parker returned to Sky Blue FC, where she had played in 2009. Parker played her last professional season in 2011 with the Western New York Flash and the Atlanta Beat.

Parker is the only player to have been named the United Soccer League's W-League Most Valuable Player twice, winning the award in 2004 and 2010.

== International career ==
Parker was a member of the Canada women's national soccer team from 2003 to 2012. After making her debut in 2003, she did not play for the national team until 2009, attributing this to her playing style not fitting within the team's system until Carolina Morace took charge of the team.

Parker scored her first goal for Canada in a 3–0 win over Poland on 20 February 2010, the same match where teammate Christine Sinclair broke the record for appearances for Canada and scored her 100th goal. She was part of the squad which won the 2010 Cyprus Women's Cup.

Parker featured in the 2011 World Cup, coming off the bench at the beginning of the second half in Canada's 2–1 defeat against Germany on 26 June 2011.

Parker played every minute of all of Canada's matches in their run to win gold at the 2011 Pan American Games.

In the semifinals of the 2012 CONCACAF Women's Olympic Qualifying Tournament, Parker provided the assist on the goal which qualified Canada for the 2012 Olympics in a 3–1 win over Mexico on 27 January 2012. She was part of the team which won silver in the competition.

Prior to the 2012 Olympics, Parker underwent surgery to repair a meniscus injury. In advance of the tournament, Canada head coach John Herdman said of Parker "Her energy is second to none. She’s got an engine bigger than most".

She won the bronze medal with Canada in the 2012 Olympics when they defeated France 1–0 on 9 August 2012. Following the Olympics, she was named as the co-winner of the Saskatchewan Soccer Senior Female Player of the Year for 2012 and retired from playing professionally.

== Coaching career ==
Following her time playing with the program, Parker served as Undergraduate Assistant Coach (2003–04) and then Assistant Coach (2004–08) with the UTEP Miners.

Parker is the Technical Director and co-founder of the LA Bulls Soccer Club, which began in 2018. In 2023, the club joined MLS Next, where Parker serves as a head coach and head of scouting.

== Honours and awards ==
- NCAA Div. 1 Assist Leader: 2002
- United Soccer League's W-League MVP: 2004; 2010
- Saskatchewan Sports Hall of Fame: 2019
- Canadian Olympic Hall of Fame (London 2012 Women's Soccer Team): 2019
- Saskatoon Sports Hall of Fame: 2023
- Ottawa Sport Hall of Fame (London 2012 Women's Soccer Team): 2025
