= Christie Pearce =

American soccer player (born 1975)

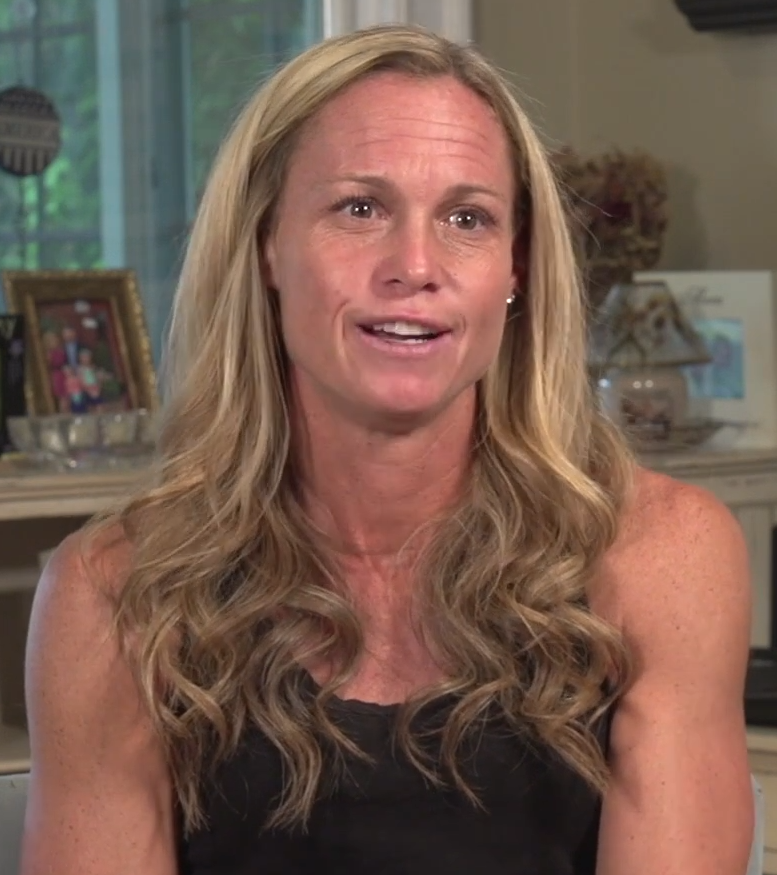
- Pearce in 2016

Personal information
- Full name: Christie Patricia Pearce
- Date of birth: June 24, 1975 (age 51)
- Place of birth: Fort Lauderdale, Florida, U.S.
- Height: 5 ft 6 in (1.68 m)
- Position: Center back

College career
Years	Team	Apps	(Gls)
1993–1996	Monmouth Hawks		

Senior career*
Years	Team	Apps	(Gls)
1997	Central Jersey Splash		
1998	Buffalo FFillies		
1998	New Jersey Lady Stallions		
2001–2003	New York Power	55	(0)
2009–2010	Sky Blue FC	30	(0)
2011	magicJack	11	(0)
2013–2017	Sky Blue FC	87	(2)

International career
1997–2015	United States	311	(4)

Managerial career
- 2009: Sky Blue FC (caretaker player/manager)
Medal record
Women's soccer
Representing United States
Olympic Games
Gold medal – first place	2004 Athens	Team
Gold medal – first place	2008 Beijing	Team
Gold medal – first place	2012 London	Team
Silver medal – second place	2000 Sydney	Team
FIFA Women's World Cup
Winner	1999 United States
Winner	2015 Canada
Runner-up	2011 Germany
Bronze medal – third place	2003 United States
Bronze medal – third place	2007 China
- * Club domestic league appearances and goals

Christie Patricia Pearce (formerly Rampone; born June 24, 1975) is an American former professional soccer player who played as a defender. She is the former captain of the United States national team. Pearce is a three-time Olympic gold medalist, and also a two-time world champion in FIFA Women's World Cup.

Pearce has played in five FIFA Women's World Cup finals and four Olympics women's soccer tournaments. She is a 1999 and 2015 FIFA Women's World Cup champion, and a three-time gold medalist having won championship titles at the 2004 Athens Olympics, 2008 Beijing Olympics and 2012 London Olympics. She finished no lower than third place in each of the World Cup or Olympic tournaments in which she competed.

Pearce played in the W-League from 1997 through 1998. She played in two American professional leagues the entire time they were in operation; from 2001 through 2003 in the WUSA and from 2009 through 2011 in the WPS. In 2009, while playing for Sky Blue FC, she simultaneously served as coach of the club while winning the 2009 Women's Professional Soccer Playoffs, and was named WPS Sportswoman of the Year.

Pearce was the oldest player to appear in a FIFA Women's World Cup game (at age 40) until Formiga competed in the 2019 FIFA Women's World Cup at the age of 41. With 311 caps, Pearce is also the third-most capped player, male or female, in U.S. and world history, after Kristine Lilly and Carli Lloyd.

On June 9, 2021, it was announced that Pearce was to be inducted into the National Soccer Hall of Fame in her first year of eligibility.

== Early life ==
Born in Fort Lauderdale, Florida, Christie Pearce grew up in Point Pleasant, New Jersey. During her high school years, she was a four-sport athlete in soccer, basketball, track, and field hockey. While attending Point Pleasant Borough High School, she scored 2,190 career high school basketball points, and was the first female athlete in New Jersey history to lead her conference in scoring in three different sports. This accomplishment led her to all-state honors in all three sports. Pearce was heralded as the best athlete Ocean County, New Jersey had ever produced.

=== Monmouth University ===
Pearce attended Monmouth University, located in West Long Branch, New Jersey, after being highly recruited by nearly every major college in the country. At Monmouth, she excelled as a three-sport athlete in soccer, basketball, and lacrosse. During her senior year, she opted to ease away from her starting point guard basketball position to train and travel with the United States women's national soccer team. On the Monmouth soccer field, Pearce was a two-time Northeast Conference Player of the Year selection and First Team All Mid-Atlantic Region selection, posting ten multiple-goal games in her senior year. She finished her collegiate soccer career with a start in all 80 games, led her team with 79 career goals and 54 assists, and was Monmouth's record holder for goals, assists, and points in a season.

When not on the field, Pearce studied towards a degree in Special Education, which she completed in 1996. She also worked as a volunteer basketball and soccer coach when completing her student teaching with Monmouth. As a tribute to her achievements and for the worldwide fame she brought to her alma mater, the university awarded her with an honorary degree in Public Service in 2005. Furthermore, the university inducted her into the Monmouth University Hall of Fame in 2007 and honored her 2008 Olympic accomplishments by declaring October 5, 2008 as Christie Rampone Day.

== Club career ==
After college, Pearce played for Central Jersey Splash and New Jersey Lady Stallions, in 1997 and 1998 respectively, of the W-League.

In 2001, she was selected as a member of New York Power, a professional soccer team in Women's United Soccer Association. In the first year, Christie played every minute of the first 18 games until tearing her anterior cruciate ligament, sidelining her for the rest of the season. In 2002, Christie bounced back to play in 1699 minutes over 19 games, and another 18 games in 2003 in addition to her national team duties. Shortly after concluding its third season, the WUSA suspended all operations. In anticipation of an eventual relaunch, WUSA preserved its rights in the team names, logos and similar properties.

The next attempt at women's professional soccer in the United States kicked off in 2008 under the name of Women's Professional Soccer. On September 16, 2008, the initial WPS player allocation was conducted and Pearce was chosen as captain for New Jersey's Sky Blue FC with fellow US Women's National Team players Heather O'Reilly and Natasha Kai.

In its inaugural season, Pearce and Sky Blue FC struggled, including the suspension of their first head coach Ian Sawyers and the resignation of his successor, Kelly Lindsey. In July 2009, the Sky Blue organization announced that Pearce would serve as the caretaker coach, in addition to her playing duties, for the remainder of the WPS season. After taking on the position as head coach, the third in one season for Sky Blue FC, Pearce took her team on to win the 2009 Women's Professional Soccer Playoffs. It was later revealed she was almost three months pregnant with her second child at the time of the match. One week later, she was named WPS Sportswoman of the Year.

She remained with Sky Blue in a playing role for 2010 before switching to magicJack ahead of the 2011 Women's Professional Soccer season.

On January 11, 2013, Pearce was one of three members from the United States women's national team that was allocated to the new NWSL club Sky Blue FC, along with Jillian Loyden and Kelley O'Hara. She came second in voting for NWSL Defender of the Year behind Becky Sauerbrunn in the 2013 season.

== International career ==
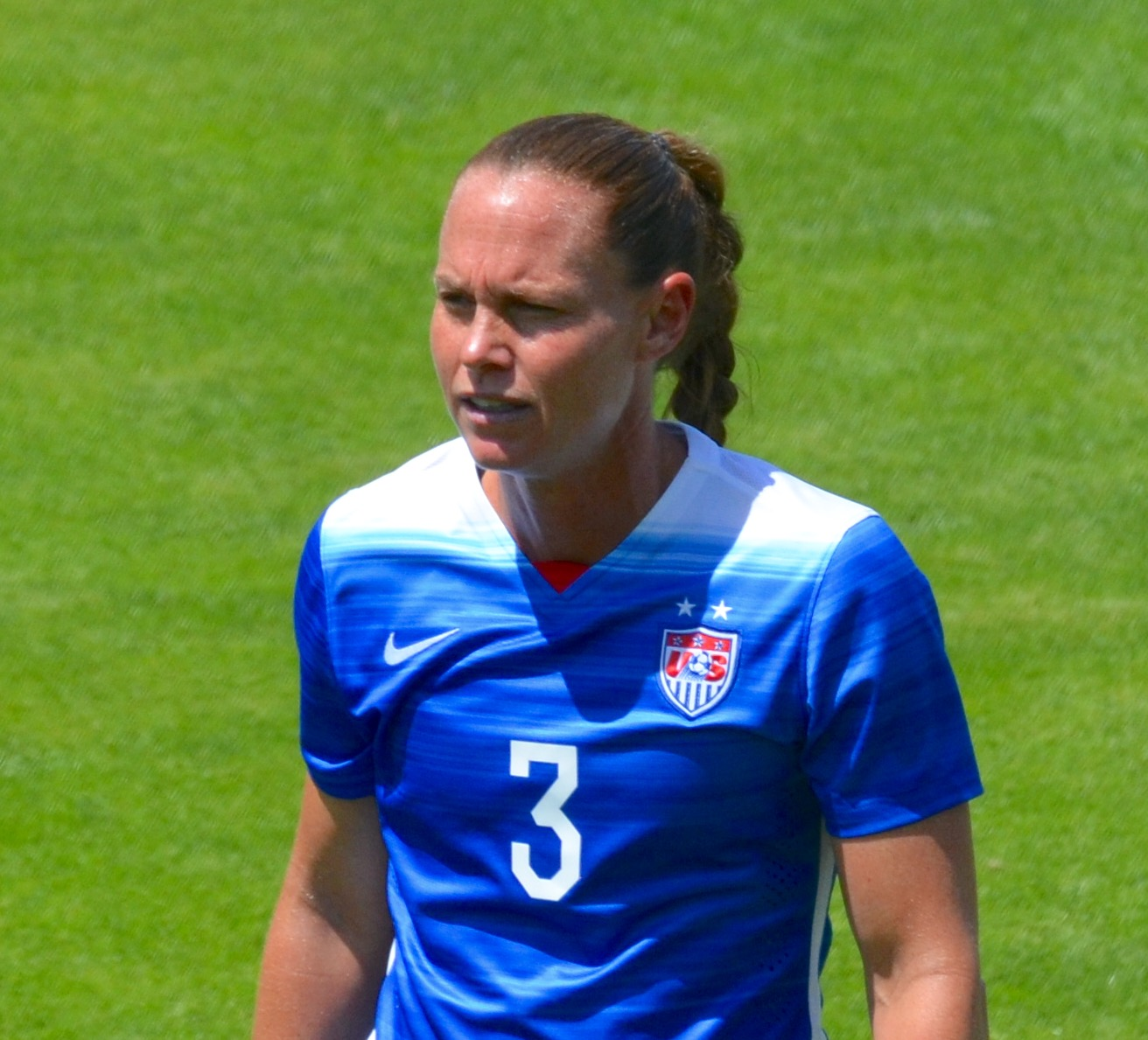
Pearce training with the United States team in 2015.

Christie Pearce has represented the United States at the 1999, 2003, 2007, 2011, and 2015 FIFA Women's World Cup finals, in addition to the 2000, 2004, 2008, and 2012 Summer Olympics.

After training with the United States women's national soccer team during her senior year at Monmouth, she switched to playing as a defender. Pearce's first game was February 28, 1997 versus Australia. She tallied her first national team goal on May 2, 1997, in a match versus South Korea. Pearce started 16/18 games in her first season and finished with two goals and three assists. The following year, Pearce helped her team to its first undefeated season and led the United States to gold in the 1998 Goodwill Games by starting in both matches.

Pearce played 2540 minutes with the national team in 2000, including five games at the 2000 Summer Olympics in Sydney. The team finished with the silver medal. In 2001, Pearce tore her anterior cruciate ligament and missed a majority of the limited national team season. Pearce was back with the team for two training camps in 2002, but focused on recovering from her surgery. In 2003, she started in 15/17 national team games and all four World Cup matches to lead her team to the bronze medal.

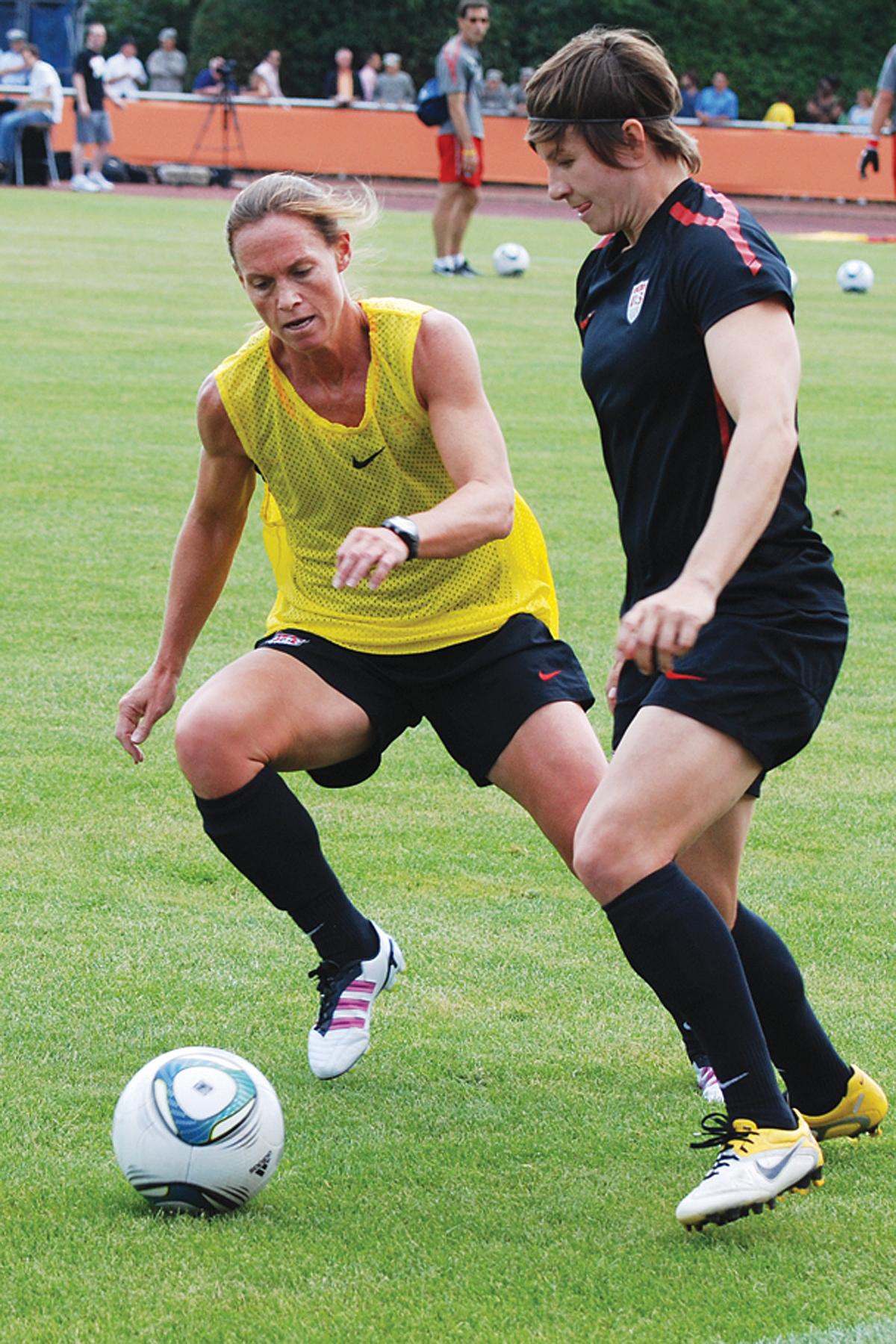
Pearce (in yellow) vies for the ball with U.S. teammate Amy LePeilbet during practice June 30, 2011, in Heidelberg, Germany.

In the 2004 Athens Olympics, she helped the United States win gold after defeating Brazil in what would be the final Olympic Games for a few of her senior teammates: Mia Hamm, Brandi Chastain and Julie Foudy. It was in this same year that Pearce would become the fifth most capped defender in United States history.

Pearce returned to the team in 2006, after taking off the 2005 season to have her first child. In 2006, Christie returned to the team just 112 days after giving birth for China's Four Nations Tournament. 2007 brought Pearce's busiest year to date, starting in all 20 games in which she played and she became the most capped defender and second-most capped played on the 2007 FIFA Women's World Cup team. She started in all six matches of the World Cup.

In 2008, Pearce was named captain of the Women's National Team and led the United States to the Gold medal once again, earning her 200th National Team cap at the 2008 Summer Olympics. With the retirement of teammate Kristine Lilly in 2010, she became the most capped active player in the world.

Pearce captained the U.S. team to win second place at 2011 FIFA Women's World Cup, losing to Japan 1–3 in the penalty shoot-out, having drawn the final match at 2–2 at the end of extra-time. She played all 600 minutes in all 6 matches U.S. played.

In 2012 London Olympics, Pearce captained the U.S. team to a 2–1 gold medal win over Japan in the final; playing all 570 minutes in 6 matches and was a key free kick taker throughout the tournament. Pearce also saved a shot off the line from Japan in the Olympic final. The U.S. team won all six matches it played at the 2012 London Olympics, including 3 shutouts.

As of September 20, 2015, Christie Pearce is currently second on the all-time cap list with 311.

On July 5, 2015, she became the oldest woman to play in a FIFA Women's World Cup final, and in any tournament game, at age 40 years, 11 days, when she entered the final against Japan during the 86th minute. In 1999 she played against Korea DPR in the group stage, and in 2015 she played against Nigeria in the group stage, and in the final against Japan.

== Personal life ==
Pearce is of Scottish descent and sporting heritage; her great-grandfather Bill Dowie was a goalkeeper with Raith Rovers before emigrating to the United States in the 1920s.

Pearce has two daughters with her ex-husband Chris Rampone: Rylie (born 2005) and Reece (born 2010). She and Rampone divorced in 2017. Though married to Chris in 2001, Pearce did not use the name "Rampone" on her jersey until 2004.

In July 2011, Pearce revealed she had Lyme disease. Pearce is currently engaged to Racing Louisville FC former-head coach Christy Holly.

=== Endorsements ===
In 2012, Jersey Mike's Subs appointed Jersey Shore native Pearce as its first spokesperson in its 56-year history. She and her ex-husband have since become franchisees of the chain, opening two locations in Toms River, New Jersey in early 2017.

== In popular culture ==
=== Video games ===
Pearce was featured along with her national teammates in EA Sports' FIFA video game series in FIFA 16, the first time women players were included in the game. In September 2015, she was ranked by EA Sports as the number 8 women's player in the game.

=== Ticker tape parade and White House honor ===
Following the United States' win at the 2015 FIFA Women's World Cup, Pearce and her teammates became the first women's sports team to be honored with a ticker tape parade in New York City. Each player received a key to the city from Mayor Bill de Blasio. In October of the same year, the team was honored by President Barack Obama at the White House.

== Career statistics ==
Key (expand for notes on "international goals" and sorting)
Location	Geographic location of the venue where the competition occurred Sorted by country name first, then by city name
Lineup	Start – played entire match on minute (off player) – substituted on at the minute indicated, and player was substituted off at the same time off minute (on player) – substituted off at the minute indicated, and player was substituted on at the same time (c) – captain Sorted by minutes played
Min	The minute in the match the goal was scored. For list that include caps, blank indicates played in the match but did not score a goal.
Assist/pass	The ball was passed by the player, which assisted in scoring the goal. This column depends on the availability and source of this information.
penalty or pk	Goal scored on penalty-kick which was awarded due to foul by opponent. (Goals scored in penalty-shoot-out, at the end of a tied match after extra-time, are not included.)
Score	The match score after the goal was scored. Sorted by goal difference, then by goal scored by the player's team
Result	The final score. Sorted by goal difference in the match, then by goal difference in penalty-shoot-out if it is taken, followed by goal scored by the player's team in the match, then by goal scored in the penalty-shoot-out. For matches with identical final scores, match ending in extra-time without penalty-shoot-out is a tougher match, therefore precede matches that ended in regulation
aet	The score at the end of extra-time; the match was tied at the end of 90' regulation
pso	Penalty-shoot-out score shown in parentheses; the match was tied at the end of extra-time
	Green background color – exhibition or closed door international friendly match
	Yellow background color – match at an invitational tournament
NOTE: some keys may not apply for a particular football player

	Date	Location	Opponent	Lineup	Min	Score	Result	Competition
1	1997-05-02	Milwaukee	Korea Republic	Start	79	7–0	7–0	International Friendly
2	1997-06-05	Ambler	Australia	Start	37	5–0	9–1	1997 Nike U.S. Cup
3	2000-04-05	Davidson	Iceland	Start	54	4–0	8–0	Closed door international friendly
4	2000-04-05	Davidson	Iceland	Start	84	8–0	8–0	Closed door international friendly

Preceded by Kristine Lilly	WNT captain 2008–2016	Succeeded by Carli Lloyd / Becky Sauerbrunn
