= Ian Sawyers =

English football manager

Personal information
- Date of birth: 2 May 1962 (age 64)
- Place of birth: Sunderland, England
- Position: Midfielder

Senior career*
Years	Team	Apps	(Gls)
- Rotherham United Reserves

Managerial career
- 1990–1993: Stanford Cardinal (assistant)
- 1993–1995: Stanford Cardinal
- 1993–1998: Sacramento Storm
- 2001–2003: Bay Area/San Jose CyberRays
- 2008–2009: Sky Blue FC
- * Club domestic league appearances and goals

Ian Sawyers (born 2 May 1962) is an English football manager.

Sawyers attended Carnegie College, a division of Leeds Metropolitan University in Leeds, England. He played professional soccer for the Rotherham United club. Sawyers became Director of Soccer for the Mission Viejo Soccer Club, a youth soccer program based in Laguna Hills, California, in the late 1980s.

Sawyers then joined the staff of the Stanford University women's soccer program. He was promoted to acting head coach at Stanford in 1993 when former head coach Berhane Andeberhan stepped down. During Sawyers' first season of leadership, the Stanford Cardinal earned a program-record 18 wins and reached the Final Four of the NCAA Division I Championship. Over three seasons, Sawyers led the Cardinal to a 50-8-4 record. Sawyers also served as head coach of the Sacramento Storm, a W-League team, from 1993 to 1998.

Sawyers was named head coach of the Bay Area CyberRays, later known as the San Jose CyberRays, one of the eight founding member teams in the Women's United Soccer Association. The CyberRays won the inaugural WUSA championship, and Sawyers was named WUSA Coach of the Year for 2001. Sawyers coached the CyberRays for two more seasons, until the WUSA suspended its operations in 2003.

In 2008, Sawyers was named head coach of Sky Blue FC, a Women's Professional Soccer team based in Somerset County in New Jersey and scheduled to play its first match in April 2009. On 23 May 2009, Sky Blue FC announced that Sawyers had been suspended indefinitely due to differences with the organization's ownership.

== Personal life ==
Julie Foudy and Sawyers have been married since 1995. Their first child Isabel Ann was born in January 2007, and a son named Declan arrived in December 2008. Sawyers and Foudy have jointly conducted youth soccer camps and worked on other soccer-development projects through the Julie Foudy Sports Leadership Academy.
