= Pauliina Miettinen =

Finnish footballer and coach (born 1972)

Personal information
- Full name: Pauliina Miettinen
- Date of birth: 20 May 1972 (age 54)
- Place of birth: Kuopio, Finland
- Positions: Goalkeeper; striker

Team information
- Current team: Tikkurilan Palloseura (head coach)

Youth career
- 1996–1999: Franklin Pierce Ravens

Senior career*
Years	Team	Apps	(Gls)
- KuPS
- KMF
- Pyrkivä Turku
1998	Buffalo FFillies		
1998–2000	Boston Renegades		
- HJK

International career^{‡}
1992–2004	Finland	26	(0)

Managerial career
- 2009–2010: Sky Blue FC
- 2011–2013: PK-35 Vantaa
- 2020–: TiPS
- * Club domestic league appearances and goals as of 25 March 2011 ‡ National team caps and goals as of 23 October 2011

Pauliina Miettinen (born 20 May 1972) is a Finnish football coach and former player. She currently works as the head coach of the Kansallinen Liiga team Tikkurilan Palloseura.

During her playing career, Miettinen played as goalkeeper, defender and forward. She is one of the few footballers who have played both in goal (9 caps) and on the field (17 caps) at international level.

Miettinen's first club was KMF from her hometown Kuopio. She has played in Finnish clubs FC Kontu, Turun Pyrkivä, Malmin Palloseura and HJK Helsinki. Miettinen also played for the Boston Renegades and captained at Franklin Pierce College, where she managed to muster 122 goals and 65 assists, an NCAA record with 309 points. She won the Finnish championship with HJK in 2001 and the Finnish Cup with Pyrkivä in 1994 and with HJK in 2002.

Miettinen started her coaching career during her playing days. She was assistant coach at Franklin Pierce, her alma mater, and she has also coached at Barry University and Florida State University. After finishing her playing career, Miettinen became the head coach of FC Kontu and then PK-35 Vantaa. After the 2009 season, Miettinen was named as the head coach of Sky Blue FC, but she was dismissed on 19 July 2010. In October 2010 she returned to PK-35 Vantaa. At PK-35 Vantaa she won the Finnish Championship in 2011 and 2012, and Finnish Women's Cup in 2011, 2012 and 2013. Miettinen also guided the club to the knockout phase of the UEFA Women's Champions League three times. She quit in 2013, but returned to management in 2019 with the women's team of Nurmijärven Jalkapalloseura who played in the third tier. In December 2019 she was appointed as the head coach of the Tikkurilan Palloseura in Kansallinen Liiga.

Miettinen graduated from Franklin Pierce in 1999 with a bachelor's degree in secondary education and psychology and from Barry in 2005 with a master's degree in elementary education.
