= Jenni Branam =

American soccer goalkeeper (born 1980)

Personal information
- Full name: Jennifer Lee Branam
- Date of birth: October 8, 1980 (age 46)
- Place of birth: Anaheim, California, United States
- Height: 1.83 m (6 ft 0 in)
- Position: Goalkeeper

College career
Years	Team	Apps	(Gls)
1999–2002	North Carolina Tar Heels		

Senior career*
Years	Team	Apps	(Gls)
2001	Charlotte Lady Eagles	6	(0)
2003	San Diego Spirit	11	(0)
2005	Arizona Heatwave	12	(0)
2005	Bälinge IF		
2009–2011	Sky Blue FC	39	(0)

International career
- United States U-21
2000–2006	United States	6	(0)
- * Club domestic league appearances and goals

Jennifer Lee Branam (born October 8, 1980) is an American former soccer goalkeeper. She played full–time professional soccer for San Diego Spirit of Women's United Soccer Association and Sky Blue FC of Women's Professional Soccer. Branam was a member of the United States women's national soccer team, winning six caps between 2000 and 2006.

She retired from soccer in 2011 to pursue a career as a nurse.
