= Cori Callahan =

American soccer player and photographer

Cori Alexander
Personal information
- Full name: Corinne Renae Callahan
- Birth name: Corinne Renae Alexander
- Date of birth: May 6, 1985 (age 41)
- Place of birth: Walnut Creek, California, U.S.
- Height: 5 ft 11 in (1.80 m)
- Position: Goalkeeper

Team information
- Current team: California Golden Bears (assistant coach)

Youth career
- –2003: College Park Falcons
- –2004: Pleasanton Rage

College career
Years	Team	Apps	(Gls)
2003–2006	Portland Pilots	95	(0)

Senior career*
Years	Team	Apps	(Gls)
2007	Vancouver Whitecaps FC		
2008	Seattle Sounders		
2009	Sky Blue FC	0	(0)

International career
1999	United States U14		
2002	United States U19		
2006	United States U21		
2006–2008	United States U23		

Managerial career
- 2003–2009: FC Portland
- Mustang Soccer Club
- Walnut Creek Soccer Club
- 2009–2010: College Park Falcons (assistant)
- 2010: San Diego Toreros (assistant)
- 2011–: California Golden Bears (assistant)
- * Club domestic league appearances and goals

Corinne Renae Callahan (née Alexander; born May 6, 1985) is an American soccer coach, artistic photographer and former goalkeeper.

== University career ==
Callahan had a standout career at the University of Portland from 2003 through 2006, where she backstopped the Pilots to the 2005 NCAA Division I national championship, capping off an undefeated season. She saved two penalty kicks in the penalty shootout of the semi-final match against Penn State; that performance helped to name her the NCAA tournament's Defensive Most Valuable Player.

At Portland, she became the program's all-time leader in saves with 263, shutouts with 39, and finished with a 0.59 goals against average (GAA), which is fifth in program history, earning All-American status.

== Professional career ==
After leaving Portland, Callahan moved on to the W-League, where she played for the Vancouver Whitecaps in 2007 and the Seattle Sounders in 2008.

On October 6, 2008, she was drafted in the first round (seventh overall) by Sky Blue FC in the 2008 WPS General Draft. She remained on the roster for Sky Blue in WPS throughout the 2009 season, earning a winner's medal for the inaugural WPS Championship.

== International career ==
Callahan has won caps for the United States at the under-21 and under-23 levels. For the U-21s, she started every match in the 2007 Nordic Cup, and returned to the Nordic Cup with the U-23 team in 2006, 2007, and 2008.

== Photography ==
Callahan is the founder of a photography site, Cori Alexander Photography, which displays her portfolio containing a number of galleries. These galleries include images of nature settings, bridges such as the Golden Gate Bridge and the Brooklyn Bridge, and an ongoing collection titled "365", designed to capture one moment for every day of the year.

== Personal life ==
Callahan's brother, Clint Alexander, is the director of East Coast casting for the Fox Broadcasting Company. Her mother works for the Contra Costa Times, and her father has battled multiple sclerosis for many years. Portions of sales that she makes out of her photography site go to the National Multiple Sclerosis Society. She married Matt Callahan in May 2015, and has three children.
