= Gotham FC =

Soccer team

- Full name: Gotham Football Club
- Nickname: The Bats
- Founded: 2006; 20 years ago, as Jersey Sky Blue
- Stadium: Sports Illustrated Stadium; Harrison, New Jersey
- Capacity: 25,000
- Owners: Phil and Tammy Murphy; Carolyn Tisch Blodgett; Steven H. Temares; Kristin Bernert; Eli Manning; Sue Bird; Karen Bryant; Bobby Cho; Ed Nalbandian
- Chair: Tammy Murphy
- Head coach: Juan Carlos Amorós
- League: National Women's Soccer League
- 2026: Regular season: 1st of 16; Playoffs: Semi-Finals
- Website: gothamfc.com
Home colors	Away colors	Third colors

Gotham Football Club is an American professional soccer team based in the New York metropolitan area that competes in the National Women's Soccer League (NWSL). Founded in 2006 as Jersey Sky Blue, the team was known as Sky Blue FC from 2008 until 2020, and as NJ/NY Gotham FC from 2021 onwards. A founding member of the NWSL in 2013, Sky Blue FC also played in Women's Professional Soccer (WPS) from 2009 to 2011. They won the NWSL Championship in 2023 and 2025.

== History ==
=== 2006–2008: Establishment ===
Following the growth of women's soccer in the United States in the 1990s, the first attempt at a fully professional women's league, the Women's United Soccer Association (WUSA), was founded in 2000. However, after playing just three seasons the WUSA folded in 2003. Almost immediately following the folding of the WUSA, attempts were made to relaunch the league, although each of these initially came to naught. Finally, in December 2006, an agreement was reached to establish a new professional women's league, consisting of teams from Chicago, St. Louis, Dallas, Los Angeles, and Washington, D.C., as well as an undetermined sixth city located somewhere in the Western United States. Originally planned to begin play in 2008, the launch of this new league, dubbed Women's Professional Soccer (WPS), was subsequently pushed back to 2009. Boston and the New York/New Jersey metropolitan area were also selected to host clubs to participate in the inaugural WPS season.

Sky Blue FC was originally founded in 2006 as Jersey Sky Blue, playing in the USL W-League in 2007, a semi-professional league that served as part of the second division of women's soccer in the United States. Future governor of New Jersey Phil Murphy and his wife Tammy Murphy were co-founders of the team, alongside businessman Steven H. Temares, Francesco Prandoni and Thomas Hofstetter. The Murphys would later claim that their motivation in founding the club was as an example to their daughter, in order to prove that there was a viable pathway for women in the United States to play professional soccer. By September 2007, the club had been selected to fulfill the New York/New Jersey slot in Women's Professional Soccer and rebranded as Sky Blue FC. Following this move, the Jersey Sky Blue name initially remained in use for a feeder team in the W-League, although it later rebranded as the Hudson Valley Quickstrike Lady Blues. Co-founder Thomas Hofstetter, who served as president of Sky Blue FC until 2013, also served as chairman of the feeder team until their folding in 2010. As of 2018, Phil Murphy was a majority shareholder of the team.

Sky Blue FC named Ian Sawyers as its first head coach and general manager on March 5, 2008. However, it was not until September 9, 2008, that the New York/New Jersey outfit was officially unveiled under the name Sky Blue FC. One week later, the U.S. women's national team allocation took place with Heather O'Reilly, Natasha Kai, and Christie Pearce allocated to Sky Blue FC.

On September 24, the 2008 WPS International Draft was held. Sky Blue FC drafted Australia national team forward Sarah Walsh in the first round, Brazil national team members Rosana and Ester in the second and third rounds respectively, finished with Canada national team midfielder Kelly Parker in the fourth round. In addition to these picks, Sky Blue FC also named Australia national team midfielder Collette McCallum and England national team defender Anita Asante as post-draft discovery players on September 26, 2008, and October 2, 2008, respectively, and were awarded their WPS playing rights.

To further assign player rights, on October 6 the 2008 WPS General Draft took place. Sky Blue FC drafted Cori Alexander, Keeley Dowling, Kacey White, and Jenny Hammond. Ian Sawyers closed out 2008 by choosing Kelly Lindsey to be his assistant coach on December 3.

The new year brought new players. On January 16, the 2009 WPS Draft was held. Sky Blue FC drafted Yael Averbuch, Meghan Schnur, Karen Bardsley, Christie Shaner, Julianne Sitch, Jen Buczkowski, Zhang Ouying, Mary Therese McDonnell, Mele French, and Fanta Cooper.

=== 2008–2020: Sky Blue FC ===
==== 2009–2011: Women's Professional Soccer ====
===== Unlikely champions, 2009 =====
Sky Blue FC kicked off its inaugural season on April 5, 2009, dropping a 2–0 decision to Los Angeles Sol at TD Bank Ballpark in Bridgewater Township, New Jersey. It played its next game at the venue before moving permanently to Yurcak Field on the campus of Rutgers University.

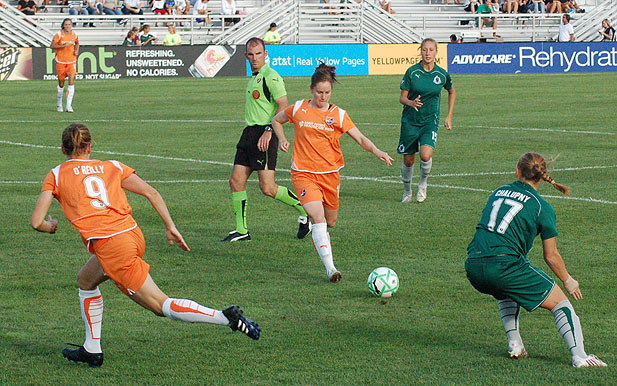
Sky Blue FC battle in St. Louis during the 2009 postseason

The team stuttered to one win and two draws in their first six games, scoring only 3 goals in the process, before head coach and general manager Ian Sawyers was suspended indefinitely by the team for disagreements on May 23, 2009. He was eventually relieved of his duties as head coach and general manager on May 28, 2009. In his absence, Kelly Lindsey stepped in as the interim and slowly started to turn around Sky Blue FC's on-field fortunes. She was eventually permanently installed as head coach on June 19, 2009, by then General Manager Gerry Marrone.

Lindsey's time at the helm was short-lived as she abruptly resigned from her position on July 30, 2009. She had won five games and drawn three others in her twelve total matches before Christie Rampone was named the second interim of the year and third head coach overall by Marrone. Her position also included playing on the field and she was the first player/manager in WPS history. Rampone led Sky Blue FC into 4th position and secured the final playoff spot for the 2009 playoffs. Sky Blue FC upended both Washington Freedom and Saint Louis Athletica to make the championship game against Los Angeles Sol. A 16th minute Heather O'Reilly strike earned Sky Blue FC the championship on August 22, 2009, beating the Sol on their own home field of The Home Depot Center in Carson, California.

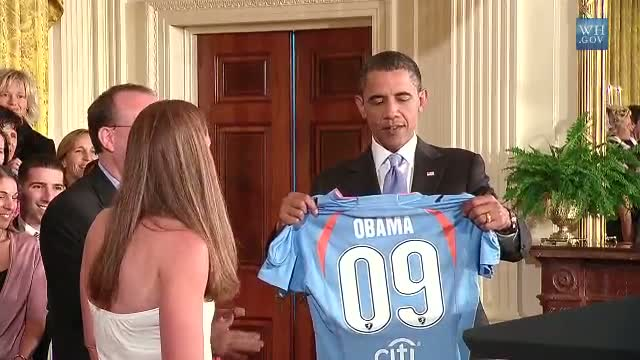
President Obama welcomed Sky Blue to the White House following their championship season.

Sky Blue's victory was seen as an upset, and later described as "an all-time underdog story." Sky Blue were later invited to the White House, where President Barack Obama hailed their success in the inaugural WPS season.

===== Down to Earth, 2010–2011 =====
With two additional teams, Atlanta Beat and Philadelphia Independence, joining the league for 2010, Sky Blue FC were destined to lose players from their championship-winning side. On September 15, the 2009 WPS Expansion Draft was held with Jen Buczkowski moving to Philadelphia and Noelle Keselica headed to Atlanta.

Sky Blue FC announced on September 29, 2009, that former Finnish National Team player Pauliina Miettinen would be head coach of the team for the 2010 season after completing her coaching duties with PK-35 Vantaa.

Sky Blue FC started its title defense on April 11, 2010, when it hosted the Chicago Red Stars at Yurcak Field. The team wasted little time in gaining its first goal on the young season, with forward Tasha Kai scoring on a fourth-minute strike to lead her team to an eventual 1–0 victory. Sky Blue FC found itself having some trouble tallying goals as the season progressed and held a 5–6–3 record when head coach Pauliina Miettinen was relieved of her duties. Immediately replacing her was assistant coach Rick Stainton, who led the team to a 2–4–4 record the rest of the way. After settling for three draws to conclude its sophomore campaign, Sky Blue FC finished the year in fifth place in the regular season standings and just missed the postseason.

The 2011 season marked the first at the helm by decorated women's soccer coach Jim Gabarra, who had spent the past decade with the Washington Freedom. Prior to the start of the regular season, Sky Blue FC headed to Turkey for the preseason, playing to the finals of the Alanya International Women's Tournament of Champions, where it fell to team partner LdB FC Malmö, 1–0. Also participating in the tournament were Russian side FK Energiya and Danish club Fortuna Hjørring (who Sky Blue FC defeated in a penalty shootout in the semifinals).

Sky Blue FC kicked off the WPS regular season on April 10, 2011, at Yurcak Field, playing the Philadelphia Independence to a 2–2 draw. The team then hit the road for three games, suffering three consecutive defeats, before returning home for a pair of wins. After two more draws and another victory, Sky Blue FC found itself amid the longest unbeaten streak in franchise history (five matches). The team kicked off that streak on May 21, 2011, with a 3–0 win over the Atlanta Beat, its then-largest margin of victory.

The club went 1–2 in its next three games before entering the final four matches of the regular season. After suffering defeats in each of those games, Sky Blue FC came up just short of the playoffs after finishing even with the Boston Breakers for the final postseason spot (Boston took the season tiebreaker).

After the WPS announced the suspension of the 2012 season, Sky Blue FC announced a partnership with the New Jersey Wildcats of the W-League, which included sharing coaching staff.

==== 2013–2020: National Women's Soccer League ====
===== Jim Gabarra era, 2013–2015 =====
In November 2012, it was announced that Sky Blue FC would be one of eight teams in a new women's professional soccer league sponsored by the United States Soccer Federation, the Canadian Soccer Association and the Mexican Football Federation. The league, known as the National Women's Soccer League, began play in spring 2013.

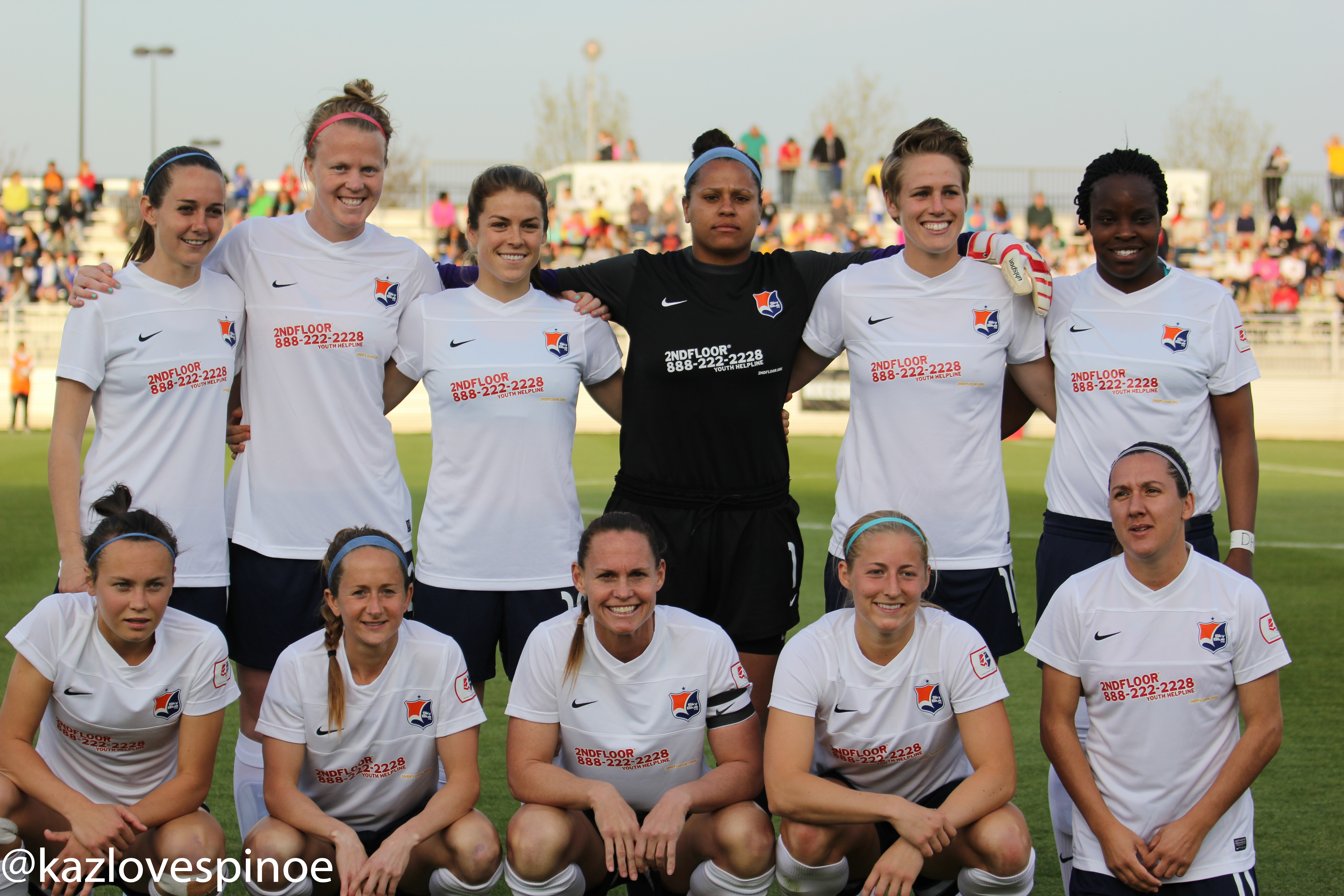
Sky Blue FC's lineup before a game against the Washington Spirit during the 2013 season.

For the 2013 season, Sky Blue were allocated seven players from North American federations, including Kelley O'Hara, Jillian Loyden, Christie Rampone, and Sophie Schmidt. On May 19, the club recorded their third consecutive victory and their fifth overall, marking the club's best-ever start to a season. On June 1, 2013, the team extended their run of consecutive victories to five with a 5–1 win over the Boston Breakers at Yurcak Field. In so doing, Sky Blue became the first team to score five goals in a single match in the nascent National Women's Soccer League. The team's form later slumped in the second half of the regular season, though Sky Blue ultimately finished in 4th place, earning a spot in the playoffs for the first time since 2009. Sky Blue were later eliminated in the first round of the playoffs, suffering a 2–0 defeat to the Western New York Flash.

The following season, Sky Blue failed to win any of their opening four matches. After defeating the Boston Breakers on May 3, Sky Blue again went on a winless streak until June 25, when they secured a 2–1 victory over the Portland Thorns. The 2014 season ended with a five-game win streak, though this proved insufficient to overcome earlier poor form and Sky Blue finished the season in 6th place, failing to qualify for the playoffs.

The 2015 season was similarly marred by poor form. After winning their opening match of the season, Sky Blue went on a winless streak until July 11. The game marked the debut for Australian international Sam Kerr, who scored the winning goal. Sky Blue ultimately finished the season in 8th place, having won only five games out of 20, and once more failing to qualify for the playoffs.

Following the 2015 season, head coach Jim Gabarra reached an agreement with Sky Blue to be released from his contract, having agreed terms to join the Washington Spirit. Gabarra's assistant, Christy Holly, was later named his successor for the 2016 season.

===== Christy Holly era, 2016–2017 =====
Sky Blue FC opened its 2016 season at Seattle Reign in thrilling fashion on Sunday, April 17, 2016, winning 2–1 and handing two-time defending NWSL Shield winner its first-ever home loss at Memorial Stadium. The Reign were unbeaten at Memorial Stadium over the previous two seasons Sky Blue FC started six players who had never logged a single NWSL minute before that night. By the end of the season they had racked up with 26 points in 7th place. Playing twenty games this season, they ended up with seven wins, eight losses, and five draws. They scored 24 goals and had 30 against them. Sky Blue midfielder Raquel Rodríguez was named 2016 NWSL Rookie of the Year.

After beginning with a 1–1 draw against Seattle Reign, the 2017 season got off to an uneven start. Sky Blue recorded alternating wins and losses in their next four games. Over the opening 18 matches of the season, Sky Blue recorded only two draws, compared to 7 wins and 9 defeats. Despite these results, Sky Blue were in 3rd place as late as July 15. Ultimately, in 2017, Sky Blue had its most successful season since 2014. They finished in sixth place, but were in playoff contention until mid September. Despite these successes, head coach Christy Holly unexpectedly stepped down as coach on August 16, 2017.

===== Instability, scandals, and rebuilding, 2017–2019 =====
Holly's departure was followed by veteran defender Christie Pearce announcing she would miss the remainder of the season due to injury on August 18. Following Holly's abrupt departure, assistant manager Dave Hodgson was appointed interim head coach.

On August 19, 2017, Sky Blue overcame a 3–0 deficit, to defeat the Seattle Reign 5–4. In that game Sam Kerr became the first player in NWSL history to score 4 goals in one game. Kerr enjoyed a breakout season in 2017, she broke the single season goal scoring record by scoring 17 goals and won the golden boot. Kerr was also awarded the 2017 NWSL MVP award.

Denise Reddy was appointed as the new head coach on November 15, 2017. Sky Blue began the off-season by trading several of their key players. They dealt Taylor Lytle and USWNT defender Kelley O'Hara to the Utah Royals on December 29, 2017. Then at the 2018 NWSL College Draft they traded Nikki Stanton and 2017 NWSL MVP Sam Kerr to the Chicago Red Stars. Sky Blue received forward Katie Johnson and defender Rebekah Stott from the Seattle Reign in exchange for the rights to forward Caitlin Foord. They also added two-time FIFA Player of the year Carli Lloyd in the trade for Sam Kerr.

The results of the field were not good for Sky Blue as they finished in last place with a record of 1–17–6. They broke the NWSL record for the longest winless streak (23 games) as they didn't earn a victory until the final game of the season.

During this time, the club was plagued with reports of poor off-field conditions. The training facilities lacked running water, working toilets, and showers, leading players to take post-game ice baths in garbage cans. The team reneged on its promise to provide housing for some players, and those who were accommodated found the conditions unacceptable. Players had to cover broken windows with cardboard, and some were placed with host families who expected them to babysit. Players also accused the club of also trying to cut travel costs at their expense. Players were forced into early check-outs at hotels, sometimes hours before they had to leave for a game. Between the poor training conditions and ownership they saw as distant, players started referring to Sky Blue as "a semi-pro team".

These off-field issues, coupled with Sky Blue's poor results, led to the club being described as "falling apart, on the field and off".

The 2018 season did include promising rookie seasons from Imani Dorsey and Savannah McCaskill. Dorsey scored 4 goals in 13 games and McCaskill had 3 goals and 3 assists. Both players were voted as finalists for the 2018 NWSL Rookie of the year. Dorsey won the award, becoming the second Sky Blue player to win the award after Raquel Rodríguez won it in 2016.

Following the disappointments of the preceding two seasons, the 2019 season got off to a poor start. Before the season even began, Hailie Mace and Julia Ashley declined to sign for the club despite being drafted, citing the team's mismanagement. Sky Blue then failed to win any of their opening nine matches, drawing two and losing seven. Head coach Denise Reddy was subsequently relieved of her duties. At the time of her dismissal, Reddy had won only one of thirty-three matches in charge of the club. Goalkeeping coach Hugo Macedo was named interim head coach following Reddy's dismissal. In his first game in charge, Macedo guided Sky Blue to a 2–1 win over the Chicago Red Stars, their first victory in an away game since September 2017. Under Macedo, Sky Blue amassed a 4–2–4 record. However, on September 4, Macedo returned to his previous role of goalkeeping coach and was replaced as interim head coach by Freya Coombe. Under Coombe, Sky Blue went on to win only one of their final five games of the season. Having had three head coaches in a single season for the second time, Sky Blue finished the 2019 season with a record of 5 wins, 5 draws, and 14 defeats. This saw them finish 8th in the table, ahead of only the Orlando Pride, and failing to qualify for the playoffs for the sixth consecutive season.

Off the field, in February co-owner and First Lady of New Jersey Tammy Murphy announced she would be taking an "active role" in the club. In the same statement, Murphy announced that the club had taken steps to improve player housing, as well as relocating its administrative offices, and expanding the size of the club's staff. Murphy also committed to improving Sky Blue's training facilities. Longtime president and General Manager Tony Novo resigned in April, with reports alleging that Novo was forced out of the club. Alyse LaHue, formerly General Manager of the Chicago Red Stars, was named interim GM following Novo's resignation. LaHue was later made permanent General Manager on September 3.

In November 2019, Sky Blue announced that they had reached an agreement with Major League Soccer club the New York Red Bulls to play their home matches for the following season at Red Bull Arena. In December, Freya Coombe's appointment as head coach was made permanent.

===== A fresh start, 2020 =====
Following their previous announcement of a groundshare arrangement, in February 2020 Sky Blue announced that they had agreed a deal to share training facilities with the New York Red Bulls. That same month, Ed Nalbandian joined the club as minority owner and was appointed Vice Chair. Heading into the 2020 season, Sky Blue's off field developments over the preceding year were perceived as having turned around the club's culture. The club also took steps to overhaul their roster, bringing in thirteen new players, such as Mallory Pugh, McCall Zerboni, and Margaret Purce, for what was described as a "new-look Sky Blue." These changes led to a belief that the club "was set to make leaps and bounds" and would "compete for playoff spots in due time." The outbreak of the COVID-19 pandemic halted the new season's momentum before it could even begin, however. On March 12, the team's originally scheduled preseason was cancelled. The start date of the 2020 NWSL season was also pushed back before being cancelled altogether and replaced by the 2020 NWSL Challenge Cup.

Veteran defender Caprice Dydasco, new arrival Pugh, and star midfielder Carli Lloyd were ruled out of the Challenge Cup through injury. Midfielder Madison Tiernan also picked up an injury shortly before the start of the tournament. These absences, coupled with the extensive changes that had been made to the club in a short space of time, led to Sky Blue entering the Challenge Cup as "the true underdog". The truncated season was seen as pushing back the club's growth, while at the same time the tournament was perceived as "more of a development opportunity." Heading into the tournament, the team were perceived as least likely to reach the final.

Following a 0–0 draw with the OL Reign in their opening game of the tournament and a 1–0 defeat to Utah Royals, Sky Blue recorded a 2–0 win over the Houston Dash, which saw them rise to 2nd in the table. A subsequent 2–0 defeat to the North Carolina Courage saw them slump to 7th, and Sky Blue were pitted against 2nd place Washington Spirit in the quarter-final. The Spirit were perceived as the favorite for the match, though Sky Blue ultimately advanced after winning 4–3 on penalties. In the semi-final, Sky Blue were pitted against the Chicago Red Stars, who had finished as runners-up in the 2019 NWSL Championship. After conceding three goals in the opening 60 minutes, Sky Blue rallied courtesy of a late goal from Evelyne Viens and an effort by Purce which forced an own goal by Julie Ertz. However, Sky Blue were unable to overcome the deficit and the club were eliminated in a 3–2 defeat. Despite these results, goalkeeper Kailen Sheridan was named the best goalkeeper of the tournament by the media, being awarded the Golden Glove. The Philadelphia Inquirer also wrote that Sky Blue's performance in the tournament "shows big potential for the future," and that "if general manager Alyse LaHue can keep her team's spine together, Sky Blue will enter 2021 with real potential to end its playoff drought."

Following the conclusion of the Challenge Cup, the NWSL announced the continuation of the season with the NWSL Fall Series. Per the rules of the series, Sky Blue were drawn into a three-team regional pod with the Washington Spirit and Chicago Red Stars. Sky Blue opened the Fall Series with a 2–1 victory over the Washington Spirit at Segra Field on September 5, though this was followed by a heavy 4–1 defeat to the Chicago Red Stars. Sky Blue then suffered a 1–0 defeat to the Washington Spirit in their first home game of the season, before closing out the Fall Series with a 3–1 victory at home over Chicago. These results ultimately saw Sky Blue finish the Fall Series in fourth place, just one point behind the third-placed Washington Spirit.

=== 2021–present: NJ/NY Gotham FC ===
==== 2021-2027 Red Bull Arena ====
===== The Rebrand (2021-2022) =====
In April 2021, Sky Blue officially changed its name to Gotham FC, "Gotham" being a nickname for New York City. Carli Lloyd announced her retirement from professional soccer on August 16, 2021, indicating the current NJ/NY Gotham season would be her last season. In September 2021, former Sky Blue player Nadia Nadim accused management of forging her signature on a contract extension so they could trade her to the Portland Thorns in early 2016.

Lloyd joined the ownership group on April 27, 2022. On May 4, 2022, NBA player Kevin Durant and investor Rich Kleiman announced their minority investment into Gotham FC via their investment company Thirty Five Ventures. On July 29, 2022, WNBA player Sue Bird joined Gotham FC's ownership group as a minority owner, consultant, and advisor. On August 10, 2022, Gotham FC announced the addition of former New York Giants quarterback Eli Manning and Giants chief commercial officer Pete Guelli to its ownership group as minority owners. The investments raised the club's valuation to an estimated $40 million.

On August 11, 2022, Gotham FC fired head coach Scott Parkinson following a 4–8–0 start to the 2022 season and announced an immediate search for a new coach to be hired for the 2023 season.

===== Dynasty Years (2023-present) =====
After finishing the 2022 season in last place, Gotham FC appointed Juan Carlos Amóros as the new head coach. In the NWSL Draft, Gotham FC made several trades to acquire Lynn Williams from Kansas City Current in exchange for the 2nd pick and send Paige Monaghan to Racing Louisville in exchange for the 4th pick, which they used to draft 2023 Rookie of the Year winner Jenna Nighswonger. Prior to the start of the season, veteran defender Ali Krieger announced that she would be retiring at the end of the 2023 NWSL season. Gotham FC finished the regular season in 6th place, securing the final playoff spot on the last day of the season. In the playoffs, Gotham FC defeated North Carolina Courage 0-3 and Portland Thorns FC 0–1 to advance to their first ever NWSL Championship Game. On November 11, 2023, Gotham FC won their first NWSL Championship, the team's first title since the 2009 WPS Championship, by a score of 1–2 over OL Reign with first half goals by Lynn Williams and Esther Gonzalez.

In the 2024 season, Gotham finished third in the league, defeating Portland Thorns FC in the quarterfinals 2–1. In the semifinals, Gotham faced the Washington Spirit, in this match goals from Esther González and Hal Hershfelt sent the match to penalties, where Gotham lost 3–0.

On May 24, 2025, Gotham won the inaugural edition of the CONCACAF W Champions Cup, defeating Tigres UANL 1–0 in the final.

On November 22, 2025, Gotham won the 2025 NWSL Championship, defeating the Washington Spirit 1–0 at PayPal Park in San Jose, California. Midfielder Rose Lavelle scored the winning goal and was declared the game's MVP.

On July 7, 2026, after over 2 decades in New Jersey, it was announced that Gotham would move into the brand new Etihad Park in Queens by the start of the 2028 NWSL season and have a groundshare arrangement with New York City FC of MLS.

Gotham FC defeated rivals Washington Spirit 1-0 in front of a sold out crowd of 42,175 at Citi Field on July 15, 2026 with a first half goal by Rose Lavelle. This crowd set the record for the largest women's sporting event in New York City and the second largest single game attendance record in the NWSL. This match marked the return of forward Sam Kerr when she came off the bench and subbed in at the 64th minute. The Australian played for Sky Blue FC from 2015 before being traded after a record breaking season in 2017. Kerr returns as the NWSL's all-time leading regular season goal scorer, a record she has held since 2017. She is under contract with Gotham through 2030.

On November 1, 2026 Gotham secured their first NWSL Shield by defeating Utah Royals by a score of 2-0 on the final day of the season. Midge Purce assisted on both goals with Guro Reiten scoring in the 9th minute and Jaedyn Shaw sealing the match in the 80th minute.

Following a 1-0 win over Seattle Reign FC in the quarterfinals, Gotham FC relocated its semifinal match in the 2026 NWSL playoffs from Sports Illustrated Stadium to Icahn Stadium, a 5,000-seat track-and-field venue on Randall's Island, New York City citing poor pitch conditions that had marred the quarterfinal match. Players and coaches from both Gotham and Seattle Reign FC had criticized the surface after the quarterfinal, which followed a rugby match and a Red Bulls match at the stadium; the league had earlier fined Gotham $10,000 over pitch conditions at its regular-season finale. Gotham plays at the stadium as a tenant of the Red Bulls, which operate the publicly owned facility under a lease from the Hudson County Improvement Authority, an autonomous public agency created by the county's Board of County Commissioners; the arrangement dates to a 2016 tax settlement in which Red Bull transferred ownership of the stadium and land to the authority and agreed to pay it annual rent. The Red Bulls kept a friendly against Club América at the stadium the night before the semifinal. Gotham was able to provide shuttle buses from Willowbrook Mall to the match. The Metropolitan Transportation Authority doubled service on the M35 and the city and club were able to arrange ferry service from East 34th Street Ferry Landing. The club also promoted watch parties for fans who were unable to obtain tickets to the match, which had sold out shortly after they went on sale to the general public. In the semifinal match, Gotham fell 1-2 to Kansas City Current.

Immediately following the end of the 2026 season, Jess Carter departed for Bay FC.

== Colors and crest ==
The club's visual identity has changed multiple times throughout its history. During their tenure in Women's Professional Soccer, Sky Blue FC's home colors were orange and their away colors were sky blue. Beginning with the 2013 season and the launch of the National Women's Soccer League, the club's home colors changed to midnight blue, while their away colors changed to a white shirt with midnight blue shorts. In 2015, the club's colors reverted to sky blue and orange, but with sky blue for their home jersey and orange for their away jersey. The following season, the club's home colors returned to midnight blue, while their away colors returned to sky blue. This pattern again emerged in following seasons, as the club's home jersey was sky blue in 2017 and 2018, but returned to midnight blue in 2019. The 2020 season marked yet another change, as the club's home colors became primarily black with sky blue accents. While their home and away strips as Sky Blue FC lacked a consistent visual identity, throughout this era the club's crest remained a blue, white, and orange shield emblazoned with the club's name. The addition of a blue star above the shield was to represent the club's victory in the 2009 Women's Professional Soccer championship.

Following the club's rebrand from Sky Blue FC to NJ/NY Gotham FC, a new crest and color scheme was announced. The club's new crest, a shield adorned by the crown of the Statue of Liberty, was designed by Matthew Wolff, who had previously designed for several MLS clubs as well as other professional clubs around the world. According to a club statement, the crown represents the club's ambitions to become an international club. The lettering on the crest contains a hybrid letter Y and letter J, reflecting the club's name, location, and fanbase. The new kit is similarly representative. The blue sash running diagonally across the kit harkens back to the team's roots as Sky Blue FC. The sash also symbolizes the Hudson River, a visual representation of the "/" in NJ/NY, as it flows between New Jersey and New York. Following the rebrand, the official colors of Gotham FC are "Sky Blue", "Gotham Black", and "Cloud White", representing the club's original name, its current name, and the name of the supporters group.

=== Kit history ===
Selection of Gotham kits through history
The all orange home jersey worn from 2009–2011	Midnight blue and white were adopted as the club's home colors from 2013–2014	The sky blue jersey worn in 2017	Black and sky blue were adopted as the club's colors in 2020	The inaugural Gotham FC home kit used in 2021–2022, known as the Colossal Kit.	Gotham FC 2023 kit

== Stadiums ==
- Yurcak Field (2009–2019)
- TD Bank Ballpark (2 games, 2009)
- MSU Soccer Park at Pittser Field (2 games in 2020)
- Sports Illustrated Stadium (2 games in 2019, 2020–present)
- Icahn Stadium (1 game in 2025, 1 game in 2026)
- Citi Field (1 game in 2026)
- Etihad Park (2028–future)

== Training facility ==
Since its founding as Sky Blue FC, Gotham FC has operated without a dedicated training facility, renting or sharing various fields in New Jersey, including those of youth programs and the New York Red Bulls Academy.

On June 10, 2026, the club announced plans to build its first permanent training facility by repurposing and renovating the former New York Red Bulls training site in Whippany. The project, estimated to cost $35 million, is privately funded and operates under a 15-year lease starting September 1, 2026. Designed by SHoP Architects with input from players and coaching staff, construction is scheduled to begin in late summer 2026, with an estimated completion date in 2027.

Plans for the site include three grass pitches, one heated, with a fourth full-size indoor field subject to permit approval. The interior design features a 3,000-square-foot gym, recovery and hydrotherapy rooms, a player lounge, dining space, a press room, and a content studio.

== Supporters ==
Cloud 9 is the official supporters group of Gotham FC. They stand in the supporters' section for home games (Section 101 of Red Bull Arena, behind the south-side goal), and travel to road games, singing songs and chants throughout the game. During the team's tenure at Yurcak Field, Cloud 9 stood and supported from Section 9 during home games.

== Rivalries ==
Gotham FC's primary rival is Washington Spirit. The two have clashed twice in the playoffs with Washington winning on penalties in the 2024 NWSL Semifinal and Gotham winning 1-0 in the 2025 NWSL Final. They also faced each other in the 2026 Queens Classic at CitiField with Gotham winning that match 1-0. In prior years, Gotham also had rivalries with Western New York Flash and Boston Breakers.

== Players and staff ==
=== Current squad ===
As of November 18, 2026

No.	Pos.	Nation	Player
1	GK	USA	Shelby Hogan
2	FW	USA	Jordynn Dudley
3	DF	BRA	Bruninha
4	DF	ESP	Leila Ouahabi
5	MF	IRL	Denise O'Sullivan (on loan from Liverpool)
6	DF	USA	Emily Sonnett
7	MF	USA	Jaelin Howell
8	MF	USA	Taryn Torres
10	MF	USA	Jaedyn Shaw
13	MF	USA	Savannah McCaskill
14	MF	ISR	Talia Sommer
15	DF	USA	Tierna Davidson (captain)
16	MF	USA	Rose Lavelle (vice-captain)
18	FW	NOR	Guro Reiten
19	DF	USA	Kayla Duran
20	FW	AUS	Sam Kerr
21	MF	USA	Sofia Cook
22	DF	USA	Mandy Freeman
23	FW	USA	Midge Purce
24	FW	USA	Andrea Kitahata
25	MF	USA	Meredith Speck
28	MF	USA	Tess Boade
29	FW	USA	Olivia Wingate
30	GK	GER	Ann-Katrin Berger
31	GK	USA	Teagan Wy

==== Out on loan ====
No.	Pos.	Nation	Player
12	GK	USA	Ryan Campbell (on loan to Lexington SC until December 31, 2026)
17	FW	USA	Mak Whitham (on loan to DC Power FC until December 31, 2026)
99	FW	ENG	Princess Ademiluyi (on loan to Ipswich Town until December 31, 2026)

=== Staff ===
As of March 29, 2025

Front office
Position	Name
General manager Head of soccer operations	(United States) Yael Averbuch West
Chief business officer	(United States) Ryan Dillon
Technical staff
Head coach	(Spain) Juan Carlos Amorós
Assistant head coach	(England) Andy Spence
Assistant coaches	(United States) Jen Lalor
Assistant coaches	(England) Shaun Harris
Assistant coaches	(England) Ak Lakhani
Assistant coaches	(Spain) Guillermo Amorós
Goalkeeper coach	(Australia) Brody Sams
Assistant goalkeeper coach	(United States) Michelle Betos

=== Head coaches ===
As of May 27, 2025

Only competitive matches (Note: Includes regular season, playoffs, domestic, continental, and international cups) are counted. Wins, losses, and draws are results at the final whistle; the results of penalty shootouts are not counted.

Name	Nationality	From	Until	Record								Honors
Name	Nationality	From	Until	P	W	D	L	GF	GA	GD	Win %	Honors
Ian Sawyers	(England)	March 5, 2008	May 23, 2009	6	1	2	3	3	5	−2	16.67	
Kelly Lindsey	(United States)	May 23, 2009	July 29, 2009	12	5	3	4	13	12	+1	41.67	
Christie Pearce	(United States)	July 30, 2009	September 29, 2009	5	4	0	1	6	4	+2	80.00	WPS Champions
Pauliina Miettinen	(Finland)	September 29, 2009	July 19, 2010	14	5	3	6	12	16	−4	35.71	
Rick Stainton	(United States)	July 19, 2010	October 7, 2010	10	2	4	4	8	15	−7	20.00	
Jim Gabarra	(United States)	October 7, 2010	October 14, 2015	84	29	29	26	68	87	−19	34.52	
Christy Holly	(Northern Ireland)	January 13, 2016	August 16, 2017	38	14	7	17	53	67	−14	36.84	
Dave Hodgson (interim)	(England)	August 16, 2017	November 15, 2017	6	3	1	2	13	14	−1	50.00	
Denise Reddy	(United States)	November 15, 2017	June 28, 2019	33	1	8	24	27	66	−39	3.03	
Christiane Lessa; Hugo Macedo (interim)	(Brazil) (Brazil)	June 28, 2019	September 4, 2019	10	4	2	4	10	13	−3	40.00	
Freya Coombe (interim)	(England)	September 4, 2019	December 17, 2019	5	1	1	3	5	9	−4	20.00	
Freya Coombe	(England)	December 17, 2019	August 29, 2021	31	10	11	10	33	32	+1	32.26	
Scott Parkinson	(England)	August 31, 2021	August 11, 2022	24	7	5	12	24	37	−13	29.17	
Hue Menzies (interim)	(England)	August 13, 2022	October 2, 2022	10	0	1	9	7	22	−15	0.00	
Juan Carlos Amorós	(Spain)	November 1, 2022	Present	81	43	19	19	126	67	+59	53.09	NWSL Champions CONCACAF W Champions Cup

=== Club captains ===
Period	Name
2009–2010	(United States) Christie Pearce
2011	(United States) Brittany Kolmel
2013–2017	(United States) Christie Pearce
2018	(United States) Carli Lloyd
2019–2020	(United States) Sarah Woldmoe
2021–2022	(United States) McCall Zerboni
2023	(United States) Ali Krieger
2024	(United States) Kelley O'Hara
2025	(United States) Tierna Davidson

== Honors ==
=== Major trophies ===
Type	Competition	Titles	Winning Seasons	Runners-up
Domestic	WPS Championship / NWSL Championship (Tier 1)	3	2009, 2023, 2025	
Domestic	NWSL Shield	1	2026	
Domestic	NWSL Challenge Cup	1	2026	2021, 2024
Regional	NWSL x Liga MX Femenil Summer Cup	0		2024
Continental	CONCACAF W Champions Cup	1^{s}	2024-25	

- record
- ^{s} shared record

=== Minor trophies ===
Invitational cup(s): (1)

- The Women's Cup
  - Champions (1): 2024 C

== Records ==
Statistics from competitive matches (regular season, playoffs, and domestic, continental, and international cups) only. Current players in bold.

=== Year-by-year ===
As of November 15, 2026

Season	Regular season									Playoffs	Challenge Cup	Summer Cup	CONCACAF Champions Cup	FIFA Champions Cup	Avg. attendance
Season	League	P	W	D	L	F	A	Pts	Pos	Playoffs	Challenge Cup	Summer Cup	CONCACAF Champions Cup	FIFA Champions Cup	Avg. attendance
2009	WPS	20	7	5	8	19	20	26	4th	**Champions**	Not held	Not held	Not held	Not held	3,651
2010	WPS	24	7	7	10	20	31	28	5th	DNQ	Not held	Not held	Not held	Not held	3,320
2011	WPS	18	5	4	9	24	29	19	5th	DNQ	Not held	Not held	Not held	Not held	2,033
2013	NWSL	22	10	6	6	31	26	36	4th	Semi-finals	Not held	Not held	Not held	Not held	1,664
2014	NWSL	24	9	7	8	30	37	34	6th	DNQ	Not held	Not held	Not held	Not held	1,640
2015	NWSL	20	5	7	8	22	28	22	8th	DNQ	Not held	Not held	Not held	Not held	2,189
2016	NWSL	20	7	5	8	24	30	26	7th	DNQ	Not held	Not held	Not held	Not held	2,162
2017	NWSL	24	10	3	11	42	51	33	6th	DNQ	Not held	Not held	Not held	Not held	2,613
2018	NWSL	24	1	6	17	21	52	9	9th	DNQ	Not held	Not held	Not held	Not held	2,532
2019	NWSL	24	5	5	14	20	34	20	8th	DNQ	Not held	Not held	Not held	Not held	3,338
2020	NWSL	Canceled due to the COVID-19 pandemic							4th (Note: Results of the 2020 NWSL Fall Series)	Canceled	Semi-finals	Not held	Not held	Not held	0 (Note: All games played behind closed doors due to the COVID-19 pandemic)
2021	NWSL	24	8	11	5	29	21	35	5th	Quarter-finals	Runners-up	Not held	Not held	Not held	3,793
2022	NWSL	22	4	1	17	16	46	13	12th	DNQ	Group stage	Not held	Not held	Not held	4,415
2023	NWSL	22	8	7	7	25	24	31	6th	**Champions**	Group stage	Not held	Not held	Not held	6,293
2024	NWSL	26	17	5	4	41	20	56	3rd	Semi-finals	Runners-up	Runners-up	**Champions**	Not held	8,550
2025	NWSL	26	9	9	8	35	25	36	8th	**Champions**	DNQ	Not held	4th Place	Not held	8,892
2026	NWSL	30	18	7	5	39	23	61	**1st**	Semi-finals	**Champions**	Not held	4th Place	Third Place	11,277

=== Most appearances ===
As of May 27, 2025.

Players with most appearances for Gotham FC
Rank	Player	Years	League (Note: includes WPS & NWSL, regular season and playoffs.)	Cup	Total
1	**Mandy Freeman**	2017–	101	18	119
2	Christie Pearce	2009–2010; 2013–2017	116	0	116
2	Sarah Woldmoe	2015–2020	106	10	116
4	Erica Skroski	2016–2021	96	10	106
5	Kelley O'Hara	2013–2017; 2023-2024	91	2	93
6	Kailen Sheridan	2017–2021	80	10	90
6	Imani Dorsey	2018–2023	72	18	90
8	Taylor Lytle	2013–2017	82	0	82
9	Paige Monaghan	2019–2022	57	21	78
10	Raquel Rodríguez	2016–2019	76	0	76

=== Top goalscorers ===
As of May 27, 2025.

Matches played appear in brackets.

Rank	Player	Years	Goals
1	**Sam Kerr**	2015–2017	**28** (40)
2	**Margaret Purce**	2020–	**21** (77)
3	Esther González	2023–2026	**18** (37)
4	Carli Lloyd	2010; 2018–2021	**17** (52)
5	Natasha Kai	2009–2010; 2016–2017	**15** (58)
5	Kelley O'Hara	2013–2017	**15** (75)
7	Ifeoma Onumonu	2020–2023	**14** (60)
8	Lynn Williams	2023–2024	**13** (37)
8	Nadia Nadim	2014–2015	**13** (24)
10	Mónica Ocampo	2013–2015	**11** (35)
10	Sarah Woldmoe	2015–2020	**11** (116)

=== Top scorers by season ===
As of November 9, 2026.

Season	Nat.	Player	Goals
2009	(United States)	Natasha Kai	6
2010	(United States)	Natasha Kai	5
2010	(Finland)	Laura Österberg Kalmari	5
2011	(United States)	Casey Loyd	5
2013	(Mexico)	Mónica Ocampo	8
2014	(United States)	Kelley O'Hara	7
2014	(Denmark)	Nadia Nadim	7
2015	(Denmark)	Nadia Nadim	6
2015	(Australia)	**Sam Kerr**	6
2016	(Australia)	**Sam Kerr**	5
2017	(Australia)	**Sam Kerr**	17
2018	(United States)	Carli Lloyd	4
2018	(United States)	Imani Dorsey	4
2018	(Mexico)	Katie Johnson	4
2019	(United States)	Carli Lloyd	8
2020	(United States)	Paige Monaghan	3
2020	(Nigeria)	Ifeoma Onumonu	3
2021	(United States)	**Margaret Purce**	11
2022	(United States)	Paige Monaghan	3
2022	(United States)	**Margaret Purce**	3
2022	(United States)	McCall Zerboni	3
2023	(United States)	Lynn Williams	7
2024	(Spain)	Esther González	9
2025	(Spain)	Esther González	13
2026	(United States)	**Jaedyn Shaw**	11

== Broadcasting ==
Starting in April 2017, Sky Blue FC games were streamed exclusively by Go90 for American audiences and via the NWSL website for international viewers. For the 2017 season, the team was featured in the nationally televised Lifetime NWSL Game of the Week broadcasts on May 13, May 20, July 1, and August 12, 2017.

Previous seasons' matches were streamed live on YouTube, available around the world. The announcers were Corey Cohen on play-by-play and Dan Lauletta on color commentary with Evan Davis hosting the halftime show and NJ Discover handling production.

The NWSL announced that it has entered into a three-year media agreement with CBS Sports and the video game-oriented streaming service Twitch on March 11, 2020. Since 2023, matches have additionally been televised locally on MSG Network.

== See also ==
- List of top-division football clubs in CONCACAF countries
- List of professional sports teams in the United States and Canada
