= Kacey White =

American soccer player (born 1984)

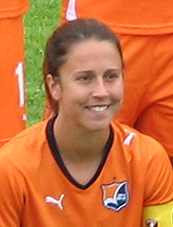
- White with Sky Blue FC

Personal information
- Full name: Kacey Dell White
- Date of birth: April 27, 1984 (age 42)
- Place of birth: Aurora, Colorado, United States
- Height: 5 ft 4 in (1.63 m)
- Position: Midfielder

College career
Years	Team	Apps	(Gls)
2002–2005	North Carolina Tar Heels		

Senior career*
Years	Team	Apps	(Gls)
2005	New Jersey Wildcats	14	(5)
2006	Bälinge IF		
2007	AIK		
2007	Bälinge IF		
2009–10	Sky Blue FC	43	(3)
2011	magicJack	1	(0)
2011	Atlanta Beat	9	(1)

International career
- United States U21
2006–2009	United States	18	(0)

Managerial career
- 2007: Texas Tech (assistant)
- 2008: SMU (assistant)
- 2012–2013: Oklahoma (assistant)
- 2014: Green Bay Phoenix
- 2017: Xavier Musketeers
- * Club domestic league appearances and goals

Kacey Dell White (formerly Burke; born April 27, 1984) is an American professional soccer coach and former player. A midfielder, she made 18 appearances the United States national team.

== Early life ==
Born in Aurora, Colorado, White began playing soccer at the age of five. She attended Grace Preparatory Academy in Arlington, Texas, where she was named to the NSCAA All-America squad in 2001 and was a Parade All-American selection. White played club soccer for the Solar '84 and Defeeters '84. She also played for the regional Olympic Development Program (ODP) team from 1997 to 2002.

=== North Carolina Tar Heels ===
White attended the University of North Carolina at Chapel Hill from 2002 to 2005. She finished her career having scored 22 goals and serving 58 assists for a total of 102 points during her collegiate career. She also ranked fifth on North Carolina's all-time career assists list and fourth at the national level in 2003 with 16 assists. She was a starting midfielder for the Tar Heels when they won the 2003 College Cup. In 2005, White earned Most Valuable Player (MVP) honors at the Atlantic Coast Conference (ACC) tournament.

== Playing career ==
=== Club ===
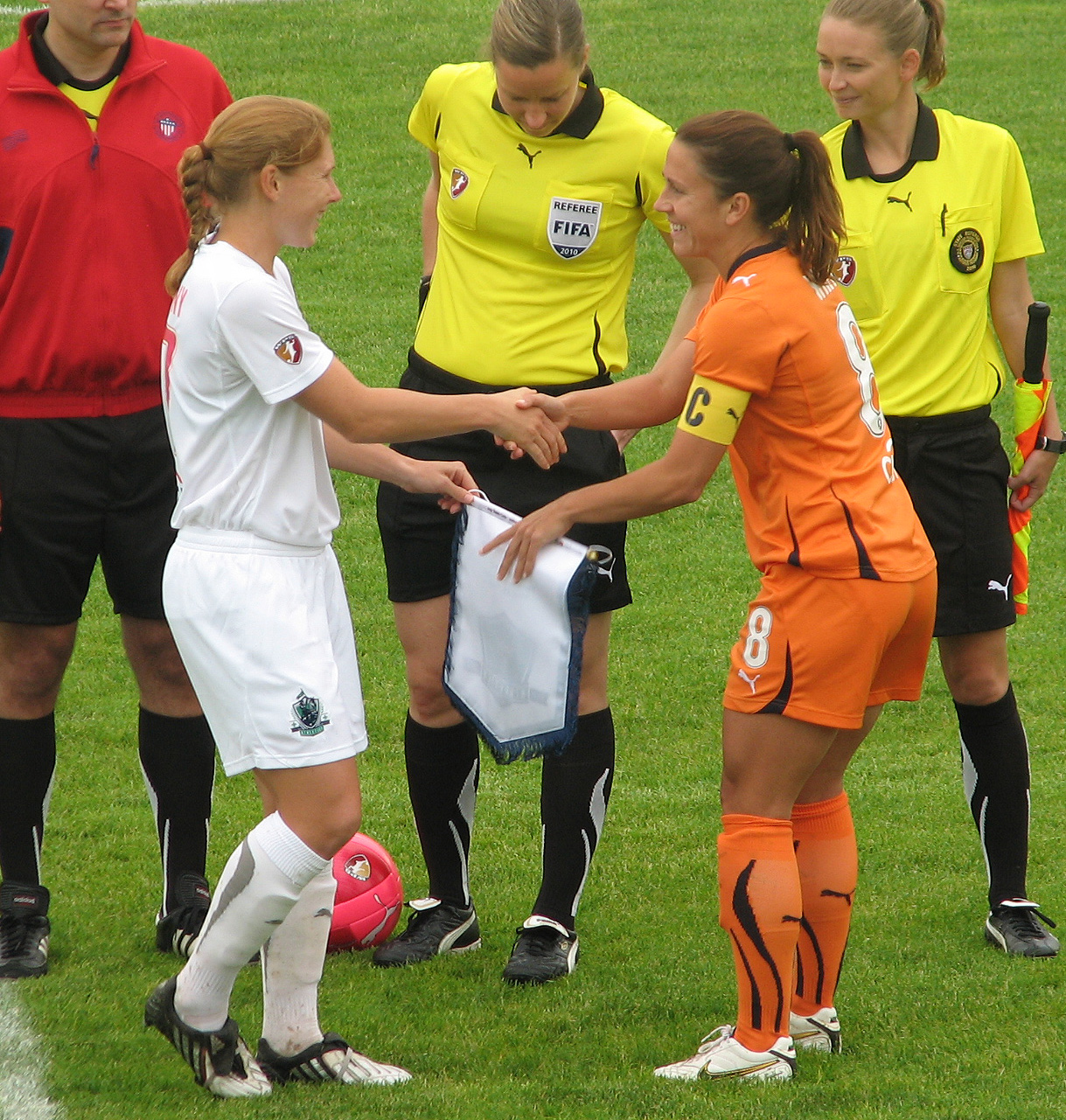
White exchanges crests with Lori Chalupny of the St. Louis Athletica, 2010.

White signed with Bälinge IF in Sweden for the 2006 season and was later named Uppland Forward of the Year. In 2007, she played for AIK in Sweden's Damallsvenskan.

In 2008, White was selected 21st overall during the 2009 WPS Draft by Sky Blue FC. She started in 19 of the 22 games she played during the inaugural season of the Women's Professional Soccer and scored three goals. After spending half of the season in last place, Sky Blue won the 2009 WPS championship title after defeating the Los Angeles Sol 1–0 during the final. She returned to Sky Blue during the 2010 season, starting 23 of 24 games.

White signed with magicJack, formerly the Washington Freedom for the 2011 season. She made one appearance for the team. In June, White was traded to the Atlanta Beat in exchange for a 2012 fourth round draft pick. She started in all nine of her appearances for the club during the 2011 season and scored a goal against her former team, magicJack on June 12.

=== International ===
White represented the United States as various youth levels, including the under-19 and under-21 national teams. With the under-21 team, she won the 2005 Nordic Cup in Sweden. On November 2, 2006, she debuted for the United States women's national soccer team during a match against the Netherlands during the Peace Queen Cup in South Korea. White was an alternate for the senior national team at the 2008 Summer Olympics in China.

== Coaching career ==
In 2012, White became an assistant coach for the Oklahoma Sooners women's soccer team. She was a volunteer assistant coach at Southern Methodist University in 2008 and an assistant coach at Texas Tech University in 2007. In 2015, she was added to the coaching staff of the Capital Area Soccer League for the U-15 to U-18 girls programs, effective for the Fall 2015 season.

On December 14, 2016 it was announced that she will become the new head coach of Women's soccer at Xavier University.

On April 18, 2017 it was announced that she resigned as Xavier head coach to take a position with US soccer.

On April 16, 2018, it was announced that White will serve as the Associate Development Academy Director for the West Florida Flames in Brandon, Florida.

On October 26, 2020, White was announced as the Girls Soccer Head Coach at Bishop McLaughlin Catholic High School in Spring Hill, Pasco County, Florida.

== Sports Diplomacy ==
In 2019, White traveled to Costa Rica with Amanda Cromwell as a Sports Envoy for the U.S. State Department's Sports Diplomacy Office. In Costa Rica, White and Cromwell coached a soccer clinic to advance Sports Diplomacy's mission of empowering girls in sports.

== Personal life ==
She married her husband Joe Burke in November 2012.

== Honors ==
North Carolina Tar Heels

- NCAA Division I women's soccer tournament: 2003
