= 2009 Washington Freedom season =

2009 season of American women's association football team

Washington Freedom
2009 season
- General manager: Chris Hummer
- Head coach: Jim Gabarra
- Stadium: Maryland SoccerPlex
- WSP: 3rd
- Top goalscorer: Abby Wambach (6)

The 2009 season is Washington Freedom's first season competing in the Women's Professional Soccer league, the top division of women's soccer in the United States, and seventh competitive season. The team was coached by Jim Gabarra who has led the team since its founding in 2001.

== Review ==
In January 2008, Washington was selected as one of the seven cities to launch Women’s Professional Soccer in spring 2009. The WPS would be the next iteration of a women’s professional league since the WUSA folded in 2003.

The Washington Freedom had been competing in the W-League since 2006, would begin the Washington franchise to field a WSP team. Still led by head coach Jim Gabarra, the coaching staff stayed intact transitioning to the new league. The initial player allocation aimed to keep players in preferred locations and best marketing potential, with the Freedom getting Abby Wambach, Cat Whitehill, and Ali Krieger (on loan from FFC Frankfurt).

The Freedom played in the league’s inaugural match on March 29, 2009, against Los Angeles Sol before a crowd of 14,382. They lost the match, 2–0, and struggled for the first three weeks. The Freedom picked up their first win of the WPS era back in California, beating FC Gold Pride, 3–4, thanks to a 90th-minute goal from Abby Wambach.

The season continued to be an up and down one with a strong run through June (going undefeated through 8 matches) followed by three consecutive losses. Winning four of their last five, the Freedom finished their first WPS regular season in 3rd place, earning their first playoff appearance.

The first round playoff match was a rematch of the last week of the season, where the Freedom defeated Sky Blue FC at home 3–1. Sky Blue would get revenge winning 2–1 at the Maryland SoccerPlex, thanks to an 85th-minute goal from Francielle.

== Club ==
=== Roster ===
The first-team roster of Washington Freedom.

Note: Flags indicate national team as defined under FIFA eligibility rules; some limited exceptions apply. Players may hold more than one non-FIFA nationality.

No.	Pos.	Nation	Player
1	GK	USA	Briana Scurry
3	MF	USA	Jill Gilbeau
4	DF	USA	Cat Whitehill
5	MF	USA	Joanna Lohman
6	MF	USA	Lori Lindsey
7	MF	USA	Parrissa Eyorokon
8	MF	FRA	Sonia Bompastor
9	MF	USA	Allie Long
10	MF	JPN	Homare Sawa
11	DF	USA	Emily Janss
14	MF	USA	Sarah Huffman

No.	Pos.	Nation	Player
15	MF	USA	Kristin DeDycker
17	FW	AUS	Lisa De Vanna
18	GK	CAN	Erin McLeod
19	MF	USA	Rebecca Moros
20	FW	USA	Abby Wambach
21	DF	USA	Alex Singer
22	DF	USA	Becky Sauerbrunn
24	DF	USA	Christen Karniski
25	FW	USA	Claire Zimmeck
26	MF	USA	Madison Keller
61	GK	USA	Kati Jo Spisak

=== Team management ===
2009 coaching staff

Position	Name	Nationality
Head coach	Jim Gabarra	American
Assistant coach	Clyde Watson	Guyanese
Goalkeeper coach	Nicci Wright	Canadian

== Competition ==
=== Regular season ===
March 29 1	Los Angeles Sol	2–0	Washington Freedom	Carson, California
15:30 EDT (UTC-04)	Falk 6'; Abily 87'	Box Score		Stadium: StubHub Center

April 11 2	Washington Freedom	1–1	Chicago Red Stars	Germantown, Maryland
15:30 EDT (UTC-04)	Sauerbrunn 54'	Box Score	Tarpley 29'; Östberg (yellow card) 54' (yellow-red card) 63'	Stadium: Maryland SoccerPlex

April 18 3	Washington Freedom	1–3	Boston Breakers	Germantown, Maryland
15:30 EDT (UTC-04)	Lindsey 60'	Box Score	Smith 56' (yellow card) 70'; Latham 76'; Hucles 81'	Stadium: Maryland SoccerPlex

April 26 4	FC Gold Pride	3–4	Washington Freedom	Hayward, California
15:30 EDT (UTC-04)	Milbrett 30'; Weimer 75'; Sinclair 83'	Box Score	Wambach 18', 90'; Lindsey 51'; Long 70'	Stadium: Pioneer Stadium

May 3 5	Washington Freedom	3–3	Saint Louis Athletica	Germantown, Maryland
15:30 EDT (UTC-04)	Bompastor 30', 90'; De Vanna 79'; Wambach (yellow card) 81'	Box Score	Daniela 7', 41'; McNeill (yellow card) 39'; Aluko 69'; Weber (yellow card) 90'	Stadium: Maryland SoccerPlex

May 17 6	Boston Breakers	1–1	Washington Freedom	Boston, Massachusetts
15:30 EDT (UTC-04)	Weber (yellow card) 15'; Scott 49'; Latham (yellow card) 52'	Box Score	Gilbeau (yellow card) 18'; Moros 33'; Singer (yellow card) 74'	Stadium: Harvard Stadium

May 23 7	Washington Freedom	2–1	Sky Blue FC	Washington, DC
15:30 EDT (UTC-04)	Whitehill 35'; De Vanna 39'; DeDycker (yellow card) 77'	Box Score	Dowling (yellow card) 48'; Rosana 65'; Asante (yellow card) 84'; Keselica (yellow card) 89'	Stadium: RFK Stadium

May 31 8	Washington Freedom	3–1	FC Gold Pride	Germantown, Maryland
15:30 EDT (UTC-04)	Graczyk 16' (o.g.); De Vanna 22'; Whitehill 32'	Box Score	Forminga (yellow card) 45'; Sinclair 57'; Dew (yellow card) 83' (yellow-red card) 83'	Stadium: Maryland SoccerPlex

June 7 9	Los Angeles Sol	3–1	Washington Freedom	Carson, California
15:30 EDT (UTC-04)	Abily 14', 60' (pen.); Bock 66'; Boxx (yellow card) 71'	Box Score	Lohman (yellow card) 8'; Bompastor 58'	Stadium: Home Depot Center

June 13 10	Washington Freedom	0–0	Chicago Red Stars	Washington, DC
15:30 EDT (UTC-04)	Wambach (yellow card) 82'; Bompastor (yellow card) 84'	Box Score	Klein (yellow card) 37'; Rapinoe (yellow card) 45'; Carney (red card) 60'	Stadium: RFK Stadium

June 20 11	Saint Louis Athletica	0–1	Washington Freedom	Fenton, Missouri
15:30 EDT (UTC-04)	Addis (yellow card) 23'; Cinalli (yellow card) 35'	Box Score	Moros 83'	Stadium: Anheuser-Busch Soccer Park

June 24 12	Boston Breakers	1–0	Washington Freedom	Boston, Massachusetts
15:30 EDT (UTC-04)	Latham 38'; Tomecka (yellow card) 71'	Box Score	Moros (yellow card) 68'	Stadium: Harvard Stadium

July 1 13	Chicago Red Stars	2–1	Washington Freedom	Bridgeview, Illinois
15:30 EDT (UTC-04)	Spilger (yellow card) 36'; Cristiane 48'; Tarpley 61'	Box Score	Wambach 34'	Stadium: Toyota Park

July 5 14	Washington Freedom	0–1	Los Angeles Sol	Germantown, Maryland
15:30 EDT (UTC-04)		Box Score	Larkin (yellow card) 37'; Boxx (yellow card) 88'; Marta 90'	Stadium: Maryland SoccerPlex

July 15 15	Sky Blue FC	4–4	Washington Freedom	Piscataway Township, New Jersey
15:30 EDT (UTC-04)	Kai 6', 86'; Dowling (yellow card) 45'; White 27', 46'	Box Score	Bompastor 4'; De Vanna 47', 54'; Cat Whitehill 90'	Stadium: Yurcak Field

July 18 16	Washington Freedom	1–0	Saint Louis Athletica	Washington, DC
15:30 EDT (UTC-04)	Sawa 74'	Box Score	Larsson (yellow card) 68'	Stadium: [[RFK Stadium]]

July 26 17	Chicago Red Stars	2–3	Washington Freedom	Bridgeview, Illinois
16:00 EDT (UTC-04)	Rapinoe 15' (yellow card) 32'; Carney 69'	Box Score	Wambach 35', 56'; Long 89'; Bompastor (yellow card) 90'	Stadium: Toyota Park

July 29 18	Washington Freedom	1–0	Boston Breakers	Germantown, Maryland
20:00 EDT (UTC-04)	Wambach 73'; Whitehill (yellow card) 64'	Box Score	Scott (red card) 6'; Mitts (yellow card) 37'	Stadium: Maryland SoccerPlex

August 1 19	FC Gold Pride	3–2	Washington Freedom	Hayward, California
15:30 EDT (UTC-04)	Yokers 9'; Milbrett 83'; Dew (yellow card) 61'; Adriane 83'	Box Score	Sawa 17', 38'	Stadium: Pioneer Stadium

August 8 20	Washington Freedom	3–1	Sky Blue FC	Germantown, Maryland
19:00 EDT (UTC-04)	Wambach 19', 48'; De Vanna 57'	Box Score	Rosana 53'	Stadium: Maryland SoccerPlex

==== Regular-season standings ====
Pos	Team	Pld	W	D	L	GF	GA	GD	Pts	Qualification
1	Los Angeles Sol	20	12	5	3	27	10	+17	41	Advance to Championship
2	Saint Louis Athletica	20	10	4	6	19	15	+4	34	Advance to Super Semifinal
3	Washington Freedom	20	8	5	7	32	32	0	29	Advance to First Round
4	Sky Blue FC	20	7	5	8	19	20	−1	26	Advance to First Round
5	Boston Breakers	20	7	4	9	18	20	−2	25	

Source: Soccerway
Rules for classification: Tiebreakers

=== WPS playoffs ===
The Freedom finished 3rd in the table earning a place in the WPS Playoffs in a First Round match up versus 4th place Sky Blue FC. Despite having defeated Sky Blue on the final day of the regular season, the Freedom dropped the First Round match at home after conceding a late goal to Francielle.

August 15, 2009 First Round	Washington Freedom	1–2	Sky Blue FC	Germantown, Maryland
4:00 pm EDT	De Vanna 79'	Report	Kai 56'; Francielle 85'	Stadium: Maryland SoccerPlex; Attendance: 4,217; Referee: Daniel Fitzgerald

== Statistics ==
As of January 6, 2019

No.	Pos	Nat	Player	Total		WPS		Playoffs	
No.	Pos	Nat	Player	Apps	Goals	Apps	Goals	Apps	Goals
Defenders:
2	DF	(United States) USA	Sarah Senty	8	0	5+2	0	1	0
4	DF	(United States) USA	Cat Whitehill	20	3	19	3	1	0
11	DF	(United States) USA	Emily Janss	5	0	3+2	0	0	0
21	DF	(United States) USA	Alex Singer	17	0	13+3	0	0+1	0
22	DF	(United States) USA	Becky Sauerbrunn	21	1	20	1	1	0
24	DF	(United States) USA	Christen Karniski	0	0	0	0	0	0
27	DF	(United States) USA	Ali Krieger	11	0	9+1	0	1	0
Midfielders:
3	MF	(United States) USA	Jill Gilbeau	20	0	12+7	0	1	0
5	MF	(United States) USA	Joanna Lohman	7	0	2+5	0	0	0
6	MF	(United States) USA	Lori Lindsey	20	2	18+1	2	1	0
7	MF	(United States) USA	Parrissa Eyorokon	4	0	0+4	0	0	0
8	MF	(France) FRA	Sonia Bompastor	19	4	19	4	0	0
9	MF	(United States) USA	Allie Long	19	2	11+7	2	0+1	0
10	MF	(Japan) JPN	Homare Sawa	21	3	20	3	1	0
14	MF	(United States) USA	Sarah Huffman	1	0	0	0	0+1	0
15	MF	(United States) USA	Kristin DeDycker	7	0	3+4	0	0	0
19	MF	(United States) USA	Rebecca Moros	20	2	13+6	2	1	0
26	MF	(United States) USA	Madison Keller	0	0	0	0	0	0
Forwards:
17	FW	(Australia) AUS	Lisa De Vanna	21	7	16+4	6	1	1
20	FW	(United States) USA	Abby Wambach	18	8	16+1	8	1	0
25	FW	(United States) USA	Clair Zimmeck	0	0	0	0	0	0

=== Goalkeepers ===
No.	Nat	Player	Women's Professional Soccer								
No.	Nat	Player	GP	GS	MIN	W	L	D	GA	GAA	CS
1	(United States)	Briana Scurry	3	3	270	0	2	1	6	1.97	0
18	(Canada)	Erin McLeod	14	14	1260	6	5	3	20	1.41	3
23	(United States)	Nicci Wright	1	0	26	1	0	0	0	0.00	1
61	(United States)	Kati Jo Spisak	3	3	244	1	0	1	6	2.18	1

== Honors and awards ==
=== Player of the Week ===
Week	Player of the Week	Week's Statline
Week 5	(United States) Abby Wambach	2 G (18', 90') GWG, 1 A (51')
Week 6	(France) Sonia Bompastor	2 G (29', 90')
Week 13	(Canada) Erin McLeod	7 SVS, SHO
Week 18	(United States) Abby Wambach	2 G (35', 56')
Week 20	(United States) Abby Wambach	1 A (58'), 2 G (20', 49')

=== Player of the Month ===
Month	Player of the Month	Month's Statline
May	(France) Sonia Bompastor	2 G, 3 A in 4 games; Freedom 2–0–2 in May
July	(United States) Abby Wambach	4 G, 1 A in 5 games; Freedom 3–2–1 in July

== Transfers ==
As part of the inaugural season, each of the league’s seven teams went through several mechanisms for player acquisitions to fill out their rosters. These included:

- WPS Player Allocation – allocation of existing US national team players across the league
- International Draft – draft of international players across the league
- General Draft – draft of existing professional players not active with their respective national teams
- Draft – inaugural college draft

=== In ===
Date	Player	Number	Position	Previous club	Fee/notes
September 16, 2008	(United States) Cat Whitehill	4	DF	(United States) New Jersey Wildcats	WPS Player Allocation
September 16, 2008	(United States) Abby Wambach	20	FW	(United States) Washington Freedom (W-League)	WPS Player Allocation
September 16, 2008	(United States) Ali Krieger		DF	(Germany) 1. FFC Frankfurt	WPS Player Allocation; loan from June
September 24, 2008	(France) Sonia Bompastor	8	MF	(France) Lyon	WPS International Draft
September 24, 2008	(Japan) Homare Sawa	10	MF	(Japan) Nippon TV Beleza	WPS International Draft
September 24, 2008	(Australia) Lisa De Vanna	17	FW	(Sweden) AIK	WPS International Draft
September 24, 2008	(France) Louisa Necib		MF	(France) Lyon	WPS International Draft
October 6, 2008	(United States) Lori Lindsey	6	MF	(United States) Washington Freedom (W-League)	WPS General Draft
October 6, 2008	(United States) Emily Janss	11	DF	(Sweden) Fortuna Hjørring	WPS General Draft
October 6, 2008	(United States) Sarah Huffman	14	MF	(Norway) Røa IL	WPS General Draft
October 6, 2008	(United States) Becky Sauerbrunn	22	DF	(United States) Washington Freedom (W-League)	WPS General Draft
January 16, 2009	(United States) Briana Scurry	1	GK	(United States) Atlanta Beat	WPS Draft
January 16, 2009	(United States) Jill Gilbeau	3	MF	(United States) Washington Freedom (W-League)	WPS Draft
January 16, 2009	(United States) Parrissa Eyorokon	7	MF	(United States) Purdue University	WPS Draft
January 16, 2009	(United States) Allie Long	9	MF	(United States) University of North Carolina	WPS Draft
January 16, 2009	(United States) Rebecca Moros	19	MF	(United States) Washington Freedom (W-League)	WPS Draft
January 16, 2009	(United States) Alex Singer	21	DF	(United States) Washington Freedom (W-League)	WPS Draft
January 16, 2009	(United States) Christen Karniski	24	DF	(Sweden) Bälinge IF	WPS Draft
January 16, 2009	(United States) Clair Zimmeck	25	FW	(United States) Richmond Strikers	WPS Draft
January 16, 2009	(United States) Kati Jo Spisak	61	GK	(United States) Washington Freedom (W-League)	WPS Draft
January 16, 2009	(United States) Sarah Senty		DF	(United States) Washington Freedom (W-League)	WPS Draft
March 26, 2009	(United States) Madison Keller	26	MF	(United States) Washington Freedom (W-League)	Free Agent
April 16, 2009	(Canada) Erin McLeod	18	GK	(Canada) Vancouver Whitecaps	Post International Draft
	(United States) Kristin DeDycker	15	MF	(United States) Atlanta Beat	Free Agent
