= 2009 WPS Draft =

The 2009 WPS Draft took place on January 16, 2009. It was the first draft held by Women's Professional Soccer to assign the WPS rights of college players to the American-based teams, though other players not previously assigned could be drafted as well.

== Round 1 ==
Pick	Player	Pos.	WPS Team	Previous team
1	Amy Rodriguez	FW	Boston Breakers	USC
2	Megan Rapinoe	MF	Chicago Red Stars	Portland
3	Christina DiMartino	MF	FC Gold Pride	UCLA
4	Yael Averbuch	MF	Sky Blue FC	UNC
5	Brittany Bock	MF	Los Angeles Sol	Notre Dame
6	Kerri Hanks	FW	Saint Louis Athletica	Notre Dame
7	Allie Long	MF	Washington Freedom	UNC

== Round 2 ==
Pick	Player	Pos.	WPS Team	Previous team
8	Alex Singer	DF	Washington Freedom	Virginia; Washington Freedom (W-League)
9	Kia McNeill	DF	Saint Louis Athletica	Boston College
10	Allison Falk	DF	Los Angeles Sol	Stanford
11	Meghan Schnur	MF	Sky Blue FC	Connecticut
12	Carrie Dew	DF	FC Gold Pride	Notre Dame; Pali Blues
13	Nikki Krzysik	DF	Chicago Red Stars	Virginia; Richmond Kickers Destiny
14	Brittany Klein	MF	Chicago Red Stars	Santa Clara; Pali Blues

== Round 3 ==
Pick	Player	Pos.	WPS Team	Previous team
15	Kasey Moore	DF	Boston Breakers	Texas; Ventura County Fusion
16	Natalie Spilger	DF	Chicago Red Stars	Bälinge IF
17	Tiffany Weimer	FW	FC Gold Pride	Santos FC
18	Karen Bardsley	GK	Sky Blue FC	Pali Blues
19	Katie Larkin	MF	Los Angeles Sol	Brigham Young
20	Stephanie Logterman	DF	Saint Louis Athletica	Texas
21	Elise Weber	DF	Saint Louis Athletica	Notre Dame

== Round 4 ==
Pick	Player	Pos.	WPS Team	Previous team
22	Jill Gilbeau	DF	Washington Freedom	Texas; Washington Freedom (W-League)
23	Parrissa Eyorokon	MF	Washington Freedom	Purdue
24	Greer Barnes	DF	Los Angeles Sol	West Virginia; West Virginia Illusion
25	Christie Shaner	DF	Sky Blue FC	Notre Dame; F.C. Indiana
26	Marisa Abegg	DF	FC Gold Pride	Stanford
27	Jenni Branam	GK	Chicago Red Stars	Bälinge IF
28	Chioma Igwe	MF	Chicago Red Stars	Santa Clara

== Round 5 ==
Pick	Player	Pos.	WPS Team	Previous team
29	Jennifer Nobis	FW	Boston Breakers	Umeå Södra FF
30	Stacey Tullock	MF	Chicago Red Stars	Philadelphia Charge
31	Ameera Abdullah	MF	FC Gold Pride	Florida
32	Julianne Sitch	DF	Sky Blue FC	F.C. Indiana
33	Valerie Henderson	GK	Los Angeles Sol	Pali Blues
34	Niki Cross	DF	Saint Louis Athletica	Umeå Södra FF
35	Briana Scurry	GK	Washington Freedom	Atlanta Beat

== Round 6 ==
Pick	Player	Pos.	WPS Team	Previous team
36	Rebecca Moros	MF	Washington Freedom	Washington Freedom (W-League)
37	Jillian Loyden	GK	Saint Louis Athletica	Jersey Sky Blue
38	Katie Hooker	MF	Los Angeles Sol	Real Colorado Cougars
39	Jen Buczkowski	MF	Sky Blue FC	Chicago Gaels
40	Leigh Ann Robinson	DF	FC Gold Pride	San Diego
41	Kelly Schmedes	FW	Boston Breakers	Charlotte Eagles
42	Ariel Harris	DF	Boston Breakers	North Carolina

== Round 7 ==
Pick	Player	Pos.	WPS Team	Previous team
43	Lindsay Vera	FW	Boston Breakers	North Carolina State; Carolina RailHawks
44	Lauren Sesselmann	FW	Chicago Red Stars	F.C. Indiana
45	Brandi Chastain	MF	FC Gold Pride	California Storm
46	Zhang Ouying	FW	Sky Blue FC	San Diego WFC SeaLions
47	McCall Zerboni	MF	Los Angeles Sol	UCLA
48	Lisa Stoia	MF	Saint Louis Athletica	Boston Renegades
49	Sarah Senty	DF	Washington Freedom	Virginia; Washington Freedom (W-League)

== Round 8 ==
Pick	Player	Pos.	WPS Team	Previous team
50	Kati Jo Spisak	GK	Washington Freedom	Washington Freedom (W-League)
51	Megan Kerns	FW	Saint Louis Athletica	Florida
52	Brittany Cameron	GK	Los Angeles Sol	San Diego
53	Mary Therese McDonnell	DF	Sky Blue FC	Boston Renegades
54	Allison Whitworth	GK	FC Gold Pride	Auburn Tigers; Atlanta Silverbacks
55	Kat Tarr	DF	Chicago Red Stars	Missouri; FC St. Louis
56	Ashley Nick	MF	Boston Breakers	Southern California

== Round 9 ==
Pick	Player	Pos.	WPS Team	Previous team
57	Allison Martino	MF	Boston Breakers	Boston Renegades
58	Jessica O'Rourke	MF	Chicago Red Stars	F.C. Indiana
59	Alissa Oldenkamp	FW	FC Gold Pride	Arizona State
60	Mele French	FW	Sky Blue FC	Pali Blues
61	Erica Janke	DF	Los Angeles Sol	FC Gütersloh
62	Sheree Gray	DF	Saint Louis Athletica	Penn State
63	Claire Zimmeck	FW	Washington Freedom	William & Mary; Richmond Kickers

== Round 10 ==
Pick	Player	Pos.	WPS Team	Previous team
64	Christen Karniski	DF	Washington Freedom	Washington Freedom (W-League)
65	Lydia Vandenbergh	MF	Saint Louis Athletica	Charlotte Eagles
66	Lisa Sari	MF	Los Angeles Sol	Seattle Sounders
67	Fanta Cooper	DF	Sky Blue FC	Umeå Södra FF
68	Stacie Alberico	FW	FC Gold Pride	California Storm
69	Stacy Bishop	MF	Boston Breakers	Tampa Bay Hellenic
70	Jaimel Johnson	GK	Boston Breakers	Tennessee

== See also ==
- List of foreign WPS players
