= Christie Shaner =

American soccer player

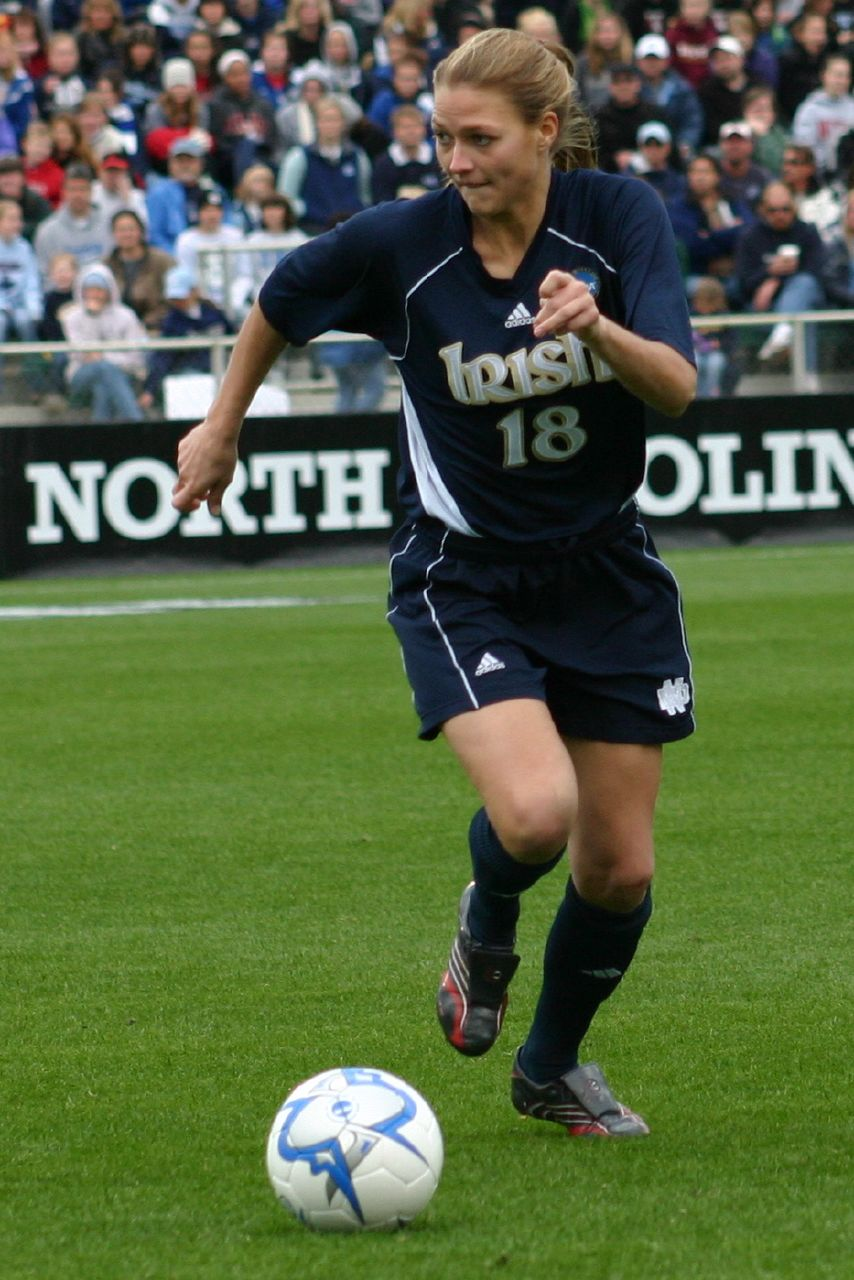

Personal information
- Full name: Christie Robinson Shaner
- Date of birth: September 7, 1984 (age 42)
- Place of birth: North Wales, Pennsylvania, U.S.
- Height: 5 ft 8 in (1.73 m)
- Position: Defender

Team information
- Current team: Pali Blues and Ajax America Women

College career
Years	Team	Apps	(Gls)
2003–2006	Notre Dame Fighting Irish	100	(3)

Senior career*
Years	Team	Apps	(Gls)
2004	Fort Wayne Fever	13	(3)
2003–2008	F.C. Indiana	72	(4)
2009	Sky Blue FC	2	(0)
2009	Los Angeles Sol	1	(0)
2010	Pali Blues	10	(0)
2010	Ajax America Women	4	(0)
2011–	Pali Blues	14	(2)
- * Club domestic league appearances and goals

Christie Robinson Shaner (born September 7, 1984) is an American soccer defender from the Commonwealth of Pennsylvania who last played for Pali Blues of USL W-League.

Named four times to the all-Big East for her defensive performance at the University of Notre Dame, she was described by her coach Randy Waldrum as "one of the best tacklers in the country" in 2006.

== Biography ==
Born on September 7, 1984, in North Wales, Pennsylvania, Shaner attended the Germantown Academy in Fort Washington, Pennsylvania, where she achieved visibility as a world-class soccer player. It was during this time that she was part of the Olympic Development Program's pool of athletes, aged nineteen and younger.

She subsequently attended the University of Notre Dame, where she became a soccer standout once again. Named four times to the all-Big East, she played a key role in helping the Irish win a national championship in 2004.

She was also part of a winning senior defensive line that powered the Irish to a successful season in that ended with her team competing for the national championship yet again 2006. Her coach, Randy Waldrum, described as her "one of the best tacklers in the country."

Shaner was drafted by Sky Blue FC during the 2009 WPS Draft. She appeared in two games for Sky Blue before being traded to Los Angeles Sol.

On her Sol debut, she sustained a season ending leg fracture during an encounter with Abby Wambach, making her the second in the league to fall victim under these circumstances (Daniela was the first).

Shaner spent the 2010 season playing for two Los Angeles clubs, Pali Blues of the USL's W-League and Ajax America Women of the Women's Premier Soccer League. She received All-W-League honors and helped Ajax reach the WPSL's final four.

Shaner has also appeared in television spots including a commercial for Chevrolet and on the Kendra Wilkenson show on E Entertainment Television.

Shaner is currently an assistant soccer coach, is pursuing a career in modeling and acting, and is also Hans Wetzel's personal trainer.
