= Tiffany Roberts =

American soccer coach and player (born 1977)

Personal information
- Full name: Tiffany Roberts Sahaydak
- Birth name: Tiffany Marie Roberts
- Date of birth: May 5, 1977 (age 49)
- Place of birth: Petaluma, California, U.S.
- Height: 5 ft 4 in (1.63 m)
- Positions: Defender; midfielder

Team information
- Current team: UCF Knights (head coach)

Youth career
- –1995: Carondelet Cougars

College career
Years	Team	Apps	(Gls)
1995–1998	North Carolina Tar Heels	102	(24)

Senior career*
Years	Team	Apps	(Gls)
2001–2003	Carolina Courage	58	(1)
2005	Washington Freedom		

International career
1997–1998	United States U21		
1994–2004	United States	112	(7)

Managerial career
- 2007–2012: VCU Rams
- 2013–: UCF Knights
- 2022–: United States (assistant)
Medal record
Representing United States
Olympic Games
Gold medal – first place	1996 Atlanta	Team
FIFA Women's World Cup
First place	1999 United States
Third place	1995 Sweden
Third place	2003 United States
- * Club domestic league appearances and goals

Tiffany Roberts Sahaydak (born Tiffany Marie Roberts; May 5, 1977) is an American soccer coach, former defender, and Olympic gold medalist. She was also a member of the 1999 U.S. national team that won the 1999 FIFA Women's World Cup. She became the 16th player in U.S. history to play over 100 matches for her country and was a founding member of the WUSA, the first women's professional soccer league in the United States. She is currently head coach of the women's soccer team at the University of Central Florida.

== Early life ==
Born in Petaluma, California, Roberts attended the all-girls' Carondelet High School in Concord, California where she scored 90 goals and provided 51 assists in three and a half seasons. During her senior year, she scored nine goals with five assists in six games before leaving to join the national team. She graduated from high school via correspondent courses in order to train full-time with the national team beginning in January 1995 in preparation for the 1995 Women's World Cup. Roberts was named the 1994 California High School Player of the Year. She was a three-time Parade High School All-American, a three-time NSCAA All-American and was the two-time National Girl's High School Player of the Year. As a junior, she scored 34 goals and served 20 assists and helped lead Carondelet to the state title and the number one ranking in the country. A top track athlete in high school, Roberts was ranked in the top 20 in the country for the 400 meter dash and was voted Carondelet's Most Valuable Track & Field Athlete in 1992 and 1993.

Roberts played club soccer for two years with the San Ramon Soccer Club in San Ramon, California. She also played with Alcosta Lightning from age 12-15 and was a member of the Lightning's Under-15 team that won the regional championship. She was voted the MVP of the Far Western Regional in 1993.

Roberts' father is Caucasian, and her mom is a Filipino.

== Playing career ==
=== University of North Carolina ===
Roberts attended the University of North Carolina and played for the Tar Heels under then former national team coach, Anson Dorrance. As a freshman in 1995, she scored five goals and served six assists while starting 22 games and earning First-Team All-ACC honors. As a sophomore, she helped the Tar Heels to the 1996 NCAA title while battling through injuries scoring nine goals and providing 15 assists. During her junior year in 1997, she started all 28 games, scored seven goals and provided 11 assists while helping the team to the NCAA title. She was named First-Team All-ACC and to the NCAA All-Tournament Team. During her senior year, she started all 26 games while scoring three goals with 12 assists and was named MVP of the Atlantic Coast Conference Tournament. She helped the Tar Heels to an undefeated regular season and a berth in the NCAA Championship game and was named to the NCAA All-Tournament Team. The same year, she finished third in voting for both the 1998 Hermann Trophy and MAC Player of the Year Award.

=== Club ===
==== Carolina Courage ====
Roberts was a founding player of the Women's United Soccer Association, the first women's professional soccer league in the United States, and played for the Carolina Courage from 2001 to 2003. During the club's inaugural season in 2001, she started all 21 games. She went on to captain the team over the next two seasons, winning the WUSA Championship in 2002, as well as earning two WUSA All-Star Team selections in 2002 and 2003.

==== Washington Freedom ====
In 2005, Roberts joined the Washington Freedom Reserves, an exhibition team put together by the Washington Freedom ownership, joining former WUSA players like Kylie Bivens and Emily Janss, as well as U-21 National Team players, Ali Krieger and Joanna Lohman. The team also brought in retired soccer players Sun Wen and Brandi Chastain as guest players for one game each. The Freedom compiled a 7–2–2 record for the season of exhibition matches, almost all against W-League teams.

=== International ===
Roberts made her international debut with the United States women's national soccer team at the age of 16 in 1994 during a match against Portugal and was a member of the U.S. team that won the title at the CONCACAF Qualifying Championship in Montreal in 1994. She scored her first goal on April 10, 1994 in a match against Trinidad & Tobago.

In 1995, she played for the team that finished third at the 1995 FIFA Women's World Cup in Sweden. In 1996, she was a member of the gold medal-winning team at the 1996 Summer Olympics in Atlanta, Georgia. Her defensive play in the midfield was considered key to the victory over Norway during the Olympic semifinals.

In 1998, Roberts was a member of the gold medal-winning team at the 1998 Goodwill Games. During the 1999 FIFA Women's World Cup, she played in two matches helping the team win gold.

Previously, Roberts represented the United States on the U-21 national team that won the 1997 Nordic Cup in Denmark and finished second at the 1998 Nordic Cup in the Netherlands.

== Coaching career ==
Roberts began her coaching career as co-head coach of the women's soccer team at Virginia Commonwealth University along with her husband, former MLS player, Tim Sahaydak. She was then hired as head coach at the University of Central Florida on May 6, 2013, with Tim hired as an assistant.

In January 2022, Roberts began working as an assistant coach for the United States women's national team under head coach Vlatko Andonovski.

=== Head coaching record ===
Record table
Season	Team	Overall	Conference	Standing	Postseason
UCF Knights (American Athletic Conference) (2013–present)
2013	UCF	16–2–4	8–0–1	American Champions	NCAA Tournament First Round
2014	UCF	18–5–0	8–1–0	American Champions	NCAA Tournament Sweet 16
UCF:		34–8–4	16–1–1		
Total:		87–57–23			
National champion Postseason invitational champion Conference regular season champion Conference regular season and conference tournament champion Division regular season champion Division regular season and conference tournament champion Conference tournament champion

== Sports administration career ==
In 2011, Roberts traveled to Brazil on behalf of the United States Department of State to conduct soccer clinics with former national team member and teammate, Linda Hamilton.

In June 2014, Roberts traveled to Brazil on behalf of the United States Department of State to participate in a Sports Envoy program with former U.S. national team member Cobi Jones. In July 2014, Roberts returned to Brazil as a member of the official White House delegation at the opening game of the FIFA World Cup in São Paulo, Brazil.

== Honors ==
Tiffany Roberts Field in San Ramon Sports Park.

=== Player ===
United States

- Women's World Cup (1999)
- Olympics (1996)

=== Coach ===
UCF Knights

- American Tournament Championship (2013)
- 4x American Regular Season Championship (2013, 2014, 2017, 2022)

Individual

- American Coach of the Year (2013)
- Colonial Coach of the Year (2011)
