= 2008 WPS Player Allocation =

2008 association football draft

The Women's Professional Soccer Player Allocation distributed 21 players from the United States women's national soccer team player pool to seven teams in the Women's Professional Soccer (WPS) for the league's inaugural season.

== Process ==
The allocation followed a process in which the players and teams submitted their preferences to the league. A committee then reviewed the lists to provide its recommendations. The WPS Board of Governors met on September 14–15, 2008 to consult with the players, teams and league to determine the best possible dispersal for all parties with the following allocation results.

== Allocation results ==
	Boston Breakers	Chicago Red Stars	Los Angeles Sol	Sky Blue FC	FC Gold Pride	St. Louis Athletica	Washington Freedom
(United States)	Kristine Lilly	Carli Lloyd	Shannon Boxx	Heather O'Reilly	Leslie Osborne	Hope Solo	Abby Wambach
(United States)	Angela Hucles	Kate Markgraf	Stephanie Cox	Natasha Kai	Rachel Buehler	Lori Chalupny	Cat Whitehill
(United States)	Heather Mitts	Lindsay Tarpley	Aly Wagner	Christie Rampone	Nicole Barnhart	Tina Ellertson	Ali Krieger
