= Kristin DeDycker =

American soccer midfielder

Personal information
- Full name: Kristin Leigh DeDycker
- Birth name: Kristin Leigh Warren
- Date of birth: December 17, 1980 (age 45)
- Place of birth: Houston, Texas, United States
- Height: 5 ft 8 in (1.73 m)
- Position: Midfielder

College career
Years	Team	Apps	(Gls)
1999–2002	Denver Pioneers		

Senior career*
Years	Team	Apps	(Gls)
2003	Atlanta Beat		
2005–2006	Mile High Mustangs/Edge	15	(3)
2007–2008	Denver Diamonds	7	(2)
2009	Washington Freedom	7	(0)
- * Club domestic league appearances and goals

Kristin Leigh DeDycker (née Warren; born December 17, 1980) is an American soccer midfielder who last played for the Washington Freedom of Women's Professional Soccer.
