= Nicci Wright =

Canadian soccer player (born 1972)

Personal information
- Full name: Nicole Cheri Wright
- Date of birth: 12 August 1972 (age 54)
- Place of birth: Quesnel, British Columbia, Canada
- Height: 1.80 m (5 ft 11 in)
- Position: Goalkeeper

College career
Years	Team	Apps	(Gls)
1992–1996	Victoria Vikes		

Senior career*
Years	Team	Apps	(Gls)
2003	Washington Freedom	2	(0)

International career
1996–2002	Canada	37	(0)
- * Club domestic league appearances and goals

Nicole Cheri Wright (born 12 August 1972) is a Canadian soccer player who played as a goalkeeper for the Canada women's national soccer team. She was part of the team at the 1999 FIFA Women's World Cup.

She played for the Washington Freedom in the Women's United Soccer Association in 2003.
