= Becca Moros =

American soccer coach and former player (born 1985)

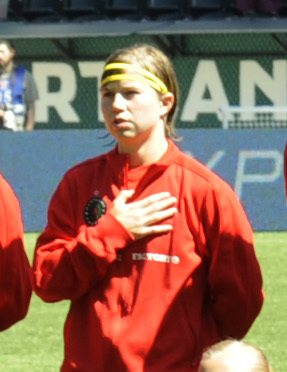
- Moros in 2014

Personal information
- Full name: Rebecca Ann Moros
- Date of birth: May 6, 1985 (age 41)
- Place of birth: Manhattan, New York, United States
- Height: 5 ft 5 in (1.65 m)
- Position: Defender

Team information
- Current team: Arizona Wildcats (head coach)

College career
Years	Team	Apps	(Gls)
2003–2006	Duke Blue Devils	86	(15)

Senior career*
Years	Team	Apps	(Gls)
2005	New Jersey Wildcats	8	(0)
2006	Long Island Fury		
2007–2010	Washington Freedom	68	(11)
2011	magicJack	8	(0)
2011	Western New York Flash	10	(0)
2012–2014	INAC Kobe Leonessa	10	(0)
2014	Portland Thorns FC	19	(0)
2015	FC Kansas City	20	(0)
2016	Houston Dash	17	(0)
2017	FC Kansas City	19	(0)
2018–2019	Utah Royals FC	30	(0)

International career^{‡}
2006	United States U-21		

Managerial career
- 2020–2021: NJ/NY Gotham FC (assistant)
- 2021–present: Arizona
- * Club domestic league appearances and goals as of February 3, 2020 ‡ National team caps and goals as of December 13, 2009

Becca Moros
Current position
- Title: Head coach
- Team: Arizona
- Conference: Big 12
- Record: 19–28–8 (.418)

Coaching career (HC unless noted)
- 2021–Present: Arizona

Head coaching record
- Overall: 19–28–8 (.418)

Rebecca Ann Moros (born May 6, 1985) is an American soccer coach and former player who is currently the head coach for University of Arizona women's soccer team. A defender during her playing career, Moros played for the Utah Royals, FC Kansas City, Houston Dash and Portland Thorns FC in the NWSL, INAC Kobe Leonessa in Japan's Nadeshiko League and for Washington Freedom and Western New York Flash in the Women's Professional Soccer.

== Early life ==
Born in Manhattan, New York to Dr. Daniel Moros and Dr. Ann Schongalla, Moros attended Mamaroneck High School but only played her junior year for the school. Instead, she opted to play year-round soccer with club team, NYC FC, a team that won the Florida state championship two times. Moros led NYC FC to three Region I Championships and received All-League and All-Section honors in Summer of 2002 during her senior year.

Moros played on the New York Olympic Development Program (ODP) state team from 1998 to 2003 where she was a five-time member of the Region I Olympic Development Program (ODP) team. With the team, she was a U-19, U-17, U-16 Region I three-time champion and three-time bronze medalists at the nationals. During the summer of 2003, she played on the U-19 adidas Cup All-America squad.

=== Duke University ===
Moros attended Duke University. As a freshman in 2003, Moros played in 21 matches, earning a starting spot for the final 11. She scored three goals and provided two assists. She netted her first career goal in a 4–0 win over Richmond and assisted the game-winning goal against Virginia in the ACC Tournament.

During her sophomore year, Moros started all 23 games and led the team with 11 assists, tied for second-most in Duke single-season history. She set a Duke single-game record four assists versus Virginia Tech. Moros garnered Soccer Buzz second team and NSCAA third team All-Southeast Region honors and was selected as second team All-ACC. She received All-America honors from the Jewish Sports Review and was a member of Duke/adidas Soccer Classic All-Tournament Team.

As a junior, Moros played in all 21 matches for the Blue Devils, starting 20. She scored four goals and provided four assists. She earned Soccer Buzz All-America honorable mention honors and Soccer Buzz All-Southeast Region first team honors and was selected to the NSCAA All-Southeast Region second team and All-ACC first team. Moros was named Soccer America Team of the Week, Soccer Buzz Team of the Week, and ACC Player of the Week. She was selected to Duke/adidas Classic All-Tournament Team and netted two game-winning goals versus San Diego and top-ranked North Carolina.

During her senior year, Moros started in all 21 matches scoring four goals and assisting on three others for 11 points (ranking fourth on the team in points). She earned NSCAA/adidas Third Team All-America honors and was named to Soccer Buzz Second Team All-Region and All-ACC first team. She also received All-Tournament Team honors at both the UAB Nike Classic and Duke Classic.

== Club career ==
=== Washington Freedom ===
After playing two seasons with the Washington Freedom W-League team, Moros was selected in the sixth round (36th overall) of the 2009 WPS Draft by the Washington Freedom for the inaugural season of the WPS. She made 20 appearances, with 14 starts for a total of 1,221 minutes and scored two goals.

Moros returned to the Freedom for the 2010 WPS season. She started all 24 of her appearances for a total of 2,201 minutes and scored one goal.

=== magicJack ===
The Washington Freedom came under new ownership in 2011, getting moved to Florida and re-branded as magicJack. Moros remained with the team for the start of the 2011 WPS season, making five appearances with three starts. She was then traded to the Western New York Flash.

=== Western New York Flash ===
During the remainder of the 2011 WPS season, Moros made ten appearances for the Western New York Flash with nine starts for a total of 864 minutes. She scored one goal and helped the Flash win the 2011 Women's Professional Soccer Playoffs.

=== Sky Blue FC ===
In 2012, Moros signed with Sky Blue FC; however, the league suspended operations before the season began.

=== INAC Kobe Leonessa ===
After the folding of the WPS, Moros joined INAC Kobe Leonessa in Japan.

=== Portland Thorns FC, 2014 ===
In 2014 Portland Thorns FC acquired Jessica McDonald and the rights to Moros from the Seattle Reign FC in exchange for Danielle Foxhoven. Both players proved mainstays for the team from early on, with Moros playing a total of 1171 minutes over 18 games with 13 starts in the regular season.

=== FC Kansas City, 2015 ===
In January 2015, Portland traded Moros to FC Kansas City for an additional international roster spot. She started all 20 regular-season games for FCKC in the 2015 season.

=== Houston Dash, 2016 ===
In November 2015, FC Kansas City traded Moros to the Western New York Flash for defender Brittany Taylor. In March 2016 Houston Dash acquired Moros from Western New York Flash for a second-round pick in the 2017 NWSL College Draft pick.

=== FC Kansas City, 2017 ===
In March 2017, Moros was traded back to FC Kansas City from the Houston Dash in exchange for their highest third round draft choice in the 2018 NWSL College Draft.

=== Utah Royals FC, 2018–2019 ===
After FC Kansas City ceased operations after the 2017 season, Moros was officially added to the roster of the Utah Royals FC for the 2018 season. Moros was named to the NWSL Team of the Month for June.

Following two seasons with the Utah Royals, Moros was waived by the club on February 3, 2020. She made 30 appearances over her two years with Utah.

== Honors ==
FC Kansas City

- NWSL Championship: 2015

== Head coaching record ==
Record table
Season	Team	Overall	Conference	Standing	Postseason
Arizona Wildcats (Pac-12 Conference) (2021–present)
2021	Arizona	5–13	2–9	12th	
2022	Arizona	8–7–3	5–5–1	6th	
2023	Arizona	6–8–5	3–6–2	8th	
Arizona:		19–28–8 (.418)	10–20–3 (.348)		
Total:		19–28–8 (.418)			
