= Washington Freedom (soccer) =

- Full name: Washington Freedom
- Nickname: Freedom
- Founded: 2001
- Dissolved: 2011 (relocated, became magicJack)
- Stadium: Maryland SoccerPlex; RFK Stadium
- Capacity: 5,126; 56,692
| Home colors | Away colors |

The Washington Freedom was an American professional women's soccer club based in the Washington, D.C. suburb of Germantown, Maryland, that participated in Women's Professional Soccer. The Freedom was founded in 2001 as a member of the defunct Women's United Soccer Association. Beginning in 2004, the Freedom played its home games at the Maryland SoccerPlex in Germantonwn. In 2011, the team relocated to Boca Raton, Florida, and became MagicJack.

== History ==
=== WUSA (2001–03) ===
The team played its home games at Robert F. Kennedy Memorial Stadium in Washington, D.C., where the team offices were also located. The team's "founding players" (players from the national team allocated three to each WUSA team) were Mia Hamm, Siri Mullinix and Michelle French. They were expected by some to be one of the best in the league but finished seventh out of the eight teams their first season.

However, this finish allowed the Freedom to select Abby Wambach as their first pick in the 2002 WUSA draft. Additional personnel changes, better performance from retained players, and a Mia Hamm improved by off-season knee surgery led to a far better finish, as Washington went undefeated in their last eight matches and finished in third place (only two points out of first). In the postseason, they won their semifinal match against the Philadelphia Charge, 1–0, and went to the Founders Cup, the WUSA championship match, which they lost, 3–2, to the Carolina Courage.

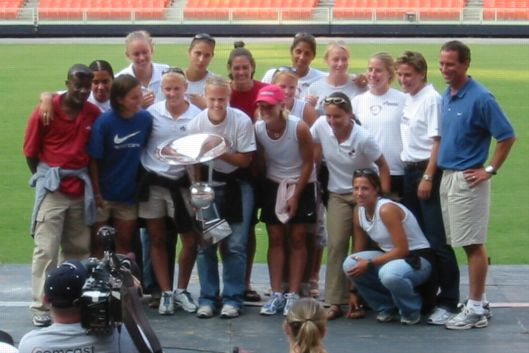
Washington Freedom players and coaches pose with the Founders Cup at RFK Stadium after winning the 2003 WUSA championship

In 2003, the Freedom were just good enough to make the playoffs, clinching the fourth and final spot with two games to go. However, they would go on to beat the regular season champion Boston Breakers in the semifinals, 0–0 (3–1 penalty kick shootout), and then defeated the Atlanta Beat in the Founders Cup, 2–1, in overtime. It was the last Golden Goal in a FIFA-sanctioned first-division league before the practice was changed.

=== Exhibition years (2004–05) ===
After the WUSA folded, the Freedom maintained an existence as the Washington Freedom Soccer Club, moving their home stadium to the Maryland Soccerplex and putting together a team called Washington Freedom Reserves, which consisted of half-a-dozen players from the WUSA days along with young local players. In 2004, they played assorted exhibition matches against college and W-League teams and participated in the WUSA Festivals.

In 2005, the roster was significantly upgraded by adding former WUSA players like Tiffany Roberts, Kylie Bivens, and Emily Janss, as well as players Ali Krieger and Joanna Lohman from the U-21 National Team. The team also brought in former star soccer players Sun Wen and Brandi Chastain as guest players for one game each. In a season of exhibition matches, almost all against W-League teams, the Freedom compiled a 7–2–2 record.

=== W-League (2006–08) ===
The team became an associate member of the W-League in 2006 and played an exhibition season based on home-and-home series against east coast W-League teams. Then, on December 7, 2006, Washington announced that they had acquired a full W-League franchise.

In 2007, playing games that mattered for the first time since 2003, the Freedom compiled a 12–1–1 record, defeated the regular season champion Ottawa Fury in the Eastern Conference championship game, then went on to beat the Atlanta Silverbacks, 3–1, in the W-League championship match.

In 2008, the Freedom went 11–1–2 in the regular season, winning the Northeast Division, then defeated the Atlanta Silverbacks, 2–1, to capture the Eastern Conference championship, but then fell to the eventual W-League champion Pali Blues, 2–0, in the W-League semifinals.

=== Women's Professional Soccer: The first season (2009) ===
When the Women's Professional Soccer league formed in 2008, the Freedom became one of the original seven teams that started play in 2009.

The initial WPS player allocation, announced on September 16, 2008, assigned US Women's National Team players Abby Wambach, Cat Whitehill and Ali Krieger to the Freedom. Wambach had played for the Freedom in 2002 and 2003, while Krieger played for the Washington Freedom Reserves in 2004 and 2005, and for the W-League team in 2007.

In the 2008 WPS International Draft, conducted on September 24, 2008, the Freedom selected Japanese striker Homare Sawa, French players Sonia Bompastor and Louisa Necib and Australian forward Lisa De Vanna. Following the draft, the Freedom named Erin McLeod and Lene Mykjåland as post-draft discovery players.

Following that was the 2008 WPS General Draft on October 6, 2008, and all of the players selected by the Freedom were from the Freedom's 2008 W-League roster: Sarah Huffman, Becky Sauerbrunn, Lori Lindsey and Emily Janss. Lindsey had been on the Freedom roster since the final WUSA season in 2003, and Janss had been with the team since 2005.

The 2009 WPS Draft took place on January 16, 2009. The Freedom drafted Allie Long, Alex Singer, Jill Gilbeau, Parrissa Eyorokon, Briana Scurry, Rebecca Moros, Sarah Senty, Kati Jo Spisak, Claire Zimmeck, and Christen Karniski. Additionally, the Freedom received the rights to Joanna Lohman in a trade with Saint Louis Athletica. All of the players except for Long, Eyorokon, and Scurry had previous experience playing for the Freedom's W-League team.

Two players were added to the roster after tryouts and training camp: Kristin DeDycker and Madison Keller. Keller had experience with the Freedom going back to 2004, while DeDycker (née Warren) had played for the Atlanta Beat in the WUSA.

McLeod was intended to be the starting goalkeeper, but visa issues kept her unavailable through the first five matches of the regular season, and the Freedom had mixed success with Briana Scurry and Kati Jo Spisak in goal. Following her arrival, though, the Freedom won three out of the next six matches while only losing once.

Abby Wambach, meanwhile, was recovering from a broken leg and didn't feel fully recovered until late in the season, when she returned from national team duty having scored her 100th international goal. She then went on a tear, scoring five goals and two assists in the team's final four games. The Freedom won three of those four matches and thereby clinched third place in the standings and a home playoff match. But despite looking strong going into the playoff match, and coming off a solid 3–1 victory over their opponents, Sky Blue FC, they put on a listless performance and were eliminated from the playoffs, 2–1.

=== Women's Professional Soccer: season two (2010) ===
Unlike most of the other WPS teams, the Freedom made only limited changes in the offseason. The marquee signing was of young forward Lene Mykjåland from the Norway national football team, followed by picking up Nikki Marshall, Beverly Goebel, Kristi Eveland, and Caitlin Miskel in the 2010 college draft. The team then signed Christie Welsh, who had helped lead the 2007 Freedom to the W-League championship before being drafted by the WPS Los Angeles Sol and then traded to the St. Louis Athletica. Brittany Bock was acquired in the dispersal draft to place former Los Angeles Sol players. Marisa Abegg and Meagan McCray were brought in after going unsigned by their former WPS team, FC Gold Pride. After the St. Louis Athletica folded, the Freedom signed their 2010 second-round draft pick Ashlyn Harris, who went on to become the starting goalkeeper after Erin McLeod tore her ACL in a match on July 24. On August 5, the Freedom traded their rights to Nigerian defender Faith Ikidi to the Chicago Red Stars for England national team defender Anita Asante.

Players did not return for several reasons. Lori Lindsey and Sarah Senty were picked up in the expansion draft by the Philadelphia Independence, one of the two new WPS teams for 2010. Lindsey had originally joined the team in 2003 during its last year in the WUSA, while Senty joined the W-League team in 2007. Ali Krieger signed a two-year contract with FFC Frankfurt, keeping her there into 2012. Other players with extended Freedom experience not re-signed included Emily Janss (since 2005), Joanna Lohman (2005), Kati Jo Spisak (2007), and Christen Karniski (2008). Additionally, Alex Singer, who joined the W-League team in 2007, was cut on August 5 to make room for Anita Asante.

The Freedom started their season solidly in April and May, with a 4–2–1 record good enough for second place. However, in July and August they went on a ten-game winless streak ending with five losses in a row that put them out of playoff position and put head coach Gabarra's job in jeopardy. Longtime assistant coach Clyde Watson resigned and former Chicago Red Stars head coach Emma Hayes was hired as a consultant. The team rebounded to finish the regular season 4–1–2, good enough for the fourth and final playoff position. That led to a road match against the Philadelphia Independence, which the Freedom lost on a goal from Amy Rodriguez in the waning seconds of overtime, wasting a superb performance from rookie backup goalkeeper Ashlyn Harris.

Following the season, Gabarra announced his resignation, citing "irreconcilable differences" between himself and team management.

=== Women's Professional Soccer: purchase, relocation, and termination (2011) ===
Financial troubles that had stirred in the background during the middle of the previous season came to the front during the offseason, with the longtime team owners finally deciding to back out after ten years of supporting the club. With multiple teams having trouble making offseason payments, the league was under threat of folding.

Dan Borislow, owner of the phone service MagicJack, bought the Freedom in 2011. He changed the team name to Magicjack and moved the team to Boca Raton, Florida. He quickly came into conflict with the players and owners of other teams and the league terminated the franchise on October 25, 2011, accusing Borislow of misconduct. The WPS subsequently cancelled the 2012 season and the WPS ceased to exist.

== Players ==
=== Most recent squad ===
As of August 8, 2010. This was the final roster to play under the Washington Freedom name.

Note: Flags indicate national team as defined under FIFA eligibility rules; some limited exceptions apply. Players may hold more than one non-FIFA nationality.

| No. | Pos. | Nation | Player |
|---|---|---|---|
| 0 | GK | USA | Meagan McCray* |
| 1 | GK | USA | Briana Scurry |
| 3 | DF | USA | Jill Gilbeau |
| 4 | DF | USA | Cat Whitehill |
| 5 | DF | USA | Brittany Bock |
| 6 | MF | USA | Beverly Goebel* |
| 7 | FW | NOR | Lene Mykjåland |
| 8 | MF | FRA | Sonia Bompastor |
| 9 | MF | USA | Allie Long |
| 10 | MF | JPN | Homare Sawa |
| 11 | FW | AUS | Lisa De Vanna |
| 12 | MF | USA | Caitlin Miskel* |

| No. | Pos. | Nation | Player |
|---|---|---|---|
| 13 | MF | USA | Christie Welsh |
| 14 | MF | USA | Sarah Huffman |
| 15 | DF | ENG | Anita Asante |
| 17 | DF | USA | Nikki Marshall |
| 18 | GK | CAN | Erin McLeod |
| 19 | MF | USA | Rebecca Moros |
| 20 | FW | USA | Abby Wambach |
| 22 | DF | USA | Becky Sauerbrunn |
| 23 | DF | USA | Kristi Eveland |
| 24 | GK | USA | Ashlyn Harris |
| 25 | MF | USA | Brittany Klein |
| 27 | DF | USA | Marisa Abegg* |

- Developmental players

=== Notable former players ===
This list includes players who participated in any games played by the top-level Washington Freedom team, whether competitive (WUSA, W-League, WPS) or friendly (WUSA Festivals in 2004, exhibition matches in 2004 and 2005, Hall of Fame game in 2007, etc.).

- (China) Bai Jie (2001–2002)
- (United States) Kylie Bivens (2005)
- (France) Sonia Bompastor (2009–2010)
- (United States) Brandi Chastain (2005)
- (United States) Amanda Cromwell (2001)
- (United States) Joy Fawcett (2004)
- (United States) Julie Foudy (2004)
- (United States) Michelle French (2001)
- (China) Gao Hong (2003)
- (Australia) Kelly Golebiowski (2003–2008)
- (United States) Jennifer Grubb (2001–2006)
- (United States) Mia Hamm (2001–2003, 2007)
- (United States) Angela Hucles (2004)
- (United States) Emily Janss (2005–2009)
- (Germany) Steffi Jones (2002–2003)
- (United States) Ali Krieger (2004, 2006–2007, 2009)
- (United States) Louise Lieberman (2000)
- (United States) Lori Lindsey (2003–2009)
- (United States) Joanna Lohman (2005–2006, 2009)
- (United States) Shannon MacMillan (2004)
- (Finland) Anne Mäkinen (2001–2002)
- (Norway) Lene Mykjåland (2010)
- (United States) Ella Masar (2008)
- (Germany) Jennifer Meier (2003)
- (Germany) Sandra Minnert (2003)
- (United States) Heather Mitts (2004)
- (Canada) Carmelina Moscato (2006)
- (United States) Siri Mullinix (2001–2003)
- (United States) Carla Overbeck (2007)
- (Brazil) Pretinha (2001)
- (China) Pu Wei (2002)
- (United States) Christie Rampone (2004)
- (United States) Tiffany Roberts (2005–2006)
- (Brazil) Roseli (2001)
- (Guyana) Chanté Sandiford (2007–2008)
- (United States) Briana Scurry (2009–2010)
- (United States) Tiffany Weimer (2006)
- (China) Sun Wen (2005)
- (United States) Cat Whitehill (2009–2010)
- (Canada) Nicci Wright (2003–2006, 2009)

=== Hall of Freedom ===
In 2009, the Washington Freedom introduced the "Hall of Freedom", an honor bestowed upon former players and personnel "in recognition of exceptional achievements, dedication and service to the club." Current members of the Hall of Freedom are:

- Jennifer Grubb, DF, 2001–2006, inducted July 24, 2010
- Mia Hamm, FW, 2001–2003, inducted May 3, 2009
- Steffi Jones, MF, 2002–2003, inducted July 5, 2009
- Siri Mullinix, GK, 2001–2003, inducted May 3, 2009
- David Vanole, goalkeeper coach, 2001–2003, inducted July 5, 2009

== Most recent coaching staff ==
As of April 20, 2009.

| Position | Name | Nationality |
|---|---|---|
| Head coach | Jim Gabarra | American |
| Assistant coach | Clyde Watson | Guyanese |
| Goalkeeper coach | Nicci Wright | Canadian |

== Year-by-year ==
| Year | Division | League | Reg. season | Playoffs |
|---|---|---|---|---|
| 2001 | 1 | WUSA | 7th | did not qualify |
| 2002 | 1 | WUSA | 3rd | Founders Cup Final (2nd Place) |
| 2003 | 1 | WUSA | 4th | Champions |
| 2006 | 1 | USL W-League | exhibition season | |
| 2007 | 1 | USL W-League | 1st, Northeast | Champions |
| 2008 | 1 | USL W-League | 1st, Northeast | National Semifinals (3rd Place) |
| 2009 | 1 | WPS | 3rd | First round (4th Place) |
| 2010 | 1 | WPS | 4th | First round (4th Place) |

=== Annual performance record ===
| Year | League | W | L | T | Pts | GF | GA | Home | Away |
|---|---|---|---|---|---|---|---|---|---|
| 2001 | WUSA | 6 | 12 | 3 | 21 | 26 | 35 | 3–6–1 | 3–6–2 |
| 2002 | WUSA | 11 | 5 | 5 | 38 | 40 | 29 | 6–2–3 | 5–3–2 |
| 2003 | WUSA | 9 | 8 | 4 | 31 | 40 | 31 | 6–2–2 | 3–6–2 |
| 2007 | W-League | 12 | 1 | 1 | 37 | 48 | 10 | 6–1–0 | 6–0–1 |
| 2008 | W-League | 11 | 1 | 2 | 35 | 32 | 7 | 5–1–1 | 6–0–1 |
| 2009 | WPS | 8 | 7 | 5 | 29 | 32 | 32 | 5–2–3 | 3–5–2 |
| 2010 | WPS | 8 | 9 | 7 | 31 | 33 | 33 | 7–2–3 | 1–7–4 |

== Honors ==
- USL W-League Eastern Conference Champions 2008
- USL W-League Northeast Division Champions 2008
- USL W-League Champions 2007
- USL W-League Eastern Conference Champions 2007
- USL W-League Northeast Division Champions 2007
- WUSA Founders Cup Champions 2003

== Competition history ==
The Washington Freedom was one of the eight professional soccer teams that played in the Women's United Soccer Association from 2001 to 2003. The team won the WUSA Founders Cup III in their final year, shortly before the league announced on September 15, 2003, that it was suspending operations. Unique among the WUSA teams, though, the Freedom maintained a continued existence, playing exhibition seasons in 2004 and 2005, then joining the USL W-League in 2006 and winning the W-League Championship in 2007. The Freedom became a part of Women's Professional Soccer that launched in April 2009 and participated in that league in 2009 and 2010. The team was then sold, moved to Florida, and renamed MagicJack.

Despite the addition of a professional team, the Freedom maintained an elite amateur team, which played in the W-League in 2009 and 2010, finishing second in the league in 2009.

== Logo ==
Primary logo (2001–2008)

Primary logo (2008–2011)

Secondary Logo (2008–2011)

== Head coaches ==
- (United States) Jim Gabarra 2001–2010

== Stadium ==
- Robert F. Kennedy Memorial Stadium, Washington, D.C. 2001–2004, 2008–2010
- Maryland SoccerPlex, Germantown, Maryland 2004–2010

While in the WUSA, the Washington Freedom played their home games in RFK Stadium in Washington DC. Since the WUSA ended, the Washington Freedom has played most of their home matches at the Soccerplex in Maryland. They have, however, continued to play some games at RFK as doubleheaders with DC United. These include games as the Freedom Reserves in 2004, while in the W-League, and since joining the WPS. They played three doubleheaders in 2009 and one doubleheader in 2010.

== See also ==
- Women's professional sports
- List of soccer clubs in the United States
- Women's association football
