= Cat Whitehill =

American soccer player (born 1982)

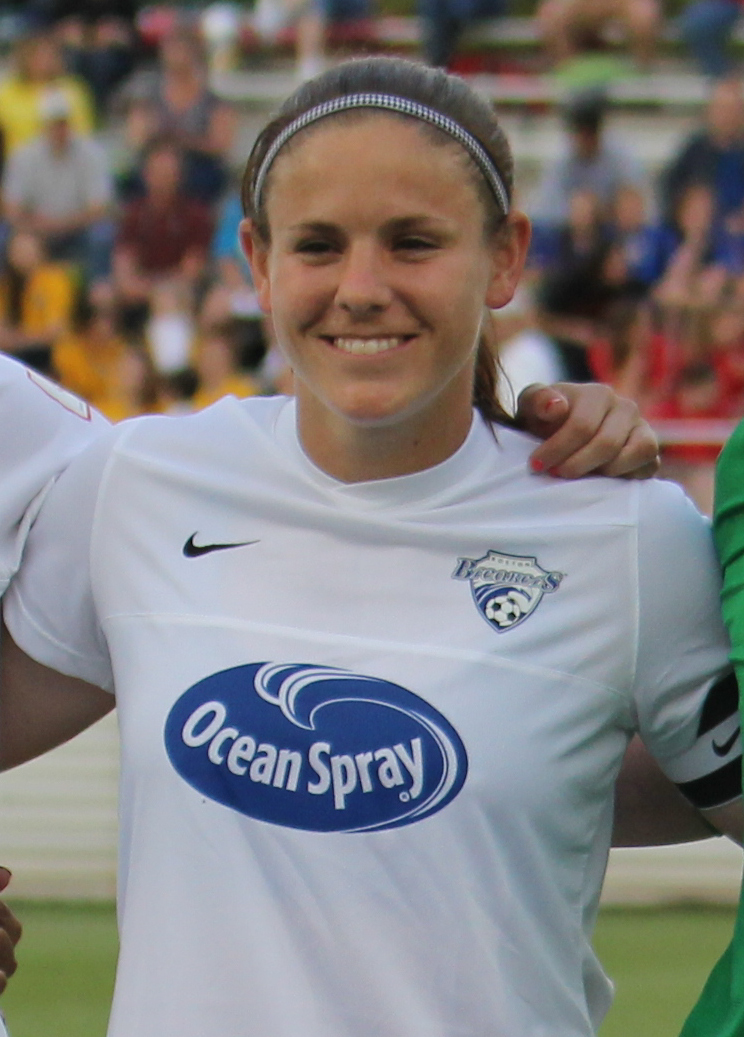
- Whitehill before a match in 2013.

Personal information
- Full name: Catherine Reddick Whitehill
- Birth name: Catherine Anne Reddick
- Date of birth: February 10, 1982 (age 44)
- Place of birth: Richmond, Virginia, United States
- Height: 5 ft 7 in (1.70 m)
- Position: Defender

Youth career
- 1996–2000: Briarwood Christian School
- Briarwood Soccer Club
- Vestavia Hills Soccer Club

College career
| Years | Team | Apps | (Gls) |
| 2000–2003 | North Carolina Tar Heels | | |

Senior career*
| Years | Team | Apps | (Gls) |
| 2005 | New Jersey Wildcats | 9 | (3) |
| 2009–2010 | Washington Freedom | 42 | (4) |
| 2011 | Atlanta Beat | 17 | (0) |
| 2012 | Boston Breakers (WPSL) | 14 | (0) |
| 2013–2015 | Boston Breakers (NWSL) | 46 | (1) |

International career
| 2000–2010 | United States | 134 | (11) |

Managerial career
- 2013: Boston Breakers (player-coach, a.i.)
- 2016: Boston Breakers (assistant)
- 2017: Needham Soccer Club
- 2017: Wellesley Raiders
- 2019–: Emory Eagles (assistant)
Medal record
Women's soccer
Representing United States
Olympic Games
| Gold medal – first place | 2004 Athens | Team competition |
FIFA Women's World Cup
| Bronze medal – third place | 2003 USA | Team |
| Bronze medal – third place | 2007 China | Team |
- * Club domestic league appearances and goals

Catherine Reddick Whitehill (born Catherine Anne Reddick; February 10, 1982) is an American retired professional soccer defender, who was also an assistant coach of the Boston Breakers in the NWSL. Whitehill last played for the Boston Breakers in 2015 and previously played for the Washington Freedom and the Atlanta Beat in the WPS. She was a member of the United States women's national soccer team from 2000 to 2010; during that time, she earned a gold medal at the 2004 Summer Olympics.

== Early life ==
Whitehill was born in Richmond, Virginia, and grew up in Birmingham, Alabama, attending Briarwood Christian School. While there, she scored 211 goals during her high school career and was the only player to make the top 10 in the single-season category twice (78 in 1999 and 72 in 1999). Whitehill played four years of soccer and three years of basketball at Briarwood. She was named a Parade All-America selection in 1999 and 2000. She was also a four-time All-State selection, the Birmingham News State and Metro Player of the Year in soccer and a two-time Gatorade Soccer Player of the Year for the State of Alabama. Whitehill led the school's basketball team to the state Final Four twice and the soccer team to four high school state titles. In 1999, she was named one of Birmingham Magazine's Top Six People of 1999.

=== University of North Carolina ===
Whitehill played for the University of North Carolina from 2000 to 2003. During her freshman season, she scored four goals and had five assists tallying 13 points after playing in all 24 matches of the season. She received North Carolina's Rookie Player of the Year honors in 2000 and was named an NSCAA Second-Team All-American. She was also named to the All-Tournament Team at the 2000 NCAA Final Four, starting her first game of the season in the NCAA championship game against UCLA helping the Tar Heels win the national title. Her contributions resulted in her being honored as the Most Valuable Defensive Player of the NCAA Final Four. Whitehill was a member of the NSCAA Freshman All-America Team and was named to the Southeast Region All-Freshman Team. As a sophomore, she played in 23 matches, scored three goals and served 10 assists helping the Tar Heels secure an undefeated regular season as well as to the NCAA championship game. During her junior season, she played in just 17 of North Carolina's 27 games due to national team commitments, yet still scored six goals and had five assists. After arriving after a red-eye flight from the CONCACAF Women's Gold Cup Final in Los Angeles to play in the Atlantic Coast Conference (ACC) Championship game in Florida, Whitehill scored 20 seconds after entering the game as a substitute. She added another goal from 40 yards out helping North Carolina clinch the ACC title. She led the Tar Heels to the NCAA Final Four, scoring five goals in the five games leading up to the semifinals, and was named First-Team All-ACC and an NSCAA First-Team All American the same year.

As a senior, Whitehill played in 13 of North Carolina's 27 matches due to playing in the 2003 FIFA Women's World Cup, but started the last 12 games, scoring six goals with five assists. She was awarded the 2003 M.A.C. Hermann Trophy, collegiate soccer's top honor. Her leadership was a key to North Carolina finishing off its regulars season with a 27–0–0 record and the NCAA Championship. She was named Defensive MVP of the Final Four after leading a defense that shut out all six of its opponents in the NCAA Tournament. Whitehill was named to the NCAA All-Tournament Team and received her third NSCAA All-American selection and First-Team All-ACC honors. She was also the Honda Award winner for soccer the same year.

== Club career ==
=== The WPS Years: 2009–2011 ===
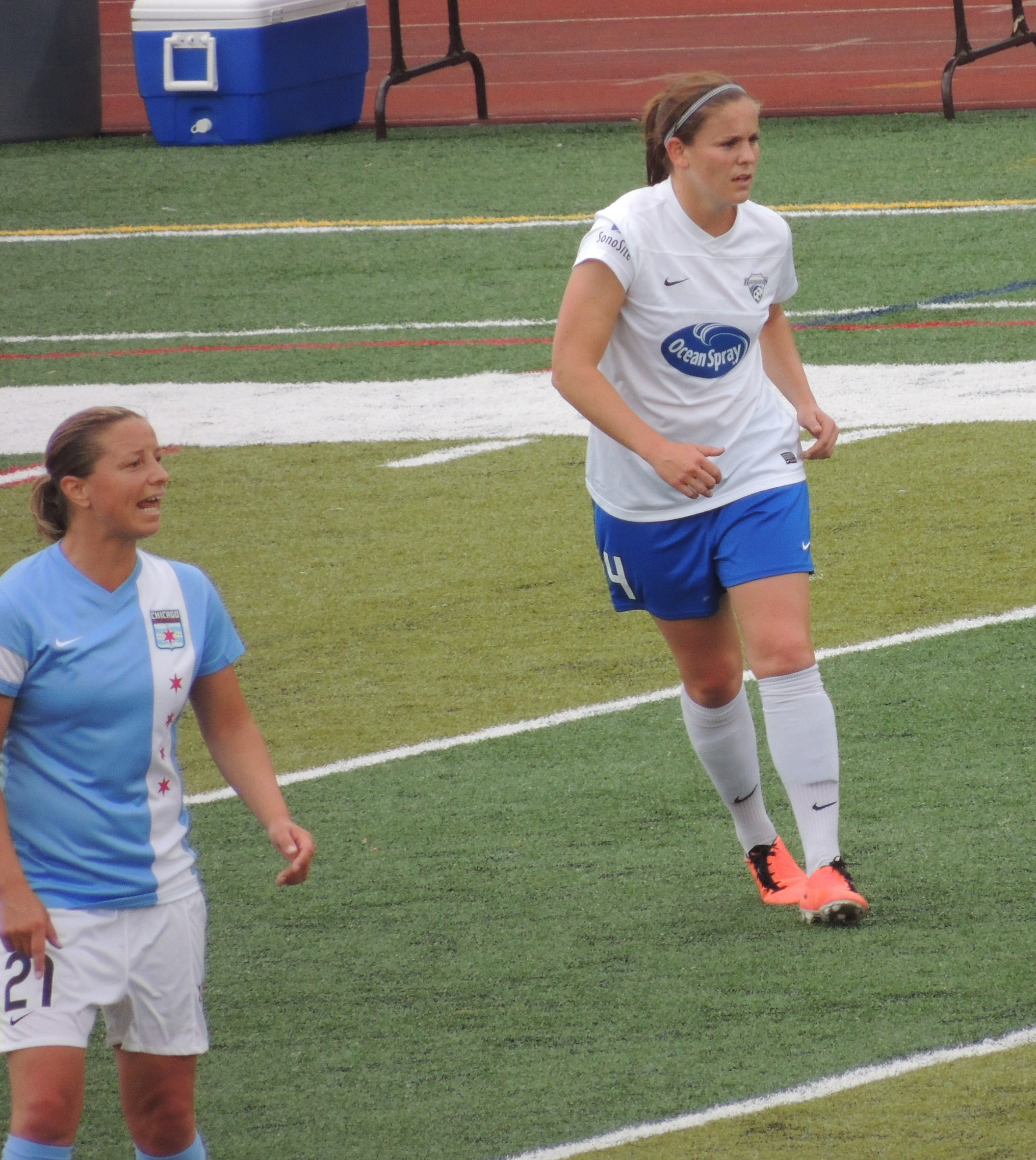
Inka Grings (left) and Whitehill (right) during a match between the Chicago Red Stars and Boston Breakers on June 9, 2013

In 2009, Whitehill signed with the Washington Freedom for the 2009 WPS season. She started in 19 games, scored three goals and added two assists. The following season, she started 23 matches for the Freedom. She scored one goal and tallied two assists and played all 120 minutes of the playoff match against the Philadelphia Independence.

Whitehill signed with the Atlanta Beat for the 2011 WPS season. She made seventeen starts for the club, tallying 1,530 minutes.

=== WPSL Elite: 2012 ===
After the folding of the WPS in early 2012, Whitehill signed with the Boston Breakers in the WPSL, the top division of women's soccer in the United States at the time.

=== NWSL: 2013–2015 ===
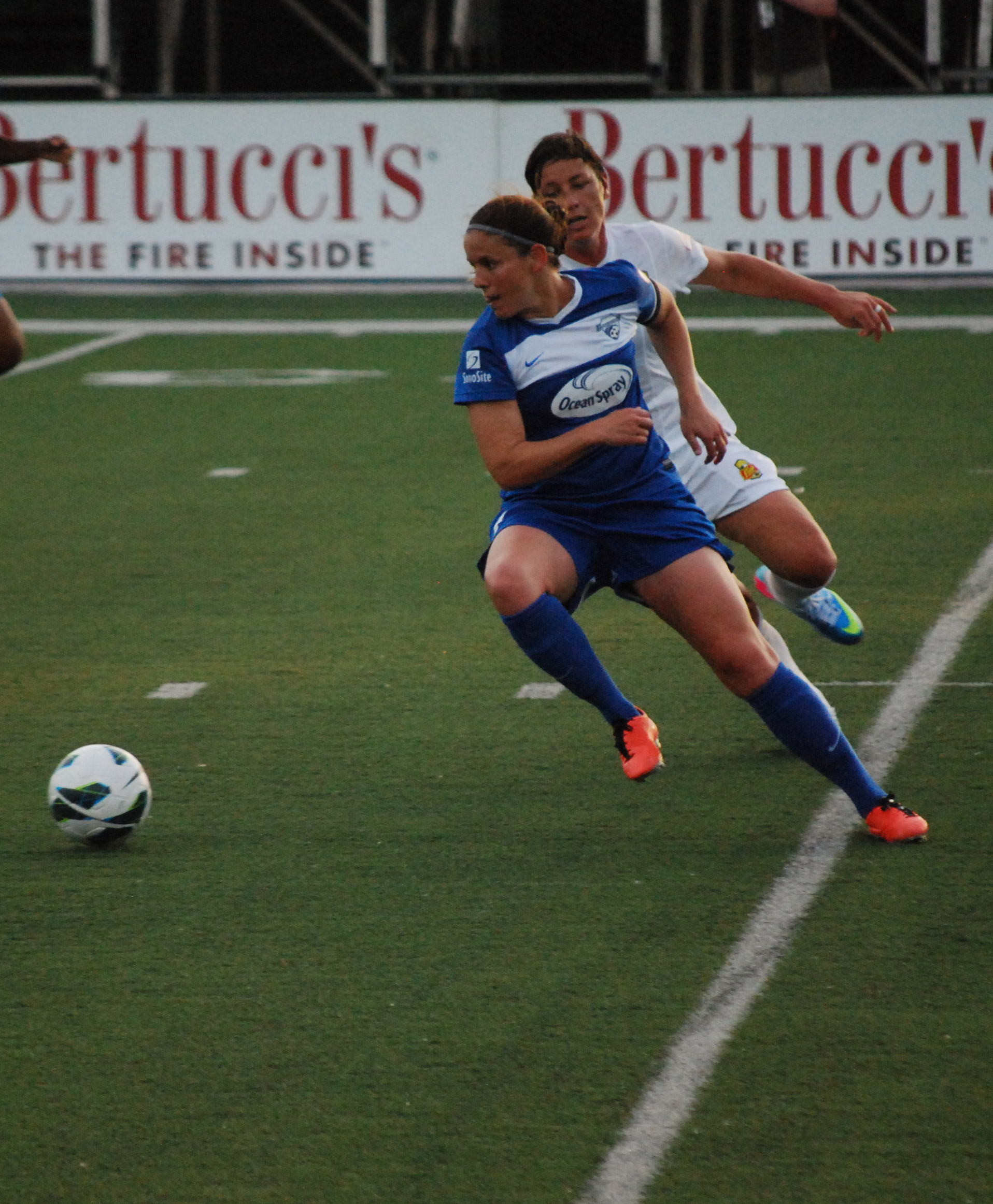
Whitehill defending against Abby Wambach of the Western New York Flash on June 5, 2013.

Whitehill signed with the Boston Breakers for the inaugural season of the National Women's Soccer League. Towards the end of the regular season, Breakers head coach, Lisa Cole, resigned from the team and Whitehill was named player-coach for the remainder of the season. On May 28, 2015 Whitehill announced her retirement from professional soccer citing her "recent injury, and the fact that I will be missing games while commentating this summer during the World Cup" as the main factors to retirement.

== International career ==
Whitehill debuted for the United States women's national soccer team on July 6, 2000, against Italy, and played for the senior team from 2000 to 2010. She was a member of the gold medal-winning team at the 2004 Summer Olympics, in addition to earning bronze at two editions of the FIFA Women's World Cup: 2003 and 2007.

On June 10, 2008, Whitehill injured her knee during training for the Peace Queen Cup, and consequently missing the Beijing 2008 Olympics. Whitehill played her first match for the national team after recovery on July 19, 2009, in a friendly against Canada. She last played for the national team on March 31, 2010, at Rio Tinto Stadium, Sandy, Utah, against Mexico in the first ever snow game for the USWNT.

=== International Goals ===
Whitehill scored 11 goals in 134 matches for the United States women's national soccer team. Whitehill is unusual in having scored more than a few goals while playing in a defender position. On July 15, 2006, at Blaine, Minnesota, she scored a goal from a 70-yard free kick against Sweden, which is the longest shot to have scored a goal for the USWNT.

Key (expand for notes on "international goals" and sorting)
| Location | Geographic location of the venue where the competition occurred Sorted by country name first, then by city name |
| Lineup | Start – played entire match on minute (off player) – substituted on at the minute indicated, and player was substituted off at the same time off minute (on player) – substituted off at the minute indicated, and player was substituted on at the same time (c) – captain Sorted by minutes played |
| # | NumberOfGoals.goalNumber scored by the player in the match (alternate notation to Goal in match) |
| Min | The minute in the match the goal was scored. For list that include caps, blank indicates played in the match but did not score a goal. |
| Assist/pass | The ball was passed by the player, which assisted in scoring the goal. This column depends on the availability and source of this information. |
| penalty or pk | Goal scored on penalty-kick which was awarded due to foul by opponent. (Goals scored in penalty-shoot-out, at the end of a tied match after extra-time, are not included.) |
| Score | The match score after the goal was scored. Sorted by goal difference, then by goal scored by the player's team |
| Result | The final score. Sorted by goal difference in the match, then by goal difference in penalty-shoot-out if it is taken, followed by goal scored by the player's team in the match, then by goal scored in the penalty-shoot-out. For matches with identical final scores, match ending in extra-time without penalty-shoot-out is a tougher match, therefore precede matches that ended in regulation |
| aet | The score at the end of extra-time; the match was tied at the end of 90' regulation |
| pso | Penalty-shoot-out score shown in parentheses; the match was tied at the end of extra-time |
| | Green background color – exhibition or closed door international friendly match |
| | Yellow background color – match at an invitational tournament |
| | Blue background color – FIFA women's world cup final tournament |
NOTE: some keys may not apply for a particular football player

| | Date | Location | Opponent | Lineup | # | Min | Assist/pass | Score | Result | Competition |
|---|---|---|---|---|---|---|---|---|---|---|
| 1 | 2001-03-17 | Quarteira, Portugal | Norway | Start | 1.1 | 56 | unassisted | 3–1 | 3–4 | Algarve Cup: fifth place match |
| 2 | 2003-09-28 | Columbus, United States | Korea DPR | Start | 2.1 | 48 | Julie Foudy | 2–0 | 3–0 | World Cup: Group A |
| 3 | 2003-09-28 | Columbus, United States | Korea DPR | Start | 2.2 | 66 | Shannon MacMillan | 3–0 | 3–0 | World Cup: Group A |
| 4 | 2004-03-18 | Lagos, Portugal | Sweden | Start | 1.1 | 85 | Brandi Chastain | 1–3 | 1–3 | Algarve Cup: Group A |
| 5 | 2004-10-03 | Portland, United States | New Zealand | Start | 1.1 | 81 | Brandi Chastain | 5–0 | 5–0 | Friendly |
| 6 | 2004-10-20 | Chicago, United States | Republic of Ireland | Start | 1.1 | 56 | Mia Hamm | 4–0 | 5–1 | Friendly |
| 7 | 2006-07-15 | Blaine, United States | Sweden | Start | 1.1 | 89 | unassisted | 2–1 | 3–2 | Friendly |
| 8 | 2006-07-23 | San Diego, United States | Republic of Ireland | Start | 2.1 | 39 | Tina Frimpong | 2–0 | 5–0 | Friendly |
| 9 | 2006-07-23 | San Diego, United States | Republic of Ireland | Start | 2.2 | 89 | unassisted | 4–0 | 5–0 | Friendly |
| 10 | 2006-08-27 | Chicago, United States | China | Start | 1.1 | 30 | unassisted | 1–1 | 4–1 | Friendly |
| 11 | 2006-11-02 | Suwon, South Korea | Netherlands | Start | 1.1 | 47+ | unassisted | 2–0 | 2–0 | Peace Queen Cup: Group B |

== Broadcasting career ==
Whitehill was paired with Beth Mowins as a color commentator on ESPN's tertiary broadcast team for the telecasts of the 2011 FIFA Women's World Cup. She has also worked the sidelines for Fox Soccer Channel and for 2012 men's and women's NCAA College Cup matches on ESPNU.

Whitehill worked as a commentator for ESPN3's coverage of the UEFA Women's Euro 2017. She was also the color commentator for the NWSL Game of the week between the Washington Spirit and Boston Breakers on August 12, 2017.

== Coaching career ==
In March 2016, Whitehill was named Assistant Coach and Club Ambassador of the Boston Breakers. Whitehill worked as a coach for Needham Soccer Club during the 2017 season, before being announced as the head coach of the girls soccer program at Wellesley High School later that year.

Since 2019, she has served as an assistant coach for the Emory Eagles.

== Advocacy ==
Whitehill is an advocate for the rights of women to participate in sports. On February 1, 2006, she testified at a committee hearing of the United States Senate in support of Title IX, the civil rights law that, among other things, provides women and girls the same opportunities to participate in school sports that boys and men are offered. In her testimony, she described having to play on boys' soccer teams as a young girl in Alabama because there were no opportunities for girls to play organized soccer there at the time.

== Personal life ==
Whitehill married Dr. Robert Whitehill, a pediatric Cardiology Fellow at Children's Hospital Boston and Boston Medical Center, on New Year's Eve, 2005.
