= Abby Wambach =

American soccer player (born 1980)

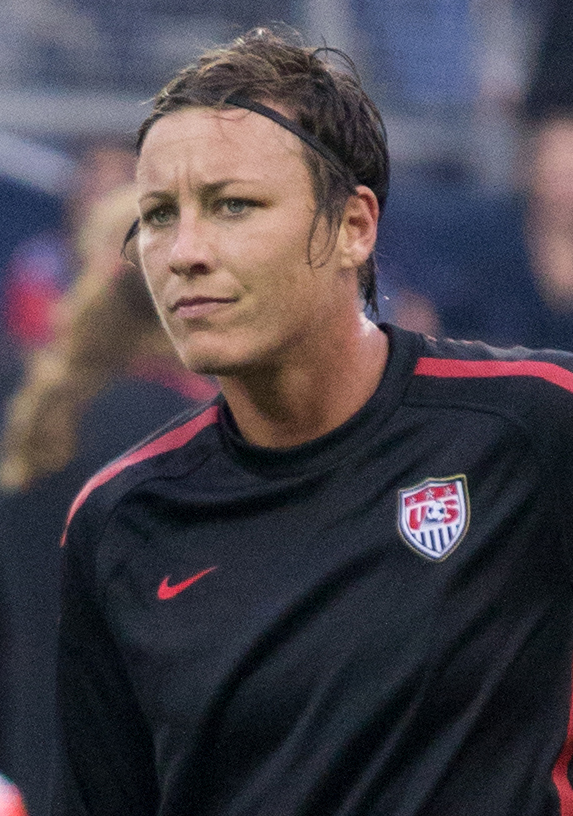
- Wambach warming up in 2011

Personal information
- Full name: Mary Abigail Wambach
- Date of birth: June 2, 1980 (age 46)
- Place of birth: Rochester, New York, U.S.
- Height: 5 ft 11 in (1.80 m)
- Position: Forward

Youth career
- 1994–1998: Our Lady of Mercy High School
- 1995–1997: Rochester Spirit

College career
Years	Team	Apps	(Gls)
1998–2001	Florida Gators	93	(96)

Senior career*
Years	Team	Apps	(Gls)
2002–2003	Washington Freedom	37	(23)
2005	Ajax America Women	3	(5)
2009–2010	Washington Freedom	39	(21)
2011	magicJack	11	(9)
2013–2014	Western New York Flash	29	(17)
Total		119	(75)

International career
2001–2015	United States	255	(184)

Managerial career
- 2011: magicJack (player-coach)
Medal record
Women's soccer
Representing United States
Olympic Games
Gold medal – first place	2004 Athens	Team
Gold medal – first place	2012 London	Team
FIFA World Cup
Winner	2015 Canada
Runner-up	2011 Germany
Bronze medal – third place	2003 United States
Bronze medal – third place	2007 China
- * Club domestic league appearances and goals

Mary Abigail Wambach (born June 2, 1980) is an American former professional soccer player who played as a forward. She played for the U.S. women's national soccer team from 2003 to 2015. With 184 international goals, she ranks second on the all-time list of international goals scored by players of any gender. Wambach is a six-time winner of the U.S. Soccer Athlete of the Year award, and was named the FIFA World Player of the Year in 2012. She was included on the 2015 Time 100 list of the most influential people in the world.

Wambach competed in four editions of the FIFA Women's World Cup, winning the tournament in 2015. She won the gold medal at the Olympics in 2004 and 2012. In college, she helped the Florida Gators women's soccer team win its first NCAA Division I Championship. She played at the professional level for Washington Freedom, magicJack, and the Western New York Flash.

Wambach is known for scoring goals with diving headers. During a quarterfinal match against Brazil at the 2011 FIFA Women's World Cup, Wambach scored a last-minute equalizer goal from a precise cross from Megan Rapinoe, which helped the U.S. secure victory. The goal set a record for the latest goal ever scored in a World Cup match, and received ESPN's ESPY Award for Best Play of the Year. Wambach also won the tournament's Bronze Boot and Silver Ball. In 2011, she became the first soccer player of any gender to be named Athlete of the Year by the Associated Press.

Wambach retired in 2015, playing her last game on December 16 in New Orleans as part of the United States' 10-game Victory Tour following its win at the 2015 FIFA Women's World Cup. Wambach's autobiography, titled Forward, was published in 2016. Her second book, Wolfpack: How to Come Together, Unleash Our Power and Change the Game, was published in 2019. Both books became New York Times Best Sellers.

== Early life ==
Wambach was born to Pete and Judy Wambach in Rochester, New York, and was raised in the Rochester suburb of Pittsford. She is the youngest of seven children, with two sisters and four brothers. She began playing soccer at the age of four after her sister Laura tried the sport. Their mother checked out a book from the library explaining how to play, and from then on soccer became a family tradition. In a 2011 interview, Wambach said her large family felt like a team environment which taught her how to compete. She explained that her siblings never let her win, forcing her to earn her victories. She was toughened up by her elder brothers, who fired hockey pucks at her for target practice. Wambach credited this early competition for her later success.

While playing in her first youth soccer league at age five, Wambach was transferred from the girls' team to the boys' after scoring 27 goals over three games. As a pre-teen, she eluded defenders by heading the ball over them and then running around them. Wambach's brother Matthew described her as fiercely competitive; after he witnessed her tackle a neighbor boy at the age of 11 or 12, he felt she was destined for sports success.

== Youth career ==
Wambach attended Our Lady of Mercy High School in Rochester from 1994 to 1998, where she competed in soccer and basketball. She scored 142 goals during her high school career, including 34 in 1997. Her soccer coach, Kathy Boughton, recalled that Wambach often asked to practice diving headers—a skill which became her trademark as an international player. Following her senior season, Wambach was named to Parade magazine's High School All-America Team, and was voted national high school player of the year by Umbro and the National Soccer Coaches Association of America (NSCAA). In 1997, she was named NSCAA Regional Player of the Year, NSCAA State of New York Player of the Year, Gatorade Circle of Champions New York Player of the Year, and cited by USA Today as one of the nation's top 10 recruits.

Wambach was a three-year captain for the Rochester Spirit club team and was named All-Greater Rochester Player of the Year in 1995 and 1997. She was a member of the Olympic Development Program U-16 National Team in 1996 and the 1997 National U-20 Player Pool. She trained and played with the U.S. women's national soccer team while competing in the 1997 U.S. Soccer Festival in Blaine, Minnesota. In 1997, she was a member of the first American youth soccer team to compete in Beijing, China.

== College career ==
Considered the top college recruit in 1997, Wambach was sought after by numerous colleges, including top soccer programs at the University of North Carolina, UCLA, the University of Portland, and the University of Virginia. Wambach accepted a full athletic scholarship to attend the University of Florida in Gainesville, where she played for coach Becky Burleigh's Florida Gators women's soccer team from 1998 to 2001. Florida's program was only three years old, and the challenge of joining a less-established team appealed to Wambach. As a freshman in 1998, she helped the Gators win their first NCAA national championship over the 15-time champion North Carolina Tar Heels. The Gators also won four consecutive Southeastern Conference (SEC) championships from 1998 to 2001.

Individually, Wambach was the SEC Freshman of the Year (1998), a freshman All-American (1998), a first-team All-SEC selection for four straight seasons (1998–2001), and a two-time SEC Player of the Year (2000, 2001). She twice received SEC Tournament Most Valuable Player honors (2000, 2001), and was named a first-team All-American her sophomore, junior, and senior seasons in 1999, 2000 and 2001. In addition to leading the Gators to the Final Four of the NCAA Division I Women's Soccer Tournament as a senior in 2001, Wambach set school career records for goals scored (96), assists (50), points (242), game-winning goals (24), and hat tricks (10). Wambach was inducted into the University of Florida Athletic Hall of Fame as a "Gator Great" in 2012.

== Club career ==
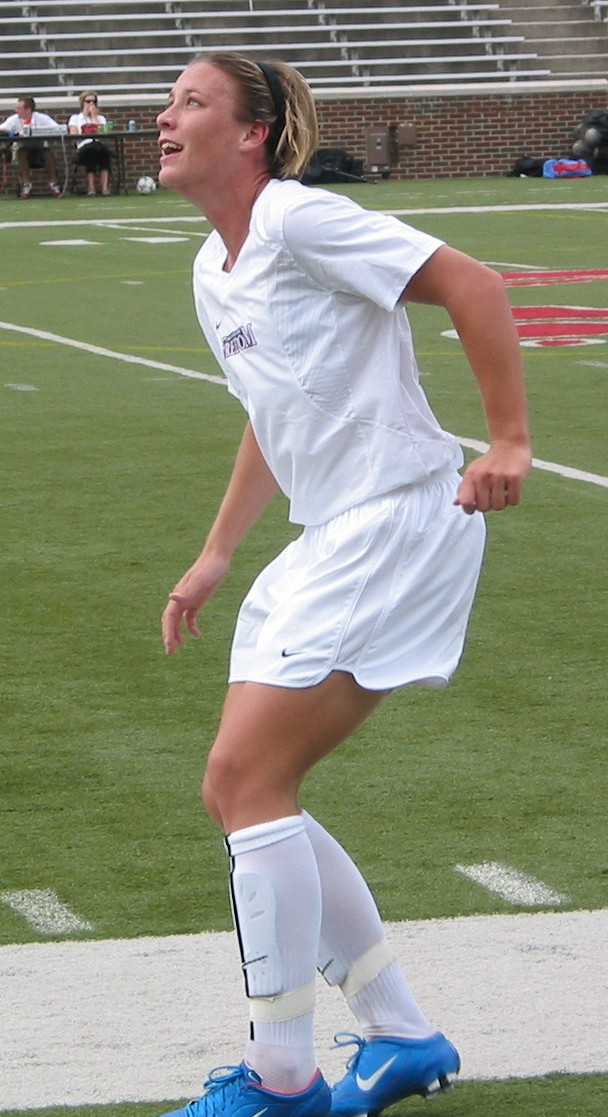
Wambach with the Freedom in 2004

=== 2002–2003: Washington Freedom in the WUSA ===
In 2002, Wambach was selected second during the first round of the WUSA draft by the Washington Freedom for the second season of the Women's United Soccer Association (WUSA). The Freedom had tied for last place with the Carolina Courage the previous season, but were able to finish third in 2002 with a berth in the playoffs. The Freedom upset the Philadelphia Charge 1–0 in the semifinal, then lost 3–2 to the Courage in the final. Wambach served one assist during the final. After leading all first-year players in scoring, Wambach was named 2002 WUSA Rookie of the Year. She was the Freedom's leading scorer with ten goals and ten assists, and was tied for fourth for scoring in the league. She scored twice in the inaugural 2002 WUSA All-Star Game, and was named MVP of the game.

During the 2003 season, Wambach tied with Freedom teammate Mia Hamm for first in league scoring, with 33 points. Her contributions helped propel the Freedom to the championship match of the Founders Cup, where she scored the game-winning goal to defeat the Atlanta Beat 2–1. Wambach was named the MVP of the tournament. (Note: Attributed to multiple references:) Five days before the 2003 FIFA Women's World Cup, the WUSA folded, citing financial difficulties and a lack of sponsorship. In the summer of 2005, Wambach played for Women's Premier Soccer League (WPSL) club Ajax America Women, alongside national teammate Shannon Boxx. Wambach scored five goals and served three assists in three appearances.

=== 2009–2011: Women's Professional Soccer ===
In 2008, a new U.S. women's professional league was announced: Women's Professional Soccer (WPS). Wambach was assigned to the Washington Freedom during the 2008 WPS Player Allocation, which assigned twenty-one players from the U.S. national team player pool to the seven teams in the new league. League play began in March 2009. During the fifth week of play, Wambach was voted WPS Player of the Week after scoring two goals during the Freedom's first win. On May 3, she received a yellow card for a tackle that left St. Louis Athletica midfielder Daniela with two damaged knee ligaments and a crack in the tibia, sidelining her for the rest of the season. Wambach was suspended for one game after the tackle was reviewed by the league commissioner. Wambach was named WPS Player of the Week two more times during the 2009 season. (Note: Attributed to multiple references:) She ended the season with eight goals and was named to the 2009 WPS All-Star Team.

During the 2010 season, Wambach was named Player of the Week in week 2. She received the most votes in 2010 WPS All-Star voting, making her one of two captains for the 2010 WPS All-Star Game. Wambach received 100% of votes from the media and coaches, and received the most fan votes with 31%. In 2011, the Freedom relocated to Boca Raton, Florida and were renamed magicJack under new ownership. On July 22, Wambach was named the team's player-coach for the rest of the 2011 season. She was named Player of the Week for the seventh time in August. On October 26, the WPS League Governors voted to terminate the magicJack franchise. The WPS suspended operations in early 2012.

=== 2013–2014: Western New York Flash in the NWSL ===
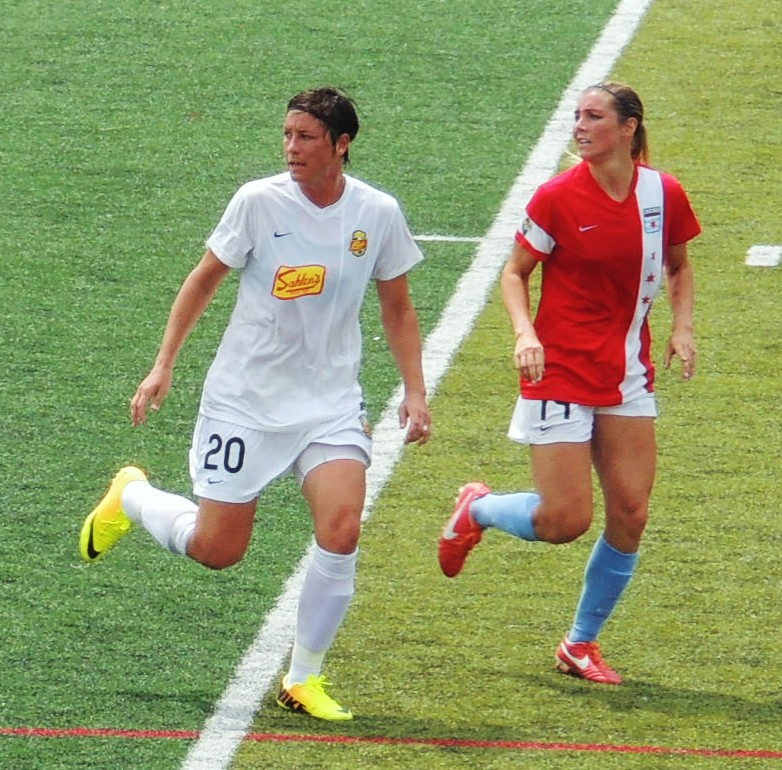
Wambach playing with the Western New York Flash against the Chicago Red Stars on July 4, 2013

In 2012, a new professional women's soccer league was announced in the U.S. that featured allocated players from the American, Mexican, and Canadian national teams. On January 11, 2013, Wambach was allocated to the National Women's Soccer League club Western New York Flash, in her hometown of Rochester, New York. After missing the preseason due to national team commitments, she made her debut on April 14, 2013, during the team's season opener against Sky Blue FC.

During the Flash's second match against the Washington Spirit, Wambach was accidentally struck hard in the face from close range by her teammate Brittany Taylor in the 80th minute. She dropped to the ground and appeared disoriented after standing up. She played the remainder of the match and even attempted to score a goal with her head, but dropped to the ground after the final whistle and was described by Spirit goalkeeper Ashlyn Harris as dazed and mumbling. U.S. Soccer announced several days later that she had suffered a concussion, and acknowledged that the injury should have been handled differently by the referee, coaching staff, and players. Wambach sat out the next game as a precautionary health measure.

Wambach made her home debut for the Flash on May 1 and scored the winning goal to defeat Sky Blue 2–1. It was the team's first league win and lifted them to a three-way tie for third place in the league. Wambach was named NWSL Player of the Week during weeks 5 and 9 of the season. On March 18, 2015, she announced that she was sitting out the entire 2015 NWSL season to focus on the 2015 FIFA Women's World Cup. Two weeks later, Wambach's playing rights were traded along with midfielder Amber Brooks and a first-round pick in the 2016 NWSL college draft to Seattle Reign FC, in exchange for forwards Sydney Leroux and Amanda Frisbie.

== International career ==
No I or individual is better than the team. I've scored no goals just on my own. Every goal I've ever scored has been because of someone else on my team, their excellence, their bravery.

— Abby Wambach

In 2001, Wambach's WUSA and collegiate performance earned her a spot at the training camp for the U.S. women's national soccer team. Her first international match occurred on September 9 against Germany at the Nike U.S. Cup in Chicago. The U.S. won 4–1. She scored her first international goal on April 27, 2002, during a friendly match against Finland in San Jose, California. The U.S. won 3–0.

=== 2003 FIFA Women's World Cup ===
In August 2003, Wambach was named to the U.S. roster by coach April Heinrichs for her first World Cup. She had played in six international matches before the tournament. Wambach made the starting line-up for the first group stage match, a 3–1 win over Sweden. During the second match against Nigeria, Wambach scored a goal as the U.S. achieved a 5–0 victory. She scored another goal during the third group stage match as the U.S. defeated North Korea 3–0. Wambach scored the only goal of the quarterfinal against Norway, bringing her team to the semifinals. The U.S. lost to Germany 3–0 in the semifinal, then defeated Canada 3–1 in a match for third place. During the World Cup, Wambach led the U.S. in scoring with three goals.

=== 2004 Summer Olympics ===
After the WUSA suspended operations in 2003, Wambach trained with the national team in preparation for the 2004 Summer Olympics in Athens, Greece. During the team's first group stage match against Greece on August 11, Wambach scored one goal and received a yellow card as the U.S. won 3–0. During the second match against Brazil, Wambach and Mia Hamm each scored a goal to secure a 2–0 victory. Wambach received another yellow card, resulting in an automatic suspension from her next match. She watched from the sidelines as her team played to a 1–1 tie against Australia in the final group stage match. The U.S. faced Japan in the quarterfinal on August 20, with Wambach's goal in the 59th minute lifting the Americans to a 2–1 victory.

After defeating Germany in the semifinal, the U.S. faced Brazil for a second time in the final. Wambach's 10-yard header in the 112th minute off a corner kick from Kristine Lilly gave the U.S. a 2–1 victory and the gold medal. Wambach finished the tournament with four goals, setting a record for most goals scored by a U.S. player at the Olympics. (Note: Attributed to multiple references:) In 2011, her last-minute goal would be hailed by ESPN as one of the five "biggest" goals in USWNT history. At the end of 2004, Wambach had contributed 31 goals and 13 assists in 30 matches for the national team. She finished fourth in voting for the FIFA Women's World Player of the Year.

After the Olympics, Wambach continued as a major contributor to the national team, scoring goals during the 2005 Algarve Cup and a number of exhibition games. During group play at the Algarve Cup, one of her goals helped the U.S. set a record for the largest goal margin in an Algarve Cup match after their 5–0 win over Denmark. At the end of 2006, Wambach had scored 66 goals in 84 international matches, scoring more goals in fewer games than any player since Michelle Akers. Wambach again finished fourth in voting for the FIFA Women's World Player of the Year award.

=== 2007 FIFA Women's World Cup ===
Heading into the 2007 Women's World Cup in China, the U.S. national team had not lost a game in regulation time in nearly three years and was considered a favorite to win the tournament. Wambach had now been a regular on the team for five years. During the first match against North Korea, Wambach scored one goal before colliding in the air with North Korean defender Ri Kum-Suk. Wambach landed on the ground with blood streaming down her head. She was taken off the field for ten minutes and received five stitches on the back of her head. North Korea scored two goals while Wambach was off the field. Coach Greg Ryan decided not to replace Wambach, who had scored 78 goals in 97 games. A few minutes after she returned to the field, the U.S. scored an equalizer goal. The match concluded as a 2–2 draw.

The U.S. defeated Sweden 2–0 in their next match, with Wambach scoring both goals. She assisted the only goal in the team's final group match, a 1–0 win over Nigeria. During the quarterfinal against England on September 22, Wambach scored the first goal as the U.S. achieved a 3–0 victory. During the first half, English captain Faye White required extensive treatment following an elbow in the face from Wambach. Although Wambach insisted the contact was accidental, the English players and media thought otherwise. The match was Wambach's 100th international match.

For the semifinal against Brazil, Ryan decided to bench starting goalkeeper Hope Solo, and instead started Brianna Scurry, a veteran goalkeeper who had started in three World Cups and two Olympics, but who had played few competitive matches since the 2004 Olympics. The U.S. was defeated 4–0, but managed to secure a third-place finish in the tournament with a 4–1 over Norway. Wambach scored two goals during the third-place match, bringing her 2007 World Cup total to six goals in six matches. (Note: Attributed to multiple references:)

=== 2008–2009: Injury and recovery ===
In June 2008, Wambach was named to the U.S. squad for the upcoming 2008 Summer Olympics in China. On July 16, during an exhibition match against Brazil in California, Wambach collided with Brazilian defender Andréia Rosa while running at full speed. Wambach fell to the ground and immediately signaled for assistance. Her left leg was put in a brace and she was taken off the field on a stretcher. X-rays at a local hospital revealed fractures to her tibia and fibula. She underwent surgery to have a titanium rod inserted into her leg, and was expected to be out of action for three months, causing her to miss the Olympics the following month.

Wambach was devastated by the injury, but was intent on recovering and returning to soccer. She expressed hope that her resilience could inspire others to rebound from setbacks. Wambach's teammates were unsettled by her injury. Natasha Kai said, "My heart sank ... We need her. She's a big piece of a great team." Forward Lauren Cheney was called in to replace Wambach at the Olympics. Despite Wambach's absence, the U.S. won the gold medal after defeating Brazil 1–0 in the final.

Wambach scored her 100th international goal during a friendly match against Canada in her hometown of Rochester on July 19, 2009, her second international match after recovering from her injury. Commenting on the goal, she said, "After this year I've had, the heartbreak of not going to the Olympics, all of that pain is worth it. There's nothing more you can ask for than play in front of your home crowd and come through with a milestone like I did today." She reached the landmark goal in fewer games than any of the four other American players who had previously reached 100 goals: Mia Hamm, Kristine Lilly, Michelle Akers and Tiffeny Milbrett.

=== 2011 FIFA Women's World Cup ===
The 2011 Women's World Cup in Germany was Wambach's third World Cup. Her first goal of the tournament came during the final group stage match, a 2–1 loss to Sweden. (Note: Attributed to multiple references:) During the quarterfinal game against Brazil, Wambach scored a header goal off a cross from Megan Rapinoe in the 122nd minute, which evened the score at 2–2. The U.S. went on to win the game on penalty kicks and advanced to the semifinal. Wambach's goal was the latest goal ever scored in a FIFA competition, and it was awarded ESPN's ESPY Award for Best Play of the Year. (Note: Attributed to multiple references:) Wambach scored her third goal of the tournament during the Americans' 3–1 semifinal win over France.

Video
- Rapinoe's cross to Wambach on YouTube

During the World Cup final against Japan, Wambach's goal in extra time made her the all-time leading American goalscorer in Women's World Cup history. Her 13 total goals brought her to third place internationally for Women's World Cup goals scored, behind Brazil's Marta and Germany's Birgit Prinz, who each had 14 goals. The match went to a penalty shootout, which Japan won, with Wambach scoring the only penalty kick for the United States. Wambach's final tally for the World Cup was four goals and one assist; she was awarded the Bronze Boot and the Silver Ball. All four of Wambach's goals in the tournament were scored using her head. Following the World Cup, Rochester mayor Thomas Richards declared July 20 "Abby Wambach Day" and gave Wambach a key to the city.

=== 2012 Summer Olympics ===
Wambach scored the first goal for the U.S. at the 2012 Summer Olympics in London during the team's first group stage match against France on July 25. Down 2–0 after 14 minutes into the first half, Wambach scored with a header in the 19th minute. By the 30-minute mark, the Americans had tied the game with a goal from Alex Morgan. After another goal from Morgan and one from Carli Lloyd, the U.S. achieved a 4–2 victory. (Note: Attributed to multiple references:)

During the second group stage match, Colombian midfielder Lady Andrade punched Wambach in the face, causing her to fall to the ground. The referees did not seem to notice, and made no call. Wambach scored one goal as the U.S. won 3–0. The goal was her sixth career Olympic goal, which broke the previous U.S. record of five goals held by Mia Hamm and Tiffeny Milbrett. Wambach ended the game with a swollen black eye. After reviewing match footage, FIFA officials imposed a two-match ban on Andrade.

During the United States' third group stage match against North Korea, Wambach scored the only goal as the U.S. won 1–0. During the quarterfinal against New Zealand, Wambach scored her fourth goal of the tournament, then led a celebration of cartwheels—a tribute to the U.S. gymnastics team. The Americans achieved a 2–0 victory and moved on to the semifinals, where Wambach scored one goal in a 4–3 win over Canada. The U.S. defeated Japan 2–1 in the final to win the gold medal. Wambach scored five goals during the tournament, and scored in every match except the final. She was named the 2012 FIFA Women's World Player of the Year on January 7, 2013. Following the Olympics, Wambach's hometown of Rochester honored her by naming the entrance to Sahlen's Stadium "Wambach Way".

=== 2015: World Cup victory and retirement ===
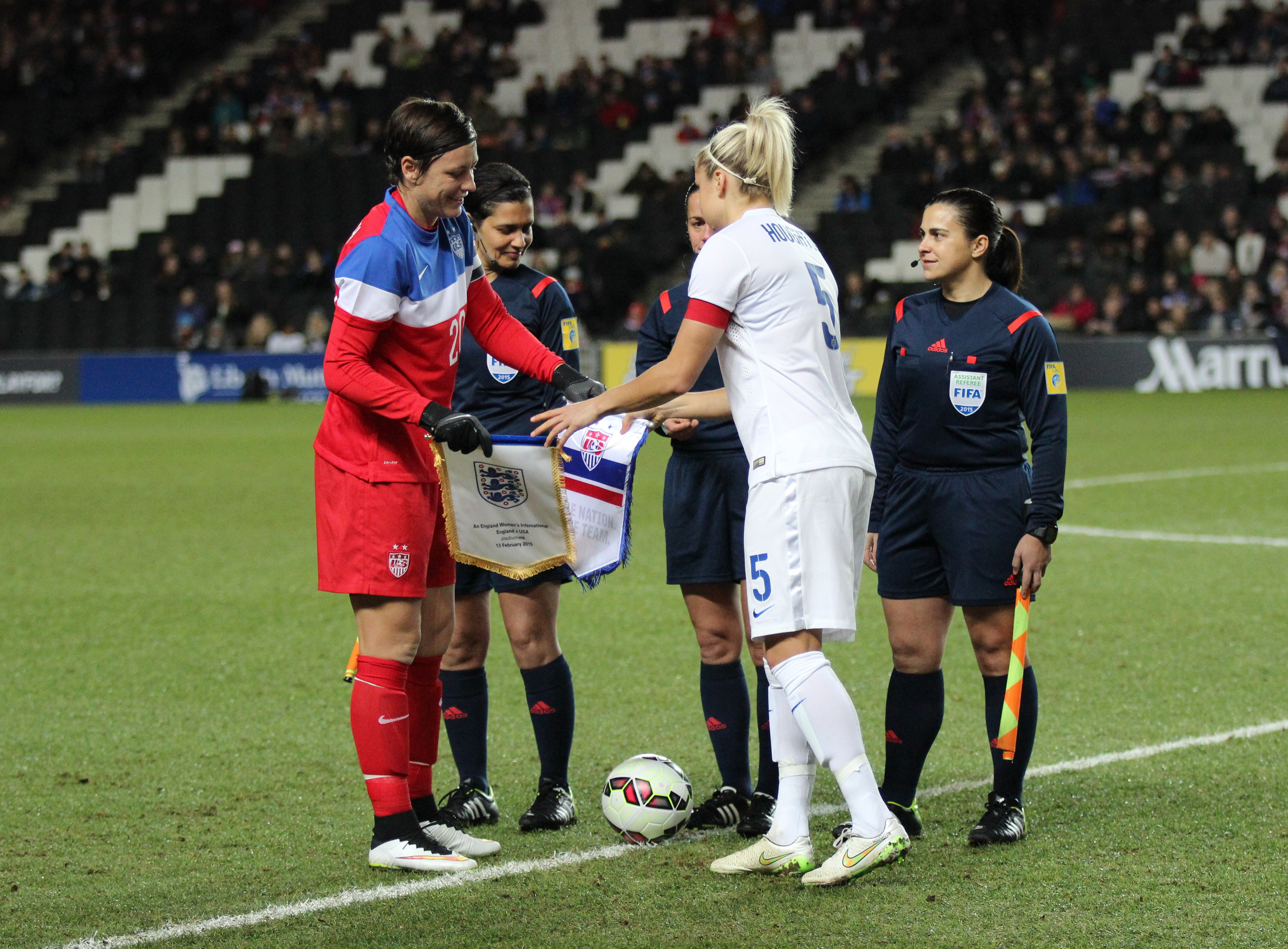
Wambach and England captain Steph Houghton shake hands before kick off on February 13, 2015.

Wambach stated that the 2015 FIFA Women's World Cup in Canada would be her last World Cup. Because the team's nominal captain Christie Rampone was starting every game on the bench, Wambach acted as the starting captain in three games, while Carli Lloyd started as captain in the other four games. During the tournament, Wambach scored in a 1–0 group stage win against Nigeria, which was her last goal in official competition. The goal ensured that the U.S. won their group. The U.S. went on to win the tournament, with Rampone and Wambach lifting the World Cup trophy together. Following the victory, the U.S. team became the first women's sports team to be honored with a ticker tape parade in New York City. Each player received a key to the city from Mayor Bill de Blasio. In October, the team was honored by President Barack Obama at the White House.

The U.S. team played a victory tour of exhibition games after the World Cup. On August 19, in a match against Costa Rica, Wambach scored her 184th international goal. She would hold the record for most international goals by a player of any gender until Christine Sinclair surpassed her in 2020. The tour's December 16 match against China was Wambach's final match with the team before retirement. On the day of her final match, Wambach criticized Jürgen Klinsmann, the head coach of the U.S. men's national soccer team, for recruiting foreign-born players with dual citizenship. She said Klinsmann had not focused enough on developing youth soccer programs in the U.S., and she called for him to be fired. Mix Diskerud, a midfielder for the men's team who was born in Norway to an American mother, rebuked Wambach for her criticism. He accused her of trying to "disenfranchise" U.S. players who were not raised in the United States.

== Style of play ==
Wambach was known in particular for her goalscoring ability. Although she was not the quickest or most technically gifted forward, she was known for her physical, effective, and direct style of play, as well as her excellent sense of space and positioning, which allowed her to get onto the end of long balls and crosses, and to make passes with back headers and backheels. Her height and physique allowed her to excel in the air, and she was renowned for her ability to score with her head, frequently producing goals from diving headers. (Note: Attributed to multiple references:) Although primarily a striker, Wambach was also known for her energy and work rate, ranking third all-time on the national team for number of assists. She could play anywhere along the front line, and would often drop into the midfield to assist her teammates defensively and help start attacking plays. (Note: Attributed to multiple references:) Wambach has also been praised for her determination, tenacity, and leadership.

== Endorsements ==
During her career, Wambach signed endorsement deals with Gatorade, Nike, MVP Healthcare, Bank of America and Panasonic. (Note: Attributed to multiple references:) She has appeared in commercials for Dodge, ESPN SportsCenter, magicJack phone service, the LED lighting company Cree, and the New York Apple Association. (Note: Attributed to multiple references:)

== Philanthropy ==
Wambach has done philanthropic work for the Epilepsy Foundation and Juvenile Diabetes Research Foundation. She has participated in Mia Hamm's annual Celebrity Soccer Challenge, which raises funds for Children's Hospital Los Angeles and the Mia Hamm Foundation. In August 2011, Wambach joined her national teammates Alex Morgan and Hope Solo in a Bank of America charitable campaign at the Chicago Marathon. A donation of $5,000 was made to the Juvenile Diabetes Association on her behalf. In 2013, she became an ambassador for Athlete Ally, a nonprofit organization that seeks to end homophobia and transphobia in sports. Wambach serves on the board of Together Rising, an all-women-led organization founded by her wife, Glennon Doyle, that supports women, families, and children in crisis.

== In popular culture ==
=== Television and film ===
Wambach appeared in the HBO film, Dare to Dream: The Story of the U.S. Women's Soccer Team. She has made appearances on the Today Show, the Late Show with David Letterman, The Daily Show with Jon Stewart, and Good Morning America. She was featured on ESPN's In the Game with Robin Roberts in June 2012. In 2013, Wambach's biography was the focus of a one-hour ESPN documentary, Abby Head On. The same year, she appeared in the ESPN documentary series Nine for IX.

In April 2015, Wambach joined Alex Morgan on American Idol to announce that the show's season winner would record the official song for Fox's coverage of the 2015 FIFA Women's World Cup. In May of the same year, her likeness appeared on The Simpsons. In 2021, Wambach began hosting the series "Abby's Places", which is part of the Peyton's Places franchise on ESPN+.

=== Magazines ===
Wambach posed nude in The Body Issue of ESPN The Magazine in 2012. She said, "My body is very different than most other females. ... I want to show people that no matter who you are, no matter what shape you are, that's still beautiful." The following month, she was featured on the cover of ESPN The Magazine with national teammates Sydney Leroux and Alex Morgan. The same year, she appeared on multiple covers of Sports Illustrated. (Note: Attributed to multiple references:)

=== Games and toys ===
Wambach has appeared as a playable character in the FIFA video game series. In 2016, Mattel unveiled an Abby Wambach Barbie doll.

== Personal life ==
In October 2013, Wambach married Sarah Huffman, her teammate on the Western New York Flash. Following their wedding, Wambach stated that her marriage did not represent a coming out, because she had never been closeted: "I can't speak for other people, but for me, I feel like gone are the days that you need to come out of a closet. I never felt like I was in a closet ... I always felt comfortable with who I am and the decisions I made." In September 2016, Wambach announced that she and Huffman were divorcing. Two months later, Wambach confirmed she was in a relationship with author Glennon Doyle. The couple married on May 14, 2017, and as of 2022 they live in Hermosa Beach, California. Wambach, Doyle, and Doyle's ex-husband Craig Melton co-parent Doyle and Melton's three children. Wambach and Doyle are part owners of the Los Angeles soccer club Angel City FC.

On April 2, 2016, Wambach was arrested by police in Portland, Oregon for driving under the influence of intoxicants. (Note: Attributed to multiple references:) She pleaded guilty to the charge. Following the incident, automaker MINI withdrew a commercial featuring Wambach. In her autobiography, which was released several months after the incident, Wambach wrote that she had abused prescription drugs and alcohol for many years, and had been sober since her arrest.

Wambach was a supporter of Hillary Clinton's 2016 primary election campaign and spoke at several campaign events. Wambach's autobiography, titled Forward, was published in 2016. Her second book, Wolfpack: How to Come Together, Unleash Our Power and Change the Game, based on her viral commencement speech at Barnard College, was published in 2019. Both books became New York Times Best Sellers.

== Career statistics ==
=== Club ===
Appearances and goals by club, season and competition
Club	Season	League			Playoffs (Note: Include WUSA playoffs, WPS playoffs and NWSL playoffs)		Total	
Club	Season	Division	Apps	Goals	Apps	Goals	Apps	Goals
Washington Freedom	2002	WUSA	19	10	2	0	21	10
Washington Freedom	2003	WUSA	18	13	2	2	20	15
Washington Freedom	2009	WPS	17	8	1	0	18	8
Washington Freedom	2010	WPS	22	13	1	0	23	13
magicJack	2011	WPS	11	9	2	2	13	11
Western New York Flash	2013	NWSL	19	11	2	0	21	11
Western New York Flash	2014	NWSL	10	6	—		10	6
Career total			116	70	10	4	126	74

=== International goals ===
Wambach scored 184 goals in 255 appearances for the U.S. women's national team. She is second in the world for international goals scored by players of any gender.

== Honors ==
=== University of Florida ===
- NCAA Division I Champion: 1998
- 4x First-Team All-SEC: 1998–2001
- 2x First-Team All-American: 1999, 2001

=== Club ===
- WUSA Rookie of the Year: 2002
- 7x WPS Player of the Week

=== United States ===
- 2x FIFA Women's World Cup third place: 2003, 2007
- 2x Olympic gold medalist: 2004, 2012
- FIFA Women's World Cup second place: 2011
- FIFA Women's World Cup Bronze Boot: 2011
- FIFA Women's World Cup Silver Ball: 2011
- FIFA Women's World Player of the Year: 2012
- FIFA Women's World Cup champion: 2015

=== Other honors ===
- 6x U.S. Soccer Player of the Year: 2003, 2004, 2007, 2010, 2011, 2013
- ESPY Award for Best Play: 2011
- Women's Sports Foundation Sportswoman of the Year: 2011
- Associated Press Female Athlete of the Year: 2011
- Out magazine Athlete of the Year: 2015
- Time 100 Most Influential People: 2015
- ESPY Icon Award: 2016
- National Soccer Hall of Fame: 2019
- Fast Company Queer 50: 2022

== See also ==
- List of FIFA Women's World Cup winning players
- List of players who have appeared in multiple FIFA Women's World Cups
- List of women's footballers with 100 or more international goals
- List of Olympic medalists in football
- List of University of Florida Olympians
