= Parrissa Eyorokon =

American soccer player (born 1986)

Personal information
- Full name: Parrissa Amouhan-Etchi Eyorokon
- Date of birth: September 15, 1986 (age 40)
- Place of birth: West Chester Township, Ohio, United States
- Height: 5 ft 5 in (1.65 m)
- Position: Midfielder

College career
Years	Team	Apps	(Gls)
2004–2007	Purdue Boilermakers		

Senior career*
Years	Team	Apps	(Gls)
2009	Washington Freedom	4	(0)

International career
2009	United States U-23	2	(0)
- * Club domestic league appearances and goals

Parrissa Amouhan-Etchi Eyorokon (born September 15, 1986) is an American soccer midfielder who last played for Washington Freedom of Women's Professional Soccer. She attended Purdue University.
