= Briana Scurry =

American soccer player (born 1971)

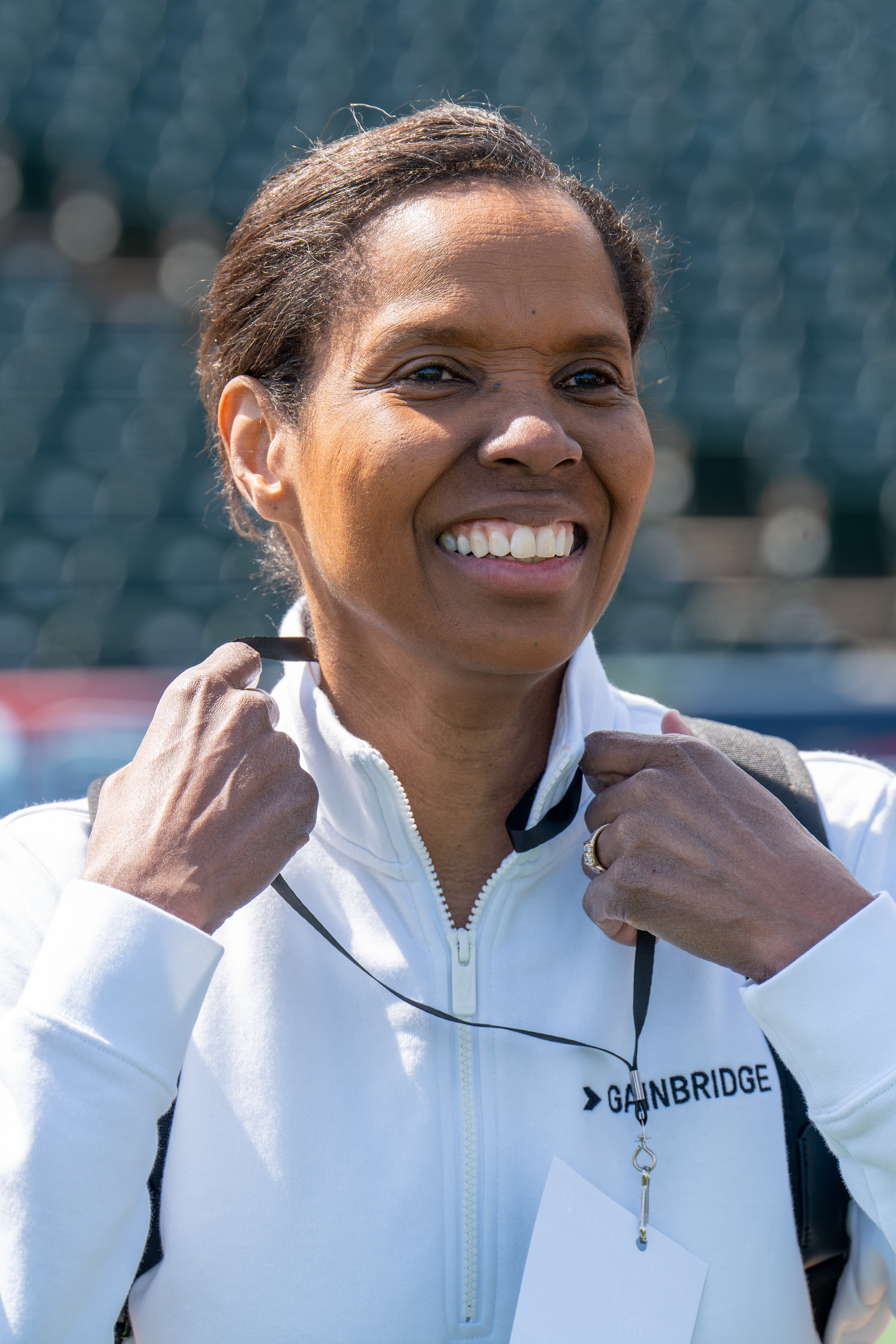
- Scurry in 2026

Personal information
- Full name: Briana Collette Scurry
- Date of birth: September 7, 1971 (age 55)
- Place of birth: Minneapolis, Minnesota, U.S.
- Height: 5 ft 9 in (1.75 m)
- Position: Goalkeeper

Youth career
- 1986–1989: Anoka High School

College career
Years	Team	Apps	(Gls)
1989–1993	UMass Minutewomen		

Senior career*
Years	Team	Apps	(Gls)
2001–2003	Atlanta Beat		
2009–2010	Washington Freedom		

International career
1994–2008	United States	175	(0)

Managerial career
- 2018: Washington Spirit (assistant)
Medal record
Women's football (soccer)
Representing the United States
Olympic Games
Gold medal – first place	1996 Atlanta	Team competition
Gold medal – first place	2004 Athens	Team competition
Silver medal – second place	2000 Sydney	Team competition
FIFA Women's World Cup
Gold medal – first place	1999 USA	Team competition
Bronze medal – third place	1995 Sweden	Team competition
Bronze medal – third place	2003 USA	Team competition
Bronze medal – third place	2007 China	Team competition
- * Club domestic league appearances and goals

Briana Collette Scurry (born September 7, 1971) is an American retired soccer goalkeeper. Scurry was the starting goalkeeper for the United States women's national soccer team at the 1995 World Cup (3rd place), 1996 Summer Olympics (gold medal), 1999 World Cup (champions), 2003 World Cup (3rd place), and the 2004 Summer Olympic Games (gold medal). She played in the semi-final and playoff for third place in the 2007 Women's World Cup (3rd place). She was a founding member of the WUSA, playing three seasons as starting goalkeeper for the Atlanta Beat (2001–2003).

Her career total of 173 international appearances is the second most among female soccer goalkeepers. It is also the fifteenth most of any American female player, and the thirty-second most among all women.

Scurry was elected to the National Soccer Hall of Fame on August 3, 2017. She was the first woman goalkeeper and first black woman to be awarded the honor. She is openly gay, and on June 1, 2018, she married Chryssa Zizos, CEO of Live Wire Strategic Communications, LLC.

In 2022, Scurry released her best-selling memoir, My Greatest Save. Scurry was also the subject of The Only, a CBS feature-length documentary chronicling her life that was released in 2022.

== Early life ==
Scurry was born in Minneapolis, Minnesota to Ernest and Robbie Scurry. She is the youngest of nine children, with three brothers and five sisters.

She played goalie for the Anoka High School Tornadoes for four years and was instrumental in their Minnesota State Championship win in 1989 which ended in a shootout victory. In high school, Scurry ran track and played floor hockey and softball, but basketball was her first and deepest love.

Scurry was named Anoka High School's Athena Award winner as the school's top female athlete. She was also named High School All American and Minnesota's top female athlete.

In 2010, she was inducted into the Minnesota State High School Hall of Fame. In September 2011, Scurry was named to the inaugural class of the Anoka High School Hall of Fame.

== University of Massachusetts ==
Scurry attended the University of Massachusetts Amherst and completed her four-year collegiate career with 37 shutouts in 65 starts and with a career record of 48–13–4 and a 0.56 goals-against-average. She split time in the net in 1992 during her junior season, starting 13 games and earning seven shutouts. Scurry played three games in 1992 as a forward.

In 1993, she helped lead the UMass Minutewomen to a 17–3–3 record, to the semifinals of the NCAA Women's Soccer Championship and the titles of the Atlantic 10 Conference regular season and tournament. In her senior season, she started all 23 games and recorded 15 shutouts and a 0.48 goals-against average, the third best in the nation.

Scurry was named the National Goalkeeper of the Year in 1993 by the Missouri Athletic Club Sports Foundation and was a 1993 second-team All-American, All-Northeast Region and All-New England first-team selection.

== Playing career ==
=== Club ===
Scurry was a founding player for the Atlanta Beat in the Women's United Soccer Association (WUSA), the world's first women's league where the players were paid as professionals. She was the starting goalkeeper for the three seasons (2001–2003) of the league. She helped the Beat to two WUSA Championship Games and was named the league's Goalkeeper of the Year in 2003.

On March 13, 2009, Scurry was named to the preseason roster of the Washington Freedom, in the inaugural season of Women's Professional Soccer (WPS). She suffered a season-ending concussion early in the 2010 season, and announced her retirement later that year on September 8.

=== International ===
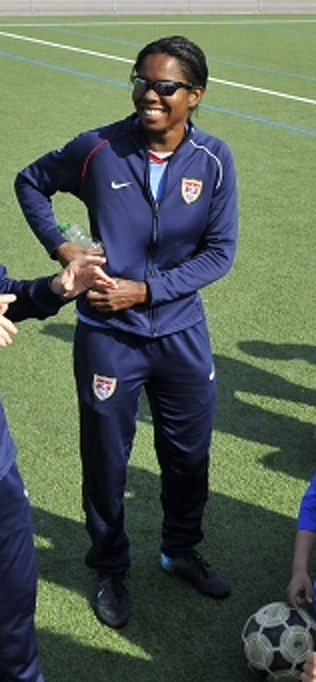
Scurry in 2011

Scurry was a goalkeeper for the United States women's national soccer team for most of the years between 1994 and 2008, earning a record 173 caps for the United States. She started 159 of those games and finished her international career with a record of 133–12–14. She also earned 71 shutouts.

Scurry's first appearance for the United States women's national soccer team was March 16, 1994, versus Portugal. Her first shutout was recorded the same day. In her first year with the US, she earned seven shutouts in 12 starts.

She was a member of the Gold Medal-winning US Women's National Team at the 1996 Olympic Games in Atlanta where she started and played in every minute of the team's five matches conceding only three goals.

Scurry played every minute of the 1999 Women's World Cup allowing only three goals and recording four shutouts. She saved one penalty during the shootout in the final against China and the United States won. Following the World Cup, Scurry announced her intention to play in the WNBA.

She started for the US in the 2003 FIFA Women's World Cup and 2004 Summer Olympic Games. She also played two matches for the US in the 2007 FIFA Women's World Cup and was the alternate goalkeeper on the 2008 Olympic Team.

On June 23, 2008, United States Women's Olympic soccer coach Pia Sundhage announced that Scurry would not be on the Olympic team. Her last match for the United States was on November 5, 2008, against the Korea Republic.

=== Traumatic brain injury and recovery ===
While playing in the Women's Professional Soccer league in 2010, Scurry suffered a traumatic brain injury when a player from the opposing team collided with her knee into Scurry's right temple. The injury left Scurry temporarily totally disabled and she dealt with severe depression. To address her symptoms, Scurry underwent occipital nerve surgery in 2013. Scurry has since rebuilt her life and become an advocate for increased concussion awareness and research, testifying before Congress twice.

== Sports administration ==
Scurry was appointed general manager of the WPS franchise magicJack beginning with the 2011 season.

In February 2021, The Washington Post reported that Chelsea Clinton, Jenna Bush Hager, Dominique Dawes and Scurry were part of an investment group investing in the Washington Spirit.

== Broadcasting ==
Scurry was part of the rotation of studio commentators for ESPN's telecasts of the 2011 FIFA Women's World Cup.

Since 2021, Scurry has served as a broadcast analyst for CBS soccer coverage. In 2022, she served as the lead desk analyst for the 2022 CONCACAF W Championship.

== Coaching ==
On December 6, 2017, Scurry was announced as the First Assistant Coach of the Washington Spirit and would serve as Technical Advisor for the Spirit Academy programs in Maryland and Virginia.

== Honors and awards ==
- 1989 High School All-American
- 1989 Minnesota's High School Female Athlete of the Year
- 1993 All-New England, All-Northeast Region, and All-American
- 1993 National Collegiate Goalkeeper of the Year
- 1994 Most Valuable Player, Chiquita Cup
- 1994 Algarve Cup 2nd Place
- 1995 World Cup Bronze Medalist
- 1996 Olympic Gold Medalist
- 1998 Goodwill Games Gold Medalist
- 1999 Algarve Cup 2nd place
- 1999 World Cup Champion
- 1999 Best Goalkeeper Award -World Cup
- 2000 Algarve Cup runner up
- 2000 CONCACAF Gold Cup Champion
- 2000 Olympic Silver Medalist
- 2001 All-WUSA Second Team
- 2002 All-WUSA Second Team
- 2003 All-WUSA First Team
- 2003 WUSA Goalkeeper of the Year
- 2003 Algarve Cup Champion
- 2003 World Cup Bronze Medalist
- 2004 Algarve Cup Champion
- 2004 Olympic Gold Medalist
- 2005 UMass Athletics Hall of Fame
- 2006 CONCACAF Gold Cup Champion
- 2007 Algarve Cup Champion
- 2008 Peace Queen Cup Champion
- 2008 Four Nations Tournament Champion
- 2008 CONCACAF Tournament Champion
- 2014 UMass Minutewomen No. 1 retired
- 2017 National Soccer Hall of Fame
- 2019: For their first match of March 2019, the women of the United States women's national soccer team each wore a jersey with the name of a woman they wanted to honor; goalkeeper Adrianna Franch chose Scurry.
- In Dayton, Minnesota where Scurry grew up, there is a soccer park named in her honor.
- Her U.S. national soccer team jersey is in a permanent display at the Smithsonian's National Museum of African American History and Culture.

== Film and television ==
Scurry appeared as a fictionalized version of herself in the 2000 film Air Bud: World Pup. She was also the subject of the 2022 Paramount Plus documentary The Only, which was directed by Anthony J. Cortese and featured interviews with other USWNT players such as Mia Hamm, Brandi Chastain, Kristine Lilly, and Abby Wambach.
