= Kati Jo Spisak =

American soccer player and coach

Kati Jo "KJ" Spisak
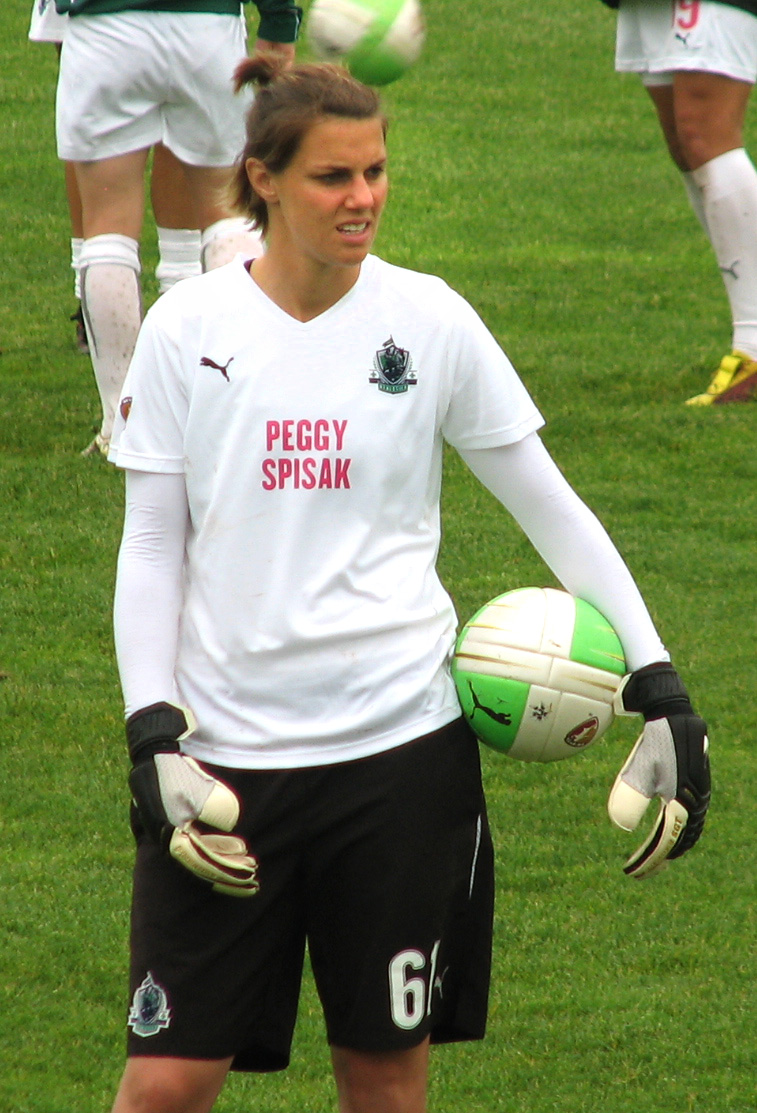
- Spisak playing for St. Louis Athletica

Personal information
- Full name: Kati Jo Spisak
- Date of birth: November 22, 1983 (age 42)
- Place of birth: St. Louis, Missouri
- Height: 6 ft 2 in (1.88 m)
- Position: Goalkeeper

College career
| Years | Team | Apps | (Gls) |
| 2002–2005 | Texas A&M Aggies | | |

Senior career*
| Years | Team | Apps | (Gls) |
| 2007–2009 | Washington Freedom | | |
| 2010 | Saint Louis Athletica | | |
| 2011 | Boston Breakers | | |

International career
| 2004 | United States U-21 | | |
- United States U-23

Managerial career
- 2014–2021: Washington Spirit (assistant)
- * Club domestic league appearances and goals

Kati Jo Spisak (born November 22, 1983) is an American professional soccer coach and retired American soccer player who played as a goalkeeper. She is currently a super agent in Women's Soccer and owns her own boutique agency, Spisak Agency, in the National Women's Soccer League.

== Playing career ==
=== College ===
Spisak attended Texas A&M University where she was a three time All-American and team captain, and repeatedly on the Herman Trophy list. She would also earn team honors as Newcomer of the Year (2002) and Defensive MVP (2003). Spisak was inducted to the Texas A&M Hall of Fame in 2018.

=== Club ===
==== Washington Freedom ====
After college, Spisak began her professional career with Washington Freedom. She would step into starting goalkeeper .

During the restructuring of the W-League into the new Women's Professional Soccer as the top flight women's league, the Washington Freedom officially drafted Spisak.

==== Saint Louis and Boston ====
Ahead of the 2010 season, Spisak joined Saint Louis Athletica, competing with Hope Solo. Athletica would fold mid-way during the season, releasing all rostered players as free agents.

After Athletica folded, Spisak joined Boston Breakers.

=== International ===
Spisak was named to the United States U-21 team that competed and won the 2004 Nordic Cup.

== Managing career ==
Ahead of the 2014 season, Spisak would return to Washington as an assistant coach for the Washington Spirit, supporting Mark Parsons.

She also worked as head coach of the Washington Spirit Reserves and guided the team to their first W-League Title in 2015.

== Honors ==
=== Manager ===
==== Washington Spirit Reserves ====
- W-League: 2015

== Personal life ==
In September 2025, Spisak was engaged to Columbia University interim president Claire Shipman.
