= Emily Janss =

American association footballer

Personal information
- Full name: Emily Suzanne Janss
- Date of birth: July 1, 1978 (age 48)
- Place of birth: Tampa, Florida, United States
- Height: 5 ft 3 in (1.60 m)
- Position: Defender

College career
Years	Team	Apps	(Gls)
1996–1999	Maryland Terrapins		

Senior career*
Years	Team	Apps	(Gls)
2000	Maryland Pride		
2001–2003	New York Power		(19)
2004	Chicago Cobras		
2005–2009	Washington Freedom	26	(1)
2007	Fortuna Hjørring	10	(2)
2010	Maryland Pride		
- * Club domestic league appearances and goals as of December 11, 2009 ‡ National team caps and goals as of December 11, 2009

Emily Suzanne Janss (born July 1, 1978) is an American soccer defender who last played for Washington Freedom of Women's Professional Soccer. She is currently an assistant coach at Loyola University Maryland.
