= Katie Larkin =

American soccer player (born 1987)

Personal information
- Full name: Katie Larkin Allen
- Birth name: Katie Larkin
- Date of birth: March 19, 1987 (age 39)
- Place of birth: Draper, Utah, United States
- Height: 5 ft 5 in (1.65 m)
- Position: Midfielder

College career
Years	Team	Apps	(Gls)
2005–2008	BYU Cougars		

Senior career*
Years	Team	Apps	(Gls)
2009	Los Angeles Sol	14	(0)
2010	Atlanta Beat	11	(0)
Total		26	(0)
- * Club domestic league appearances and goals

Katie Larkin Allen (née Larkin; born March 19, 1987) is an American soccer midfielder who played for the Atlanta Beat of Women's Professional Soccer.

== College ==
She played her collegiate years at Brigham Young University where she was a 3-time All American and Hermann Trophy Candidate. She totaled 37 Goals and 17 Assists in 86 appearances for the Cougars.

== Professional ==
After graduating from BYU Katie Larkin was drafted by the Los Angeles Sol of the WPS with the 19th overall pick in 2009. She played one season for the Sol before being entered into the expansion draft and selected by the Atlanta Beat with the 6th overall pick. Following the collapse of the WPS in 2012 Katie Larkin left the Beat and has not returned to the professional ranks.

== Statistics ==
=== College ===
Year	Games	Shots	Goals	Assists
2005	21	64	4	6
2006	20	68	7	5
2007	23	72	15	5
2008	22	66	11	1
Career	86	270	37	17

=== Professional ===
Year	Team	Games	Goals	Assists
2009	Los Angeles Sol	15	0	0
2010	Atlanta Beat	11	0	0
Career		26	0	0
