= Jill Gilbeau =

American soccer player (born 1987)

Personal information
- Full name: Jillian May Gilbeau
- Date of birth: May 21, 1987 (age 39)
- Place of birth: Oakland, California, United States
- Height: 5 ft 5 in (1.65 m)
- Position: Defender

Youth career
- Laguna Hills Eclipse SC

College career
Years	Team	Apps	(Gls)
2005–2008	Texas Longhorns		

Senior career*
Years	Team	Apps	(Gls)
2007	San Diego WFC SeaLions		
2008–2010	Washington Freedom	41	(3)
- * Club domestic league appearances and goals as of 21:48, December 11, 2009 (UTC) ‡ National team caps and goals as of 21:48, December 11, 2009 (UTC)

Jillian May Gilbeau (born May 21, 1987) is an American soccer defender currently playing for Washington Freedom of Women's Professional Soccer.
