= Alex Singer (soccer) =

American soccer player (born 1987)

Personal information
- Full name: Alexandra Singer
- Date of birth: November 18, 1987 (age 38)
- Place of birth: New York City, United States
- Height: 5 ft 9 in (1.75 m)
- Position: Defender

Team information
- Current team: Houston Dash (general manager)

Youth career
- –2000: Albertson Express
- 2001–2005: Rye Garnets

College career
Years	Team	Apps	(Gls)
2005–2008	Virginia Cavaliers		

Senior career*
Years	Team	Apps	(Gls)
2006	Long Island Fury	4	(0)
2007–2010	Washington Freedom	36	(0)
2009–2011	Perth Glory	19	(1)
2011–2012	Dalsjöfors GoIF	22	(1)
2012–2014	Turbine Potsdam	44	(0)
2014–2015	Washington Spirit	17	(0)
2015	Avaldsnes IL	2	(0)
- * Club domestic league appearances and goals as of July 17, 2018 ‡ National team caps and goals as of May 12, 2013

Alexandra Singer (born November 18, 1987) is an American sports executive and former professional soccer player who played as a defender. She is the former general manager of Houston Dash.

== Playing career ==
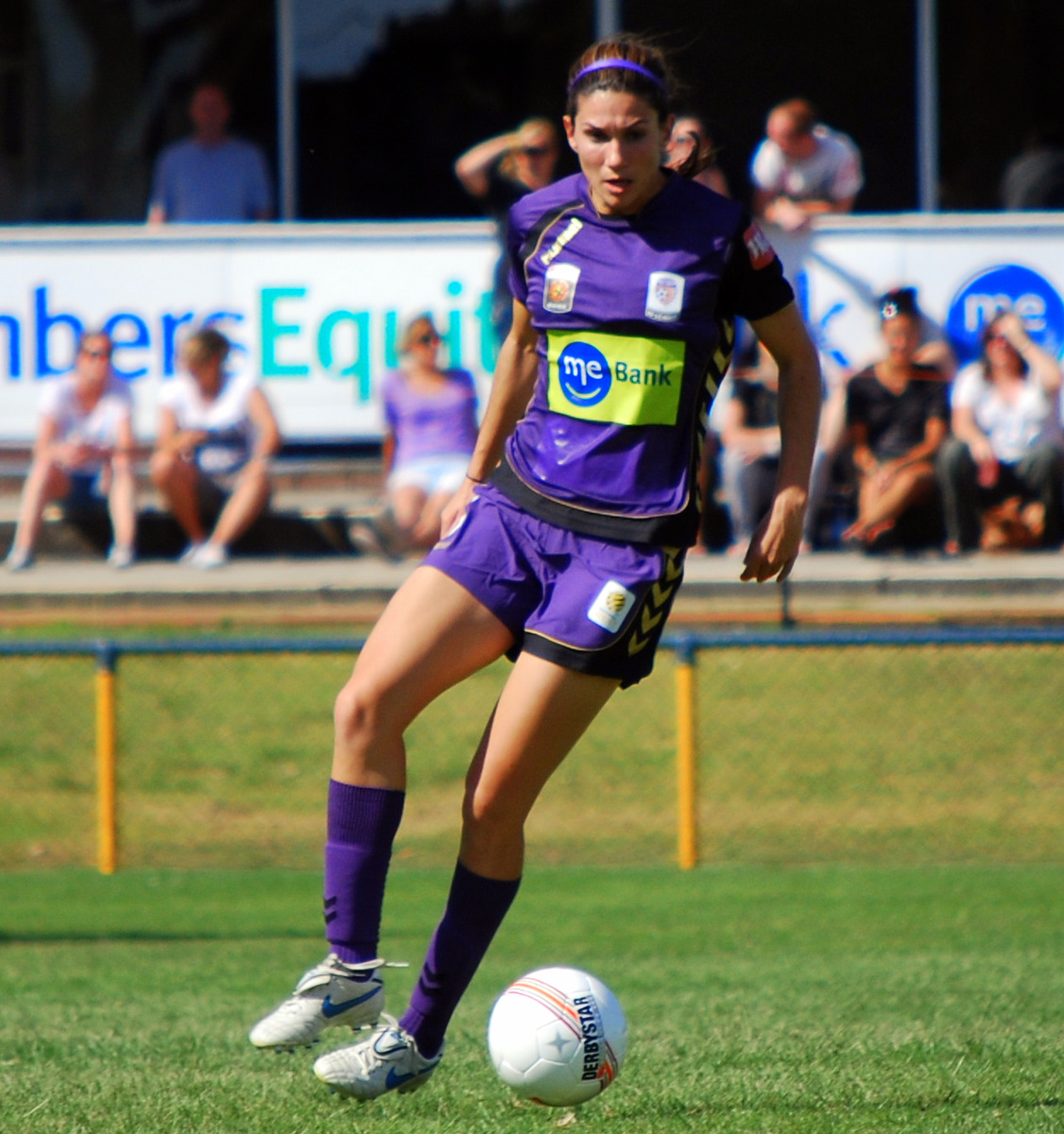
Singer in action for W-League side Perth Glory in 2010.

Singer has played for Washington Freedom in the Women's Professional Soccer before she was waived during the 2010 season. Singer was signed by Perth Glory in Australia's W-League to bolster their defensive stocks and spent the latter part of 2009 playing for the Perth based side.

In 2011, she left Perth Glory for the Swedish team Dalsjöfors GoIF in Damallsvenskan. In January 2012 she transferred to the German club Turbine Potsdam and signed a contract until 2014.

In June 2014, she signed with the Washington Spirit in the NWSL. She was waived by the Spirit on June 17, 2015.

Singer was rostered with Avaldsnes IL of Norway's Toppserien in 2015.

In 2019 Singer was a founding member of Alexandria Soccer Association's Women's semi-pro level futsal team. The team went on to the Mid-Atlantic Regional Futsal Cup that year and in early 2020 competed at the USFF Northeast Regional Championship in Atlantic City.

== Executive career ==
In 2017, Singer joined the sports agency Octagon, where she worked as director of strategic initiatives and talent.

On August 24, 2022, Houston Dash of the National Women's Soccer League hired Singer as its general manager.
