= 2009 USL W-League season =

USL W-League
- Season: 2009
- Champions: Pali Blues (2nd Title)
- Regular Season title: Hudson Valley Quickstrike Lady Blues (1st Title)
- Matches: 237
- Goals: 827 (3.49 per match)
- Best Player: (Sweden) Angelika Johansson Hudson Valley Quickstrike Lady Blues
- Top goalscorer: (Spain) Laura del Río FC Indiana (18 Goals)
- Best goalkeeper: (United States) Michelle Betos Atlanta Silverbacks Women

The 2009 W-League Season was the league's 15th. The regular season began on May 8 with the Hampton Roads Piranhas defeating the Charlotte Lady Eagles 2–1 in Charlotte. The season ended with 10 games on July 19. The playoffs began on July 22 and ended on August 7.

Pali Blues repeated as W-League champions, defeating the Washington Freedom Reserves in come-from-behind fashion 2–1, which was also how they had won their previous title. Iris Mora was named the Playoffs MVP.

FC Indiana's Laura del Río finished with the most points (40) and goals (18), while her teammate Mónica Ocampo led the league in assists (11). Shannon Lynn, also of FC Indiana, led the league in GAA (0.116) and shutouts (10), and only allowed 2 goals the entire regular season.

== Changes from 2008 season ==
=== Name Changes ===
Six teams changed their name in the off-season:

Team name	Metro area	Previous name
(North Carolina) Cary Lady Clarets	Research Triangle area	Carolina RailHawks Women
(Illinois) Chicago Red Eleven	Chicago area	Chicago Gaels
Colorado Force	Fort Collins area	Fort Collins Force
(New Jersey) Hudson Valley Quickstrike Lady Blues	northern New Jersey area	Jersey Sky Blue
(New York (state)) Rochester Ravens	Rochester area	Rochester Rhinos Women
(Washington, D.C.) Washington Freedom Reserves	Washington, D.C. area	Washington Freedom

=== Expansion Teams ===
Two teams were added for the season:

Team name	Metro area	Location	Previous affiliation
(New York (state)) Buffalo Flash	Buffalo area	Buffalo, New York	expansion
Quebec City Amiral SC	Quebec City area	Quebec City, Quebec	expansion

=== Teams Leaving ===
Six teams folded after the 2008 season:

- Bradenton Athletics
- Carolina Dynamo
- Fredericksburg Lady Gunners
- Michigan Hawks
- Vermont Lady Voltage
- West Virginia Illusion

Jersey Sky Blue and Washington Freedom both have expansion teams in Women's Professional Soccer. Washington have chosen to keep their reserve squad in the W-League, while Jersey has sold the rights to their W-League team to New York-based Quickstrike FC, which became Hudson Valley Quickstrike Lady Blues.

== Standings ==
Orange indicates W-League title and bye into W-League semifinals.
Purple indicates division title clinched
Green indicates playoff berth clinched

=== Central Conference ===
==== Great Lakes Division ====
Pos	Team	Pld	W	L	T	GF	GA	GD	Pts
1	Ottawa Fury Women	14	11	1	2	40	9	+31	35
2	Buffalo Flash	14	9	2	3	40	10	+30	30
3	Quebec City Amiral SC	14	9	4	1	29	17	+12	28
4	Toronto Lady Lynx	14	6	4	4	25	17	+8	22
5	Laval Comets	13	7	5	1	21	14	+7	22
6	London Gryphons	14	3	9	2	23	33	−10	11
7	Hamilton Avalanche	14	3	9	2	14	35	−21	11
8	Rochester Ravens	14	0	13	1	5	61	−56	1

==== Midwest Division ====
Pos	Team	Pld	W	L	T	GF	GA	GD	Pts
1	FC Indiana	12	10	0	2	63	2	+61	32
2	Chicago Red Eleven	12	10	1	1	37	6	+31	31
3	Minnesota Lightning	12	7	3	2	37	11	+26	23
4	Cleveland Internationals Women	12	4	6	2	15	28	−13	14
5	Fort Wayne Fever	12	3	7	2	19	40	−21	11
6	Kalamazoo Outrage	12	2	8	2	11	39	−28	8
7	West Michigan Firewomen	11	0	10	1	5	61	−56	1

=== Eastern Conference ===
==== Atlantic Division ====
Pos	Team	Pld	W	L	T	GF	GA	GD	Pts
1	Atlanta Silverbacks Women	12	10	1	1	24	3	+21	31
2	Tampa Bay Hellenic	12	8	1	3	24	7	+17	27
3	Charlotte Lady Eagles	12	6	3	3	19	13	+6	21
4	Hampton Roads Piranhas	12	6	6	0	24	18	+6	18
5	Cary Lady Clarets	12	5	6	1	24	23	+1	16
6	Northern Virginia Majestics	12	1	10	1	3	21	−18	4
7	Richmond Kickers Destiny	12	1	10	1	8	41	−33	4

==== Northeast Division ====
Pos	Team	Pld	W	L	T	GF	GA	GD	Pts
1	Hudson Valley Quickstrike Lady Blues	14	12	0	2	40	9	+31	38
2	Washington Freedom Reserves	14	12	1	1	49	9	+40	37
3	Boston Renegades (Note: The Boston Renegades qualified for the Eastern Conference playoffs but declined to participate, so the Charlotte Lady Eagles joined as the next most qualified team.)	14	7	3	4	35	16	+19	25
4	Long Island Rough Riders	14	6	7	1	28	26	+2	19
5	New Jersey Wildcats	14	6	7	1	17	23	−6	19
6	Connecticut Passion	14	4	8	2	20	33	−13	14
7	New York Magic	15	1	11	3	8	45	−37	6
8	Western Mass Lady Pioneers	14	1	13	0	8	44	−36	0 (Note: Western Mass forfeited a 1–0 victory to New York due to an ineligible player, and was docked an additional three points.)

=== Western Conference ===
Pos	Team	Pld	W	L	T	GF	GA	GD	Pts
1	Pali Blues	12	9	0	3	25	9	+16	30
2	Colorado Force	12	4	2	6	16	13	+3	18
3	Real Colorado Cougars	12	4	5	3	16	15	+1	15
4	Seattle Sounders Women	12	3	3	6	12	15	−3	15
5	Vancouver Whitecaps Women	12	3	4	5	15	19	−4	14
6	Ventura County Fusion	12	2	5	5	13	22	−9	11
7	Los Angeles Legends	12	2	7	3	15	20	−5	9

== Playoffs ==
=== Format ===
The Hudson Valley Quickstrike Lady Blues earned a bye directly to the W-League Semifinals. The Washington Freedom Reserves were moved into the top spot in the Northeast Division, and the Charlotte Lady Eagles received the division's second playoff spot (the Boston Renegades were the original holders of the second spot, but declined to enter).

The Central Conference will have 5 playoff spots. The second and third place teams from the Great Lakes Division will play each other. The winner will play the Midwest Division champions, while the Great Lakes Division champion will play the second place team of the Midwest Division. The winners of those games will play to determine the conference champion. The Eastern Conference division champions will play the second place team of the opposite division, the winners facing off to determine who goes to the W-League Semifinals. The Western Conference will have their top two teams facing off to determine their conference champion.

The W-League Semifinals will put the regular season champion against the lowest seeded conference champion, and the higher-ranked conference champions against each other. The winners of these games will play in the championship, while the losers will play in the Third Place game.

=== Conference Brackets ===
Central Conference

Central Divisional Round
GL2	(New York (state)) Buffalo Flash	5
GL3	Quebec City Amiral SC	0

Central Semifinals
MW1	FC Indiana	3
GL2	(New York (state)) Buffalo Flash	0
GL1	(Ontario) Ottawa Fury Women	4
MW2	(Illinois) Chicago Red Eleven	2

Central Championship
MW1	FC Indiana	1
GL1	(Ontario) Ottawa Fury Women	2

Eastern Conference

Eastern Semifinals
NE1	(Washington, D.C.) Washington Freedom Reserves	2
AT2	(Florida) Tampa Bay Hellenic	1
AT1	(Georgia (U.S. state)) Atlanta Silverbacks Women	1
NE2	(North Carolina) Charlotte Lady Eagles	2

Eastern Championship
NE1	(Washington, D.C.) Washington Freedom Reserves	2
NE2	(North Carolina) Charlotte Lady Eagles	1

Western Conference

Western Finals
W1	(California) Pali Blues	5
W2	Colorado Force	2

=== W-League Championship Bracket ===
Semifinal
NE1	(Washington, D.C.) Washington Freedom Reserves (AET/PSO)	0 (3)
GL1	(Ontario) Ottawa Fury Women	0 (1)
WL	(New York (state)) Hudson Valley Quickstrike Lady Blues	0
W1	(California) Pali Blues	4

Championship
NE1	(Washington, D.C.) Washington Freedom Reserves	1
W1	(California) Pali Blues	2

=== Divisional Round ===
July 22, 2009
7:00 PM EDT

(New York (state)) Buffalo Flash	5–0	Quebec City Arsenal
Ruiz 26'; Sutton 34' 60'; Mosebo (yellow card) 44'; Lasek 79'; Craft 81'	Report

Orchard Park High School Field
Orchard Park, New York
Attendance: 500

=== Conference semifinals ===
July 24, 2009
5:00 PM EDT

(Washington, D.C.) Washington Freedom Reserves	2–1	(Florida) Tampa Bay Hellenic
Tegeler 42'; Lenczyk 67'	(Report)	Gordon 58'

RE/MAX Greater Atlanta Stadium
Atlanta
Attendance: 82
Referee: Patrick Baker (USA)

July 24, 2009
5:00 PM EDT

(Ontario) Ottawa Fury Women	4–2	(Illinois) Chicago Red Eleven
Evans 20'; Hearn 31' 76' 82'		Davison 11'; Cooper 90'

Jefferson High School
Lafayette, Indiana
Referee: (USA)

July 24, 2009
7:30 PM EDT

(Georgia (U.S. state)) Atlanta Silverbacks Women	1–2	(North Carolina) Charlotte Lady Eagles
Hall 76'; Yempuku (yellow card) 84'; Ford (yellow card) 90'	(Report)	Ozimek 85' 88'

RE/MAX Greater Atlanta Stadium
Atlanta
Attendance: 917
Referee: Mark Cleland (USA)

July 24, 2009
7:30 PM EDT

FC Indiana	3–0	(New York (state)) Buffalo Flash
Leyva 13' 45' (PK); Del Rio 26'		Mosebo (yellow card) 45'

Jefferson High School
Lafayette, Indiana
Referee: (USA)

=== Conference finals ===
July 25, 2009
7:30 PM EDT

(Washington, D.C.) Washington Freedom Reserves	2–1	(North Carolina) Charlotte Lady Eagles
Lenczyk 76'; 85'	(Report)	Swinehart 25'; Swift (yellow card) 79'

RE/MAX Greater Atlanta Stadium
Atlanta
Attendance: 114
Referee: Serdar Ertep (USA)

July 25, 2009
7:00 PM PDT

(California) Pali Blues	5–2	Colorado Force
Press 11' 75'; Mora (yellow card) 67' (goal) 90' 90+'; O'Hara 88'	(Report)	Marshall 60' 72'

Stadium by the Sea
Los Angeles
Attendance: 342
Referee: Felisha Mariscal (USA)

July 26, 2009
7:30 PM EDT

FC Indiana	1–2	(Ontario) Ottawa Fury Women
Lyons 11'		Moore 20' (OG); Thomas 76' (OG)

Jefferson High School
Lafayette, Indiana
Referee: (USA)

=== W-League Semifinals ===
July 31, 2009
7:30 PM EDT

(New York (state)) Hudson Valley Quickstrike Lady Blues	0–4	(California) Pali Blues
Gunning (yellow card) 75'	(Report)	Taylor 14'; Mora 45'; O'Hara 50'; Cheney 65' (yellow card) 69'

Newburgh Free Academy Stadium
Newburgh, New York
Attendance: 1,007
Referee: Edwin Cespedas (USA)

August 1, 2009
6:00 EDT

(Washington, D.C.) Washington Freedom Reserves	0 – 0 AET	(Ontario) Ottawa Fury Women
	(Report)	Romagnuolo (yellow card) 32'; Percival (yellow card) 47'; Evans (yellow card) 50'
Penalties
Matute (penalty scored); Toulouse (penalty scored); Miskel (penalty scored)	3–1	(penalty scored) Moorwood; (penalty missed) Percival; (penalty missed) Wetzel; (penalty missed) Evans

Maryland SoccerPlex
Germantown, Maryland
Referee: Dean Fairweather (USA)

=== W-League Championship ===
August 7, 2009
7:30 PM EDT

(Washington, D.C.) Washington Freedom Reserves	1–2	(California) Pali Blues
Matute 14'		Billingsley (yellow card) 14' (goal) 37'; Mora 86'

Maryland SoccerPlex
Germantown, Maryland
Referee: (USA)

== Awards ==
The finalists for W-League MVP, U19 Player of the Year, Coach of the Year, and Defender of the Year were announced on August 3, 2009, with the winners to be announced on August 5. The Goalkeeper of the Year was announced on August 3.

=== Most Valuable Player Finalists ===
- (Sweden) Angelika Johansson, F, Hudson Valley Quickstrike Lady Blues (Winner)
- (Spain) Laura del Río, F, FC Indiana
- (New Zealand) Amber Hearn, F, Ottawa Fury Women

=== U19 Player of the Year Finalists ===
- (Guyana) Chanté Sandiford, G, Washington Freedom Reserves (Winner)
- (United States) Sarah Chapman, M, Tampa Bay Hellenic
- (Albania) Furtuna Velaj, F, Connecticut Passion

=== Defender of the Year Finalists ===
- (United States) Brittany Taylor, Hudson Valley Quickstrike Lady Blues (Winner)
- (United States) Ashleigh Gunning, Hudson Valley Quickstrike Lady Blues
- (New Zealand) Ria Percival, Ottawa Fury Women

=== Goalkeeper of the Year ===
- (United States) Michelle Betos, Atlanta Silverbacks Women

=== Coach of the Year Finalists ===
- (Canada) Fabien Cottin, Quebec City Arsenal (Winner)
- (United States) Tony Anglin, Chicago Red Eleven
- (United States) George Fotopoulos, Tampa Bay Hellenic
- (United States) Jesse Kolmel, Hudson Valley Quickstrike Lady Blues

== All-League and All-Conference teams ==
=== Central Conference ===
F: (Spain) Laura del Río*, IND; (New Zealand) Amber Hearn*, OTT; (United States) Caroline Smith, MIN
M: (England) Gemma Davison*, CHI; (United States) Jennifer Hance, OTT; (Mexico) Fatima Leyva, IND; (United States) Rosa Tantillo*, BUF
D: (United States) Jenny Jeffers, CHI; (New Zealand) Ria Percival*, OTT; (Canada) Clare Rustad, TOR
G: (Scotland) Shannon Lynn, IND
Honorable Mention: (United States) Margaret Allgeier, D, FW; (United States) Haley Ford, D, CLE; (Canada) Christina Julien, F, LAV; (Canada) Melissa Lesage, F, QC; (United States) Heather MacDougall, M, HAM; (United States) Courtney Nash, M, WMi; (United States) Anna Stinson, M, KAL; (Canada) Jenn Wolbert, G, LON; (United States) Casey Zimny, D, ROC

=== Eastern Conference ===
F: (Sweden) Angelika Johansson*, HV; (Canada) Jen Parsons, WAS; (United States) Brittany Tegeler, WAS
M: (United States) Lindsay Ozimek, CHA; (United States) Christina Rife, CHA; (United States) Megan Tomlinson, ATL
D: (United States) Casey Brown, BOS; (United States) Ashleigh Gunning*, HV; (Jamaica) Philisha Lewis, TB; (United States) Brittany Taylor*, HV
G: (United States) Michelle Betos*, ATL
Honorable Mention: (United States) Mary Casey, G, NV; (United States) Brooke DeRosa, M, LI; (Jamaica) Shaneka Gordon, F, HR; (United States) Robyn Jones, G, NJ; (United States) Courtney McMahon, M, NY; (United States) Rachel Richards, M, WMa; (Albania) Furtuna Velaj, F, & (United States) Lindsay Vera, F, CON; (United States) Jennifer Woodie, D, RIC

=== Western Conference ===
F: (Mexico) Iris Mora, PAL; (Canada) Jodi Ann Robinson, VAN
M: (United States) Michelle French*, SEA; (United States) Tobin Heath, PAL; (United States) Nikki Marshall, COL; (Canada) Carmelina Moscato, VAN; (United States) Nikki Washington*, PAL
D: (United States) Jenea Gibbons, LA; (United States) Kelli Smith, SEA; (United States) Leah Tapscott, PAL
G: (United States) Katie Hultin, SEA
Honorable Mention: (England) Kay Hawke, G, VEN, (United States) Taryn Hemmings, M, RC

* denotes All-League selections.

== See also ==
- United Soccer Leagues 2009
- 2009 PDL Season

== Source website ==
USL historical stats
