= 2010 WPS Draft =

The 2010 WPS College Draft took place on January 15, 2010. It was the second college draft held by Women's Professional Soccer to assign the WPS rights of college players to the American-based teams.

== Format ==
Official WPS release

- Atlanta Beat select first, Philadelphia Independence select second
- Existing teams draft 3 – 9 in reverse order of regular season finish in all rounds
- Expansion teams also draft 10th & 11th in first round only

== Round 1 ==
Pick	Player	Pos.	WPS Team	Previous Team
1	Tobin Heath	Md	Atlanta Beat	Pali Blues
2	Lauren Cheney		Boston Breakers	Pali Blues
3	Kelley O'Hara		FC Gold Pride	Pali Blues
4	Whitney Engen		Chicago Red Stars	Pali Blues
5	Nikki Washington		Los Angeles Sol	Pali Blues
6	Brittany Taylor		Sky Blue FC	Hudson Valley Quickstrike Lady Blues
7	Nikki Marshall		Washington Freedom	Colorado Force
8	Casey Nogueira		Los Angeles Sol	Cary Lady Clarets
9	Kiersten Dallstream		Los Angeles Sol	Arizona Rush
10	Ali Riley		FC Gold Pride	Pali Blues
11	Alyssa Naeher		Boston Breakers	SoccerPlus Connecticut

== Round 2 ==
Pick	Player	Pos.	WPS Team	Previous Team
12	Becky Edwards		FC Gold Pride	Washington Freedom Reserves
13	Malorie Rutledge		Philadelphia Independence	LSU Tigers
14	Michelle Enyeart		Los Angeles Sol	Portland Pilots
15	Jessica McDonald		Chicago Red Stars	
16	Jordan Angeli		Boston Breakers	Santa Clara Broncos
17	Kristina Larsen		Saint Louis Athletica	UCLA Bruins
18	Carly Dobratz		Washington Freedom	Arizona Rush
19	Ashlyn Harris		Saint Louis Athletica	Pali Blues
20	Kaley Fountain		FC Gold Pride	Wake Forest Demon Deacons

== Round 3 ==
Pick	Player	Pos.	WPS Team	Previous Team
21	Blakely Mattern		Atlanta Beat	Charlotte Lady Eagles
22	Kiki Bosio		Los Angeles Sol	Ajax America Women
23	Shameka Gordon		Atlanta Beat	Tampa Bay Hellenic
24	Kelsey Davis		Chicago Red Stars	Portland Pilots
25	Estelle Johnson		Los Angeles Sol	Colorado Force
26	Katie Schoepfer		Sky Blue FC	Washington Freedom Reserves
27	Beverly Goebel		Washington Freedom	Miami Hurricanes
28	Amanda Poach		Saint Louis Athletica	Santa Clara Broncos
29	Melissa Clarke		Sky Blue FC	

== Round 4 ==
Pick	Player	Pos.	WPS Team	Previous Team
30	Jill Hutchinson		Atlanta Beat	Wake Forest Demon Deacons
31	Kelly Henderson		Philadelphia Independence	Boston College Eagles
32	Erin Guthrie		FC Gold Pride	Rutgers Scarlet Knights
33	Michele Weissenhofer		Chicago Red Stars	Notre Dame Fighting Irish
34	Katherine Reynolds		Boston Breakers	Seattle Sounders Women
35	Danielle Johnson		Sky Blue FC	Ottawa Fury Women
36	Kristi Eveland		Washington Freedom	University of North Carolina Tar Heels
37	Verónica Pérez		Saint Louis Athletica	Seattle Sounders Women
38	Mary Casey		Los Angeles Sol	Northern Virginia Majestics

== Round 5 ==
Pick	Player	Pos.	WPS Team	Previous Team
39	Mallori Loften-Malachi		Atlanta Beat	Tampa Bay Hellenic
40	Carrie Patterson		Philadelphia Independence	Atlanta Silverbacks Women
41	Ashley Bowyer		FC Gold Pride	Ohio State Buckeyes
42	Sophie Reiser		Chicago Red Stars	Hudson Valley Quickstrike Lady Blues
43	Cynthia Morote-Ariza		Boston Breakers	Loyola Ramblers
44	Meagan Snell		Sky Blue FC	Santa Clara Broncos
45	Lauren Robertson		Washington Freedom	Ohio State Buckeyes
46	Carolyn Blank		Saint Louis Athletica	West Virginia Mountaineers
47	Lindsay Browne		Los Angeles Sol	Clemson Tigers

== Round 6 ==
Pick	Player	Pos.	WPS Team	Previous Team
48	Kasey Langdon		Atlanta Beat	Oklahoma State Cowboys
49	Jenifer Anzivino		Philadelphia Independence	Rutgers Scarlet Knights
50	Elizabeth Harkin		FC Gold Pride	Arizona Rush
51	Fiona O'Sullivan		Chicago Red Stars	San Francisco Dons
52	Carly Peetz		Boston Breakers	Colorado Force
53	Kelly Isleib		Sky Blue FC	Utah Utes
54	Mara Osher		Washington Freedom	Washington Freedom Reserves
55	Sarah Teegarden		Saint Louis Athletica	UW–Milwaukee Panthers
56	Gina DiMartino		Boston Breakers	Long Island Rough Riders

== Round 7 ==
Pick	Player	Pos.	WPS Team	Previous Team
57	Shaneka Gordon		Atlanta Beat	Hampton Roads Piranhas
58	Caitlin Farrell		Philadelphia Independence	Wake Forest Demon Deacons
59	Lauren Wilmoth		FC Gold Pride	UCLA Bruins
60	Jackie Santacaterina		Chicago Red Stars	Boston Renegades
61	Casey Brown		Boston Breakers	Boston Renegades
62	Danielle Collins		Philadelphia Independence	William & Mary Tribe
63	Caitlin Miskel		Washington Freedom	Washington Freedom Reserves
64	Elisabeth Redmond		Saint Louis Athletica	Duke Blue Devils
65	Taryn Hemmings		Boston Breakers	Real Colorado Cougars

== Draft notes ==
WPS transactions pages '09'10
