= 2010 Atlanta Beat season =

Atlanta Beat
2010 season
- Owner: Fitz Johnson
- Head coach: Gareth O'Sullivan, James Galanis
- Stadium: KSU Soccer Stadium
- WPS: 7th
- Playoffs: Did not qualify
- Top goalscorer: League: Eniola Aluko (6); All: Eniola Aluko (6)
- Highest home attendance: 7,248 (May 9 vs. NJ)
- Lowest home attendance: 2,267 (Sept. 1 vs. BOS)
- Average home league attendance: 3,690
- Biggest win: 1 goal (5 matches)
- Biggest defeat: 1–6 (Aug. 28 vs. BAY)
Home colors	Away colors
- All statistics correct as of July 15, 2022.

The 2010 Atlanta Beat season was the club's inaugural season in Women's Professional Soccer, joining the Philadelphia Independence as expansion teams in the league's second season, and was their first season in the top division of women's soccer in the American soccer pyramid. Including the WUSA franchise, this was the club's fifth year of existence.

== Review and events ==
The WPS Beat, with few connections to its WUSA predecessor, was announced on June 18, 2009, as an expansion franchise. It began play at the newly built Kennesaw State University Soccer Stadium, a $16.5 million, 8,300-seat facility that had been built in partnership between the university and the Beat. Their owner, Fitz Johnson, was an attorney and former defense contractor. The Beat's first signings were through the 2009 WPS International Draft, selecting Ramona Bachmann, Johanna Rasmussen, and Mami Yamaguchi. The team also selected Tobin Heath with the first-overall pick in the 2010 WPS College Draft; however, she injured her ankle three matches into the season and did not appear for the Beat again.

On June 4, 2010, after the Saint Louis Athletica folded in the middle of the season, the Beat added Lori Chalupny, Hope Solo, Eniola Aluko (who would lead the team in goals scored on the season), and Tina Ellertson. Its absorption of so many players from Athletica led to women's soccer bloggers to refer to nickname the team "Atlantica".

After a 4-10-5 start, including an eight-match winless streak to start the season, the Beat fired head coach Gareth O'Sullivan and assistant coach Robbie Nicholson. James Galanis was hired to take over as coach; under him, the Beat finished 1-3-1. The Beat conceded the league's most goals in the season (40) and were tied with Sky Blue FC for the fewest scored (20).

== Match results ==
=== Preseason ===
3 April 2010	Saint Louis Athletica	1–2	Atlanta Beat	Tulsa, Oklahoma
	Boxx	Report	McNeil; Bachmann

=== WPS ===
11 April 2010 1	Philadelphia Independence	0–0	Atlanta Beat	Philadelphia
		Report	McNeill (yellow card) 90+'	Stadium: John A. Farrell Stadium; Attendance: 6,028; Referee: Daniel Fitzgerald; Assistant referees: Melanie Johnson, Ian O'Neil; Fourth official: Zachary Rubinch

18 April 2010 2	Washington Freedom	3–1	Atlanta Beat	Boyds, Maryland
	Wambach 43'; Sawa 50' (Wambach); Welsh 89' (Wambach)	Report	Bachmann (yellow card) 44', (goal) 47' (Yamaguchi)	Stadium: Maryland SoccerPlex; Attendance: 2,665; Referee: Donald Dellavia; Assistant referees: Dean Fairweather, Mark Gorak; Fourth official: Kia Goodrich

24 April 2010 3	FC Gold Pride	2–1	Atlanta Beat	Castro Valley, California
	Milbrett 10' (Abily); Buehler (yellow card) 26'; Dew 89' (Riley)	Report	Ocampo 24' (Kerr); Zerboni (yellow card) 45+'	Stadium: Castro Valley Athletic Stadium; Attendance: 3,002; Referee: Dallas Malhiwsky; Assistant referees: Verónica Pérez, Mike Kampmeinert; Fourth official: Vicente Cortes

1 May 2010 4	Philadelphia Independence	1–0	Atlanta Beat	Philadelphia
	Lindsey 25' (Falk)	Report		Stadium: John A. Farrell Stadium; Attendance: 2,760; Referee: Michelle Cowman; Assistant referees: Marlene Duffy, Melanie Johnson; Fourth official: John McCloskey

9 May 2010 5	Atlanta Beat	1–0	Sky Blue FC	Kennesaw, GA
		Report	Robinson 50' (o.g.)	Stadium: KSU Soccer Stadium; Attendance: 7,248; Referee: Moo Hackett; Assistant referees: Melanie Johnson, Patrick Baker; Fourth official: Tony Russo

16 May 2010 6	Atlanta Beat	0–2	Washington Freedom	Kennesaw, GA
7:00 p.m. EST (UTC−05:00)		Report	Mykland 28' (Wambach); Wambach 63' (Bompastor); Goebel (yellow card) 86'	Stadium: KSU Soccer Stadium; Attendance: 3,112; Referee: Daniel Radford; Assistant referees: Marlene Duffy, Amy Mahan; Fourth official: Chris Shanku

29 May 2010 –	Atlanta Beat	v	Saint Louis Athletica	Kennesaw, GA
7:00 p.m. EST (UTC−05:00)				Stadium: KSU Soccer Stadium
Note: Saint Louis Athletica dissolved on May 27, 2010.

6 June 2010 7	Chicago Red Stars	0–0	Atlanta Beat	Bridgeview, Illinois
3:08 p.m. CST (UTC−06:00)	Weber (yellow card) 90+1'	Report		Stadium: Toyota Park; Attendance: 4,227; Referee: Daniel Fitzgerald; Assistant referees: Shelley Finger, Ann Mayberry; Fourth official: Stephanie Toth

19 June 2010 8	Atlanta Beat	1–0	Chicago Red Stars	Kennesaw, GA
	Ellertson 41' (Ocampo)	Report		Stadium: KSU Soccer Stadium; Attendance: 3,589
Note: Match highlights

23 June 2010 9	Atlanta Beat	2–2	Philadelphia Independence	Kennesaw, GA
7:30 p.m. EST (UTC−05:00)	Yamaguchi 15' (Zerboni); Ellertson 90+' (Miyama)	Report	Rodriguez 36' (Adams); Bishop 49' (o.g.)	Stadium: KSU Soccer Stadium; Attendance: 2,632; Referee: Ted Unkel; Assistant referees: Tony Russo, Amy Mahan; Fourth official: Chris Shanku

3 July 2010 10	Atlanta Beat	0–4	FC Gold Pride	Kennesaw, GA
	McNeill (yellow card) 34' (red card)	Report	Sinclair 1' (Marta); Marta 30', 86' (Barnhart); O'Hara 90' (Sinclair)	Stadium: KSU Soccer Stadium; Attendance: 3,111; Referee: Kari Seitz; Assistant referees: Ashley Cedro, Patrick Baker; Fourth official: Mark Cleland

7 July 2010 11	Chicago Red Stars	1–1	Atlanta Beat	Bridgeview, Illinois
	Masar 42' (Cristiane); Chapman (yellow card) 61'	Report	Rasmussen 30'; Miyama (yellow card) 31'; Cinalli (yellow card) 90+'	Stadium: Toyota Park; Attendance: 3,091; Referee: Daniel Fitzgerald; Assistant referees: Vicente Cortes, Miguel Panduro; Fourth official: Stephanie Toth

11 July 2010 12	Boston Breakers	3–1	Atlanta Beat	Boston, Massachusetts
	Angeli 49'; Smith 53'; Bogus 54' (Angeli); Scott (yellow card) 90+'	Report	Rasmussen 7'	Stadium: Harvard Stadium; Attendance: 4,194; Referee: Donald Dellavia; Assistant referees: Miguel Panduro, Mark Allatin; Fourth official: Michael Solla

18 July 2010 13	Sky Blue FC	0–1	Atlanta Beat	Piscataway, New Jersey
		Report	Aluko 7' (Kerr); Sesselmann (yellow card) 85'	Stadium: Yurcak Field; Attendance: 2,808; Referee: Margaret Domka

21 July 2010 14	Atlanta Beat	1–0	Chicago Red Stars	Kennesaw, GA
	Aluko 56' (Bishop), (yellow card) 90+'; Blank (yellow card) 79'	Report		Stadium: KSU Soccer Stadium; Attendance: 3,214; Referee: Michael Donovan; Assistant referees: Matthew Kreitzer, Mark Cleland; Fourth official: Amy Mahan

28 July 2010 15	Atlanta Beat	3–2	Washington Freedom	Kennesaw, GA
	Rasmussen 20' (Miyama); Ellertson (yellow card) 44'; Ocampo 67' (Zerboni), 88' (Miyama)	Report	Marshall 41' (Sawa); Huffman 67' (Wambach)	Stadium: KSU Soccer Stadium; Attendance: 3,339; Referee: Michelle Cowman; Assistant referees: Amy Willing, Amy Mahan; Fourth official: Patrick Baker

1 August 2010 16	Atlanta Beat	0–0	FC Gold Pride	Kennesaw, GA
	Chalupny (yellow card) 9'; Bachmann (yellow card) 41'	Report	Chapman (yellow card) 89'	Stadium: KSU Soccer Stadium; Attendance: 3,242; Referee: Margaret Domka; Assistant referees: Said Ravanfar, J.J. Blodgett; Fourth official: Mark Cleland

4 August 2010 17	Boston Breakers	2–0	Atlanta Beat	Kennesaw, GA
	Smith 1' (Tarpley), 62', (yellow card) 66'	Report		Stadium: KSU Soccer Stadium; Attendance: 3,251; Referee: Bryan Roslund; Assistant referees: Moo Hackett, Russell Wolf; Fourth official: Jan Halaska

7 August 2010 18	Atlanta Beat	1–2	Sky Blue FC	Kennesaw, GA
	Aluko 62'	Report	Averbuch (yellow card) 36'; Kalmari 44'; Ellertson 71' (o.g.); Rosana (yellow card) 79'; Schnur (yellow card) 90+'	Stadium: KSU Soccer Stadium; Attendance: 3,489; Referee: Michael Donovan; Assistant referees: Juan Guzman, Mark Cleland

15 August 2010 19	Philadelphia Independence	3–2	Atlanta Beat	Philadelphia, Pennsylvania
	Magnúsdóttir (yellow card) 32'; DiMartino 42', 60' (Rodriguez); Lohman 81' (Rodriguez)	Report	Rasmussen 4' (Bachmann); Chalupny 18' (Robinson)	Stadium: John A. Farrell Stadium; Attendance: 2,559; Referee: Daniel Fitzgerald; Assistant referees: Verónica Pérez, Stanford Nagle III; Fourth official: Eric Weisbrod

21 August 2010 20	Boston Breakers	2–3	Atlanta Beat	New Britain, Connecticut
	Tarpley 87'; Lilly 90+'	Report	Chalupny 11'; Miyama 66'; Aluko 73' (Kerr)	Stadium: Veterans Stadium; Attendance: 4,071; Referee: Ted Unkel; Assistant referees: Kristen Schiereck, Russell Wolf; Fourth official: Daniel Hristov

28 August 2010 21	Atlanta Beat	1–6	FC Gold Pride	Kennesaw, GA
	Miyama (yellow card) 52'; Kerr 65'	Report	Dew (yellow card) 16'; Milbrett 43' (Boxx); Abily 51'; Marta 66' (Abily), 70' (Sinclair); O'Hara 72'; Boxx (yellow card) 78'; Sinclair 88' (Abily)	Stadium: KSU Soccer Stadium; Attendance: 4,289; Referee: Jennifer Bennett; Assistant referees: Tony Russo, Chris Heintzman; Fourth official: Chris Shanku

1 September 2010 22	Atlanta Beat	1–3	Boston Breakers	Kennesaw, GA
	Aluko 64' (Miyama); McNeill (yellow card) 65'	Report	Tarpley 22' (Smith); Angeli 33' (LePeilbet); Lilly 45+' (Scott)	Stadium: KSU Soccer Stadium; Attendance: 2,267; Referee: Daniel Radford; Assistant referees: John Schmitz, Brandon Adams; Fourth official: Amy Mahan

5 September 2010 23	Atlanta Beat	0–0	Sky Blue FC	Kennesaw, GA
		Report	Lloyd (yellow card) 88'	Stadium: KSU Soccer Stadium; Attendance: 4,752; Referee: Allan Chapman; Assistant referees: Melanie Johnson, Mark Cleland; Fourth official: Justin Nelson

11 September 2010 24	Washington Freedom	1–0	Atlanta Beat	Boyds, Maryland
	Wambach (yellow card) 52', (goal) 88' (Sauerbrunn)	Report	Sesselmann (yellow card) 15' (yellow-red card) 76'; Miyama (yellow card) 90+'	Stadium: Maryland SoccerPlex; Attendance: 3,545; Referee: Kari Seitz; Assistant referees: Verónica Pérez, Marlene Duffy; Fourth official: Michael Donovan

== Club ==
=== Roster ===
As of September 5, 2010

Note: Flags indicate national team as defined under FIFA eligibility rules; some limited exceptions apply. Players may hold more than one non-FIFA nationality.

No.	Pos.	Nation	Player
0	GK	USA	Mallori Lofton-Malachi
2	MF	USA	McCall Zerboni
4	MF	USA	Stacy Bishop
6	DF	USA	Kia McNeill
7	DF	USA	Leigh Ann Robinson
8	FW	MEX	Mónica Ocampo
9	MF	JPN	Mami Yamaguchi
10	FW	SUI	Ramona Bachmann
11	MF	USA	Angie Kerr
12	MF	USA	Lori Chalupny
13	FW	DEN	Johanna Rasmussen

No.	Pos.	Nation	Player
14	MF	USA	Carolyn Blank
15	FW	USA	Amanda Cinalli
16	DF	USA	Kaley Fountain
17	GK	USA	Brett Maron
18	MF	JPN	Aya Miyama
19	MF	ENG	Rebecca Nolin
21	FW	ENG	Eniola Aluko
23	DF	USA	Tina Ellertson
24	FW	USA	Lauren Sesselmann
78	GK	USA	Hope Solo
—	MF	USA	Manya Makoski

=== Management and staff ===
Front Office

Position	Staff
Owner & Chief Executive Officer	(United States) T. Fitz Johnson
General Manager	(United States) Shawn McGee
Player and Community Relations Director	(United States) Jen Plante
Sales and Marketing Director	(United States) Chris Sperry
Corporate Partnerships Manager	(United States) Sherry King-Castellanos
Media Relations Manager	(United States) Christa Mann
Crowd Building Director	(United States) Scott Foster
Operations Director	(United States) Kristin Lettiere
Benefits Coordinator	(United States) Jan Williams
Administrative Assistant	(United States) Maria Pacheco

Last updated: August 10, 2010
Source: Atlanta Beat

Coaching Staff

Position	Staff
Interim Head Coach	(Australia) James Galanis
Asst. Coach/GK Coach	(United States) Russ Stroud

Last updated: September 10, 2010
Source: Atlanta Beat

== Standings ==
Pos	Team	Pld	W	D	L	GF	GA	GD	Pts	Qualification
4	Washington Freedom	24	8	7	9	33	33	0	31	Advance to First Round
5	Sky Blue FC	24	7	7	10	20	31	−11	28	
6	Chicago Red Stars	24	7	6	11	21	27	−6	27	
7	Atlanta Beat	24	5	6	13	20	40	−20	21	
8	Saint Louis Athletica	6	2	3	1	9	8	+1	9	Team withdrawn

Source: WPS Soccerway
Rules for classification: 1) points, 2) goal difference, 3) head-to-head result.

== Awards ==
=== WPS Player of the Week ===
Week	Player	Week's Statline
16	(United States) Allison Lipsher	11 saves in two matches
19	(England) Eniola Aluko	Game-winning goal vs. Boston

== See also ==
- 2010 in American soccer
- Atlanta Beat
