= Becky Edwards (soccer) =

American soccer player

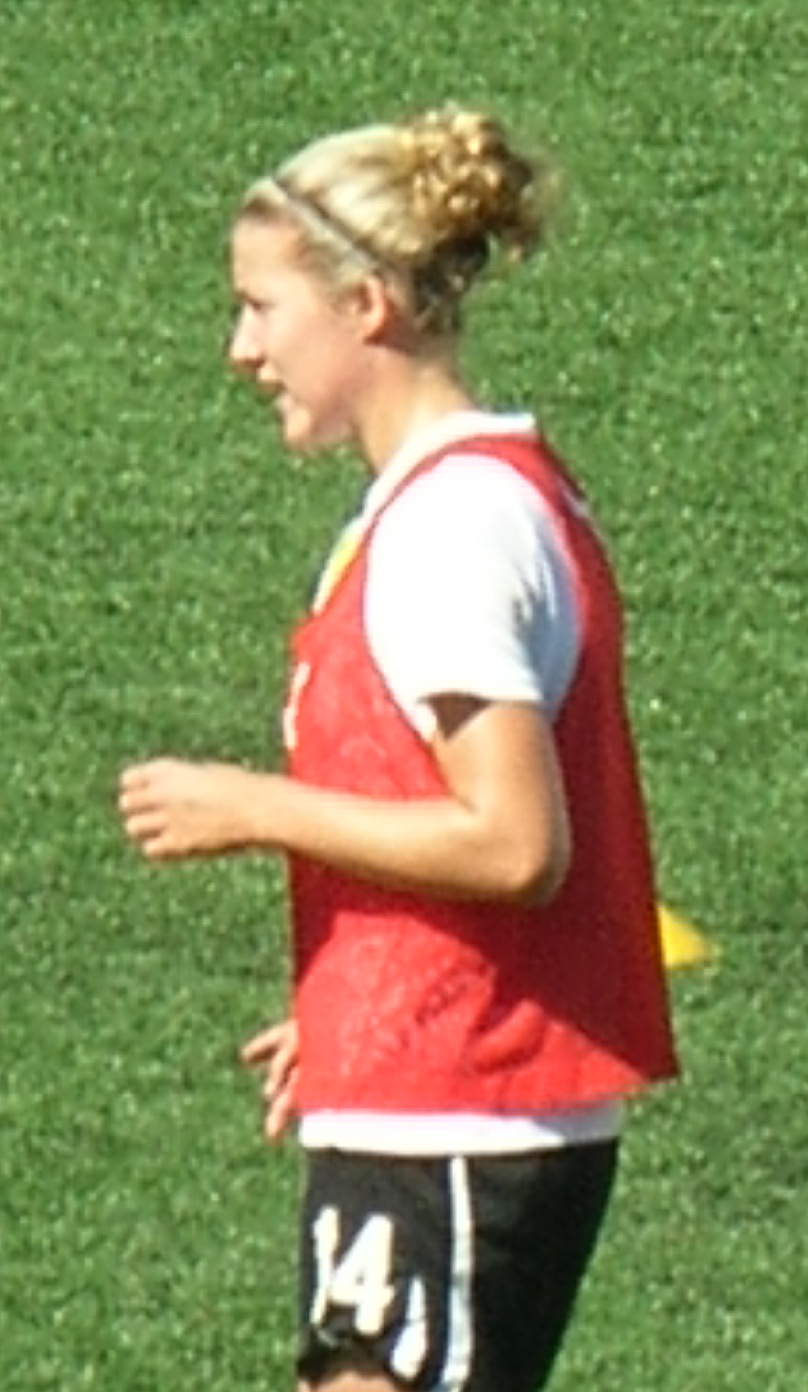

Personal information
- Full name: Rebecca Lynn Edwards
- Date of birth: May 22, 1988 (age 38)
- Place of birth: Downingtown, Pennsylvania, United States
- Height: 5 ft 8 in (1.73 m)
- Positions: Midfielder; defender

Youth career
- West Chester Predators

College career
| Years | Team | Apps | (Gls) |
| 2006–2009 | Florida State Seminoles | 95 | (10) |

Senior career*
| Years | Team | Apps | (Gls) |
| 2006 | New Jersey Wildcats | | |
| 2007 | Jersey Sky Blue | | |
| 2008 | SoccerPlus Connecticut | | |
| 2009 | Washington Freedom Reserves | | |
| 2010 | FC Gold Pride | 25 | (1) |
| 2011 | Western New York Flash | 19 | (3) |
| 2011 | Hammarby | 7 | (0) |
| 2012 | Kristianstads DFF | 18 | (2) |
| 2013 | Portland Thorns FC | 10 | (0) |
| 2014 | Houston Dash | 23 | (1) |
| 2014 | Kristianstads DFF | 8 | (2) |
| 2015 | Western New York Flash | 20 | (2) |
| 2016 | Orlando Pride | 16 | (0) |
| 2017–2018 | Kristianstads DFF | 42 | (1) |

International career
| 2005 | United States U-17 | | |
| 2007–2008 | United States U-20 | 22 | |
| 2011 | United States U-23 | | |

Managerial career
- 2019–2021: Florida State Seminoles (grad. assistant)
- 2021–2022: Penn Quakers (assistant)
- 2022–: Tennessee Volunteers (assistant)
- 2022: United States U-20 (assistant)
Medal record
Representing United States
Women's Football
Pan American Games
| Silver medal – second place | 2007 Rio de Janeiro | Team competition |
- * Club domestic league appearances and goals

Rebecca Lynn Edwards (born May 22, 1988) is an former American soccer player who played for Swedish club Kristianstads DFF in the Damallsvenskan. She previously played for Orlando Pride, Houston Dash, Portland Thorns, and Western New York Flash in the National Women's Soccer League (NWSL) as well as FC Gold Pride and the championship-winning Western New York Flash in Women's Professional Soccer (WPS).

== Early life ==
Raised in Downingtown, Pennsylvania, she attended Downingtown West High School and led the soccer team to the state championship in 2004 (the first state title in the school's history). During the championship match, she scored the game-winning goal less than 20 seconds into the match. Twice named most valuable player at the school, Edwards was named NSCAA Youth All-American in 2006 and was an All-Star selection by Southeastern Pennsylvania Coaches in 2002, 2003 and 2004. In 2006, she was named one of the top 25 college recruits by Soccer Buzz.

Edwards played club soccer for the West Chester Predators and played for the USYSA regional semifinalist team in 2005 and 2006 as well as the EPYSA State Championship team in 2004, 2005 and 2006. She played for the regional Olympic Development Program (ODP) from 2001 to 2005. In 2006, she was a USL W-League Eastern Conference finalist with the New Jersey Wildcats. She played for SoccerPlus Connecticut in the Women's Premier Soccer League (WPSL) in 2008 and the Washington Freedom in the W-League in 2009.

Edwards was twice-named the most valuable player on the school's basketball team and was the leading scorer during her junior and senior years.

=== Florida State Seminoles, 2006–2009 ===
Edwards played collegiately for the Florida State Seminoles. Among her teammates at FSU were Australian international Selin Kuralay and Japanese international Mami Yamaguchi.

== Club career ==
=== WPS Years: 2010–2011 ===
Edwards was selected as the 12th overall pick in the 2010 WPS Draft by FC Gold Pride. During her time with the FC Gold Pride she made 25 appearances (21 starts) as a rookie, helping to lead the team to a WPS Championship. Played with Thorns FC teammates Christine Sinclair and Rachel Buehler with FC Gold Pride.

After joining the Western New York Flash for the 2011 WPS season, Edwards played in 19 matches and scored 3 goals, helped the team to the 2011 WPS Championship.

=== Kristianstads DFF, 2012 ===
In 2012 Edwards played for Swedish team Kristianstads DFF where she recorded two goals in 18 matches and 17 starts, helping the team to the quarterfinal of the Swedish Cup.

=== Portland Thorns FC, 2013 ===
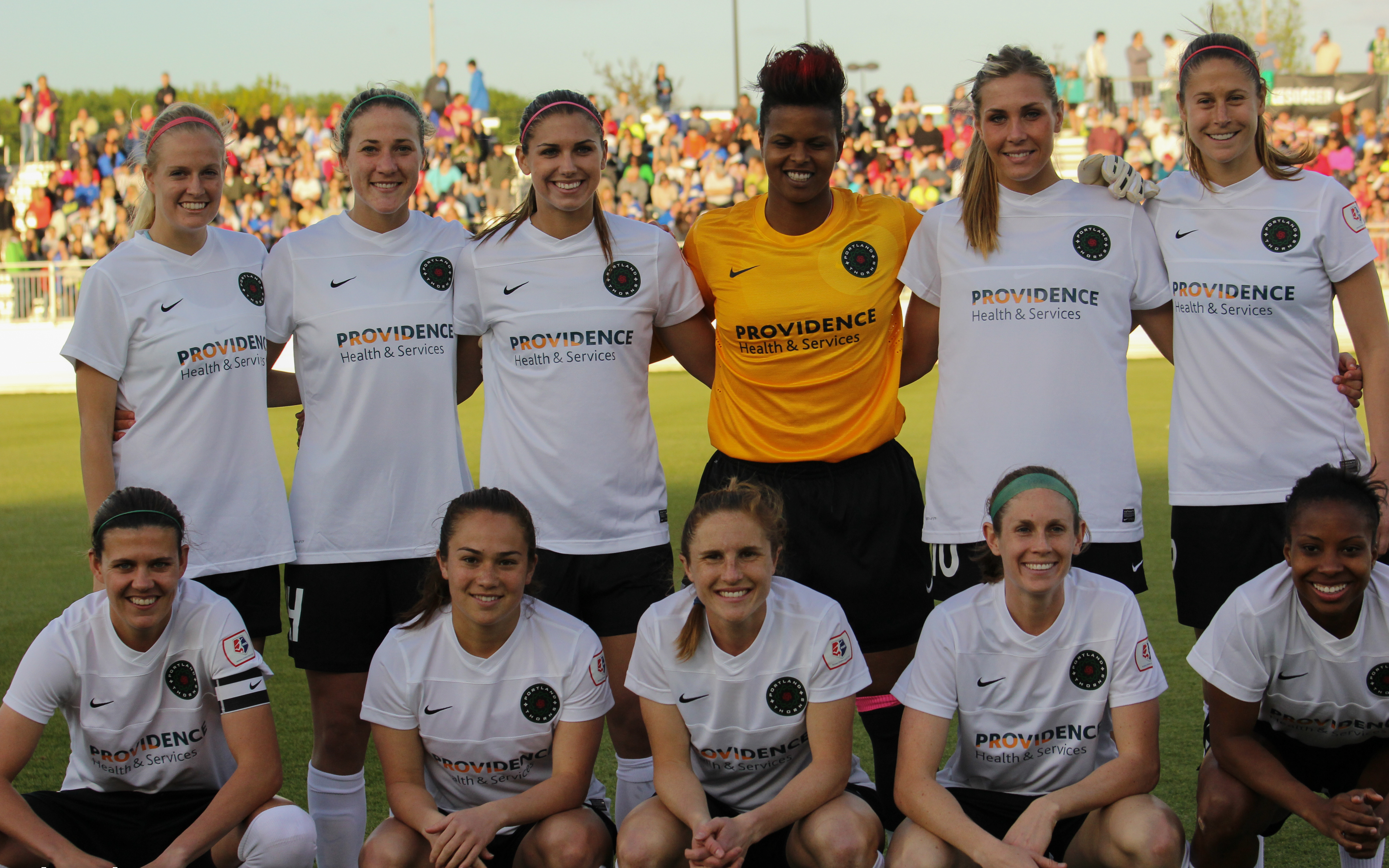
Edwards, top (second from left) in the starting lineup for the Portland Thorns, 2013

Edwards was signed as a free agent with the Portland Thorns ahead of the inaugural season of the NWSL.

=== Houston Dash, 2014 ===
On January 10, 2014, it was announced that Edwards had been selected by the Houston Dash with the eighth pick in the 2014 NWSL Expansion Draft.

=== Western New York Flash, 2015 ===
On October 16, 2014, Edwards was traded to the Western New York Flash in exchange for Carli Lloyd, along with Whitney Engen and a third-round pick in the 2016 NWSL Draft.

=== Orlando Pride, 2016 ===
On September 22, 2016, Edwards announced her retirement from professional soccer.

=== Kristianstads DFF, 2017–2018 ===
In 2017, Edwards came out of retirement to sign with Kristianstads DFF.

== International career ==
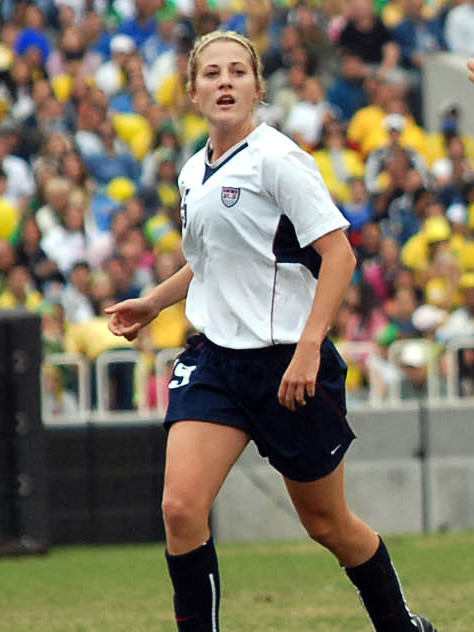
Edwards at the 2007 Pan American Games

Edwards has extensive experience at the youth level for the United States. Edwards captained the team that won the 2008 FIFA U-20 Women's World Cup, playing alongside future Portland Thorns teammates Alex Morgan, Nikki Marshall, and Nikki Washington. In 2011, she played for the United States women's national under-23 soccer team helping the team win the championship at the Four Nations Tournament in La Manga, Spain. Edwards was called into her first full United States women's national soccer team training camp in 2011.

== Coaching career ==
In 2019, Edwards began working as a graduate assistant coach for her alma mater, the Florida State Seminoles. In February 2021, she joined the Penn Quakers as an assistant coach. In June 2022, she then joined as an assistant for the Tennessee Volunteers. She was also appointed an assistant coach for the U.S. under-20 national team at the 2022 FIFA U-20 Women's World Cup.

== Personal life ==
Edwards was previously in a relationship with professional golfer Brooks Koepka.
