= Stacy Bishop =

American college soccer player, professional soccer player, midfielder

Personal information
- Full name: Stacy Leigh Bishop
- Date of birth: May 1, 1985 (age 41)
- Place of birth: Land o' Lakes, Florida, United States
- Height: 5 ft 8 in (1.73 m)
- Position: Midfielder

College career
Years	Team	Apps	(Gls)
2003–2004	LSU Tigers		
2005–2007	Florida Gators		

Senior career*
Years	Team	Apps	(Gls)
2005–2006	Central Florida Krush	27	(9)
2007	Jersey Sky Blue	13	(5)
2008	Tampa Bay Hellenic	14	(6)
2009	Boston Breakers	9	(0)
2009	Tampa Bay Hellenic	5	(3)
2009	Boston Breakers	1	(0)
2010	Atlanta Beat	24	(0)
- * Club domestic league appearances and goals as of 00:38, 25 October 2009 (UTC) ‡ National team caps and goals as of 00:38, 25 October 2009 (UTC)

Stacy Leigh Bishop (born May 1, 1985) is an American former college and professional soccer midfielder who last played for Atlanta Beat of Women's Professional Soccer.

== Early years ==
Bishop was born in Katy, Texas. She grew up in Land o' Lakes, Florida, and attended Land o' Lakes High School. She played for the Land o' Lakes Gators high school soccer team, and received Class 2A first-team all-state honors in 2001, 2002 and 2003. She led her team to the Class 2A state championship in 2003, and was named the Class 2A state player of the year. Bishop holds the Pasco County career scoring record with 192 goals.

== College career ==
Bishop accepted an athletic scholarship to attend Louisiana State University in Baton Rouge, Louisiana, where she played for the LSU Lady Tigers soccer team in 2003 and 2004. After her sophomore year, she transferred to the University of Florida in Gainesville, Florida and had to sit out the 2005 season due to transfer rules. She played for coach Becky Burleigh's Florida Gators women's soccer team in 2006 and 2007. Bishop was recognized as a first-team All-American and a Mac Hermann semi-finalist (top player in the country) in 2006. In both 2006 and 2007, she was an Academic All-American and a first-team All-Southeastern Conference (SEC) selection. Bishop graduated from the University of Florida with a bachelor's degree in health education in December 2007.

== Club career ==
Bishop played for the Central Florida Krush, a W-League franchise based in Winter Park, Florida in 2005–2006. The W-League allows college players the opportunity to play alongside established international players while maintaining their collegiate eligibility. In 2007, Bishop played for the W-League Jersey Sky Blue and in 2008 she played for the W-League Tampa Bay Hellenic.

In 2009, Bishop signed with the Boston Breakers, but was released on June 18, 2009, after making nine appearances for them. She then played for five games for Tampa Bay Hellenic of the W-League before being re-signed by Boston Breakers on July 17, 2009, and made one further appearance (34 minutes) for the club on July 19, 2009, against FC Gold Pride. At the conclusion of the 2009 Women's Professional Soccer season, she was released by the team. Bishop was signed by the Atlanta Beat for the 2010 WPS season. She appeared in every game for the Beat in 2010 and was top 5 in minutes played.
