= 2009 W-League =

2009 W-League may refer to:

- 2009 W-League (Australia), a season of the Australian national women's football (soccer) competition
- 2009 USL W-League season, a season of the North American women's football (soccer) competition
