= Connecticut Passion =

American women's soccer team

- Full name: Connecticut Passion
- Nickname: Passion
- Founded: 2007
- Dissolved: 2009
- Stadium: Sage Park
- Chairman: (United States) Steve Coxon
- Manager: (United States) Dave Clarke
- League: USL W-League
- 2008: 5th, Northeast Division
Home colours	Away colours

Connecticut Passion was an American women's soccer team, founded in 2007. The team was a member of the United Soccer Leagues W-League, the second tier of women's soccer in the United States and Canada. The team plays in the Northeast Division of the Eastern Conference. The team folded after the 2009 season.

The team played its home games at Sage Park in the town of Berlin, Connecticut. The team's colors was sky blue, black and gold.

== Players ==
=== Squad 2015 ===
Note: Flags indicate national team as defined under FIFA eligibility rules; some limited exceptions apply. Players may hold more than one non-FIFA nationality.

No.	Pos.	Nation	Player
0	GK	USA	Kelly Boudreau
1	GK	USA	Jacqueline Weiss
2	DF	USA	Chloe McKay
3	MF	USA	Katherine Macaulay
4	MF	USA	Torrey Leroy
5	MF	USA	Courtney McMahon
6	MF	USA	Megan Ashworth
7	MF	USA	Lauren Erwin
8	MF	USA	Rachel Schuyler
9	FW	USA	Maggie Westfal
10	DF	USA	Brittany Duhamel
11	FW	USA	Fortuna Velaj

No.	Pos.	Nation	Player
12	MF	USA	Shauna Edwards
13	DF	USA	Kelly d'Ambrisi
14	FW	USA	Catherine Nathans
15	DF	USA	Alyssa Decker
16	MF	USA	Mallory Smith
17	DF	USA	Nathalie Urbas
18	MF	USA	Lisa Burbige
19	MF	USA	Ahna Johnson
20	DF	USA	Jess Schloth
23	DF	USA	Robyn Decker
24	DF	USA	Adrienne Boyer
25	FW	USA	Kristin Forster

== Year-by-year ==
Year	Division	League	Reg. season	Playoffs
2007	1	USL W-League	Associate Member	
2008	1	USL W-League	5th, Northeast	Did not qualify
2009	2	USL W-League	6th, Northeast	Did not qualify

== Coaches ==
- (United States) Dave Clarke 2008–2009

== Stadia ==
- Sage Park, Berlin, Connecticut 2008-2009
- Reese Stadium, New Haven, Connecticut 2008 (3 games)
- Stadium at Pomperaug High School, Southbury, Connecticut 2008 (1 game)
