= Daniel Clitnovici =

Australian soccer coach (born 1982)

Personal information
- Date of birth: 8 July 1982 (age 44)
- Place of birth: Surfers Paradise, Australia
- Height: 1.80 m (5 ft 11 in)
- Position: Midfielder

Team information
- Current team: Texas A&M–Corpus Christi Islanders

Senior career*
| Years | Team | Apps | (Gls) |
| 1998–2001 | Gold Coast Knights | | |
| 2002–2003 | Universitatea Craiova | | |
| 2003–2004 | Barnsley | | |
| 2004 | Gold Coast Knights | | |
| 2005–2006 | Universitatea Craiova | | |
| 2007–2008 | Apollon Smyrnis | | |
| 2008 | Elche Ilicitano | | |

Managerial career
- 2008–2011: Colorado Force (assistant)
- 2011–2014: Colorado Rapids (USL Super 20)
- 2011–2014: Colorado Rapids Women
- 2014–2015: Colorado Pride
- 2015–2016: Western New York Flash) (assistant)
- 2016–2017: Ohio State University (assistant)
- 2017–2022: Villanova University (associate)
- 2022: Atlantic City FC
- 2022–24: Ursinus College
- 2024–: Texas A&M–Corpus Christi Islanders
- * Club domestic league appearances and goals

Daniel Clitnovici (born 8 July 1982) is an Australian soccer coach and former professional soccer player. Clitnovici currently is the head coach of division one Texas A&M–Corpus Christi Islanders Women's Soccer program. He was the former head coach of Atlantic City FC, the Colorado Rapids Women, Colorado Pride Women and the assistant coach of the Western New York Flash of the National Women's Soccer League; the 2010 W-League champions, 2011 Women's Professional Soccer (WPS) Champions, the 2012 Women's Premier Soccer League Elite Champions, and the 2013 and 2016 National Women's Soccer League season champions.

== Playing career ==
As a player Clitnovici played with Romanian Liga I champion Universitatea Craiova, Apollon Smyrnis in Greece, Gold Coast United FC in Australia, as well as several other clubs in England, Spain and Australia.

== Coaching career ==
Clitnovici was the previous head coach of Colorado Rapids Women and Colorado Pride both of which played in the USL W-League. He was named USL W-League Coach of the year in 2014 after leading w-league expansion side Colorado Pride to a Western Conference Championship final. While at Colorado Pride Clitnovici established a defense that did not concede a single goal on its home field and produced a fast-flowing attacking style of play that entertained W-League fans league wide. Clitnovici's direction and guidance to players at the Pride were very influential, as several of his players from his 2014 squad have gone on to play professionally in the US and abroad.

In 2012 in addition to coaching the Colorado Rapids Women, Daniel Clitnovici was the head coach of the Colorado Rapids U20 Ladies team which went on to win a United Soccer League Under 20 National Championship hosted at IMG Academy in Bradenton, Florida. The Colorado Rapids defeated DC United 1–0.

Clitnovici previously managed and directed the Western New York Flash Youth Academy in the role of academy executive director of coaching. Clitnovici was hired by the Ohio State Women's Soccer program in 2016 as an assistant head coach In February 2017 it was announced by Villanova University Wildcats that Clitnovici would be joining their women's soccer program. His coaching education includes: US Soccer Federation "A" License, UEFA "A" License, NSCAA Advanced National License, NSCAA Advanced National GK License, NSCAA Director of Coaching License
