= Diane Shader Smith =

- Occupation: Author
- Writing career
- Notable works: Undressing Infidelity: Why More Wives are Unfaithful, Mallory's 65 Roses, Salt in My Soul: an Unfinished Life
- Website: saltinmysoulbook

Diane Shader Smith is an American writer, publicist, and cystic fibrosis advocate.

== Life ==
Smith wrote for the ABC-TV series, General Hospital and for KIIS Radio Los Angeles. Smith worked at Rogers and Cowan in Hollywood with clients ranging from the Beverly Hills Hotel to Microsoft, and award-winning film marketing campaigns like The Passion of the Christ.

Diane lives in Los Angeles with her husband, Mark, and her son, Micah. Her daughter, Mallory Smith died in November 2017. Mallory is the author of the book Salt in My Soul: An Unfinished Life.

== Advocacy ==
"An Evening in Mallory's Garden" was started in 1995 and has raised more than $5 million.

== Works ==
"Undressing Infidelity: Why More Wives are Unfaithful" is a series interviews with women who have cheated to understand why wives stray more often than men.

Smith edited her daughter's memoir Salt in My Soul: an Unfinished Life by request for posthumous publication through Penguin Random House on March 12, 2019. It was subsequently optioned for production before its publication by The Invisible War and The Hunting Ground Oscar-nominated directors Kirby Dick and Amy Ziering.

== List of works ==
- A Test of Will, Diane Shader Smith, First edition February 19, 2002, ISBN 0970035322
- Undressing Infidelity: Why More Wives are Unfaithful, Adam Media Corp, First edition January 31, 2005, ASIN B01K3OG1N2
- Mallory's 65 Roses, Diane Shader Smith, First edition August 15, 1997, ISBN 0970035306
- Salt in My Soul: an Unfinished Life, Penguin Random House, Spiegel & Grau, First edition March 12, 2019, ISBN 1984855425
