= Ashleigh Gunning =

American retired soccer player

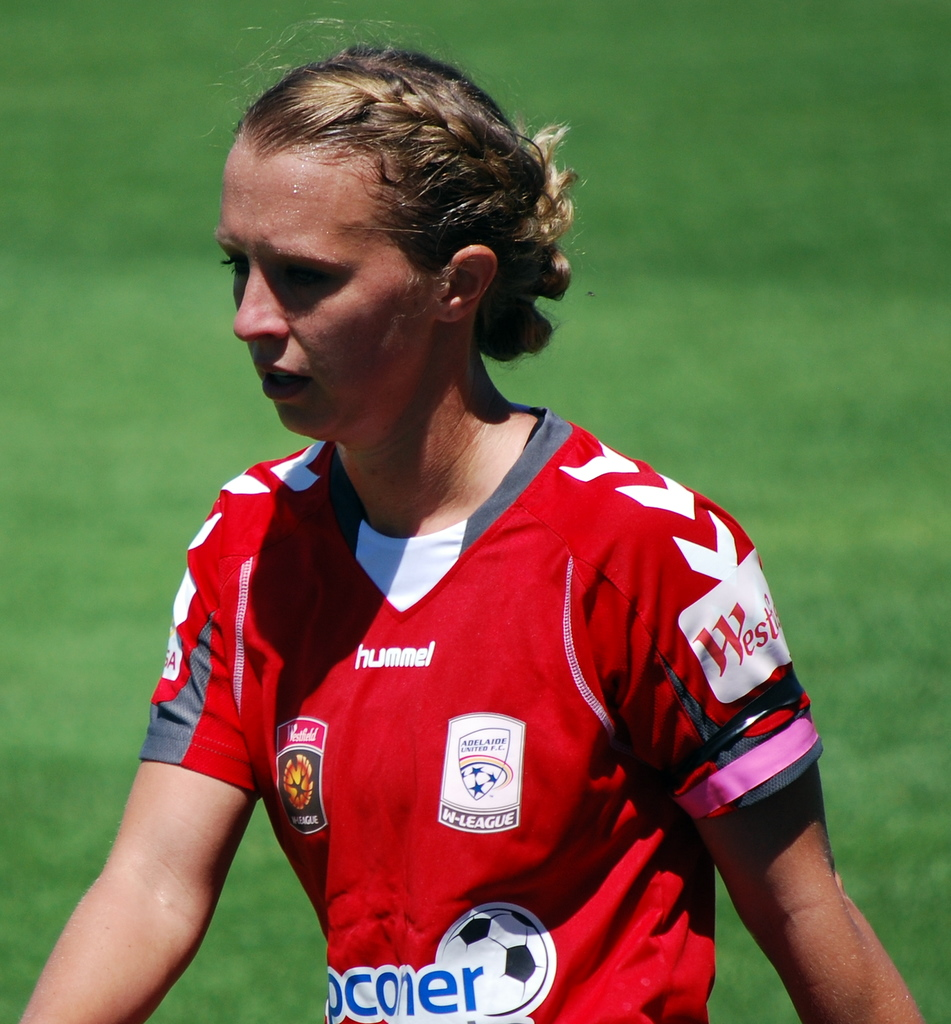
- Gunning playing for Adelaide United

Personal information
- Full name: Sarah Ashleigh Gunning
- Date of birth: April 25, 1985 (age 41)
- Place of birth: Baton Rouge, Louisiana, United States
- Height: 5 ft 7 in (1.70 m)
- Position: Forward

College career
| Years | Team | Apps | (Gls) |
| 2003–2004 | LSU Tigers | | |
| 2006–2008 | Coastal Carolina Chanticleers | | |

Senior career*
| Years | Team | Apps | (Gls) |
| 2008 | Charlotte Lady Eagles | | |
| 2009 | Hudson Valley Quickstrike Lady Blues | | |
| 2010 | Sky Blue FC | | |
| 2011 | Eskilstuna United | 9 | (8) |
| 2011 | magicJack | 2 | (0) |
| 2011 | Adelaide United | | |
| 2012 | Arna-Bjørnar | 9 | (4) |
| 2012–2013 | Kvarnsvedens IK | 18 | (11) |
- * Club domestic league appearances and goals as of November 8, 2015 ‡ National team caps and goals as of 22:47, December 11, 2009 (UTC)

Sarah Ashleigh Gunning (born April 25, 1985) is an American retired soccer forward who most recently played for Kvarnsvedens IK in the 2012–2013 seasons. She previously played for Norwegian club Arna-Bjørnar in the Toppserien, Adelaide United in the Australian W-League and magicJack in the WPS.
