= Mallori Lofton-Malachi =

American soccer player (born 1987)

Personal information
- Full name: Mallori Mthandi Lofton-Malachi
- Date of birth: September 16, 1987 (age 39)
- Place of birth: Philadelphia, United States
- Position: Goalkeeper

Youth career
- West Chester Predators

College career
Years	Team	Apps	(Gls)
2006–2009	South Florida Bulls	58	(0)

Senior career*
Years	Team	Apps	(Gls)
2007–2009	Tampa Bay Hellenic		
2010	Atlanta Beat		
2011	Thróttur	1	(0)
2012	Åland United		
2012–2015	SC Sand	14	(0)
- * Club domestic league appearances and goals

Mallori Mthandi Lofton-Malachi (born September 16, 1987) is an American retired soccer goalkeeper.

Lofton-Malachi retired from professional soccer in 2015, following issues with concussions.
