= Mallory Smith =

American author and cystic fibrosis advocate

- Born: October 12, 1992; Los Angeles
- Died: November 15, 2017 (aged 25)
- Education: Stanford University
- Occupation: Author
- Writing career
- Genre: Memoirs
- Notable work: Salt in My Soul: An Unfinished Life

Mallory Beatrice Smith (October 12, 1992 – November 15, 2017) was an author and cystic fibrosis advocate.

== Early life ==
Smith was born to Mark Smith and Diane Shader Smith on October 12, 1992, and diagnosed with cystic fibrosis, a "progressive, genetic disease that causes persistent lung infections and limits the ability to breathe over time", at age 3. The disease cripples by inhibiting oxygen and nutrient absorption required for growth and energy with treatment regimens of more than 60 pills per day and waking up repeatedly for antibiotic IV treatments and lung exercises, yet Smith was determined to live well. She maintained a 4.3 grade point average, was captain of three different team sports, and was elected prom queen.

By age 15, bacteria had colonized Smith's lungs, including a form of Burkholderia cenocepacia which mutated over a decade of antibiotic treatment from a normal vegetable bacteria into a rare, aggressive superbug with no known treatment. This allowed her to push for experimental options with bacteriophage treatment, which engineers viruses to destroy bacteria. She attended Stanford University, graduating Phi Beta Kappa, majoring in human biology with a concentration in environmental anthropology. She also worked as a senior producer on Green Grid Radio, an environmental podcast featured on KCRW, National Radio Project and State of the Human. After graduation, Smith became a cystic fibrosis advocate and began work as a writer. However, her lungs took a turn for the worse in 2012 and she received a lung transplant on September 11, 2017. Unfortunately, the superbug had survived in her throat and she died on November 15, 2017, at age 25 before bacteriophage treatment could be successfully administered. She provided lung samples to further the research for other patients.

== Advocacy ==
Smith's determination to live with joy despite her physical prognosis was inspirational to research and the cystic fibrosis community Smith's outlook is credited as a driving force behind two cystic fibrosis charities. "An Evening in Mallory’s Garden" was started in 1995 and has raised more than $5 million while Lunges4Lungs gained national awareness including corporate support from companies like Lululemon and star support including Katy Perry.

== Works ==
In 2016 she co-authored The Gottlieb Native Garden: A California Love Story with horticulturist Susan Lenman Gottlieb which was published by the National Wildlife Federation,. Her memoir, Salt in My Soul: an Unfinished Life, was posthumously edited and published at her direction by her mother, writer/publicist Diane Shader Smith through Penguin Random House on March 12, 2019. It was subsequently optioned for production before its publication by The Invisible War and The Hunting Ground Oscar-nominated directors Kirby Dick and Amy Ziering.

== List of works ==
- The Gottlieb Native Garden: A California Love Story, National Wildlife Federation, First edition October 25, 2016, ISBN 0692783393
- Salt in My Soul: an Unfinished Life, Penguin Random House, Spiegel & Grau, First edition March 12, 2019, ISBN 1984855425
