= Whitney Engen =

American soccer player (born 1987)

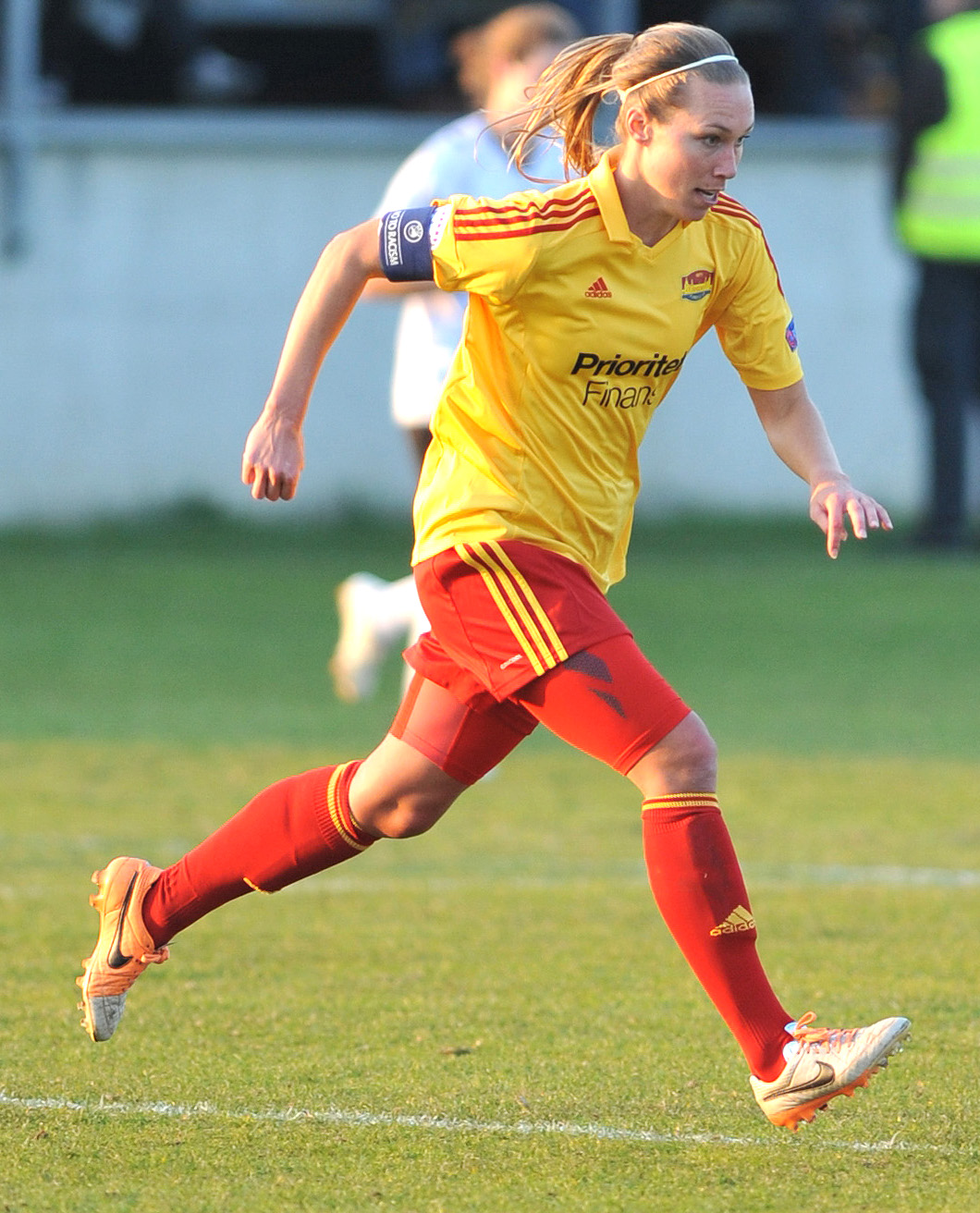
- Engen playing for Tyresö FF in 2014

Personal information
- Full name: Whitney Elizabeth Engen
- Date of birth: November 28, 1987 (age 38)
- Place of birth: Torrance, California, United States
- Height: 5 ft 8 in (1.73 m)
- Position: Defender

Youth career
- Slammers FC

College career
Years	Team	Apps	(Gls)
2006–2009	North Carolina Tar Heels	105	(19)

Senior career*
Years	Team	Apps	(Gls)
2009	Pali Blues		
2010	Chicago Red Stars	24	(0)
2011	Western New York Flash	17	(0)
2011	→ Tyresö FF (loan)	6	(1)
2012	Pali Blues		
2013	Liverpool Ladies	12	(1)
2013–2014	Tyresö FF	4	(0)
2014	Houston Dash	11	(0)
2015	Western New York Flash	12	(0)
2016	Boston Breakers	13	(1)

International career
2006–2007	United States U-20		
2009	United States U-23		
2011–2016	United States	40	(4)
- * Club domestic league appearances and goals

Whitney Elizabeth Engen (born November 28, 1987) is an American former soccer player and FIFA Women's World Cup champion. She played as a defender for the United States women's national soccer team as well as the Boston Breakers of the National Women's Soccer League, the highest division of women's soccer in the United States. She first appeared for the United States national team during the 2011 Algarve Cup in a match against Norway on March 4. During her time with the team, she made 40 appearances for the team and scored four goals.

Engen has represented the United States in one FIFA Women's World Cup in 2015 and one Olympic tournament in 2016. Engen played collegiate soccer with the North Carolina Tar Heels from 2006 to 2009. Following her collegiate career, she was selected fourth overall by the Chicago Red Stars in the 2010 WPS Draft that took place on January 15, 2010. Between 2011 and 2015, Engen played professionally for the Western New York Flash, Tyresö FF, Pali Blues, Liverpool Ladies and the Houston Dash before ending up with the Boston Breakers for the 2016 NWSL season.

On October 2, 2016, Engen announced that she had been released by the United States women's national team. On February 6, 2017, Engen announced that she was stepping away from professional soccer and will not play in the NWSL in 2017.

== Early life ==
Born in Torrance, California, to parents Chris and Kim Engen, Whitney was raised with her brother, Taylor. Although Engen aspired to be a gymnast, her tall stature limited her ability to do gymnastics. Instead, she switched to soccer. Growing up, her family was also very competitive and encouraged friendly competitions between her and her brother.

This experience taught me two things: that it's good to persist even when you're not having success, and that I did not want to sit on the bench.

— Engen

Engen played club soccer growing up, ending her youth career with Slammers FC (SFC) in Newport Beach. Her previous team did not give her playing time, leading her to switch to SFC, joining future national teammate Christen Press. While with SFC, the team won back-to-back state and regional championships in 2004 and 2005. The team also appeared in national championships during those years, taking second in 2004 and third in 2005. During her youth career, Engen also played with the '86 Olympic Development Program team that clinched regional and national titles.

Engen attended Palos Verdes Peninsula High School in Rolling Hills Estates, California, where she played varsity soccer during her freshman and sophomore years. She played two years of varsity soccer as a forward and attacking midfielder. She did not play during her junior year due to an injury and opted to concentrate on club soccer during senior year and did not play with her high school team. She was also named the Most Valuable Offensive Player as a freshman and Most Valuable Player as a sophomore. Engen graduated high school on June 15, 2006, and Soccer Buzz ranked her among the Top 25 recruits in the nation.

=== University of North Carolina ===
Engen attended the University of North Carolina and played soccer for the Tar Heels under head coach Anson Dorrance all four years. She began her college career with the Tar Heels playing as a forward before transitioning to central defense. During her time there, the Tar Heels won the NCAA Women's Soccer Championship three times: in 2006, 2008, and 2009.

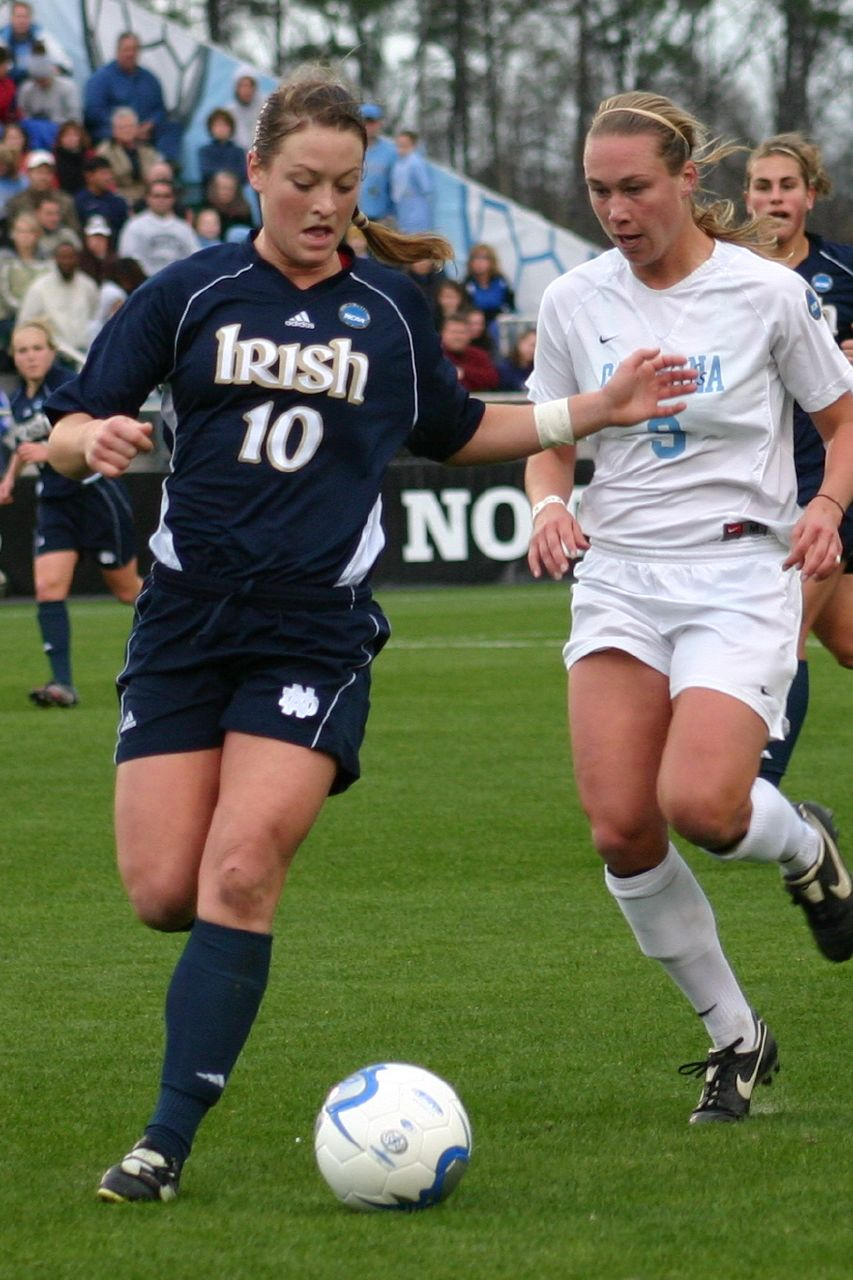
Engen (right) with the North Carolina Tar Heels on December 3, 2006, during the NCAA Women's Soccer Tournament championship game. Photo by Jarrett Campbell / CC BY

During her 2006 season as a freshman, Engen appeared in 27 games, starting 24. She had the third most points at Carolina that season with 37 and was tied for second most goals and assists on the team with 12 and 13, respectively. In the ACC Tournament, Engen had at least one point in each of the team's matches, including two goals against North Carolina State in the quarterfinals, two assists against Clemson University in the semifinals, and an assist on the game-winning goal in overtime against Florida State University in the final. In the NCAA Women's Soccer Tournament, Engen had at least one point in five of six of the team's matches, including two goals against Navy in the second round, a goal and assists against the University of Tennessee in the third round, a goal against Texas A&M University in the quarterfinals, and an assist on the game-winning goal against Notre Dame in the final to help the Tar Heels take the NCAA Championship. After a successful freshman season, Engen won Carolina's soccer team Gift of Fury award. She was also named to the Soccer Buzz All-America Freshman Second-Team, Soccer America All-Freshman Second-Team, Top Drawer Soccer All-Freshman First-Team, ACC All-Tournament team, ACC All-Freshman Team, and Soccer Buzz All-Southeast Region Freshman Team.

During the 2007 season, Engen appeared in 23 games, starting all 23. She had the third most points on the team during the season with 20. She scored six goals and recorded eight assists in the season, her first goal being against the University of North Carolina at Greensboro. In the NCAA Women's Soccer Tournament, Engen scored two goals and recorded an assist against High Point University in the first round. In addition, she had goals in matches against Ohio State, Duke, and the University of North Carolina at Greensboro in the second round. At the end of the season, Engen was named to the All-ACC Academic team.

In her junior season, Engen switched from being a forward to center back for the Tar Heels. She appeared started all 28 games for the team and led the team in minutes played with 2,518. She recorded three assists in the season. In addition, she tied the school record for games played and started in a season. In the ACC Tournament, Engen recorded an assist in the victory against Virginia Tech in the championship final. In the NCAA Tournament, Engen recorded an assist on the game-winning goal against Texas A&M in the quarterfinals. The Tar Heels went on to win the 2008 NCAA Women's Soccer Tournament after a 2–1 win over Notre Dame. After another successful season, Engen was named to the NSCAA All-America Third Team, Soccer Buzz All-America Second-Team, All-ACC Second Team, ACC All-Tournament Team, NSCAA All-Southeast Region Team, and Soccer Buzz All-Southeast Region Team. Academically, Engen received ACC All-Academic Team and NSCAA Collegiate Scholar All-America First Team honors.

In the 2009 season, Engen appeared in all 27 games for the team, starting all 27. In her 2,365 minutes played, Engen scored one goal and recorded three assists in the season. The Tar Heels went on to win the 2009 NCAA Women's Soccer Tournament after a 1–0 win over Stanford in the championship game. As a senior, she won the Honda Sports Award as the nation's top soccer player.

== Club career ==
=== Pali Blues, 2009 ===
On April 16, 2009, Engen and North Carolina teammate Ashlyn Harris signed with the Pali Blues of the W-League. The W-League was often used by college players as a summer playing option because of its status as an open league, allowing college players to maintain eligibility. The Pali Blues went undefeated in the regular season and then went on to win the W-League Championship with a 2–1 win over Washington Freedom in the final.

=== Chicago Red Stars, 2010 ===
On January 15, 2010, Engen was drafted fourth overall to the Chicago Red Stars of Women's Professional Soccer in the 2010 WPS Draft. Engen appeared in all 24 games for Red Stars in the regular season and played all but four minutes for the team. The Red Stars finished sixth in the 2010 WPS season and did not advance to the playoffs.

=== Western New York Flash, 2011 ===
In December 2010, the Western New York Flash, previously part of the W-League, joined the WPS for the 2011 season. Shortly after, Engen signed with the team. She played in 17 of the team's 18 regular season games to help the Flash finish first in the regular season and advance to the playoffs. Engen appeared in the 2011 WPS Championship on August 27, 2011, against the Philadelphia Independence. The game was tied 1–1 after regulation and extra time, leaving the outcome of the match to be decided by penalty kicks. The Flash won the championship after goalkeeper Ashlyn Harris blocked the shot by Philadelphia's Laura del Rio. Following the 2011 season, Engen was named WPS Defender of the Year and to the 2011 WPS Top XI.

=== Tyresö FF, 2011 ===
Immediately following the 2011 WPS season, Engen joined Swedish team Tyresö FF on loan. She made her first appearance for the team on September 4, 2011, in a match against Umeå IK and made a total of six appearances while with the team and scored one goal. She made her final appearance of the season on October 15.

=== Second stint at Pali Blues, 2012 ===
On January 30, 2012, it was announced that the 2012 WPS season would be suspended following legal and financial challenges. Although the league was intended to resume for the 2013 season, it officially folded in May. In April, Engen joined the Pali Blues of the W-League for the 2012 season.

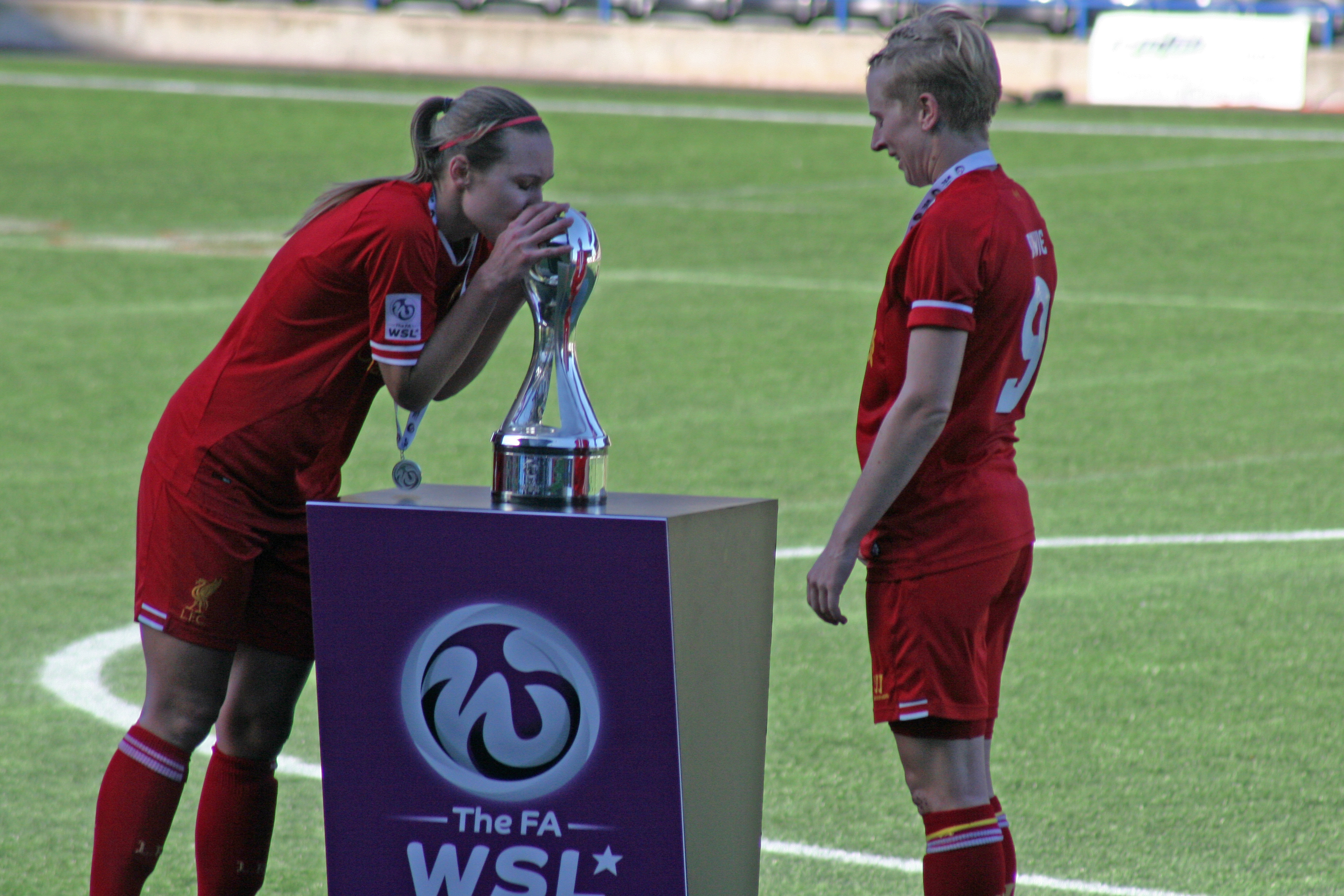
Engen (left) celebrating after winning the FA WSL championship with Liverpool L.F.C. in 2013. Photo by Kevin Walsh / CC BY

=== Liverpool L.F.C., 2013 ===
In October 2012, following the W-League season, Engen signed with English club Liverpool Ladies in the Football Association Women's Super League, the highest division of women's soccer in England, for the 2013 season from April to September. She made her first appearance for the team on April 14 in a match against Notts County Ladies FC. She made 12 total league appearances for the team. She made one goal in a match against Chelsea LFC on May 12.

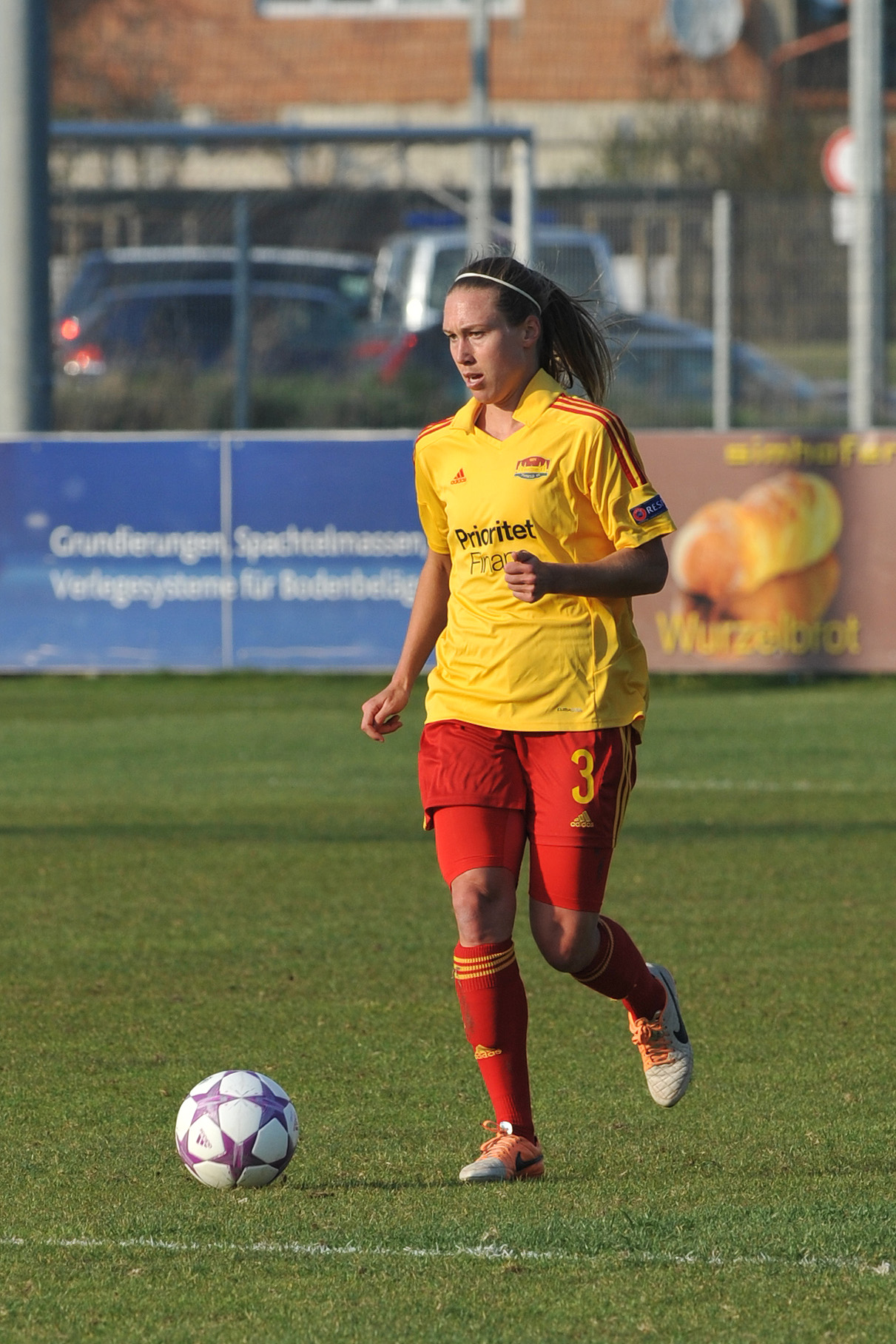
Engen with Tyresö FF on March 29, 2014

=== Second stint at Tyresö FF, 2013 ===
Tyresö announced in August 2013 that they had agreed a deal to re-sign Engen at the end of her Liverpool contract. She was expected to move back to Sweden in late September or early October and would be available to play for Tyresö in their UEFA Women's Champions League games. Engen, former UNC teammate Ashlyn Haris, and Ali Krieger all signed short-term contracts with the team. They joined United States national team members Christen Press and Meghan Klingenberg, who were already with the club on long-term contracts. In December 2013, Tyresö revealed that Engen had extended her contract and would stay in Sweden until June 2014 in orto pursue Champions League glory along with Press and Klingenberg.

=== Houston Dash, 2014 ===
Following the folding of the WPS in 2012, the United States Soccer Federation formed a new professional soccer league, the National Women's Soccer League, which played its inaugural season in 2013. Although Engen opted to play in Liverpool for the 2013 season, Engen was allocated to NWSL expansion team Houston Dash via the 2014 NWSL Player Allocation in January 2014 She made her first appearance for the team on June 8 in a match against Sky Blue FC. Engen made a total of 11 appearances for the team in the regular season, playing a total of 978 minutes. The Dash finished last in the league and did not advance to the playoffs.

=== Second stint at Western New York Flash, 2015 ===
On October 16, 2014, the Houston Dash traded Engen, Becky Edwards, and a third round pick in the 2016 NWSL College Draft in exchange for Carli Lloyd from the Western New York Flash. Engen missed almost half of the 2015 NWSL season due to commitments with the United States women's national team at the FIFA Women's World Cup in Canada. She made three appearances for the Flash before the World Cup then returned to the team on July 19 in a match against Sky Blue FC. She made 12 total appearances for the team in the regular season, playing 1080 minutes. The Flash finished seventh in the league and did not advance to the playoffs.

=== Boston Breakers, 2016 ===
The Western New York Flash announced on November 10, 2015, that they had traded Engen to the Chicago Red Stars in exchange for Abby Erceg, Adriana Leon, and a first-round pick in the 2016 NWSL College Draft. The Chicago Red Stars then announced on November 23 that they had traded Engen to the Boston Breakers in exchange for Alyssa Naeher and a third-round pick in the 2016 NWSL College Draft. Engen remained with the Breakers for the 2016 season before joining the United States women's national team for the 2016 Summer Olympics in Rio de Janeiro. Engen returned to the Breakers in late August, following the completion of the games, and made five more appearances for the team. The Breakers finished the 2016 season last in the league and did not advance to the playoffs. The Breakers named Engen Defender of the Year following the 2016 season.

=== Taking off the 2017 season ===
On February 6, 2017, Engen announced that she was "stepping away" from soccer and would not rejoin the Boston Breakers for the 2017 NWSL season. Although Engen would not be playing professional soccer with a club team or with the United States national team, she made it clear that there was a possibility she might return to the NWSL in the future.

== International career ==
=== Senior national team ===
==== First caps, 2010–12 ====
Engen received her first call up to the United States women's national team in March 2010 for a training camp that included two matches against Mexico on March 28 and 31. She was then called into a training camp in September leading into two matches against China on October 2 and 6. Engen was not named to the roster for the 2010 CONCACAF Women's World Cup Qualifying tournament and did not return to the national team until early 2011.

Engen returned to the national team in 2011 for a six-day training camp at Home Depot Center in Carson, California, from January 8 to 13. Engen then joined the national team for a 32-player training camp in Florida that took place from February 3 to 9 in preparation for the 2011 Algarve Cup. Following the camp, Engen was named to the 23-player roster for the Algarve Cup. Engen made her first appearance for the national team in the second match of the Algarve Cup on March 4 against Norway. She came in for Ali Krieger in the 78th minute to help the United States defeat Norway 2–0. Engen also made an appearance during the team's final group match against Finland on March 7. The United States went on to win the 2011 Algarve Cup title after a 4–2 win over Iceland in the final.

From April 18 to May 6, Engen joined the national team for a three-week training camp in Florida. Following the training camp, the 21-player roster for the 2011 FIFA Women's World Cup was released and Engen was not a member of the team. Following the World Cup, Engen trained with the national team for two weeks in November in Arizona leading into a match against Sweden on November 19. Engen was then called up for an 18-day training camp in Carson, California at The Home Depot Center from December 3 to 20.

Although Engen did not play a game with the national team in 2012, she traveled and trained extensively with the team throughout the year. Engen trained with the national team during the first training camp of 2012 from January 7 to 15. She was not named to the 20-player roster for the 2012 CONCACAF Women's Olympic Qualifying tournament but joined the team following the tournament for a training camp in Frisco, Texas. On February 17, Engen was named to a 23-player roster that would travel to Portugal for the 2012 Algarve Cup. She was subsequently named to the roster of 21 players that would suit up for the matches of the tournament but did not make an appearance during the tournament.

Engen traveled to Japan with the national team for the Women's Kirin Challenge Cup in early April. Following the tournament, she trained with the national team in Florida from April 18 to 30. She was then called up to a training camp in Princeton, New Jersey from May 10 to 25 in preparation for a match against China on May 27 but was not named to the 18-player roster for the match. Engen was not named to the roster that would represent the United States at the 2012 Summer Olympics in London.

==== 2013–14 ====
In January 2013, Engen was called up to a 29-player training camp leading up to two matches against Scotland in early February. On February 21, Engen was named to the 23-player roster for the 2013 Algarve Cup in Portugal that took place from March 6 to 13. She made her fourth career appearance for the team on March 8 in the match against China. She started the match and scored the fifth and final goal of the game in the 84th minute. Engen came in for Shannon Boxx in the 85th minute of the match against Sweden on March 11 and started in the final match against Germany to help the United States win the Algarve Cup title. Following the 2013 Algarve Cup, Engen traveled to Europe with the national team for matches against Germany and the Netherlands in early April. In late May, Engen was named to the 21-player roster that traveled to Canada to train in preparation for a match against Canada on June 2. She played all 90 minutes of the match to help the United States win 3–0.

Engen started off 2014 at a national team training camp from January 8 to 15 at U.S. Soccer's National Training Center in Carson, California. On February 24, Engen was named to the 24-player roster for the 2014 Algarve Cup that took place from March 5 to 12. She played all 90 minutes of the team's first match of the tournament on March 5 against Japan, a 1–1 draw. Engen started and played all 90 minutes in the match against Denmark on March 10, a 5–3 defeat for the United States. The United States finished seventh in the tournament after a win over Korea DPR on March 12, although Engen did not appear in that final match.

Engen joined the team for a two-game series against China in April. She started in the match on April 6 and came in for an injured Rachel Van Hollebeke in the seventh minute of the second match on April 10. In late April, Engen was named to a 22-player roster for a match against Canada scheduled for May 8. She started the match, which ended in a 1–1 draw. She was then named to the roster for two games against France on June 14 and 19. She started in the second match on June 19.

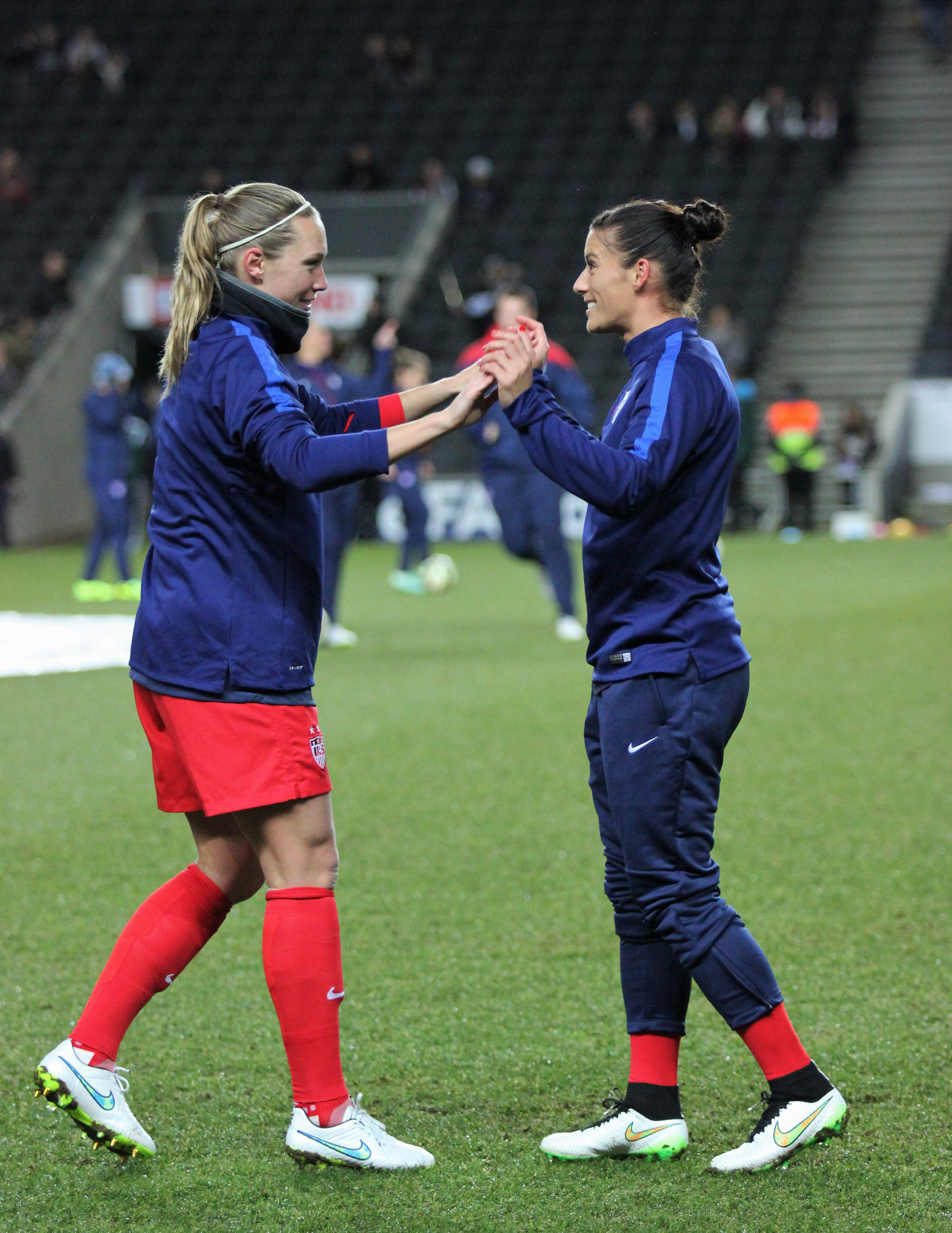
Engen and Ali Krieger with the United States women's national team before their game against England in 2015. Photo by joshjdss / CC BY

Engen joined the national team for a training camp at the end of August in order to prepare for two matches against Mexico in September as well as the 2014 CONCACAF Women's Qualifying tournament in October. Engen came in during the second half of the match on September 13 and scored the team's sixth goal in the 58th minute. Following the matches, Engen was named to the roster for the 2014 CONCACAF Women's Championship that served as a qualification for the 2015 FIFA Women's World Cup. Engen made three appearances in the tournament. She started for the United States in their second group match against Guatemala on October 17. She scored a goal in the 58th minute to help the United States defeat Guatemala, 5–0. She also played all 90 minutes in the team's final group match against Haiti on October 20. Her third appearances came during the semifinal match against Mexico on October 24, a 3–0 victory for the United States that also qualified them for the 2015 FIFA Women's World Cup. The United States went on to win the tournament after a 6–0 victory over Costa Rica on October 26.

Following the CONCACAF Qualifying tournament, Engen was named to the 24-player roster for the International Tournament of Brasília in Brazil that took place from December 10 to 21. She made one appearance during the tournament during the match against Argentina on December 18. The United States faced Brazil in the final. Although the game was a 0–0 draw, the tournament title was given to Brazil, who had more points from the group stage.

==== 2015 and the FIFA Women's World Cup ====
Engen started off the year at a 21-day training camp in 2015 from January 5 to 25 at the U.S. Soccer National Training Center in Carson, California. Following the training camp, Engen was named to the 24-player team that would travel on a 13-day trip to Europe for matches against France and England in mid-February. Engen played all 90 minutes in the match against France on February 8. She also played all 90 minutes in the match against England on February 13, which was a shutout victory for the United States.

On February 21, Engen was named to the 25-player roster for the 2015 Algarve Cup in Portugal. However, she did not appear in the tournament due to a hamstring injury. She was then named to a 25-player roster on March 20 for a match against New Zealand on April 4 in St. Louis. She did not appear in the match.

On April 14, 2015, Engen was named to the 23-player roster that would represent the United States at the 2015 FIFA Women's World Cup. She did not appear in a match during the tournament, but became a World Cup Champion on July 5, when the United States defeated Japan 5–2 in the Women's World Cup final. Engen joined the national team on a Victory Tour following their World Cup win that started in Pittsburgh, Pennsylvania on August 16 and ended in New Orleans, Louisiana on December 16.

==== 2016 and the Summer Olympics ====
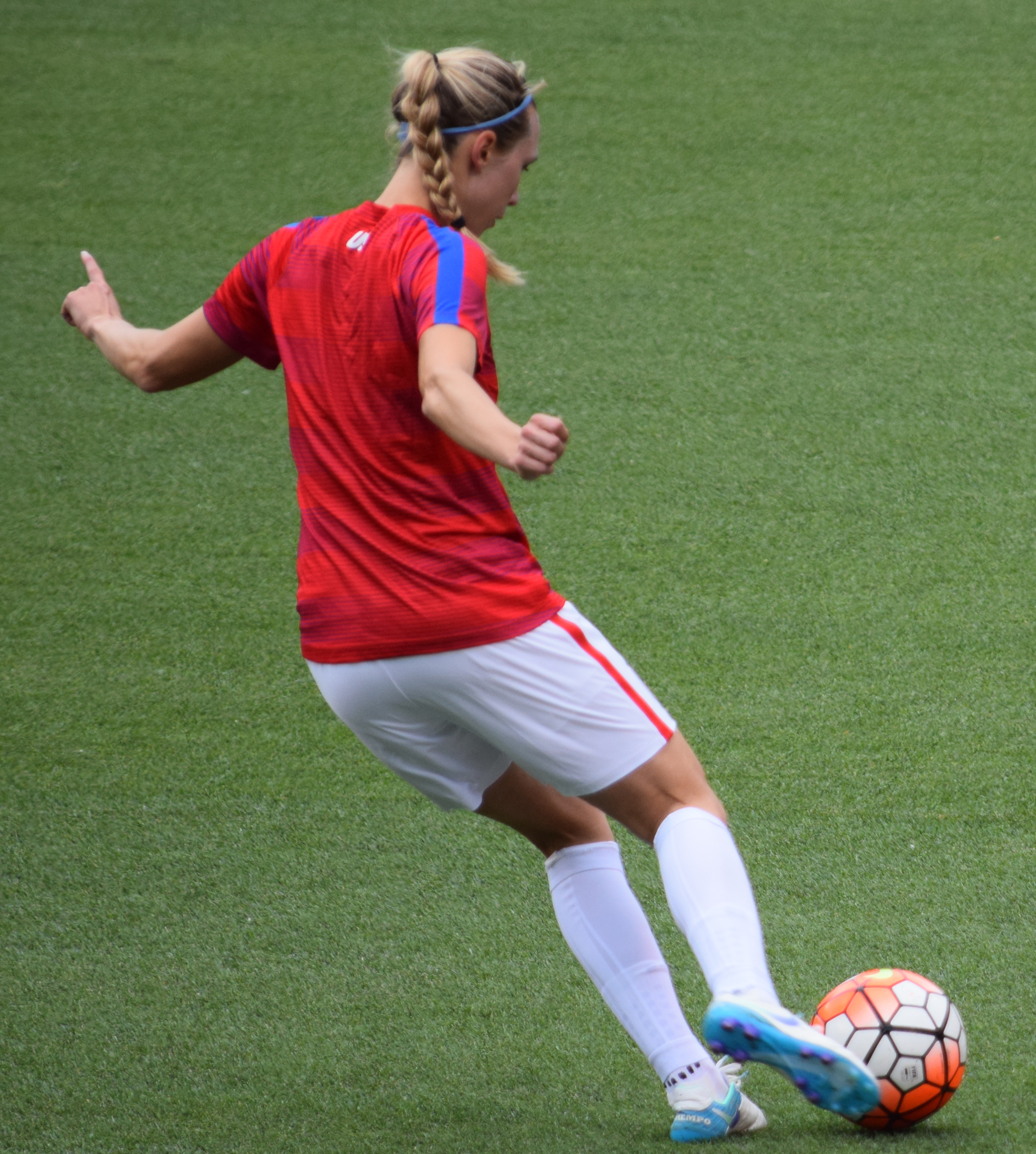
Engen with the United States women's national team before a match against Japan on June 5, 2016

Engen joined the national team for their first training camp of the year at the U.S. Soccer National Training Center in Carson, California from January 5 to 21. Following the training camp, head coach Jill Ellis released the 20-player roster for the 2016 CONCACAF Women's Olympic Qualifying tournament and Engen did not make the team. Engen was named to the roster for the 2016 SheBelieves Cup that took place from March 3 to 9. She came in for Meghan Klingenberg during the team's opening match against England on March 3. She also made appearances in the final two matches of the tournament, helping the United States win the 2016 SheBelieves Cup with a 2–1 win over Germany in their final game. Following the tournament, Engen joined a 23-player roster for a training camp ahead of two matches against Colombia in early April. Engen was also on the roster for another two-game series against Japan in early June.

On July 12, 2016, Engen was named to the 18-player team that would represent the United States at the 2016 Olympic Games in Rio de Janeiro. She made her Olympic debut on August 6 in place of an injured Julie Ertz in their second group match against France. She played all 90 minutes of the match to help the United States win 1–0. Engen once again started in the team's final group match on August 9 against Colombia, which ended in a 2–2 draw. Engen did not make an appearance during the team's match against Sweden on August 12. The United States fell to Sweden in a penalty shootout and did not advance in the tournament. This was the first time the United States women's team did not medal in an Olympic tournament.

=== Release from the national team ===
On October 2, 2016, Engen announced that she had been released by the United States women's national team. In her announcement of the news on Twitter, Engen stated that she was surprised but proud of her accomplishments with the team. At the time of her release, Engen had made 40 appearances for the team and scored 4 goals.

== Personal ==
Engen got engaged to Ryan Flanagan in September 2019. Engen studied political science at the University of North Carolina at Chapel Hill. Her parents encouraged her to have a plan after soccer. Engen officially became sworn in as an attorney on October 26, 2020. Engen is also an avid baker.

== Style of play ==
Engen is a strong defender in one-on-one situations and has stated that she believes this to be her strongest asset. In addition, she is known for her "commanding presence in the middle of the field and as a fine aerial threat for headers on set pieces."

== Career statistics ==
=== International goals ===
Key (expand for notes on "international goals" and sorting)
Location	Geographic location of the venue where the competition occurred Sorted by country name first, then by city name
Lineup	Start – played entire match on minute (off player) – substituted on at the minute indicated, and player was substituted off at the same time off minute (on player) – substituted off at the minute indicated, and player was substituted on at the same time (c) – captain Sorted by minutes played
Min	The minute in the match the goal was scored. For list that include caps, blank indicates played in the match but did not score a goal.
Assist/pass	The ball was passed by the player, which assisted in scoring the goal. This column depends on the availability and source of this information.
penalty or pk	Goal scored on penalty-kick which was awarded due to foul by opponent. (Goals scored in penalty-shoot-out, at the end of a tied match after extra-time, are not included.)
Score	The match score after the goal was scored. Sorted by goal difference, then by goal scored by the player's team
Result	The final score. Sorted by goal difference in the match, then by goal difference in penalty-shoot-out if it is taken, followed by goal scored by the player's team in the match, then by goal scored in the penalty-shoot-out. For matches with identical final scores, match ending in extra-time without penalty-shoot-out is a tougher match, therefore precede matches that ended in regulation
aet	The score at the end of extra-time; the match was tied at the end of 90' regulation
pso	Penalty-shoot-out score shown in parentheses; the match was tied at the end of extra-time
	Green background color – exhibition or closed door international friendly match
	Yellow background color – match at an invitational tournament
	Light-blue background color – FIFA women's world cup qualification match
NOTE: some keys may not apply for a particular football player

Goal	Date	Location	Opponent	Lineup	Min	Assist/pass	Score	Result	Competition
1	2013-03-08	Albufeira	China	Start	84	unassisted	5–0	5–0	Algarve Cup – group stage
2	2014-09-13	Sandy	Mexico	on 46' (off Sauerbrunn)	58	Christen Press	6–0	8–0	Friend
3	2014-10-17	Chicago	Guatemala	Start	58	Megan Rapinoe	4–0	5–0	World Cup qualifier:Group A
4	2015-08-16	Pittsburgh	Costa Rica	on 46' (off Johnston)	63	Abby Wambach	8–0	8–0	Friendly

== Honors and awards ==
North Carolina Tar Heels

- NCAA Women's Soccer Championship: 2006, 2008, 2009

Pali Blues

- W-League Championship: 2009

Western New York Flash

- WPS Championship: 2011

Liverpool

- FA Women's Super League: 2013

United States

- Algarve Cup: 2011, 2013, 2015
- CONCACAF Women's Championship: 2014
- FIFA Women's World Cup: 2015
- SheBelieves Cup: 2016

Individual

- University of North Carolina Gift of Fury award: 2006
- Soccer Buzz All-America Freshman Second-Team: 2006
- Soccer America All-Freshman Second-Team: 2006
- Top Drawer Soccer All-Freshman First-Team: 2006
- Soccer Buzz All-Southeast Region Second-Team: 2006
- Soccer Buzz All-Southeast Region Freshman Team: 2006
- ACC All-Tournament Team: 2006
- ACC All-Freshman Team: 2006
- ACC All-Academic Women's Soccer Team: 2006
- ACC Academic Honor Roll: 2007
- All-ACC Academic Team: 2007
- Soccer Buzz All-America Second-Team: 2008
- NSCAA All-America Third-Team: 2008
- All-ACC Second-Team: 2008
- ACC All-Tournament Team: 2008
- ACC All-Academic Team: 2008
- NSCAA Collegiate Scholar All-America First-Team: 2008
- NSCAA All-Southeast Region Team: 2008
- Soccer Buzz All-Southeast Region Team: 2008
- Duke adidas Classic MVP: 2008
- ACC Women's Soccer Scholar Athlete of the Year: 2009
- Honda Sports Award:2010
- WPS Defender of the Year: 2011
- WPS Top XI: 2011

== See also ==
- List of University of North Carolina at Chapel Hill Olympians
- Foreign players in the FA WSL
- List of foreign Damallsvenskan players
