= Katie Hultin =

American soccer player

Personal information
- Full name: Kathryn Joan Hultin
- Date of birth: September 27, 1982 (age 44)
- Place of birth: Denver, Colorado, United States
- Height: 5 ft 8 in (1.73 m)
- Position: Goalkeeper

Team information
- Current team: Illinois (coach)

College career
Years	Team	Apps	(Gls)
2001–2005	Washington State Cougars		

Senior career*
Years	Team	Apps	(Gls)
2005–2012	Seattle Sounders		
2008	FC Gold Pride		

Managerial career
- 2009–2014: Seattle (goalkeepers)
- 2014–2015: Illinois (goalkeepers)
- 2016–2018: Oregon (assistant)
- 2019–2022: Michigan (Asst./assoc. head coach)
- 2022–2024: Grand Valley State
- 2025–: Illinois
- * Club domestic league appearances and goals

Kathryn Joan Hultin (born September 27, 1982) is an American soccer coach for Illinois, formerly a goalkeeper for the Seattle Sounders Women of the United Soccer Leagues W-League. She previously played for FC Gold Pride in Women's Professional Soccer.

== Early life ==
Born in Denver, Colorado to parents, Wally and Donna Hultin, Katie attended Thomas Jefferson High School where she was elected school president and worked as the editor-in-chief of the yearbook. During her freshman year, she helped the team go 9–3 and finish second in the state. Her goals against average was third in state rankings. She was named to the all-conference first team and was an honorable mention All-State selection.

As a sophomore, her team went 8–3 and finished second in the league. Hultin earned honorable mention All-State honors and first team all-conference recognition.

During her junior year, she earned second team all-conference and team MVP honors and was chosen for the Colorado Women in Sports Award. She made the all-conference second team for kicking duties on the football team.

She was nominated for the Colorado Women in Sports award, kicked for the football team and was picked to the all-conference first team as kicker during her senior year at Thomas Jefferson.

Hultin also played for the Denver Soccer Club and the Region IV Olympic Development Program (ODP) team.

== Coaching career ==
Hultin was names 1st Assistant at the University of Michigan in April 2018. Hultin was the goalkeeper coach for the University of Oregon from February 2016 to April 2018. She was the goalkeeper coach at the University of Illinois from 2014 to 2016, and was previously a volunteer assistant coach at Seattle University beginning in 2009. She is on staff with the US Women's U19 National Team. She was a goalkeeper coach for the Washington Olympic Development Program (ODP) from 2007 to 2010. She holds a USSF A License and The USSF National Goalkeeper License. She coached for the FC Alliance from 2006 to 2014 and was the Director of Coaching for the girls side.

Hultin was named head women's soccer coach for the Grand Valley State University Lakers in May 2022.

After three seasons in charge at Grand Valley State, Hultin was hired as the head women's soccer coach for Illinois.

== Playing career ==
=== Washington State University ===
Hultin played for the Washington State Cougars from 2002 to 2005 and was captain for the 2003–2005 seasons and was named Washington State University Most Valuable Player in 2004. She was also names 'Most inspirational' 4 consecutive years. She was named Pac-10 Player of the Week twice in October 2004. She made the PAC-10 team of the week several times along with Soccer Buzz Team of the week.

=== Club ===
Hultin played previously for the FC Gold Pride in the Women's Professional Soccer league.

In 2010, Hultin played for the Seattle Sounders Women. She was named to the W-League's All-Western Conference team and two-time player of the week. Hultin has played for the Sounders for 5 seasons and has played in the W-League for a total of 9 seasons.
