= Chanté Sandiford =

Guyanese footballer (born 1990)

Personal information
- Full name: Chanté Sherese Sandiford
- Date of birth: 8 January 1990 (age 36)
- Place of birth: Bethpage, New York, United States
- Height: 1.75 m (5 ft 9 in)
- Position: Goalkeeper

Team information
- Current team: Stjarnan
- Number: 18

College career
Years	Team	Apps	(Gls)
2007	Villanova Wildcats	0	(0)
2009–2011	UCLA Bruins	50	(0)

Senior career*
Years	Team	Apps	(Gls)
2007–2008	Washington Freedom	13	(0)
2009	Washington Freedom Futures	10	(0)
2010–2011	Pali Blues	8	(0)
2012	New Jersey Wildcats	7	(0)
2013	Zorky Krasnogorsk	19	(0)
2015–2017	Selfoss	54	(0)
2018	Avaldsnes	6	(0)
2019–2021	Haukar	35	(0)
2021–2022	Stjarnan	24	(0)
2024	Þróttur Reykjavík	0	(0)
2025–	Selfoss	0	(0)

International career^{‡}
2007	United States U17		
2016–	Guyana	14	(0)
- * Club domestic league appearances and goals as of 14 March 2025 ‡ National team caps and goals as of 14 March 2025

Chanté Sherese Sandiford (born 8 January 1990) is a footballer who plays as a goalkeeper for Icelandic club Selfoss and captains the Guyana national team.

Sandiford has played in the UEFA Women's Champions League with Russian club FC Zorky Krasnogorsk and Norwegian club Avaldsnes IL. Born in the United States, she has represented Guyana internationally.

== Club career ==
Her collegiate career started at Villanova before her transfer to UCLA. A ruptured Achilles ended her collegiate career, but after 6 months of rehabilitation, she joined the New Jersey Wildcats.

After two seasons with Haukar, Sandiford signed with Úrvalsdeild kvenna club Stjarnan in early 2021.

During the 2023 season, Sandiford was a member of Grindavík's coaching staff. In August 2024, she signed signed with Þróttur Reykjavík as a reserve goalkeeper due to rash if injuries.

In February 2025, Sandiford signed with Selfoss.

== International career ==
Sandiford has already appeared with Guyana.

== Personal life ==
Sandiford is also a personal trainer, and launched an app for achieving fitness goals on a vegan diet.

== See also ==
- List of Guyana women's international footballers
