= James Galanis =

Australian soccer player and coach

Personal information
- Full name: James Galanis
- Date of birth: 24 June 1971 (age 55)
- Place of birth: Australia

Senior career*
Years	Team	Apps	(Gls)
- South Melbourne FC
- Northcote City FC

Managerial career
- 2010–2011: Atlanta Beat (Head Coach)
- * Club domestic league appearances and goals

James Galanis (born 24 June 1971) is an Australian professional soccer manager. Formerly head coach of the Atlanta Beat of Women's Professional Soccer, Galanis is currently Director of the Universal Soccer Academy.

== Playing career ==
Galanis played for South Melbourne FC in Australia's National Soccer League and with Northcote City FC in the Victorian State League.

== Managerial career ==
Galanis assumed the role of head coach for the Atlanta Beat during the 2010 WPS season. He was a trainer and mentor for U.S. national team player, Carli Lloyd, until she cut ties with him in 2020 following a lengthy rift with her family over his involvement in her life.

Galanis now directs the Medford Strikers Soccer Club in New Jersey.
