= Iris Mor =

Israeli newspaper editor, literary editor and writer

- איריס מור
- Born: 1952; Tel Aviv, Israel
- Died: 8 August 2017 (aged 64–65); Israel
- Education: Tel Aviv University; York University
- Occupations: Literary editor; Newspaper editor; Writer
- Children: 2

Iris Mor (Hebrew: איריס מור; 1952 – August 2017) was an Israeli newspaper editor, literary editor and writer. She was deputy editor of the newspaper Al HaMishmar weekly supplement and later of the local newspaper Ha'ir. Mor went on to be become editor of the culture sections of the newspapers Hadashot and Haaretz. She was editor-in-chief of the Keter Books publishing house between 2008 and 2012. Mor served as director of the Tel Aviv Municipality Department of Cultural Affairs from 2012 until her death in 2017.

== Biography ==
Mor was born in 1952, in Tel Aviv and grew up in the city. In her teenage years, she aided in the establishment of the youth newspaper Naashush. Following the completion of her service in the Israel Defense Forces, Mor began working for the Haaretz newspaper, firstly reporting and later editing, while finishing a Bachelor of Philosophy degree at Tel Aviv University. In 1980, she flew to Toronto, Canada to study for a master's degree in film philosophy at York University. When Mor went back to Israel in 1983, she got employment as deputy editor of the newspaper Al HaMishmar weekly supplement and was later appointed deputy editor of the local newspaper Ha'ir. According to Itay Stern, Mor made Ha'ir "into Israel’s leading local, one that both reflected and dictated Tel Aviv’s cultural moods." Following that, she edited Hadashot's culture section and set-up a daily magazine.

In 1994, Mor returned to work at Haaretz. She was assigned to work in its Hebrew-language Galeria section as editor, and converted it into a daily supplements that also featured in the newspaper's weekend edition. Mor made it Israel's leading cultural supplement, and remained in the position for the next fourteen years. On 1 December 2008, she was appointed the editor-in-chief of the Keter Books publishing house, replacing Ronit Weiss Berkowitz. Mor stayed in the role until she was named director of the Tel Aviv Municipality Department of Cultural Affairs over six other candidates in April 2012, taking over from her predecessor who left for medical reasons. She began working in the department in June 2012. Mor began and maintained several projects such as "One Moment Books", "One Moment Art" series of events, "Noise in the Library" and Saturday morning cultural events held at the Felicja Blumenthal Center.

== Personal life ==
She was married and had two children. Mor died on the evening of 8 August 2017 after a long, serious illness. On the early evening of 9 August, she was given a funeral service at the alternative cemetery in Kibbutz Givat Brenner.

== Legacy ==
She requested that her corneas be donated following her death. Neri Livne of Haaretz described Mor as "a meticulous, well-groomed, intelligent and wonderfully educated woman" who was "highly esteemed by those who worked under her, for whose rights she fought as a lioness, and aroused some terror among those who were not among her benefactors."
