= Nikki Marshall =

American soccer player (born 1988)

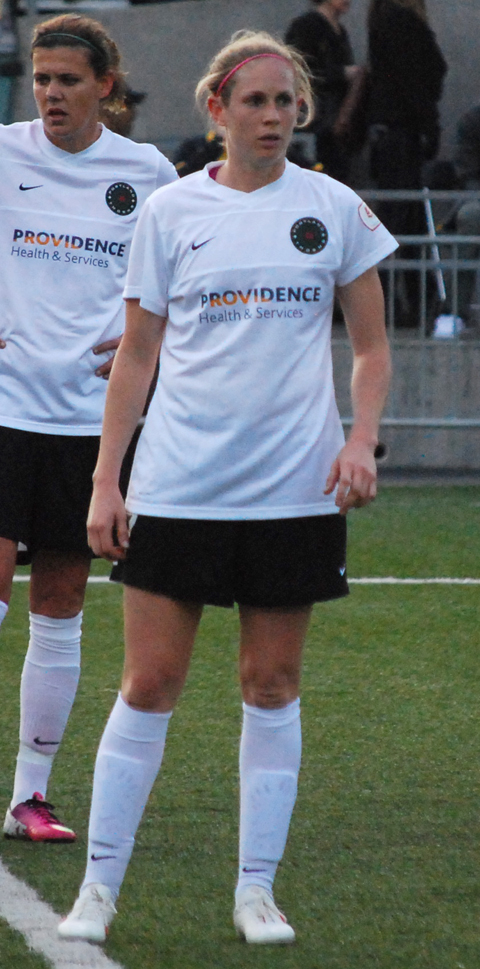
- Marshall with the Portland Thorns in May 2013

Personal information
- Full name: Nicole Sue Marshall
- Date of birth: June 2, 1988 (age 38)
- Place of birth: Thornton, Colorado, U.S.
- Height: 5 ft 7 in (1.70 m)
- Positions: Forward; defender

College career
Years	Team	Apps	(Gls)
2006–2009	Colorado Buffaloes		

Senior career*
Years	Team	Apps	(Gls)
2008–2009	Colorado Force	15	(6)
2010	Washington Freedom	24	(3)
2011	magicJack	8	(0)
2011	Boston Breakers	14	(0)
2013–2014	Portland Thorns	46	(0)

International career
2007–2008	United States U-20		
2009	United States U-23		
Medal record
Representing United States
Women's Football
Pan American Games
Silver medal – second place	2007 Rio de Janeiro	Team competition
- * Club domestic league appearances and goals as of July 23, 2014

Nicole Sue Marshall (born June 2, 1988) is an American retired soccer player. She most recently played for Portland Thorns FC in the National Women's Soccer League from 2013 to 2014. Previously, she was a forward for the University of Colorado women's soccer team and a defender for the Boston Breakers of Women's Professional Soccer and the United States U-23 women's national soccer team.

== Early life ==
Born in Thornton, Colorado to Mike and Kelly Marshall, Nikki was raised with her younger sister, Shaye, in Mead, Colorado. She attended Skyline High School in the nearby city of Longmont and was the leading scorer for the soccer team. She was named All-State three times during her sophomore, junior and senior years and was a three-time Longmont Times-Call Soccer Player of the Year. Marshall finished her high school career with 100 goals and 38 assists. She graduated as the top scorer in the school's history. She scored 23 goals and served 10 assists during her senior year alone and was named 2006 Northern Conference Player of the Year, all-region soccer player of the year, and Skyline Falcon of the Year. Also a decorated track athlete at the school, she earned All-State honors in the 100 meter, 400 meter relay and long jump during her junior year and won the state championship in the 800 medley as a senior.

=== Colorado Buffaloes ===
Marshall currently holds seventeen school records for the University of Colorado, and is the all-time leading goal scorer for the Colorado women's soccer team. As a freshman, she led the Buffaloes' most prolific offensive season with seventeen goals, all the way to the Sweet Sixteen in the 2006 NCAA postseason. She was on Soccer Buzz's All-American Fourth Team, All-American Freshman Team, All-Central Region First Team, All-Central Region Freshman team, and Freshman of the Year. She was on the Freshman All-American Team in Soccer America and National Player of the Week in Soccer Times. Her Big 12 Conference awards in 2006 include Newcomer of the Year, First Team All-Big 12, All-Big 12 Newcomer Team, and Big 12 All-Tournament Team. The University of Colorado Athletic Department awarded her Female Athlete of the Year and Female Freshman of the Year.

In 2007, Marshall led the Buffaloes in scoring for the second-straight year with nine goals, even though she had played defender that year for Colorado. Before her sophomore year season, she Marshall was on the Pre-season All-American Team by Soccer America and was ranked Pre-season All-Big 12 by the Big 12 Conference. She was runner-up in the most playing time on the team, totaling 1,927 minutes on the season. She led the Buffs to 10-8-4 record and another bid into the NCAA tournament She ended the season with a First Team All-Big 12 award from the Big 12 Conference.

During her junior year, Marshall was moved back up to the striker position. She was ranked Pre-season All-Big 12 by the Big 12 Conference. After another successful season, Marshall was second on the team for goals scored, with eight goals. She led her team second in the Big 12 Tournament and a bid to the NCAA Tournament. For the third year in a row, she received First Team All-Big 12 from the Big 12 Conference.

In 2009, Marshall was again ranked a Pre-season All-American by Soccer America. She was captain of the Buffaloes along with fellow senior Kara Linder. She led the Buffs in scoring with a total of eight goals on the season. She also let the team in number of shots taken, 53. She finished the season with another First Team All-Big 12 accolade.

== Club career ==
=== The WPS Years, 2010–11 ===
Marshall was the first draft pick (seventh overall) for the Washington Freedom in the 2010 WPS Draft. During the 2010 season, she started in all 24 of the team's regular season matches and scored three goals playing as a defender. The Freedom finished fourth during the regular season with an 8–7–9 record, earning a berth to the playoffs. During the playoff quarterfinals, the Freedom were defeated by the Philadelphia Independence 1–0.

Marshall remained with the club in 2011 when they relocated to Florida and became magicJack under new ownership. She played in eight games for magicJack before being traded to the Boston Breakers. She made seven appearances for the Breakers as the team finished fourth in the regular season with a 5–4–0 record. On August 17, 2011, the Breakers were defeated 3–1 by magicJack and eliminated from the playoffs.

=== Portland Thorns FC, 2013–2014 ===
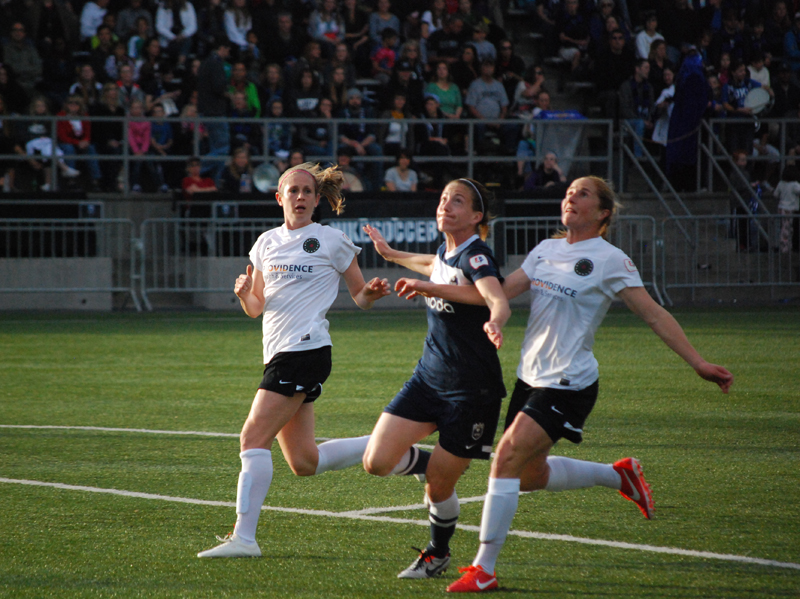
Marshall (left) and Rachel Buehler (right) of Portland Thorns FC defend against Liz Bogus (center) of Seattle Reign FC during a match on May 25, 2013 in Tukwila, Washington.

In February 2013, Marshall signed with Portland Thorns FC for the inaugural season of the National Women's Soccer League. She was on the starting lineup as a defender in all of the Thorns' 22 games as the team finished third in regular season play and received a berth to the playoffs. During the team's playoff semi-final match, Marshall served the assist to Tiffany Weimer's equalizer goal. The Thorns would eventually defeat FC Kansas City 3–2 in overtime. The Thorns defeated Western New York Flash during the playoff final clinching the league's first championship title.

Marshall was waived by the Thorns during the post-season and picked up during the waiver draft by the Washington Spirit. A few months later, she was traded to the Seattle Reign FC. In December 2013, she was traded back to the Portland Thorns. Thorns management clarified that Marshall was put on waivers due to a cap issue. With the trades, she was signed to a new contract at a different salary for the 2014 season.

During the 2014 season, Marshall started in all 24 matches for the Thorns playing for 2072 minutes. After finishing third during the regular season with a 10–8–6 record, the Thorns advanced to the playoffs where they were defeated in the semifinals 2-0 by eventual champions FC Kansas City.

In August 2014, Marshall suffered an anterior cruciate ligament (ACL) tear during a match against the Seattle Reign . She announced her retirement in February 2015, citing low pay.

== International career ==
Marshall was a member of the United States under-20 women's national soccer team that competed in the 2008 FIFA U-20 Women's World Cup in Chile. Marshall and fellow central defender Lauren Fowlkes were the only two members of that squad to start in and play every minute of all six matches of the tournament; both were praised for their poised performance as the anchors for the team's defense, especially during the final game against North Korea.

== Honors ==
Portland Thorns FC

- NWSL Championship: 2013

== See also ==
- United States at the 2007 Pan American Games
- List of University of Colorado Boulder alumni
