= Shaneka Gordon =

Jamaican footballer (born 1986)

Personal information
- Full name: Shaneka Jodian Gordon
- Date of birth: 28 May 1986 (age 40)
- Height: 1.70 m (5 ft 7 in)
- Position: Midfielder

Team information
- Current team: ÍBV
- Number: 23

College career
Years	Team	Apps	(Gls)
2007	CCBC-Catonsville		
2008–2009	West Florida Argonauts	47	(48)

Senior career*
Years	Team	Apps	(Gls)
2010–2011	Grindavík	25	(18)
2012–2018	ÍBV	66	(46)
2018	ÍR (loan)	11	(5)
2019	ÍBV	4	(0)
2021-	ÍR	0	(0)

International career^{‡}
2014	Jamaica	1	(0)
- * Club domestic league appearances and goals as of 1 April 2021 (UTC) ‡ National team caps and goals as of 21 October 2014

Shaneka Jodian Gordon (born 28 May 1986) is a Jamaican footballer who plays as a midfielder for Icelandic club ÍBV. She was a member of the Jamaica women's national team. In 2015, she received an Icelandic citizenship. After missing the 2016 and 2017 seasons due to injury she signed with ÍR for the 2018 season.

== College career ==
Gordon attended the Community College of Baltimore and the University of West Florida, both in the United States.
