= Washington Freedom Futures =

- Nickname: Freedom
- Founded: 2009
- Ground: Maryland SoccerPlex
- Capacity: 5,126
- Owner: (United States) John Hendricks
- Manager: (United States) Win Puffer
- League: W-League
Home colors	Away colors

Washington Freedom Futures was an American women's soccer team and the top-level amateur team in the Washington Freedom Soccer Club hierarchy. The team was a member of the United Soccer Leagues W-League, the second tier of women's soccer in the United States and Canada. The team plays in the Northeast Division of the Eastern Conference. The W-League team folded after the 2010 season.

The team played its home games in the stadium at Maryland SoccerPlex in Germantown, Maryland. The club's colors were blue, red and white.

The team was part of the official development system of the Washington Freedom Women's Professional Soccer franchise, one of the most successful women's soccer teams in America. The senior Freedom team originally competed in the professional Women's United Soccer Association from 2001 to 2003, then joined the W-League in 2006. Once play began in WPS, however, the senior team competed in that league, and the Freedom's reserves took their place in the second tier. In November 2009, the team name was changed from the Washington Freedom (W-League) to the Washington Freedom Futures, and Joanna Lohman was named the team's general manager.

== Players ==
=== Squad 2010 ===
As of 27 July 2009.

Note: Flags indicate national team as defined under FIFA eligibility rules; some limited exceptions apply. Players may hold more than one non-FIFA nationality.

No.	Pos.	Nation	Player
1	GK	USA	Alyssa Pont
2	MF	CAN	Jennifer Parsons
3	MF	USA	Kimmie Germain
4	DF	USA	Mara Osher
5	DF	USA	Jordon Grant
6	MF	USA	Jesstine Wolfe
7	FW	USA	Caitlin Miskel
8	FW	USA	Brittany Tegeler
9	FW	USA	Katie Watson
10	MF	USA	Christine Nairn
11	MF	USA	Sandra Matute
12	FW	USA	Katie Schoepfer
13	DF	USA	Madison Keller
14	FW	USA	Tiffany McCarty
15	FW	USA	Kara Mirarchi

No.	Pos.	Nation	Player
16	DF	USA	Julia Lancos
17	DF	CAN	Molly Allen
18	GK	GUY	Chanté Sandiford
19	MF	USA	Becky Edwards
20	DF	USA	Kika Toulouse
21	FW	USA	Meghan Lenczyk
22	FW	USA	Molly Menchel
23	DF	USA	Angelina N. Cords
24	DF	USA	Jayme Cargnoni
25	MF	USA	Kristin Bowers
26	DF	USA	Caitlin Collins
30	MF	USA	Brook Chang
32	DF	USA	Toni Pressley
40	FW	USA	Yvonne Latour
55	GK	USA	Eliza Bennett Hattan

== 2010 coaching staff ==
As of 06 April 2010.

Position	Name	Nationality
Coach	Win Puffer	American
Coach	Jim Gabarra	American
Assistant coach	Clyde Watson	American
Assistant coach	Kris Ward	American
Goalkeeper coach	Nicci Wright	Canadian

== Year-by-year ==
The following sections give a history of the Freedom in the W-League, including those years when the W-League team was the senior team to provide historical background and comparison.

Year	Division	Reg. season	Playoffs
2006	1	exhibition season	
2007	1	1st, Northeast	Champions
2008	1	1st, Northeast	Semifinalists (3rd Place)
2009	2	2nd, Northeast	Finalists (2nd Place)
2010	2	2nd, Northeast	Conference Semifinalists

=== Annual performance record ===
Year	W	L	T	Pts	GF	GA	Home	Away
2007	12	1	1	37	48	10	6-1-0	6-0-1
2008	11	1	2	35	32	7	5-1-1	6-0-1
2009	12	1	1	37	49	9	6-0-1	6-1-0
2010	10	1	1	31	39	7	6-0-0	4-1-1

== Honors ==
- USL W-League Eastern Conference Champions 2009
- USL W-League Eastern Conference Champions 2008
- USL W-League Northeast Division Champions 2008
- USL W-League Champions 2007
- USL W-League Eastern Conference Champions 2007
- USL W-League Northeast Division Champions 2007
