= Colorado Rapids Women =

American women's soccer team

- Full name: Colorado Rapids Women
- Founded: 1996
- Stadium: Stermole Soccer Stadium
- Chairman: Aaron Nagel
- Coach: Andrew Kummer
- League: Women's Premier Soccer League
- 2019: 2nd, Mountain Conference; Playoffs: DNQ

Colorado Rapids Women is an American women's soccer team, founded in 1996. The team is a member of the women's premier soccer league and plays in the Central Conference's Mountain Region. The team was a member of the United Soccer Leagues W-League, the second highest tier of women's soccer in the United States and Canada. The team played in the Western Conference against the Colorado Rush, LA Strikers, Pali Blues, Santa Clarita Blue Heat, Seattle Sounders Women, and Bay Area Breeze.

The team played its home games at Stermole Soccer Stadium in the city of Golden, Colorado. The club's colors are Burgundy, Sky Blue, and White.

On July 23, 2012 the Colorado Rapids Women won the North American USL Super20 League championship staged at the IMG Academy in Bradenton, Florida. They defeated D.C. United Super20 1-0 in the Final crowning the Rapids Super20 North American Champions for 2012.

In their inaugural 2019 WPSL Season, the Rapids Women placed 2nd in the Central Region's Mountain Conference with a record of 8-2-0.

== Players ==
=== Current roster ===
(As of July 2019)
Note: Flags indicate national team as defined under FIFA eligibility rules; some limited exceptions apply. Players may hold more than one non-FIFA nationality.

No.	Pos.	Nation	Player
00	GK	USA	MacKenzie Egan
1	GK	USA	Brittany Wilson
6	FW	USA	Natalie Beckman
7	DF	USA	Gabrielle Miranda
8	FW	USA	Abby Gearhart
9	FW	USA	Alesia Garcia
10	MF	USA	Coriana Dyke
14	DF	USA	Morgan Kennedy
15	FW	USA	Shalom Prince
16	MF	USA	Jessie Hix

No.	Pos.	Nation	Player
20	DF	USA	Skylar Anderson
21	MF	USA	Fran Garzelloni
22	DF	USA	Carolyn Anschutz
23	DF	USA	Myah Isais
25	DF	USA	Mari Annest
26	FW	USA	Mallory Mooney
28	DF	USA	Keelie Wortmann
29	FW	USA	Civana Kuhlmann

== Coaching staff ==
Position	Staff
Head Coach	(United States) Andrew Kummer
Assistant Coach	(United States) Peter May
Goalkeeper Coach	(United States) Jeff Oleck

Last updated: May 11, 2013

== Previous head coaches ==
(Australia) Daniel Clitnovici (2012-2014)

== Year-by-year ==
Year	Division	League	Reg. season	Playoffs
2003	2	USL W-League	5th, Western	
2004	1	USL W-League	8th, Western	
2005	1	USL W-League	6th, Western	
2006	1	USL W-League	5th, Western	
2007	1	USL W-League	5th, Western	
2008	1	USL W-League	6th, Western	Did not qualify
2009	1	USL W-League	7th, Western	Did not qualify
2010	1	USL W-League	6th, Western	Did not qualify
2011	1	USL W-League	7th, Western	Did not qualify
2012	1	USL W-League	4th, Western	Did not qualify
2013	1	USL W-League	4th, Western	Did not qualify
2019	1	WPSL	N/A	N/A
