= Tampa Bay Hellenic =

- Full name: Tampa Bay Hellenic
- Nickname: Hellenic
- Founded: 2008
- Stadium: Ed Radice Sports Complex
- Capacity: ????
- Chairman: (United States) Amanda Miller
- Manager: (United States) George Fotopoulos
- League: Women's Premier Soccer League
- 2012: 1st, South - Sunshine
Home colours	Away colours

Tampa Bay Hellenic are an American women's soccer team based in Tampa, Florida. Established in 2008, they currently play in the Women's Premier Soccer League (WPSL). They play their home games at the Ed Radice Sports Complex. Their colors are white, red and black.

== History ==
The team was founded in 2008, and initially played in Atlantic Division of the United Soccer Leagues W-League at the second tier of women's soccer in the United States and Canada. They played in the W-League for three seasons, from 2008 to 2010, and moved to the Women's Premier Soccer League (WPSL) the following season. After the 2012 season, Hellenic merged with another local women's team, VSI Tampa Bay FC, of the W-League. When the VSI organization folded at the end of 2013, Tampa Bay Hellenic returned to the WPSL. In 2014, the club won the WPSL's Sunshine Division title for the third time.

== Year-by-year ==
Year	Division	League	Reg. season	Playoffs
2008	2	USL W-League	3rd, Eastern - Atlantic	Did not qualify
2009	2	USL W-League	2nd, Eastern - Atlantic	Eastern Semifinal
2010	2	USL W-League	3rd, Eastern - Atlantic	Did not qualify
2011	2	WPSL	1st, South - Sunshine	WPSL Semifinal
2012	2	WPSL	1st, South - Sunshine	Sunshine playoffs cancelled
2014	2	WPSL	1st, South - Sunshine	South Semifinal
