= Hudson Valley Quickstrike Lady Blues =

- Full name: Hudson Valley Quickstrike Lady Blues
- Nickname: The Blues
- Founded: 2006
- Ground: Newburgh Free Academy HS Stadium
- Chairman: Thomas Hofstetter
- Manager: Jesse Kolmel
- League: USL W-League
Home colors	Away colors

Hudson Valley Quickstrike Lady Blues was an American women's soccer team, founded in 2006. The team was a member of the United Soccer Leagues W-League, the second tier of women's soccer in the United States and Canada. The team played in the Northeast Division of the Eastern Conference. The team folded after the 2010 season

The team played its home games in the stadium on the campus of Newburgh Free Academy High School in the city of Newburgh, New York, 65 miles north of New York City. The club's colors was sky blue, dark blue, black and white.

The Lady Blues was part of the larger Sky Blue Soccer organization, based in Bedminster, New Jersey, an integrated program that allows players to progress in soccer from a young age with an opportunity for long-term growth. Prior to the 2009 season they were known as the Jersey Sky Blues.

Following the formation of Women's Professional Soccer in 2009, the team served as a feeder program for the New York/New Jersey franchise Sky Blue FC. The Sky Blue FC play at Yurcak Field on the campus of Rutgers University.

== Players ==
=== Squad 2009 ===
Note: Flags indicate national team as defined under FIFA eligibility rules; some limited exceptions apply. Players may hold more than one non-FIFA nationality.

No.	Pos.	Nation	Player
2	FW	USA	Marisa Brown
3	DF	POR	Kim Brandão
4	MF	USA	Erica Stewart
5	DF	USA	Sarra Moller
6	DF	USA	Bonnie Young
7	MF	USA	Gina DiMaio
8	DF	USA	Stephanie Peel
9	MF	AUS	Stacey Stocco
10	MF	CAN	Leah Robinson
11	DF	USA	Jaime Komar
12	FW	CAN	Amélie Mercier
13	DF	USA	Lauren Ebert
14	MF	USA	Taylor Walsh
15	FW	USA	Aubrey Aiden-Buie

No.	Pos.	Nation	Player
16	MF	USA	Ashlyn Brantley
17	MF	USA	Tricia DiPaolo
20	DF	USA	Kelly Eagan
21	MF	USA	Domenique Esposito
22	MF	USA	Lisa Chinn
23	FW	USA	Christy Zwolski
25	GK	AUS	Dimitra Poulos
26	MF	IRL	Michele O'Brien
27	DF	USA	Alexandra Hambleton
28	FW	COL	Daniela Molina
29	FW	USA	Kim Bonilla
31	MF	USA	Carolyn Blank
99	MF	SWE	Yolanda Odenyo

=== Notable former players ===
The following former players have played at the senior international and/or professional level:

- (Portugal) Kimberly Brandão
- (Brazil) Formiga
- (United States) Tobin Heath
- (United States) Nikki Krzysik
- (United States) Jillian Loyden
- (Canada) Melissa Tancredi
- (Switzerland) Lara Dickenmann

== Year-by-year ==
Year	Division	League	Reg. season	Playoffs
Jersey Sky Blue
2007	1	USL W-League	2nd, Northeast	Conference Semifinals
2008	1	USL W-League	4th, Northeast	Did not qualify
Hudson Valley Quickstrike Lady Blues
2009	2	USL W-League	1st, Northeast	National Semifinals
2010	2	USL W-League	1st, Northeast	3rd Place Game

== Coaches ==
- (United States) Denise Reddy 2007–2008
- (United States) Jesse Kolmel 2008–2010

== Stadium ==
- Ranger Stadium, Madison, New Jersey 2008–2010
