= WPS records and statistics =

Women's Professional Soccer (WPS) was an American professional women's soccer league that operated as the top division of women's soccer in the United States. The league was formed in 2008 and dissolved in 2012. Below are notable records and statistics for WPS teams, players, and seasons, all as of the end of the league's final season in 2011.

== WPS champions and runners-up ==
Season	Playoff winner	Result	Playoff runner-up	Regular season winner	Points	Regular season runner-up
2009	Sky Blue FC	1–0; Home Depot Center	Los Angeles Sol	Los Angeles Sol	41–34	Saint Louis Athletica
2010	FC Gold Pride	4–0; Pioneer Stadium	Philadelphia Independence	FC Gold Pride	53-36	Boston Breakers
2011	Western New York Flash	1–1 (a.e.t.); 5–4 (pen.); Sahlen's Stadium	Philadelphia Independence	Western New York Flash	42–36	Philadelphia Independence

== Career leaders ==
WPS career leading regular-season goalscorers
Player	Goals
(Brazil) Marta	39
(United States) Abby Wambach	30
(Canada) Christine Sinclair	26
(United States) Natasha Kai	20
(England) Eniola Aluko	19
(England) Kelly Smith	18
(United States) Amy Rodriguez	15
(United States) Ella Masar	12
(Brazil) Cristiane	10
(Australia) Lisa De Vanna	10
(United States) Tiffany Milbrett	10
(United States) Kelley O'Hara	10

WPS career leading playoff goalscorers
Player	Goals
(United States) Amy Rodriguez	3
(Canada) Christine Sinclair	3
(United States) Natasha Kai	2
(United States) Abby Wambach	2
(United States) Danesha Adams	1
(United States) Lauren Cheney	1
(Australia) Lisa De Vanna	1
(United States) Keeley Dowling	1
(Brazil) Francielle	1
(Brazil) Marta	1
(United States) Heather O'Reilly	1
(United States) Megan Rapinoe	1
(Sweden) Caroline Seger	1
(United States) Keelin Winters	1

== All-time table ==
All-time final season positions on WPS regular-season standings
Club	1st	2nd	3rd	4th
Western New York Flash	1	0	0	0
FC Gold Pride	1	0	0	0
Los Angeles Sol	1	0	0	0
Philadelphia Independence	0	1	1	0
Boston Breakers	0	1	0	1
Saint Louis Athletica	0	1	0	0
Washington Freedom	0	0	1	1
magicJack	0	0	1	0
Sky Blue FC	0	0	0	1

All-time final WPS playoff results
Club	1st	2nd	3rd	4th
Western New York Flash	1	0	0	0
FC Gold Pride	1	0	0	0
Sky Blue FC	1	0	0	0
Philadelphia Independence	0	2	0	0
Los Angeles Sol	0	1	0	0
Boston Breakers	0	0	1	1
magicJack	0	0	1	0
Saint Louis Athletica	0	0	1	0
Washington Freedom	0	0	0	2

Sort order: For otherwise identical records, the most recent success is listed first.

All-time WPS standings
Club	Seasons	GP	W	L	T	GF	GA	GD	Pts	PPG	Finishing position			
Club	Seasons	GP	W	L	T	GF	GA	GD	Pts	PPG	1st	2nd	3rd	4th
Boston Breakers	3 (2009–2011)	62	22	26	14	73	72	+1	80	1.290	0	1	0	1
Sky Blue FC	3 (2009–2011)	62	19	27	16	63	80	–17	73	1.177	0	0	0	1
FC Gold Pride	2 (2009–2010)	44	20	13	11	63	47	+16	71	1.614	1	0	0	0
Philadelphia Independence	2 (2010–2011)	42	21	14	7	68	54	+14	70	1.667	0	1	1	0
Washington Freedom	2 (2009–2010)	44	16	16	12	65	65	0	60	1.354	0	0	1	1
Chicago Red Stars	2 (2009–2010)	44	12	21	11	36	52	–13	47	1.068	0	0	0	0
Saint Louis Athletica	2 (2009–2010)	26	12	7	7	28	23	+5	43	1.654	0	1	0	0
Western New York Flash	1 (2011)	18	13	2	3	40	18	+22	42	2.333	1	0	0	0
Los Angeles Sol	1 (2009)	20	12	3	5	27	10	+17	41	2.050	1	0	0	0
magicJack	1 (2011)	18	9	7	2	29	29	0	28 (Note: Includes point deductions.)	1.556	0	0	1	0
Atlanta Beat	2 (2010–2011)	42	6	26	10	27	72	–45	28	0.667	0	0	0	0

All-time WPS playoff records
Club	Seas.	Apps.	App%	GP	W	L	T	SOW	GF	GA	GD	Pts	PPG										
Philadelphia Independence	2	2	100.00%	GP	W	L	T	SOW	GF	GA	GD	Pts	PPG	5	3	1	1	0	6	6	0	10	2.00
Sky Blue FC	1	3	33.33%	3	3	0	0	0	4	1	+3	9	3.00										
magicJack	1	1	100.00%	2	1	1	0	0	3	3	0	3	1.50										
FC Gold Pride	1	2	50.00%	1	1	0	0	0	4	0	+4	3	3.00										
Western New York Flash	1	1	100.00%	1	0	0	1	1	1	1	0	1	1.00										
Washington Freedom	2	2	100.00%	2	0	2	0	0	1	3	–2	0	0.00										
Los Angeles Sol	1	1	100.00%	1	0	1	0	0	0	1	–1	0	0.00										
Saint Louis Athletica	1	1	100.00%	1	0	1	0	0	0	1	–1	0	0.00										
Boston Breakers	2	3	66.66%	2	0	2	0	0	2	5	–3	0	0.00										

Sort order: Points, appearance percentage, total seasons played, finishing position.

== Average season attendances ==
Season	League average	Highest		Lowest	
Season	League average	Club	Average	Club	Average
2009	4,709	Los Angeles Sol	6,382	Sky Blue FC	3,651
2010	3,606	Chicago Red Stars	4,350	Philadelphia Independence	2,922
2011	3,654	Western New York Flash	5,438	magicJack	2,127

Criteria: Includes regular-season, playoff, and All-Star games, but does not include friendlies.

== Records ==
- Longest winning streak to start a season: 3 wins
  - Los Angeles Sol (2009)
  - magicJack (2011)
- Longest winning streak to end a season: 5, Western New York Flash (2011)
- Longest unbeaten streak to start a season: 8, Western New York Flash (2011; 7W, 1T)
- Longest unbeaten streak to end a season: 13, FC Gold Pride (2010; 9W, 4T)

== Trivia ==
- No team played in every playoff series.
  - If magicJack is considered to be the continuation of the Washington Freedom, that team qualified for every playoff series.
  - Two core groups of players have played together in all three seasons and qualified for the playoffs:
    - Freedom-magicJack, centered on Abby Wambach
    - Sol-Gold Pride-Flash, centered on Marta
- The team to win the regular season in each of the league's first two seasons, which were also the league's attendance leaders, folded during the following offseason.

== See also ==
- Annual Women's Professional Soccer awards
- List of Women's Professional Soccer stadiums
- List of WPS drafts
- List of non-American WPS players
