= List of foreign WPS players =

This is a list of foreign players who played in Women's Professional Soccer, a women's soccer league in the United States that ran from 2009–11. The following players

- have been on the roster for the WPS club(s) listed, not counting preseason.
- have not been capped by the U.S. national team on any level/have been capped by a team other than the U.S. national team.
- were born outside the U.S./have citizenship outside the U.S.

== Australia ==
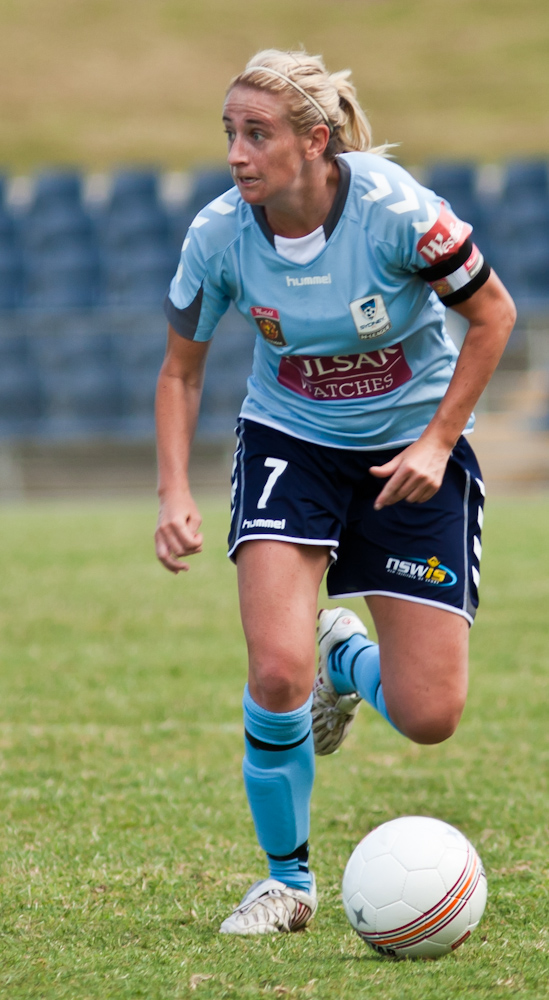
Heather Garriock

- Collette McCallum — Sky Blue FC (2009)
- Lisa De Vanna – Washington Freedom (2009–10) – magicJack (2011)
- Heather Garriock – Chicago Red Stars (2009)
- Sarah Walsh – Saint Louis Athletica (2009)

== Brazil ==
- Adriane – FC Gold Pride (2009)
- Cristiane – Chicago Red Stars (2009–10)
- Daniela – Saint Louis Athletica (2009)
- Elaine – Saint Louis Athletica (2010)
- Érika – FC Gold Pride (2009)
- Fabiana – Boston Breakers (2009–10)
- Formiga – FC Gold Pride (2009) – Chicago Red Stars (2010)
- Francielle – Saint Louis Athletica (2009) – Sky Blue FC (2009)
- Marta – Los Angeles Sol (2009) – FC Gold Pride (2010) – Western New York Flash (2011)
- Maurine – Western New York Flash (2011)
- Rosana – Sky Blue FC (2009–10)
- Sissi – FC Gold Pride (2009)

== Canada ==
- Candace Chapman – Boston Breakers (2009) – FC Gold Pride (2010) – Western New York Flash (2011)
- Martina Franko – Los Angeles Sol (2009)
- Christine Latham – Boston Breakers (2009)
- Karina LeBlanc – Los Angeles Sol (2009) – Philadelphia Independence (2010) – Chicago Red Stars (2010) – magicJack (2011)
- Erin McLeod – Washington Freedom (2009–10)
- Sharolta Nonen – Los Angeles Sol (2009) – Atlanta Beat (2010)
- Kelly Parker – Sky Blue FC (2009, 2010) – Western New York Flash (2011) – Atlanta Beat (2011)
- Sophie Schmidt – magicJack (2011)
- Lauren Sesselmann – Sky Blue FC (2009) – Atlanta Beat (2010–11)
- Christine Sinclair – FC Gold Pride (2009–10) – Western New York Flash (2011)
- Melissa Tancredi – Saint Louis Athletica (2009)

== China ==
- Han Duan – Los Angeles Sol (2009)

== Denmark ==
- Johanna Rasmussen — Atlanta Beat (2010) — magicJack (2011)

== England ==
- Eniola Aluko – Saint Louis Athletica (2009–10) – Atlanta Beat (2010) – Sky Blue FC (2011)
- Anita Asante – Sky Blue FC (2009, 2011) – Saint Louis Athletica (2010) – Chicago Red Stars (2010) – Washington Freedom (2010)
- Karen Carney – Chicago Red Stars (2009–10)
- Katie Chapman — Chicago Red Stars (2010)
- Gemma Davison – Western New York Flash (2011)
- Lianne Sanderson – Philadelphia Independence (2010–11)
- Alex Scott – Boston Breakers (2009–11)
- Kelly Smith – Boston Breakers (2009–11)
- Karen Bardsley — Sky Blue FC (2009–11)

== Finland ==
- Laura Kalmari – Sky Blue FC (2010–11)

== France ==
- Camille Abily – Los Angeles Sol (2009–10) – FC Gold Pride (2010)
- Sonia Bompastor – Washington Freedom (2009–10)

== Germany ==
- Shelley Thompson — Atlanta Beat (2010)

== Iceland ==
- Hólmfríður Magnúsdóttir – Philadelphia Independence (2010–11)

== Italy ==
- Patrizia Panico — Sky Blue FC (2010)

== Jamaica ==
- Omolyn Davis – magicJack (2011)

== Japan ==
- Eriko Arakawa – FC Gold Pride (2009)
- Aya Miyama – Los Angeles Sol (2009) – Saint Louis Athletica (2010) – Atlanta Beat (2010)
- Homare Sawa — Washington Freedom (2009–10)
- Mami Yamaguchi — Atlanta Beat (2010)

== Mexico ==
- Mónica Ocampo — Atlanta Beat (2010)
- Verónica Pérez – Saint Louis Athletica (2010)

== Netherlands ==
- Daphne Koster — Sky Blue FC (2010)
- Petra Hogewoning – Sky Blue FC (2011)

== New Zealand ==
- Ali Riley – FC Gold Pride (2010) – Western New York Flash (2011)

== Norway ==
- Lene Mykjåland – Washington Freedom (2010)
- Solveig Gulbrandsen — FC Gold Pride (2010)

== Portugal ==
- Kimberly Brandão – Western New York Flash (2011)

== Spain ==
- Verónica Boquete – Chicago Red Stars (2010) – Philadelphia Independence (2011)
- Laura del Río – Boston Breakers (2010) – Philadelphia Independence (2011)
- Adriana Martín – Sky Blue FC (2011)

== Sweden ==
- Madelaine Edlund – Saint Louis Athletica (2010)
- Johanna Frisk – Los Angeles Sol (2009)
- Caroline Jönsson – Chicago Red Stars (2009)
- Sara Larsson – Saint Louis Athletica (2009) – Philadelphia Independence (2010)
- Frida Östberg – Chicago Red Stars (2009)
- Kosovare Asllani — Chicago Red Stars (2010)
- Jessica Landstrom — Sky Blue FC (2010)
- Caroline Seger – Philadelphia Independence (2010) — Western New York Flash (2011)
- Therese Sjögran – Sky Blue FC (2011)

== Switzerland ==
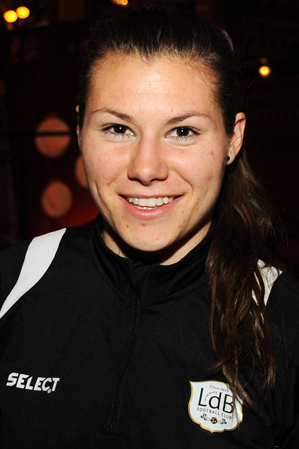
Ramona Bachmann

- Ramona Bachmann – Atlanta Beat (2010)

== See also ==
- WPS records and statistics
- List of Boston Breakers players
- List of Chicago Red Stars players
- List of FC Gold Pride players
