= 2010 WPS expansion draft =

Draft for the WPS

The 2010 WPS Expansion Draft was a special draft for the Women's Professional Soccer (WPS) expansion team Western New York Flash that took place on November 20, 2010. The Flash had the opportunity to make nine player selections from the existing seven WPS teams.

== Format ==
- Existing teams may protect up to 10 players, but must leave a minimum of 3 unprotected. (Free agents are not included in either category.)
- Expansion team must each select one player from each existing team prior to selecting a second player from an existing team.
- Existing team may protect one additional player after losing their first player.
- Existing team may protect all players after losing their second player.
- An existing team may not lose more than two players.
- Expansion team may select a total of nine players.

== Expansion Draft Results ==
#	Team	Player	Previous Team
1	Western New York Flash	(United States) Kaley Fountain (D)	Atlanta Beat
2	Western New York Flash	(United States) Beverly Goebel (M)	Washington Freedom
3	Western New York Flash	pass	end draft

== See also ==
- List of WPS drafts
- 2011 WPS season
