= Soccer-specific stadium =

Type of sports stadium

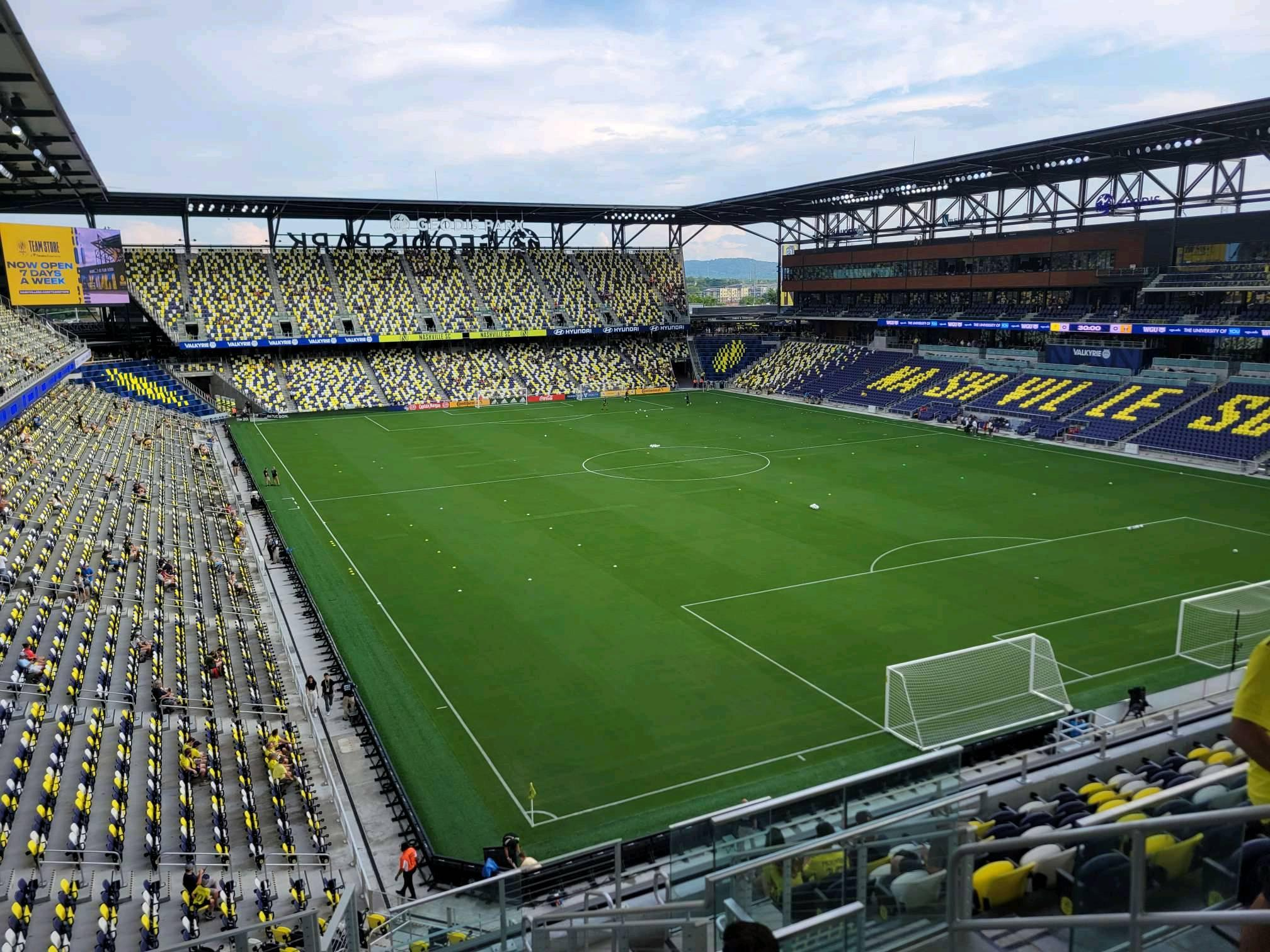
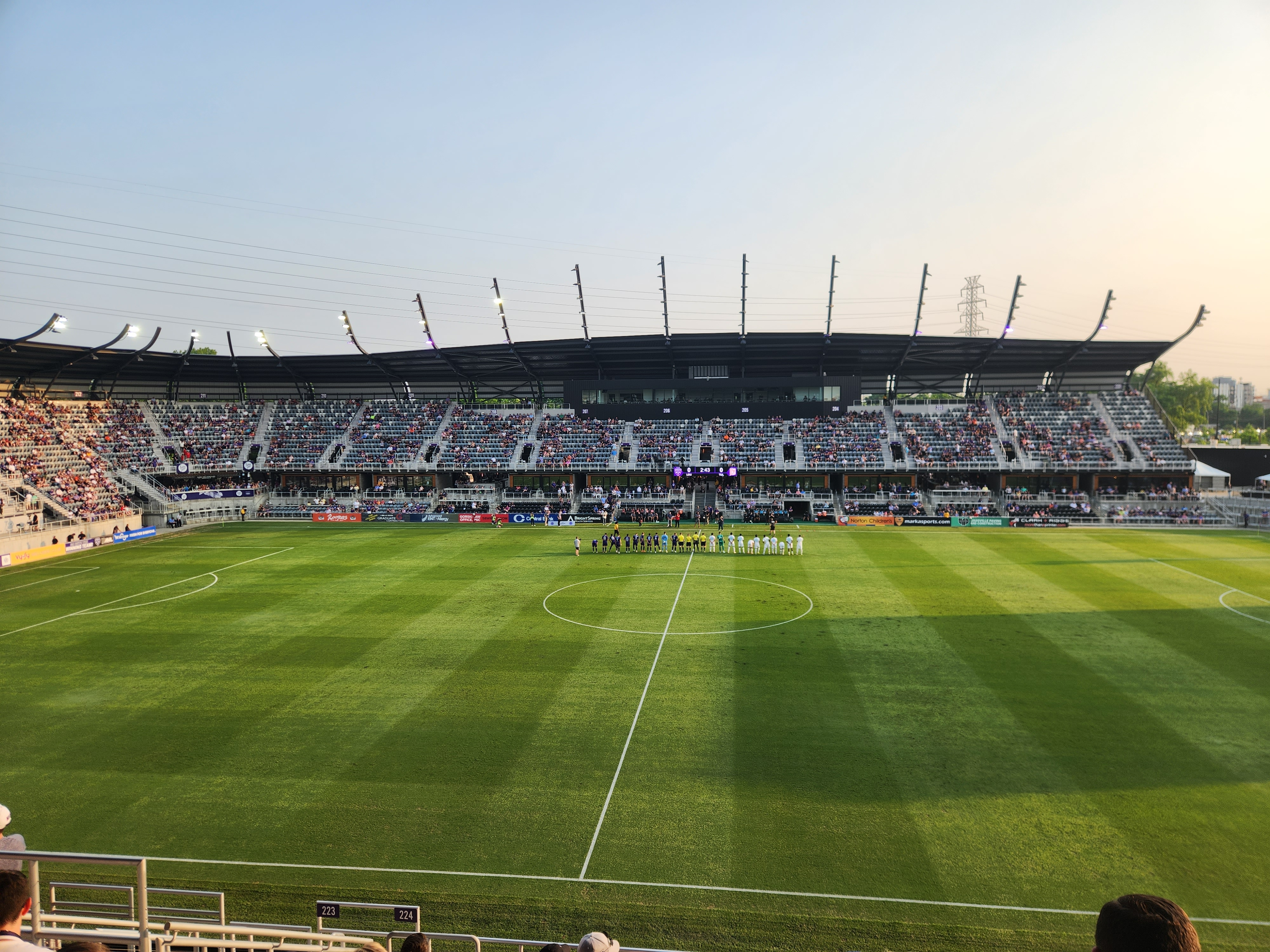
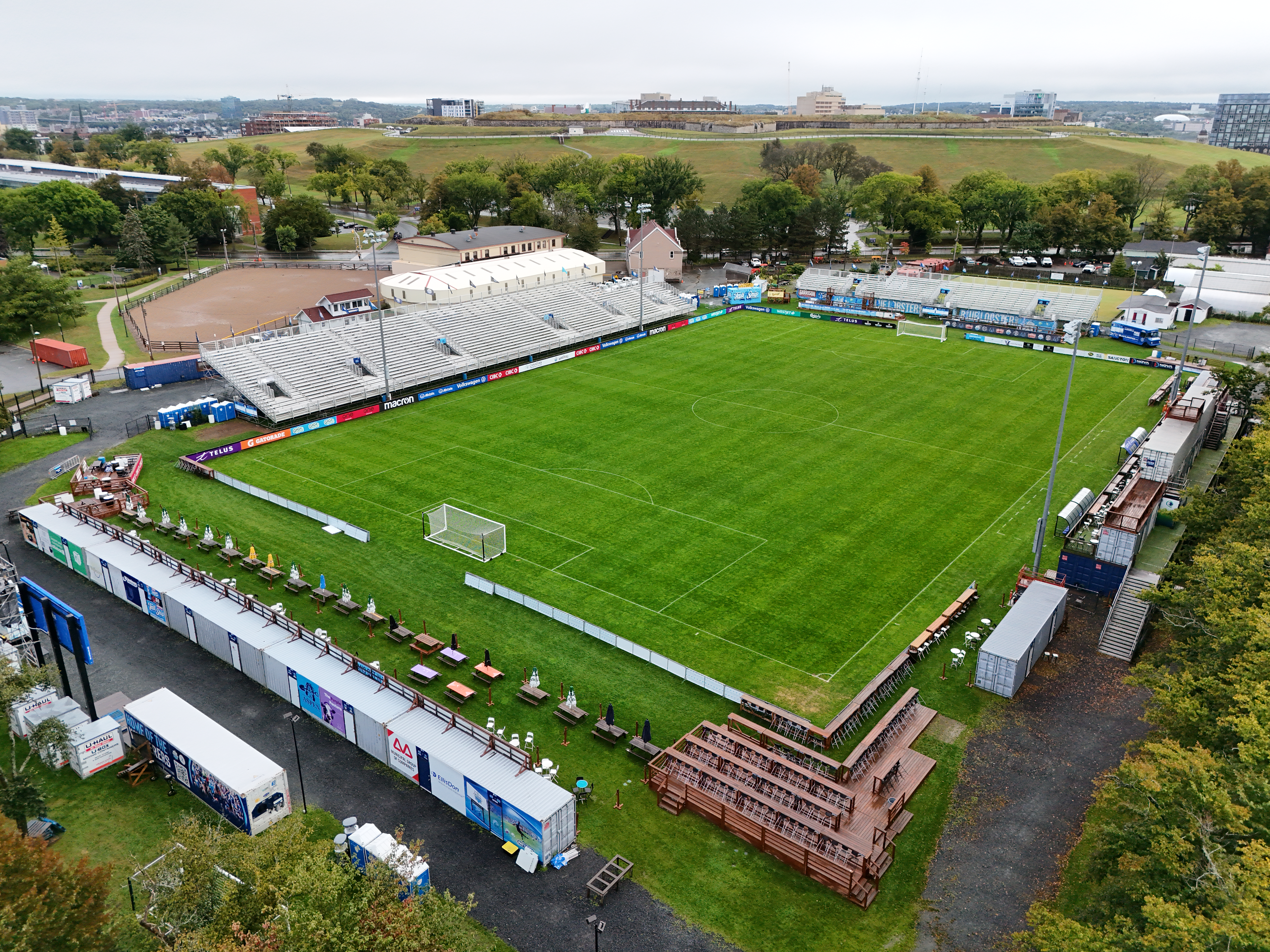
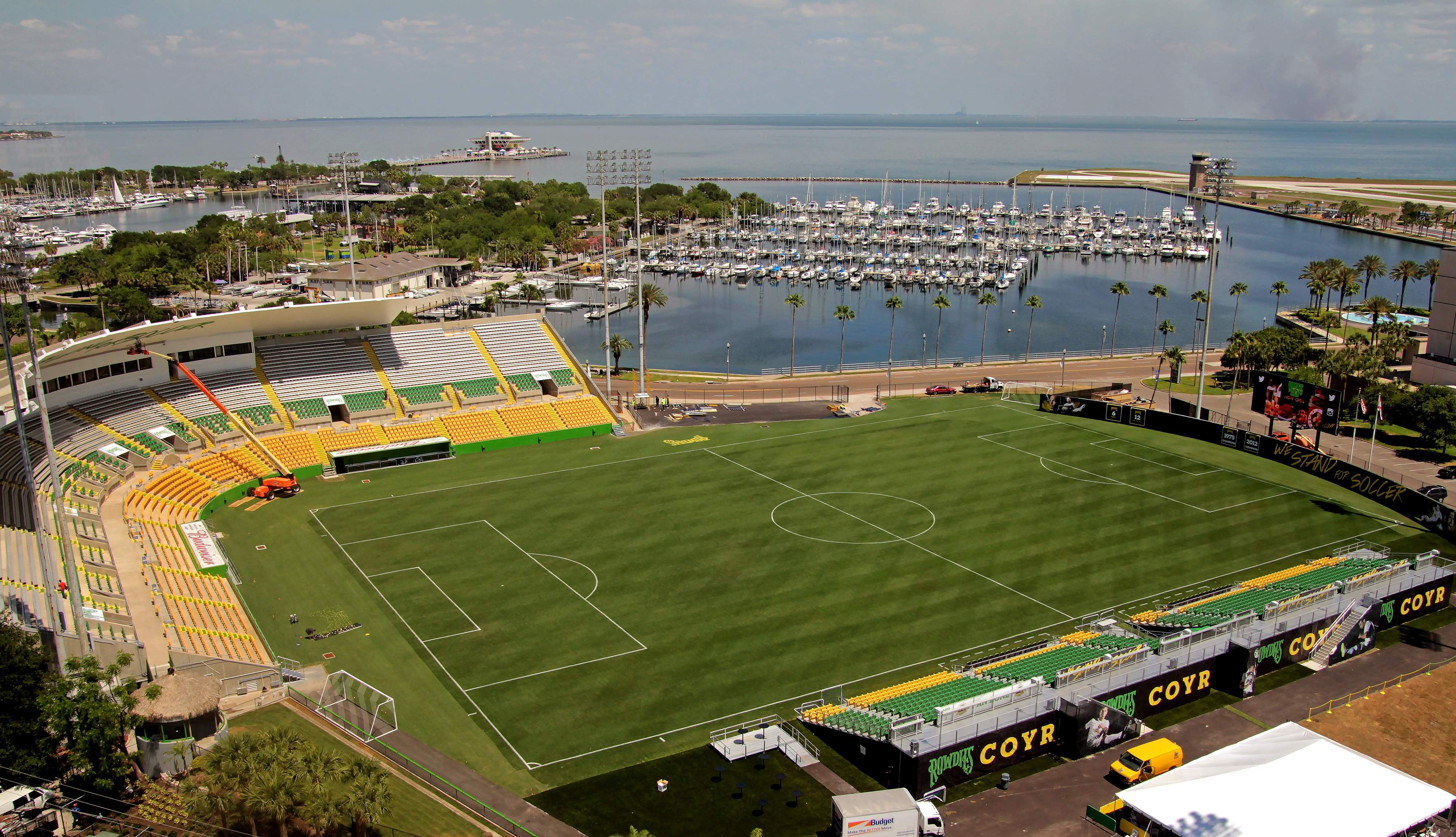
Types of soccer-specific stadiums in North America (left–right, top–bottom): large stadiums (Geodis Park), smaller "boutique" stadiums (Lynn Family Stadium), "modular" stadiums with bleachers (Wanderers Grounds), and converted former ballparks (Al Lang Stadium).

A soccer-specific stadium, mainly in the United States and Canada, is a sports stadium either purpose-built or fundamentally redesigned for soccer and whose primary function is to host soccer matches, as opposed to a multi-purpose stadium which is for a variety of sports. A soccer-specific stadium may host other sporting events (such as lacrosse, American football and rugby) and concerts, but the design and purpose of a soccer-specific stadium is primarily for soccer. Some facilities (for example SeatGeek Stadium, Toyota Stadium and Historic Crew Stadium) have a permanent stage at one end of the stadium used for staging concerts.

A soccer-specific stadium typically has amenities, dimensions and scale suitable for soccer in North America, including a scoreboard, video screen, luxury suites and possibly a roof. The field dimensions are within the range found optimal by FIFA: 110–120 yards (100–110 m) long by 70–80 yards (64–75 m) wide. These soccer field dimensions are wider than the regulation American football field width of 53 1/3 yards (48.8 m), or the 65-yard (59 m) width of a Canadian football field. The playing surface typically consists of grass as opposed to artificial turf, as the latter is generally disfavored for soccer matches since players are more susceptible to injuries. However, some soccer-specific stadiums, such as Portland's Providence Park and Creighton University's Morrison Stadium, do have artificial turf.

The seating capacity is generally between 18,000 and 30,000 for a Major League Soccer franchise, or smaller for college or minor league soccer teams. This is in comparison to the much larger American football stadiums that mostly range between 60,000 and 80,000 in which the original North American Soccer League teams played and most MLS teams occupied during the league's inception. As opposed to gridiron-style football stadiums, where the front row of seats is elevated several feet above the field of play to allow spectators to see over the heads of substitute players and coaches on the sidelines, soccer-specific venues typically have the front row closer to the level of the pitch.

== History ==
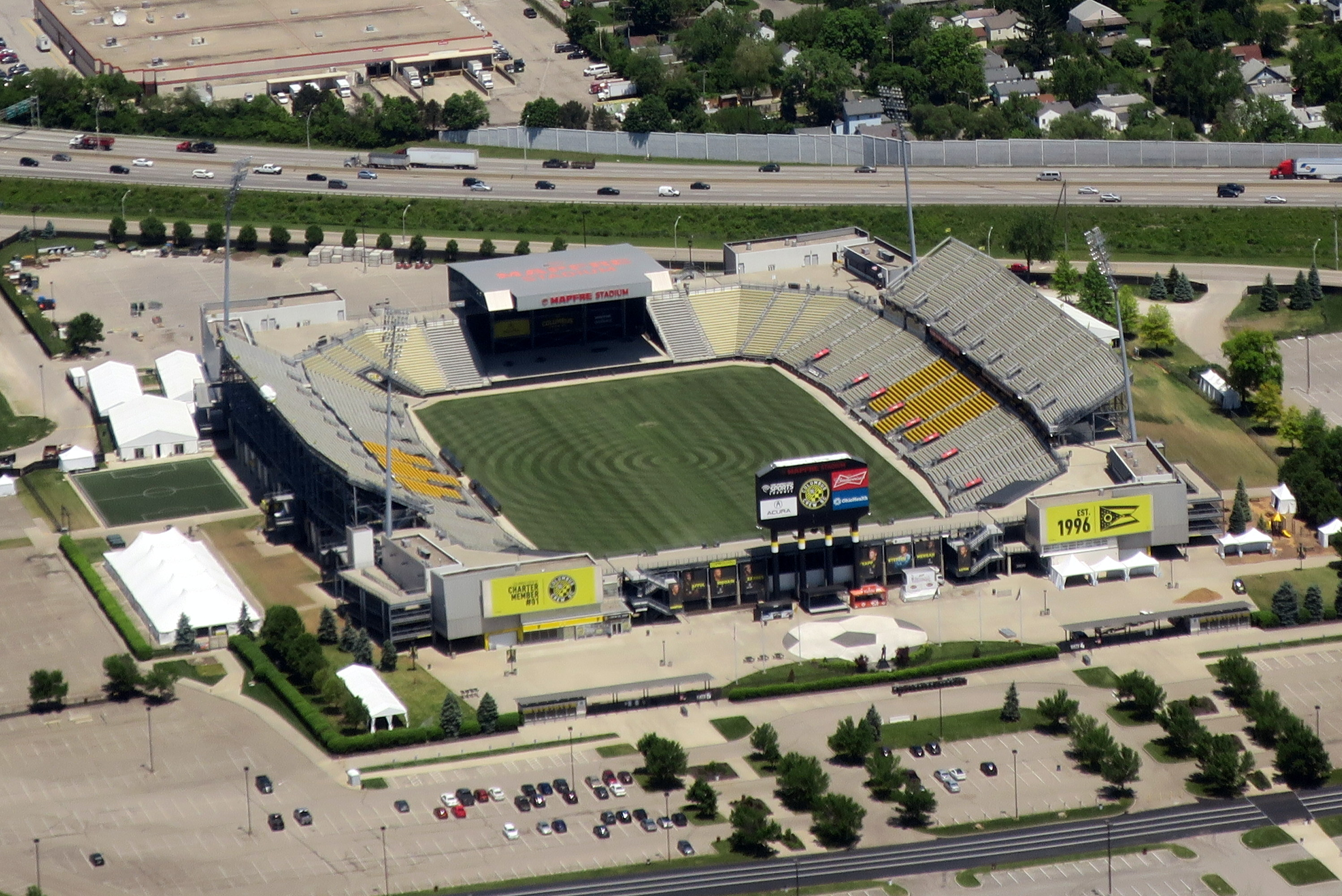
Columbus Crew Stadium (now Historic Crew Stadium) was the first soccer-specific stadium in MLS.

In the 1970s, 1980s and 1990s, first-division professional soccer leagues in the United States, such as the North American Soccer League and Major League Soccer, primarily used American football stadiums, many of which were oversized in terms of seating capacity and undersized in terms of the width of the soccer field; they often used artificial turf (none of which, at the time, were approved for international soccer under FIFA rules). Although many of the baseball parks had smaller capacities, natural grass, and a wider field, these parks were generally in use during summer, when North American–based soccer leagues, such as Major League Soccer, also hold their seasons, and the irregular field dimensions and sightlines were often considered undesirable.

Soccer-specific stadiums first came into use in the 1990s, after the multi-purpose stadium era.

The term "soccer-specific stadium" was coined by Lamar Hunt, who financed the construction of Columbus Crew Stadium, the first soccer-specific stadium constructed specifically for Major League Soccer. In the 2000s, other Major League Soccer teams in the United States began constructing their own stadiums. Canada's first soccer-specific stadium was BMO Field in Toronto, home to Toronto FC. This stadium was renovated to accommodate Canadian football for the 2016 and subsequent seasons. The distinction is less prominent in Canada, where MLS's attendance figures are comparable to those of the domestic Canadian Football League, and the CFL's wider field means fewer compromises must be made to accommodate both; Tim Hortons Field was built purposely to both soccer specifications and CFL regulations. Of the three Canadian cities that host both MLS and CFL teams, only one (Montreal) has separate stadiums for each.

== Major League Soccer (MLS) ==
=== Current MLS soccer-specific stadiums ===
Stadium	Club(s)	City	Capacity	Opened
Allianz Field	Minnesota United FC	Saint Paul, Minnesota	19,400	2019
America First Field	Real Salt Lake	Sandy, Utah	20,213	2008
Audi Field	D.C. United	Washington, D.C.	20,000	2018
BMO Field	Toronto FC	Toronto, Ontario	28,180	2007
BMO Stadium	Los Angeles FC	Los Angeles, California	22,000	2018
Sporting Park	Sporting Kansas City	Kansas City, Kansas	18,467	2011
Energizer Park	St. Louis City SC	St. Louis, Missouri	22,423	2022
Dick's Sporting Goods Park	Colorado Rapids	Commerce City, Colorado	18,061	2007
Dignity Health Sports Park	LA Galaxy	Carson, California	27,000	2003
Inter.co Stadium	Orlando City SC	Orlando, Florida	25,500	2017
Nu Stadium	Inter Miami CF	Miami, Florida	26,700	2026
Geodis Park	Nashville SC	Nashville, Tennessee	30,109	2022
PayPal Park	San Jose Earthquakes	San Jose, California	18,000	2015
ScottsMiracle-Gro Field	Columbus Crew	Columbus, Ohio	20,371	2021
Shell Energy Stadium	Houston Dynamo FC	Houston, Texas	20,656	2012
Providence Park	Portland Timbers	Portland, Oregon	25,218	1926 (Note: Was made soccer-specific following renovations in 2011. Previously used for football and baseball.)
Q2 Stadium	Austin FC	Austin, Texas	20,500	2021
Saputo Stadium	CF Montréal	Montreal, Quebec	19,619	2008
Sports Illustrated Stadium	New York Red Bulls	Harrison, New Jersey	25,000	2010
Subaru Park	Philadelphia Union	Chester, Pennsylvania	18,500	2010
Toyota Stadium	FC Dallas	Frisco, Texas	11,000	2005
TQL Stadium	FC Cincinnati	Cincinnati, Ohio	26,000	2021

=== Under construction ===
Stadium	Club(s)	City	Proposed capacity	Potential opening date
Etihad Park	New York City FC	New York City, New York	25,000	2027
McDonald's Park	Chicago Fire FC	Chicago, Illinois	22,000	2028

=== Proposed MLS soccer-specific stadiums ===
Stadium	Club(s)	City	Proposed capacity
Future New England Revolution Stadium	New England Revolution	Everett, Massachusetts	24,000

== National Women's Soccer League (NWSL) ==
=== Current NWSL soccer-specific stadiums ===
Stadium	Club(s)	City	Capacity	Opened
Audi Field	Washington Spirit	Washington, D.C.	20,000	2018
BMO Stadium	Angel City FC	Los Angeles, California	22,000	2018
CPKC Stadium	Kansas City Current	Kansas City, Missouri	11,500	2024
Inter.co Stadium	Orlando Pride	Orlando, Florida	25,500	2017
Lynn Family Stadium	Racing Louisville FC	Louisville, Kentucky	11,700	2021
Shell Energy Stadium	Houston Dash	Houston, Texas	22,039	2012
Providence Park	Portland Thorns FC	Portland, Oregon	25,218	2011
SeatGeek Stadium	Chicago Red Stars	Bridgeview, Illinois	20,000	2006
Sports Illustrated Stadium	NJ/NY Gotham FC	Harrison, New Jersey	25,000	2010
WakeMed Soccer Park	North Carolina Courage	Cary, North Carolina	10,000	2002

== United Soccer League (USL) ==
=== Current USL Pro soccer-specific stadiums ===
All USL Championship teams and USL League One teams have been required to play in self-owned, soccer-specific stadiums by the 2025 season. The following is a list of current USL stadiums, including the women's professional league USL Super League, that are soccer-specific stadiums:

Stadium	Club(s)	City	Capacity	Opened
Al Lang Stadium	Tampa Bay Rowdies	St. Petersburg, Florida	7,227	1947 (2015 renovation) (Note: Almost exclusively as a baseball park for over 60 years. However, since the Rowdies moved to the facility in 2011, it has been reconfigured to better host soccer.)
American Legion Memorial Stadium	Carolina Ascent FC, Charlotte Independence	Charlotte, North Carolina	10,500	1934 (2019–2021 renovation)
Breese Stevens Field	Forward Madison FC	Madison, Wisconsin	5,000	1926
Cardinale Stadium	Monterey Bay FC	Seaside, California	6,000	2022
Cashman Field	Las Vegas Lights FC	Las Vegas, Nevada	9,334	1983 (2019–2020 renovation) (Note: The stadium was originally built in 1983 for the Las Vegas Stars and Las Vegas 51s baseball team. It has been renovated into a soccer-specific stadium with baseball moved to Las Vegas Ballpark.)
Centreville Bank Stadium	Rhode Island FC	Pawtucket, Rhode Island	10,500	2025
Championship Soccer Stadium	Orange County SC	Irvine, California	5,000	2017
CHI Memorial Stadium	Chattanooga Red Wolves SC	Chattanooga, Tennessee	5,500	2020
Heart Health Park	Sacramento Republic FC	Sacramento, California	11,242	2014
Highmark Stadium	Pittsburgh Riverhounds SC	Pittsburgh, Pennsylvania	5,000	2013
Lancaster Municipal Stadium	AV Alta FC	Lancaster, California	5,300	1996 (2025 renovation) (Note: Previously a baseball stadium for the Lancaster JetHawks. Following the folding of the JetHawks due to the reconfiguration of Minor League Ballpark, the stadium was renovated for soccer.)
Lexington SC Stadium	Lexington SC	Lexington, Kentucky	7,500	2024
Lynn Family Stadium	Louisville City FC	Louisville, Kentucky	11,700	2020
One Spokane Stadium	Spokane Velocity, Spokane Zephyr FC	Spokane, Washington	5,000	2023
Optim Health System Field	South Georgia Tormenta FC	Statesboro, Georgia	5,300	2022
Patriots Point Soccer Complex	Charleston Battery	Mount Pleasant, South Carolina	3,500	2000
Phoenix Rising Soccer Stadium	Phoenix Rising FC	Phoenix, Arizona	10,000	2023
Riverfront Stadium	Tampa Bay Sun FC	Tampa, Florida	5,000	2025
Ruoff Mortgage Stadium	Fort Wayne FC	Fort Wayne, Indiana	9,200	2026
Segra Field	Loudoun United FC	Leesburg, Virginia	5,000	2019
Tormenta Stadium	South Georgia Tormenta FC	Statesboro, Georgia	5,300	2022
Toyota Field	San Antonio FC	San Antonio, Texas	8,296	2013
Trinity Health Stadium	Hartford Athletic	Hartford, Connecticut	5,500	1960 (2019 renovation)
WakeMed Soccer Park	North Carolina FC	Cary, North Carolina	10,000	2002
Weidner Field	Colorado Springs Switchbacks	Colorado Springs, Colorado	8,000	2021

=== Stadiums under construction ===
Stadium	Club(s)	City	Planned capacity	Potential opening date
Railyards Stadium	Sacramento Republic FC	Sacramento, California	20,000	2027
AlumniFi Field	Detroit City FC	Detroit, Michigan	15,000	2028

=== Proposed USL soccer-specific stadiums ===
Stadium	Club(s)	City	Proposed capacity
Eleven Park	Indy Eleven	Indianapolis, Indiana	20,000
Iron District Stadium	USL Milwaukee	Milwaukee, Wisconsin	8,000
Pro Iowa Stadium	USL Pro Iowa	Des Moines, Iowa	6,100
Proposed Oakland Roots SC stadium	Oakland Roots SC	Oakland, California	25,000
SPH Stadium	Miami FC	Homestead, Florida	15,000

== NCAA (Division I) ==
Stadium	Team(s)	City	Capacity	Opened
Albert-Daly Field	William & Mary Tribe	Williamsburg, Virginia	1,000	2004
Ambrose Urbanic Field	Pittsburgh Panthers	Pittsburgh, Pennsylvania	735	2011
BBVA Field	UAB Blazers	Birmingham, Alabama	5,000	2015
Belson Stadium	St. John's Red Storm	Queens, New York	2,600	2001
Bill Armstrong Stadium	Indiana Hoosiers	Bloomington, Indiana	6,500	1981
Bobcat Soccer Complex	Texas State Bobcats	San Marcos, Texas	500	2000
Columbia Soccer Stadium	Columbia Lions	Manhattan, New York	3,500	1985
Dick Dlesk Soccer Stadium	West Virginia Mountaineers	Morgantown, West Virginia	1,600	2004
Dr. Mark & Cindy Lynn Stadium	Louisville Cardinals	Louisville, Kentucky	5,300	2014
Elizabeth Lyle Robbie Stadium	Minnesota Golden Gophers	Falcon Heights, Minnesota	1,000	1999
Ellis Field	Texas A&M Aggies	College Station, Texas	3,500	1994
Eugene E. Stone III Stadium	South Carolina Gamecocks	Columbia, South Carolina	5,000	1981
Razorback Field	Arkansas Razorbacks	Fayetteville, AR	1,500	1992
Eugene E. Stone III Stadium	Furman Paladins	Greenville, South Carolina	3,000	1995
Harder Stadium	UC Santa Barbara Gauchos	Santa Barbara, California	17,000	1966
Hermann Stadium	Saint Louis Billikens	St. Louis, Missouri	6,050	1999
Hofstra University Soccer Stadium	Hofstra Pride	Hempstead, New York	1,600	2003
Hurricane Soccer & Track Stadium	Tulsa Golden Hurricane	Tulsa, Oklahoma	2,000	2003
John Crain Field	Oklahoma Sooners	Norman, Oklahoma	3,500	2000
Lamar Soccer Complex	Lamar Lady Cardinals	Beaumont, Texas	500	2009
Mazzella Field	Iona Gaels	New Rochelle, New York	2,400	1989
Mean Green Village	North Texas Mean Green	Denton, Texas	1,000	2006
Merlo Field	Portland Pilots	Portland, Oregon	4,892	1990
Mike Rose Soccer Complex	Memphis Tigers	Memphis, Tennessee	2,500	2001
Morrison Stadium	Creighton Bluejays	Omaha, Nebraska	6,000	2003
Morrone Stadium	UConn Huskies	Storrs, Connecticut	5,100	1969
Nicholls Soccer Complex	Nicholls State Colonels	Thibodaux, Louisiana	1,000	1998
Old Dominion Soccer Complex	Old Dominion Monarchs and Lady Monarchs	Norfolk, Virginia	4,000	1990
Riggs Field	Clemson Tigers	Clemson, South Carolina	6,500	1915
Roberts Stadium	Princeton Tigers	Princeton, New Jersey	2,356	2008
SU Soccer Stadium	Syracuse Orange	Syracuse, New York	1,500	1996
University of Denver Soccer Stadium	Denver Pioneers	Denver, Colorado	2,000	2009
UNCG Soccer Stadium	University of North Carolina at Greensboro	Greensboro, North Carolina	3,540	1990
Veterans Memorial Soccer Complex	Marshall Thundering Herd	Huntington, West Virginia	1,006	2013
Waipio Peninsula Soccer Stadium	Hawaiʻi Rainbow Wahine	Waipiʻo, Hawaii	4,500	2000
Yurcak Field	Rutgers Scarlet Knights	Piscataway, New Jersey	5,000	1994
Ole Miss Soccer Stadium	Ole Miss Rebels	Oxford, Mississippi	1,500	1997

== Other soccer-specific stadiums ==
Stadium	Team(s)	Division	City	Capacity	Opened
City Park Stadium	Westchester Flames	USL2	New Rochelle, New York	1,845	1970s
Chase Stadium	Inter Miami CF II	MLS Next Pro	Fort Lauderdale, Florida	21,550	2019
Historic Crew Stadium	Columbus Crew 2	MLS Next Pro	Columbus, Ohio	20,000	1999
King George V Park	National Stadium; Memorial Sea-Hawks	CONCACAF; U Sports	St. John's, Newfoundland and Labrador	6,400	1925
Lusitano Stadium	Western Mass Pioneers	USL2	Ludlow, Massachusetts	3,000	1918
Macpherson Stadium	North Carolina Fusion U23	USL2	Browns Summit, North Carolina	7,000	2002
Metropolitan Oval			Queens, New York	1,500	1925 (2001 renovation)
Orange Beach Sportsplex	Local teams, SEC Women's Soccer Tournament	Local	Orange Beach, Alabama	1,500	2001
Starfire Sports			Tukwila, Washington	4,500	2002
Switchbacks Training Stadium			Colorado Springs, Colorado	5,000	1985
Uihlein Soccer Park	MSOE Raiders	NCAA	Milwaukee, Wisconsin	7,000	1994
Virginia Beach Sportsplex	Virginia Beach United FC	USL2	Virginia Beach, Virginia	10,500	1999
Wallis Annenberg Stadium	UCLA Bruins teams		Los Angeles, California	2,145	2018
WRAL Soccer Center	CASL teams	CASL	Raleigh, North Carolina	3,200	1990

=== Past soccer-specific stadiums ===
Stadium	Club(s)	City	Capacity	Opened	Years used	Status
Mark's Stadium	Fall River F.C.	Tiverton (CDP), Rhode Island	15,000	1922	1922–1950s	vacant grass lot
Kennesaw State University Stadium	Kennesaw State Owls	Kennesaw, Georgia	8,318	2010	2010–present	converted to a multi-purpose stadium in 2015 after Kennesaw State University launched their football program
Lockhart Stadium	Miami Fusion, Fort Lauderdale Strikers	Fort Lauderdale, FL	17,417	1959	1959–2019	converted to a SSS in 1998 for the Miami Fusion's expansion year, torn down in 2019 to make way for Chase Stadium

== Other countries ==
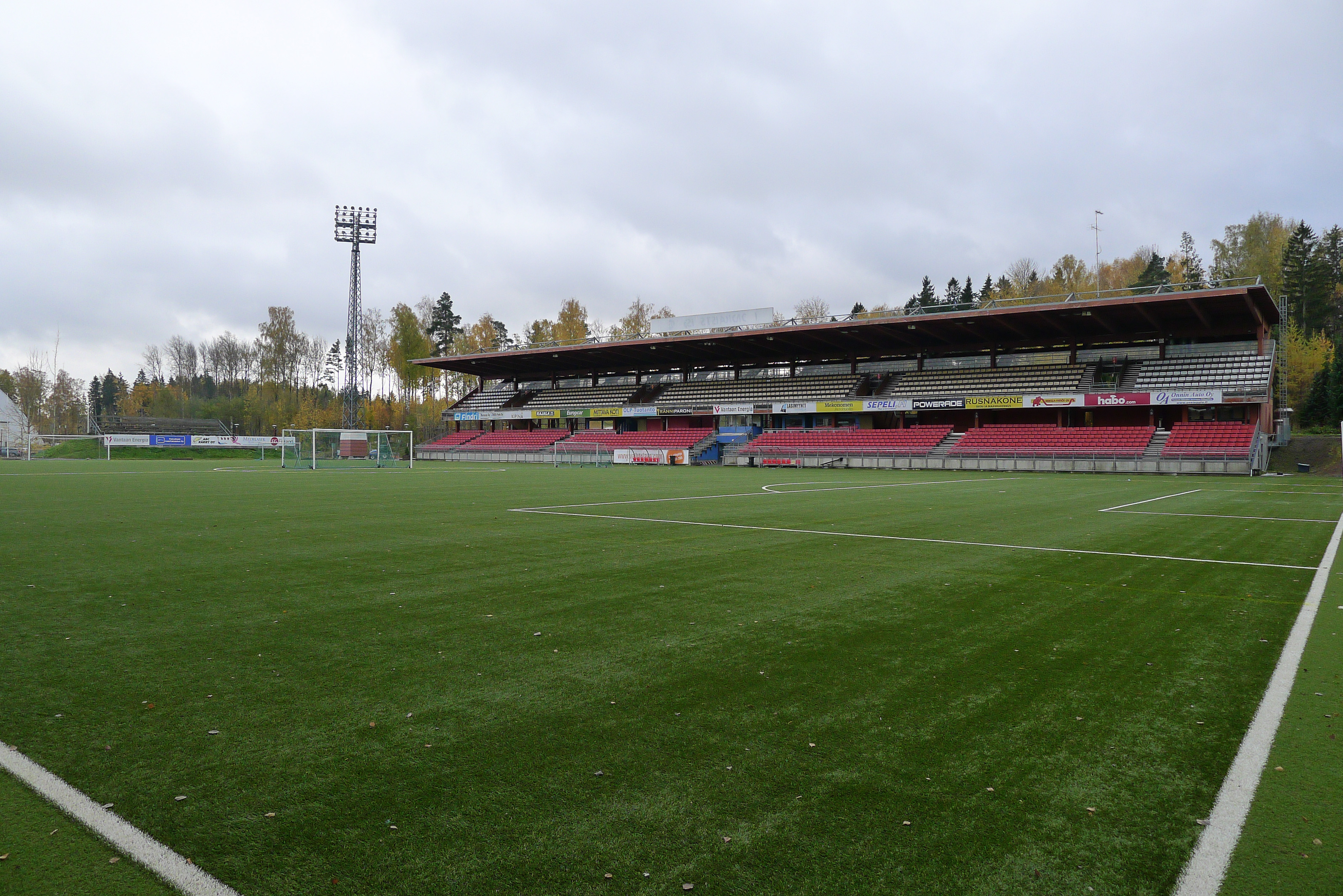
The Myyrmäki Football Stadium in Vantaa, Finland

The term "football-specific stadium" is sometimes used in countries where the sport is known as football rather than soccer, although the term is not common in countries where association football is the dominant sport and thus football-specific stadiums are quite common. The term tends to have a slightly different meaning in these countries, usually referring to a stadium without an athletics track surrounding the field. Some soccer stadiums in Europe are also used for other sports, including rugby, American football, and field hockey. The problem with oversized stadiums designed for another sport is particularly visible in European American football leagues and conflicts between teams sharing the stadium (a notable example are Eintracht Braunschweig and the Braunschweig Lions which share a stadium) and (often municipal) owners of the stadiums sometimes arise, leading to attempts at single sport-specific venues.

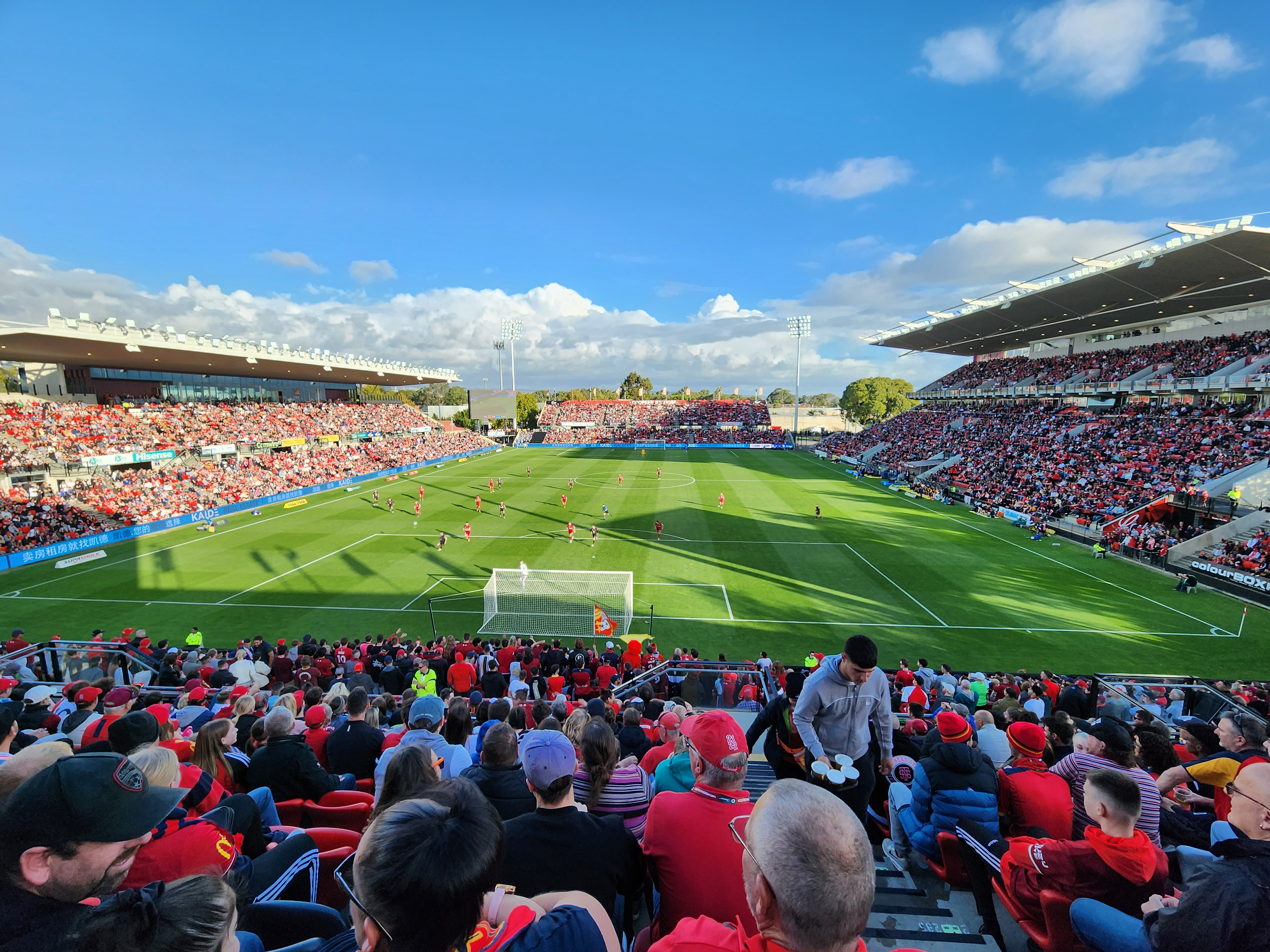
The Hindmarsh Stadium in Adelaide, South Australia

In Australia, the term has much the same meaning as in the United States. The dominance of Australian rules football in the southern states means that unlike in New South Wales and Queensland, rectangular stadiums and grounds capable of hosting top level A-League soccer are rare. Hindmarsh Stadium in Adelaide, South Australia is an example of such a soccer-specific stadium. Being built in the 1960s and progressively updated, the vast majority of matches played there are soccer, with very rare rugby league or rugby union games. The Wyndham City Stadium and Wyndham Regional Football Facility are also examples. Many of the lower-tier state league clubs own their own venues, which also qualify as soccer-specific.

== See also ==
- List of soccer stadiums in the United States
- List of soccer stadiums in Canada
- List of football (soccer) stadiums by capacity
- List of Major League Soccer stadiums
- List of NASL stadiums
- List of National Women's Soccer League stadiums
- List of Women's Professional Soccer stadiums
