= 2009 WPS International Draft =

The 2009 WPS International Draft was a special draft for the Women's Professional Soccer teams Atlanta Beat and Philadelphia Independence taking place on September 22, 2009. Each expansion team picked up to five international players, to be roughly even with the seven existing WPS teams.

== Format ==
Official WPS release

- The maximum number of internationals an expansion team may select during the international expansion draft is 5, less any international players (e.g., non-green card holders) selected by a team in the expansion draft.
- As per current rules, no team may hold the rights to more than 6 internationals at any one time and may only roster 5 at any one time as per USSF regulations.
- The Philadelphia Independence will select first in the international draft, the Atlanta Beat second, alternating picks throughout.

== Results ==
Pick	Player	Pos.	WPS Team	Previous Team
1	(Sweden) Caroline Seger	MF	Philadelphia Independence	Linköpings FC
2	(Switzerland) Ramona Bachmann	FW	Atlanta Beat	Umeå IK
3	(Sweden) Charlotte Rohlin	DF	Philadelphia Independence	Linköpings FC
4	(Denmark) Johanna Rasmussen	FW	Atlanta Beat	Umeå IK
5	(Iceland) Hólmfríður Magnúsdóttir	MF	Philadelphia Independence	Kristianstads DFF
6	(Japan) Mami Yamaguchi	MF	Atlanta Beat	Umeå IK
7	(England) Fara Williams	MF	Philadelphia Independence	Everton L.F.C.
8	(Brazil) Maurine	MF	Atlanta Beat	Santos FC
9	(England) Lianne Sanderson	FW	Philadelphia Independence	Chelsea L.F.C.
10	(Sweden) Therese Sjögran	MF	Atlanta Beat	LdB FC

== See also ==
- List of WPS drafts
