= Milwaukee Pro Soccer =

Professional men's soccer team

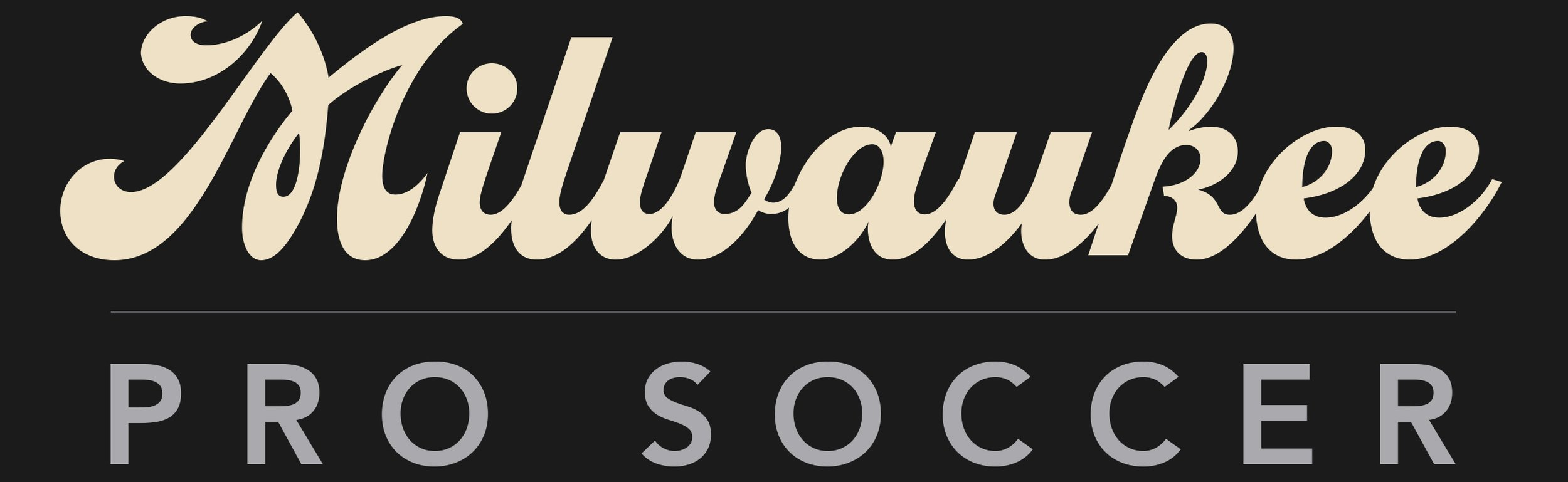
- Founded: 2022
- Stadium: Iron District Stadium; Milwaukee, Wisconsin
- Capacity: 8,000
- Owners: Kacmarcik Enterprises; Milwaukee Pro Soccer
- League: USL Championship

Milwaukee Pro Soccer was a proposed professional football club based in Milwaukee, Wisconsin that is set to compete in USL Championship, the second division of the United States soccer league system.

== History ==
On October 19, 2022, it was announced that a USL Championship franchise had been awarded to Milwaukee-based investors Kacmarcik Enterprises and Milwaukee Pro Soccer. At that time it was also announced that the club would begin play in the 2025 season at a newly constructed 8,000-seat soccer-specific stadium in the upcoming Iron District neighborhood. The franchise is set to become the city's first professional, outdoor soccer team since the Milwaukee Rampage folded in 2002 and Milwaukee Wave United folded in 2004.

A "Name the Team Campaign" created by ownership to hear fan suggestions for team names and branding was ongoing as of 2022. Names such as MKE Tall Boys FC, Cream City FC, Milwaukee Brigade FC, and Milwaukee Iron FC are being considered among others in the final phase of this naming process. The logo and branding for the club and its institution will be developed in conjunction with Cramer-Krasselt.

On November 29, 2023, it was announced that the inaugural season for Milwaukee would be moved back to 2026, as the construction and financing of the Iron District Stadium had been delayed. In March 2026, the team's official Instagram account was deactivated. As of July 2026, the team had made no public statements since its delay, and ground had not been broken on the proposed stadium. And, the USL has moved out of having a team in Milwaukee, and is exploring Green Bay as an option.
