= Iron District Stadium =

Soccer-specific stadium in Milwaukee, Wisconsin

- rendering of the stadium interior
- Interactive map of Iron District Stadium
- Location: Milwaukee, Wisconsin
- Coordinates: 43.0368°N 87.9204°W
- Capacity: 8,000
- Surface: Artificial turf
- Public transit: MCTS

Construction
- Opened: TBD

Tenants
- Milwaukee Pro Soccer; Marquette Golden Eagles soccer Marquette Golden Eagles lacrosse

Iron District Stadium is a proposed 8,000-seat soccer-specific stadium in Milwaukee, Wisconsin. Once completed, it will be home to the city's yet-to-be-named USL Championship club and the Marquette Golden Eagles soccer and lacrosse teams. The stadium will be located in the city's Westown neighborhood on the corner of N. 6th St. and W. Michigan St. and is expected to be completed in 2026.

== History ==
The stadium was first announced in May 2022 as part of the larger Iron District sports and entertainment district development, which will also include housing, a 3,500-seat concert venue, and retail space. The 11-acre property on which the district will be built was purchased from Marquette University. According to the developer, the Iron District will generate nearly $40 million a year and create 588 jobs, with more than $23 million in an annual payroll.

Initial construction on the development began in September 2022. At the official unveiling event for the USL Championship club on October 19, 2022, it was announced that work on the stadium had already begun, including the demolition of the abandoned Ramada Inn which stood on the property.

In June 2023, Republican state legislators blocked $9.3 million in state funds towards the project that had been allocated by Governor Tony Evers. On November 2, Evers was able to restore the funding with state money provided by the American Rescue Plan Act. The delay led to the developer pushing back the project's completion date (and the first season of the new soccer team) one year to 2026.

Construction on the stadium itself was initially expected to begin in early 2024. As of March 2026, no progress has seemingly been made on the construction of the stadium, leading people to believe that complications on pricing have been a factor in the delays of construction of Iron District Stadium.
