= 2010 WPS dispersal draft =

The 2010 WPS Dispersal Draft was a special draft for Women's Professional Soccer (WPS) after the Los Angeles Sol withdrew from the league. Players from the team were dispersed to the remaining seven teams in the league via the draft.

== Background ==
When the Los Angeles Sol folded on January 28, 2010 after a potential sale of the team fell through at the last minute, WPS, which had been running the team after AEG backed out, announced that the nineteen players under contract to the Sol would be dispersed to the remaining WPS teams in a dispersal draft, held on Thursday, February 4, 2010.

== Format ==
The draft order for the first and third rounds is Atlanta, then Philadelphia, followed by the remaining six teams in the reverse order of finish from the 2009 season; draft order for the second round is the reverse of that.

== Round 1 ==
Pick	Player	Pos.	WPS Team
1	(United States) Shannon Boxx	MF	Saint Louis Athletica^
2	(Canada) Karina LeBlanc	GK	Philadelphia Independence
3	(Brazil) Marta	FW	FC Gold Pride
4	(United States) Casey Nogueira	FW	Chicago Red Stars
5	(United States) Stephanie Cox	DF	Boston Breakers
6	(United States) Nikki Washington	MF	Sky Blue FC
7	(United States) Brittany Bock	DF	Washington Freedom
8	(Japan) Aya Miyama	MF	Saint Louis Athletica

== Round 2 ==
Pick	Player	Pos.	WPS Team
9	(United States) Manya Makoski	MF	Atlanta Beat
10	(Nigeria) Faith Ikidi	DF/FW	Washington Freedom
11	(United States) Kiersten Dallstream	FW	Sky Blue FC
12	(United States) Michelle Enyeart	FW	Boston Breakers
13	(United States) Kiki Bosio	FW	FC Gold Pride^^
14	(United States) Christina DiMartino	MF	Saint Louis Athletica^^^
15	(Cameroon) Estelle Johnson	DF	Philadelphia Independence
16	(Czech Republic) Pavlína Ščasná	FW	Atlanta Beat

== Round 3 ==
Pick	Player	Pos.	WPS Team
17	Pass		Atlanta Beat
18	Pass		Philadelphia Independence
19	(United States) Lindsay Browne	FW	FC Gold Pride
20	Pass		Chicago Red Stars
21	Pass		Boston Breakers
22	Pass		Sky Blue FC
23	Pass		Washington Freedom
24	(Denmark) Cathrine Paaske-Sørensen	MF	Saint Louis Athletica

== Draft Notes ==
^ Via trade with Atlanta Beat (trade prior to draft). Saint Louis will send defender Kia McNeill, midfielders Angie Kerr and Amanda Poach, and Athletica’s second round choice in the dispersal draft (9th overall) to Atlanta. In exchange, Saint Louis will receive Atlanta’s first round pick, number one overall, in the dispersal draft, and Atlanta’s second round pick in the 2011 WPS Draft.

^^ Via trade with Chicago Red Stars (Chicago receives FC Gold Pride's 2nd Round pick in 2011 WPS Draft).

^^^ Via trade with Chicago Red Stars (Chicago receives Saint Louis Athletica's 2nd Round pick in 2011 WPS Draft).

== See also ==
- List of WPS drafts
- 2011 WPS season
