= Caroline Seger =

Swedish footballer (born 1985)

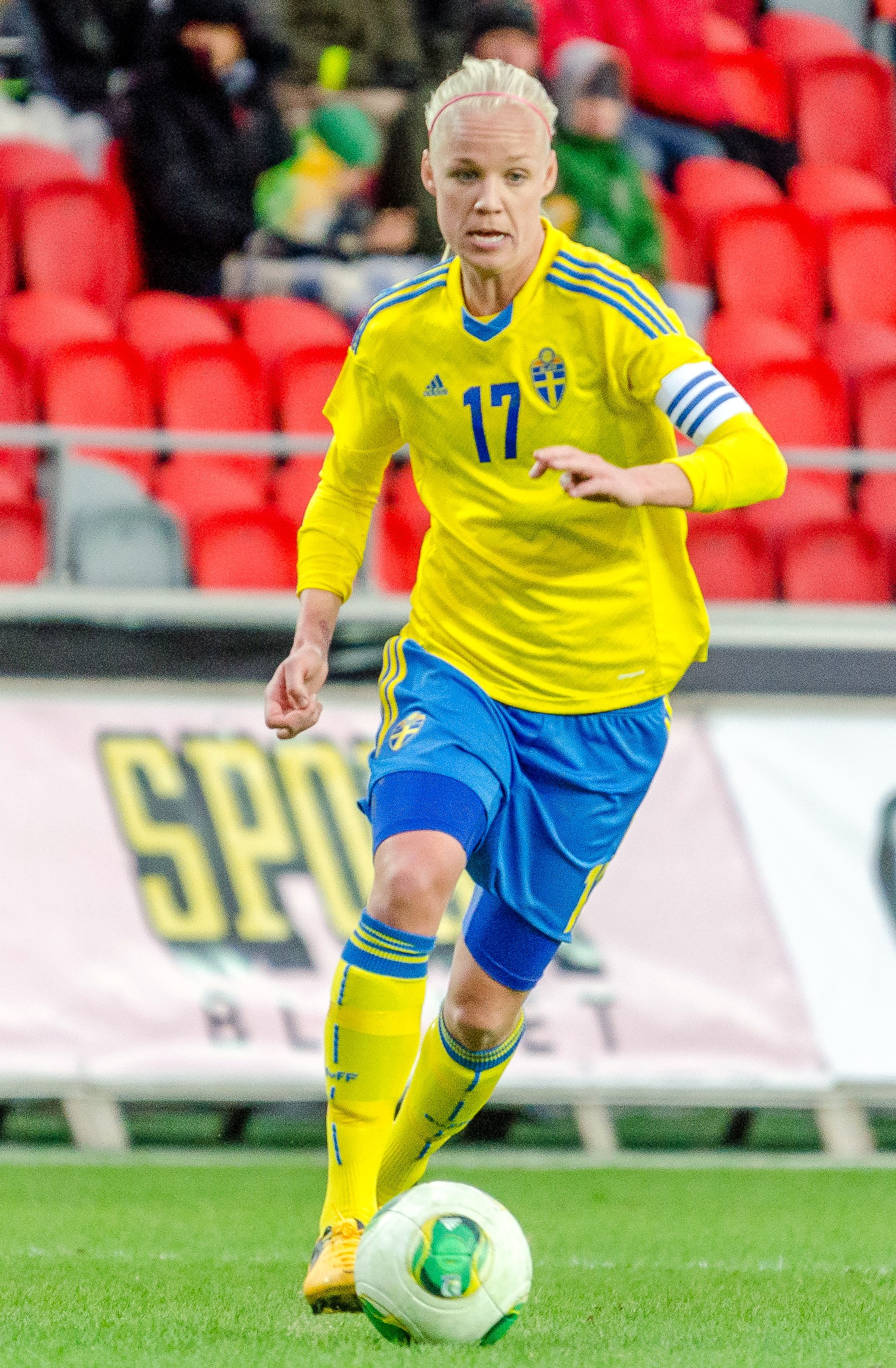
- Seger playing for Sweden in 2013

Personal information
- Full name: Sara Caroline Seger
- Date of birth: 19 March 1985 (age 41)
- Place of birth: Helsingborg, Sweden
- Height: 1.74 m (5 ft 9 in)
- Position: Midfielder

Youth career
- Gantofta IF
- 1998–2000: Rydebäck IF
- 2001–2004: Stattena IF

Senior career*
Years	Team	Apps	(Gls)
2004–2009	Linköpings FC	139	(39)
2010	Philadelphia Independence	21	(2)
2011	Western New York Flash	13	(5)
2011	LdB FC Malmö	7	(3)
2012–2014	Tyresö FF	46	(11)
2014–2016	Paris Saint-Germain	37	(8)
2016–2017	Lyon	18	(0)
2017–2024	FC Rosengård	112	(14)
Total		393	(82)

International career
2001–2002	Sweden U17	12	(3)
2002–2004	Sweden U19	23	(3)
2005–2023	Sweden	240	(32)
Medal record
Women's soccer
Representing Sweden
Olympic Games
Silver medal – second place	2016 Rio de Janeiro	Team
Silver medal – second place	2020 Tokyo	Team
FIFA Women's World Cup
Bronze medal – third place	2011 Germany	Team
Bronze medal – third place	2019 France	Team
Bronze medal – third place	2023 Australia	Team
- * Club domestic league appearances and goals

Sara Caroline Seger (born 19 March 1985) is a Swedish former professional footballer who played as a midfielder. She was the long-standing captain of the Swedish national team until she announced her retirement from international football in December 2023.

== Club career ==
=== Linköping ===
An industrious central midfielder, Seger played for Linköpings FC from 2005 to 2009 and served as the club's captain. Linköping finished in the top four of the Damallsvenskan in four of Seger's five seasons with the team. Their highest finishes were second place in 2008 and first place in 2009. The team also captured the Svenska Cupen on three occasions in 2006, 2008 and 2009.

While playing for Linköping, Seger was honoured as the Damallsvenskan's Rookie of the Year in 2005 and Midfielder of the Year in 2006 and 2009.

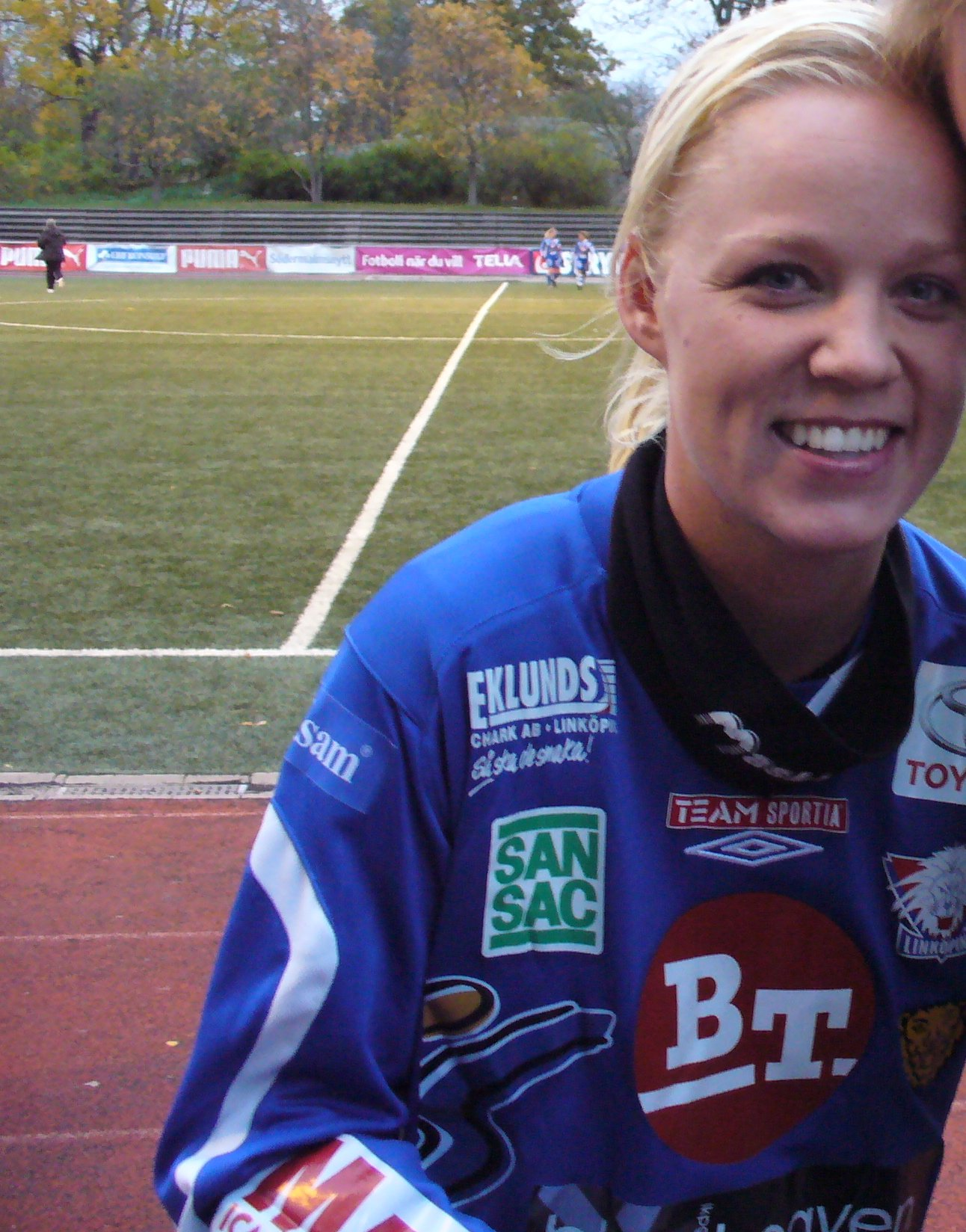
Seger in October 2007

After the team finished second and qualified for the UEFA Women's Champions League, Seger signed a new one-year contract with Linköping in the autumn of 2008. She was proud to lead the club to a league and cup "double" in her final campaign with the team. Seger also won the 2009 Diamantbollen, awarded to the year's best Swedish women's soccer player.

Seger's last game for Linköping was a 2–0 defeat by Duisburg in the 2009–10 UEFA Women's Champions League.

=== United States ===
In September 2009, the expansion team Philadelphia Independence of Women's Professional Soccer (WPS) announced their intention to draft Seger with their first pick in the 2009 international draft. In December 2009, she signed a three-year contract with Philadelphia. Her first season with the Independence began in April 2010 and culminated in a 4–0 defeat to FC Gold Pride in the WPS Championship game. Seger scored one goal and posted five assists in her 18 appearances. She underwent surgery on a heel injury after the season.

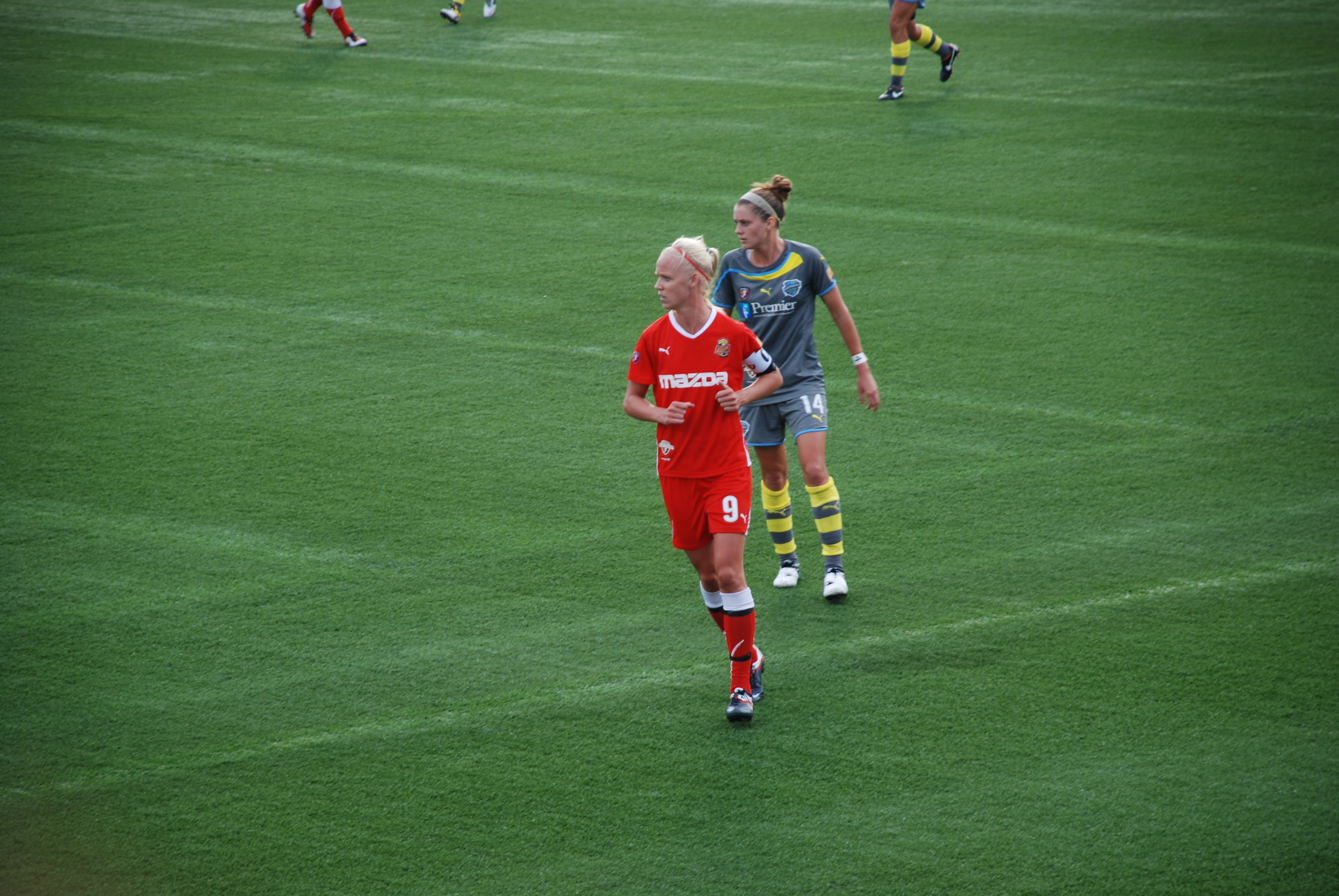
Seger (9) in the 2011 WPS Championship

Seger was traded to Western New York Flash in December 2010 in exchange for draft picks. She joined the franchise in their first season in the WPS and wore the captain's armband. On 14 August 2011 the Seger-led Flash secured the best record in the league, a bye in the playoffs, and played at home for the league championship on 27 August. They beat Seger's former club Philadelphia Independence in the Championship game, 5–4 in PKs after a 1–1 draw.

Seger played just 12 matches for the Flash, as the FIFA Women's World Cup took place during the season. She scored five goals and served one assist. Coach Aaran Lines was very happy with Seger's contribution, but her contract contained a release clause which allowed her to leave for a team outside the United States after one year.

=== Tyresö FF ===
In August 2011, Seger announced that she would join LdB FC Malmö on a short-term contract to cover the remainder of the 2011 Damallsvenskan season, although she remained undecided about her subsequent destination. Later that same month, it was confirmed that Seger would join Tyresö FF on a two-year deal to start in the 2012 Damallsvenskan season. Her three goals in seven league games helped Malmö secure the 2011 Damallsvenskan title.

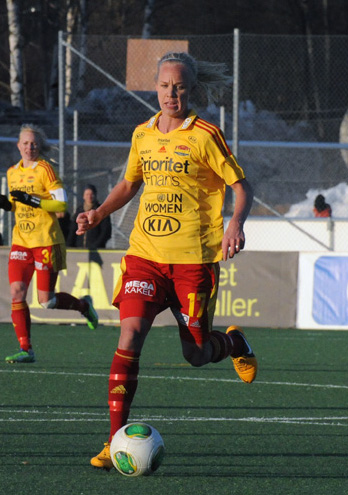
Seger playing for Tyresö in 2013

Seger collected her third Damallsvenskan title in 2012, after Tyresö's dramatic last day win over Malmö. Madelaine Edlund scored the winning goal after Seger's shot had hit the post. Seger and Tyresö were upset in the final of the Svenska Cupen, by Kopparbergs/Göteborg FC who won 2–1 after extra time. In early 2014, it became clear that Tyresö were in financial difficulty and could not afford to keep Seger and their other leading players.

In May 2014, Seger had been approached by Seattle Reign FC, who had obtained her rights for the National Women's Soccer League (NWSL), and two other American teams had expressed interest. She was also in transfer negotiations with Paris Saint-Germain Féminines.

=== Paris Saint-Germain ===
Seger sealed her move to Paris Saint-Germain in June 2014, signing a two-year contract. She left as Tyresö withdrew from the league and released all their players.

=== Olympique Lyon ===
On 2 July 2016, Lyon announced the signing of Seger. In the 2016/17 season Seger helped Lyon win the Division 1 Feminine, the Coupe de France Feminine and the UEFA Women’s Champions League.

=== FC Rosengård ===
In 2017, Seger returned to Sweden by joining FC Rosengård in the Damallsvenskan league. She helped Rosengård win the Svenska Cupen Damer and finish second in the league. On Saturday November 9, 2024 she played the last game of her career, as Rosengård beat Djurgården 3–0. At the end of the game the whole crowd gave her a standing ovation for her outstanding football career.

== International career ==
Seger made her first appearance for the senior Swedish national team in March 2005; a 2–1 defeat by Germany at that year's Algarve Cup. She intended to score the winning goal at UEFA Women's Euro 2005 in North West England. Although Seger was part of the team, she failed to score as Sweden lost to rivals Norway in extra time of the semi-final.

Seger continued to be selected under new coach Thomas Dennerby and was part of the Sweden team surprisingly eliminated in the first round of the 2007 FIFA Women's World Cup. After that failure some experienced players retired and Seger was given a prominent role in the team. In July 2008 she overcame a thigh injury to take her place in the squad for the 2008 Beijing Olympics. In China she participated in the Swedes' 2–0 quarter-final defeat by Germany.

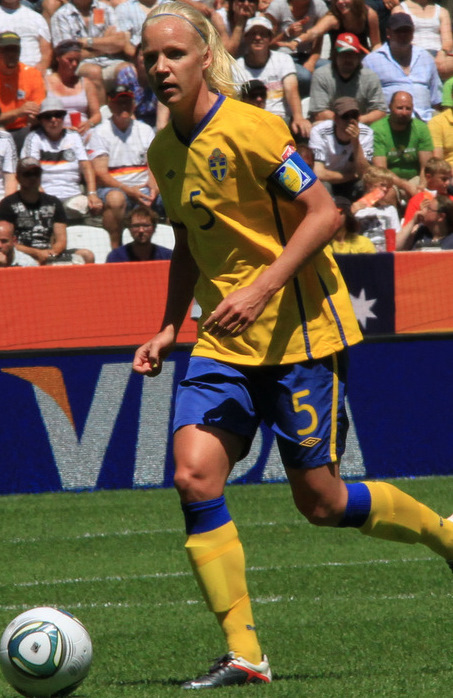
Seger captaining Sweden in World Cup 2011

Impressed by Seger's work rate and positive attitude, Dennerby had appointed her as national team captain for a qualifying match with Italy in May 2008, when regular captain Victoria Sandell Svensson was injured. Sandell Svensson retired after Sweden's 3–1 defeat by Norway in the quarter-final of UEFA Women's Euro 2009 and Seger took over as full-time captain.

Seger led Sweden to third place at the 2011 FIFA Women's World Cup in Germany. She featured in Sweden's 3–1 semi-final defeat to eventual winners Japan in Frankfurt. Sweden secured third place by beating France 2–1 in Sinsheim, although Seger missed the game with a calf injury. Third place also ensured Sweden's qualification for the 2012 Olympic football tournament in London. Dennerby kept Seger in Sweden's Olympic squad for London, where they lost to France in the quarter-finals.

In October 2012, new national team coach Pia Sundhage decided that Seger and Lotta Schelin would share the captaincy. Sundhage named Seger in the squad for UEFA Women's Euro 2013, which Sweden hosted. Seger was disappointed when Sweden lost 1–0 to Germany in the semi-final.

Seger appeared in all 6 matches for Sweden at the 2016 Summer Olympics and won the Silver Medal after a 2–1 loss to Germany.

Seger became the sole captain of the National team after Lotta Schelin’s retirement from international football.

Seger led Sweden to the 2019 FIFA Women's World Cup hosted in France. On 6 July 2019, Seger played her 200th match with Sweden, facing England. The match was a 2–1 victory for Sweden, giving them third place in the World Cup.

On 13 June 2023, she was included in the 23-player squad for the 2023 FIFA Women's World Cup. At the end of that year, in December 2023 she announced her retirement due to her struggle with a calf injury.

== Personal life ==
Seger is an out lesbian, telling QX magazine in December 2013 that she was proud of her girlfriend. In previous years Seger had concealed her orientation, but decided to speak out to be a role model for others. She used to be in a relationship with fellow professional football player Malin Levenstad.

== Career statistics ==
=== International ===
Scores and results list Sweden's goal tally first, score column indicates score after each Seger goal.

List of international goals scored by Caroline Seger
No.	Date	Venue	Opponent	Score	Result	Competition	Ref.
1	13 March 2005	Loulé, Portugal	Norway	1–0	1–1	2005 Algarve Cup	
2	18 June 2006	Minsk, Belarus	Belarus	3–0	6–0	2007 World Cup qualification	
3	5 May 2007	Trento, Italy	Italy	1–0	2–0	Euro 2009 qualifying	
4	8 November 2007	Viborg, Denmark	Denmark	3–1	4–2	2008 Olympic play-off	
5	25 August 2009	Turku, Finland	Russia	3–0	3–0	UEFA Women's Euro 2009	
6	24 October 2009	Baku, Azerbaijan	Azerbaijan	1–0	3–0	2011 World Cup qualification	
7	24 October 2009	Baku, Azerbaijan	Azerbaijan	3–0	3–0	2011 World Cup qualification	
8	28 October 2009	Heverlee, Belgium	Belgium	1–0	4–1	2011 World Cup qualification	
9	28 October 2009	Heverlee, Belgium	Belgium	2–0	4–1	2011 World Cup qualification	
10	23 June 2010	Gothenburg, Sweden	Azerbaijan	5–0	17–0	2011 World Cup qualification	
11	23 June 2010	Gothenburg, Sweden	Azerbaijan	7–0	17–0	2011 World Cup qualification	
12	21 August 2010	Prague, Czech Republic	Czech Republic	1–0	1–0	2011 World Cup qualification	
13	31 March 2012	Malmö, Sweden	Canada	1–0	3–1	Friendly	
14	4 July 2013	Ljungskile, Sweden	England	3–1	4–1	Friendly	
15	21 September 2013	Malmö, Sweden	Poland	1–0	2–0	2015 World Cup qualification	
16	8 May 2014	Växjö, Sweden	Northern Ireland	2–0	3–0	2015 World Cup qualification	
17	14 June 2014	Motherwell, Scotland	Scotland	1–0	3–1	2015 World Cup qualification	
18	19 June 2014	Tórshavn, Faroe Islands	Faroe Islands	1–0	5–0	2015 World Cup qualification	
19	4 March 2015	Vila Real de Santo António, Portugal	Germany	1–2	4–2	2015 Algarve Cup	
20	4 March 2015	Vila Real de Santo António, Portugal	Germany	3–2	4–2	2015 Algarve Cup	
21	8 April 2015	Stockholm, Sweden	Denmark	3–2	3–3	Friendly	
22	27 October 2015	Gothenburg, Sweden	Denmark	1–0	1–0	Euro 2017 qualifying	
23	5 March 2016	Rotterdam, Netherlands	Switzerland	1–0	1–0	2016 Olympic Qualifying	
24	13 June 2017	Växjö, Sweden	Scotland	1–0	1–0	Friendly	
25	24 October 2017	Borås, Sweden	Hungary	4–0	5–0	2019 World Cup qualification	
26	5 April 2018	Szombathely, Hungary	Hungary	1–0	4–1	2019 World Cup qualification	
27	6 April 2019	Stockholm, Sweden	Germany	1–2	1–2	Friendly	
28	3 September 2019	Liepāja, Latvia	Latvia	3–1	4–1	Euro 2022 qualifying	
29	13 April 2021	Łódź, Poland	Poland	3–2	4–2	Friendly	
30	21 September 2021	Gothenburg, Sweden	Georgia	3–0	4–0	2023 World Cup qualification	
31	21 September 2021	Gothenburg, Sweden	Georgia	4–0	4–0	2023 World Cup qualification	
32	23 February 2022	Lagos, Portugal	Italy	1–1	1–1 (p 6–5)	2022 Algarve Cup	

== Honours ==
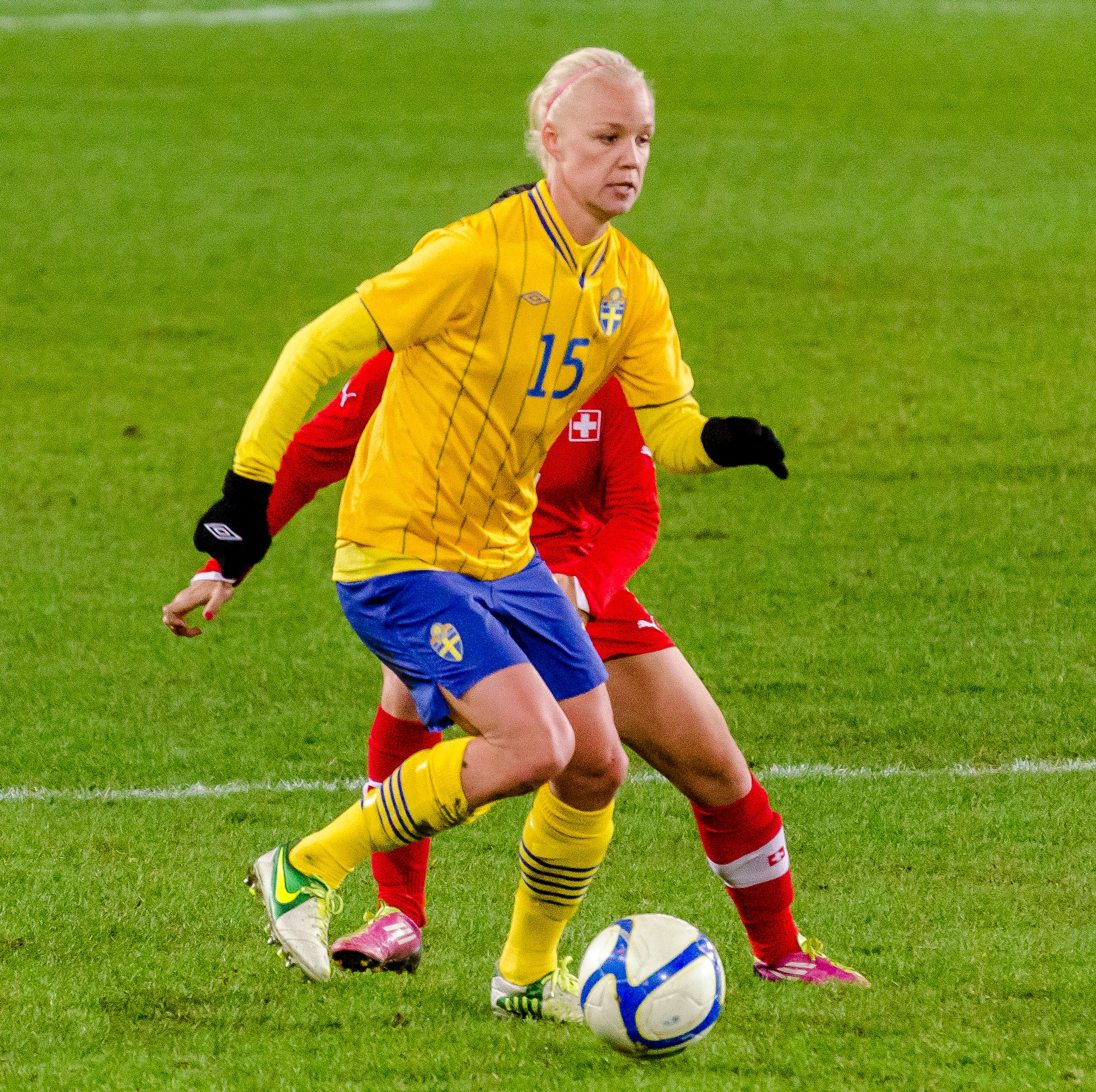
Seger playing her first game for new coach Pia Sundhage at Växjö's Myresjöhus Arena

Linköpings FC

- Damallsvenskan: 2009
- Svenska Cupen: 2006, 2008, 2009
- Svenska Supercupen: 2009

Western New York Flash

- Women's Professional Soccer: 2011

LdB FC Malmö

- Damallsvenskan: 2011
- Svenska Supercupen: 2011

Tyresö FF

- Damallsvenskan: 2012

Olympique Lyon

- Division 1 Féminine: 2016–17
- Coupe de France Féminine: 2017
- UEFA Women's Champions League: 2016–17

Rosengard

- Damallsvenskan: 2019, 2021, 2022
- Svenska Cupen: 2017–18, 2021–22

Sweden

- FIFA Women's World Cup Third place: 2011, 2019, 2023
- Summer Olympics Silver Medal: 2016, 2020
- Algarve Cup: 2009, 2018

Sweden U19

- Nordic Cup: runner-up 2004

Sweden U17

- Nordic Cup: runner-up 2001, 2002

Individual

- Sweden Breakthrough Player of the Year; 2005
- Best Swedish Midfielder: 2006, 2009, 2010, 2014, 2015
- Diamantbollen: 2009, 2019
- FIFA Women's World Cup All-Star Team: 2011
- UEFA Squad of the Tournament: UEFA Women's Euro 2013
