= List of WPS drafts =

The following is a list of drafts held by Women's Professional Soccer, with a brief description of each.

== Preseason 2008–09 (inaugural) ==
- 2008 WPS Player Allocation: All twenty-one players in the USWNT player pool told the league which of the seven initial teams they would like to play for, with the teams likewise telling the league which players they wanted. WPS announced which players would go to which teams on September 16.
- 2008 WPS International Draft: With pick order based on the strength of the USWNT allocation, teams chose which foreign players they wanted negotiating rights for on September 24. Four rounds.
- 2008 WPS General Draft: On October 6, the teams had four rounds of drafting other top-level domestic players.
- 2009 WPS Draft: Held at the NSCAA convention in St. Louis on January 16, seventy of the top players not previously selected - most of them from college, but some with previous USWNT or WUSA experience - were picked by the WPS coaches based on the players' performance at one of the two WPS combines held in December.

== Offseason 2009–10 ==
- 2009 WPS Expansion Draft: The Atlanta Beat and Philadelphia Independence pick nine players each from the seven existing WPS teams on September 15.
- 2009 WPS International Draft: On September 22, the Atlanta Beat and Philadelphia Independence select up to five non-American players each. The existing seven WPS teams were not included in this draft.
- 2010 WPS Draft: Held January 15 at the annual NSCAA convention, this year in Philadelphia; all nine teams drafted players to fill out their rosters. The two expansion teams received extra picks during the first round.
- 2010 WPS Dispersal Draft: Held on February 4 to disperse the players of the Los Angeles Sol to the eight remaining WPS teams after the Sol folded in the last week of January.

== Offseason 2010–11 ==
- 2010 WPS Expansion Draft: Held November 20, 2010 for expansion team, Western New York Flash to acquire players
- 2011 WPS Draft: Held January 14 at the annual NSCAA convention, this year in Baltimore; all six teams drafted players to fill out their rosters. The expansion Western New York Flash received an extra first round pick.

== Offseason 2011–12 ==
- 2012 WPS Draft: Held January 13 at the annual NSCAA convention, this year in Kansas City, Missouri. All five teams drafted players to fill out their rosters in twenty-three picks over four rounds.

== See also ==
- List of WUSA drafts
- List of NWSL drafts
