= List of Women's Professional Soccer stadiums =

The following is a list of Women's Professional Soccer stadiums including past, present, and future stadiums. Included are the stadium names, dates of occupation, occupant, date of opening and location:

Stadiums in bold type are those either currently in use by existing teams or the last stadiums used by defunct teams.

Women's Professional Soccer Stadiums
Team (former names)	Stadium (former names)	Years Used	Capacity	Opened	City
Atlanta Beat	**Kennesaw State University Soccer Stadium**	2010-	8,300	2010	Kennesaw, Georgia
Boston Breakers	**Harvard Stadium**	2009-2011	30,323	1903	Boston, Massachusetts
Philadelphia Independence	John A. Farrell Stadium	2010	7,500	?	West Chester, Pennsylvania
Philadelphia Independence	**Leslie Quick Stadium**	2011-	4,000+	1994	Chester, Pennsylvania
Philadelphia Independence	**PPL Park** (Playoff games)	2011-	18,500	2010	Chester, Pennsylvania
Sky Blue FC	TD Bank Ballpark (first two home games); Commerce Bank Ballpark (2000–2008); Somerset Ballpark (1999–2000)	2009	6,100	1999	Bridgewater Township, New Jersey
Sky Blue FC	**Yurcak Field**	2009-	5,000	1994	Piscataway Township, New Jersey
magicJack Washington Freedom (2009-2010)	Maryland SoccerPlex	2009-2010	5,126	2000	Boyds, Maryland
magicJack Washington Freedom (2009-2010)	RFK Stadium (Select games)	2009-2010	45,600	1959	Washington, D.C.
magicJack Washington Freedom (2009-2010)	**FAU Soccer Field**	2011-	1,200	?	Boca Raton, Florida
Western New York Flash	**Sahlen's Stadium**; Marina Auto Stadium (2009–2010); PAETEC Park (2006–2008); Rochester Rhinos Stadium (2008–2009)	2011	13,768	2006	Rochester, New York
**Defunct Teams Stadiums**
Team (former names)	Stadium (former names)	Years Used	Capacity	Opened	City
Chicago Red Stars	**Toyota Park**	2009-2010	20,000	2006	Bridgeview, Illinois
FC Gold Pride	Buck Shaw Stadium	2009	10,300	1962	Santa Clara, California
FC Gold Pride	Castro Valley High School Athletic Stadium (first four home games)	2010	4,500	2007	Castro Valley, California
FC Gold Pride	**Pioneer Stadium**	2010	5,000	1964	Hayward, California
Los Angeles Sol	**The Home Depot Center**	2009	27,000	2003	Carson, California
Saint Louis Athletica	Ralph Korte Stadium	2009	5,000	1994	Edwardsville, Illinois
Saint Louis Athletica	Robert R. Hermann Stadium (one game)	2009	6,050	1999	St. Louis, Missouri
Saint Louis Athletica	**Anheuser-Busch Center**; St. Louis Soccer Park (1982-1996)	2009-10	6,200	1982	Fenton, Missouri
