= Women's Professional Soccer =

American women's soccer league (2009–2012)

Women's Professional Soccer (WPS)
- Founded: 2009
- Folded: 2012; 14 years ago
- Country: United States
- Confederation: CONCACAF (North America)
- Number of clubs: 7 (2009–2010); 6 (2011)
- Level on pyramid: 1
- Last champions: Western New York Flash
- Broadcaster(s): Comcast SportsNet; Fox Soccer Channel; Fox Sports en Español; Local coverage

Women's Professional Soccer (WPS) was the top-level professional women's soccer league in the United States. It began play on March 29, 2009. The league had seven teams for its first two seasons and fielded six teams for its 2011 season, with plans for future expansion. The WPS was the highest level in the U.S. soccer pyramid for the women's game.

On January 30, 2012, the league announced suspension of the 2012 season, citing several internal organization struggles as the primary cause. Some of these issues included an ongoing legal battle with magicJack owner Dan Borislow and a lack of resources invested in the league. On May 18, 2012, WPS announced the league had folded and would not return in 2013. After the WPS folded, the National Women's Soccer League (NWSL) formed in 2013 and took WPS's place as the top professional women's soccer league in the U.S.

== History ==
=== Planning ===
After the folding of the Women's United Soccer Association (WUSA), which played its third and final full season in 2003, the WUSA Reorganization Committee was formed in September of that year. The committee led to the founding of the non-profit organization, Women's Soccer Initiative, Inc. (WSII), in November 2004. WSII's stated goal was "promoting and supporting all aspects of women's soccer in the United States", including the founding of a new professional league. Attempts to relaunch the WUSA in full fell through in 2004 (when the league's member teams played in two WUSA Festivals instead) and in 2005. In June 2006, WSII announced the relaunch of the league for the 2008 season.

In December 2006, the organization announced it had reached an agreement with six owner-operators for teams based in Chicago, Dallas, Los Angeles, St. Louis, Washington, DC, and a then-unnamed city. Later, Boston and New York/New Jersey were announced as other markets to have teams. In September 2007, the league's launch was pushed back from Spring of 2008 to 2009 to avoid conflicting with the 2007 Women's World Cup and the 2008 Olympic Games, and to ensure that all teams were prepared for long-term operations.

On May 27, 2008, the league announced it would expand to Philadelphia for the 2010 season, with the franchise likely sharing facilities with MLS's Philadelphia Union. Despite Philadelphia being the eighth named team in total, the league still considered adding an eighth team to play in its inaugural season, specifically. This team was tentatively announced as being located in San Diego, and was finalized later. Still, despite the extra time given to the original five cities for preparations, the Dallas franchise did not materialize. Thus, the league began with seven teams.

WPS Major Trophy Winners
Season	Playoff Champions	Regular Season Champions
2009	Sky Blue FC	Los Angeles Sol
2010	FC Gold Pride	FC Gold Pride
2011	Western New York Flash	Western New York Flash

The new name of the league, Women's Professional Soccer, was announced on January 17, 2008, along with the logo, which featured the silhouette of retired player Mia Hamm.

=== Building the league ===
==== Player allocation ====
Player allocation began on September 16, 2008, after the Beijing Olympics in August, when WPS announced the allocation of 21 U.S. national team players, three players to each of the seven teams that began play in the 2009 season. Most players were matched with teams they had some previous connection to, such as hometown, college, WUSA, or W-League affiliation. All of the allocated Americans played in the 2009 season except for Kate Markgraf, who was pregnant at the start of the season. A week later, the league held the 2008 WPS International Draft, in which the seven teams selected four international players each. Four of the first five selections, first pick Formiga (Bay Area), Marta (#3, Los Angeles), Daniela (#4, St. Louis), and Cristiane (#5, Chicago) were Brazilian, and a total of 10 Brazilian players were selected. England's Kelly Smith (#2, Boston) and Japan's Homare Sawa (#6, Washington), and Australia's Sarah Walsh rounded out the first round. The draft order was based on a weighted ranking determined by a vote of league coaches following the U.S. women's national team allocation. A general draft was held in October, followed by a combine for college seniors and undrafted players in December, a post-combine draft in January, and local tryouts by individual teams in February.

==== Inaugural season ====
Before the season began, WPS only secured two sponsors, and most teams did not advertise much or get their rosters finalized until late in the preseason. During the season, though, WPS secured several more sponsors and announced the expansion to Atlanta as the ninth team for its next season.

WPS's inaugural game was played to a crowd of over 14,000 fans at the Home Depot Center as the hosts Los Angeles Sol beat the Washington Freedom 2–0.

The first season saw several issues, including an uneven schedule due to the odd number of teams (that the Sol took advantage of, as they won the inaugural season), several season-ending injuries, two major trades, decisions from the WPS disciplinary committee and commissioner, and a Cinderella-run to the championship title (won by Sky Blue FC). Most teams considered the first season a moderate success, despite many losing more money than planned.

=== Growing pains ===
This success/optimism did not extend to the Sol, however, as after AEG failed to sell the team, it was announced that the Sol would be disbanding. Since AEG had given the Sol back to the league, a dispersal draft was held to distribute the players to the remaining eight teams. This was not the case when the Saint Louis Athletica suddenly and unexpectedly ran into financial problems and folded mid-season. The league's schedule had to be re-done, and all of Athletica's players became free agents. Most were signed by the Atlanta Beat, who had only earned one point until then and ultimately finished the season at the bottom of the table.

The other expansion franchise, the Philadelphia Independence, fared better, finishing third on the season and ultimately losing the WPS Final to the incredibly dominant FC Gold Pride. Around the same time, WPS announced the addition of a western New York franchise for the 2011 season, spawning from the existing Buffalo Flash organization. Despite these strong showings, overall attendance for 2010 was down from 2009, and one team (the Washington Freedom) made public mid-season that it was looking for new investors. Also, after the championship game, commissioner Tonya Antonucci announced she would step down, with Anne-Marie Eileraas becoming the new WPS CEO.

More problems came to light early in the offseason. Four teams—FC Gold Pride, the Chicago Red Stars, the Boston Breakers, and Washington—all missed the payment deadline for a large up-front escrow meant to prevent situations like what happened to St. Louis. Ultimately, the Gold Pride could not find the necessary money and folded. Chicago was given a 30-day extension but announced in December that they would not play in WPS in 2011, opting to regroup in the second-tier Women's Premier Soccer League. Washington and Boston were ultimately able to make their payments, leaving six teams for the 2011 season.

=== National exposure ===
The beginning of the league's third season was marked by overshadowing challenges: the loss of the Chicago Red Stars and the FC Gold Pride (defending WPS Champion), low attendance, problems with (ex-Freedom) magicJack owner Dan Borislow, and an FC Gold Pride-like dominance by the Western New York Flash. While national team players were away at the 2011 FIFA Women's World Cup, though, the Independence started a streak that saw them temporarily overtake the Flash at the top of the table.

The success of the U.S. women's national soccer team at the 2011 FIFA Women's World Cup resulted in an upsurge in attendance league-wide and helped set a new all-time league attendance record for a single game at 15,504 during a match between the Western New York Flash and magicJack in Abby Wambach's hometown of Rochester, New York on July 20, 2011. A new attendance record for a WPS final was also set a few weeks later at Sahlen's Stadium again in Rochester when 10,461 fans filled the stadium on August 27, 2011, for the championship game between the Flash and the Philadelphia Independence. The final was also the closest-contested in the league's short history, with both teams scoring and ultimately going into penalty kicks, where the Flash bested the Independence 5–4 with a last-round save made by Ashlyn Harris.

The national exposure to women's soccer, and the upswing in attendance, sparked other groups interested in bringing teams to the WPS. The league had hoped to have 10 teams for the 2012 season, with most of the new groups potentially coming from the western half of the country, but ultimately no ownership groups were ready to join in time and instead aimed for the 2013 season. On November 20, 2011, the United States Soccer Federation (USSF) gave the WPS 15 days to field a sixth team, for the league to maintain its Division 1 status, after magicJack was terminated by the league. magicJack would later be reinstated as an exhibition team, slated to play seven games each for the next two seasons against WPS teams.

The league had sought an extension of the league size waiver through the 2012 season, which would include the 2012 Summer Olympics, in hopes of attracting more sponsors for the 2013 season. USSF granted sanctioning, with conditions requiring expansion, through 2014. At the time, the WPS was interested in expanding beyond the East Coast, and several MLS teams had expressed interest in cooperating with expansion teams, among them Seattle Sounders FC and Vancouver Whitecaps FC.

=== Folding ===
On January 30, 2012, the league announced suspension of the 2012 season, citing several internal organization struggles as the primary cause. Some of these included an ongoing legal battle with ex-franchise owner Dan Borislow, and the lack of resources invested into the league.

Prior to the formal announcement, the USSF showed reservation about renewing sanctioning for WPS, citing the sparsity and geographic concentration of WPS teams as the main problem. (USSF requires professional, top-division leagues to have at least eight teams over at least three time zones.) Ultimately, USSF granted WPS a waiver on this issue for the third time in WPS's history, on the conditions that WPS expands to six teams by 2013 and eight by 2014.

On May 18, 2012, the WPS announced the league had officially ceased operations. The Boston Breakers and Western New York Flash were later assimilated into the WPSL Elite League.

== Organization ==
=== Business model ===
WPS commissioner Tonya Antonucci said that unlike WUSA, which had higher expectations and employed a top-down model, WPS would take "a local, grass roots approach", and "a slow and steady growth type of approach", citing WUSA's losses of close to $100M. She said the new league would have a closer relationship with Major League Soccer, the top men's professional league in the U.S., to cut costs on staff and facilities, and for marketing.

The team budgets for the inaugural season was $2.5M.

=== WPS Players Union ===
WPS players were represented by the Women's Professional Soccer Players Union (WPSPU), an independent, democratic labor organization run by and for the players. The WPSPU was certified and recognized by the league on September 8, 2010, in Washington, DC. Jennifer Hitchon served as Executive Director and Robert H. Stropp of Mooney, Green, Baker & Saindon, PC, was General Counsel. The players who made up the 2011–2012 WPSPU Executive Committee were Eniola Aluko, Rachel Buehler, Allison Falk, Leslie Osborne, Christie Rampone, Becky Sauerbrunn, Cat Whitehill, and Kristine Lilly (member emeritus). These players were responsible for advising the Executive Director, setting union priorities, approving union bargaining positions and proposals, and responding to WPS counter-proposals, among other activities.

=== Media coverage ===
Fox Soccer Channel and Fox Sports en Español with Samuel Jacobo and Jorge Caamaño aired weekly Sunday night matches (20 regular-season games) and the WPS All-Star Game. Fox Sports Net aired the semifinal and league championship contests. The national television contract was in effect through the 2011 season with an option for 2012. Some local networks aired games.

== Teams ==
Team	Stadium	City	Founded	Joined WPS	Left	Fate
Atlanta Beat	KSU Soccer Stadium	Kennesaw, Georgia	2009	2010	2012	Dissolved
Boston Breakers	Harvard Stadium	Boston, Massachusetts	2008	2009	2012	Joined the WPSLE in 2012
Chicago Red Stars	Toyota Park	Bridgeview, Illinois	2007	2009	2011	Joined the WPSL in 2011
FC Gold Pride	Pioneer Stadium	Hayward, California	2008	2009	2011	Dissolved
Los Angeles Sol	Home Depot Center	Carson, California	2007	2009	2010	Dissolved
magicJack^	FAU Soccer Field	Boca Raton, Florida	2001	2009	2012	Dissolved
Philadelphia Independence	Leslie Quick Stadium	Chester, Pennsylvania	2009	2010	2012	Dissolved
Sky Blue FC	Yurcak Field	Piscataway Township, New Jersey	2008	2009	2012	Joined the NWSL in 2013
Saint Louis Athletica	Anheuser-Busch Soccer Park	Fenton, Missouri	2008	2009	2010	Dissolved
Western New York Flash	Sahlen's Stadium	Rochester, New York	2008	2011	2012	Joined the WPSLE in 2012

^- Team was originally named the Washington Freedom

Locations of the teams

== Attendance ==
Year	Season			Playoffs		
Year	Games	Total	Average	Games	Total	Average
2009	70	327,878	4,684	3	16,499	5,500
2010	87	313,272	3,601	3	10,282	3,427
2011	54	190,884	3,535	3	17,946	5,982

== Commissioners and CEOs ==
Name	Years	Ref.
Tonya Antonucci (commissioner)	2007–2010	
Anne-Marie Eileraas (CEO)	2010–2011	
Jennifer O'Sullivan (CEO)	2011–2012	

== Awards ==
WPS handed out seven end-of-year awards. Six of them dated to the league's formation, while the Rookie of the Year award was added in 2010.

- Michelle Akers Player of the Year Award
- WPS Coach of the Year Award
- WPS Defender of the Year Award
- WPS Goalkeeper of the Year Award
- WPS Rookie of the Year Award
- WPS Golden Boot
- WPS Sportswoman of the Year

== See also ==
- List of Women's Professional Soccer stadiums
- List of WPS drafts
- List of non-American WPS players
- Women's United Soccer Association
- National Women's Soccer League
- United States women's national soccer team
- National Soccer Hall of Fame
- List of professional sports teams in the United States and Canada
- Women's professional sports
- Women's sports

Preceded by Women's United Soccer Association	Division 1 soccer league in the United States; 2007–2012	Succeeded by National Women's Soccer League
