= Big Ten Conference women's soccer awards =

The Big Ten Conference presents several annual honors for the best women's soccer players of the season. The conference currently presents individual awards for Forward of the Year, Midfielder of the Year, Defender of the Year, Goalkeeper of the Year, and Freshman of the Year. It also presents an award for Coach of the Year.

== Key ==
*	Awarded a national player of the year award: Hermann Trophy (1988–present); Honda Sports Award (1988–present); TopDrawerSoccer National Player of the Year (2011–present)

== Player of the Year (1994–2003) ==
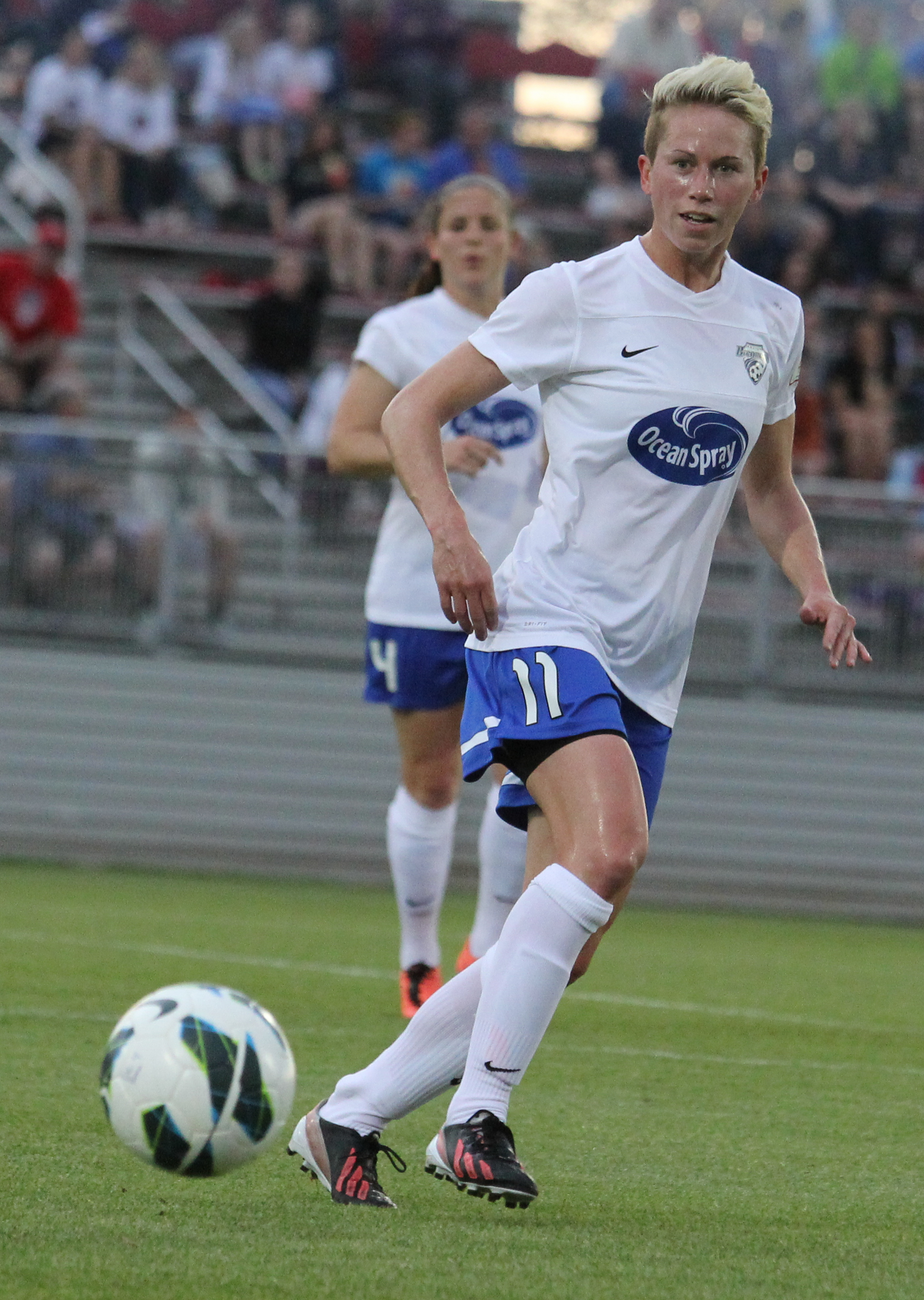
Joanna Lohman, Penn State, 2003

Big Ten Conference Player of the Year
Season	Player	School	Position	Class	Ref.
1994	Karen Winslow	Michigan State	Midfielder	Senior	
1995	Jennifer Walek	Minnesota	Forward	Junior	
1996	Jennifer McElmury	Minnesota	Midfielder	Junior	
1997	Jennifer McElmury (2)	Minnesota	Midfielder	Senior	
1998	Erica Westrich	Northwestern	Midfielder	Junior	
1999	Christie Welsh	Penn State	Forward	Freshman	
2000	Christie Welsh (2)	Penn State	Forward	Sophomore	
2001	Christie Welsh (3) *	Penn State	Forward	Junior	
2002	Abby Crumpton	Michigan	Forward	Senior	
2003	Joanna Lohman	Penn State	Midfielder	Senior	

== Offensive Player of the Year (2004–2010) ==
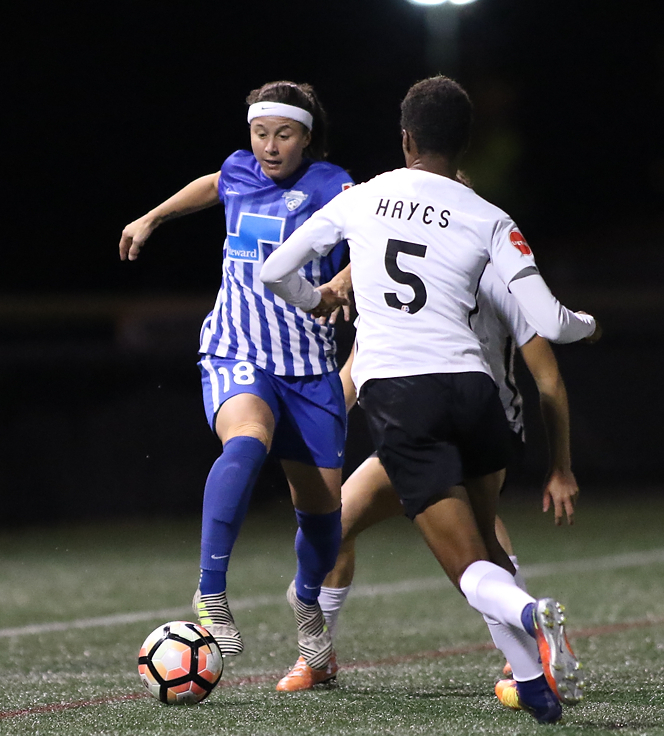
Tiffany Weimer, Penn State, 2× Big Ten Offensive Player of the Year

Big Ten Conference Offensive Player of the Year
Season	Player	School	Position	Class	Ref.
2004	Tiffany Weimer	Penn State	Forward	Junior	
2005	Tiffany Weimer (2)	Penn State	Forward	Senior	
2006	Ella Masar	Illinois	Forward	Junior	
2007	Parrissa Eyorokon	Purdue	Forward	Senior	
2008	Laura Heyboer	Michigan State	Forward	Freshman	
2009	Katie Schoepfer	Penn State	Forward	Senior	
2010	Paige Maxwell	Ohio State	Forward	Junior	

== Defensive Player of the Year (2004–2010) ==
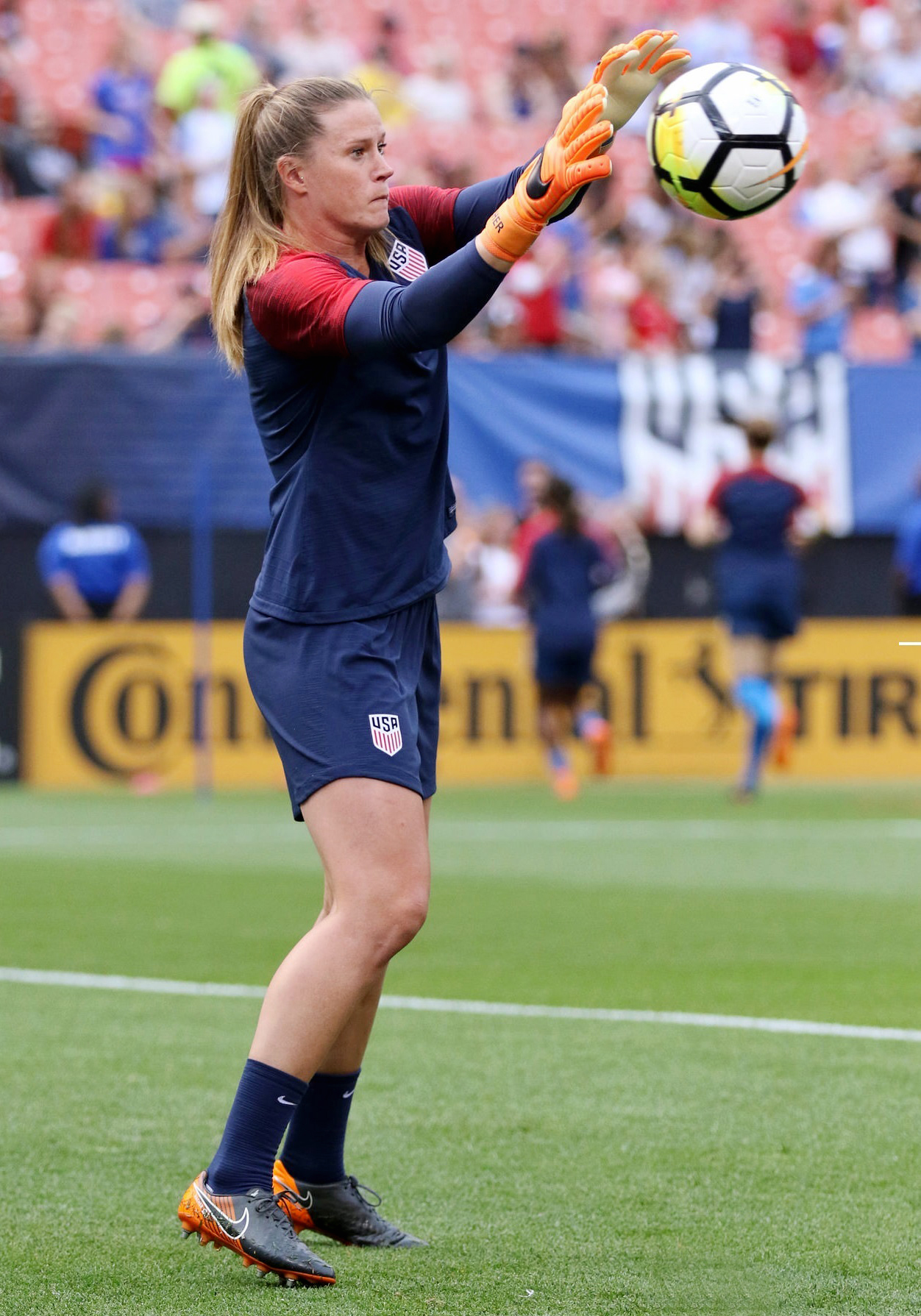
Alyssa Naeher, Penn State, 2× Big Ten Defensive Player of the Year

Big Ten Conference Defensive Player of the Year
Season	Player	School	Position	Class	Ref.
2004	Natalie Jacobs	Penn State	Defender	Sophomore	
2005	Christen Karniski	Illinois	Defender	Senior	
2005	Lindsay Bach	Penn State	Defender	Fifth-year senior	
2006	Emily Zurrer	Illinois	Defender	Sophomore	
2006	Ali Krieger	Penn State	Defender	Senior	
2007	Alyssa Naeher	Penn State	Goalkeeper	Sophomore	
2008	Kelsey Hood	Minnesota	Midfielder	Senior	
2009	Alyssa Naeher (2)	Penn State	Goalkeeper	Senior	
2010	Cassie Dickerson	Ohio State	Defender	Senior	

== Forward of the Year (2011–present) ==
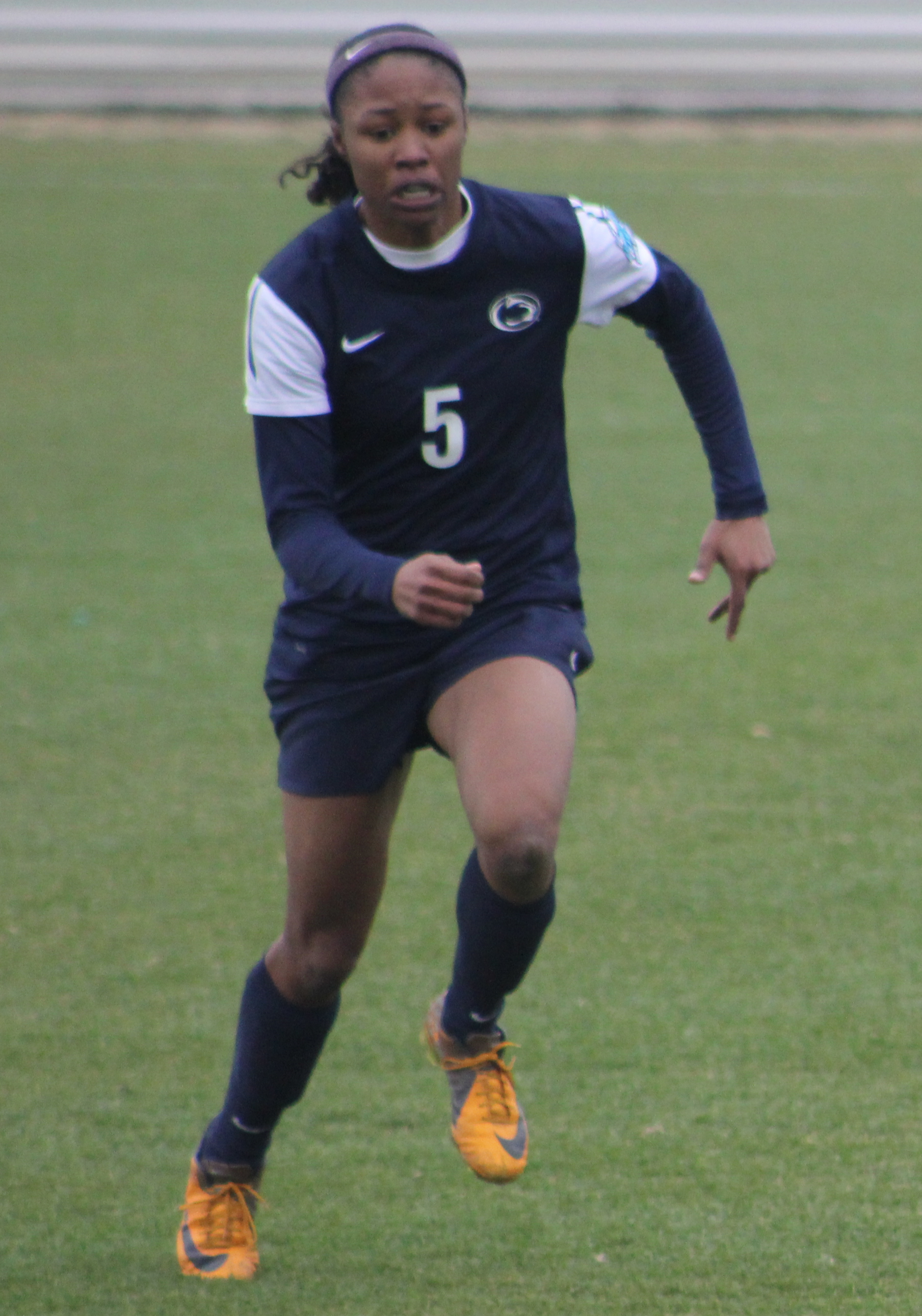
Maya Hayes, Penn State, 2× Big Ten Forward of the Year

Big Ten Conference Forward of the Year
Season	Player	School	Class	Ref.
2011	Maya Hayes	Penn State	Sophomore	
2012	Maya Hayes (2)	Penn State	Junior	
2013	Jannelle Flaws	Illinois	Junior	
2014	Jannelle Flaws (2)	Illinois	Senior	
2015	Simone Kolander	Minnesota	Junior	
2016	Simone Kolander (2)	Minnesota	Senior	
2017	Maddy Williams	Purdue	Senior	
2018	April Bockin	Minnesota	Senior	
2019	Dani Rhodes	Wisconsin	Senior	
2020	Ally Schlegel	Penn State	Sophomore	
2021	Sarah Griffith	Purdue	Senior	
2022	Lauren DeBeau	Michigan State	Senior	
2023	Eleanor Dale	Nebraska	Senior	
2024	Khyah Harper	Minnesota	Senior	
2025	Kennedy Bell	Michigan State	Junior	
2026	Jaiden Anderson	Purdue	Junior	

== Midfielder of the Year (2011–present) ==
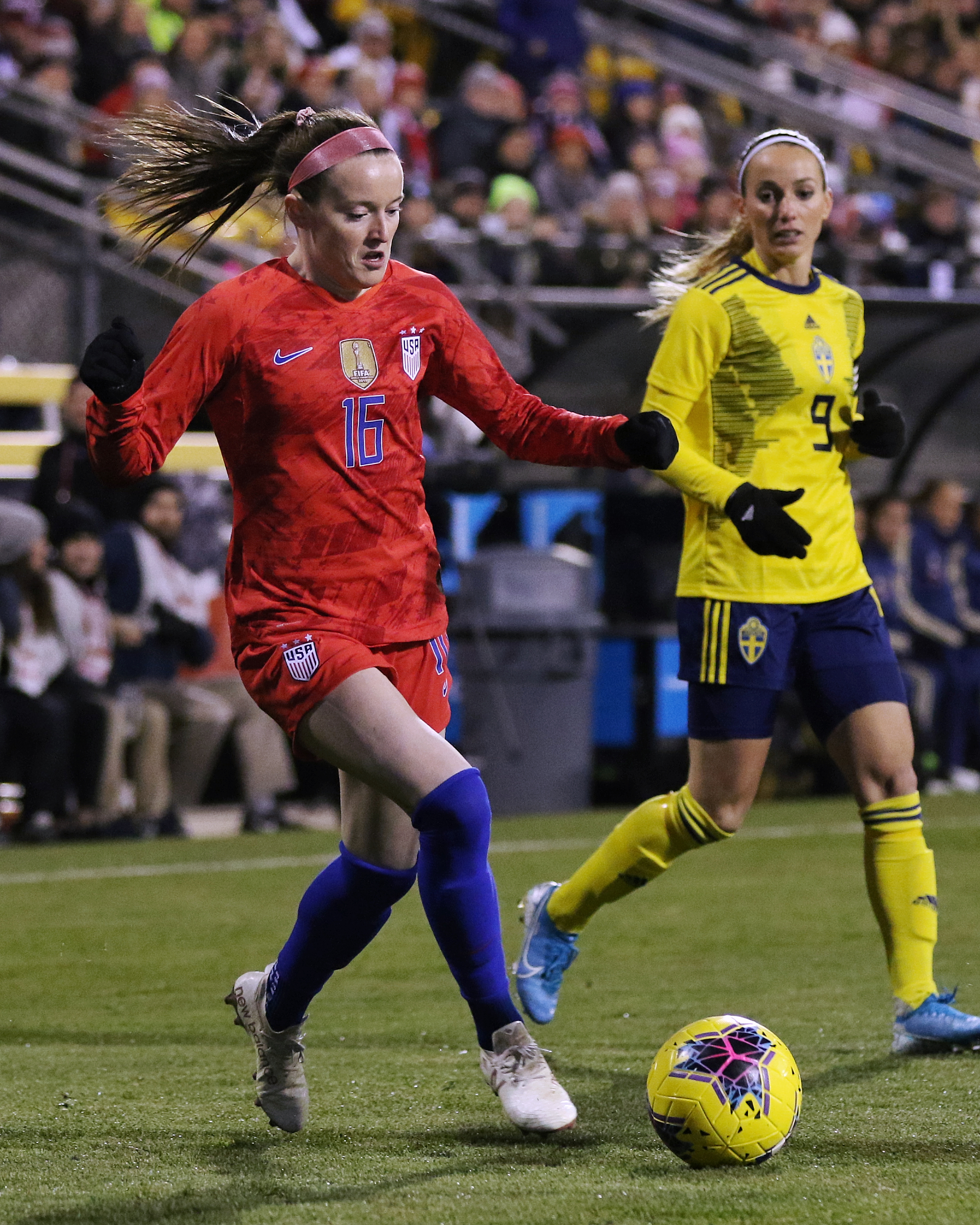
Rose Lavelle, Wisconsin, 2× Big Ten Midfielder of the Year

Big Ten Conference Midfielder of the Year
Season	Player	School	Class	Ref.
2011	Vanessa DiBernardo	Illinois	Sophomore	
2012	Christine Nairn *	Penn State	Senior	
2013	Jordan Jackson	Nebraska	Senior	
2014	Rocky Rodríguez	Penn State	Junior	
2015	Rose Lavelle	Wisconsin	Junior	
2016	Rose Lavelle (2)	Wisconsin	Senior	
2017	Nikki Walts	Ohio State	Senior	
2018	Emily Ogle	Penn State	Senior	
2019	Sarah Stratigakis	Michigan	Junior	
2020	Sam Coffey	Penn State	Senior	
2021	Frankie Tagliaferri	Rutgers	Senior	
2022	Emma Jaskaniec	Wisconsin	Senior	
2023	Justina Gaynor	Michigan State	Senior	
2024	Helena Sampaio	USC	Senior	
2025	Maribel Flores	USC	Junior	
2026	Amanda Schlueter	Ohio State	Senior	

== Defender of the Year (2011–present) ==
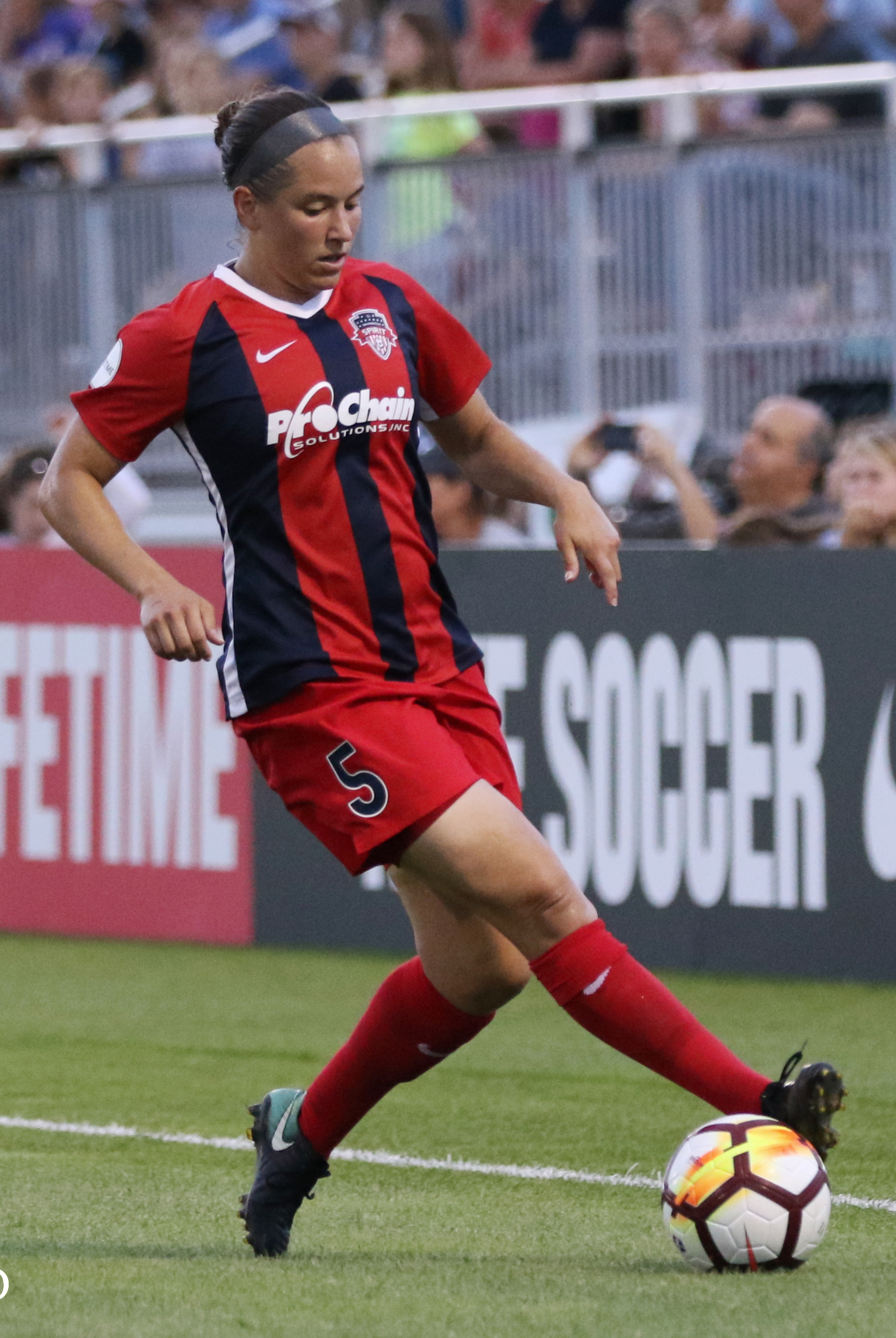
Whitney Church, Penn State, 2× Big Ten Defender of the Year

Big Ten Conference Defender of the Year
Season	Player	School	Class	Ref.
2011	Jenna Carosio	Illinois	Senior	
2012	Whitney Church	Penn State	Sophomore	
2013	Ari Romero	Nebraska	Senior	
2014	Whitney Church (2)	Penn State	Senior	
2015	Erica Skroski	Rutgers	Senior	
2016	Rashida Beal	Minnesota	Senior	
2017	Morgan Wolcott	Ohio State	Senior	
2018	Kaleigh Riehl	Penn State	Junior	
2019	Camryn Biegalski	Wisconsin	Senior	
2020	Izzy Rodriguez	Ohio State	Senior	
2021	Gabby Provenzano	Rutgers	Senior	
2022	Ruby Diodati	Michigan State	Graduate	
2023	Cori Dyke	Penn State	Fifth-year senior	
2024	Lilly Reale	UCLA	Senior	
2025	Kolo Suliafu	Washington	Senior	
2026	Ava Bramblett	Ohio State	Senior	

== Mia Hamant Goalkeeper of the Year (2011–present) ==
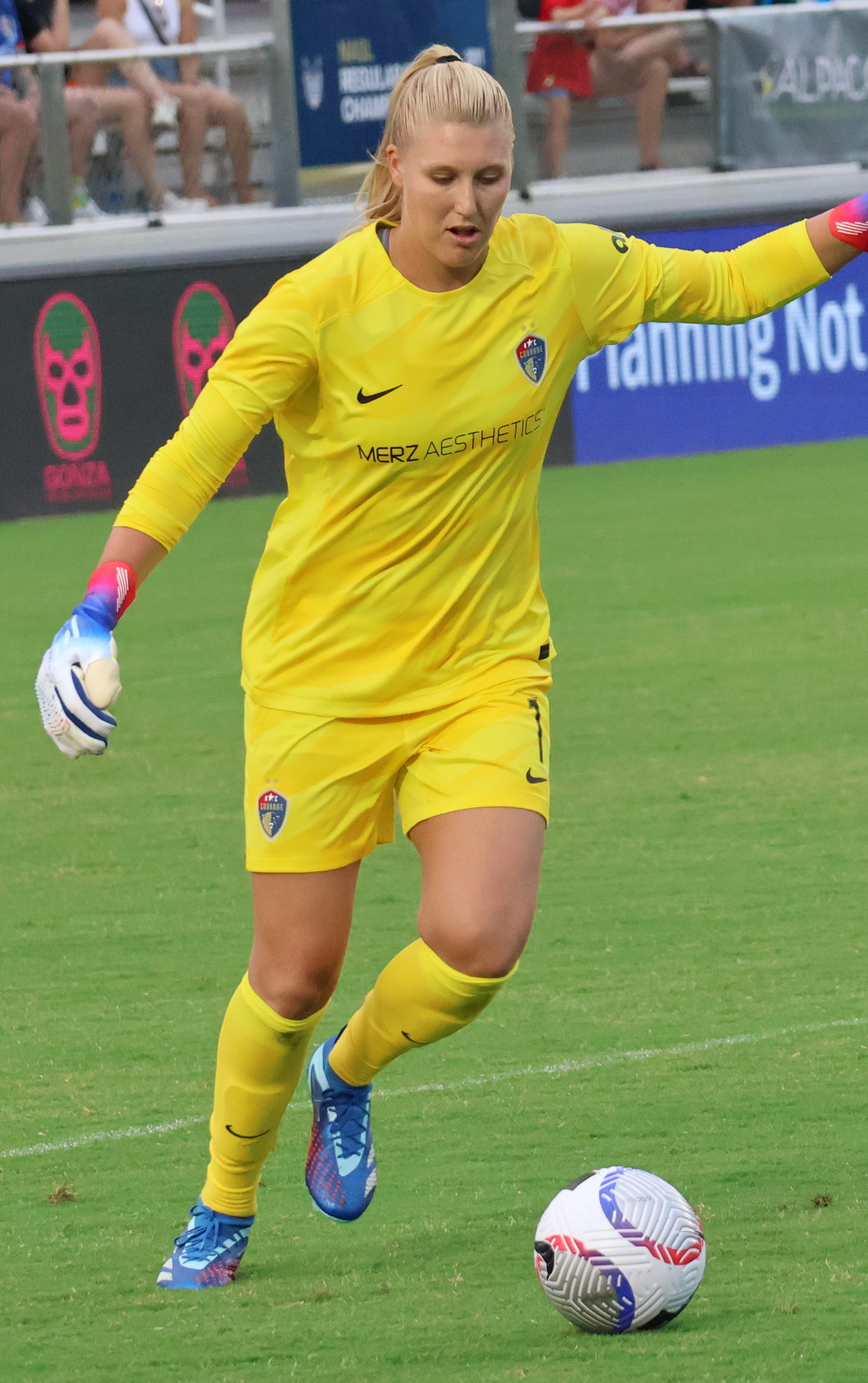
Casey Murphy, Rutgers, 2× Big Ten Goalkeeper of the Year

In 2026, the Goalkeeper of the Year award was renamed in honor of Mia Hamant.

Big Ten Conference Mia Hamant Goalkeeper of the Year
Season	Player	School	Class	Ref.
2011	Michele Dalton	Wisconsin	Senior	
2012	Haley Kopmeyer	Michigan	Senior	
2013	Tarah Hobbs	Minnesota	Freshman	
2014	Genevieve Richard	Wisconsin	Senior	
2015	Casey Murphy	Rutgers	Sophomore	
2016	Lauren Clem	Northwestern	Junior	
2017	Casey Murphy (2)	Rutgers	Senior	
2018	Devon Kerr	Ohio State	Senior	
2019	Jordyn Bloomer	Wisconsin	Junior	
2020	Jordyn Bloomer (2)	Wisconsin	Senior	
2021	Lauren Kozal	Michigan State	Junior	
2022	Lauren Kozal (2)	Michigan State	Senior	
2023	Jamie Gerstenberg	Indiana	Junior	
2024	Laurence Gladu	USC	Graduate	
2025	Molly Pritchard	Ohio State	Senior	
2026	Peighton Northrup	Ohio State	Senior	

== Freshman of the Year (1994–present) ==
Big Ten Conference Freshman of the Year
Season	Player	School	Position	Ref.
1994	Jennifer McElmury	Minnesota	Midfielder	
1995	Tracy Grose	Indiana	Forward	
1995	Jennifer Plante	Ohio State	Defender	
1996	Erica Westrich	Northwestern	Midfielder	
1997	Laurie Seidl	Minnesota	Forward	
1998	Emily Oleksiuk	Penn State	Goalkeeper	
1999	Christie Welsh	Penn State	Forward	
2000	Joanna Lohman	Penn State	Midfielder	
2001	Lisa Grubb	Ohio State	Forward	
2002	Tiffany Weimer	Penn State	Forward	
2003	Ali Krieger	Penn State	Midfielder	
2004	Lara Dickenmann	Ohio State	Midfielder	
2005	Jessica Okoroafo	Purdue	Forward	
2006	Chichi Nweke	Illinois	Forward	
2007	Jessica Stellhorn	Purdue	Defender	
2008	Laura Heyboer	Michigan State	Forward	
2009	Christine Nairn	Penn State	Midfielder	
2010	Vanessa DiBernardo	Illinois	Midfielder	
2011	Taylor Uhl	Minnesota	Forward	
2012	Rocky Rodríguez	Penn State	Midfielder	
2013	Rose Lavelle	Wisconsin	Midfielder	
2014	Emily Ogle	Penn State	Midfielder	
2015	Victoria Pickett	Wisconsin	Midfielder	
2016	Nicole Whitley	Rutgers	Midfielder	
2017	Amirah Ali	Rutgers	Forward	
2018	Meagan McClelland	Rutgers	Goalkeeper	
2019	Ally Schlegel	Penn State	Forward	
2020	Peyton McNamara	Ohio State	Midfielder	
2020	Eva Alonso	Penn State	Defender	
2021	Riley Tiernan	Rutgers	Forward	
2022	Caterina Regazzoni	Northwestern	Midfielder	
2023	Bella Najera	Michigan State	Forward/midfielder	
2024	Nicki Fraser	UCLA	Defender	
2025	Bella Winn	UCLA	Forward	
2026	Lilia Calvert	Rutgers	Midfielder	

== Coach of the Year (1994–present) ==
Big Ten Conference Coach of the Year
Season	Coach	School	Ref.
1994	Tom Saxton	Michigan State	
1995	Sue Montagne	Minnesota	
1996	Dean Duerst	Wisconsin	
1997	Sue Montagne (2)	Minnesota	
1998	Patrick Farmer	Penn State	
1999	Stephanie Gabbert	Iowa	
2000	Tom Saxton (2)	Michigan State	
2001	Lori Walker	Ohio State	
2001	Paula Wilkins	Penn State	
2002	Rob Klatte	Purdue	
2003	Paula Wilkins (2)	Penn State	
2004	Paula Wilkins (3)	Penn State	
2005	Paula Wilkins (4)	Penn State	
2006	Paula Wilkins (5)	Penn State	
2007	Rob Klatte (2)	Purdue	
2008	Mikki Denney Wright	Minnesota	
2009	Erica Walsh	Penn State	
2010	Lori Walker (2)	Ohio State	
2011	Janet Rayfield	Illinois	
2012	Erica Walsh (2)	Penn State	
2013	John Walker	Nebraska	
2014	Erica Walsh (3)	Penn State	
2015	Paula Wilkins (6)	Wisconsin	
2016	Stefanie Golan	Minnesota	
2017	Lori Walker-Hock (3)	Ohio State	
2018	Erica Walsh Dambach (4)	Penn State	
2019	Paula Wilkins (7)	Wisconsin	
2020	Erica Walsh Dambach (5)	Penn State	
2021	Mike O'Neill	Rutgers	
2022	Jeff Hosler	Michigan State	
2023	John Walker (2)	Nebraska	
2024	Jane Alokunis	USC	
2024	Nicole Van Dyke	Washington	
2017	Lori Walker-Hock (4)	Ohio State	

== See also ==
- Atlantic Coast Conference women's soccer awards
- Big 12 Conference women's soccer awards
- Pac-12 Conference women's soccer awards
- Southeastern Conference women's soccer awards
