= 2017 Big Ten women's soccer tournament =

- Classification: Division I
- Teams: 8
- Matches: 7
- Attendance: 3,527
- Site: Grand Park; Westfield, Indiana (Semifinals and Final)
- Champions: Penn State (7th title)
- Winning coach: Erica Dambach (3rd title)
- Broadcast: BTN

2017 Big Ten Conference women's soccer standings
	Conf.						Overall
Team	W		L		T	PCT	W		L		T	PCT
No. 23 Ohio State ‍†‍‍^{y}	9	–	2	–	0	.818	15	–	5	–	1	.738
Northwestern ‍‍‍^{y}	7	–	3	–	1	.682	12	–	8	–	3	.587
Minnesota ‍‍‍	7	–	3	–	1	.682	11	–	5	–	3	.658
No. 22 Rutgers ‍‍‍^{y}	6	–	2	–	3	.682	13	–	2	–	6	.762
#5 Penn State ‡^{y} ‍‍‍	6	–	2	–	3	.682	15	–	5	–	4	.708
Wisconsin ‍‍‍^{y}	6	–	3	–	2	.636	14	–	6	–	2	.682
Purdue ‍‍‍	5	–	4	–	2	.545	10	–	7	–	2	.579
Iowa ‍‍‍	4	–	5	–	2	.455	9	–	8	–	2	.526
Nebraska ‍‍‍	3	–	3	–	5	.500	9	–	5	–	5	.605
Michigan ‍‍‍	3	–	5	–	3	.409	6	–	6	–	6	.500
Indiana ‍‍‍	2	–	6	–	3	.318	6	–	9	–	4	.421
Michigan State ‍‍‍	2	–	8	–	1	.227	6	–	11	–	1	.361
Illinois ‍‍‍	2	–	9	–	0	.182	5	–	14	–	0	.263
Maryland ‍‍‍	1	–	8	–	2	.182	7	–	8	–	3	.472
† – Conference champion ‡ – 2017 Big Ten Tournament champion y – Invited to the NCAA tournament As of November 24, 2017; Rankings from United Soccer Coaches Poll; Source:The Big Ten Conference

The 2017 Big Ten Conference women's soccer tournament was the postseason women's soccer tournament for the Big Ten Conference for the 2017 season. It was held from October 29 through November 5, 2017. The seven-match tournament began with first-round matches held at campus sites, before moving to Grand Park in Westfield, Indiana for the semifinals and final. The eight-team single-elimination tournament consisted of three rounds based on seeding from regular-season conference play. Minnesota were the defending champions, but they were eliminated from the 2017 tournament with a 2–0 quarterfinal loss to Wisconsin. The Penn State Nittany Lions won the title with a 2–1 win over the Northwestern Wildcats in the final. The conference tournament title was the seventh for the Penn State women's soccer program and the third for head coach Erica Dambach.

== Bracket ==
Quarterfinals; Sunday, Oct. 29
1	Ohio State	2^{2OT}
8	Iowa	1
4	Rutgers	0 (3)
5	Penn State	0 (4)
2	Northwestern	1
7	Purdue	0
3	Minnesota	0
6	Wisconsin	2

Semifinals; Friday, Nov. 3
1	Ohio State	0
5	Penn State	1^{2OT}
2	Northwestern	2^{2OT}
6	Wisconsin	1

Final; Sunday, Nov. 5
5	Penn State	2
2	Northwestern	1

== Schedule ==
=== Quarterfinals ===
October 29, 2017	#4 Rutgers	0–0 (a.e.t.) (3–4 p)	#5 Penn State	Piscataway, New Jersey
1:00 p.m. EDT		Report		Stadium: Yurcak Field; Attendance: 225; Referee: Sergio Gonzalez; Assistant referees: Daun White; Alan Robinson; Fourth official: David Bork
	Penalties
	Taylor Aylmer (penalty scored); Alexa Ferreira (penalty missed); Nicole Whitley (penalty scored); Casey Murphy (penalty missed); Amirah Ali (penalty scored); Colby Ciarrocca (penalty missed)		(penalty scored) Emily Ogle; (penalty scored) Brittany Basinger; (penalty missed) Frannie Crouse; (penalty scored) Marissa Sheva; (penalty missed) Charlotte Williams; (penalty scored) Maddie Elliston

October 29, 2017	#3 Minnesota	0–2	#6 Wisconsin	St. Paul, Minnesota
1:00 p.m. CDT		Report	33' Maia Cella; 67' Dani Rhodes	Stadium: Elizabeth Lyle Robbie Stadium; Attendance: 387; Referee: Shane Butler; Assistant referees: Chris Ruska; Kip Jackson; Fourth official: Matt Tiano

October 29, 2017	#2 Northwestern	1–0	#7 Purdue	Evanston, Illinois
2:30 p.m. CDT	Michele Chernesky 88'	Report		Stadium: Martin Stadium; Attendance: 411

October 29, 2017	#1 Ohio State	2–1 (a.e.t.)	#8 Iowa	Columbus, Ohio
4:00 p.m. EDT	Eleanor Gabriel 60'; Sarah Roberts 103'	Report	73' Morgan Kemerling	Stadium: Jesse Owens Memorial Stadium; Attendance: 448; Referee: Josh Kelley; Assistant referees: Jeff Swartzel; Shane Richards; Fourth official: Noah Matos

=== Semifinals ===
November 3, 2017	#1 Ohio State	0–1 (a.e.t.)	#5 Penn State	Westfield, Indiana
1:00 p.m. EDT		Report	110' Laura Freigang	Stadium: Grand Park; Referee: Art Arustamyan; Assistant referees: Khalaf Al-Latayfeh; Dimitar Chavdarov; Fourth official: Peter Dhima

November 3, 2017	#2 Northwestern	2–1 (a.e.t.)	#6 Wisconsin	Westfield, Indiana
3:30 p.m. EDT	Hannah Davison 6'; Maria Fayeulle 105'	Report	65' Lauren Rice	Stadium: Grand Park; Attendance: 1,327; Referee: Peter Dhima; Assistant referees: Khalaf Al-Latayfeh; Jeff Swartzel; Fourth official: Art Arustamyan

=== Final ===
November 5, 2017	#5 Penn State	2–1	#2 Northwestern	Westfield, Indiana
2:00 p.m. EST	Laura Freigang 71'; Haleigh Echard 79'	Report	38' Nia Harris	Stadium: Grand Park; Attendance: 729; Referee: Dimitar Chavdarov; Assistant referees: Art Arustamyan; Khalaf Al-Latayfeh; Fourth official: Peter Dhima

== Statistics ==
=== Goalscorers ===
2 Goals

- Laura Freigang – Penn State

1 Goal

- Maia Cella – Wisconsin
- Michele Chernesky – Northwestern
- Hannah Davison – Northwestern
- Haleigh Echard – Penn State
- Maria Fayeulle – Northwestern
- Eleanor Gabriel – Ohio State
- Nia Harris – Northwestern
- Morgan Kemerling – Iowa
- Lauren Rice – Wisconsin
- Dani Rhodes – Wisconsin
- Sarah Roberts – Ohio State

== See also ==
- 2017 Big Ten Conference Men's Soccer Tournament
