= Paula Wilkins =

American college soccer coach and former player

Personal information
- Full name: Paula Wilkins
- Date of birth: c. 1973 (age 52–53)
- Place of birth: Middletown, Pennsylvania
- Position: Defender

College career
Years	Team	Apps	(Gls)
1991–1994	UMass	53	(4)

Managerial career
- 2001–2006: Penn State
- 2007–: Wisconsin Badgers

Paula Wilkins is an American college soccer coach and former college soccer player. She is the head coach of the Wisconsin Badgers women's soccer team. Wilkins is a former All-American college soccer defender playing 4 years at the University of Massachusetts Amherst. She is a recipient of the NSCAA Coach of the Year award, winning the honor in 2005.

== College career ==
Wilkins played college soccer for the University of Massachusetts as a defender from 1991 to 1994. During her time with the Minutewomen she earned 48 starts, 53 caps, and scored 4 goals. Wilkins was a three-time participant in the NCAA Tournament progressing to the NCAA Women's Soccer Final Four in her senior season. Wilkins was honored with a First Team All-American selection in 1993.

== Coaching career ==
Wilkins began her coaching career in 1994 as an Assistant Coach with Penn State under head coach Patrick Farmer. Wilkins was promoted to head coach of Penn State's team after the position was vacated in 2000. During her tenure as head coach of Penn State Wilkins became one of the fastest ever to reach 100-wins as a coach in women's college soccer, was named NSCAA Coach of the Year and received 5 Big Ten coach of the year awards. Wilkins lead the Nittany Lions to a record of 119–19–11, six straight Big Ten regular season championships, two Big Ten tournament championships, and six straight NCAA Tournament appearances reaching the College Cup twice.

Wilkins accepted the role as Wisconsin's head women's soccer coach in 2007 where she currently coaches.
