= Kerry Abello =

American soccer player (born 1999)

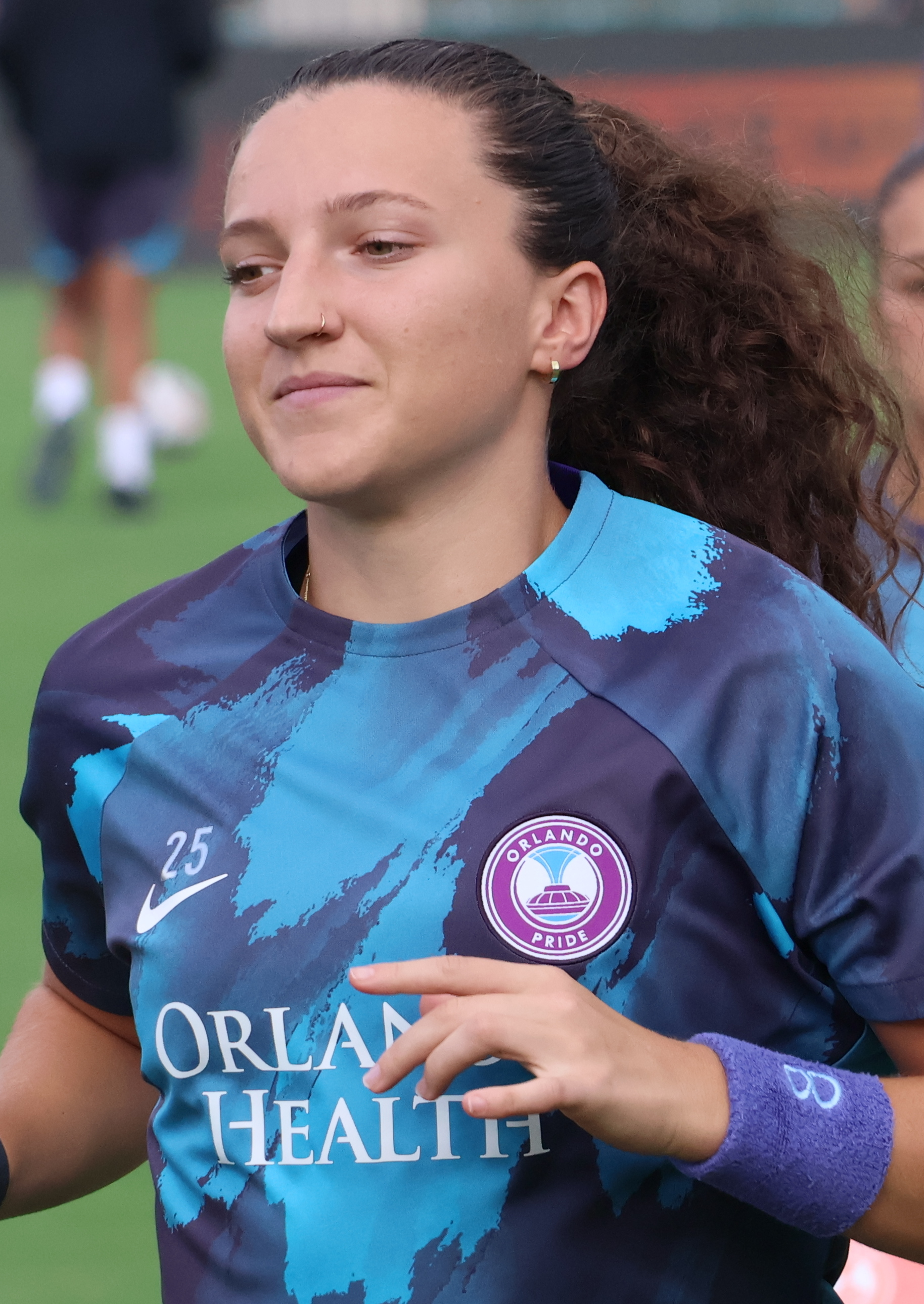
- Abello with the Orlando Pride in 2024

Personal information
- Full name: Kerry Margaret Abello
- Date of birth: September 17, 1999 (age 27)
- Place of birth: Elmhurst, Illinois, U.S.
- Height: 5 ft 5 in (1.65 m)
- Positions: Left back; left winger

Team information
- Current team: Chicago Stars

Youth career
- Team Chicago
- Eclipse Select

College career
Years	Team	Apps	(Gls)
2017–2021	Penn State Nittany Lions	91	(17)

Senior career*
Years	Team	Apps	(Gls)
2018	Chicago Red Stars Reserves		
2022–2026	Orlando Pride	104	(4)
2027–	Chicago Stars	0	(0)

International career^{‡}
2016–2017	United States U18		
2017	United States U19		
2025–	United States	1	(0)
- * Club domestic league appearances and goals as of 03:21, November 8, 2026 (UTC) ‡ National team caps and goals as of June 3, 2025

Kerry Margaret Abello (born September 17, 1999) is an American professional soccer player who plays as a left back for Chicago Stars FC of the National Women's Soccer League (NWSL) and the United States national team. A versatile player, Abello played center-back, full-back and forward during her college soccer career with the Penn State Nittany Lions before being drafted 24th overall in the 2021 NWSL Draft by the Orlando Pride. She won the NWSL Shield and NWSL Championship with the Pride in 2024.

== Early life ==
Born in Elmhurst, Illinois, Abello grew up playing club soccer for Team Chicago and Eclipse Select SC, and also played one year of high school soccer at Benet Academy. She was a three-time NSCAA Youth All-American between 2014 and 2016. Within the 2017 recruiting class, Abello ranked 12th overall and as the no. 2 defender nationally by TopDrawerSoccer.com.

== College career ==
Abello played five seasons of college soccer at Pennsylvania State University between 2017 and 2021 while also studying as a pre-medical major in biological life sciences and Spanish. A high achiever academically, she enrolled in the Schreyer Honors College and was a four-time CoSIDA Academic All-American including CoSIDA Academic All-American of the Year for the 2020–21 and 2021 seasons, the first student-athlete to earn the distinction twice in soccer for Division I.

As a freshman, Abello made 15 appearances for the Nittany Lions all as a substitute and recorded a season-high 45 minutes on August 20 in a game against Hofstra Pride. The team won the 2017 Big Ten Women's Soccer Tournament.

In the 2018 offseason, Abello played a season at center-back with the Chicago Red Stars Reserves in the WPSL. The team topped the Northern Conference and progressed to the playoff semi-finals before losing to Pensacola FC.

Predominantly playing as a forward, Abello became a starter in 2018, starting 19 of 23 appearances, and tallied seven goals and five assists as Penn State clinched the Big Ten regular season title.

Abello with Penn State in 2019

As a junior in 2019, Abello transitioned to playing left-back and started all 24 of Penn State's games, scoring eight goals and three assists on the way to earning First Team All-Big Ten honors. Ahead of the 2020 season, Abello was named as team captain. Having been selected in the 2021 NWSL Draft, she elected to delay her pro career and return in 2021 to contest both the delayed 2020 season and the 2021 season following the NCAA's offer of an additional year of eligibility in light of the COVID-19 pandemic.

For the 2020–21 campaign, Abello moved to playing at center-back, making 12 appearances before missing the final four matches due to injury as Penn State won the Big Ten regular season title for the second time in three seasons. In her fifth and final season, Abello started all 20 games for the Nittany Lions and earned First Team All-Big Ten honors for the second time.

== Club career ==
On January 13, 2021, Abello was selected in the third round (24th overall) of the 2021 NWSL Draft by Orlando Pride. Having returned to Penn State to exhaust her fifth year of college eligibility during the 2021 season, Abello signed a two-year contract with the team on January 28, 2022, ahead of the 2022 season. She made her professional debut on April 3, 2022, as a 61st-minute substitute against Washington Spirit during the 2022 NWSL Challenge Cup.

Abello was the Pride's only field player to appear in all 26 matches (25 starts) in the 2024 regular season as the team claimed the NWSL Shield with the best record in the league. She was named to the NWSL Best XI Second Team. She started in the NWSL Championship on November 23, which the Pride won 1–0 against the Washington Spirit.

In May 2025, Abello became the first Pride player to appear in 50 straight matches. She departed from the Pride in November 2026 after having made 104 regular season appearances across five years.

=== Chicago Stars ===
On November 18, 2026, it was announced that Abello had signed a three-year contract with hometown club Chicago Stars.

== International career ==
Abello has been rostered for the United States national teams at under-14, under-15, under-17, under-18 and under-19 levels. In October 2016 she was called up for the under-18 team to play at the 2016 Women's International Cup in Ireland. She attended three training camps with the under-19s in February, May and June 2017. In July 2017, Abello traveled to Australia to play three matches with the under-18s.

In May 2025, Abello received her first call-up to the senior national team. On June 3, she started in her senior international debut, a 4–0 victory over Jamaica.

== Personal life ==
Abello is the daughter of Kim and Oscar Abello. She has two older brothers and one older sister.

== Career statistics ==
=== College summary ===
Team	Season	Total		
Team	Season	Division	Apps	Goals
Penn State; Nittany Lions	2017	Div. I	15	0
Penn State; Nittany Lions	2018	Div. I	23	7
Penn State; Nittany Lions	2019	Div. I	24	8
Penn State; Nittany Lions	2020–21	Div. I	12	0
Penn State; Nittany Lions	2021	Div. I	17	2
Total			91	17

=== Club summary ===
As of October 2, 2026.

Appearances and goals by club, season and competition
Club	Season	League			Cup (Note: Includes NWSL Challenge Cup)		Playoffs (Note: Includes NWSL playoffs)		Continental (Note: Includes CONCACAF W Champions Cup)		Other		Total	
Club	Season	Division	Apps	Goals	Apps	Goals	Apps	Goals	Apps	Goals	Apps	Goals	Apps	Goals
Orlando Pride	2022	NWSL	21	0	3	0	—		—		—		24	0
Orlando Pride	2023	NWSL	20	1	5	0	—		—		—		25	1
Orlando Pride	2024	NWSL	26	1	—		3	0	—		2 (Note: Includes 2024 NWSL x Liga MX Femenil Summer Cup)	0	31	1
Orlando Pride	2025	NWSL	23	1	1	0	2	0	0	0	—		26	1
Orlando Pride	2026	NWSL	11	1	—		—		—		—		11	1
Career total			101	4	9	0	5	0	0	0	2	0	117	4

=== International ===
As of match played June 3, 2025

National team	Year	Apps	Goals
United States	2025	1	0
Total		1	0

== Honors ==
Penn State Nittany Lions

- Big Ten Conference regular season: 2018, 2020
- Big Ten Tournament: 2017, 2019

Orlando Pride

- NWSL Shield: 2024
- NWSL Championship: 2024

Individual

- CoSIDA Academic All-American of the Year: 2020, 2021
- Big Ten Medal of Honor: 2021
- NWSL Best XI Second Team: 2024
