= Penn State Nittany Lions women's soccer =

Women's soccer team of Penn State University

- 2026 Penn State Nittany Lions women's soccer team
- Founded: 1979; 47 years ago Varsity sport since 1994; 32 years ago
- University: Pennsylvania State University
- Head coach: Erica Dambach (20th season)
- Conference: Big Ten
- Location: State College, Pennsylvania, US
- Stadium: Jeffrey Field (capacity: 5,000)
- Nickname: Nittany Lions
- Colors: Blue and white
Home	Away

NCAA tournament championships
- 2015

NCAA tournament runner-up
- 2012

NCAA tournament College Cup
- 1999, 2002, 2005, 2012, 2015

NCAA tournament Quarterfinals
- 1998, 1999, 2000, 2001, 2002, 2003, 2005, 2006, 2012, 2014, 2015, 2017, 2018, 2023

NCAA tournament Round of 16
- 1996, 1998, 1999, 2000, 2001, 2002, 2003, 2005, 2006, 2011, 2007, 2012, 2014, 2015, 2017, 2018, 2019, 2020, 2021, 2022, 2023, 2024

NCAA tournament appearances
- 1995, 1996, 1997, 1998, 1999, 2000, 2001, 2002, 2003, 2004, 2005, 2006, 2007, 2008, 2009, 2010, 2011, 2012, 2013, 2014, 2015, 2016, 2017, 2018, 2019, 2020, 2021, 2022, 2023, 2024, 2026

Conference tournament championships
- 1998, 2000, 2001, 2006, 2008, 2015, 2017, 2019, 2022

Conference regular season championships
- 1998, 1999, 2000, 2001, 2002, 2003, 2004, 2005, 2006, 2007, 2008, 2009, 2010, 2011, 2012, 2014, 2015, 2016, 2018, 2020

The Penn State Nittany Lions women's soccer is the team that is an intercollegiate varsity sports team at Pennsylvania State University. The team is a member of the Big Ten Conference of the National Collegiate Athletic Association. The Nittany Lions play at Jeffrey Field in State College, Pennsylvania on the campus of Pennsylvania State University.

The formation of a women's soccer program at Pennsylvania State University began with the creation of Penn State Women's Club Soccer in 1977 by the International Soccer Club at Pennsylvania State University. The team's creation was a response to women being excluded from playing on intramural soccer teams at the university. The club would go on to compete in international tours and gain national recognition all while competing without the support of the university. The club began petitioning Penn State Athletics for varsity status in 1980 citing a need for funding and status to continue its operation. After being denied varsity status by the university in 1980 and 1981 Penn State Women's Club Soccer filed a Title IX gender discrimination complaint with the Office of Civil Rights. The team would eventually join the Big Ten Conference and National Collegiate Athletic Association in 1994 when Penn State adopted a varsity women's soccer program under Big Ten direction.

The Nittany Lions have won 30 trophies: 1 NCAA Tournament championship, 9 Big Ten Tournament championships, 20 Big Ten regular season championships. The team has fielded two Hermann Trophy winners: Christie Welsh (2001) and Raquel Rodríguez (2015). The Nittany Lions notable alumnae include United States women's national soccer team players Alyssa Naeher, Ali Krieger and Allie Long who are FIFA Women's World Cup champions.

== History ==
=== Founding ===
The formation of a women's soccer program at Pennsylvania State University began with the creation of Penn State Women's Club Soccer. The women's club was put together as a response to women being excluded from playing on intramural soccer teams by the International Soccer Club, a student run university organization, in 1977. The initial team rostered 30 total women, and played its first matches in a local Centre County town league where they were the only all-female team participating. The club struggled during their inaugural season unable to record a win in league play, but achieving their first victory in the postseason playoffs.

After the club's inaugural season the team planned to schedule a slate of female club opponents but struggled to find willing clubs. It was reported a total of 24 women's club teams were in operation in the East Coast region at the time. Penn State Women's Club Soccer were able to slate a full season of games against other all-women's teams. The scheduled matches featured high school programs and other college club teams.

In the club's first three matches of the season, they recorded a 10–0 win over Franklin & Marshall College as well as 1–0 and 2–0 victories over The Grier School. In the club's first home match of the season the club faced Super F club of New York City, playing the match as a part of a double header with Penn State men's soccer. The club would go on to win the match 4–2, scoring twice in the final six minutes to seal the team's first win at Jeffrey Field. That season Penn State Women's Club Soccer was also able set up the United States' first women's indoor soccer tournament, in which they competed along with six teams from the East Coast region.

Tim Conley, then Penn State men's soccer assistant coach, was asked to accompany the team to a tournament in Alabama at the end of the 1978 season. After the trip Conley was asked to step into the role of Head Coach at the start of the 1979 season. Conley accepted, leaving his paid position with the university for a volunteer role with the women's club. Changes were immediately made to the program, as the new head coach made practices daily Monday through Friday modeled after the varsity squad schedule. With Conley's university connections he was able to secure university provided vans to transport the team to away matches. In his first season as head coach the team went undefeated outscoring their opponents 37–1 in eight games.

Following the impressive 1979 season the club was invited to compete in the Eastern Association of Intercollegiate Athletics for Women Championship Tournament. The Championship Tournament was a regional invitational tournament featuring eight teams, two from New York and one from each of the remaining East Coast states. Penn State, seeded 7th that year, was the only non-varsity sponsored team in the competition. The Penn State Athletics Department sanctioned the trip, officially recognizing the team as an independent university athletics club, provided the team with two vans as well as paying lodging expenses. The club lost all three of its matches, falling to Courtland State, Vermont and Connecticut, finishing 8th in the tournament.

With an elevated recognition Penn State Women's Club Soccer and Tim Conley set a schedule of games mostly consisting of varsity opponents for their 1980 season. The team finished the regular season with eight wins and one loss to Indiana University.

Following the conclusion of the 1980 season the club set up a two-week international tour of England set up by the Women's Football Association. The club scheduled matches against Northwood Ladies FC, Cambridge Pye Ladies FC, and the Notts County Women's Club. On the way the club's first match against Northwood the team met three men on the subway who after chatting with the team decided to come watch the match. When the team arrived the referee and linesmen scheduled to work the match were nowhere to be found. The three men who the team had met on the subway stepped into the role as match officials. The club went on the win the match 6–0 next traveling to Cambridge downing Pye Ladies FC 3–1. The club then traveled to Nottingham to face Notts County Women's Club defeating them 5–0 closing out their tour with a 3–0 record. After the Nottingham match the team was invited out to a disco by the Notts County Women's Club where they met and partied with John McGovern.

=== Title IX lawsuit ===
Penn State Women's Club Soccer began to petition Penn State Athletics for varsity status in 1980 citing a need for funding, status and access to post season play to continue its operation. At that time the club was fully funded by a player fee and a small grant from a university intramural fund. Coaches and staff of the club were unpaid volunteers and travel expenses fell on each player individually.

After being denied varsity status by the university in 1980 and 1981, Penn State Women's Club Soccer filed a Title IX gender discrimination complaint with the Office of Civil Rights in Philadelphia against Pennsylvania State University on March 16 of 1981. The club argued Penn State was in violation of Title IX laws when the university refused sponsorship to a program that had a desire and need for a women's team while simultaneously operating an identical men's program. Head Coach Tim Conley argued the team could not continue on its operation without university sponsorship, citing inadequate medical protection, facilities and coaching salaries. Pennsylvania State University and athletic director Joe Paterno denied the club's claim and stated the decision was based on budget issues and the club being a women's sports team had not been a deciding factor.

The Office of Civil Rights officially initiated an investigation into the Penn State athletic department in April 1981 after it received the club team's complaint letter. The Office was to send an investigator to determine if Penn State's athletic department as a whole, not just for soccer, was in compliance with Title IX requirements. An initial visit from the investigator was scheduled for June 1981 but was delayed due a travel budget shortage at the office. Citing political and legal challenges to Title IX, in August 1981 the Ronald Reagan administration announced it would review Federal Title IX guidelines and put all ongoing Title IX investigation on hold until clarifications to the law were made.

During this time, the Penn State athletic department refused to sign the club team's waiver for postseason play, as they had done the two previous seasons. The waiver certified the team as a university sanctioned club team and allowed the club to compete in the Eastern Association of Intercollegiate Athletics for Women Championship Tournament. The university stated its decision was made because it did not have enough oversight of team operations. The club claimed they believed the university refused to sign because of the Title IX investigation.

The investigation was officially closed in March 1984 after supreme court case Grove City College v. Bell ruled that compliance with Title IX is necessary only in the particular programs or activities that receive federal funding, which Penn State's athletic department did not.

=== Club play ===
After a headlining 1981 season off the pitch, seeing the Nittany Lions file a Title IX gender discrimination complaint against the university, the club finished with a record of eight wins, five losses and one tie. The club did not compete in any post-season play after Penn State's athletic department refused to sign the club's application to the Eastern Association of Intercollegiate Athletics for Women Championship Tournament. The form required a signature from an athletic department official, certifying the team as a university sanctioned club and meeting Association of Intercollegiate Athletics for Women (AIAW) Varsity requirements. Penn State's athletic department had signed for the club the two previous seasons but cited they wanted to know the implications the signature might have in regards to the university's liability for the club, which it had no administrative control or jurisdiction over. In contrast to the public statements the university had supervised certain aspects of the club including academic eligibility as well as making sure the team adhered to AIAW rules. Head coach Tim Conley resigned from his head coaching post at the end of the 1981 season. Conley had cited that he felt he had done his part for the team and that without a salary he could not continue to coach.

After the departure of Tim Conley keeping a consistent face in the head coaching position become an issue for club. As a non-varsity club team coaches were required to be faculty members at the university, this meant professors, graduate students or other university employees already working full or part-time jobs were the only pool the team could draw from. Players shared that many faculty members believed that being an advisor for a club sport was not strategically smart as many saw their time could be used more wisely to advance their academic careers through research grants or writing articles. Additionally, the head coaching position was unpaid and required previous coaching experience and a large time commitment, making it inaccessible to most faculty. While the club struggled to maintain a consistent face in its head coaching position, they also struggled to find varsity opponents and top ranked teams that were willing to play them. After defeating Princeton, a top ranked varsity team, the Tigers refused to face the club again citing a loss to a non-varsity club team could tank a team's season and rank.

The women's club team found cycling through eight head coaches in five seasons through the years of 1982 to 1987. Initially Rich Kilgore, former head coach of Division III Muskingum College's men's soccer program, stepped into the club's vacant head coaching position earning them a 2–2 draw for their first match of the 1982 season. After the first regular season match Kilgore stepped down and assistant coach and Penn State assistant athletic director Rich Lucas was named the interim head coach. That same week the club invited Dan Palumbo to be a guest coach to the team at a training session. Palumbo played college soccer, professional soccer in the Canadian National Soccer League and served as the head coach of the University of Toronto women's soccer program for two seasons. Palumbo was chosen to replace Lucas before the club's second match of the season in which they fell 2–0 to Hartwick. The team finished the season 8–3–4, losing its three matches to nationally ranked varsity opponents. Dan Palumbo resigned at the end of the 1982 season yet again leaving a vacancy in the club's head coaching position. The club selected Sal Frenda, a former high school soccer coach, to lead the team starting in the 1983 season. The club failed to retain Frenda as head coach after the 1983 season and assistant coach Bob Kelly was promoted to head coach for the 1984 season. Yet again, the club could not retain Bob Kelly after the 1985 season, bringing Buddy Hayford, a former high school soccer coach, into the vacant position at the start of the 1986 season. Hayford resigned following the season and was replaced in 1987 by his assistant coach Laurie Pinchbeck, a former women's college soccer player at Bates College and United States women's national soccer team administrator. Finishing their 1987 season with ten wins, two losses and one tie, scoring 11 goals in their final two matches, the club was able to claim their first ten win season since the departure of head coach Tim Conley.

Under the direction of head coach Laurie Pinchbeck the club team reignited their pursuit for varsity status filing a varsity sport proposal with the Penn State athletic department in January 1988. Pinchbeck outlined her belief that the team could become a regional and national powerhouse for the game of women's soccer if the club was allowed to make the jump. The proposal also included a clause specifying that the team would not require equal financial treatment as the men's team right away. Pinchbeck, who at the time was also working for the United States women's soccer team, stated if the team did not receive varsity status by January 1989 she would leave to program for one of the many paid positions being offered to her. Penn State's Assistant Athletic Director Herb Schmidt acknowledged the growth of the sport and agreed that the financial agreement laid out in the proposal may help solve the short-term problem but argued it could potentially impact the future of the program. The athletic department rejected the proposal resulting in the departure of Pinchbeck who was replaced by Denny Hall.

Penn State University's varsity athletic programs joined the Big Ten Conference in 1990. This admittance gave the opportunity for the women's club soccer team to become affiliated with conference opening up the opportunity for regular season conference play and an eventual tournament at the club level. The affiliation with the Big Ten admitted club team as member of the National Collegiate Club Soccer Association, giving the conference club with the best regular season record an automatic bid to the national championship tournament. During this time the club was also able to receive a sponsorship from Puma giving them over $5,500 (equivalent to $13,554 in 2025) to continue their operation. The Nittany Lion club received a bid to the NCCSA national championship tournament, representing the East Region in November 1990 after compiling a regular season record of 14–6–0. The tournament invitation marked the club's first postseason appearance in 9 years. The Nittany Lions traveled to the University of Texas facing off against Baylor, Mankato State and the University of Minnesota in a round-robin tournament. The club fell to Baylor in their opening match 2–0, then securing a 3–1 win over Mankato State, moving on to their final match against Minnesota falling 5–0 and finishing the tournament in 3rd place. At the conclusion of the tournament Brett Hannagan and Caroleene Paul were named All-Americans by the NCCSA.

After the club's first two matches of the 1991 season head coach Denny Hall resigned from his head coaching post citing a need for increased time devoted to his academic duties. Replacing Hall was Andy Nelson, a graduate assistant coach with the men's soccer team with experience playing and coaching. The Nittany Lion club team began competition in the Big Ten Championship tournament in 1991, facing other club and varsity teams whose representative schools were Big Ten members. During the 1991 championships the Nittany Lions defeated Ohio State and Marquette while falling to Purdue in their divisional rounds resulting in the club failing to advance to the semi-final round.

Dirck Aumiller took over the head coaching position after the unexpectedly departure of his former Andy Nelson a few weeks before the start of the 1992 season began. As an employee of club sports at Penn State Aumiller was very familiar with the team and its structure. The club posted a 10–3–1 regular season record in their first season under Aumiller. The Nittany Lions faced Michigan, Purdue and Minnesota in the Big Ten Championship tournament, falling to Michigan 2–1, Minnesota 5–0 and tying Purdue 0–0, failing to advance past the group stage. It was announced a majority of Big Ten schools, including Penn State would adopt varsity women's soccer programs within the next two seasons, subsequently ending the Big Ten Championship tournament after the 1992 competition.

Penn State's athletic department announced in August 1993 that women's soccer would become a university intercollegiate varsity sport at the start of the 1994 season. Athletic Director James Tarman stated the decision was based on the tremendous success of the program on the club level. The club finished their final season as a non-varsity sport in 1993 with a 7–5–1 record.

=== Varsity play ===
Women's soccer became Pennsylvania State University's 29th varsity sport in the fall of 1994. Penn State's athletic department adopted women's soccer after the Big Ten Conference issued a gender equity policy mandating all participating universities have a female athlete participation rate at or above 40% of the total athlete population. In accordance with the Big Ten mandate university administration released a sports gender equity plan that laid out the formation of the varsity team. Penn State president Joab Thomas and his university administration authored the plan. Penn State Women's Club Soccer was dissolved and many of the players were added to the varsity roster. This new varsity status allowed the team to be provided with scholarships, grants and paid coaches. A national coaching search began in 1993 and a full slate of Big Ten opponents were scheduled for the 1994 season.

Penn State women's soccer hired Patrick Farmer as the team's first head coach in January 1994. Farmer had previously coached at NCAA Division III Ithaca College, where he won two Division III National Championships in 1990 and 1991 and was named the 1989 Division III coach of the year. The initial roster consisted of members of the 1993 club team, six recruited freshmen, and athletes from other Penn State varsity sports. One of the freshman recruited by Farmer was Kim Cohen who turned down an offer from No. 2 ranked George Mason University to play on the inaugural Nittany Lions team. The team was projected to place 7th in the Big Ten in their first varsity season.

Penn State women's soccer lost in their inaugural varsity match 4–1 to James Madison University, and additionally fell in their second match, and home opener at Jeffrey Field, 2–1 to Cornell. The team found their first varsity victory in their third match with a 4–1 win over Towson State at Jeffrey Field. The Nittany lions claimed their first victory against a Big Ten opponent with a 2–1 defeat of Indiana. Picking up steam after the squads initial two losses the program went on to win nine matches in a row, shocking No. 8 ranked Wisconsin with a 3–0 upset on the road. The squad finished their inaugural season 14–4–1, finishing in second place in the Big Ten Conference regular season. In their first ever Big Ten tournament appearance the seconded seeded Nittany Lions faced seventh seeded Michigan, the match was sent to penalty kicks when neither team was able to break the 1–1 gridlock after double overtime. Michigan defeated Penn State 3–1 in penalties ending the Nittany Lions tournament run.

Building off of the success mounted in the team's first season the Nittany Lions started hot in 1995, winning the Cornell Classic, recording a five-game win streak and receiving the team's first national ranking. Finishing with a record of 14–6–1 after the Big Ten tournament, the squad received their first NCAA Tournament at-large bid to the 1995 NCAA Division I Women's Soccer Tournament securing a home game against James Madison University, a rematch of the team's season opener. The Nittany Lions fell to James Madison 2–1 ending their run in the tournament.

Penn State women's soccer slated a series of exhibition games in Europe during the summer of 1997. In the team's first match of the exhibition the Nittany Lions faced the England women's national team at Wembley Stadium, taking place before the FA Community Shield Match in front of 40,000 spectators. Penn State became the first American women's soccer team to play in Wembley Stadium and Penn State player Carole Dutchka became the first American woman to score a goal at Wembley Stadium. The Nittany Lions fell to the England women's national team 3–2. During the tour the Nittany Lions also faced off against the Millwall Lionesses in a nationally televised match, defeating the club 4–2. Closing out the tour Penn State participated in an exhibition match in Belgium against the Netherlands women's select team and participated in the S.V. Hemmerden Frauenfussball Tournament in Germany.

The Nittany Lions raised their first Big Ten Regular Season Championship and Big Ten Tournament Title in 1998, finishing their regular season campaign with a 7th seeded automatic bid to the 1998 NCAA Division I Women's Soccer Tournament. The Nittany Lions advanced to the quarterfinals defeating Indiana and Clemson before falling to Florida who would go on to win the National Championship title. The Nittany Lion's quarterfinals finish and No. 6 national ranking marked two new team bests. Head coach Patrick Farmer was named the 1998 Soccer Times National Coach of the Year to cap off the historic season.

Penn State opened up their 1999 season with a tough match against powerhouse No. 2 North Carolina in week 3. Traveling to North Carolina and playing in front of 4,000+ The No. 6 Nittany Lions upset the Tarheels 3–2, snapping North Carolina's 5 year home win streak and handing the team its 7th loss ever at home. Finishing the season the team was able to collect their 100th program win, a Big Ten regular season title and its first ever NCAA College Cup appearance. Penn State found itself in a rematch with North Carolina in the NCAA Tournament semifinal, the Nittany Lions fell 2–0 ending their tournament run and season. Rounding out the season awards Penn State's head coach Patrick Farmer was named United Soccer Coaches College Coach of the Year.

After recording a Penn State single season record 27 goals and 13 assists and winning Big Ten player of the year in her 1999 campaign as a freshman, Christie Welsh made her National Team debut scoring against the Czech Republic in an 8–1 rout in January 2000. Amidst top U.S. players out for wage boycotts after their 1999 World Cup the national team called up the Nittany Lion striker for the Australian Cup and Algarve Cup. Welsh became the first active roster Penn State women's soccer player to play and score in a national team competition. Welsh took a leave of absence from school and college soccer to establish a residency with the United States Women's National Team in Florida to train. With Welsh's return in time for the start of the season the team collected the Big Ten pair of regular season title and tournament title, while becoming the second team ever to go perfect in Big Ten regular season play. The Nittany Loins received an automatic bid to the 2000 NCAA Tournament. At the end of the 2000 season, head coach Patrick Farmer resigned from his position to become the head coach of the New York Power. Penn State forward Rachel Hoffman was selected in the 2001 Women's United Soccer Association supplemental draft, becoming the first Penn State player top be drafted to a top flight women's league.

Patrick Farmer was replaced by Paula Wilkins as head coach at the start of the 2001 season, Wilkins had served as assistant coach under Farmer. In Wilkins' first season, 2001, the Nittany Lions won the Big Ten Regular Season Championship, the Big Ten Tournament Title and made it to the NCAA Tournament Elite Eight. The Nittany Lions were knocked out of the tournament competition after falling to University of North Carolina on an 80th minute failed goalkeeper clearance that bounced off North Carolina forward Alyssa Ramsey's butt and into the goal. After the season, Christie Welsh was awarded with the Hermann Trophy, college soccer's most prestigious award given to the nation's top player, and the National Soccer Coaches Association of America Player of the Year award. Welsh became the first Penn State women's player to win the awards and was the last player to receive both awards (in 2002 the honors were combined into one award). Welsh was also named the Big Ten Player of the Year for the third season in a row as well as Big Ten Athlete of the Year. Penn State defender Bonnie Young and goalkeeper Emily Oleksiuk were selected in the 2002 Women's United Soccer Association draft.

During the preseason of 2002 Penn State forward Joanna Lohman was named the Most Valuable Player in the Nordic Cup while playing for the U.S. Under 23 team. Joanna Lohman paired with Christie Welsh helped the Americans lift the Nordic Cup defeating Germany 3–1. Opening the season ranked 8th in the nation the Nittany Lions were the highest ranked team in the Big Ten. Penn State got off to a tough start to the season with a loss to unranked Southern California but bounced back with an upset victory over then No. 2 UCLA. Penn State went on to win 5 straight mid season but were trounced by Michigan 4–0 then setting up eight straight wins and a Big Ten regular season title. For the first time in team history the Nittany Lions fell in first round of the Big Ten tournament. With a 3–0 lead at halftime Penn State would fail to finish the game falling to Illinois 4–3. Receiving an at-large bid for the 2002 NCAA Tournament the Nittany Lions downed Princeton, Maryland, Virginia and Connecticut on the road to the College Cup. With the team's second ever appearance in the College Cup the Nittany Lions fell to Portland 2–0. At the conclusion of the season Joanna Lohman and Christie Welsh were named All-Americans, Welsh was also named the Hermann Trophy runner-up. Welsh's naming made her the first person in women's soccer history to be named an All-American four times. Christie Welsh was selected 2nd overall by the New York Power in the 2003 Women's United Soccer Association draft.

Opening up the 2003 season ranked 7th in the nation the Nittany Lions scheduled games against seven teams ranked in the final coaches poll of the previous year. Penn State defender Carmelina Moscato was called up to the Canadian National Team for the 2003 FIFA Women's World Cup which would see her initially out of Penn State play. In the team's first match of the season they were upset by No. 21 Florida 2–1 on the road. Shaking off the team's early season loss the Nittany Lions went on to tie No. 2 Santa Clara and string together an unbeaten streak of 8 games. Moscato's returned from World Cup play scoring two goals and three assists in two matches gave a boost to the Nittany Lions and helped Penn State clinch the 2003 Big Ten Regular Season Title. Earning an at-large berth to the 2003 NCAA Tournament as the 5th seed the Nittany Lions fell in the quarterfinals of the tournament to UCLA, 4–0. Joanna Lohman and Tiffany Weimer were named All-Americans following the season, Lohman was also named Hermann Trophy runner up.

The Nittany Lions hired Michael Coll, former head coach of St. Francis women's soccer team, as their new assistant coach before the 2004 campaign to replace two departed assistants. Also during the off season Jeffrey Field, the team's home stadium, received a renovation adding 1,500 more seats, a press box, video booth and a brand new playing surface. Penn State opened its 2004 campaign ranked 4th in the nation, participating in the Husky/Nike Invitational and Connecticut Adidas Classic where they were able to collect wins against No. 8 Connecticut and No. 6 Portland. The Nittany Lions went perfect in Big Ten regular season play finishing 10–0 and falling in the Big Ten tournament final to Ohio State, 2–0. Receiving the No. 2 seed and an at-large bid to the NCAA Tournament the Nittany Lions fell to Maryland 1–0 in the second round of the tournament. Tiffany Weimer was named Hermann Trophy runner up at the end of the season.

Christie Welsh returned to Penn State as a volunteer coach while training for the Olympics during the 2005 season, working as a position coach for forwards. Penn State was ranked 6th in the national polls to open the season, their schedule featured a slate of seven ranked matchups against top 25 teams. The Nittany Lions recorded 19 consecutive wins going undefeated in the regular season, collecting upsets over No. 4 Virginia and No. 3 UCLA. Penn State reached No. 1 in the national rankings for the first time in program history after North Carolina fell to Duke who the Nittany Lions had defeated weeks prior. Tiffany Weimer captured the all-time Big Ten goal scoring record after netting her 83rd career goal against Michigan State. The team collected their 8th consecutive Big Ten regular season title, claiming the No.1 seed in the Big Ten tournament but falling in the first round to Michigan. Penn State received a bid and a No. 1 seed in the 2005 NCAA Tournament. Co-captain forward Ali Krieger was ruled out before the tournament before broking her right fibula in a practice session. Penn State fell to Portland in penalty kicks in the semifinal, defeating Santa Clara, Texas A&M and Bucknell on the way to the College Cup. At the end of the season, head coach Paula Wilkins was named the National Coach of the Year along with Tiffany Weimer being named Hermann Trophy runner up and Ali Krieger, Erin McLeod and Tiffany Weimer earning All-American honors

During the 2006 regular season Penn State fell to No. 15 Illinois snapping a 31-game Big Ten regular season win streak the Nittany Lions built over 3 seasons. Despite the poor start, Penn State was able to claim its 9th consecutive regular season title heading into the Big Ten tournament as the No. 1 seed. Penn State claimed the Big Ten tournament title pushing past Illinois to claim the team's first tournament title in 5 seasons. Receiving an at-large bid and the No. 2 seeded the Nittany Lions advanced to the Elite Eight quarterfinals before falling to No. 1 Notre Dame. Senior Ali Krieger was selected as a first team All-American at the end of the season. Head coach Paula Wilkins resigned at the end of the 2006 campaign after accepting the head coaching position with the Wisconsin Badgers. Wilkins left the program with an overall record of 119–19–11 collecting six Big Ten regular-season championships, two Big Ten tournament titles and two trips to the NCAA College Cup.

Erica Dambach, who had previously served as the head coach of the Harvard women's soccer team, was selected to replace Wilkins in February 2007. Penn State won their first match under Dambach defeating Delaware 2–0 to open the 2007 season at Jeffrey Field. The Nittany Lions went on to claim the team's 10th consecutive Big Ten Regular season title with a regular season record of 8–1–0. Receiving the No. 1 seed in the Big Ten tournament Penn State fell in the semifinal to Ohio State in penalty kicks. The Nittany Lions received a No. 1 seed in the NCAA Tournament, ultimately advancing to the NCAA Sweet Sixteen and finishing the season 18–4–2. At the end of the season goalkeeper Alyssa Naeher was named to the All-American team.

Before the 2008 Olympics Penn State head coach Erica Dambach was selected to serve as a part-time assist coach for the United States women's national soccer team. Dambach returned to Penn State with a gold medal before the start of the 2008 season. Starting goalkeeper Alyssa Naeher stepped away from the team in early September to play in the U-20 World Cup. Naeher was honored with the tournament's best goalkeeper award and helped lift the World Cup trophy for the United States. During the run of the regular season Penn State fell to Ohio State at Jeffrey Field marking the team's first conference loss at home since 1995. The Nittany Lions lifted their 11th consecutive Big Ten regular season title with an 8–2–0 regular season record. Jumping into the Big Ten tournament as the No. 1 seed Penn State claimed the tournament title after defeating Minnesota 2–1. The Nittany Lions were unseeded and placed in the Stanford Region in the NCAA tournament, falling to Rutgers in the first round. At the end of the season goalkeeper Alyssa Naeher was again named to the All-American team.

Before the start of their 2009 campaign the Nittany Lions traveled to Brazil to train against amateur and professional clubs as well as playing futsal and beach soccer matches. Penn State started its 2009 season ranked 12th in the nation with a schedule featuring 6 ranked opponents. Opening the season with an upset win against No. 9 Virginia, the Nittany Lions quickly slumped, losing a program-worst three games straight and going 220 minutes without a goal. Despite the slow start Penn State claimed their 12th consecutive Big Ten regular season championship with a 7–1–1 Big Ten record. The Big Ten women's soccer tournament did not take place in 2009 or 2010. The Nittany Lions received the fourth seed and a bid to the 2009 NCAA Tournament, falling in the second round to Virginia. Penn State swept the conference awards seeing goalkeeper Alyssa Naeher win Defensive Player of the Year award, Katie Schoepfer win Offensive Player of the Year, Christine Nairn win Freshman of the Year and Erica Dambach win Coach of the Year. Two Penn State players were selected in the WPS draft: Alyssa Naeher, was chosen 11th overall by the Boston Breakers and Katie Schoepfer was chosen 26 overall by Sky Blue FC.

During the off season Penn State was unable to sign any recruits to their roster. The Nittany Lions played Women's Professional Soccer club Philadelphia Independence before the start of the 2010 season, falling the club 1–0. Despite a disappointing mid-season 2–6–1 record, Penn State heel turned to finish 8–2–0 in the Big Ten regular season lifting their 13th consecutive Big Ten regular season championship. With the title, the Nittany Lions passed Michigan's women's swimming and diving team for most consecutive Big Ten championships. Penn State received an at-large bid to the NCAA Tournament, falling in the second round to West Virginia.

At the start of the 2011 season a supporters section called the Park Avenue Army was launched by the club to encourage attendance to their matches. The Nittany Lions opened their season with exhibition matches against WPS clubs Philadelphia Independence and Sky Blue FC, falling 5–1 to the Independence and tying Sky Blue FC 0–0. Junior defender Lexi Marton was called up to the Canadian women's national team in September for a series of exhibition games. The Nittany Lions upset No. 7 Virginia midway through the season downing the club 3–2 in Charlottesville. With a regular season record of 9–1 the Nittany Lions lifted their 14 consecutive Big Ten regular season title. Penn State received the No.1 seed in the Big Ten tournament, eventually falling in the championship match to Illinois in overtime. Penn State earned a No.4 seed in the 2011 NCAA tournament, falling in the round of 16 to Wake Forrest. At the end of the season Forward Maya Hayes was named first team All-American.

Penn State head coach Erica Dambach, who also served as an assistant coach to the United States Women's National team, won Gold in the 2012 Olympics before returning for the start of the season. In one of the opening matches of the 2012 season, hosting defending national champion No. 1 Stanford, Penn State set a Jeffrey Field attendance record seeing 5,117 fans in the crowd. Maya Hayes and Taylor Schram returned to the team in late September after winning the 2012 U-20 Women's World Cup with the United States. Finishing the Big Ten regular season 10–0–1 the Nittany Lions lifted their 15th consecutive Big Ten regular season title. Receiving the No. 1 bid in the Big Ten tournament the team would eventually fall in the semifinals to Illinois. Penn State received an at-large, 1st seed bid to the 2012 NCAA Tournament, opening the competition defeating Long Island University Brooklyn. On the way to the finals Penn State would face and defeat Boston College, Michigan, Duke and Florida State. Penn State played in their first NCAA National Championship against North Carolina at Torero Stadium. Tied 1–1 at half North Carolina went on to score three unanswered seeing the Nittany Lions fall 4–1. The Nittany Lions received 5 of 6 possible individual awards from the Big Ten: Maya Hayes named Forward of the Year, Erica Dambach named Coach of the Year, Christine Nairn named Midfielder of the Year, Whit Church named Defensive Player of the Year and Raquel Rodriguez named Freshman of the Year. Nationally, Erica Dambach was awarded with Coach of the Year from United Soccer Coaches and Soccer America; Maya Hayes and Christine Nairn were also named first team All-Americans.

Opening up the start of the 2013 season the Nittany Lions ranked 4th in the nation after coming off a run to the NCAA National Championship final. After some early season lineup experimentation the lions found themselves opening the season with 6–1–1 and ranked ninth in the nation advancing into conference play. Facing off against unranked Wisconsin in the fifth game of the regular season, Penn State fell 1–0 marking their first regular season loss in two years. The season struggles for the Nittany Lions culminated in the team failing to win the Big Ten regular season championship for the first time in 15 seasons. After defeating Wisconsin in the opening round of the Big Ten tournament the Nittany lions failed to make it past Iowa in the second round. Despite the season struggles for the Nittany Lions the NCAA awarded the team a 4th seed in the NCAA Tournament. Penn State topped Monmouth 3–0 in the first round tournament matchup, then facing and falling to Wake Forest 1–0 in the second round. Mallory Weber and Maya Hayes were named to the All-Big Ten first team at the end of the season. Penn State Forward Maya Hayes was selected by Sky Blue FC as the sixth overall pick in the NWSL college draft.

Penn State's Defender Brittany Basinger and goalkeeper Rose Chandler traveled to Canada to participate in the FIFA U-20 Women's World Cup during the start of the 2014 season. The Nittany Lions opened their campaign ranked 24th in the nation, but quickly moved up 17 places in the first two weeks of the season to 7th eventually peaking at 4th. Heading into the Big Ten regular season the Nittany Lions had accrued a 5–1–0 record, losing only to the defending National Champion North Carolina. Penn State lifted their 16th Big Ten regular season championship trophy after completing a 12–1–0 regular season, only falling to No. 20 Rutgers. Receiving the 1 seed for the Big Ten tournament the Nittany Lions fell 1–0 to Northwestern in the first round. Penn State receive a large bid with the 2nd seed to the NCAA tournament. Opening the tournament with a win over Buffalo the Nittany Lions advanced beating both UConn and Virginia Tech eventually falling to Texas A&M in an Elite Eight matchup. At the end of the season Whitney Church was named an All-American, Raquel Rodriguez was named Big Ten Midfielder of the Year and Emily Ogle was named Big Ten Freshman of the Year. Penn State defender Whitney Church was selected 30th overall by the Washington Spirit in the NWSL college draft.

Ranked sixth in the country Penn State took on a tough preseason in 2015 facing Duke, Stanford and others heading into the Big Ten regular season with a 5–1–1 record. Costing through the regular season, the Nittany Lions posted a record of 8–2–1 and secured their 17th Big Ten regular season title. Receiving the first seed in the Big Ten Tournament the Nittany Lions also lifted the Big Ten tournament trophy with head coach Erica Dambach notching her 150th win in the semifinal.

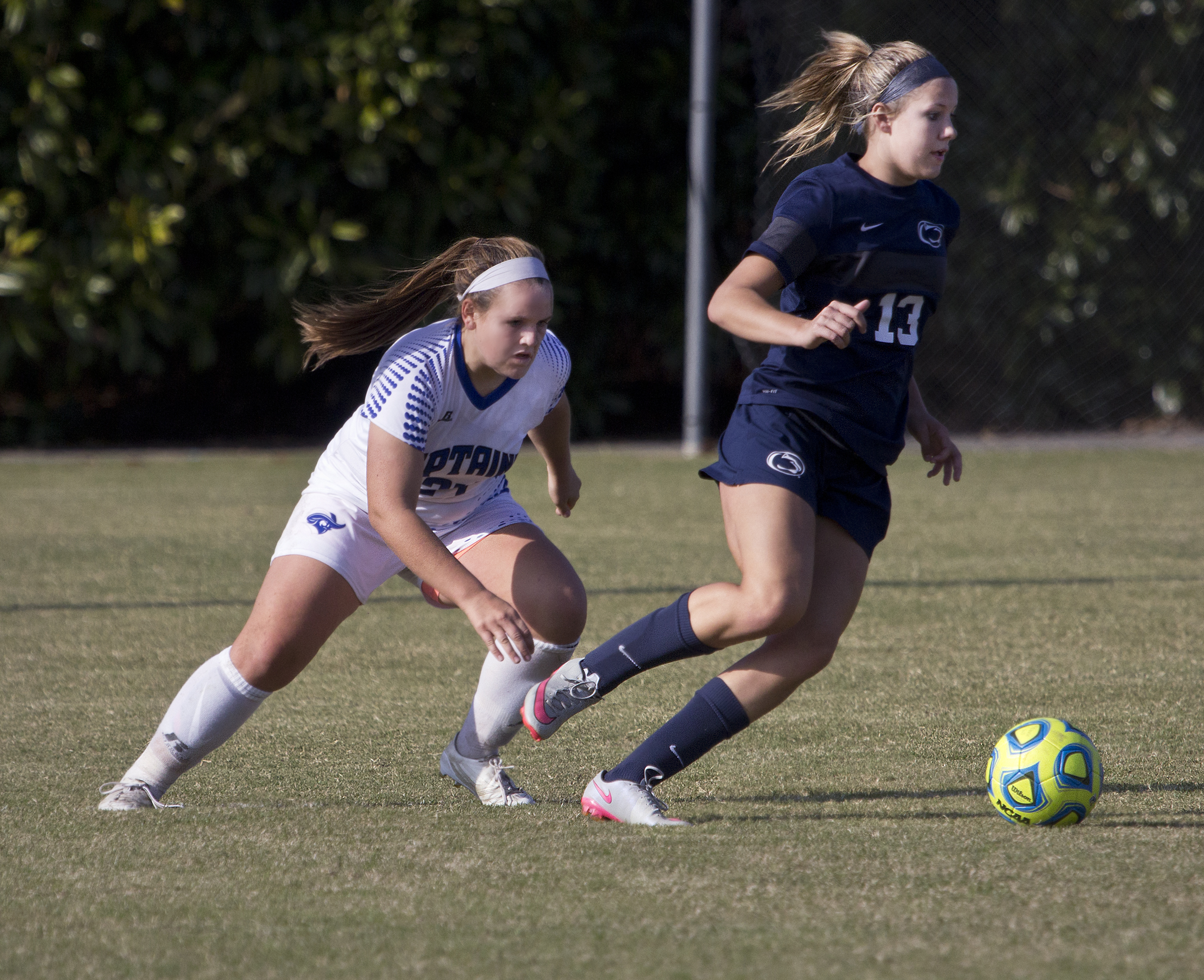
Penn State (blue) v CNU Captains in 2015. That year Penn State won its first NCAA national championship

Penn State won its first NCAA National Championship in 2015 defeating Duke, 1–0 in the final. On the path to the championship the Nittany Lions played 6 tournament matches, defeating Duke, Rutgers, West Virginia, Ohio State, Boston University and Albany while scoring 20 goals and allowing zero in all competitions. At the conclusion of the 2015 season Penn State forward Raquel Rodríguez was awarded the Hermann Trophy, as well as the Top Drawer Soccer Player of the Year. Also receiving the sport's highest coaching honor, Erica Dambach was named NSCAA Coach of the Year. Penn State players selected that year in the NWSL draft were Raquel Rodriguez 2nd overall by Sky Blue FC, Mallory Weber 14th overall by Western New York Flash and Britt Eckerstrom 26th by Western New York Flash.

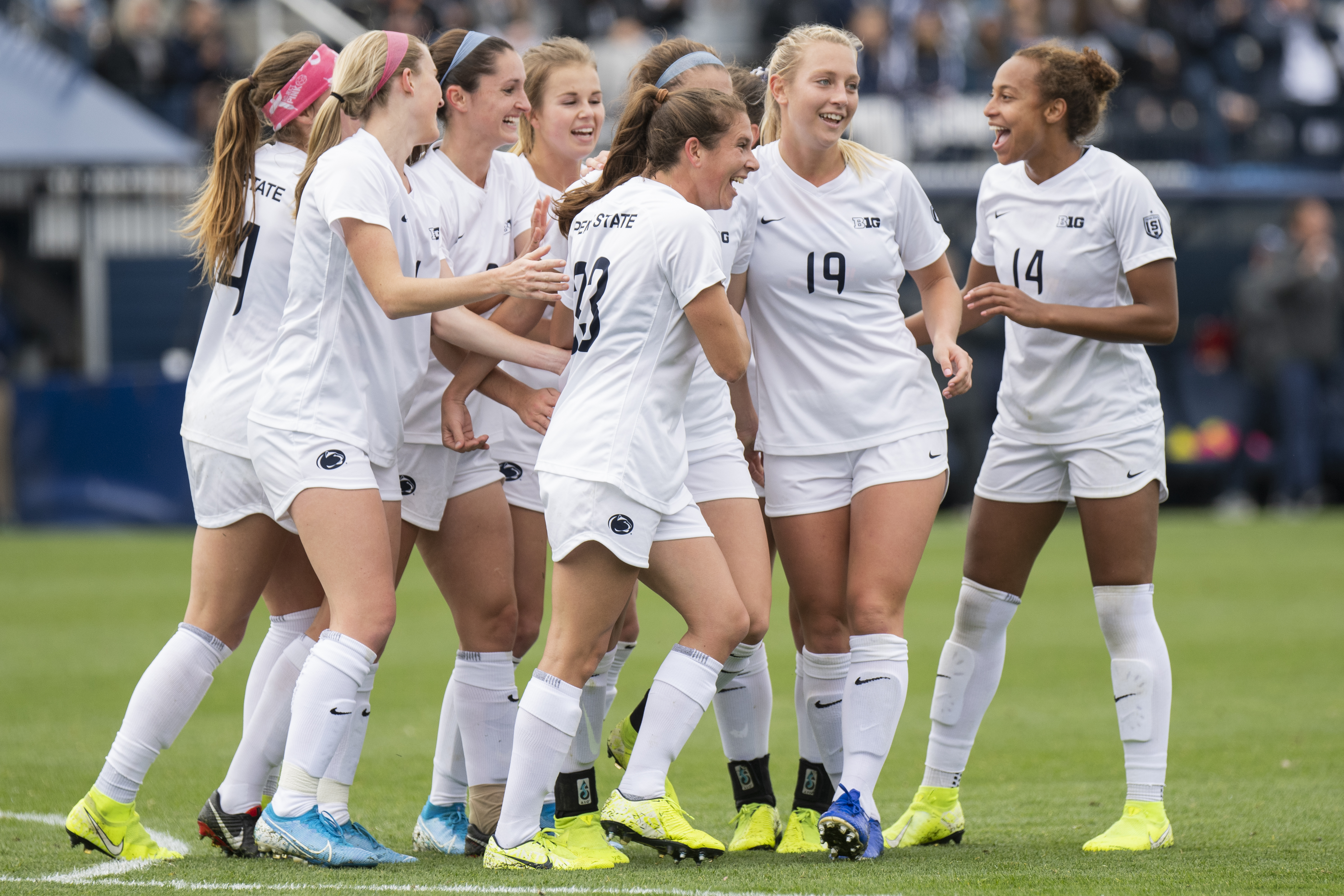
Penn State women's soccer celebrate after scoring a goal during the match against Northwestern on Sunday, Oct. 20, 2019 at Jeffrey Field in State College, Pa.

Defending National Champions Penn State opened the 2016 season ranked 2nd in the nation with a slate of non-conference games; Collecting wins against Hofsta, San Diego State and La Salle, drawing a ranked West Virginia team and falling to ranked opponents BYU and UCLA. Finishing with a regular season record of 7–1–3 the Nittany Lions were able to secure a piece of the three team shared regular season title with Minnesota and Northwestern. Penn State fell to Rutgers 2–0 in their opening match of Big Ten tournament. The Nittany Lions opened up NCAA Tournament play with a 6–0 win against Bucknell eventually falling in their next match 3–0 to No. 3 Virginia. At the end of the season Penn State Midfielder Nickolette Driesse was selected 32nd overall in the NWSL draft by the Orlando Pride.

== Uniforms, crest and colors ==
The Penn State women's team wears Nike kits featuring the school's navy and white colors and displays a crest on their uniforms which is unique to them.

The team's crest, released in 2016, features the team's navy and white colors with three navy blue vertical stripes and a centered navy blue "block S" under the Penn State athletics wordmark. In the navy blue bottom outer of the crest the year 1994 is displayed referencing the year the team became a varsity sports program. The design also features a star above the crest representing the Nittany Lion's 2015 NCAA National Championship.

The team's home kit consists of a white top featuring a small polka dot pattern made up of the team's crest, white shorts and white socks. The top features a Nike logo and Big Ten logo adjacent on the chest area with the Penn State wordmark and player numbers on the chest, all in navy. Inside of the collar in the phrase "We Are" is printed in navy blue. The back of the top features player numbers in navy.

The team's away kit consists of a navy top, navy shorts and navy socks. The top features a Nike logo and Big Ten logo adjacent on the chest area with player numbers on the lower chest, all in white. The back of the top features the Penn State wordmark above player numbers, both in white. The top's left sleeve features the team's crest.

The team's goalkeeper kit consists of a purple top, purple shorts and purple socks. The top features a Big Ten logo on the right chest area above a Penn State wordmark and player numbers on the lower chest, all in white. The back of the top features player numbers in white.

== Stadium ==
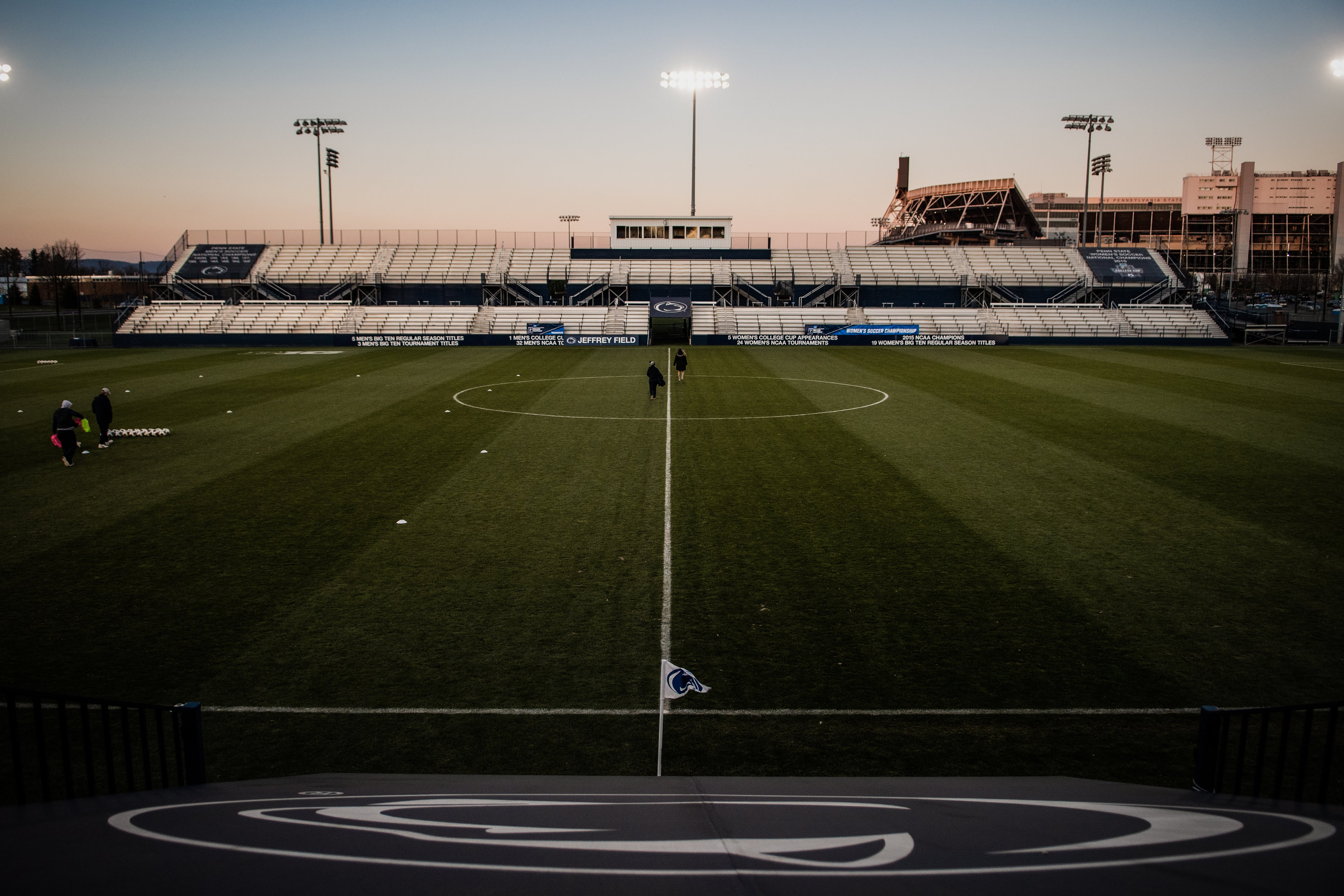
Jeffrey Field before the NCAA Tournament first round match against Stony Brook Women's Soccer on Friday, Nov. 15, 2019.

The Nittany Lions play at Jeffrey Field, a 5,000-seat stadium that opened in 1972. The stadium was dedicated to Bill Jeffrey, who was the men's soccer team's head coach from 1926 until 1952. The stadium was originally built as a home for soccer and lacrosse. The stadium opened with an initial seating capacity of 2,500, but was later increased to 3,000 in 1978 and again increased to 5,000 in 2004 renovation that also added a press box. The stadium is located at the corner of East Park Avenue and University Drive in University Park, Pennsylvania. The stadium's record attendance was achieved on August 19, 2016, when Penn State women's soccer faced West Virginia admitting 5,791 fans to the match.

== Supporters ==
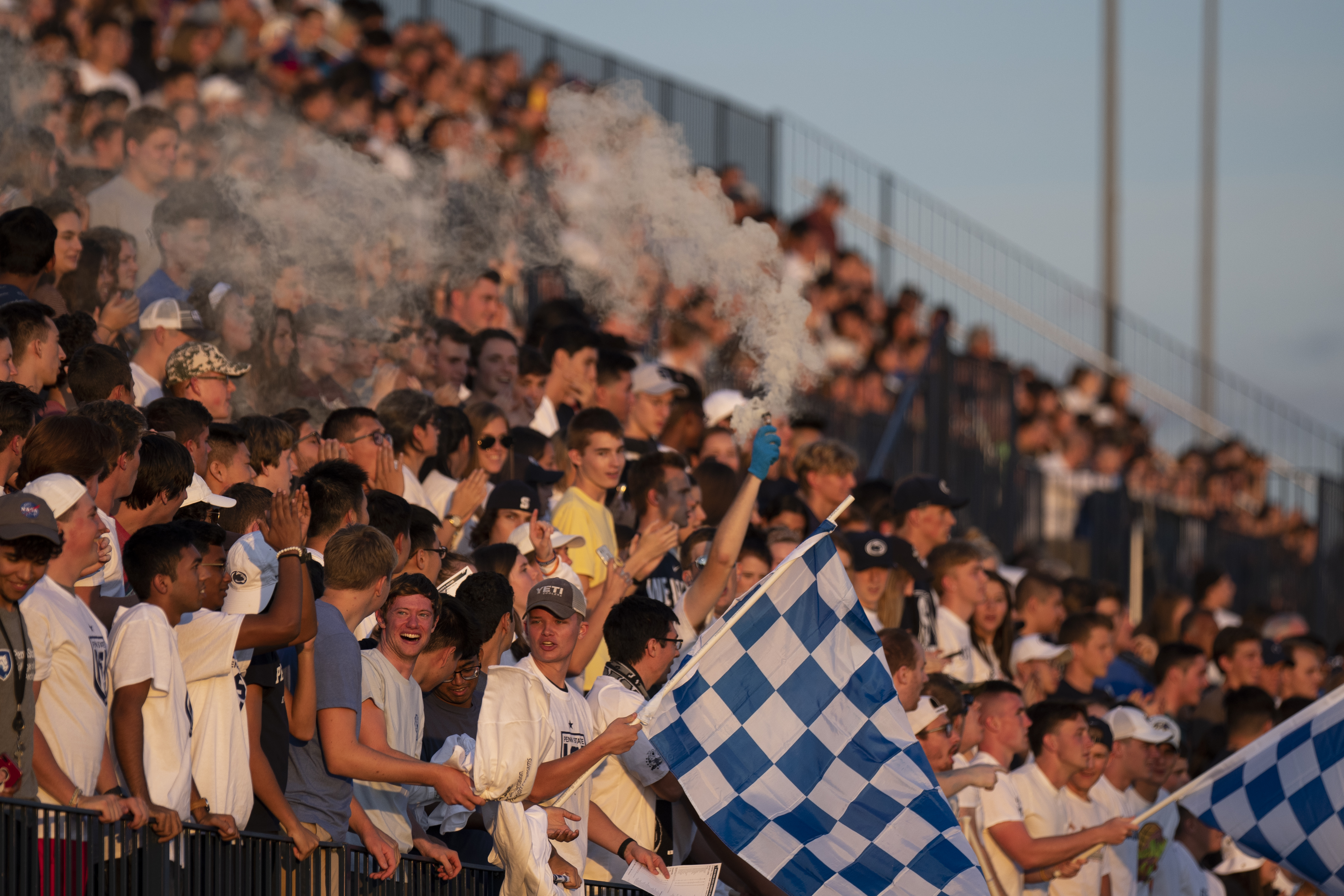
The Park Avenue Army celebrate a goal during the match against No. 3 Stanford on Friday, August 23, 2019, at Jeffrey Field in State College, PA.

Park Avenue Army is a supporters group for Penn State men's soccer and Penn State women's soccer. The group was formed as two separate groups, Park Avenue Army and Sons of Jeffrey in 2011 and 2015 respectively. The groups were formally combined under one banner and leadership in 2019. Members occupy the northwest stand of Jeffrey Field during home matches.

The Park Avenue Army engages in many of the traditional Penn State chants including the "We Are" chant, Zombie Nation as well other American soccer chants like "I Believe That We Will Win".

Loosely organized supporters' sections had existed at Jeffrey Field before the organizing of any formal group. A group of note was a collection of fans who called themselves the Hertzog's Hooligans after Penn State player Corey Hertzog. The fans would attend home matches with a banner displaying their group's name and sing traditional English football chants. It wasn't until 2011 when a group of students chose to create an official supporters' section with leadership.

The Park Avenue Army was founded as a Supporters' groups for Penn State Nittany Lions women's soccer team in 2011. The group was named after Park Avenue the street at which Jeffrey Field is located. Penn State women's soccer assistant coach Tim Wassell lead the formation by recruiting a group of freshmen leaders and student members. The initial goal of the group was to get freshmen in East Halls engaged in attending matches as their dorms are across the street from Jeffrey Field.

== Roster ==
As of 8 Sep 2024

Note: Flags indicate national team as defined under FIFA eligibility rules; some limited exceptions apply. Players may hold more than one non-FIFA nationality.

No.	Pos.	Nation	Player
00	GK	USA	Amanda Poorbaugh
1	GK	USA	Mackenzie Gress
2	MF	USA	Molly Martin
3	MF	USA	Olivia Damico
4	DF	USA	Kayleigh Herr
5	DF	USA	Keegan Schmeiser
6	GK	USA	Kealey Titmuss
7	FW	USA	Amelia White
8	FW	USA	Jolie Farmer
9	FW	USA	Nicollette Kiorpes
10	MF	USA	Olivia Borgen
11	MF	USA	Jordan Fusco
12	DF	USA	Bella Ayscue
14	FW	USA	Kaitlyn MacBean
15	MF	USA	Devon Olive

No.	Pos.	Nation	Player
16	FW	USA	Awbrey Culpa
17	MF	USA	Ava Minnier
18	DF	USA	Kaelyn Wolfe
19	MF	USA	Katie Scott
20	MF	USA	Natalie Magnotta
21	FW	USA	Frankee Flesher
22	MF	USA	Rowan Lapi
24	FW	USA	Elle Kershner
25	DF	GER	Mieke Schiemann
27	FW	IRL	Rebecca Cooke
28	DF	USA	Ginger Fontenot
26	DF	USA	Kara Ogden
30	FW	USA	Addison Hess
31	MF	USA	Julia Raich
32	MF	USA	Natalie Wilson

== Yearly records ==
Season	Coach	Overall	Conference	Standing	Postseason
Patrick Farmer (Big Ten Conference) (1994–2000)
1994	Patrick Farmer	14–4–1	5–2–0	2nd	
1995	Patrick Farmer	15–7–1	4–2–1	3rd	NCAA First Round
1996	Patrick Farmer	15–5–2	5–1–1	2nd	NCAA Sweet Sixteen
1997	Patrick Farmer	15–7–1	6–2–1	3rd	NCAA First Round
1998	Patrick Farmer	21–4–1	7–1–1	1st	NCAA Elite Eight
1999	Patrick Farmer	21–4–1	9–0–1	1st	NCAA College Cup
2000	Patrick Farmer	22–3–1	10–0–0	1st	NCAA Elite Eight
Patrick Farmer:		123–34–8	46–8–5		
Paula Wilkins (Big Ten Conference) (2001–2006)
2001	Paula Wilkins	21–4–1	8–1–1	1st	NCAA Elite Eight
2002	Paula Wilkins	19–4–1	9–1–0	1st	NCAA College Cup
2003	Paula Wilkins	19–3–3	9–1–0	1st	NCAA Elite Eight
2004	Paula Wilkins	19–3–1	10–0–0	1st	NCAA Second Round
2005	Paula Wilkins	23–0–2	10–0–0	1st	NCAA College Cup
2006	Paula Wilkins	18–5–3	8–1–1	1st	NCAA Elite Eight
Paula Wilkins:		119–19–11	54–4–2		
Erica Dambach (Big Ten Conference) (2007–present)
2007	Erica Walsh	18–4–2	9–1–0	1st	NCAA Sweet Sixteen
2008	Erica Walsh	16–8–0	8–2–0	1st	NCAA First Round
2009	Erica Walsh	13–6–2	8–1–1	1st	NCAA Second Round
2010	Erica Walsh	11–9–1	8–2–0	1st	NCAA Second Round
2011	Erica Walsh	21–5–0	10–1–0	1st	NCAA Sweet Sixteen
2012	Erica Walsh	21–4–2	10–0–1	1st	NCAA Runner-Up
2013	Erica Walsh	15–7–1	7–4–0	3rd	NCAA Second Round
2014	Erica Walsh	20–4–0	12–1–0	1st	NCAA Elite Eight
2015	Erica Walsh	22–3–2	8–2–1	1st	NCAA Champions
2016	Erica Dambach	12–5–4	7–1–3	T-1st	NCAA Second Round
2017	Erica Dambach	15–5–4	6–2–3	T-4th	NCAA Elite Eight
2018	Erica Dambach	18–6–1	9–2–0	1st	NCAA Elite Eight
2019	Erica Dambach	17–7–1	8–3–0	4th	NCAA Sweet Sixteen
2020	Erica Dambach	12–3–1	9–1–1	1st	NCAA Sweet Sixteen
2021	Erica Dambach	12–8–1	5–5–0	6th	NCAA Sweet Sixteen
2022	Erica Dambach	15–5–3	5–3–2	6th	NCAA Sweet Sixteen
2023	Erica Dambach	16–3–4	6–1–3	4th	NCAA Elite Eight
2024	Erica Dambach	15–6–3	5–4–2	10th	NCAA Elite Eight
2025	Erica Dambach	10–8–3	5–4–2	T-6th	NCAA Second Round
2026	Erica Dambach	9–4–5	7–2–3	T-5th	NCAA
Erica Dambach:		339–135–38	145–40–19		
Total:		581–188–57			
National champion Postseason invitational champion Conference regular season champion Conference regular season and conference tournament champion Division regular season champion Division regular season and conference tournament champion Conference tournament champion

As of November 20, 2026

== Honors ==
Team Awards
Competitions	Titles	Seasons
NCAA National Championship	1	2015
Big Ten Tournament	9	1998, 2000, 2001, 2006, 2008, 2015, 2017, 2019, 2022
Big Ten Regular Season	20	1998, 1999, 2000, 2001, 2002, 2003, 2004, 2005, 2006, 2007, 2008, 2009, 2010, 2011, 2012, 2014, 2015, 2016, 2018, 2020
Individual Awards
Honor	Wins	Recipient & Season
Hermann Trophy	2	Christie Welsh (2001), Raquel Rodríguez (2015)
United Soccer Coaches Player of the Year	1	Christie Welsh (2001)
Top Drawer Soccer Player of the Year	1	Raquel Rodríguez (2015)
Top Drawer Soccer Rookie of the Year	1	Christine Nairn (2009)
United Soccer Coaches Coach of the Year	4	Patrick Farmer (1999), Paula Wilkins (2005), Erica Dambach (2012, 2015)
Soccer America Coach of the Year	3	Patrick Farmer (1999), Paula Wilkins (2005), Erica Dambach (2012)
First Team All American	26	Kelly Convey (1998), Emily Oleksiuk (1999, 2000, 2001), Christie Welsh (1999, 2000, 2001), Joanna Lohman (2001, 2002, 2003) Tiffany Weimer (2003, 2004, 2005), Natalie Jacobs (2004), Ali Krieger (2005, 2006), Erin McLeod (2005), Alyssa Naeher (2007, 2008), Maya Hayes (2011, 2012), Christine Nairn (2012), Whitney Church (2014), Raquel Rodríguez (2015), Kaleigh Riehl (2018), Ally Schlegel (2020),
Top Drawer Soccer National Collegiate First Team	8	Christine Nairn (2010, 2012), Maya Hayes (2011, 2012, 2013), Raquel Rodríguez (2015), Emily Ogle (2018), Kaleigh Riehl (2019)
Collegiate MVP First Team	12	Christie Welsh (1999, 2000, 2001), Joanna Lohman (2002, 2003), Erin McLeod (2004, 2005), Tiffany Weimer (2004, 2005), Ali Krieger (2006), Maya Hayes (2011), Christine Nairn (2012)
Big Ten Female Athlete of the Year	2	Christie Welsh (2001–02), Tiffany Weimer (2005–06)
Big Ten Player of the Year	4	Christie Welsh (1999, 2000, 2001), Joanna Lohman (2003)
Big Ten Defensive Player of the Year	9	Natalie Jacobs (2004), Lindsay Bach (2005), Ali Krieger (2006), Alyssa Naeher (2007, 2009), Whitney Church (2012, 2014), Kaleigh Riehl (2018), Cori Dyke (2023)
Big Ten Offensive Player of the Year	5	Tiffany Weimer (2004, 2005), Katie Schoepfer (2009), Maya Hayes (2001, 2012)
Big Ten Midfielder of the Year	3	Christine Nairn (2012), Raquel Rodríguez (2014), Emily Ogle (2018)
Big Ten Freshman of the Year	9	Emily Oleksiuk (1998), Christine Welsh (1999), Joanna Lohman (2000), Tiffany Weimer (2002), Ali Krieger (2003), Christine Nairn (2009), Raquel Rodríguez (2012), Emily Ogle (2014), Ally Schlegel (2019)
Big Ten Coach of the Year	10	Patrick Farmer (1998), Paula Wilkins (2001, 2003, 2004, 2005, 2006), Erica Dambach (2009, 2012, 2014, 2018)

Last updated: May 20, 2021
Source: Penn State Athletics

== Records ==
=== Single season ===
Goals
#	Name	Season	Total
1	(United States) Tiffany Weimer	2005	32
2	(United States) Maya Hayes	2011	31
3	(United States) Christie Welsh	1999	27
4	(United States) Tiffany Weimer	2004	26
5	(United States) Christie Welsh	2001	25

Assists
1	(United States) Christie Welsh	2001	18
2	(United States) Joanna Lohman	2001	14
3	(United States) Christine Nairn	2011	13
3	(United States) Christie Welsh	2002	13
3	(United States) Christie Welsh	1999	13

Saves
1	(United States) Emily Oleksiuk	1998	132
2	(United States) Emily Oleksiuk	2001	115
3	(United States) Robyn Van Praag	2011	109
4	(United States) Dara Christante	2002	107
4	(United States) Dara Christante	1999	107

Last updated: May 20, 2021
Source: Penn State Athletics

=== Career ===
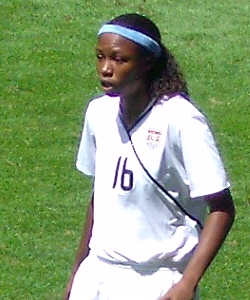
Maya Hayes is the 3rd. all-time topscorer with 71 goals

Goals
#	Name	Years	Total
1	(United States) Tiffany Weimer	2002–2005	91
2	(United States) Christie Welsh	1999–2002	82
3	(United States) Maya Hayes	2010–2013	71
4	(United States) Rachel Hoffman	1994–1997	58
5	(United States) Heidi Drummond	2000–2003	56
6	(United States) Ally Schlegel	2019–2022	49
7	(United States) Katie Schoepfer	2006–2009	48
8	(United States) Carole Dutchka	1995–1998	44
9	(United States) Joanna Lohman	2000–2003	41
10	(United States) Danielle Toney	2007–2010	38

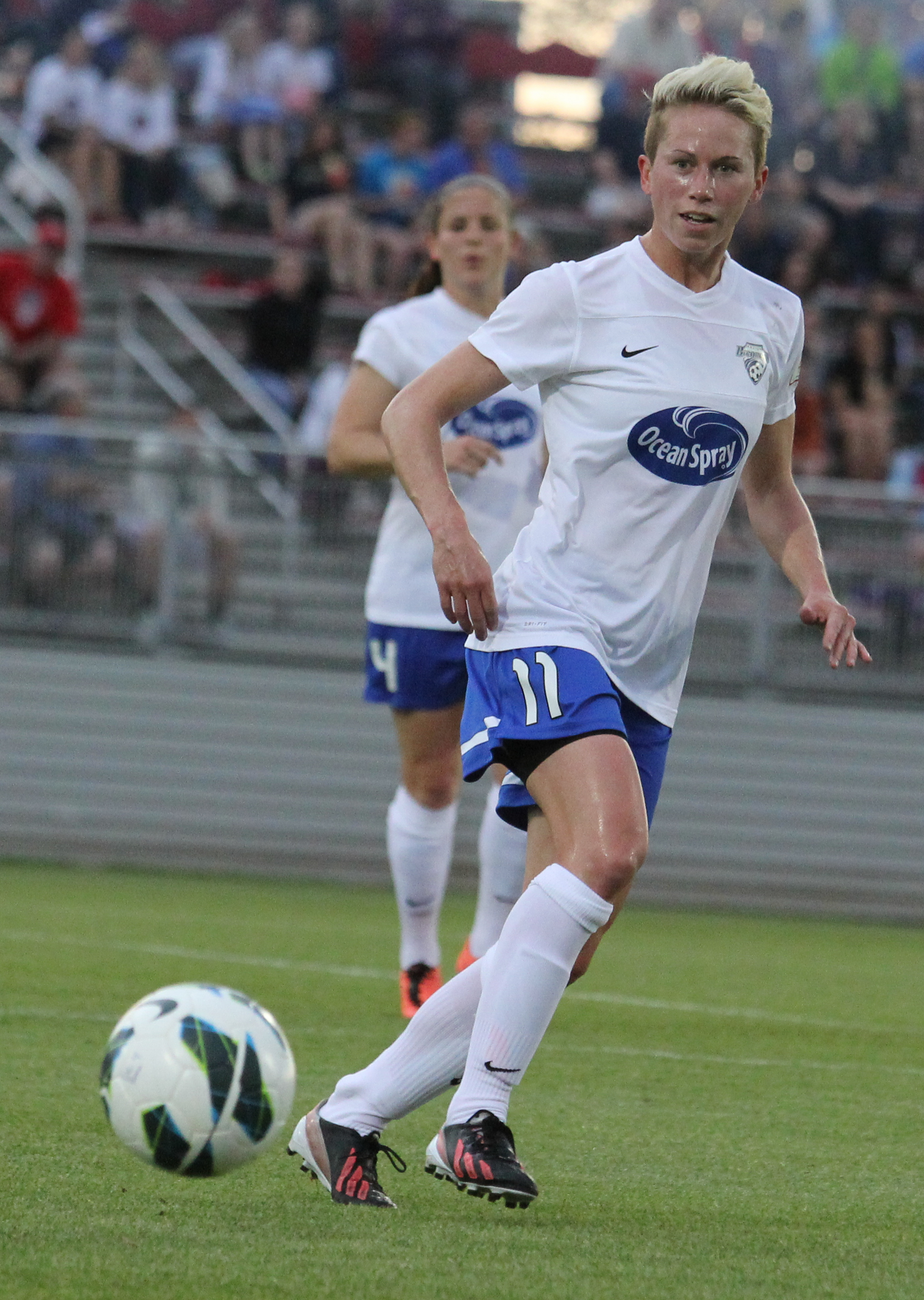
Joanna Lohman, the 3rd. most assistant player in Penn State history

Assists
1	(United States) Christie Welsh	1999–2002	52
2	(United States) Christine Nairn	2009–2012	41
3	(United States) Joanna Lohman	2000–2003	37
4	(United States) Tiffany Weimer	2002–2005	32
5	(United States) Rachel Hoffman	1994–1997	31
6	(United States) Sam Coffey	2019–2021	30
7	(United States) Stephanie Smith	2000–2003	29
7	(United States) Mallory Weber	2012–2015	29
9	(United States) Emily Hurd	2010–2014	28
9	(Costa Rica) Raquel Rodríguez	2012–2015	28

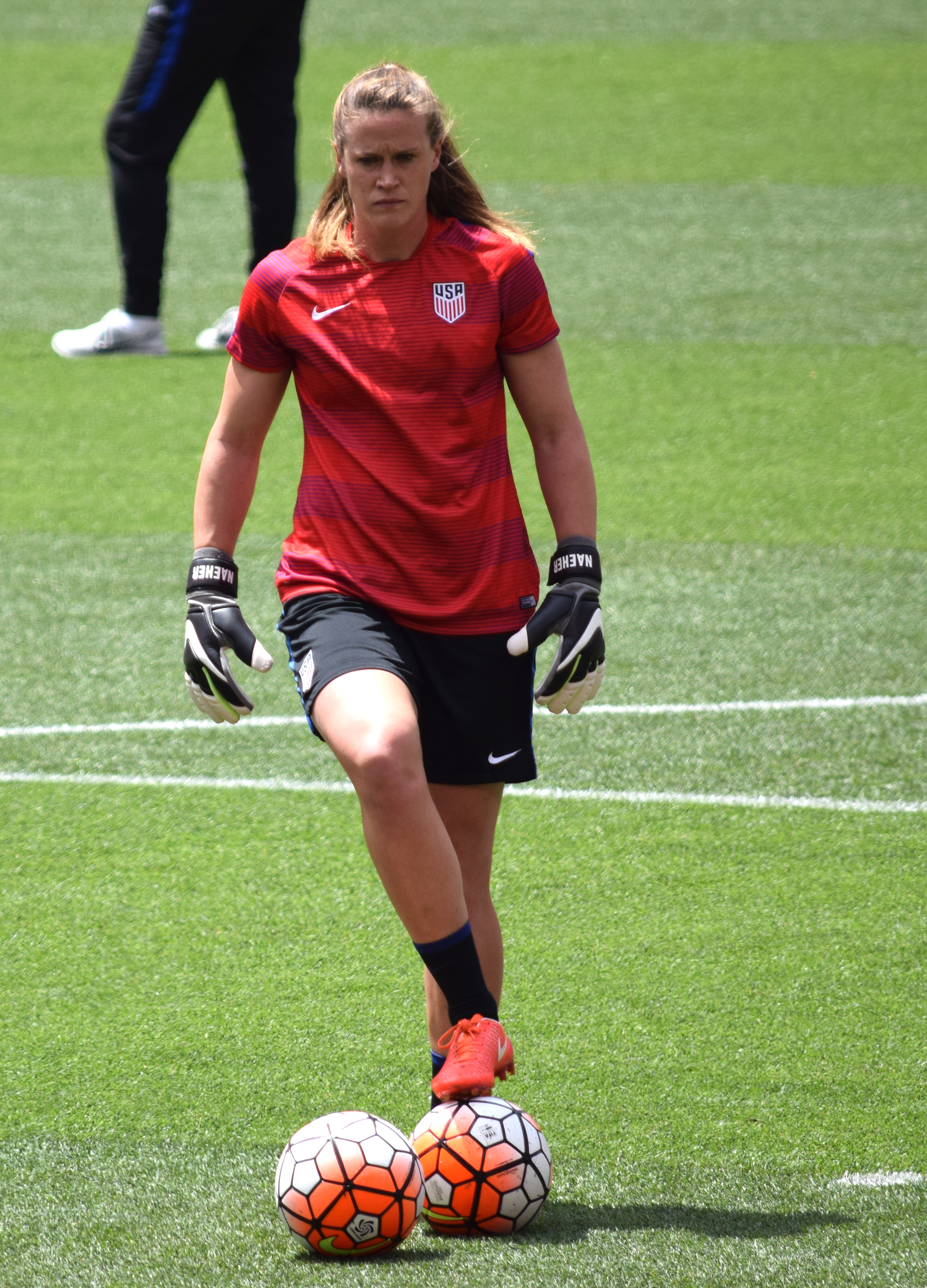
Alyssa Naeher ranks 2nd. in the all-time saves for Penn State

Saves
1	(United States) Emily Oleksiuk	1998–2001	416
2	(United States) Alyssa Naeher	2006–2009	359
3	(United States) Dara Christante	1995–1998	306
4	(United States) Katherine Asman	2019–2022	257
5	(United States) Britt Eckerstrom	2011–2015	255

Last updated: December 1, 2021
Source: Penn State Athletics

== Notable alumnae ==
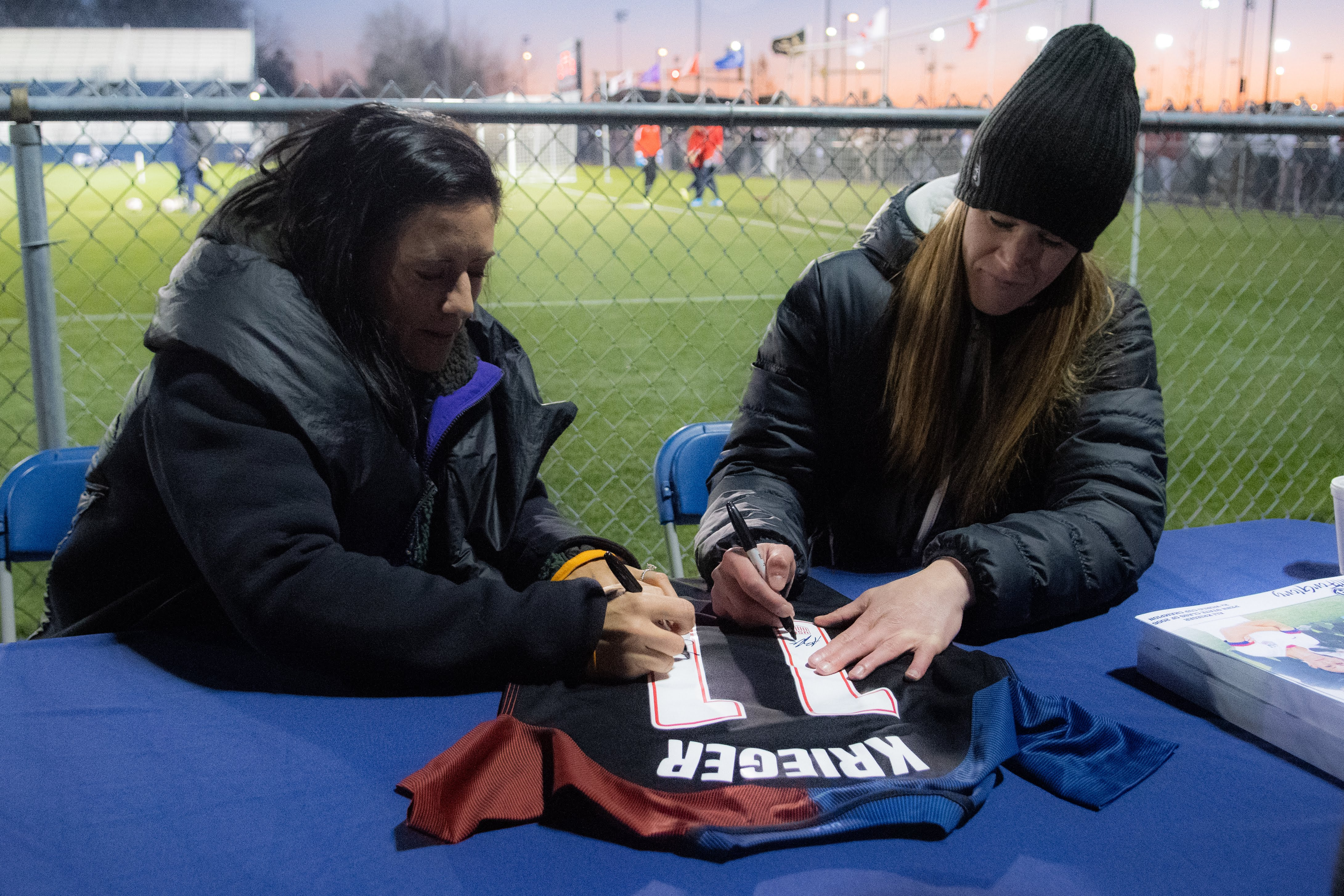
United States Women's National Team players Ali Krieger (left) and Alyssa Naeher (right) sign a jersey before the NCAA Tournament first round match against Stony Brook Women's Soccer on Friday, Nov. 15, 2019 at Jeffrey Field

Note: Flags indicate national team as defined under FIFA eligibility rules; some limited exceptions apply. Players may hold more than one non-FIFA nationality.

No.	Pos.	Nation	Player
—	DF	USA	Ali Krieger
—	MF	USA	Allie Long
—	GK	USA	Alyssa Naeher
—	FW	CRC	Raquel Rodríguez
—	GK	CAN	Erin McLeod
—	DF	CAN	Carmelina Moscato
—	DF	CAN	Lexi Marton
—	MF	CAN	Olivia Smith
—	FW	GER	Laura Freigang
—	MF	USA	Kate Wiesner

No.	Pos.	Nation	Player
—	FW	PUR	Nickolette Driesse
—	FW	EIR	Marissa Sheva
—	FW	USA	Christie Welsh
—	MF	USA	Christine Nairn
—	FW	USA	Maya Hayes
—	MF	USA	Joanna Lohman
—	GK	USA	Emily Oleksiuk
—	DF	USA	Mallory Weber
—	MF	USA	Sam Coffey
—	DF	USA	Kerry Abello
