= Hailey Baumann =

American soccer player (born 2005)

Personal information
- Date of birth: February 17, 2005 (age 21)
- Height: 5 ft 11 in (1.80 m)
- Position: Center back

Team information
- Current team: Wisconsin Badgers
- Number: 32

Youth career
- Michigan Hawks

College career
Years	Team	Apps	(Gls)
2023–	Wisconsin Badgers	83	(5)

Senior career*
Years	Team	Apps	(Gls)
2023–2024	Flint City AFC		

International career
2024	United States U-19		
2024–2025	United States U-20		
2026–	United States U-23		
- * Club domestic league appearances and goals

Hailey Baumann (born February 17, 2005) is an American college soccer player who plays as a center back for the Wisconsin Badgers.

== Early life ==
Baumann was raised in South Lyon, Michigan, the daughter of Jennifer and Russ Baumann, and has a brother. She committed to play college soccer for the Wisconsin Badgers during her junior year at St. Catherine of Siena Academy. She was also an all-state performer in basketball at St. Catherine, setting program records for career assists and steals. She played club soccer for the Michigan Hawks, being named an ECNL All-American selection after her last season.

== College career ==
Baumann was an immediate starter for the Wisconsin Badgers as a freshman in 2023, starting 22 games contributing to a strong defense that posted 0.65 goals against average. She helped the Badgers reach the Big Ten tournament final and the NCAA tournament second round and was named to the All-Big Ten third team and all-freshman team. She started all 24 games and scored 1 goal as a sophomore in 2024, leading the squad in minutes played. She helped the Badgers advance to the NCAA tournament third round and earned second-team All-Big Ten honors. In her junior year in 2025, she was named first-team All-Big Ten after starting all 22 games and scoring 1 goal.

== International career ==
Baumann made her international debut for the United States under-19 team in June 2024.

== Honors and awards ==
Individual

- First-team All-Big Ten: 2025, 2026
- Second-team All-Big Ten: 2024
- Third-team All-Big Ten: 2023
