= Dani Rhodes =

American soccer player

Personal information
- Full name: Dani Marie Rhodes
- Date of birth: April 8, 1998 (age 28)
- Height: 5 ft 5 in (1.65 m)
- Position: Forward

College career
Years	Team	Apps	(Gls)
2016–2019	Wisconsin Badgers	85	(38)

Senior career*
Years	Team	Apps	(Gls)
2020	Chicago Red Stars	0	(0)
2021	Þróttur Reykjavík	8	(3)
- * Club domestic league appearances and goals

Dani Marie Watt (née Rhodes; born April 8, 1998) is an American former professional soccer player who played as a forward. She played college soccer for the University of Wisconsin–Madison.

== Early life ==
Rhodes attended Waukesha West High School where she was a two time Wisconsin State girls Soccer Player of the Year.

== College career ==
Rhodes played college soccer at Wisconsin from 2016 to 2019. She scored her first collegiate goal on August 19, 2016, against Illinois State. Rhodes was named to the All-Big Ten Freshman Team in 2016. In 2017, she was named to the All-Big Ten second team. In 2019, she was named Big Ten Forward of the Year, and was named to the All-Big Ten first team.

== Club career ==
Rhodes made her NWSL debut for the Chicago Red Stars on September 12, 2020. She appeared in three out of Chicago's four matches during the 2020 Fall Series. before it was canceled due to the COVID-19 pandemic in the United States.

In July 2021, Rhodes signed with Þróttur Reykjavík of the Icelandic top-tier Úrvalsdeild kvenna. In her debut, she came on the 60th minute and scored Þróttur's third goal in its 4–0 victory against FH in the Icelandic Cup semi-finals.

She announced her retirement from soccer in February 2023.

== Personal life ==
Rhodes married NFL linebacker T. J. Watt on July 9, 2022.

On September 2, 2024, the couple announced that they were expecting their first child together. On March 10, 2025, they had a daughter, Blakely Marie Watt. On September 12, 2026, she announced they are expecting their second child.

== Career statistics ==
Appearances and goals by club, season and competition
Club	Season	League			Cup (Note: Includes the NWSL Challenge Cup and Icelandic Women's Football Cup)		Playoffs (Note: Includes NWSL Playoffs)		Other		Total	
Club	Season	Division	Apps	Goals	Apps	Goals	Apps	Goals	Apps	Goals	Apps	Goals
Chicago Red Stars	2020	NWSL	—		0	0	—		3 (Note: Includes the NWSL Fall Series)	0	3	0
Þróttur	2021	Úrvalsdeild kvenna	8	3	2	1	—		—		10	4
Career total			8	3	2	1	0	0	3	0	13	4

== Honors ==
Individual

- Big Ten Conference Forward of the Year: 2019
