= Emily Oleksiuk =

American soccer player (born 1980)

Personal information
- Full name: Emily Kristin Shaw
- Birth name: Emily Kristin Oleksiuk
- Date of birth: December 10, 1980 (age 45)
- Place of birth: Meadowbrook, Pennsylvania, U.S.
- Height: 5 ft 10 in (1.78 m)
- Position: Goalkeeper

Youth career
- Archbishop Wood Vikings

College career
Years	Team	Apps	(Gls)
1998–2001	Penn State Nittany Lions	100	(0)

Senior career*
Years	Team	Apps	(Gls)
2002	Carolina Courage	0	(0)

International career
1999–2002	United States U21		
2001	United States	2	(0)

Managerial career
- 2005–2010: Rhode Island Rams (assistant)
- * Club domestic league appearances and goals

Emily Kristin Shaw (née Oleksiuk; born December 10, 1980) is an American former soccer player who played as a goalkeeper, making two appearances for the United States women's national team.

== Career ==
Oleksiuk played for the Archbishop Wood Vikings in high school. In college, she played for the Penn State Nittany Lions from 1998 to 2001, where she was the team captain in her junior and senior years. She was an NSCAA First-Team All-American in 1999, 2000, and 2001, as well as an NSCAA First-Team Scholar All-American in 2001. She was a Soccer Buzz Freshman All-American and Big Ten Freshman of the Year in 1998, and received CoSIDA Academic All-America Honors as part of the second team in 2000 and first team in 2001. Oleksiuk was included in the All-Big Ten first team in all four seasons, and was named to the Big Ten All-Tournament Team in 1999 and 2000. In total, she made 100 appearances for Penn State, and holds the NCAA record for most career minutes played for a goalkeeper.

Oleksiuk played for the under-21 national team from 1999 to 2002. She made her international debut for the United States on March 13, 2001 in the 2001 Algarve Cup against Portugal. She earned her second and final cap for the U.S. four days later in the Algarve Cup against Norway.

Oleksiuk was selected by the Carolina Courage in the 2002 WUSA draft. However, she did not make an appearance during the 2002 season. In 2002, she was selected to play in the Umbro Select College All-Star Classic.

From 2005 to 2010, Oleksiuk worked as an assistant coach for the Rhode Island Rams. She was inducted into the Southeastern Pennsylvania Soccer Hall of Fame in 2015.

== Personal life ==
Oleksiuk was born in Meadowbrook, Pennsylvania, and grew up in Willow Grove. She is married to Zac Shaw, former soccer player and current coach, and has four children.

== Career statistics ==
=== International ===
United States
Year	Apps	Goals
2001	2	0
Total	2	0
