= Patrick Farmer (soccer) =

American soccer coach (born 1949)

Personal information
- Date of birth: May 9, 1949 (age 77)
- Place of birth: Old Forge, New York, U.S.

Youth career
- Town of Webb Eskimos

College career
Years	Team	Apps	(Gls)
- St. Lawrence Saints

Managerial career
- St. Lawrence Saints (men; asst.)
- 1976–1979: Town of Webb Eskimos (boys JV)
- 1980–1986: Town of Webb Eskimos (girls)
- 1987–1993: Ithaca Bombers (women)
- 1994–2000: Penn State Nittany Lions (women)
- 2001–2002: New York Power
- 2003: Tennessee Tech Golden Eagles (women)
- 2004–2007: Syracuse Orange (women)
- 2008–2011: Wisconsin Badgers (women; asst.)
- 2012–2016: Cornell Big Red (women)
- 2018: Transylvania Pioneers (women; asst.)
- 2018–2021: Transylvania Pioneers (women)

Patrick Farmer (born May 9, 1949) is an American soccer coach. Farmer previously coached university women's soccer teams at Ithaca, Penn State, Tennessee Tech, Syracuse, Cornell, and Transylvania. He also coached New York Power, the first professional soccer league for women in the United States, in the Women's United Soccer Association.

== Early life and education ==
A native of Old Forge, New York, Farmer was a letterman on the soccer, skiing, and track teams at Town of Webb High School. He earned bachelor's and master's degrees from St. Lawrence University, where he was a three-time letterwinner in soccer and skiing. He also served as an assistant coach and then the head coach for the men's ski team, and assistant coach for the men's soccer team.

== Coaching career ==
Farmer holds an NSCAA Premier diploma, a Prelim badge from the England Football Association as well as a United States Soccer Federation 'A' License.

=== Town of Webb High School ===
Farmer served as the boys junior varsity soccer coach at his alma mater, Town of Webb High School, from 1976 to 1979, compiling a record of 44 wins, 12 losses, and 6 ties. From 1980 to 1986 he led the girls' varsity soccer team, winning six league and two regional titles, finishing with a record of 95 wins, 26 losses, and 1 tie.

=== Ithaca College ===
Farmer was head coach for the women's soccer team at Ithaca College from 1987–1993. The Bombers made their first NCAA appearance in Farmer's first season as head coach. They later advanced to the national semifinals in 1988. His record during his seven-year tenure at Ithaca was 110-23-23. In 1998, he was inducted into the Ithaca College Sports Hall of Fame.

=== Penn State University ===
In 1994, Farmer was hired as the first head coach of the new women's soccer program at Penn State University. His record at Penn State was 123-34-8 (.770). Farmer was named the NSCAA/adidas Division I National Coach of the Year after the 1999 season, also earning the Mid-Atlantic Region coach of the year title for a third time. He led the team to three straight Big Ten championships from 1998–2000.

=== New York Power ===
In 2001, Farmer left the collegiate level for the newly former women's professional soccer league, the Women's United Soccer Association. As head coach, he helped lead the New York Power to a third-place finish and the playoff semifinals that same year.

=== Tennessee Tech ===
In 2003, Farmer was named head coach of the women's soccer team at Tennessee Tech.

=== Syracuse University ===
He returned to his home state of New York the following year to coach for Syracuse University.

=== University of Wisconsin ===
He later joined his former Penn State coaching colleagues at the University of Wisconsin as an assistant coach.

=== Cornell University ===
In 2012, he was named head coach of the Cornell University women's soccer program.

== Honors and awards ==
In 2007, Farmer was named the 13th-winningest coach (by victories) among active NCAA Division 1 women's soccer coaches. He has been named the National Soccer Coaches Association of America Coach of the Year at both the Division I and Division III levels.

=== College teams ===
Penn State Nittany Lions

- Big Ten: 1997, 1998, 1999

=== Personal ===
- 1999 NSCAA/Adidas Division I National Coach of the Year
- 1999 Mid-Atlantic Region NSCAA / Adidas Division I Coach of the Year
- 1998 Soccer Times Division I National Coach of the Year
- 1999 Soccer Buzz Mid-Atlantic Region Coach of the Year
- 1998 Mid-Atlantic Region NSCAA/Umbro Division I Coach of the Year
- 1998 Big Ten Conference Coach of the Year
- 1998 Soccer Buzz Mid-Atlantic Region Coach of the Year
- 1998 Ithaca Hall of Fame Inductee
- 1996 Mid-Atlantic Region NSCAA/Umbro Division I Coach of the Year
- 1992 New York State Collegiate Athletic Conference Coach of the Year

== Personal life ==
Farmer has two children: a daughter, Courtney, and a son, Cord.
