= Emily Curran =

American professional soccer player

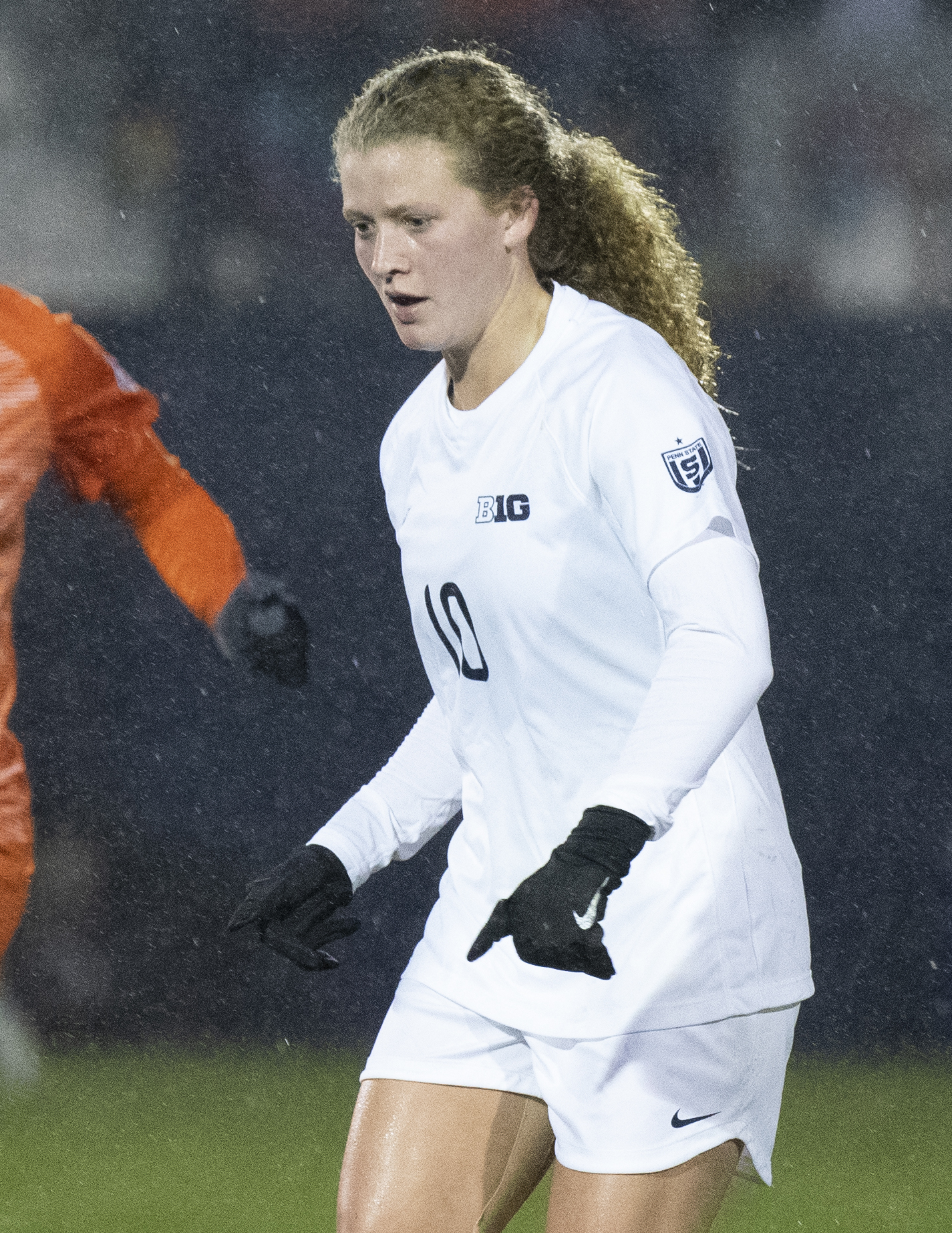
- Curran with Penn State in 2018

Personal information
- Full name: Emily Helena Curran
- Birth name: Emily Helena Ogle
- Date of birth: August 5, 1996 (age 30)
- Place of birth: Strongsville, Ohio, United States
- Height: 5 ft 5 in (1.65 m)
- Position: Midfielder

College career
Years	Team	Apps	(Gls)
2014–2018	Penn State Nittany Lions	100	(20)

Senior career*
Years	Team	Apps	(Gls)
2019–2020	Portland Thorns	3	(0)
2021–2023	Houston Dash	25	(0)

International career
2016	United States U20		
- * Club domestic league appearances and goals as of 15:44, October 16, 2023 (UTC)

Emily Helena Curran (née Ogle; born August 5, 1996) is an American former professional soccer player who played as a midfielder. She played college soccer for the Penn State Nittany Lions before playing professionally for the Houston Dash and Portland Thorns FC of the National Women's Soccer League (NWSL). A former United States youth international, Curran was nominated for the 2016 U.S. Soccer Young Female Player of the Year award.

== College career ==
As a freshman at Penn State, Curran started all 24 games of the 2014 season for the Nittany Lions. During a match against West Virginia, she scored a goal and provided an assist to lift the team to a 3–1 win. She finished the season having played 1,922 minutes, scored three goals and served four assists. Curran scored the game-winning goal against Wisconsin the same year.

During her sophomore year, she helped Penn State advance and win the NCAA College Cup. She scored a goal and provided an assist during the team's 4–0 victory over Ohio State in the third round of the tournament. She scored her second game-winning goal of the season in the 12th minute of a 2–0 win over West Virginia in the quarterfinals. As a midfielder, Curran played all 90 minutes in Penn State's 1–0 victory over Duke University in the College Cup Final. She ranked fourth on the team in minutes played (2,098) and finished the year with seven goals and five assists (19 points).

== Club career ==
She re-signed with Houston Dash in January 2023, and became a free agent in November 2023.

== Personal life ==
She married Mac Curran in November 2022, and began using her married name.

== Honors ==
Penn State

- NCAA College Cup: 2015

Individual

- Big Ten Conference Freshman of the Year: 2014
- Big Ten Conference All-Freshman team: 2014
- All-Big Ten Second Team: 2015
- NSCAA All-Great Lakes region first team: 2015
- Women's College Cup All-Tournament Team: 2015
- U.S. Soccer Young Female Player of the Year nominee: 2016
