= Wisconsin Badgers women's soccer =

American college soccer team

- Founded: 1981; 45 years ago
- University: University of Wisconsin–Madison
- Head coach: Paula Wilkins (20th season)
- Conference: Big Ten
- Location: Madison, Wisconsin, US
- Stadium: McClimon Complex (capacity: 2,000)
- Nickname: Badgers
- Colors: Cardinal and white
| Home | Away |

NCAA tournament runner-up
- 1991

NCAA tournament College Cup
- 1988, 1991

NCAA tournament appearances
- 1985, 1988, 1989, 1990, 1991, 1993, 1994, 1995, 1996, 1998, 2000, 2002, 2004, 2005, 2009, 2010, 2012, 2014, 2016, 2017, 2018, 2019, 2021, 2023, 2024, 2025, 2026

The Wisconsin Badgers women's soccer is the team that represents the University of Wisconsin–Madison in NCAA Division I college soccer.

== History ==
Wisconsin women's soccer began in 1981.

The Badgers have been to the NCAA tournament in 1985, 1988, 1989, 1990, 1991, 1993, 1994, 1995, 1996, 1998, 2000, 2002, 2004, 2005, 2009, 2010, 2012, 2014, 2016, 2017, 2018, 2019, 2021, 2023, 2024, 2025, and 2026.

== Current squad ==
As of November 2026

Note: Flags indicate national team as defined under FIFA eligibility rules; some limited exceptions apply. Players may hold more than one non-FIFA nationality.

| No. | Pos. | Nation | Player |
|---|---|---|---|
| 0 | GK | USA | Mira Issar |
| 0 | GK | USA | Reese Elzen |
| 1 | GK | USA | Drew Stover |
| 2 | DF | CAN | Jadea Collin |
| 3 | FW | USA | Abby Ballek |
| 4 | FW | USA | Taylor Gordon |
| 5 | MF | USA | KK Panella |
| 6 | FW | USA | Jane Rogers |
| 7 | MF | USA | Margaret Sisk |
| 8 | MF | USA | Delaney Cox |
| 9 | FW | USA | Sonoma Bever |
| 10 | FW | USA | Brooke Allen |
| 11 | DF | USA | Kiara Gilmore |
| 13 | DF | USA | Sascha Beasley |

| No. | Pos. | Nation | Player |
|---|---|---|---|
| 14 | DF | USA | Megan Cornell |
| 15 | FW | USA | Taylor Schad |
| 16 | MF | USA | Abbey Stanton |
| 17 | MF | USA | Grace Dykstra |
| 18 | MF | USA | Tyler Rolf |
| 20 | DF | USA | Calypso Rolly |
| 21 | MF | USA | Anya Gulbrandsen |
| 22 | MF | USA | Jenna Baumann |
| 23 | MF | USA | Izy Traub |
| 24 | GK | USA | Brooke Nelson |
| 25 | MF | USA | Erin Connolly |
| 26 | FW | USA | Tuscany Khachab |
| 32 | DF | USA | Hailey Baumann |
