= List of United States women's international soccer players =

List of players of the U.S. women's national soccer team

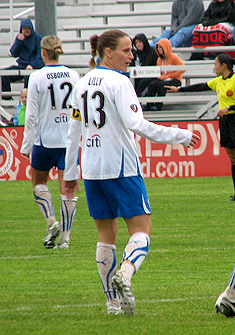
Kristine Lilly is the all-time highest internationally capped player in soccer with 354 appearances from 1987 to 2010.

The United States women's national soccer team (USWNT) represents the United States in international women's soccer. The team is fielded by the United States Soccer Federation (USSF), the governing body of soccer in the United States, and competes as a member of the Confederation of North, Central American and Caribbean Association Football (CONCACAF). The United States competed in their first international match on August 18, 1985, a 1–0 loss in the Mundialito against Italy. In total, 263 players have appeared for the national team since its inception.

The United States have competed in numerous friendly and competitive competitions, and all players who have played in a match, either as a member of the starting eleven or as a substitute, are listed below. Each player's details include her playing position while with the team, the number of caps earned and goals scored in all international matches, and details of the first and most recent matches played in. The players in the list are ordered alphabetically using their most common name. All statistics are correct up to and including the match played on July 2, 2025, against Canada.

== Key ==
Positions key
GK	Goalkeeper
DF	Defender
MF	Midfielder
FW	Forward

Player
This color background and the * symbol indicate that the player was active at club and/or international level at the date specified above.
The name that each player is most commonly known by is listed, which may differ from her legal name or surname used during or after her playing career. Players are noted if they have used a different maiden or married name during their life. Players which have been capped for other senior or youth national teams during their career are also noted.
Position
Playing positions are listed according to the media guide published by the United States Soccer Federation. (Note: If unavailable, the position listed in other publications is used.)
Caps and goals
Caps and goals comprise those in official competitions, along with international friendly tournaments and matches.

== Players ==
United States women's national soccer team players
Player	Pos.	Caps	Goals	Debut		Last or most recent match	
Player	Pos.	Caps	Goals	Date	Opponent	Date	Opponent
Kerry Abello *	DF	1	0	June 3, 2025	Jamaica	June 3, 2025	Jamaica
Danesha Adams	MF	1	0	October 1, 2006	Chinese Taipei	October 1, 2006	Chinese Taipei
Michelle Akers (Note: Married name was previously Akers-Stahl from 1990 to 1994)	FW	155	107	August 21, 1985	Denmark	August 20, 2000	Canada
Korbin Albert *	MF	26	1	December 5, 2023	China	April 8, 2025	Brazil
Heather Aldama	MF	5	0	December 16, 1998	Ukraine	January 13, 2000	Australia
Yael Averbuch West	MF	26	1	January 28, 2007	England	November 10, 2013	Brazil
Bethany Balcer *	FW	1	0	November 27, 2021	Australia	November 27, 2021	Australia
Nicole Barnhart	GK (Note: Barnhart made her international debut in 2004 as a forward to replace an injured player, as the team had no more outfield substitutes available.)	54	0	October 16, 2004	Mexico	October 27, 2013	New Zealand
Tamie Batista (Note: Married name is Shadle, was previously Grimes)	DF	1	0	April 10, 1993	Germany	April 10, 1993	Germany
Pam Baughman-Cornell	FW	4 (Note: Caps/goals included from the 1986 North America Cup play-off on July 9, 1986 against Canada (3–0 win). Scorers: April Heinrichs (2), Pam Baughman-Cornell (1).)	1	August 24, 1985	Denmark	July 9, 1986 (match 2)	Canada
Justi Baumgardt (Note: Married name is Yamada)	MF	16	3	June 12, 1993	Canada	December 20, 1998	Ukraine
Meredith Beard (Note: Née Florance)	FW	3	0	February 24, 1999	Finland	January 14, 2001	China
LaKeysia Beene	GK	18	0	January 7, 2000	Czech Republic	June 14, 2003	Republic of Ireland
Keisha Bell (Note: Married name is Sowell)	DF	2	0	March 11, 2001	Canada	March 17, 2001	Norway
Denise Bender	DF	4	0	August 18, 1985	Italy	August 24, 1985	Denmark
Jenny Benson (Note: Married name is Spiehs)	MF	8	0	January 11, 2001	China	February 16, 2003	Iceland
Angela Berry-White	DF	2	0	August 14, 1992	Norway	June 21, 1993	Canada
Croix Bethune *	MF	7	1	July 13, 2024	Mexico	January 27, 2026	Chile
Jackie Billet	MF	1	0	August 16, 1992	Norway	August 16, 1992	Norway
Kylie Bivens	MF	17	0	January 23, 2002	Norway	March 18, 2004	Sweden
Lynn Biyendolo (Note: Née Williams) *	FW	83	24	October 19, 2016	Switzerland	July 2, 2025	Canada
Samantha Bohon (Note: Née Baggett)	DF	2	1	December 16, 1998	Ukraine	February 24, 1999	Finland
Danielle Borgman	MF	2	0	October 30, 1997	Sweden	December 10, 2000	Mexico
Shannon Boxx (Note: Married name is Spearman)	MF	195	27	September 1, 2003	Costa Rica	October 21, 2015	Brazil
Denise Boyer-Merdich	MF	7	1	August 18, 1985	Italy	July 11, 1987	Norway
Jenni Branam	GK	6	0	March 14, 2000	Denmark	March 11, 2006	Denmark
Amber Brooks	MF	1	0	November 10, 2013	Brazil	November 10, 2013	Brazil
Leigh Ann Brown (Note: Née Robinson)	DF	2	0	September 3, 2013	Mexico	November 10, 2013	Brazil
Tara Buckley O'Sullivan	DF	1	0	August 24, 1985	Denmark	August 24, 1985	Denmark
Sheri Bueter Hauser	FW	1	0	December 16, 1998	Ukraine	December 16, 1998	Ukraine
Jordyn Bugg *	DF	6	0	June 26, 2025	Republic of Ireland	January 27, 2026	Chile
Susan Bush (Note: Married name is Quill)	FW	10	3	December 16, 1998	Ukraine	July 7, 2000	Italy
Kelly Cagle (Note: Née Walbert)	FW	1	0	April 10, 1994	Trinidad and Tobago	April 10, 1994	Trinidad and Tobago
Jane Campbell *	GK	10	0	April 9, 2017	Russia	February 26, 2025	Japan
Lori Chalupny	DF	106	10	March 7, 2001	Italy	October 25, 2015	Brazil
Brandi Chastain	DF	192	30	June 1, 1988	Japan	December 8, 2004	Mexico
Mandy Clemens (Note: Married name is Cavan)	FW	5	0	February 24, 1999	Finland	April 27, 2002	Finland
Suzy Cobb Germain	DF	1	0	July 9, 1986 (match 2)	Canada	July 9, 1986 (match 2)	Canada
Sam Coffey *	MF	46	5	September 6, 2022	Nigeria	April 17, 2026	Japan
Danielle Colaprico *	MF	2	0	November 8, 2018	Portugal	November 13, 2018	Scotland
Lisa Cole Zimmerman	FW	2	0	July 27, 1990	Canada	August 9, 1990	England
Robin Confer	FW	8	1	January 18, 1996	Ukraine	December 16, 1998	Ukraine
Kerry Connors	MF	4	0	March 3, 1997	Australia	October 9, 1997	Germany
Kim Conway Haley	DF	4	0	July 7, 1993	Australia	July 14, 1993	Russia
Alana Cook *	DF	30	1	November 10, 2019	Costa Rica	June 26, 2025	Republic of Ireland
Ann Cook	MF	1	0	December 16, 1998	Ukraine	December 16, 1998	Ukraine
Michelle Cooper *	FW	14	1	February 20, 2025	Colombia	June 9, 2026	Brazil
Stephanie Cox (Note: Née Lopez)	DF	89	0	March 13, 2005	Denmark	September 13, 2014	Mexico
Aleisha Cramer (Note: Married name is Rose)	MF	19	0	December 16, 1998	Ukraine	January 25, 2002	Germany
Amanda Cromwell	DF	55	1	April 2, 1991	Bulgaria	December 16, 1998	Ukraine
Colette Cunningham (Note: Married name was previously Landon)	FW	2	0	August 14, 1992	Norway	August 16, 1992	Norway
Maddie Dahlien *	F	3	0	January 24, 2026	Paraguay	March 1, 2026	Argentina
Abby Dahlkemper *	MF	84	0	October 19, 2016	Switzerland	April 9, 2024	Canada
Jaelene Daniels (Note: Née Hinkle)	DF	8	0	October 21, 2015	Brazil	February 15, 2016	Puerto Rico
Tierna Davidson *	DF	70	3	January 21, 2018	Denmark	June 6, 2026	Brazil
Savannah DeMelo *	FW	7	0	July 9, 2023	Wales	December 2, 2023	China
Michelle Demko	MF	1	0	October 9, 1997	Germany	October 9, 1997	Germany
Kristi DeVert (Note: Married name is Juarez)	MF	4	1	October 9, 1997	Germany	December 13, 1997	Brazil
Claudia Dickey *	GK	11	0	June 26, 2025	Republic of Ireland	June 9, 2026	Brazil
Tina DiMartino	MF	5	1	January 18, 2008	Finland	March 11, 2009	Sweden
Imani Dorsey	DF	1	0	November 30, 2021	Australia	November 30, 2021	Australia
Marian Dougherty (Note: Née Dalmy)	DF	11	0	April 14, 2007	Mexico	May 25, 2009	Canada
Betsy Drambour	DF	7	0	July 7, 1986	Canada	July 7, 1987	Canada
Tracy Ducar (Note: Née Noonan)	GK	24	0	January 16, 1996	Brazil	October 3, 1999	South Korea
Joan Dunlap-Seivold	FW	4	1	July 7, 1986	Canada	July 26, 1986	Italy
Crystal Dunn (Note: Married name is Soubrier)	FW	160	25	February 13, 2013	Scotland	May 31, 2025	China
Tina Frimpong Ellertson (Note: Née Frimpong)	DF	34	1	July 10, 2005	Ukraine	December 17, 2008	China
Whitney Engen	DF	40	4	March 4, 2011	Norway	September 18, 2016	Netherlands
Stacey Enos	DF	10	0	August 18, 1985	Italy	July 26, 1986	Italy
Julie Ertz (Note: Née Johnston)	DF	123	20	February 9, 2013	Scotland	September 21, 2023	South Africa
Lorrie Fair	DF	120	7	February 4, 1996	Norway	July 24, 2005	Iceland
Ronnie Fair (Note: Married name is Sullins)	DF	3	0	May 9, 1997	England	December 16, 1998	Ukraine
Joy Fawcett (Note: Née Biefeld)	DF	241	27	August 3, 1987	China	August 26, 2004	Brazil
Karen Ferguson-Dayes	FW	2	0	August 14, 1992	Norway	March 14, 1993	Germany
Jessica Fischer	DF	2	0	June 12, 1993	Canada	June 21, 1993	Canada
Mia Fishel *	FW	3	1	September 24, 2023	South Africa	December 2, 2023	China
Lorraine Fitzhugh (Note: Née Figgins)	DF	1	0	July 9, 1986 (match 2)	Canada	July 9, 1986 (match 2)	Canada
Kendall Fletcher	DF	1	0	March 9, 2009	Norway	March 9, 2009	Norway
Taylor Flint (Note: Née Kornieck) *	MF	12	2	June 25, 2022	Colombia	February 22, 2023	Brazil
Danielle Fotopoulos (Note: Née Garrett)	FW	35	16	January 14, 1996	Russia	October 23, 2005	Mexico
Julie Foudy	MF	274	45	July 29, 1988	France	December 8, 2004	Mexico
Emily Fox *	DF	78	1	November 8, 2018	Portugal	June 9, 2026	Brazil
Adrianna Franch *	GK	10	0	March 2, 2019	England	October 21, 2021	South Korea
Michelle French	MF	14	0	May 11, 1997	England	July 3, 2001	Canada
Eva Gaetino *	DF	2	0	October 30, 2024	Argentina	October 29, 2025	New Zealand
Linda Gancitano	DF	2	0	August 18, 1985	Italy	August 24, 1985	Denmark
Morgan Gautrat (Note: Née Brian) *	MF	88	8	June 15, 2013	South Korea	February 17, 2022	Czech Republic
Wendy Gebauer (Note: Married name is Palladino)	FW	26	10	December 12, 1987	Japan	November 21, 1991	Japan
Naomi Girma *	DF	54	3	April 12, 2022	Uzbekistan	April 17, 2026	Japan
Lisa Gmitter-Pittaro	FW	12	3	July 7, 1986	Canada	December 20, 1987	Chinese Taipei
Cindy Gordon	FW	6	0	August 18, 1985	Italy	July 9, 1986 (match 1)	Canada
Sandi Gordon (Note: Married name is Yotz)	DF	7	0	July 9, 1987	Sweden	July 29, 1988	France
Lauren Gregg	DF	1	0	July 9, 1986 (match 2)	Canada	July 9, 1986 (match 2)	Canada
Amy Griffin (Note: Née Allmann)	GK	24	0	July 5, 1987	Norway	October 4, 1991	China
Jennifer Grubb	DF	12	2	July 30, 1995	Chinese Taipei	February 24, 1999	Finland
Sarah Hagen	FW	2	0	March 7, 2014	Sweden	March 10, 2014	Denmark
Kristen Hamilton	FW	1	0	September 3, 2019	Portugal	September 3, 2019	Portugal
Linda Hamilton	DF	72	1	August 3, 1987	China	August 6, 1995	Norway
Mia Hamm (Note: Married name is Garciaparra)	FW (Note: Hamm filled in as a goalkeeper after Briana Scurry was sent off in the 88th minute against Denmark at the 1995 FIFA Women's World Cup.)	276	158	August 3, 1987	China	December 8, 2004	Mexico
Lauren Hanson (Note: Née Orlandos)	DF	1	0	January 14, 2001	China	January 14, 2001	China
Ruth Harker	GK	3	0	August 21, 1985	Denmark	August 24, 1985	Denmark
Ashlyn Harris	GK	25	0	March 11, 2013	Sweden	January 31, 2020	Panama
Mary Harvey (Note: Married name is Capobianco)	GK	27	0	June 21, 1989	Poland	July 4, 1996	Australia
Ashley Hatch (Note: Married name is Van Buren) *	FW	23	5	October 19, 2016	Switzerland	April 5, 2025	Brazil
Devvyn Hawkins (Note: Married name is MacBeth)	MF	9	1	March 7, 2001	Italy	January 29, 2003	Germany
Tucka Healy	FW	3	0	August 18, 1985	Italy	August 24, 1985	Denmark
Lindsey Heaps (Note: Née Horan) *	MF	178	40	March 8, 2013	China	June 9, 2026	Brazil
Tobin Heath	MF	181	36	January 18, 2008	Finland	October 26, 2021	South Korea
April Heinrichs	FW	47	37	July 7, 1986	Canada	November 30, 1991	Norway
Holly Hellmuth (Note: Married name is Wiles)	DF	1	0	July 27, 1990	Canada	July 27, 1990	Canada
Lori Henry	DF	40	3	August 18, 1985	Italy	November 24, 1991	Chinese Taipei
Hal Hershfelt *	DF	5	0	October 24, 2024	Iceland	January 27, 2026	Chile
Shannon Higgins-Cirovski	MF	51	4	July 5, 1987	Norway	November 30, 1991	Norway
Lauren Holiday (Note: Née Cheney)	MF	133	24	January 26, 2007	Germany	October 25, 2015	Brazil
Jaelin Howell *	MF	6	1	November 27, 2020	Netherlands	December 1, 2025	Italy
Angela Hucles (Note: Married name is Mangano)	MF	109	13	April 27, 2002	Finland	July 22, 2009	Canada
Sofia Huerta (Note: Huerta was also capped to the Mexico under-20 and senior national teams.) *	DF	32	0	September 15, 2017	New Zealand	October 29, 2023	Colombia
Sarah Huffman	MF	1	0	July 13, 2010	Sweden	July 13, 2010	Sweden
Lindsey Huie (Note: Married name is Morinaga)	DF	1	0	March 11, 2005	Finland	March 11, 2005	Finland
Claire Hutton *	MF	20	1	February 23, 2025	Australia	June 9, 2026	Brazil
Patty Irizarry	DF	2	0	July 7, 1987	Canada	July 29, 1988	France
Riley Jackson *	MF	1	0	January 27, 2026	Chile	January 27, 2026	Chile
Carin Jennings-Gabarra	FW	119	56	July 5, 1987	Norway	August 1, 1996	China
Marci Jobson (Note: Née Miller)	MF	17	0	June 26, 2005	Canada	August 25, 2007	Finland
Laura Jones	DF	1	0	August 16, 1992	Norway	August 16, 1992	Norway
Jameese Joseph *	MF	1	0	November 28, 2025	Italy	November 28, 2025	Italy
Natasha Kai	FW	67	24	March 11, 2006	Denmark	March 11, 2009	Sweden
Christina Kaufman (Note: Née Van Leeuwen)	FW	2	1	August 4, 1993	New Zealand	August 6, 1993	Trinidad and Tobago
Beth Keller	MF	1	1	February 24, 1999	Finland	February 24, 1999	Finland
Debbie Keller	FW	46	18	May 14, 1995	Brazil	December 20, 1998	Ukraine
Angie Kerr (Note: Née Woznuk)	MF	10	2	July 24, 2005	Iceland	March 11, 2009	Sweden
Sherrill Kester (Note: Married name is Dempsey)	FW	3	3	January 7, 2000	Czech Republic	January 13, 2000	Australia
Aubrey Kingsbury (Note: Née Bledsoe) *	GK	2	0	April 12, 2022	Uzbekistan	December 5, 2023	China
Meghan Klingenberg	DF	74	3	January 23, 2011	Canada	June 11, 2017	Norway
Jena Kluegel (Note: Married name is Cogswell)	MF	24	1	February 9, 2000	Norway	February 16, 2003	Iceland
Brittany Kolmel (Note: Née Taylor)	DF	2	0	March 31, 2010	Mexico	January 23, 2011	Canada
Anna Kraus	DF	6	0	July 7, 2000	Italy	March 17, 2001	Norway
Ali Krieger	DF	108	1	January 16, 2008	Canada	January 22, 2021	Colombia
Casey Krueger (Note: Née Short) *	DF	60	0	October 19, 2016	Switzerland	November 30, 2024	England
Lo'eau LaBonta *	FW	4	0	May 31, 2025	China	October 29, 2025	New Zealand
Jennifer Lalor (Note: Married name is Nielsen)	MF	23	2	August 16, 1992	Norway	January 14, 2001	China
Rose Lavelle *	MF	122	29	March 4, 2017	England	June 9, 2026	Brazil
Tracey Leone (Note: Née Bates)	MF	29	5	July 5, 1987	Norway	November 21, 1991	Japan
Amy LePeilbet	DF	84	0	January 30, 2004	Sweden	December 15, 2012	China
Sydney Leroux (Note: Married name is Dwyer) (Note: Leroux was also capped to the Canada under-19 national team.) *	FW	77	35	January 21, 2011	Sweden	August 3, 2017	Japan
Gina Lewandowski	DF	1	0	October 25, 2015	Brazil	October 25, 2015	Brazil
Kristine Lilly (Note: Married name is Heavey)	MF	354	130	August 3, 1987	China	November 5, 2010	Mexico
Kelly Lindsey	DF	4	0	January 7, 2000	Czech Republic	September 8, 2002	Scotland
Lori Lindsey	MF	31	1	July 24, 2005	Iceland	February 13, 2013	Scotland
Carli Lloyd (Note: Married name is Hollins)	MF	316	134	July 10, 2005	Ukraine	October 26, 2021	South Korea
Joanna Lohman	MF	9	0	March 7, 2001	Italy	January 30, 2007	China
Allie Long (Note: Married name is Batista)	MF	51	8	May 8, 2014	Canada	November 10, 2019	Costa Rica
Casey Loyd (Note: Née Nogueira)	FW	5	0	January 28, 2007	England	March 31, 2010	Mexico
Jillian Loyden	GK	10	0	October 2, 2010	China	April 6, 2014	China
Kristin Luckenbill	GK	14	0	April 24, 2004	Brazil	December 8, 2004	Mexico
Catarina Macario *	MF	29	16	January 18, 2021	Colombia	December 1, 2025	Italy
Hailie Mace *	DF	9	0	April 8, 2018	Mexico	October 30, 2024	Argentina
Shannon MacMillan	FW	177	60	July 7, 1993	Australia	October 23, 2005	Mexico
Alyssa Malonson *	DF	1	0	October 30, 2024	Argentina	October 30, 2024	Argentina
Holly Manthei	MF / FW	23	0	January 23, 1995	Australia	May 4, 1997	South Korea
Kate Markgraf (Note: Née Sobrero)	DF	201	1	April 26, 1998	Argentina	July 17, 2010	Sweden
Ally Marquand (Note: Married name is Estess)	MF / FW	4	1	March 7, 2001	Italy	March 17, 2001	Norway
Ella Masar (Note: Married name was previously McLeod from 2015 to 2019)	FW	1	0	October 29, 2009	Germany	October 29, 2009	Germany
Jen Mascaro (Note: Née Streiffer)	MF	4	2	February 24, 1999	Finland	January 13, 2000	Australia
Kim Maslin-Kammerdeiner	GK	17	0	July 27, 1988	England	September 1, 1991	Norway
Merritt Mathias	DF	1	0	June 12, 2018	China	June 12, 2018	China
Stephanie McCaffrey	FW	6	1	October 25, 2015	Brazil	February 15, 2016	Puerto Rico
Megan McCarthy	DF	42	0	July 5, 1987	Norway	April 14, 1994	Canada
Savannah McCaskill *	FW	6	0	January 21, 2018	Denmark	June 7, 2018	China
Haley McCutcheon (Note: Née Hanson) *	MF	1	0	April 8, 2018	Mexico	April 8, 2018	Mexico
Marcia McDermott	MF	7	4	July 7, 1986	Canada	June 8, 1988	Norway
Jessica McDonald	FW	19	4	November 10, 2016	Romania	March 8, 2020	Spain
Mandy McGlynn (Note: Née Haught) *	GK	6	0	October 30, 2024	Argentina	June 6, 2026	Brazil
Tegan McGrady	DF	1	0	April 8, 2018	Mexico	April 8, 2018	Mexico
Sharon McMurtry (Note: Married name is Remer)	MF	6	0	August 18, 1985	Italy	July 9, 1986 (match 1)	Canada
Jen Mead	GK	6	0	June 21, 1993	Canada	December 13, 1997	Brazil
Sally Menti *	MF	1	0	January 24, 2026	Paraguay	January 24, 2026	Paraguay
Kristie Mewis	MF	53	7	February 9, 2013	Scotland	August 6, 2023	Sweden
Sam Mewis	MF	83	24	March 7, 2014	Sweden	August 5, 2021	Australia
Sam Meza *	MF	3	0	June 29, 2025	Republic of Ireland	January 27, 2026	Chile
Tiffeny Milbrett	FW	206	100	August 4, 1991	China	October 23, 2005	Mexico
Heather Mitts (Note: Married name is Feeley)	DF	137	2	February 24, 1999	Finland	December 15, 2012	China
Mary-Frances Monroe	MF	9	0	January 13, 2000	Australia	March 17, 2001	Norway
Megan Montefusco (Note: Née Oyster)	DF	2	0	April 6, 2017	Russia	April 9, 2017	Russia
Alex Morgan (Note: Married name is Carrasco)	FW	224	123	March 31, 2010	Mexico	June 5, 2024	South Korea
Cindy Mosley (Note: Née Daws)	MF	2	0	May 2, 1997	South Korea	May 4, 1997	South Korea
Olivia Moultrie *	MF	18	5	December 2, 2023	China	June 6, 2026	Brazil
Siri Mullinix	GK	45	0	May 2, 1999	Japan	March 16, 2004	Denmark
Casey Murphy *	GK	20	0	November 27, 2021	Australia	June 29, 2025	Republic of Ireland
Alyssa Naeher *	GK	115	0	December 18, 2014	Argentina	December 3, 2024	Netherlands
Christine Nairn	MF	2	1	May 25, 2009	Canada	July 22, 2009	Canada
Natalie Neaton (Note: Married name is Simpson)	FW	6	4	January 23, 1995	Australia	December 16, 1998	Ukraine
Jenna Nighswonger *	MF	20	2	December 2, 2023	China	February 26, 2025	Japan
Jill Oakes	MF	1	0	March 13, 2005	Denmark	March 13, 2005	Denmark
Kelley O'Hara	DF	160	3	March 28, 2010	Mexico	August 6, 2023	Sweden
Ayo Oke *	DF	1	1	January 27, 2026	Chile	January 27, 2026	Chile
Emily Oleksiuk (Note: Married name is Shaw)	GK	2	0	March 13, 2001	Portugal	March 17, 2001	Norway
Heather O'Reilly (Note: Married name is Werry)	MF	231	47	March 1, 2002	Sweden	September 15, 2016	Thailand
Ann Orrison (Note: Married name is Germain)	DF	5	0	August 18, 1985	Italy	July 9, 1986 (match 2)	Canada
Leslie Osborne	MF	61	3	January 30, 2004	Sweden	July 22, 2009	Canada
Carla Overbeck (Note: Née Werden)	DF	170	7	June 5, 1988	Czechoslovakia	December 17, 2000	Japan
Jaime Pagliarulo	GK	3	0	May 4, 1997	South Korea	June 30, 2001	Canada
Cindy Parlow Cone	FW	158	75	January 14, 1996	Russia	December 8, 2004	Mexico
Avery Patterson *	DF	14	1	April 5, 2025	Brazil	June 9, 2026	Brazil
Christie Pearce (Note: Married name was previously Rampone until 2017)	DF	311	4	February 28, 1997	Australia	September 20, 2015	Haiti
Tammy Pearman	DF	9	1	August 6, 1995	Norway	May 11, 1997	England
Emily Pickering (Note: Married name is Harner)	MF	15	2	August 21, 1985	Denmark	August 16, 1992	Norway
Carson Pickett *	DF	2	0	June 28, 2022	Colombia	October 11, 2022	Spain
Louellen Poore	DF	2	0	August 14, 1992	Norway	August 16, 1992	Norway
Christen Press	FW	155	64	February 9, 2013	Scotland	August 5, 2021	Australia
Nandi Pryce	DF	8	0	January 7, 2000	Czech Republic	July 7, 2000	Italy
Midge Purce *	FW	30	4	November 10, 2019	Costa Rica	March 10, 2024	Brazil
Caroline Putz (Note: Married name is Leith)	FW	1	1	July 7, 2000	Italy	July 7, 2000	Italy
Debbie Rademacher (Note: Née Belkin)	DF	50	2	July 7, 1986	Canada	November 24, 1991	Chinese Taipei
Sarah Rafanelli	FW	35	8	August 14, 1992	Norway	August 3, 1995	Australia
Alyssa Ramsey	FW	8	0	February 6, 2000	Norway	March 17, 2001	Norway
Sara Randolph	DF	2	0	March 7, 2001	Italy	March 13, 2001	Portugal
Megan Rapinoe	MF	203	63	July 23, 2006	Republic of Ireland	September 24, 2023	South Africa
Lilly Reale *	DF	9	0	June 26, 2025	Republic of Ireland	April 17, 2026	Japan
Danielle Reyna (Note: Née Egan)	MF	6	1	March 14, 1993	Germany	July 17, 1993	China
Kathy Ridgewell-Williams	FW	3	0	August 18, 1985	Italy	July 11, 1987	Norway
Stephanie Rigamat	FW	7	1	January 11, 2001	China	March 17, 2001	Norway
Tiffany Roberts (Note: Married name is Sahaydak)	MF	112	7	March 16, 1994	Portugal	October 3, 2004	New Zealand
Trinity Rodman *	FW	57	13	February 17, 2022	Czech Republic	June 9, 2026	Brazil
Amy Rodriguez (Note: Married name is Shilling)	FW	132	30	March 11, 2005	Finland	September 4, 2018	Chile
Izzy Rodriguez *	DF	2	1	June 29, 2025	Republic of Ireland	January 24, 2026	Paraguay
Shauna Rohbock	FW	1	0	December 16, 1998	Ukraine	December 16, 1998	Ukraine
Nancy Rohrman (Note: Née Kramarz)	MF	6	1	April 10, 1993	Germany	July 14, 1993	Russia
Christy Rowe Estlund	MF	1	0	January 18, 1996	Ukraine	January 18, 1996	Ukraine
Tara Rudd *	DF	12	0	February 20, 2025	Colombia	March 7, 2026	Colombia
Jill Rutten	MF	1	0	September 12, 1998	Mexico	September 12, 1998	Mexico
Yazmeen Ryan *	FW	16	2	October 24, 2024	Iceland	January 27, 2026	Chile
Emily Sams *	DF	10	1	October 27, 2024	Iceland	April 14, 2026	Japan
Ashley Sanchez *	MF	28	3	November 27, 2021	Australia	October 30, 2024	Argentina
Keri Sanchez (Note: Married name is Raygor)	DF	13	0	April 2, 1991	Bulgaria	July 3, 2001	Canada
Becky Sauerbrunn	DF	219	0	January 16, 2008	Canada	March 3, 2024	Colombia
Kelly Schmedes (Note: Née Wilson)	FW	4	1	March 3, 2002	England	March 11, 2005	Finland
Meghan Schnur	DF	6	0	February 24, 2010	Iceland	July 17, 2010	Sweden
Laura Schott	FW	5	1	March 7, 2001	Italy	March 17, 2001	Norway
Laurie Schwoy	FW	4	0	May 31, 1997	Canada	February 24, 1999	Finland
Briana Scurry	GK	175	0	March 16, 1994	Portugal	November 5, 2008	South Korea
Emma Sears *	FW	21	6	October 27, 2024	Iceland	June 9, 2026	Brazil
Gina Segadelli (Note: Née Cassella)	FW	2	1	August 14, 1992	Norway	August 16, 1992	Norway
Ally Sentnor *	MF	23	7	November 30, 2024	England	June 9, 2026	Brazil
Nikki Serlenga	MF	30	6	January 7, 2000	Czech Republic	July 3, 2001	Canada
Jaedyn Shaw *	FW	37	10	October 26, 2023	Colombia	June 6, 2026	Brazil
Danielle Slaton	DF	43	1	February 24, 1999	Finland	November 2, 2003	Mexico
Gayle Smith Wilson	MF	2	0	August 14, 1992	Norway	August 16, 1992	Norway
Taylor Smith	DF	10	0	July 27, 2017	Australia	March 4, 2018	France
Hope Solo	GK	202	0	April 5, 2000	Iceland	August 12, 2016	Sweden
Emily Sonnett *	DF	118	2	October 25, 2015	Brazil	June 9, 2026	Brazil
Zola Springer (Note: Name was previously Carolyn Springer, now uses the name N. Zola Solamente)	DF	9	0	August 14, 1992	Norway	July 17, 1993	China
Sam Staab *	DF	2	0	June 2, 2024	South Korea	June 5, 2024	South Korea
Thori Staples Bryan	DF	65	1	March 11, 1993	Denmark	June 14, 2003	Republic of Ireland
Amy Steadman	DF	4	0	March 11, 2001	Canada	March 17, 2001	Norway
Jill Stewart (Note: Married name is Glosemeyer)	DF	2	0	October 9, 1997	Germany	October 30, 1997	Sweden
Jennifer Strong	DF	1	0	August 16, 1992	Norway	August 16, 1992	Norway
Andi Sullivan *	MF	52	3	October 19, 2016	Switzerland	October 26, 2023	Colombia
Mallory Swanson (Note: Née Pugh) *	FW	103	38	January 23, 2016	Republic of Ireland	October 30, 2024	Argentina
Lori Sweeney (Note: Née Bylin)	MF	4	0	August 18, 1985	Italy	August 24, 1985	Denmark
Janine Szpara	GK	6	0	July 20, 1986	China	July 11, 1987	Norway
Lindsay Tarpley (Note: Married name is Snow)	FW	125	32	January 12, 2003	Japan	May 14, 2011	Japan
Alyssa Thompson *	FW	32	4	October 7, 2022	England	June 6, 2026	Brazil
Gisele Thompson *	DF	11	0	February 20, 2025	Colombia	June 6, 2026	Brazil
Chris Tomek	MF	12	0	July 7, 1986	Canada	December 19, 1987	Canada
Rita Tower	FW	6	0	April 10, 1993	Germany	April 14, 1994	Canada
India Trotter	FW	2	0	January 18, 2006	Norway	January 30, 2007	China
Phallon Tullis-Joyce *	GK	7	0	April 5, 2025	Brazil	April 14, 2026	Japan
Reilyn Turner *	F	1	0	January 24, 2026	Paraguay	January 24, 2026	Paraguay
Erika Tymrak	MF	3	1	September 3, 2013	Mexico	February 8, 2014	Russia
Rachel Van Hollebeke (Note: Née Buehler)	DF	113	5	March 5, 2008	China	March 9, 2015	Iceland
M.A. Vignola *	DF	1	0	September 21, 2023	South Africa	September 21, 2023	South Africa
Tisha Venturini (Note: Married name is Hoch)	MF	134	47	August 14, 1992	Norway	March 16, 2000	Sweden
Aly Wagner	MF	131	21	December 16, 1998	Ukraine	November 8, 2008	South Korea
Abby Wambach	FW	255	184	September 9, 2001	Germany	December 16, 2015	China
Marcie Ward (Note: Married name is Laderman)	MF	3	0	March 7, 2001	Italy	March 13, 2001	Portugal
Kealia Watt (Note: Née Ohai)	FW	3	1	October 23, 2016	Switzerland	November 13, 2016	Romania
Morgan Weaver *	FW	2	0	November 27, 2021	Australia	November 30, 2021	Australia
Saskia Webber	GK	28	0	August 14, 1992	Norway	February 6, 2000	Norway
Kristen Weiss	FW	4	0	March 7, 2001	Italy	March 17, 2001	Norway
Christie Welsh	FW	39	20	January 7, 2000	Czech Republic	July 30, 2006	Canada
Kennedy Wesley *	DF	7	1	October 29, 2025	New Zealand	June 9, 2026	Brazil
Sara Whalen (Note: Married name is Hess)	MF	65	7	April 24, 1997	France	December 10, 2000	Mexico
Kacey White (Note: Married name is Burke)	MF	18	0	November 2, 2006	Netherlands	October 29, 2009	Germany
Cat Whitehill (Note: Née Reddick)	DF	134	11	July 7, 2000	Italy	March 31, 2010	Mexico
Kate Wiesner *	DF	3	0	November 28, 2025	Italy	January 17, 2026	Italy
Sophia Wilson (Note: Née Smith) *	FW	63	25	November 27, 2020	Netherlands	June 9, 2026	Brazil
Staci Wilson	DF	15	0	January 23, 1995	Australia	July 23, 1996	Sweden
Kim Wyant	GK	9	0	August 18, 1985	Italy	August 8, 1993	Canada
Lily Yohannes *	MF	20	1	June 5, 2024	South Korea	June 9, 2026	Brazil
Veronica Zepeda Cashman (Note: Zepeda Cashman was also capped to the Mexico senior national team.)	FW	5	1	December 16, 1998	Ukraine	July 7, 2000	Italy
McCall Zerboni	MF	9	0	October 22, 2017	South Korea	April 7, 2019	Belgium
Gretchen Zigante (Note: Née Gegg)	GK	2	0	July 9, 1986 (match 2)	Canada	July 27, 1990	Canada

== See also ==
- USWNT All-Time Best XI
- List of United States men's international soccer players
- List of women's footballers with 100 or more international caps
- List of women's footballers with 100 or more international goals
