= History of the United States women's national soccer team =

The history of the United States women's national soccer team began in 1985 — the year when the United States women's national soccer team played its first match.

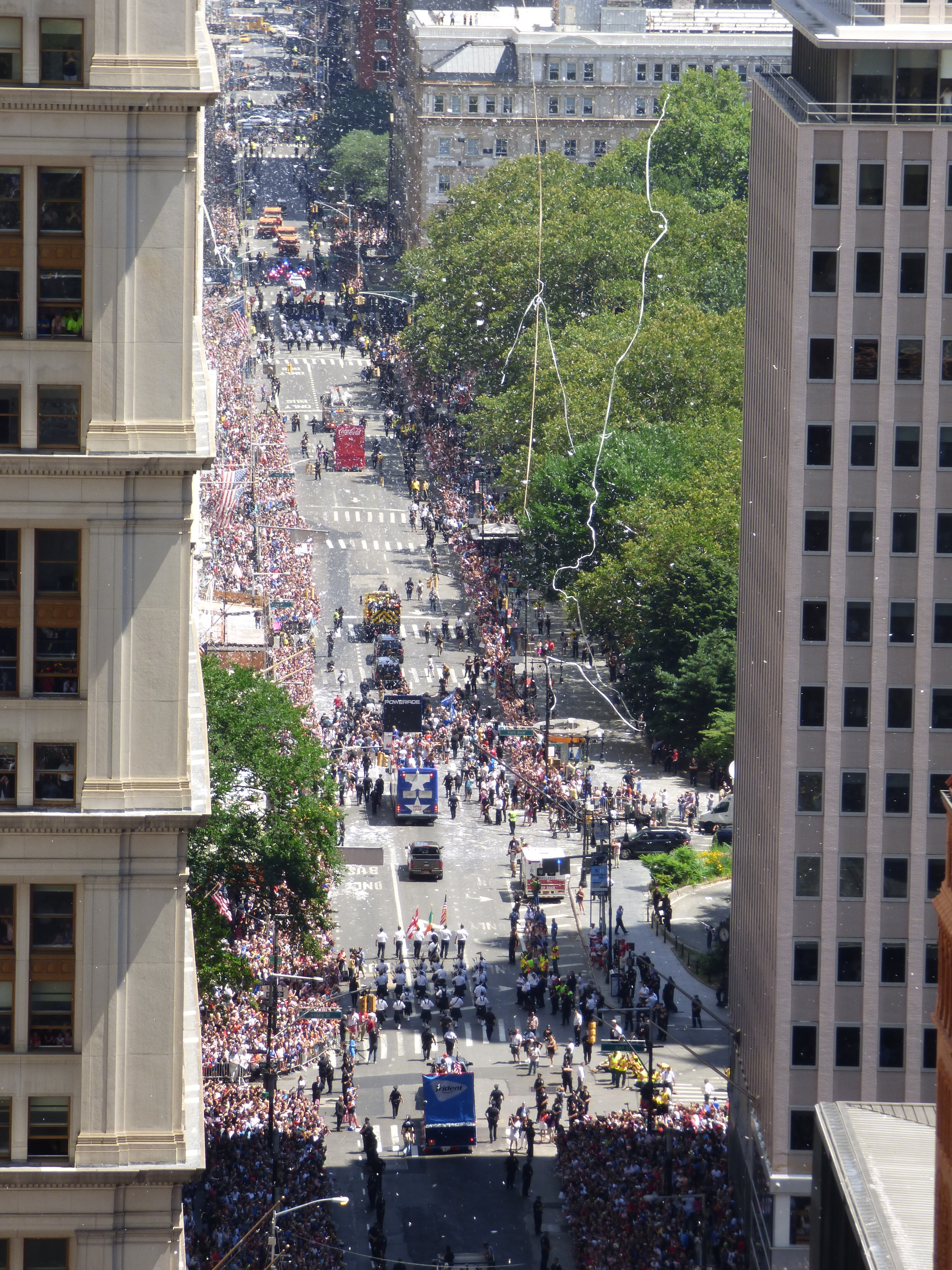
A parade in the Canyon of Heroes in Lower Manhattan, celebrating the winning of the 2015 FIFA Women's World Cup

== History ==
=== Origins in 1985 ===
A national women's soccer team had been selected in 1982, 1983, and 1984 but never played together. Club teams had represented the United States in international tournaments, with the Dallas Sting winning the first title for the United States at a FIFA-sanctioned world tournament in 1984. With interest growing in women's soccer, about 70 women, mostly players on University teams, were invited to Baton Rouge, Louisiana to participate in the 1985 Olympic Sports Festival, the first time women's soccer was included among the events. As the players sat on the field at the end of the festival, coach Mike Ryan selected a team of 17 players, all under 25 years of age to play in a tournament in Jesolo, Italy. The team was issued men's practice uniforms and practiced for three days at the C.W. Post campus of Long Island University. Team members were each given a pair of cleats and $10 a day for food, and sewed the "USA" decal on the front of their shirts the night before flying to Italy.

The Italians greeted the American team enthusiastically and chanted "Ooosa!" (USA), a pre-game chant that the U.S. team adopted for itself. The U.S. team responded by leading a cheer for the Italian team during a game. The Americans were the guests of honor at a rock concert and Michelle Akers, Emily Pickering, and Linda Gancitano were invited to model clothing for a photo shoot. The Americans were unaccustomed to the large and enthusiastic crowds, numbering several thousand people, attending the games.

All did not go well on the playing field for the American team. In their first match, on August 18, 1985, the Americans, accustomed to a polite women's game as it was then in the United States, were out-played by an experienced and physical Italian team and lost 1–0. Carolina Morace struck the Italians' winning goal. Akers and Pickering missed that game because of injuries. On August 21, the U.S. team found their footing and tied Denmark 2-2, with Akers and Pickering scoring goals. They then lost to England and to Denmark in a rematch.

The team disbanded after the Jesolo tournament. A national team with several new players and a new coach, Anson Dorrance, reassembled in 1986 to play again in Jesolo and at the national soccer complex in Blaine, Minnesota. The team record was better in 1986, with five wins and two losses.

Coaches
Name	birthdate	WNT coaching years	University	position	career matches	comments
Mike Ryan	February 14, 1935	1985		Head coach		A steelworker and soccer coach in Seattle
Roger Rogers		1985		Assistant coach		Founder, Women's Soccer World Magazine

Players
Name	Birthdate	WNT team member years	University	Position	Career caps (goals)	Notes
Michelle Akers	February 1, 1966	1985–2000	Central Florida	forward	153 (105)	Against Denmark, scored first US international goal.
Pam Baughman Cornell	October 25, 1962	1985	George Mason		4 (1)	
Denise Bender	July 29, 1959	1985	Washington	defender	4 (0)	Team captain
Denise Boyer-Merdich	June 8, 1962	1985–1987	Puget Sound	midfielder	7 (l)	
Tara Buckley	November 1, 1962	1985	Connecticut		2 (0)	
Lori Bylin	October 8, 1964	1985	Puget Sound		4 (0)	
Stacey Enos	February 4, 1964	1985–1986	North Carolina	defender	10 (0)	
Linda Gancitano	January 24, 1962	1985	Central Florida	defender	2 (0)	Substitute for Denise Bender in first international game; torn ACL in 1986 ended career
Cindy Gordon	November 14, 1962	1985–1988	Western Washington	midfielder	6 (0)	
Ruth Harker	June 28, 1963	1985	Missouri – St. Louis	goalkeeper	2 (0)	
Tuca Healey	September 20, 1962	1985	California	forward	3 (0)	
Lori Henry	March 20, 1966	1985–1991	North Carolina	defender	39 (3)	
Sharon McMurtry	October 31, 1960	1985–1986	Seattle	midfielder	6 (0)	inaugural U.S. Soccer Female Athlete of the Year in 1985
Ann Orrison	June 29, 1961	1985–1986	Virginia	defender	5 (0)	
Emily Pickering	February 1, 1963	1985–1992	North Carolina	midfielder	15 (2)	Assist on first US international goal; scored second goal against Denmark
Kathy Ridgewell	May 18, 1965	1985–1987	Western Washington		3 (0)	
Kim Wyant	February 11, 1964	1985–1987, 1993	Central Florida	goalkeeper	9 (0)	

Results
Date	Location	Opponent	Result	U.S. scorers
August 18, 1985	Jesolo, Italy	Italy	Loss 0–1	
August 21, 1985	Jesolo, Italy	Denmark	Tie 2–2	Akers, Pickering
August 23, 1985	Caorle, Italy	England	Loss 1–3	Akers
August 24, 1985	Jesolo, Italy	Denmark	Loss 0–1	

=== 1990s and 2000s ===
In March 2004, two of its stars, Mia Hamm (who retired later that year after a post-Olympic team tour of the US) and Michelle Akers (who had already retired), were the only two women and the only two Americans named to the FIFA 100, a list of the 125 greatest living soccer players chosen by Pelé as part of FIFA's centenary observances. Those two women along with Julie Foudy, Kristine Lilly, and the 1999 team started a revolution towards women's team sports in America. The USWNT won every game they played in this tournament. In their group stage, they beat Denmark 3–0 at Giants Stadium just outside New York City, they then thrashed Nigeria 7–1 at Soldier Field in Chicago and finally they beat North Korea 3–0 at Foxboro Stadium near Boston. Going into the knockout stage, they then beat a fancied Germany 3–2 at Jack Kent Cooke Stadium just outside the American capital of Washington, D.C. and the USWNT then traveled to the San Francisco Bay Area to beat Brazil 2–0 at Stanford Stadium in Palo Alto. And then, they traveled to Los Angeles to play China at the Rose Bowl in Pasadena for the final match which would decide the winner of this most prestigious tournament.

This 1999 World Cup final match was arguably the USWNT's most influential and memorable victory. It came when they defeated China 5–4 in a penalty shoot-out following a 0–0 draw after extended time. With this win they emerged onto the world stage and brought significant media attention to women's soccer and athletics. On July 10, 1999, over 90,000 people (the largest ever for a women's sporting event and one of the largest attendances in the world for a tournament game final) filled the Rose Bowl to watch the United States play China in the Final. After a back and forth game, the score was tied 0–0 at full-time, and remained so after extra time, leading to a penalty kick shootout. With Briana Scurry's save of China's third kick, the score was 4–4 with only Brandi Chastain left to shoot. She scored and won the game for the United States. Chastain famously dropped to her knees and whipped off her shirt, celebrating in her sports bra, which later made the cover of Sports Illustrated and the front pages of newspapers around the country and world.

=== 2011 ===
Perhaps the second most influential victory came on July 10, 2011, in the quarterfinal of the 2011 Women's World Cup in Germany, where the U.S. defeated Brazil 5–3 on penalty kicks. Brazil had annihilated the USA in the previous world cup (2007), handing the USA their worst defeat in the history of the program: 4–0 in the semifinal. Coming into the match, the USA had never failed to advance to the semifinal round in (women's) world cup history. Brazil also featured reigning five time Fifa Women's World Player of the Year, Marta. Brazil had been finalists in the past three major international tournaments (2004 and 2008 Olympics; 2007 World Cup), but had yet to win a championship. Thanks to a blistering cross by Shannon Boxx and a charging run by Abby Wambach, the USA forced an own goal in the opening minutes of the match and went up 1–0. Midway through the second half, Marta made a run at the USA's goal and USA defender Rachel Buehler challenged. The referee, Jacqui Melksham, ruled it a foul, gave Brazil a penalty kick, and red carded Buehler, sending her off in the 65th minute. Hope Solo saved the initial penalty kick made by Cristiane, but this was controversially overruled by the referee, and the penalty kick was ordered to be retaken. Marta converted, tying the game 1–1. Melksham initially claimed the reason for the red was that Hope Solo had stepped off the line. Solo was yellow-carded for either this offense or for protesting (the reason for the card was never confirmed). Video replay proved Solo had not come off the line, and after the match, the official record claimed that the true offense was a US player encroaching into the box before the initial PK was taken. In the first overtime, Marta scored, again controversially as the player who assisted her looked to be offsides, but this was not called. The US had less than 20 minutes to equalize, all while playing down a player since the 65th minute. In the 117th minute, the Brazilian Erika received a yellow card for gamesmanship, when she faked injury for several minutes, was placed on a stretcher and carried to the corner flag before she leapt off the stretcher and ran back onto the pitch. This confused everyone as to how much injury time was left. In the 121st minute, Carli Lloyd took a shot and missed, giving possession back to Brazil. Cristiane took the ball to the USA's corner and stood on it, wanting to waste the clock. USA captain Christie Rampone pressured her to pass and the ball was intercepted by Ali Krieger. Krieger passed to Lloyd who dribbled upfield and drew several Brazilian players, leaving Megan Rapinoe open on the wing. Lloyd passed to Rapinoe who hugged the sideline. Just past the midstripe, Rapinoe hammered a left-footed (she's dominantly right-footed) 45 yard cross to the Brazilian back post where Abby Wambach was crashing. It was the 122nd minute, and Abby scored on her signature header. The goal was called the "Header Heard Round the World" and it tied the game 2–2. It has been voted the greatest goal in US soccer history and the greatest goal in women's world cup history. Commentator Ian Darke shouted, "OH DO YOU BELIEVE THIS?! ABBY WAMBACH HAS JUST SAVED THE USA'S LIFE IN THIS WORLD CUP!" and later, "Brazil is denied at the death!" All of the USA's penalty kick takers – Shannon Box, Carli Lloyd, Abby Wambach, Megan Rapinoe, and Ali Krieger – converted their PKs. Hope Solo saved Daiane's attempt at a PK, allowing the US to win 5–3 in PKs. Solo was named MVP of the match. Coincidentally, the USA-Brazil match (nicknamed the "Miracle in Dresden") was played on the 12th anniversary of the memorable 1999 World Cup Final (described above), which the US also won on penalty kicks. Brianna Scurry and Hope Solo each made a save on the third PK taker, and the USA players who scored the winning penalty kicks (Brandi Chastain and Ali Krieger, respectively) were both defenders who did not normally take PKs.

=== 2012–13 ===
In the 2012 Summer Olympics, the U.S. won the gold medal for the fourth time in five Olympics by defeating Japan 2–1 in front of 80,203 fans at Wembley Stadium, a record for a women's soccer game at the Olympics. The United States advanced to face Japan for the gold medal after the 2011 Women's World Cup Final, won by the Japanese in a penalty shoot-out, by winning arguably one of the greatest games only rivaled by the victories mentioned above. In the semi-final match against Canada, the Americans trailed three times before Alex Morgan's header in the third minute of injury time at the end of 30 minutes of extra-time lifted the team to a 4–3 victory. Morgan's game-winning goal (123') is now the latest tally ever in a FIFA competition. The London Olympics marked the first time the USWNT won every game en route to the gold medal and set an Olympic women's team record of 16 goals scored. Wambach scored a team-leading five goals in five straight games, which is a U.S. and Olympic record, while Morgan and Rapinoe led the team with four assists apiece, which attributed to their team-high tying 10 points. By scoring both goals in the 2012 Olympic final, Carli Lloyd is the only woman in history to score the winning goal in separate gold Olympic matches (2008 and 2012).

In late 2012 U.S. Soccer (along with the Canadian Soccer Association and Mexican Football Federation) announced it would subsidize formation of the new National Women's Soccer League starting in 2013, following previous termination of the Women's United Soccer Association and Women's Professional Soccer leagues. Stated benefits to the women's national team included providing "competitive games week in and week out against the other best players in the country as well as some international players", and giving "opportunities to players who may not have the chance in the past to play for the national team or to players who have been on the fringes but have not been able to break into the squad."

In the 2013 season, USA had an undefeated record of 14–0–2 with their last win against Brazil with a score of 4–1 as part of a longer 43-game unbeaten streak that spanned two years. The USA's 43-game unbeaten streak came to an end after a 1–0 loss against Sweden in the 2014 Algarve Cup. The streak began with a 4–0 win over Sweden in the 2012 Algarve Cup after a 1–0 loss against Japan. The USWNT's 104-game home unbeaten streak ended on December 16, 2015 with a 1–0 loss to China.

In December 2013, the USWNT All-Time Best XI was chosen by the United States Soccer Federation. Goalie: Brianna Scurry; Defenders: Brandi Chastain, Carla Overbeck, Christie Rampone, Joy Fawcett; Midfielders: Kristine Lilly, Michelle Akers, Julie Foudy; Forwards: Mia Hamm, Abby Wambach, Alex Morgan

=== 2015 ===
On July 5, 2015, USA defeated Japan 5–2 in the final of the 2015 World Cup, claiming their third Women's World Cup title and their first since 1999. Carli Lloyd scored three goals in 16 minutes, including one from 56.9 yards out, achieving the fastest hat-trick from kick-off in World Cup history, not to be confused with the record for briefest hat-trick (time between first and third goals), which is 5 minutes. With Lloyd's third goal, Telemundo announcer, Andres Cantor, shouted "GOOOOOOAL!" for nearly forty seconds. Lauren Holiday scored the winning goal and Tobin Heath scored the USA's fifth goal. With about 10 minutes left, Abby Wambach was subbed into the game, and it was the last World Cup match she would participate in. The fans greeted her with a standing ovation and chanted her name. Lloyd, wanting to honor Abby further, placed the captain's band on her when she entered. Lloyd said, "I wanted to make sure she put the armband on because she deserves it. She has been legendary to this team. She's been unbelievable. I'm so thankful I can call her my friend, my teammate, and I'm just so proud her last World Cup she could go out strong." As Abby entered the match, she high-fived her long time friend and Japanese legend Homare Sawa, who, like Abby, was playing in her final World Cup. Sawa had been subbed into the match in the first half. In the 86th minute, longtime team captain Christie Rampone was subbed into the game and became the oldest player to ever play in a Women's World Cup final. The crowd roared, as this was a further nod of respect from Ellis' 2015 world champion squad to the 1999 championship team. Rampone was the only member of the squad to have been in both championship teams.

While no one pulled a Brandi Chastain in 2015, new enduring images of celebration emerged. Carli Lloyd crying on the field with a relieved grin; Ali Kreiger crying on the same field where she tore her ACL in 2012; Sydney Leroux embracing her husband in the stands, showing that men can be just as supportive of their spouses as their wives are for them; golden confetti showering a victorious USA team as the captains dually lift the trophy. But perhaps the most famous celebration was when Abby Wambach ran to the sideline and kissed her wife, Sara Huffman, whom she had married in 2013. During the 2015 tournament, the Supreme Court of the United States ruled it unconstitutional to deny same-sex couples the right to marriage (Huffman and Wambach were not denied the right to marriage by their state, though prior to the 2015 SCOTUS decision, several states were attempting to make or had made same-sex marriages illegal). While Wambach and Huffman traditionally kept a low profile about their relationship, their kiss was broadcast live and the image went viral with the hashtag #LoveWins on Twitter. Wambach reflected, "It's definitely not something that I ever considered before it happened. It was just in the moment and that's something that I'm proud of — that we could maybe move the needle into [a] more open-minded and accepting frame of mind… Hopefully, if that can help one person feel more confident about their life, then I'm proud." President Obama acknowledge the moment as well when honoring the team at the white house, saying that she and her wife had showed how far America had come, on and off the field. The victory made the team the first in history to have won three Women's World Cup titles, becoming the most successful team in the tournament to date.

Following their most recent World Cup win, the team was honored with their own ticker tape parade in New York City, the first for a women's sports team, and they also received the Outstanding Team award during the 2015 ESPY Awards and a Teen Choice Award for Favourite Female Athlete(s). They were honored by Glamour Magazine as "Women of the Year." Sports Illustrated celebrated them with 25 covers of the magazine – one of several members of the team, one of Head Coach Jill Ellis, and then one cover for each member of the 23 player squad The team was again honored on October 27, 2015, when President Barack Obama welcomed them to the White House. The president stated, "This team taught all America's children that playing like a girl means you're a badass." He then amended, saying perhaps he should use a different word choice, and said, "Playing like a girl means you're the best."

=== 2016 ===
The USWNT's success ushered in an uncertain following year. In the second of two matches against China later that year, the USWNT lost for the first time on US soil since 2004. 2016 then saw the US only manage a draw against Colombia in the final group stage match of the Olympic soccer tournament, which was followed by a draw against rival Sweden on August 12, 2016 in the quarter-finals. During the penalty kick phase that followed the overtime period, Alex Morgan had her kick blocked by Sweden's GK and Christen Press's PK missed the Goal entirely – giving Sweden the win by a 4–3 PK margin. The devastating loss marked the only time that the USWNT did not advance to the gold medal game of the Olympics. It was also the first time that the USWNT failed to advance to the semi-final round of a major tournament. Shortly afterwards, US Goal Keeper Hope Solo made news by suggesting that Sweden's game strategy and excessively 'safe' style of play was inconsistent with the spirit of the sport which is commonly called 'the beautiful game'. Solo's use of the word 'cowards' to describe Sweden's players drew criticism from multiple sources, including at least one of her current teammates, along with ex-USWNT player and ESPN Commentator, Julie Foudy. On August 24, 2016, US Soccer's governing body suspended Solo for 6 months. Hope Solo is appealing the suspension.

== Competitive record ==
The two highest-profile tournaments the U.S. team participates in are the quadrennial FIFA Women's World Cup and the quadrennial Olympic Games.

=== World Cup ===
The team has participated in every Women's World Cup through 2023. They have won four world championships.

FIFA Women's World Cup record
Year	Result	Matches	Wins	Draws	Losses	GF	GA	Coach
(China) 1991	Champions	6	6	0	0	25	5	Anson Dorrance
(Sweden) 1995	Third place	6	4	1	1	15	5	Tony DiCicco
(United States) 1999	Champions	6	5	1	0	18	3	Tony DiCicco
(United States) 2003	Third place	6	5	0	1	15	5	April Heinrichs
(China) 2007	Third place	6	4	1	1	12	7	Greg Ryan
(Germany) 2011	Runners-up	6	3	2	1	13	7	Pia Sundhage
(Canada) 2015	Champions	7	6	1	0	14	3	Jill Ellis
(France) 2019	Champions	7	7	0	0	26	3	Jill Ellis
(Australia) / (New Zealand) 2023	Round of 16	4	1	3	0	4	1	Vlatko Andonovski
Total		54	41	9	4	142	39	

=== Olympic Games ===
The team has participated in every Olympic tournament since the introduction of the women's event in 1996. They have won five gold medals.

(International Olympic Committee) Olympic Games record
Year	Result	Matches	Wins	Draws	Losses	GF	GA	Coach
(United States) 1996	Gold medal	5	4	1	0	9	3	Tony DiCicco
(Australia) 2000	Silver medal	5	3	1	1	9	5	April Heinrichs
(Greece) 2004	Gold medal	6	5	1	0	12	4	April Heinrichs
(China) 2008	Gold medal	6	5	0	1	12	5	Pia Sundhage
(United Kingdom) 2012	Gold medal	6	6	0	0	16	6	Pia Sundhage
(Brazil) 2016	Quarter-finals	4	2	2	0	6	3	Jill Ellis
(Japan) 2020	Bronze medal	6	2	2	2	12	9	Vlatko Andonovski
(France) 2024	Gold medal	6	6	0	0	12	2	Emma Hayes
Total		44	33	7	4	88	37	

=== CONCACAF W Championship ===
The CONCACAF W Championship is the confederation's qualifying tournament for the Women's World Cup. It has been previously known by various names including CONCACAF Women's Championship and CONCACAF Women's Gold Cup.

The 2022 tournament also serves as a qualifying event for the 2024 Summer Olympics tournament and the CONCACAF W Gold Cup, a new tournament not to be confused with one of this tournament's prior names of CONCACAF Women's Gold Cup.

CONCACAF Championship record
Year	Result	Matches	Wins	Draws	Losses	GF	GA	Coach
(Haiti) 1991	Champions	5	5	0	0	49	0	Anson Dorrance
(United States) 1993	Champions	3	3	0	0	13	0	Anson Dorrance
(Canada) 1994	Champions	4	4	0	0	16	1	Tony DiCicco
(Canada) 1998	Did not participate^{1}							
(United States) 2000	Champions	5	4	1	0	24	1	April Heinrichs
(United States) (Canada) 2002	Champions	5	5	0	0	24	1	April Heinrichs
(United States) 2006	Champions	2	2	0	0	4	1	Greg Ryan
(Mexico) 2010	Third place	5	4	0	1	22	2	Pia Sundhage
(United States) 2014	Champions	5	5	0	0	21	0	Jill Ellis
(United States) 2018	Champions	5	5	0	0	26	0	Jill Ellis
(Mexico) 2022	Champions	5	5	0	0	13	0	Vlatko Andonovski
Total		44	42	1	1	212	6	

^{1} The US team directly qualified for the 1999 FIFA Women's World Cup as hosts of the event. Because of this, they did not participate in the 1998 CONCACAF Championship, which was the qualification tournament for the World Cup.

=== CONCACAF W Gold Cup ===
First held in 2024, the CONCACAF W Gold Cup is an international tournament for the confederation's national women's teams, including several non-CONCACAF invitees.

CONCACAF W Gold Cup record
Year	Result	Matches	Wins	Draws	Losses	GF	GA	Coach
(United States) 2024	Champions	6	4	1	1	15	4	Twila Kilgore
Total		6	4	1	1	15	4	

=== CONCACAF Women's Olympic qualifying tournament ===
From 2004 to 2020, the CONCACAF Women's Olympic Qualifying Tournament was the confederation's qualifying tournament for the Olympic Games.

For the 2024 Summer Olympics the winner of the 2022 CONCACAF W Championship qualified for the 2024 tournament, while the second and third-placed teams advanced to a CONCACAF Olympic play-off, where the winner of the play-off qualified for the Olympics.

CONCACAF Women's Olympic Qualifying Tournament record
Year	Result	Matches	Wins	Draws	Losses	GF	GA	Coach
(Costa Rica) 2004	Champions	5	5	0	0	24	2	April Heinrichs
(Mexico) 2008	Champions	5	4	1	0	13	2	Pia Sundhage
(Canada) 2012	Champions	5	5	0	0	38	0	Pia Sundhage
(United States) 2016	Champions	5	5	0	0	23	0	Jill Ellis
(United States) 2020	Champions	5	5	0	0	25	0	Vlatko Andonovski
Total		25	24	1	0	123	4	

=== Algarve Cup ===
The Algarve Cup is a global invitational tournament for national teams in women's soccer hosted by the Portuguese Football Federation (FPF). Held annually in the Algarve region of Portugal since 1994, it is one of the most prestigious women's football events, alongside the Women's World Cup and Women's Olympic Football.

Algarve Cup record
Year	Result	Matches	Wins	Draws	Losses	GF	GA	Coach
(Portugal) 1994	Runners-up	3	2	0	1	6	1	Tony DiCicco
(Portugal) 1995	4th place	4	2	1	1	8	5	Tony DiCicco
(Portugal) 1996	Did not enter							
(Portugal) 1997	Did not enter							
(Portugal) 1998	Third place	4	3	0	1	10	6	Tony DiCicco
(Portugal) 1999	Runners-up	4	2	1	1	8	4	Tony DiCicco
(Portugal) 2000	Champions	4	4	0	0	11	1	April Heinrichs
(Portugal) 2001	6th place	4	1	0	3	5	9	April Heinrichs
(Portugal) 2002	5th place	4	2	1	1	8	6	April Heinrichs
(Portugal) 2003	Champions	4	2	2	0	5	2	April Heinrichs
(Portugal) 2004	Champions	4	3	0	1	11	5	April Heinrichs
(Portugal) 2005	Champions	4	4	0	0	9	0	Greg Ryan
(Portugal) 2006	Runners-up	4	2	2	0	9	1	Greg Ryan
(Portugal) 2007	Champions	4	4	0	0	8	3	Greg Ryan
(Portugal) 2008	Champions	4	4	0	0	12	1	Pia Sundhage
(Portugal) 2009	Runners-up	4	3	1	0	5	1	Pia Sundhage
(Portugal) 2010	Champions	4	4	0	0	9	3	Pia Sundhage
(Portugal) 2011	Champions	4	4	0	0	12	3	Pia Sundhage
(Portugal) 2012	Third place	4	3	0	1	11	2	Pia Sundhage
(Portugal) 2013	Champions	4	3	1	0	11	1	Tom Sermanni
(Portugal) 2014	7th place	4	1	1	2	7	7	Tom Sermanni
(Portugal) 2015	Champions	4	3	1	0	7	1	Jill Ellis
Total		79	56	11	12	172	62	

=== SheBelieves Cup ===
The SheBelieves Cup is a global invitational tournament organized by the United States Soccer Federation.

SheBelieves Cup record
Year	Result	Matches	Wins	Draws	Losses	GF	GA	Coach
(United States) 2016	Champions	3	3	0	0	4	1	Jill Ellis
(United States) 2017	4th place	3	1	0	2	1	4	Jill Ellis
(United States) 2018	Champions	3	2	1	0	3	1	Jill Ellis
(United States) 2019	Runners-up	3	1	2	0	5	4	Jill Ellis
(United States) 2020	Champions	3	3	0	0	6	1	Vlatko Andonovski
(United States) 2021	Champions	3	3	0	0	9	0	Vlatko Andonovski
(United States) 2022	Champions	3	2	1	0	10	0	Vlatko Andonovski
(United States) 2023	Champions	3	3	0	0	5	1	Vlatko Andonovski
(United States) 2024	Champions	2	1	1	0	4	3	Twila Kilgore
(United States) 2025	Runners-up	3	2	0	1	5	3	Emma Hayes
(United States) 2026	In progress	1	1	0	0	2	0	Emma Hayes
Total		30	22	5	3	54	18	

=== Tournament of Nations ===
The Tournament of Nations is a global invitational tournament organized by the United States Soccer Federation.

Tournament of Nations record
Year	Result	Matches	Wins	Draws	Losses	GF	GA	Coach
(United States) 2017	Runners-up	3	2	0	1	7	4	Jill Ellis
(United States) 2018	Champions	3	2	1	0	9	4	Jill Ellis
Total		6	4	1	1	16	8	

=== International Tournament of Brazil ===
International Women's Football Tournament of Brazil

International Tournament of Brazil record
Year	Result	Matches	Wins	Draws	Losses	GF	GA	Coach
(Brazil) 2014	Runners-up	4	1	2	1	10	4	Jill Ellis
Total		4	1	2	1	10	4	

=== Pan American Games ===
The Pan American Games are held in the same year as the FIFA Women's World Cup, and consequently the senior United States women's national soccer team never participated in the Pan American Games. However two youth teams did: an under-18 team participated in and won the inaugural women's soccer tournament at the 1999 Pan American Games, and an under-20 team lost in the final to a full Brazil team in the 2007 Pan American Games. Some of the players who participated in those Pan American Games, such as Hope Solo, Tobin Heath, Lauren Cheney (now Holiday), Cat Reddick (now Whitehill) and Kelley O'Hara, later played for the full national team.

== Yearly team summary ==
Year	M	W	D	L	GF	GA	Athlete of the Year	Scoring leader	G	Assist leader	A	Coach	Major tournam. result
1985	4	0	1	3	3	7	Sharon McMurtry	Michelle Akers	2			Mike Ryan	
1986	6	4	0	2	10	6	April Heinrichs	Marcia McDermott	4			Anson Dorrance	
1987	11	6	1	4	23	9	Carin Jennings-Gabarra	April Heinrichs	7			Anson Dorrance	
1988	8	3	2	3	10	9	Joy Fawcett	Carin Jennings-Gabarra	5	Carin Jennings-Gabarra, Kristine Lilly	2	Anson Dorrance	
1989	1	0	1	0	0	0	April Heinrichs	(none)		(none)		Anson Dorrance	
1990	6	6	0	0	26	3	Michelle Akers	Michelle Akers	9	Kristine Lilly	3	Anson Dorrance	
1991	28	21	1	6	122	22	Michelle Akers	Michelle Akers	39	Carin Jennings-Gabarra	21	Anson Dorrance	World Cup (champions)
1992	2	0	0	2	3	7	Carin Jennings-Gabarra	(3 players tied)	1	Tisha Venturini-Hoch	2	Anson Dorrance	
1993	17	13	0	4	54	7	Kristine Lilly	Mia Hamm	10	Michelle Akers	6	Anson Dorrance	
1994	13	12	0	1	59	6	Mia Hamm	Michelle Akers	11	Michelle Akers	7	Anson Dorrance	
1995	25	21	2	2	91	17	Mia Hamm	Mia Hamm	19	Mia Hamm	18	Tony DiCicco	World Cup (3rd place)
1996	24	21	2	1	80	17	Mia Hamm	Tiffeny Milbrett	13	Mia Hamm	18	Tony DiCicco	Olympics (gold medal)
1997	18	16	0	2	67	13	Mia Hamm	Mia Hamm	18	Tiffeny Milbrett	14	Tony DiCicco	
1998	25	22	2	1	89	12	Mia Hamm	Mia Hamm	20	Mia Hamm	20	Tony DiCicco	
1999	29	25	2	2	111	15	Michelle Akers	Tiffeny Milbrett	21	Mia Hamm	16	Tony DiCicco	World Cup (champions)
2000	41	26	9	6	124	31	Tiffeny Milbrett	Cindy Parlow Cone	19	Mia Hamm	14	Lauren Gregg, April Heinrichs	Olympics (silver medal)
2001	10	3	2	5	13	15	Tiffeny Milbrett	Tiffeny Milbrett	3	Mia Hamm	2	A. Heinrichs	
2002	19	15	2	2	69	11	Shannon MacMillan		17	Aly Wagner	11	A. Heinrichs	
2003	23	17	4	2	58	14	Abby Wambach		9	Mia Hamm	9	A. Heinrichs	World Cup (3rd place)
2004	34	28	4	2	104	23	Abby Wambach		31	Mia Hamm	22	A. Heinrichs	Olympics (gold medal)
2005	9	8	1	0	24	0	Kristine Lilly	Christie Welsh	7	Aly Wagner, Abby Wambach	5	Greg Ryan	
2006	22	18	4	0	57	10	Kristine Lilly	Abby Wambach	17	Abby Wambach	8	Greg Ryan	
2007	24	19	4	1	63	17	Abby Wambach	Abby Wambach	20	Kristine Lilly	8	Greg Ryan	World Cup (3rd place)
2008	36	33	2	1	84	17	Carli Lloyd	Natasha Kai	15	Heather O'Reilly, Abby Wambach	10	Pia Sundhage	Olympics (gold medal)
2009	8	7	1	0	12	1	Hope Solo	(3 players tied)	2	Heather O'Reilly	3	Pia Sundhage	
2010	18	15	2	1	48	8	Abby Wambach		16	Lori Lindsey	7	Pia Sundhage	
2011	20	13	4	3	41	17	Abby Wambach		8	Lauren Holiday, Megan Rapinoe	5	Pia Sundhage	World Cup (2nd place)
2012	32	28	3	1	120	21	Alex Morgan		28	Alex Morgan	21	P. Sundhage, Jill Ellis	Olympics (gold medal)
2013	16	13	3	0	56	11	Abby Wambach		11	Lauren Holiday, Abby Wambach	6	Tom Sermanni	
2014	24	16	5	3	79	15	Lauren Holiday	Carli Lloyd	15	Carli Lloyd	8	T. Sermanni, J. Ellis	
2015	26	20	4	2	74	12	Carli Lloyd	Carli Lloyd	18	Megan Rapinoe	10	J. Ellis	World Cup (champions)
2016	25	22	3	0	92	10	Tobin Heath	Carli Lloyd, Alex Morgan	17	Carli Lloyd	11	J. Ellis	Olympics (quarter-finals)
2017	16	12	1	3	40	13	Julie Ertz	Alex Morgan	7	Megan Rapinoe	5	J. Ellis	
2018	20	18	2	0	65	10	Alex Morgan	Alex Morgan	18	Megan Rapinoe	12	J. Ellis	
2019	24	20	3	1	77	16	Julie Ertz	Carli Lloyd	16	Christen Press	12	J. Ellis, Vlatko Andonovski	World Cup (champions)
2020	9	9	0	0	33	1	Sam Mewis	Lindsey Heaps, Christen Press	7	Lynn Biyendolo	6	V. Andonovski	
2021	24	17	5	2	76	12	Lindsey Heaps	Carli Lloyd	11	Carli Lloyd	6	V. Andonovski	Olympics (bronze medal)
2022	18	14	1	3	56	9	Sophia Wilson		11	Mallory Swanson	7	V. Andonovski	
2023	18	14	4	0	36	3	Naomi Girma	Mallory Swanson	7	Alex Morgan, Trinity Rodman	5	V. Andonovski, Twila Kilgore	World Cup (Round of 16)
2024	23	18	4	1	50	12	Alyssa Naeher	Sophia Wilson	9	Trinity Rodman, Sophia Wilson, Mallory Swanson	4	T. Kilgore, Emma Hayes	Olympics (gold medal)
2025	15	12	0	3	41	8	Rose Lavelle	Catarina Macario	8	Rose Lavelle, Catarina Macario, Ally Sentnor, Alyssa Thompson	3	E. Hayes	
2026	12	8	1	3	22	6	TBD	TBD		TBD		E. Hayes	
Total	783	613	92	78	2,364	473							

== Past and present uniforms ==
The USWNT has worn a combination of red, white, or blue (the colors of the national flag) in most years, with exceptions including a gold shirt in 2007, a black shirt in 2011, and black trim with neon green socks for the 2015 World Cup. In 2012 the team started wearing the same kit as the U.S. men's team, beginning with the red and white hoop design. Nike became the kit supplier for U.S. Soccer in 1995, with an agreement signed in December 2013 to extend the sponsorship through 2022. The USWNT began wearing two stars as of 1999 to signify their two World Cup titles. A third star was added July 2015 and a fourth in July 2019 after winning the World Cup in those same years.

1986–1996 home	1986–1996	1991–1994	1991–1994	1991–1998	1999 home
1999 away	1999–2004	2000–2002	2003	2003	2004
2004	2005–2007 home	2005–2007 away	2007–2009 home	2007–2009 home	2007–2008 away
2008–2009 away	2010–2011 home	2010–2011 away	2011–2012 home	2011–2012 away	2012–2013 home "The Waldo"
2012–2013 away	2013 home	2014– 2015 home	2014–2015 away "Popsicle"	2015–2016 home	2015–2016 away
2016 home	2016 away	2017 third	2019 home	2019 away	2020 home
2020 away	2021–22 home	2021–22 away	2022–23 home	2022–23 away	2023 home
2023 away	2024 home	2024 away
