= List of sportswomen =

This is a list of female athletes by sport. Each section is ordered alphabetical by the last name (originally or most commonly known). For specific groupings, see Category:Sportswomen.

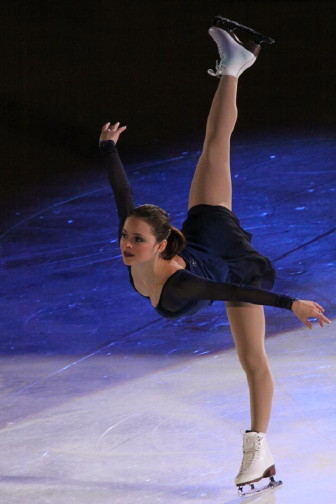
Sasha Cohen

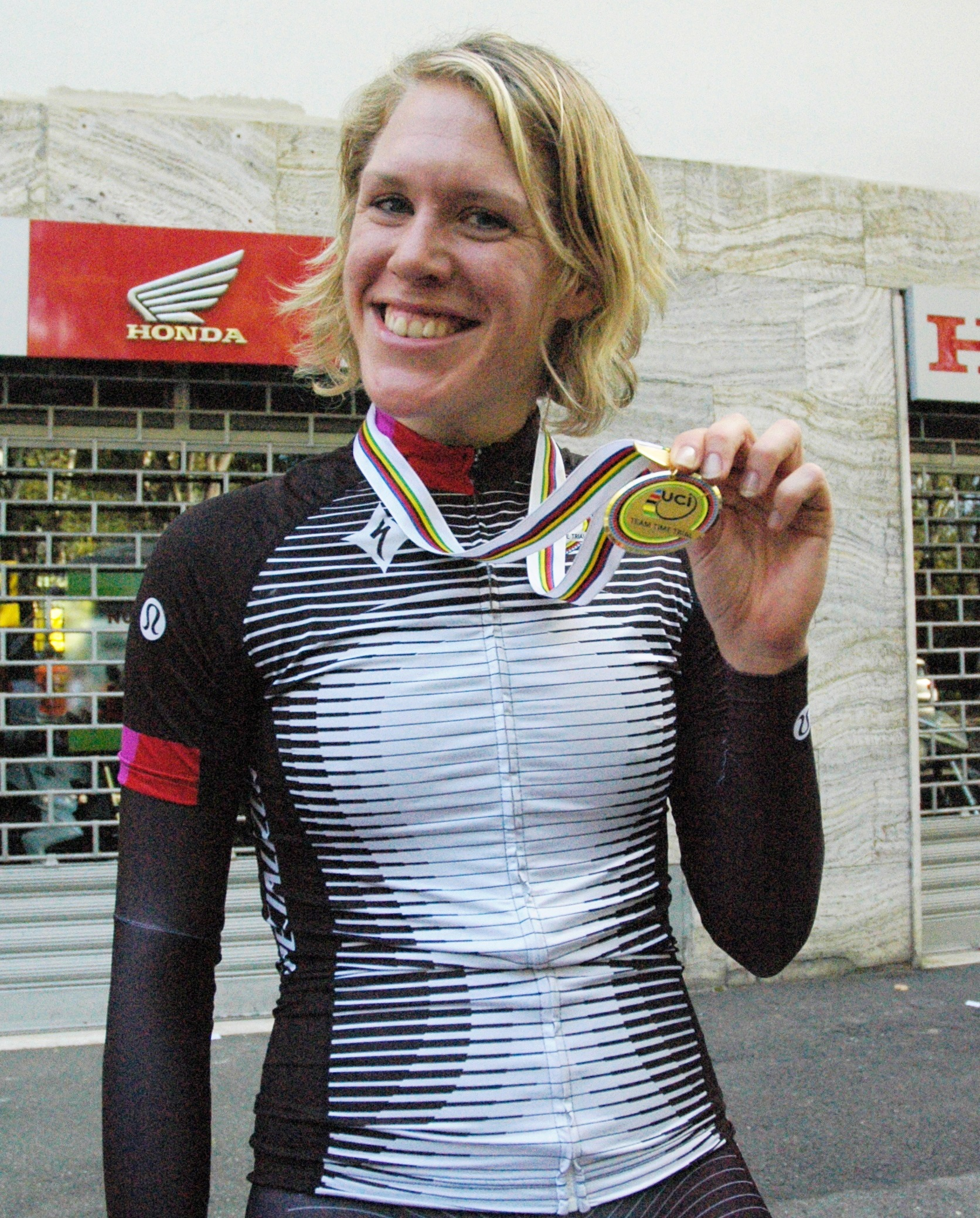
Ellen van Dijk

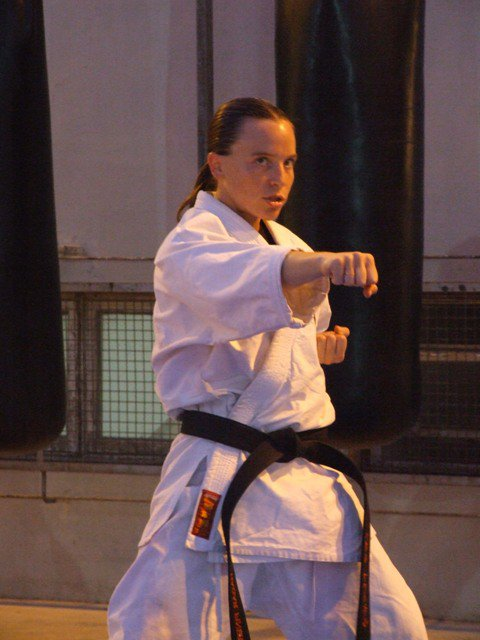
Hagar Finer

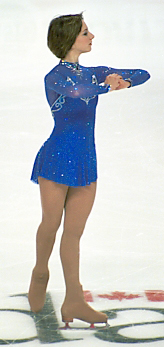
Sarah Hughes

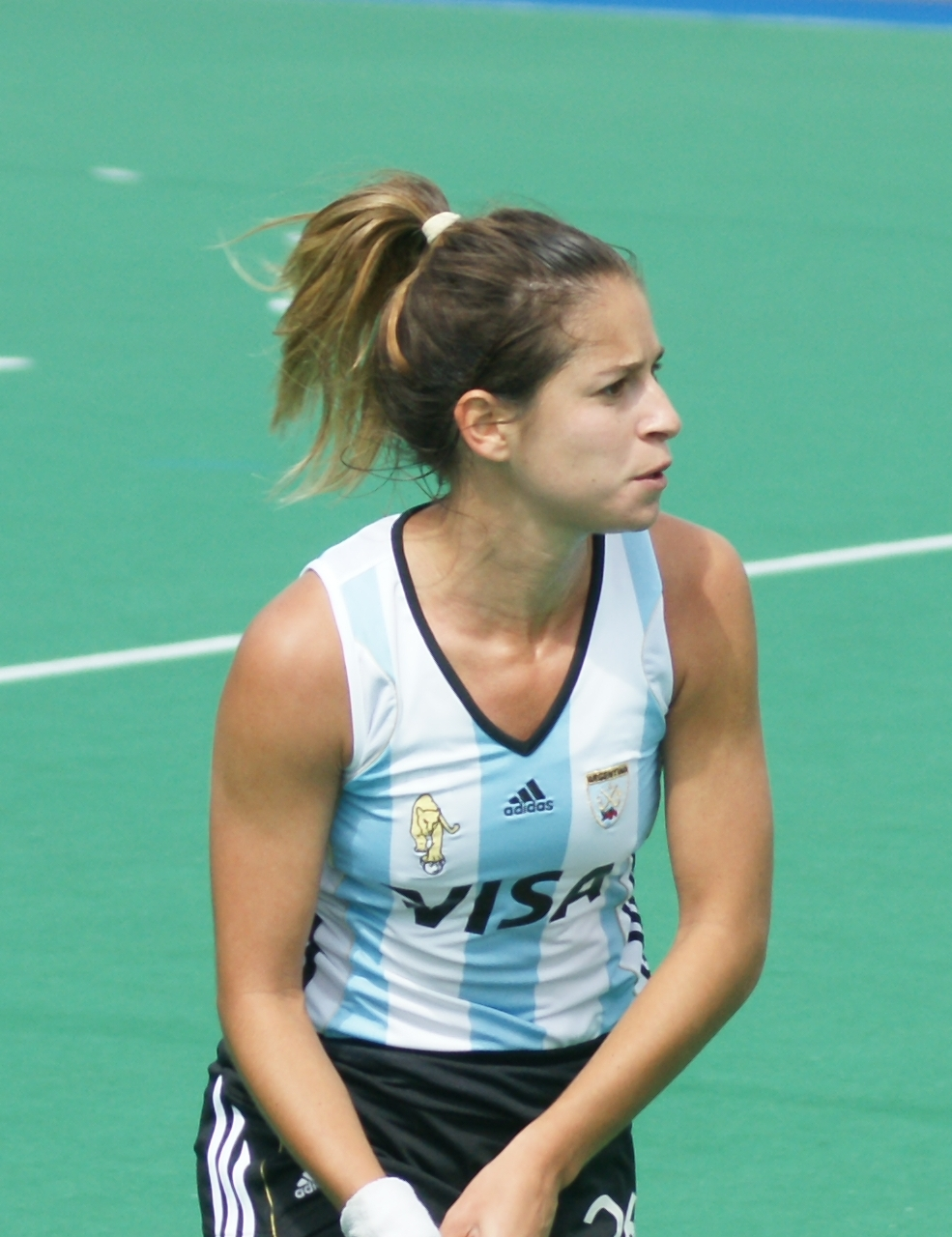
Giselle Kañevsky

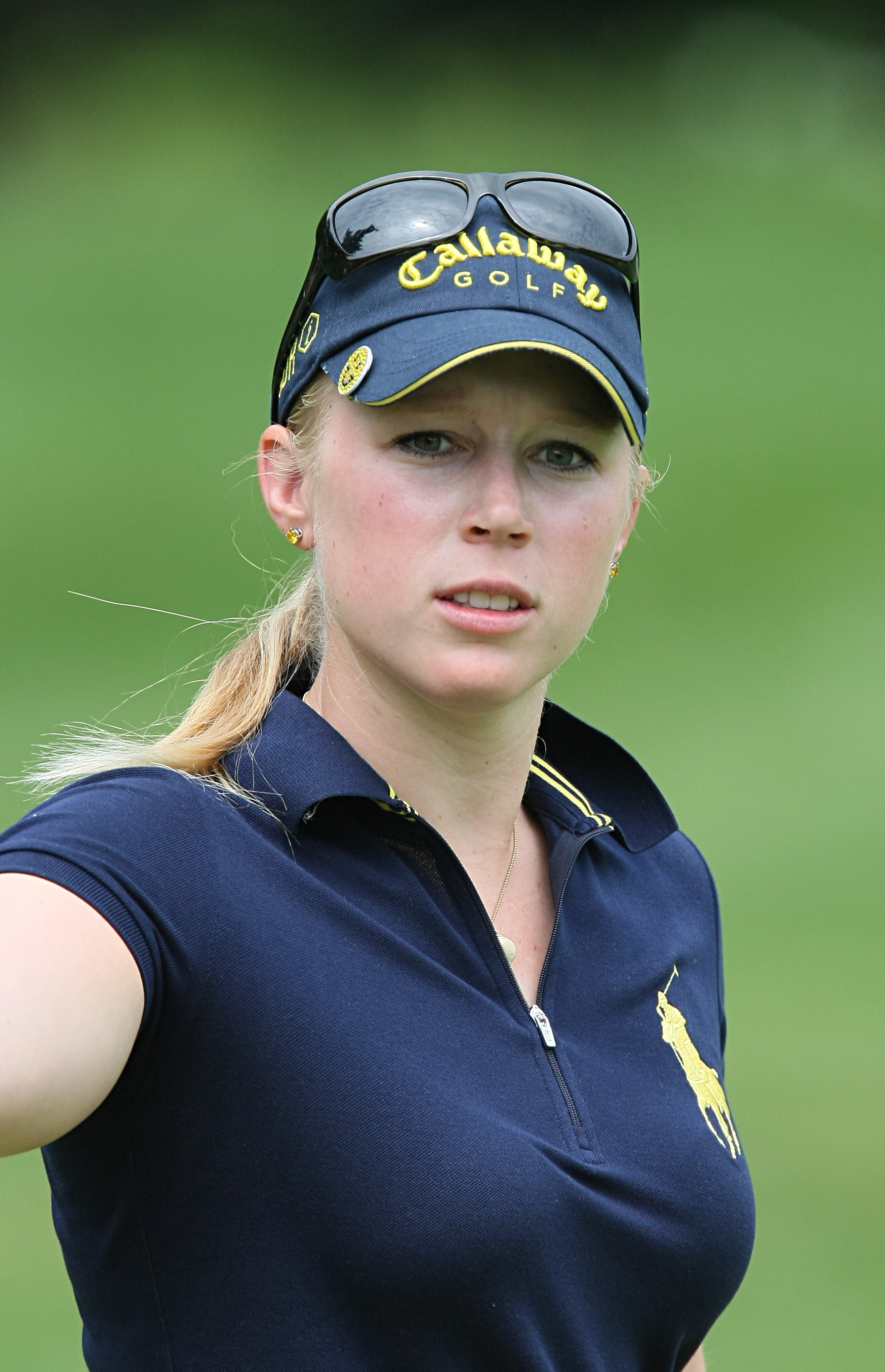
Morgan Pressel

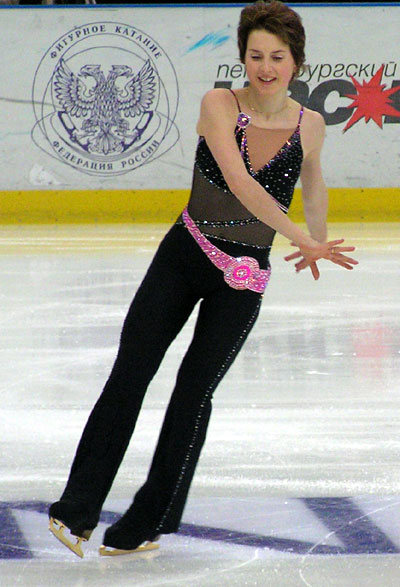
Irina Slutskaya

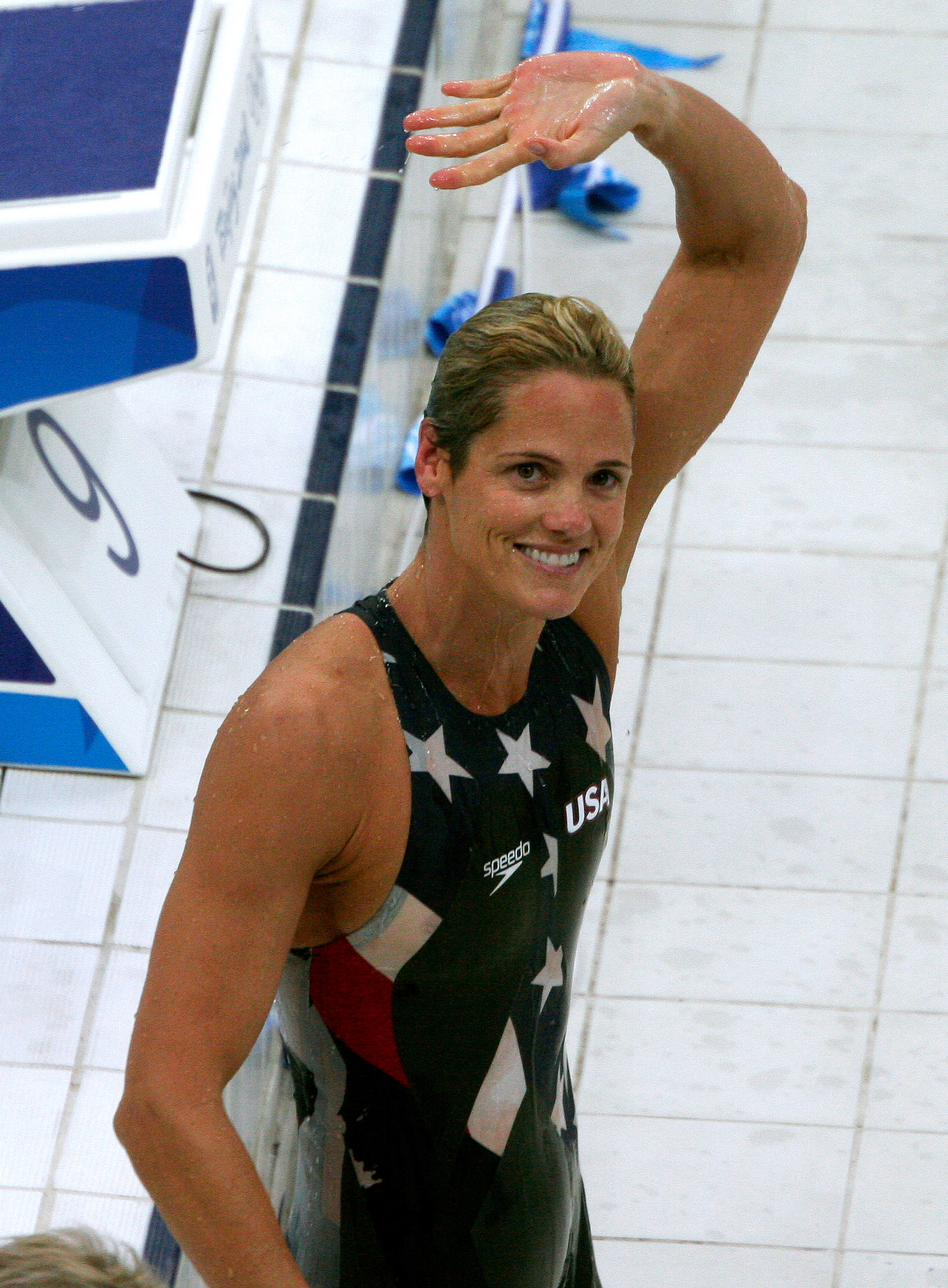
Dara Torres, 4x Olympic champion swimmer

== American football ==
- Tonya Butler
- Sami Grisafe
- Julie Harshbarger
- Liz Heaston
- Katie Hnida
- Ashley Martin
- Anita Marks
- Patricia Palinkas
- Natalie Randolph
- Sarah Schkeeper
- Lei'D Tapa
- Jennifer Welter
- Alissa Wykes

== Archery ==
- Danielle Brown
- Lindsey Carmichael
- Miroslava Cerna
- Mel Clarke
- Gizem Girişmen
- Fu Hongzhi
- Gao Fangxia
- Kim Ki Hee
- Kim Ran Sook
- Lenka Kuncova
- Louise Nettleton
- Małgorzata Olejnik
- Lee Hwa Sook
- Marketa Sidkova
- Xiao Yanhong

== Athletics ==
- Veronica Campbell-Brown - 7 Olympic medals
- Allyson Felix - 6 Olympic medals
- Evelyn Ashford - 5 Olympic medals
- Sanya Richards-Ross - 5 Olympic medals
- Fanny Blankers-Koen - 4 Olympic medals
- Betty Cuthbert - 4 Olympic medals
- Cathy Freeman - 2 Olympic medals in running
- Kim Gevaert - sprint runner
- Florence Griffith Joyner - 5 Olympic medals
- Wilma Glodean Rudolph - 4 Olympic medals in athletics
- Kelly Holmes - 3 Olympic medals in middle distance running
- Jackie Joyner-Kersee - 6 Olympic medals in athletics
- Ewa Kłobukowska -- world/European championships and records; discriminated and victimized by the world sport establishment, and especially by the Soviet Union and East Germany.
- Zhanna Pintusevich-Block - sprint runner, world 100-m & 200-m champion
- Tamara Press - 6 world records (shot put & discus throw); 3x Olympic champion (2x shot put & discus)
- Irina Press - sprint runner, 2x Olympic champion (80-m hurdles & pentathlon)
- Paula Radcliffe - long distance runner
- Bobbie Rosenfeld - runner & long jumper, world record (100-yard dash); Olympic champion (4x100-m relay)
- Joan Benoit Samuelson - Olympic medal in marathon running
- Helen Stephens - 2 Olympic medals in athletics
- Shirley Strickland - 7 Olympic medals
- Irena Szewińska - sprinter & long jumper, 7 Olympic medals; world records (100-m, 200-m, and 400-m)
- Grete Waitz - marathon running
- Fatima Whitbread - 2 Olympic medals in javelin throw
- Bärbel Wöckel - 4 Olympic medals
- Joanna Zeiger - triathlete, Ironman 70.3 World champion; world record (half ironman)
- Catherine Ibargüen - Colombian athlete, 2018 IAAF Female athlete of the year award, 2 Olympic medals in triple

== Basketball ==
- Sue Bird, 4x WNBA champion, 5x Olympic champion
- Tamika Catchings, WNBA champion, 4x Olympic champion
- Caitlin Clark
- Margo Dydek
- Cynthia Cooper-Dyke, 4x WNBA champion, Olympic champion
- Lauren Jackson, 2x WNBA champion
- Nancy Lieberman, WNBA, Olympic silver
- Lisa Leslie, 2x WNBA champion, 4x Olympic champion
- Cheryl Miller, Olympic champion
- Maya Moore, 4x WNBA champion, 2x Olympic champion
- Candace Parker, 2x WNBA champion, 2x Olympic champion
- Katie Smith, 3x WNBA champion, 3x Olympic champion
- Dawn Staley, 3x Olympic champion
- Sheryl Swoopes, 4 WNBA champion, 3x Olympic champion,
- Diana Taurasi, 3x WNBA champion, 5x Olympic champion

== Boxing ==
- Laila Ali
- Cecilia Brækhus
- Marie-Eve Dicaire
- Marlen Esparza
- Seniesa Estrada
- Jacqui Frazier
- Natasha Jonas
- Savannah Marshall
- Christy Martin
- Jessica McCaskill
- Claressa Shields
- Amanda Serrano
- Katie Taylor

== Cycling ==
- Elisa Longo Borghini
- Emma Pooley

== Fastpitch and Softball ==
- Monica Abbott
- Christie Ambrosi
- Crystl Bustos
- Lauren Chamberlain
- Jenny Dalton
- Lisa Fernandez
- Jennie Finch
- Tairia Flowers
- Amanda Freed
- Michele Granger
- Lauren Haeger
- Tanya Harding
- Lovieanne Jung
- Danielle Lawrie
- Jessica Mendoza
- Stacey Nuveman
- Cat Osterman
- Dot Richardson
- Michele Mary Smith
- Natasha Watley

== Fencing ==
- Emily Jacobson - saber fencer
- Sada Jacobson - US saber fencer, ranked # 1 in the world, Olympic silver
- Helene Mayer - foil fencer, Olympic champion
- Maria Mazina - épée fencer, Olympic champion
- Ellen Osiier - foil fencer, Olympic champion
- Ellen Preis - foil fencing, 3x world champion (1947, 1949, and 1950), Olympic champion, 17x Austrian champion

== Field hockey ==
- Luciana Aymar - 4 Olympic medals
- Minke Booij - 3 Olympic medals
- Giselle Kañevsky - Olympic medal
- Natascha Keller - Olympic medal
- Maartje Paumen - 2 Olympic gold medals
- Fanny Rinne - Olympic medal

== Figure skating ==
- Mao Asada
- Oksana Baiul - Olympic champion and World Champion
- Ludmila Belousova
- Sasha Cohen - US Figure Skating Champion & Olympic silver
- Peggy Gale Fleming
- Dorothy Stuart Hamill
- Sarah Hughes - Olympic champion
- Yuna Kim
- Lily Kronberger - four-time World Champion, World Figure Skating Hall of Fame
- Michelle Kwan - two-time Olympic medalist, five-time World champion, and nine-time U.S. champion
- Emilia Rotter - four-time World Champion
- Irina Slutskaya - two-time World Champion
- Kristi Tsuya Yamaguchi - Olympic champion two-time World champion, U.S. champion

== Golf ==
- Amy Alcott - 5 LPGA majors
- Patty Berg - 15 LPGA majors
- Pat Bradley - 6 LPGA majors
- Juli Inkster - 7 LPGA majors
- Betsy King - 6 LPGA majors
- Nancy Lopez - 3 LPGA majors
- Betsy Rawls - 8 LPGA majors
- Patty Sheehan - 6 LPGA majors
- Annika Sörenstam - 10 LPGA majors
- Louise Suggs - 11 LPGA majors
- Karrie Webb - 7 LPGA majors
- Kathy Whitworth - 6 LPGA majors
- Michelle Wie - 1 LPGA major
- Mickey Wright - 13 LPGA majors

== Gymnastics ==
- Estella Agsteribbe - Olympic champion (team combined exercises)
- Polina Astakhova - 10 Olympic medals
- Simone Biles - 11 Olympic medals
- Věra Čáslavská - 11 Olympic medals
- Nadia Comăneci - 9 Olympic medals
- Gabby Douglas - 3 Olympic medals
- Laurie Hernandez - 4 Olympic medals
- Shawn Johnson - 4 Olympic medals
- Ágnes Keleti - 10 Olympic medals
- Madison Kocian - 4 Olympic medals
- Olga Korbut - 6 Olympic medals
- Larisa Latynina - 18 Olympic medals
- Tatiana Lysenko - 3 Olympic medals
- Aly Raisman - 6 Olympic medals
- Mary Lou Retton - 5 Olympic medals
- Yelena Shushunova - two-time Olympic champion (all-around, team)

== Ice hockey ==
- Karyn Bye
- Natalie Darwitz
- Danielle Goyette
- Cammi Granato
- Geraldine Heaney
- Jayna Hefford
- Angela James
- Caroline Ouellette
- Cherie Piper
- Manon Rhéaume
- Angela Ruggiero
- Kim St-Pierre
- Hayley Wickenheiser

== Martial arts ==
- Laila Ali - boxing
- Gina Carano - mixed martial arts
- Dakota Ditcheva - Muay Thai
- Hagar Finer - WIBF bantamweight boxing champion
- Megumi Fujii - mixed martial arts
- Joanna Jędrzejczyk - mixed martial arts
- Cristiane Justino - mixed martial arts
- Daniela Krukower - World Judo Champion
- Christy Martin - boxing
- Elaina Maxwell - mixed martial arts
- Ronda Rousey - mixed martial arts
- Miesha Tate - mixed martial arts

== Motorsport ==
- Janet Guthrie - 11th at Indianapolis 500
- Brittany Force - NHRA champion
- Jutta Kleinschmidt - Dakar Rally winner
- Katherine Legge - IMSA race winner
- Ellen Lohr - DTM race winner
- Elena Myers - AMA Supersport race winner
- Michèle Mouton - World Rally Championship runner-up
- Shirley Muldowney - NHRA champion
- Danica Patrick - IndyCar race winner
- Angelle Sampey - NHRA champion
- Laia Sanz - Trial world champion
- Lyn St. James - 9th at Indianapolis 500
- Desiré Wilson - World Sportscar Championship race winner

== Real tennis ==
- Penny Fellows Lumley

== Roller derby ==
- Ann Calvello
- Joan Weston

== Rugby ==
- Maggie Alphonsi
- Enya Breen
- Charlotte Caslick
- Rochelle Clark
- Kendra Cocksedge
- Lauren Doyle
- Magali Harvey
- Janai Haupapa
- Natasha Hunt
- Zenay Jordaan
- Huriana Manuel
- Katherine Merchant
- Ana Poghosian
- Emily Scarratt
- Cheryl Soon
- Portia Woodman

== Skiing ==
- Marit Bjørgen - 10 Olympic medals
- Yuliya Chepalova - 6 Olympic medals
- Aleisha Cline - Canadian cross skier, medalist at Winter X Games
- Marja-Liisa Kirvesniemi - 7 Olympic medals
- Janica Kostelić - 6 Olympic medals (4 gold)
- Galina Kulakova - 8 Olympic medals
- Larisa Lazutina - 7 Olympic medals
- Raisa Smetanina - 10 Olympic medals
- Yelena Välbe - 7 Olympic medals
- Lyubov Yegorova - 9 Olympic medals

== Snowboarding ==
- Gretchen Bleiler
- Torah Bright
- Kelly Clark
- Tess Coady
- Linn Haug
- Elena Hight
- Kaitlyn Farrington
- Anna Gasser
- Jenny Jones
- Chloe Kim
- Maddie Mastro
- Silje Norendal
- Hannah Teter
- Alena Zavarzina

== Soccer ==
- Michelle Akers
- Nadine Angerer
- Yael Averbuch
- Lauren Barnes
- Denise Bender
- Verónica Boquete
- Shannon Boxx
- Lucy Bronze
- Brandi Chastain
- Stephanie Cox
- Julie Ertz
- Joy Fawcett
- Jess Fishlock
- Mia Hamm
- Pernille Harder
- Ada Hegerberg
- Lori Henry
- Jenni Hermoso
- Marbella Ibarra
- Nahomi Kawasumi
- Sam Kerr
- Fran Kirby
- Haley Kopmeyer
- Sydney Leroux
- Kristine Lilly
- Kim Little
- Carli Lloyd
- Shannon MacMillan
- Marta
- Kate Markgraf
- Merritt Mathias
- Sharon McMurtry
- Alex Morgan
- Heather Mitts
- Heather O'Reilly
- Ann Orrison
- Cindy Parlow
- Emily Pickering
- Birgit Prinz
- Christen Press
- Alexia Putellas
- Christie Rampone
- Megan Rapinoe
- Cat Reddick
- Briana Scurry
- Eudy Simelane
- Christine Sinclair
- Kelly Smith
- Hope Solo
- Aly Wagner
- Abby Wambach
- Chloe Williams
- Kim Wyant

== Surfing ==
- Keely Andrew
- Heather Clark
- Courtney Conlogue
- Johanne Defay
- Sage Erickson
- Sally Fitzgibbons
- Maya Gabeira
- Stephanie Gilmore
- Bethany Hamilton
- Coco Ho
- Malia Jones
- Silvana Lima
- Malia Manuel
- Caroline Marks
- Carissa Moore
- Lakey Peterson
- Nikki Van Dijk
- Tatiana Weston-Webb

== Swimming ==
- Rebecca Adlington - 4 Olympic medals
- Inge de Bruijn - 8 Olympic medals
- Amy Van Dyken - 6 Olympic medals
- Krisztina Egerszegi - 7 Olympic medals
- Dawn Fraser - 8 Olympic medals
- Otylia Jędrzejczak
- Debbie Meyer - 3 Olympic Gold medals. 200,400,800 freestyle 1968. 15 individual World Records.
- Stephanie Rice - 3 Olympic medals
- Keena Rothhammer - Olympic champion (800-m freestyle) and world champion (200-m freestyle); International Swimming Hall of Fame
- Éva Székely - 2 Olympic medals
- Jenny Thompson - 12 Olympic medals
- Dara Torres - 12 Olympic medals

== Table tennis ==
- Angelica Rozeanu - 17x table tennis world champion, Hall of Fame
- Anna Sipos - 11x world table tennis champion, Hall of Fame

== Tennis ==
- Victoria Azarenka - 2 Grand Slam singles titles
- Ashleigh Barty - 3 Grand Slam singles titles
- Jennifer Capriati - 3 Grand Slam singles titles
- Margaret Court - 24 Grand Slam singles titles (11 in open-era)
- Lindsay Davenport - 3 Grand Slam singles titles
- Evonne Goolagong - 7 Grand Slam singles titles
- Chris Evert - 18 Grand Slam singles titles
- Steffi Graf - 22 Grand Slam singles titles
- Justine Henin - 7 Grand Slam singles titles
- Martina Hingis - 5 Grand Slam singles titles
- Helen Jacobs - world singles ranking # 1
- Billie Jean King - 12 Grand Slam singles titles
- Angelique Kerber - 3 Grand Slam singles titles
- Kim Clijsters - 4 Grand Slam singles titles
- Ilana Kloss - world doubles ranking # 1
- Garbiñe Muguruza - 2 Grand Slam singles titles
- Li Na - 2 Grand Slam singles titles
- Martina Navratilova - 18 Grand Slam singles titles
- Naomi Osaka - 4 Grand Slam singles titles
- Agnieszka Radwańska - world singles ranking # 2
- Arantxa Sánchez - 4 Grand Slam singles titles
- Monica Seles - 9 Grand Slam singles titles
- Maria Sharapova - 5 Grand Slam singles titles
- Iga Świątek - 5 Grand Slam singles titles
- Serena Williams - 23 Grand Slam singles
- Venus Williams - 7 Grand Slam singles titles
- Caroline Wozniacki - One Grand Slam singles title

== Track and field ==
- Kajsa Bergqvist - high jumping
- Rebekah Colberg - Olympic medals in discus and javelin throw
- Jessica Ennis-Hill
- Allyson Felix
- Cathy Freeman
- Yelena Isinbayeva
- Carmelita Jeter
- Marion Jones
- Florence Griffith Joyner
- Jackie Joyner-Kersee
- Ann Penelope Marston - Archery
- Wilma Glodean Rudolph
- Mary Decker
- Babe Didrikson Zaharias

== Volleyball ==
- Foluke Akinradewo, 3 Olympic medals
- Lindsey Berg, 2 Olympic medals
- Jordan Larson, 3 Olympic medals
- April Ross, 3 Olympic medals
- Danielle Scott-Arruda, 2 Olympic medals
- Logan Tom, 2 Olympic medals
- Misty May-Treanor, 3 Olympic medals
- Kerri Walsh Jennings, 4 Olympic medals

== Other sports ==
- Kayla Harrison - 2 Olympic Gold Medals & 2 Pan American Games Gold Medals in Judo
- Josée Auclair - explorer
- Ann Bancroft - explorer
- Bonnie Kathleen Blair - speedskater
- Susan Butcher - sled dog musher
- Zefania Carmel - world champion yachtsman
- Ellen van Dijk - world road and track cycling champion
- Vonetta Flowers - Olympic medal in bobsleigh
- Myriam Fox-Jerusalmi - slalom canoer, Olympic bronze (K-1 slalom), 5 golds at ICF Canoe Slalom World Championships (2x K-1, 3x K-1 team)
- Taoying Fu - 4 Paralympic medals in powerlifting
- Sue Sally Hale - Broke the gender barrier in American Polo, was the highest rated American woman polo player of her era.
- Liz Heaston - first woman to play and score in a college football game
- Debbie Lee - Australian rules football
- Judit Polgár - chess
- Libby Riddles - sled dog musher

== See also ==
- Lists of sportspeople
- Women's sports
- Women's National Team
- Women's professional sports
- Major women's sport leagues in North America
- International Women's Sports Hall of Fame
- Women's Basketball Hall of Fame
- Women's association football
- Women's Australian rules football
- All-American Girls Professional Baseball League players
