= Ridgewell (disambiguation) =

Ridgewell is a village in England.

Ridgewell may also refer to:

== People ==
- Derek Ridgewell (1945–1982), corrupt British Transport Police officer
- Kathy Ridgewell-Williams (born 1965), American soccer player
- Liam Ridgewell (born 1984), English footballer
- Lilian Ridgewell (1912–1970), English gymnast
- Samantha Ridgewell (born 1996), Canadian ice hockey player
- Thomas "TomSka" Ridgewell (born 1990), English internet personality

== Other uses ==
- Ridgewell (comics), a fictional character from The Adventures of Tintin
- RAF Ridgewell, a Royal Air Force station in Ridgewell

== See also ==
- George Ridgwell (1867–1935), British screenwriter and film director
- Ridgwell Cullum (Sidney Burghard; 1867–1943), British novelist
