= Estlund =

Estlund is a surname. Notable people with the surname include:

- Christy Rowe Estlund (born 1973), American soccer player
- Cynthia Estlund (born 1957), American legal scholar
- David Estlund, American philosopher
