= List of Golden Scarf recipients =

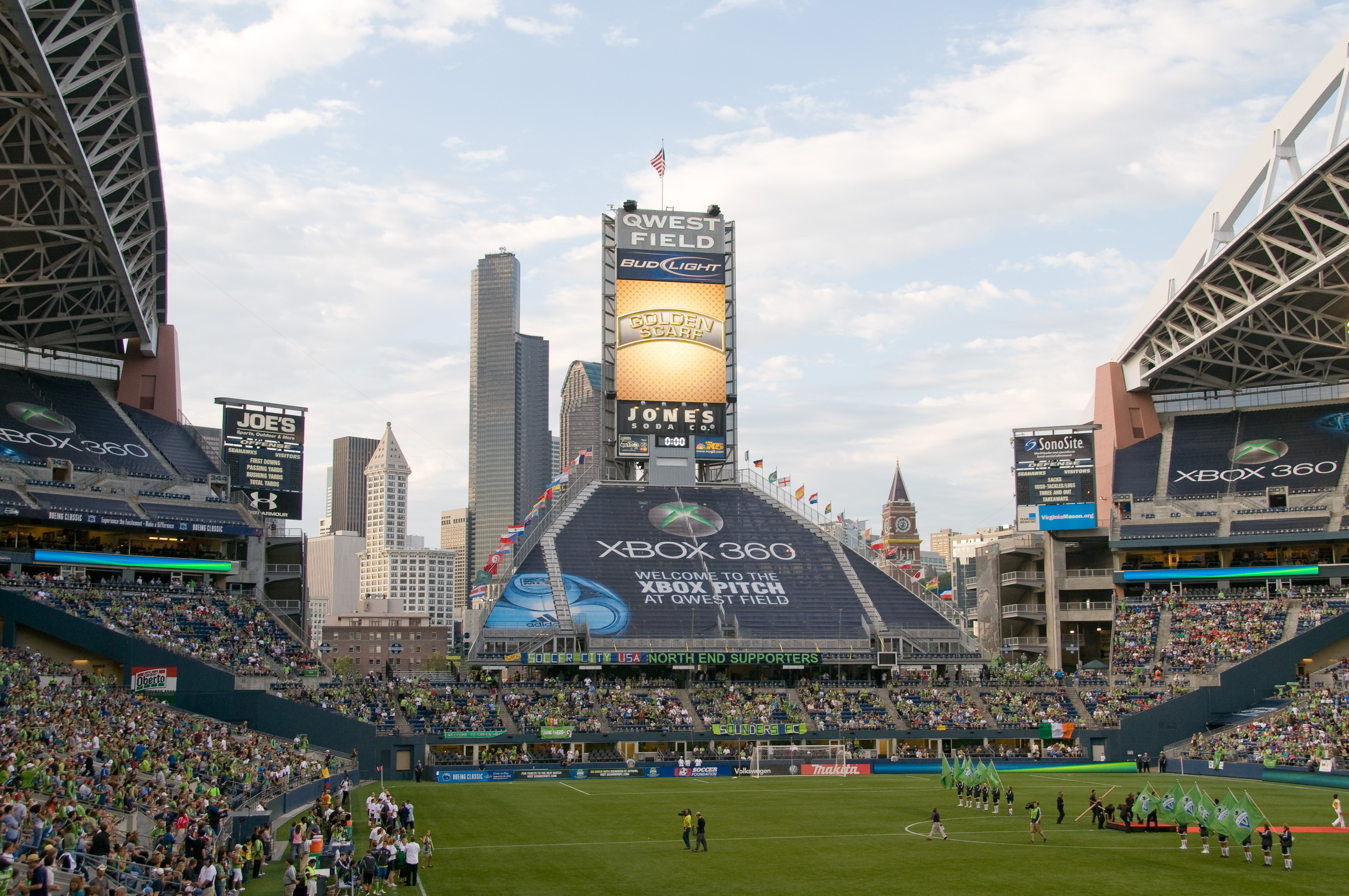
Ceremony before a Sounders match

The Golden Scarf is awarded by Seattle Sounders FC to "honor members of [the Seattle] community who are either part of the soccer scene or have done remarkable things for society in Seattle." It was renamed in honor of former majority owner Joe Roth in 2019.

During the pre-game ceremonies of the inaugural home match of the Sounders, a Golden Scarf emblazoned with the team name was awarded to MLS commissioner Don Garber. This began a tradition where, before each home game, the club likewise honors a member of the community who has contributed to soccer or society more generally in the Seattle area.

The recipient and the fans then raise their scarves over their heads together. The presenter of the Golden Scarf, usually a representative of the club's owners, is also acknowledged as part of the ceremony.

== 2009 Recipients ==
| Date | Opponent | Recipient | Notes |
|---|---|---|---|
| March 19, 2009 | New York Red Bulls | Don Garber | MLS commissioner |
| March 28, 2009 | Real Salt Lake | Jimmy Gabriel | NASL Sounders player and coach |
| April 11, 2009 | Kansas City Wizards | Robbie Bach | Microsoft executive |
| April 24, 2009 | San José Earthquakes | Jimmy McAlister | NASL Sounders player |
| May 10, 2009 | Los Angeles Galaxy | Meredith Teague | 2009 NCAA Div II soccer National Player of the Year |
| May 31, 2009 | Columbus Crew | Jim Mora | Seahawks head coach |
| June 13, 2009 | San José Earthquakes | Fred Mendoza | Washington State Public Stadium Authority (Qwest Field) chairman |
| June 17, 2009 | D.C. United | Sue Bird & Swin Cash | WNBA Seattle Storm team |
| June 28, 2009 | Colorado Rapids | Lorenzo Romar | UW Men's Basketball coach |
| July 11, 2009 | Houston Dynamo | Doug Andreassen | Washington Youth Soccer President |
| July 18, 2009 | Chelsea | Dale Chihuly | Glass artist, creator of the sculpture presented to friendly opponents |
| July 25, 2009 | Chicago Fire | Mike Ryan | First U.S. women's national soccer team coach |
| August 5, 2009 | FC Barcelona | Bill Russell | NBA Hall of Famer and Seattle resident |
| August 20, 2009 | New England Revolution | John Nordstrom | NASL Sounders co-founder |
| August 29, 2009 | Toronto FC | Michelle Akers | Former US Women's National Team striker |
| September 19, 2009 | Chivas USA | Alan Hinton | Former coach of NASL Sounders |
| October 24, 2009 | FC Dallas | Sounders FC Alliance Council Members | Honoring the Sounders FC fans |
| October 29, 2009 | Houston Dynamo | Chris Henderson | Sounders FC Technical Director |

== 2010 Recipients ==
| Date | Opponent | Recipient | Notes |
|---|---|---|---|
| March 26, 2010 | Philadelphia Union | Cliff McCrath | Seattle Sounders (NASL) scout |
| April 3, 2010 | New York Red Bulls | Tim Murray | Seattle Sounders FC fan |
| April 17, 2010 | Kansas City Wizards | Marian Bowers | Owner and Manager of the Tacoma Stars |
| May 1, 2010 | Columbus Crew | Susan Cole | Seattle Sounders FC fan |
| May 8, 2010 | Los Angeles Galaxy | Linda Velie | Washington Youth Soccer Hall of Famer and first female to referee a US Professional match |
| May 22, 2010 | San Jose Earthquakes | Tim Busch | Seattle Sounders FC fan |
| May 26, 2010 | Boca Juniors | Peter Fewing | Former NASL Sounders player, head coach of Kitsap Pumas |
| June 5, 2010 | New England Revolution | Michelle French | Seattle Sounders Women midfielder |
| July 25, 2010 | Colorado Rapids | Teddy Mitalas | Chairman of Hibernian Saints |
| October 10, 2010 | Chivas USA | Hope Solo | Goalkeeper for the U.S. Women's National Team |

== 2011 Recipients ==
| Date | Opponent | Recipient | Notes |
|---|---|---|---|
| March 15, 2011 | LA Galaxy | Gerard Schwarz | Seattle Symphony conductor |
| May 14, 2011 | Portland Timbers | Jeff Stock & Mark Peterson | Former NASL Sounders players |
| June 11, 2011 | Vancouver Whitecaps FC | Virginia Mason | |
| July 20, 2011 | Manchester United | Bryan Robson | English football manager and former Manchester United player |
| October 15, 2011 | San Jose Earthquakes | Kasey Keller | Retired Seattle Sounders FC goalkeeper |

== 2012 Recipients ==
| Date | Opponent | Recipient | Notes |
|---|---|---|---|
| July 8, 2012 | Chelsea FC | Roger Davies | English footballer, MVP of the North American Soccer League in 1980 |
| October 7, 2012 | Portland Timbers | Roger Levesque | Retired Seattle Sounders FC player |
| October 21, 2012 | FC Dallas | Justice Steven Gonzalez | Associate Justice of the Washington Supreme Court |

== 2013 Recipients ==
| Date | Opponent | Recipient | Notes |
|---|---|---|---|
| May 18, 2013 | FC Dallas | Pat Raney | |
| June 8, 2013 | Vancouver | John Best | Seattle Sounders Head Coach 1974 - 1976 / defender from Liverpool England |
| September 13, 2013 | Real Salt Lake | Brad Owen | 15th lieutenant governor of Washington |
| October 27, 2013 | LA Galaxy | Bob Robertson | Legendary Sportscast Announcer Original Sounders / WSU Cougars |

== 2014 Recipients ==
| Date | Opponent | Recipient | Notes |
|---|---|---|---|
| October 10, 2014 | Vancouver Whitecaps FC | Alan Hudson | English former soccer player, played for the Sounders from 1979-1983 |

== 2015 Recipients ==
| Date | Opponent | Recipient | Notes |
|---|---|---|---|
| June 20, 2015 | San Jose Earthquakes | Jason Collins | |
| August 30, 2015 | Portland Timbers | Megan Rapinoe and Hope Solo | Members of the United States women's national soccer team |

== 2016 Recipients ==
| Date | Opponent | Recipient | Notes |
|---|---|---|---|
| June 26, 2016 | New York City FC | Mayor Ed Murray | Former mayor of Seattle |
| July 31, 2016 | LA Galaxy | Steve Zakuani | Former Sounders midfielder |
| August 21, 2016 | Portland Timbers | Washington Youth Soccer | Washington nonprofit organization bringing soccer opportunities to kids and youth |
| October 23, 2016 | Real Salt Lake | Zach Scott | Retired Seattle Sounders FC defender |

== 2017 Recipients ==
| Date | Opponent | Recipient | Notes |
|---|---|---|---|
| June 4, 2017 | Houston Dynamo | Dr. Stephen Newby | Matchday Anthem Leader/Singer, 2009-2017 |
| August 20, 2017 | Minnesota United FC | Adrian Webster and Davey Butler | Original Sounders 1974-1979 |
| September 27, 2017 | Vancouver Whitecaps FC | Austen Everett | Founder of Austen Everett Foundation, former NCAA Goalie |
| October 15, 2017 | FC Dallas | Dave Gillett | Original Sounder 1975-1980 Defender #17 |

== 2018 Recipients ==
| Date | Opponent | Recipient | Notes |
|---|---|---|---|
| March 31, 2018 | Montreal Impact | Thomas Webb | |
| May 5, 2018 | Columbus Crew SC | Mike McCready | Lead guitarist for Pearl Jam |
| June 23, 2018 | Chicago Fire | Mary Harvey | Former USWNT goalkeeper |
| July 29, 2018 | New York City FC | Andrew Lofton | |
| September 1, 2018 | Sporting Kansas City | Clint Dempsey | Retired Seattle Sounders FC forward 2013-2018 |

== 2019 Recipients ==
| Date | Opponent | Recipient | Notes |
|---|---|---|---|
| March 2, 2019 | FC Cincinnati | Sigi Schmid | Seattle Sounders FC head coach, 2009–2016 |
| June 29, 2019 | Vancouver Whitecaps FC | Chad Marshall | Retired Seattle Sounders FC defender, 2014–2019 |
| July 21, 2019 | Portland Timbers | Lesle Gallimore and Amy Griffin | |
| September 15, 2019 | New York Red Bulls | Joe Roth | Former majority owner of Seattle Sounders FC |
| October 6, 2019 | Minnesota United FC | Brad Evans | Retired Seattle Sounders FC captain |
