= Mike Ryan (soccer coach) =

American soccer coach (1935–2012)

Personal information
- Full name: Michael Patrick Ryan
- Date of birth: 14 February 1935
- Place of birth: Dublin, Ireland
- Date of death: 20 November 2012 (aged 77)
- Place of death: Seattle, Washington, U.S.

Managerial career
- Years: Team
- 1966–1976: Washington Huskies
- 1985: United States (women)

Michael Patrick Ryan (14 February 1935 – 20 November 2012) was an Irish-American soccer coach. He served as the head coach of the Washington Huskies men's team from 1966 to 1976, and later with the United States women's national team for its first international games in Italy in August 1985. He finished his career by coaching at Nathan Hale High School before retiring in 2012 after having coached for over 60 years.

== See also ==
- List of Golden Scarf recipients
