= Parkway North High School =

Public school in Missouri, United States

Location
- 12860 Fee Fee Road; St. Louis, Missouri 63146; United States; 38°41′25″N 90°28′6″W

Information
- Type: Public high school
- Motto: "Head North for Excellence!"
- Established: 1971; 55 years ago
- School district: Parkway School District
- Principal: David Jones
- Teaching staff: 73.32 (FTE)
- Enrollment: 1,013 (2023-2024)
- Student to teacher ratio: 13.82
- Colors: Purple and white
- Athletics conference: Suburban Conference
- Nickname: Vikings
- Website: northhigh.parkwayschools.net

Parkway North High School is a public high school in west St. Louis County, Missouri.

== Building architecture ==
The school extensively used open classrooms, as the school was originally constructed without walls separating classrooms. This was a trend in architecture in 1971 when the building was constructed. However, the infeasibility of this design was discovered ten years later, and plaster walls were inserted between classrooms, resulting in an eclectic mix of architectural styling, as well as the logistical problems with these newly created rooms receiving proper HVAC ventilation. The new science department contains traditional classrooms with walls, moving the school away from its original architecture. The school features a main upper gym on the 1st floor and a smaller gym in the basement. Most of the classrooms are located in the 2nd floor.

== Activities ==
For the 2019–2020 school year, the school offered 27 activities approved by the Missouri State High School Activities Association (MSHSAA): baseball, boys and girls basketball, cheerleading, boys and girls cross country, dance team, football, boys and girls golf, girls lacrosse, music activities, scholar bowl, boys and girls soccer, softball, speech and debate, boys and girls swimming and diving, boys and girls tennis, boys and girls track and field, boys and girls volleyball, water polo, and wrestling.

== Notable alumni ==
- Brad Lander (1987), American politician, New York City Comptroller (2022-), Member of the New York City Council (2010–2021)
- Brad Edelman (1978), former NFL player
- Ruth Harker (1981), soccer player for the U.S. women's national team
- Mary Koboldt (1982), 1988 Olympian, US Field Hockey. 1987 Pan American Field Hockey team
- Randy and Jason Sklar (1990), twin comedians
- Tommie Pierson Jr. (1991), state representative
- Eric Greitens (1992), former governor of Missouri
- Anne Valente (2000), novelist, short story writer
- Metro Boomin, (2012), record producer
- D.J. Johnson (2012), former basketball player for the Kansas State Wildcats
- Sug Sutton, (2016), American basketball player
- Johnathan Edwards (2021), NFL cornerback for the Indianapolis Colts
- John Kelly, sports announcer for St. Louis Blues on Fox Sports Midwest
- Living Things, band
- Steve Savard, voice of the St. Louis Rams, television news anchor and former NFL player
- Daniel Munie, american professional soccer player
