= Ruth Harker =

American soccer player (born 1963)

Personal information
- Full name: Ruth Kay Harker
- Date of birth: June 28, 1963 (age 63)
- Place of birth: St. Louis, Missouri, U.S.
- Height: 5 ft 10 in (1.78 m)
- Position: Goalkeeper

Youth career
- Pattonville Pirates
- –1981: Parkway North Vikings

College career
Years	Team	Apps	(Gls)
1982–1985	UMSL Riverwomen		

Senior career*
Years	Team	Apps	(Gls)
1984–1985	Busch Soccer Dome		

International career
1985	United States	3	(0)
- * Club domestic league appearances and goals

Ruth Kay Harker (born June 28, 1963) is an American former soccer player who played as a goalkeeper, making three appearances for the United States women's national team.

== Career ==
Harker began playing soccer at 14, initially as a midfielder before moving into goal. She was quickly noticed by coaches, earning her overseas training sessions in Sweden in Finland. Harker attended high school at Pattonville and later Parkway North, where she participated in basketball, cross country running, and track and field, in addition to soccer. She played for the UMSL Riverwomenh in college from 1982 to 1985, and was selected in the All-Region team in all four seasons, as well as the All-West first team. She was the team captain as a senior in 1985, and won the team's most valuable player award that season. Harker is the school's all-time leader in shutouts (38), and ranks third in career goals-against average (0.75) and fourth in career saves (255). She also holds the top two records for shutouts in a single season at the school, with 12 in 1982 and 11 in 1985.

After reaching the semi-finals of the USASA National Women's Amateur with the Busch Soccer Dome club team in 1984 and 1985, Harker was invited to the 1985 U.S. Olympic Festival. She was chosen as one of the most valuable players at the Olympic Festival, and was selected to play in the first matches of the United States women's national team. She made her international debut for the U.S. on August 21, 1985, at the Mundialito against Denmark, coming on as a substitute for Kim Wyant. She earned her second cap two days later against England. Her final appearance came August 24 in a rematch against Denmark.

In 2014, Harker's 1981 and 1982 women's soccer teams were inducted into the UMSL Sports Hall of Fame. In 2019, she was inducted into the St. Louis Soccer Hall of Fame. Harker herself was inducted into the UMSL Sports Hall of Fame in 2020.

== Personal life ==
Harker was raised in St. Louis and has been blind in her left eye since birth. She works as the vice president and director of technical support at Swan Packaging in St. Louis, and has two children.

== Career statistics ==
=== International ===
United States
Year	Apps	Goals
1985	3	0
Total	3	0
