= Linda Gancitano =

American soccer player (born 1962)

Personal information
- Full name: Linda R. Gancitano
- Date of birth: January 24, 1962 (age 64)
- Place of birth: Coral Springs, Florida, U.S.
- Height: 5 ft 2 in (1.57 m)
- Position: Defender

Youth career
- –1981: Coral Springs Colts

College career
Years	Team	Apps	(Gls)
1981–1985	UCF Knights		

International career
1985	United States	2	(0)

Managerial career
- St. Thomas Aquinas Raiders

Linda R. Gancitano (born January 24, 1962) is an American former soccer player who played as a defender, making two appearances for the United States women's national team.

== Career ==
In high school, Gancitano played for the Coral Springs Colts boys' soccer team, becoming the first girl to play on the team. In college, Gancitano played for the UCF Knights between 1981 and 1985, red-shirting in her freshman year. At the 1982 NCAA Women's Soccer Tournament, the first edition of the competition, she was chosen as the defensive MVP. She was also included in the NSCAA All-American reserve and NSCAA All-Southeast Region teams in 1981. She was chosen as one of the team's most valuable players in 1981, and won the Coaches' Award of the team in 1984.

Gancitano made her international debut for the United States in the team's inaugural match on August 18, 1985, in the Mundialito against Italy, coming on as a substitute for Denise Bender. She earned her second and final cap on August 24, 1985, in the Mundialito against Denmark.

Her career was cut short after tearing the ACL in her left knee in 1986. She later coached the St. Thomas Aquinas Raiders women's high school soccer team for three years in Fort Lauderdale, Florida.

== Personal life ==
Gancitano teaches at Driftwood Middle School in Hollywood, Florida. She has received recognition as Florida Green School Teacher of the Year, DMS Teacher of the Year, and Broward County Physical Education Teacher of the Year. She started the school's "Green Team" in 2008, and created the "How Low Can You Go?" school-based challenge to reduce energy usage, which was expanded districtwide through a partnership with the Miami Heat. For the project, she was honored by the White House as a Climate Education and Literacy Champion of Change in 2015. She has also coached the school's volleyball team.

== Career statistics ==
=== International ===
United States
Year	Apps	Goals
1985	2	0
Total	2	0
