= Suzy Cobb Germain =

American soccer player (born 1963)

Personal information
- Full name: Suzanne Cobb Germain
- Birth name: Suzanne Cobb
- Date of birth: July 22, 1963 (age 63)
- Place of birth: Virginia, U.S.
- Height: 5 ft 2 in (1.57 m)
- Position: Defender

Youth career
- Langley Saxons

College career
Years	Team	Apps	(Gls)
1981–1984	North Carolina Tar Heels	84	(2)

Senior career*
Years	Team	Apps	(Gls)
- Annandale TBA

International career
1986	United States	1	(0)
- * Club domestic league appearances and goals

Suzanne Cobb Germain (born Suzanne Cobb; July 22, 1963) is an American former soccer player who played as a defender, making one appearance for the United States women's national team.

== Career ==
In high school, Cobb Germain played for the Langley Saxons, before playing for the North Carolina Tar Heels in college. She was named to the All-NCAA Tournament Team in 1983, the team's most valuable player in 1984, and was a first team All-American in 1983 and 1984. In total, she made 84 appearances for the Tar Heels, scoring twice and registering ten assists. In 2006, she was inducted into the Virginia–D.C. Soccer Hall of Fame.

Cobb Germain made her only international appearance for the United States on July 9, 1986, against Canada in a play-off for the 1986 North America Cup title (a friendly tournament). The match, which lasted 30 minutes, was won by the U.S. 3–0 to win the tournament.

== Personal life ==
Cobb Germain was born on July 22, 1963, to Barbara (née Beals) and Douglas Cobb. She married Gregory William Germain on March 11, 1989, in Fairfax County, Virginia. She is the sister-in-law of fellow U.S. international Ann Orrison, who had previously married Gregory's brother Everett in 1986. Cobb Germain, in her only international appearance, had previously played alongside Orrison against Canada.

== Career statistics ==
=== International ===
United States
Year	Apps	Goals
1986	1	0
Total	1	0

== Honors ==
United States

- 1986 North America Cup
