= Emily Pickering =

American soccer player (born 1963)

Emily Jo Pickering
Personal information
- Full name: Emily Jo Harner
- Birth name: Emily Jo Pickering
- Date of birth: February 1, 1963 (age 63)
- Place of birth: Massapequa, New York, U.S.
- Height: 5 ft 5 in (1.65 m)
- Position: Midfielder

College career
| Years | Team | Apps | (Gls) |
| 1981–1984 | North Carolina Tar Heels | | |

International career
| 1985–1992 | United States | 15 | (2) |

Emily Jo Harner (née Pickering; born February 1, 1963) is an American former soccer player, who played on the U.S. women's national soccer team in 1985, the first official U.S women's national team in history. She assisted the first goal for the national team, and scored the second (both against Denmark). Pickering was inducted into the Long Island Soccer Player Hall of Fame in 2015.

== See also ==
- 1985 United States women's national soccer team
