= Lori Sweeney =

American soccer player (born 1964)

Personal information
- Full name: Lori E. Sweeney
- Birth name: Lori E. Bylin
- Date of birth: October 8, 1964 (age 62)
- Place of birth: United States
- Position: Midfielder

College career
| Years | Team | Apps | (Gls) |
| 1983–1984 | Green River Gators | | |
| 1984–198? | Puget Sound Loggers | | |

Senior career*
| Years | Team | Apps | (Gls) |
- Tacoma Cozars

International career
| 1985 | United States | 4 | (0) |
- * Club domestic league appearances and goals

Lori E. Sweeney (née Bylin; born October 8, 1964) is an American former soccer player who made four appearances for the United States women's national team.

== Career ==
Sweeney played for the Green River Gators and Puget Sound Loggers during her college career. She made her international debut for the United States in the team's inaugural match on August 18, 1985 in a friendly match against Italy. In total, she made four appearances for the U.S., earning her final cap on August 24, 1985 in a friendly match against Denmark.

== Personal life ==
Sweeney's daughter Megan also played college soccer, in 2006 and 2008, for the Portland Pilots.

== Career statistics ==
=== International ===
United States
| Year | Apps | Goals |
|---|---|---|
| 1985 | 4 | 0 |
| Total | 4 | 0 |
