= Lori Henry =

American soccer player (born 1966)

Personal information
- Full name: Lori Ann Henry
- Date of birth: March 20, 1966 (age 60)
- Place of birth: Wilmington, North Carolina United States
- Position: Defender

College career
Years	Team	Apps	(Gls)
1986–1989	North Carolina Tar Heels		

International career
1985–1991	United States	40	(3)

Managerial career
- 1988–1993: UNC Greensboro Spartans (assistant)
- 1993–1996: Ohio State Buckeyes
Medal record
FIFA Women's World Cup
Gold medal – first place	1991 China

Lori Ann Henry (born March 20, 1966) is an American retired soccer defender and former member and captain of the United States women's national soccer team. She was the only player from the first match ever played by the national team who made it to the 1991 Women's World Cup Championship in China and one of two players to hit double-figures in caps.

== Early life ==
Henry grew up in the Seattle, Washington area and attended Shorewood High School in Shoreline, Washington where she was a star soccer player for the T-Birds.

=== University of North Carolina ===
Henry attended the University of North Carolina from 1986 to 1989 and helped the Tar Heels to three national women's soccer championships. Henry was twice selected first team All-America. She was also selected to Soccer America's All-Decade Team in 1990.

== Playing career ==
=== International ===
In 1985, Henry was a member of the first women's national soccer team the U.S. fielded. She played for the United States women's national soccer team from 1985 to 1991, including three years as captain. In 1991, she was part of the team that won the first Women's World Cup in China.

== Coaching career ==
Henry began her coaching career as an assistant at UNC-Greensboro and moved in 1993 to become the head women's soccer coach at Ohio State University for four years. She later returned to Shoreline, Washington, and taught physical education at Kellogg Middle School.

== See also ==
- 1985 United States women's national soccer team
