= Sharon McMurtry =

American soccer player and coach (born 1960)

Personal information
- Full name: Sharon F. McMurtry
- Date of birth: October 31, 1960 (age 65)
- Place of birth: Seattle, Washington, U.S.
- Height: 5 ft 9 in (1.75 m)
- Position: Midfielder

Youth career
- Inglemoor Vikings

Senior career*
Years	Team	Apps	(Gls)
- Tacoma Cozars

International career
1985–1986	United States	6	(0)
- * Club domestic league appearances and goals

Sharon F. McMurtry (formerly Remer; born October 31, 1960) is an American retired soccer player and was a member of the United States women's national soccer team from 1985 to 1986. She was the first recipient of the U.S. Soccer Female Athlete of the Year award in 1985.

McMurtry was raised in Bothell, Washington, and attended Inglemoor High School, where she played volleyball and basketball, in addition to soccer on the boys' team. She was also a member of the Tacoma Cozars club team. At Seattle University, she played basketball for the Redhawks, not soccer. After one year of college, she dropped out to pursue a short-lived semi-professional basketball career in the Netherlands. She later played and coached in Australia.

In 2016, McMurtry was included in the Top 50 Women Players ranking by Washington Youth Soccer.

== See also ==
- 1985 United States women's national soccer team
