= Christy Rowe Estlund =

American soccer player (born 1973)

Personal information
- Full name: Christy Rowe Estlund
- Birth name: Christy Lenora Rowe
- Date of birth: July 5, 1973 (age 53)
- Place of birth: Minnesota, U.S.
- Height: 5 ft 4 in (1.63 m)
- Position: Midfielder

Youth career
- Minnesota Thunder Academy
- –1991: Apple Valley Eagles

College career
Years	Team	Apps	(Gls)
1991–1995	Connecticut Huskies		(22)

Senior career*
Years	Team	Apps	(Gls)
1996	Minnesota Lightning		
1998–199?	Tus Niederkirchen		
2000–2001	1. FC Saarbrücken	13	(0)

International career
1996	United States	1	(0)
- * Club domestic league appearances and goals

Christy Rowe Estlund (born Christy Lenora Rowe; July 5, 1973) is an American former soccer player who played as a midfielder, making one appearance for the United States women's national team.

== Career ==
Rowe Estlund played for the Apple Valley Eagles in high school, where she won the Athena Award as a senior in 1991 and was included in the All-State selection in three seasons. She also played for the Minnesota Thunder Academy club team, and participated in track and field, where she was a two-time All-State selection. In college, she played for the Connecticut Huskies from 1991 to 1995, having redshirted during the 1994 season due to a torn ACL. She was an All-American in 1995, and was named to the Big East First-Team All-Conference the same year. She was included in the ISAA National Senior Recognition Team, the NSCAA/Adidas All-Northeast Region, and the NEWISA All-New England selection in 1995. She also received the UConn Club Outstanding Senior Athlete Award in 1996. In total, she scored 22 goals and recorded 26 assists for the Huskies.

Rowe Estlund made her only international appearance for the United States on January 18, 1996 in a friendly match against Ukraine. She came on as a substitute in the 81st minute for Michelle Akers, with the match finishing as a 6–0 win.

In club soccer, Rowe Estlund played for the Minnesota Lightning in 1996. In 1998, she joined German first-division club Tus Niederkirchen in the Frauen-Bundesliga. She later joined fellow Bundesliga club 1. FC Saarbrücken, making 13 appearances for the team in the 2000–01 season.

Rowe Estlund was inducted into the Apple Valley High School Athletic Hall of Fame in 1996. She has coached youth soccer following her playing career.

== Personal life ==
Rowe Estlund is a native of Apple Valley, Minnesota. She was married to Mark Jeffrey Estlund in February 1996.

== Career statistics ==
=== International ===
United States
Year	Apps	Goals
1996	1	0
Total	1	0
