= Tara Buckley O'Sullivan =

American soccer player (born 1962)

Personal information
- Full name: Tara Ann Buckley O'Sullivan
- Birth name: Tara Ann Buckley
- Date of birth: November 1, 1962 (age 63)
- Place of birth: Trumbull, Connecticut, U.S.
- Position: Sweeper

Youth career
- –1980: Trumbull Eagles

College career
Years	Team	Apps	(Gls)
1980–1983	Connecticut Huskies		

International career
1985	United States	1	(0)

Tara Ann Buckley O'Sullivan (née Buckley; born November 1, 1962) is an American former soccer player who played as a sweeper, making one appearance for the United States women's national team.

== Career ==
Buckley O'Sullivan played for the Trumbull Eagles in high school, before attending college at the University of Connecticut, where she played for the Huskies soccer team alongside her twin sister Moira. There she was a letter-winner and team captain during her senior year, becoming the school's only four-time All-American in women's soccer. She was named to the 1982 and 1983 NCAA All-Tournament teams, and was twice was selected as the team's most valuable player in 1982 and 1983. She was also selected in the NSCAA/Adidas All-Northeast Region team in all four seasons, as well as the NEWISA All-New England team from 1981 to 1983. In 1984, she was one of the winners of the UConn Club Outstanding Senior Athlete Award. Her jersey number 5 was the first of two to be retired by the school, making her the only player to wear the number. During halftime of a UConn Huskies football game in 2008, she received a commemorative bowl to honor her contributions to the program. In 2003, Buckley O'Sullivan was inducted into the Connecticut Soccer Hall of Fame, and in 2007 was inducted into the UConn wing of the Fairfield County Sports Hall of Fame.

Buckley O'Sullivan earned her first and only cap for the United States on August 24, 1985, at the Mundialito against Denmark. The match finished as a 1–0 loss.

Buckley O'Sullivan holds a U.S. Soccer National B coaching license, and has held several coaching positions.

== Personal life ==
Buckley O'Sullivan earned her master's in sports marketing from UConn in 1986.

== Career statistics ==
=== International ===
United States
Year	Apps	Goals
1985	1	0
Total	1	0
