= Ann Orrison =

American former soccer player (born 1961)

Personal information
- Full name: Ann Kimberly Orrison-Germain
- Birth name: Ann Kimberly Orrison
- Date of birth: June 29, 1961 (age 65)
- Place of birth: Arlington County, Virginia, U.S.
- Position: Defender

Senior career*
Years	Team	Apps	(Gls)
- Arlington United

International career
1985–1986	United States	5	(0)
- * Club domestic league appearances and goals

Ann Kimberly Orrison-Germain (née Orrison; born June 29, 1961) is an American former soccer player who was a member of the United States women's national soccer team from 1985 to 1986.

She played field hockey and lacrosse at the University of Virginia.

== Personal life ==
Orrison was born in Arlington County, Virginia on June 29, 1961, to Karen (née Olson) and Charles Orrison, and grew up in McLean. She married Everett Grant Germain III on June 21, 1986, in Fairfax, Virginia. She is the sister-in-law of fellow U.S. international Suzy Cobb Germain, who later married Everett's brother Gregory in 1989. Both players had previously featured together in a match against Canada at the 1986 North America Cup, which the Americans won 3–0 (this was Cobb Germain's only international appearance, and Orrison's final match).

== See also ==
- 1985 United States women's national soccer team
