= Cindy Gordon =

American soccer player (born 1962)

Personal information
- Full name: Cynthia Lynn Gordon
- Date of birth: November 14, 1962 (age 63)
- Place of birth: Des Moines, Washington, U.S.
- Positions: Left winger; forward

Youth career
- Mount Rainier Rams

College career
Years	Team	Apps	(Gls)
1981–1984	Western Washington Vikings	?	(50)

International career
1985–1986	United States	6	(0)

Cynthia Lynn Gordon (born November 14, 1962) is an American former soccer player who played as a left winger or forward, making six appearances for the United States women's national team.

== Career ==
Gordon played for the Mount Rainier Rams in high school, before playing for the Western Washington Vikings in college from 1981 to 1984. She scored 50 goals for the team, as was chosen in the NSCAA Second-Team All-West of 1982. She was also included in the NAIA West Region All-Tournament team in 1984, and was chosen as a NCSC All-Star in 1982, 1983, and 1984. She was inducted into the WWU Athletics Hall of Fame in 1999, and was included in the All-Time Washington Women's Roster by Washington Youth Soccer in 2016.

Gordon made her international debut for the United States in the team's inaugural match on August 18, 1985, in a friendly against Italy. In total, she made six appearances for the U.S., earning her final cap on July 9, 1986, in a 1–2 loss against Canada in the 1986 North American Cup. However, the U.S. went on to win a play-off match later that day to win the tournament.

== Personal life ==
Gordon works in the biochemical genetics lab of Seattle Children's Hospital in Seattle, Washington.

== Career statistics ==
=== International ===
United States
Year	Apps	Goals
1985	4	0
1986	2	0
Total	6	0

== Honors ==
United States

- 1986 North American Cup
