= Denise Bender =

American soccer player (born 1959)

Personal information
- Full name: Denise Elizabeth Bender
- Date of birth: July 29, 1959 (age 67)
- Place of birth: Seattle, Washington, U.S.
- Position: Defender

College career
Years	Team	Apps	(Gls)
1977	Washington State Cougars		
1980–1983	Washington Huskies		

International career
1985	United States	4	(0)

Denise Elizabeth Bender (born July 29, 1959) is an American former soccer defender who was a member of the 1985 United States women's national soccer team. She was the first captain of the USWNT in its history and played in its first international game in Italy in August 1985. She played college soccer for Washington State and Washington.

== Personal life ==
Bender was born to Karen (née Byers) and Dean Bender, and has an identical twin sister, Laurie Bender, who also played soccer. Denise Bender earned a master's degree in industrial hygiene and a Bachelor of Science in chemistry from the University of Washington. She worked as an environmental health and safety director at Amgen. Bender married Traci Lyn Brown on February 14, 2013, in King County, Washington.

== Career statistics ==
=== International ===
Nation	Year	International Appearances				
Nation	Year	Apps	Starts	Minutes	Goals	Assists
United States	1985	4	4	330	0	0
Career Total	1	4	4	330	0	0
