= Kim Wyant =

American soccer coach and retired player (born 1964)

Personal information
- Full name: Kimberly Wyant
- Date of birth: February 11, 1964 (age 62)
- Place of birth: Miami, Florida, U.S.
- Height: 5 ft 5 in (1.65 m)
- Position: Goalkeeper

College career
Years	Team	Apps	(Gls)
1982–1985	UCF Knights		

Senior career*
Years	Team	Apps	(Gls)
1994	Orlando Lions	6	
1995–2006	Long Island Lady Riders	99	

International career
1985–1993	United States	9	(0)

Managerial career
- 1995–1998: Florida Atlantic Owls
- 2001–2006: Long Island Lady Riders
- 2012–2015: N.Y.A.C.
- 2015–: NYU Violets
- * Club domestic league appearances and goals

Kimberly Wyant (born February 11, 1964) is an American soccer coach and retired player. She is the head coach of the New York University men's soccer team, currently, the only women to lead a men's NCAA National Collegiate Athletic Association soccer program (Julianne Sitch was at the University of Chicago in 2022). Wyant and Sitch led their respective teams in a landmark game described by The New York Times as "Men vs. Men with Women in Charge.". Since her appointment as coach of NYU, Wyant has led NYU to three NCAA National Soccer Championship Tournaments, 2018, 2021, 2022.

Wyant lead the Long Island Lady Riders to two USL W-League Championships as a player, and also captured a National Championship coaching the NYAC (New York Athletic Club) to the 2014 United States Adult Soccer Association (USASA) Amateur Women's National Championship.

Wyant was the goalkeeper for the first United States women's national soccer team, appearing in the inaugural US game in Italy in 1985. She appeared 12 times for the United States and recorded the team's first shutout and win during a match against Canada in July 1986.

During its first international tournament, the United States women's national soccer team was a hastily collected roster of unknown players. There was little practice time, limited equipment to speak of, and unglamorous travel conditions. The first games consisted of a trip to Jesolo, Italy in August 1985 where the team played four games, losing to Denmark, England, and Italy, and managing a draw in their rejoinder with Denmark. Wyant was called back to the National Team the following summer (1986) for the first Women's International Soccer games (vs Canada) to be played on US land in Blain Minnesota. She was the goalkeeper when the team won its very first game during the initial game of the three-game series. Unfortunately, her national team career was interrupted on July 9, 1986, in just the team's 5th International game, when she tore her ACL in the second half of the match. In an interesting twist, because all of the subs had been used, defender Lori Henry volunteered to play the remaining minutes in goal, thus leaving the US team to play a player down for the rest of the game (loss 1-2). Despite the setback, Wyant made a full recovery and rejoined the team for matches in 1987 and played her final International match vs Canada on August 8, 1993, recording a shutout to secure the CONCACAF Gold medal.

== Playing career ==
In 1982, Wyant was a freshman at the University of Central Florida (UCF) and on the Knights women's team. The team qualified for the first NCAA Women's National Soccer Championship Tournament losing in the finals to the University of North Carolina. Despite her team's loss, she was named the Most Valuable Player of the 1982 NCAA Women's Soccer National Championship tournament. Wyant played soccer for UCF from 1982 to 1985. She was the team's rookie of the year in her freshman year and MVP in her senior year. She was selected as a United Soccer Coaches All American in 1985. In 2010, she was inducted into the UCF Athletic Hall of Fame.

== Professional ==
There was little playing opportunities for women players aside from college but Wyant played in several USASA Women's National Amateur Cup competitions with the Orlando Buddies & Excel teams throughout the late 1980s and '90s. The team's best results were in 1995 with a run all the way to the semi-final match vs the Long Island Lady Riders (0–1 defeat). Ironically, Wyant was 'duel carded' that year, playing with her Orlando Club team in the USASA Cup Competition, thus playing against her Long Island Lady Riders teammates whom she was carded with in the United Soccer League USISLW-League.

in 1994 Wyant joined the Orlando Lions in the very first (unofficial) season for the USISLW-league launched by Franciso Marcos United Soccer Leagues. The league consisted of 12 teams. The USISLW-League extended Wyant's playing career and went on to become the premier playing league for women until the launch of the WUSA professional league in 2002.

In 1995 she joined the Long Island Lady Riders where she spent nine seasons, and played 8,636 career minutes in over 99 games. As a leader in defense on the team, she helped Long Island to the United Soccer Leagues (USL) W-League National Championships in 1995. She suffered a season ending injury during the 1996 season, but returned for the 1997 season fully healthy leading the teams to a second National Championship defeating the Chicago Cobras in a thrilling eight round shootout.

In 1999 the Long Island Lady Riders hosted the Brazilian Women's National Team for an International Friendly as the Brazilians were preparing for the 1999 Women's World Cup upsetting the powerhouse 2–0.

Shortly after announcing her retirement in August 2003, Wyant was named the General Manager for the Lady Riders. Prior to her promotion, Kim implemented the team's very successful camps and youth academy. Under her direction the Lady Riders twice-received the USL W-League ‘Organization of the Year’ awarded annually to the top USL organization displaying excellence both on and off the field. Wyant also served as the team interim coach during the last quarter of the team's 2002 season. In 2004, Wyant was inducted into the United Soccer League's Soccer Hall of Fame., the second female player to be inducted by the United Soccer League.

== Managerial career ==
Kim served as the head coach for Florida Atlantic University's women's soccer team from 1995 through 1998, and Dowling College from 2003 to 2006. She served as head coach of the Women's Premier Soccer League (WPSL) New York Athletic Club from 2012 to 2016. She is currently the men's head coach at New York University(NYU), as well as the head coach of the Brooklyn City F.C. Women's First Team.

In 1998, she served as a Federation International Football Association (FIFA) Staff Coach in Trinidad, where she instructed national team coaches from the Confederation of North, Central American and Caribbean Association Football (CONCACAF) region on the modern demands of goalkeeping.

Wyant is a US Soccer–licensed coach and holds a National Soccer Coaches Association of America (NSCAA) Premier Diploma. She has served as a clinician for many soccer organizations and has published articles in various newsletters and publications.

== Honors ==
- 1982 NCAA National Championship MVP
- 1986 NSCAA First Team All American
- 1995 & 97 USL W League National Champion (Long Island Lady Riders)
- 1995, 96, 97 & 98 USL W League Goalkeeper of the Year
- 1997 USL W League Championship MVP
- 1997, 1998 USL W League All Star
- 1999, 2000 USL Organization of the Year (Long Island Lady Riders)
- 2004 USL Hall of Fame Class
- 2008 National Soccer Hall of Fame, Special Recognition Award
- 2010 UCF Hall of Fame Women's Soccer
- 2013 Long Island Soccer Hall of Fame Class

== See also ==
- 1985 United States women's national soccer team
