= Kathy Ridgewell-Williams =

American soccer player (born 1965)

Personal information
- Full name: Kathleen Ann Ridgewell-Williams
- Birth name: Kathleen Ann Ridgewell
- Date of birth: May 18, 1965 (age 61)
- Place of birth: King County, Washington, U.S.
- Height: 5 ft 3 in (1.60 m)
- Position: Forward

Youth career
- 1979–198?: Enumclaw Hornets
- 198?–1983: Auburn Trojans

College career
| Years | Team | Apps | (Gls) |
| 1985 | Western Washington Vikings | ? | (13) |
| 1987 | California Golden Bears | | |

International career
| 1985–1987 | United States | 3 | (0) |

Kathleen Ann Ridgewell-Williams (née Ridgewell; born May 18, 1965) is an American former soccer player who played as a forward, making three appearances for the United States women's national team.

== Career ==
Ridgewell-Williams attended Enumclaw High School and Auburn Senior High School, where she played soccer. She attended college at Green River Community College for her freshman year. For her sophomore year, she transferred to Western Washington University, where she played soccer for the Vikings in 1985, finishing the season as the team's top scorer with thirteen goals while also registering four assists. She was selected as a NAIA First-Team All-American, and was also included in the NAIA All-District First Team. However, she decided to sit out the following season in order to focus on making the U.S. team at the Olympic Festival. She was also listed on the roster of the Colorado College Tigers from 1986 to 1987. For her senior year, Ridgewell-Williams played for the California Golden Bears in the 1987 season. There she was chosen as an NSCAA Third-Team All-American and was included in the NSCAA All-Region selection. In 2016, she was included in the Top 50 Women Players ranking by Washington Youth Soccer.

Ridgewell-Williams made her international debut for the United States in the team's inaugural match on August 18, 1985 at the Mundialito against Italy. In total, she made three appearances for the U.S., earning her final cap on July 11, 1987 in a friendly match against Norway.

== Personal life ==
Ridgewell-Williams was born to Mary Martha (née Mohr) and Earl Wallace Ridgewell, Sr. She married Timothy James Williams on August 7, 1993, in King County, Washington. She later worked as the director of a soccer club, as well as the general manager of an indoor training facility.

== Career statistics ==
=== International ===
United States
| Year | Apps | Goals |
|---|---|---|
| 1985 | 1 | 0 |
| 1987 | 2 | 0 |
| Total | 3 | 0 |
