= List of international goals scored by Alex Morgan =

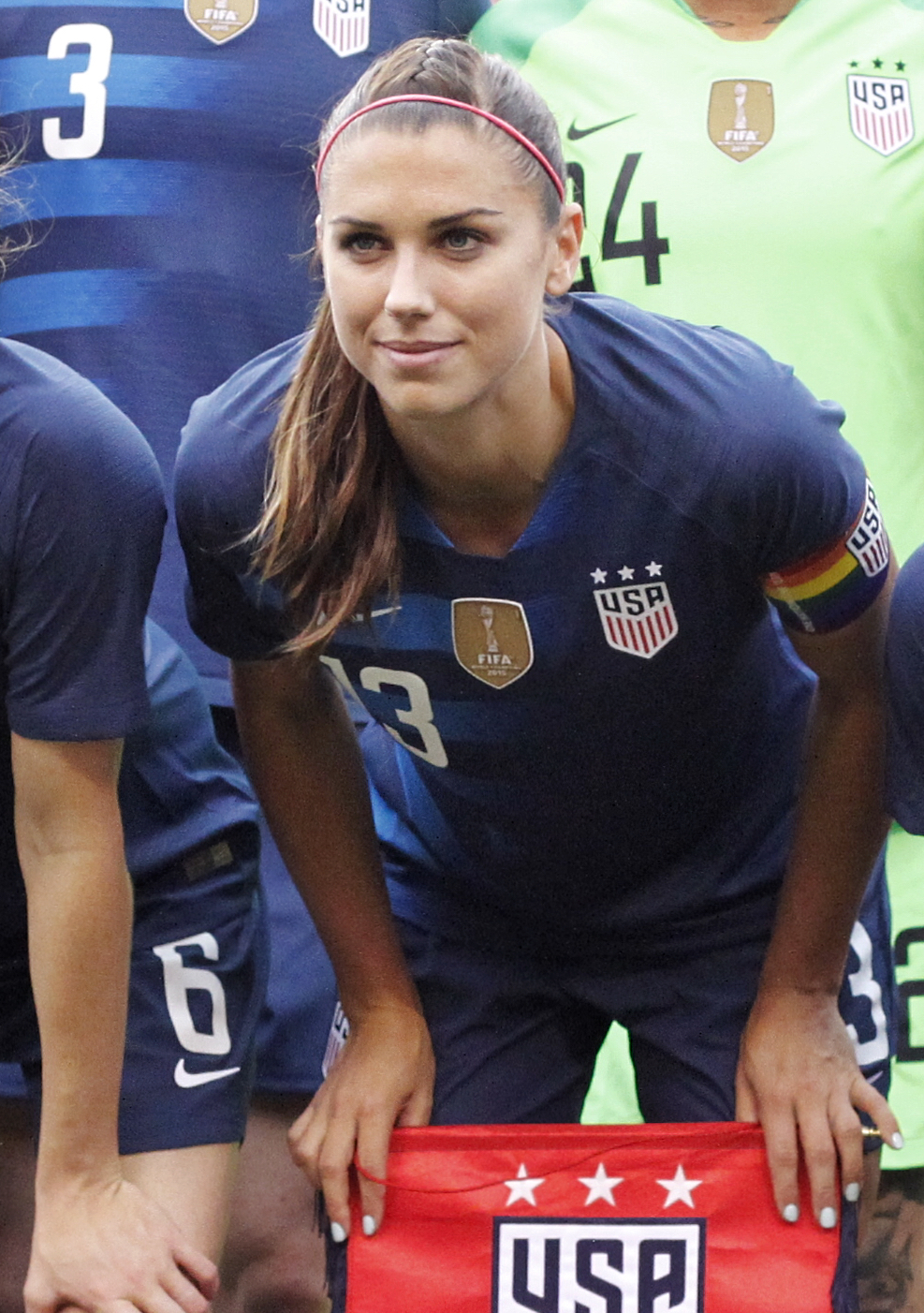
Morgan with USWNT in 2018

Alex Morgan is an American former soccer player who formerly competed as a forward for the United States women's national soccer team from her debut in 2010 until her retirement in 2024. She made her debut appearing as a substitute in a match in the snow versus Mexico on March 31, 2010. In 14 years, she played 220 matches.

Morgan scored her first international goal against China in October 2010. With 123 goals, she is the fifth highest scorer in the national team's history. She is also eighth in all-time top scorers in women's international soccer.

== International goals ==
As of February 23, 2024

Goal	Date	Location	Opponent	Score	Result	Competition	Ref.
1	October 6, 2010	Chester, Pennsylvania, US	China	1–1	1–1	Friendly	
2	October 30, 2010	Cancún, Mexico	Guatemala	7–0	9–0	2010 CONCACAF Women's Gold Cup	
3	November 1, 2010	Cancún, Mexico	Costa Rica	4–0	4–0	2010 CONCACAF Women's Gold Cup	
4	November 20, 2010	Padua, Italy	Italy	1–0	1–0	2011 FIFA Women's World Cup qualifying play-off	
5	March 7, 2011	Quarteira, Portugal	Finland	3–0	4–0	2011 Algarve Cup	
6	March 7, 2011	Quarteira, Portugal	Finland	4–0	4–0	2011 Algarve Cup	
7	March 9, 2011	Faro, Portugal	Iceland	4–2	4–2	2011 Algarve Cup	
8	July 13, 2011	Mönchengladbach, Germany	France	3–1	3–1	2011 FIFA Women's World Cup	
9	July 17, 2011	Frankfurt, Germany	Japan	1–0	2–2 (a.e.t.) (1–3 p)	2011 FIFA Women's World Cup	
10	September 22, 2011	Portland, Oregon, US	Canada	3–0	3–0	Friendly	
11	January 22, 2012	Vancouver, British Columbia, Canada	Guatemala	12–0	13–0	2012 CONCACAF Women's Olympic Qualifying Tournament	
12	January 27, 2012	Vancouver, British Columbia, Canada	Costa Rica	3–0	3–0	2012 CONCACAF Women's Olympic Qualifying Tournament	
13	January 29, 2012	Vancouver, British Columbia, Canada	Canada	1–0	4–0	2012 CONCACAF Women's Olympic Qualifying Tournament	
14	January 29, 2012	Vancouver, British Columbia, Canada	Canada	4–0	4–0	2012 CONCACAF Women's Olympic Qualifying Tournament	
15	February 11, 2012	Frisco, Texas, US	New Zealand	1–1	2–1	Friendly	
16	February 11, 2012	Frisco, Texas, US	New Zealand	2–1	2–1	Friendly	
17	February 29, 2012	Lagos, Portugal	Denmark	1–0	5–0	2012 Algarve Cup	
18	February 29, 2012	Lagos, Portugal	Denmark	4–0	5–0	2012 Algarve Cup	
19	March 7, 2012	Parchal, Portugal	Sweden	1–0	4–0	2012 Algarve Cup	
20	March 7, 2012	Parchal, Portugal	Sweden	2–0	4–0	2012 Algarve Cup	
21	March 7, 2012	Parchal, Portugal	Sweden	4–0	4–0	2012 Algarve Cup	
22	April 1, 2012	Sendai, Japan	Japan	1–1	1–1	2012 Women's Kirin Challenge Cup	
23	May 27, 2012	Chester, Pennsylvania, US	China	1–1	4–1	Friendly	
24	May 27, 2012	Chester, Pennsylvania, US	China	3–1	4–1	Friendly	
25	June 16, 2012	Halmstad, Sweden	Sweden	2–0	3–1	2012 Sweden Invitational	
26	June 18, 2012	Gothenburg, Sweden	Japan	1–0	4–1	2012 Sweden Invitational	
27	June 18, 2012	Gothenburg, Sweden	Japan	3–1	4–1	2012 Sweden Invitational	
28	July 25, 2012	Glasgow, Scotland	France	2–2	4–2	2012 Summer Olympics	
29	July 25, 2012	Glasgow, Scotland	France	4–2	4–2	2012 Summer Olympics	
30	August 6, 2012	Manchester, England	Canada	4–3	4–3 (a.e.t.)	2012 Summer Olympics	
31	September 1, 2012	Rochester, New York, US	Costa Rica	4–0	8–0	Friendly	
32	September 16, 2012	Carson, California, US	Australia	1–1	2–1	Friendly	
33	September 19, 2012	Commerce City, Colorado, US	Australia	2–2	6–2	Friendly	
34	September 19, 2012	Commerce City, Colorado, US	Australia	4–2	6–2	Friendly	
35	November 28, 2012	Portland, Oregon, US	Republic of Ireland	1–0	5–0	Friendly	
36	November 28, 2012	Portland, Oregon, US	Republic of Ireland	2–0	5–0	Friendly	
37	November 28, 2012	Portland, Oregon, US	Republic of Ireland	3–0	5–0	Friendly	
38	December 1, 2012	Glendale, Arizona, US	Republic of Ireland	1–0	2–0	Friendly	
39	March 11, 2013	Lagos, Portugal	Sweden	1–1	1–1	2013 Algarve Cup	
40	March 13, 2013	Faro, Portugal	Germany	1–0	2–0	2013 Algarve Cup	
41	March 13, 2013	Faro, Portugal	Germany	2–0	2–0	2013 Algarve Cup	
42	April 5, 2013	Offenbach am Main, Germany	Germany	3–1	3–3	Friendly	
43	June 2, 2013	Toronto, Ontario, Canada	Canada	1–0	3–0	Friendly	
44	June 2, 2013	Toronto, Ontario, Canada	Canada	2–0	3–0	Friendly	
45	June 19, 2014	Hartford, Connecticut, US	France	1–1	2–2	Friendly	
46	June 19, 2014	Hartford, Connecticut, US	France	2–2	2–2	Friendly	
47	September 13, 2014	Sandy, Utah, US	Mexico	3–0	8–0	Friendly	
48	September 13, 2014	Sandy, Utah, US	Mexico	5–0	8–0	Friendly	
49	September 18, 2014	Rochester, New York, US	Mexico	4–0	4–0	Friendly	
50	February 13, 2015	Milton Keynes, England	England	1–0	1–0	Friendly	
51	March 6, 2015	Santo Antonio, Portugal	Switzerland	2–0	3–0	2015 Algarve Cup	
52	June 22, 2015	Edmonton, Alberta, Canada	Colombia	1–0	2–0	2015 FIFA Women's World Cup	
53	August 19, 2015	Chattanooga, Tennessee, US	Costa Rica	7–2	7–2	Friendly	
54	September 20, 2015	Birmingham, Alabama, US	Haiti	7–0	8–0	Friendly	
55	October 25, 2015	Orlando, Florida, US	Brazil	1–0	3–1	Friendly	
56	December 10, 2015	San Antonio, Texas, US	Trinidad and Tobago	2–0	6–0	Friendly	
57	January 23, 2016	San Diego, California, US	Republic of Ireland	4–0	6–0	Friendly	
58	February 10, 2016	Frisco, Texas, US	Costa Rica	1–0	5–0	2016 CONCACAF Women's Olympic Qualifying Championship	
59	February 10, 2016	Frisco, Texas, US	Costa Rica	4–0	5–0	2016 CONCACAF Women's Olympic Qualifying Championship	
60	February 19, 2016	Houston, Texas, US	Trinidad and Tobago	2–0	5–0	2016 CONCACAF Women's Olympic Qualifying Championship	
61	February 19, 2016	Houston, Texas, US	Trinidad and Tobago	4–0	5–0	2016 CONCACAF Women's Olympic Qualifying Championship	
62	February 19, 2016	Houston, Texas, US	Trinidad and Tobago	5–0	5–0	2016 CONCACAF Women's Olympic Qualifying Championship	
63	March 6, 2016	Nashville, Tennessee, US	France	1–0	1–0	2016 SheBelieves Cup	
64	March 9, 2016	Boca Raton, Florida, US	Germany	1–1	2–1	2016 SheBelieves Cup	
65	June 2, 2016	Denver, Colorado, US	Japan	2–1	3–3	Friendly	
66	June 2, 2016	Denver, Colorado, US	Japan	2–2	3–3	Friendly	
67	June 5, 2016	Cleveland, Ohio, US	Japan	2–0	2–0	Friendly	
68	August 3, 2016	Belo Horizonte, Brazil	New Zealand	2–0	2–0	2016 Summer Olympics	
69	August 12, 2016	Brasília, Brazil	Sweden	1–1	1–1 (a.e.t.) (3–4 p)	2016 Summer Olympics	
70	September 15, 2016	Columbus, Ohio, US	Thailand	8–0	9–0	Friendly	
71	September 15, 2016	Columbus, Ohio, US	Thailand	9–0	9–0	Friendly	
72	November 10, 2016	San Jose, California, US	Romania	6–1	8–1	Friendly	
73	November 10, 2016	San Jose, California, US	Romania	7–1	8–1	Friendly	
74	August 3, 2017	Carson, California, US	Japan	3–0	3–0	2017 Tournament of Nations	
75	September 15, 2017	Denver, Colorado, US	New Zealand	3–1	3–1	Friendly	
76	September 19, 2017	Cincinnati, Ohio, US	New Zealand	3–0	5–0	Friendly	
77	September 19, 2017	Cincinnati, Ohio, US	New Zealand	5–0	5–0	Friendly	
78	October 19, 2017	New Orleans, Louisiana, US	South Korea	2–0	3–1	Friendly	
79	November 9, 2017	Vancouver, British Columbia, Canada	Canada	1–0	1–1	Friendly	
80	November 12, 2017	San Jose, California, US	Canada	2–1	3–1	Friendly	
81	January 21, 2018	San Diego, California, US	Denmark	1–1	5–1	Friendly	
82	April 5, 2018	Jacksonville, Florida, US	Mexico	2–0	4–1	Friendly	
83	April 5, 2018	Jacksonville, Florida, US	Mexico	3–0	4–1	Friendly	
84	April 8, 2018	Houston, Texas, US	Mexico	4–2	6–2	Friendly	
85	April 8, 2018	Houston, Texas, US	Mexico	6–2	6–2	Friendly	
86	June 7, 2018	Sandy, Utah, US	China	1–0	1–0	Friendly	
87	July 26, 2018	Kansas City, Kansas, US	Japan	1–0	4–2	2018 Tournament of Nations	
88	July 26, 2018	Kansas City, Kansas, US	Japan	2–1	4–2	2018 Tournament of Nations	
89	July 26, 2018	Kansas City, Kansas, US	Japan	3–1	4–2	2018 Tournament of Nations	
90	August 2, 2018	Bridgeview, Illinois, US	Brazil	4–1	4–1	2018 Tournament of Nations	
91	October 4, 2018	Cary, North Carolina, US	Mexico	3–0	6–0	2018 CONCACAF Women's Championship	
92	October 4, 2018	Cary, North Carolina, US	Mexico	6–0	6–0	2018 CONCACAF Women's Championship	
93	October 10, 2018	Cary, North Carolina, US	Trinidad and Tobago	1–0	7–0	2018 CONCACAF Women's Championship	
94	October 10, 2018	Cary, North Carolina, US	Trinidad and Tobago	6–0	7–0	2018 CONCACAF Women's Championship	
95	October 14, 2018	Frisco, Texas, US	Jamaica	5–0	6–0	2018 CONCACAF Women's Championship	
96	October 14, 2018	Frisco, Texas, US	Jamaica	6–0	6–0	2018 CONCACAF Women's Championship	
97	October 17, 2018	Frisco, Texas, US	Canada	2–0	2–0	2018 CONCACAF Women's Championship	
98	November 13, 2018	Paisley, Scotland	Scotland	1–0	1–0	Friendly	
99	February 27, 2019	Chester, Pennsylvania, US	Japan	2–1	2–2	Friendly	
100	April 4, 2019	Denver, Colorado, US	Australia	1–0	5–3	Friendly	
101	April 7, 2019	Los Angeles, California, US	Belgium	5–0	6–0	Friendly	
102	June 11, 2019	Reims, France	Thailand	1–0	13–0	2019 FIFA World Cup	
103	June 11, 2019	Reims, France	Thailand	5–0	13–0	2019 FIFA World Cup	
104	June 11, 2019	Reims, France	Thailand	8–0	13–0	2019 FIFA World Cup	
105	June 11, 2019	Reims, France	Thailand	10–0	13–0	2019 FIFA World Cup	
106	June 11, 2019	Reims, France	Thailand	12–0	13–0	2019 FIFA World Cup	
107	July 2, 2019	Décines-Charpieu, France	England	2–1	2–1	2019 FIFA World Cup	
108	February 24, 2021	Orlando, Florida, US	Argentina	5–0	6–0	2021 SheBelieves Cup	
109	April 13, 2021	Le Havre, France	France	2–0	2–0	Friendly	
110	June 13, 2021	Houston, Texas, US	Jamaica	4–0	4–0	Friendly	
111	July 24, 2021	Saitama, Japan	New Zealand	5–1	6–1	2020 Summer Olympics	
112	September 21, 2021	Cincinnati, Ohio, US	Paraguay	3–0	8–0	Friendly	
113	September 21, 2021	Cincinnati, Ohio, US	Paraguay	4–0	8–0	Friendly	
114	September 21, 2021	Cincinnati, Ohio, US	Paraguay	6–0	8–0	Friendly	
115	October 26, 2021	Saint Paul, Minnesota, US	South Korea	3–0	6–0	Friendly	
116	July 4, 2022	San Nicolás de los Garza, Mexico	Haiti	1–0	3–0	2022 CONCACAF W Championship	
117	July 4, 2022	San Nicolás de los Garza, Mexico	Haiti	2–0	3–0	2022 CONCACAF W Championship	
118	July 18, 2022	Guadalupe, Mexico	Canada	1–0	1–0	2022 CONCACAF W Championship	
119	September 3, 2022	Kansas City, Kansas, US	Nigeria	4–0	4–0	Friendly	
120	January 18, 2023	Wellington, New Zealand	New Zealand	2–0	4–0	Friendly	
121	February 22, 2023	Frisco, Texas, US	Brazil	1–0	2–1	2023 SheBelieves Cup	
122	February 20, 2024	Carson, California, US	Dominican Republic	5–0	5–0	2024 CONCACAF W Gold Cup	
123	February 23, 2024	Carson, California, US	Argentina	3–0	4–0	2024 CONCACAF W Gold Cup	

== Statistics ==
As of June 4, 2024

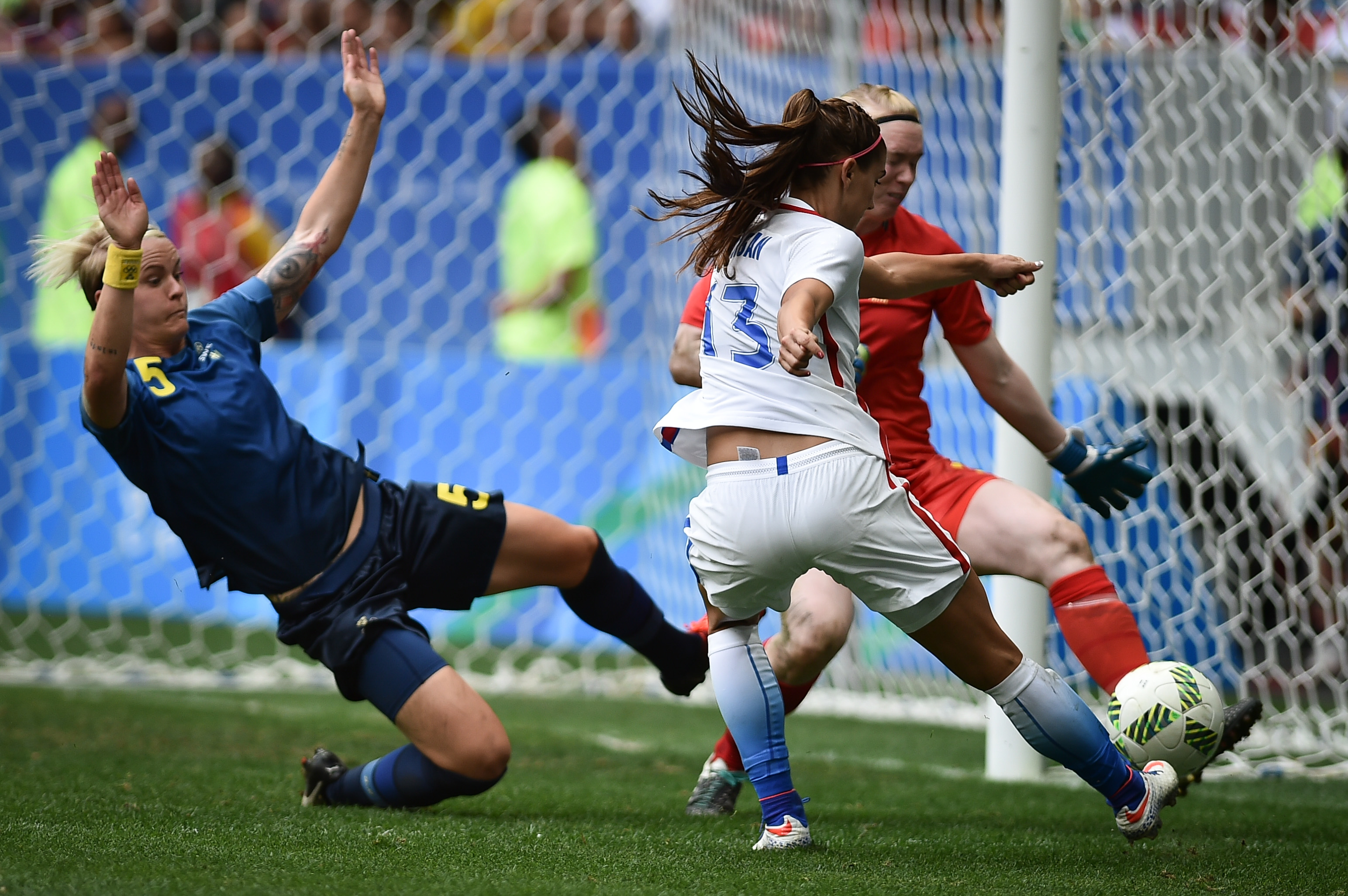
Morgan playing against Sweden at the 2016 Rio Olympics

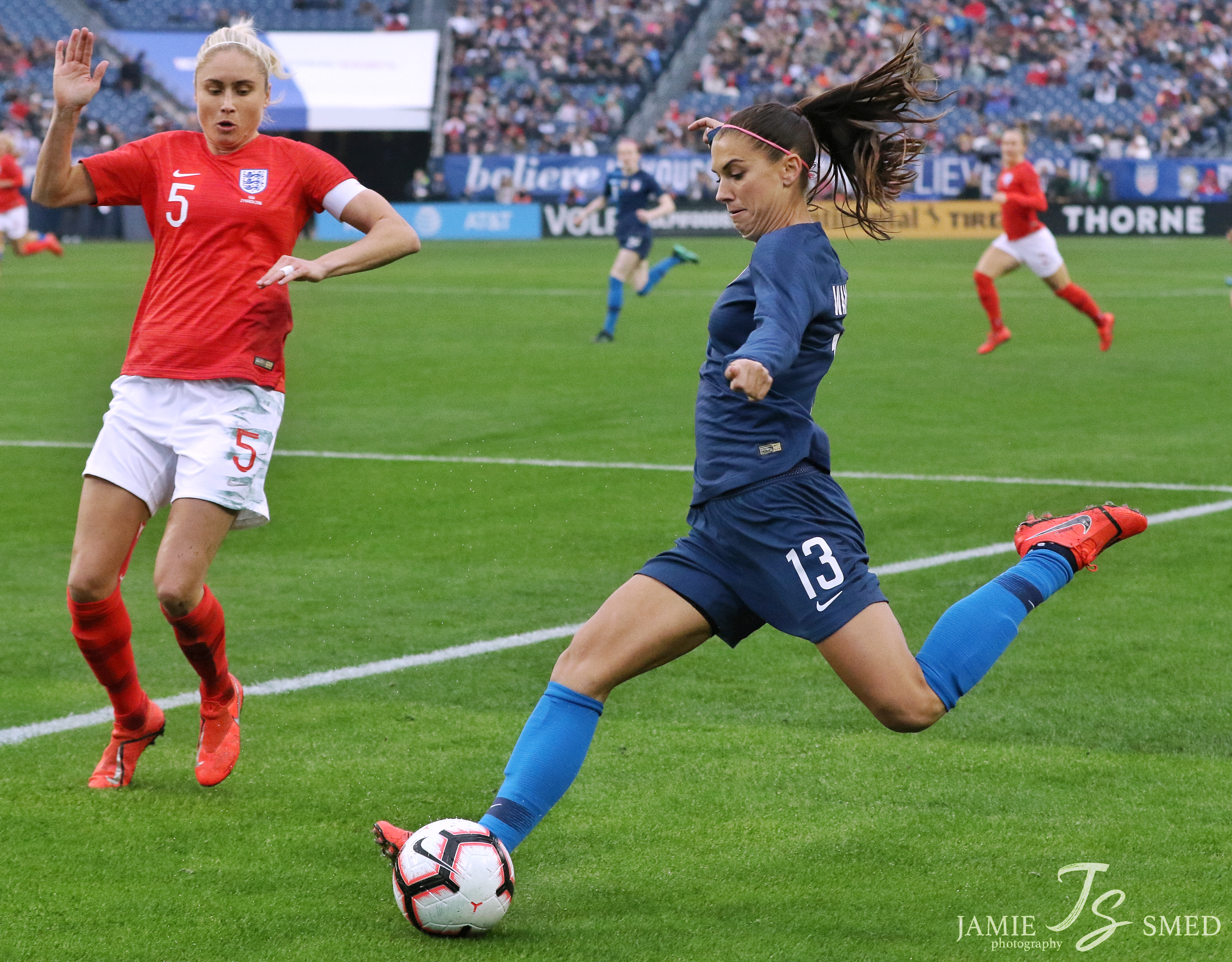
Morgan playing against England, March 2019

=== Goals by year ===
Year	Apps	Goals	Assists
2010	8	4	1
2011	19	6	2
2012	31	28	21
2013	12	6	5
2014	7	5	4
2015	22	7	0
2016	21	17	3
2017	14	7	2
2018	19	18	3
2019	16	9	3
2020	1	0	0
2021	20	8	2
2022	10	4	1
2023	15	2	5
2024	9	2	1
Total	224	123	53

=== Goals by opponent ===
Opponent	Goals
Japan	12
Canada	10
Mexico	9
New Zealand	8
France	7
Thailand	7
Costa Rica	6
Sweden	6
Trinidad and Tobago	6
Republic of Ireland	5
Australia	4
China	4
Germany	4
Brazil	3
Denmark	3
Haiti	3
Jamaica	3
Paraguay	3
Argentina	2
England	2
Finland	2
Guatemala	2
Romania	2
South Korea	2
Belgium	1
Colombia	1
Dominican Republic	1
Iceland	1
Italy	1
Nigeria	1
Scotland	1
Switzerland	1
Total	123

=== Goals by competition ===
Competition	Goals
Friendlies/Invitational tournaments	86
CONCACAF Championship/World Cup qualifiers	12
FIFA World Cup	9
Olympics qualifiers	9
Olympics	6
CONCACAF W Gold Cup	2
World Cup qualification play-off	1
Total	123

== See also ==
- List of women's footballers with 100 or more international goals
- List of women's footballers with 100 or more caps
