= Tournament of Nations =

- Founded: 2017; 9 years ago
- Abolished: May 6, 2021; 4 years ago
- Region: United States
- Teams: 4
- Last champion(s): United States (1st title)
- Most championships: Australia; United States (1 title each)

The Tournament of Nations was a global invitational tournament for national teams in women's soccer in non-World Cup and non-Olympic years hosted by the United States Soccer Federation (USSF) in several American cities. The inaugural tournament was held in 2017.

The 2021 edition would have been a pre-Olympics tournament due to the rescheduling of the Tokyo Olympics. On May 6, 2021, however, the USSF announced that it would no longer hold Tournament of Nations because recent changes in international windows by FIFA made a round-robin tournament unfeasible.

== Format ==
The tournament had been an invitational event, allowing four nations to compete against one another. The tournament was conducted via a round-robin system, with the nation finishing at the top of the table being declared the tournament champions. The format was the same as the other women's invitational event run by the USSF, the SheBelieves Cup.

== Results ==
Year
Year	Winner	Runner-up	Third place	Fourth place
2017	Australia	United States	Japan	Brazil
2018	United States	Australia	Brazil	Japan

== General statistics ==
As of August 2, 2018

Rank	Team	Tourn.	Pld	W	D	L	GF	GA	Dif	Win %	Pts
1	Australia	2	6	5	1	0	17	5	+12	83.33	16
2	United States	2	6	4	1	1	16	8	+8	66.67	13
3	Brazil	2	6	1	1	4	9	19	−10	16.67	4
4	Japan	2	6	0	1	5	6	16	−10	0.00	1

== Top goalscorers ==
As of August 2, 2018

Rank	Name	Total
1	(Australia) Sam Kerr	6
2	(United States) Alex Morgan	5
3	(United States) Megan Rapinoe	3
4	(Australia) Tameka Butt	2
4	(Australia) Lisa De Vanna	2
4	(Australia) Caitlin Foord	2
4	(Brazil) Andressa	2
4	(Brazil) Camila	2
4	(Japan) Yuka Momiki	2
4	(Japan) Mina Tanaka	2
4	(United States) Julie Ertz	2

== See also ==
- FIFA Women's World Cup
- Football at the Summer Olympics (Women's tournament)
- Algarve Cup
- Arnold Clark Cup
- China Cup
- Cup of Nations
- Cyprus Women's Cup
- Four Nations Tournament
- Istria Cup
- Pinatar Cup
- SheBelieves Cup
- Tournament of Nations
- Tournoi de France
- Turkish Women's Cup
- Women's Revelations Cup
- Yongchuan International Tournament
