= Greg Ryan =

American soccer player (born 1957)

Personal information
- Full name: Mark Gregory Ryan
- Date of birth: January 21, 1957 (age 69)
- Place of birth: Frankfurt, West Germany
- Height: 5 ft 9 in (1.75 m)
- Position: Defender

College career
Years	Team	Apps	(Gls)
1975–1978	SMU Mustangs		

Senior career*
Years	Team	Apps	(Gls)
1979	Minnesota Kicks	1	(0)
1979	Tulsa Roughnecks	14	(0)
1979	New York Cosmos	4	(0)
1980–1984	Chicago Sting	51	(2)
1980–1985	Chicago Sting (indoor)	104	(34)

Managerial career
- 1983: Colorado College Tigers (women; asst.)
- 1986–1993: Wisconsin Badgers (women)
- 1996–1998: SMU Mustangs (women)
- 1999–2002: Colorado College Tigers (women)
- 2002–2005: United States (women; asst.)
- 2005–2007: United States (women)
- 2008–2018: Michigan Wolverines (women)
- * Club domestic league appearances and goals

Mark Gregory Ryan (born January 21, 1957) is an American former professional soccer player who played as a defender in the North American Soccer League and Major Indoor Soccer League. He was the head coach of the United States women's national soccer team from 2005 to 2007. He was previously the head coach at University of Wisconsin–Madison, Southern Methodist University, and Colorado College, and was an assistant with the national team.

== Career ==
In 1983, Ryan entered the coaching ranks, while still playing, when he served as an assistant coach with Colorado College men's soccer team. Ryan retired from playing after the first MISL season of the Sting in 1985 and moved to the University of Wisconsin–Madison where he coached in various capacities until 1993. In 1991, he was named the women's college coach of the year. In 1996, he moved to Southern Methodist University where he compiled a 37–21–5 record as the women's soccer coach. In 1999, he moved back to Colorado College.

The national team finished first in first-round group play in the 2007 Women's World Cup held in China. In the quarterfinals, the team defeated England 3–0. Heading into the semifinal match against Brazil, Ryan decided to bench regular goalkeeper Hope Solo in favor of veteran goalkeeper Briana Scurry. The team subsequently lost to Brazil 0–4 (the worst defeat in the team's history) and Ryan received considerable criticism for the sudden lineup change as well as defensive-minded substitutions made when the team arguably needed more offensive players to compete against the Brazilians. On Monday, October 22, 2007, U.S. Soccer President Sunil Gulati announced that Ryan's contract would not be extended past its December 31, 2007, expiration date.

Ryan accepted the position of head coach for the University of Michigan women's soccer team on February 1, 2008. He became the second head coach in the program's 14-year history. After the team posted losing seasons in his first two years at the helm, the Michigan women's team qualified for the NCAA tournament in 2010 but lost in the first round. In 2012, they advanced to the Sweet Sixteen, and in 2013, they made it to the Elite Eight. Through seven seasons at Michigan, Ryan's record is 75–46–23. After the 2018 season, Michigan and Ryan parted ways.

== Coaching record ==
Record table
Season	Team	Overall	Conference	Standing	Postseason
Michigan Wolverines (Big Ten) (2008–2018)
2008–09	Michigan	4–10–5	1–6–3	11th	
2009–10	Michigan	6–9–5	1–4–5	T8th	
2010–11	Michigan	10–5–4	5–3–2	5th	NCAA First Round
2011–12	Michigan	9–8–2	4–6–1	T8th	
2012–13	Michigan	16–5–3	7–2–2	3rd	NCAA Third Round
2013–14	Michigan	18–4–1	9–1–1	2nd	NCAA Quarterfinals
2014–15	Michigan	12–5–3	8–2–3	3rd	
2015–16	Michigan	12–7–2	6–3–2	5th	
2016–17	Michigan	10–5–5	6–3–2	4th	NCAA First Round
2017–18	Michigan	6–6–6	3–5–3	10th	
Michigan:		103–64–36 (.596)	50–35–24 (.569)		
Total:		103–64–36 (.596)			
National champion Postseason invitational champion Conference regular season champion Conference regular season and conference tournament champion Division regular season champion Division regular season and conference tournament champion Conference tournament champion
