= 2018 Tournament of Nations =

International women's football tournament

Tournament details
- Host country: United States
- Dates: July 26 – August 2, 2018
- Teams: 4 (from 3 confederations)
- Venue(s): 3 (in 3 host cities)

Final positions
- Champions: United States (1st title)
- Runners-up: Australia
- Third place: Brazil
- Fourth place: Japan

Tournament statistics
- Matches played: 6
- Goals scored: 22 (3.67 per match)
- Attendance: 93,602 (15,600 per match)
- Top scorer(s): (United States) Alex Morgan (4 goals)

The 2018 Tournament of Nations was the second Tournament of Nations, an international women's football tournament, consisting of a series of friendly games. It was held in the United States, from July 26 to August 2, 2018, and featured the same four teams as the previous tournament.

== Format ==
The tournament featured the national teams of Australia, Brazil, Japan, and the hosts, the United States, competing in a round-robin format, with each team playing every other once. Three points were awarded for a win, one for a draw, and none for a loss.

Country	June 2018 FIFA Ranking	Best World Cup Finish	Best Olympic Games Finish	Best Tournament of Nations Finish
Australia	8	Quarter-finals (2007, 2011, 2015)	Quarter-finals (2004, 2016)	Champions (2017)
Brazil	7	Runners–up (2007)	Runners–up (2004, 2008)	Fourth (2017)
Japan	6	Champions (2011)	Runners–up (2012)	Third (2017)
United States	1	Champions (1991, 1999, 2015)	Champions (1996, 2004, 2008, 2012)	Runners-up (2017)

== Venues ==
Three cities served as the venues for the tournament.

Kansas City	East Hartford	Bridgeview
Children's Mercy Park	Pratt & Whitney Stadium	Toyota Park
Capacity: 18,467	Capacity: 40,642	Capacity: 20,000
2018 Tournament of Nations is located in the United States

== Standings ==
Pos	Team	Pld	W	D	L	GF	GA	GD	Pts
1	United States (C, H)	3	2	1	0	9	4	+5	7
2	Australia	3	2	1	0	6	2	+4	7
3	Brazil	3	1	0	2	4	8	−4	3
4	Japan	3	0	0	3	3	8	−5	0

Rules for classification: 1) Points; 2) Goal difference; 3) Goals scored; 4) Head-to-head; 5) FIFA Ranking
(C) Champions; (H) Hosts

All times are local (CDT in Kansas City and Bridgeview, EDT in East Hartford).

== Matches ==
July 26, 2018
15:15

Brazil	1–3	Australia
Debinha 79'	Report	Poliana 9' (o.g.); Butt 39'; Kerr 50'

Children's Mercy Park, Kansas City, Kansas
Attendance: 10,307
Referee: Christina Unkel (United States)
July 26, 2018
18:00

United States	4–2	Japan
Morgan 18', 26', 56'; Rapinoe 66'	Report	Tanaka 20'; Sakaguchi 76'

Children's Mercy Park, Kansas City, Kansas
Attendance: 18,467
Referee: Carol Anne Chénard (Canada)

July 29, 2018
16:15

Japan	1–2	Brazil
Masuya 90+3'	Report	Marta 76'; Bia Zaneratto 90'

Pratt & Whitney Stadium, East Hartford, Connecticut
Attendance: 13,027
Referee: Katja Koroleva (United States)
July 29, 2018
19:00

United States	1–1	Australia
Horan 90'	Report	Logarzo 22'

Pratt & Whitney Stadium, East Hartford, Connecticut
Attendance: 21,570
Referee: Miriam León (El Salvador)

August 2, 2018
16:45

Australia	2–0	Japan
Kennedy 47'; Kerr 81'	Report

Toyota Park, Bridgeview, Illinois
Attendance: 11,922
Referee: Katja Koroleva (United States)

External videos
- United States Vs Brazil Full match on YouTube

August 2, 2018
19:30

United States	4–1	Brazil
Lavelle 33'; Ertz 53'; Heath 61'; Morgan 77'	Report	Davidson 16' (o.g.)

Toyota Park, Bridgeview, Illinois
Attendance: 18,309
Referee: Quetzalli Alvarado (Mexico)

2018 Tournament of Nations winners

United States
1st title

== Goalscorers ==
There were 22 goals scored in 6 matches, for an average of 3.67 goals per match.

4 goals

- (United States) Alex Morgan

2 goals

- (Australia) Sam Kerr

1 goal

- (Australia) Tameka Butt
- (Australia) Alanna Kennedy
- (Australia) Chloe Logarzo
- (Brazil) Bia Zaneratto
- (Brazil) Debinha
- (Brazil) Marta
- (Japan) Rika Masuya
- (Japan) Moeno Sakaguchi
- (Japan) Mina Tanaka
- (United States) Julie Ertz
- (United States) Tobin Heath
- (United States) Lindsey Horan
- (United States) Rose Lavelle
- (United States) Megan Rapinoe

1 own goal

- (Brazil) Poliana (against Australia)
- (United States) Tierna Davidson (against Brazil)

== Television coverage ==
All three USA games were televised domestically on FS1.

In Australia, all three games featuring the national team were televised live on Fox Sports.

In Brazil, all three games featuring the national team were televised live on SporTV and online at the CBF website.
