= United States women's national soccer team =

United States
- Nickname(s): The Stars and Stripes; USWNT
- Association: United States Soccer Federation (USSF)
- Confederation: CONCACAF
- Sub-confederation: NAFU
- Head coach: Emma Hayes
- Captain: Lindsey Heaps
- Most caps: Kristine Lilly (354)
- Top scorer: Abby Wambach (184)
- FIFA code: USA
First colors	Second colors

FIFA ranking
- Current: 2 (October 20, 2026)
- Highest: 1 (Note: Most recently June 2025)
- Lowest: 5 (June 2024)

First international
- Italy 1–0 United States (Jesolo, Italy; August 18, 1985)

Biggest win
- United States 14–0 Dominican Republic (Vancouver, Canada; January 20, 2012)

Biggest defeat
- Brazil 4–0 United States (Hangzhou, China; September 27, 2007)

World Cup
- Appearances: 9 (first in 1991)
- Best result: Champions (1991, 1999, 2015, 2019)

Olympic Games
- Appearances: 8 (first in 1996 )
- Best result: Gold (1996, 2004, 2008, 2012, 2024)

CONCACAF W Championship
- Appearances: 10 (first in 1991)
- Best result: Champions (1991, 1993, 1994, 2000, 2002, 2006, 2014, 2018, 2022)

CONCACAF W Gold Cup
- Appearances: 1 (first in 2024 )
- Best result: Champions (2024)
Medal record
FIFA Women's World Cup
Gold medal – first place	1991 China	Team
Gold medal – first place	1999 United States	Team
Gold medal – first place	2015 Canada	Team
Gold medal – first place	2019 France	Team
Silver medal – second place	2011 Germany	Team
Bronze medal – third place	1995 Sweden	Team
Bronze medal – third place	2003 United States	Team
Bronze medal – third place	2007 China	Team
Olympic Games
Gold medal – first place	1996 Atlanta	Team
Gold medal – first place	2004 Athens	Team
Gold medal – first place	2008 Beijing	Team
Gold medal – first place	2012 London	Team
Gold medal – first place	2024 Paris	Team
Silver medal – second place	2000 Sydney	Team
Bronze medal – third place	2020 Tokyo	Team
CONCACAF W Championship
Gold medal – first place	1991 Haiti	Team
Gold medal – first place	1993 United States	Team
Gold medal – first place	1994 Canada	Team
Gold medal – first place	2000 United States	Team
Gold medal – first place	2002 Canada / United States	Team
Gold medal – first place	2006 United States	Team
Gold medal – first place	2014 United States	Team
Gold medal – first place	2018 United States	Team
Gold medal – first place	2022 Mexico	Team
Bronze medal – third place	2010 Mexico	Team
CONCACAF W Gold Cup
Gold medal – first place	2024 United States	Team
- Website: ussoccer.com/uswnt

The United States women's national soccer team (USWNT), designated as USA by FIFA, represents the United States in international women's soccer. The team is governed by the United States Soccer Federation and competes in CONCACAF, the FIFA confederation for North America, Central America and the Caribbean. The U.S. team is the most successful team in international women's soccer, winning four Women's World Cup titles (1991, 1999, 2015, and 2019), five Olympic gold medals (1996, 2004, 2008, 2012, and 2024), nine CONCACAF W Championship titles, and one CONCACAF W Gold Cup title. It has medaled in every Women's World Cup and Olympic women's soccer tournament except for the 2016 Olympic tournament and the 2023 Women's World Cup; on both occasions, the U.S. was eliminated by Sweden after a penalty shootout in the first round of the knockout stage.

After mostly being ranked No. 2 from 2003 to 2008 in the FIFA Women's World Rankings, the team was ranked No. 1 continuously from March 2008 to November 2014, the longest consecutive top ranking of any team. Since FIFA rankings were established in 2003, the team has been ranked No. 1 for a total of 13 years; the team with the next-longest tenure, Germany, has been ranked No. 1 for a total of 4 1/2 years. The USWNT has never been ranked lower than fifth in the world.

The team was selected as the U.S. Olympic & Paralympic Committee's Team of the Year in 1997 and 1999, and Sports Illustrated chose the entire team as the 1999 Sportswomen of the Year for its traditional Sportsman of the Year honor. On April 5, 2017, USWNT players and the U.S. Soccer Federation reached a new collective bargaining agreement that would, among other things, lead to a pay increase for players. In February 2022, numerous current and former players of the USWNT settled a lawsuit with U.S. Soccer for $24 million and a requirement that male and female soccer players be paid equally, regardless of the proportion of prize money they receive; this was the first instance of this standard in the world. FIFA still distributes significantly more funds to its member associations for the men's event.

The United States will be a co-host of the 2031 Women's World Cup, and the USWNT will earn automatic entry as a result.

== History ==
=== Origins ===
The passing of Title IX in 1972, which outlawed gender-based discrimination for federally-funded education programs, spurred the creation of women's college soccer teams across the United States at a time when women's soccer was rising in popularity globally. In its first foray into women's international soccer, the U.S. Soccer Federation asked coach Mike Ryan to select a roster of collegiate players to participate in the 1985 Mundialito tournament in Italy. The team played its first match on August 18, 1985, losing 1–0 to Italy, and finished the tournament in fourth place.

University of North Carolina coach Anson Dorrance was hired as the team's first full-time head coach in 1986 with the goal of fielding a competitive women's team at the next Mundialito and at future tournaments. In their first Mundialito under Dorrance, the United States defeated China, Brazil, and Japan before finishing as runners-up to Italy. Dorrance gave national team appearances to teenage players, including future stars Mia Hamm, Julie Foudy, and Kristine Lilly, instead of the college players preferred by the federation. The U.S. played in the 1988 FIFA Women's Invitation Tournament in China, a competition meant to test the feasibility of a regular women's championship. The U.S. lost in the quarterfinals to eventual champions Norway.

=== 1990s: First World Cup and Olympic wins ===
Following the 1988 tournament, FIFA announced plans for a new women's tournament, named the 1st FIFA World Championship for Women's Football for the M&M's Cup until it was retroactively named the "World Cup". The U.S. qualified for the tournament by winning the inaugural CONCACAF Women's Championship, hosted by Haiti in April 1991. The U.S. outscored its opponents 49–0 for the confederation's sole World Cup berth. The team played several exhibition matches against European opponents to prepare for the World Cup; its players quit their regular jobs to train full-time for meager compensation. Dorrance utilized a 4–3–3 formation that was spearheaded by the "Triple-Edged Sword" of forward Michelle Akers and wingers Carin Jennings and April Heinrichs.

At the World Cup, the U.S. won all three of its group stage matches and outscored its opponents 11–2. The Americans achieved a 7–0 victory in the quarterfinals over Chinese Taipei, fueled by a five-goal performance by Akers in the first 50 minutes of the match. In the semifinal against Germany, Jennings scored a hat-trick in the first half as the U.S. won 5–2. The team's lopsided victories in the earlier rounds had brought attention from American media outlets, but the final match was not televised live in the U.S. The United States won the inaugural Women's World Cup title by defeating Norway 2–1 in the final, played in front of 65,000 spectators at Tianhe Stadium in Guangzhou. Both goals were scored by Akers, who finished as the top goalscorer of the tournament, with ten goals. Jennings was awarded the Golden Ball as the tournament's best player.

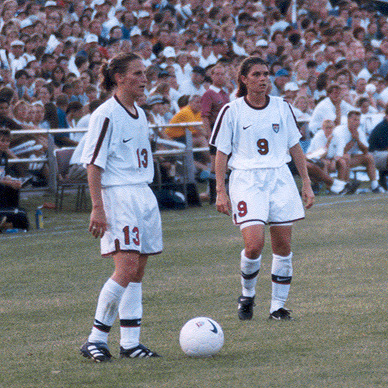
Kristine Lilly (left) and Mia Hamm

Despite its World Cup victory, the U.S. team remained in relative obscurity and received only a small welcome from several U.S. Soccer Federation officials upon arrival at John F. Kennedy International Airport in New York City. The team was given fewer resources and little attention as the federation focused on improving the men's national team in preparation for the 1994 men's World Cup that would be hosted in the United States. The women's team was placed on hiatus after the 1991 World Cup, only playing twice in 1992. They returned the following year to play in several tournaments hosted in Cyprus, Canada, and the United States, and won a second CONCACAF Championship title.

The U.S. played in several tournaments to prepare for the 1995 FIFA Women's World Cup and its qualification campaign. The first was the inaugural Algarve Cup in Portugal, which saw the team lose 1–0 to Norway in the final. The Algarve Cup was followed by a victory at the Chiquita Cup, an exhibition tournament hosted on the U.S. East Coast against Germany, China, and Norway. Dorrance resigned from his position as head coach in August 1994 and was replaced by his assistant, Tony DiCicco, a former professional goalkeeper who played in the American Soccer League. Under DiCicco, the USWNT secured a berth at the 1995 World Cup by winning the 1994 CONCACAF Championship, during which they scored 36 goals and conceded only one.

In February 1995, the U.S. women's program opened a permanent training and treatment facility in Sanford, Florida, and began a series of warm-up friendlies that were paid for by Nike. The team topped their group in the Women's World Cup, despite a 3–3 tie with China in the opening match and losing goalkeeper Briana Scurry to a red card in their second match. The U.S. proceeded to defeat Japan 4–0 in the quarterfinals, then lost 1–0 to Norway in the semifinals. The team finished in third place by achieving a 2–0 victory over China. At the inaugural Olympic women's soccer tournament during the 1996 Summer Olympics, the U.S. won the gold medal, defeating China 2–1 in the final.

On July 10, 1999, a stadium of 90,000 people—the largest-ever audience for a women's sporting event at the time—watched the United States play China in the final of the 1999 World Cup in Pasadena, California. After a back-and-forth game, the score was tied 0–0 at full-time, and remained so after extra time, leading to a penalty shootout. Brandi Chastain scored the final kick for the United States, winning the game and the World Cup. She dropped to her knees, whipped off her jersey, and celebrated in her sports bra, an image which made the cover of Sports Illustrated and the front pages of newspapers around the world. The U.S. victory brought significant media attention to women's soccer and women's sports in general, and inspired many girls to play soccer. In the 2000 Summer Olympics, the USWNT were close to defending their gold medal but were controversially defeated by Norway in the final with a golden goal in extra time, which involved an alleged handball in the lead-up.

=== 2000s: two Olympic gold medals ===
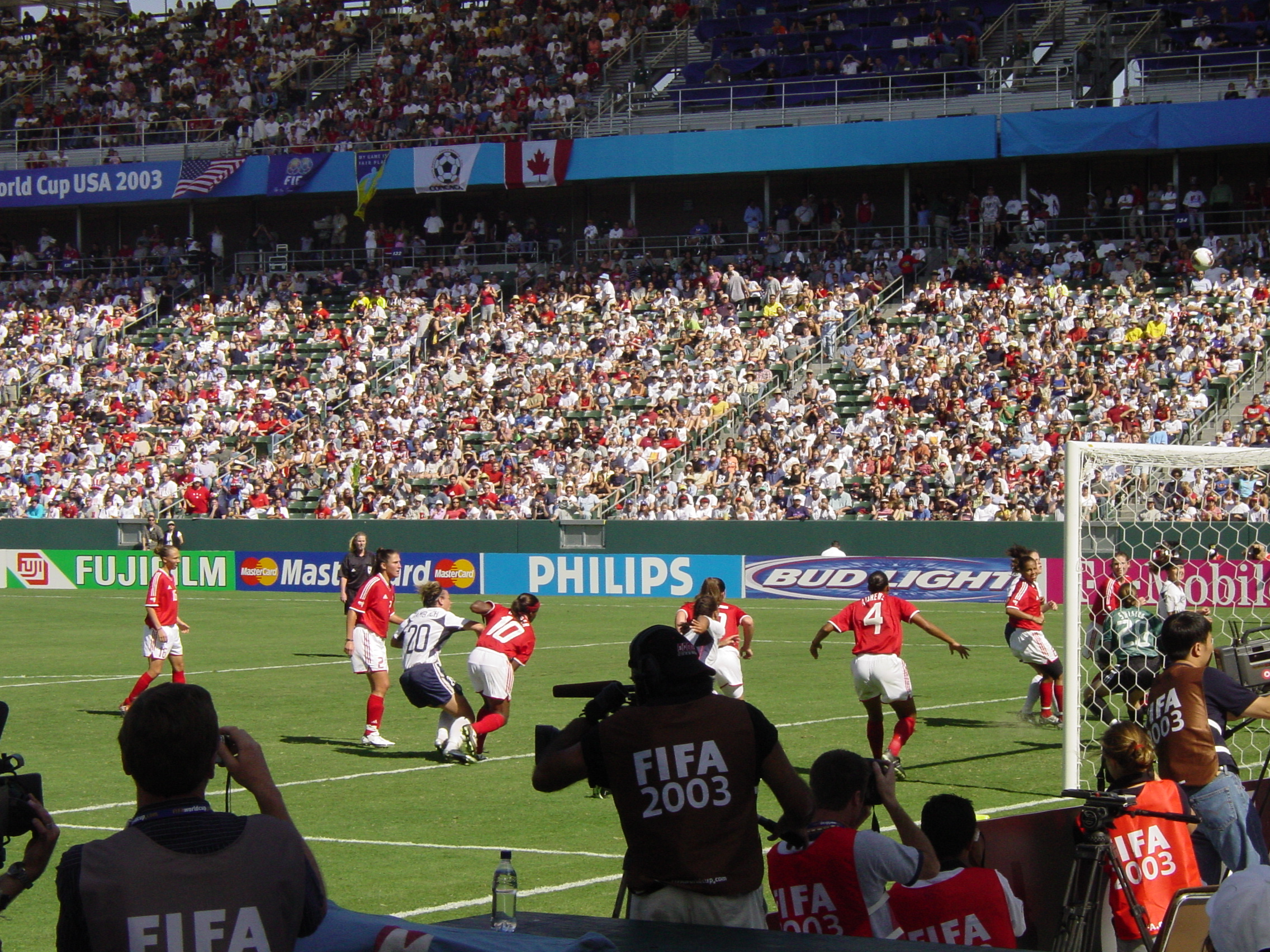
Abby Wambach plays off a corner kick at the 2003 FIFA Women's World Cup bronze medal game against Canada

In the 2003 FIFA Women's World Cup, the U.S. defeated Norway 1–0 in the quarterfinals but lost 3–0 to Germany in the semifinals. The team then defeated Canada 3–1 to claim third place. Abby Wambach was the team's top scorer with three goals, while Joy Fawcett and Shannon Boxx made the tournament's all-star team. In the 2004 Olympics, the last major international tournament for Hamm and Foudy, the U.S. earned the gold medal, winning 2–1 over Brazil in the final on an extra time goal by Wambach.

At the 2007 FIFA Women's World Cup, the U.S. defeated England 3–0 in the quarterfinals but then suffered its most lopsided loss in team history when it lost to Brazil 4–0 in the semifinals. The U.S. recovered to defeat Norway to take third place. Wambach was the team's leading scorer with 6 goals, and Lilly was the only American named to the tournament's all-star team.

The team won another gold medal in the 2008 Olympics, but interest in the Women's National Team had diminished since their performance in the 1999 World Cup. However, the second women's professional league was created in March 2009, Women's Professional Soccer.

=== 2010s: Olympic and then World Cup triumphs ===
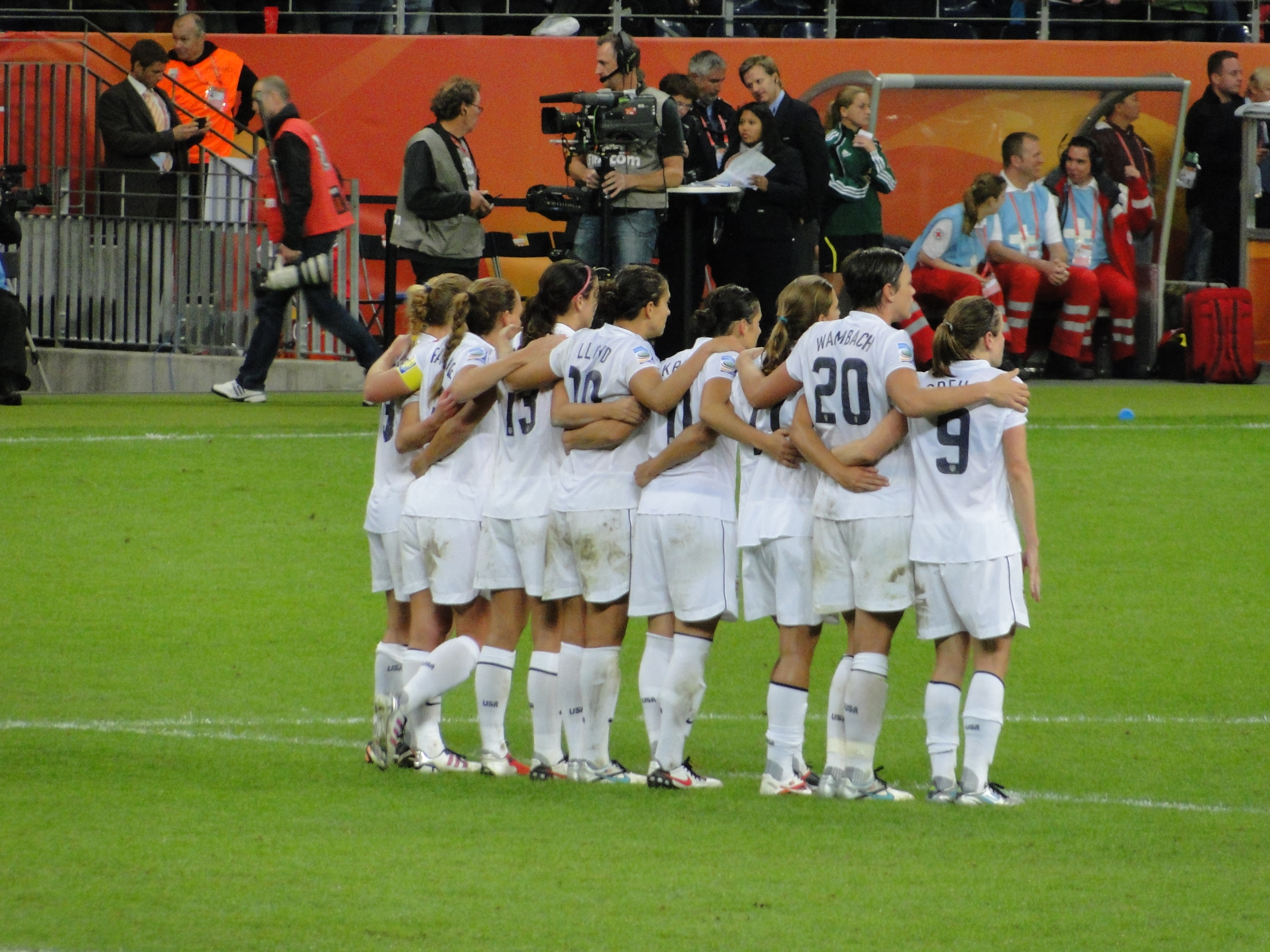
The USWNT at the 2011 FIFA Women's World Cup

In the quarterfinal of the 2011 Women's World Cup in Germany, the U.S. defeated Brazil 5–3 on penalty kicks. Wambach's goal in the 122nd minute to tie the game 2–2 has been voted the greatest goal in U.S. soccer history and the greatest goal in Women's World Cup history. The U.S. then beat France 3–1 in the semifinal, but lost to Japan 3–1 on penalty kicks in the Final after drawing 1–1 in regulation and 2–2 in overtime. Hope Solo was named the tournament's best goalkeeper and Wambach won the silver ball as the tournament's second-best player.

In the 2012 Summer Olympics, the U.S. won the gold medal for the fourth time in five Olympics by defeating Japan 2–1 in front of 80,203 fans at Wembley Stadium, a record for a women's soccer game at the Olympics. The United States advanced to face Japan for the gold medal by winning the semifinal against Canada, a 4–3 victory at the end of extra time. The 2012 London Olympics marked the first time the USWNT won every game en route to the gold medal and set an Olympic women's team record of 16 goals scored.

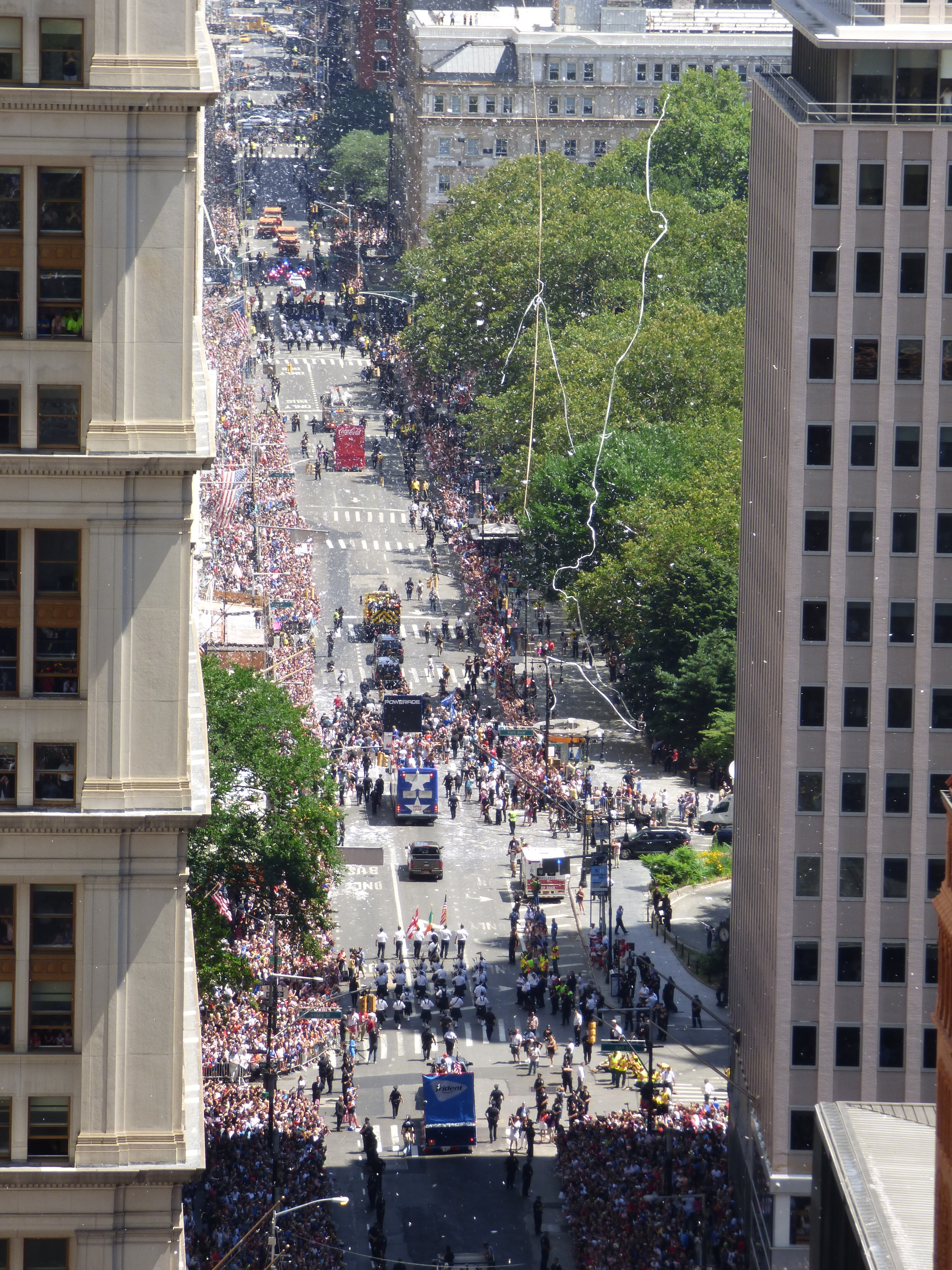
A ticker tape parade in Manhattan celebrating the team's 2015 World Cup victory

The National Women's Soccer League started in 2013, and provided competitive games as well as opportunities to players on the fringes of the squad. The U.S. had a 43-game unbeaten streak that spanned two years – the streak began with a 4–0 win over Sweden in the 2012 Algarve Cup, and came to an end after a 1–0 loss against Sweden in the 2014 Algarve Cup.

The U.S. defeated Japan 5–2 in the final of the 2015 World Cup, becoming the first team in history to win three Women's World Cup titles. In the 16th minute, Carli Lloyd achieved the fastest hat-trick from kick-off in World Cup history, and Wambach was greeted with a standing ovation for her last World Cup match. Following their 2015 World Cup win, the team was honored with a ticker tape parade in New York City, the first for a women's sports team, and honored by President Barack Obama at the White House. On December 16, 2015, however, a 1–0 loss to China in Wambach's last game meant the team's first home loss since 2004, ending their 104-game home unbeaten streak.

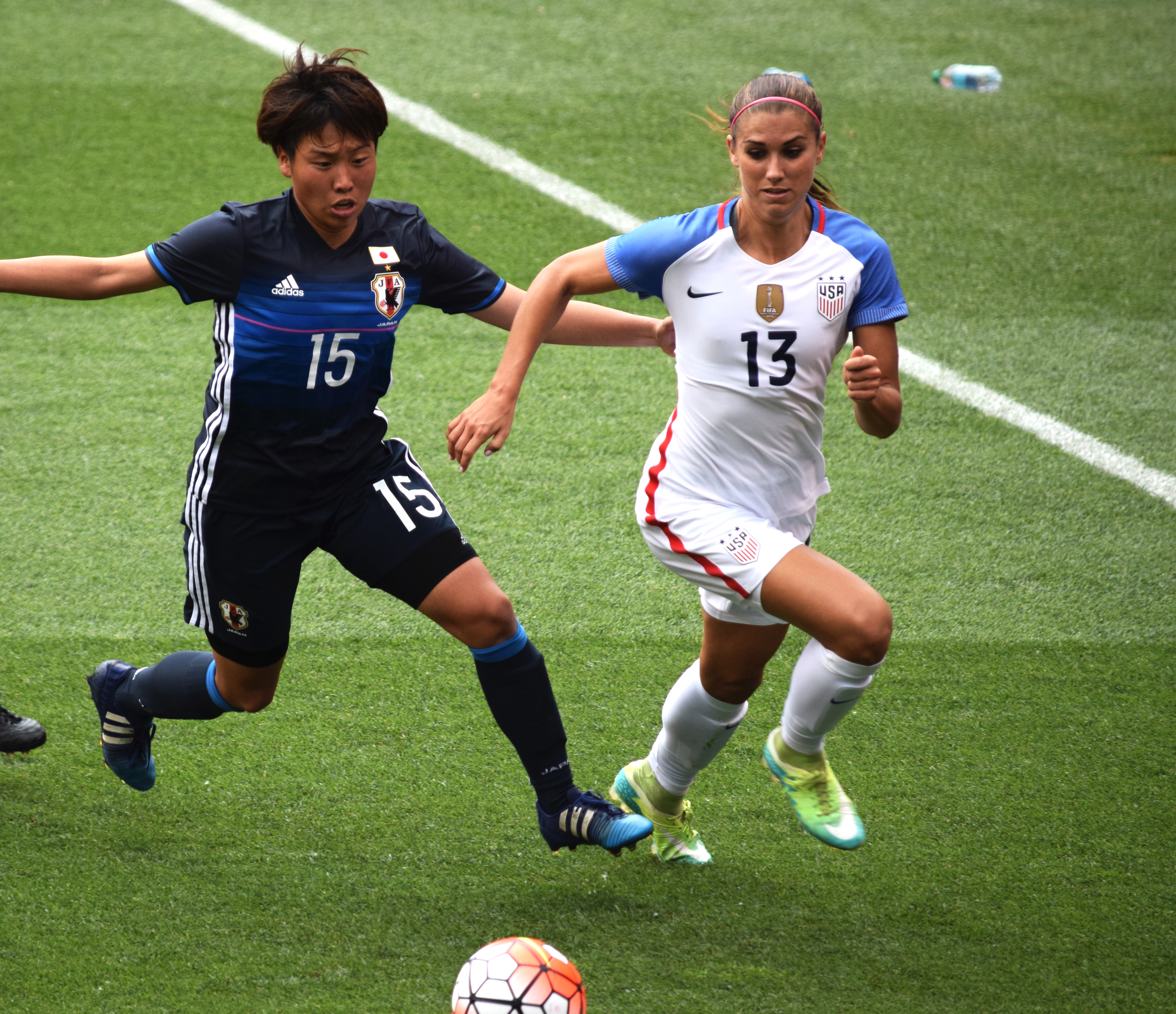
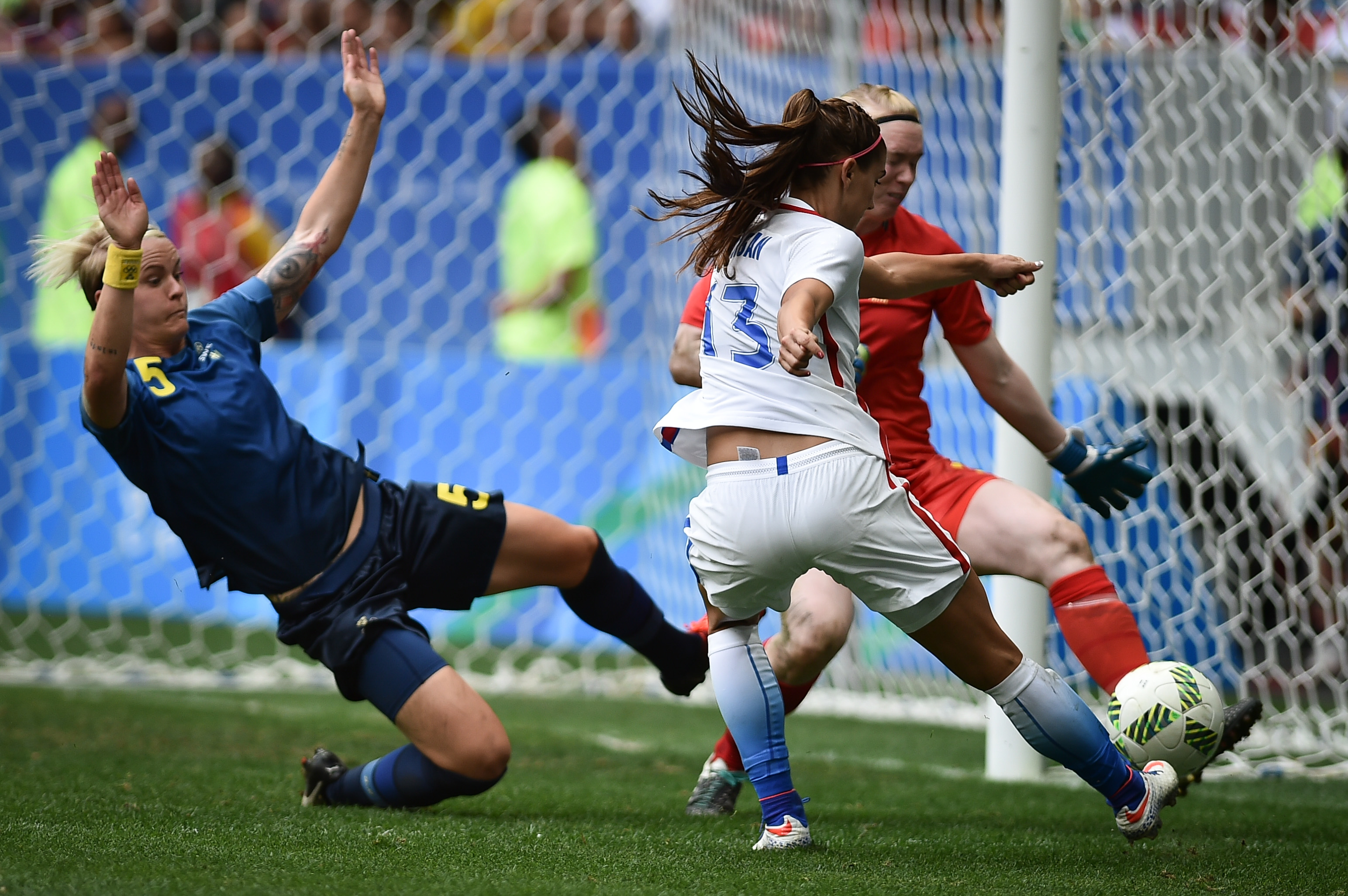
Alex Morgan being challenged by Hikari Takagi (15) during a match against Japan in Cleveland on June 5, 2016, and again, being challenged by Nilla Fischer (5) during a match against Sweden in Brasília on August 12, 2016.

In the 2016 Summer Olympics, the U.S. drew against Sweden in the quarterfinal; in the following penalty kick phase, Sweden won the game 4–3. The loss marked the first time that the USWNT did not advance to the gold medal game of the Olympics, and the first time that the USWNT failed to advance to the semifinal round of a major tournament.

After the defeat in the 2016 Olympics, the USWNT underwent a year of experimentation which saw them losing three home games. If not for a comeback win against Brazil, the USWNT was on the brink of losing four home games in one year, a low never before seen by the USWNT. 2017 saw the USWNT play 12 games against teams ranked in the top-15 in the world.

Throughout 2018, the U.S. would pick up two major tournament wins, winning both the SheBelieves Cup and the Tournament of Nations. The team would enter qualifying for the 2019 FIFA Women's World Cup on a 21-game unbeaten streak and dominated the competition, winning all five of its games and the tournament whilst qualifying for the World Cup as well as scoring 18 goals and conceding none. On March 7, 2018, Alyssa Alhadeff, the captain of the Parkland Soccer Club, who was killed by gunman Nikolas Cruz in the Parkland High School shooting nearly three weeks earlier, was honored by the U.S. prior to a game against England in Orlando during the 2018 SheBelieves Cup. Alhadeff's teammates and family were invited to the game and presented with official jerseys that featured her name. The U.S. won the game 1–0, winning its second SheBelieves Cup title in three years. On November 8, 2018, the U.S. earned their 500th victory in team history after a 1–0 victory over Portugal. The start of 2019 saw the U.S. lose an away game to France, 3–1, marking the end of a 28-game unbeaten streak and their first loss since a 1–0 defeat to Australia in July 2017.

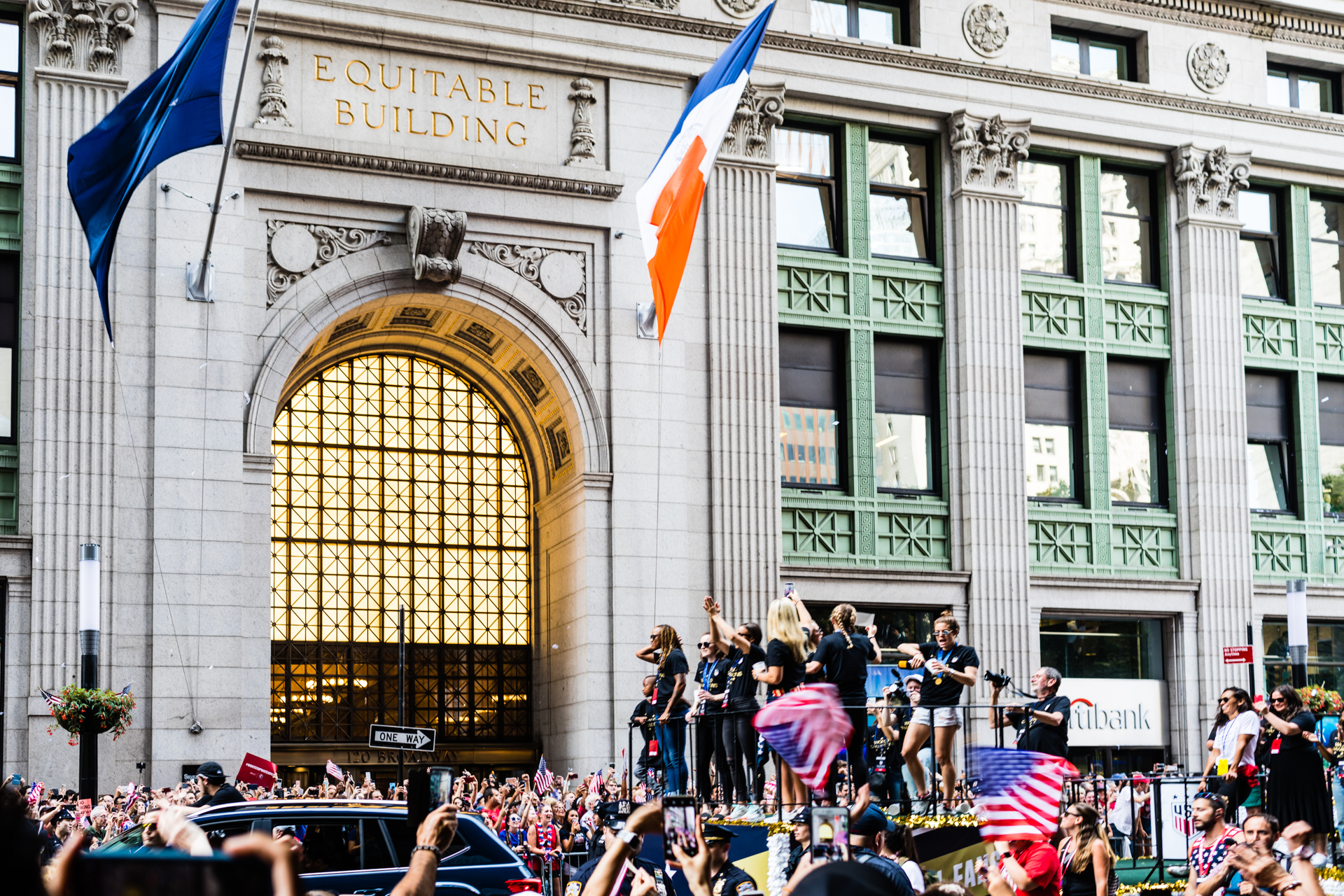
USWNT at a parade in their honor after the 2019 Championship

The USWNT started off their 2019 FIFA Women's World Cup campaign with a 13–0 victory against Thailand, setting a new Women's World Cup goal record. Alex Morgan equaled Akers' record of scoring five goals in a single World Cup match, while four of her teammates scored their first World Cup goals in their debut at the tournament. The U.S. would win its next match against Chile 3–0 before concluding the group stage with a win of 2–0 over Sweden. The team emerged as the winners of Group F and would go on to face Spain in the Round of 16, whom they would defeat 2–1 thanks to a pair of Megan Rapinoe penalties. The team would achieve identical results in their next two games. With 2–1 victories over France and then England seeing them advance to a record third straight World Cup final, they played against the Netherlands for the title. They beat the Netherlands 2–0 in the final on July 7, 2019, becoming the first team in history to win four Women's World Cup titles.

On July 30, 2019, Jill Ellis announced that she would step down as head coach following the conclusion of the team's post-World Cup victory tour on October 6, 2019.

Vlatko Andonovski was hired as head coach of the USWNT in October 2019, replacing Ellis.

=== 2020s: fifth Olympic gold ===
The USWNT began the new decade by winning both the 2020 CONCACAF Women's Olympic Qualifying tournament (which qualified the team for the 2020 Summer Olympics) and the 2020 SheBelieves Cup titles.

In early March 2020, due to the COVID-19 pandemic, the USSF canceled previously scheduled USWNT friendlies against Australia and Brazil. Later that same month, it was announced by the International Olympic Committee (IOC) and the Tokyo Metropolitan Government that the 2020 Summer Olympics were to be postponed until July 2021. The USWNT played their first game in eight months on November 27, 2020, when they took on the Netherlands in a friendly match. Rose Lavelle and Kristie Mewis scored, the team winning the game 2–0.

On July 21, 2021, the USWNT lost 3–0 against Sweden in the opening round of group stage at the 2020 Summer Olympics, thus ending a 44-match unbeaten streak. The U.S. rebounded by winning their 2nd match against New Zealand, before concluding the group stage by drawing 0–0 with Australia. The team finished second in the group stage and qualified for the knockout stage. They first faced World Cup runners-up Netherlands, with whom they drew 2–2 after extra-time before winning the match in a penalty shootout. The USWNT advanced to the semifinals, where they faced Canada. However, the team lost to Canada 1–0 by a penalty scored by Jessie Fleming. They later faced Australia again in the bronze medal match in a rematch of their final group stage game. The U.S. won 4–3, making it the first time the team had won the bronze medal.

In July 2022, the team competed in the CONCACAF W Championship. The USWNT won its group, outscoring opponents 9–0 in the group stage, and then won the semifinal 3–0 against Costa Rica and the final 1–0 against Canada. It was their ninth CONCACAF championship title and earned automatic berths for the 2023 World Cup, the 2024 Summer Olympics in France, and the 2024 CONCACAF W Gold Cup.

In November 2022, the USWNT's 71-game home unbeaten streak ended, after a 2–1 defeat in an exhibition game against Germany.

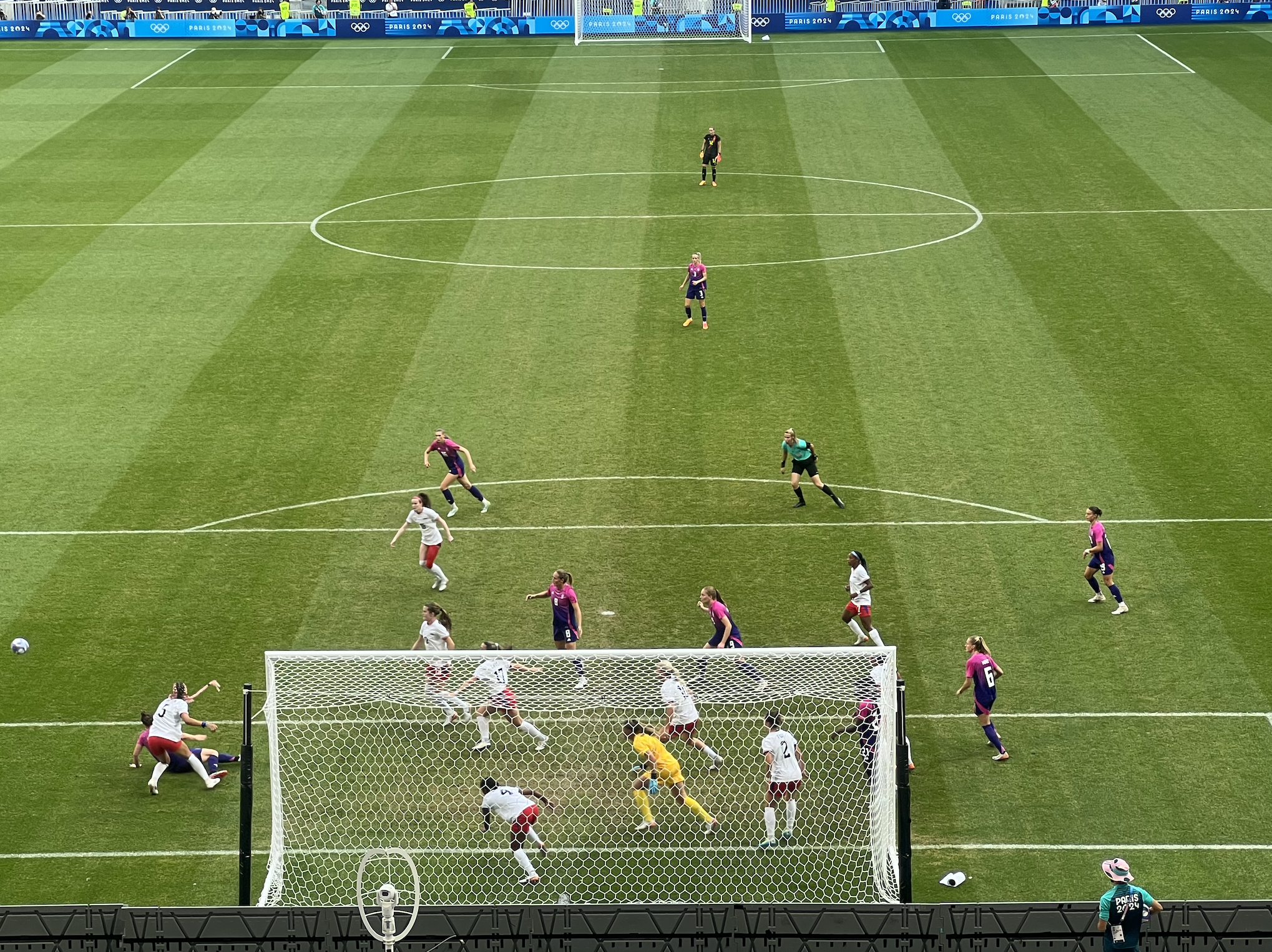
Chaos in the USWNT's defense at the 2024 Olympics.

At the 2023 FIFA Women's World Cup, the USWNT were in Group E along with Netherlands, Portugal and Vietnam. They had gone in hoping to be the first men's or women's team to pull off a three-peat at the World Cup. The USWNT opened with a 3–0 win over Vietnam, followed this up with a 1–1 draw against Netherlands and finished up with a 0–0 draw against Portugal, to finish second in the group, avoiding elimination after a shot from Portugal struck the goalpost in injury time. This marked the fewest points the team has ever gained in a group stage (they won at least two group games in every other tournament including 1991 when only two points were awarded for a win) and set them up for a round of 16 match against Sweden, where they played out a goalless draw and lost 5–4 after a penalty shootout. This marked the first time since the 2016 Summer Olympics that the United States did not reach the semifinals of a major tournament. It also marked the first Women's World Cup the United States would not finish in the Top 3, and their earliest elimination in either the Women's World Cup or the Olympics. On August 17, 2023, Andonovski resigned as head coach and Twila Kilgore became the interim head coach. That August the team dropped to third in the FIFA Women's World Ranking, their worst ever position.

The USWNT qualified for the 2024 Summer Olympics by winning the 2022 CONCACAF W Championship. This would be the first tournament since the 2008 Summer Olympics to not feature Alex Morgan as she was not selected for the roster.

They were placed in Group B with Zambia, Germany, and Australia. They won all three group-stage games by scores of 3–0, 4–1, and 2–1, respectively. In the knockout rounds, they defeated Japan 1–0 in extra time and then Germany in the semifinal, also 1–0 in extra time. Commentators expressed concern that because of the two extra-time games in a tournament with a compressed schedule, the USWNT would be more fatigued than their opponent in the final, Brazil, who had beaten both of their knockout-round opponents in regulation time. However, they prevailed 1–0 in the final to win the gold medal, their first since 2012 and fifth overall. Ten of their twelve goals in the tournament were scored by the self-named "Triple Espresso" attackers Trinity Rodman, Mallory Swanson, and Sophia Smith.

== Team image ==
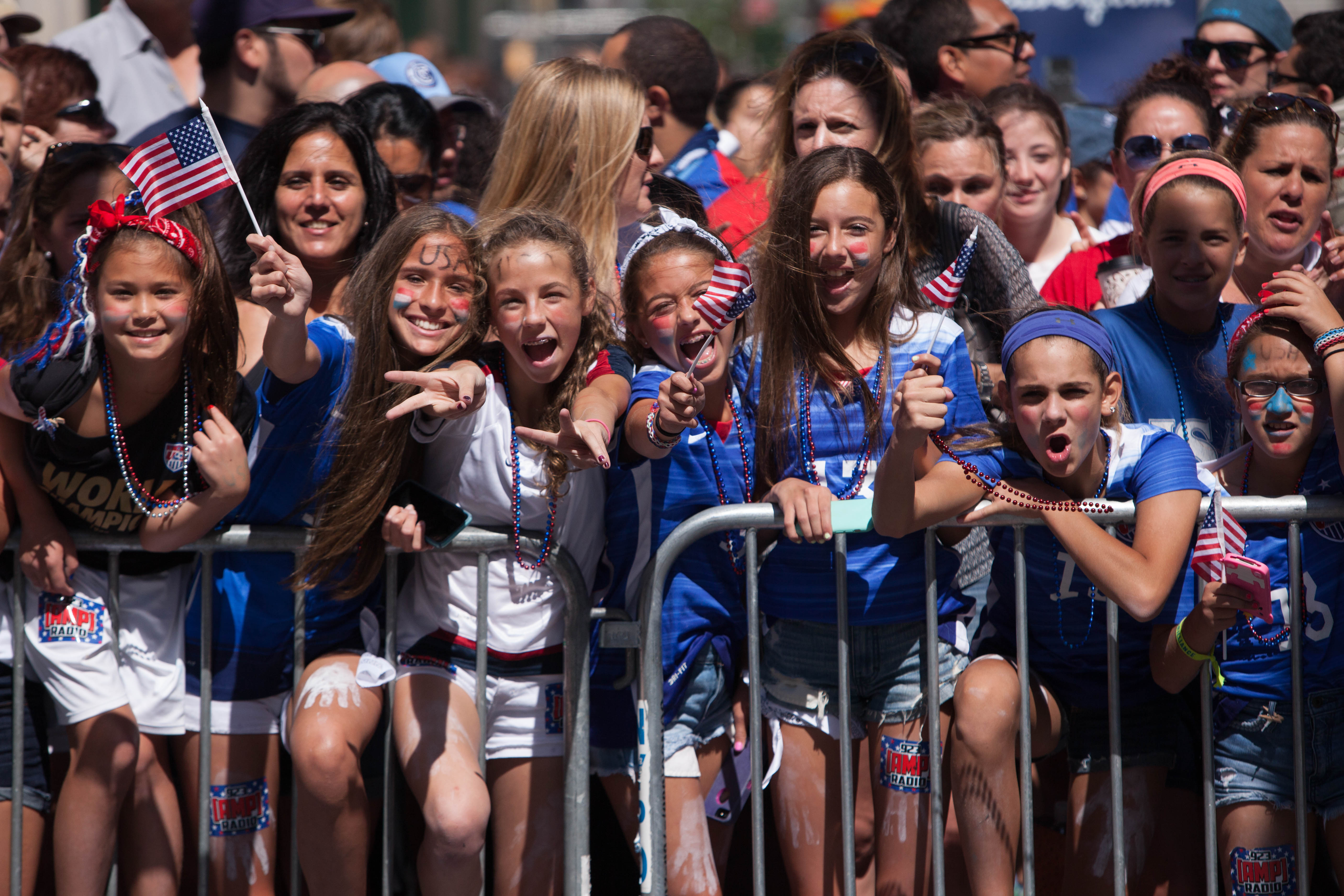
Young girls supporting the U.S. women's national soccer team at the ticker tape parade in New York City, celebrating their 2015 World Cup victory.

=== Media coverage ===
U.S. television coverage for the five Women's World Cups from 1995 to 2011 was provided by ESPN/ABC and Univision, while coverage rights for the three Women's World Cups from 2015 to 2023 were awarded to Fox Sports and Telemundo. In December 2021, a deal was signed to broadcast TV coverage of other USWNT games between TNT and TBS and streaming on HBO Max through the end of 2030. The USWNT games in the 2014 CONCACAF Women's Championship and the 2015 Algarve Cup were broadcast by Fox Sports. NBC will broadcast the Olympic tournament through 2032.

The 1999 World Cup final set the original record for largest U.S. television audience for a women's soccer match, averaging 18 million viewers. It was the most viewed English-language U.S. broadcast of any soccer match until the 2015 FIFA Women's World Cup final between the United States and Japan.

The 2015 Women's World Cup Final between the United States and Japan was the most watched soccer match, men's or women's, in American broadcast history. It averaged 23 million viewers and higher ratings than the NBA finals and the Stanley Cup finals. The final was also the most watched US-Spanish language broadcast of a FIFA Women's World Cup match in history.

Overall, there were over 750 million viewers for the 2015 FIFA Women's World Cup, making it the most watched Women's World Cup in history. The FIFA Women's World Cup is now the second-most watched FIFA tournament, with only the men's FIFA World Cup attracting more viewership.

=== In popular culture ===
A narrative nonfiction book covering the entire history of the team from 1985 to 2019 called The National Team: The Inside Story of the Women Who Changed Soccer was named one of Vanity Fair's best books of 2019 and made NPR's 2019 year-end books list. A book about the team's 1999 Women's World Cup campaign, Girls of Summer: The U.S. Women's Soccer Team and How It Changed the World was released in 2001 and in 2020 Netflix announced a film based on the book. In 2023, Netflix released a four-episode documentary series titled Under Pressure: The U.S. Women's World Cup Team which followed the team's progress at the 2023 Women's World Cup.

In 2005, HBO released a documentary called Dare to Dream: The Story of the U.S. Women's Soccer Team. In 2013, a documentary about the 1999 World Cup-winning team called The 99ers was produced by former player Julie Foudy and ESPN Films.

=== Attendance ===
The 1999 World Cup final, in which the United States defeated China, set a world attendance record for a women's soccer event of 90,185 in a sellout at the Rose Bowl in Southern California (until it was broken on March 30, 2022, with 91,553 people at the Camp Nou in Barcelona, Spain in the second-leg of a UEFA Women's Champions League match). The record for Olympic women's soccer attendance was set by the 2012 Olympic final between the USWNT and Japan, with 80,023 spectators at Wembley Stadium. The USWNT's attendance record for a home friendly (50,644) was set on April 6, 2024, in a 2–1 SheBelieves Cup win over Japan at Mercedes-Benz Stadium in Atlanta.

== Legal issues ==
=== Pay discrimination ===
Since 2016, the players of the U.S. team had waged an escalating legal fight with the United States Soccer Federation (USSF) over gender discrimination. Central to their demands was equal pay. The players pointed to their lower paychecks as compared to their male counterparts despite their higher record of success in recent years.

In April 2016, five U.S. team players filed a wage-discrimination action against the USSF with the Equal Employment Opportunity Commission. The group consisted of Hope Solo, Carli Lloyd, Alex Morgan, Megan Rapinoe, and Becky Sauerbrunn.

One year later, in April 2017, the U.S. team agreed to a new collective bargaining agreement (CBA) with the USSF. The agreement stated that the U.S. team players would have an increased base pay and improved match bonuses. These changes could increase their previous pay from $200,000 to $300,000. However, the CBA did not guarantee equal pay compared to the men's team. The CBA's five-year term through 2021 ensured that the next negotiation would not become an issue for the team for the 2019 World Cup and the 2020 Olympics. On top of this CBA, the USSF had agreed to pay the players for two years' worth of unequal per-diem payments.

On March 8, 2019, 28 members of the U.S. team filed a gender discrimination lawsuit against the USSF. The lawsuit, filed in the U.S. District Court in Los Angeles, accused the USSF of "institutional gender discrimination." The lawsuit claimed that the discrimination affected not only the amount the players were paid but also their playing, training, and travel conditions. In May 2020, several key parts of the case were dismissed, with federal judge R. Gary Klausner noting that the team had agreed to take higher base compensation and other benefits in their most recent CBA instead of the bonuses received by the men's team.

On March 8, 2021, the second anniversary of the team's pay discrimination lawsuit, Congresswomen Doris Matsui and Rosa DeLauro introduced the Give Our Athletes Level Salaries (GOALS) Act to ensure the team members "are paid fair and equitable wages compared to the U.S. Men's team." The GOALS Act threatened to cut federal funding for the 2026 World Cup if the USSF did not comply.

On February 22, 2022, the USSF agreed to settle the lawsuit for $24 million, contingent upon the U.S. team agreeing to a new CBA. $22 million would go to the players named in the case, and $2 million would contribute toward players' post-playing career and other women's soccer charitable efforts. On May 18, 2022, the U.S. team agreed to a new CBA that would run through 2028 and would equalize compensation, bonuses, and other work conditions between the women's and the men's national teams friendlies, therefore finalizing the legal settlement. The new agreement mandates that men and women split prize money from international competitions equally, making it the first such instance in the world.

=== Artificial turf ===
Along with their lawsuit for pay-equity, the US Women's Soccer players have fought FIFA on policies regarding artificial turf. This battle to eliminate its use in major women's games heightened around the 2015 FIFA Women's World Cup in Canada; during this tournament, the US played eight of their ten games on artificial turf. Prior to the 2015 World Cup, Abby Wambach headed a discrimination lawsuit with other global soccer stars including Marta of Brazil and Homare Sawa of Japan. Due to the tournament's quick approach, the suit was dropped as players were denied an expedited hearing.

== Staff ==
=== Coaching staff ===
Role	Name	Start date	Ref.
Head coach	(England) Emma Hayes	May 2024	
Assistant coaches	(United States) Denise Reddy	May 2024	
Assistant coaches	(United States) Tiffany Roberts	January 2022	
Goalkeeper coach	(England) Stuart Searle	May 2024	

=== Technical staff ===
Role	Name	Start date	Ref.
Sporting director	(Wales) Matt Crocker	April 2023	
Vice president of sporting	(United States) Oguchi Onyewu	May 2023	
Women's program director	(Belgium) Bart Caubergh	May 2024	

=== Head coach history ===
As of October 13, 2026, after match against Spain

Below is the record of each head coach in the national team's history. The winning percentages given are per U.S. Soccer, with draws counted as ½ wins.

Name	Years	Matches	Won	Drawn	Lost	Win %	World Cup	Olympics
(Republic of Ireland) Mike Ryan	1985	4	0	1	3	.125	N/A	N/A
(United States) Anson Dorrance	1986–1994	92	65	5	22	.734	1991 FIFA Women's World Cup	N/A
(United States) Tony DiCicco	1994–1999 (Note: DiCicco was also the stand-in head coach in place of Dorrance for one match on June 21, 1993 (a 3–0 win against Canada in Pontiac, Michigan). However, the win is officially credited to Dorrance.)	121	105	8	8	.901	1995 FIFA Women's World Cup 1999 FIFA Women's World Cup	Football at the 1996 Summer Olympics – Women's tournament
(United States) Lauren Gregg	2000 (interim) (Note: Gregg was also the stand-in head coach in place of DiCicco for one match on May 4, 1997 (a 6–1 win against South Korea in St. Charles, Illinois). However, the win is officially credited to DiCicco.)	3	2	1	0	.833	—	—
(United States) April Heinrichs	2000–2004	124	87	20	17	.782	2003 FIFA Women's World Cup	Football at the 2000 Summer Olympics – Women's tournament Football at the 2004 Summer Olympics – Women's tournament
(United States) Greg Ryan	2005–2007	55	45	9	1	.900	2007 FIFA Women's World Cup	—
(Sweden) Pia Sundhage	2008–2012	107	91	10	6	.897	2011 FIFA Women's World Cup	Football at the 2008 Summer Olympics – Women's tournament Football at the 2012 Summer Olympics – Women's tournament
(Scotland) Tom Sermanni	2012–2014	24	18	4	2	.833	—	—
(England) Jill Ellis	2012 (interim), 2014–2019	132	106	19	7	.875	2015 FIFA Women's World Cup 2019 FIFA Women's World Cup	5th
(North Macedonia) Vlatko Andonovski	2019–2023	65	51	9	5	.854	9th	Football at the 2020 Summer Olympics – Women's tournament
(United States) Twila Kilgore	2023–2024 (interim)	14	10	3	1	.821	—	—
(England) Emma Hayes	2024–present	42	33	3	6	.821		Football at the 2024 Summer Olympics – Women's tournament
Totals		783	613	92	78	.842		

== Players ==
=== Current squad ===
The following 23 players were named for the 2026 CONCACAF W Championship.

Caps and goals correct as of October 13, 2026, after the match against Spain.

No.	Pos.	Player	Date of birth (age)	Caps	Goals	Club
	GK	Claudia Dickey	January 6, 2000 (age 26)	12	0	(United States Soccer Federation) Seattle Reign FC
	GK	Phallon Tullis-Joyce	October 19, 1996 (age 30)	8	0	(The Football Association) Manchester United
	GK	Mandy McGlynn	November 3, 1998 (age 28)	6	0	(United States Soccer Federation) Utah Royals
	DF	Emily Fox	July 5, 1998 (age 28)	80	1	(The Football Association) Arsenal
	DF	Tierna Davidson	September 19, 1998 (age 28)	72	3	(United States Soccer Federation) Gotham FC
	DF	Avery Patterson	June 14, 2002 (age 24)	15	1	(United States Soccer Federation) Houston Dash
	DF	Gisele Thompson	December 2, 2005 (age 20)	13	0	(United States Soccer Federation) Angel City FC
	DF	Tara Rudd	July 2, 1999 (age 27)	12	0	(United States Soccer Federation) Washington Spirit
	DF	Kennedy Wesley	March 8, 2001 (age 25)	9	1	(United States Soccer Federation) San Diego Wave FC
	DF	Kate Del Fava	July 23, 1998 (age 28)	1	0	(United States Soccer Federation) Utah Royals
	DF	Evelyn Shores	December 29, 2004 (age 21)	0	0	(United States Soccer Federation) Angel City FC
	MF	Lindsey Heaps (captain)	May 26, 1994 (age 32)	180	40	(United States Soccer Federation) Denver Summit FC
	MF	Rose Lavelle	May 14, 1995 (age 31)	124	29	(United States Soccer Federation) Gotham FC
	MF	Sam Coffey	December 31, 1998 (age 27)	46	5	(The Football Association) Manchester City
	MF	Claire Hutton	January 11, 2006 (age 20)	22	1	(United States Soccer Federation) Bay FC
	MF	Lily Yohannes	June 12, 2007 (age 19)	22	1	(French Football Federation) Lyon
	MF	Croix Bethune	March 14, 2001 (age 25)	7	1	(United States Soccer Federation) Kansas City Current
	FW	Mallory Swanson	April 29, 1998 (age 28)	105	39	(United States Soccer Federation) Chicago Stars
	FW	Sophia Wilson	August 10, 2000 (age 26)	65	25	(United States Soccer Federation) Portland Thorns FC
	FW	Trinity Rodman	May 20, 2002 (age 24)	59	13	(United States Soccer Federation) Washington Spirit
	FW	Alyssa Thompson	November 7, 2004 (age 22)	34	4	(The Football Association) Chelsea
	FW	Ashley Sanchez	March 16, 1999 (age 27)	30	4	(United States Soccer Federation) North Carolina Courage
	FW	Michelle Cooper	December 4, 2002 (age 23)	16	1	(United States Soccer Federation) Kansas City Current

=== Recent call-ups ===
The following players have also been called up to the squad within the past 12 months.

Pos.	Player	Date of birth (age)	Caps	Goals	Club	Latest call-up
GK	Jordan Silkowitz	March 27, 2000 (age 26)	0	0	(United States) Bay FC	v. Spain; October 13, 2026
GK	Jane Campbell	February 17, 1995 (age 31)	10	0	(United States) Houston Dash	v. Brazil; June 9, 2026
DF	Lilly Reale	August 12, 2003 (age 23)	9	0	(United States) Boston Legacy	v. Spain; October 13, 2026
DF	Naomi Girma	June 14, 2000 (age 26)	54	3	(England) Chelsea	v. Spain; October 10, 2026^{INJ}
DF	Emily Sonnett	November 25, 1993 (age 32)	118	2	(United States) Gotham FC	v. Brazil; June 9, 2026
DF	Emily Sams	July 1, 1999 (age 27)	10	1	(United States) Angel City FC	v. Japan; April 17, 2026
DF	Jordyn Bugg ^{PRE}	August 11, 2006 (age 20)	6	0	(United States) Seattle Reign FC	2026 SheBelieves Cup
DF	Kate Wiesner ^{PRE}	February 11, 2001 (age 25)	3	0	(United States) Washington Spirit	2026 SheBelieves Cup
DF	Izzy Rodriguez	April 13, 1999 (age 27)	2	1	(United States) Kansas City Current	v. Chile; January 27, 2026
DF	Ayo Oke	April 5, 2003 (age 23)	1	0	(United States) Denver Summit FC	v. Chile; January 27, 2026
MF	Jaelin Howell	November 21, 1999 (age 27)	7	1	(United States) Gotham FC	v. Spain; October 13, 2026
MF	Jaedyn Shaw	November 20, 2004 (age 22)	37	10	(United States) Gotham FC	v. Brazil; June 9, 2026
MF	Olivia Moultrie	September 17, 2005 (age 21)	18	5	(United States) Portland Thorns FC	v. Brazil; June 9, 2026
MF	Riley Jackson	December 2, 2005 (age 20)	1	0	(United States) North Carolina Courage	v. Brazil; June 9, 2026
MF	Hal Hershfelt	October 3, 2001 (age 25)	5	0	(United States) Washington Spirit	v. Chile; January 27, 2026
MF	Lo'eau LaBonta	March 18, 1993 (age 33)	5	0	(United States) Kansas City Current	v. Chile; January 27, 2026
MF	Sam Meza	November 7, 2001 (age 25)	3	0	(United States) Seattle Reign FC	v. Chile; January 27, 2026
MF	Sally Menti	March 10, 2002 (age 24)	1	0	(United States) Seattle Reign FC	v. Chile; January 27, 2026
FW	Emma Sears	February 23, 2001 (age 25)	22	6	(United States) Racing Louisville	v. Spain; October 13, 2026
FW	Pietra Tordin	March 30, 2004 (age 22)	1	0	(United States) Portland Thorns FC	v. Spain; October 13, 2026
FW	Trinity Byars	January 29, 2003 (age 23)	0	0	(United States) San Diego Wave FC	v. Spain; October 13, 2026
FW	Ally Sentnor	February 18, 2004 (age 22)	23	7	(United States) Kansas City Current	v. Brazil; June 9, 2026
FW	Jameese Joseph	May 3, 2002 (age 24)	5	1	(United States) Chicago Stars FC	v. Japan; April 17, 2026
FW	Maddie Dahlien	July 25, 2004 (age 22)	3	0	(United States) Seattle Reign FC	2026 SheBelieves Cup
FW	Yazmeen Ryan	February 25, 1999 (age 27)	16	2	(United States) Denver Summit FC	v. Chile; January 27, 2026
FW	Reilyn Turner	October 18, 2002 (age 24)	1	1	(United States) Portland Thorns FC	v. Chile; January 27, 2026
FW	Catarina Macario	October 4, 1999 (age 27)	29	16	(United States) San Diego Wave FC	v. Italy; December 1, 2025
Notes: ^{INJ} = Withdrew due to injury; ^{PRE} = Preliminary squad / standby

== Results and fixtures ==
The following is a list of match results in the last 12 months, as well as any future matches that have been scheduled.

Legend

Win Draw Loss Fixture

=== 2025 ===
November 28 Friendly	United States	3–0	Italy	Orlando, Florida
19:00 ET	Moultrie 2'; Macario 64', 76'	Report		Stadium: Inter&Co Stadium; Attendance: 14,199; Referee: Sandra Benitez (El Salvador)

December 1 Friendly	United States	2–0	Italy	Fort Lauderdale, Florida
19:00 ET	Macario 20'; Shaw 41'	Report		Stadium: Chase Stadium; Attendance: 9,471; Referee: Priscilla Perez (Mexico)

=== 2026 ===
January 24 Friendly	United States	6–0	Paraguay	Carson, California
17:30 ET	Turner 45+3'; Sentnor 47', 57'; Martínez 53' (o.g.); Rodman 56'; Sears 72'	Report		Stadium: Dignity Health Sports Park; Attendance: 19,397; Referee: Marianela Araya (Costa Rica)

January 27 Friendly	United States	5–0	Chile	Santa Barbara, California
22:00 ET	Bethune 18'; Joseph 26'; Sams 33'; Sears 46'; Rodman 68'	Report		Stadium: Harder Stadium; Attendance: 14,797; Referee: Timothy Derry (Trinidad and Tobago)

March 1 SheBelieves Cup	United States	2–0	Argentina	Nashville, Tennessee
16:00 ET	Heaps 20'; Shaw 56'	Report		Stadium: Geodis Park; Attendance: 17,125; Referee: Timothy Derry (Trinidad and Tobago)

March 4 SheBelieves Cup	United States	1–0	Canada	Columbus, Ohio
18:45 ET	Sentnor 55'	Report		Stadium: ScottsMiracle-Gro Field; Attendance: 18,545; Referee: Lizzet Garcia (Mexico)

March 7 SheBelieves Cup	United States	1–0	Colombia	Harrison, New Jersey
15:30 ET	A. Thompson 82'	Report		Stadium: Sports Illustrated Stadium; Attendance: 22,385; Referee: Vimarest Diaz (Dominican Republic)

April 11 Friendly	United States	2–1	Japan	San Jose, California
17:30 ET	Lavelle 9'; Heaps 48'	Report	Ueki 61'	Stadium: PayPal Park; Attendance: 17,435; Referee: Karen Andrade (Mexico)

April 14 Friendly	United States	0–1	Japan	Seattle, Washington
22:00 ET		Report	Hamano 27'	Stadium: Lumen Field; Attendance: 36,128; Referee: Janeishka Caban (Puerto Rico)

April 17 Friendly	United States	3–0	Japan	Commerce City, Colorado
21:00 ET	Girma 47'; Lavelle 56'; Wesley 64'	Report		Stadium: Dick's Sporting Goods Park; Attendance: 17,589; Referee: Myriam Marcotte (Canada)

June 6 Friendly	Brazil	2–1	United States	São Paulo, Brazil
17:30 ET	Maranhão 11'; Zaneratto 14'	Report	Wilson 2'	Stadium: Neo Química Arena; Attendance: 31,336; Referee: María Eugenia Gil Soriano (Spain)

June 9 Friendly	Brazil	0–1	United States	Fortaleza, Brazil
20:30 ET		Report	Chagas 63' (o.g.)	Stadium: Arena Castelão; Attendance: 55,744; Referee: Paola Cebollada Lopez (Spain)

October 10 Friendly	United States	0–2	Spain	Washington, D.C.
14:30 ET		Report	Guijarro 3'; Navarro 14'	Stadium: Audi Field; Attendance: 19,220; Referee: Diana Pérez (Mexico)

October 13 Friendly	United States	2–2	Spain	Chester, Pennsylvania
19:00 ET	Sanchez 49'; Swanson 86'	Report	Putellas 27'; Paralluelo 32'	Stadium: Subaru Park; Attendance: 18,648; Referee: Myriam Marcotte (Canada)

November 27 2026 CONCACAF W Championship QF	United States	v	El Salvador	Mansfield, Texas
19ː30 CT		Report		Stadium: Texas Health Mansfield Stadium

=== 2027 ===
January 12 Friendly	United States	v	Panama	Carson, California
				Stadium: Dignity Health Sports Park

- USWNT Schedule
- USWNT Results
- USA: Fixtures and Results – FIFA.com

== All-time results ==
As of October 13, 2026

Year	M	W	D	L	GF	GA	Athlete of the Year	Scoring leader	G	Assist leader	A	Coach	Major tournam. result
1985	4	0	1	3	3	7	Sharon McMurtry	Michelle Akers	2			Mike Ryan	
1986	6	4	0	2	10	6	April Heinrichs	Marcia McDermott	4			Anson Dorrance	
1987	11	6	1	4	23	9	Carin Jennings-Gabarra	April Heinrichs	7			Anson Dorrance	
1988	8	3	2	3	10	9	Joy Fawcett	Carin Jennings-Gabarra	5	Carin Jennings-Gabarra, Kristine Lilly	2	Anson Dorrance	
1989	1	0	1	0	0	0	April Heinrichs	(none)		(none)		Anson Dorrance	
1990	6	6	0	0	26	3	Michelle Akers	Michelle Akers	9	Kristine Lilly	3	Anson Dorrance	
1991	28	21	1	6	122	22	Michelle Akers	Michelle Akers	39	Carin Jennings-Gabarra	21	Anson Dorrance	World Cup (champions)
1992	2	0	0	2	3	7	Carin Jennings-Gabarra	(3 players tied)	1	Tisha Venturini-Hoch	2	Anson Dorrance	
1993	17	13	0	4	54	7	Kristine Lilly	Mia Hamm	10	Michelle Akers	6	Anson Dorrance	
1994	13	12	0	1	59	6	Mia Hamm	Michelle Akers	11	Michelle Akers	7	Anson Dorrance	
1995	25	21	2	2	91	17	Mia Hamm	Mia Hamm	19	Mia Hamm	18	Tony DiCicco	World Cup (3rd place)
1996	24	21	2	1	80	17	Mia Hamm	Tiffeny Milbrett	13	Mia Hamm	18	Tony DiCicco	Olympics (gold medal)
1997	18	16	0	2	67	13	Mia Hamm	Mia Hamm	18	Tiffeny Milbrett	14	Tony DiCicco	
1998	25	22	2	1	89	12	Mia Hamm	Mia Hamm	20	Mia Hamm	20	Tony DiCicco	
1999	29	25	2	2	111	15	Michelle Akers	Tiffeny Milbrett	21	Mia Hamm	16	Tony DiCicco	World Cup (champions)
2000	41	26	9	6	124	31	Tiffeny Milbrett	Cindy Parlow Cone	19	Mia Hamm	14	Lauren Gregg, April Heinrichs	Olympics (silver medal)
2001	10	3	2	5	13	15	Tiffeny Milbrett	Tiffeny Milbrett	3	Mia Hamm	2	A. Heinrichs	
2002	19	15	2	2	69	11	Shannon MacMillan		17	Aly Wagner	11	A. Heinrichs	
2003	23	17	4	2	58	14	Abby Wambach		9	Mia Hamm	9	A. Heinrichs	World Cup (3rd place)
2004	34	28	4	2	104	23	Abby Wambach		31	Mia Hamm	22	A. Heinrichs	Olympics (gold medal)
2005	9	8	1	0	24	0	Kristine Lilly	Christie Welsh	7	Aly Wagner, Abby Wambach	5	Greg Ryan	
2006	22	18	4	0	57	10	Kristine Lilly	Abby Wambach	17	Abby Wambach	8	Greg Ryan	
2007	24	19	4	1	63	17	Abby Wambach	Abby Wambach	20	Kristine Lilly	8	Greg Ryan	World Cup (3rd place)
2008	36	33	2	1	84	17	Carli Lloyd	Natasha Kai	15	Heather O'Reilly, Abby Wambach	10	Pia Sundhage	Olympics (gold medal)
2009	8	7	1	0	12	1	Hope Solo	(3 players tied)	2	Heather O'Reilly	3	Pia Sundhage	
2010	18	15	2	1	48	8	Abby Wambach		16	Lori Lindsey	7	Pia Sundhage	
2011	20	13	4	3	41	17	Abby Wambach		8	Lauren Holiday, Megan Rapinoe	5	Pia Sundhage	World Cup (2nd place)
2012	32	28	3	1	120	21	Alex Morgan		28	Alex Morgan	21	P. Sundhage, Jill Ellis	Olympics (gold medal)
2013	16	13	3	0	56	11	Abby Wambach		11	Lauren Holiday, Abby Wambach	6	Tom Sermanni	
2014	24	16	5	3	79	15	Lauren Holiday	Carli Lloyd	15	Carli Lloyd	8	T. Sermanni, J. Ellis	
2015	26	20	4	2	74	12	Carli Lloyd	Carli Lloyd	18	Megan Rapinoe	10	J. Ellis	World Cup (champions)
2016	25	22	3	0	92	10	Tobin Heath	Carli Lloyd, Alex Morgan	17	Carli Lloyd	11	J. Ellis	Olympics (quarter-finals)
2017	16	12	1	3	40	13	Julie Ertz	Alex Morgan	7	Megan Rapinoe	5	J. Ellis	
2018	20	18	2	0	65	10	Alex Morgan	Alex Morgan	18	Megan Rapinoe	12	J. Ellis	
2019	24	20	3	1	77	16	Julie Ertz	Carli Lloyd	16	Christen Press	12	J. Ellis, Vlatko Andonovski	World Cup (champions)
2020	9	9	0	0	33	1	Sam Mewis	Lindsey Heaps, Christen Press	7	Lynn Biyendolo	6	V. Andonovski	
2021	24	17	5	2	76	12	Lindsey Heaps	Carli Lloyd	11	Carli Lloyd	6	V. Andonovski	Olympics (bronze medal)
2022	18	14	1	3	56	9	Sophia Wilson		11	Mallory Swanson	7	V. Andonovski	
2023	18	14	4	0	36	3	Naomi Girma	Mallory Swanson	7	Alex Morgan, Trinity Rodman	5	V. Andonovski, Twila Kilgore	World Cup (Round of 16)
2024	23	18	4	1	50	12	Alyssa Naeher	Sophia Wilson	9	Trinity Rodman, Sophia Wilson, Mallory Swanson	4	T. Kilgore, Emma Hayes	Olympics (gold medal)
2025	15	12	0	3	41	8	Rose Lavelle	Catarina Macario	8	Rose Lavelle, Catarina Macario, Ally Sentnor, Alyssa Thompson	3	E. Hayes	
2026	12	8	1	3	22	6	TBD	TBD		TBD		E. Hayes	
Total	783	613	92	78	2,364	473							

== Individual records ==
=== Player records ===
As of October 13, 2026

Players in bold are still active with the national team.

The women's national team boasts the first six players in the history of the game to have earned 200 caps. These players have since been joined in the 200-cap club by several players from other national teams, as well as by seven more Americans: Kate Markgraf, Abby Wambach, Heather O'Reilly, Carli Lloyd, Hope Solo, Becky Sauerbrunn, and Alex Morgan. Kristine Lilly, Carli Lloyd, and Christie Pearce are three of the four players in international soccer to earn more than 300 caps, the other being Canada's Christine Sinclair.

In March 2004, Mia Hamm and Michelle Akers were the only two women and the only two Americans named to the FIFA 100, a list of the 125 greatest living soccer players chosen by Pelé as part of FIFA's centenary observances.

Most caps
Rank	Player	Caps	Goals	Years
1	Kristine Lilly	354	130	1987–2010
2	Carli Lloyd	316	134	2005–2021
3	Christie Pearce	311	2	1997–2015
4	Mia Hamm	276	158	1987–2004
5	Julie Foudy	274	45	1988–2004
6	Abby Wambach	255	184	2001–2015
7	Joy Fawcett	241	27	1987–2004
8	Heather O'Reilly	231	47	2002–2016
9	Alex Morgan	224	123	2010–2024
10	Becky Sauerbrunn	219	0	2008–2024

Most goals
Rank	Player	Goals	Caps	Years	Avg
1	Abby Wambach	184	255	2001–2015	0.72
2	Mia Hamm	158	276	1987–2004	0.57
3	Carli Lloyd	134	316	2005–2021	0.42
4	Kristine Lilly	130	354	1987–2010	0.37
5	Alex Morgan	123	224	2010–2024	0.55
6	Michelle Akers	107	155	1985–2000	0.69
7	Tiffeny Milbrett	100	206	1991–2005	0.49
8	Cindy Parlow Cone	75	158	1996–2004	0.47
9	Christen Press	64	155	2013–2021	0.41
10	Megan Rapinoe	63	203	2006–2023	0.31

Most assists
Rank	Player	Assists	Caps	Years	Avg
1	Mia Hamm	147	276	1987–2004	0.53
2	Kristine Lilly	106	354	1987–2010	0.30
3	Megan Rapinoe	73	203	2006–2023	0.36
3	Abby Wambach	73	255	2001–2015	0.29
5	Carli Lloyd	64	316	2005–2021	0.20
6	Tiffeny Milbrett	63	206	1991–2005	0.31
7	Heather O'Reilly	55	231	2002–2016	0.24
7	Julie Foudy	55	274	1988–2004	0.20
9	Alex Morgan	53	224	2010–2024	0.24
10	Shannon MacMillan	50	177	1993–2005	0.28

Most shutouts
Rank	Player	Shutouts	Caps	Years	Avg
1	Hope Solo	102	202	2000–2016	0.51
2	Briana Scurry	72	175	1994–2008	0.41
3	Alyssa Naeher	69	115	2014–2024	0.60
4	Nicole Barnhart	24	54	2004–2013	0.44
5	Siri Mullinix	21	45	1999–2004	0.47
6	**Casey Murphy**	15	20	2021–	0.75
7	Mary Harvey	13	27	1989–1996	0.48
7	Saskia Webber	13	28	1992–2000	0.46
9	Amy Allmann	10	24	1987–1991	0.42
10	Kim Maslin-Kammerdeiner	9	17	1988–1991	0.53
10	LaKeysia Beene	9	18	2000–2003	0.50
10	Ashlyn Harris	9	25	2013–2022	0.36

Captains
Years as captain	Player	Caps	Goals	Years	Ref.
1985	Denise Bender	4	0	1985	
1986–1987	Emily Pickering	15	2	1985–1992	
1988–1991	Lori Henry	39	3	1985–1991	
1991	April Heinrichs	46	35	1986–1991	
1993–2000	Carla Overbeck	170	4	1988–2000	
2000–2004	Julie Foudy	274	45	1988–2004	
2000–2004	Joy Fawcett	241	27	1987–2004	
2004–2008	Kristine Lilly	354	130	1987–2010	
2008–2015	Christie Pearce	311	4	1997–2015	
2016–2018; 2021–2023	Becky Sauerbrunn	219	0	2008–2024	
2016–2020	Carli Lloyd	316	134	2005–2021	
2018–2020	Megan Rapinoe	203	63	2006–2023	
2018–2020; 2023–2024	Alex Morgan	224	123	2010–2024	
2023–	**Lindsey Heaps**	180	40	2013–	

Most goals in a match (Note: The goal record for most scored in a match by a member of the USWNT is five, which has been accomplished by nine players)
Rank	Player	Goals	Date	Opponent	Location	Competition	Line-up
1	Brandi Chastain	5	April 18, 1991	Mexico	Port-au-Prince, Haiti	World Cup Qualifying Tournament	Substitute (41') (80 minute match)
1	Michelle Akers	5	November 24, 1991	Chinese Taipei	Foshan, China	1991 FIFA World Cup	Starting (80 minute match)
1	Tiffeny Milbrett	5	November 2, 2002	Panama	Seattle, United States	2002 CONCACAF Gold Cup	Starting
1	Abby Wambach	5	October 23, 2004	Republic of Ireland	Houston, United States	International Friendly	Starting
1	Amy Rodriguez	5	January 20, 2012	Dominican Republic	Vancouver, Canada	2012 Olympic Qualifying Tournament	Substitute (46')
1	Sydney Leroux	5	January 22, 2012	Guatemala	Vancouver, Canada	2012 Olympic Qualifying Tournament	Substitute (46')
1	Crystal Dunn	5	February 15, 2016	Puerto Rico	Frisco, United States	2016 Olympic Qualifying Tournament	Starting
1	Alex Morgan	5	June 11, 2019	Thailand	Reims, France	2019 FIFA World Cup	Starting
1	Carli Lloyd	5	September 16, 2021	Paraguay	Cleveland, United States	International Friendly	Starting

==== All-Time Best XI ====
The following players were chosen as the USWNT All-Time Best XI in December 2013 by the United States Soccer Federation:

- Goalkeeper: Briana Scurry
- Defenders: Brandi Chastain, Carla Overbeck, Christie Rampone, Joy Fawcett
- Midfielders: Kristine Lilly, Michelle Akers, Julie Foudy
- Forwards: Mia Hamm, Abby Wambach, Alex Morgan

=== Head coach records ===
- Most appearances: (England) Jill Ellis: 132
- Most wins: (England) Jill Ellis: 106

== Team records ==
Biggest victory: 14–0 vs. Dominican Republic, January 20, 2012

Biggest defeat: 0–4 vs. Brazil, September 27, 2007

Longest winning streak: 18 games, 25 July 1990 to 25 May 1991

Longest unbeaten streak: 51 games, 8 December 2004 to 22 September 2007

Longest losing streak: 3 games, 30 August 1991 to 4 October 1991; 12 March 1993 to 7 April 1993; and 7 October 2022 to 10 November 2022

Longest winless streak: 5 games, 17 December 2000 to 11 March 2001

== Competitive record ==
=== FIFA Women's World Cup ===
The team has participated in every World Cup through 2023 and won a medal in each of the first eight editions until 2023, when they lost to Sweden on penalties in the round of 16.

FIFA Women's World Cup record
Host	Result	Pld	W	D*	L	GF	GA	Coach
(China) 1991	Champions	6	6	0	0	25	5	Anson Dorrance
(Sweden) 1995	Third place	6	4	1	1	15	5	Tony DiCicco
(United States) 1999	Champions	6	5	1	0	18	3	Tony DiCicco
(United States) 2003	Third place	6	5	0	1	15	5	April Heinrichs
(China) 2007	Third place	6	4	1	1	12	7	Greg Ryan
(Germany) 2011	Runners-up	6	3	2	1	13	7	Pia Sundhage
(Canada) 2015	Champions	7	6	1	0	14	3	Jill Ellis
(France) 2019	Champions	7	7	0	0	26	3	Jill Ellis
(Australia) (New Zealand) 2023	Round of 16	4	1	3	0	4	1	Vlatko Andonovski
(Brazil) 2027	To be determined							
(Costa Rica) (Jamaica) (Mexico) (United States) 2031	Qualified as co-hosts							
(United Kingdom) 2035	To be determined							
Total	10/12	54	41	9	4	142	39	

*Denotes draws include knockout matches decided via penalty shoot-out.

=== Olympic Games ===
The team has participated in every Olympic tournament through 2024 and reached the gold medal game in each until 2016, when they were eliminated in the quarter-finals by Sweden. The team won a record-extending fifth Olympic gold medal in 2024, their first since 2012.

(International Olympic Committee) Olympic Games record
Year	Result	Pld	W	D*	L	GF	GA	Coach
(United States) 1996	Gold medal	5	4	1	0	9	3	Tony DiCicco
(Australia) 2000	Silver medal	5	3	1	1	9	5	April Heinrichs
(Greece) 2004	Gold medal	6	5	1	0	12	4	April Heinrichs
(China) 2008	Gold medal	6	5	0	1	12	5	Pia Sundhage
(United Kingdom) 2012	Gold medal	6	6	0	0	16	6	Pia Sundhage
(Brazil) 2016	Quarter-finals	4	2	2	0	6	3	Jill Ellis
(Japan) 2020	Bronze medal	6	2	2	2	12	10	Vlatko Andonovski
(France) 2024	Gold medal	6	6	0	0	12	2	Emma Hayes
(United States) 2028	Qualified as hosts							
Total	8/9	44	33	7	4	88	38	

*Denotes draws include knockout matches decided via penalty shoot-out.

=== CONCACAF W Championship ===
CONCACAF W Championship record
Year	Result	Pld	W	D*	L	GF	GA	Coach
(Haiti) 1991	Champions	5	5	0	0	49	0	Anson Dorrance
(United States) 1993	Champions	3	3	0	0	13	0	Anson Dorrance
(Canada) 1994	Champions	4	4	0	0	16	1	Tony DiCicco
(Canada) 1998	Did not participate^{1}							
(United States) 2000	Champions	5	4	1	0	24	1	April Heinrichs
(Canada) (United States) 2002	Champions	5	5	0	0	24	1	April Heinrichs
(United States) 2006	Champions	2	2	0	0	4	1	Greg Ryan
(Mexico) 2010	Third place	5	4	0	1	22	2	Pia Sundhage
(United States) 2014	Champions	5	5	0	0	21	0	Jill Ellis
(United States) 2018	Champions	5	5	0	0	26	0	Jill Ellis
(Mexico) 2022	Champions	5	5	0	0	13	0	Vlatko Andonovski
(United States) 2026	Qualified							
Total	10/12	44	42	1	1	212	6	

^{1} The U.S. team directly qualified for the 1999 FIFA Women's World Cup as hosts of the event. Because of this, they did not participate in the 1998 CONCACAF Championship, which was the qualification tournament for the World Cup.

*Denotes draws include knockout matches decided via penalty shoot-out.

=== CONCACAF W Gold Cup ===
CONCACAF W Gold Cup record
Year	Result	Pld	W	D*	L	GF	GA	Coach
(United States) 2024	Champions	6	4	1	1	15	4	Twila Kilgore
(N/A) 2029	To be determined							
Total	1/2	6	4	1	1	15	4	

*Denotes draws include knockout matches decided via penalty shoot-out.

=== Minor tournaments ===
==== SheBelieves Cup ====
The SheBelieves Cup is a global invitational tournament for national teams in women's soccer hosted in the United States.

(United States) SheBelieves Cup record
Year	Result	Matches	Wins	Draws	Losses	GF	GA	Coach
2016	Champions	3	3	0	0	4	1	Jill Ellis
2017	4th place	3	1	0	2	1	4	Jill Ellis
2018	Champions	3	2	1	0	3	1	Jill Ellis
2019	Runners-up	3	1	2	0	5	4	Jill Ellis
2020	Champions	3	3	0	0	6	1	Vlatko Andonovski
2021	Champions	3	3	0	0	9	0	Vlatko Andonovski
2022	Champions	3	2	1	0	10	0	Vlatko Andonovski
2023	Champions	3	3	0	0	5	1	Vlatko Andonovski
2024	Champions	2	1	1	0	4	3	Twila Kilgore
2025	Runners-up	3	2	0	1	5	3	Emma Hayes
2026	Champions	3	3	0	0	4	0	Emma Hayes
Total	11/11	32	24	5	3	56	18	

==== Tournament of Nations ====
The Tournament of Nations was a global invitational tournament for national teams in women's soccer hosted in the United States in non-World Cup and non-Olympic years.

(United States) Tournament of Nations record
Year	Result	Matches	Wins	Draws	Losses	GF	GA	Coach
2017	Runners-up	3	2	0	1	7	4	Jill Ellis
2018	Champions	3	2	1	0	9	4	Jill Ellis
Total		6	4	1	1	16	8	

==== Algarve Cup ====
The Algarve Cup was a global invitational tournament for national teams in women's soccer hosted by the Portuguese Football Federation (FPF). Held annually in the Algarve region of Portugal since 1994, it has been one of the more prestigious women's soccer events other than the Women's World Cup and Olympic tournament, and it has been nicknamed the "Mini FIFA Women's World Cup." Since 2016, the SheBelieves Cup replaced it on the U.S. team's schedule.

(Portugal) Algarve Cup record
Year	Result	Matches	Wins	Draws	Losses	GF	GA	Coach
1994	Runners-up	3	2	0	1	6	1	Tony DiCicco
1995	4th place	4	2	1	1	8	5	Tony DiCicco
1996	Did not enter							
1997	Did not enter							
1998	3rd place	4	3	0	1	10	6	Tony DiCicco
1999	Runners-up	4	2	1	1	8	4	Tony DiCicco
2000	Champions	4	4	0	0	11	1	April Heinrichs
2001	6th place	4	1	0	3	5	9	April Heinrichs
2002	5th place	4	2	1	1	8	6	April Heinrichs
2003	Champions	4	2	2	0	5	2	April Heinrichs
2004	Champions	4	3	0	1	11	5	April Heinrichs
2005	Champions	4	4	0	0	9	0	Greg Ryan
2006	Runners-up	4	2	2	0	9	1	Greg Ryan
2007	Champions	4	4	0	0	8	3	Greg Ryan
2008	Champions	4	4	0	0	12	1	Pia Sundhage
2009	Runners-up	4	3	1	0	5	1	Pia Sundhage
2010	Champions	4	4	0	0	9	3	Pia Sundhage
2011	Champions	4	4	0	0	12	3	Pia Sundhage
2012	3rd place	4	3	0	1	11	2	Pia Sundhage
2013	Champions	4	3	1	0	11	1	Tom Sermanni
2014	7th place	4	1	1	2	7	7	Tom Sermanni
2015	Champions	4	3	1	0	7	1	Jill Ellis
Total		79	56	11	12	172	62	

== Head-to-head records ==
As of June 9, 2026

Key
Positive balance (more Wins)
Neutral balance (Wins = Losses)
Negative balance (more Losses)

Opponent	GP	W	D	L	GF	GA	GD	First match	Most recent match	Win %
Canada	68	55	9	4	195	44	+151	July 7, 1986	March 4, 2026	0.875
China	61	39	13	9	107	38	+69	July 20, 1986	May 31, 2025	0.775
Norway	50	29	2	19	93	61	+32	July 5, 1987	June 11, 2017	0.600
Japan	45	34	8	3	119	35	+84	July 25, 1986	April 17, 2026	0.844
Brazil	45	35	5	5	95	32	+63	July 22, 1986	June 9, 2026	0.833
Mexico	44	41	1	2	173	17	+156	April 18, 1991	July 13, 2024	0.943
Sweden	43	23	13	7	72	39	+33	July 9, 1987	August 6, 2023	0.686
Germany	37	25	7	5	74	34	+40	May 30, 1991	August 6, 2024	0.770
Australia	36	30	5	1	104	32	+72	December 16, 1987	February 23, 2025	0.903
Denmark	25	17	3	5	63	22	+41	August 21, 1985	January 21, 2018	0.740
France	25	19	3	3	58	23	+35	July 29, 1988	April 13, 2021	0.820
New Zealand	22	20	1	1	88	7	+81	December 15, 1987	October 29, 2025	0.932
England	20	12	3	5	41	15	+26	August 23, 1985	November 30, 2024	0.675
Costa Rica	18	17	1	0	90	2	+88	June 25, 2000	July 16, 2024	0.972
South Korea	17	13	4	0	56	5	+51	May 2, 1997	June 4, 2024	0.882
Iceland	17	15	2	0	49	8	+41	May 8, 1998	October 27, 2024	0.941
Republic of Ireland	17	17	0	0	59	1	+58	September 4, 1999	June 29, 2025	1.000
Italy	17	12	1	4	33	8	+25	August 18, 1985	December 1, 2025	0.735
Colombia	15	13	2	0	44	2	+42	July 2, 2011	March 7, 2026	0.933
Finland	14	14	0	0	46	2	+44	March 14, 1995	March 7, 2011	1.000
Portugal	13	11	1	1	43	3	+40	March 16, 1994	October 26, 2025	0.885
Netherlands	12	9	2	1	34	10	+24	May 28, 1991	December 3, 2024	0.833
Trinidad and Tobago	11	11	0	0	74	2	+72	April 22, 1991	October 10, 2018	1.000
Russia	10	9	1	0	51	8	+43	July 14, 1993	April 9, 2017	0.950
Haiti	8	8	0	0	49	0	+49	April 25, 1991	July 4, 2022	1.000
Nigeria	8	8	0	0	25	3	+22	June 24, 1999	September 6, 2022	1.000
Argentina	7	7	0	0	37	1	+36	April 24, 1998	March 1, 2026	1.000
North Korea	6	5	1	0	14	2	+12	June 27, 1999	March 12, 2014	0.917
Jamaica	6	6	0	0	35	0	+35	August 19, 1994	June 3, 2025	1.000
Chinese Taipei	5	4	0	1	30	3	+27	December 10, 1987	October 1, 2006	0.800
Ukraine	4	4	0	0	20	1	+19	January 18, 1996	July 10, 2005	1.000
Switzerland	4	4	0	0	16	2	+14	August 20, 2014	October 23, 2016	1.000
Scotland	4	4	0	0	16	4	+12	September 8, 2002	November 13, 2018	1.000
Spain	4	3	0	1	4	3	+1	January 22, 2019	October 11, 2022	0.750
South Africa	4	4	0	0	9	0	+9	July 9, 2016	September 24, 2023	1.000
Chile	4	4	0	0	15	0	+15	August 31, 2018	January 27, 2026	1.000
Guatemala	3	3	0	0	27	0	+27	October 30, 2010	October 17, 2014	1.000
Panama	3	3	0	0	22	0	+22	November 2, 2002	January 31, 2020	1.000
Paraguay	3	3	0	0	23	0	+23	September 16, 2021	January 24, 2026	1.000
West Germany	2	2	0	0	5	1	+4	July 22, 1988	August 11, 1990	1.000
Soviet Union	2	2	0	0	13	0	+13	August 5, 1990	April 7, 1991	1.000
Romania	2	2	0	0	13	1	+12	November 10, 2016	November 13, 2016	1.000
Thailand	2	2	0	0	22	0	+22	September 15, 2016	June 11, 2019	1.000
Czech Republic	2	1	1	0	8	1	+7	January 7, 2000	February 17, 2022	0.750
Uzbekistan	2	2	0	0	18	1	+17	April 9, 2022	April 12, 2022	1.000
Dominican Republic	2	2	0	0	19	0	+19	January 20, 2012	February 20, 2024	1.000
Czechoslovakia	1	0	1	0	0	0	0	June 5, 1988		0.500
Poland	1	0	1	0	0	0	0	June 21, 1989		0.500
(Socialist Federal Republic of Yugoslavia) Yugoslavia	1	1	0	0	8	0	+8	April 1, 1991		1.000
Bulgaria	1	1	0	0	3	0	+3	April 2, 1991		1.000
Hungary	1	1	0	0	6	0	+6	April 3, 1991		1.000
Martinique	1	1	0	0	12	0	+12	April 20, 1991		1.000
Greece	1	1	0	0	3	0	+3	August 11, 2004		1.000
Puerto Rico	1	1	0	0	10	0	+10	February 15, 2016		1.000
Belgium	1	1	0	0	6	0	+6	April 7, 2019		1.000
Wales	1	1	0	0	2	0	+2	July 9, 2023		1.000
Vietnam	1	1	0	0	3	0	+3	July 21, 2023		1.000
Zambia	1	1	0	0	3	0	+3	July 25, 2024		1.000

== Honors ==
=== Major competitions ===
- World Cup

Champions (4): 1991, 1999, 2015, 2019
Runners-up: 2011
Third place (3): 1995, 2003, 2007

- Olympic Games

Gold medalists (5): 1996, 2004, 2008, 2012, 2024
Silver medalists: 2000
Bronze medalists: 2020

- CONCACAF W Championship

Champions (9): 1991, 1993, 1994, 2000, 2002, 2006, 2014, 2018, 2022
Third place: 2010

- CONCACAF W Gold Cup

Champions: 2024

=== Continental ===
- CONCACAF Women's Olympic Qualifying Tournament

Champions (5): 2004, 2008, 2012, 2016, 2020

=== Friendly ===
- Algarve Cup

Champions (10): 2000, 2003, 2004, 2005, 2007, 2008, 2010, 2011, 2013, 2015

- U.S. Cup

Champions (7): 1995, 1996, 1997, 1998, 1999, 2000, 2002

- Four Nations Tournament

Champions (7): 1998, 2003, 2004, 2006, 2007, 2008, 2011

- Peace Queen Cup

Champions (2): 2006, 2008

- Albena Cup

Champions: 1991

- SheBelieves Cup

Champions (8): 2016, 2018, 2020, 2021, 2022, 2023, 2024, 2026

- Tournament of Nations

Champions: 2018

- DFB Centenary Tournament

Champions: 2000

- Pacific Cup

Champions: 2000

- Brazil Cup

Champions: 1996

- North America Cup

Champions: 1990

- Canada Cup

Champions: 1990

- Australia Cup

Champions: 2000

- Tournoi International

Champions: 1995

- Chiquita Cup

Champions: 1994

- Tri-Nations Tournament

Champions: 1994

- Goodwill Games

Champions: 1998

- Columbus Cup

Champions: 1993

== FIFA World Ranking ==
View source data.
A line chart depicting the history of the U.S.'s year-end placements in the FIFA World Rankings.

Last update was on December 31, 2025

Best Ranking Worst Ranking Best Mover Worst Mover

United States' FIFA World Ranking history
Year	Rank at year end	Best		Worst	
Year	Rank at year end	Rank	Move	Rank	Move
2003	2	1	Steady	2	▼1
2004	2	2	Steady	2	Steady
2005	2	1	▲1	2	▼1
2006	2	2	Steady	2	Steady
2007	2	1	▲1	2	▼1
2008	1	1	▲1	1	Steady
2009	1	1	Steady	1	Steady
2010	1	1	Steady	1	Steady
2011	1	1	Steady	1	Steady
2012	1	1	Steady	1	Steady
2013	1	1	Steady	1	Steady
2014	2	1	Steady	2	▼1
2015	1	1	▲1	2	Steady
2016	1	1	Steady	1	Steady
2017	1	1	▲1	2	▼1
2018	1	1	Steady	1	Steady
2019	1	1	Steady	1	Steady
2020	1	1	Steady	1	Steady
2021	1	1	Steady	1	Steady
2022	1	1	Steady	1	Steady
2023	2	1	Steady	3	▼2
2024	1	1	▲4	5	▼2
2025	2	1	Steady	2	▼1

== See also ==
- Dare to Dream: The Story of the U.S. Women's Soccer Team – 2005 HBO documentary
- List of United States women's national soccer team hat-tricks
- U.S. Women's National Team Players Association
- U.S. women's national soccer team pay discrimination claim
- USWNT All-Time Best XI
- National Women's Soccer League (NWSL), 2013–present
- Soccer in the United States
- United States men's national soccer team

Sporting positions
Preceded by Inaugural champions	FIFA Women's World Cup champions 1991 (first title)	Succeeded by 1995 Norway
Preceded by 1995 Norway	FIFA Women's World Cup champions 1999 (second title)	Succeeded by 2003 Germany
Preceded by 2011 Japan	FIFA Women's World Cup champions 2015 (third title); 2019 (fourth title)	Succeeded by 2023 Spain
Preceded by Inaugural champions	Olympic champions 1996 (first title)	Succeeded by 2000 Norway
Preceded by 2000 Norway	Olympic champions 2004 (second title); 2008 (third title); 2012 (fourth title)	Succeeded by 2016 Germany
Preceded by 2020 Canada	Olympic champions 2024 (fifth title)	Succeeded by Incumbent
Preceded by Inaugural champions	CONCACAF Women's champions 1991 (first title); 1993 (second title); 1994 (third title)	Succeeded by 1998 Canada
Preceded by 1998 Canada; As CONCACAF champions	CONCACAF Women's Gold Cup champions 2000 (fourth title); 2002 (fifth title); 2006 (sixth title)	Succeeded by 2010 Canada
Preceded by 2010 Canada; As CONCACAF Gold Cup champions	CONCACAF Women's champions 2014 (seventh title); 2018 (eighth title)	Succeeded by Incumbent
Preceded by Incumbent; As CONCACAF champions	CONCACAF W champions 2022 (ninth title)	Succeeded by Incumbent
Preceded by Inaugural champions	CONCACAF W Gold Cup champions 2024 (first title)	Succeeded by Incumbent
