= 2017 Tournament of Nations =

Tournament details
- Host country: United States
- Dates: July 27 – August 3, 2017
- Teams: 4 (from 3 confederations)
- Venue(s): 3 (in 3 host cities)

Final positions
- Champions: Australia (1st title)
- Runners-up: United States
- Third place: Japan
- Fourth place: Brazil

Tournament statistics
- Matches played: 6
- Goals scored: 26 (4.33 per match)
- Attendance: 91,275 (15,213 per match)
- Top scorer(s): (Australia) Sam Kerr (4 goals)

The 2017 Tournament of Nations was the inaugural Tournament of Nations, an international women's football tournament, consisting of a series of friendly games. It was held in the United States, from July 27 to August 3, 2017, and featured four teams.

== Format ==
The tournament featured the national teams of Australia, Brazil, Japan, and the hosts, the United States, competing in a round-robin format, with each team playing every other once. Three points are awarded for a win, one for a draw, and none for a loss. Current FIFA Ranking is important, as it is one of the tie-breaking criteria.

Country	June 2017 FIFA Ranking	Best World Cup Finish	Best Olympic Games Finish
Australia	7	Quarter–finals (2007, 2011, 2015)	Quarter–finals (2004, 2016)
Brazil	8	Runners–up (2007)	Runners–up (2004, 2008)
Japan	6	Champions (2011)	Runners–up (2012)
United States	1	Champions (1991, 1999, 2015)	Champions (1996, 2004, 2008, 2012)

== Venues ==
Three cities along the west coast served as the venues for the tournament.

Seattle	San Diego	Carson
CenturyLink Field	Qualcomm Stadium	StubHub Center
Capacity: 38,300	Capacity: 54,000	Capacity: 30,510
2017 Tournament of Nations is located in USA West

== Matches ==
Pos	Team	Pld	W	D	L	GF	GA	GD	Pts
1	Australia (C)	3	3	0	0	11	3	+8	9
2	United States (H)	3	2	0	1	7	4	+3	6
3	Japan	3	0	1	2	3	8	−5	1
4	Brazil	3	0	1	2	5	11	−6	1

Rules for classification: 1) Points; 2) Goal difference; 3) Goals scored; 4) Head-to-head; 5) FIFA Ranking
(C) Champions; (H) Hosts

All times are local PDT (UTC−7).

July 27, 2017
16:15

Brazil	1–1	Japan
Camila 87'	Report	Momiki 63'

CenturyLink Field, Seattle, Washington
Attendance: 9,725
Referee: Karen Abt (United States)
July 27, 2017
19:00

United States	0–1	Australia
	Report	Butt 67'

CenturyLink Field, Seattle, Washington
Attendance: 15,748
Referee: Marie-Soleil Beaudoin (Canada)
July 30, 2017
14:15

Japan	2–4	Australia
Tanaka 5'; Momiki 90+2'	Report	Kerr 10', 14', 43'; Van Egmond 62' (pen.)

Qualcomm Stadium, San Diego, California
Attendance: 9,597
Referee: Katja Koroleva (United States)
July 30, 2017
17:00

United States	4–3	Brazil
Mewis 18'; Press 80'; Rapinoe 85'; Ertz 89'	Report	Andressa 2', 78'; Bruna Benites 63'

Qualcomm Stadium, San Diego, California
Attendance: 21,096
Referee: Melissa Borjas (Honduras)
August 3, 2017
16:15

Australia	6–1	Brazil
De Vanna 7', 34'; Foord 32', 68'; Gorry 41'; Kerr 81'	Report	Camila 2'

StubHub Center, Carson, California
Attendance: 11,948
Referee: Christina Unkel (United States)
August 3, 2017
19:00

United States	3–0	Japan
Rapinoe 12'; Pugh 60'; Morgan 80'	Report

StubHub Center, Carson, California
Attendance: 23,161
Referee: Carol-Ann Chenard (Canada)

2017 Tournament of Nations winners

Australia
1st title

== Goalscorers ==
26 goals were scored in 6 matches, for an average of 4.33 goals per matches.

4 goals

- (Australia) Sam Kerr

2 goals

- (Australia) Lisa De Vanna
- (Australia) Caitlin Foord
- (Brazil) Andressa
- (Brazil) Camila
- (Japan) Yuka Momiki
- (United States) Megan Rapinoe

1 goal

- (Australia) Tameka Butt
- (Australia) Emily van Egmond
- (Australia) Katrina Gorry
- (Brazil) Bruna Benites
- (Japan) Mina Tanaka
- (United States) Julie Ertz
- (United States) Sam Mewis
- (United States) Alex Morgan
- (United States) Christen Press
- (United States) Mallory Pugh

== Television coverage ==
The ESPN family of networks carried all tournament games. Games were shown on ESPN, ESPN2, and ESPN3.
