= 2025–26 HB Køge (women) season =

HB Køge
2025–26 season
- Owner: Ballard Capital
- Manager: Kristian Mørch
- Stadium: Køge Stadium
- A-Liga: 1st
- Danish Cup: Winners
- Top goalscorer: League: Nadia Nadim (11); All: Nadia Nadim (12)
- Biggest win: 17–0 v. OKS (A); Danish Cup, 23 September 2025
- Biggest defeat: 1–2 v. Fortuna Hjørring (A); A-Liga, 22 November 2025
Home colours	Away colours
- All statistics correct as of 14 May 2026.

The 2025–26 season is the 7th season in the history of HB Køge, and the club's 6th consecutive season in the A-Liga. In addition to the domestic league, the club will also participate in the Danish Cup.

== First team squad ==
Players' ages are as of the opening day of the 2025–26 season.

No.	Player	Nationality	Position	Date of birth (age)	Signed from	Signed in	Contract ends	Notes
Goalkeepers
1	Alberte Vingum	(Denmark)	GK	14 November 2004 (aged 20)	OB Q	2021	2028	
16	Ema Aleksić	(Serbia)	GK	10 October 2005 (aged 19)	SFK 2000	2025		
30	Emilie Møller	(Denmark)	GK	23 February 2006 (aged 19)		2021		
Defenders
2	Maria Uhre	(Denmark)	CB	5 October 1999 (aged 25)		2018	2031	
5	Fleur Huisman	(Netherlands)	CB	7 October 2005 (aged 19)	AFC Ajax	2024		
12	Sarah Thygesen	(Denmark)	CB	5 November 2003 (aged 21)	Kolding IF	2024		
15	Ida Jørgensen	(Denmark)	CB	3 March 2005 (aged 20)	OB Q	2026		
18	Avani Brandt	(United States)	CB	23 August 2003 (aged 21)	Unattached	2025		
19	Signe Markvardsen	(Denmark)	LB	6 April 2003 (aged 22)	Brøndby IF	2021		
20	Andrea Friis	(Denmark)	CB	8 March 2006 (aged 19)	Brøndby	2026		
24	Silje Simonsen	(Denmark)	CB	16 January 2000 (aged 25)	Brøndby IF	2024		
28	Simone Boye	(Denmark)	CB	3 March 1992 (aged 33)	Hammarby IF	2026		
29	Skylar Briggs	(United States)	CB / DM	7 November 2001 (aged 23)	California Golden Bears	2025		
Midfielders
6	Lisa Stengs	(Netherlands)	CM	17 August 2005 (aged 19)	AFC Ajax	2024		
7	Emma Pelkowski	(United States)	CM	20 June 2003 (aged 22)	Virginia Tech Hokies	2025	2026	
13	Catherine Paulson	(United States)	CM	4 November 2001 (aged 23)	Bay FC	2026		
14	Emilia Pelgander	(Sweden)	CM	3 March 2004 (aged 21)	Leicester City	2026		
21	Vibeke Andersen	(Denmark)	CM	25 March 2003 (aged 22)	FC Thy-Thisted Q	2024		Loaned to Fortuna Hjørring
23	Mille Gejl	(Denmark)	CM	23 September 1999 (aged 25)	Crystal Palace	2025		
Attackers
3	Macy Schultz	(United States)	FW	28 December 2000 (aged 24)	Northern Colorado Rain FC	2025		
8	Mai Wendicke	(Denmark)	FW	15 July 2006 (aged 19)	Kolding	2026		
9	Nadia Nadim	(Denmark)	ST	2 January 1988 (aged 37)	AC Milan	2025	2026	
11	Cassandra Korhonen	(Sweden)	FW	1 January 1998 (aged 27)	Servette FC	2025		
17	Rikke Madsen	(Denmark)	ST	9 August 1997 (aged 28)	Everton	2025		
25	Augusta Callesen	(Denmark)	FW	24 March 2006 (aged 19)		2022		
26	Flora Marta Lacho	(Angola)	ST	16 March 1999 (aged 26)	Kansas City Current	2025	2026	On loan from Kansas City Current
33	Jereko	(Kenya)	FW	4 September 1997 (aged 27)	Kansas City Current	2025	2027	
–	Rebekah Winther	(Denmark)	ST	30 April 2002 (aged 23)	B.93	2024		Loaned to OB Q
–	Emelía Oskarsdottír	(Iceland)	FW	5 March 2006 (aged 19)	Kristianstads DFF	2024		Loaned to Copenhagen
–	Samantha Williams	(United States)	ST / W	4 December 2001 (aged 23)	Kansas City Current II	2025		
Players who left the club mid-season
~~8~~	Linda Nyman	(Finland)	CB	21 January 1994 (aged 31)	Åland United	2025		Transferred to FK Haugesund
10	Olivia Garcia	(United States)	FW	4 September 2003 (aged 21)	Florida State Seminoles	2024	2025	Free agent
27	Emilie Holt	(Denmark)	CM	27 January 2007 (aged 18)	FC Nordsjælland	2023		Transferred to Brøndby
~~33~~	Tinaya Alexander	(England)	RW	15 April 1999 (aged 26)	London City Lionesses	2025		Free agent

== Transfers ==
=== Transfers in ===
Date	Position	Nationality	Player	From	Fee	Ref.
9 July 2025	FW	(Sweden)	Cassandra Korhonen	(Switzerland) Servette FC	Undisclosed	
14 July 2025	ST	(United States)	Macy Schultz	(United States) Northern Colorado Rain FC	Undisclosed	
15 July 2025	CB	(United States)	Avani Brandt	Free agent	Undisclosed	
16 July 2025	CB / DM	(United States)	Skylar Briggs	(United States) California Golden Bears	Undisclosed	
17 July 2025	CB	(United States)	Courtney Ruedt	Free agent	Undisclosed	
22 July 2025	CM	(Denmark)	Mille Gejl	(England) Crystal Palace	Undisclosed	
22 July 2025	ST	(Denmark)	Rikke Marie Madsen	(England) Everton	Undisclosed	
24 July 2025	ST / W	(United States)	Samantha Williams	(United States) Kansas City Current II	Undisclosed	
28 August 2025	ST	(Denmark)	Nadia Nadim	(Italy) AC Milan	Undisclosed	
13 November 2025	FW	(Kenya)	Jereko	(United States) Kansas City Current	Undisclosed	
21 December 2025	CB	(Denmark)	Andrea Friis	(Denmark) Brøndby	Undisclosed	
2 January 2026	CB	(Denmark)	Ida Jørgensen	(Denmark) OB Q	Undisclosed	
4 January 2026	ST	(Denmark)	Mai Wendicke	(Denmark) Kolding	Undisclosed (Note: Kolding's statement on the sale refers to the transfer as the club's record sale, however the fee is not noted.)	
5 January 2026	CB	(Denmark)	Simone Boye	(Sweden) Hammarby	Undisclosed	
8 January 2026	CM	(Sweden)	Emilia Pelgander	(England) Leicester City	Undisclosed	
19 March 2026	CM	(United States)	Catherine Paulson	(United States) Bay FC	Undisclosed	

=== Loans in ===
Date	Position	Nationality	Player	From	Date until	Ref.
18 July 2025	FW	(Kenya)	Jereko	(United States) Kansas City Current	31 December 2025	
21 August 2025	ST	(Angola)	Flora Marta Lacho	(United States) Kansas City Current	End of season	

=== Loans out ===
Date	Position	Nationality	Player	To	Date until	Ref.
2 September 2025	ST	(Denmark)	Rebekah Winther	(Denmark) OB Q	30 June 2026	
2 February 2026	FW	(Iceland)	Emelía Oskarsdottír	(Denmark) Copenhagen	30 June 2026	
3 February 2026	CM	(Denmark)	Vibeke Andersen	(Denmark) Fortuna Hjørring	30 June 2026	
6 March 2026		(United States)	Kyra Carusa	(United States) Kansas City Current	30 June 2026	

=== Transfers out ===
Date	Position	Nationality	Player	To	Fee	Ref.
30 July 2025	CB	(Denmark)	Selma Svendsen	(Sweden) Djurgårdens	Undisclosed	
2 September 2025	GK	(Belgium)	Teagan Fleming-Hübertz	Free agent	Released	
2 September 2025	CM	(Finland)	Eevi Sutela	Free agent	Released	
20 September 2025	RW	(England)	Tinaya Alexander	Free agent	Released	
29 December 2025	FW	(United States)	Olivia Garcia	Free agent	Released	
19 January 2026	CM	(Denmark)	Emilie Holt	(Denmark) Brøndby	Undisclosed	
29 January 2026	CB	(United States)	Courtney Ruedt	Free agent	Released	
3 February 2026	CB	(Finland)	Linda Nyman	(Norway) FK Haugesund	Undisclosed	

== Competitions ==
=== Overall record ===
Competition	First match	Last match	Starting round	Record							
Competition	First match	Last match	Starting round	Pld	W	D	L	GF	GA	GD	Win %
A-Liga	August 2025	June 2026	Matchday 1	21	13	5	3	43	21	+22	61.90
Danish Cup	September 2025	May 2026	Second round	5	4	1	0	32	2	+30	80.00
Total				26	17	6	3	75	23	+52	65.38

Last updated: 10 May 2026
Source: FotMob

=== A-Liga ===
==== League table ====
Pos	Team	Pld	W	D	L	GF	GA	GD	Pts	Qualification
1	HB Køge	14	10	2	2	33	15	+18	32	Championship play-offs
2	Fortuna Hjørring	14	8	5	1	28	8	+20	29	Championship play-offs
3	Brøndby	14	6	6	2	21	11	+10	24	Championship play-offs
4	AGF	14	7	3	4	22	16	+6	24	Championship play-offs
5	Nordsjælland	14	5	6	3	27	15	+12	21	Championship play-offs

Source: Danish Football Association (in Danish)
Rules for classification: 1) Points; 2) Goal difference; 3) Goals scored; 4) Away goals scored; 5) Play-off (played on neutral ground if determining teams for different rounds); 6) Draw.

==== Championship table ====
Pos	Team	Pld	W	D	L	GF	GA	GD	Pts	Qualification
1	HB Køge (C)	10	6	3	1	50	22	+28	53	Champions League second qualifying round
2	Brøndby	10	8	2	0	39	16	+23	50	Champions League second qualifying round
3	Fortuna Hjørring	10	4	0	6	37	21	+16	41	Europa Cup first qualifying round
4	Nordsjælland	10	4	4	2	47	26	+21	37	
5	AGF	10	0	2	8	26	34	−8	26	

Source: Danish Football Association (in Danish)
Rules for classification: 1) Points; 2) Goal difference; 3) Goals scored; 4) Away goals scored; 5) Play-off (played on neutral ground if determining teams for different rounds); 6) Draw.
(C) Champions

==== Results summary ====
Overall								Home						Away					
Pld	W	D	L	GF	GA	GD	Pts	W	D	L	GF	GA	GD	W	D	L	GF	GA	GD
21	13	5	3	43	21	+22	44	6	2	2	24	13	+11	7	3	1	19	8	+11

Last updated: 14 May 2026.
Source: FotMob

==== Results by round ====
Round	1	2	3	4	5	6	7	8	9	10	11	12	13	14	15	16	17	18	19	20	21	22	23	24
Ground	H	A	H	A	A	H	A	H	A	H	H	A	H	A	H	A	A	H	A	A	H	H	A	H
Result	W	W	W	W	W	L	W	W	W	W	W	D	D	L	D	D	W	W	W	D	L			
Position	2	1	1	1	1	1	1	1	1	1	1	1	1	1			1	1	1	1	1			
Points	3	6	9	12	15	15	18	21	24	27	30	31	32	32	33	34	37	40	43	44	44			

Updated to match(es) played on 9 May 2026. Source: Danish Football Association (in Danish)
A = Away; H = Home; W = Win; D = Draw; L = Loss; P = Postponed

==== Matches ====
12 August 2025 1	HB Køge	3–1	OB Q	Køge
19:00 UTC+2	Gejl 6', 45'; Schultz 76'	Report	Krog 32'	Stadium: Køge Stadium; Referee: Frida Klarlund

16 August 2025 2	FC Midtjylland	0–2	HB Køge	Herning
14:00 UTC+2		Report	Korhonen 69'; Thygesen 84'	Stadium: MCH Arena; Referee: Jonas Bøgelund

23 August 2025 3	HB Køge	3–2	Brøndby IF	Køge
16:00 UTC+2	Gejl 35'; Thygesen 90'; Garcia 90+5'	Report	Rasmussen 10'; Halldórsdóttir 81'	Stadium: Køge Stadium

=== Danish Cup ===
HB Køge entered the competition in the second round.

Win Draw Loss Fixtures

23 September 2025 Second round	OKS	0–17	HB Køge	Odense
17:30 UTC+2		Report	Holt 4', 50'; Callesen 11'; Óskarsdottír 17', 19', 40'; Bagger 17', 28', 41'; Blinge Hansen 22', 47', 63'; Thygesen 43'; Alma Hansen 74', 77', 85', 88'	Stadium: OKSON-Park; Referee: Lucas Gejbøl

5 November 2025 Third round	Copenhagen	0–6	HB Køge	Vanløse
18:30 UTC+2		Report	Lacho 25', 83', 85'; Oskarsdottír 54', 74', 80'	Stadium: Vanløse Idrætspark; Referee: Magnus Tækker Lærke

6 December 2025 Quarter-final	HB Køge	2-0	AGF	Køge
14:00 UTC+1	Jereko 16'; Nadim 69'	Report		Stadium: Capelli Sports Stadium; Referee: Zascha A. Sparving

26 March 2026 Semi-final first leg	HB Køge	1-1	Brøndby IF	Køge
17:00 UTC+2	Boye 11'	Report	Borbye 15'	Stadium: Capelli Sports Stadium; Referee: Julie Alsbro Thomsen

2 April 2026 Semi-final second leg	Brøndby IF	1-4 (1-5 agg.)	HB Køge	Brøndby
15:00 UTC+2	Buchberg 84'	Report	C. Paulson 2'; Gejl 20'; Schultz 47'; Thygesen 80'	Stadium: 1964 Park; Referee: Philip Warburg

16 May 2026 Final	HB Køge	4-1	Nordsjælland	Køge
15:00 UTC+2	Schultz 3', 25'; Thygesen 77'; Wendicke 90+5'	Report	Højer 79' (pen.)	Stadium: Capelli Sports Stadium; Attendance: 2,055; Referee: Nanna Løf Mørch Andersen

=== UEFA Women's Europa Cup ===
==== Qualifying ====
10 September 2025 First round (1st leg)	HB Køge	3–2	(Romania) Farul Constanța	Køge
16:00 UTC+2	Gejl 1'; Pelkowski 57'; Luplau 90+1'	Report	Botojel 11' (pen.); Pînzariu 61'	Stadium: Køge Stadium; Attendance: 548; Referee: Eszter Urban (Hungary)

17 September 2025 First round (2nd leg)	(Romania) Farul Constanța	0–3	HB Køge	Ovidiu
15:00 UTC+3		Report	Madsen 2'; Jereko 53'; Luplau 63'	Stadium: Central Stadium Hagi Academy; Attendance: 426; Referee: Eleni Antoniou (Greece)

8 October 2025 Second round (1st leg)	HB Køge	2–1	(Scotland) Glasgow City	Køge
18:30 UTC+2	Gejl 32'; Garcia 60'	Report	Anderson 41'	Stadium: Køge Stadium; Attendance: 675; Referee: Riem Hussein (Germany)

15 October 2025 Second round (2nd leg)	(Scotland) Glasgow City	5–3	HB Køge	Glasgow
19:35 UTC+1	Harrison 10'; Whelan 25'; Pelkowski 64' (o.g.); Brownlie 90'; Forrest 90+2'	Report	Gejl 3'; Nadim 27'; Thygesen 84'	Stadium: Petershill Park; Attendance: 507; Referee: Maïka Vanderstichel (France)

== Statistics ==
=== Appearances and goals ===
As of match played 9 May 2026

The number in parentheses denotes an appearance where the player is brought on as a substitute.

No.	Pos.	Nat.	Player	League		Cup		Total	
No.	Pos.	Nat.	Player	Apps	Goals	Apps	Goals	Apps	Goals
1	GK	(Denmark)	Alberte Vingum	10	0	4	0	14	0
2	CB	(Denmark)	Maria Uhre	9 (6)	2	4 (1)	0	13 (7)	2
3	W	(United States)	Macy Schultz	15 (4)	1	3 (1)	1	18 (5)	2
4	CB	(United States)	Courtney Ruedt	6 (1)	0	0 (2)	0	6 (3)	0
5	CB	(Netherlands)	Fleur Huisman	5 (2)	0	0 (2)	0	5 (4)	0
6	CM	(Netherlands)	Lisa Stengs	1	0	0	0	1	0
7	CM	(United States)	Emma Pelkowski	4 (13)	0	4	0	8 (13)	0
8	ST	(Denmark)	Mai Wendicke	2 (4)	0	0 (2)	0	2 (6)	0
9	ST	(Denmark)	Nadia Nadim	11 (1)	11	2	1	13 (1)	12
10	FW	(United States)	Olivia Garcia	10 (4)	2	1 (1)	0	11 (5)	2
11	FW	(Sweden)	Cassandra Korhonen	17 (2)	5	3 (1)	0	20 (3)	5
12	CB	(Denmark)	Sarah Thygesen	5 (14)	4	2 (2)	2	7 (16)	6
13	CM	(United States)	Catherine Paulson	3 (2)	0	2	1	5 (2)	1
14	CM	(Sweden)	Emilia Pelgander	5 (1)	1	2	0	7 (1)	1
15	CB	(Denmark)	Ida Jørgensen	4	2	1	0	5	2
16	GK	(Serbia)	Ema Aleksić	6 (1)	0	0	0	6 (1)	0
17	RW	(Denmark)	Rikke Madsen	18 (2)	5	1 (2)	0	19 (4)	5
18	CB	(United States)	Avani Brandt	14 (1)	0	2	0	16 (1)	0
19	LB	(Denmark)	Signe Markvardsen	18 (1)	0	4	0	22 (1)	0
21	CM	(Denmark)	Vibeke Andersen	0	0	0	0	0	0
22	FW	(Iceland)	Emelía Oskarsdottír	6	1	1 (2)	6	7 (2)	7
23	CM	(Denmark)	Mille Gejl	20	8	2 (2)	1	22 (2)	9
24	CB	(Denmark)	Silje Simonsen	1	0	0	0	1	0
25	FW	(Denmark)	Augusta Callesen	5 (9)	0	4 (1)	1	9 (10)	1
27	CM	(Denmark)	Emilie Holt	2 (6)	0	1 (1)	2	3 (7)	2
28	CB	(Denmark)	Simone Boye	6	0	2	1	8	1
29	CB / DM	(United States)	Skylar Briggs	2 (3)	0	0 (1)	0	2 (4)	0
30	GK	(Denmark)	Emilie Møller	4	0	1	0	5	0
33	FW	(Kenya)	Jereko	13 (3)	0	5	1	18 (3)	1
–	RW	(England)	Tinaya Alexander	0	0	0	0	0	0
	CB	(Finland)	Linda Nyman	1	0	0	0	1	0
–	ST / W	(United States)	Samantha Williams	0	0	0	0	0	0
–	ST	(Denmark)	Rebeka Winther	1	0	0	0	1	0
–	CM	(Denmark)	Maise Bagger	0	0	1	3	1	3
–	CB	(Denmark)	Anna Billing	0	0	0 (1)	0	0 (1)	0
–	FW	(Denmark)	Rose Blinge	0	0	1	3	1	3
–		(Denmark)	Wilma Boeck	0	0	0 (1)	0	0 (1)	0
–	FW	(Denmark)	Alma Hansen	0	0	0 (1)	4	0 (1)	4
–	CB	(Denmark)	Laura Sehested	0	0	1	0	1	0
Players loaned in during the season
26	ST	(Angola)	Flora Marta Lacho	5 (2)	1	1	3	6 (2)	4

Sources: HB Køge fixtures — FotMob, FBref

=== Goalscorers ===
As of match played 9 May 2026

No.	Pos.	Nat.	Player	AL	DC	Total
9	FW	(Denmark)	Nadia Nadim	11	1	12
23	MF	(Denmark)	Mille Gejl	8	1	9
22	FW	(Iceland)	Emelía Oskarsdottír	1	6	7
12	CB	(Denmark)	Sarah Thygesen	4	2	6
11	CB	(Sweden)	Cassandra Korhonen	5	0	5
17	FW	(Denmark)	Rikke Madsen	5	0	5
26	FW	(Angola)	Flora Marta Lacho	1	3	4
–	FW	(Denmark)	Alma Hansen	0	4	4
–	MF	(Denmark)	Maise Bagger	0	3	3
–	FW	(Denmark)	Rose Blinge	0	3	3
15	DF	(Denmark)	Ida Jørgensen	2	0	2
10	FW	(United States)	Olivia García	2	0	2
2	DF	(Denmark)	Maria Uhre	2	0	2
3	FW	(United States)	Macy Schultz	1	1	2
27	MF	(Denmark)	Emilie Holt	0	2	2
14	MF	(Sweden)	Emilia Pelgander	1	0	1
28	DF	(Denmark)	Simone Boye	0	1	1
25	FW	(Denmark)	Augusta Callesen	0	1	1
33	FW	(Kenya)	Jereko	0	1	1
13	MF	(United States)	Catherine Paulson	0	1	1
Total				43	30	73

Source: FBREF

== Sources ==
- HB Køge A-Liga - Danish Football Association
- Kvindepokalen 2025/26 – Danish Football Association
- HB Køge - FotMob
