= 2002 WUSA draft =

Women's soccer draft

The 2002 WUSA college draft took place on February 11, 2002. It was the second college draft held by Women's United Soccer Association (WUSA) to assign the rights of college players to the WUSA teams.

== Round 1 ==
Pick	Player	Pos.	WUSA team	Previous team
1	Danielle Slaton	DF	Carolina Courage	Santa Clara
2	Abby Wambach	FW	Washington Freedom	Univ. of Florida
3	Jena Kluegel	MF	Boston Breakers	North Carolina
4	Lori Lindsey	MF	San Diego Spirit	Virginia
5	Stacey Tullock	MF	Philadelphia Charge	Arizona State
6	Minna Mustonen	FW	New York Power	Franklin Pierce College
7	Anna Kraus	DF	Atlanta Beat	Santa Clara
8	Danielle Borgman	DF	San Jose CyberRays	North Carolina

== Round 2 ==
Pick	Player	Pos.	WUSA team	Previous team
1	Katie Barnes	FW	Carolina Courage	West Virginia Mountaineers
2	Casey Zimny	DF	Washington Freedom	Univ. of Connecticut
3	Mónica González	DF	Boston Breakers	Notre Dame
4	Amy Sauer	DF	San Diego Spirit	Stanford
5	Mary-Frances Monroe	MF	Philadelphia Charge	UCLA
6	Bonnie Young	DF	New York Power	Penn State
7	Meredith Flaherty	GK	New York Power	Univ. of Florida
8	Andrea Alfiler	MF	Philadelphia Charge	Azusa Pacific

1. The Atlanta Beat traded its second round pick (15th overall) to the New York Power for future considerations..

2. The San Jose CyberRays traded its second round pick (16th overall) to the Philadelphia Charge for future considerations.

== Round 3 ==
Pick	Player	Pos.	WUSA team	Previous team
1	Emily Oleksiuk	GK	Carolina Courage	Penn State
2	Stephanie Rigamat	FW	Washington Freedom	UCLA
3	Alexa Borisjuk	MF	Boston Breakers	Univ. of Connecticut
4	Meghan Anderson	MF	Carolina Courage	Nebraska
5	Katie Carson	GK	Philadelphia Charge	Clemson
6	Sarah Kate Noftsinger	MF	New York Power	Wake Forest
7	Nicky Thrasher	FW	Atlanta Beat	Texas A&M
8	Alice Gleason	GK	San Jose CyberRays	UNLV

3. Traded with the San Diego Spirit for 2001 waiver draft selection and fourth round 2002 draft selection.

== Round 4 ==
Pick	Player	Pos.	WUSA team	Previous team
1	Amy Kofoed	FW	San Diego Spirit	Utah
2	Justine Fisher	MF	Washington Freedom	U.S. Naval Academy
3	Kristin Slater	GK	Boston Breakers	Arizona State
4	Shelly Finger	GK	San Diego Spirit	North Carolina
5	Karyn Hall	MF	Philadelphia Charge	Univ. of Florida
6	Erin Gilhart	DF	New York Power	Univ. of Florida
7	Kristin DePlatchett	GK	Atlanta Beat	North Carolina
8	Linnea Quinones	GK	San Jose CyberRays	San Diego State

4. Traded from the Carolina Courage for 2001 waiver draft selection and third round 2002 draft selection.

== See also ==
- List of WUSA drafts
