= 2001 Algarve Cup =

International women's football tournament

Tournament details
- Host country: Portugal
- Dates: 11–17 March 2001
- Teams: 8 (from 3 confederations)

Final positions
- Champions: Sweden (2nd title)
- Runners-up: Denmark
- Third place: China

Tournament statistics
- Matches played: 16
- Goals scored: 63 (3.94 per match)
- Top scorer(s): (Sweden) Hanna Ljungberg (6 goals)

The 2001 Algarve Cup was the eighth edition of the Algarve Cup, an invitational women's association football tournament. It took place between 11 and 17 March 2001 in Portugal with Sweden winning the event defeating Denmark, 3-0, in the final game.

== Format ==
The eight participating teams are same as previous year: Canada, China, Denmark, Finland, Norway, Portugal, Sweden and the United States.

The eight teams were split into two groups that played a round-robin group stage. On completion of this, the fourth placed teams from each group would playoff to determine seventh and eighth place, the third placed teams from each group would play each other to decide fifth and sixth place, the second placed teams in each group would play to determine third and fourth place and the winners of the groups would compete for first and second place.

Points awarded in the group stage are three points for a win, one point for a draw and none for a loss.

== Group A ==
Team	Pts	Pld	W	D	L	GF	GA	GD
Sweden	9	3	3	0	0	11	3	+8
Canada	6	3	2	0	1	7	6	+1
United States	3	3	1	0	2	2	5	−3
Portugal	0	3	0	0	3	2	8	−6

March 11, 2001

Canada	3–0	United States
31' 90' Charmaine Hooper; 37' Christine Sinclair	Report; Report

Lagos

March 11, 2001

Sweden	4–1	Portugal
24' Malin Moström; 40' Hanna Ljungberg; 48' Victoria Svensson; 77' Elin Flyborg	Report; SvFF Report (in Swedish)	2' Maria João Xavier

Lagos

March 13, 2001

United States	2–0	Portugal
65' Christie Welsh; 87' Stephanie Rigamat	Report; Report

Silves

March 13, 2001

Sweden	5–2	Canada
11' 15' 45' Hanna Ljungberg; 13' (own goal); 78' Elin Flyborg	Report; SvFF Report (in Swedish)	35' 75' Christine Sinclair

Silves

March 15, 2001

Sweden	2–0	United States
38' Tina Nordlund; 73' Hanna Ljungberg	Report; SvFF Report (in Swedish)

Albufeira

March 15, 2001

Canada	2–1	Portugal
8' (own goal); 89' Breana Boyd	Report; Report	45' Edite Fernandes

Albufeira

== Group B ==
Team	Pts	Pld	W	D	L	GF	GA	GD
Denmark	6	3	2	0	1	8	2	+6
China	6	3	2	0	1	6	2	+4
Norway	6	3	2	0	1	6	3	+3
Finland	0	3	0	0	3	1	14	−13

March 11, 2001

Denmark	2–1	China
55' Kjældgaard; 84' Gitte Krogh		7' Pu Wei

Montechoro

March 11, 2001

Norway	5–1	Finland
16' 20' Dagny Mellgren; 56' 67' Linda Ørmen; 22' Margunn Haugenes		58' Heidi Kackur

Montechoro

March 13, 2001

Norway	0–2	China
		50' Zhao Lihong; 61' Bai Lili

Olhão

March 13, 2001

Finland	0–6	Denmark
		22' Kjældgaard; 35' 60' Gitte Krogh; 42' Merete Pedersen; 70' Mette Jokumsen; 87' Cathrine Sørensen

Olhão

March 15, 2001

Norway	1–0	Denmark
59' Ragnhild Gulbrandsen

Portimão

March 15, 2001

China	3–0	Finland
27' Liu Ying; 36' Pan Lina; 45' Li Jie

Portimão

== Seventh place ==
March 17, 2001

Finland	3–1	Portugal
36' Jessica Julin; 44' Terhi Uusi-Luomalahti; 78' Hanna Ekstrom	Report	16' Susana Maria Silva Martins

Montechoro

== Fifth place ==
March 17, 2001

Norway	4–3	United States
21' 73' 86' Ragnhild Gulbrandsen; 88' Anne Tønnessen	Report	24' Ally Marquand; 46' Laura Schott; 56' Cat Reddick

Quarteira

== Third place ==
March 17, 2001

China	5–1	Canada
42' 65' Bai Lili; 67' 87' Zhao Lihong; 92' Pu Wei	Report	21' Christine Sinclair

Loulé

== Final ==
March 17, 2001

Sweden	3–0	Denmark
5' Linda Fagerström; 37' Hanna Ljungberg; 74' Malin Moström	SvFF Report (in Swedish)

Loulé

== Final standings ==
Rank	Team
1st place, gold medalist(s)	Sweden
2nd place, silver medalist(s)	Denmark
3rd place, bronze medalist(s)	China
4	Canada
5	Norway
6	United States
7	Finland
8	Portugal

== Champion ==
2001 Algarve Cup

Sweden
Second title

== Goal scorers ==
Goals	Player
6	(Sweden) Hanna Ljungberg
4	(Canada) Christine Sinclair
4	(Norway) Ragnhild Gulbrandsen
3	(China) Bai Lili
3	(China) Zhao Lihong
3	(Denmark) Gitte Krogh
2	(Canada) Charmaine Hooper
2	(China) Pu Wei
2	(Denmark) Nadia Kjældgaard
2	(Norway) Dagny Mellgren
2	(Norway) Linda Ørmen
2	(Sweden) Elin Flyborg
2	(Sweden) Malin Moström
1	24 athletes
2 own goals
