= Marcie Ward =

American soccer player (born 1982)

Personal information
- Full name: Marcella Ward Laderman
- Birth name: Marcella Erin Ward
- Date of birth: February 1, 1982 (age 44)
- Place of birth: Alamo, California, U.S.
- Height: 5 ft 8 in (1.73 m)
- Position: Midfielder

Youth career
- San Ramon Crunch
- –2000: Carondelet Cougars

College career
| Years | Team | Apps | (Gls) |
| 2000–2004 | Stanford Cardinal | 86 | (42) |

International career
- United States U18
- United States U21
| 2001 | United States | 3 | (0) |

Marcella Ward Laderman (born Marcella Erin Ward; February 1, 1982) is an American former soccer player who played as a midfielder, making three appearances for the United States women's national team.

== Career ==
Ward played for the Carondelet Cougars in high school, where she was a Parade and NSCAA High-School All-American. She played club soccer for the San Ramon Crunch, where she won four state cup championships. In college, she played for the Stanford Cardinal from 2000 to 2004, having redshirted during the 2003 season due to injury. She was an NSCAA Second-Team All-American in 2001, and was a Soccer America and Soccer Buzz Freshman All-American in 2000. She was included in the NSCAA All-West Region selection in all four seasons, having been featured in the first team in 2000 and 2001, along with the second team in 2002 and 2004. She was included in the Pac-10 All-Conference First Team in all four seasons, and was the Pac-10 Freshman of the Year in 2000. In total, she scored 42 goals and recorded 40 assists in 86 appearances for Stanford. Her tally of career assists ranks second in school history.

Ward played for the under-18 and under-21 U.S. national teams. She made her international debut for the United States on March 7, 2001 in a friendly match against Italy. In total, she made three appearances for the U.S., earning her final cap on March 13, 2001 in the 2001 Algarve Cup against Portugal.

== Personal life ==
Ward is a native of Alamo, California. She graduated from Stanford University with a degree in public policy, before pursuing a master's degree in communication. She later adopted the surname Laderman.

== Career statistics ==
=== International ===
United States
| Year | Apps | Goals |
|---|---|---|
| 2001 | 3 | 0 |
| Total | 3 | 0 |
