= Stanford Cardinal women's soccer =

Women's association football team of Stanford University

- 2025 Stanford Cardinal women's soccer team
- Founded: 1984; 42 years ago
- University: Stanford University
- Athletic director: John Donahoe
- Head coach: Paul Ratcliffe (23rd season)
- Conference: ACC
- Location: Stanford, California, US
- Stadium: Laird Q. Cagan Stadium (capacity: 2,000)
- Nickname: Cardinal
- Colors: Cardinal and white
Home	Away

NCAA tournament championships
- 2011, 2017, 2019

NCAA tournament runner-up
- 2009, 2010, 2023, 2025

NCAA tournament College Cup
- 1993, 2008, 2009, 2010, 2011, 2012, 2014, 2017, 2018, 2019, 2023, 2024, 2025

NCAA tournament Quarterfinals
- 1991, 1992, 1993, 1994, 2002, 2008, 2009, 2010, 2011, 2012, 2014, 2015, 2017, 2018, 2019, 2023, 2024, 2025

NCAA tournament appearances
- 1990, 1991, 1992, 1993, 1994, 1995, 1996, 1998, 1999, 2000, 2001, 2002, 2003, 2004, 2005, 2006, 2007, 2008, 2009, 2010, 2011, 2012, 2013, 2014, 2015, 2016, 2017, 2018, 2019, 2021, 2022, 2023, 2024, 2025

Conference regular season championships
- 1993, 1995, 1996, 1999, 2002, 2009, 2010, 2011, 2012, 2015, 2016, 2017, 2018, 2019, 2022, 2025

The Stanford Cardinal women's soccer team represents Stanford University in the Atlantic Coast Conference of NCAA Division I soccer. Home games are played at Laird Q. Cagan Stadium, located on the university's campus in Palo Alto. Paul Ratcliffe has coached the Cardinal since 2003, winning Pac-12 Coach of the Year eight times. During his tenure as head coach, the team won the 2011, 2017, and 2019 national championships, and nine Pac-12 titles, played in nine College Cup tournaments, and reached five NCAA Division I tournament finals.

Five Stanford Cardinal players have been awarded the Hermann Trophy, which is awarded annually to the top college soccer player: Kelley O'Hara (2009), Christen Press (2010), Teresa Noyola (2011), Andi Sullivan (2017) and Catarina Macario (2018).

== Players ==
As of February 11, 2026

Note: Flags indicate national team as defined under FIFA eligibility rules; some limited exceptions apply. Players may hold more than one non-FIFA nationality.

No.	Pos.	Nation	Player
0	GK	USA	Alyssa Savig
1	GK	USA	Caroline Birkel
2	DF	USA	Elise Evans
3	FW	USA	Allie Montoya
4	DF	USA	Freya Spiekerkoetter
5	MF	USA	Shae Harvey
6	DF	USA	Sophie Murdock
7	DF	USA	Lizzie Boamah
8	MF	USA	Mia Bhuta
9	FW	USA	Jaden Thomas
10	MF	USA	Charlotte Kohler
11	MF	USA	Eleanor Klinger
12	MF	USA	Jasmine Aikey
13	DF	USA	Sammy Smith

No.	Pos.	Nation	Player
14	DF	USA	Alex Tay
15	DF	USA	Ella Emri
16	MF	USA	Milly Bray
17	FW	USA	Erica Grilione
18	MF	USA	Y-Lan Nguyen
20	FW	USA	Andrea Kitahata
21	MF	USA	Joelle Jung
22	GK	USA	Kaiya Jota
23	MF	USA	Lily Freer
24	FW	USA	Maryn Wolf
25	MF	USA	Noe Johnson
26	FW	USA	Ava Harrison
27	MF	USA	Brooke Holden
28	DF	USA	Logan Smith

== Statistics ==
=== All-time record ===
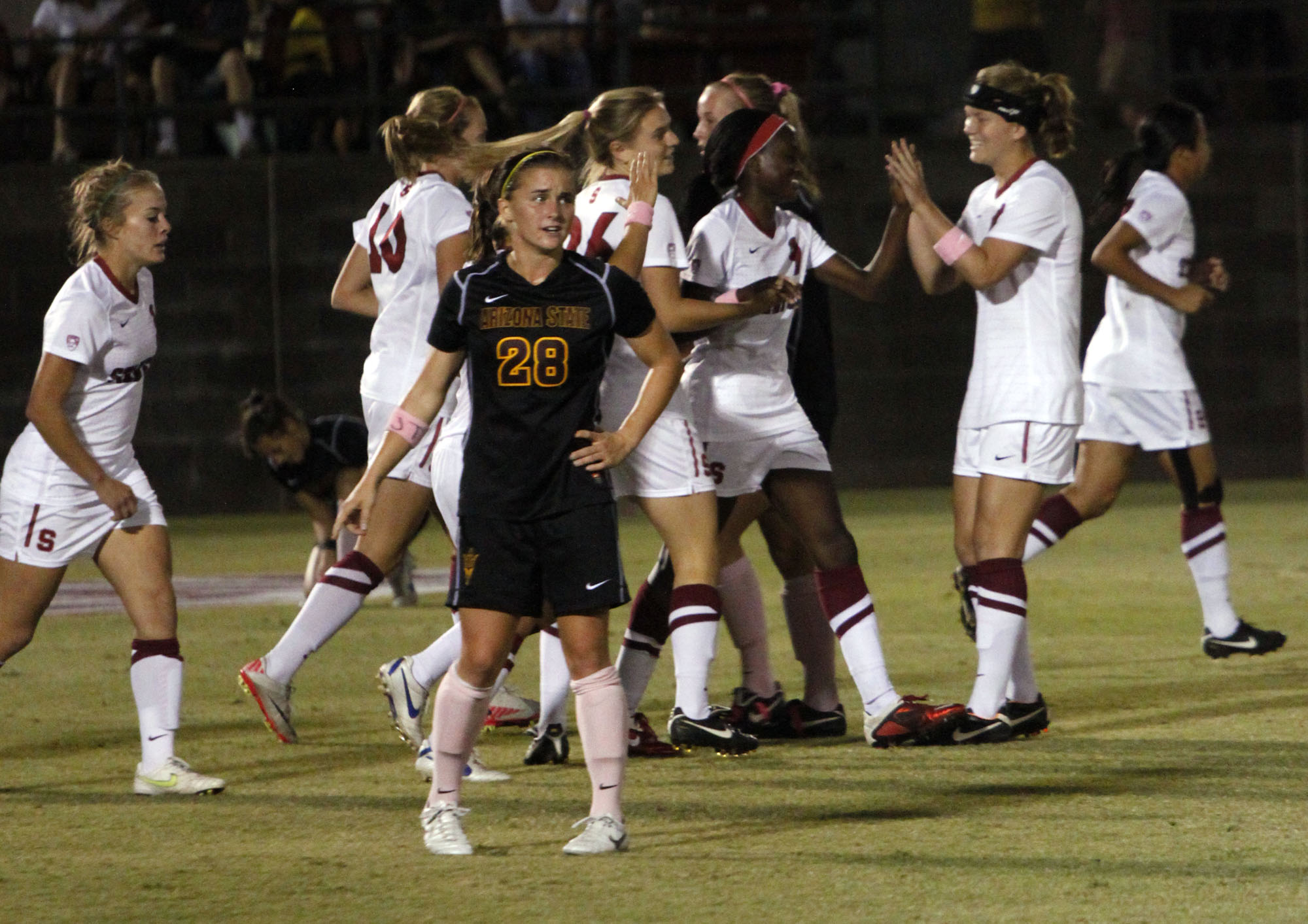
Stanford celebrates after a goal vs Arizona in 2011

Year	Head coach	Overall	Conference	Conference Standing	NCAA Tournament
1984	Helen Keohane	7–7–0			
1985	Helen Keohane	5–12–1			
1986	Helen Keohane	3–12–1			
1987	Berhane Anderberhan	4–10–4			
1988	Berhane Anderberhan	13–4–2			
1989	Berhane Anderberhan	11–5–3			
1990	Berhane Anderberhan	15–3–1			NCAA First Round
1991	Berhane Anderberhan	17–2–0			NCAA Second Round
1992	Berhane Anderberhan	17–2–1			NCAA Second Round
1993	Ian Sawyers	18–2–2	3-1-0	1st	NCAA Semifinals
1994	Ian Sawyers	16–2–2			NCAA Second Round
1995	Ian Sawyers	16–4–0	7-0-0	1st	NCAA First Round
1996	Steve Swanson	12–9–0	6-1-0	1st	NCAA First Round
1997	Steve Swanson	11–7–1	6-2-1	3rd	
1998	Steve Swanson	11–7–2	5-4-0	5th	NCAA First Round
1999	Steve Swanson	15–5–1	7-1-1	1st	NCAA Third Round
2000	Andy Nelson	14–6–1	6-3-0	4th	NCAA Second Round
2001	Andy Nelson	15–4–2	6-2-1	2nd	NCAA Third Round
2002	Stephanie Erickson, Paul Sapsford	21–1–1	9-0-0	1st	NCAA Quarterfinals
2003	Paul Ratcliffe	10–9–2	5-3-1	3rd	NCAA First Round
2004	Paul Ratcliffe	13–6–3	4-3-2	4th	NCAA Second Round
2005	Paul Ratcliffe	10–7–3	4-3-2	4th	NCAA First Round
2006	Paul Ratcliffe	15–6–2	6-2-1	3rd	NCAA Third Round
2007	Paul Ratcliffe	15–3–5	5-1-3	3rd	NCAA Third Round
2008	Paul Ratcliffe	22–2–1	8-1-0	2nd	NCAA College Cup Semifinals
2009	Paul Ratcliffe	25–1–0	9-0-0	1st	NCAA College Cup Runner-up
2010	Paul Ratcliffe	23–1–2	9-0-0	1st	NCAA College Cup Runner-up
2011	Paul Ratcliffe	25–0–1	11-0-0	1st	NCAA College Cup Champion
2012	Paul Ratcliffe	21–2–1	11-0-0	1st	NCAA College Cup Semifinals
2013	Paul Ratcliffe	15–6–1	6-5-0	4th	NCAA Third Round
2014	Paul Ratcliffe	20–2–3	9-1-1	2nd	NCAA Third Round
2015	Paul Ratcliffe	19–2–2	10-0-1	1st	NCAA Quarterfinals
2016	Paul Ratcliffe	18–2–1	10-1-0	1st	NCAA Second Round
2017	Paul Ratcliffe	24-1-0	11-0-0	1st	NCAA College Cup Champion
2018	Paul Ratcliffe	21-1-2	10-0-1	1st	NCAA College Cup Semifinals
2019	Paul Ratcliffe	24-1-0	11-0-0	1st	NCAA College Cup Champion
2020-21	Paul Ratcliffe	6-6-2	5-4-1	4th	
2021	Paul Ratcliffe	13-6-1	7-3-1	4th	NCAA First Round
2022	Paul Ratcliffe	17-2-3	9-1-1	1st	NCAA Second Round
2023	Paul Ratcliffe	20–1–4	8–0–3	2nd	NCAA College Cup Runner-up
2024	Paul Ratcliffe	16–5–2	5–4–1	T-7th	NCAA College Cup Semifinals
2025	Paul Ratcliffe	21–2–2	9–0–1	1st	NCAA College Cup Runner-up
Total		654–176–67 (.766)	246–46–23 (.817)	15 Pac-12 Championships 1 ACC Regular Season Championship 1 ACC Tournament Title	35 NCAA Appearances, 3 National Championships

== School records ==
As of November 17, 2019

=== Career goals ===
Rank	Player	Years	Goals
1	Christen Press	2007–2010	71
2	Catarina Macario	2017–2020	63
3	Sara Rafanelli	1990–1993	59
4	Kelley O'Hara	2006–2009	57
5	Lindsay Taylor	2008–2011	53

=== Career assists ===
Rank	Player	Years	Assists
1	Catarina Macario	2017–2020	47
2	Christen Press	2007–2010	41
3	Marcie Ward	2000–2004	40
3	Teresa Noyola	2008–2011	40
5	Chioma Ubogagu	2011–2014	35

== Award winners ==
As of April 2023

=== Hermann Trophy ===
- 2009: Kelley O'Hara
- 2010: Christen Press
- 2011: Teresa Noyola
- 2017: Andi Sullivan
- 2018: Catarina Macario
- 2019: Catarina Macario

=== Pac-12 Player of the Year ===
- 1995: Carmel Murphy
- 1996: Erin Martin
- 1998: Tracye Lawyer
- 2002: Marcia Wallis
- 2009: Kelley O'Hara
- 2010: Christen Press
- 2011: Lindsay Taylor
- 2016: Andi Sullivan
- 2017: Andi Sullivan

=== NSCAA Player of the Year ===
- 2009: Kelley O'Hara
- 2010: Christen Press
- 2011: Teresa Noyola

=== Soccer America Player of the Year ===
- 1991: Julie Foudy
- 2009: Kelley O'Hara
- 2010: Christen Press
- 2011: Lindsay Taylor

=== Pac-12 Forward of the Year ===
- 2017: Catarina Macario
- 2018: Catarina Macario

=== Pac-12 Midfielder of the Year ===
- 2017: Andi Sullivan
- 2018: Jordan DiBiasi
- 2019: Catarina Macario

=== Pac-12 Goalkeeper of the Year ===
- 2015: Jane Campbell

=== Pac-12 Freshman of the Year ===
- 1999: Marcia Wallis
- 2000: Marcie Ward
- 2007: Christen Press
- 2008: Lindsay Taylor
- 2009: Mariah Nogueira
- 2011: Chioma Ubogagu
- 2014: Andi Sullivan
- 2015: Alana Cook
- 2017: Catarina Macario
- 2022: Elise Evans

=== Pac-12 Coach of the Year ===
- 1995: Ian Sawyers
- 1999: Steve Swanson
- 2001: Andy Nelson
- 2008: Paul Ratcliffe
- 2009: Paul Ratcliffe
- 2010: Paul Ratcliffe
- 2011: Paul Ratcliffe
- 2012: Paul Ratcliffe
- 2015: Paul Ratcliffe
- 2016: Paul Ratcliffe
- 2017: Paul Ratcliffe
- 2018: Paul Ratcliffe

=== NSCAA Coach of the Year ===
- 2008: Paul Ratcliffe
- 2009: Paul Ratcliffe
- 2011: Paul Ratcliffe

=== Pac-12 All-Conference First Team ===
1995

- Kelly Adamson
- Suzie Boots
- Jessica Fischer
- Carmel Murphy

1996

- Suzie Boots
- Elie Foster
- Erin Martin

1997

- Emily Burt
- Ronnie Fair
- Tracye Lawyer

1998

- Ronnie Fair
- Tracye Lawyer

1999

- Ronnie Fair
- Jen O'Sullivan
- Marcia Wallis

2000

- Marcie Ward

2001

- Amy Sauer
- Marcia Wallis
- Marcie Ward

2002

- Nicole Barnhart
- Marcia Wallis
- Marcie Ward
- Callie Withers

2003

- Nicole Barnhart
- Ally Marquand

2004

- Nicole Barnhart
- Leah Tapscott
- Marcie Ward

2005

- Hayley Hunt

2006

- Rachel Buehler
- Kelley O'Hara
- Shari Summers

2007

- Marisa Abegg
- Rachel Buehler
- Kelley O'Hara

2008

- Marisa Abegg
- Teresa Noyola
- Lindsay Taylor

2009

- Mariah Nogueira
- Kelley O'Hara
- Christen Press
- Rachel Quon
- Ali Riley

2010

- Christen Press
- Teresa Noyola
- Rachel Quon
- Lindsay Taylor

2011

- Alina Garciamendez
- Camille Levin
- Teresa Noyola
- Emily Oliver
- Lindsay Taylor

2012

- Alina Garciamendez
- Mariah Nogueira
- Emily Oliver
- Rachel Quon
- Chioma Ubogagu

2013

- Courtney Verloo

2014

- Lo'eau LaBonta
- Andi Sullivan
- Chioma Ubogagu

2015

- Jane Campbell
- Haley Rosen
- Andi Sullivan

2016

- Maddie Bauer
- Jane Campbell
- Andi Sullivan

2017

- Tierna Davidson
- Alana Cook
- Catarina Macario
- Andi Sullivan

2018

- Alana Cook
- Jordan DiBiasi
- Tegan McGrady
- Catarina Macario

2019

- Catarina Macario
- Naomi Girma
- Madison Haley
- Kiki Pickett

2020–21

- Kiki Pickett

2021

- Maya Doms
- Naomi Girma

2022

- Maya Doms
- Elise Evans

=== NSCAA First Team All-Americans ===
1990

- Julie Foudy

1991

- Julie Foudy

1992

- Julie Foudy
- Sarah Rafanelli

1993

- Sarah Rafanelli

1994

- Jessica Fischer

1995

- Jessica Fischer

2002

- Nicole Barnhart
- Marcia Wallis
- Callie Withers

2004

- Nicole Barnhart

2008

- Teresa Noyola
- Lindsay Taylor

2009

- Kelley O'Hara

2010

- Teresa Noyola
- Christen Press

2011

- Camille Levin
- Teresa Noyola
- Lindsay Taylor

2012

- Alina Garciamendez
- Rachel Quon

2015

- Andi Sullivan

2016

- Maddie Bauer
- Andi Sullivan

2017

- Tierna Davidson
- Andi Sullivan
- Catarina Macario

2018

- Alana Cook
- Jordan DiBiasi
- Catarina Macario

2019

- Naomi Girma
- Catarina Macario
- Madison Haley
- Kiki Pickett

2021

- Naomi Girma

== Notable alumni ==
=== Current professional players ===
As of February 11, 2026

- (United States) Nicole Barnhart (2000–2004) – Currently Goalkeeping Coach with Washington Spirit
- (United States) Lo'eau LaBonta (2011–2014) – Currently with Kansas City Current
- (England) Chioma Ubogagu (2011–2014) – Currently with Dallas Trinity FC
- Jane Campbell (2013–2016) – Currently with Houston Dash and United States international
- (Republic of Ireland) Kyra Carusa (2014–2017) – Currently with HB Køge and Ireland international
- (United States) Mariah Lee (2014–2017) – Currently with Vancouver Rise FC
- Andi Sullivan (2014–2017) – Currently with Washington Spirit and United States international
- (United States) Jordan Baggett (2015–2018) – Currently with Denver Summit FC
- (United States) Alana Cook (2015–2018) – Currently with Kansas City Current
- Tierna Davidson (2016–2018) – Currently with Gotham FC and United States international
- (United States) Sam Hiatt (2017–2019) – Currently with Portland Thorns FC
- Catarina Macario (2017–2020) – Currently with Chelsea and United States international
- (United States) Belle Briede (2017–2021) – Currently with SK Slavia Prague
- (United States) Madison Haley (2017–2021) – Currently with Brighton & Hove Albion
- (United States) Kiki Pickett (2017–2021) – Currently with San Diego Wave FC
- Sophia Wilson (2018–2019) – Currently with Portland Thorns FC and United States international
- Naomi Girma (2018–2021) – Currently with Chelsea FC and United States international
- (United States) Sierra Enge (2018–2022) – Currently with RC Strasbourg
- (United States) Madison Ayson (2019–2022) – Currently with Sydney FC
- (United States) Maya Doms (2019–2023) – Currently with Sassuolo
- Kennedy Wesley (2019–2023) – Currently with San Diego Wave FC and United States international
- Amy Sayer (2020–2022) – Currently with Malmö FF and Australia international
- (United States) Ryan Campbell (2020–2023) – Currently with Gotham FC
- (United States) Avani Brandt (2021–2024) – Currently with HB Køge
- (United States) Nya Harrison (2021–2024) – Currently with San Diego Wave FC
- (United States) Samantha Williams (2021–2024) – Currently with HB Køge
- (United States) Andrea Kitahata (2021–2025) – Currently with Gotham FC
- (United States) Jasmine Aikey (2022–2025) – Currently with Denver Summit FC
- (United States) Elise Evans (2022–2025) – Currently with Chicago Stars FC
- (United States) Shae Harvey (2023–2025) – Currently with Portland Thorns FC

=== Other alumni ===
- Julie Foudy: 274 caps with the United States women's national team, team captain from 2000–2004. Two-time World Cup Champion (1991 & 1999). Three-time Olympic Medalist (Gold in 1996 & 2004, Silver in 2000). Inducted in the National Soccer Hall of Fame in 2007. ESPN colour commentator.
- Nicole Barnhart: 54 caps with the United States women's national team. Two-time Olympic Gold Medalist (2008 & 2012). Named to two World Cup squads. Two-time NWSL Champion (2014 & 2015) with FC Kansas City. Named NWSL Goalkeeper of the year in 2013.
- Rachel Van Hollebeke (née Rachel Buehler): Two-time Olympic Gold Medalist (2008 & 2012). Won the Silver Medal at the 2011 World Cup. NWSL Champion in 2013 with the Portland Thorns. Attended Medical school at UC San Diego School of Medicine after retiring from professional soccer.
- Kelley O'Hara: Two-time World Cup Champion (2015 & 2019). 2012 Olympic Gold medalist. Named to the FIFA FIFPro Women’s World11 in 2019.
- Christen Press: Two-time World Cup Champion (2015 & 2019), scored a goal in both tournaments. 2016 Olympian and 2020 Olympic Bronze medalist. Became the first American to win the Damallsvenskan Golden Boot in 2013.
- Ali Riley: Captain of the New Zealand national team and has earned over 100 caps with New Zealand. Played in four World Cup tournaments and three Olympic Games. Three-time Damallsvenskan Champion.
- Tierna Davidson: Selected by the Chicago Red Stars with the first overall pick at the 2019 NWSL College Draft. 2019 World Cup Champion. Was the youngest player named to the United States roster for the 2019 World Cup.
