= Anna Kraus (soccer) =

American soccer player (born 1980)

Personal information
- Full name: Anna R. Lydon
- Birth name: Anna R. Kraus
- Date of birth: July 29, 1980 (age 46)
- Place of birth: Mount Vernon, Washington, U.S.
- Height: 5 ft 4 in (1.63 m)
- Position: Defender

Youth career
- Central Valley Mercury
- –1998: Saint Francis Lancers

College career
Years	Team	Apps	(Gls)
1998–2001	Santa Clara Broncos	89	(2)

Senior career*
Years	Team	Apps	(Gls)
2002	Atlanta Beat	0	(0)
2002–2003	San Diego Spirit	9	(0)

International career
2000–2001	United States	6	(0)
- * Club domestic league appearances and goals

Anna R. Lydon (née Kraus; born July 29, 1980) is an American former soccer player who played as a defender, making six appearances for the United States women's national team.

== Career ==
Kraus played for the Saint Francis Lancers in high school, and was named an NSCAA Youth All-American and the school's Scholar Athlete of the Year in her senior year. She also played club soccer for the Central Valley Mercury, winning three national titles with the team. In college, she played for the Santa Clara Broncos from 1998 to 2001. The team won the school's first NCAA championship in 2001, where she was named to the NCAA All-Tournament Team. She was also included in the All-West Region Second Team in 1998, 1999, and 2001, and was an All-WCC Second-Team Selection in 1999 and 2001. In total, she scored 2 goals and registered 10 assists in her 89 appearances for the Broncos.

Kraus made her international debut for the United States on July 7, 2000, in a friendly match against Italy. In total, she made six appearances for the U.S., earning her final cap on March 17, 2001, in a friendly match against Norway.

In the 2002 WUSA draft, Kraus was selected by the Atlanta Beat before being traded later that year to the San Diego Spirit. She made nine appearances for San Diego during the 2002 WUSA season.

== Personal life ==
Kraus was born in Mount Vernon, Washington, though she grew up in Sunnyvale, California, and attended Saint Francis High School in Mountain View. She married Keith Lydon in Incline Village, Nevada, on April 16, 2016.

== Career statistics ==
=== International ===
United States
Year	Apps	Goals
2000	1	0
2001	5	0
Total	6	0
