= Mary Long (soccer) =

American soccer player (born 2007)

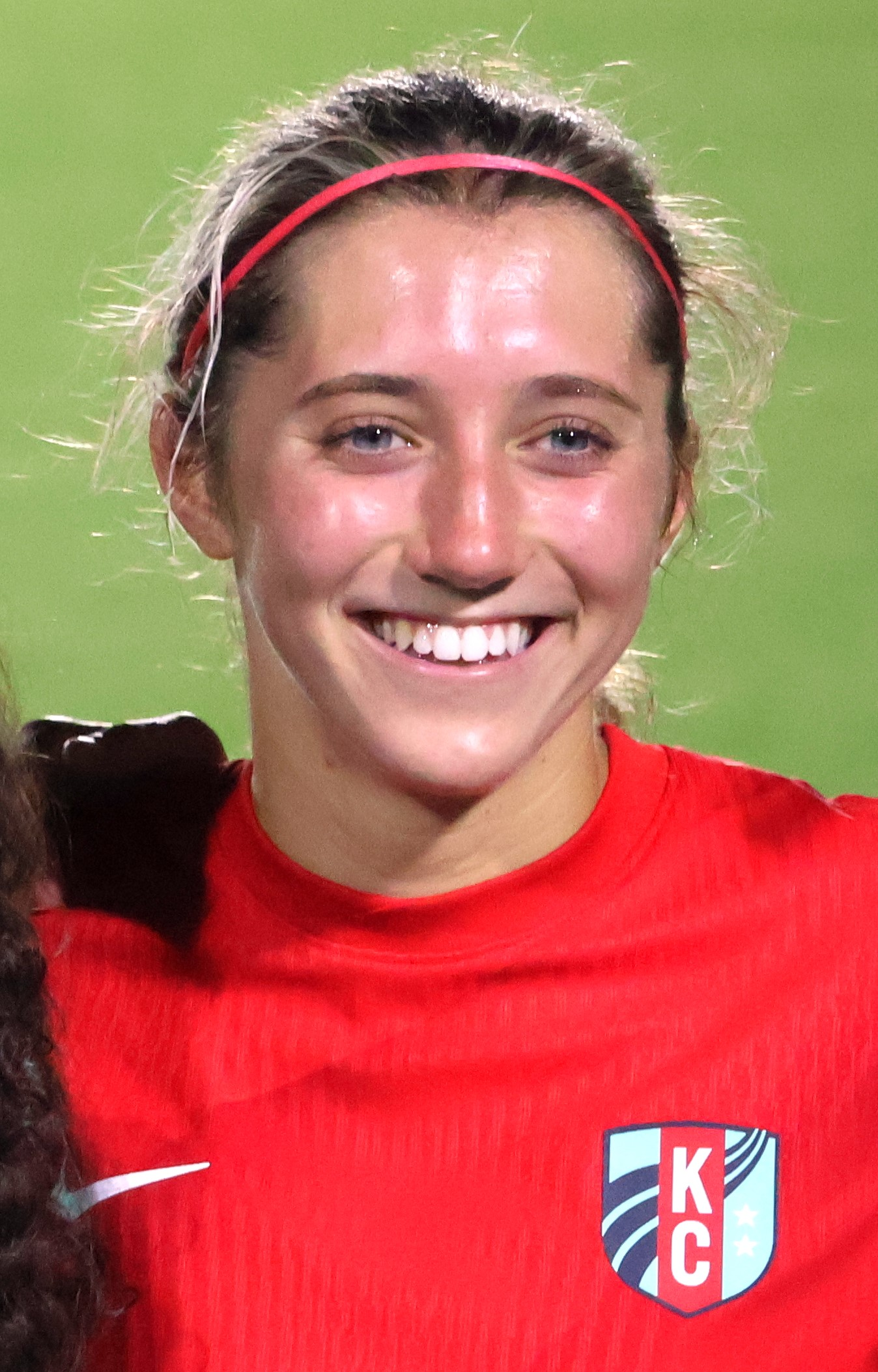
- Long with the Kansas City Current in 2025

Personal information
- Full name: Mary Angela Long
- Date of birth: January 24, 2007 (age 19)
- Height: 5 ft 10 in (1.78 m)
- Positions: Attacking midfielder; striker

Team information
- Current team: Kansas City Current
- Number: 19

College career
Years	Team	Apps	(Gls)
2024	Duke Blue Devils	15	(3)

Senior career*
Years	Team	Apps	(Gls)
2025–	Kansas City Current	10	(0)

International career^{‡}
2024	United States U-17	8	(3)
2025–	United States U-20	5	(5)
Medal record
Women's soccer
FIFA U-17 Women's World Cup
Bronze medal – third place	Dominican Republic 2024
- * Club domestic league appearances and goals as of November 1, 2025 ‡ National team caps and goals as of December 3, 2025

Mary Angela Long (born January 24, 2007) is an American professional soccer player who plays as a forward for the Kansas City Current of the National Women's Soccer League (NWSL). She played one season of college soccer for the Duke Blue Devils before joining the Kansas City Current, which is co-owned by her parents, Angie and Chris Long. She won bronze with the United States at the 2024 FIFA U-17 Women's World Cup.

== Early life ==
Long grew up in Mission Hills, Kansas, one of four children born to Angie and Chris Long. She began playing soccer when she was three. At age 12, she traveled with a regional all-star team to an international tournament in France that coincided with the 2019 FIFA Women's World Cup; the trip sparked her parents' interest in buying a women's soccer team, which became the Kansas City Current.

Long, playing up an age group, scored the winning goal for KC Athletics in the under-15 ECNL national championship in 2021. She helped California-based club Slammers FC HB Køge reach the ECNL national final in 2023, leading the team with six goals in the playoffs and being named an All-American. She trained as a non-roster invitee with the Kansas City Current in 2023 and 2024. She graduated one year early from Shawnee Mission East High School in Kansas in 2024, for which she took six additional online classes in her final semester.

=== Duke Blue Devils ===
Long played one season for the Duke Blue Devils as a 17-year-old freshman in 2024. She scored 3 goals in 15 appearances (all as a substitute), helping Duke win the Atlantic Coast Conference regular-season title in Robbie Church's final season as head coach. She missed about a month of action while at the 2024 FIFA U-17 Women's World Cup. In the NCAA tournament, Long assisted on the opening goal in a 2–0 win over Michigan State in the third round as Duke reached the semifinals where they lost to North Carolina.

== Club career ==
The Kansas City Current announced on January 8, 2025, that they had signed Long to her first professional contract on a one-year deal. She made her professional debut on April 19, coming on as a late substitute for Debinha in a 2–0 win over the Houston Dash. In July, she scored her first professional goal against Corinthians in the Teal Rising Cup exhibition tournament. On September 26, she recorded her first professional assist, to MVP Temwa Chawinga, in a 4–1 win over the Chicago Stars. Head coach Vlatko Andonovski handed Long her first NWSL start the following week in a 1–0 win over Angel City. She finished her rookie season with ten league appearances and one start. Kansas City won the NWSL Shield with the best record in the league, setting multiple NWSL records including most points and most wins in a season. She was unused in the playoffs as the Current were upset by Gotham FC in the quarterfinals. On December 4, she signed a two-year contract extension to stay with the club through 2027.

== International career ==
Long was first called up to the United States youth national team at the under-17 level in July 2024, scoring twice in a friendly against Brazil. She was selected to the roster for the 2024 FIFA U-17 Women's World Cup, where she helped the team place third, its best result since 2008. She appeared in all 6 games (5 starts) and scored one goal in a 5–0 group stage win over South Korea. She scored two goals in her under-20 debut in a 3–1 win over Puerto Rico at the 2025 CONCACAF Women's U-20 Championship. She added a third goal at the tournament and an assist against Costa Rica.

== Honors ==
Duke Blue Devils

- Atlantic Coast Conference: 2024

Kansas City Current

- NWSL Championship: 2026
- NWSL Shield: 2025

United States U-17

- FIFA U-17 Women's World Cup bronze medal: 2024
