= Odd Gulbrandsen =

Norwegian footballer (born 1953)

Personal information
- Date of birth: 11 March 1953 (age 73)
- Position: Winger

Senior career*
Years	Team	Apps	(Gls)
1970–1971	Rosenborg	12	(1)
- * Club domestic league appearances and goals

Odd Gulbrandsen (born 11 March 1953) is a Norwegian former footballer who played as a winger, making 12 1. Divisjon appearances for Rosenborg. He also played against Standard Liège in the 1970–71 European Cup.

Odd's daughter Ragnhild Gulbrandsen also became a professional footballer and represented the Norway women's national team.
