= Hannah Claesson =

Swedish footballer (born 1991)

Personal information
- Full name: Hannah Claesson
- Date of birth: August 9, 1991 (age 35)
- Place of birth: Katrineholm, Sweden
- Position: Defender

Team information
- Current team: Kvarnsvedens IK
- Number: 4

College career
Years	Team	Apps	(Gls)
2010-2013	Thomas University		

Senior career*
Years	Team	Apps	(Gls)
2013-2015	IFK Gävle	0	(0)
2015-2018	Västerås BK30	50	(2)
2019-	Kvarnsvedens	19	(0)
- * Club domestic league appearances and goals

Hannah Claesson (born August 9, 1991) is a Swedish professional soccer player from Katrineholm, Sweden. She plays for Kvarnsvedens IK in Borlänge. Sweden.

== Club career ==
=== SK Slavia Praha Juniors, 2007 ===
In 2007, Claesson played with SK Slavia Praha juniors team. While there she scored 4 goals as a defender and played 464 minutes.

=== Thomas University, 2010–13 ===
Claesson played for Thomas University from 2010–13

For the 2010 Season, Claesson was named First Team All-Conference by the Association of Independent Institutions.

In 2011, Claesson was named to the A.I.I All-Conference First Team.

In the 2013 season, she was named to the Honorable Mention list for the Sun Conference and the Sun Conference Defensive Player of the Week (September 23–29, 2013).

On August 28, 2016, Claesson was named to Thomas University all-time top eleven for the women's team.

=== IFK Gävle, 2013 ===
From May- August 2013, Claesson played for IFK Gävle while home for summer break from Thomas University.

=== Västerås BK30, 2015– 2018 ===
Claesson joined Västerås BK30 in 2015.

=== Kvarnsvedens IK, 2019– Present ===
Claesson signed for Kvarnsvedens IK of Elitettan in 2019.
