= Laura Schott =

American soccer player (born 1981)

Personal information
- Date of birth: April 4, 1981 (age 45)
- Place of birth: Portland, Oregon, U.S.
- Height: 5 ft 5 in (1.65 m)
- Position: Forward

Youth career
- FC Portland
- –1999: Jesuit Crusaders

College career
Years	Team	Apps	(Gls)
1999–2002	California Golden Bears	76	(56)

Senior career*
Years	Team	Apps	(Gls)
2003	Washington Freedom	7	(0)
2004	California Storm		

International career
- United States U18
2001	United States U21		
2001	United States	5	(1)

Managerial career
- Eastside United FC
- 2005–2008: Portland State Vikings (assistant)
- 2008–2017: Portland State Vikings
- Portland Thorns Academy
- * Club domestic league appearances and goals

Laura Schott (born April 4, 1981) is an American former soccer player who played as a forward, making five appearances for the United States women's national team.

== Playing career ==
Schott played for the Jesuit Crusaders in high school, scoring 116 career goals and winning four consecutive state championships. She was chosen as a Parade High-School All-American, and was an NSCAA Oregon Player of the Year in her junior and senior years. She also played club soccer for FC Portland, winning seven consecutive state championships, and participated in track and field. In college, she played for the California Golden Bears from 1999 to 2002. She was an NSCAA All-American in 2000, as well as the Soccer America MVP in the same year. She was also included in the Soccer Buzz All-America first team in 2000 and second team in 2001, and was selected in the All-Pac-10 second team in 1999 and first team in 2000, 2001, and 2002. Schott was chosen in the NSCAA All-Region team in 2000 (first team), 2001 (second team), and 2002 (third team), as well as the Soccer Buzz All-West team in all four years (first team 2000 and 2001, second in 1999, third in 2002). In 2001, she was a finalist for the Hermann Trophy. In total, she scored 56 goals and recorded 16 assists in 76 appearances for the Golden Bears. Her career goal tally stands as a school record, while her career points (goals and assists) of 128 ranks second at the school.

Schott appeared for the under-18 and under-21 U.S. national teams, winning the 2001 Nordic Cup with the latter. She made her international debut for the United States on March 7, 2001 in a friendly match against Italy. In total, she made five appearances for the U.S., earning her final cap on March 17, 2001 in the 2001 Algarve Cup against Norway, and scored her only international goal in the match.

Schott was selected by the Washington Freedom in the 2003 WUSA Draft. She made seven appearances during the 2003 season and recorded one assist, with the team finishing as champions. In 2004, she played for the California Storm of the WPSL, which one the championship.

In 2012, Schott was inducted into the Jesuit High School Athletic Hall of Fame, and was inducted into the "Lair of Legends" of the California Golden Bears in 2015. In 2017, she was inducted into the Cal Athletic Hall of Fame.

== Coaching career ==
Schott later worked as the assistant director of Tualatin Hills United Soccer Club, and coached as part of the Oregon Olympic Development Program. She began coaching at Eastside United Football Club, winning a state championship in 2010. From 2008 to 2017, she served as the head coach of the Portland State Vikings women's soccer team, where she was named Big Sky Coach of the Year in 2009 and 2013. She previously had served as an assistant coach for the Vikings.

From 2017 to 2020 she served as the academy director of Portland Thorns FC.

In February, 2020 she was hired as the head coach for the George Fox University women's soccer team.

== Personal life ==
Schott was born in Portland, Oregon, though she grew up in Wilsonville. She graduated from the University of California, Berkeley in 2004 with Bachelor of Science degrees in political science and mass communications.

== Career statistics ==
=== International ===
United States
Year	Apps	Goals
2001	5	1
Total	5	1

=== International goals ===
No.	Date	Location	Opponent	Score	Result	Competition
1	March 17, 2001	Quarteira, Portugal	Norway	2–1	3–4	2001 Algarve Cup
