= Jessica Fischer =

American soccer player (born 1974)

Personal information
- Date of birth: November 16, 1974 (age 51)
- Place of birth: San Diego, United States
- Height: 5 ft 8 in (1.73 m)
- Position: Sweeper

Youth career
- –1992: Mira Mesa Marauders

College career
Years	Team	Apps	(Gls)
1992–1995	Stanford Cardinal	82	(23)

Senior career*
Years	Team	Apps	(Gls)
2001	San Diego Spirit	0	(0)

International career
1993	United States	2	(0)
- * Club domestic league appearances and goals

Jessica Fischer (born November 16, 1974) is an American former soccer player who played as a sweeper, making two appearances for the United States women's national team.

== Career ==
Fischer played for the Mira Mesa Marauders in high school. In college, she played for the Stanford Cardinal from 1992 to 1995. She was an NSCAA, Soccer America, and Soccer News First-Team All-American in 1994 and 1995, as well as a Soccer News Second-Team All-American in 1993. She was included in the NSCAA All-West Region second team in 1992 and first team in 1994 and 1995, as well as the Soccer News All-West Region first team in 1993, where she was the defensive MVP. Fischer was included in the All-Pac-10 first team in 1995. In total, she scored 23 goals and recorded 13 assists in 82 appearances for Stanford.

Fischer made her international debut for the United States on June 12, 1993 in a friendly match against Canada. She earned her second and final cap for the U.S. on June 21, 1993 in another friendly against Canada.

Fischer was included on the San Diego Spirit roster during the 2001 WUSA season, but did not make an appearance. In 2007, she was inducted into the Stanford Athletics Hall of Fame. In 2015, she was named to the Pac-12 All-Century Reserve Women's Soccer Team.

== Personal life ==
Fischer grew up in the Mira Mesa neighborhood of San Diego.

== Career statistics ==
=== International ===
United States
Year	Apps	Goals
1993	2	0
Total	2	0
