= Cassandra Korhonen =

Swedish footballer (born 1998)

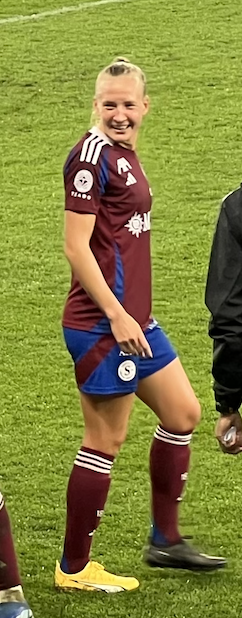
- Korhonen playing with Servette in 2024

Personal information
- Full name: Maria Cassandra Hannele Korhonen
- Date of birth: 1 January 1998 (age 28)
- Place of birth: Västerås, Västmanland, Sweden
- Height: 1.66 m (5 ft 5 in)
- Position: Forward

Team information
- Current team: Charlton Athletic

Senior career*
| Years | Team | Apps | (Gls) |
| 2012 | Gideonsbergs | 0 | (0) |
| 2013–2018 | Västerås BK30 | 50 | (26) |
| 2019–2020 | Uppsala | 45 | (29) |
| 2021 | Åland United | 23 | (21) |
| 2021–2022 | Benfica | 7 | (2) |
| 2022–2025 | Servette FC Chênois | 46 | (19) |
| 2025–2026 | HB Køge | 14 | (3) |
| 2026– | Charlton Athletic | 0 | (0) |

International career
| 2015 | Sweden U17 | 3 | (1) |
| 2019 | Sweden U21 | 1 | (0) |
- * Club domestic league appearances and goals as of 22:31, 5 January 2026 (UTC)

Maria Cassandra Hannele Korhonen (born 1 January 1998) is a Swedish footballer who plays as a forward for Women's Super League club Charlton Athletic.

Korhonen started her career with Swedish club Gideonsbergs, before spending five years with Västerås BK30. In 2019, she joined Uppsala and left after their relegation. After spending a season at Finnish club Åland United, she joined Portuguese club Benfica, where she won the league title. Korhonen then spent three years at Swiss side Servette, before joining Danish club HB Køge.

== Career ==
On 12 December 2020, Korhonen left Uppsala after their relegation; describing an unhappy environment at the club.

On 22 December 2020, Korhonen joined Åland United on a permanent transfer.

On 29 December 2021, Korhonen was announced at Benfica on a permanent transfer.

On 11 July 2022, Korhonen was announced at Servette on a permanent transfer.

On 2 May 2024, Korhonen extended her contract with Servette FC Chênois for an additional year, with the option of a third.

On 3 October 2025, Korhonen was announced at HB Køge.

On 10 September 2026, Korhonen was announced at Charlton Athletic.
