= Västerås BK30 =

Swedish sports club

- Full name: Västerås bollklubb av år 1930
- Sport: Soccer; Earlier: bandy, handball, ice hockey, table tennis, track and field athletics
- Founded: 29 November 1929
- Based in: Västerås, Sweden

Västerås BK30 is a sports club in Västerås, Sweden, established on 29 November 1929 as a merger of IK City and IK Sture and named after 1930, the year it joined the Swedish Sports Confederation. The club nowadays mostly runs soccer, earlier bandy, handball, ice hockey, table tennis and track and field athletics.

The soccer activity has mostly used Ringvallens IP as a home ground. In 1969, a women's soccer team was established, which played in the Swedish top division in 1994.

Until the mid 1980s, bandy was a major sport. The club played in the Swedish top division in 1932 and 1936.

== BK30 Dam Fotboll (women's soccer) 2016 season ==
In the 2016 Swedish Division 1 season, Västerås BK30 finished first and was promoted to Elitettan following a two game playoff versus Jitex Mölndal BK.

=== Goal scorers ===
This is a list of all the goal scores for the 2016 season.

Player	Goal(s)	Including penalty goals
Cassandra Korhonen	24	0
Alana Anne Smith	15	0
Hannah Claesson	6	1
Marie Segerholm	6	0
Jennifer Forsman Ekfeldt	4	0
Sydney Anne Blomquist	3	0
Ulrika Rejdemark	3	0
Elin Hammar	2	0
Amanda Wegerman	1	0
Emma Weber	1	0
Lauren Elizabeth Prott	1	0
Maria Rodriguez	1	0
Megan Tabler	1	0

=== First-team squad ===
As of 15 May 2016

No.	Position	Player
1	Goalkeeper	Jonna Böckert
2	Defender	Hannah Claesson
3	Midfielder	Jennifer Forsman Ekfeldt
4	Midfielder	Emma Weber
6	DF/Midfielder	Maria Rodriguez (captain)
7	Defender	Madeleine Ekstrand
8	Defender	Lauren Elizabeth Prott
9	Forward	Cassandra Korhonen
10	Midfielder/Defender	Emma Salmi
11	Forward	Alana Anne Smith
12	Midfielder/Defender	Jennifer Holmström
14	Midfielder	Tindra Andersson
15	Midfielder	Ulrika Rejdemark
18	Midfielder/Defender	Jill Tröjbom
19	Midfielder/Forward	Marie Segerholm
21	Defender	Nora Elaies
