= Ragnhild Gulbrandsen =

Norwegian journalist and footballer (born 1977)

Personal information
- Full name: Ragnhild Øren Gulbrandsen
- Date of birth: 22 February 1977 (age 49)
- Place of birth: Narvik, Norway
- Height: 1.71 m (5 ft 7 1/2 in)
- Position: Striker

Youth career
- Ranheim

Senior career*
Years	Team	Apps	(Gls)
1997–2001	Trondheims-Ørn	70	(93)
2002–2003	Boston Breakers	13	(1)
2004–2005	Trondheims-Ørn	18	(17)
2005–2007	Asker	16	(10)

International career^{‡}
1997–2007	Norway	80	(30)
Medal record
Women's football
Representing Norway
Olympic Games
Gold medal – first place	2000 Sydney	Team competition
- * Club domestic league appearances and goals ‡ National team caps and goals as of 13 December 2007

Ragnhild Øren Gulbrandsen (born 22 February 1977) is a Norwegian journalist and former football striker from the city of Trondheim who retired from football at the end of 2007. Most of her playing career was spent with Trondheims-Ørn (Trondheim Eagles) women's football club, with whom she won the Norwegian elite league, the Toppserien, three times and the Cup four times, and was the club's top scorer in 1997, 2000 and 2001. As of April 2012, Gulbrandsen's 141 Toppserien goals made her third in the all-time goalscorer statistics.

In 2000 Gulbrandsen played in the Norway team which won gold at the Sydney Olympics, scoring Norway's second goal in the 3–2 final win against the USA. She played as a professional in the US with Women's United Soccer Association (WUSA) club Boston Breakers in 2002 and 2003.

At the end of 2005 Gulbrandsen moved to Oslo to work as a journalist, and considered retiring from football. But she joined Asker women's football club, and in the 2006 season when Asker won the Division 1 title, she twice scored six goals in a match. She last played for Asker SK and the Norway national football team.

At the FIFA Women's World Cup 2007 tournament in China in 2007, Gulbrandsen scored six goals for Norway and won the Tournament's Bronze Shoe award as the third top scorer behind Marta of Brazil and Abby Wambach of the US. Her international career, which was interrupted several times by injury, included 97 appearances for Norway at all levels, with 38 goals. She later found employment as a journalist for Budstikka.

Ragnhild's father Odd Gulbrandsen played professional football for Rosenborg BK. She is not related to the contemporary Norwegian footballer Solveig Gulbrandsen.

== International goals ==
No.	Date	Venue	Opponent	Score	Result	Competition
1.	17 June 1998	Ulefoss, Norway	Germany	1–0	3–2	1999 FIFA Women's World Cup qualification
2.	17 June 1998	Ulefoss, Norway	Germany	3–1	3–2	1999 FIFA Women's World Cup qualification
3.	11 September 1999	Strusshamn, Norway	Switzerland	1–0	4–0	UEFA Women's Euro 2001 qualifying
4.	7 May 2000	Moss, Norway	Portugal	4–0	5–0	UEFA Women's Euro 2001 qualifying
5.	28 September 2000	Sydney, Australia	United States	2–1	3–2 (a.e.t.)	2000 Summer Olympics
6.	15 March 2001	Portimão, Portugal	Denmark	1–0	1–0	2001 Algarve Cup
7.	17 March 2001	Quarteira, Portugal	United States	1–0	4–3	2001 Algarve Cup
8.	17 March 2001	Quarteira, Portugal	United States	2–3	4–3	2001 Algarve Cup
9.	17 March 2001	Quarteira, Portugal	United States	3–3	4–3	2001 Algarve Cup
10.	2 October 2004	Porsgrunn, Norway	Spain	1–0	2–0	UEFA Women's Euro 2005 qualifying
11.	10 November 2004	Reykjavík, Iceland	Iceland	4–0	7–2	UEFA Women's Euro 2005 qualifying
12.	10 November 2004	Reykjavík, Iceland	Iceland	5–0	7–2	UEFA Women's Euro 2005 qualifying
13.	25 March 2006	Athens, Greece	Greece	1–0	3–0	2007 FIFA Women's World Cup qualification
14.	25 March 2006	Athens, Greece	Greece	3–0	3–0	2007 FIFA Women's World Cup qualification
15.	20 June 2006	Halden, Norway	Greece	1–0	4–0	2007 FIFA Women's World Cup qualification
16.	20 June 2006	Halden, Norway	Greece	2–0	4–0	2007 FIFA Women's World Cup qualification
17.	23 September 2006	Rimini, Italy	Italy	1–0	2–1	2007 FIFA Women's World Cup qualification
18.	30 August 2007	Mainz, Germany	Germany	2–1	2–2	Friendly
19.	12 September 2007	Hangzhou, China	Canada	1–1	2–1	2007 FIFA Women's World Cup
20.	15 September 2007	Hangzhou, China	Australia	1–0	1–1	2007 FIFA Women's World Cup
21.	20 September 2007	Hangzhou, China	Ghana	2–0	7–2	2007 FIFA Women's World Cup
22.	20 September 2007	Hangzhou, China	Ghana	5–0	7–2	2007 FIFA Women's World Cup
23.	20 September 2007	Hangzhou, China	Ghana	6–0	7–2	2007 FIFA Women's World Cup
24.	30 September 2007	Shanghai, China	United States	1–4	1–4	2007 FIFA Women's World Cup
