= Ronnie Fair =

American soccer player (born 1978)

Personal information
- Full name: Veronica Fair Sullins
- Birth name: Veronica Ching Fair
- Date of birth: August 5, 1978 (age 48)
- Place of birth: Los Altos, California, U.S.
- Height: 5 ft 3 in (1.60 m)
- Position: Defender

College career
Years	Team	Apps	(Gls)
1996–1999	Stanford Cardinal		

Senior career*
Years	Team	Apps	(Gls)
2000	Boston Renegades	12	(0)
2001–2002	New York Power	42	(0)
2003	San Diego Spirit	15	(0)
2004	San Diego WFC SeaLions		

International career
1997–1998	United States	3	(0)
- * Club domestic league appearances and goals

Veronica Fair Sullins (born Veronica Ching Fair; August 5, 1978) is an American retired professional soccer player who represented the United States national team, winning three caps. She played professional club soccer for New York Power and San Diego Spirit of the Women's United Soccer Association (WUSA).

Her twin sister, Lorrie Fair, was also a member of the national team, and when Ronnie was called in to participate in a game against England on May 9, 1997, in San Jose, California, it became the first time a pair of sisters played together for the women's national team.

== Playing career ==
In 2000 Fair played for Boston Renegades of the USL W-League. She served three assists in her 12 appearances.

Fair was drafted to the New York Power for the inaugural season of the WUSA. She started all 21 games and served two assists. She returned with the Power for the 2002 season and was the only player on the squad to start all 21 games. She played a total of 1752 minutes as a midfielder and defender during the season. Her four assists ranked second on the team. During the 2003 season, Fair played for the San Diego Spirit.

== International career ==
In 1997, Fair made two substitute appearances for the senior United States women's team. She started a match in 1998 for a total of three caps.

== Current career ==
Dr. Veronica Fair Sullins graduated from medical school at the University of California, San Diego in 2009 after earning a BS in Biological Sciences at Stanford. She completed her residency at Harbor–UCLA Medical Center in general surgery. Sullins then matched in a highly competitive pediatric surgery program at Children's Hospital of Wisconsin. She is now a pediatric surgeon at Mattel Children's Hospital at UCLA.
