= Sydney Blomquist =

American professional soccer player

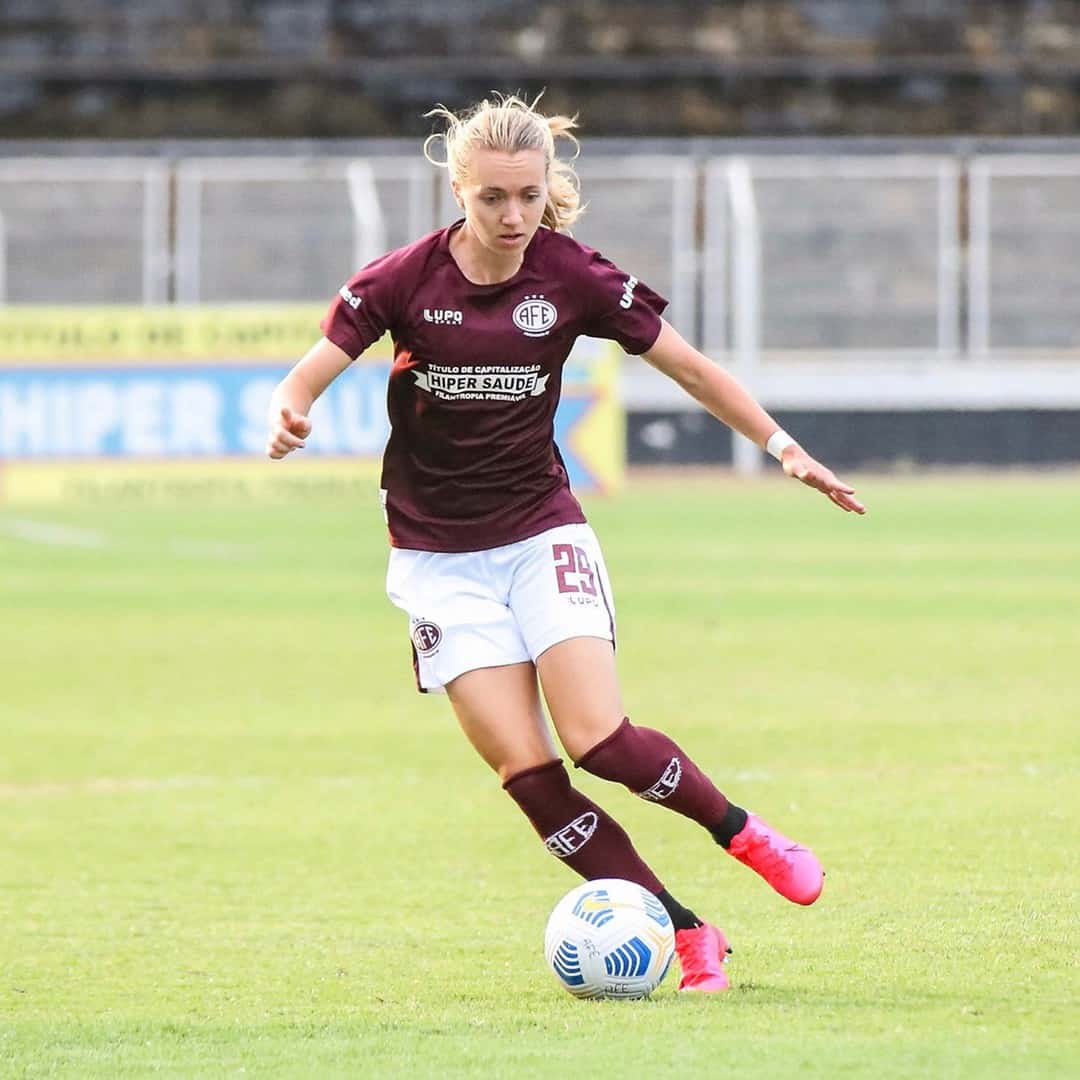

Personal information
- Full name: Sydney Anne Blomquist
- Date of birth: August 31, 1993 (age 33)
- Place of birth: Baltimore, Maryland, United States
- Height: 5 ft 7 in (1.70 m)
- Positions: Midfielder; winger

Team information
- Current team: SC Telstar VVNH
- Number: 13

College career
Years	Team	Apps	(Gls)
2011–2012	Louisville Cardinals		
2013–2014	Akron Zips		

Senior career*
Years	Team	Apps	(Gls)
2016	Västerås BK30	11	(3)
2017–2018	Åland United	47	(3)
2019	Sporting CP	7	(0)
2020	Detroit City FC	3	(0)
2021	Ferroviária	5	(0)
2022	Avaldsnes IL	22	(3)
2023	Detroit City FC	12	(4)
2024–2025	SC Telstar VVNH	13	(1)
- * Club domestic league appearances and goals

Sydney Anne Blomquist (born August 31, 1993) is an American professional soccer player from Bel Air, Maryland. She played most recently for SC Telstar in the women's Eredivisie. She is now an NCAA Division I assistant soccer coach at Stony Brook University.

== Early life ==
Blomquist was born on August 31, 1993, in Baltimore, Maryland to Joel and Nancy Blomquist.

Blomquist played her high school soccer at Fallston High School, where she was a 4-year varsity starter. As a Senior, she was team captain and named Second Team All-State, First Team All-County, and First Team All-Upper Chesapeake Bay. During her junior season her team won 2A state championship, and during her sophomore season they were 3A State finalist.

Blomquist played her club soccer for Freestate Soccer Alliance- Fury 93 and was a part of Maryland ODP from 2005 to 2009.

=== Collegiate career ===
Blomquist attended University of Louisville her freshman and sophomore year. While there she was named to the Dean's List, received the Red & Black Scholar, and was placed on the Athletic Director's Honor Roll. Then in 2013, Blomquist transferred to the University of Akron. During her two years at Akron, she appeared in 36 matches.

== Playing career ==
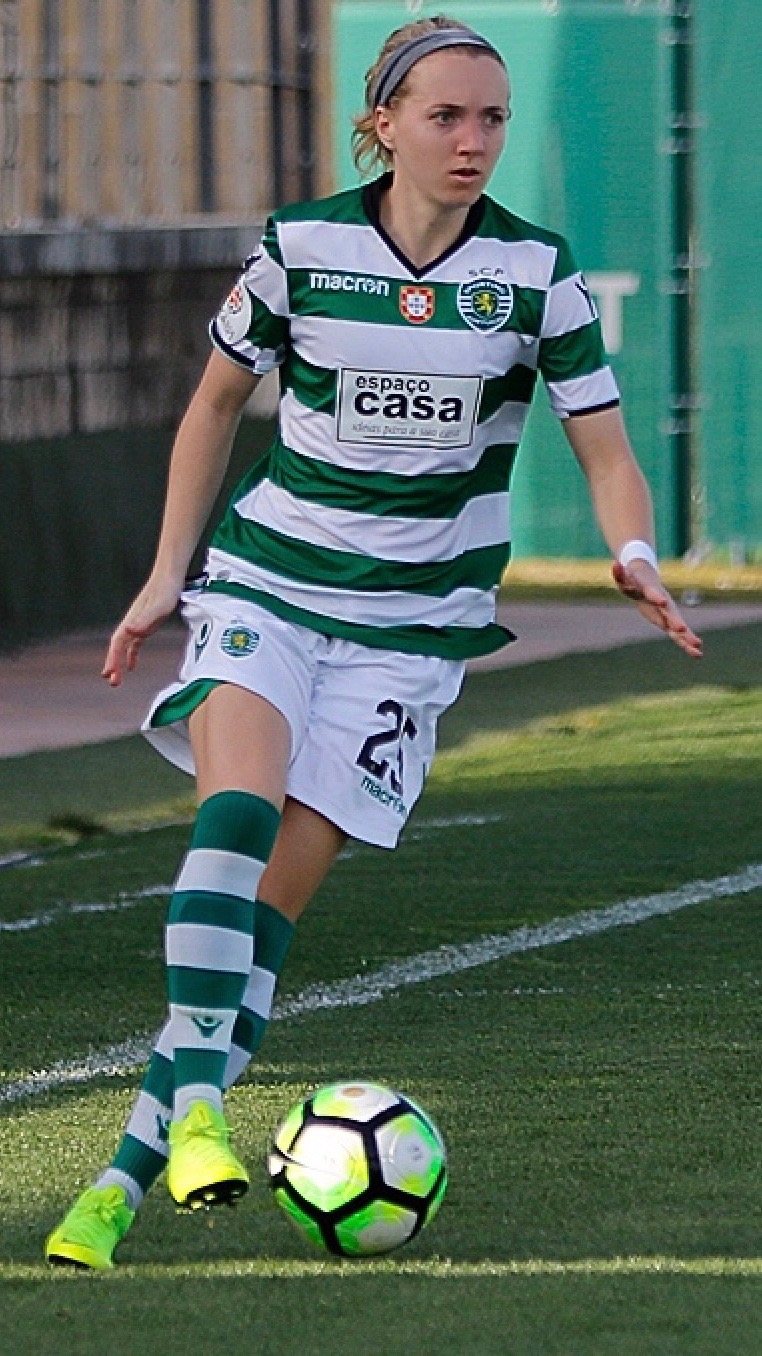
Blomquist with Sporting CP in 2019

=== Club ===
==== Lancaster Inferno, 2014 & 2016 ====
Blomquist played with the Lancaster Inferno of the UWS in 2014 and 2016.

==== Columbus Eagles, 2015 ====
Blomquist played for the Columbus Eagles FC of the WPSL in 2015.

==== Västerås BK30, 2016 ====
Blomquist signed a professional contract with Västerås BK30 on August 1, 2016. She scored three goals total: one goal against Örebro SK Söder.

==== Åland United, 2017 ====
On January 1, 2017, Blomquist signed with Åland United. In the 2017 season she made 24 appearances, making 23 starts and playing a total of 2075 minutes. She was part of the team which won bronze in the Finnish Cup.

==== Sporting Clube De Portugal, 2019 ====
Blomquist signed with Sporting Clube de Portugal in January 2019. She quickly became the starting right back for the Portuguese club.

==== Detroit City FC, 2020 and 2023 ====
On April 9, 2020, Blomquist signed with Detroit City FC for their inaugural women's season. Due to the COVID-19 pandemic, the 2020 season was cut short to a 3 match series. She was named MVP for the abbreviated campaign. Blomquist controlled much of the team's attack and was a part of every goal scored.

In 2023, Blomquist returned to DCFC to compete in the USL W League. Over a span of 12 matches, she predominantly played as attacking center mid, tallying 11 points (4 goals, 3 assists) for Le Rouge.

==== Ferroviária, 2021 ====
For the 2021 season, Blomquist played for Associação Ferroviária de Esportes in Araraquara, Brazil. The Brazilian club is known for being two-time Copa Libertadores champions.

==== Avaldsnes IL, 2022 ====
On December 13, 2021, Avaldsnes announced the signing of Blomquist on a 2-year deal. The club is managed by John Arne Riise.

==== Telstar, 2024-2025 ====
Blomquist made a move to the Netherlands in 2024, signing with Telstar in the women’s Eredivisie. During the 24/25 campaign, Blomquist made 13 appearances, notching 1 goal and 1 assist against Feyenoord and AZ Alkmaar.

== Coaching career ==
Blomquist joined the coaching staff of Florida Gulf Coast University's NCAA Division I women's soccer team in August 2025 as an assistant coach. In her one season with the Eagles and she help claim the ASUN Graphite Division Championship. In February 2026, Blomquist was hired as an assistant at Stony Brook.
