= 1994 Damallsvenskan =

Swedish women's football season

The 1994 Damallsvenskan was the seventh season of the Damallsvenskan. Matches were played between 23 April and 22 October 1994. Malmö FF won the title by four points from Hammarby. Gideonsbergs IF finished third. This was the first and only time that the two teams that have played in every Damallsvenskan season finished in the top two places. Östers IF and Västerås BK were promoted before the season started. Västerås went straight back down again, along with Wä IF.

== Table ==
Pos	Team	Pld	W	D	L	GF	GA	GD	Pts	Qualification or relegation
1	Malmö FF (C, M)	22	18	2	2	73	17	+56	56	Champions
2	Hammarby	22	16	4	2	72	16	+56	52	
3	Gideonsbergs IF	22	15	3	4	76	29	+47	48	
4	Öxabäck/Mark IF	22	15	1	6	66	42	+24	46	
5	Älvsjö AIK	22	14	1	7	60	32	+28	43	
6	Tyresö FF	22	10	3	9	35	35	0	33	
7	Jitex BK/JG93	22	9	3	10	46	42	+4	30	
8	Sunnanå SK	22	7	2	13	43	45	−2	23	
9	Östers IF (N)	22	6	0	16	24	60	−36	18	
10	AIK	22	4	4	14	18	52	−34	16	
11	Wä IF (R)	22	3	1	18	11	91	−80	10	Relegated
12	Västerås BK (R, N)	22	2	2	18	15	78	−63	8	Relegated

Source: aik.se
(C) Champions; (M) Defending champions; (N) Newly promoted to the competition before the season; (R) Relegated
