= Avani Brandt =

American soccer player (born 2003)

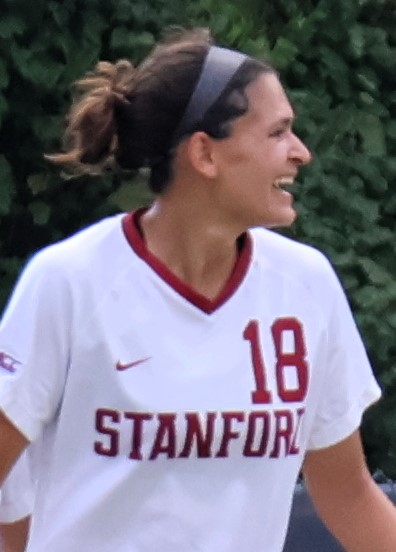
- Brandt with Stanford in 2024

Personal information
- Full name: Avani Kimberly Brandt
- Date of birth: August 26, 2003 (age 23)
- Place of birth: Manhattan, New York, U.S.
- Height: 5 ft 6 in (1.68 m)
- Positions: Defender; midfielder

Team information
- Current team: Feyenoord
- Number: 5

Youth career
- SUSA Academy
- East Meadow SC

College career
Years	Team	Apps	(Gls)
2021–2024	Stanford Cardinal	77	(0)

Senior career*
Years	Team	Apps	(Gls)
2025–2026	HB Køge	19	(0)
2026–	Feyenoord	1	(0)

International career^{‡}
2022	United States U20	2	(0)
- * Club domestic league appearances and goals as of 16:57, September 2, 2026 (UTC) ‡ National team caps and goals as of 03:47, August 5, 2025 (UTC)

Avani Kimberly Brant (born August 26, 2003) is an American professional soccer player who plays as a defender or midfielder for Vrouwen Eredivisie club Feyenoord. She played college soccer for the Stanford Cardinal and has previously appeared for the United States under-20 national team.

== Early life ==
Brandt was born in Manhattan, New York, but was raised in the suburban neighborhood of Syosset. She played youth soccer for SUSA in the Elite Clubs National League and East Meadow SC. Brandt attended Syosset High School, where she was named two-time all-state, three-time all-county, and two-time team captain. In 2021, she was recognized as a high school All-American. Brandt was a versatile player throughout her high school career, starting as a midfielder before moving up to the forward line. In her final high school game, she scored a brace to help Syosset win a conference championship; earlier on in her high school career, Brandt had also helped the school win the title for the first time in program history.

== College career ==
Brandt began playing college soccer with the Stanford Cardinal in the 2021 fall season. She earned her first collegiate goal contribution in her second game as a Cardinal, tallying an assist against San Diego State. Over the course of the season, she consistently challenged for playing time, starting in all but 3 of her 19 appearances. Her performances earned her a spot on the Pac-12 All-Freshman team.

As a sophomore, Brandt helped Stanford win a Pac-12 Championship and subsequently make a deep run into the NCAA Tournament, where the team was eventually defeated in the final by Florida State. During conference play, Brandt had helped combine with Stanford's defensive unit to produce 12 shutouts. The following year, the Cardinal backline continued to show defensive solidity, increasing the number to 14. In her final season with Stanford, Brandt helped the team make another deep run into the college cup, where its journey ultimately ended in the semifinals.

== Club career ==
Brandt was named as a non-roster invitee on Portland Thorns FC's 2025 preseason squad, but she ultimately did not make the final roster. In June 2025, she joined the Kansas City Current II squad that competed at the Soccer Tournament 2025.

On July 15, 2025, Brandt signed her first professional contract with Danish club HB Køge. Her move to Køge bolstered a strong American contingent within the squad, which included her former Stanford and Current II teammate Samantha Williams. During her season at HB Køge, she won both the A-liga title and the Danish cup.

On August 4, 2026, Brandt's move to Feyenoord was announced.

== International career ==
In 2022, Brandt received a call-up to the United States under-20 national team for two fixtures against Costa Rica. She started both matches as the United States recorded a pair of shutout victories.

== Career statistics ==
=== Club ===
As of September 2, 2026

Appearances and goals by club, season and competition
Club	Season	League			Cup		Playoffs		Total	
Club	Season	Division	Apps	Goals	Apps	Goals	Apps	Goals	Apps	Goals
HB Køge	2025–26	A-Liga	19	0	6	0	—		25	0
Feyenoord	2026–27	Vrouwen Eredivisie	1	0	2	0	—		2	0
Career total			20	0	8	0	0	0	28	0

== Honors ==
Stanford Cardinal

- Pac-12 Conference: 2022

HB Køge

- A-Liga: 2025–26
- Danish Women's Cup: 2025–26

=== Individual ===
- Pac-12 all-freshman team: 2021
