= Ally Marquand =

American soccer player (born 1981)

Personal information
- Full name: Allyson Anne Estess
- Birth name: Allyson Anne Marquand
- Date of birth: July 1, 1981 (age 45)
- Place of birth: Irvine, California, United States
- Height: 5 ft 6 in (1.68 m)
- Positions: Defender; midfielder; forward

Youth career
- –1999: Mission Viejo SC Mirage
- –1999: University Trojans

College career
Years	Team	Apps	(Gls)
1999–2003	Stanford Cardinal	80	(15)

International career
- United States U18/U19
2000–2003	United States U21		
2001	United States	4	(1)

Allyson Anne Estess (née Marquand; born July 1, 1981) is an American former soccer player who played primarily as a defender or midfielder, making four appearances for the United States women's national team.

== Career ==
Marquand played for the University Trojans in high school, where she was a Parade and NSCAA High-School All-American in 1999. She also competed in cross country and track and field, earning her the Irvine World News Athlete of the Year award, and played club soccer for Mission Viejo Soccer Club Mirage. In college, Marquand played for the Stanford Cardinal from 1999 to 2003, where she was a letter-winner. She redshirted in the 2000 season due to a torn ACL. She was included in the NSCAA All-West Region second team in 2003, and was included in the All-Pac-10 first team in 2003, as well as the second team in 1999, 2001, and 2002. Marquand was an honorable mention for the All-Academic Pac-10 selection in 2001, 2002, and 2003. In total, she scored 15 goals and recorded 7 assists in 80 appearances for Stanford.

Marquand played for the under-18/19 and under-21 national teams, winning the 2001 and 2003 Nordic Cup titles with the latter. She made her international debut for the United States on March 7, 2001, in a friendly match against Italy. In total, she made four appearances for the U.S. and scored 1 goal, earning her final cap on March 17, 2001, in the 2001 Algarve Cup against Norway, with her scoring in the 3–4 loss.

== Personal life ==
Marquand is a native of Irvine, California, and works as an orthopedic surgeon specializing in sports medicine. She currently resides in Hermosa Beach, California, with her husband and two children. In 2015 and 2016, she worked as a team physician for the United States women's national under-20 soccer team.

== Career statistics ==
=== International ===
United States
Year	Apps	Goals
2001	4	1
Total	4	1

=== International goals ===
No.	Date	Location	Opponent	Score	Result	Competition
1	March 17, 2001	Quarteira, Portugal	Norway	1–1	3–4	2001 Algarve Cup
