= Angie and Chris Long =

American businesspeople

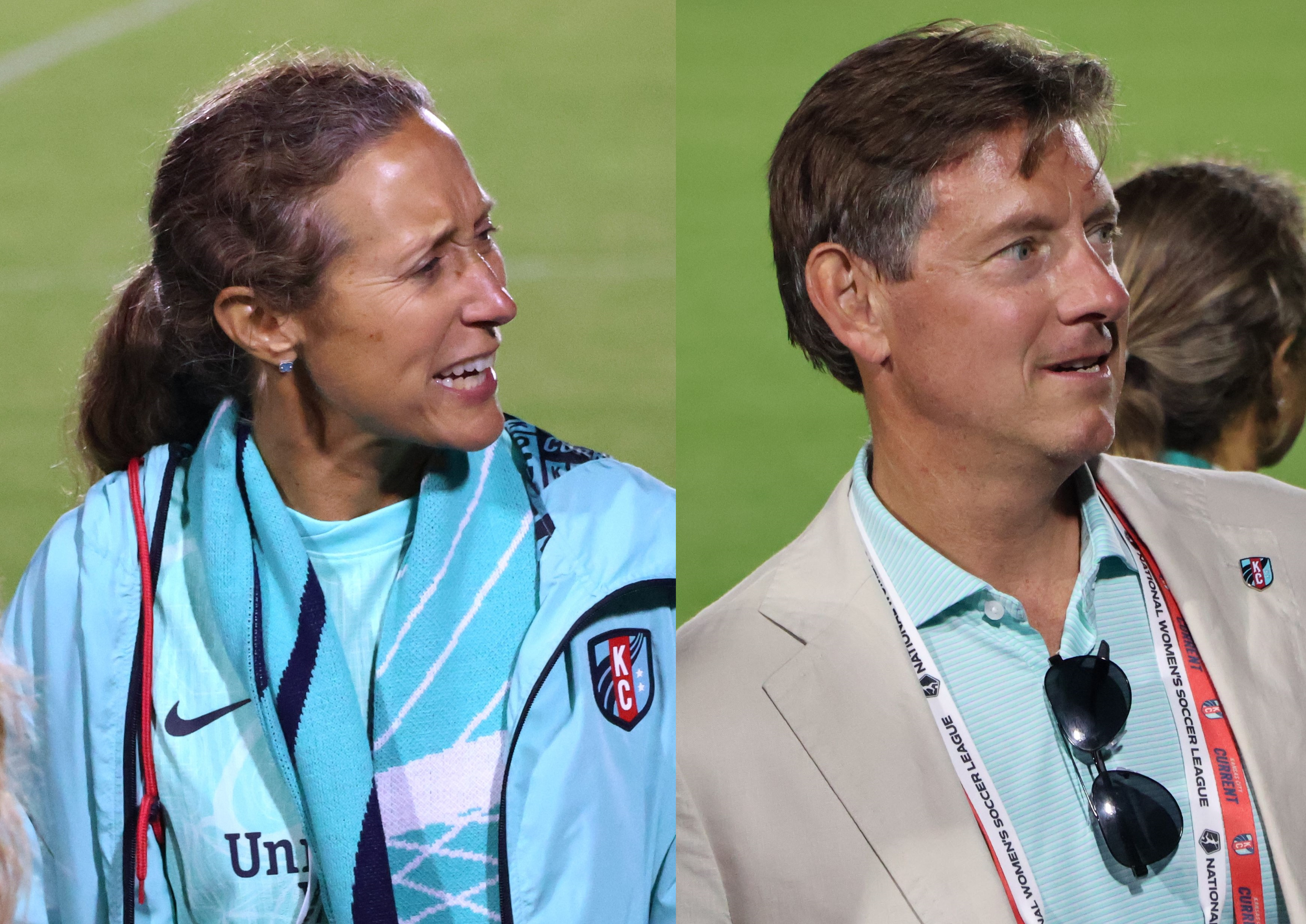
- Angie (left) and Chris Long in 2025
- Education: Princeton University
- Occupations: Angie: Chief investment officer of Palmer Square Capital Management; Chris: Chairman and chief executive officer of Palmer Square Capital Management
- Known for: Co-founders and co-owners of the Kansas City Current; Co-owners of HB Køge Women

Angie Knighton Long and Christopher D. Long are American businesspeople who operate Palmer Square Capital Management. They are co-founders and co-owners of the Kansas City Current of the National Women's Soccer League (NWSL) and the women's side of HB Køge in the Danish Women's League.

== Early lives and education ==
Angie grew up in Kansas City, Missouri, and played multiple sports including soccer from a young age. She played college golf and rugby at Princeton University. Chris Long grew up in Hazleton, Pennsylvania, as a fan of Philadelphia sports teams and played college basketball for the Princeton Tigers. The couple began dating in their junior year and married two years after their college graduation in 1997. They were college friends of Kara Nortman, who co-founded the NWSL club Angel City FC in 2020.

== Careers ==
The Longs were hired out of college by JPMorgan Chase in New York City, where Angie went on to become a managing director of credit trading. Chris later worked for TH Lee Putnam Ventures, Morgan Stanley, and Sandell Asset Management. The couple moved to Kansas City in 2006, and Chris founded his own investment company, Palmer Square Capital Management, in 2009, which Angie joined as chief investment officer in 2011.

The Longs became interested in owning a women's soccer team after watching the 2019 FIFA Women's World Cup in France. On December 7, 2020, the Longs and former soccer player Brittany Mahomes announced that they had bought NWSL club Utah Royals FC from Dell Loy Hansen and planned to move the team back to Kansas City. Hanson had earlier moved the club from Kansas City to Utah; an NWSL club in Utah was reestablished three years later. The club began play in the 2021 season and was renamed the Kansas City Current ahead of the 2022 season. The Longs financed a new, US$120 million stadium, CPKC Stadium, that opened in 2024.

On May 27, 2025, Capelli Sport sold its stake in the women's side of the Danish Women's League club HB Køge to Ballard Capital, an investment company owned and operated by Angie and Chris Long. The acquisition fully separated the women's club's business from the men's club's, and the new owners re-hired former HB Køge general manager Walid Khoury as the club's chief executive officer.

== Personal lives ==
The Longs have four children, two girls and two boys. Their oldest daughter, Abigail, plays college basketball for the Yale Bulldogs. Their youngest daughter, Mary, played one season of college soccer for the Duke Blue Devils before signing with the Kansas City Current.
