= Carondelet High School =

School in Concord, California, US

Location
- 1133 Winton Drive; Concord, California; United States; 37°56′2″N 122°1′59″W

Information
- Type: Private, all-female
- Religious affiliations: Roman Catholic (Sisters of St. Joseph)
- Established: 1965
- Founder: Congregation of the Sisters of St. Joseph
- Sister school: De La Salle High School
- President: Jessica Mix
- Grades: 9-12
- Enrollment: 800
- Campus size: 19 acres (77,000 m^{2})
- Colors: Red and White
- Athletics conference: CIF North Coast Section
- Mascot: Cougar
- Nickname: Cougars
- Publication: Carondeletter
- Yearbook: Kaleidoscope
- Affiliation: Western Association of Schools and Colleges.
- Website: www.carondeleths.org

Carondelet High School is an all-girls private Catholic high school in Concord, California, United States. Carondelet High School was founded in 1965 by the Sisters of Saint Joseph. The school enrolls about 800 students. It shares some resources with the all-boys De La Salle High School, which is across a side-street that separates them. De La Salle High School was founded by the Christian Brothers. Students in their junior and senior years are able to take classes at the other school for four of the school's six class periods, and also as lowerclassmen for language and art. The school is located within the Diocese of Oakland.

== History ==
Carondelet was founded in 1965, by the Sisters of Saint Joseph of Carondelet. as suggested by the first Bishop of Oakland, California, Bishop Floyd Begin of Oakland. At that time, Carondelet was the only Catholic high school for girls in Contra Costa County. It opened in September 1965, consisting of only six classrooms and six teachers, three sisters and three lay women. The freshman class was of only 115 young women.

The school was completed on October 22, 1966, and was dedicated to Bishop Floyd Begin.

In September 1969, Carondelet established a cooperative academic program with De La Salle High School, the all-boys Roman Catholic campus located across the street. Thus, Carondelet expanded their academics by allowing juniors and seniors from both schools to attend selected classes from either campus.

== Notable alumni ==
- Angelina Anderson, Class of 2019, professional soccer player
- Jayne Appel, Class of 2006, Stanford basketball team, WNBA San Antonio Silver Stars
- Natalie Coughlin, Class of 2000, Olympic swimming champion and 12-time medalist
- Nancy O'Malley Class of 1971, District Attorney of Alameda County
- Tiffany Roberts, Class of 1995, U.S. women's soccer team
- Marcie Ward, Class of 2000, soccer player
