= Sarah Kate Noftsinger =

American soccer executive and former player

Personal information
- Full name: Sarah Katherine Noftsinger
- Date of birth: March 4, 1980 (age 46)
- Place of birth: Richmond, Virginia, United States
- Height: 5 ft 3 in (1.60 m)
- Position: Midfielder

College career
Years	Team	Apps	(Gls)
1998–2001	Wake Forest Demon Deacons	81	(12)

Senior career*
Years	Team	Apps	(Gls)
2002	New York Power	0	(0)
2002–2003	Washington Freedom	5	(0)
- * Club domestic league appearances and goals

Sarah Katherine Noftsinger is a retired American soccer player who played as a midfielder for the Washington Freedom. She was most recently the VP for Atlanta United FC.

== Soccer career ==
While studying at Wake Forest University, she played for the school's soccer team.

On February 11, 2002, Noftsinger was selected in the 2002 WUSA draft by the New York Power. She joined the Washington Freedom in June 2002.

== Honors ==
Washington Freedom

- WUSA Founders Cup: 2003
