= Stephanie Rigamat =

American soccer player (born 1979)

Personal information
- Date of birth: August 5, 1979 (age 47)
- Place of birth: La Crescenta-Montrose, California, U.S.
- Height: 5 ft 3 in (1.60 m)
- Position: Forward

Youth career
- –1997: Crescenta Valley Falcons
- Las Virgenes Blazers
- West Coast Shamrocks

College career
Years	Team	Apps	(Gls)
1997–1998	UC Irvine Anteaters	42	(22)
2000–2001	UCLA Bruins	47	(26)

Senior career*
Years	Team	Apps	(Gls)
2002	Washington Freedom	6	(0)

International career
- United States U21
2001	United States	7	(1)

Managerial career
- 2003: UCLA Bruins (assistant)
- 2004–2006: UNLV Rebels (assistant)
- 2008–2010: New Mexico State Aggies (assistant)
- 2015–2017: Creighton Bluejays (assistant)
- * Club domestic league appearances and goals

Stephanie Rigamat (born August 5, 1979) is an American former soccer player who played as a forward, making seven appearances for the United States women's national team.

== Career ==
Rigamat played for the Crescenta Valley Falcons in high school, finishing as the school's recorded scorer with 109 goals and helping the team to win two league championships. In college, she played for the UC Irvine Anteaters from 1997 to 1998. She received All-Big West first team honors in 1997 and 1998, and was included in the All-West Region first team in 1997 (NSCAA) and third team in 1998 (Soccer Buzz). In total, she scored 22 goals and recorded 11 assists in 42 appearances for the Anteaters. She later joined the UCLA Bruins, playing for the team in 2000 and 2001 after redshirting during the 1999 season. She was a letter-winner at the school, and scored 26 goals and recorded 15 assists in 47 appearances for the Bruins. She was an NSCAA Second-Team All-American in 2001, and was a Soccer America MVP in 2000. Rigamat was also included in the All-Pac-10 Selection in 2001, the NSCAA All-Region team in 2001 (third), as well as the Soccer Buzz All-Region team in 2000 (third) and 2001 (first). She was a finalist for the Hermann Trophy in 2001. She had also played for the club teams Las Virgenes Blazers and West Coast Shamrocks.

Rigamat was a member of the U.S. under-21 national team. She made her international debut for the United States on January 11, 2001 in a friendly match against China PR. In total, she made seven appearances for the U.S. and scored one goal, earning her final cap on March 17, 2001 in the 2001 Algarve Cup against Norway.

Rigamat was selected by the Washington Freedom in the 2002 WUSA draft, making six appearances for the team during the 2002 WUSA season. The following year, she began her coaching career, serving as a volunteer assistant for her alma mater UCLA Bruins during the 2003 season. She later worked as an assistant for the UNLV Rebels from 2004 to 2006, the New Mexico State Aggies from 2008 to 2010, and the Creighton Bluejays from 2015 to 2017.

== Personal life ==
Rigamat was born and grew up in La Crescenta-Montrose, California. She earned her bachelor's degree in sociology from the University of California, Los Angeles in 2001.

== Career statistics ==
=== International ===
United States
Year	Apps	Goals
2001	7	1
Total	7	1

=== International goals ===
No.	Date	Location	Opponent	Score	Result	Competition
1	March 13, 2001	Silves, Portugal	Portugal	1–0	2–0	2001 Algarve Cup
