= Sarah Thygesen =

Danish association football player

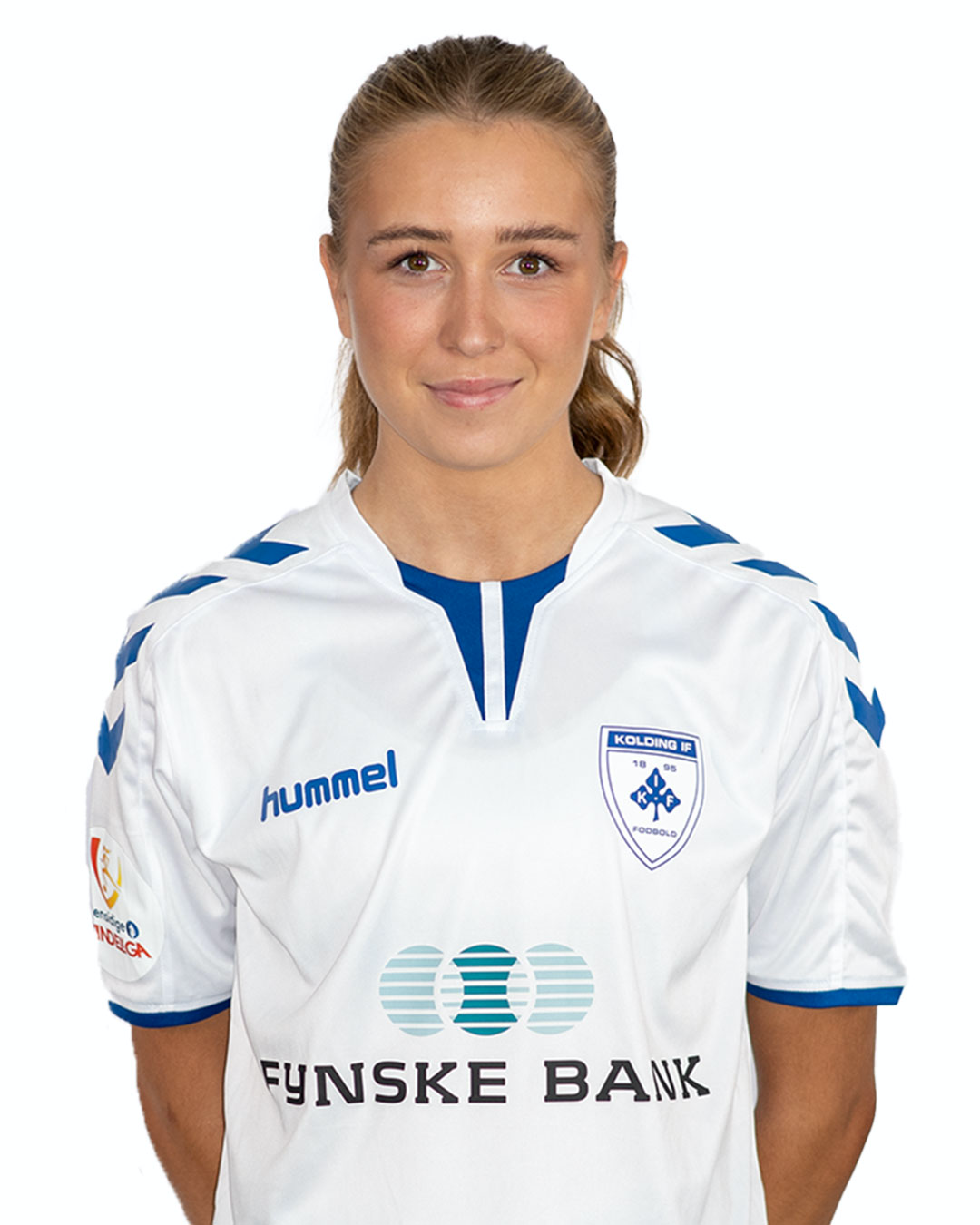
- Thygesen in 2021

Personal information
- Full name: Sarah Katrine Thygesen
- Date of birth: 8 November 2003 (age 22)
- Place of birth: Esbjerg, Denmark
- Height: 1.66 m (5 ft 5 in)
- Position: Midfielder

Team information
- Current team: HB Køge
- Number: 12

Youth career
- –2021: Kolding IF

Senior career*
Years	Team	Apps	(Gls)
2021–2023	Kolding IF	45	(2)
2024–	HB Køge	85	(18)

International career^{‡}
2021–	Denmark	1	(0)
- * Club domestic league appearances and goals as of 09:24, 5 November 2026 (UTC) ‡ National team caps and goals as of 09:24, 5 November 2026 (UTC)

Sarah Katrine Thygesen (born 5 November 2003) is a Danish footballer who plays as a midfielder for HB Køge and the Denmark national team.

== Club career ==
Thygesen came on as a substitute to score the third goal in a 4–1 victory to win HB Køge their first ever Danish Cup on 16 May 2026.

== International career ==
Thygesen has represented Denmark at youth level. In 2021 Thygesen made her senior debut for Denmark.

== Honours ==
=== HB Køge ===
- Danish Cup
  - Winners: 2025-26
