= Alberte Vingum =

Danish soccer goalkeeper (born 2004)

Personal information
- Full name: Albert Vingum Andersen
- Date of birth: 14 November 2004 (age 21)
- Height: 1.83 m (6 ft 0 in)
- Position: Goalkeeper

Team information
- Current team: HB Køge
- Number: 1

Youth career
- 2011-2020: TPI Football
- 2020-2021: Odense Q

Senior career*
Years	Team	Apps	(Gls)
2021–	HB Køge		

International career^{‡}
2019–2020	Denmark U16	4	(0)
2021–2023	Denmark U19	23	(0)
2023–	Denmark U23	3	(0)
2024–	Denmark	1	(0)
- * Club domestic league appearances and goals ‡ National team caps and goals as of 14 May 2026

Alberte Vingum Andersen (born 14 November 2004) is a Danish football player who plays as a goalkeeper for A-Liga side HB Køge and the Denmark national team.

== Club career ==
She has previously played for the childhood club TPI Fodbold, and later Odense Q, at a higher level.

In September 2021, Vingum signed with defending Danish champions HB Køge as the second goalkeeper. On 29 May 2022, she made her official debut for the first team in a play-off match in the Gjensidige Kvindeligaen against FC Thy-Thisted Q with the result 5–2 in Køge's favour. With Køge she won the Danish Cup in 2026 following their 4–1 victory against FC Nordsjælland.

== International career ==
She has appeared several times for the Danish youth national teams and for the qualification for the U/19 European Championship.

The day after her debut for HB Køge, on 31 May 2022, she was selected for the first time for the senior national team, for an official friendly match against Austria in Wiener Neustadt, included as third choice.

== Honors ==
- Elitedivsionen:
  - Winner (1): 2022
- Danish Cup:
  - Winner (1): 2026
