= Bai Lili =

Chinese footballer

Personal information
- Full name: Bai Lili
- Date of birth: October 29th 1978
- Place of birth: Shanghai, China
- Height: 5 ft 6 in (1.68 m)

International career^{‡}
Years	Team	Apps	(Gls)
2004	China	2	(0)
Medal record
Women's football
Representing China
Asian Games
Silver medal – second place	2002 Busan	Team
- ‡ National team caps and goals as of 25 Jan 2008 16:41 UTC

Bai Lili (Chinese: 白莉莉; pinyin: Bái Lìlì; born October 29, 1978) is a female Chinese football (soccer) player who competed at the 2004 Summer Olympics. In 2004, she finished ninth with the Chinese team in the women's tournament. She played in both matches. 2001 Asian Cup Bronze Medal, score 3 goals in the final of 3rd against Korea Republic.

2002 The Asian Game Silver Medal.

2005 Asian Cup Champion, played 4 matches.

== International goals ==
Scores and results list China's goal tally first.

No.	Date	Venue	Opponent	Score	Result	Competition
1.	9 September 2001	Chicago, United States	Japan	2–0	3–0	2001 Women's U.S. Cup
2.	9 September 2001	Chicago, United States	Japan	3–0	3–0	2001 Women's U.S. Cup
