= Bonnie Young =

American soccer player

Personal information
- Date of birth: July 21, 1980 (age 46)
- Place of birth: Baltimore, Maryland, United States
- Height: 5 ft 8 in (1.73 m)
- Position: Defender

College career
Years	Team	Apps	(Gls)
1998–2001	Penn State Nittany Lions	104	(31)

Senior career*
Years	Team	Apps	(Gls)
2004–2006	New Jersey Wildcats	32	(5)
2007–2008	Sky Blue FC	18	(1)
2009	Chicago Red Stars		
2010	Chicago Red Eleven		
- * Club domestic league appearances and goals

Bonnie Young (born July 21, 1980) is an American former soccer player. She played collegiately for Penn State. She was drafted to the New York Power in 2002. During her career she played for the New Jersey Wildcats, Sky Blue FC, and the Chicago Red Stars. While still playing, she started her coaching career.

== Early life ==
Young was born in Baltimore, Maryland, and grew up in Spring, Texas. Growing up she played multiple sports, and then she narrowed it down to soccer and basketball in high school. For college she chose soccer because it gave her greater options.

Her father, Bob, played in the NFL. Her grandfather, Bobby Young, played in MLB. Her mother, Betty, was a three-time field hockey All-American.

== Playing career ==
=== High School ===
Young pulled double duty playing for Klein High School and her club team, Klein Challenge SC. Both teams were nationally ranked during her time playing for them. She was Houston Chronicle Player of the Year in 1996 and 1997.

=== College ===
Young played for the Penn State Nittany Lions women's soccer team from 1998 to 2001. She played as a forward her freshman and sophomore year, then she was converted to a defender for her junior and senior year. She scored the first hat-trick in school history as a freshman. She earned numerous accolades in college, including being named to the First Team All-Big Ten as well as Outstanding Defensive Player of the Year for Penn State in 2000 and 2001. She was an All-Mid-Atlantic Region pick in 2001 as well as being named to the Mid-Atlantic Region All-Freshman team in 1998. With 104 games played, Young still holds the record for most games played for Penn State and is tied for sixth overall in the NCAA (as of January 2023). She earned a Bachelor of Science degree in kinesiology.

=== Club ===
Young was drafted fourteen overall by the New York Power in the 2002 Women's United Soccer Association draft. She played for the New Jersey Wildcats and Sky Blue FC in the USL W-League. She won the W-League Championship in 2005 with the New Jersey Wildcats. She played for the Chicago Red Stars in the Women's Professional Soccer league and its affiliated USL W-League team Chicago Red Eleven.

== Coaching career ==
Young has coached at the youth, college, and professional levels in the United States. She has coached at Rhode Island University, Monmouth University, and North Central College. She was an assistant coach for the Chicago Red Stars in the National Women's Soccer League. She most recently coached at Metropolitan State University of Denver.

=== Credentials ===
In addition to a B.S. in kinesiology, Young has a Master of Science degree in human movement and corrective exercises. She is also a certified strength and conditioning specialist. She has both a Premier Diploma and Director of Coaching Diploma from the National Soccer Coaches Association of America, and she has a "B" License from U.S. Soccer.
