= Samantha Williams =

American soccer player (born 2001)

Personal information
- Full name: Samantha Magdalena Williams
- Date of birth: December 3, 2001 (age 24)
- Place of birth: Torrance, California, U.S.
- Height: 5 ft 4 in (1.63 m)
- Position: Forward

Team information
- Current team: HB Køge
- Number: 14

Youth career
- West Coast FC
- 2016–2020: SoCal Blues

College career
Years	Team	Apps	(Gls)
2021–2024	Stanford Cardinal	85	(14)

Senior career*
Years	Team	Apps	(Gls)
2025–	HB Køge	1	(0)
- * Club domestic league appearances and goals as of 13:44, August 3, 2026 (UTC)

Samantha Magdalena Williams (born December 3, 2001) is an American professional soccer player who plays as a forward for A-Liga club HB Køge. She played college soccer for the Stanford Cardinal.

== Early life ==
Williams was born in Torrance, California, as one of three children born to David and Caroline Williams. She grew up in Laguna Beach, where she started playing club soccer for West Coast FC. Williams later joined the SoCal Blues, where she contributed to 4 ECNL national championships. She also had experience with multiple Olympic Development Program teams.

A student at JSerra Catholic High School, Williams played for the school's soccer team and stepped into the striker role vacated by graduate Izzy D'Aquila. Despite missing a portion of her sophomore season due to a knee fracture and concussion, Williams managed to win two team MVP awards and earn recognition as a 2019 Allstate All-American. She also helped JSerra win three CIF State titles and two league titles. Williams had a particularly successful senior year, recording 17 goals and 12 assists; the Orange County Register later named her its girls soccer player of the year.

== College career ==
Williams played five seasons for the Stanford Cardinal. She kicked off her collegiate career on a positive note, leading Stanford in goal contributions, becoming one of the team's top scorers, and landing a spot on the All Pac-12 Freshman team. Her first college goal came on February 28, 2021, in a 2–1 loss to Oregon State. Over her next four years at Stanford, Williams made 71 additional appearances and also scored 10 times. The bulk of her offensive production occurred in her junior year, in which she netted a career-high 7 goals and registered a team-high 6 assists. 2 of those goals and 3 of the assists all took place in a particularly auspicious 4-match run near the end of conference play. Her goal against Cal on November 4, 2022 helped secure the Cardinal's spot in the 2022 NCAA tournament. During the tournament, Stanford were able to reach the championship match, but they were defeated by Florida State. In her fifth year, Williams contributed to yet another strong college cup run, but Stanford were eliminated in the semifinals this time.

== Club career ==
After playing for Stanford, Williams joined the Kansas City Current II squad that competed at the Soccer Tournament 2025. She then signed her first professional contract with Danish club HB Køge on July 24, 2025. Her move to Køge bolstered a strong American contingent within the squad, which included her former Stanford and Current II teammate Avani Brandt. Williams sustained a serious injury shortly after joining the club and returned to the United States for her recovery. After over a year since signing for Køge, she made her professional debut, coming on as a substitute against ASA Aarhus on August 1, 2026.

== Career statistics ==
=== Club ===
As of August 3, 2025

Appearances and goals by club, season and competition
Club	Season	League			Cup		Playoffs		Total	
Club	Season	Division	Apps	Goals	Apps	Goals	Apps	Goals	Apps	Goals
HB Køge	2025–26	A-Liga	0	0	0	0	—		0	0
Career total			0	0	0	0	0	0	0	0

== Honors ==
Stanford Cardinal

- Pac-12 Conference: 2022

HB Køge

- Danish Women's Cup: 2026

Individual

- Pac-12 all-freshman team: 2020
