= Nadia Kjældgaard =

Danish footballer (born 1978)

Personal information
- Full name: Nadia Borch Kjældgaard
- Date of birth: 2 November 1978 (age 47)
- Position: Midfielder

Youth career
- –1997: Jyderup BK

Senior career*
Years	Team	Apps	(Gls)
1998–2000	Hillerød GI		
2000–2002	HEI		
2002	IK Skovbakken		
2002–2004	OB		
2004–	Vejle B	24	

International career
1995	Denmark	7	(2)
1996–1999	Denmark	24	(4)
1999–2005	Denmark	36	(3)
- * Club domestic league appearances and goals

Nadia Borch Kjældgaard (born 2 November 1978) is a Danish retired footballer who played as a midfielder for the Danish national team. At club level, represented Hillerød GI, HEI (and later Skovbakken when they merged), OB, and Vejle B before retiring her active playing career.

== International career ==
Kjældgaard was part of the Danish national team at the 2001 European Championships.
