= Danielle Borgman =

American soccer player (born 1980)

Personal information
- Full name: Danielle Lynn Borgman
- Date of birth: April 25, 1980 (age 46)
- Place of birth: Cincinnati, Ohio, United States
- Height: 5 ft 5 in (1.65 m)
- Position: Defender

Youth career
- Hammer FC

College career
Years	Team	Apps	(Gls)
1998–2001	North Carolina Tar Heels		

Senior career*
Years	Team	Apps	(Gls)
2002	San Jose CyberRays	14	(0)
2003	Carolina Courage	17	(2)

International career
1997–2000	United States	2	(0)
- * Club domestic league appearances and goals

Danielle Lynn Borgman (born April 25, 1980) is an American former professional soccer defender. She played professionally for the San Jose CyberRays. She also played for the United States women's national soccer team in the summer of 2000 as a member of the under-21 team and received a gold medal. She was ranked as one of the nation's fasted players.

== Career ==
She previously played at the college level for the University of North Carolina Tar Heels. She started 52 games for them and was a first team All-American choice as a sophomore.

In her club soccer years, she played for the Hammer Football Club in Cincinnati, Ohio and played as a forward and midfielder. She became captain in 1996. In the same year she was named to the United States under-16 national team during her first year playing in the Olympic Development Program. In 1997, she was named to the All-Star Team at the U.S. Soccer Festival in Minnesota and was also a member for the u-17 National Team.
