= Thomas Sandell =

Swedish hedge fund manager

- Born: 1960 or 1961 (age 65–66)
- Education: Uppsala University; Columbia University
- Occupation: Hedge fund manager
- Spouse: Married
- Children: 2

Thomas Sandell (born 1960/1961) is a billionaire Swedish hedge fund manager, based in London.

== Early life ==
He earned a bachelor's degree from Uppsala University. He then spent 2 years in Paris covering European stocks for Atlantic Finance. He then earned an MBA in finance from Columbia University.

== Career ==
Sandell worked as a securities analyst for Atlantic Finance in Paris from May 1986 to May 1987 and subsequently was head of equity research at Group Delphi in Paris.

Sandell joined Bear Stearns in 1988, and was a colleague of investment banker Ace Greenberg. When he left in 1997 he was a senior managing director and co-head of the Risk Arbitrage department.

In 1998, Sandell set up Sandell Asset Management, a hedge fund with its headquarters in New York.

The company's business focus on global risk arbitrage, equity special situations and credit opportunities. Its UCITS hedge fund was awarded Best Performing Risk Arbitrage Fund by The Hedge Fund Journal and was included in "The Hedge Fund Hot 100".

== Other ==
Sandell is a founding board member of The New Leader's Group of the Institute of International Education, the administrator of the United States Government's Fulbright Program. He is also a Trustee of Friends of ARK (Absolute Return for Kids), a charity focused on supporting a variety of initiatives that fight disease, abuse and poverty afflicting children around the globe.

== Personal life ==
He is married, with one child, and lives in London, England.
