= Maria Uhre Nielsen =

Danish footballer (born 1999)

Maria Uhre
Personal information
- Full name: Maria Uhre Nielsen
- Date of birth: 5 October 1999 (age 27)
- Place of birth: Kolding, Denmark
- Height: 1.71 m (5 ft 7 in)
- Position: Defender

Team information
- Current team: HB Køge
- Number: 2

Youth career
- Rishøj Boldklub
- Herfølge BK
- Brøndby IF
- Greve Fodbold
- Damsø

Senior career*
Years	Team	Apps	(Gls)
2018–	HB Køge	183	(15)
- * Club domestic league appearances and goals as of 21:26, 29 October 2026 (UTC)

Maria Uhre Nielsen (born 5 October 1999) is a Danish footballer who plays as a defender for the Danish A-Liga club HB Køge.

== Club career ==
=== HB Køge ===
In July 2020, at the age of 21, Uhre signed the first professional contract in HB Køge women's team history in the A-Liga, the top tier of the Danish Women's Football League. Uhre was appointed Køge captain in June 2020. Uhre scored in the opening match of the league on 9 August 2020, in a 7–2 defeat against AaB Fodbold.

The following year, in 2021, HB Køge won their first Danish Championship in their first season in the Elitedivisionen. They also made it for the semifinal in the Danish Women's Cup 2020, but got kicked out of the tournament due to an overall 4–5 victory to Brøndby IF. Uhre was one of the key players on the court to secure the title. She also made her first appearance in the 2021-22 UEFA Women's Champions League, in the 2–0 win against Sparta Prague, on 8 September 2021. She was substituted in the 93rd minute, as replacement for Kyra Carusa.

In March 2026 Uhre signed a hitherto unprecedented 5-year contract extension with HB Køge.

== Honours ==
- A-Liga
  - Winner: 2021
- Danish Women's Cup
  - Winner (1): 2026
  - Semifinalist: 2021
