= HB Køge (women) =

Danish football club

HB Køge Women
- Full name: HB Køge Women
- Nickname: Svanerne (The Swans)
- Short name: HBKW
- Founded: 2009; 17 years ago
- Ground: Køge Stadium
- Capacity: 8,000 (3,440 seated)
- Owner: Ballard Capital
- Manager: Kristian Mørch
- League: A-Liga
- 2025–26: A-Liga, 1st of 8 (champions)
- Website: HB Køge Official Site
Home colours	Away colours	colours

HB Køge Women (Danish: HB Køge Kvinder, commonly known as HB Køge) is a Danish women's football club based in Køge, Denmark. Founded in 2009 as HB Køge Pigefodbold, the club plays in A-Liga, the top tier of the Danish Women's Football League. Like the men's team, which is under different ownership, they play their home matches at Køge Stadium.

== History ==
In January 2020, the club entered into partnership with Capelli Sport and the American Football Academy Slammers FC. The goal for the team was to participate in the UEFA Women's Champions League within five years and in the women's section receive the same terms as the men's team. The former football player and success coach from Brøndby IF Peer Lisdorf, was hired as new head coach for the team. In their first season in the Elitedivisionen, Lisdorf successfully led the club to Champions League qualification for the first time in their history, whilst also winning their first top-flight title.

On 27 May 2025, Capelli Sport sold its stake in the women's club to Ballard Capital, an investment company owned and operated by Angie and Chris Long, owners of the American professional club Kansas City Current competing in the National Women's Soccer League. The acquisition fully separated the women's club's business from the men's club's, and the new owners re-hired former general manager Walid Khoury as the club's chief executive officer and sporting director.

HB Køge won their first ever Danish Cup on 16 May 2026 following their 4–1 victory against FC Nordsjælland. The club's home record was topped in the 29 October 2026 Champions League match against FC Barcelona at Køge Stadium with 5,884 spectators.

== Players ==
=== Current squad ===
As of 25 September 2026

Note: Flags indicate national team as defined under FIFA eligibility rules; some limited exceptions apply. Players may hold more than one non-FIFA nationality.

No.	Pos.	Nation	Player
1	GK	DEN	Alberte Vingum
2	DF	DEN	Maria Uhre (vice-captain)
3	FW	USA	Macy Schultz
4	DF	JPN	Yukina Sakabe
5	DF	USA	Sydney Jones
6	MF	JPN	Aemu Oyama
7	FW	IRL	Kyra Carusa
8	FW	DEN	Mai Wendicke
9	FW	DEN	Nadia Nadim
10	FW	ZAM	Mercy Chipasula
12	DF	DEN	Sarah Thygesen
13	MF	USA	Catherine Paulson
14	FW	USA	Samantha Williams
15	DF	DEN	Ida Jørgensen
17	MF	DEN	Rikke Madsen
18		DEN	Shakia Wilson Crüger
20	FW	DEN	Bodil Gantzhorn
21	MF	ALB	Nadia Tahirukaj

No.	Pos.	Nation	Player
22	FW	ISL	Emelía Óskarsdóttir
23	MF	DEN	Mille Gejl (captain)
24	MF	DEN	Laura Hermann
25	FW	DEN	Augusta Callesen
27	DF	DEN	Andrea Termansen
28	DF	DEN	Simone Boye
29	FW	POL	Julia Ostrowska
30	GK	DEN	Emilie Møller
31	FW	SWE	Kaia Carruthers
32	DF	USA	Emma Flick
33	MF	KEN	Jereko
34	FW	POL	Lidia Kulka
35	MF	DEN	Molly Nygaard
36	FW	DEN	Astrid Baltersen
66	GK	USA	Lauren Kozal
77	FW	POL	Julia Gutowska
88	FW	POL	Zuzanna Witek
—	FW	DEN	Alma Hansen

==== Out on loan ====
Note: Flags indicate national team as defined under FIFA eligibility rules; some limited exceptions apply. Players may hold more than one non-FIFA nationality.

No.	Pos.	Nation	Player
20	DF	DEN	Andrea Friis (at OB Q until 31 December 2026)

=== Player records ===
As of 10 November 2026

Current players highlighted in bold

==== Caps ====
#	Nat.	Player	Caps
1	(Denmark)	**Maria Uhre**	186
2	(Denmark)	Selma Svendsen	122
3	(Denmark)	Signe Markvardsen	100
4	(Republic of Ireland)	**Kyra Carusa**	98
5	(Denmark)	Cecilie Fløe	93
6	(Denmark)	**Alberte Vingum**	91
7	(United States)	Maddie Pokorny	90
8	(Denmark)	**Sarah Thygesen**	86
9	(Denmark)	Cornelia Kramer	74
10	(Denmark)	Laura Guldbjerg	65

=== Captains ===
Incomplete

Captaincy	Player
2025–	(Denmark) Mille Gejl
2023–2025	(Denmark) Maria Uhre
2021–2023	(Republic of Ireland) Kyra Carusa
2019–2021	(Denmark) Maria Uhre

== Management ==
=== Coaching ===
As of 28 July 2026

Position	Name
Head Coach	(Denmark) Kristian Mørch
Assistant Coach	(Denmark) Michael Hjortkjær
First Team Coach	(Denmark) Rikke Sevecke
First Team Coach	(Denmark) Peter Hagenbo
Goalkeeping Coach	(Denmark) Claes de Flon
Fitness Coach	(Denmark) Mathilde Kramer
First Team Analyst	(Venezuela) Alejandro Addeo
Team Manager	(Denmark) Lars Sørensen
Physiotherapist	(Denmark) Theis Raagaard

=== Club ===
As of 3 September 2025

Position	Name
Owners	(United States) Ballard Capital
Sporting Director	(Denmark) Jonas Nielsen
Senior Financial Controller	(Denmark) Kim Scharbau
Operations Manager	(Denmark) Thorina-Joy Schroeter

== Seasons ==
As of the 2025–26 season

For the top division, the table lists the results of the regular season, but the final position achieved.
Incomplete

Key
(gold) Champions	Promotion
(silver) Silver	Relegation
(bronze) Bronze	

Season	Tier	#	W	D	L	F	A	Pts.	Cup	UWCL
As Køge Boldklub
1996–97	2	8th of 8	1	1	11	9	49	4		
2001–02	4	3rd of 12	8	0	3	30	15	24		

"Årsberetning 2002" (PDF). Dansk Boldspil-Union. 1 January 2003. p. 76.

== Honours ==
Incomplete

HB Køge honours
Honour	No.	Years
A-Liga	4	(gold) 2020–21, 2021–22, 2022–23, 2025–26
A-Liga	2	(bronze) 2023–24, 2024–25
Danish Cup	1	(gold) 2025–26

== European ==
Results list HB Køge's goal tally first

=== Champions League (2001–) ===
==== Competition ====
Season	Stage	Opponent	Result	
CHAMPIONS LEAGUE
2021–22	R16	(Germany) 1899 Hoffenheim	0–5; 1–2	1–7
2021–22	R16	(Spain) Barcelona	0–5; 0–2	0–7
2021–22	R16	(England) Arsenal	0–3; 1–5	1–8
2026–27	R32	(England) Arsenal	0–1	
2026–27	R32	(Switzerland) Servette Chênois	5–1	
2026–27	R32	(Spain) Barcelona	0–8	
2026–27	R32	(Belgium) OH Leuven	1–1	

==== Qualification ====
Season	Stage	Opponent	Result
2021–22	QR 2		
2021–22	QR 2	(Czech Republic) Sparta Prague	3–0
2022–23	QR 2	(Italy) Juventus	1–3
2023–24	Round 1	(Finland) KuPS	1–2
2023–24	Round 1	(Faroe Islands) KÍ	3–1
2026–27	QR 2	(Latvia) Riga FC	4–1
2026–27	QR 2	(Scotland) Heart of Midlothian	2–1
2026–27	QR 2	(Netherlands) PSV	2–1

=== Overview ===
Competition	Played	Won	Drew	Lost	GF	GA	GD	Win%
UEFA Women's Champions League	13	4	1	8	14	29	−15	30.77
Total	13	4	1	8	14	29	−15	30.77
