= Aly Wagner =

American soccer player and broadcaster (born 1980)

- Wagner in 2026

Personal information
- Full name: Alyson Kay Wagner
- Date of birth: August 10, 1980 (age 46)
- Place of birth: San Jose, California, U.S.
- Height: 5 ft 5 in (1.65 m)
- Position: Midfielder

College career
Years	Team	Apps	(Gls)
1998–2002	Santa Clara Broncos		

Senior career*
Years	Team	Apps	(Gls)
2003	San Diego Spirit	20	(2)
2004	Boston Breakers	0	(0)
2005	Olympique Lyonnais	3	(2)
2009	Los Angeles Sol	15	(0)

International career^{‡}
1998–2008	United States	131	(21)
Medal record
Women's football
Representing the United States
Olympic Games
Gold medal – first place	2004 Athens	Team
Gold medal – first place	2008 Beijing	Team
FIFA Women's World Cup
Bronze medal – third place	2003 USA	Team
Bronze medal – third place	2007 China	Team
- * Club domestic league appearances and goals as of 22:37, 30 September 2009 (UTC) ‡ National team caps and goals as of 22:37, 30 September 2009 (UTC)

Alyson Kay Wagner (born August 10, 1980) is an American sports broadcaster and retired soccer midfielder who was a member of the United States women's national soccer team. She is a two-time Olympic gold medalist and two-time FIFA Women's World Cup bronze medalist. She has worked for Fox Sports, CBS Sports, and ESPN as a soccer analyst. She is the first woman to call a FIFA Men's World Cup game on English-language U.S. television, serving as the analyst alongside Derek Rae for Iran's 1–0 win against Morocco on June 15, 2018. She was also an owner of the USL Championship club Queensboro FC that never got off the ground, and she is a founding owner and co-chair of Bay FC, the National Women's Soccer League expansion club awarded to the San Francisco Bay Area in 2023.

== Early life ==
Born and raised in San Jose, California, Wagner attended Hillbrook School, and later, Presentation High School and was a four-year varsity starter on the soccer team. She helped the Panthers win the Central Coast Championship as a sophomore and senior. She was named CCS Player of the Year as a junior and senior and was selected as League MVP during her freshman, sophomore and junior years. As a senior, she was named NSCAA All-American, Parade All-American, Parade Magazine High School Player of the Year, and the Gatorade National High School Player of the Year. She was also named as the Northern California Student-Athlete of the Year and Presentation Scholar Athlete of the Year the same year.

=== Santa Clara Broncos, 1998–2002 ===
Wagner began playing with the United States women's national soccer team in 1998, while still a freshman at Santa Clara University. She played in 23 games for the Broncos, starting 21, and scored 10 goals with 12 assists. She was named Second-Team NSCAA All-American, First-Team All-WCC and the WCC Freshman of the Year.

In 2001, she led Santa Clara to the NCAA Women's Soccer Championship, scoring the only goal in Santa Clara's 1–0 victory over perennial powerhouse North Carolina.

Wagner was awarded the 2002 Hermann Trophy as the top collegiate soccer player in the country and the Today's Top VIII Award as a member of the Class of 2002. She also won the Honda Sports Award as the nation's top soccer player.

== Playing career ==
=== Club ===
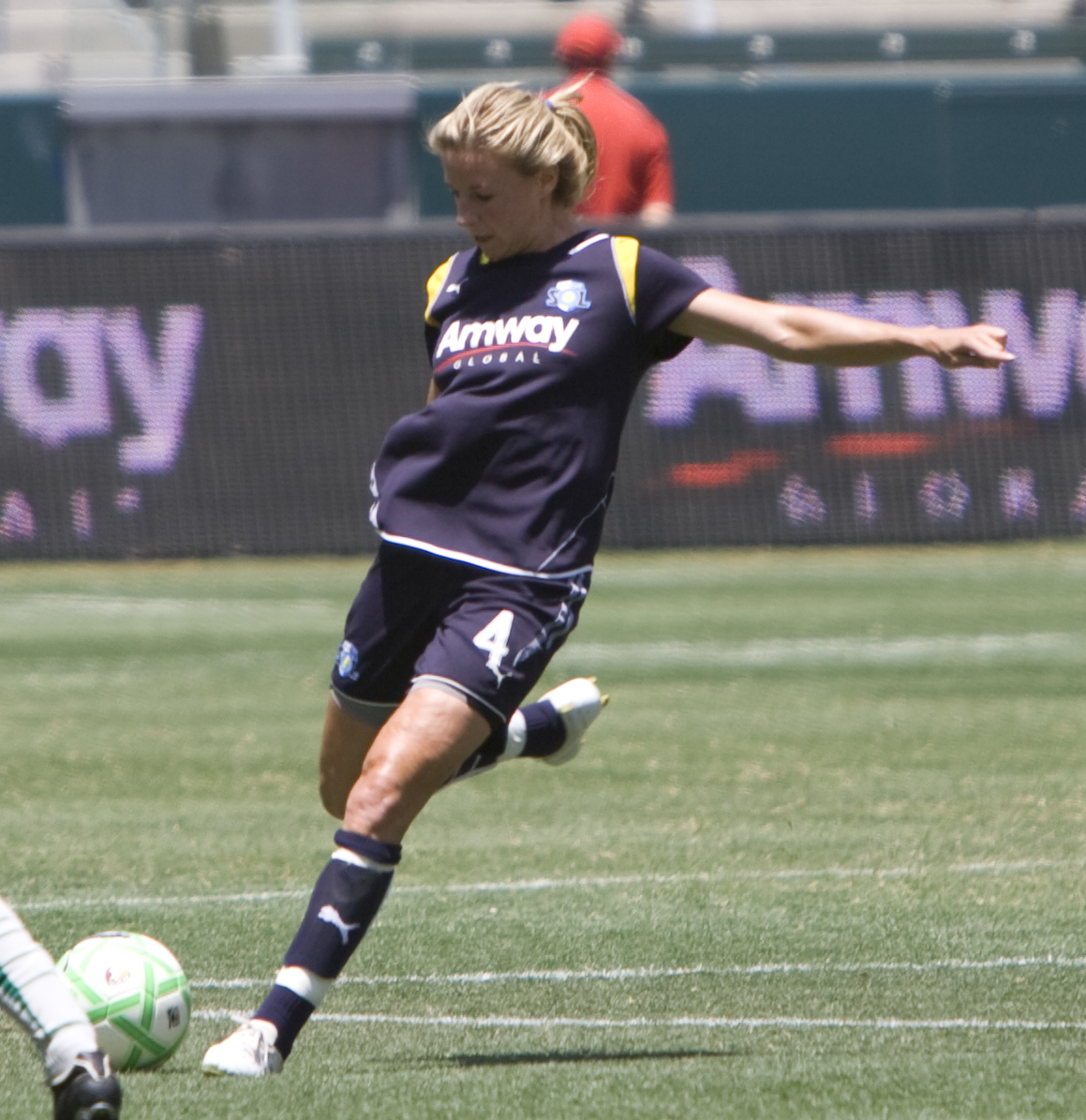
Wagner with the Los Angeles Sol in 2009

Wagner was the number one pick at the 2003 WUSA Draft by the San Diego Spirit. The team finished in third place during the 2003 WUSA season with a 8–6–7 record. She played in all 20 matches during the season, scored two goals and recorded four assists. After advancing to the playoffs, the Spirit was defeated by the Atlanta Beat 2–1 in the semifinals with Wagner scoring the Spirit's lone goal. Wagner was named to the All-WUSA Second Team following the season.

At the conclusion of the 2003 season, Wagner was traded to the Boston Breakers, shortly before the WUSA suspended operations. She made her debut for the Breakers in a June 19, 2004 exhibition match against the Washington Freedom in Blaine, Minnesota.

In 2005, Wagner scored twice in three games for Olympique Lyonnais in the French First Division.

In 2009, Wagner began playing midfielder for the Los Angeles Sol of Women's Professional Soccer (WPS).

On January 14, 2010, Wagner announced her retirement from professional soccer due to injuries.

=== International ===
Wagner competed for the United States women's national soccer team from 1999 to 2008. She made appearances in 131 international matches, scored 21 goals and made 42 assists.

At the 2003 FIFA Women's World Cup in the United States, Wagner made four appearances including three group-stage matches and the semi-final match. In 2004, she was selected for the Athens Olympics. She played in four matches including three group-stage matches and the semi-final match, helping the U.S. win gold. On July 30, 2006, she became the 18th U.S. women's national team player to reach 100 caps during a friendly match against Canada.

In 2007, Wagner was selected by head coach Greg Ryan for the 2007 FIFA Women's World Cup in China and competed in the third-place play-off match against Norway.

Despite undergoing a double hernia operation in early 2008, Wagner was selected to play at the 2008 Summer Olympics and made one appearance as a substitute in a group-stage match against New Zealand.

==== International goals ====
Key (expand for notes on "international goals" and sorting)
Location	Geographic location of the venue where the competition occurred Sorted by country name first, then by city name
Lineup	Start – played entire match on minute (off player) – substituted on at the minute indicated, and player was substituted off at the same time off minute (on player) – substituted off at the minute indicated, and player was substituted on at the same time (c) – captain Sorted by minutes played
Goal in match	Goal of total goals by the player in the match Sorted by total goals followed by goal number
Min	The minute in the match the goal was scored. For list that include caps, blank indicates played in the match but did not score a goal.
Assist/pass	The ball was passed by the player, which assisted in scoring the goal. This column depends on the availability and source of this information.
penalty or pk	Goal scored on penalty-kick which was awarded due to foul by opponent. (Goals scored in penalty-shoot-out, at the end of a tied match after extra-time, are not included.)
Score	The match score after the goal was scored. Sorted by goal difference, then by goal scored by the player's team
Result	The final score. Sorted by goal difference in the match, then by goal difference in penalty-shoot-out if it is taken, followed by goal scored by the player's team in the match, then by goal scored in the penalty-shoot-out. For matches with identical final scores, match ending in extra-time without penalty-shoot-out is a tougher match, therefore precede matches that ended in regulation
aet	The score at the end of extra-time; the match was tied at the end of 90' regulation
pso	Penalty-shoot-out score shown in parentheses; the match was tied at the end of extra-time
	Green background color – exhibition or closed door international friendly match
	Yellow background color – match at an invitational tournament
	Red background color – Olympic women's football qualification match
	Light-blue background color – FIFA women's world cup qualification match
	Orange background color – Continental Games or regional tournament
NOTE on background colors: Continental Games or regional tournament are sometimes also qualifier for World Cup or Olympics; information depends on the source such as the player's federation. NOTE: some keys may not apply for a particular football player

Goal	Date	Home away neutral	Location	Opponent	Lineup	Goal in match	Min	Assist /pass	Score	Result	Competition
goal 1	1999-04-29	home	Charlotte	Japan	on 46' (off Foudy)	1 of 1	51	Sara Whalen	5–0	9–0	Friendly
goal 2	2000-01-13	away	Adelaide	Australia	unknown	1 of 1	unknown	Heather Aldama	3–1	3–1	Australia Cup
goal 3	2000-04-05	home	Davidson	Iceland	Start	1 of 1	53	Danielle Slaton	3–0	8–0	Friendly
goal 4	2000-06-08	neutral	Newcastle	Japan	on 64' (off Foudy)	1 of 1	88	Christie Welsh	4–1	4–1	Pacific Cup
goal 5	2000-07-07	home	Central Islip	Italy	Start	1 of 1	24	Mary-Frances Monroe	1–0	4–1	Friendly
goal 6	2002-01-12	home	Charleston	Mexico	on 46' (off Parlow)	1 of 1	75	unassisted	6–0	7–0	Friendly
goal 7	2002-09-29	home	Uniondale	Russia	on 61' (off Foudy)	1 of 1	64	Kate Sobrero	5–0	5–1	U.S. Cup
goal 8	2002-10-27	home	Pasadena	Mexico	Start	1 of 1	5	Kristine Lilly	1–0	3–0	World Cup qualifier: Group A
goal 9	2003-03-14	neutral	Olhão	Canada	on 60' (off Tarpley)	1 of 1	85	unassisted	1–1	1–1	Algarve Cup: Group A
goal 10	2003-03-18	neutral	Santo Antonio	Sweden	off 75' (on Hucles)	1 of 1	18	unassisted	1–0	1–1	Algarve Cup: Group A
goal 11	2003-09-01	home	Carson	Costa Rica	off 46' (on Hamm)	1 of 1	17	Cindy Parlow	1–0	5–0	Friendly
goal 12	2003-09-07	home	San Jose	Mexico	on 61' (off Lilly)	1 of 1	85	penalty	5–0	5–0	Friendly
goal 13	2004-02-27	neutral	Heredia	Haiti	Start	1 of 1	12	Cindy Parlow	1–0	8–0	Olympic qualifier
goal 14	2004-03-03	away	San Jose	Costa Rica	Start	1 of 1	5	Kristine Lilly	1–0	4–0	Olympic qualifier
goal 15	2004-08-01	home	East Hartford	China	off 72' (on Tarpley)	1 of 1	14	Mia Hamm	1–0	3–1	Friendly
goal 16	2004-10-10	home	Cincinnati	New Zealand	Start	1 of 1	51	unassisted	3–0	6–0	Friendly
goal 17	2004-12-08	home	Carson	Mexico	off 75' (on Hucles)	1 of 2	8	Mia Hamm	1–0	5–0	Friendly
goal 18	2004-12-08	home	Carson	Mexico	off 75' (on Hucles)	2 of 2	66	Kristine Lilly	5–0	5–0	Friendly
goal 19	2005-07-10	home	Portland	Ukraine	off 64' (on Lloyd)	1 of 1	48	Kristine Lilly	3–0	7–0	Friendly
goal 20	2006-03-13	neutral	Faro	France	off 70' (on Miller)	1 of 1	49	Heather O'Reilly	2–0	4–1	Algarve Cup: Group B
goal 21	2006-08-27	home	Chicago	China	off 88' (on Hucles)	1 of 1	59	penalty	2–1	4–1	Friendly

==== Assists made in international matches ====
Wagner is among the top ten players of the United States women's national soccer team in providing assists. Wagner provided more assists than goals which is not unusual for a midfielder; however, a ratio of 42 assists to 21 goals is unmatched by any other player in the top ten assist providers of the United States women's national soccer team.

Assist	Date	N	Home away neutral	Location	Opponent	Lineup	Min	Goal scorer	Score	Result	Competition
assist 1	2000-01-07	0	neutral	Melbourne	Czech Republic	off 46' (on O'Reilly)	83	Veronica Zepeda	8–0	8–1	Australia Cup
assist 2	2000-07-07	1	home	Central Islip	Italy	Start	91+	Caroline Putz	4–1	4–1	Friendly
assist 3	2002-01-12	1	home	Charleston	Mexico	on 61' (off Foudy)	65	Danielle Fotopoulos	4–0	7–0	Friendly
assist 4	2002-03-03	0	neutral	Ferreiras	England	Start	59	Shannon MacMillan	1–0	2–0	Algarve Cup: Group B
assist 5	2002-03-03	0	neutral	Ferreiras	England	Start	75	Kelly Wilson	2–0	2–0	Algarve Cup: Group B
assist 6	2002-07-21	0	home	Blaine	Norway	Start	70	Tiffeny Milbrett	2–0	4–0	Friendly
assist 7	2002-09-29	1	home	Uniondale	Russia	on 46' (off Parlow )	59	Mia Hamm	3–0	5–1	Nike U.S. Cup
assist 8	2002-09-29	1	home	Uniondale	Russia	on 46' (off Parlow )	62	Mia Hamm	4–0	5–1	Nike U.S. Cup
assist 9	2002-11-02	0	home	Seattle	Panama	off 46' (on Foudy)	3	Tiffeny Milbrett	1–0	9–0	World Cup qualifier: Group A
assist 10	2002-11-02	0	home	Seattle	Panama	off 46' (on Foudy)	6	Tiffeny Milbrett	2–0	9–0	World Cup qualifier: Group A
assist 11	2002-11-02	0	home	Seattle	Panama	off 46' (on Foudy)	22	Tiffeny Milbrett	6–0	9–0	World Cup qualifier: Group A
assist 12	2002-11-06	0	home	Seattle	Costa Rica	Start	90	Kristine Lilly	7–0	7–0	World Cup qualifier: semifinal
assist 13	2002-11-09	0	home	Pasadena	Canada	Start	94	Mia Hamm	2–1	2–1	World Cup qualifier: final
assist 14	2003-01-23	1	neutral	Yiwu	Norway	on 88' (off Hawkins)	24	Thori Bryan	1–0	3–1	Four Nations Tournament
assist 15	2003-01-23	1	neutral	Yiwu	Norway	on 88' (off Hawkins)	64	Tiffeny Milbrett	2–1	3–1	Four Nations Tournament
assist 16	2003-01-23	1	neutral	Yiwu	Norway	on 88' (off Hawkins)	87	Heather O'Reilly	3–1	3–1	Four Nations Tournament
assist 17	2003-02-16	0	home	Charleston	Iceland	off 74' (on Kluegel)	3	Mia Hamm	1–0	1–0	Friendly
assist 18	2003-04-26	0	home	Washington	Canada	Start	55	Shannon MacMillan	4–1	6–1	Friendly
assist 19	2003-04-26	0	home	Washington	Canada	Start	78	Shannon MacMillan	5–1	6–1	Friendly
assist 20	2003-09-01	1	home	Carson	Costa Rica	off 46' (on Hamm)	17	Abby Wambach	2–0	5–0	Friendly
assist 21	2003-11-02	0	home	Dallas	Mexico	Start	18	Cindy Parlow	1–0	3–1	Friendly
assist 22	2004-02-25	0	home	San Jose	Costa Rica	on 46' (off Tarpley)	81	Shannon Boxx	7–0	5–0	Olympic qualifier
assist 23	2004-06-06	0	home	Louisville	Japan	on 46' (off Tarpley)	59	Abby Wambach	1–1	1–1	Friendly
assist 24	2004-09-25	0	home	Rochester	Iceland	on 46' (off Tarpley)	42	Abby Wambach	2–0	4–3	Friendly
assist 25	2004-10-10	0	home	Cincinnati	New Zealand	Start	66	Cindy Parlow	5–0	6–0	Friendly
assist 26	2004-10-16	0	home	Kansas City	Mexico	Start	36	Angela Hucles	1–0	1–0	Friendly
assist 27	2004-11-06	0	home	Philadelphia	Denmark	off 46' (on Hucles)	48	Abby Wambach	1–1	1–3	Friendly
assist 28	2005-03-09	0	neutral	Ferreiras	France	off 68' (on Hucles)	20	Christie Welsh	1–0	1–0	Algarve Cup: Group B
assist 29	2005-03-13	0	neutral	Santo Antonio	Denmark	off 46' (on Tarpley)	15	Abby Wambach	2–0	4–0	Algarve Cup: Group B
assist 30	2005-03-15	0	neutral	Faro	Denmark	off 75' (on Hucles)	23	Christie Welsh	1–0	1–0	Algarve Cup: Final
assist 31	2005-07-10	0	home	Portland	Ukraine	off 64' (on Lloyd)	57	Tiffeny Milbrett	1–1	7–0	Friendly
assist 32	2005-10-23	0	home	Charleston	Mexico	off 46' (on Lloyd)	40	Abby Wambach	3–0	3–0	Friendly
assist 33	2006-01-18	0	neutral	Guangzhou	Norway	off 88' (on Lloyd)	85	Abby Wambach	3–1	3–1	Four Nations Tournament
assist 34	2006-07-23	0	home	San Diego	Ireland	Start	74	Natasha Kai	4–0	5–0	Friendly
assist 35	2006-09-13	0	home	Rochester	Mexico	Start	22	Lindsay Tarpley	1–1	3–0	friendly
assist 36	2006-10-01	0	home	Carson	Chinese Taipei	off 46' (on Lloyd)	27	Lindsay Tarpley	4–0	10–0	friendly
assist 37	2006-10-08	0	home	Richmond	Iceland	off 68' (on Hucles)	34	Abby Wambach	1–0	2–1	friendly
assist 38	2006-11-04	0	away	Seoul	Korea Republic	off 64' (on Hucles)	68	Kristine Lilly	1–0	1–0	Peace Queen Cup: Final
assist 39	2007-05-12	0	home	Frisco	Canada	on 72' (off Chalupny)	73	Heather O'Reilly	5–2	5–2	Friendly
assist 40	2007-10-13	0	home	St. Louis	Mexico	on 33' (off Osborne) off 81' (on Lloyd)	57	Abby Wambach	2–1	5–1	Friendly
assist 41	2008-06-15	0	neutral	Suwon	Australia	off 46' (on Lloyd)	77	Abby Wambach	2–0	2–1	Peace Queen Cup: Group B
assist 42	2008-11-01	0	home	Richmond	Korea Republic	on 46' (off Lloyd)	48	Lindsay Tarpley	3–0	3–1	Friendly
NOTE: N = number of goals scored by Aly Wagner in the match

== Media career ==
Wagner has worked for Fox Sports, CBS Sports, and ESPN as a soccer analyst. She worked as a Fox Sports match analyst during the 2015 FIFA Women's World Cup, and became the first woman to call a FIFA Men's World Cup game on U.S. television by serving as the analyst alongside Derek Rae for Iran's 1–0 win against Morocco on June 15, 2018. She was also part of the Fox Sports broadcast team for the 2022 FIFA World Cup. CBS Sports named Wagner as the host of its 2022 National Women's Soccer League (NWSL) coverage series "Groundwork".

== Sports businesses ==
Wagner was an owner of soccer club Queensboro FC, which had planned to field teams in USL Championship and USL W League starting in 2021. However, the club ultimately folded in 2022 before the men's team played any games and after the women's team played only one season. She is also a founding owner, co-chair, and alternate league board representative for Bay FC, the NWSL expansion club awarded to the San Francisco Bay Area in 2023. Wagner worked together with former USWNT players Brandi Chastain, Leslie Osborne, and Danielle Slaton to lobby the NWSL for a team, and was credited with convincing Sixth Street Partners CEO Alan Waxman to have the fund lead investment in the bid.

== Personal life ==
In December 2006, Wagner married Adam Eyre, a former soccer player at Santa Clara University who played briefly for the New England Revolution of Major League Soccer. Wagner gave birth to triplet boys in August 2013 and a daughter in December 2015.
