= WUSA records and statistics =

The following is a compilation of notable records and statistics for teams and players in and seasons of the Women's United Soccer Association.

== Champions and regular season winners ==
| Season | Playoff final | | | Regular season | | |
| Season | Champions | Score | Runners-up | Shield winners | Points | Runners-up |
|---|---|---|---|---|---|---|
| 2001 | Bay Area CyberRays | 3–3 (4–2 pen); Details | Atlanta Beat | Atlanta Beat | 37–37; Standings | Bay Area CyberRays |
| 2002 | Carolina Courage | 3–2; Details | Washington Freedom | Carolina Courage | 40–39; Standings | Philadelphia Charge |
| 2003 | Washington Freedom | 2–1; Details | Atlanta Beat | Boston Breakers | 37–35 | Atlanta Beat |

== Scoring ==
=== Games ===
Largest Victories
| Winning Margin | Date | Home team | Result | Away team |
|---|---|---|---|---|
| 6 | 03/04/12 | Atlanta Beat | 6–0 | Boston Breakers |
| 5 | 02/04/20 | San Diego Spirit | 6–1 | New York Power |
| 5 | 03/04/05 | Atlanta Beat | 5–0 | New York Power |
| 5 | 03/08/02 | Washington Freedom | 5–0 | San Jose CyberRays |
| 4 | 01/08/06 | Philadelphia Charge | 5–1 | Carolina Courage |
| 4 | 01/08/09 | Atlanta Beat | 4–0 | Bay Area CyberRays |
| 4 | 02/06/14 | Washington Freedom | 4–0 | San Diego Spirit |
| 4 | 03/04/05 | New York Power | 0–4 | Washington Freedom |

Highest Scoring
| Goals Scored | Date | Home team | Result | Away team |
|---|---|---|---|---|
| 9 | 02/07/06 | San Diego Spirit | 5–4 | Boston Breakers |
| 9 | 03/05/03 | Philadelphia Charge | 4–5 | New York Power |
| 7 | 01/05/26 | Carolina Courage | 4–3 | San Diego Spirit |
| 7 | 02/04/20 | San Diego Spirit | 6–1 | New York Power |
| 7 | 02/06/15 | San Jose CyberRays | 4–3 | New York Power |
| 7 | 02/06/22 | Boston Breakers | 5–2 | New York Power |
| 7 | 03/05/17 | Washington Freedom | 2–5 | Carolina Courage |
| 6 | 01/05/15 | Bay Area CyberRays | 2–4 | Boston Breakers |
| 6 | 01/06/07 | Carolina Courage | 2–4 | New York Power |
| 6 | 01/07/26 | New York Power | 4–2 | Boston Breakers |
| 6 | 01/08/06 | Philadelphia Charge | 5–1 | Carolina Courage |
| 6 | 02/05/04 | Philadelphia Charge | 4–2 | Boston Breakers |
| 6 | 02/05/11 | Atlanta Beat | 3–3 | New York Power |
| 6 | 02/08/10 | New York Power | 2–4 | Washington Freedom |
| 6 | 03/04/12 | Atlanta Beat | 6–0 | Boston Breakers |
| 6 | 03/06/21 | San Diego Spirit | 4–2 | New York Power |
| 6 | 03/06/22 | Atlanta Beat | 4–2 | Philadelphia Charge |
| 6 | 03/06/28 | New York Power | 3–3 | Carolina Courage |
| 6 | 03/07/09 | Washington Freedom | 4–2 | Philadelphia Charge |

== All-time successes and records ==
Regular Season
| Rank | Club | 1st | 2nd | 3rd | 4th |
|---|---|---|---|---|---|
| 1 | Atlanta Beat | 1 | 1 | 0 | 1 |
| 2 | Boston Breakers | 1 | 0 | 0 | 0 |
| 3 | Carolina Courage | 1 | 0 | 0 | 0 |
| 4 | Philadelphia Charge | 0 | 1 | 0 | 1 |
| 5 | San Jose CyberRays | 0 | 1 | 0 | 0 |
| 6 | Washington Freedom | 0 | 0 | 1 | 1 |
| 7 | San Diego Spirit | 0 | 0 | 1 | 0 |
| 8 | New York Power | 0 | 0 | 1 | 0 |

Playoffs
| Rank | Club | Champions | Runners-up | Semi |
|---|---|---|---|---|
| 1 | Washington Freedom | 1 | 1 | 0 |
| 2 | Carolina Courage | 1 | 0 | 0 |
| 3 | San Jose CyberRays | 1 | 0 | 0 |
| 4 | Atlanta Beat | 0 | 2 | 1 |
| 5 | Philadelphia Charge | 0 | 0 | 2 |
| 6 | Boston Breakers | 0 | 0 | 1 |
| 7 | San Diego Spirit | 0 | 0 | 1 |
| 8 | New York Power | 0 | 0 | 1 |

Tiebreak for otherwise identical records is most recent success, followed by highest average regular season rank

=== Regular-season records ===
| Pts/PPG Rank | Club | GP | W | L | T | GF | GA | GD | Pts | Pts Per Game | 1st | 2nd | 3rd | 4th |
| Pts/PPG Rank | Club | GP | W | L | T | GF | GA | GD | Pts | Pts Per Game | Finishing Positions | | | |
|---|---|---|---|---|---|---|---|---|---|---|---|---|---|---|
| 1 | Atlanta Beat | 63 | 30 | 17 | 16 | 99 | 69 | +30 | 106 | 1.683 | 1 | 1 | | 1 |
| 2 | San Jose CyberRays | 63 | 26 | 24 | 13 | 84 | 83 | +1 | 91 | 1.444 | | 1 | | |
| 3 | Philadelphia Charge | 63 | 25 | 23 | 15 | 101 | 90 | +11 | 90 | 1.429 | | 1 | | 1 |
| 4 | Washington Freedom | 63 | 26 | 25 | 12 | 106 | 95 | +11 | 90 | 1.429 | | | 1 | 1 |
| 5 | Boston Breakers | 63 | 24 | 22 | 17 | 98 | 99 | –1 | 89 | 1.413 | 1 | | | |
| 6 | Carolina Courage | 63 | 25 | 27 | 11 | 99 | 103 | –4 | 86 | 1.365 | 1 | | | |
| 7 | San Diego Spirit | 63 | 20 | 24 | 19 | 84 | 96 | –12 | 79 | 1.254 | | | 1 | |
| 8 | New York Power | 63 | 19 | 33 | 11 | 94 | 130 | –36 | 68 | 1.079 | | | 1 | |

=== Playoff records ===
| Pts Rank | Club | Appearances vs Seasons | Appearances Percentages | GP | W | L | T^{1} | SOW^{1} | GF | GA | GD | Pts | PPG | PPG Rank |
|---|---|---|---|---|---|---|---|---|---|---|---|---|---|---|
| 1 | Atlanta Beat | 3/3 | 100% | 5 | 2 | 2 | 1 | 0 | 10 | 10 | 0 | 7 | 1.40 | 4 |
| 1 | Washington Freedom | 2/3 | 67% | 4 | 2 | 1 | 1 | 1 | 5 | 4 | +1 | 7 | 1.75 | 3 |
| 3 | Carolina Courage | 1/3 | 33% | 2 | 2 | 0 | 0 | 0 | 5 | 3 | +2 | 6 | 3.00 | 1 |
| 4 | San Jose CyberRays | 1/3 | 33% | 2 | 1 | 0 | 1 | 1 | 6 | 5 | +1 | 4 | 2.00 | 2 |
| 5 | Boston Breakers | 1/3 | 33% | 1 | 0 | 0 | 1 | 0 | 0 | 0 | 0 | 1 | 1.00 | 5 |
| 6 | Philadelphia Charge | 2/3 | 67% | 2 | 0 | 2 | 0 | 0 | 2 | 1 | –2 | 0 | 0.00 | 6 |
| 6 | San Diego Spirit | 1/3 | 33% | 1 | 0 | 1 | 0 | 0 | 1 | 2 | –1 | 0 | 0.00 | 6 |
| 6 | New York Power | 1/3 | 33% | 1 | 0 | 1 | 0 | 0 | 2 | 3 | –1 | 0 | 0.00 | 6 |

^{1}Ties after 90min decided by two 7.5min golden goal overtime periods, followed by shootout if still tied
Sort order is Pts, appearance%, finishing position

== Attendance ==
| Season | Overall | | Highest single | | Lowest single | | Playoff mean |
| Season | Total | Mean | Club | # | Club | # | Playoff mean |
|---|---|---|---|---|---|---|---|
| 2001 | 713,059 | 8,388 | Washington Freedom | 34,148 | New York Power | 2,348 | 13,657 |
| 2002 | 611,826 | 7,032 | Washington Freedom | 24,240 | New York Power | 4,016 | 9,150 |
| 2003 | | | Washington Freedom | 21,892 | New York Power | 3,165 | |

== See also ==
- Women's soccer in the United States
- WPS records and statistics
- NWSL records and statistics
