= 2003 WUSA draft =

The 2003 WUSA college draft took place on February 2, 2003. It was the third and final college draft held by Women's United Soccer Association (WUSA) to assign the rights of college players to the WUSA teams.

== Round 1 ==
Pick	Player	Pos.	WUSA team	Previous team
1	Aly Wagner	MF	San Diego Spirit	Santa Clara
2	Christie Welsh	FW	New York Power	Penn State
3	Dewyn Hawkins	MF	Boston Breakers	Santa Clara
4	Hope Solo	GK	Philadelphia Charge	Washington
5	Callie Withers	MF	Atlanta Beat	Stanford
6	Deliah Arrington	FW	Philadelphia Charge	Clemson
7	Mary McVeigh	MF	Philadelphia Charge	Dartmouth
8	Breanna Boyd	DF	Carolina Courage	Nebraska

== Round 2 ==
Pick	Player	Pos.	WUSA team	Previous team
1	Lauren Orlandos	DF	New York Power	Pilots
2	Leslie Gaston	DF	Atlanta Beat	North Carolina
3	Marcia Wallis	FW	Boston Breakers	Stanford
4	Betsy Barr	MF	San Jose CyberRays	Pilots
5	Abby Crumpton	FW	Atlanta Beat	Michigan
6	Erin Misaki	MF	Philadelphia Charge	Pilots
7	Susan Bush	MF	San Diego Spirit	North Carolina
8	Meghann Burke	GK	Carolina Courage	Saint Louis University

== Round 3 ==
Pick	Player	Pos.	WUSA team	Previous team
1	Jen Branam	GK	San Diego Spirit	North Carolina
2	Missy Gregg	FW	Washington Freedom	Christian Brothers University
3	Kelly Worden	DF	Boston Breakers	Virginia
4	Darci Borski	FW	Washington Freedom	Virginia
5	Katie Antongiovanni	MF	Atlanta Beat	Denver
6	Ruth Montgomery	GK	Washington Freedom	St. Mary's College
7	Ali Fennell	MF	Washington Freedom	USC
8	Heather Ragsdale	MF	Carolina Courage	Texas A&M

== Round 4 ==
Pick	Player	Pos.	WUSA team	Previous team
1	Heather Beem	FW	New York Power	Clemson
2	Susan Palmer	DF	San Diego Spirit	Pepperdine
3	Sarah Popper	MF	Boston Breakers	Connecticut
4	Sarah Peters	GK	San Jose CyberRays	Oregon
5	Sandra Kayulu	MF	Atlanta Beat	Hartford
6	Rachel Kruze	MF	Philadelphia Charge	West Virginia
7	Laura Schott	FW	Washington Freedom	Cal
8	Kate Gordon	FW	Carolina Courage	Marquette

== See also ==
- List of WUSA drafts
