= List of Women's United Soccer Association stadiums =

The following is a list of Women's United Soccer Association stadiums. Included are the stadium names, dates of occupation, occupant, date of opening and location:

Women's United Soccer Association Stadiums
Team	Stadium (former names)	Years Used	Capacity	Opened	City
Atlanta Beat	Bobby Dodd Stadium	2001	41,000	1913	Atlanta, Georgia
Atlanta Beat	Herndon Stadium	2002–2003	15,000	1948	Atlanta, Georgia
Boston Breakers	Nickerson Field	2001-2003	10,412	1915	Boston, Massachusetts
Carolina Courage	Fetzer Field	2001	5,025	1935	Cary, North Carolina
Carolina Courage	SAS Stadium	2002–03	10,000	2002	Cary, North Carolina
New York Power	Mitchel Athletic Complex	2001-03	10,102	1984	Uniondale, New York
Philadelphia Charge	Villanova Stadium	2001-2003	12,500	1927	Philadelphia, Pennsylvania
San Diego Spirit	Torero Stadium	2001-2003	6,000	1961	San Diego, California
San Jose CyberRays	Spartan Stadium	2001-2003	30,456	1933	San Jose, California
Washington Freedom	Robert F. Kennedy Memorial Stadium	2001-2003	56,692	1961	Washington, D.C.
