= 2002 Women's United Soccer Association season =

2002 season of Women's United Soccer Association

Women's United Soccer Association
- Season: 2002
- Champions: Carolina Courage
- Top goalscorer: Kátia (15)

The 2002 Women's United Soccer Association season was the second season for WUSA, the top level professional women's soccer league in the United States. The regular season began on April 13 and ended on August 11. The playoffs began on August 17, with the championship match between played on August 24 between the Carolina Courage and the Washington Freedom.

== Changes from 2001 ==
Prior to the season the Bay Area CyberRays, the champions in the previous season, changed their name to the San Jose CyberRays

== All-Star Game ==
The WUSA All-Star game was played for the first time after the completion of the 2002 season, with the South squad defeating the North 6–1 in front of 14,208 spectators at PGE Park in Portland, Oregon. Rookie Abby Wambach of the Washington Freedom was awarded the game MVP after scoring twice.

== Competition format ==
- The regular season began on April 13 and ended on August 11.
- Each team played a total of 21 games, three against each opponent (either twice at home and once away or vice versa). This caused an uneven schedule with teams hosting either 10 or 11 home games each.
- The four teams with the most points from the regular season qualified for the playoffs. The regular season champions and runners-up hosted the fourth- and third-placed teams, respectively, in the single-game semifinals on August 17. The winners of the semifinals met at Herndon Stadium for the final on August 24.

== Standings ==
Pos	Team	Pld	W	D	L	GF	GA	GD	Pts	Qualification
1	Carolina Courage	21	12	4	5	40	30	+10	40	Regular Season Championship
2	Philadelphia Charge	21	11	6	4	36	22	+14	39	Qualification to play-offs
3	Washington Freedom	21	11	5	5	40	29	+11	38	Qualification to play-offs
4	Atlanta Beat	21	11	1	9	34	29	+5	34	Qualification to play-offs
5	San Jose CyberRays	21	8	5	8	34	30	+4	29	
6	Boston Breakers	21	6	7	8	36	35	+1	25	
7	San Diego Spirit	21	5	5	11	28	42	−14	20	
8	New York Power	21	3	1	17	31	62	−31	10	

Updated to match(es) played on August 2002. Source: statscrew.com and wusa.com

== Playoffs ==
Semi-Finals
2	Philadelphia Charge	0
3	Washington Freedom	1
1	Carolina Courage	2
4	Atlanta Beat	1

Founders Cup
1	Carolina Courage	3
3	Washington Freedom	2

=== Semi-finals ===
August 17, 2002 Semi-Finals	Carolina Courage	2–1 (a.e.t.)	Atlanta Beat	Cary, North Carolina
	Fotopoulos 89' (pen.); Overbeck 92'	Report	Serlenga 28' (pen.)	Stadium: SAS Stadium; Attendance: 5,583; Referee: Misail Tsapos

August 17, 2002 Semi-Finals	Philadelphia Charge	0–1	Washington Freedom	Philadelphia, Pennsylvania
		Report	Gerardo 80'	Stadium: Villanova Stadium; Attendance: 6,547; Referee: Sandra Hunt

=== Founders Cup II ===
August 24, 2002 Founders Cup	Carolina Courage	3–2	Washington Freedom	Atlanta, Georgia
	Riise 20'; Fotopoulos 53'; Prinz 58'	Report	Fotopoulos 31' (o.g.); Hamm 64'	Stadium: Herndon Stadium; Attendance: 15,321; Referee: Ricardo Salazar

== Awards ==
Award	Player	Club
Most Valuable Player	(France) Marinette Pichon	Philadelphia Charge
Offensive Player of the Year	(France) Marinette Pichon	Philadelphia Charge
Defensive Player of the Year	(United States) Danielle Slaton	Carolina Courage
Goalkeeper of the Year	(United States) Kristin Luckenbill	Carolina Courage
Rookie of the Year	(United States) Abby Wambach	Washington Freedom
Coach of the Year	(United States) Mark Krikorian	Philadelphia Charge
Humanitarian Award	(Brazil) Sissi	San Jose CyberRays
Team Community Service Award		Boston Breakers
Team Fair Play Award		Boston Breakers
Referee of the Year	(United States) Kari Seitz	

== Statistical leaders ==
=== Top scorers ===
Rank	Player	Nation	Club	Goals
1	Kátia	BRA	San Jose CyberRays	15
2	Marinette Pichon	FRA	Philadelphia Charge	14
3	Birgit Prinz	GER	Carolina Courage	12
4	Danielle Fotopoulos	USA	Carolina Courage	11
4	Charmaine Hooper	CAN	Atlanta Beat	11
4	Dagny Mellgren	NOR	Boston Breakers	11
7	Tiffeny Milbrett	USA	New York Power	10
7	Abby Wambach	USA	Washington Freedom	10
9	Mia Hamm	USA	Washington Freedom	8
9	Emily Janss	USA	New York Power	8
9	Kristine Lilly	USA	Boston Breakers	8

=== Top assists ===
Rank	Player	Nation	Club	Assists
1	Maren Meinert	GER	Boston Breakers	15
2	Kristine Lilly	USA	Boston Breakers	13
2	Hege Riise	NOR	Carolina Courage	13
4	Danielle Fotopoulos	USA	Carolina Courage	10
5	Sissi	BRA	San Jose CyberRays	9
5	Abby Wambach	USA	Washington Freedom	9
5	Bettina Wiegmann	GER	Boston Breakers	9
8	Zhao Lihong	CHN	Philadelphia Charge	8
8	Shannon MacMillan	USA	San Diego Spirit	8
8	Tiffeny Milbrett	USA	New York Power	8
8	Birgit Prinz	GER	Carolina Courage	8
8	Pu Wei	CHN	Washington Freedom	8

== See also ==
- List of WUSA drafts
