= 2003 Women's United Soccer Association season =

2003 season of Women's United Soccer Association

Women's United Soccer Association
- Season: 2003
- Champions: Washington Freedom

The 2003 Women's United Soccer Association season was the third and final season for WUSA, the first top level professional women's soccer league in the United States. The regular season began on April 5 and ended on August 10. The playoffs began on August 16, with the championship match between played on August 24 between the Washington Freedom and the Atlanta Beat.

== Competition format ==
- The regular season began on April 5 and ended on August 10.
- Each team played a total of 21 games, three against each opponent (either twice at home and once away or vice versa). This caused an uneven schedule with teams hosting either 10 or 11 home games each.
- The four teams with the most points from the regular season qualified for the playoffs. The regular season champions and runners-up hosted the fourth- and third-placed teams, respectively, in the single-game semifinals on August 17. The winners of the semifinals met at Torero Stadium in San Diego, California for the final on August 24.

== Standings ==
Pos	Team	Pld	W	D	L	GF	GA	GD	Pts	Qualification
1	Boston Breakers	21	10	7	4	33	29	+4	37	Regular season winners
2	Atlanta Beat	21	9	8	4	34	19	+15	35	Qualification to playoffs
3	San Diego Spirit	21	8	7	6	27	26	+1	31	Qualification to playoffs
4	Washington Freedom (C)	21	9	4	8	40	31	+9	31	Qualification to playoffs
5	New York Power	21	7	5	9	33	43	−10	26	
6	San Jose CyberRays	21	7	4	10	23	30	−7	25	
7	Carolina Courage	21	7	4	10	31	33	−2	25	
8	Philadelphia Charge	21	5	5	11	30	40	−10	20	

Source: WUSA
(C) Champions

== Playoffs ==
Semi-Finals
1	Boston Breakers	0 (1)
4	Washington Freedom	0 (3)
2	Atlanta Beat	2
3	San Diego Spirit	1

Founders Cup
4	Washington Freedom	2
2	Atlanta Beat	1

=== Semi-finals ===
August 16, 2003 Semi-Finals	Boston Breakers	0–0 (a.e.t.) (1–3 p)	Washington Freedom	Boston, Massachusetts
		Report		Stadium: Nickerson Field; Attendance: 9,070; Referee: Misail Tsapos
	Penalties
	Meinert (penalty missed); Lilly (penalty missed); Mellgren (penalty scored); Aldama (penalty missed)		(penalty scored) Meier; (penalty scored) Little; (penalty scored) Hamm

August 17, 2003 Semi-Finals	Atlanta Beat	2–1 (a.e.t.)	San Diego Spirit	Atlanta, Georgia
	Pohlers 90+2'; Hooper 94'	Report	Wagner 38'	Stadium: Herndon Stadium; Attendance: 8,123; Referee: Erich Simmons

=== Founders Cup III ===
August 24, 2003 Founders Cup	Washington Freedom	2–1 (a.e.t.)	Atlanta Beat	San Diego, California
	Wambach 7', 96'	Report	Hooper 46' (pen.)	Stadium: Torero Stadium; Attendance: 7,106; Referee: Terry Vaughn

== Awards ==
Award	Player	Club
Most Valuable Player	(Germany) Maren Meinert	Boston Breakers
Defensive Player of the Year	(United States) Joy Fawcett	San Diego Spirit
Goalkeeper of the Year	(United States) Briana Scurry	Washington Freedom
Rookie of the Year	(Canada) Christine Latham	San Diego Spirit
Coach of the Year	(Sweden) Pia Sundhage	Boston Breakers
Humanitarian Award	(United States) Jenny Benson	Philadelphia Charge
Team Community Service Award		San Jose CyberRays
Team Fair Play Award		Philadelphia Charge
Referee of the Year	(United States) Terry Vaughn	
Executive of the Year	(United States) Joe Cummings	Boston Breakers
Goal of the Year	(United States) Abby Wambach	Washington Freedom

== See also ==
- List of WUSA drafts
