= Rebekah Splaine =

American soccer player (born 1978)

Personal information
- Date of birth: October 4, 1978 (age 48)
- Place of birth: Cambridge, Massachusetts
- Height: 1.63 m (5 ft 4 in)
- Positions: Forward; midfielder

College career
Years	Team	Apps	(Gls)
1998–2000	Brown Bears		(11)

Senior career*
Years	Team	Apps	(Gls)
2003	Boston Breakers	1	(0)
- * Club domestic league appearances and goals

Rebekah Splaine Salwasser (born October 4, 1978 in Cambridge, Massachusetts) is a retired American soccer player who played for the Boston Breakers. Since retiring from professional soccer, she has worked for various charitable organizations, including the Boston Red Sox's Red Sox Foundation.

== Early life and education ==
Rebekhah Splaine was born in Cambridge, Massachusetts on October 4, 1978 to John and Esther Splaine, and was the second youngest of her five siblings. She began playing soccer when she was four years old. She attended Buckingham Browne & Nichols School, where she played varsity-level basketball, soccer, and lacrosse. She earned the distinction of being named All-New England twice in basketball; her junior year, she achieved All-American recognition in both soccer and lacrosse. Due to an anterior cruciate ligament injury, she did not play her senior year.

Salwasser graduated from Brown University.

== Career ==
While attending Brown University, Salwasser played for the school's soccer team. In 1998, she was named the Ivy League Rookie of the Year. Throughout her tenure at Brown, she received All-Ivy honors three times and All-Region honors twice.

In 2000, Salwasser joined the semi-professional USL W-League, where she played for and captained the Boston Renegades. During her tenure, the team won two league championships. In 2003, she was selected to play for the Boston Breakers in the professional Women's United Soccer Association (WUSA). WUSA folded the following year.

Following her athletic career, Salwasser took on executive roles with various charitable organizations, including the Charlestown Lacrosse & Learning Center, Boston Celtics Shamrock Foundation, and Boston Scholar Athletes Program.

In 2018, Salwasser became the executive director for the Red Sox Foundation. Two years later, she took on the role of the Chair to the Boston Red Sox's Social Justice, Equity & Inclusion Advisory Committee.

Although Salwasser transitioned to a more corporate career, she continued to play for the Boston Aztec, an amateur soccer team.

== Honors ==
Salwasser has received various honors for her charitable work. In 2013, the Massachusetts Business Alliance for Education and Greater Boston Chamber of Commerce named her one of the city's emerging leaders. In 2018, Boston Business Journal included Salwasser on their "40 Under 40" list, and Boston Magazine named her and her husband one of the city's top five "power couples." In 2020, WISE Boston called her a "Woman of Inspiration."

== Personal life ==
Salwasse lives in Dorchester, Boston with her husband and children.
