= Boston Breakers (disambiguation) =

The Boston Breakers (2009–2017) is a defunct soccer team.

Boston Breakers may also refer to:

- Boston Breakers (WUSA) (2001–2003), a soccer team
- Boston Breakers (USFL) or Portland Breakers (1983–1985), an American football team
