= Angela Hucles =

American soccer player and sports executive (born 1978)

Angela Hucles Mangano
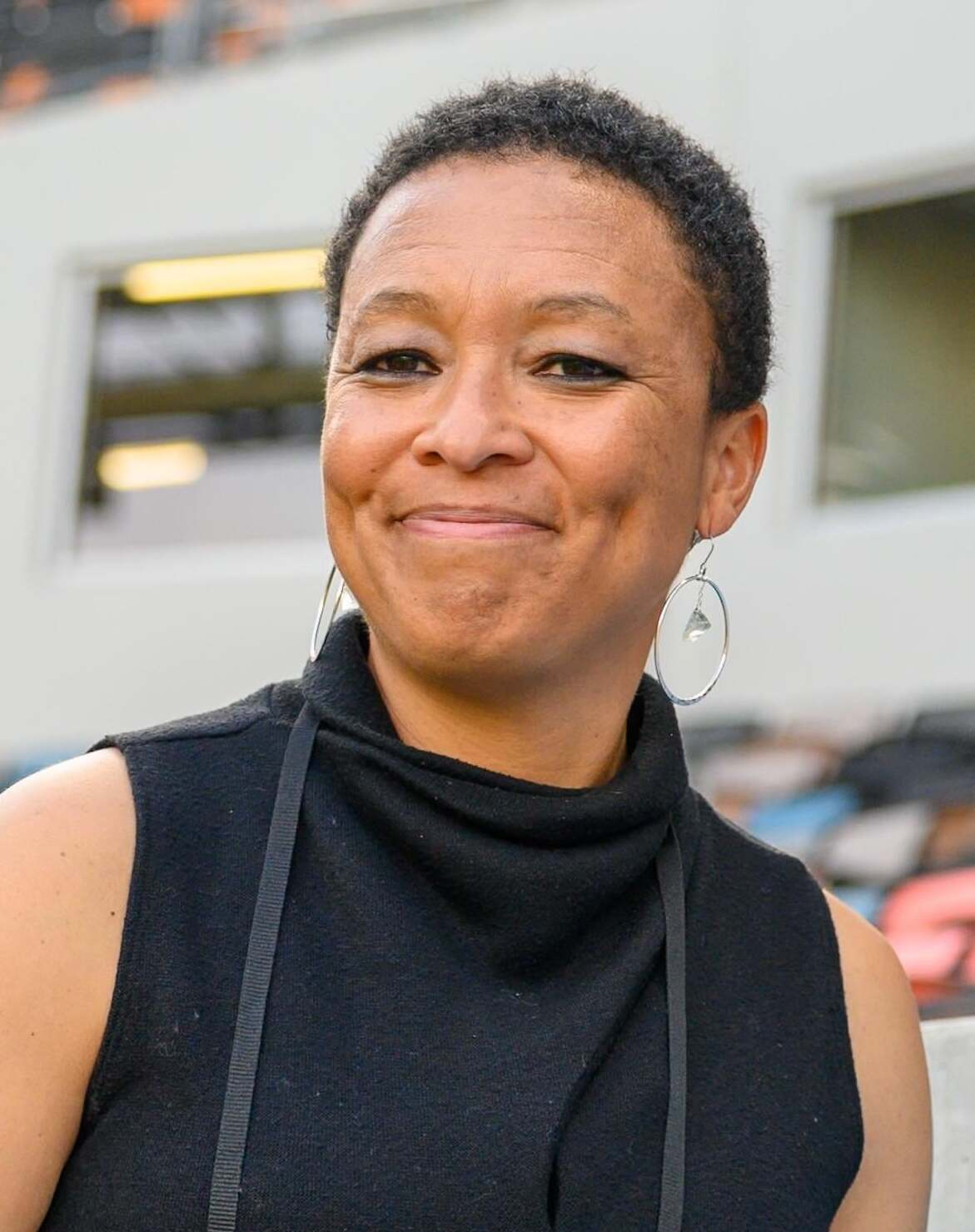
- Hucles Mangano in 2025

Personal information
- Full name: Angela Khalia Hucles Mangano
- Birth name: Angela Khalia Hucles
- Date of birth: July 5, 1978 (age 48)
- Place of birth: Virginia Beach, Virginia, U.S.
- Height: 5 ft 7 in (1.70 m)
- Position: Midfielder

College career
Years	Team	Apps	(Gls)
1996–1999	Virginia Cavaliers		

Senior career*
Years	Team	Apps	(Gls)
2000	Hampton Roads Piranhas	14	(6)
2001–2003	Boston Breakers	57	(6)
2005–2006	Boston Renegades	16	(13)
2009	Boston Breakers	19	(2)
Total		106	(27)

International career
1997–1999	United States U-20		
2002–2009	United States	109	(13)
Medal record
Women's football (soccer)
Representing the United States
Olympic Games
Gold medal – first place	2004 Athens	Team competition
Gold medal – first place	2008 Beijing	Team competition
FIFA Women's World Cup
Bronze medal – third place	2003 USA	Team competition
Bronze medal – third place	2007 China	Team competition
- * Club domestic league appearances and goals

Angela Khalia Hucles Mangano (née Hucles; born July 5, 1978) is an American sports executive and former professional soccer player who is currently the president of women's soccer for the Houston Dash of the National Women's Soccer League (NWSL). She was previously the vice president of player development and operations for Angel City FC, of which she is also a minority owner. As a player, Hucles Mangano played as a midfielder and was a member of the United States national team.

== Early life ==
Hucles' parents are academics Janis Sanchez-Hucles and Michael Hucles. Angela graduated from Norfolk Academy where she was a Parade and NSCAA All-American selection in 1995. She was twice named an All-State and All-Region selection in 1994 and 1995. She graduated in 1996 as Norfolk Academy's all-time leading scorer with 204 goals and 106 assists.

=== University of Virginia ===
Hucles played college soccer at the University of Virginia, where she was a four-year all-ACC player and tallied 59 goals, including a record 19 game-winners. She is still Virginia's career women's leader in goals, game-winning goals, and total points.

== Club career ==
After graduating from Virginia in 2000, Hucles played for Hampton Roads Piranhas of the W-League. She led the league in assists with seven, playing in 14 games and scoring six goals.

Hucles was then drafted in the 2001 WUSA Inaugural Draft in the 12th round (93rd overall) by the Boston Breakers of the newly formed Women's United Soccer Association. She went on to make 57 total appearances for the club, scoring six goals. She scored the first goal in the history of the organization on March 6, 2001, in a preseason exhibition against the Duke Blue Devils. In her first season, Hucles appeared in 21 games, starting 19 of them, and finished with two goals and no assists. In 2002, Hucles appeared in 19 games, starting 17, and finished with three goals and four assists. In 2003, Hucles appeared in 17 games, all starts, and scored one goal and assisted on four more. After the 2003 season, the WUSA ceased operations.

Hucles returned to a club in 2005 when she turned out for the Boston Renegades. She only appeared in five games in 2005 but notched three goals and an assist. In 2006, Hucles had a much more productive season, appearing in 11 games and tallying 10 goals and two assists.

In 2008, Women's Professional Soccer was established. Hucles, along with US National Team players Kristine Lilly and Heather Mitts, were allocated to the new Boston Breakers on September 16, 2006. The league kicked off in 2009, which saw Hucles appear in 19 games, all starts, and score two goals and an assist. Following the conclusion of the season, on October 16, 2009, Hucles abruptly announced her retirement from both club and international soccer.

== International career ==
With the United States Women's National Team, Hucles won two Olympic gold medals and finished third in two World Cups. She made her first appearance for the United States on April 27, 2002, against Finland. She went on to appear in 109 total matches for the United States, with her last appearance on July 22, 2009, against Canada.

Hucles was a member of the U.S. squad at the 2003 FIFA Women's World Cup but did not play in the tournament due to a shin injury. She was a member of the gold medal-winning United States team for the 2004 Summer Olympics, appearing in two games in Athens. At the 2007 FIFA Women's World Cup, she was a member of the USA squad but did not get any playing time. However, her biggest role with the United States came in the 2008 Summer Olympics in Beijing. Hucles was expected to play a backup role with the squad, but an injury to Abby Wambach forced Hucles into a starting position. She responded by scoring four goals, including two against Japan in the semi-finals. Her efforts helped the United States to the gold medal, and she finished second only to Cristiane in goals scored.

On October 16, 2009, Hucles announced her retirement from both club and international soccer.

== Sports and diplomacy ==
In April 2014, Hucles traveled to Morocco as a SportsUnited Sports Envoy for the U.S. Department of State. In this function, she worked with Lesle Gallimore and Marian Dalmy to conduct soccer clinics and events for 104 youth from under-served areas. In so doing, Hucles helped contribute to SportsUnited's mission to promote greater international understanding and inclusion through sport.

Hucles served as the Women's Sports Foundation President, effective January 1, 2015 to January 2017. She has become a regular speaker on topics of sports leadership, equality, inclusion and safe spaces, anti-bullying, and the power of sport and its impact on personal growth and development. She is a member of the advisory board for You Can Play, a campaign dedicated to fighting homophobia in sports.

=== Club management ===
On June 16, 2021, National Women's Soccer League (NWSL) expansion club Angel City FC hired Hucles as the team's vice president of player development. In August 2022, Angel City promoted her to general manager, replacing Eniola Aluko.

During her tenure as general manager, Hucles was responsible for the hiring of head coach Becki Tweed, the signings of Alyssa Thompson and Katie Zelem, and the start of construction on Angel City's training facilities.

In October 2024, the NWSL suspended Hucles from player transaction-related duties for the remainder of the calendar year after the league determined that the club had improperly made undisclosed side-letter agreements with players and exceeded the league's salary cap. The club was also fined $200,000 and docked three points, and club president Julie Uhrman was also suspended.

On December 5, 2024, Angel City announced Hucles's exit from the club. Four days later on December 9, NWSL club Houston Dash announced their hiring of Hucles to the new role of president of women's soccer. The role's duties included those of the general manager and chief of soccer operations.

== Personal life ==
Hucles ran a successful real estate group with her wife Meg Mangano prior to joining Angel City FC as general manager. They have two children.

== Career statistics ==
=== International goals ===
No.	Date	Venue	Opponent	Score	Result	Competition
1.	November 6, 2002	Seattle, United States	Costa Rica	4–0	7–0	2002 CONCACAF Women's Gold Cup
2.	March 14, 2004	Ferreiras, Portugal	France	3–0	5–1	2004 Algarve Cup
3.	March 14, 2004	Ferreiras, Portugal	France	4–0	5–1	2004 Algarve Cup
4.	March 16, 2004	Quarteira, Portugal	Denmark	1–0	1–0	2004 Algarve Cup
5.	October 16, 2004	Kansas City, United States	Mexico	1–0	1–0	Friendly
6.	May 3, 2008	Birmingham, United States	Australia	5–4	5–4	Friendly
7.	June 21, 2008	Suwon, South Korea	Canada	1–0	1–0	2008 Peace Queen Cup
8.	July 2, 2007	Fredrikstad, Norway	Norway	3–0	4–0	Friendly
9.	August 12, 2008	Shenyang, China	New Zealand	4–0	4–0	2008 Summer Olympics
10.	August 15, 2008	Shanghai, China	Canada	1–0	2–1 (a.e.t.)	2008 Summer Olympics
11.	August 18, 2008	Beijing, China	Japan	1–1	4–1	2008 Summer Olympics
12.	August 18, 2008	Beijing, China	Japan	4–1	4–1	2008 Summer Olympics
13.	November 1, 2008	Richmond, United States	South Korea	1–0	3–1	Friendly

== See also ==
- List of footballers with 100 or more caps
- List of Olympic medalists in football
- List of multiple Olympic gold medalists in one event
- List of multiple Olympic gold medalists
- List of 2004 Summer Olympics medal winners
- List of 2008 Summer Olympics medal winners
