= Kate Gordon (soccer) =

American soccer player

Personal information
- Date of birth: c. 1981 (age 44–45)
- Position: Forward

College career
Years	Team	Apps	(Gls)
1999–2002	Marquette Golden Eagles	94	(48)

Senior career*
Years	Team	Apps	(Gls)
2003	Carolina Courage		
- * Club domestic league appearances and goals

Kate Gordon is a retired American soccer player who played in the Women's United Soccer Association (WUSA).

== Early life and education ==
Gordon graduated from Marquette University in 2003.

== Career ==
While studying at Marquette University, Gordon played for the school's soccer team, becoming a three-time All-American. Upon graduating, she was ranked second for overall points scored at the university. In 2004, she was awarded the university's McCahill Award, which honors "achievement in athletics, scholarship and service to the university". She was also named the Conference USA Co-Player of the Decade.

She is also "a four-time All-Conference USA team member".

In WUSA's 2003 draft held in February, Gordon was selected in the fourth round to play for the Carolina Courage, though she was placed on the reserve roster the following month. WUSA folded later that year.
