= Kim Pickup =

American soccer player (born 1978)

Personal information
- Full name: Kimberly Dawn Pickup
- Date of birth: October 4, 1978 (age 48)
- Place of birth: Van Nuys, California, United States
- Height: 1.75 m (5 ft 9 in)
- Position: Defender

College career
Years	Team	Apps	(Gls)
1996–1999	Santa Clara Broncos		

Senior career*
Years	Team	Apps	(Gls)
2000	Boston Renegades	7	(0)
2001–2003	San Diego Spirit	52	(0)
- * Club domestic league appearances and goals

Kimberly Dawn Pickup (born October 4, 1978) is an American retired soccer player who played for the San Diego Spirit. She was a noted exponent of the flip throw in.

== Career ==
Kimberley Pickup started playing volleyball before she tried playing soccer in high school. Pickup attended the Santa Clara University and played for the university team. Pickup's success in college soccer led her to be spotted by professional soccer teams in the Women's United Soccer Association.

In 2000 she played for Boston Renegades of the USL W-League, making seven appearances. Pickup was then a 4th round pick in the 2000 WUSA Draft by San Diego Spirit.
