= Amy Sauer =

Retired American soccer player

Personal information
- Date of birth: March 21, 1980 (age 46)
- Place of birth: Spring, Texas
- Height: 5 ft 5 in (1.65 m)
- Position: Defender

College career
Years	Team	Apps	(Gls)
1998–2001	Stanford Cardinal	83	(1)

Senior career*
Years	Team	Apps	(Gls)
2002	San Diego Spirit	20	(0)
- * Club domestic league appearances and goals

Amy Sauer is a retired American soccer player who played for the San Diego Spirit.

== Early life and education ==
Sauer grew up in Spring, Texas, the daughter of Donald and Mary Ellen Sauer and the younger sister of A. J. Sauer, who played for Stanford's men's soccer team from 1995 to 1999. She attended from Klein Oak High School, then Stanford University, graduating in 2001.

== Career ==
Considered one of the top 15 recruits in the country, Sauer played for Stamford, Texas soccer team from 1998 to 2001, playing in every game and starting in most.

In 2002, she made her professional debut with the Women's United Soccer Association (WUSA), where she was selected to play for the San Diego Spirit in the second round of the draft. She was released from the team in 2003.
