= Sarah Popper =

American soccer player

Personal information
- Date of birth: October 20, 1981 (age 45)
- Place of birth: Greenwich, Connecticut, United States
- Height: 1.62 m (5 ft 4 in)
- Position: Defender

College career
Years	Team	Apps	(Gls)
1999–2002	UConn Huskies	97	

Senior career*
Years	Team	Apps	(Gls)
2003	Boston Breakers	14	(0)
- * Club domestic league appearances and goals

Sarah Michner (née Popper) is a retired American soccer player who played for the Boston Breakers.

== Career ==
Popper attended the University of Connecticut and played for the university team whilst earning was an NSCAA First Team All-American and winning the Big East with the UConn Huskies. Popper's success in college soccer lead her to be spotted by professional soccer teams in the Women's United Soccer Association.

Popper was a 4th-round pick in the 2003 WUSA Draft by the Boston Breakers. After retiring from professional soccer, Popper become a soccer coach for the University of Louisville program.
