= Heather Aldama =

American soccer player (born 1978)

Personal information
- Full name: Heather Marie Aldama
- Date of birth: December 1, 1978 (age 47)
- Place of birth: Redlands, California, United States
- Height: 5 ft 2 in (1.57 m)
- Position: Midfielder

College career
Years	Team	Apps	(Gls)
1997–2000	Santa Clara Broncos		

Senior career*
Years	Team	Apps	(Gls)
2001–2003	Boston Breakers	54	(1)

International career
1998–2000	United States	5	(0)
- * Club domestic league appearances and goals

Heather Marie Aldama (born December 1, 1978) is a retired American soccer midfielder who was a member of the United States women's national soccer team.

== Club career ==
She played for the Boston Breakers in the Women's United Soccer Association from 2001 to 2003.

== Career statistics ==
=== Club ===
Appearances and goals by club, season and competition
Club	Season	League			Playoffs (Note: Includes WUSA Playoffs)		Total	
Club	Season	Division	Apps	Goals	Apps	Goals	Apps	Goals
Boston Breakers	2001	WUSA	18	0	—		18	0
Boston Breakers	2002	WUSA	17	0	—		17	0
Boston Breakers	2003	WUSA	19	1	1	0	20	1
Career total			54	1	1	0	55	1

=== International ===
Appearances and goals by national team and year
National team	Year	Apps	Goals
United States	1998	1	0
United States	1999	1	0
United States	2000	3	0
Total		5	0
