= Chrisy McCann =

American soccer player (born 1977)

Personal information
- Date of birth: May 26, 1977 (age 49)
- Place of birth: Providence, Rhode Island, United States
- Height: 5 ft 9 in (1.75 m)
- Position: Defender

College career
Years	Team	Apps	(Gls)
1995–1998	UConn Huskies	100	(22)

Senior career*
Years	Team	Apps	(Gls)
2001–2003	Boston Breakers	51	(0)
- * Club domestic league appearances and goals

Christine Rich (née McCann, born May 26, 1977 in Providence, Rhode Island) is a retired American soccer player who played for the Boston Breakers.

== Early life and education ==
McCann was born in Providence, Rhode Island and raised in Barrington, Rhode Island. She attended the University of Connecticut.

== Career ==
While attending the University of Connecticut, McCann played for the university's soccer team, where she held the role of team captain. In 1997, her team played in the National Collegiate Athletic Association (NCAA) finals.

Although McCann was initially denied a position on the Boston Breakers team in 2001, she was later "added to the reserve squad on a per diem basis" and ultimately started in every game her first season on the team. She remained on the team until the Women's United Soccer Association folded in 2003.
