= 2003 Four Nations Tournament (women's football) =

Tournament details
- Host country: China
- Dates: 23–29 January 2003
- Teams: 4 (from 3 confederations)
- Venue(s): (in Yiwu, Wuhan, Shanghai host cities)

Tournament statistics
- Matches played: 6
- Goals scored: 13 (2.17 per match)
- Top scorer(s): (Norway) Dagny Mellgren (2 goals)

The 2003 Four Nations Tournament was the third edition of this invitational women's football tournament held in China with four national teams participating in a round robin format. It was held from January 23 to 29, 2003, in the cities of Yiwu, Wuhan and Shanghai.

== Final standings ==
Team	Pld	W	D	L	GF	GA	GD	Pts
United States	3	2	0	1	4	3	+1	6
China	3	1	2	0	3	1	+2	5
Germany	3	0	2	1	2	3	−1	2
Norway	3	0	2	1	4	6	−2	2

== Match results ==
23 January 2003

China	0–0	Germany

Yiwu
23 January 2003

Norway	1–3	United States
Dagny Mellgren 42'		Thori Bryan 24'; Tiffeny Milbrett 64'; Heather O'Reilly 87'

Meihu Sports Centre, Yiwu
Attendance: 27,000
Referee: Zhang Dongqing (China)

26 January 2003

Germany	2–2	Norway
Martina Müller 36'; Linda Bresonik 87' (pen.)		Dagny Mellgren 28'; Anita Rapp 73'

Wuhan
26 January 2003

China	2–0	United States
Fan Yunjie 19'; Sun Wen 36'

Wuhan Sports Center Stadium, Wuhan
Attendance: 40,000
Referee: Rebekka Kirchner (Germany)

29 January 2003

United States	1–0	Germany
Devvyn Hawkins 16'

Hongkou Stadium, Shanghai
Attendance: 5,000
Referee: Bente Skogvang (Norway)
29 January 2003

China	1–1	Norway
Teng Wei 26'		Unni Lehn 47'

Shanghai

== Goalscorers ==
There were 13 goals scored in 6 matches, for an average of 2.17 goals per match.

2 goals

- (Norway) Dagny Mellgren

1 goal

- (China) Fan Yunjie
- (China) Sun Wen
- (China) Teng Wei
- (Germany) Linda Bresonik
- (Germany) Martina Müller
- (Norway) Anita Rapp
- (Norway) Unni Lehn
- (United States) Devvyn Hawkins
- (United States) Heather O'Reilly
- (United States) Thori Bryan
- (United States) Tiffeny Milbrett
