= Jena Kluegel =

American soccer player (born 1979)

Personal information
- Full name: Jena Louise Cogswell
- Birth name: Jena Louise Kluegel
- Date of birth: November 2, 1979 (age 46)
- Place of birth: Saint Paul, Minnesota, U.S.
- Height: 5 ft 3 in (1.60 m)
- Position: Midfielder

Youth career
- Saint Paul Blackhawks SC
- –1998: Mahtomedi Zephyrs

College career
Years	Team	Apps	(Gls)
1998–2001	North Carolina Tar Heels	98	(25)

Senior career*
Years	Team	Apps	(Gls)
2002–2003	Boston Breakers	39	(0)

International career
- United States U18
- United States U21
2000–2003	United States	24	(1)
Medal record
Women's football
Representing United States
Pan American Games
Gold medal – first place	1999 Winnipeg	Team
- * Club domestic league appearances and goals

Jena Louise Cogswell (née Kluegel; born November 2, 1979) is an American former soccer player who played as a midfielder, making 24 appearances for the United States women's national team.

== Career ==
Kluegel played for the Mahtomedi Zephyrs in high school, where she was Parade Co-Player of the Year in 1998 and an All-American in 1996, 1997, and 1998 after the team won the state championship in 1997. She was also an All-State cross country and track runner, winning the Minnesota state championship in 800 metres in 1994. She also played for the youth club Saint Paul Blackhawks SC. In college, she played for the North Carolina Tar Heels, winning the NCAA championship in 1999 and 2000. She was Soccer America First-Team All-American in 2001, and an NSCAA Third-Team All-American in 2000 and 2001. She was a letter-winner at the school and was included in the NCAA All-Tournament Team in 1999, 2000, and 2001. In total, she scored 25 goals and recorded 45 assists in 98 appearances for the Tar Heels.

Kluegel began with the U.S. under-18 national team at the 1999 Pan American Games in Winnipeg, Canada, where the team won the gold medal against senior national teams. She later played for the under-21 national team, winning the Nordic Cup in 2001. She made her international debut for the United States senior team on February 9, 2000 in a friendly match against Norway. In total, she made 24 appearances for the U.S. and scored 1 goal, earning her final cap on February 16, 2003 in a friendly match against Iceland.

In club soccer, Kluegel played for the Boston Breakers of the Women's United Soccer Association from 2002 to 2003, where she made 39 appearances and recorded 6 assists.

In 2013, she was inducted into the Mahtomedi High School Athletic Hall of Fame.

== Personal life ==
Kluegel was born in Saint Paul, Minnesota, though Mahtomedi is her hometown.

== Career statistics ==
=== International ===
United States
Year	Apps	Goals
2000	3	0
2001	10	0
2002	7	1
2003	4	0
Total	24	1

=== International goals ===
No.	Date	Location	Opponent	Score	Result	Competition
1	April 27, 2002	San Jose, California, United States	Finland	3–0	3–0	Friendly
