= Tracy Ducar =

American soccer goalkeeper (born 1973)

Tracy Noonan
Personal information
- Full name: Tracy Jean Noonan (nee Ducar)
- Birth name: Tracy Jean Noonan
- Date of birth: June 18, 1973 (age 53)
- Place of birth: Lawrence, Massachusetts, U.S.
- Height: 5 ft 7 in (1.70 m)
- Position: Goalkeeper

College career
Years	Team	Apps	(Gls)
1992–1995	North Carolina Tar Heels		

Senior career*
Years	Team	Apps	(Gls)
1998–1999	Raleigh Wings		
2001–2003	Boston Breakers		

International career
1996–1999	United States	24	(0)

Managerial career
- 1998–1999: UNC Greensboro Spartans (goalkeeping)
- 2004–2005: Greensboro Pride
- * Club domestic league appearances and goals

Tracy Jean Noonan (née Ducar; born June 18, 1973) is an American soccer goalkeeper who was a member of the 1999 FIFA Women's World Cup-winning United States women's national team. She also played for the Boston Breakers in the Women's United Soccer Association.

== Early life ==
Ducar was born in Lawrence, Massachusetts and began her athletic career at North Andover High School. She played both basketball and soccer, however, her second year she injured her back and needed surgery for two vertebrae to be fused together. Ducar was not able to play her junior year of soccer, and her soccer coach thought she was never going to be able to play again. However, Ducar proved her coach wrong, and led North Andover's women's soccer team to a Cape Ann League Title.

=== University of North Carolina ===
Ducar attended and played goalkeeper for the University of North Carolina. She graduated in 1995 with a degree in biology and a minor in chemistry. She was also inducted into Phi Beta Kappa. In the 1994 NCSS Tournament, Ducar played every minute in every game, and University of North Carolina won the National Championship. Ducar had complete shutouts both in the semi-final and final games.

Ducar was nominated for the 1995 Missouri Athletic Club Player of the Year. She was named All-American and Most Valuable Player at UNC; as captain, she led them to a record of 23–0–0 in 1995.

== Playing career ==
=== Club ===
In 2000, Ducar became one of the twenty founding players of the Women's United Soccer Association, (WUSA), the first official professional women's soccer league in the United States. From 2000 to 2001, Ducar played for the Boston Breakers. In 2001, Ducar was awarded the Boston Breaker's Shield Award.

Previously, during the summer of 1998, Ducar played for the Raleigh Wings. In 1999, Ducar played again for the Wings and led the team to a win in the W-League Championship.

=== International ===
Ducar's first appearance on the United States women's national soccer team was on January 16, 1996 vs. Brazil in Campinas, Brazil. Ducar picked up two more caps, (games played against international competition), in Melbourne on February 28, 1996 and in Bathurst on March 3, 1996. Ducar managed her first shutout on January 28, 1996 vs. Ukraine. Then in 1997, during the Nike Victory Tournament, Ducar split time in every game with Briana Scurry, (the starting goal keeper for the U.S. National Team), and also in the Women's World Cup in 1997.

One of Ducar's most shining moments was during the U.S. vs. Salzgitter, Germany. A substitution was made by the U.S., replacing Scurry with Ducar. Ducar had made four big saves to keep the shut out. In 1997, Ducar had made twelve overall appearances for the national team, while starting in three of them. In 1998, Ducar played in six matches for the national team and while starting in each one, had four shutouts, and allowed only two goals. That same year, the team won the Goodwill Games. During the 1999 FIFA Women's World Cup, Ducar represented the U.S. as one of the two back-up goalkeepers.

== Coaching career ==
From 1999 to 2000, Ducar was goalkeeper coach and recruiting coordinator at the University of North Carolina at Greensboro.

In 2004, Ducar was named the women's head soccer coach at Greensboro College. Ducar and her husband, Chris Ducar, (the women's goalkeeper coach at the University of North Carolina), live together in Durham, North Carolina and run soccer camps, clinics, and private teaching sessions together.

== See also ==
- United States women's national soccer team
- Boston Breakers (WUSA)
