= Devvyn Hawkins =

American soccer player (born 1980)

Personal information
- Full name: Devvyn Kyle MacBeth
- Birth name: Devvyn Kyle Hawkins
- Date of birth: November 29, 1980 (age 45)
- Place of birth: Sitka, Alaska, U.S.
- Height: 5 ft 8 in (1.73 m)
- Position: Midfielder

Youth career
- Capital Cougars

College career
Years	Team	Apps	(Gls)
1999–2002	Santa Clara Broncos	93	(21)

Senior career*
Years	Team	Apps	(Gls)
2001	Seattle Sounders Select		
2003	Boston Breakers	15	(1)
2005	PSV Union Football Club		

International career
- United States U21
2001–2003	United States	9	(1)

Managerial career
- Cabrillo Seahawks (assistant)
- Santa Cruz Breakers Academy
- Aptos Mariners
- Santa Clara Sporting
- 2007: Santa Clara Broncos (assistant)
- * Club domestic league appearances and goals

Devvyn Kyle MacBeth (née Hawkins; born November 29, 1980) is an American former soccer player who played as a midfielder, making nine appearances for the United States women's national team.

== Career ==
Hawkins played for the Capital Cougars in high school. In college, she played for the Santa Clara Broncos, helping the team to win the 2001 NCAA Division I Women's Soccer Tournament. She was included in the NCAA All-Tournament Team in 2002, and the same year received Second-Team Athletic All-American Honors. She was also included in the All-West Region third team in 2001 and second team in 2002. Hawkins was included in the All-WCC first team in 1999 and 2002, second team in 2001, and an honorable mention in 2000. She was chosen as the team's Rookie of the Year in 1999, as well as the Player of the Year and Most Inspirational Player in 2002. In total, she scored 21 goals and recorded 20 assists in 93 appearances for the Broncos.

Hawkins was a member of the U.S. under-21 national team. She made her international debut for the United States on March 7, 2001, in a friendly match against Italy. In total, she made nine appearances for the U.S. and scored one goal, earning her final cap on January 29, 2003, in the 2003 Four Nations Tournament against Germany, where she scored the only goal in the 1–0 win.

In club soccer, Hawkins played for the Seattle Sounders Select Women. She later joined the Boston Breakers for the 2003 season, having been selected in the WUSA Draft. She made 15 regular season appearances, scoring 1 goal and recording 2 assists, as well as appearing once in the postseason. She also played for PSV Union Football Club in 2005.

Hawkins later began coaching, having earned her U.S. Soccer "C" license in 2006. She worked as an assistant for the Cabrillo Seahawks, and also coached the Santa Cruz Breakers Academy, Aptos Mariners, and Santa Clara Sporting. In 2007 she worked as an assistant for the Santa Clara Broncos, her alma mater.

== Personal life ==
Hawkins was born in Sitka, Alaska, though she grew up in Olympia, Washington.

== Career statistics ==
=== International ===
United States
Year	Apps	Goals
2001	5	0
2002	2	0
2003	2	1
Total	9	1

=== International goals ===
No.	Date	Location	Opponent	Score	Result	Competition
1	January 29, 2003	Shanghai, China	Germany	1–0	1–0	2003 Four Nations Tournament
