= Kate Markgraf =

American soccer player and sports journalist (born 1976)

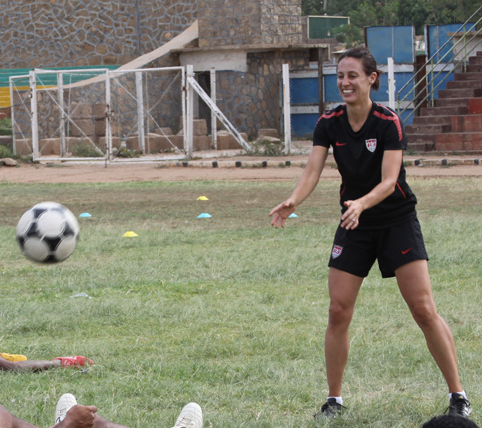
- Markgraf in Ethiopia in July 2012

Personal information
- Full name: Kathryn Michele Markgraf
- Birth name: Kathryn Michele Sobrero
- Date of birth: August 23, 1976 (age 50)
- Place of birth: Pontiac, Michigan, U.S.
- Height: 5 ft 9 in (1.75 m)
- Position: Defender

Team information
- Current team: United States (general manager)

Youth career
- 1991–1994: Detroit Country Day School

College career
| Years | Team | Apps | (Gls) |
| 1994–1997 | Notre Dame Fighting Irish | 97 | (7) |

Senior career*
| Years | Team | Apps | (Gls) |
| 2001–2003 | Boston Breakers | 51 | (0) |
| 2005 | KIF Örebro DFF | 8 | (1) |
| 2006–2009 | Michigan Hawks | 27 | (1) |
| 2010 | Chicago Red Stars | 6 | (0) |

International career
| 1998–2010 | United States | 201 | (1) |

Managerial career
- 2009: Marquette Golden Eagles (assistant)
Medal record
Women's football (soccer)
Representing the United States
Olympic Games
| Gold medal – first place | 2004 Athens | Team competition |
| Gold medal – first place | 2008 Beijing | Team competition |
| Silver medal – second place | 2000 Sydney | Team competition |
FIFA Women's World Cup
| Gold medal – first place | 1999 USA | Team competition |
| Bronze medal – third place | 2003 USA | Team competition |
| Bronze medal – third place | 2007 China | Team competition |
- * Club domestic league appearances and goals

Kathryn Michele Markgraf (née Sobrero; born August 23, 1976) is the former General Manager of the United States women's national soccer team and a retired American professional soccer defender. She previously played for the Chicago Red Stars in the WPS, the Boston Breakers in the WUSA, and the United States women's national soccer team. She was a three-time Olympic medalist (2000, silver; 2004, gold; 2008, gold as team co-captain) and played in three FIFA Women's World Cup (1999, gold; 2003, bronze; 2007, bronze) tournaments. She started in 97% of her 201 United States Women's National Team appearances in her 12-year career. She ended her career with a high school championship, state club championship, NCAA Division I championship, Olympic gold medals, and a FIFA World Cup Championship.

In 2023, she was inducted into the National Soccer Hall of Fame.

== Early life ==
Markgraf was born in Bloomfield Hills, Michigan and attended Detroit Country Day School. At Detroit Country Day, she helped guide the soccer team to the state title in 1991, scoring 16 goals with 26 assists. She was also a volleyball player making the All-League team three times and was recruited at the Division III level. In soccer, she made the NSCAA All-American team one time and was chosen for the All-State team for all three seasons she played.

=== University of Notre Dame ===
Markgraf attended the University of Notre Dame and graduated with a degree in Science-Business. She was a three-time NSCAA All-American, a three-time all Big East selection, the 1997 Big East defensive player of the year, and the defensive MVP of the NCAA's Final Four in 1995, the year in which her team won the NCAA women's soccer championship. She also co-captained the team her senior year. She also earned Dean's List for one semester.

== Playing career ==
=== Club, 2001–2010 ===
Markgraf was a member of the Boston Breakers in the WUSA league for three seasons, and she was named defender of the year for the Breakers in 2001. In 2005, she played professionally for KIF Örebro in the Swedish league alongside longtime USA teammate Kristine Lilly. She was scheduled to play with the Chicago Red Stars in the WUSA's successor, Women's Professional Soccer, in its inaugural 2009 season. However, the Red Stars announced in January 2009 that she would not play that season because she was expecting her second child. Ten months after giving birth to twins, she returned to the Red Stars in 2010, played nearly every minute of the season, and made the All-Star team. 2010 was her final professional season.

=== International, 1998–2010 ===
In 1998, she made her international debut for the United States against Argentina, with Sobrero on the back of her jersey. She switched to Markgraf on the back of her jersey in 2004. She was the least experienced starter in the winning 1999 World Cup team and one of the youngest members of the team. The LA Times selected her to the All-World top 11 for her play at centerback that tournament. She started in the 2000 Olympic Games in Sydney, the 2004 Games in Athens, and was Co-Captain for the 2008 Games in Beijing. She won the silver medal in 2000, the gold in 2004, and the gold in 2008. She played 12 matches in 3 FIFA Women's World Cup, winning the title of World Champion in the 1999 World Cup hosted by the US. She was also a member of the teams that finished third in the 2003 World Cup hosted by the US and the 2007 World Cup hosted by China.

In July 2010, after nearly a two-year break from international competition, she made her 200th career international appearance, in a friendly match against Sweden. She became the 10th woman in FIFA history to earn her 200th cap, a mark no male player has reached. She subsequently announced her retirement from the sport at the end of the WPS season, ending her professional career after playing 201 times for her country.

==== International goals ====
Key (expand for notes on "international goals" and sorting)
| Location | Geographic location of the venue where the competition occurred Sorted by country name first, then by city name |
| Lineup | Start – played entire match on minute (off player) – substituted on at the minute indicated, and player was substituted off at the same time off minute (on player) – substituted off at the minute indicated, and player was substituted on at the same time (c) – captain Sorted by minutes played |
| Min | The minute in the match the goal was scored. For list that include caps, blank indicates played in the match but did not score a goal. |
| Assist/pass | The ball was passed by the player, which assisted in scoring the goal. This column depends on the availability and source of this information. |
| penalty or pk | Goal scored on penalty-kick which was awarded due to foul by opponent. (Goals scored in penalty-shoot-out, at the end of a tied match after extra-time, are not included.) |
| Score | The match score after the goal was scored. Sorted by goal difference, then by goal scored by the player's team |
| Result | The final score. Sorted by goal difference in the match, then by goal difference in penalty-shoot-out if it is taken, followed by goal scored by the player's team in the match, then by goal scored in the penalty-shoot-out. For matches with identical final scores, match ending in extra-time without penalty-shoot-out is a tougher match, therefore precede matches that ended in regulation |
| aet | The score at the end of extra-time; the match was tied at the end of 90' regulation |
| pso | Penalty-shoot-out score shown in parentheses; the match was tied at the end of extra-time |
| | Green background color – exhibition or closed door international friendly match |
NOTE: some keys may not apply for a particular football player

| Goal | Date | Location | Opponent | Lineup | Min | Assist/pass | Score | Result | Competition |
|---|---|---|---|---|---|---|---|---|---|
| 1 | 2008-09-20 | (United States) Bridgeview, IL | Ireland | Start | 31 | penalty | 2–0 | 2–0 | Friendly |

== Broadcasting ==
Markgraf was paired with Adrian Healey as a color commentator on ESPN's secondary broadcast team for the telecasts of the 2011 FIFA Women's World Cup. She worked as a color commentator for NBC during the 2012 London Olympics and 2016 Rio Olympics. She has also worked as commentator for several US women's national team games on Fox Soccer and ESPN, as well as for college soccer on the Big Ten Network. She worked for ESPN FC during the 2015 FIFA Women's World Cup as a studio analyst and often appeared on SportsCenter during the tournament. She continued to work for ESPN in 2016, this time as a color analyst for men's soccer during the UEFA Euro 2016.

== Soccer envoy ==
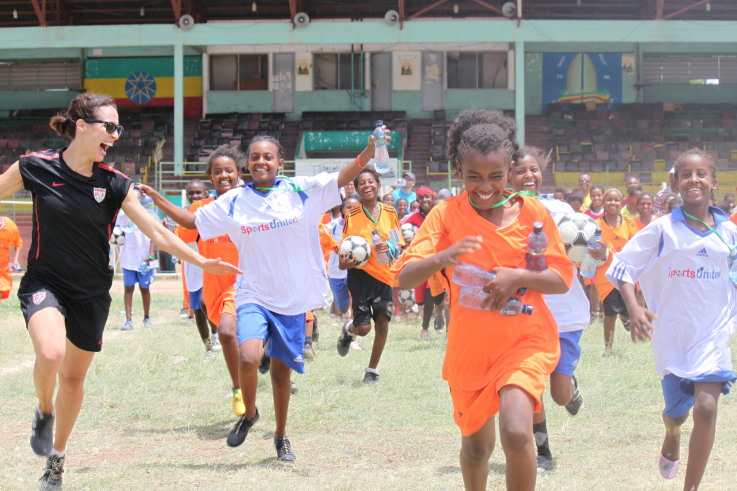
Kate Markgraf running with a girls group during the Soccer Clinic Program in Dire Dawa, Ethiopia from July 11–12, 2012.

In 2012, Kate Markgraf traveled with Tony Sanneh to Ethiopia on behalf of the United States Department of State and US Soccer to work with Somalian youth in the Ethiopian city of Dire Dawa. In 2013, she went to Chile, and in 2014, she went to Peru, again on behalf of the United States Department of State and US Soccer.

== Coaching career ==
In 2009, she was a volunteer assistant coach of the Marquette Golden Eagles. She now only coaches her twins' soccer team.

== Personal life ==
She is a mother of three kids, a son named Keegan in July 2006 and a set of twins, a girl Carson and a boy Xavier, in June of 2009. As of 2008, Markgraf lived with her husband and their children in the Milwaukee area. She has served on the Juvenile Law Center Board and is a member of the Notre Dame Monogram Club Board of Directors, as well as co-sponsored Milwaukee College Prep (MCP; a charter school), a fundraiser benefiting under-served Milwaukee students. She has co-created life-skills programming for Milwaukee America-Scores and runs soccer clinics for various charities. In 2015, she graduated with a Masters in Kinesiology from the University of Wisconsin-Milwaukee with her research being selected to be presented at the Association for Applied Sport Psychology.

== See also ==
- List of footballers with 100 or more caps
- List of Olympic medalists in football
- List of multiple Olympic gold medalists in one event
- List of multiple Olympic gold medalists
- List of 2004 Summer Olympics medal winners
