= Janis Sanchez-Hucles =

American psychologist

- Education: Swarthmore College & University of North Carolina at Chapel Hill
- Occupations: Psychologist & Professor Emerita
- Years active: 1980–present

Janis Sanchez-Hucles is an American psychologist and professor emerita at Old Dominion University. She was appointed chair of its psychology department in 2006.

== Biography ==
The eldest of six children, Janis Sanchez-Hucles was born 1951 in New York state. Her father's side of the family is Cuban-Caribbean American, her mother's from the Southern United States. She is married to Michael Hucles, grandson of coach Henry B. Hucles.

While pursuing her doctorate at University of North Carolina at Chapel Hill, Sanchez-Hucles developed a curiosity for and awareness about different racial groups' relationships with the field of psychology. This would later serve to inform her dedication to making the field of psychology more available to and more able to serve ethnic minorities.

As a professor of psychology at Old Dominion University, she also served as department chair until she retired.

== Education ==
Sanchez-Hucles earned her BA in psychology from Swarthmore College in 1973 and her MS at Purdue University in 1975. She went on to earn her PhD in clinical psychology at the University of North Carolina at Chapel Hill, where she was the second person of color to do so.

== Academic work ==
Apart from her work as a professor emerita and chairperson at Old Dominion, Sanchez-Hucles has been committed in her work to making psychology more accessible to ethnic minorities. In doing so she served on a Task Force of Division 35 at the American Psychological Association, the Task Force on Women, Poverty, and Public Assistance. It explored the needs of women who are ethnic minorities. Though she has said she was at first intimidated, she credits Pamela Trotman Reid with pushing her to start a task force.

In 2003 the APA gave Sanchez-Hucles a Distinguished Contributions to Service Award for her dedication to her work representing and serving Division 45 (Society for the psychology study of ethnic minority issues).

== Research and publications ==
The topics of Sanchez-Hucles's research broadly involve women, especially women of color, and the subject of race. In her article, Women and women of color in leadership: complexity, identity, and intersectionality, Sanchez-Hucles explores ways in which gender and race impact women in leadership positions. Though different in the challenges they face, the article notes that white women and women of color face stereotypes and other challenges that have to do with the intersection of their identities.

Sanchez-Hucles also wrote First Sessions with African-American Clients: A Step by Step Guide, a guide for therapists to help them practice strategies, such as cultural competence and being aware of their own biases, to retain African American clientele. The book somewhat mirrors some ideas from many of her other works, such as Staying The Course: Psychotherapy In The African-American Community. It seeks to address some of the important strategies that will allow therapists to better serve Black clients with culturally sensitivity and awareness.

== Selected works ==
- Sanchez-Hucles, J. V. & Davis, D. D. (2010). Women and women of color in leadership: Complexity, identity, and intersectionality. American Psychologist, 65, 171–181.
- Sanchez-Hucles, J. (2008). Trauma and recovery in its cultural context. Psychology of Women Quarterly, 32, 223–224.
- Sanchez-Hucles, J. & Gamble, K. K. (2006). Trauma in the lives of girls and women. In C. Goodheart & J. Worell (Eds.), Handbook of girl's and women's psychological health (pp. 103–112). New York: Oxford University Press.
- Chin, J. L., Lott, B., Rice, J. & Sanchez-Hucles, J. (Eds.).(2007). Women and leadership:Transforming visions and diverse voices. Malden, MA: Blackwell Publishers.
- Sanchez-Hucles, J. & Jones, N. (2005). Breaking the silence around race in training, practice, and research. The Counseling Psychologist, 33, 547–558.
- Sanchez-Hucles, J. V. (2000). The first session with African-Americans: A step-by-step guide. San Francisco, CA: Jossey Bass.
