= Amos Hostetter Jr. =

American businessman

Amos B. Hostetter Jr.
- Born: Amos Barr Hostetter Jr. January 12, 1937 (age 89); New Jersey, US
- Education: Amherst College (B.A., Economics, 1958); Harvard University (M.B.A., 1961)
- Known for: MediaOne/Continental Cablevision
- Spouse: Barbara Lynn Walsh
- Children: 3 children
- Parent: Amos Hostetter Sr.

Amos Barr Hostetter Jr. (born January 12, 1937) is an American businessman, who was the founder, chairman, and CEO of Continental Cablevision. With an estimated current net worth of around $3.5 billion, he is ranked by Forbes as the 538th richest person in the world as of 2020. He has also served as the chairman of C-SPAN.

== Early life and education ==
Hostetter is the son of the late Amos Hostetter, a prominent trader at Commodities Corporation and Hayden Stone. He attended the Pingry School for his secondary education and graduated in the Class of 1954. After graduating from Amherst College in 1958 with a B.A. in Economics, he obtained a M.B.A. from Harvard University in 1961.

== Career ==
In 1963, Hostetter and his college roommate and fraternity brother, H. Irving Grousbeck, founded Continental Cablevision in Fostoria, Ohio and Tiffin, Ohio. At the time of the company's sale in 1996 to US West, it was the largest privately owned cable company.

Hostetter is currently chairman of Pilot House Associates, LLC.

In 1999, Amos and his wife, Barbara Walsh founded the Barr Foundation which has given out over $710 million in the 21 years since. In 2016, the foundation had assets totaling $1.6 billion and focuses its philanthropy in the Boston region.

== Personal life ==
In 1984, Hostetter married Barbara Lynn Walsh of Lakeville, Connecticut in an Episcopal ceremony. They have three children: Caroline, Elizabeth, and Tripp.

In 2003, Hostetter purchased the historic Second Harrison Gray Otis House on Mount Vernon Street in Boston for an estimated $12 million.

He is a Life Trustee at Amherst College, his alma mater. Barbara and Amos founded the Barr Foundation in Boston and remain trustees. The $1.6 billion foundation, one of the state's largest philanthropies, makes grants for the arts, education, and climate change. Hostetter donated to the Lincoln Project, a Republican-led super PAC.

In 2020, Forbes deputy wealth editor Jennifer Wang awarded Hostetter Jr. a perfect philanthropy score of 5, the highest possible rating; placing him among an exclusive group of just ten Forbes 400 members, alongside Warren Buffett, George Soros, Eli Broad, and others who have each given away at least 20% of their fortune.
