= Maren Meinert =

German football coach and former player (born 1973)

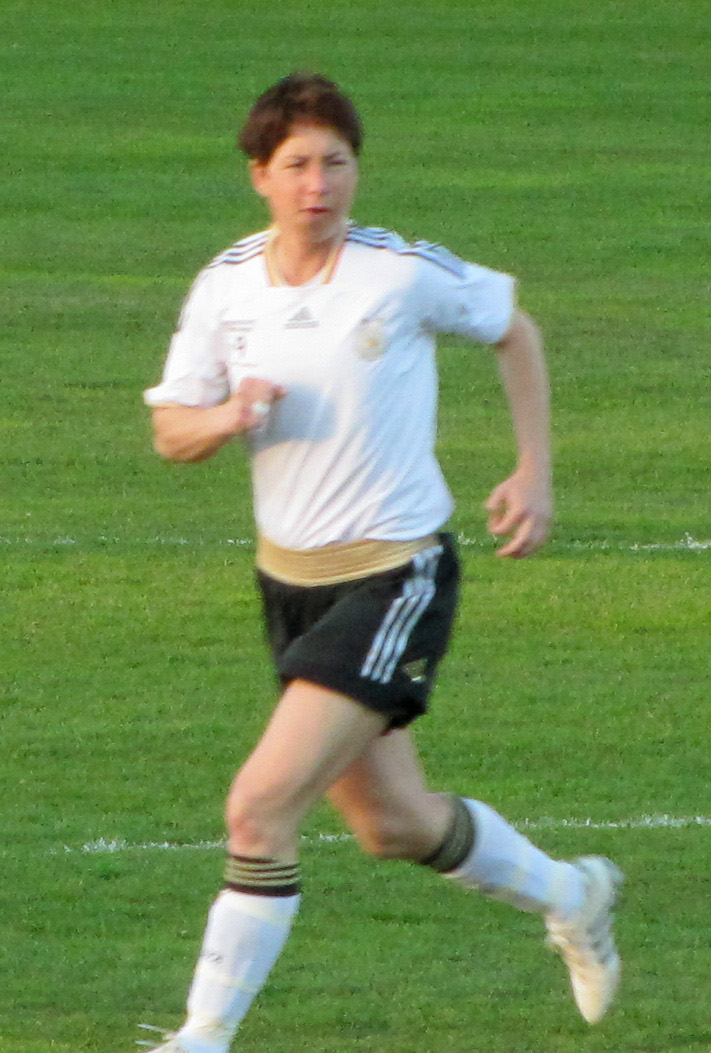
- Meinert during a testimonial in 2012

Personal information
- Full name: Maren Meinert
- Date of birth: 5 August 1973 (age 53)
- Place of birth: Rheinhausen, West Germany
- Height: 1.73 m (5 ft 8 in)
- Positions: Midfielder; forward

Senior career*
Years	Team	Apps	(Gls)
–2000	FCR 2001 Duisburg (Note: Previously known as FC Rumeln-Kaldenhausen before the 1997–98 season)		
2000–2001	FFC Brauweiler Pulheim		
2001–2003	Boston Breakers	59	(24)

International career
1991–2003	Germany	92	(33)

Managerial career
- 2005–2019: Germany U19
- 2006–2018: Germany U20
- 2018: Germany U16
- 2025: Germany
Medal record
Women's football
Representing Germany
Olympic Games
Bronze medal – third place	2000 Sydney	Team competition
- * Club domestic league appearances and goals

Maren Meinert (born 5 August 1973) is a German football coach and former player who played as a midfielder and striker. She was most recently the head coach of Germany women's national under-20 football team.

As a player, Meinert played for German clubs FCR Duisburg and FFC Brauweiler Pulheim, as well as Boston Breakers in the United States. She also represented the Germany women's national football team.

== Club career ==
Meinert was the first player inducted into Boston Breakers' "Pillars of Excellence" during a ceremony held at half-time of the 17 May 2009 game between the Breakers and Washington Freedom.

== International career ==
Meinert played for the German national team between 1991 and 2003, making appearances at three FIFA Women's World Cup finals and the 2000 Summer Olympics.

Germany won the 2003 World Cup. She scored the first goal in the final against Sweden.

== Management career ==
Meinert coached various German youth national teams for the German Football Association (DFB) from 2005 to 2019. In 2018, the DFB asked Meinert to become head coach of the Germany women's national football team after dismissing Steffi Jones, but she turned down the opportunity for personal reasons. Less than a year later, the DFB surprisingly chose not to extend Meinert's contract.

After her departure from the DFB, Meinert was linked to many high-profile positions, including the head coach position at the Irish national team and the assistant position at the United States national team.

== International goals ==
List of international goals scored by Maren Meinert.
No.	Date	Venue	Opponent	Score	Result	Competition
1.	3 July 1993	Cesenatico, Italy	Denmark	1–1	1–3	UEFA Women's Euro 1993
2.	8 December 1993	Tarragona, Spain	Poland	2–0	7–0	Friendly
3.	8 December 1993	Tarragona, Spain	Poland	5–0	7–0	Friendly
4.	31 March 1994	Bielefeld, Germany	Wales	3–0	12–0	UEFA Women's Euro 1995 qualifying
5.	31 March 1994	Bielefeld, Germany	Wales	6–0	12–0	UEFA Women's Euro 1995 qualifying
6.	31 March 1994	Bielefeld, Germany	Wales	11–0	12–0	UEFA Women's Euro 1995 qualifying
7.	5 May 1994	Swansea, Wales	Wales	5–0	12–0	UEFA Women's Euro 1995 qualifying
8.	5 May 1994	Swansea, Wales	Wales	9–0	12–0	UEFA Women's Euro 1995 qualifying
9.	2 June 1994	Zagreb, Croatia	Croatia	4–0	7–0	UEFA Women's Euro 1995 qualifying
10.	27 July 1994	Montreal, Canada	Canada	1–1	2–1	Friendly
11.	2 August 1994	Andernach, Germany	Norway	1–1	6–3	Friendly
12.	21 September 1994	Sindelfingen, Germany	Croatia	7–0	8–0	UEFA Women's Euro 1995 qualifying
13.	25 September 1994	Weingarten, Germany	Switzerland	6–0	11–0	UEFA Women's Euro 1995 qualifying
14.	25 September 1994	Weingarten, Germany	Switzerland	8–0	11–0	UEFA Women's Euro 1995 qualifying
15.	26 March 1995	Kaiserlautern, Germany	Sweden	1–1	3–2	UEFA Women's Euro 1995
16.	13 April 1995	Potsdam, Germany	Poland	4–0	8–0	Friendly
17.	13 April 1995	Potsdam, Germany	Poland	5–0	8–0	Friendly
18.	9 June 1995	Karlstad, Sweden	Brazil	2–1	6–1	1995 FIFA Women's World Cup
19.	13 June 1995	Västerås, Sweden	England	2–0	3–0	1995 FIFA Women's World Cup
20.	20 March 1997	Euskirchen, Germany	China	2–0	2–2	Friendly
21.	27 May 1997	Copenhagen, Denmark	Denmark	2–2	2–2	Friendly
22.	30 June 1997	Moss, Norway	Italy	1–0	1–1	UEFA Women's Euro 1997
23.	14 February 1999	Istanbul, Turkey	Turkey	2–0	12–1	Friendly
24.	28 March 1999	Hamburg, Germany	China	1–1	4–1	Friendly
25.	17 August 2000	Kópavogur, Iceland	Iceland	5–0	6–0	UEFA Women's Euro 2001 qualifying
26.	14 June 2001	Goch, Germany	Canada	3–0	3–0	Friendly
27.	17 June 2001	Oberhausen, Germany	Canada	2–0	7–1	Friendly
28.	23 June 2001	Erfurt, Germany	Sweden	3–1	3–1	UEFA Women's Euro 2001
29.	27 June 2001	Erfurt, Germany	Russia	3–0	5–0	UEFA Women's Euro 2001
30.	27 September 2003	Washington, D.C., United States	Argentina	1–0	6–1	2003 FIFA Women's World Cup
31.	27 September 2003	Washington, D.C., United States	Argentina	4–0	6–1	2003 FIFA Women's World Cup
32.	5 October 2003	Portland, United States	United States	2–0	3–0	2003 FIFA Women's World Cup
33.	12 October 2003	Carson, United States	Sweden	1–0	2–1 (a.e.t.)	2003 FIFA Women's World Cup

== Honours ==
=== Playing honours ===
FC Rumeln-Kaldenhausen

- Hallenmasters: 1995

FCR Duisburg

- Frauen-Bundesliga runners-up: 1997
- DFB-Pokal Frauen: 1998

Germany

- FIFA Women's World Cup
  - Winners: 2003
  - Runners-up: 1995
- Olympic Games bronze medal: 2000
- UEFA Women's Euro: 1995, 1997, 2001

Individual

- Women's United Soccer Association Most Valuable Player: 2003

=== Managerial honours ===
Germany

- FIFA U-20 Women's World Cup
  - Winners: 2010, 2014
  - Runners-up: 2012
- UEFA Women's Under-19 Championship: 2006, 2007, 2011

Individual

- Felix Coach of the Year: 2010

=== General honours ===
- Order of Merit of North Rhine-Westphalia
