= San Diego Spirit =

- Full name: San Diego Spirit
- Founded: 2001
- Dissolved: 2003
- Stadium: Torero Stadium, San Diego, California
- Capacity: 7,000
- Owner: Cox Communications
- League: Women's United Soccer Association (2001-2003)
Home colors	Away colors

The San Diego Spirit were a professional soccer team based in San Diego, California, that competed in the Women's United Soccer Association (WUSA). The team played its home games at Torero Stadium on the campus of the University of San Diego. The Spirit began play in 2001. The league announced on September 15, 2003, it was suspending operations.

The founding members of the Spirit were Julie Foudy, Shannon MacMillan and Joy Fawcett. The team reached the playoffs in the 2003 season, losing to the Atlanta Beat in the semifinals. Other notable members of the Spirit included Scotland's Julie Fleeting, Brazil's Daniela and Canada's Christine Latham, as well as U.S. national team players Jenni Branam, Aly Wagner and Shannon Boxx.

== Year-by-year ==
Year	League	Regular season	Playoffs	Avg. attendance	Total attendance
2001	WUSA	5th Place	Did not qualify	5,711	62,821
2002	WUSA	7th Place	Did not qualify	5,883	58,832
2003	WUSA	3rd Place	Semifinals	5,635	61,983

== Players ==
The "founding players" of the Spirit were Julie Foudy, Shannon MacMillan and Joy Fawcett of the 1999 U.S. Women's World Cup team.

2003 Roster

Note: Flags indicate national team as defined under FIFA eligibility rules; some limited exceptions apply. Players may hold more than one non-FIFA nationality.

No.	Pos.	Nation	Player
2	DF	USA	Amy Sauer
3	DF	USA	Ronnie Fair
5	MF	BRA	Daniela
6	FW	USA	Kerry Connors
7	FW	CHN	Zhang Ouying
8	FW	USA	Shannon MacMillan
9	FW	SCO	Julie Fleeting
10	MF	USA	Aly Wagner

No.	Pos.	Nation	Player
11	MF	USA	Julie Foudy
12	MF	USA	Jen Mascaro
13	MF	USA	Jennifer Nielsen
14	DF	USA	Joy Fawcett
16	DF	USA	Kim Pickup
17	FW	CAN	Christine Latham
18	GK	USA	Jaime Pagliarulo
24	GK	USA	Jenni Branam

Coach: Omid Namazi

== Coaches ==
- Carlos Juarez (2001-2002)
- Kevin Crow (2002)
- Omid Namazi (2003)

== League suspension ==
The WUSA announced on September 15, 2003, that it was suspending operations.

== See also ==
- List of soccer clubs in the United States
- Women's association football
