= Kristine Lilly =

American soccer player (born 1971)

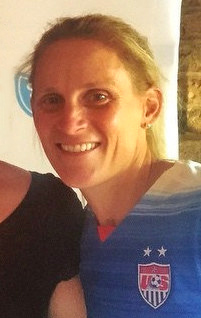
- Lilly in 2015

Personal information
- Full name: Kristine Marie Lilly Heavey
- Birth name: Kristine Marie Lilly
- Date of birth: July 22, 1971 (age 55)
- Place of birth: New York City, U.S.
- Height: 5 ft 4 in (1.63 m)
- Positions: Forward; midfielder

College career
Years	Team	Apps	(Gls)
1989–1992	North Carolina Tar Heels		

Senior career*
Years	Team	Apps	(Gls)
1994	Tyresö FF		
1995	Washington Warthogs (indoor)	6	(0)
1998	Delaware Genies	4	(5)
2001–2003	Boston Breakers	59	(14)
2005	KIF Örebro DFF	19	(8)
2009–2011	Boston Breakers	20	(3)

International career
1987–2010	United States	354	(130)
Medal record
Women's soccer
Representing United States
Olympic Games
Gold medal – first place	1996 Atlanta	Team
Gold medal – first place	2004 Athens	Team
Silver medal – second place	2000 Sydney	Team
FIFA Women's World Cup
Winner	1991 China
Winner	1999 United States
Bronze medal – third place	1995 Sweden
Bronze medal – third place	2003 United States
Bronze medal – third place	2007 China
- * Club domestic league appearances and goals

Kristine Marie Lilly Heavey (née Lilly; born July 22, 1971) is an American former professional soccer player. She was a member of the United States women's national team for 23 years and is the most-capped football player in the history of the sport, gaining her 354th and final cap against Mexico in a World Cup qualifier in November 2010. Lilly scored 130 international goals for the US national team, making her the team's fourth-highest goal scorer behind Carli Lloyd's 134, Mia Hamm's 158 goals, and Abby Wambach's 184.

== Early life ==
Lilly was born in New York City and attended Wilton High School in Wilton, Connecticut. While still attending high school, Lilly became a member of the United States women's national team. She was recruited by the University of North Carolina at Chapel Hill.

=== University of North Carolina ===
Lilly competed as a student-athlete, playing for the university's North Carolina Tar Heels women's soccer team from 1989 to 1992. During her time there, she won the NCAA Women's Soccer Championship every year she played. She won the Hermann Trophy as a junior in 1991. As a senior, she won the Honda Sports Award as the nations's top soccer player. To honor her time with the school, North Carolina retired her #15 jersey in 1994.

== Club career ==
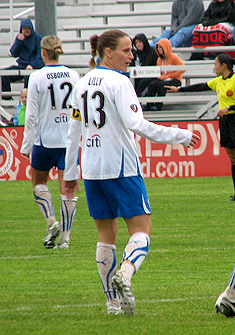
Lilly with the Boston Breakers in 2010

Lilly began her career with Tyresö FF of Sweden in 1994. She spent one season with the club before returning to the United States. On August 20, 1995, Lilly joined Washington Warthogs of the now-defunct Continental Indoor Soccer League. She was the only woman in the all-male professional indoor league, following in the footsteps of Collette Cunningham and Shannon Presley who had played in the league sparingly in 1994.

Lilly joined W-League side Delaware Genies in 1998. With the club, she appeared in four games, scoring five goals and providing two assists.

February 2001 saw the formation of the world's first women's professional soccer league in which all the players were paid. Women's United Soccer Association (WUSA) had its inaugural season in 2001. Lilly was the team captain and a founding member of the Boston Breakers. In her first season with the team, she appeared in all twenty-one matches and played every minute of the season. She led the league in assists with eleven and added three goals. For her performance, she was named First Team All-WUSA. In 2002, she started in a further nineteen games. She increased her point total for the season, scoring eight goals and assisting on thirteen others. She was again named First Team All-WUSA and was a starter on the WUSA North All-Star Team. In 2003 Lilly started all nineteen games in which she played, chipping in three goals and four assists and again being named to First Team All-WUSA, the only player in the history of the league to do so. Following the 2003 season, the WUSA ceased operations.

Following the termination of the league, Lilly followed former Boston Breakers head coach Pia Sundhage to Sweden to play for Damallsvenskan club KIF Örebro DFF in 2005. There she was joined by fellow USWNT teammate Christie Welsh as well as USWNT and Boston Breakers teammate Kate Markgraf.

In late-2006 and early-2007, the formation of a new women's league took shape under the name of Women's Professional Soccer (WPS). On September 16, 2008, Lilly was allocated to Boston Breakers along with USWNT teammates Angela Hucles and Heather Mitts. The inaugural 2009 Women's Professional Soccer season saw Lilly appear in all twenty games (playing every minute) and score three goals with three assists.

== International career ==
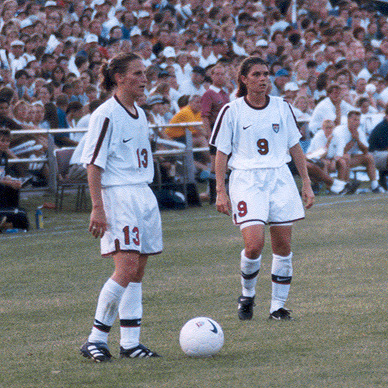
Lilly (left) with Mia Hamm in St. Louis, 1998

Lilly made her debut for the United States national team in 1987, when she was still attending high school. During her international career, she surpassed the previous women's world record of 151 caps, held by Norway's Heidi Støre, on May 21, 1998. On January 30, 1999, she surpassed what was then the men's record of 164 caps, held by Adnan Al-Talyani of the United Arab Emirates.

Lilly has participated in the 1991, 1995, 1999, 2003, and 2007 editions of the FIFA Women's World Cup. She is a two-time World Cup champion, winning in 1991 and 1999; during extra time of the '99 Final against China, Lilly, standing on the goal line, blocked a Chinese shot which had passed goalkeeper Briana Scurry – since the tournament took place with the golden goal rule in effect, the game would have been over if China had scored – and in the ensuing shootout, she scored the goal which would give the US the lead. When she played against North Korea on September 11, 2007, in the 2007 FIFA Women's World Cup, she became the first woman (and only the third player overall) to participate in five different World Cup Finals; by scoring a goal against England on September 22, 2007, she became the oldest woman to score in the World Cup.

Lilly has also competed in the 1996, 2000, and 2004 editions of the Olympic Games. She won a gold medal in 1996 and 2004, and a silver medal in 2000. She missed the 2008 Summer Olympics due to the birth of her child.

Unlike several of her longtime teammates (among them Joy Fawcett, Julie Foudy, and Mia Hamm), she did not retire after the team's "farewell tour" which finished on December 8, 2004.

On January 18, 2006, Lilly made her 300th international appearance in a game against Norway. In the same match, she equaled Michelle Akers for second place on the team's all-time goal scoring list with 105. Lilly was named as a finalist for the 2006 FIFA Women's World Player of the Year. She finished second in the voting to Brazil's Marta.

After the birth of her daughter, Lilly returned to the national team in December 2008. Her last match for the national team, representing her record 354th cap, was a World Cup qualifying loss to Mexico (1–2) on November 5, 2010, in which she played for six minutes as a substitute.

== Coaching career ==
After retirement Kristine served as an Assistant Coach with the University of Texas Women’s Soccer Team from 2014 to 2017.

== Personal life ==
Lilly grew up in Wilton, Connecticut, and lives in Medfield, Massachusetts. She is married to Brookline firefighter David Heavey, a former hockey player and golfer at the University of Connecticut. Lilly gave birth to her first daughter Sidney Marie Heavey on her birthday, July 22, 2008, and her second daughter Jordan Mary Heavey on September 2, 2011.

She appeared in the HBO documentary Dare to Dream: The Story of the U.S. Women's Soccer Team. Lilly helps run a soccer camp with Mia Hamm and Tisha Venturini-Hoch.

== Career statistics ==
=== Club ===
Appearances and goals by club, season and competition
Club	Season	League		
Club	Season	Division	Apps	Goals
Tyresö FF	1994			
Washington Warthogs	1995	CISL		
Delaware Genies	1998	W-League	4	5
Boston Breakers	2001	WUSA	21	3
Boston Breakers	2002	WUSA	19	8
Boston Breakers	2003	WUSA	19	3
KIF Örebro DFF	2005			
Boston Breakers	2009	WPS	4	4
Career total				

=== Matches and goals scored at World Cup and Olympic tournaments ===
Kristine Lilly competed in five FIFA Women's World Cup: China 1991, Sweden 1995, USA 1999, USA 2003 and China 2007; and three Olympics: Atlanta 1996, Sydney 2000, and Athens 2004; altogether played in 46 matches and scored 12 goals at those eight global tournaments. With her USA teams, in eight world cup and olympic tournaments, Lilly had 39 wins, 3 losses, and 4 draws; finished first place with her teams 4 times, second place once and third place 3 times.

Key (expand for notes on "world cup and olympic goals")
Location	Geographic location of the venue where the competition occurred
Lineup	Start – played entire match on minute (off player) – substituted on at the minute indicated, and player was substituted off at the same time off minute (on player) – substituted off at the minute indicated, and player was substituted on at the same time (c) – captain
Min	The minute in the match the goal was scored. For list that include caps, blank indicates played in the match but did not score a goal.
Assist/pass	The ball was passed by the player, which assisted in scoring the goal. This column depends on the availability and source of this information.
penalty or pk	Goal scored on penalty-kick which was awarded due to foul by opponent. (Goals scored in penalty-shoot-out, at the end of a tied match after extra-time, are not included.)
Score	The match score after the goal was scored.
Result	The final score. W – match was won L – match was lost to opponent D – match was drawn (W) – penalty-shoot-out was won after a drawn match (L) – penalty-shoot-out was lost after a drawn match
aet	The score at the end of extra-time; the match was tied at the end of 90' regulation
pso	Penalty-shoot-out score shown in parentheses; the match was tied at the end of extra-time
	Pink background color – Olympic women's football tournament
	Blue background color – FIFA women's world cup final tournament

Goal	Match	Date	Location	Opponent	Lineup	Min	Score	Result	Competition
China 1991 FIFA Women's World Cup
	1	1991-11-17	Panyu	Sweden	off 33' (on Hamilton)			3–2 W	Group stage
	2	1991-11-19	Panyu	Brazil	off 67' (on Belkin)			5–0 W	Group stage
	3	1991-11-21	Foshan	Japan	off 41' (on Akers)			3–0 W	Group stage
	4	1991-11-24	Foshan	Chinese Taipei	Start			7–0 W	Quarter-final
	5	1991-11-27	Guangzhou	Germany	Start			5–2 W	Semifinal
	6	1991-11-30	Guangzhou	Norway	Start			2–1 W	Final
Sweden 1995 FIFA Women's World Cup
	7	1995-06-06	Gävle	China	Start			3–3 D	Group stage
1	8	1995-06-08	Gävle	Denmark	Start	9	1–0	2–0 W	Group stage
	9	1995-06-10	Helsingborg	Australia	Start			4–1 W	Group stage
2	10	1995-06-13	Gävle	Japan	off 68' (on Bryan)	8	1–0	4–0 W	Quarter-final
3	10	1995-06-13	Gävle	Japan	off 68' (on Bryan)	42	2–0	4–0 W	Quarter-final
	11	1995-06-15	Västerås	Norway	Start			0–1 L	Semifinal
	12	1995-06-17	Gävle	China	Start			2–0 W	Third place match
Atlanta 1996 Olympic Women's Football Tournament
	13	1996-07-21	Orlando	Nigeria	Start			3–0 W	Group stage
	14	1996-07-23	Orlando	Korea DPR	Start			2–1 W	Group stage
	15	1996-07-25	Miami	Germany	Start			0–0 D	Group stage
	16	1996-07-28	Athens	Brazil	Start			2–1 aet W	Semifinal
	17	1996-08-01	Athens	China	Start			2–1 W	Gold medal match
USA 1999 FIFA Women's World Cup
4	18	1999-06-19	E Rutherford	Denmark	Start	89	3–0	3–0 W	Group stage
5	19	1999-06-24	Chicago	Nigeria	Start	32	4–1	7–1 W	Group stage
	20	1999-06-27	Boston	Korea DPR	Start			3–0 W	Group stage
	21	1999-07-01	Washington	Germany	Start			3–2 W	Quarter-final
	22	1999-07-04	San Francisco	Brazil	Start			2–0 W	Semifinal
	23	1999-07-10	Los Angeles	China	Start			0–0 (pso 5–4) (W)	Final
Sydney 2000 Olympic Women's Football Tournament
	24	2000-09-14	Melbourne	Norway	Start			2–0 W	Group stage
	25	2000-09-17	Melbourne	China	Start			1–1 D	Group stage
6	26	2000-09-20	Melbourne	Nigeria	off 45' (on Serlenga)	35	2–0	3–1 W	Group stage
	27	2000-09-24	Canberra	Brazil	Start			1–0 W	Semifinal
	28	2000-09-28	Sydney	Norway	Start			2–3 aet L	Gold medal match
USA 2003 FIFA Women's World Cup
7	29	2003-09-21	Washington	Sweden	Start	27	1–0	3–1 W	Group stage
	30	2003-09-25	Philadelphia	Nigeria	Start			5–0 W	Group stage
	31	2003-09-28	Columbus	Korea DPR	off 45' (on Foudy)			3–0 W	Group stage
	32	2003-10-01	Foxborough	Norway	Start			1–0 W	Quarter-final
	33	2003-10-05	Portland	Germany	Start			0–3 L	Semifinal
8	34	2003-10-11	Carson	Canada	Start	22	1–0	3–1 W	Third place match
Athens 2004 Olympic Women's Football Tournament
	35	2004-08-11	Heraklion	Greece	Start			3–0 W	Group stage
	36	2004-08-14	Thessaloniki	Brazil	off 69' (on O'Reilly)			2–0 W	Group stage
9	37	2004-08-17	Thessaloniki	Australia	Start	19	1–0	1–1 D	Group stage
10	38	2004-08-20	Thessaloniki	Japan	Start	43	1–0	2–1 W	Quarter-final
11	39	2004-08-23	Heraklion	Germany	Start	33	1–0	2–1 aet W	Semifinal
	40	2004-08-26	Piraeus	Brazil	Start			2–1 aet W	Gold medal match
China 2007 FIFA Women's World Cup
	41	2007-09-11	Chengdu	Korea DPR	Start; (c)			2–2 D	Group stage
	42	2007-09-14	Chengdu	Sweden	Start; (c)			2–0 W	Group stage
	43	2007-09-18	Shanghai	Nigeria	off 84' (on Tarpley); (c)			1–0 W	Group stage
12	44	2007-09-22	Tianjin	England	Start; (c)	60	3–0	3–0 W	Quarter-final
	45	2007-09-27	Hangzhou	Brazil	Start; (c)			0–4 L	Semifinal
	46	2007-09-30	Shanghai	Norway	off 89' (on Kai); (c)			4–1 W	Third place match

== International goals ==
No.	Date	Venue	Opponent	Score	Result	Competition
1.	13 August 1987	Shenyang, China	China	1–?	1–1	Friendly
2.	27 July 1990	Winnipeg, Canada	Canada	1–?	4–1	Friendly
3.	5 April 1991	Varna, Bulgaria	France	1–0	2–0	Friendly
4.	7 April 1991	Varna, Bulgaria	Soviet Union	1–0	5–0	Friendly
5.	25 April 1991	Port-au-Prince, Haiti	Haiti	?–0	10–0	1991 CONCACAF Women's Championship
6.	28 April 1991	Port-au-Prince, Haiti	Canada	3–0	5–0	1991 CONCACAF Women's Championship
7.	28 May 1991	Vianen, Netherlands	Netherlands	?–?	3–4	Friendly
8.	1 September 1991	Medford, United States	Norway	1–?	1–2	Friendly
9.	12 October 1991	Fairfax, United States	China	1–0	2–0	Friendly
10.	10 April 1993	Atlanta, United States	Germany	1–0	3–0	Friendly
11.	10 April 1993	Atlanta, United States	Germany	3–0	3–0	Friendly
12.	12 June 1993	Cincinnati, United States	Canada	3–0	7–0	Friendly
13.	15 June 1993	Mansfield, United States	Italy	?–0	5–0	Friendly
14.	7 July 1993	Hamilton, Canada	Australia	?–0	6–0	Friendly
15.	12 July 1993	Hamilton, Canada	Chinese Taipei	2–?	3–1	Friendly
16.	14 July 1993	Hamilton, Canada	Russia	2–0	2–0	Friendly
17.	4 August 1993	New Hyde Park, United States	New Zealand	?–0	3–0	1993 CONCACAF Women's Invitational Tournament
18.	6 August 1993	New Hyde Park, United States	Trinidad and Tobago	?–0	9–0	1993 CONCACAF Women's Invitational Tournament
19.	16 March 1994	Silves, Portugal	Portugal	2–0	5–0	1994 Algarve Cup
20.	10 April 1994	Scarborough, Trinidad and Tobago	Trinidad and Tobago	3–?	3–1	Friendly
21.	13 August 1994	Montreal, Canada	Mexico	?–0	9–0	1994 CONCACAF Women's Championship
22.	13 August 1994	Montreal, Canada	Mexico	?–0	9–0	1994 CONCACAF Women's Championship
23.	17 August 1994	Montreal, Canada	Trinidad and Tobago	?–?	11–1	1994 CONCACAF Women's Championship
24.	19 August 1994	Montreal, Canada	Haiti	?–0	10–0	1994 CONCACAF Women's Championship
25.	19 August 1994	Montreal, Canada	Haiti	?–0	10–0	1994 CONCACAF Women's Championship
26.	24 February 1995	Orlando, United States	Denmark	?–0	7–0	Friendly
27.	14 March 1995	Faro, Portugal	Portugal	1–0	2–0	1995 Algarve Cup
28.	15 April 1995	Strasbourg, France	France	2–0	3–0	Friendly
29.	30 April 1995	Davidson, United States	Finland	1–0	6–0	Friendly
30.	19 May 1995	Dallas, United States	Canada	6–?	9–1	Friendly
31.	19 May 1995	Dallas, United States	Canada	7–?	9–1	Friendly
32.	8 June 1995	Gävle, Sweden	Denmark	1–0	2–0	1995 FIFA Women's World Cup
33.	13 June 1995	Gävle, Sweden	Japan	1–0	4–0	1995 FIFA Women's World Cup
34.	13 June 1995	Gävle, Sweden	Japan	2–0	4–0	1995 FIFA Women's World Cup
35.	3 August 1995	Piscataway, United States	Australia	?–?	4–2	1995 Women's U.S. Cup
36.	10 February 1996	Orlando, United States	Denmark	1–?	2–1	Friendly
37.	16 March 1996	Davidson, United States	Germany	2–0	2–0	Friendly
38.	20 April 1996	Fullerton, United States	Netherlands	3–0	6–0	Friendly
39.	20 April 1996	Fullerton, United States	Netherlands	4–0	6–0	Friendly
40.	26 April 1996	St. Louis, United States	France	2–0	4–1	Friendly
41.	16 May 1996	Horsham, United States	Japan	2–0	4–0	1996 Women's U.S. Cup
42.	16 May 1996	Horsham, United States	Japan	3–0	4–0	1996 Women's U.S. Cup
43.	4 July 1996	Pensacola, United States	Australia	2–?	2–1	Friendly
44.	3 March 1997	Bathurst, Australia	Australia	2–?	3–1	Friendly
45.	24 April 1997	Greensboro, United States	France	4–2	4–2	Friendly
46.	4 May 1997	St. Charles, United States	South Korea	1–0	6–1	Friendly
47.	11 May 1997	Portland, United States	England	5–0	6–0	Friendly
48.	5 June 1997	Ambler, United States	Australia	7–0	9–1	1997 Women's U.S. Cup
49.	9 October 1997	Duisburg, Germany	Germany	1–0	1–3	Friendly
50.	1 November 1997	Chattanooga, United States	Sweden	2–0	3–1	Friendly
51.	17 March 1998	Loulé, Portugal	China	3–?	4–1	1998 Algarve Cup
52.	21 March 1998	Quarteira, Portugal	Sweden	3–1	3–1	1998 Algarve Cup
53.	26 April 1998	Fullerton, United States	Argentina	1–0	7–0	Friendly
54.	21 May 1998	Kobe, Japan	Japan	1–0	2–0	Friendly
55.	24 May 1998	Tokyo, Japan	Japan	2–0	3–0	Friendly
56.	12 September 1998	Foxborough, United States	Mexico	2–0	9–0	1998 Women's U.S. Cup
57.	12 September 1998	Foxborough, United States	Mexico	5–0	9–0	1998 Women's U.S. Cup
58.	27 January 1999	Orlando, United States	Portugal	2–0	7–0	Friendly
59.	27 January 1999	Orlando, United States	Portugal	5–0	7–0	Friendly
60.	27 January 1999	Orlando, United States	Portugal	6–0	7–0	Friendly
61.	30 January 1999	Fort Lauderdale, United States	Portugal	1–0	6–0	Friendly
62.	30 January 1999	Fort Lauderdale, United States	Portugal	4–0	6–0	Friendly
63.	18 March 1999	Albufeira, Portugal	Norway	2–1	2–1	1999 Algarve Cup
64.	28 March 1999	Pasadena, United States	Mexico	2–0	3–0	Friendly
65.	28 March 1999	Pasadena, United States	Mexico	3–0	3–0	Friendly
66.	13 May 1999	Milwaukee, United States	Netherlands	3–0	5–0	Friendly
67.	22 May 1999	Orlando, United States	Brazil	2–0	3–0	Friendly
68.	3 June 1999	Beaverton, United States	Australia	3–0	4–0	Friendly
69.	6 June 1999	Portland, United States	Canada	3–2	4–2	Friendly
70.	19 June 1999	East Rutherford, United States	Denmark	3–0	3–0	1999 FIFA Women's World Cup
71.	24 June 1999	Chicago, United States	Nigeria	4–1	7–1	1999 FIFA Women's World Cup
72.	4 September 1999	Foxboro, United States	Republic of Ireland	5–0	5–0	Friendly
73.	7 October 1999	Kansas City, United States	Finland	4–0	6–0	1999 Women's U.S. Cup
74.	7 October 1999	Kansas City, United States	Finland	5–0	6–0	1999 Women's U.S. Cup
75.	10 October 1999	Louisville, United States	Brazil	2–2	4–2	1999 Women's U.S. Cup
76.	10 October 1999	Louisville, United States	Brazil	4–2	4–2	1999 Women's U.S. Cup
77.	6 February 2000	Fort Lauderdale, United States	Norway	2–1	2–3	Friendly
78.	5 April 2000	Davidson, United States	Iceland	7–0	8–0	Friendly
79.	5 May 2000	Portland, United States	Mexico	2–0	8–0	2000 Women's U.S. Cup
80.	20 August 2000	Kansas City, United States	Canada	1–0	1–1	Friendly
81.	20 September 2000	Melbourne, Australia	Nigeria	2–0	3–1	2000 Summer Olympics
82.	10 December 2000	Houston, United States	Mexico	1–0	3–2	Friendly
83.	12 January 2002	Charleston, United States	Mexico	2–0	7–0	Friendly
84.	6 October 2002	Cary, United States	Italy	1–0	4–0	2002 Women's U.S. Cup
85.	6 November 2002	Seattle, United States	Costa Rica	7–0	7–0	2002 CONCACAF Women's Gold Cup
86.	26 April 2003	Washington, D.C., United States	Canada	2–1	6–1	Friendly
87.	21 September 2003	Washington, D.C., United States	Sweden	1–0	3–1	2003 FIFA Women's World Cup
88.	11 October 2003	Carson, United States	Canada	1–0	3–1	2003 FIFA Women's World Cup
89.	25 February 2004	San José, Costa Rica	Trinidad and Tobago	2–0	7–0	2004 CONCACAF Women's Pre-Olympic Tournament
90.	3 March 2004	San José, Costa Rica	Costa Rica	3–0	4–0	2004 CONCACAF Women's Pre-Olympic Tournament
91.	17 August 2004	Thessaloniki, Greece	Australia	1–0	1–1	2004 Summer Olympics
92.	20 August 2004	Thessaloniki, Greece	Japan	1–0	2–1	2004 Summer Olympics
93.	23 August 2004	Heraklio, Greece	Germany	1–0	2–1 (a.e.t.)	2004 Summer Olympics
94.	29 September 2004	Pittsburgh, United States	Iceland	3–0	3–0	Friendly
95.	3 October 2004	Portland, United States	New Zealand	4–0	5–0	Friendly
96.	10 October 2004	Cincinnati, United States	New Zealand	2–0	6–0	Friendly
97.	13 March 2005	Vila Real de Santo António, Portugal	Denmark	1–0	4–0	2005 Algarve Cup
98.	13 March 2005	Vila Real de Santo António, Portugal	Denmark	4–0	4–0	2005 Algarve Cup
99.	10 July 2005	Portland, United States	Ukraine	2–0	7–0	Friendly
100.	23 October 2005	Charleston, United States	Mexico	1–0	3–0	Friendly
101.	18 January 2006	Guangzhou, China	Norway	1–0	3–1	2006 Four Nations Tournament
102.	22 January 2006	Guangzhou, China	China	1–0	2–0	2006 Four Nations Tournament
103.	22 January 2006	Guangzhou, China	China	2–0	2–0	2006 Four Nations Tournament
104.	11 March 2006	Faro, Portugal	Denmark	4–0	5–0	2006 Algarve Cup
105.	13 March 2006	Faro, Portugal	France	1–0	4–1	2006 Algarve Cup
106.	15 July 2006	Blaine, United States	Sweden	3–2	3–2	Friendly
107.	1 October 2006	Carson, United States	Chinese Taipei	5–0	10–0	Friendly
108.	29 October 2006	Gimhae, South Korea	Denmark	1–1	1–1	2006 Peace Queen Cup
109.	31 October 2006	Cheonan, South Korea	Australia	1–0	2–0	2006 Peace Queen Cup
110.	4 November 2006	Seoul, South Korea	Canada	1–0	1–0	2006 Peace Queen Cup
111.	26 November 2006	Carson, United States	Canada	2–1	2–1 (a.e.t.)	2006 CONCACAF Women's Gold Cup
112.	7 March 2007	Faro, Portugal	China	1–0	2–1	2007 Algarve Cup
113.	14 March 2007	Vila Real de Santo António, Portugal	Denmark	1–0	2–0	2007 Algarve Cup
114.	14 April 2007	Foxboro, United States	Mexico	3–0	5–0	Friendly
115.	14 April 2007	Foxboro, United States	Mexico	4–0	5–0	Friendly
116.	12 May 2007	Frisco, United States	Canada	4–1	6–2	Friendly
117.	23 June 2007	East Rutherford, United States	Brazil	1–0	2–0	Friendly
118.	28 July 2007	San Jose, United States	Japan	3–0	4–1	Friendly
119.	12 August 2007	Chicago, United States	New Zealand	2–0	6–1	Friendly
120.	25 August 2007	Carson, United States	Finland	2–0	4–0	
121.	22 September 2007	Tianjin, China	England	3–0	3–0	2007 FIFA Women's World Cup
122.	13 October 2007	St. Louis, United States	Mexico	3–1	5–1	Friendly
123.	17 October 2007	Portland, United States	Mexico	1–0	4–0	Friendly
124.	22 May 2010	Cleveland, United States	Germany	3–0	4–0	Friendly

== Honors and awards ==
Year	Team	Championship/Medal/Award
1989	University of North Carolina	NCAA National Champion
1990	University of North Carolina	NCAA National Champion
1991	USA WNT	FIFA World Cup Champion
1991	University of North Carolina	NCAA National Champion
1992	University of North Carolina	NCAA National Champion
1992	University of North Carolina	Honda Sports Award
1995	USA WNT	FIFA World Cup Bronze
1996	USA WNT	Olympic Gold
1999	USA WNT	FIFA World Cup Champion
2000	USA WNT	Olympic Silver
2003	USA WNT	FIFA World Cup Bronze
2004	USA WNT	Olympic Gold
2007	USA WNT	FIFA World Cup Bronze
2015	None	Inducted into the National Soccer Hall of Fame

== See also ==
- List of women's association football players with 100 or more international goals
- List of women's footballers with 100 or more caps
- List of University of North Carolina at Chapel Hill Olympians
- List of Olympic medalists in football
- List of 2004 Summer Olympics medal winners
- All-time Boston Breakers (WPS) roster

Preceded by Julie Foudy	WNT captain 2004–2008	Succeeded by Christie Rampone
