= Dagny Mellgren =

Norwegian footballer (born 1978)

Personal information
- Full name: Dagny Mellgren Haugland
- Birth name: Dagny Mellgren
- Date of birth: 19 June 1978 (age 48)
- Place of birth: Stavanger, Norway
- Height: 1.65 m (5 ft 5 in)
- Position: Forward

Youth career
- –1996: Ålgård FK
- 1996–1997: Klepp IL

Senior career*
Years	Team	Apps	(Gls)
1997–1998	Klepp IL	27	(15)
1999–2000	Arna-Bjørnar	43	(16)
2001–2003	Boston Breakers	59	(36)
2004–2005	Klepp IL	29	(1)
Total		158	(68)

International career
1996–1997	Norway U20	4	(0)
1998	Norway U21	4	(2)
1999–2005	Norway	95	(49)
Medal record
Women's football
Representing Norway
Summer Olympics
Gold medal – first place	2000 Sydney	Team
UEFA Women's Championship
Runner-up	2005 England
- * Club domestic league appearances and goals

Dagny Mellgren Haugland (née Mellgren; born 19 June 1978) from Ålgård is a former Norwegian footballer.

== Career ==
She retired in December 2005 while playing for Klepp. She has also played for Boston Breakers, in the WUSA. She scored the golden goal in the final against the United States at the 2000 Summer Olympics, winning the gold medal for Norway. She retired from football in December 2005.

== Personal life ==
Mellgren and her partner Gert Haugland had a child in September 2006.

== Career statistics ==
=== International goals ===
No.	Date	Venue	Opponent	Score	Result	Competition
1.	26 June 1999	Chicago, United States	Japan	4–0	4–0	1999 FIFA Women's World Cup
2.	12 March 2000	Lagoa, Portugal	Finland	2–0	2–0	2000 Algarve Cup
3.	16 March 2000	Portimão, Portugal	China	1–0	3–0	2000 Algarve Cup
4.	16 March 2000	Portimão, Portugal	China	2–0	3–0	2000 Algarve Cup
5.	16 March 2000	Portimão, Portugal	China	3–0	3–0	2000 Algarve Cup
6.	4 June 2000	Moss, Norway	England	1–0	8–0	UEFA Women's Euro 2001 qualifying
7.	4 June 2000	Moss, Norway	England	5–0	8–0	UEFA Women's Euro 2001 qualifying
8.	17 September 2000	Canberra, Australia	Nigeria	1–0	3–1	2000 Summer Olympics
9.	28 September 2000	Sydney, Australia	United States	3–2	3–2 (a.e.t.)	2000 Summer Olympics
10.	11 March 2001	Albufeira, Portugal	Finland	1–0	5–1	2001 Algarve Cup
11.	11 March 2001	Albufeira, Portugal	Finland	2–0	5–1	2001 Algarve Cup
12.	25 June 2001	Ulm, Germany	France	3–0	3–0	UEFA Women's Euro 2001
13.	28 June 2001	Reutlingen, Germany	Italy	1–1	1–1	UEFA Women's Euro 2001
14.	8 September 2001	Lillestrøm, Norway	Ukraine	3–0	4–0	2003 FIFA Women's World Cup qualification
15.	11 September 2001	Kongsvinger, Norway	Czech Republic	1–0	5–0	2003 FIFA Women's World Cup qualification
16.	13 October 2001	Cannes, France	France	3–0	3–0	2003 FIFA Women's World Cup qualification
17.	1 March 2002	Albufeira, Portugal	England	1–0	3–1	2002 Algarve Cup
18.	3 March 2002	Ferreiras, Portugal	Sweden	1–0	3–3	2002 Algarve Cup
19.	5 March 2002	Lagos, Portugal	United States	2–1	3–2	2002 Algarve Cup
20.	9 May 2002	Halden, Norway	France	1–0	3–1	2003 FIFA Women's World Cup qualification
21.	9 May 2002	Halden, Norway	France	2–1	3–1	2003 FIFA Women's World Cup qualification
22.	9 May 2002	Halden, Norway	France	3–1	3–1	2003 FIFA Women's World Cup qualification
23.	23 January 2003	Yiwu, China	United States	1–1	1–3	2003 Four Nations Tournament
24.	26 January 2003	Wuhan, China	Germany	1–0	2–2	2003 Four Nations Tournament
25.	14 March 2003	Olhão, Portugal	Sweden	1–0	1–1	2003 Algarve Cup
26.	18 March 2003	Vila Real de Santo António, Portugal	Canada	1–0	1–0	2003 Algarve Cup
27.	20 March 2003	Quarteira, Portugal	France	1–0	1–0	2003 Algarve Cup
28.	11 May 2003	Kristiansand, Norway	Belgium	3–0	6–0	UEFA Women's Euro 2005 qualifying
29.	20 September 2003	Philadelphia, United States	France	2–0	2–0	2003 FIFA Women's World Cup
30.	27 September 2003	Foxborough, United States	South Korea	2–0	7–1	2003 FIFA Women's World Cup
31.	27 September 2003	Foxborough, United States	South Korea	3–0	7–1	2003 FIFA Women's World Cup
32.	16 November 2003	Las Rozas de Madrid, Spain	Spain	1–0	2–0	UEFA Women's Euro 2005 qualifying
33.	10 November 2004	Reykjavík, Iceland	Iceland	2–0	7–2	UEFA Women's Euro 2005 qualifying
34.	13 November 2004	Oslo, Norway	Iceland	1–0	2–1	UEFA Women's Euro 2005 qualifying
35.	13 November 2004	Oslo, Norway	Iceland	2–1	2–1	UEFA Women's Euro 2005 qualifying
36.	12 June 2005	Preston, England	Italy	4–1	5–3	UEFA Women's Euro 2005
37.	19 June 2005	Blackburn, England	Germany	1–2	1–3	UEFA Women's Euro 2005
38.	27 August 2005	Lillestrøm, Norway	Ukraine	1–0	4–1	2007 FIFA Women's World Cup qualification
39.	27 August 2005	Lillestrøm, Norway	Ukraine	3–1	4–1	2007 FIFA Women's World Cup qualification
