= Carolina Courage =

- Logo created by artist Michael Doret
- Full name: Carolina Courage
- Nickname: Courage
- Founded: 2001
- Stadium: SAS Stadium, Cary, North Carolina
- Capacity: 7,130
- Owner: Time Warner Cable
- League: Women's United Soccer Association

The Carolina Courage was a professional soccer team that played in the Women's United Soccer Association. The team played at Fetzer Field on the UNC-Chapel Hill campus in 2001, and then at the soccer-specific SAS Stadium in Cary, North Carolina in 2002 and 2003.

== History ==
The team was founded in 2000 and began play in 2001. The Courage played their first season at Fetzer Field on the University of North Carolina at Chapel Hill campus. They finished the 2001 season in last place, tied with the Washington Freedom on points, with a 6–12–3 record. The Courage moved to the new SAS Soccer Park in Cary for the 2002 season and drew an average of 5,800 spectators to its matches. The team won the 2002 Founders Cup, defeating the Washington Freedom 3–2. In 2003, the Carolina Courage finished 7th in the league with seven wins, nine losses, and four ties.

The Women's United Soccer Association announced on September 15, 2003, that it was suspending operations. The Courage name was revived in 2017 by the North Carolina Courage, a new team in the National Women's Soccer League that plays at the same stadium in Cary.

== See also ==
- Women's professional sports
- List of soccer clubs in the United States
- Women's association football
