= Boston Breakers (WUSA) =

- Boston Breakers
- Full name: Boston Breakers
- Nickname: Breakers
- Founded: 2000
- Dissolved: 2003
- Stadium: Nickerson Field, Boston, Massachusetts
- Capacity: 10,412
- Owner: Amos Hostetter, Jr.
- Chairman: Joe Cummings
- Manager: Pia Sundhage
- League: Women's United Soccer Association

The Boston Breakers were a professional soccer team that played in the Women's United Soccer Association. The team played at Nickerson Field on the campus of Boston University in Boston, Massachusetts.

== History ==
The Boston Breakers began play in 2001. The team held a "name the team" contest that fifteen-year-old Laura DeDonato of Easton, Massachusetts won with the name "Boston Breakers."

In the final season in the WUSA, the Breakers had their best record (10–4–7) and placed first in the regular season before losing to the Washington Freedom in the semifinals.

== Awards ==
The Breakers won the Community Service Award and held league-leading attendance in 2002. Honors received in 2003 included:

- Maren Meinert - WUSA MVP
- Maren Meinert - All Star Game MVP
- Maren Meinert, Dagny Mellgren, Kristine Lilly - All-WUSA, 1st Team
- Angela Hucles, Kate Sobrero, Karina LeBlanc - All-WUSA, 2nd Team
- Joe Cummings - Executive of the Year
- Pia Sundhage - Coach of the Year

== League suspension ==
The Women's United Soccer Association announced on September 15, 2003, that it was suspending operations.

In 2007, the Boston Breakers were re-established in the Women's Professional Soccer (WPS). After the WPS folded in 2012, the Boston Breakers joined the inaugural WPSL Elite.

== Players ==
2003 Roster

Note: Flags indicate national team as defined under FIFA eligibility rules; some limited exceptions apply. Players may hold more than one non-FIFA nationality.

No.	Pos.	Nation	Player
1	GK	USA	Tracy Ducar
2	DF	USA	Sarah Popper
3	DF	USA	Devvyn Hawkins
4	MF	USA	Rebekah Splaine
5	DF	USA	Jena Kluegel
6	FW	GER	Maren Meinert
7	DF	MEX	Mónica González
8	MF	USA	Erin O'Grady
9	FW	NOR	Ragnhild Gulbrandsen
11	MF	USA	Angela Hucles

No.	Pos.	Nation	Player
12	DF	USA	Heather Aldama
13	MF	USA	Kristine Lilly
14	FW	NOR	Dagny Mellgren
15	DF	USA	Kate Sobrero
16	DF	USA	Chrisy McCann
18	GK	USA	Kristin Slater
19	MF	USA	Mary-Frances Monroe
20	MF	USA	Rebekah McDowell
22	MF	FRA	Stéphanie Mugneret-Béghé
23	GK	CAN	Karina LeBlanc

- Coach: Pia Sundhage

== Year-by-Year Regular Season Record ==
Year	Division	League	Reg. Season	Playoffs
2001	1	WUSA	6th	did not qualify
2002	1	WUSA	6th	did not qualify
2003	1	WUSA	1st	Semi Finals

Year	W	L	T	Pts	GF	GA	Home	Away
2001	8	10	3	27	29	35	4-6-1	4-4-2
2002	6	8	7	25	36	34	5-0-5	1-8-2
2003	10	4	7	37	33	29	5-2-4	5-2-3

== See also ==
- Boston Breakers
- Women's professional sports
- List of soccer clubs in the United States
- Women's association football
