= Women's United Soccer Association =

2000–2003 American professional league

Women's United Soccer Association (WUSA)
- Founded: 2000
- Folded: 2003
- Country: United States
- Confederation: CONCACAF (North America)
- Number of clubs: 8
- Level on pyramid: 1
- Domestic cup: Founders Cup
- Last champions: Washington Freedom (1st title)
- Most championships: Bay Area CyberRays; Carolina Courage; Washington Freedom (1 title each)
- Broadcasters: Turner Sports, PAX, ESPN2

The Women's United Soccer Association (WUSA) was the world's first women's soccer league in which all the players were paid as professionals. Founded in February 2000, the league began its first season in April 2001 with eight teams in the United States. The league suspended operations on September 15, 2003, shortly after the end of its third season, after making cumulative losses of around US$100 million.

== History ==
=== Establishment ===
The 1999 FIFA Women's World Cup was hosted in the United States and drew wide interest and large crowds, including over 90,000 spectators at the final match. The U.S. women's national team won the tournament and sparked further interest in women's soccer domestically, which had lacked a professional league. Feeding on the momentum of their victory, the twenty U.S. players, in partnership with John Hendricks of the Discovery Channel, sought out the investors, markets, and players necessary to form an eight-team league. The twenty founding players were Michelle Akers, Brandi Chastain, Tracy Ducar, Lorrie Fair, Joy Fawcett, Danielle Fotopoulos, Julie Foudy, Mia Hamm, Kristine Lilly, Shannon MacMillan, Tiffeny Milbrett, Carla Overbeck, Cindy Parlow, Christie Pearce, Tiffany Roberts, Briana Scurry, Kate (Markgraf) Sobrero, Tisha Venturini, Saskia Webber, and Sara Whalen.

Initial investment in the league was provided by the following:

- Time Warner Cable, $5 million
- Cox Enterprises, $5 million
- Cox Communications, $5 million
- Amos Hostetter Jr., $5 million
- Comcast Corporation, $5 million
- John Hendricks and Comcast Corporation, $2.5 million each
- Amos Hostetter Jr. and John Hendricks, $2.5 million each

The U.S. Soccer Federation approved membership of the league as a sanctioned Division 1 women's professional soccer league on August 18, 2000. Tony DiCicco was made commissioner. The league was the first major professional league for women's soccer globally and attracted talent from outside the United States. WUSA's launch was delayed by the 2000 Summer Olympics, which required players to travel and train for an extensive period of time.

== Media coverage ==
At various times, games were televised on TNT, CNNSI, ESPN2, PAX TV, and various local and regional sports channels via Comcast, Cox, Fox, AT&T, and MSG.

=== TNT and CNN/SI (2001) ===
TNT broadcast the first WUSA game on April 14, 2001, which was contested between the Washington Freedom and San Jose CyberRays at RFK Stadium in Washington D.C.. Former U.S. national team member Wendy Gebauer Palladino helped called the game alongside play-by-play broadcaster JP Dellacamera. About 22 games were scheduled to be broadcast nationally on TNT or CNN/SI in 2001. 15 games were initially expected to be shown on TNT and seven games on CNN/SI over the course of June to August. The deal included broadcast of both semifinal matches along with the championship game, known as the Founders Cup, on TNT. During a four-year span, TNT and CNN/SI were scheduled to televise at least 88 games under a $3 million TV contract.

Ratings were not available for CNN/SI for the 2001 season as the cable TV provider did not reach enough households to be a statistical factor.

=== Pax (2002–2003) ===
After the 2001 season, the WUSA opted out of its four-year agreement to go with a two-year pact with the Pax network. The WUSA's reasoning that Pax's offer for a 4 p.m. Saturday timeslot was more desirable than the noon timeslot that TNT offered.

The change from TNT and CNN/SI to Pax however, may have immediately depressed ratings by confusing fans. To be more specific, the WUSA's ratings plunged from the 0.4 to 0.2 average it got on TNT to a 0.1 average on Pax. In other words, where as an average of 425,000 households tuned in to watch the games on TNT, fewer than 100,000 watched them on Pax. Keep in mind that Pax was a station available in 90 million, 5 million more than TNT. The move to Pax also came as AOL Time Warner considered morphing CNN/SI into a basketball channel that would be co-owned with the National Basketball Association.

Pax's coverage in itself, concerned the broadcast of the WUSA Game of the Week, on 19 consecutive Saturdays beginning in April at 4:00 p.m. (ET). In 2003, the league wouldn't decide on the opponents for the final Pax Game of the Week on August 9 in order to provide soccer fans with the best possible matchup with playoff implications. The decision on the two opponents for the August 9 game would be made in early August. In total, Pax was scheduled to televise 18 regular season games and one WUSA Playoff Semifinal in the second week of August.

Pax would receive certain cross-promotional opportunities with the league, including signs at each team venue, although the WUSA would handle ad sales for the games. The agreement carried a reported value of $2 million.

=== ESPN2 (2003) ===
For the WUSA's third and final season, they announced that ESPN2 would join Pax in broadcasting 23 league games in 2003. This would begin with a rematch of Founders Cup II with the Washington Freedom visit the Carolina Courage on April 5. ESPN2 was scheduled to broadcast only four of the 23 nationally televised games. This included the All-Star Game on June 19 and the Founders Cup on August 24. Beth Mowins and Anson Dorrance handled WUSA games on not just Pax but ESPN2 also.

The WUSA ultimately scored a 0.1 percent rating on Pax and 0.2 percent on ESPN2.

== Teams ==
The WUSA franchises were located in Philadelphia; Boston; New York City; Washington, D.C.; Cary, N.C.; Atlanta; San Jose, Ca.; and San Diego:

Team	Stadium	City	Founded	Joined WUSA	Left	Notes
Atlanta Beat	Bobby Dodd Stadium	Atlanta, Georgia	2000	2001	2003	Dissolved with league
Boston Breakers	Nickerson Field	Boston, Massachusetts	2000	2001	2003	Dissolved with league
Carolina Courage (Note: Originally intended to be in Orlando, Florida, and were going to be called the Orlando Tempest)	SAS Stadium	Cary, North Carolina	2000	2001	2003	Dissolved with league
New York Power	Mitchel Athletic Complex	Uniondale, New York	2000	2001	2003	Dissolved with league
Philadelphia Charge	Villanova Stadium	Villanova, Pennsylvania	2000	2001	2003	Dissolved with league
San Diego Spirit	Torero Stadium	San Diego, California	2000	2001	2003	Dissolved with league
San Jose CyberRays (Note: Originally called the Bay Area CyberRays)	Spartan Stadium	San Jose, California	2000	2001	2003	Dissolved with league
Washington Freedom	RFK Stadium	Washington, DC	2000	2001	2003	Hiatus, resumed with USL W-League in 2006

Locations of the teams

For the inaugural season, each roster primarily consisted of players from the United States, although up to four international players were allowed on each team's roster. Among the international players were China's Sun Wen, Pu Wei, Fan Yunjie, Zhang Ouying, Gao Hong, Zhao Lihong, and Bai Jie; Germany's Birgit Prinz, Conny Pohlers, Steffi Jones and Maren Meinert; Norway's Hege Riise, Unni Lehn, and Dagny Mellgren; Brazil's Sissi, Kátia and Pretinha; and Canada's Charmaine Hooper, Sharolta Nonen, and Christine Latham.

The league also hosted singular talents from nations which were not then at the forefront of women's soccer, such as Maribel Dominguez of Mexico, Homare Sawa of Japan, Julie Fleeting of Scotland, Cheryl Salisbury of Australia, Marinette Pichon of France, and Kelly Smith of England.

== WUSA Awards ==
=== Founders Cup champions ===
The Founders Cup (named in honor of the 20 founding players) was awarded to the winner of a four-team, single-elimination postseason playoff.

Season	Champion	Score	Runner-up	City
2001	Bay Area CyberRays	3–3 asdet 4–2 pen	Atlanta Beat	Foxboro, MA
2002	Carolina Courage	3–2	Washington Freedom	Atlanta, GA
2003	Washington Freedom	2–1 asdet	Atlanta Beat	San Diego, CA

The abbreviation "asdet" stands for "after sudden death extra time". WUSA's sudden death overtime was 15 minutes long (two 7½-minute periods) and used only in the playoffs.

== League suspension ==
The WUSA played for three full seasons, suspending operations on September 15, 2003, shortly after the conclusion of the third season. Neither television ratings nor attendance met forecasts, while the league spent its initial $40 million budget, planned to last five years, by the end of the first season. Even though the players took salary cuts of up to 30% for the final season, with the founding players (who also held a participating interest in the league) taking the largest cuts, that was not enough to bring expenses under control. In the hopes of an eventual relaunch of the league, all rights to team names, logos, and similar properties were preserved. Efforts to line up new sources of capital and operating funds continued. In June 2004, the WUSA held two "WUSA Festivals" in Los Angeles and Blaine, Minnesota, featuring matches between reconstituted WUSA teams (often with marquee players borrowed from other teams), in order to maintain the league in the public eye and sustain interest in women's professional soccer.

With the WUSA on hiatus, the Women's Premier Soccer League (WPSL) and the W-League regained their status as the premier women's soccer leagues in the United States, and many former WUSA players joined those teams.

A new women's professional soccer league in the United States called Women's Professional Soccer started in 2009. However, that league suspended operations in January 2012. It was succeeded by the National Women's Soccer League which continues to this day.

== See also ==
- List of WUSA drafts
- Women's Professional Soccer
- National Women's Soccer League
- Women's sports

Preceded by First	Division 1 soccer league in the United States; 2000–2003	Succeeded by Women's Professional Soccer
