= 2001 WUSA Founders Cup =

Championship match of Women's United Soccer Association

- Match program cover
- Event: 2001 WUSA season
Bay Area CyberRays	Atlanta Beat
3	3
- CyberRays won 4–2 on penalties
- Date: August 25, 2001
- Venue: Foxboro Stadium, Foxborough, Massachusetts
- Player of the Match: Julie Murray (CyberRays)
- Referee: Sandra Hunt
- Attendance: 21,078
- Weather: Sunshine, Puffy clouds 80 °F (27 °C)

The 2001 WUSA Founders Cup, also known as Founders Cup I, was the first championship match in Women's United Soccer Association history, played between Bay Area CyberRays and the Atlanta Beat to decide the champion of the league's inaugural season. The game was played in bright sunshine at Foxboro Stadium in Foxborough, Massachusetts on August 25, 2001. Bay Area CyberRays defeated the Beat 4–2 on a penalty shootout when the match finished 3–3 after sudden death extra time.

== Pre-match ==
Ticket prices for the final started at $15 and were also available at $28 and $45, with a discount for group purchases.

Atlanta's star player Sun Wen had been afflicted by injuries to her left knee and ankle and was only fit enough to be a substitute. She had entered the semi-final victory over Philadelphia Charge to decisive effect, scoring a goal and assisting another for Cindy Parlow as Atlanta recovered from 2–0 down to win 3–2.

== Match ==
August 25, 2001
14: 00 EDT

Bay Area CyberRays	3–3 (a.e.t.)	Atlanta Beat
Chastain 6'; Murray 43'; Venturini 86'	Report	Bivens 11'; Hooper 14'; Sun Wen 83'
Penalties
Venturini (penalty scored); Dorn (penalty scored); Kátia (penalty scored); Murray (penalty scored)	4–2	(penalty missed) Sun Wen; (penalty scored) Serlenga; (penalty missed) Hooper; (penalty scored) Blalack

Foxboro Stadium,
Foxborough, Massachusetts
Attendance: 21,078
Referee: Sandra Hunt

Bay Area CyberRays	Atlanta Beat

BAY AREA CYBERRAYS:
GK	1	(United States) LaKeysia Beene
DF	6	(United States) Brandi Chastain (c)
DF	5	(United States) Kelly Lindsey
DF	2	(United States) Thori Bryan
DF	17	(Mexico) Gina Oceguera	(yellow card) 90'
MF	15	(United States) Tisha Venturini
MF	10	(Brazil) Sissi	(substituted off) 90'
MF	4	(United States) Carey Dorn
FW	7	(United States) Christina Bell	(substituted off) 66'
FW	8	(Australia) Julie Murray
FW	9	(Brazil) Kátia
Substitutes:
MF	20	(United States) Ann Cook	(substituted in) 90'
FW	18	(United States) Megan Horvath	(substituted in) 66'	(substituted off) 104'
FW	23	(United States) Jacqui Little		(substituted in) 104'
Coach:
(England) Ian Sawyers

ATLANTA BEAT:
GK	1	(United States) Briana Scurry
DF	21	(United States) Lisa Krzykowski
DF	6	(Canada) Sharolta Nonen
DF	17	(United States) Dayna Smith	(yellow card) 41'
DF	25	(United States) Nancy Augustyniak
MF	8	(Japan) Homare Sawa	(substituted off) 104'
MF	5	(United States) Nikki Serlenga
MF	4	(United States) Kylie Bivens	(substituted off) 63'
MF	15	(United States) Julie Augustyniak	(substituted off) 39'
FW	12	(United States) Cindy Parlow (c)
FW	10	(Canada) Charmaine Hooper
Substitutes:
MF	23	(Canada) Amy Walsh	(substituted in) 39'
FW	9	(China) Sun Wen	(substituted in) 63'
FW	22	(United States) Bryn Blalack	(substituted in) 104'
Coach:
(United States) Tom Stone

Player of the match

- Julie Murray (Bay Area CyberRays)

Match officials

- Assistant referees:
  - Jon Wilson
  - Sharon Wheeler
- Fourth official: Peter Kokolski

Match rules

- 90 minutes.
- 15 minutes of golden goal extra-time if necessary.
- Penalty shoot-out if scores still level.
- Three named substitutes.
- Maximum of three substitutions.

=== Statistics ===
	Bay Area CyberRays	Atlanta Beat
Total shots	13	8
Shots on target	9	7
Corner kicks	8	10
Fouls committed	17	14
Offsides	2	1
Yellow cards	1	1
Red cards	0	0
