= 2001 WUSA waiver draft =

The WUSA waiver draft, held before Women's United Soccer Association's initial 2001 season, distributed up to four additional players to the league's eight inaugural teams.

The draft occurred on March 20, 2001. This took place after each team had already been allocated three national team players, two foreign players, had each made 15 selections from the main draft held on December 10 and 11, 2000, and four selections from the supplemental draft for recent graduates and late entrants to the draft pool.

== Round 1 ==
Pick	Player	Pos.	New WUSA team	Previous WUSA team
1	Amber Reynolds	DF	Bay Area CyberRays	Bay Area CyberRays

== Round 2 ==
Pick	Player	Pos.	New WUSA team	Previous WUSA team
1	Danielle Dion	GK	Philadelphia Charge	Boston Breakers
2	Stephanie Loehr	DF	New York Power	Washington Freedom
3	Janine Szpara	GK	Bay Area CyberRays	Bay Area CyberRays

== Round 3 ==
Pick	Player	Pos.	New WUSA team	Previous WUSA team
1	Laurie Pells	GK	Bay Area CyberRays	Philadelphia Charge
2	Beth Keller	FW	Carolina Courage	Philadelphia Charge
3	Nicole Williams	GK	New York Power	New York Power
4	Melissa Ribaudo	DF	San Diego Spirit	San Diego Spirit
5	Erica Iverson	DF	Philadelphia Charge	New York Power

== Round 4 ==
Pick	Player	Pos.	New WUSA team	Previous WUSA team
1	Gayle Smith	FW	Philadelphia Charge	Washington Freedom
2	Holly Broome	DF	San Diego Spirit	San Diego Spirit
3	Kara Brown	MF	New York Power	San Diego Spirit
4	Carlene Stenson	FW	Carolina Courage	New York Power
5	Kelly Wilson	FW	Bay Area CyberRays	Bay Area CyberRays

== Draft notes ==
Teams were required to cut their pre-season rosters to a maximum of 24 players by March 18, 2001 (with an additional slot for one injured player). Only teams with fewer than 24 players could participate in this draft, to bring their roster back up to the 24-player cap for training camps from 22 to 31 March, after which a final cut to 20-player rosters (with three additional reserve players) would be made. Washington Freedom coach Jim Gabarra declined to take part.

=== Team-by-team ===
==== Atlanta Beat ====
On 18 March Atlanta waived Bryn Blalack, Kim Engesser, Melissa Roth, Wynne McIntosh and Abby Gillard. They still had 24 players on their roster, so were unable to participate in this draft.

==== Bay Area CyberRays ====
Bay Area waived Amber Reynolds, Janine Szpara, Tami Pivnick, Lindsay Nohl, Christina Harsaghy, Kelly Wilson and Iliana Moskoff. This reduced their roster to 20 players, making them the only team allowed to participate in all four rounds of this draft. They used three of the four picks to reclaim players they had released two days earlier.

==== Boston Breakers ====
Boston waived Ashley Berman, Holly Pierce, Danielle Dion, and Ally Wagner, but still had a 24-player roster and were therefore unable to participate in this draft.

==== Carolina Courage ====
Carolina had waived Kelly Berrall, Tracy Grose, Ásthildur Helgadóttir, Megan Jeidy, Jessica Post, Staci Reynolds and Erica Westrich. With 22 remaining players they were permitted two picks in this draft.

==== New York Power ====
New York waived Becky Hornbacher, Nicole Williams, Melissa McBean, Carlene Stenson, Erica Iverson, Jessica Larsen and Vanessa Rubio. With 21 players they were permitted to take three more in this draft.

==== San Diego Spirit ====
After waiving Holly Broome, Erica Strey, Kara Brown, Michelle Maitland, Melissa Ribaudo and Sara Streufert, San Diego had 22 players. They participated in two rounds of this draft, which they used to bring back Ribaudo and Broome.

==== Philadelphia Charge ====
Philadelphia waived Laurie Pells, Angela Harrison, Tracey Spinelli, Beth Keller and Courtney Saunders. They had 20 players going into the draft but since Laurie Hill had retired rather than been waived they officially had 21 and could only participate in three rounds.

==== Washington Freedom ====
Washington Waived Stephanie Loehr, Robin McCullough, Rikki-Ann Serrins and Tanya Vogel. They had 23 players but decided not to use their permitted one pick in this draft.

== See also ==
- List of top-division football clubs in CONCACAF countries
- List of professional sports teams in the United States and Canada
- List of WUSA drafts
- 2001 WUSA season
