= 2000 WUSA player allocation =

The 200 WUSA player allocation distributed 24 players from the United States women's national soccer team to the eight founding teams of the WUSA. The initial allocation list was announced on May 24, 2000, and consisted primarily of players from the American team that won the 1999 FIFA Women's World Cup the previous year.

== Process ==
The league allocated three players from the list of founding players based on three criteria:

- player's interest in playing for a particular team
- player's hometown or college town
- competitive balance amongst the teams

== 2000 allocation results ==
| | Atlanta Beat | Boston Breakers | New York Power | Orlando Tempest | Philadelphia Charge | San Diego Spirit | Bay Area CyberRays | Washington Freedom |
| (United States) | Briana Scurry | Kristine Lilly | Tiffeny Milbrett | Michelle Akers^{1} | Lorrie Fair | Julie Foudy | Brandi Chastain | Mia Hamm |
| (United States) | Cindy Parlow | Kate Sobrero | Sara Whalen | Danielle Fotopoulos | Saskia Webber | Joy Fawcett | Tisha Venturini | Siri Mullinix |
| (United States) | Nikki Serlenga | Tracy Ducar | Christie Pearce | Tiffany Roberts | Mandy Clemens | Shannon MacMillan | LaKeysia Beene | Michelle French |

^{1} A shoulder injury ruled Akers out of the season, so she took on a spokesperson role for WUSA while hoping to return to playing the following season. When the Orlando franchise moved to Carolina, Carla Overbeck—who had intended to sit out 2001 in order to have another child—agreed to replace Akers as one of the team's allocated players.

== See also ==
- List of top-division football clubs in CONCACAF countries
- List of professional sports teams in the United States and Canada
- List of WUSA drafts
- 2001 WUSA season
