= Cindy Parlow Cone =

American sports executive (born 1978)

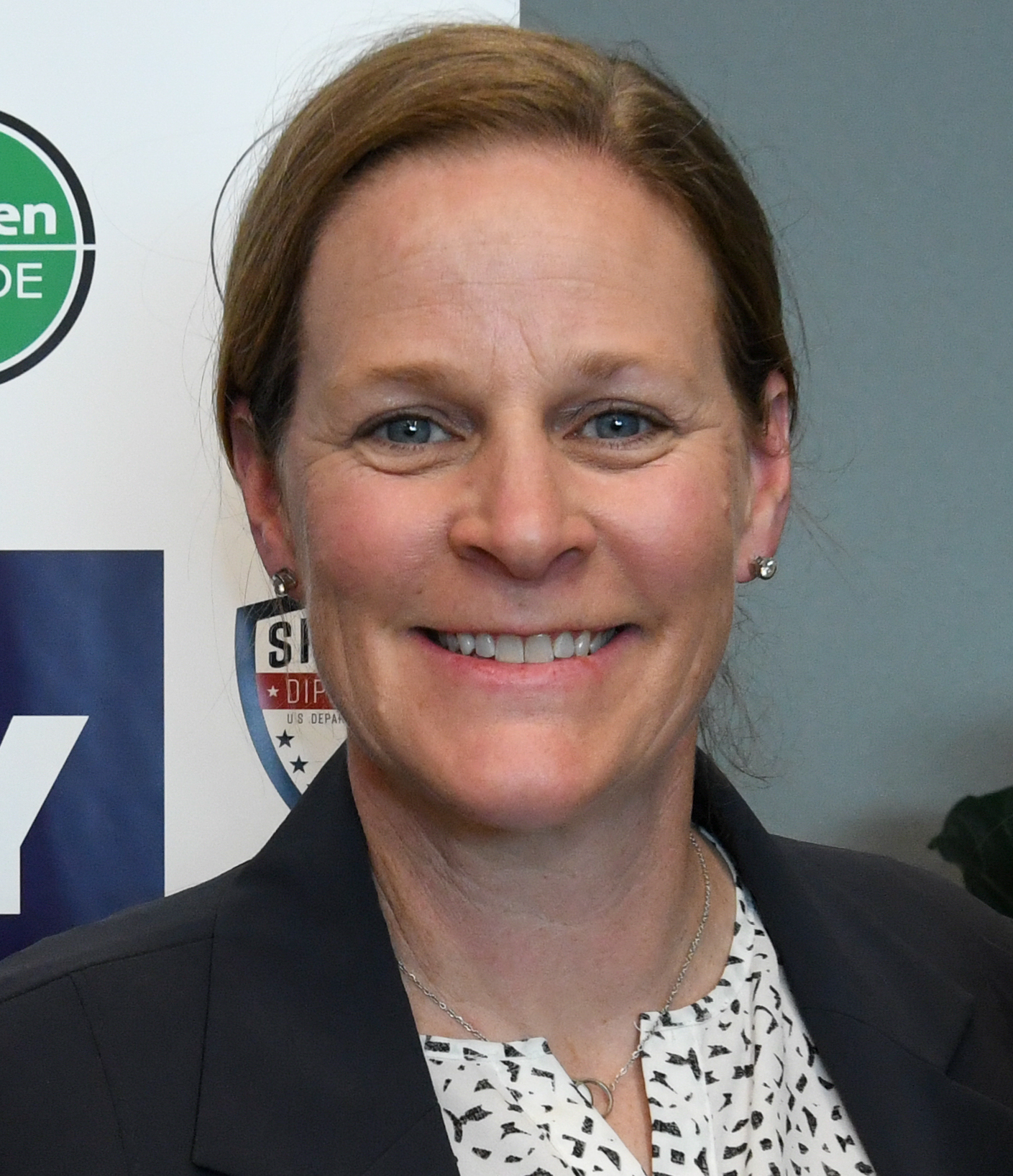
- Parlow in 2023

Personal information
- Full name: Cynthia Marie Parlow Cone
- Birth name: Cynthia Marie Parlow
- Date of birth: May 8, 1978 (age 48)
- Place of birth: Memphis, Tennessee, U.S.
- Height: 5 ft 11 in (1.80 m)
- Position: Midfielder

College career
Years	Team	Apps	(Gls)
1995–1998	North Carolina Tar Heels	103	(68)

Senior career*
Years	Team	Apps	(Gls)
1999	Raleigh Wings		
2001–2003	Atlanta Beat	60	(15)

International career
1996–2004	United States	158	(75)

Managerial career
- 2007–2012: North Carolina Tar Heels (assistant)
- 2013: Portland Thorns FC
Medal record
Women's soccer
Representing United States
Olympic Games
Gold medal – first place	1996 Atlanta	Team competition
Gold medal – first place	2004 Athens	Team competition
Silver medal – second place	2000 Sydney	Team competition
FIFA Women's World Cup
Gold medal – first place	1999 USA	Team competition
Bronze medal – third place	2003 USA	Team competition
President of the United States Soccer Federation
Incumbent
Assumed office March 12, 2020
Preceded by	Carlos Cordeiro
Vice President of United States Soccer Federation
In office February 16, 2019 – March 12, 2020
Preceded by	Carlos Cordeiro
Succeeded by	Bill Taylor
- * Club domestic league appearances and goals

Cynthia Marie Parlow Cone (née Parlow; born May 8, 1978) is an American soccer executive and president of the United States Soccer Federation. A former professional soccer player, she is a two-time Olympic Gold medalist and 1999 FIFA Women's World Cup champion. As head coach in 2013, Parlow Cone led the Portland Thorns FC to clinch the inaugural National Women's Soccer League (NWSL) championship title.

Parlow Cone previously served on U.S. Soccer's Referee Committee, Medical Advisory Committee, Appeals Committee, the Athletes’ Council, and Youth Task Force. She was elected as interim vice president of U.S. Soccer on February 16, 2019, and re-elected for a four-year term in February 2020. In March 2020, she was named president after the previous holder, Carlos Cordeiro, suddenly resigned. In February 2022, she was elected to a full four-year term in her own right. In 2025, Parlow Cone was elected to the FIFA Council at Concacaf's 40th Ordinary Congress.

Parlow Cone was inducted into the National Soccer Hall of Fame in 2018, the Tennessee State Soccer Association Hall of Fame in 2019, and the Memphis Sports Hall of Fame the same year.

== Early life ==
Born to Larry and Josephine Parlow, Cindy was raised in Memphis, Tennessee, where she attended Germantown High School. At age 13, she attended a local autograph signing by U.S. national team head coach Anson Dorrance after the U.S. won the inaugural 1991 FIFA Women's World Cup in China. After the signing, she told her mother, "I'm going to play for that man some day." Four years later, she decided to graduate high school early and attend the University of North Carolina at Chapel Hill where she played for the Tar Heels women's soccer team led by Dorrance. She later noted, "I wasn’t really your typical teenager; I was very intense and very focused. I definitely wasn’t an adult when I was 17, but I felt like coming to UNC was a great decision for me in all aspects because I felt like I was fully supported and pushed to become not only a better soccer player but a better person."

=== University of North Carolina Tar Heels: 1995–98 ===
External videos
- Cindy Parlow Cone Finds Out She's Been Elected to the National Soccer Hall of Fame, from National Soccer Hall of Fame, Retrieved March 23, 2020.

At Chapel Hill, Parlow was a four-time All-American and helped the team win the NCAA Women's Soccer Championship three times and the Atlantic Coast Conference regular season four times. She was a two-time Hermann Trophy winner in 1997 and 1998 (the second two-time winner following Mia Hamm). She was named the ACC Athlete of the Year in 1999.

Following her freshman season, Parlow was named the Atlantic Coast Conference Rookie of the Year. Her 19 goals and 13 assists (51 points) led Soccer News and Soccer America to name her National Freshman Player of the Year as well. Parlow's freshman year ended when she scored an own goal in 20th minute of the 1995 NCAA Division I Women's Soccer Tournament semifinals. Notre Dame defeated North Carolina 1-0 on Parlow's own goal to snap the Tar Heels' 35-game winning streak and denying North Carolina a 10th consecutive NCAA title. The following year, she was a finalist for the MAC Hermann Trophy after scoring 15 goals and providing 11 assists. She scored the game-winning goal in the NCAA Division 1 Championship game against Connecticut. The same year, she was named the Most Valuable Player of the ACC Tournament. Soccer News named her National Player of the Year. As a junior, she was awarded the Hermann Trophy and MAC Sports Foundation National Player of the Year Award. Soccer Times Magazine named her National Player of the Year as well.

During her senior season, Parlow scored 21 goals, including 7 game-winners, and recorded 11 assists. She was awarded the 1998 Hermann Trophy and 1998 Missouri Athletic Club Foundation Award as the National Collegiate Women's Soccer Player of the Year. Soccer News Magazine named her Player of the Year. She was awarded the Atlantic Coast Conference Player of the Year and named to the All-ACC first team for the fourth consecutive year.

Parlow ended her collegiate career with 68 goals and 53 assists (189 points). During her time at North Carolina, the team recorded a cumulative record of 102–3–1 record.

== Playing career ==
=== International ===
External videos
- 41st Most Memorable Women’s World Cup Moment: Cindy Parlow Cone’s Diving Header, from Fox Soccer, Retrieved March 22, 2020.

Parlow began training with the U.S. women's national team in March 1995. At age 17, she made her first appearance and scored two goals in a friendly against Russia on January 14, 1996. Parlow played in all six games of the team's 1999 World Cup victory, the 1996, 2000 and 2004 Olympics, as well as the 2003 FIFA Women's World Cup. At age 18, she was the youngest player to win an Olympic gold medal and FIFA Women's World Cup title.

==== 1996 Atlanta Olympics ====
Parlow was the youngest player on the American squad to compete at the 1996 Summer Olympics in Atlanta. The '96 Olympics marked the first time that women's soccer (football) was played at the international tournament. Led by head coach Tony DiCicco (the team's former goalkeeper coach at the 1991 FIFA Women's World Cup), the U.S. advanced to the semifinal after defeating Denmark and Sweden and tying with China in the group stage matches. After defeating Norway 2–1 in the semi-final, the U.S. faced China for a second time in the final. During the final in Athens, Georgia, 76,481 spectators were in the stands to watch the United States defeat China (a new world record for the most spectators to attend a women's sporting event).

==== 1999 FIFA Women's World Cup ====
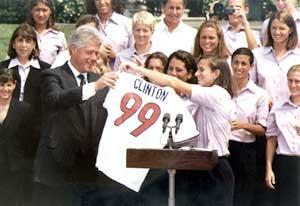
President Bill Clinton with the '99ers at the White House, July 19, 1999

Parlow played in all six games of the team's 1999 World Cup victory and scored two goals. During the July 4 semifinal match against Brazil in front of 73,123 spectators, she scored a header goal in the fifth minute of the match.

After 90 minutes of scoreless regulation time and 30 minutes of sudden death, the 1999 FIFA Women's World Cup Final was decided by a penalty shootout between the U.S. and China. The five American players to take penalty kicks converted while China missed one attempt so that the U.S. won. The final surpassed the 1996 Atlanta Olympic final as the most-attended women's sports event, with more than 90,000 people filling the Rose Bowl in Pasadena, California. It held the record until 2014 for the largest U.S. television audience for a soccer match with 17,975,000 viewers. As of July 2015, it ranks third following the 2015 FIFA Women's World Cup (25,400,000 viewers) and 2014 FIFA World Cup group stage match between the U.S. men's team and Portugal (18,220,000 viewers). A week later, the team met President Clinton at the White House and flew with Hillary and Chelsea Clinton on Air Force Two to Cape Canaveral.

==== 2000 Sydney Olympics and 100th cap ====
In August 2000, Parlow was named to the U.S. squad for the 2000 Summer Olympics in Australia by head coach April Heinrichs.

Parlow finished 2000 with 19 goals, the highest on the national team. In June, she scored a hat-trick against both New Zealand and Canada during the Pacific Cup in Australia. In August, she scored a brace against Russia during a 9–1 win.

On July 3, 2001, Parlow gained her 100th international cap in a 1-0 friendly win over Canada, making her the youngest footballer—male or female—to do so.

==== 2003 FIFA Women's World Cup ====
In August 2003, Parlow was named to the roster for the 2003 FIFA Women's World Cup by head coach April Heinrichs. During the team's group stage match against Sweden, she scored a header goal off a corner kick from Mia Hamm in the 36th minute of the U.S.' 3–1 win. The U.S. faced Nigeria in their second group stage match. After Parlow was fouled by the Nigerian captain, Hamm scored on the awarded penalty kick to open the game's scoring. Parlow scored the U.S.' second goal in the 47th minute. The U.S. eventually won 5–0. Parlow, along with fellow starters Mia Hamm, Julie Foudy and Shannon Boxx were rested during the team's final group stage match: a 3–0 win against North Korea before advancing to the quarter-finals where they faced long-time rival Norway. Parlow started the match and was subbed off for Tiffeny Milbrett in the 72nd minute of the 1–0 win. The U.S. was defeated 3-0 by Germany in the semi-finals. During the first half of third-place match against Canada, Parlow sustained a concussion and was removed from the match. The U.S. went on to win 3–1 to secure third place at the tournament.

==== 2004 Athens Olympics ====
Parlow competed at the 2004 Summer Olympics in Athens. During the Olympic qualifying tournament, she scored a hat-trick against Haiti.

On October 21, Parlow scored her seventh hat-trick for the national team, moving ahead of Michelle Akers in the record books and one fewer than Mia Hamm.

==== Retirement ====
On July 30, 2006, Parlow announced her retirement from international play, citing post-concussion syndrome. She concluded her career with 158 caps (the ninth most in United States Women's National team history) and 75 goals (fifth most).

=== Club ===
==== Raleigh Wings ====
In February 1999 Parlow signed for USL W-League club Raleigh Wings. She helped the Wings retain the W-League title, scoring against the Chicago Cobras in the championship game.

==== Atlanta Beat: 2001–03 ====
Parlow was one of the twenty founding players of the Women's United Soccer Association (WUSA), the first professional women's soccer league in the United States, and captained the Atlanta Beat. She led the team to the playoffs in each of the league's three seasons of operation (2001–2003).

During the 2001 WUSA season, Parlow's five goals ranked first on the Beat and her seven assists ranked first. During a match against the Philadelphia Charge on May 24, 2001, she scored a goal in the second minute of the match. On June 17, she scored a brace against the San Diego Spirit, including the game-winning goal to win 3–2. She earned the league's first red card during the same match after an altercation with Julie Foudy. Foudy was given a yellow card. She scored another brace on July 22 to defeat the New York Power 2–0. The league folded in September - five days before the 2003 FIFA Women's World Cup in the United States (originally slated for China, but moved due to the SARS epidemic.

Atlanta finished the regular season in first place with a 10–4–7 record securing a spot in the playoffs. During the semi-final match against the Philadelphia Charge, Parlow scored an equalizer in the 79th minute. During the second overtime period, she scored the league's first golden goal to advance the Beat to the Founders Cup championship match where they were defeated in penalty shots by the San Jose CyberRays in front of 21,078 fans at Foxboro Stadium in Boston.

During the 2002 WUSA season, Parlow scored five goals and provided four assists ranking third on the team with 14 points. After playing the first two games of the season, Parlow was forced to miss the third due to FIFA rules and national team commitments. She scored a goal against the Boston Breakers despite playing with a broken nose suffered in the fifth minute of the game. Playing against the New York Power on June 9, she scored a goal and recorded an assist to Charmaine Hooper lifting the team to a 2–0 win. The Beat finished the regular season in fourth place with a 11–9d=1 record and advanced to the Playoffs. They were defeated 2-1 by the Carolina Courage in the semi-finals.

Parlow returned to the Beat for the 2003 WUSA season. On June 23, she scored a hat-trick against the Philadelphia Charge ending a three-game winless streak. The Beat finished in second place with a 9–4–8 record two points behind Boston. They defeated the San Diego Spirit during the semifinals and advanced for the second time to the WUSA Founders Cup where they faced the Washington Freedom led by Mia Hamm and Abby Wambach. The Freedom won 2–1.

== International goals ==
No.	Date	Venue	Opponent	Score	Result	Competition
1.	14 January 1996	Campinas, Brazil	Russia	3–?	8–1	Friendly
2.	14 January 1996	Campinas, Brazil	Russia	5–?	8–1	Friendly
3.	17 February 1996	Houston, United States	Sweden	3–0	3–0	Friendly
4.	14 March 1996	Decatur, United States	Germany	2–0	6–0	Friendly
5.	26 April 1996	St. Louis, United States	France	3–1	4–1	Friendly
6.	26 April 1996	St. Louis, United States	France	4–1	4–1	Friendly
7.	12 May 1996	Worcester, United States	Canada	5–0	6–0	1996 Women's U.S. Cup
8.	4 July 1996	Tampa, United States	Australia	2–?	2–1	Friendly
9.	28 February 1997	Melbourne, Australia	Australia	1–0	4–0	Friendly
10.	11 May 1997	Portland, United States	England	2–0	6–0	Friendly
11.	11 May 1997	Portland, United States	England	4–0	6–0	Friendly
12.	5 June 1997	Ambler, United States	Australia	2–0	9–1	1997 Women's U.S. Cup
13.	5 June 1997	Ambler, United States	Australia	6–0	9–1	1997 Women's U.S. Cup
14.	8 June 1997	Washington, D.C., United States	Italy	1–0	2–0	1997 Women's U.S. Cup
15.	24 January 1998	Guangzhou, China	Norway	3–0	3–0	1998 Four Nations Tournament
16.	30 May 1998	Washington, D.C., United States	New Zealand	1–0	5–0	Friendly
17.	25 June 1998	St. Louis, United States	Germany	1–1	1–1	Friendly
18.	16 March 1999	Quarteira, Portugal	Finland	2–0	4–0	1999 Algarve Cup
19.	29 April 1999	Charlotte, United States	Japan	3–0	9–0	Friendly
20.	13 May 1999	Milwaukee, United States	Netherlands	2–0	5–0	Friendly
21.	3 June 1999	Beaverton, United States	Australia	2–0	4–0	Friendly
22.	6 June 1999	Portland, United States	Canada	4–2	4–2	Friendly
23.	24 June 1999	Chicago, United States	Nigeria	6–1	7–1	1999 FIFA Women's World Cup
24.	4 July 1999	Stanford, United States	Brazil	1–0	2–0	1999 FIFA Women's World Cup
25.	3 October 1999	Columbus, United States	South Korea	1–0	5–0	1999 Women's U.S. Cup
26.	12 March 2000	Albufeira, Portugal	Portugal	1–0	7–0	2000 Algarve Cup
27.	12 March 2000	Albufeira, Portugal	Portugal	3–0	7–0	2000 Algarve Cup
28.	12 March 2000	Albufeira, Portugal	Portugal	5–0	7–0	2000 Algarve Cup
29.	7 May 2000	Portland, United States	Canada	2–0	4–0	2000 Women's U.S. Cup
30.	2 June 2000	Sydney, Australia	Canada	3–0	9–1	2000 Pacific Cup
31.	2 June 2000	Sydney, Australia	Canada	8–0	9–1	2000 Pacific Cup
32.	2 June 2000	Sydney, Australia	Canada	9–0		2000 Pacific Cup
33.	4 June 2000	Sydney, Australia	New Zealand	3–0	5–0	2000 Pacific Cup
34.	4 June 2000	Sydney, Australia	New Zealand	4–0	5–0	2000 Pacific Cup
35.	4 June 2000	Sydney, Australia	New Zealand	5–0	5–0	2000 Pacific Cup
36.	8 June 2000	Newcastle, Australia	Japan	1–0	4–1	2000 Pacific Cup
37.	23 June 2000	Hershey, United States	Trinidad and Tobago	1–0	11–0	2000 CONCACAF Women's Gold Cup
38.	23 June 2000	Hershey, United States	Trinidad and Tobago	6–0	11–0	2000 CONCACAF Women's Gold Cup
39.	23 June 2000	Hershey, United States	Trinidad and Tobago	9–0	11–0	2000 CONCACAF Women's Gold Cup
40.	30 July 2000	Oslo, Norway	Norway	1–2	1–2	Friendly
41.	13 August 2000	Annapolis, United States	Russia	5–1	7–1	Friendly
42.	13 August 2000	Annapolis, United States	Russia	7–1	7–1	Friendly
43.	10 December 2000	Houston, United States	Mexico	2–2	3–2	Friendly
44.	10 December 2000	Houston, United States	Mexico	3–2	3–2	Friendly
45.	9 September 2001	Chicago, United States	Germany	1–0	4–1	2001 Women's U.S. Cup
46.	21 July 2002	Blaine, United States	Norway	1–0	4–0	Friendly
47.	21 July 2002	Blaine, United States	Norway	3–0	4–0	Friendly
48.	8 September 2002	Columbus, United States	Scotland	1–0	8–2	Friendly
49.	29 September 2002	Uniondale, United States	Russia	2–0	5–1	2002 Women's U.S. Cup
50.	2 October 2002	Cary, United States	Australia	2–0	4–0	2002 Women's U.S. Cup
51.	2 October 2002	Cary, United States	Australia	3–0	4–0	2002 Women's U.S. Cup
52.	27 October 2002	Pasadena, United States	Mexico	2–0	3–0	2002 CONCACAF Women's Gold Cup
53.	29 October 2002	Fullerton, United States	Trinidad and Tobago	1–0	3–0	2002 CONCACAF Women's Gold Cup
54.	6 November 2002	Seattle, United States	Costa Rica	1–0	7–0	2002 CONCACAF Women's Gold Cup
55.	6 November 2002	Seattle, United States	Costa Rica	2–0	7–0	2002 CONCACAF Women's Gold Cup
56.	6 November 2002	Seattle, United States	Costa Rica	3–0	7–0	2002 CONCACAF Women's Gold Cup
22.	21 September 2003	Washington, D.C., United States	Sweden	2–0	3–1	2003 FIFA Women's World Cup
23.	25 September 2003	Philadelphia, United States	Nigeria	3–0	5–0	2003 FIFA Women's World Cup
24.	27 February 2004	Heredia, Costa Rica	Haiti	2–0	8–0	2004 CONCACAF Women's Pre-Olympic Tournament
25.	27 February 2004	Heredia, Costa Rica	Haiti	6–0	8–0	2004 CONCACAF Women's Pre-Olympic Tournament
26.	27 February 2004	Heredia, Costa Rica	Haiti	8–0	8–0	2004 CONCACAF Women's Pre-Olympic Tournament

== Coaching career ==
=== North Carolina Tar Heels, 2007–2012 ===
Parlow Cone was an assistant coach for the North Carolina Tar Heels from 2007 to 2012. In 2012, she led practices while head coach Anson Dorrance spent time with his wife who was ill. He noted, "I had no issue telling the world she was my secret weapon." She was also the director of coaching for under-15 to under-18 girls' soccer at Triangle United, a youth soccer club in Chapel Hill, for six years until 2012.

=== Portland Thorns FC, 2013 ===
In December 2012, Parlow Cone was hired as the head coach for Portland Thorns FC ahead of the inaugural season of the National Women's Soccer League (NWSL). She became the first head coach to win an NWSL Championship, as Thorns FC beat Western New York Flash 2–0 in the first ever championship game August 31, 2013. She resigned as head coach on December 5, 2013, citing personal reasons, particularly the desire of her and her husband, Portland Timbers director of sports science John Cone (who also resigned around the same time), to be together more.

Parlow Cone served on the coaching staff for the under-14 and under-15 girls’ national teams from 2010 to 2013. In 2015, she coached at the Berkshire Soccer Academy for Girls along with her former teammates Mia Hamm, Kristine Lilly, Tisha Venturini, and Brandi Chastain. In 2019, she became a director of coaching for NCFC Youth, the youth division of North Carolina FC.

== Sports executive career ==
Parlow Cone served on U.S. Soccer's Referee Committee, Medical Advisory Committee, Appeals Committee, the Athletes’ Council, and Youth Task Force. She was elected as Vice President of U.S. Soccer on February 16, 2019, filling the vacancy created when Carlos Cordeiro became president in February 2018. She was re-elected Vice President in February 2020 for a full four-year term.

In early March 2020, Parlow Cone was named President of U.S. Soccer after Carlos Cordeiro suddenly resigned after a growing outcry from players, board members, supporters and sponsors over assertions made in court documents. One of her first acts as president was to apologize for a recent legal brief and "offensive assertions made by the Federation that do not represent our core values." Running unopposed, she was re-elected President in February 2021 to finish the final year of Cordeiro's term. On March 5, 2022, she was re-elected as president for a new four-year term, defeating Cordeiro in a weighted vote 52.9-47.1%.

== In popular culture ==
Following the success of the 1999 FIFA Women's World Cup, Parlow and her teammates were featured on the cover of Sports Illustrated as the Sportswomen of the Year. In 2005, she was featured in the film, Dare to Dream: The Story of the U.S. Women's Soccer Team. In 2008, she was featured in Winning Isn't Everything, The Untold Story of a Soccer Dynasty, a documentary film about the success of the Tar Heels women's soccer program and its players. In 2013, she was featured in the ESPN series, Nine for IX: The '99ers. In 2015, she was featured in HBO's Real Sports.

== Other work ==
In 2015, Parlow Cone worked with the U.S. Department of State's Empowering Women and Girls through Sports Initiative to work with Jordanian under-17 national soccer team during a 10-day exchange program. She has been a leader in raising awareness about concussion safety. In December 2018, she was a presenter at the Draw for the 2019 FIFA Women's World Cup.

== Personal life ==
In 2007, she married John Cone, a former soccer player and coach.

== See also ==
- List of women's footballers with 100 or more international caps
- List of Olympic medalists in football
- List of 1996 Summer Olympics medal winners
- List of 2000 Summer Olympics medal winners
- List of 2004 Summer Olympics medal winners
- List of United States women's national soccer team hat-tricks
- List of University of North Carolina at Chapel Hill Olympians
- History of the United States women's national soccer team
