= Marci Jobson =

American soccer player and coach (born 1975)

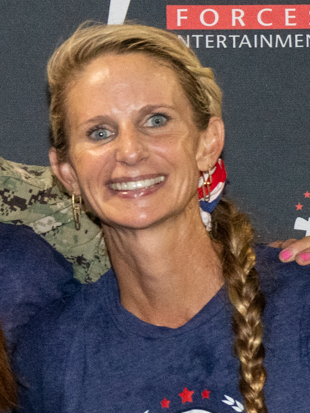
- Jobson in 2023

Personal information
- Full name: Marcia Miller Jobson
- Birth name: Marcia Seton Miller
- Date of birth: December 4, 1975 (age 50)
- Place of birth: St. Charles, Illinois, U.S.
- Height: 5 ft 7 in (1.70 m)
- Position: Midfielder

Youth career
- 1990–1994: St. Charles Fighting Saints

College career
Years	Team	Apps	(Gls)
1994–1995	Wisconsin Badgers		
1995–1998	SMU Mustangs		

Senior career*
Years	Team	Apps	(Gls)
1997–2000	Chicago Cobras		
1999	Turbine Potsdam	10	(1)
2001–2003	Atlanta Beat	40	(1)
2004	Charlotte Eagles	5	(1)
2005	Atlanta Silverbacks	4	(4)

International career
2005–2007	United States	17	(0)

Managerial career
- 2005–2007: Northern Illinois Huskies
- 2008–2014: Baylor Bears
- 2015–2021: Baylor Bears (assistant)
Medal record
Women's soccer
Representing the United States
FIFA Women's World Cup
Bronze medal – third place	2007 China	Team
- * Club domestic league appearances and goals

Marcia Miller Jobson (born Marcia Seton Miller; December 4, 1975) is a former American soccer midfielder and former head women's soccer coach at Baylor University.

== Career ==
=== Early career ===
Jobson grew up in St. Charles, Illinois, where she led St. Charles East High School to two state soccer championships. She first attended and played college soccer for the University of Wisconsin–Madison; after two years, she transferred to Southern Methodist University.

=== Chicago Cobras ===
She then played for the Chicago Cobras of the W-League for four seasons, from 1997 to 2000, scoring 15 goals and serving 22 assists as the team reached three Championship games, winning once in 2000.

In August 1999 Jobson scored one goal and assisted the other for Ann Cook as the Cobras lost the W-1 Championship to Raleigh Wings in a shootout after a 2–2 draw in front of a record 2,260 crowd at WRAL Soccer Center.

=== Turbine Potsdam ===
Immediately after the 1999 Championship game defeat, Jobson and Cobras teammate Lisa Krzykowski moved to Germany to play for Turbine Potsdam of the Frauen-Bundesliga. Jobson made 10 appearances and scored one goal for Turbine in 1999–2000.

=== Atlanta Beat ===
Jobson represented the Atlanta Beat of the Women's United Soccer Association (WUSA) for the three seasons of the professional league's existence. She was the Beat's fourth-round pick, 32nd overall in the inaugural draft.

In 2001 she recovered from a broken jaw sustained in preseason to play seven games scoring one goal, before suffering an anterior cruciate ligament injury on 17 June which caused her to miss the 2001 WUSA Founders Cup. In 2002, Jobson's season was characterized by rehabilitation. She started ten of 18 regular season appearances, was sent off against the Boston Breakers, and as a late substitute conceded a penalty kick in the 2–1 play-off defeat by Carolina Courage. In 2003 she made 15 regular season appearances (11 starts) and started the 2003 WUSA Founders Cup defeat by Washington Freedom.

=== W-League return ===
In 2004, she played for the W-League's Charlotte Lady Eagles, scoring once in five games, and in March 2005 signed for Atlanta Silverbacks. She scored four goals in four games for the Silverbacks in 2005.

== International career ==
Jobson made her first appearance for the U.S. women's team against Canada on June 26, 2005, making her the second-oldest American player to earn her first cap. In July 2007, she was chosen for the U.S. 2007 FIFA Women's World Cup squad, making her the oldest U.S. player by four years to be named to a first World Cup roster.

== Playing style ==
National team coach Greg Ryan described Jobson as a "fantastic defensive midfielder, very strong in the air but able to win balls on the ground," while former national team coach and WUSA color commentator Anson Dorrance admired her "work ethic". Jobson's coach at Atlanta Beat Tom Stone said of Jobson: "Her ability in the air is incomparable in our league and her tackles make her opponents shudder, but the value in her game lies in her heart".

== Coaching career ==
Jobson was named head coach at Northern Illinois for the 2004 season, where her husband Paul was an assistant coach. She and Paul co-coached at Baylor University, with Marci contributing a record of 78-43-24 from 2008-14 as Baylor's co-head coach. She stepped down to assistant coach in 2014, and both resigned at the end of 2021 with a combined record of 97-57-26, including back-to-back trips to the Elite Eight in 2017 and 2018. Marci and Paul founded Warrior Way, a training and consulting club.

== Personal life ==
Jobson is the youngest of eight children, whose names all begin with "M". She and Paul have four children.
