= Ann Cook (soccer) =

American soccer coach and former player (born 1974)

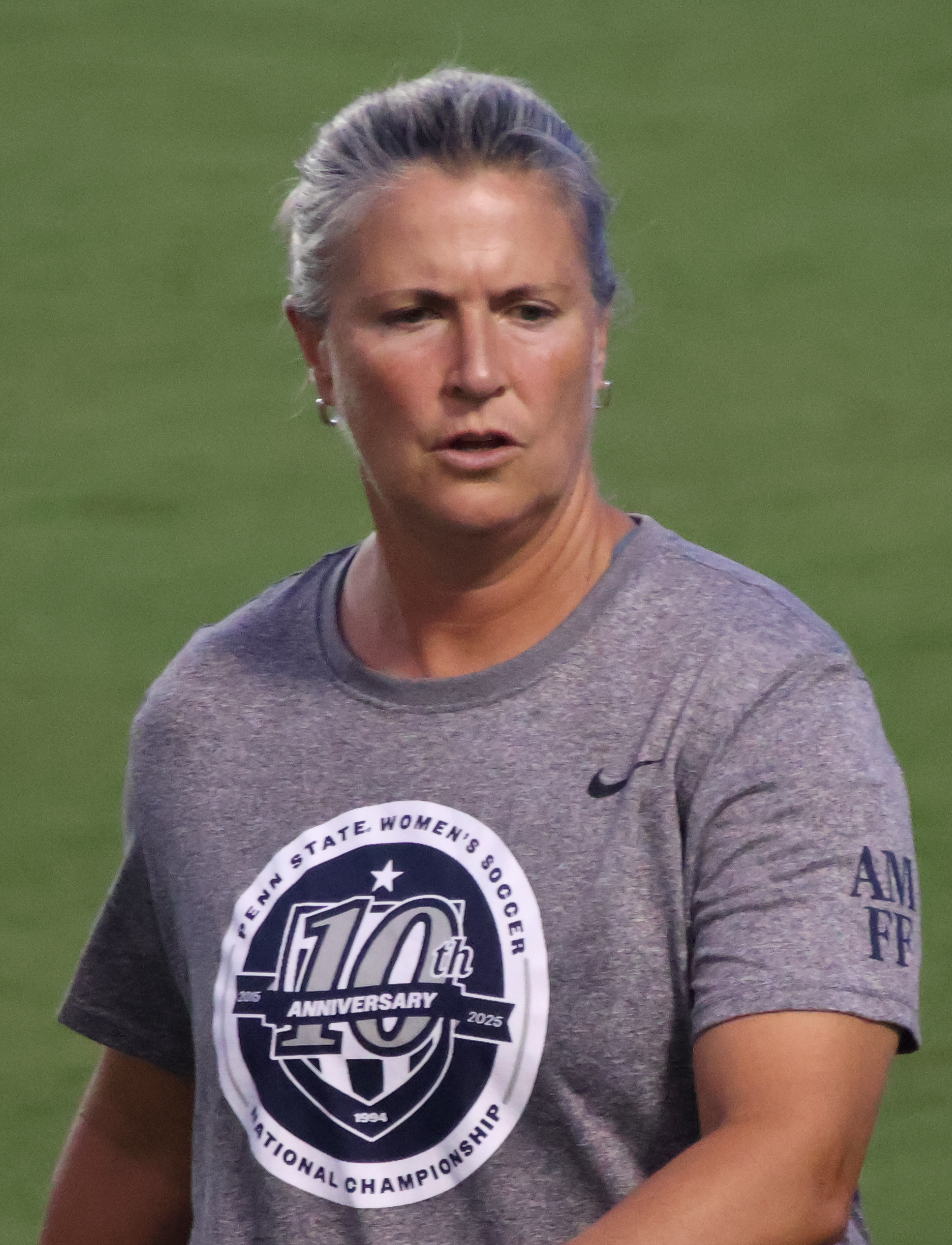
- Cook with Penn State in 2025

Personal information
- Full name: Rosalie Ann Cook
- Date of birth: October 25, 1974 (age 52)
- Place of birth: Springfield, Missouri, United States
- Height: 5 ft 5 in (1.65 m)
- Positions: Defender; midfielder

College career
Years	Team	Apps	(Gls)
1993–1997	William & Mary Tribe		

Senior career*
Years	Team	Apps	(Gls)
1998–2000	Chicago Cobras		
2001	Bay Area CyberRays	14	(0)
2002	Washington Freedom	18	(0)
2003	San Jose CyberRays	11	(0)

International career
1998	United States	1	(0)

Managerial career
- 1999–2000: Drury University
- 2007–: Penn State (assistant)
- * Club domestic league appearances and goals

Rosalie Ann Cook (born October 25, 1974) is an American soccer coach and former player who is the associate head coach of the Penn State Nittany Lions women's soccer team. A versatile defender or midfielder, she played for the San Jose CyberRays and Washington Freedom of Women's United Soccer Association (WUSA) and won a single cap for the senior United States women's national soccer team.

== Playing career ==
=== College ===
Cook attended the College of William & Mary and played college soccer. She graduated in 1997 with degrees in kinesiology and religion. With the Tribe, Cook was named all-Colonial Athletic Association in all four of her seasons and was selected as an all-American in 1993, 1995 and 1997. She was a finalist for the Hermann Trophy in 1995 and 1997. She redshirted in 1996 due to injury.

=== Club ===
Following her collegiate career, Cook played in the pro–am W-League for the Chicago Cobras. The Cobras won the W-League national championship in 2000, with Cook as Most Valuable Player (MVP). They had been national runners-up in 1999.

Women's United Soccer Association (WUSA), the first official professional women's soccer league in the United States, began in 2001. Cook was a fourth-round draft pick (25th overall in the global draft) by the Bay Area CyberRays. In 2001 versatile Cook started five of her 14 regular season appearances. In the championship game she substituted in for the injured playmaker Sissi as the CyberRays beat Atlanta Beat on a penalty shootout.

In December 2001 the CyberRays traded her to Washington Freedom for Michelle French. She started ten of 18 regular season appearances and posted one assist as the Freedom finished third. She featured in her second consecutive championship game but the Freedom lost 3–2 to Carolina Courage.

Ahead of the 2003 season, Cook attended the CyberRays' training camp as a free agent after she was waived by Washington Freedom. The team, now known as the San Jose CyberRays, gave Cook a contract after assessing her in training. She played 11 times, with three starts, posting one assist. In mid-season Cook had been waived again, to accommodate Amanda Cromwell's elevation to the active roster, only to be re-signed by the CyberRays as a reserve player. After the 2003 season, the CyberRays' Tisha Venturini, Kelly Lindsey and Cook all announced their retirement from soccer.

=== International ===
In 1993 and 1994 Cook was a member of the United States women's national under-20 soccer team squad.

Cook's only appearance on the senior United States women's national soccer team was on December 16, 1998, in a 2–1 win over Ukraine at University of California, Los Angeles. Although a behind closed doors match with an experimental United States line-up, it was nevertheless considered a full international fixture by the United States Soccer Federation (USSF). Cook provided an assist for Justi Baumgardt's winning goal.

The cap proved to be Cook's first and last, she could not break into the squad which reclaimed the FIFA Women's World Cup on home soil in 1999.

== Coaching career ==
After her retirement from playing, Cook became a full-time coach of college soccer. Since 2007, she has been employed by Penn State Nittany Lions.
