= 2003 WUSA Founders Cup =

Championship match of Women's United Soccer Association

- Event: 2003 WUSA season
Washington Freedom	Atlanta Beat
2	1
- Date: August 24, 2003
- Venue: Torero Stadium, San Diego, California
- Player of the Match: Abby Wambach (Freedom)
- Referee: Terry Vaughn
- Attendance: 7,106
- Weather: Sunshine; 79 °F (26 °C)

The 2003 WUSA Founders Cup, also known as Founders Cup III, was the third and final championship match in Women's United Soccer Association history, played between the Atlanta Beat and the Washington Freedom to decide the champion of the league's final season. The game was played at Torero Stadium in San Diego, California on August 24, 2003. The Washington Freedom defeated the Beat 2-1.

== Match ==
August 24, 2003

Washington Freedom	2–1 (a.e.t.)	Atlanta Beat
Wambach 7', 96'	Report	Hooper 46+' (pen.)

Torero Stadium,
San Diego, California
Attendance: 7,106
Referee: Terry Vaughn

Washington Freedom	Atlanta Beat

WASHINGTON FREEDOM:
GK	1	(United States) Siri Mullinix
DF	23	(United States) Skylar Little
DF	5	(United States) Carrie Moore
DF	14	(United States) Jennifer Grubb (c)	(yellow card) 82'
DF	13	(Germany) Sandra Minnert
MF	24	(United States) Jacqui Little
MF	16	(United States) Lindsay Stoecker	(substituted off) 70'
MF	22	(Germany) Steffi Jones
MF	8	(Australia) Kelly Golebiowski	(substituted off) 64'
FW	9	(United States) Mia Hamm
FW	28	(United States) Abby Wambach	(yellow card) 58'
Substitutes:
FW	15	(Germany) Jennifer Meier	(substituted in) 64'
FW	17	(United States) Casey Zimny	(substituted in) 70'
Coach:
(United States) Jim Gabarra

ATLANTA BEAT:
GK	1	(United States) Briana Scurry
DF	4	(United States) Kylie Bivens	(yellow card) 29'
DF	25	(United States) Nancy Augustyniak	(red card) 94'
DF	6	(Canada) Sharolta Nonen
DF	29	(United States) Leslie Gaston	(substituted off) 91'
MF	16	(United States) Marci Miller	(substituted off) 65'
MF	5	(United States) Nikki Serlenga	(substituted off) 46'
MF	12	(United States) Cindy Parlow	(substituted off) 89'
MF	8	(Japan) Homare Sawa
FW	10	(Canada) Charmaine Hooper	(yellow card) 78'
FW	9	(Germany) Conny Pohlers
Substitutes:
MF	13	(Mexico) Maribel Dominguez	(substituted in) 46'
MF	19	(United States) Kristin Warren	(substituted in) 65' (yellow card) 71'
MF	33	(United States) Callie Withers	(substituted in) 89'
DF	15	(United States) Julie Augustyniak	(substituted in) 91'
Coach:
(United States) Tom Stone

Player of the match

- Abby Wambach (Washington Freedom)

Match officials

- Assistant referees:
  - Karalee Sutton
  - Dinesh Signh
- Fourth official: Jennifer Bennett

Match rules

- 90 minutes.
- 15 minutes of golden goal extra-time if necessary.
- Penalty shoot-out if scores still level.
- Three named substitutes.
- Maximum of three substitutions.

=== Statistics ===
	Washington Freedom	Atlanta Beat
Total shots	20	9
Shots on target	8	6
Corner kicks	8	1
Fouls committed	15	20
Offsides	2	2
Yellow cards	2	3
Red cards	0	1
