= List of United States women's national soccer team hat-tricks =

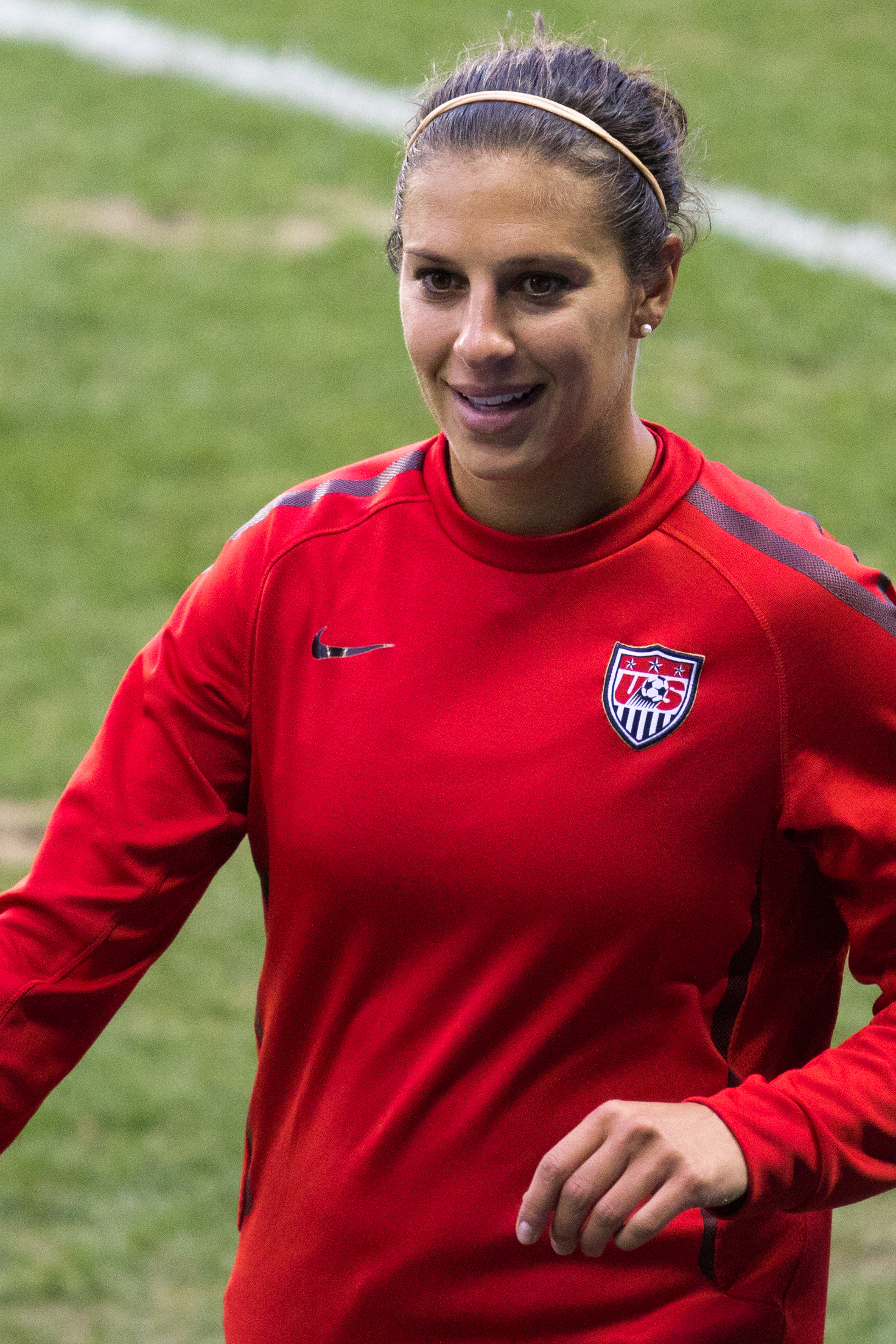
Carli Lloyd has nine international hat-tricks, including one in the 2015 World Cup final.

The United States women's national soccer team played their first international soccer match on August 18, 1985, losing to Italy 1–0 at the 1985 Mundialito. Since that first match, 29 U.S. international players have scored a hat-trick (three goals or more in a game). The first player to accomplish the feat was Carin Jennings, who had three goals against Japan on June 1, 1988. Nine players have scored five goals in a game: Michelle Akers, Brandi Chastain, Crystal Dunn, Sydney Leroux, Carli Lloyd, Tiffeny Milbrett, Alex Morgan, Amy Rodriguez, and Abby Wambach. Four-goal performances have been achieved by seven players; Wambach and Mia Hamm each did so twice. Multiple American players scored three goals or more in the same match on June 2, 2000, against Canada (Milbrett and Cindy Parlow); September 8, 2002, against Scotland (Hamm and Wambach); January 20, 2012, against the Dominican Republic (Rodriguez and Heather O'Reilly; and December 18, 2014, against Argentina (Lloyd and Christen Press).

The record for the most international hat-tricks by a U.S. women's national team player is 10, by Hamm; she scored three goals in a match eight times, along with her two four-goal games. Lloyd has nine hat-tricks; her ninth came in a 9–0 win against Paraguay on September 17, 2021, which was her five-goal performance. Parlow and Wambach each had eight hat-tricks. Along with one four-goal match, Parlow scored three goals on seven occasions. Wambach had three-goal efforts in five games, in addition to her three matches with four or five goals. Akers follows with seven hat-tricks, while Morgan has six. Milbrett and Press each have four hat-tricks. The most recent U.S. women's national team hat-trick was recorded by Emma Sears, who had three goals in a 6–0 win against New Zealand on October 29, 2025.

U.S. players have scored hat-tricks in the FIFA Women's World Cup four times. Akers' five-goal performance came in the quarterfinals of the 1991 World Cup against Chinese Taipei, in a 7–0 U.S. victory. She set the record for the most goals scored in a Women's World Cup match. In the semifinals of the 1991 tournament, Jennings posted a hat-trick as the U.S. won 5–2 over Germany. At the 2015 World Cup final against Japan, Lloyd scored three goals inside of the first 16 minutes of an eventual 5–2 U.S. win; her performance was punctuated by her final goal, a right-footed strike from the halfway line. Morgan matched Akers' record at the 2019 World Cup with five goals in the first group stage game for the U.S., a 13–0 rout of Thailand.

Three players have recorded hat-tricks against the U.S. national team. At the 2001 Algarve Cup, Ragnhild Gulbrandsen of Norway scored three times in her country's 4–3 win over the American side. Eleven years later, Christine Sinclair of Canada became the second player to score a hat-trick against the U.S., as she tallied three goals in the 2012 Olympic semifinals. Despite Sinclair's efforts, the U.S. defeated Canada 4–3 en route to winning the gold medal. In 2014, Marta accounted for all of Brazil's goals in a 3–2 victory against the U.S. at the International Women's Football Tournament of Brasília.

== Hat-tricks for the United States ==
Key

More than a hat-trick scored *

Table

The result is presented with the United States' score first.

Date	Goals	Player	Opponent	Venue	Competition	Result	Ref(s)
June 1, 1988	3	Carin Jennings	Japan	Panyu District	1988 FIFA Women's Invitation Tournament	5–2	
August 5, 1990	3	Michelle Akers	Soviet Union	Blaine Soccer Complex, Blaine, Minnesota	1990 North America Cup	8–0	
April 1, 1991	3	Michelle Akers	(Socialist Federal Republic of Yugoslavia) Yugoslavia	Varna	1991 Grand Varna Hotel Tournament	8–0	
April 7, 1991	3	Michelle Akers	Russia	Varna	1991 Grand Varna Hotel Tournament	5–0	
April 18, 1991	5*	Brandi Chastain	Mexico	Stade Sylvio Cator, Port-au-Prince	1991 CONCACAF Women's Championship	12–0	
April 20, 1991	3	April Heinrichs	Martinique	Stade Sylvio Cator, Port-au-Prince	1991 CONCACAF Women's Championship	12–0	
April 28, 1991	3	Michelle Akers	Canada	Stade Sylvio Cator, Port-au-Prince	1991 CONCACAF Women's Championship	5–0	
August 10, 1991	3	Michelle Akers	China PR	Anshan	Friendly	3–0	
November 24, 1991	5*	Michelle Akers	Chinese Taipei	New Plaza Stadium, Foshan	1991 FIFA Women's World Cup	7–0	
November 27, 1991	3	Carin Jennings	Germany	Guangdong Provincial People's Stadium, Guangzhou	1991 FIFA Women's World Cup	5–2	
July 7, 1993	3	Mia Hamm	Australia	Hamilton, Ontario	1993 Summer Universiade	6–0	
July 10, 1993	3	Sarah Rafanelli	Japan	Hamilton, Ontario	1993 Summer Universiade	7–0	
August 17, 1994	4*	Mia Hamm	Trinidad and Tobago	Montreal, Quebec	1994 CONCACAF Women's Championship	11–1	
February 24, 1995	3	Michelle Akers	Denmark	Showalter Field, Winter Park, Florida	Friendly	7–0	
April 12, 1995	3	Mia Hamm	Canada	Adolphe-Chéron Stadium, Saint-Maur-des-Fossés	1995 Tournoi International Feminin	5–0	
July 30, 1995	3	Tisha Venturini	Chinese Taipei	Memorial Stadium, New Britain, Connecticut	1995 Women's U.S. Cup	9–0	
January 18, 1996	3	Danielle Garrett	Ukraine	Estádio Brinco de Ouro, Campinas	1996 Torneio do Brasil	6–0	
April 28, 1996	4*	Mia Hamm	France	Kuntz Memorial Soccer Stadium, Indianapolis, Indiana	Friendly	8–2	
May 9, 1997	3	Mia Hamm	England	Spartan Stadium, San Jose, California	Friendly	5–0	
May 31, 1997	3	Mia Hamm	Canada	Veterans Stadium, New Britain, Connecticut	1997 Women's U.S. Cup	4–0	
March 17, 1998	3	Mia Hamm	China PR	Loulé	1998 Algarve Cup	4–1	
April 24, 1998	3	Tiffeny Milbrett	Argentina	Titan Stadium, Fullerton, California	Friendly	8–1	
June 28, 1998	3	Mia Hamm	Germany	Soldier Field, Chicago, Illinois	Friendly	4–2	
July 25, 1998	3	Mia Hamm	Denmark	Mitchel Athletic Complex, Uniondale, New York	1998 Goodwill Games	5–0	
December 20, 1998	3	Julie Foudy	Ukraine	Bulldog Stadium, Fresno, California	Friendly	5–0	
January 27, 1999	3	Kristine Lilly	Portugal	Seminole County Training Center, Orlando, Florida	Friendly	7–0	
April 29, 1999	4*	Tiffeny Milbrett	Japan	Ericsson Stadium, Charlotte, North Carolina	Friendly	9–0	
March 12, 2000	3	Cindy Parlow	Portugal	Hotel Montechoro Fields, Albufeira	2000 Algarve Cup	7–0	
April 5, 2000	3	Christie Welsh	Iceland	Richardson Stadium, Davidson, North Carolina	Friendly	8–0	
June 2, 2000	3	Tiffeny Milbrett	Canada	Sydney Football Stadium, Sydney	2000 Pacific Cup	9–1	
June 2, 2000	3	Cindy Parlow	Canada	Sydney Football Stadium, Sydney	2000 Pacific Cup	9–1	
June 4, 2000	3	Cindy Parlow	New Zealand	Campbelltown Stadium, Campbelltown	2000 Pacific Cup	5–0	
June 23, 2000	3	Cindy Parlow	Trinidad and Tobago	Hersheypark Stadium, Hershey, Pennsylvania	2000 CONCACAF Women's Gold Cup	11–0	
June 25, 2000	3	Nikki Serlenga	Costa Rica	Papa John's Cardinal Stadium, Louisville, Kentucky	2000 CONCACAF Women's Gold Cup	8–0	
January 12, 2002	3	Shannon MacMillan	Mexico	Blackbaud Stadium, Charleston, South Carolina	Friendly	7–0	
March 7, 2002	3	Shannon MacMillan	Denmark	Montechoro Training Complex, Albufeira	2002 Algarve Cup	3–2	
September 8, 2002	3	Mia Hamm	Scotland	Columbus Crew Stadium, Columbus, Ohio	Friendly	8–2	
September 8, 2002	3	Abby Wambach	Scotland	Columbus Crew Stadium, Columbus, Ohio	Friendly	8–2	
November 2, 2002	5*	Tiffeny Milbrett	Panama	Safeco Field, Seattle, Washington	2002 CONCACAF Women's Gold Cup	9–0	
November 6, 2002	3	Cindy Parlow	Costa Rica	Safeco Field, Seattle, Washington	2002 CONCACAF Women's Gold Cup	7–0	
April 26, 2003	4*	Shannon MacMillan	Canada	Robert F. Kennedy Memorial Stadium, Washington, D.C.	Friendly	6–1	
May 17, 2003	4*	Cindy Parlow	England	Legion Field, Birmingham, Alabama	Friendly	6–0	
February 25, 2004	3	Shannon Boxx	Trinidad and Tobago	Estadio Nacional, San José, Costa Rica	2004 CONCACAF Women's Pre-Olympic Tournament	7–0	
February 27, 2004	3	Cindy Parlow	Haiti	Estadio Eladio Rosabal Cordero, Heredia	2004 CONCACAF Women's Pre-Olympic Tournament	8–0	
March 20, 2004	3	Abby Wambach	Norway	Estádio Algarve, Faro	2004 Algarve Cup	4–1	
October 20, 2004	3	Cindy Parlow	Republic of Ireland	Soldier Field, Chicago, Illinois	Friendly	5–1	
October 23, 2004	5*	Abby Wambach	Republic of Ireland	Reliant Stadium, Houston, Texas	Friendly	5–0	
May 7, 2006	3	Abby Wambach	Japan	KK Wing Stadium, Kumamoto	Friendly	3–1	
October 1, 2006	3	Abby Wambach	Chinese Taipei	Home Depot Center, Carson, California	Friendly	10–0	
May 10, 2008	3	Natasha Kai	Canada	Robert F. Kennedy Memorial Stadium, Washington, D.C.	Friendly	6–0	
October 28, 2010	3	Abby Wambach	Haiti	Estadio Quintana Roo, Cancún	2010 CONCACAF Women's World Cup Qualifying	5–0	
October 30, 2010	3	Amy Rodriguez	Guatemala	Estadio Quintana Roo, Cancún	2010 CONCACAF Women's World Cup Qualifying	9–0	
January 20, 2012	3	Heather O'Reilly	Dominican Republic	BC Place, Vancouver	2012 CONCACAF Women's Olympic Qualifying Tournament	14–0	
January 20, 2012	5*	Amy Rodriguez	Dominican Republic	BC Place, Vancouver	2012 CONCACAF Women's Olympic Qualifying Tournament	14–0	
January 22, 2012	5*	Sydney Leroux	Guatemala	BC Place, Vancouver	2012 CONCACAF Women's Olympic Qualifying Tournament	13–0	
January 24, 2012	3	Carli Lloyd	Mexico	BC Place, Vancouver	2012 CONCACAF Women's Olympic Qualifying Tournament	4–0	
March 7, 2012	3	Alex Morgan	Sweden	Estadio Municipal Bela Vista, Parchal	2012 Algarve Cup	4–0	
November 28, 2012	3	Alex Morgan	Republic of Ireland	Jeld-Wen Field, Portland, Oregon	Friendly	5–0	
June 20, 2013	4*	Abby Wambach	South Korea	Red Bull Arena, Harrison, New Jersey	Friendly	5–0	
September 3, 2013	4*	Sydney Leroux	Mexico	Robert F. Kennedy Memorial Stadium, Washington, D.C.	Friendly	7–0	
October 26, 2014	4*	Abby Wambach	Costa Rica	PPL Park, Chester, Pennsylvania	2014 CONCACAF Women's Championship	6–0	
December 18, 2014	3	Carli Lloyd	Argentina	Estádio Nacional Mané Garrincha, Brasília	2014 International Women's Football Tournament of Brasília	7–0	
December 18, 2014	4*	Christen Press	Argentina	Estádio Nacional Mané Garrincha, Brasília	2014 International Women's Football Tournament of Brasília	7–0	
July 5, 2015	3	Carli Lloyd	Japan	BC Place, Vancouver	2015 FIFA Women's World Cup	5–2	
August 16, 2015	3	Christen Press	Costa Rica	Heinz Field, Pittsburgh, Pennsylvania	Friendly	8–0	
September 17, 2015	3	Carli Lloyd	Haiti	Ford Field, Detroit, Michigan	Friendly	5–0	
September 20, 2015	3	Carli Lloyd	Haiti	Legion Field, Birmingham, Alabama	Friendly	8–0	
December 10, 2015	3	Christen Press	Trinidad and Tobago	Alamodome, San Antonio, Texas	Friendly	6–0	
January 23, 2016	3	Carli Lloyd	Republic of Ireland	Qualcomm Stadium, San Diego, California	Friendly	5–0	
February 15, 2016	5*	Crystal Dunn	Puerto Rico	Toyota Stadium, Frisco, Texas	2016 CONCACAF Women's Olympic Qualifying Championship	10–0	
February 19, 2016	3	Alex Morgan	Trinidad and Tobago	BBVA Compass Stadium, Houston, Texas	2016 CONCACAF Women's Olympic Qualifying Championship	5–0	
September 15, 2016	3	Carli Lloyd	Thailand	Mapfre Stadium, Columbus, Ohio	Friendly	9–0	
November 10, 2016	3	Christen Press	Romania	Avaya Stadium, San Jose, California	Friendly	8–1	
July 26, 2018	3	Alex Morgan	Japan	Children's Mercy Park, Kansas City, Kansas	2018 Tournament of Nations	4–2	
October 7, 2018	3	Carli Lloyd	Panama	Sahlen's Stadium, Cary, North Carolina	2018 CONCACAF Women's Championship	5–0	
June 11, 2019	5*	Alex Morgan	Thailand	Stade Auguste-Delaune, Reims	2019 FIFA Women's World Cup	13–0	
January 31, 2020	3	Lindsey Horan	Panama	BBVA Stadium, Houston, Texas	2020 CONCACAF Women's Olympic Qualifying Championship	8–0	
January 18, 2021	3	Sam Mewis	Colombia	Exploria Stadium, Orlando, Florida	Friendly	4–0	
September 16, 2021	5*	Carli Lloyd	Paraguay	FirstEnergy Stadium, Cleveland, Ohio	Friendly	9–0	
September 21, 2021	3	Alex Morgan	Paraguay	TQL Stadium, Cincinnati, Ohio	Friendly	8–0	
April 9, 2022	3	Sophia Smith	Uzbekistan	Lower.com Field, Columbus, Ohio	Friendly	9–1	
October 29, 2025	3	Emma Sears	New Zealand	CPKC Stadium, Kansas City, Missouri	Friendly	6–0	

== Hat-tricks conceded by the United States ==
The result is presented with the United States' score first.

Date	Goals	Player	Opponent	Venue	Competition	Result	Ref
March 17, 2001	3	Ragnhild Gulbrandsen	Norway	Quarteira	2001 Algarve Cup	3–4	
August 6, 2012	3	Christine Sinclair	Canada	Old Trafford, Greater Manchester	2012 Summer Olympics	4–3	
December 14, 2014	3	Marta	Brazil	Estádio Nacional Mané Garrincha, Brasília	2014 International Women's Football Tournament of Brasília	2–3	

== Hat-trick of own goals against the United States ==
The result is presented with the United States' score first.

Date	Own goals	Player	Opponent	Venue	Competition	Result	Ref
January 20, 2022	3	Meikayla Moore	New Zealand	Dignity Health Sports Park, Carson, California	2022 SheBelieves Cup	5–0	

== Bibliography ==
- Crothers, Time (2010). The Man Watching: Anson Dorrance and the University of North Carolina Women's Soccer Dynasty. St. Martin's Press. ISBN 978-0-312-61609-0.
- Theivam, Kieran; Kassouf, Jeff (2019). The Making of the Women's World Cup: Defining stories from a sport's coming of age. Little, Brown Book Group. ISBN 978-1-47214-331-0. (Unpaginated version consulted online via Google Books)
- U.S. Soccer 2018 Women's National Team Media Guide. U.S. Soccer. 2018.
