= Kelly Lindsey =

American soccer player and coach

Personal information
- Full name: Kelly Ann Lindsey
- Date of birth: September 3, 1979 (age 47)
- Place of birth: Omaha, Nebraska, United States
- Height: 5 ft 6 in (1.68 m)
- Position: Defender

College career
Years	Team	Apps	(Gls)
1997–2000	Notre Dame Fighting Irish	91	(4)

Senior career*
Years	Team	Apps	(Gls)
2001–2003	San Jose CyberRays	47	(0)
Total		47	(0)

International career
2000–2002	United States	4	(0)

Managerial career
- 2003: Colorado Buffaloes (assistant)
- 2004–2005: Texas Longhorns (assistant)
- 2006–2008: Saint Mary's Gaels
- 2009: Sky Blue FC
- 2016–2020: Afghanistan
- 2020–2021: Morocco (coach and director)
- 2021–2023: Lewes F.C.
- 2023–2024: Al-Ittihad
- 2024–: Lewes F.C.
- * Club domestic league appearances and goals

Kelly Ann Lindsey (born September 3, 1979) is an American soccer coach and former defender who played for the United States women's national soccer team and the San Jose CyberRays of Women's United Soccer Association (WUSA). She is the COO and Head of Football Performance and Club Operations at Lewes F.C.

== Playing career ==
=== College ===
Lindsey attended and played college soccer for the University of Notre Dame. A tough defender with the Fighting Irish, Lindsey backstopped the team to a runners-up finish in the 1999 NCAA Division I Women's Soccer Championship.

=== Club ===
From 2001 to 2003, Lindsey played for the San Jose CyberRays of the professional Women's United Soccer Association. She was the number one pick in the 2001 WUSA supplemental draft. In 2001 the CyberRays won the championship game, beating Atlanta Beat on a penalty shootout. Soccer America magazine named Lindsey the 2001 Rookie of the Year.

After the 2003 season, Lindsey reluctantly retired from professional soccer at the age of 23, due to persistent knee injuries.

=== International ===
Lindsey's first appearance on the United States women's national soccer team was on January 7, 2000, in an 8–1 win over Czech Republic in Melbourne, Australia. She collected a total of four caps over the following two years, but was not included in the US squads for the 2000 Sydney Olympics, or the 2003 FIFA Women's World Cup.

== Managing career ==
In 2003, Lindsey coached the University of Colorado to their first ever NCAA tournament selection. Then she trained the University of Texas and Saint Mary's (2006–2008). In 2009, she took the lead of Sky Blue FC, part of the newly formed Women's Professional Soccer League after Head Coach Ian Sawyers was terminated. Lindsay resigned with two weeks left in the regular season without explanation and Sky Blue FC went on to win the Championship.

Lindsey has also coached the USA U21 women's team as well as on the USA U14 national development program.

In 2016, she took the role of Head Coach for the Afghanistan women's national football team.

In February 2019, she was appointed as CONIFA's first ever director of women's football.

In 2020, she was named as the Royal Moroccan Football Federation women's football director and head coach of the Morocco women's national football team. She also worked as director for the national team with the hiring of coach Reynald Pedros.

Lindsey later became the sporting director and head of performance at Lewes F.C. for two years, before joining Saudi Women's Premier League club Al-Ittihad in July 2023.

In 2024 Lindsey returned to Lewes FC as COO and Head of Football Performance and Club Operations.

== Personal life ==
Lindsey was nicknamed Boof by players and supporters, owing to her hairstyle.
