= Leslie Gaston =

American soccer player

Leslie Gaston Marcus
Personal information
- Full name: Leslie Gaston Marcus
- Birth name: Leslie Anne Gaston
- Date of birth: August 9, 1980 (age 46)
- Place of birth: Montgomery, Alabama, U.S.
- Height: 5 ft 5 in (1.65 m)
- Position: Defender

Youth career
- 1994–1997: Briarwood Lady Lightning
- 1995–1997: Saint James Trojans (boys)
- 1997–199?: Tophat Soccer Club
- 1998: Saint James Lady Trojans

College career
Years	Team	Apps	(Gls)
1999–2002	North Carolina Tar Heels	92	(10)

Senior career*
Years	Team	Apps	(Gls)
2003	Atlanta Beat	18	(0)
2005–2006	Atlanta Silverbacks		

International career
1997	United States U17		
- * Club domestic league appearances and goals

Leslie Gaston Marcus (born Leslie Anne Gaston; August 9, 1980) is an American former soccer player who played as a defender.

== Career ==
=== Youth ===
Gaston began playing soccer at the age of four, and played on boys' club teams until 1994. In 1995, she played on the boys' varsity soccer team of Saint James School as a captain, and was an all-city selection. She tore her ACL in late 2005, but returned from injury to compete in track and field in early 1996. She was as a state finalist in the 4 × 100, and finished fifth in the 100 and 200 meters, earning her the 1996 Rehab Associates award for the comeback of the year. She again competed in boys' varsity soccer and track in early 1997. She finished third in the state in the long jump and sixth in the 100 meters for track, and was a 1997 Parade and NSCAA All-American. She was the captain of the girls' varsity soccer team in early 1998, earning her all-state honors.

Gaston was named on regional Olympic Development Program teams from 1993 to 1995, 1997 and 1998. She played for the Briarwood Lady Lightning club team from 1994 to early 1997, before joining Atlanta's Tophat Soccer Club in late 1997. With Tophat, she won the 1997 state championship in, the 1997 WAGS Premier Cup, the 1998 Junior Orange Bowl championship, and the 1998 Region 3 championship. She was also named to the U.S. under-17 national team pool in 1997, and made the under-18 team in 1998 before withdrawing due to injury.

=== College ===
Gaston joined the North Carolina Tar Heels on an athletic scholarship in 1998. However, she redshirted during the 1998 season due to an ACL injury. In her debut 1999 season, she played a reserve role, suffering a torn MCL in her only start of the season, resulting in her missing several games during the season. The team went on to win the 1999 national championship. She played a greater role during her second season as a defensive midfielder, scoring four goals and recording one assist in 24 appearances as the team went on to win the 2000 national championship. She started all 25 games of the 2001 season primarily as a left-back, scoring three goals and recording two assists. In her final season she made 26 appearances and scored one goal. She was an All-American in 2002, selected to the second team by the NSCAA and third team by Soccer Buzz, and was named as the most valuable player of the ACC tournament. For the same season, she was included in the All-ACC second team, and was included in the All-Southeast Region by the NSCAA and Soccer Buzz. During her college career, she made 92 appearances for the Tar Heels, scoring ten goals and recording four assists.

=== Club ===
After finishing her college career, Gaston was selected as the second pick of the second round of the 2003 WUSA Draft (tenth overall) by the Atlanta Beat. She made her debut for Atlanta on April 5, 2003, against the New York Power, assisting Kylie Bivens's opening goal of a 5–0 win. Gaston made 18 regular season appearances during the 2003 season, with the team finishing second and qualifying for the playoffs. In the semifinal against the San Diego Spirit, she assisted Charmaine Hooper's winning golden goal four minutes into extra time to advance to the 2003 WUSA Founders Cup. She started in the Founders Cup against the Washington Freedom, earning a penalty at the end of the first half, which Charmaine Hooper converted to equalize the score at 1–1. Gaston was substituted out before the start of extra time, with Atlanta going on to lose six minutes later to a golden goal by Abby Wambach.

Gaston played for the Atlanta Silverbacks in the USL W-League from 2005 to 2006. She was named the defensive player of the year for the 2006 W-League season, and was included on the All W-League and All-Central Conference teams.

In July 2009, the newly founded Atlanta Beat in Women's Professional Soccer named Gaston as an assistant coach for the team's inaugural 2010 season. However, she ultimately did not serve on the team's coaching staff.

== Personal life ==
Gaston was born to Eddie and Sally Gaston in Montgomery, Alabama, where she grew up and attended Saint James School, graduating in June 1998. She went on to graduate from the University of North Carolina at Chapel Hill in December 2002 with a bachelor's degree in communications. After the Women's United Soccer Association folded in 2003, she began working as a marketing coordinator for arts and entertainment at The Atlanta Journal-Constitution. She married her husband David Marcus in April 2009, working at the time at a graphic design firm. They resided in Atlanta until 2014, when they relocated with their 2 children to Carbondale, Colorado.

Gaston dealt with numerous injuries during her career, primarily on her knee, requiring sixteen surgeries. Her first knee surgery occurred in high school, while the remaining ten were in college. This included five surgeries to replace her anterior cruciate ligament. However, she continued to play soccer against the advice of doctors. Despite dealing with knee pain after finishing her career, she would later state: "if I had to do it all over again, I wouldn't change anything. I know that sounds strange. But all the injuries have shaped my character and life in a way that I never thought something as devastating as having five ACLs could. I know whatever obstacles I face, I can get through them." She also broke her right leg, broke her ankle twice, bruised her kidney, broke her collarbone, and had four concussions all before finishing high school.
