= Carrie Moore (disambiguation) =

Carrie or Kerry Moore may refer to:

- Carrie Moore (1882-1956), Australian actress
- Carrie Moore (basketball) (born 1985), American basketball player
- Carrie Moore (soccer) (born 1978), American soccer player
- Kerry Thompson-Moore (born 1978), English field hockey player
