= Carey Dorn =

American soccer player

Personal information
- Date of birth: October 3, 1978 (age 48)
- Place of birth: Seoul, South Korea
- Height: 1.57 m (5 ft 2 in)
- Position: Midfielder

College career
Years	Team	Apps	(Gls)
1996–1999	UConn Huskies	92	(6)

Senior career*
Years	Team	Apps	(Gls)
2001–2002	San Jose CyberRays	32	(0)
- * Club domestic league appearances and goals

Carey O'Brien (née Dorn; born October 3, 1978 in Seoul) is a retired American soccer player who played for the San Jose CyberRays. Dorn was a 5th round pick in the 2000 WUSA Draft.

== Early life and education ==
Dorn was born in Seoul on October 3, 1978. She attended Hall High School in West Hartford, Connecticut, where she played for the school's soccer and tennis team, graduating in 1996. In 2000, she graduated magna cum laude from the University of Connecticut with a bachelor's degree in sports marketing. Following graduation, she received the John McClendon Memorial and the NCAA Enhancement Postgraduate Scholarships. She immediately began her graduate program, though after being drafted by the Bay Area CyberRays, she took time off, returning to the University of Connecticut in 2003 to receive a master's master's degree in sports management.

== Career ==
=== Athletic career ===
While attending the University of Connecticut, Dorn played for the university's team. Her senior year, she served as team captain her senior year and earned NSCAA Academic All-American honors.

Upon the creation of the Women's United Soccer Association (WUSA) in 2000, Dorn was drafted by the Bay Area CyberRays. She became the first member of the team to score a goal. With her help, the team won the 2001 WUSA Founders Cup. In 2003, she announced her retirement as she entered graduate school.

=== Coaching ===
Between 1997 and 2000, Dorn was the assistant coach for Windsor World Class.

Beginning in 2001, she volunteered as an assistant coach for the University of Connecticut's women's soccer team. Two seasons later, she was hired into the position, which she held until 2011. During that time, the team secured seven appearances in the NCAA Tournament, notably reaching the NCAA Championship game in 2003 and the NCAA Quarterfinals in 2007; they also clinched the 2004 Big East Tournament Championship.

In 2005, Dorn worked with the developmental programs, including an under-10 developmental team and the U-13 Connecticut Olympic Development Program.

Around 2011, Dorn took a position as the head girls' soccer coach at Loomis Chaffee School. In 2013, she was named the CGSCA Private School State Coach of the Year. The following year, the NSCAA named her the Private/Parochial Connecticut State Coach of the Year.

In 2018, she returned to the University of Connecticut, where she remained in 2023.

== Honors ==
In 2006, Dorn was inducted into the Connecticut Girls' Soccer Coaches Association Hall of Fame.

== Personal life ==
As of 2023, O'Brien lived in West Hartford, Connecticut with her husband and three sons.
