= LaKeysia Beene =

American soccer goalkeeper (born 1978)

Personal information
- Full name: LaKeysia Rene Beene
- Date of birth: March 9, 1978 (age 48)
- Place of birth: Sumter, South Carolina, United States
- Height: 5 ft 7 in (1.70 m)
- Position: Goalkeeper

College career
Years	Team	Apps	(Gls)
1996–1999	Notre Dame Fighting Irish	90	(0)

Senior career*
Years	Team	Apps	(Gls)
- California Storm
2001–2003	San Jose CyberRays	59	(0)
- California Storm

International career
2000–2003	United States	18	(0)
- * Club domestic league appearances and goals

LaKeysia Rene Beene (born March 9, 1978) is an American former soccer goalkeeper who played for the United States women's national soccer team and the San Jose CyberRays of Women's United Soccer Association (WUSA).

== Playing career ==
=== College ===
Beene attended and played college soccer as goalkeeper for the University of Notre Dame. She graduated in 1999 having majored in environmental geoscience. With the Fighting Irish, Beene was a two-time All-American and backstopped the team to a runners-up finish in the 1999 NCAA Division I Women's Soccer Championship.

=== Club ===
In 2000, Beene became one of the 24 founding players of the Women's United Soccer Association, (WUSA), the first official professional women's soccer league in the United States. From 2001 to 2003, she played for the San Jose CyberRays. In 2001, Beene was named WUSA goalkeeper of the year, as the CyberRays won the championship game, beating Atlanta Beat on a penalty shootout.

Beene previously played for pro–am Women's Premier Soccer League (WPSL) team California Storm. She returned to the Storm when WUSA collapsed after the 2003 season.

=== International ===
Beene's first appearance on the United States women's national soccer team was on January 7, 2000, in an 8–1 win over Czech Republic in Melbourne, Australia. She collected a total of 18 caps over the following three years, but was not included in the US squads for the 2000 Sydney Olympics, or the 2003 FIFA Women's World Cup.

==== International statistics ====
United States
Year	Apps	Goals
2000	3	0
2001	1	0
2002	9	0
2003	5	0
Total	18	0

== Personal life ==
Beene was a teenage Tang Soo Do champion. She graduated from the University of Notre Dame in January 2005 with a B.S. in environmental geosciences.

She was admitted to The State Bar of California in 2009 and currently practices environmental law in Sacramento.
