= Casey Zimny =

Retired American soccer player

Personal information
- Date of birth: January 26, 1980 (age 46)
- Place of birth: Rochester, New York
- Position: Forward

College career
Years	Team	Apps	(Gls)
1998–2001	UConn Huskies		

Senior career*
Years	Team	Apps	(Gls)
2002–2003	Washington Freedom	29	(1)

International career
2001	United States U21		
- * Club domestic league appearances and goals

Casey Zimny is a retired American soccer player who played for Washington Freedom.

== Honors ==
- 2003 WUSA Founders Cup
