= Lisa Krzykowski =

American soccer player

Personal information
- Date of birth: September 10, 1976 (age 50)
- Place of birth: Milwaukee, Wisconsin, United States
- Height: 5 ft 8 in (1.73 m)
- Position: Defender

College career
Years	Team	Apps	(Gls)
1994–1997	Milwaukee Panthers		(57)

Senior career*
Years	Team	Apps	(Gls)
2001–2002	Atlanta Beat	31	(1)
2003	San Diego Spirit	21	(0)
- * Club domestic league appearances and goals

Lisa Cantrell (née Krzykowski; born September 10, 1976, in Milwaukee) is a retired American soccer player who played for the Atlanta Beat.

== Early life and education ==
Krzykowski was born in Milwaukee, Wisconsin, on September 10, 1976. She grew up in Cedarburg, Wisconsin, and attended Cedarburg High School, where she excelled in both soccer and basketball. Her senior year, the girls' soccer team played in the statement championships for the first time, finishing in the runner-up position. Krzykowski received First Team All-State and First Team All-American honors in soccer, and held school records for her basketball performance.

From 1993 to 1998, she attended the University of Wisconsin–Milwaukee. In 1997, she was named a second-team Academic All-American, followed by the league's Coleman Medal of Honor the next year, recognizing her as the league's top female student-athlete. She graduated magna cum laude with the title of Midwestern Collegiate Conference Scholar-Athlete.

== Career ==
While studying at the University of Wisconsin–Milwaukee from 1994 to 1998, Krzykowski played for the school's women's soccer team. All four years, she was included in the first-team All-Midwestern Collegiate Conference (MCC) and All-Great Lakes Region lineup. She earned a spot on the MCC All-Tournament Team three times. In 1995 and 1997, she was named MCC Player of the Year. Upon graduation, she held five school records: career goals (57), goals in a single season (16), assists in a game (5), assists in a season (12), and assists in her career (27).

Following graduation, Krzykowski played semi-professionally for the Chicago Cobras in the USL W-League, where she won the 2000 W-League National Championship.

Immediately after the Cobras' 1999 W-League Championship game defeat by Raleigh Wings, Krzykowski and Cobras teammate Marci Miller moved to Germany to play for Turbine Potsdam of the Frauen-Bundesliga. Krzykowski made four appearances for Turbine in 1999–2000.

Upon the foundation of the Women's United Soccer Association (WUSA) in 2000, Krzykowski was drafted to play for the Atlanta Beat. She was the Beat's seventh-round pick, 56th overall in the inaugural draft. Upon signing, she became the "first woman from Wisconsin to ever play professional soccer". In 2002, she broke her left ulna during a game, resulting in a mid-season break. She played as a starting defender for two seasons before being waived and transferring to the San Diego Spirit, where she played in the back line.

== Honors ==
Krzykowski was inducted into the University of Wisconsin–Milwaukee Hall of Fame in 2004, the Cedarburg High School Hall of Fame in 2012, and the Wisconsin Soccer Hall of Fame in 2019.

== Personal life ==
Cantrell is married and has two daughters. She lives with her family in Douglasville, Georgia.
