= List of WUSA drafts =

List of Women's United Soccer Association drafts

The following is a list of drafts held by Women's United Soccer Association (WUSA), with a brief description of each.

== Inaugural season ==
- 2000 WUSA player allocation – Twenty-four players from the United States women's national soccer team player pool told the league which of the seven initial teams they would like to play for, with the teams likewise telling the league which players they wanted. The league announced which players would go to which teams on May 24, 2000.
- 2000 WUSA foreign player allocation – On October 31, 2000, sixteen of the top international players in the world were grouped into eight pairs with each WUSA team receiving one selection.
- 2000 WUSA draft – On December 10–11, 2000, each WUSA team received one selection from each round of a 15-round inaugural main draft.
- 2001 WUSA supplemental draft – On February 4, 2001, each WUSA team made four further selections in a four-round draft for recent graduates and late entrants to the draft pool.
- 2001 WUSA waiver draft – On March 20, 2001, each WUSA team made up to four further selections in a four-round draft for players made available when team rosters were reduced on 18 March, 2001.

== Second season ==
- 2002 WUSA draft – The college draft for the second season took place on February 11, 2002, in Sunrise, Florida.

== Third season ==
- 2003 WUSA draft – The college draft for the third and final season took place on February 2, 2003, in Atlanta, Georgia.

== See also ==
- List of WPS drafts
- List of NWSL drafts
