= Carrie Moore (soccer) =

American soccer player

Personal information
- Date of birth: July 22, 1978 (age 48)
- Place of birth: Roanoke, Virginia, United States
- Height: 1.62 m (5 ft 4 in)
- Position: Defender

College career
Years	Team	Apps	(Gls)
1996–1999	William & Mary Tribe	90	

Senior career*
Years	Team	Apps	(Gls)
2001–2003	Washington Freedom	46	(0)
- * Club domestic league appearances and goals

Carrie O'Keeffe (née Moore) (born July 22, 1978) is a retired American soccer player who played for the Washington Freedom.

== Career ==
While attending the College of William & Mary, Moore played for the university's soccer team. Her senior year, she achieved All-CAA selection (Colonial Athletic Association). Moore's success in college soccer lead her to be spotted by professional soccer teams in the Women's United Soccer Association.

Carrie Moore was a 14th round pick in the 2000 WUSA Draft by the WUSA team Washington Freedom. With Carrie Moore's help she helped Washington Freedom to win the 2003 WUSA Founders Cup. After the collapse of the Women's United Soccer Association in 2003, Carrie Moore became a coach for Hollins University soccer programme.

== Honors ==
Washington Freedom

- WUSA Founders Cup: 2003
