= Gayle Smith Wilson =

American soccer player (born 1967)

Personal information
- Full name: Gayle Smith Wilson
- Birth name: Gayle Jennifer Smith
- Date of birth: November 10, 1967 (age 58)
- Place of birth: Virginia, United States
- Height: 5 ft 3 in (1.60 m)
- Position: Midfielder

Youth career
- BRYC Cobras
- 1982–1986: McLean Highlanders

College career
Years	Team	Apps	(Gls)
1986–1989	Virginia Cavaliers		

Senior career*
Years	Team	Apps	(Gls)
1993–2000	Maryland Pride		
1995	Washington Mustangs		
1999	Northern Virginia Majestics		

International career
1992	United States	2	(0)

Managerial career
- 2000–2001: Northern Virginia Royals
- 2006–2018: Marymount Saints
- * Club domestic league appearances and goals

Gayle Smith Wilson (born Gayle Jennifer Smith; November 10, 1967) is an American former soccer player who played as a midfielder, making two appearances for the United States women's national team.

== Career ==
Smith Wilson played soccer for McLean Highlanders in high school, where she was selected as Virginia High School Player of the Year in 1986. She also played field hockey for McLean. In college, she played for the Virginia Cavaliers from 1986 to 1989, the first full-scholarship women's player at the school, where she was a letter-winner and the team captain during her junior and senior seasons. She was selected as a Soccer America MVP in 1987 and 1988, and was included in the as an All-ACC selection in 1987 and 1989, as well as in the NSCAA All-Region selection in 1987, 1988, and 1989. She was chosen as Virginia's Most Valuable Athlete for the 1988–89 season, and was a finalist for the Hermann Trophy in 1989, the most prestigious annual college soccer award.

Smith Wilson made her international debut for the United States on August 14, 1992, in a friendly match against Norway, which finished as a 1–3 loss. She earned her second and final cap two days later against the same opponent, which finished as a 2–4 loss.

Smith Wilson has played for the Maryland Pride between 1993 and 2000, the Washington Mustangs men's team in the USISL Premier League in 1995, and the Northern Virginia Majestics in 1999.

In 2005, Smith Wilson was inducted into the Virginia–D.C. Soccer Hall of Fame, as well as the McLean High School Athletic Hall of Fame in 2013. She holds a U.S. Soccer National 'A' license, and has been coaching in the D.C. metro area since 1990 with the Washington Area Girls Soccer and the National Capital Soccer League. She also has coached for the USL Northern Virginia Royals (2000–2001), VYSA Olympic Development Program (2002–2012), D.C. United Super Y League (2004–2008), and APD-Arlington Player Development (2006–2008). In 2010, she was named the Arlington Soccer Association Girls Coach of the Year. Smith Wilson coached the Marymount Saints women's team between 2006 and 2018.

== Personal life ==
Smith Wilson holds a Bachelor of Science in sport management from the University of Virginia. She is married and has one daughter. She was the department head and physical education teacher at The Langley School in McLean, Virginia from 1996 to 2006. She also worked as a fitness director and personal trainer at the McLean Racquet and Health Club from 1990 to 2010.

== Career statistics ==
=== International ===
United States
Year	Apps	Goals
1992	2	0
Total	2	0
