= 2001 Women's United Soccer Association season =

2001 season of Women's United Soccer Association

Women's United Soccer Association
- Season: 2001
- Champions: Bay Area CyberRays
- Goals scored: 235
- Average goals/game: 2.80
- Top goalscorer: Tiffeny Milbrett (16)

The 2001 Women's United Soccer Association season served as the inaugural season for WUSA, the top level professional women's soccer league in the United States. The regular season began on April 14 and ended on August 12, with the postseason games being held on August 18 and August 25.

Attendance figures were high for the first season, particularly early in the season, though not near the levels organizers were expecting based on the attendance for the 1999 FIFA Women's World Cup. The league spent its initial $40m budget, intended to last five years, in just this first season.

== Competition format ==
- The season began on April 14 and ended on August 12.
- Each team played a total of 21 games, three against each opponent (either twice at home and once away or vice versa). This caused an uneven schedule with teams hosting either 10 or 11 home games each.
- The four teams with the most points from the regular season qualified for the playoffs. The regular season champions and runners-up hosted the fourth- and third-placed teams, respectively, in the single-game semifinals on August 18. The winners of the semifinals met at Foxboro Stadium for the final on August 25.

=== Results table ===
Abbreviation and Color Key: Atlanta Beat - ATL • Bay Area CyberRays - BAY • Boston Breakers - BOS • Carolina Courage - CAR New York Power - NYP • Philadelphia Charge - PHI • San Diego Spirit - SDS • Washington Freedom - WSH Win • Loss • Tie • Home
Club	Match																				
Club	1	2	3	4	5	6	7	8	9	10	11	12	13	14	15	16	17	18	19	20	21
Atlanta Beat	NYP	PHI	BOS	SDS	PHI	BAY	CAR	BOS	WSH	SDS	CAR	PHI	WSH	NYP	BAY	NYP	CAR	SDS	BOS	WSH	BAY
Atlanta Beat	0-0	0-0	0-1	1-1	0-2	0-1	0-2	1-1	2-1	3-2	1-1	1-1	3-2	0-3	1-1	2-1	3-2	3-1	0-1	1-2	4-0
Bay Area CyberRays	WSH	BOS	PHI	CAR	BOS	ATL	SDS	NYP	CAR	PHI	SDS	NYP	WSH	BOS	ATL	WSH	SDS	CAR	PHI	NYP	ATL
Bay Area CyberRays	1-0	1-1	3-2	2-1	2-4	0-1	3-1	0-0	2-0	3-0	0-0	1-0	2-3	0-2	1-1	1-0	0-2	1-2	3-2	0-1	4-0
Boston Breakers	CAR	BAY	ATL	WSH	BAY	PHI	NYP	ATL	SDS	WSH	NYP	SDS	CAR	BAY	PHI	CAR	NYP	WSH	ATL	SDS	PHI
Boston Breakers	0-1	1-1	0-1	2-2	2-4	2-3	2-3	1-1	3-1	1-0	3-1	3-1	2-1	0-2	1-2	1-2	4-2	2-1	0-1	0-1	2-1
Carolina Courage	BOS	WSH	NYP	BAY	WSH	SDS	ATL	NYP	PHI	BAY	ATL	WSH	PHI	BOS	SDS	BOS	ATL	BAY	NYP	PHI	SDS
Carolina Courage	0-1	1-2	3-1	2-1	2-2	4-3	0-2	2-4	3-0	2-0	1-1	2-0	2-0	2-1	2-0	1-2	3-2	1-2	0-1	5-1	2-2
New York Power	ATL	SDS	CAR	PHI	SDS	WSH	BOS	CAR	BAY	PHI	BOS	SDS	BAY	ATL	WSH	ATL	BOS	PHI	CAR	BAY	WSH
New York Power	0-0	0-0	3-1	2-2	0-1	1-2	2-3	2-4	0-0	2-1	3-1	1-1	1-0	0-3	2-1	2-1	4-2	2-1	0-1	0-1	0-2
Philadelphia Charge	SDS	ATL	BAY	NYP	ATL	BOS	WSH	WSH	CAR	NYP	BAY	ATL	CAR	SDS	BOS	WSH	NYP	BAY	CAR	SDS	BOS
Philadelphia Charge	0-2	0-0	3-2	2-2	0-2	2-3	0-2	1-2	3-0	2-1	3-0	1-1	2-0	3-0	1-2	0-2	2-1	3-2	5-1	1-1	2-1
San Diego Spirit	PHI	NYP	WSH	ATL	NYP	CAR	BAY	BOS	ATL	WSH	BAY	NYP	BOS	PHI	CAR	BAY	ATL	WSH	BOS	PHI	CAR
San Diego Spirit	0-2	0-0	2-0	1-1	0-1	4-3	0-1	3-1	3-2	2-3	0-0	1-1	3-1	3-0	2-0	0-2	3-1	2-2	0-1	1-1	2-2
Washington Freedom	BAY	CAR	SDS	BOS	CAR	NYP	PHI	PHI	ATL	BOS	SDS	CAR	WSH	BAY	NYP	BAY	PHI	BOS	SDS	ATL	NYP
Washington Freedom	1-0	1-2	2-0	2-2	2-2	1-2	0-2	1-2	2-1	1-0	2-3	2-0	3-2	2-3	2-1	1-0	0-2	2-1	2-2	1-2	0-2

== Standings ==
Pos	Team	Pld	W	D	L	GF	GA	GD	Pts	Qualification
1	Atlanta Beat	21	10	7	4	31	21	+10	37	Regular Season Championship
2	Bay Area CyberRays	21	11	4	6	27	23	+4	37	Qualification to play-offs
3	New York Power	21	9	5	7	30	25	+5	32	Qualification to play-offs
4	Philadelphia Charge	21	9	4	8	35	28	+7	31	Qualification to play-offs
5	San Diego Spirit	21	7	7	7	29	28	+1	28	
6	Boston Breakers	21	8	3	10	29	35	−6	27	
7	Washington Freedom	21	6	3	12	26	35	−9	21	
8	Carolina Courage	21	6	3	12	28	40	−12	21	

Updated to match(es) played on August 2001. Source:

== Playoffs ==
Home teams listed second

Semi-Finals
3	New York Power	2
2	Bay Area CyberRays	3
4	Philadelphia Charge	2
1	Atlanta Beat	3

Founders Cup
2	Bay Area CyberRays	3 (4)
1	Atlanta Beat	3 (2)

=== Semi-finals ===
August 18, 2001 Semi-Finals	New York Power	2–3	Bay Area CyberRays	San Jose, California
1:30 pm PDT	Janss 5'; Lalor 45'	Report	Murray 4', 82'; Chastain 40' (pen.)	Stadium: Spartan Stadium; Attendance: 7,756; Referee: Kari Seitz

August 18, 2001 Semi-Finals	Philadelphia Charge	2–3 (a.e.t.)	Atlanta Beat	Atlanta, Georgia
6:45 pm EDT	Smith 33'; Clemens 36'	Report	Sun 67' (pen.); Parlow 79', 101'	Stadium: Bobby Dodd Stadium; Attendance: 12,138; Referee: Ricardo Salazar

=== Founders Cup ===
August 25, 2001 Founders Cup	Bay Area CyberRays	3–3 (a.e.t.) (4–2 p)	Atlanta Beat	Boston, Massachusetts
2:00 pm EDT	Chastain 6'; Murray 43'; Venturini 86'	Report	Bivens 11'; Hooper 14'; Sun Wen 83'	Stadium: Foxboro Stadium; Attendance: 21,078; Referee: Sandra Hunt
	Penalties
	Venturini (penalty scored); Dorn (penalty scored); Kátia (penalty scored); Murray (penalty scored)		(penalty missed) Sun Wen; (penalty scored) Serlenga; (penalty missed) Hooper; (penalty scored) Blalack

== Awards ==
Award	Player	Club
Most Valuable Player	(United States) Tiffeny Milbrett	New York Power
Offensive Player of the Year	(United States) Tiffeny Milbrett	New York Power
Defensive Player of the Year	(Germany) Doris Fitschen	Philadelphia Charge
Goalkeeper of the Year	(United States) LaKeysia Beene	Bay Area CyberRays
Coach of the Year	(England) Ian Sawyers	Bay Area CyberRays
Humanitarian Award	(United States) Kate Sobrero	Boston Breakers
Team Community Service Award		Washington Freedom
Team Fair Play Award		New York Power

== Statistical leaders ==
=== Top scorers ===
Rank	Player	Nation	Club	Goals
1	Tiffeny Milbrett	USA	New York Power	16
2	Charmaine Hooper	CAN	Atlanta Beat	12
2	Shannon MacMillan	USA	San Diego Spirit	12
4	Dagny Mellgren	NOR	Boston Breakers	11
5	Liu Ailing	PRC	Philadelphia Charge	10
6	Julie Murray	AUS	Bay Area CyberRays	9
6	Danielle Fotopoulos	USA	Carolina Courage	9
8	Maren Meinert	GER	Boston Breakers	8
9	Kátia	BRA	Bay Area CyberRays	7
10	Hege Riise	NOR	Carolina Courage	8
10	Mia Hamm	USA	Washington Spirit	8

=== Top assists ===
Rank	Player	Nation	Club	Assists
1	Kristine Lilly	USA	Boston Breakers	10
1	Sissi	BRA	Bay Area CyberRays	10
3	Hege Riise	NOR	Carolina Courage	8
4	Maren Meinert	GER	Boston Breakers	7
4	Cindy Parlow	USA	Atlanta Beat	7
4	Julie Foudy	USA	San Diego Spirit	7
7	Shannon MacMillan	USA	San Diego Spirit	6
8	Margaret Tietjen	USA	San Diego Spirit	5
8	Kylie Bivens	USA	Atlanta Beat	5
8	Brandi Chastain	USA	Bay Area CyberRays	5
8	Michelle French	USA	Washington Spirit	5
8	Nel Fettig	USA	New York Power	5
8	Danielle Fotopoulos	USA	Carolina Courage	5
8	Sara Whalen	USA	New York Power	5

== See also ==
- List of WUSA drafts
