= Bryn Blalack =

American soccer player

Personal information
- Date of birth: June 6, 1976 (age 50)
- Place of birth: Dallas, Texas
- Height: 5 ft 4 in (1.63 m)
- Position: Forward

College career
Years	Team	Apps	(Gls)
1994–1997	Texas A&M Aggies		

Senior career*
Years	Team	Apps	(Gls)
2001	Atlanta Beat	4	(0)
- * Club domestic league appearances and goals

Bryn Blalack is a retired American soccer player.

== Career ==
She played for the Atlanta Beat.

== Personal life ==
She married baseball player Ryan Rupe.
