= Brandi Chastain =

American soccer player (born 1968)

- Chastain in 2026

Personal information
- Full name: Brandi Denise Chastain
- Date of birth: July 21, 1968 (age 58)
- Place of birth: San Jose, California, U.S.
- Height: 5 ft 7 in (1.70 m)
- Positions: Defender; midfielder; forward

College career
Years	Team	Apps	(Gls)
1986	California Golden Bears		(15)
1989–1990	Santa Clara Broncos		(32)

Senior career*
Years	Team	Apps	(Gls)
1993	Shiroki FC Serena		
2001–2003	San Jose CyberRays	52	(7)
2009	FC Gold Pride		
2010	California Storm		

International career^{‡}
1988–2004	United States	192	(30)
Medal record
Women's football (soccer)
Representing the United States
Olympic Games
Gold medal – first place	1996 Atlanta	Team competition
Gold medal – first place	2004 Athens	Team competition
Silver medal – second place	2000 Sydney	Team competition
FIFA Women's World Cup
Gold medal – first place	1991 China	Team competition
Gold medal – first place	1999 USA	Team competition
Bronze medal – third place	2003 USA	Team competition
- * Club domestic league appearances and goals as of October 14, 2009 ‡ National team caps and goals as of October 14, 2009

Brandi Denise Chastain (born July 21, 1968) is an American retired soccer player, two-time FIFA Women's World Cup champion, two-time Olympic gold-medalist, coach, sports broadcaster, and co-founder of Bay FC, the professional soccer club representing the Bay Area in the National Women's Soccer League. She played for the United States national team from 1988 to 2004. In her 192 caps on the team, she scored 30 goals playing primarily in the defender and midfielder positions. She scored a World Cup–winning penalty shootout goal against China in the 1999 FIFA Women's World Cup final. In 2023, Brandi co-founded Bay FC alongside fellow former USWNT and professional club players Leslie Osborne, Danielle Slaton, and Aly Wagner.

Chastain played professionally for Shiroki FC in the Japan Women's Football League, the San Jose CyberRays of the Women's United Soccer Association, FC Gold Pride of Women's Professional Soccer, and California Storm of Women's Premier Soccer League.

Chastain was named to the USWNT All-Time Best XI in 2013. In March 2017, she was inducted into the National Soccer Hall of Fame. In 2018 she was inducted into the Bay Area Sports Hall of Fame.

== Early life ==
Chastain was born and raised in San Jose, California and began playing soccer at the age of eight. Because there was no girls' soccer team at Davis Intermediate School, she played for the boys' soccer team after a successful tryout. Chastain attended Archbishop Mitty High School and helped lead the team to three consecutive Central Coast Section championships.

== Playing career ==
=== Collegiate ===
==== California Golden Bears, 1986 ====
Chastain attended University of California, Berkeley where she played as a forward for the Golden Bears and scored 15 goals as a freshman. Following her first and only year with the Bears, she was named All-American and earned Freshman Player Of The Year honors by Soccer America. Soon after, she underwent reconstructive anterior cruciate ligament (ACL) surgeries on both knees which caused her to miss the 1987 and 1988 seasons.

==== Santa Clara Broncos, 1989–1990 ====
After transferring to Santa Clara University ahead of the 1989 season, Chastain helped lead the Broncos to two consecutive Final Four NCAA College Cup appearances (for the first time ever) in 1989 and 1990. Chastain scored ten goals for the Broncos during the regular season. In 1990, she was a national scoring leader with 22 goals (50 points) and helped the Broncos to a 18–1–1 record. The same year, she was named the ISAA Player of the Year. She also won the Honda Sports Award as the nation's top soccer player. She graduated from SCU with a degree in communications in 1991.

=== International ===
Of her 192 international career caps, Chastain played 89 primarily as a defender but occasionally as a midfielder. On June 1, 1988, she earned her first cap for the United States women's national soccer team during a match against Japan. She scored her first international goal on April 18, 1991. After coming in as a substitute forward, she scored five consecutive goals in the team's 12–0 win against Mexico during the 1991 CONCACAF Women's Championship.

==== 1991 FIFA Women's World Cup ====
The U.S. went on to win the inaugural 1991 FIFA Women's World Cup in China.

==== 1995 FIFA Women's World Cup ====
Chastain was not called for the 1995 FIFA Women's World Cup in Sweden, in which the U.S. won the bronze medal.

==== 1996 Summer Olympics ====
Playing as a defender, Chastain competed with the national team at the 1996 Women's Olympic Football Tournament in Atlanta, the first Olympic tournament to include women's soccer. She played every minute of the U.S.' games despite suffering a third serious knee injury during the semifinal against Norway. The Americans won the gold medal after defeating China 2–1 in the final.

==== 1999 FIFA Women's World Cup ====
In the quarter-finals of the 1999 FIFA Women's World Cup, Chastain scored an own goal in the fifth minute for Germany. However, she redeemed herself by scoring the second equalizing goal for the U.S. in the 49th minute, finishing a corner kick that was taken by Mia Hamm. The match ended with a 3–2 win for the U.S. to advance to the semi-finals against Brazil, which they won 2–0. Later, Chastain, who had missed a penalty kick in the Algarve Cup against China months earlier, scored the deciding penalty against the same opponent in the final, clinching the World Cup title for the U.S. in the Rose Bowl, Pasadena. Chastain celebrated by removing her shirt, exposing her sports bra. This led to both praise and criticism from spectators and sports commentators, and the image of the celebration is considered a key symbol of women's athletics worldwide.

=== Club ===
==== Shiroki FC, 1993 ====
In 1993, Chastain played club soccer for one season in Japan's L.League for Shiroki FC. She earned team most valuable player (MVP) honors and was the only foreigner to be named one of the league's top 11 players.

==== San Jose CyberRays, 2001–2003 ====
Following the success of the 1999 FIFA Women's Cup, Chastain was a founding player in the Women's United Soccer Association, the first professional women's soccer league in the United States. She played for the San Jose CyberRays all three years of the league's existence. During the league's inaugural season, she helped the team finish second in the regular season with a 11–6–4 record securing a berth to the playoffs. The team eventually won the league's championship title after defeating the Atlanta Beat in penalty kicks. Chastain started in all 19 games in which she played during the regular season, scored 2 goals, and provided 5 assists. During the playoffs, she started in both games and scored two goals.

The CyberRays finished in fifth place during the 2002 season with a 8–8–5 record. Chastain started in all 18 games in which she played, scored 4 goals, and provided 3 assists. During the 2003 season, Chastain started in all 15 games as a defender, scored 1 goal, and provided 4 assists. San Jose finished in sixth place during the regular season with a 7–10–4 record.

==== FC Gold Pride, 2009 ====
In 2009 at age 40, Chastain played as a midfielder for FC Gold Pride in Women's Professional Soccer (WPS), the second professional women's soccer league in the United States. She was selected in the seventh round of the 2009 WPS Draft. She started in five of the ten games in which she played. The Pride finished in last place during the regular season with a 4–10–6 record. Chastain was released by the team in February 2010.

==== Coaching ====
In 2014, Chastain started coaching soccer at Bellarmine College Preparatory where she assisted the head coach. In 2018, she assisted in leading Bellarmine to their first CCS open division championship title.

=== Career statistics ===
==== International ====
Nation	Year	International Appearances				
Nation	Year	Apps	Starts	Minutes	Goals	Assists
United States	1988	2	0	87	0	0
United States	1991	13	4	546	7	1
United States	1993	2	0	84	0	1
United States	1996	23	23	1,961	2	7
United States	1997	15	15	1,319	2	2
United States	1998	24	22	1,891	5	4
United States	1999	27	21	2,035	5	5
United States	2000	34	32	2,520	4	3
United States	2001	3	3	250	0	0
United States	2002	15	14	1,061	4	0
United States	2003	14	13	1,080	1	1
United States	2004	20	13	1,149	0	2
Career Total	12	192	160	13,983	30	26

==== Clubs ====
Team	Season	League	Regular Season				
Team	Season	League	Apps	Starts	Minutes	Goals	Assists
FC Gold Pride	2009	WPS	10	5	450	0	0
California Storm	2010	WPSL	5	–	–	3	5
Career Total		–	15	5	450	3	5

== In popular culture ==
Chastain talking about the importance of equal pay regarding the U.S. women's national soccer team pay discrimination claim in 2019

=== Goal celebration ===
On July 10, 1999, at the 1999 FIFA Women's World Cup Final at the Rose Bowl in Pasadena, California, after scoring the fifth kick in the penalty shootout to give the United States the championship, and the win over China in the final game, Chastain celebrated by spontaneously taking off her jersey and falling to her knees in a sports bra, her fists clenched, flexing her arms. Removing a jersey in celebration of a goal is so common in men's soccer that it has, at times, been cause for an automatic yellow card caution, according to the Laws of the Game. The image of her celebration was described in The New York Times as the "most iconic photograph ever taken of a female athlete", and it has been considered one of the more famous photographs of a woman celebrating an athletic victory. Chastain described the celebration as "momentary insanity, nothing more, nothing less. I wasn't thinking about anything. I thought, 'This is the greatest moment of my life on the soccer field.'"

In 2019, her celebration was commemorated with a bronze statue by Brian Hanlon outside the stadium where it occurred.

In the UEFA Women's Euro 2022 Final at Wembley Stadium, England striker Chloe Kelly celebrated her 110th-minute goal against Germany in the same way. Like Chastain, Kelly's goal was a match and tournament winner – in Kelly's case, securing not only the Lionesses' first ever major trophy but the first England senior team major trophy (men's or women's) since the men's team won the 1966 World Cup as hosts. Chastain acknowledged and congratulated Kelly, saying it put "a big smile on my face" and jokingly telling her to "enjoy the free rounds of pints and dinners for the rest of [her] life" from England fans. Chastain and Kelly later also swapped shirts after the United States' friendly against England at Wembley that October.

=== Television and film ===
Chastain has been featured on numerous television shows including The Late Late Show with Craig Kilborn, The Tonight Show with Jay Leno, Late Show with David Letterman, and Good Morning America. In February 2001, Chastain appeared on an episode of Celebrity Jeopardy! and won with one dollar. The children's cancer research organization that she played for received $15,000. In 2007, Chastain appeared in the HBO documentary Dare to Dream: The Story of the U.S. Women's Soccer Team. The 44-minute film Brandi Chastain: A Tribute to a Champion was broadcast on Fox Soccer in December 2010 and focused on Chastain's testimonial game that occurred in October of the same year.

Chastain appeared as Candy in the season 6 premiere of Fresh Off the Boat, an episode which also included her World Cup–winning goal in 1999.

=== Magazines and books ===
Following the 1999 World Cup, photos of Chastain's goal celebration were featured on the covers of Sports Illustrated, Time, and Newsweek as well as numerous newspapers around the world. In 2015, the Sports Illustrated cover was voted as the second most iconic cover in the history of the magazine. The same year, she posed nude except for soccer cleats and a strategically placed soccer ball for Gear magazine. In November 2008, she was featured in Runner's World.

In 2005, Chastain's book It's Not About the Bra: Play Hard, Play Fair, and Put the Fun Back Into Competitive Sports (ISBN 006076600X) was published by HarperCollins.

=== Endorsements ===
Following the 1999 FIFA Women's World Cup, Chastain signed a number of endorsement deals, including Nike. She was the official spokesperson for Pfizer's (legacy Wyeth) multivitamin product Centrum Ultra. In July 2016, she partnered with pharmaceutical company AbbVie Inc. to promote education and awareness about inflammatory bowel disease (IBD). In 1999, she was featured on the Wheaties box. She has appeared in television commercials for Nike, Bud Light, and Gatorade.

== Broadcasting career ==
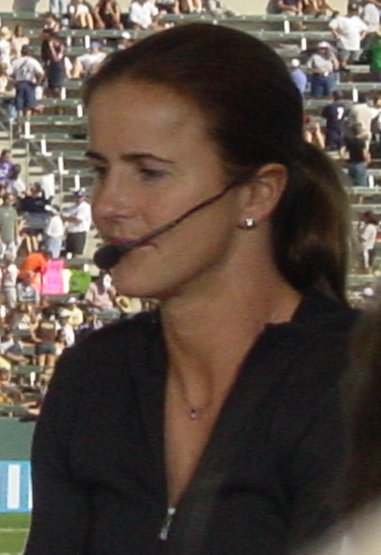
Chastain in 2003

Chastain has worked as a color commentator for soccer matches on two networks. She broadcast for NBC Sports during the 2008 and 2012 Summer Olympics. Her work with ABC/ESPN has included Major League Soccer matches and being part of a rotation of studio commentators for the 2011 FIFA Women's World Cup.

== Personal life ==
Chastain married Santa Clara Broncos head coach Jerry Smith on June 9, 1996. Their son was born in June 2006. She is stepmother to Smith's older son, Cameron. In March 2016, Chastain announced that she would donate her brain after death for concussion research. On December 10, 2019, Chastain was inducted into the California Hall of Fame.

== See also ==
- List of FIFA Women's World Cup winning players
- List of Olympic medalists in football
- List of 1996 Summer Olympics medal winners
- List of 2000 Summer Olympics medal winners
- List of 2004 Summer Olympics medal winners
- List of FC Gold Pride players
- List of MLS Cup broadcasters
- List of athletes on Wheaties boxes
- USWNT All-Time Best XI
