= Kylie Bivens =

American soccer player (born 1978)

Personal information
- Full name: Kylie Elizabeth Bivens
- Date of birth: October 24, 1978 (age 48)
- Place of birth: Upland, California, U.S.
- Height: 5 ft 5 in (1.65 m)
- Positions: Defender; midfielder

College career
| Years | Team | Apps | (Gls) |
| 1996–1999 | Santa Clara Broncos | | |

Senior career*
| Years | Team | Apps | (Gls) |
- California Storm
| 2001–2003 | Atlanta Beat | 55 | (4) |

International career
| 2002–2004 | United States | 17 | (0) |
- * Club domestic league appearances and goals

Kylie Elizabeth Bivens (born October 24, 1978) is an American former professional soccer player who featured as a defender and midfielder and was a member of the United States women's national soccer team. She represented the United States at the 2003 FIFA Women's World Cup.

== Early life and education ==
Bivens, a native of Claremont, California, attended Santa Clara University where she featured on the women's soccer team.

== Career ==
Before joining the Women's United Soccer Association, Bivens played for the California Storm. She was selected in the second round of the 2000 WUSA Draft by the Atlanta Beat as the 16th overall selection.

== Career statistics ==
=== Club ===
These statistics are incomplete and currently represent a portion of Bivens's career.

Appearances and goals by club, season and competition
| Club | Season | League | | | Other | | Total | |
| Club | Season | Division | Apps | Goals | Apps | Goals | Apps | Goals |
|---|---|---|---|---|---|---|---|---|
| Atlanta Beat | 2001 | WUSA | 19 | 2 | 2 | 1 | 21 | 3 |
| Atlanta Beat | 2002 | WUSA | 18 | 1 | 1 | 0 | 19 | 1 |
| Atlanta Beat | 2003 | WUSA | 18 | 1 | 2 | 0 | 20 | 1 |
| Atlanta Beat | Atlanta Beat total | | 55 | 4 | 5 | 1 | 60 | 5 |
| Career total | | | 55 | 4 | 5 | 1 | 60 | 5 |
