= Charmaine Hooper =

Canadian soccer player (born 1968)

Personal information
- Full name: Charmaine Elizabeth Hooper
- Date of birth: January 15, 1968 (age 58)
- Place of birth: Georgetown, Guyana
- Height: 1.70 m (5 ft 7 in)
- Position: Striker

College career
Years	Team	Apps	(Gls)
1987–1990	NC State Wolfpack	89	(58)

Senior career*
Years	Team	Apps	(Gls)
1993	FK Donn	13	(17)
1993–1994	Lazio		
1994–1998	Prima Ham FC Kunoichi		
1995–1996	Rockford Dactyls		
1998–2000	Chicago Cobras		
2001–2003	Atlanta Beat	59	(34)
2004	Chicago Cobras	4	(1)
2006	New Jersey Wildcats	3	(4)
2008	Fort Worth FC		

International career
1986–2006	Canada	129	(71)
- * Club domestic league appearances and goals

Charmaine Elizabeth Hooper (born January 15, 1968) is a Canadian retired soccer player. A four-time winner of the Canadian Players of the Year award and member of the Canada Soccer Hall of Fame, Hooper played on the Canada women's national soccer team from 1986 to 2006. As a forward, she stood as Canada's record holder for the women's national team for appearances and goals scored when she retired. Hooper competed in three FIFA Women's World Cup tournaments: 1995 in Sweden, 1999, and 2003 in the United States. At club level, Hooper played professionally in Norway, Italy, Japan, and the United States.

== Early life and education ==
Hooper was born on January 15, 1968, in Georgetown, Guyana. She and her family moved to Zambia when Hooper was 6 years old, then later to Ottawa when she was 9. She attended J. S. Woodsworth Secondary School, then later North Carolina State University.

While at NCSU, Hooper was a student-athlete on the NC State Wolfpack women's soccer team. She set the record for most points in a season, most goals in a season, most points in a career, and most goals in a career. The team was Atlantic Coast Conference champions in 1988, made it to the NCAA quarterfinals in 1987 and 1990, the semifinals in 1989, and the final in 1988. She made 89 appearances and scored 58 goals for the Wolfpack and graduated with a degree in food science. Following her career, she was inducted into the NC State Athletic Hall of Fame in 2014.

== Club career ==
In 1993, Hooper played for FK Donn of the Norwegian Toppserien. She scored 17 goals in 13 league appearances. After a short period with Lazio of Serie A, Hooper signed a professional contract with Japanese L. League club Prima Ham FC Kunoichi. She was a highly valued player in Japan and returned to North America after four seasons: "There was nothing more to gain in Japan. I had won just about every award there. Plus there was the distance."

She returned to the United States and played for the Rockford Dactyls and the Chicago Cobras of the USL W-League. She was inducted into the inaugural class of the United Soccer League's Hall of Fame in 2002.

When the Women's United Soccer Association (WUSA) professional league was being put together in America, Hooper signed a letter of intent but had concerns over the salary structure. Hooper was selected by the Atlanta Beat in the 2000 WUSA foreign player allocation and played for the team for all three seasons of the WUSA's existence, including the championship matches in 2001 and 2003.

She returned to the W-League Cobras in 2004, then played in the same league for the New Jersey Wildcats in 2006. In 2008, she played for the Fort Worth FC of the Women's Premier Soccer League (WPSL), her final season of club competition.

== International career ==
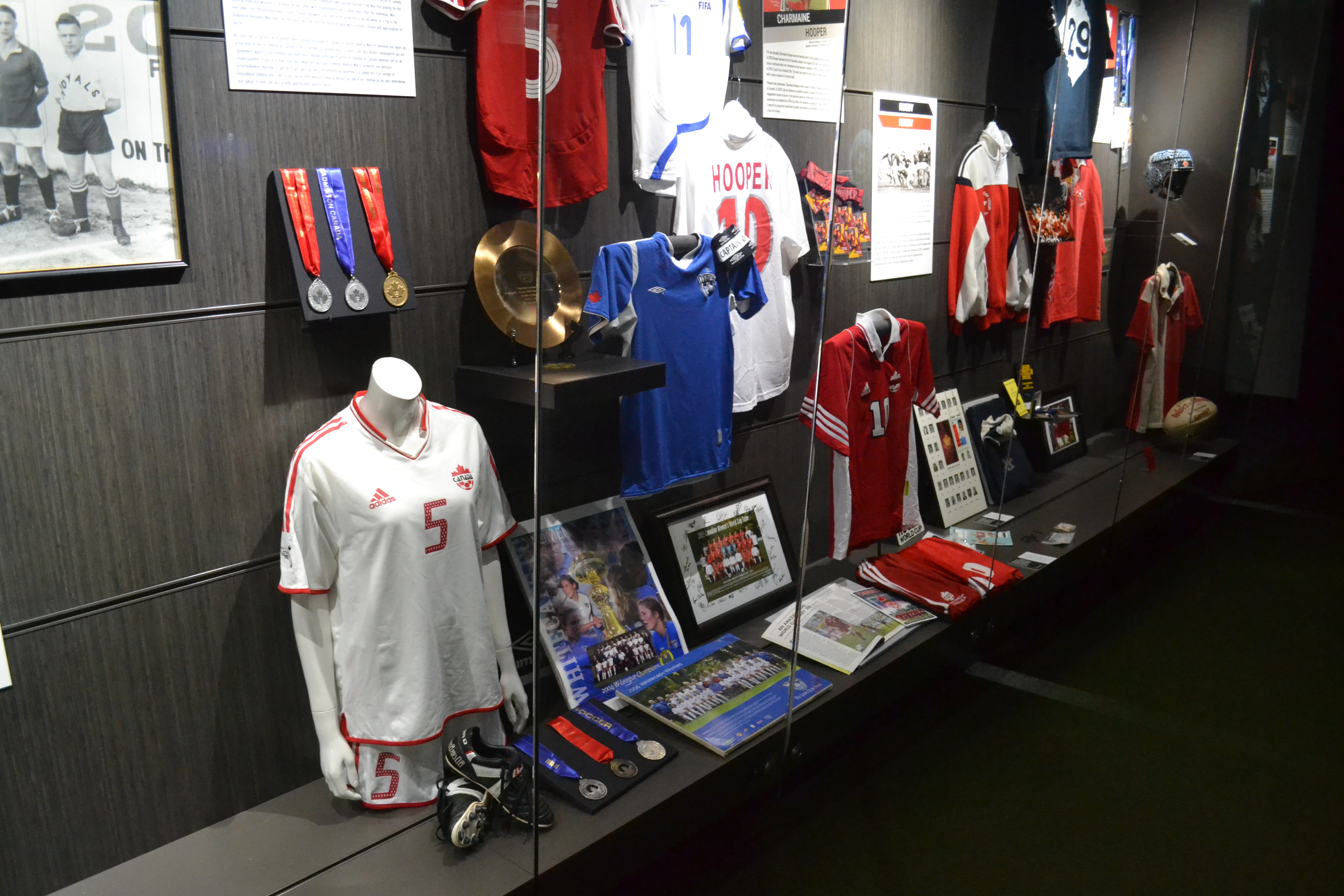
Charmaine Hooper display at Canada's Sports Hall of Fame

Hooper made 128 appearances and scored 71 goals for Canada, at one time both national records. Her international debut came on July 7, 1986 against the United States. She represented Canada at three FIFA Women's World Cups (Sweden 1995, USA 1999 and USA 2003).

In August 2006 Hooper and Christine Latham refused to attend two exhibition games against China and fell into dispute with team coach Even Pellerud. Along with a third disgruntled player, Sharolta Nonen, they publicly called for Pellerud's removal. Alleging he had pressured them to break their club contracts in order to join Vancouver Whitecaps and had tried to fix the outcome of a USL W-League play-off by releasing certain national team players but not others. Pellerud suspended the players and terminated their funding. In June 2007 an arbitrator ruled in favor of the coach. Hooper's replacement as captain Christine Sinclair strongly criticized the players' actions: "They let down their teammates and since then have done nothing to rectify it. I wouldn't want them as teammates."

Hooper was inducted into the Canadian Soccer Hall of Fame in June 2012. The same year in October she was inducted into Canada's Sports Hall of Fame in Calgary.

== International goals ==
No.	Date	Venue	Opponent	Score	Result	Competition
1.	16 April 1991	Port-au-Prince, Haiti	Costa Rica	2–0	6–0	1991 CONCACAF Women's Championship
2.	16 April 1991	Port-au-Prince, Haiti	Costa Rica	4–0	6–0	1991 CONCACAF Women's Championship
3.	18 April 1991	Port-au-Prince, Haiti	Jamaica	2–0	9–0	1991 CONCACAF Women's Championship
4.	18 April 1991	Port-au-Prince, Haiti	Jamaica	4–0	9–0	1991 CONCACAF Women's Championship
5.	18 April 1991	Port-au-Prince, Haiti	Jamaica	5–0	9–0	1991 CONCACAF Women's Championship
6.	18 April 1991	Port-au-Prince, Haiti	Jamaica	6–0	9–0	1991 CONCACAF Women's Championship
7.	21 April 1991	Port-au-Prince, Haiti	Haiti	1–0	2–0	1991 CONCACAF Women's Championship
8.	4 August 1993	New Hyde Park, United States	Trinidad and Tobago	4–0	4–0	1993 CONCACAF Women's Championship
9.	12 April 1994	Milford, Trinidad and Tobago	Trinidad and Tobago	2–0	2–0	Friendly
10.	14 April 1994	San Fernando, Trinidad and Tobago	United States	1–?	1–4	Friendly
11.	27 July 1994	Montreal, Canada	Germany	1–0	1–2	Friendly
12.	5 August 1994	Montreal, Canada	Sweden	1–?	1–2	Friendly
13.	13 August 1994	Montreal, Canada	Jamaica	1–0	7–0	1994 CONCACAF Women's Championship
14.	13 August 1994	Montreal, Canada	Jamaica	5–0	7–0	1994 CONCACAF Women's Championship
15.	13 August 1994	Montreal, Canada	Jamaica	6–0	7–0	1994 CONCACAF Women's Championship
16.	15 August 1994	Montreal, Canada	Mexico	3–0	6–0	1994 CONCACAF Women's Championship
17.	19 August 1994	Montreal, Canada	Trinidad and Tobago	4–0	5–0	1994 CONCACAF Women's Championship
18.	19 August 1994	Montreal, Canada	Trinidad and Tobago	5–0	5–0	1994 CONCACAF Women's Championship
19.	28 August 1998	Toronto, Canada	Puerto Rico	7–0	21–0	1998 CONCACAF Women's Championship
16.	28 August 1998	Toronto, Canada	Puerto Rico	11–0	21–0	1998 CONCACAF Women's Championship
17.	30 August 1998	Toronto, Canada	Martinique	3–0	14–0	1998 CONCACAF Women's Championship
18.	1 September 1998	Toronto, Canada	Guatemala	1–0	4–0	1998 CONCACAF Women's Championship
19.	4 September 1998	Toronto, Canada	Costa Rica	1–0	2–0	1998 CONCACAF Women's Championship
20.	4 September 1998	Toronto, Canada	Costa Rica	2–0	2–0	1998 CONCACAF Women's Championship
21.	23 June 1999	Landover, United States	Norway	1–1	1–7	1999 FIFA Women's World Cup
22.	26 June 1999	East Rutherford, United States	Russia	1–2	1–4	1999 FIFA Women's World Cup
23.	24 June 2000	Foxborough, United States	Mexico	4–3	4–3	2000 CONCACAF Women's Gold Cup
24.	26 June 2000	Hershey, United States	China	1–2	2–3	2000 CONCACAF Women's Gold Cup
25.	26 June 2000	Hershey, United States	China	2–3	2–3	2000 CONCACAF Women's Gold Cup
26.	28 June 2000	Louisville, United States	Guatemala	7–0	12–0	2000 CONCACAF Women's Gold Cup
27.	28 June 2000	Louisville, United States	Guatemala	9–0	12–0	2000 CONCACAF Women's Gold Cup
28.	1 July 2000	Louisville, United States	United States	1–3	1–4	2000 CONCACAF Women's Gold Cup
29.	3 July 2000	Foxborough, United States	China	1–1	1–2	2000 CONCACAF Women's Gold Cup
30.	11 March 2001	Lagos, Portugal	United States	1–0	3–0	2001 Algarve Cup
31.	11 March 2001	Lagos, Portugal	United States	3–0	3–0	2001 Algarve Cup
32.	3 October 2002	Vancouver, Canada	Haiti	1–0	11–1	2002 CONCACAF Women's Gold Cup
33.	3 October 2002	Vancouver, Canada	Haiti	4–1	11–1	2002 CONCACAF Women's Gold Cup
34.	3 October 2002	Vancouver, Canada	Haiti	6–1	11–1	2002 CONCACAF Women's Gold Cup
35.	1 November 2002	Vancouver, Canada	Jamaica	2–0	9–0	2002 CONCACAF Women's Gold Cup
36.	3 November 2002	Vancouver, Canada	Costa Rica	1–0	3–0	2002 CONCACAF Women's Gold Cup
37.	3 November 2002	Vancouver, Canada	Costa Rica	2–0	3–0	2002 CONCACAF Women's Gold Cup
38.	9 November 2002	Pasadena, United States	United States	1–1	1–2 (a.e.t.)	2002 CONCACAF Women's Gold Cup
39.	24 September 2003	Columbus, United States	Argentina	1–0	3–0	2003 FIFA Women's World Cup
40.	2 October 2003	Portland, United States	China	1–0	1–0	2003 FIFA Women's World Cup
41.	26 February 2004	Heredia, Costa Rica	Jamaica	2–0	6–0	2004 CONCACAF Women's Pre-Olympic Tournament
42.	5 March 2004	Heredia, Costa Rica	Costa Rica	2–0	4–0	2004 CONCACAF Women's Pre-Olympic Tournament
65.	23 February 2006	Aguascalientes, Mexico	Mexico	2–1	3–1	Friendly
66.	4 March 2006	Vancouver, Canada	Netherlands	1–0	3–1	Friendly
67.	4 March 2006	Vancouver, Canada	Netherlands	2–0	3–1	Friendly
68.	25 June 2006	Toronto, Canada	Italy	2–0	2–1	Friendly
69.	18 July 2006	Blaine, United States	Sweden	1–?	4–2	Friendly
70.	18 July 2006	Blaine, United States	Sweden	2–?	4–2	Friendly
71.	18 July 2006	Blaine, United States	Sweden	4–1	4–2	Friendly

== Personal life ==
She is the sister of Lyndon Hooper, also a former Canadian soccer player, and Ian Hooper, the Director of Business Operations for the Ottawa Champions Baseball Club. She is from Nepean, Ontario. She married Chuck Codd in 2002, a former University soccer coach. They have a daughter.

In 2014, she and her husband were featured on the show Fixer Upper as they selected and renovated their home, which ultimately became a child care center and eventually an Airbnb.

== Career statistics ==
=== Club ===
These statistics are incomplete and currently represent a portion of Hooper's career.

Appearances and goals by club, season and competition
Club	Season	League			Other		Total	
Club	Season	Division	Apps	Goals	Apps	Goals	Apps	Goals
FK Donn	1993	1. divisjon	13	17	0	0	13	17
FK Donn	FK Donn total		13	17	0	0	13	17
Atlanta Beat	2001	WUSA	19	12	2	1	21	13
Atlanta Beat	2002	WUSA	19	11	1	0	20	11
Atlanta Beat	2003	WUSA	21	11	2	2	23	13
Atlanta Beat	Atlanta Beat total		59	34	5	3	64	37
Chicago Cobras	2004	USL W-League	4	1	0	0	4	1
Chicago Cobras	Chicago Cobras total		4	1	0	0	4	1
New Jersey Wildcats	2006	USL W-League	3	4	0	0	3	4
New Jersey Wildcats	New Jersey Wildcats total		3	4	0	0	3	4
Career total			79	56	5	3	84	59

== See also ==
- List of women's footballers with 100 or more international caps
