= San Jose CyberRays =

Women's United Soccer Association franchise

- Full name: San Jose CyberRays
- Nicknames: Bay Area CyberRays; CyberRays
- Founded: 2000
- Dissolved: 2003
- Stadium: Spartan Stadium
- Capacity: 30,456
- Owner: WUSA
- League: Women's United Soccer Association
- 2003: 6th
Home colors	Away colors

The San Jose CyberRays were a professional soccer team that played in the Women's United Soccer Association. The team played at Spartan Stadium on the South Campus of San José State University in San Jose, California. Stars included U.S. National Team star Brandi Chastain, WUSA Goalkeeper of the Year LaKeysia Beene, and leading scorer Julie Murray. Other memorable CyberRays were Brazilians Sissi and Katia, Tisha Venturini (from the U.S. National Team), and "ironwoman" Thori Bryan, who played every minute of the first season. They were coached by Ian Sawyers, who received WUSA Coach of the Year honors in 2001.

== History ==
=== Establishment ===
The CyberRays were founded in 2000 as a member of the Women's United Soccer Association, the first professional women's soccer league in the United States. The league featured many of the stars from the 1999 FIFA Women's World Cup. The team featured United States women's national team players and league founding players Brandi Chastain, Tisha Venturini and LaKeysia Beene.

== Year-by-year ==
Year	League	Regular season	Playoffs	Avg. attendance	Total attendance
2001	WUSA	2nd place	1st place	7,692	76,922
2002	WUSA	5th place	did not qualify	7,167	78,836
2003	WUSA	6th place	did not qualify	6,791	67,912

=== Inaugural season ===
The team won the WUSA title (known as the Founders Cup) for the league's inaugural season in 2001. The CyberRays triumphed over the Atlanta Beat, in a 4–2 shootout after double overtime of a 3–3 game. It was the only year in the country's history that both a women's and men's professional soccer team won championship titles in the same city.

=== 2002 ===
In 2002 the team changed its name from the Bay Area CyberRays to the San Jose CyberRays, and also gave their roster a facelift, allowing Murray to retire and trading for Pretinha from the Washington Freedom, who along with Katia and Sissi, gave the new attack a decidedly Brazilian flavor. The bold changes didn't have the desired effect, however, and the team finished out of the playoffs. One bright spot was the emergence of Katia, who scored 15 goals and broke Tiffeny Milbrett's record for most points in a season.

=== 2003 ===
The CyberRays had high hopes for 2003, but an anemic offense (worst in the league in goals scored) hurt the team all year. The team remained in contention until the end of the season, but finished out of the playoffs for a second straight year.

But even bigger problems were brewing in the background, as the WUSA continued to struggle financially. The CyberRays folded on September 15, 2003, when the league announced it was suspending operations.

== Stadium ==
The CyberRays played at Spartan Stadium on the South Campus of San Jose State University in San Jose, California. The stadium was used for the 1999 FIFA Women's World Cup and was also the home of the San Jose Earthquakes of Major League Soccer from 1996 to 2005. At the time, the stadium featured a grass pitch and up to 30,456 capacity.

== Broadcasting ==
In 2002, games were broadcast on television via PAX TV. California Bears assistant coach Jennifer Thomas provided color commentary while KCBS Radio sports announcer Hal Ramey was the play-by-play announcer. A number of league games were broadcast on Turner Sports and CNN/Sports Illustrated.

== See also ==
- Women's Professional Soccer
- National Women's Soccer League
