= Tisha Venturini =

American soccer player (born 1973)

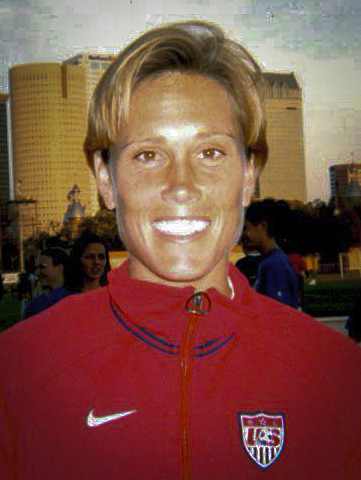

Personal information
- Full name: Tisha Lea Venturini-Hoch
- Birth name: Tisha Lea Venturini
- Date of birth: March 3, 1973 (age 53)
- Place of birth: Modesto, California, U.S.
- Height: 5 ft 6 in (1.68 m)
- Position: Midfielder

College career
Years	Team	Apps	(Gls)
1991–1994	North Carolina Tar Heels		

Senior career*
Years	Team	Apps	(Gls)
- San Jose CyberRays
1998	Delaware Genies		
- Bay Area CyberRays

International career
1992–2000	United States	134	(47)
Medal record
Women's football (soccer)
Representing the United States
Olympic Games
Gold medal – first place	1996 Atlanta	Team competition
World Cup
Gold medal – first place	1999 USA	Team competition
Bronze medal – third place	1995 Sweden	Team competition
- * Club domestic league appearances and goals

Tisha Lea Venturini-Hoch (née Venturini; born March 3, 1973) is a former American soccer player and current National Spokesperson for Produce for Better Health. She is a gold medalist in the 1996 Atlanta Olympics, and a world champion in the 1999 FIFA Women's World Cup.

In 2024, she was inducted into the National Soccer Hall of Fame.

== Early life and youth career ==
She was born in Modesto, California and attended Grace M. Davis High School.

She attended University of North Carolina, and played for the Tar Heels women's soccer team. As a Tar Heels team member, she was NCAA Champion in 1991, 1992, 1993 and 1994. She won the Honda Sports Award as the nation's top soccer player in 1995.

== Club career ==
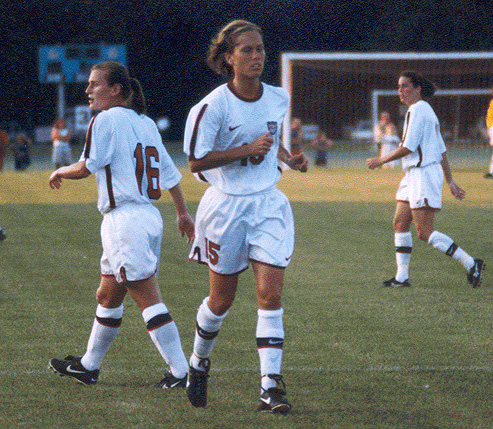
Venturini (center) along with Tiffeny Milbrett (left) in St. Louis 1998

Venturini played professional soccer in the W-League for San Jose CyberRays, Delaware Genies and Bay Area CyberRays.

Venturini is the only athlete in any sport to ever hold all five titles as
1) a Collegiate Champion at University of North Carolina,
2) a four-time NCAA National Champion at University of North Carolina,
3) a World Cup Champion in 1999,
4) an Olympic Gold Medalist in 1996,
5) a Professional Champion at Bay Area CyberRays in 2001.

== International career ==
During her career, Venturini represented the United States in 132 matches, and scored 44 goals. She was awarded a gold medal at the 1996 Summer Olympics in Atlanta, and was a World Champion at the 1999 FIFA Women's World Cup.

In two FIFA Women's World Cups (Sweden 1995 and USA 1999) and one Olympics (Atlanta 1996), Venturini played 13 matches and scored 7 goals.

== Coaching career ==
Venturini partnered with former national team players Mia Hamm and Kristine Lilly to develop the TeamFirst Soccer Academy. TeamFirst conducts youth soccer camps throughout the United States.

She is an assistant coach at Newport Harbor High School in Newport Beach, CA, where her daughter, Sadie, played.

== Personal life ==
Venturini likes to ski, read, and play cards. She is a part of the ownership group of Angel City FC of the National Women's Soccer League. Her son, Cooper, is a wide receiver on the San Jose State Spartans football team.

== Career statistics ==
=== International goals ===
No.	Date	Venue	Opponent	Score	Result	Competition	Ref.
1.	6 June 1995	Strömvallen, Gävle, Sweden	China	1–0	3–3	1995 FIFA Women's World Cup	
2.	13 June 1995	Strömvallen, Gävle, Sweden	Japan	4–0	4–0	1995 FIFA Women's World Cup	
3.	17 June 1995	Strömvallen, Gävle, Sweden	China	1–0	2–0	1995 FIFA Women's World Cup	
4.	21 July 1996	Citrus Bowl, Orlando, United States	Denmark	1–0	3–0	1996 Summer Olympics	
5.	23 July 1996	Citrus Bowl, Orlando, United States	Sweden	1–0	2–1	1996 Summer Olympics	
6.	27 June 1999	Foxboro Stadium, Foxborough, United States	North Korea	2–0	3–0	1999 FIFA Women's World Cup	
7.	27 June 1999	Foxboro Stadium, Foxborough, United States	North Korea	3–0	3–0	1999 FIFA Women's World Cup	
