= Atlanta Beat (WUSA) =

- Full name: Atlanta Beat
- Nickname: Beat
- Founded: 2001
- Dissolved: 2003
- Stadium: Bobby Dodd Stadium (2001); Herndon Stadium (2002–2003)
- Capacity: 15,000
- Owner: Cox Enterprises
- General Manager: Lynn Morgan
- Head Coach: Tom Stone
- League: Women's United Soccer Association

The Atlanta Beat was a professional soccer team that played in the Women's United Soccer Association. The team played at Bobby Dodd Stadium on the campus of the Georgia Institute of Technology in its first year of operation before moving to Herndon Stadium, on the campus of Morris Brown College in Atlanta, Georgia.

== History ==
The team began play in 2001, and reached the playoffs in each of the WUSA's three seasons — the only team in the league to do so. They advanced to the Founders Cup in both 2001 and 2003, losing on both occasions.

The Beat's "founding players" were Briana Scurry, Cindy Parlow, and Nikki Serlenga of the USA women's national team. The Beat had the #1 pick in the inaugural WUSA draft, and selected China's Sun Wen, star of the 1999 FIFA Women's World Cup. Their first goal was scored by Japan star midfielder Homare Sawa.

The coach of the Atlanta Beat was Tom Stone.

== League Suspension ==
The WUSA announced on September 15, 2003, that it was suspending operations. Several former Beat players went on to play for the Atlanta Silverbacks Women in the W-League, and five – Briana Scurry, Sharolta Nonen, Homare Sawa, Nancy Augustyniak, and Ifeoma Dieke—played in Women's Professional Soccer.

It was announced on October 7, 2009, that a newly formed version of the Atlanta Beat would be joining WPS. On June 17, 2009, the new Atlanta Beat announced that Shawn McGee would be the General Manager of the recently reformed team.

== Players (All-Time Roster) ==
#	Name	Position	Day of Birth	Height	Hometown	College
3	Emily Burt	F	April 25, 1975	5' 8"	Menlo Park, California	Stanford University
33	Callie Withers	M	May 29, 1981	5' 8"	Palo Alto, California	Stanford University
22	Ifeoma Dieke	D	February 25, 1981	5' 7"	Glasgow, Scotland	Florida International University
15	Julie Augustyniak	D	February 1, 1979	5' 5"	Peachtree City, GA	Clemson University
29	Leslie Gaston	D	August 9, 1980	5' 5"	Montgomery, AL	University of North Carolina
25	Nancy Augustyniak	D	February 1, 1979	5' 5"	Peachtree City, GA	Clemson University
6	Sharolta Nonen	D	December 30, 1977	5' 6"	Vancouver, BC, Canada	University of Nebraska–Lincoln
11	Abby Crumpton	F	April 6, 1981	5' 6"	Rochester Hills, MI	University of Michigan
10	Charmaine Hooper	F	January 15, 1968	5' 7"	Ottawa, ON, Canada	North Carolina State University
12	Cindy Parlow	F	May 8, 1978	5' 11"	Memphis, TN	University of North Carolina
13	Maribel Dominguez	F	November 18, 1978	5' 4"	Mexico City, Mexico	
9	Sun Wen	F	April 6, 1973	5' 5"	Shanghai, China	Fudan University
1	Briana Scurry	GK	September 7, 1971	5' 8"	Dayton, MN	University of Massachusetts Amherst
24	Melanie Wilson	GK	October 5, 1978	5' 9"	Memphis, TN	Texas A&M University
18	Aleisha Rose	M	July 28, 1982	5' 10"		Brigham Young University
8	Homare Sawa	M	September 6, 1978	5' 4"	Tokyo, Japan	
19	Kristin Warren	M	December 17, 1980	5' 7"	Littleton, CO	University of Denver
4	Kylie Bivens	M	October 24, 1978	5' 5"	Upland, CA	Santa Clara University
16	Marci Miller	M	December 4, 1975	5' 7"	St. Charles, IL	Southern Methodist University
	Nicky Thrasher	F		5' 6"	El Paso, TX	Texas A&M University
2	Wendy Dillinger	D	December 9, 1974	5' 7"	St. Charles, MO	Indiana University
5	Nikki Serlenga	M	June 20, 1978	5' 5"		Santa Clara University
21	Lisa Krzykowski	M	September 10, 1976	5' 7"	Cedarburg, WI	University of Wisconsin–Milwaukee

== See also ==
- Women's professional sports
- List of soccer clubs in the United States
- Women's association football
