= 2000 WUSA draft =

The 2000 WUSA draft, the Women's United Soccer Association's inaugural player draft held before their initial 2001 season, distributed players to the league's eight inaugural teams. The draft occurred on December 10 and 11, 2000. This took place after each team was allocated three national team players and two foreign players.

== Round 1 ==
Pick	Player	WUSA team	Previous team	College
1	Sun Wen (F)	Atlanta Beat	China WNT	
2	Liu Ailing (M)	Philadelphia Charge	China WNT	
3	Fan Yunjie (D)	San Diego Spirit	China WNT	
4	Gao Hong (GK)	New York Power	China WNT	
5	Dagny Mellgren (M)	Boston Breakers	Bjørnar	
6	Wen Lirong (D)	Carolina Courage	China WNT	
7	Anne Mäkinen (M)	Washington Freedom		Notre Dame
8	Thori Staples Bryan (D)	Bay Area CyberRays	Raleigh Wings	North Carolina State

1. First American pick.

== Round 2 ==
Pick	Player	WUSA team	Previous team	College
9	Julie Murray (F)	Bay Area CyberRays	NSW Sapphires	
10	Lindsay Stoecker (D)	Washington Freedom		North Carolina
11	Meredith Florance (F)	Carolina Courage		North Carolina
12	Keri Sanchez Raygor (D)	Boston Breakers	Silicon Valley Red Devils	North Carolina
13	Jennifer Lalor (M)	New York Power	San Diego WFC	Santa Clara
14	Sherrill Kester (F)	San Diego Spirit	Raleigh Wings	Duke
15	Heather Mitts (D)	Philadelphia Charge	Tampa Bay Extreme	Florida
16	Kylie Bivens (D)	Atlanta Beat	North Texas Heat	Santa Clara

== Round 3 ==
Pick	Player	WUSA team	Previous team	College
17	Sharolta Nonen (D)	Atlanta Beat		Nebraska–Lincoln
18	Jenny Benson (M)	Philadelphia Charge		Nebraska–Lincoln
19	Shannon Boxx (M)	San Diego Spirit	Ajax America Women	Notre Dame
20	Kristy Whelchel (D)	New York Power	Raleigh Wings	Duke
21	Karina LeBlanc (GK)	Boston Breakers		Nebraska–Lincoln
22	Nicole Roberts (M)	Carolina Courage	Raleigh Wings	North Carolina
23	Krista Davey (M)	Washington Freedom	Chicago Cobras	North Texas
24	Amy Walsh (D)	Bay Area CyberRays		Nebraska–Lincoln

== Round 4 ==
Pick	Player	WUSA team	Previous team	College
25	Ann Cook (M)	Bay Area CyberRays	Chicago Cobras	William & Mary
26	Skylar Little (D)	Washington Freedom		UCLA
27	Erin Baxter (M)	Carolina Courage	Tampa Bay Extreme	Florida
28	Heather Aldama (D)	Boston Breakers		Santa Clara
29	Beth Zotter (F)	New York Power		Harvard
30	Jen Mascaro (M)	San Diego Spirit		Notre Dame
31	Ruth Van't Land (F)	Philadelphia Charge		Cal Poly Pomona
32	Marci Miller (M)	Atlanta Beat	Chicago Cobras	SMU
32	Kimberly Pickup (D)	San Diego Spirit	Boston Renegades	Santa Clara

1. San Diego got an additional "compensation pick" because Joy Fawcett, one of their allocated players, was pregnant.

== Round 5 ==
Pick	Player	WUSA team	Previous team	College
33	Nancy Augustyniak (D)	Atlanta Beat	Atlanta Classics	Clemson
34	Sarah Yohe (F)	Philadelphia Charge		Florida
35	Gina Oceguera (D/F)	San Diego Spirit	California Storm	Cal Poly
36	Nel Fettig (D)	New York Power	Raleigh Wings	North Carolina
37	Robin Confer (F)	Boston Breakers	New Jersey Lady Stallions	North Carolina
38	Naomi Stone (M)	Carolina Courage	New Hampshire Lady Phantoms	UConn
39	Emmy Barr (F)	Washington Freedom	California Storm	Santa Clara
40	Carey Dorn (D)	Bay Area CyberRays	Long Island Lady Riders	UConn

== Round 6 ==
Pick	Player	WUSA team	Previous team	College
41	Jacqui Little (M)	Bay Area CyberRays		Santa Clara
42	Amanda Cromwell (M)	Washington Freedom	Charlotte Lady Eagles	Virginia
43	Kim Yankowski (M)	Carolina Courage	Raleigh Wings	North Carolina State
44	Elie Foster (M)	Boston Breakers	Foothill FC	Stanford
45	Jennifer O'Sullivan (D)	New York Power		Stanford
46	Kerry Gragg (M)	Atlanta Beat	Atlanta Classics	UNC Greensboro
47	Raven McDonald (M)	Philadelphia Charge		North Carolina
48	Jaime Pagliarulo (GK)	San Diego Spirit	Maryland Pride	George Mason

1. Traded from the San Diego Spirit for a 6th round pick and a 2nd round pick in the February 2001 supplemental draft. Soccer America noted that this trade apparently disrupted the subsequent order of the draft.

== Round 7 ==
Pick	Player	WUSA team	Previous team	College
49	Rebekah McDowell (M)	Philadelphia Charge	Charlotte Lady Eagles	North Carolina
50	Traci Arkenberg-Gatell (F)	San Diego Spirit	Ajax America Women	UCLA
51	Carlene Stenson (F)	New York Power	Tampa Bay Extreme	South Florida
52	Sarah Powell (D)	Boston Breakers	Boston Renegades	Boston College
53	Maren Hendershot (F)	Carolina Courage	Utah Spiders	Brigham Young
54	Monica Gerardo (M)	Washington Freedom	Ajax America Women	Notre Dame
55	Jennifer Mead (GK)	Bay Area CyberRays	Boston Renegades	George Mason
56	Lisa Krzykowski (M)	Atlanta Beat	Chicago Cobras	Wisconsin–Milwaukee

== Round 8 ==
Pick	Player	WUSA team	Previous team	College
57	Kim Clark (M)	Bay Area CyberRays	Ajax America Women	Southern California
58	Erin Fahey (GK)	Washington Freedom	Portland Rain	Portland
59	Staci Burt (M)	Carolina Courage	Chicago Cobras	Utah
60	Allie Kemp (F)	Boston Breakers	San Diego WFC	UC Berkeley
61	Kerry Connors (F)	New York Power	Boston Renegades	UConn
62	Missy Wycinsky (M)	San Diego Spirit	Maryland Pride	William & Mary
63	Michelle Demko (M)	Philadelphia Charge	Tampa Bay Extreme	Maryland
64	Julie Augustyniak (D)	Atlanta Beat	Atlanta Classics	Clemson

== Round 9 ==
Pick	Player	WUSA team	Previous team	College
65	Melanie Wilson (GK)	Atlanta Beat		Texas A&M
66	Kalli Kamholz (M)	Philadelphia Charge	Tampa Bay Extreme	North Carolina
67	Margaret Tietjen (M)	San Diego Spirit	Long Island Lady Riders	UConn
68	Erica Iverson (D)	New York Power	Boston Renegades	Massachusetts
69	Kim Stiles (D)	Boston Breakers		Portland
70	Mikka Hansen (F)	Carolina Courage	Fortuna Hjørring	Santa Clara
71	Tracey Milburn (F)	Washington Freedom		UCLA
72	Theresa Wagner (M)	Bay Area CyberRays		Washington

== Round 10 ==
Pick	Player	WUSA team	Previous team	College
73	Lisa Náñez (D)	Bay Area CyberRays	California Storm	Santa Clara
74	Justi Baumgardt (M)	Washington Freedom	California Storm	Portland
75	Kristin Luckenbill (GK)	Carolina Courage		Dartmouth
76	Ally Wagner (F)	Boston Breakers		Wisconsin
77	Tammy Pearman (F)	New York Power	Maryland Pride	George Mason
78	Kara Brown (D)	San Diego Spirit	Boston Renegades	Notre Dame
79	Carly Smolak (GK)	Philadelphia Charge		Stanford
80	Kelly Cagle (M)	Atlanta Beat	Raleigh Wings	Duke

== Round 11 ==
Pick	Player	WUSA team	Previous team	College
81	Mary Pitera (D)	Atlanta Beat	Maryland Pride	North Carolina State
82	Jennifer Tietjen (M)	Philadelphia Charge	Long Island Lady Riders	UConn
83	Tara Koleski (F)	San Diego Spirit	California Storm	Portland
84	Ronnie Fair (M)	New York Power	Boston Renegades	Stanford
85	Sherice Bartling (F)	Boston Breakers	San Diego WFC	San Diego
86	Sarah Dacey (M)	Carolina Courage	Boston Renegades	North Carolina
87	Stephanie Loehr (D)	Washington Freedom	Maryland Pride	William & Mary
88	Venus James (M)	Bay Area CyberRays		UCLA

== Round 12 ==
Pick	Player	WUSA team	Previous team	College
89	Megan Horvath (M)	Bay Area CyberRays	Silicon Valley Red Devils	Santa Clara
90	Amy Gray (M)	Washington Freedom	Atlanta Classics	Clemson
91	Ásthildur Helgadóttir (M)	Carolina Courage	Breiðablik	Vanderbilt
92	Angela Hucles (F)	Boston Breakers	Hampton Roads Piranhas	Virginia
93	Jessica Reifer (F)	New York Power	FC Malters	Hartford
94	Erin Martinez-Montoya (M)	San Diego Spirit	California Storm	Santa Clara
95	Erin Martin (F)	Philadelphia Charge	Three Kings United	Stanford
96	Emily Burt (F)	Atlanta Beat	Foothill FC	Stanford

== Round 13 ==
Pick	Player	WUSA team	Previous team	College
97	Bryn Blalack (F)	Atlanta Beat	North Texas Heat	Texas A&M
98	Beth Keller (F)	Philadelphia Charge	Chicago Cobras	Clemson
99	Jennifer Babel (D)	San Diego Spirit	Ajax America Women	Azusa Pacific
100	Emily Janss (D)	New York Power	Maryland Pride	Maryland
101	Lindsay Eddleman (F)	Boston Breakers	Denver Diamonds	Nebraska–Lincoln
102	Staci Wilson (D)	Carolina Courage	Raleigh Wings	North Carolina
103	Keri Sarver (F)	Washington Freedom	Maryland Pride	Maryland
104	Christina Bell (D)	Bay Area CyberRays	California Storm	Fresno State

== Round 14 ==
Pick	Player	WUSA team	Previous team	College
105	Linda Kurtyka (M)	Bay Area CyberRays	Foothill FC	North Carolina State
106	Carrie Moore (D)	Washington Freedom	Hampton Roads Piranhas	William & Mary
107	Jessica Post (F)	Carolina Courage		Dartmouth
108	Lindsay Massengale (D)	Boston Breakers	California Storm	Clemson
109	Rebecca Hornbacher (GK)	New York Power		Nebraska–Lincoln
110	Trudi Sharpsteen (M)	San Diego Spirit	Ajax America Women	UC Berkeley
111	Laurie Schwoy (M)	Philadelphia Charge		North Carolina
112	Kimberly Engesser (F)	Atlanta Beat		Nebraska–Lincoln

== Round 15 ==
Pick	Player	WUSA team	Previous team	College
113	Dayna Smith (D)	Atlanta Beat	Denver Diamonds	Santa Clara
114	Laurie Hill (M)	Philadelphia Charge	California Storm	UC Santa Barbara
115	Melissa Ribaudo-Cavitt (D)	San Diego Spirit	California Storm	Portland
116	Melissa McBean (F)	New York Power	Boston Renegades	Portland
117	Jennifer Tissue (M)	Boston Breakers	San Francisco Nighthawks	Whitworth
118	Silvana Burtini (F)	Carolina Courage	Raleigh Wings	Capilano
119	Louise Lieberman (M)	Washington Freedom	Ajax America Women	UCLA
120	Carmel Murphy (M)	Bay Area CyberRays	Foothill FC	Stanford

== Draft notes ==
The draft was preceded by an invitation-only combine held over five days at Florida Atlantic University. Although over 500 players applied, only 198 were invited to take part in supervised training and scrimmages. Around 40 of the players had previously been competing in the pro–am Women's Premier Soccer League (WPSL), while most of the others were competing at W-League level.

The draft assigned the rights of 15 players to each team. Teams could contract up to five of the players immediately, to start promotional work in their home cities. WUSA's vice president of legal affairs, Rob Kaler, had decided the draft order by randomly selecting envelopes containing each team's logo in a lottery.

In November 2000, WUSA's vice president of player relations, Lauren Gregg, secured five Chinese players after flying to China for delicate negotiations with a somewhat reluctant Chinese Football Association (CFA) and the players' clubs. All five players went into the draft and were selected with five of the first six picks. Top pick Sun Wen was in Rome on the second day of the draft, collecting her award as joint-FIFA Female Player of the Century.

Gregg had traversed the globe since May 2000, trying to sign elite players identified by WUSA commissioner Tony DiCicco. She was not always successful: Norway's Marianne Pettersen accepted a competing offer from Europe's only professional club Fulham, while FFC Frankfurt blocked an approach for their German–American defender Steffi Jones.

American players who had found success overseas, including Colette Cunningham, Denise Reddy and Jill Rutten, reportedly attended the combine but were not selected in the draft. Brazilian goalkeeper Andréia Suntaque and Dutch midfielder Nathalie Geeris were also in attendance but not picked. Each team was restricted to four foreign players, including the two already allocated by the league.

As well as foreign players and combine attendees, college players in their senior year were eligible for the main draft, although a further supplemental draft – specifically for college players – was arranged for February 2001.

Many players, who were typically graduates from leading Universities, faced a substantial drop in salary, even if they made it on to a team's final 20-player roster. A collective bargaining agreement between the players and league allowed a minimum annual wage of $25,000, beneath an average salary of $40,000. After some deliberation, last pick Carmel Murphy decided not to take up her place at Bay Area CyberRays, in favor of going to medical school.

== See also ==
- List of top-division football clubs in CONCACAF countries
- List of professional sports teams in the United States and Canada
- List of WUSA drafts
- 2001 WUSA season
