= Nel Fettig =

Retired American soccer player

Personal information
- Full name: Nelwyn Elizabeth Fettig Hayes
- Date of birth: April 25, 1976 (age 50)
- Place of birth: Fort Wayne, Indiana, United States
- Height: 5 ft 4 in (1.63 m)
- Position: Defender

College career
Years	Team	Apps	(Gls)
1994–1997	North Carolina Tar Heels	102	(7)

Senior career*
Years	Team	Apps	(Gls)
1998–2000	Raleigh Wings		
2001–2002	New York Power	21	(2)
2002–2003	Carolina Courage	42	(2)
2004	Carolina Dynamo	2	(0)
2005–2006	Atlanta Silverbacks	16	(2)

International career
1993	United States U20		
- * Club domestic league appearances and goals

Nelwyn Elizabeth Fettig Hayes (born April 25, 1976, in Fort Wayne, Indiana) is a retired American soccer player who played for the Carolina Courage.

== Early life and education ==
Fettig was born in Fort Wayne, Indiana on April 25, 1976. She attended Bishop Luers High School, where she excelled in both soccer and tennis, being named the National High School Player of the Year in 1994. She graduated as class valedictorian, then received an undergraduate degree in psychology and exercise science from the University of North Carolina. While there, she received various honors as a student-athlete, including a postgraduate scholarship from the National Collegiate Athletic Association (NCAA), which she used to attend the University of North Carolina School of Law.

== Athletic career ==
=== Before university ===
Fettig began her athletic career young, competing internationally before graduating from high school. In 1993, she competed at the U.S. Olympic Festival held in San Antonio, as well as on the United States women's national under-20 soccer team.

=== University ===
While studying at the University of North Carolina, Fettig played for the university's soccer team. She was an All-American from 1995 to 1997, and during her tenure, the team won three National Collegiate Athletic Association (NCAA) titles. In 1996, she was named the NCAA Tournament's Defensive MVP. In her senior year, she served as the team captain.

=== Professional and semi-professional ===
From 1998 to 2000, Fettig played semi-professionally in the W-League with the Raleigh Wings, where she served as team captain. During her tenure, the team won two national championships. She was also named the W-League Defender of the Year in 1998, 1999, and 2000.

Fettig made her professional debut with the Women's United Soccer Association (WUSA) in 2001, having been drafted to play for the New York Power. She played in the 2002 WUSA All-Star Game and won the 2002 WUSA Founders Cup. She transferred to play with the Carolina Courage the following season. WUSA collapsed in 2003.

In April 2004, Fettig signed for Carolina Dynamo. She made two appearances for the club in the 2004 USL W-League season. She joined newly-formed Atlanta Silverbacks Women in March 2005. She played five times in 2005 and 11 times in 2006, scoring once in each season. She did not play in 2007 after giving birth to her daughter, Lily Katherine.

=== Coaching ===
Fettig was an assistant coach at Northwestern University for the 1998 season. She returned to the position in 2003.

== Honors ==
In 2008, Fettig was inducted into the Indiana Soccer Hall of Fame.
