= Sherrill Kester =

American soccer player (born 1978)

Personal information
- Full name: Sherrill Kester Dempsey
- Birth name: Sherrill Lyles Kester
- Date of birth: March 7, 1978 (age 48)
- Place of birth: High Point, North Carolina, United States
- Height: 5 ft 3 in (1.60 m)
- Position: Midfielder

Youth career
- 1989–1999: PSA Stars

College career
Years	Team	Apps	(Gls)
1996–1999	Duke Blue Devils	87	(35)

Senior career*
Years	Team	Apps	(Gls)
2000	Raleigh Wings		
2001–2002	San Diego Spirit	40	(1)

International career^{‡}
2000	United States	3	(3)
- * Club domestic league appearances and goals as of 14:37, 2 May 2016 (UTC) ‡ National team caps and goals as of 14:37, 2 May 2016 (UTC)

Sherrill Kester Dempsey (born Sherrill Lyles Kester; March 7, 1978) is an American former professional soccer player. A midfielder, she represented the San Diego Spirit of Women's United Soccer Association (WUSA) and won three caps for the United States national team.

== Club career ==
Kester played for USL W-League team Raleigh Wings in 2000. She was the San Diego Spirit's second round draft pick, ahead of the inaugural 2001 season of the Women's United Soccer Association (WUSA). In the league's first two seasons, Kester featured in 40 of the Spirit's 42 regular season games, contributing one goal and two assists. She was sent to the New York Power in September 2002, as part of a five-player trade.

Having got married in the off-season, Kester refused to go to New York. She informed team management that she would only play in WUSA if it was for the Carolina Courage, near her North Carolina–based husband. Another trade saw her rights revert to San Diego, before she was waived. Kester trained with the Courage in 2003 pre-season, but was released from the reduced 16-player roster before the season started.

== International career ==
In January 2000 Kester was part of an understrength United States national team selected for the Australia Cup, while the team's regular players were in a contract dispute with the United States Soccer Federation (USSF). She scored twice in the first match, an 8–1 win over the Czech Republic, becoming the second player (after Cindy Parlow Cone in 1996) to score two goals on debut for the USWNT. She featured in the other tournament matches versus Sweden and hosts Australia, finishing with three goals in her three caps.
