= 2001 WUSA supplemental draft =

The WUSA supplemental player draft, held before Women's United Soccer Association's initial 2001 season, distributed college players to the league's eight inaugural teams. The draft occurred on February 4, 2001. This took place after each team had already been allocated three national team players, two foreign players and had each made 15 selections from the main draft held on December 10 and 11, 2000.

== Round 1 ==
Pick	Player	Pos.	WUSA team	College
1	Kelly Lindsey	DF	Bay Area CyberRays	Notre Dame Fighting Irish
2	Jennifer Grubb	DF	Washington Freedom	Notre Dame Fighting Irish
3	Staci Reynolds	DF	Carolina Courage	BYU Cougars
4	Tina August	DF	Boston Breakers	San Diego State Aztecs
5	Katie Tracy	MF	New York Power	Virginia Cavaliers
6	Karissa Hampton	DF	San Diego Spirit	UCLA Bruins
7	Courtney Saunders	FW	Philadelphia Charge	Baylor Bears
8	Maite Zabala	GK	Atlanta Beat	California Golden Bears

== Round 2 ==
Pick	Player	Pos.	WUSA team	College
1	Sara Streufert	FW	San Diego Spirit	Gonzaga Bulldogs
2	Deidre Enos	FW	Philadelphia Charge	Boston University Terriers
3	Holly Broome	DF	San Diego Spirit	SMU Mustangs
4	Vanessa Rubio	DF	New York Power	North Carolina Tar Heels
5	Meotis Erikson	FW	Boston Breakers	Notre Dame Fighting Irish
6	Jaclyn Raveia	DF	Carolina Courage	Richmond Spiders
7	Dawn Greathouse	GK	Washington Freedom	Baylor Bears
8	Amber Reynolds	DF	Bay Area CyberRays	Texas A&M Aggies

1. The Atlanta Beat had traded its second round pick in this draft to the San Diego Spirit for Kerry Gragg as the sixth round selection in the main draft.

== Round 3 ==
Pick	Player	Pos.	WUSA team	College
1	Lauren Molinaro	MF	Bay Area CyberRays	UConn Huskies
2	Kacy Beitel	MF	Washington Freedom	Michigan Wolverines
3	Megan Jeidy	MF	Carolina Courage	NC State Wolfpack
4	Becky Hogan	MF	Boston Breakers	Nebraska Cornhuskers
5	Rachel Hoffman	FW	New York Power	Penn State Nittany Lions
6	Erica Strey	FW	San Diego Spirit	Wisconsin Badgers
7	Jennifer Soileau	MF	Philadelphia Charge	Ole Miss Rebels
8	Melissa Roth	FW	Atlanta Beat	Dartmouth Big Green

== Round 4 ==
Pick	Player	Pos.	WUSA team	College
1	Nicole Lamb	MF	Atlanta Beat	SMU Mustangs
2	Laurie Pells	GK	Philadelphia Charge	Georgian Court College
3	Nicole Williams	GK	New York Power	Georgia Bulldogs
4	Chrissy McCann	DF/MF	Boston Breakers	UConn Huskies
5	Fanta Cooper	DF	Carolina Courage	Milwaukee Panthers
6	Jackie Mynarski	DF	Washington Freedom	Maryland Terrapins
7	Tami Pivnick	DF	Bay Area CyberRays	California Golden Bears
8	Laurie Black	DF	Atlanta Beat	Vanderbilt Commodores

1. Atlanta Beat got San Diego Spirit's fourth round pick as a result of the earlier trade involving Kerry Gragg.

== Draft notes ==
The supplemental draft was preceded by a two-day tournament at Lockhart Stadium, Fort Lauderdale, Florida, sponsored by Umbro and intended to bring together the best seniors in college soccer.

It was intended that the supplemental draft would facilitate: "selection of players who just completed their college eligibility or who recently submitted their names into the draft pool". After it had taken place, each team had four additional players on a provisional roster of 24. This would be cut down to 20 before the season began.

Draft host Tony DiCicco reminded disappointed candidates who were not selected that each team would still hold open try-outs before their rosters were finalized: "the process is not over". He said that an agreement on WUSA's formal affiliation with the USL W-League and Women's Premier Soccer League was close.

== See also ==
- List of top-division football clubs in CONCACAF countries
- List of professional sports teams in the United States and Canada
- List of WUSA drafts
- 2001 WUSA season
