= 2000 NCAA Division I women's soccer tournament =

2000 NCAA women's soccer tournament
Women's College Cup (semifinals & final)

Tournament details
- Country: United States
- Dates: November–December 2000
- Teams: 48

Final positions
- Champions: North Carolina Tar Heels (16th title, 19th College Cup)
- Runners-up: UCLA Bruins (1st title match, 1st College Cup)
- Semifinalists: Notre Dame Fighting Irish (6th College Cup); Portland Pilots (5th College Cup)

Tournament statistics
- Matches played: 47
- Goals scored: 155 (3.3 per match)
- Attendance: 53,051 (1,129 per match)
- Top goal scorer(s): Meredith Florance, UNC (4G, 1A)

Awards
- Best player: Meredith Florance, UNC (Offensive); Catherine Reddick, UNC (Defensive)

The 2000 NCAA Division I women's soccer tournament (also known as the 2000 Women's College Cup) was the 19th annual single-elimination tournament to determine the national champion of NCAA Division I women's collegiate soccer. The semifinals and championship game were played at Spartan Stadium in San Jose, California during December 2000.

North Carolina defeated UCLA in the final, 2–1, to win their sixteenth, and second straight, national title. The Tar Heels (21–3) were coached by Anson Dorrance.

The most outstanding offensive player was Meredith Florance from North Carolina, and the most outstanding defensive player was Catherine Reddick, also from North Carolina. Florance and Reddick, along with eleven other players, were named to the All-Tournament team. Florance was also the tournament's leading scorer (4 goals).

== Qualification ==
All Division I women's soccer programs were eligible to qualify for the tournament. The tournament field remained fixed at 48 teams although it would expand to its current size, 64 teams, the following year.

=== Format ===
Just as before, the final two rounds, deemed the Women's College Cup were played at a pre-determined neutral site. All other rounds were played on campus sites at the home field of the higher-seeded team. The top sixteen teams were given a bye to the Second Round while the remaining thirty-two teams played in the preliminary First Round.

=== Teams ===
Notre Dame Regional
Seed	School	Conference	Berth Type	Record
	BYU	Mountain West	Automatic	18–3–1
	Cal Poly	Big West	Automatic	11–6–1
	California	Pac-10	At-large	17–2–1
	Hartford	America East	At-large	17–3
	Harvard	Ivy League	At-large	10–7
	Miami (OH)	MAC	Automatic	13–7
	Michigan	Big Ten	At-large	12–8–1
	Notre Dame	Big East	Automatic	20–0–1
	Quinnipiac	Northeast	Automatic	13–6–1
	San Jose State	WAC	Automatic	10–12–1
	Santa Clara	West Coast	At-large	14–6–1
	Stanford	Pac-10	At-large	13–5–1

UCLA Regional
Seed	School	Conference	Berth Type	Record
	Clemson	ACC	At-large	17–2–1
	Duke	ACC	At-large	13–7–1
	Florida	SEC	Automatic	16–7
	Florida State	ACC	At-large	12–7–2
	Furman	Southern	At-large	20–2
	Jacksonville	Trans America	Automatic	19–2
	Marquette	Conference USA	Automatic	19–2–1
	San Diego	West Coast	At-large	13–6
	Texas A&M	Big 12	At-large	17–6
	UCLA	Pac-10	At-large	15–3–1
	USC	Pac-10	At-large	13–5–2
	Wright State	Midwestern Collegiate	Automatic	12–7–1

North Carolina Regional
Seed	School	Conference	Berth Type	Record
	Connecticut	Big East	At-large	15–6–2
	Liberty	Big South	Automatic	15–6
	Nebraska	Big 12	Automatic	21–1
	North Carolina	ACC	Automatic	16–3
	Princeton	Ivy League	Auto (shared)	13–4
	Richmond	CAA	At-large	12–6
	UNC Greensboro	Southern	Automatic	13–7–1
	Virginia	ACC	At-large	10–7–1
	Wake Forest	ACC	At-large	10–7–2
	West Virginia	Big East	At-large	15–5
	William & Mary	CAA	Automatic	15–5
	Wisconsin	Big Ten	At-large	15–6–1

Portland Regional
Seed	School	Conference	Berth Type	Record
	Arizona State	Pac-10	At-large	13–6–1
	Boston U.	America East	Automatic	15–6
	Dartmouth	Ivy League	Auto (shared)	13–4
	Holy Cross	Patriot	Automatic	10–10–1
	Illinois	Big Ten	At-large	13–7
	Montana	Big Sky	Automatic	15–4–1
	Penn State	Big Ten	Automatic	20–2–1
	Portland	West Coast	Automatic	15–3
	Southwest Missouri State	Missouri Valley	Automatic	12–10–1
	Washington	Pac-10	Automatic	17–2
	Washington State	Pac-10	At-large	13–6
	Xavier	Atlantic 10	Automatic	14–6–1

== Bracket ==
=== Play-in games ===
November 3
Liberty (Big South, 14–6)	1
Tennessee Tech (OVC, 12–7)	0

November 4
Quinnipiac (NEC, 12–6–1) (OT)	2
Loyola (MD) (MAAC, 15–4)	1

November 4
Montana (Big Sky, 14–4–1)	6
Northwestern State (SLC, 15–7)	0

=== Primary bracket ===
First round
Michigan (2OT)	4
Miami (OH)	3
Harvard	2
Quinnipiac	1
Stanford	4
San Jose State	1
Santa Clara	3
Cal Poly	1
Wake Forest	6
Liberty	1
UNC Greensboro (2OT)	3
William & Mary	2
Wisconsin (2OT)	1
Princeton	0
Richmond	5
West Virginia	1
Duke	3
Furman	1
Florida State	4
Jacksonville	1
Marquette (2OT)	2
Wright State	1
USC	2
San Diego	1
Illinois	2
Xavier	0
Boston U.	1
Holy Cross	0
Arizona State	2
SW Missouri State	0
Montana	1
Washington State	0

Second round
Notre Dame	3
Michigan	1
Hartford	0
Harvard	3
BYU	5
Stanford	0
California	0
Santa Clara	2
North Carolina	5
Wake Forest	0
Virginia	6
UNC Greensboro	1
Connecticut	1
Wisconsin	0
Nebraska	4
Richmond	0
Clemson (OT)	2
Duke	1
Florida	1
Florida State	2
Texas A&M	4
Marquette	0
UCLA	3
USC	0
Penn State (OT)	1
Illinois	0
Dartmouth	4
Boston U.	1
Portland	3
Arizona State	1
Washington	5
Montana	0

Third Round
Notre Dame	2
Harvard	0
BYU	1
Santa Clara (OT)	2
North Carolina	2
Virginia	1
Connecticut	1
Nebraska	0
Clemson	2
Florida State	0
Texas A&M	0
UCLA	4
Penn State	4
Dartmouth	0
Portland	1
Washington	0

Quarterfinals
Notre Dame (OT)	2
Santa Clara	1
North Carolina	3
Connecticut	0
Clemson	1
UCLA	2
Penn State	0
Portland (OT)	1

Semifinals (Women's College Cup); Spartan Stadium; San Jose, California
Notre Dame	1
North Carolina	2
UCLA	1
Portland	0

Championship (Women's College Cup); Spartan Stadium; San Jose, California
North Carolina	2
UCLA	1

== All-tournament team ==
- Daniella Borgman, North Carolina
- Meotis Erickson, Notre Dame
- Meredith Florance, North Carolina (most outstanding offensive player)
- Karissa Hampton, UCLA
- Venus James, UCLA
- Jena Kluegel, North Carolina
- Cheryl Loveless, Portland
- Lauren Orlandos, Portland
- Kim Patrick, North Carolina
- Catherine Reddick, North Carolina (most outstanding defensive player)
- Liz Wagner, Notre Dame
- Jordan Walker, North Carolina
- Amy Warner, Notre Dame

== See also ==
- 2000 NCAA Division I men's soccer tournament
- 2000 NCAA Division II women's soccer tournament
- 2000 NCAA Division III women's soccer tournament
- 2000 NAIA women's soccer tournament
