= Skylar Little =

American former soccer player

Personal information
- Full name: Skylar Martine Meinhardt
- Birth name: Skylar Martine Little
- Date of birth: March 10, 1978 (age 48)
- Place of birth: Heerlen, Netherlands
- Height: 5 ft 3 in (1.60 m)
- Position: Right-back

Youth career
- 1993–1995: Valley United
- 1996: Las Virgenes Blazers

College career
Years	Team	Apps	(Gls)
1996–1999	UCLA Bruins	84	(0)

Senior career*
Years	Team	Apps	(Gls)
2001–2003	Washington Freedom	60	(1)
- * Club domestic league appearances and goals

Skylar Martine Meinhardt (née Little; born March 10, 1978) is an American former professional soccer player. A consistent right-back, she played for Washington Freedom of Women's United Soccer Association (WUSA) and trained with the senior United States women's national soccer team.

== Playing career ==
=== College ===
Meinhardt attended the University of California, Los Angeles and played college soccer. She graduated in 1999 with a degree in sociology. With the Bruins, Meinhardt made 84 appearances (68 starts) and served five assists.

=== Club ===
Women's United Soccer Association (WUSA), the first official professional women's soccer league in the United States, began in 2001. Meinhardt was a fourth-round draft pick (26th overall in the global draft) by the Washington Freedom. In 2001 Meinhardt started 19 of her 20 regular season appearances.

In 2002 she started all 20 regular season appearances and scored one goal as the Freedom finished third. She featured in the championship game but the Freedom lost 3–2 to Carolina Courage. Freedom coach Jim Gabarra praised Meinhardt's improvement: "She is a very good one vs. one defender and one of the first names you put in your line-up."

Ahead of the 2003 WUSA season, Meinhardt had knee surgery and she spent the off-season in Chicago, volunteering in a children's hospital. Another solid and dependable campaign saw Meinhardt start all 20 regular season games and play in the 2003 WUSA Founders Cup win.

=== International ===
In December 1999 Meinhardt was called into a senior United States women's national soccer team training camp in San Diego.

== Personal life ==
Meinhardt and her identical twin Jacqui Little were born in the Netherlands, but grew up playing soccer in Pacific Palisades, Los Angeles. Jacqui, a forward, played college soccer with Santa Clara Broncos, while defender Skylar elected to stay closer to home with UCLA.

In the 1999 NCAA Division I Women's Soccer Tournament, Jacqui's Broncos team beat Skylar's Bruins 7–0. Jacqui was drafted by the Bay Area CyberRays and faced Skylar's Washington Freedom in WUSA's inaugural match, which the Freedom won 1–0.

In November 2001 Washington Freedom traded their Brazilian forward Pretinha to the CyberRays for Jacqui Little and a third round draft pick. Jacqui and Skylar were therefore team-mates on the Washington Freedom roster in 2002 and 2003.

After the collapse of WUSA, Meinhardt registered with a temp agency and did: "every odd job you could possibly imagine". She then secured a permanent role in sales for Wolf Designs in Southern California.

In 2016 she was living in Westchester, Los Angeles, had changed her surname from Little to Meinhardt and had three children.
