= Robin Confer =

American soccer player and coach (born 1976)

Personal information
- Full name: Robin Janelle Confer
- Date of birth: February 21, 1976 (age 50)
- Place of birth: Clearwater, Florida, U.S.
- Height: 5 ft 8 in (1.73 m)
- Position: Forward

Youth career
- –1994: Clearwater Central Marauders

College career
Years	Team	Apps	(Gls)
1994–1997	North Carolina Tar Heels	107	(77)

Senior career*
Years	Team	Apps	(Gls)
1998	Raleigh Wings	11	(9)
- New Jersey Lady Stallions
2001	Boston Breakers	1	(0)

International career
- United States U21
1996–1998	United States	8	(1)

Managerial career
- 1998: North Carolina Tar Heels (assistant)
- Texas A&M Aggies (assistant)
- 2002: Mississippi State Bulldogs (assistant)
- 2003–2004: Florida State Seminoles (assistant)
- 2005–2013: Georgia Bulldogs (assistant)
- 2014–2018: North Florida Ospreys
- * Club domestic league appearances and goals

Robin Janelle Confer (born February 21, 1976) is an American former soccer player who played as a forward, making eight appearances for the United States women's national team.

== Career ==
Confer played for the Clearwater Central Marauders in high school, where she scored 277 goals and was named a Parade High-School All-American. In college, she played for the North Carolina Tar Heels, helping the team to win the NCAA championship in 1994, 1996, and 1997. She was a Soccer America First-Team and NSCAA Third-Team All-American in 1997, and was chosen as a Freshman All-American in 1994 by Soccer America. The same year she was chosen by Soccer Buzz and Soccer News as the National Player of the Year, and was a finalist for the Hermann Trophy. She was included in the NCAA All-Tournament team in all four seasons, including 1997 when she was chosen as the tournament's offensive MVP. In total, she scored 77 goals and recorded 55 assists in 107 appearances for the Tar Heels. She ranks fourth in career points (goals and assists) at Carolina with 209, fifth in goals, and sixth in assists. She also holds the joint-NCAA record for most games played, along with Kristi Eveland, having never missed a game in her collegiate career.

Confer began her national career with the U.S. under-21 team, where she was a captain. She made her international debut for the United States on January 18, 1996 in a friendly match against Ukraine. In total, she made eight appearances for the U.S. and scored one goal, earning her final cap on December 16, 1998 in another friendly match against Ukraine.

In club soccer, Confer played for the Raleigh Wings in 1998, as well as the New Jersey Lady Stallions. She was selected by the Boston Breakers in the 2000 WUSA Draft, where she made one appearance during the 2001 season. However, a back injury cut her playing career short.

Confer was included in the Atlantic Coast Conference Top 50 Honorees. She later began coaching, working as the assistant for the North Carolina Tar Heels (as a volunteer), Mississippi State Bulldogs, Texas A&M Aggies, Florida State Seminoles, and Georgia Bulldogs. In 2014, she was appointed as the head coach of the North Florida Ospreys women's soccer team, where she remained until her resignation in 2018 in order to pursue opportunities outside coaching. She also has coached as part of the U.S. Youth Soccer Olympic Development Program. In 2019, Confer worked as the director of softball operations for the Georgia Bulldogs.

== Personal life ==
Confer is a native of Clearwater, Florida. She earned a bachelor's degree in exercise and sports science from the University of North Carolina at Chapel Hill in 1998.

== Career statistics ==
=== International ===
United States
Year	Apps	Goals
1996	1	0
1997	4	1
1998	3	0
Total	8	1

=== International goals ===
No.	Date	Location	Opponent	Score	Result	Competition
1	April 24, 1997	Greensboro, North Carolina, United States	France	1–0	4–2	Friendly
