= Kim Montgomery =

American soccer player (born 1972)

Personal information
- Full name: Kim Yankowski Montgomery
- Date of birth: April 27, 1972 (age 54)
- Place of birth: Huntington, New York, United States
- Positions: Forward; midfielder

College career
Years	Team	Apps	(Gls)
1990–1993	NC State Wolfpack		(32)

Senior career*
Years	Team	Apps	(Gls)
1998–2000	Raleigh Wings		
2001–2003	Carolina Courage	32	(0)
2002	New York Power		

International career
- United States U16
- United States U19
- * Club domestic league appearances and goals

Kim Yankowski Montgomery (born April 27, 1972, in Huntington, New York) is a retired American soccer player who played for Carolina Courage, as well as the under-16 and under-19 United States national soccer teams.

== Early life and education ==
Montgomery was born in Huntington, New York on April 27, 1972.

Montgomery attended Point Pleasant Borough High School, where she began playing on the varsity soccer team her freshman through senior years. Throughout all four years of high school, she also played for the school's field hockey team. In 1990, the Asbury Park Press named her the high school female athlete of the decade.

Following graduation, Montgomery received a full-ride scholarship to North Carolina State University and graduated in 1995 with a bachelor's degree in Health and Physical Education. She then continued her education at Virginia Tech, where she received a master's degree in Health and Physical Education in 1996.

== Career ==
=== Athletics ===
While in high school, Montgomery played for both the under-16 and under-19 United States national soccer teams.

Montgomery played soccer with North Carolina State University (NCSU) for four years. The team played in the National Collegiate Athletic Association (NCAA) championships all four years and reached the finals twice. She was also named one of the Atlantic Coast Conference's Top Women Soccer Players of All Time.

In 1998, Montgomery made her semi-professional debut playing in the USL W-League with the Raleigh Wings. In her first two years on the team, they won the W-League Championships. She was named the team's Most Valuable Player (MVP) in 1998. Upon the creation of the Women's United Soccer Association (WUSA) in 2000, Montgomery was drafted in the sixth round to play for the Carolina Courage. In 2002, she was traded to play for the New York Power.

=== Coaching ===
Montgomery began her coaching career while completing her master's degree at Virginia Tech, where she served as the assistant soccer coach in 1995 and 1996.

In 2012, Montgomery became the head coach of the boys' and girls' soccer teams at Ardrey Kell High School. As of 2022, she was still head coach for Ardrey Kell High School's girls' soccer team.

In 2023, The Charlotte Observer named Montgomery Coach of the Year.

== Personal life ==
As of 2022, Montgomery lived in Charlotte, North Carolina with her husband and children. She has at least two daughters, Carly and Madison, both of whom she has coached in soccer.
