= Nicole Roberts =

American soccer player

Personal information
- Full name: Nicole Anisi Roberts
- Date of birth: July 16, 1973 (age 53)
- Place of birth: Troy, New York, United States
- Height: 5 ft 5 in (1.65 m)
- Positions: Midfielder; forward

College career
| Years | Team | Apps | (Gls) |
| 1993–1995 | UMass Minutewomen | | |
| 1996 | North Carolina Tar Heels | | |

Senior career*
| Years | Team | Apps | (Gls) |
| 1994 | Boston Storm | | |
| 1998–2000 | Raleigh Wings | | |
| 2001–2002 | Carolina Courage | 3 | (0) |
- * Club domestic league appearances and goals as of 01:07, 5 November 2017 (UTC) ‡ National team caps and goals as of 01:07, 5 November 2017 (UTC)

Nicole Anisi Roberts (born July 16, 1973) is an American former professional soccer player. A midfielder or forward, she represented the Carolina Courage of Women's United Soccer Association (WUSA).

== Professional career ==
Roberts was the Carolina Courage's third round draft pick (22nd overall) ahead of the inaugural 2001 season of the Women's United Soccer Association (WUSA). She missed the entire first season with a broken leg, but was retained for the 2002 season. She made three appearances for the club, logging 65 minutes of playing time before being waived in July 2002.
