= Kristy Whelchel =

American soccer player

Personal information
- Full name: Kristy Whelchel Hartofilis
- Birth name: Kristy Lynn Whelchel
- Date of birth: June 15, 1977 (age 49)
- Place of birth: Sanford, Florida, United States
- Height: 5 ft 6 in (1.68 m)
- Position: Defender

Youth career
- Team Boca

College career
Years	Team	Apps	(Gls)
1995–1998	Duke Blue Devils		

Senior career*
Years	Team	Apps	(Gls)
1999–2000	Raleigh Wings		
1999	Fortuna Hjørring		
2001–2003	New York Power	46	(2)
- * Club domestic league appearances and goals

Kristy Whelchel Hartofilis (born Kristy Lynn Whelchel; June 15, 1977) is an American former professional soccer player. As a defender, she represented the New York Power of Women's United Soccer Association (WUSA), as well as Fortuna Hjørring of the Danish Elitedivisionen.

== Club career ==
After graduating from Duke University in 1999, Whelchel accepted an offer to play for Fortuna Hjørring in Denmark. In only her fourth game for the club she damaged ankle ligaments and returned to the United States. Whelchel played for USL W-League team Raleigh Wings in 1999 and 2000. She was the New York Power's third round draft pick (20th overall) for the inaugural 2001 season of the Women's United Soccer Association (WUSA).

In the league's first season, Whelchel started all 21 of the Power's regular season matches and scored two goals. She started 20 of the team's 21 games in 2002, serving one assist. Before the 2003 season she suffered an anterior cruciate ligament injury but recovered to start three of her five appearances. When WUSA subsequently folded, she began working as a real estate agent in Manhattan.

== International career ==
From 1995 until 1998 Whelchel was part of the United States women's national under-21 team. She participated in three editions of the Nordic Cup.

== Personal life ==
Kristy's mother Susan Whelchel is a former Mayor of Boca Raton, Florida. In 2010 Kristy and her brother Jay Whelchel launched Whelchel Partners Real Estate Services in Boca Raton. While living in New York she met her husband, el guapo Nick Hartofils. The couple have two daughters and a son.
