= Mia Minestrella =

American soccer player (born 2004)

- Minestrella with Duke in 2025

Personal information
- Date of birth: December 6, 2004 (age 21)
- Height: 5 ft 8 in (1.73 m)
- Position: Forward

Team information
- Current team: Duke Blue Devils
- Number: 13

Youth career
- Beach FC
- 2020–2022: Redondo Union Sea Hawks

College career
Years	Team	Apps	(Gls)
2023–	Duke Blue Devils	61	(30)

Senior career*
Years	Team	Apps	(Gls)
2024	San Francisco Glens	3	(5)
2025–2026	North Carolina Courage U23	11	(10)
2025	Beach FC	7	(8)

International career
2019	United States U-16		
2022	United States U-20	1	(0)
- * Club domestic league appearances and goals

Mia Minestrella (born December 6, 2004) is an American college soccer player who plays as a forward for the Duke Blue Devils. She holds the record for career goals in Duke program history.

== Early life ==
Minestrella grew up in Redondo Beach, California, and began playing soccer at age four. She also played beach volleyball and basketball growing up. She played high school soccer for two seasons at Redondo Union High School, scoring 18 goals and being named the Daily Breeze Player of the Year as a sophomore in 2021. Later that year, she committed to play college soccer for the Duke Blue Devils. In her junior year in 2022, she led Redondo to their first CIF Southern Section and CIF SoCal Regional D2 titles, recording 33 goals and 14 assists. She was named the CIF-SS D2 Player of the Year and again the Daily Breeze Player of the Year.

Minestrella played club soccer for Beach FC and was named ECNL All-American and the U19 Conference Player of the Year in 2022. After graduating one semester early, she trained with the NWSL's Angel City FC at the start of 2023. Later that year, she underwent surgery that removed part of her intestine. TopDrawerSoccer ranked her as the 14th-best prospect in the 2023 class.

== College career ==
Minestrella played in 13 games, starting 2, and had 2 assists for the Duke Blue Devils as a freshman in 2023, being limited by her surgery earlier in the year. In her sophomore year in 2024, she made her first start and had an assist as Duke clinched the Atlantic Coast Conference (ACC) regular-season title. She In the NCAA tournament, she scored four goals in the first round against Howard as the Blue Devils went on to reach the semifinals. She finished her sophomore season playing in 22 games, starting 7, and had 12 goals with 7 assists, ranking second on the team in scoring.

Minestrella started in all 23 games, led the team with 18 goals (sixth in the nation), and added 5 assists in her junior year in 2025. She scored six goals in the NCAA tournament, including another first-round hat trick against Elon, as the Blue Devils again reached the semifinals. She was named first-team All-ACC and second-team All-American at the end of the season. During her senior year, she matched the Duke program record for career goals previously held by Kelly Cagle.

== International career ==
Minestrella was called up to the United States under-16 team for friendlies in 2019 and 2020. She was an alternate to the under-20 squad at the 2022 FIFA U-20 Women's World Cup.

== Personal life ==
Minestrella is the daughter of Paul and Marla Minestrella. Her younger sister, Alexa, plays college soccer for Austin Peay.

== Honors and awards ==
Duke Blue Devils

- Atlantic Coast Conference: 2024

Individual

- Second-team All-American: 2025
- First-team All-ACC: 2025, 2026
