= Jacqui Little =

American former soccer player

Personal information
- Full name: Jacqueline Elise Little
- Date of birth: March 10, 1978 (age 48)
- Place of birth: Heerlen, Netherlands
- Height: 5 ft 3 in (1.60 m)
- Position: Forward

Youth career
- 1993–1996: Valley United

College career
Years	Team	Apps	(Gls)
1996–1999	Santa Clara Broncos		

Senior career*
Years	Team	Apps	(Gls)
2001	Bay Area CyberRays	15	(1)
2002–2003	Washington Freedom	40	(5)
- * Club domestic league appearances and goals

Jacqueline Elise Little (formerly Rimando; born March 10, 1978) is an American former professional soccer player. A fast forward, she played for Bay Area CyberRays and Washington Freedom of Women's United Soccer Association (WUSA) and trained with the senior United States women's national soccer team. She played in the WUSA championship game in all three seasons of the league's existence and won the WUSA title on two occasions with her two different clubs.

== Playing career ==
=== College ===
Little attended Santa Clara University and played college soccer. She graduated in 1999 with a degree in sociology. With the Broncos, Little reached the NCAA Division I Women's Soccer Championship Final Four in each of her seasons with the team. She was appointed to the University's Athletics Hall of Fame in 2019.

=== Club ===
Women's United Soccer Association (WUSA), the first official professional women's soccer league in the United States, began in 2001. Little was a sixth-round draft pick (41st overall in the global draft) by the Bay Area CyberRays. In 2001, Little started three of her 15 regular season appearances, contributing a goal and two assists. She made a brief appearance in the 2001 WUSA Founders Cup as the CyberRays secured the inaugural championship.

In November 2001 Washington Freedom traded their Brazilian forward Pretinha to the CyberRays for Little and a third round draft pick. In Washington, Little joined her twin Skylar Little, who was already on the Freedom roster.

In 2002, Little started 12 of her 20 regular season appearances, scoring three goals as the Freedom improved their seventh-place finish in 2001 to third in 2002. She featured in the championship game but the Freedom lost 3–2 to Carolina Courage. Freedom coach Jim Gabarra praised Little's performances as an impact substitute: "Jacqui really accepted her role of coming off the bench well and provided a spark last year."

Ahead of the 2003 WUSA season, Little kept fit in the off-season but also enjoyed some time away from soccer. Another successful campaign saw Little start 19 of 20 regular season games and play in the 2003 WUSA Founders Cup win.

=== International ===
In July 2005 Little was called into a senior United States women's national soccer team training camp in Carson, California.

== Personal life ==
Little and her identical twin Skylar Little were born in the Netherlands, but grew up playing soccer in Pacific Palisades, Los Angeles. Skylar, a defender, played college soccer with UCLA Bruins, while forward Jacqui elected to move further afield with Santa Clara.

In the 1999 NCAA Division I Women's Soccer Tournament, Jacqui's Broncos team beat Skylar's Bruins 7–0. Skylar was drafted by the Washington Freedom and faced Jacqui's Bay Area CyberRays in WUSA's inaugural match, which the Freedom won 1–0.

After the collapse of WUSA, Little took an office job with Reico Kitchen & Bath. Although she liked the job she was sad to no longer be a professional soccer player: "The fact that I was sitting at a desk instead of doing what I love to do, it just hit me like a ton of bricks."

In December 2005, Little married her longtime boyfriend, Nick Rimando. He played for the United States men's national soccer team as a goalkeeper and is also from California. The wedding was performed by Rimando's teammate Ben Olsen in Malibu, California. Rimando and Little have two children, Jett Nicholas Rimando and Benny Rose Rimando. In 2016 she was living in Salt Lake City, and has since divorced Rimando.
