= DTSD =

DTSD may refer to:

- Dennis Township School District
- Derry Township School District
