= Maite Zabala =

American soccer coach and former player

Personal information
- Full name: Miren Maite Zabala Rementeria
- Date of birth: April 7, 1979 (age 47)
- Place of birth: Boise, Idaho, United States
- Height: 5 ft 8 in (1.73 m)
- Position: Goalkeeper

College career
Years	Team	Apps	(Gls)
1997–2000	California Golden Bears		

Senior career*
Years	Team	Apps	(Gls)
2001	Atlanta Beat	0	(0)
2002	Philadelphia Charge	1	(0)
2003	Carolina Courage	3	(0)
2004	Athletic Bilbao	0	(0)
- * Club domestic league appearances and goals

Miren Maite Zabala Rementeria (born April 7, 1979) is a Basque American soccer coach and former professional goalkeeper. She played for Atlanta Beat, Philadelphia Charge and Carolina Courage of Women's United Soccer Association (WUSA).

Zabala played college soccer for the University of California, Berkeley "Golden Bears" between 1997 and 2000. She was inducted to the university's Athletics Hall of Fame in November 2011.

She was the Atlanta Beat's first round pick in the 2001 WUSA supplemental draft. In the inaugural 2001 season of the Women's United Soccer Association (WUSA), Zabala was Atlanta's unused third-choice goalkeeper behind Briana Scurry and Melanie Wilson.

After being placed on waivers by the Atlanta Beat, Zabala was signed by the Philadelphia Charge. In 2002 she primarily served as the understudy to Melissa Moore, but did play in one league match. In WUSA's final 2003 season, Zabala played three times for the Carolina Courage, as backup to Kristin "Lucky" Luckenbill.

Following the demise of WUSA, Zabala tried out for Athletic Bilbao of the Spanish Primera División in March 2004. She agreed to remain for the final five games of Athletic's 2003–04 season (becoming one of a relatively small group of players to sign for the Basque club who were not born locally), where she understudied Elixabete Capa as the Rojiblancas retained their league title.

Zabala was an assistant soccer coach at her alma mater Cal Golden Bears from 2001 to 2006, then joined the San Francisco Dons in a similar role in 2007. She was appointed assistant soccer coach by Boise State Broncos in February 2015 and then by Portland Pilots in January 2018.
