= Hershey High School =

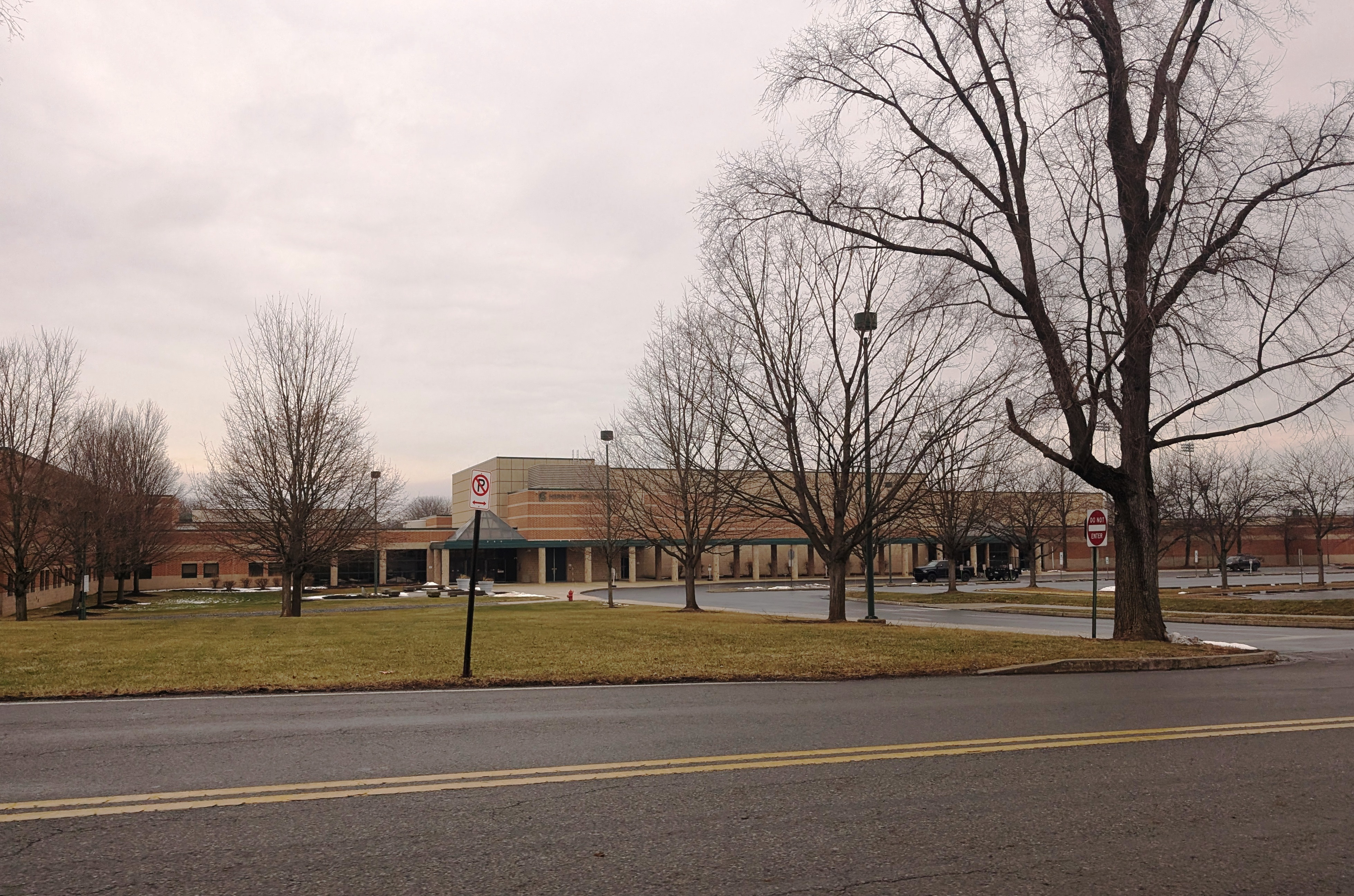

Location
- 550 Homestead Road; Hershey, Pennsylvania 17033; United States; 40°16′36″N 76°38′28″W

Information
- Type: Public
- Established: 1905
- School district: Derry Township School District
- Principal: Lindsey Schmidt
- Teaching staff: 83.00 (FTE)
- Grades: 9 to 12
- Enrollment: 1,079 (2023-2024)
- Student to teacher ratio: 13.00
- Language: English
- Campus: Suburban
- Campus size: 201,000 square feet (18,700 m^{2})
- Colors: Blue and Orange
- Team name: Trojan
- Rival: Lower Dauphin High School
- Newspaper: The Broadcaster
- Yearbook: The Choclatier
- Communities served: Derry Township, Hershey
- Feeder schools: Hershey Middle School
- Website: School website

Hershey High School is a comprehensive four-year public high school located in Hershey, Pennsylvania. The high school is one of four buildings which comprise the campus of the Derry Township School District and serves students in ninth through twelfth grades. Along with Hershey Middle School, the high school is nationally recognized as a Blue Ribbon School.

As of the 2019-2020 school year, the school had an enrollment of 1225 students and 82.48 classroom teachers (on an FTE basis), for a student–teacher ratio of 14.85:1.

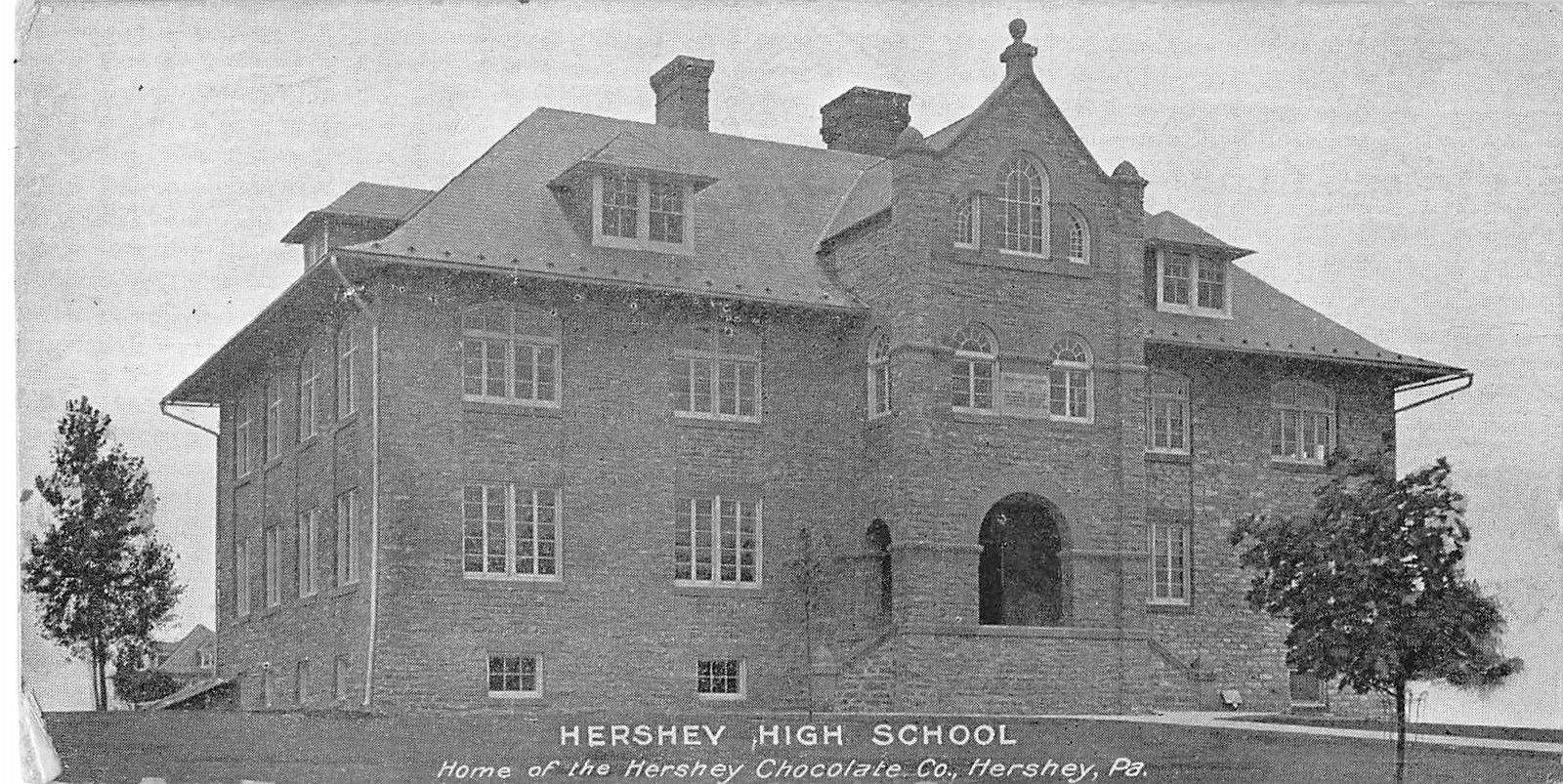
Hershey High School in the early 20th century

== Awards, recognition and rankings ==
Hershey High School ranks consistently as one of the top public schools in the state of Pennsylvania. U.S. News & World Report ranks it as the number one rated school in the Harrisburg metropolitan area, and the tenth best high school in Pennsylvania. Niche ranks the high school as the 14th best in the state.

Nationally, Hershey High School is ranked as the 471st best high school in the United States according to U.S. News & World Report, and the 599th best high school according to Newsweek.

In 1996, the school was nationally recognized as a Blue Ribbon School by the U.S. Department of Education for its academic excellence.

== Extracurricular activities ==
Hershey High School has a drama program which produces a musical each year, in addition to smaller productions throughout the year. The pit orchestra for Hershey's musicals has won the Hershey Theater Apollo Award for Best Student Orchestra in four of the last six years.

There are a number of clubs such as Future Business Leaders of America, Key Club, Youth and Government, Young Democrats, Young Republicans, C.A.L.L., Student World Action Committee, and other organizations available for students. A student-produced online newspaper, the nationally-accredited "Broadcaster", is updated throughout the year. A literary magazine, "Nexus", is also produced with works by students.

== Athletics ==
Hershey High has football, ice hockey, cheerleading, boys and girls basketball, wrestling, powerlifting, field hockey, boys and girls golf, boys and girls volleyball, boys and girls soccer, baseball, softball, track, cross country, swimming and diving, boys and girls lacrosse, and boys and girls tennis. Hershey High is a member of the Mid-Penn Conference of the Pennsylvania Interscholastic Athletic Association, or PIAA. It is a AAAAA school. Hershey High has a marching band and pep band, which support athletics throughout the year along with the cheerleaders. The bands perform songs that can be coordinated with a dance put together by the cheerleading squad.

=== Swimming and diving ===
In the 2009-2010 season the boys team went 13-0 in their duel meets and moved on to win both their district championship meet and the PIAA state championship. At the state meet David Nolan set a national age group record for high school boys going a time of 1:43.43 in the 200 yard IM, as well as setting the state record in the 100 yard freestyle. The medley relay set the national age group record with a time of 1:30.27. They earned 7 gold medals out of a possible 12 and had 17 swimmers qualify and participate at the meet. Hershey also set the record for the highest points ever scored at a PIAA state meet with 416. The Hershey High School boys swim team was the top-ranked boys' public high school team in the United States in 2010 according to Swimming World Magazine.

For the 2010-2011 season, both the Hershey boys and girls swimming and diving teams remained undefeated, winning the Commonwealth division 13-0 each, the Mid-Penn conference meet (seven combined meet records for swimming and one for diving) and the District III meet (seven first place and three district records for girls; nine first place and five records for the boys).

At the 2011 PIAA state championship meet, the women's 400 yard freestyle relay team set the National Federation of State High School Associations (NFHS) public school record (3:22.85). The boys' 200 yard freestyle relay team set the NFHS and NISCA national records (1:21.01) as the fastest high school team to that time in any class, public or independent. The boys 400 yard freestyle relay team also set the National Interscholastic Swimming Coaches Association (NISCA) public school record (3:00.71) as well as the individual 100 yard national freestyle record (42.34) and two other individual national records during the state meet: 45.49 in the 100 yard backstroke, and 1:41.39 in the 200 yard IM. As of the end of 2015, both the boys and girls teams remain undefeated.

Both the boys and girls swim teams won their 2011 state meets, with nine first-place finishes and eight state records combined (including the national records). The girls team accumulated a state record 269.5 points. By the end of the season, the boys team had produced ten NISCA All-America swimmers and one diver, and the girls team seven All-America swimmers, for a total of 56 event honors. In addition, four swimmers were also named Academic All-America. Swimming World magazine chose the Hershey High School men's swim team as the best in the nation in 2011 (Swimming World magazine, September 2011, 52(9):14).

== School symbols ==
- Hershey High's school colors are blue and orange. The mascot is the Trojan, and on November 16, 2007, a costumed mascot made its debut.
- Hershey's principal rivals are Lower Dauphin High School, Milton Hershey School, and Palmyra Area High School, all of which are in the vicinity of Hershey.
- Every year, Hershey plays a football game against the Milton Hershey School, which is called the "Cocoa Bean Game". This, along with homecoming, is generally the best-attended game each year.
- The fight song is "Onward Trojans", which is sung to the tune of "On, Wisconsin."

== Administration ==
Core members of the school's administration are:

- Lindsey Schmidt, Principal
- Gregory Miller, Assistant Principal
- Laurie Wade, Assistant Principal

== Demographics ==
Race/Ethnicity as of 2019-2020
Group	Number of Students	Percentage
Total	1225	100%
White	875	71.43%
Asian	152	12.41%
Hispanic	87	7.10%
Black	60	4.90%
Two or More Races	45	3.67%
American Indian/Alaska Native	5	0.41%
Native Hawaiian/Pacific Islander	1	0.08%

Gender as of 2019-2020
Group	Number of Students	Percentage
Total	1225	100%
Female	616	50.29%
Male	609	49.71%

== Notable alumni ==
- Scott Campbell, professional football player in the National Football League
- Scott Eatherton, basketball player
- John Huzvar, professional football player in the NFL
- Jules Jordan, class of 1992, film director, actor, and AVN and XRCO Hall of Fame inductee, born Ashley Gasper
- Kellen Kulbacki, professional baseball player in Major League Baseball
- Mark Malkoff, class of 1994, comedian and writer
- Jaime Pagliarulo, class of 1995, professional soccer player
- Christian Pulisic (did not graduate), professional soccer player for AC Milan
- Da’Vine Joy Randolph, Tony Award-nominated actress known for playing Oda Mae Brown in Ghost the Musical on Broadway, Oscar winning actress for her role in the Holdovers
- Jodie Steck, photojournalist
- Jay Taylor, professional football player in the NFL
- Chris Villarrial, professional football player in the NFL
- Michelle Wolf, class of 2003, comedian
