= Duke Blue Devils women's soccer =

American college soccer team

- 2025 Duke Blue Devils women's soccer team
- Founded: 1988; 38 years ago
- University: Duke University
- Head coach: Kieran Hall (2nd season)
- Conference: ACC
- Location: Durham, North Carolina, US
- Stadium: Koskinen Stadium (capacity: 4,500)
- Nickname: Blue Devils
- Colors: Duke blue and white
| Home | Away |

NCAA tournament runner-up
- 1992, 2011, 2015

NCAA tournament College Cup
- 1992, 2011, 2015, 2017, 2024, 2025

NCAA tournament Quarterfinals
- 1992, 2007, 2011, 2012, 2013, 2015, 2016, 2017, 2020, 2021, 2022, 2024, 2025

NCAA tournament Round of 16
- 1992, 1996, 2004, 2007, 2011, 2012, 2013, 2015, 2016, 2017, 2018, 2020, 2021, 2022, 2024, 2025

NCAA tournament appearances
- 1992, 1993, 1994, 1995, 1996, 1997, 1999, 2000, 2001, 2003, 2004, 2005, 2006, 2007, 2009, 2010, 2011, 2012, 2013, 2015, 2016, 2017, 2018, 2019, 2020, 2021, 2022, 2024, 2025

Conference regular season championships
- 1994, 2011, 2017, 2024

The Duke Blue Devils women's soccer team represent Duke University in the Atlantic Coast Conference (ACC) of NCAA Division I women's college soccer. The team was founded in 1988. The Blue Devils have won the ACC regular season championship four times. The team has advanced to the NCAA Women's soccer tournament 26 times, including 5 College Cup appearances.

== History ==
=== 1980s ===
Duke Women's Soccer was established in 1988 under head coach Bill Hempen, who was a Duke Men's soccer coach prior to this position. Hempen was assisted by Carla Overbeck, a previous player at UNC Chapel Hill. While at UNC, Overbeck remained unbeaten for four seasons, and won four national championships. Dukes first two seasons were successful ones. The team won 10 games in their inaugural 1988 season, and followed that with 14 wins in 1989. The two seasons had a combined 1–4–1 ACC record and the team did not make an NCAA Tournament appearance in either season.

=== 1990s ===
The 1990s began with a similar story of out of conference success, but ACC struggle. The Blue Devils only managed one ACC win each season in 1990–1992. However, in 1992, the team finished as runner up in the ACC Tournament and qualified for the NCAA Tournament. In their first-ever NCAA appearance, Duke made it all the way to the final, only to lose to North Carolina. This began a string of six consecutive NCAA appearances for the team. The Blue Devils also notched a then program record 17 wins in 1992 and 1994. The streak of NCAA Tournament appearances ended in 1998, when the Blue Devils failed to qualify for the tournament after a 7–11–2 season. During this stretch the team never advanced past the second round in the NCAA Tournament, but did win double digit games in each year. The decade ended with a return to the NCAA tournament and a 13–10–0 season in 1999.

In 1999, while coaching at Duke, Overbeck played in the 1999 FIFA Women's World Cup as a captain. This team went on to win the world championship.

=== 2000s ===
In 2001, the Duke Women's Soccer program received a new head coach, Robbie Church, Church was assisted by Overbeck and Billy Lesesne, who had coached with Church at Vanderbilt. Previous coach, Bill Hempen, took a new job with the Colorado Buffaloes. The transition would prove a difficult one, with the Blue Devils winning 9 and 8 games in Hempen's first two seasons. In 2002, Duke missed the NCAA Tournament for only the second time in 11 years. However, the lull would not last for long. 2003 saw the team win 14 games and start a new streak of NCAA appearances. The following year, 2004, the Blue Devils won 15 games and reached the NCAA Round of 16. The team reached the NCAA Tournament for the remainder of the decade, and reached the Quarterfinals twice, in 2007 and 2008. 2009 proved to be a down year with the team finishing 8–9–4 and only reaching the first round of the NCAA Tournament.

=== 2010s ===
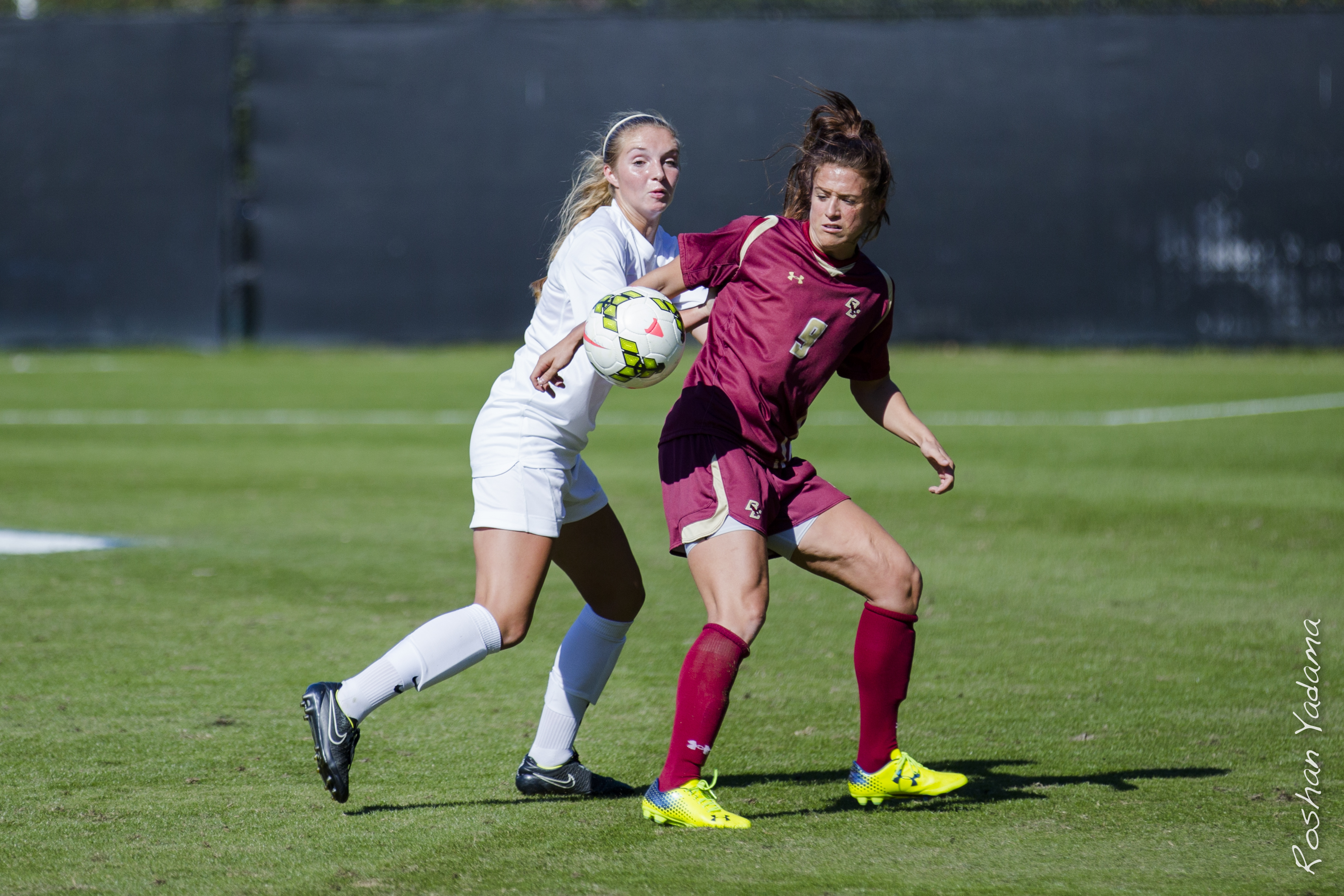
Schuyler DeBree DWS member, in action v Boston College, 2014

The decade began with a run to the NCAA Round of 16 in 2010. 2011 proved an even better season. The Blue Devils set a new record for total wins in a season with 22 en route to the NCAA Final. However, they would fall short to Stanford in the final. 2012 and 2013 also saw runs to the NCAA Quarterfinals, but the 2013 campaign only yielded 9 total wins. In 2014, Lesesne left Duke for a head coaching job at Georgia, and was replaced by Erwin van Bennekom. 2014 proved difficult, as the Blue Devils had their first losing season since 2009 and ended a spell of eleven straight NCAA Tournament appearances. However, 2014 would prove to be just a blip. In the 2015 season, the Blue Devils women's soccer team made a run to the final of the Women's Soccer College Cup, which they lost to Penn State by a score of 1–0. 2017 saw the team set a program record for total wins with 23 and ACC wins with 10. The Blue Devils made another run to the College Cup. This time they lost to UCLA on penalties.

=== 2020s ===
The decade started with a season shortened by the COVID-19 pandemic. The team played a shortened non-conference schedule in the spring and played a reduced ACC schedule. They finished in fifth place in the ACC with a 4–2–2 record. They reached the Quarterfinals of the NCAA Tournament, posting their best result in that tournament since 2017. 2021 saw a return to a more normal schedule where the team finished 16–4–1 and 7–2–1 in ACC play to finish in third place. They again reached the Quarterfinals of the NCAA Tournament. In 2022, the Blue Devils finished 15–5–3 overall and 6–2–2 in ACC play to finish in a tie for fourth place. They extended their streak of NCAA Tournament Quarterfinal appearances to three, but were again stopped at that stage. 2023 did not end well for the Blue Devils as they finished 6–7–3 overall and 2–5–3 in ACC play. Their six total wins were the lowest in program history at the time, and their two total conference wins were the lowest since the 2002 season. It was the first season in seven years they did not qualify for the ACC tournament and it ended an eight-year streak of qualifying for the NCAA tournament. Head coach Robbie Church had considered retirement prior to the 2023 season, but did not want to end on a low note. He returned for 2024, and the Blue Devils had a resurgent season. They were ranked first in the nation for an extended period and won their fourth ACC regular season title. They finished 9–0–1 in ACC play. However, they fell twice in the postseason to rivals North Carolina. Once in the semifinals of the ACC tournament, and once in the College Cup Semifinals. They finished 18–3–1 overall. Kieran Hall was selected as Duke's new coach prior to the 2025 season. Hall's first season was a success, as he led the team to a 17–5–1 overall record and a 7–3–0 ACC record. The team qualified for a second straight NCAA Semifinal, falling 1–0 to Stanford.

== Personnel ==
=== Current roster ===
As of August 15, 2026

Note: Flags indicate national team as defined under FIFA eligibility rules; some limited exceptions apply. Players may hold more than one non-FIFA nationality.

| No. | Pos. | Nation | Player |
|---|---|---|---|
| 0 | GK | USA | Molly Vapensky |
| 3 | DF | USA | Daya King |
| 4 | DF | USA | Jocelyn Travers |
| 5 | MF | USA | Phoebe Goldthwaite |
| 6 | MF | USA | Natalie Chudowsky |
| 7 | DF | USA | Cameron Roller |
| 8 | DF | USA | Elle Piper |
| 9 | MF | USA | Lauren Martinho |
| 10 | FW | USA | Avery Oder |
| 11 | MF | USA | Rylee McLanahan |
| 13 | FW | USA | Mia Minestrella |
| 14 | MF | USA | Sophia Recupero |
| 15 | MF | USA | Mia Oliaro |

| No. | Pos. | Nation | Player |
|---|---|---|---|
| 17 | MF | USA | Sam Courtwright |
| 18 | FW | USA | Katie Shea Collins |
| 19 | MF | MEX | Sofia Nuñez |
| 20 | MF | USA | Kosette Koons-Perdikis |
| 21 | DF | USA | Lexi Coughlin |
| 22 | DF | USA | Sam Bodensteiner |
| 23 | MF | JPN | Yuna Marui |
| 24 | MF | USA | Kaeden Koons-Perdikis |
| 25 | MF | USA | Madison Foxhoven |
| 26 | GK | USA | Bianca Dominguez |
| 27 | FW | USA | Kaylee Kim |
| 30 | GK | USA | Caroline Dysart |

=== Team management ===
| Position | Staff |
|---|---|
| Head coach | Kieran Hall |
| Associate head coach | Carla Overbeck |
| Assistant coach | Hanna Gardner |
| Director of Operations | Evan Gaffney |

== Facilities ==
The Blue Devils play on Koskinen Stadium. The Koskinen is also home to the men's soccer team, along with the men's and women's lacrosse teams. The stadium was dedicated in 1999 in honor of John and Patricia Koskinen. The stadium can hold around 7,000 fans. Kennedy Tower is a new addition to Koskinen Stadium. It was recently dedicated in 2015 in honor of Chris and Ana Kennedy. Chris is the Duke Senior Deputy Director of Athletes. The Kennedy Tower, offers press boxes and hospitality suites to the top of Koskinen Stadium. The teams' locker rooms are in the Willam David Murray Building. The Duke Football team used to use the Murray Building from 1988 to 2002. Then the men's and women's soccer and lacrosse teams moved into the building. It houses the training room and weight room for all other Olympic Sports teams.

== Seasons ==
| Season | Head coach | Season result | | | | | | Tournament results | |
| Season | Head coach | Overall | | | Conference | | | Conference | NCAA |
| Season | Head coach | Wins | Losses | Ties | Wins | Losses | Ties | Conference | NCAA |
|---|---|---|---|---|---|---|---|---|---|
| 1988 | Bill Hempen | 10 | 6 | 1 | 0 | 1 | 1 | First round | — |
| 1989 | Bill Hempen | 14 | 8 | 0 | 1 | 3 | 0 | First round | — |
| 1990 | Bill Hempen | 12 | 8 | 0 | 1 | 3 | 0 | Second Round | — |
| 1991 | Bill Hempen | 8 | 10 | 1 | 1 | 2 | 1 | First round | — |
| 1992 | Bill Hempen | 17 | 5 | 2 | 1 | 2 | 1 | Runner up | NCAA Runner Up |
| 1993 | Bill Hempen | 12 | 6 | 3 | 2 | 1 | 1 | Runner up | NCAA First Round |
| 1994 | Bill Hempen | 17 | 5 | 1 | 5 | 0 | 1 | Runner up | NCAA Second Round |
| 1995 | Bill Hempen | 14 | 7 | 1 | 4 | 3 | 0 | Second Round | NCAA Second Round |
| 1996 | Bill Hempen | 10 | 10 | 3 | 3 | 3 | 1 | First round | NCAA Second Round |
| 1997 | Bill Hempen | 14 | 6 | 1 | 6 | 1 | 0 | Second Round | NCAA First Round |
| 1998 | Bill Hempen | 7 | 11 | 2 | 0 | 5 | 2 | First round | — |
| 1999 | Bill Hempen | 13 | 10 | 0 | 2 | 5 | 0 | First round | NCAA Second Round |
| 2000 | Bill Hempen | 14 | 8 | 1 | 4 | 3 | 0 | Runner up | NCAA Second Round |
| 2001 | Robbie Church | 8 | 10 | 1 | 2 | 5 | 0 | First round | NCAA Second Round |
| 2002 | Robbie Church | 9 | 9 | 2 | 2 | 3 | 2 | Second Round | — |
| 2003 | Robbie Church | 14 | 7 | 1 | 4 | 3 | 0 | Second Round | NCAA Second Round |
| 2004 | Robbie Church | 15 | 8 | 0 | 5 | 4 | 0 | Second Round | NCAA Round of 16 |
| 2005 | Robbie Church | 14 | 6 | 1 | 6 | 4 | 0 | Second Round | NCAA Second Round |
| 2006 | Robbie Church | 9 | 8 | 4 | 5 | 4 | 1 | First round | NCAA Second Round |
| 2007 | Robbie Church | 10 | 6 | 7 | 3 | 3 | 4 | First round | NCAA Quarterfinal |
| 2008 | Robbie Church | 15 | 6 | 3 | 4 | 3 | 3 | First round | NCAA Quarterfinal |
| 2009 | Robbie Church | 8 | 9 | 4 | 4 | 4 | 2 | First round | NCAA First Round |
| 2010 | Robbie Church | 11 | 8 | 4 | 4 | 5 | 1 | First round | NCAA Round of 16 |
| 2011 | Robbie Church | 22 | 4 | 1 | 8 | 1 | 1 | Second Round | NCAA Runner Up |
| 2012 | Robbie Church | 15 | 6 | 2 | 5 | 3 | 2 | First round | NCAA Quarterfinal |
| 2013 | Robbie Church | 9 | 9 | 6 | 5 | 5 | 3 | First round | NCAA Quarterfinal |
| 2014 | Robbie Church | 8 | 9 | 1 | 4 | 5 | 1 | — | — |
| 2015 | Robbie Church | 14 | 6 | 5 | 4 | 3 | 3 | — | NCAA Runner up |
| 2016 | Robbie Church | 15 | 5 | 3 | 7 | 2 | 1 | First round | NCAA Quarterfinal |
| 2017 | Robbie Church | 23 | 2 | 1 | 10 | 0 | 0 | Runner up | NCAA Semifinal |
| 2018 | Robbie Church | 16 | 4 | 2 | 8 | 1 | 1 | First round | NCAA Round of 16 |
| 2019 | Robbie Church | 9 | 4 | 7 | 3 | 1 | 6 | First round | NCAA Second Round |
| 2020 | Robbie Church | 12 | 5 | 4 | 4 | 2 | 2 | Second Round | NCAA Quarterfinal |
| 2021 | Robbie Church | 16 | 4 | 1 | 7 | 2 | 1 | First round | NCAA Quarterfinal |
| 2022 | Robbie Church | 15 | 5 | 3 | 6 | 2 | 2 | Semifinal | NCAA Quarterfinal |
| 2023 | Robbie Church | 6 | 7 | 3 | 2 | 5 | 3 | — | — |
| 2024 | Robbie Church | 18 | 3 | 1 | 9 | 0 | 1 | Semifinal | NCAA Semifinal |
| 2025 | Kieran Hall | 17 | 5 | 1 | 7 | 3 | 0 | Semifinal | NCAA Semifinal |

== Honors and awards ==
Michelle Cooper won the 2022 Hermann Trophy, becoming the first Duke women's soccer player to win college soccer's highest individual award.

=== United Soccer Coaches All-Americans ===
The Blue Devils have received 22 All-American honors, including eight first-team selections.

| Name | Year |
|---|---|
| Kat Rader | 2025 (1st team) |
| Mia Minestrella | 2025 (2nd team) |
| Leah Freeman | 2024 (1st team) |
| Maggie Graham | 2024 (1st team) |
| Hannah Bebar | 2024 (2nd team) |
| Cameron Roller | 2024 (2nd team) |
| Michelle Cooper | 2021 (1st team), 2022 (1st team) |
| Sophie Jones | 2020 (3rd team) |
| Kayla McCoy | 2018 (1st team) |
| Imani Dorsey | 2017 (1st team) |
| Quinn (Note: Known as Rebecca Quinn while at Duke) | 2017 (1st team) |
| Schuyler DeBree | 2017 (3rd team) |
| Christina Gibbons | 2015 (2nd team), 2016 (1st team) |
| Natasha Anasi | 2011 (1st team), 2012 (2nd team) |
| Kaitlyn Kerr | 2011 (3rd team) |
| Becca Moros | 2006 (3rd team) |
| Carolyn Ford | 2005 (2nd team) |
| Sherrill Kester | 1999 (3rd team) |
| Andi Melde | 1997 (3rd team) |
| Kristy Whelchel | 1996 (3rd team) |
| Kelly Walbert | 1993 (1st team), 1994 (1st team), 1995 (2nd team) |
| Jennifer Lewis | 1992 (2nd team) |

=== All-ACC honorees ===
The Blue Devils have received 106 All-ACC honors, including over 50 first-team selections.

| Name | Year | Other recognitions |
|---|---|---|
| Mia Minestrella | 2025 (1st team) | |
| Carina Lageyre | 2025 (3rd team) | |
| Leah Freeman | 2023 (3rd team), 2024 (1st team) | 2024 Goalkeeper of the Year |
| Maggie Graham | 2024 (1st team) | 2024 Midfielder of the Year, 2023 (all-freshman team) |
| Cameron Roller | 2024 (1st team), 2025 (3rd team) | 2024 Defensive Player of the Year |
| Hannah Bebar | 2024 (2nd team) | |
| Ella Hase | 2024 (2nd team) | |
| Mia Oliaro | 2024 (2nd team) | |
| Kat Rader | 2022 (2nd team), 2023 (2nd team), 2025 (2nd team) | 2022 ACC Freshman of the Year |
| Tess Boade | 2021 (1st team) | |
| Michelle Cooper | 2021 (1st team), 2022 (1st team) | 2021 ACC Freshman of the Year, 2021 MAC Hermann Trophy semifinalist, 2022 ACC Offensive Player of the Year, 2022 MAC Hermann Trophy winner |
| Ruthie Jones | 2021 (1st team), 2022 (2nd team) | |
| Sophie Jones | 2020 (1st team), 2021 (2nd team), 2022 (2nd team) | |
| Delaney Graham | 2019 (2nd team), 2020 (3rd team), 2022 (2nd team) | |
| Taylor Mitchell | 2020 (3rd team) | |
| Ella Stevens | 2016 (3rd team), 2017 (2nd team), 2018 (2nd team), 2019 (2nd team) | |
| Kayla McCoy | 2017 (1st team), 2018 (1st team) | 2018 MAC Hermann Trophy semifinalist |
| Taylor Racioppi | 2017 (2nd team), 2018 (2nd team) | |
| Schuyler DeBree | 2017 (1st team) | 2017 ACC Defensive Player of the Year |
| Imani Dorsey | 2016 (2nd team), 2017 (1st team) | 2017 ACC Offensive Player of the Year, 2017 MAC Hermann Trophy semifinalist, 2017 United Soccer Coaches National Scholar-Athlete of the Year |
| EJ Proctor | 2017 (1st team) | 2015 NCAA College Cup Most Valuable Defensive Player |
| Quinn | 2015 (3rd team), 2017 (1st team) | 2017 ACC Midfielder of the Year, 2017 MAC Hermann Trophy semifinalist |
| Ashton Miller | 2015 (3rd team), 2017 (3rd team) | |
| Christina Gibbons | 2014 (2nd team), 2015 (1st team), 2016 (1st team) | 2016 ACC Defensive Player of the Year, 2016 MAC Hermann Trophy semifinalist |
| Toni Payne | 2014 (2nd team), 2016 (1st team) | |
| Natasha Anasi | 2011 (1st team), 2012 (2nd team), 2013 (2nd team) | 2011 ACC Defensive Player of the Year, 2012 MAC Hermann Trophy semifinalist |
| Kim DeCesare | 2012 (2nd team), 2013 (3rd team) | |
| Cassie Pecht | 2012 (2nd team) | 2012 ACC Freshman of the Year |
| Laura Weinberg | 2010 (2nd team), 2011 (2nd team), 2012 (1st team) | |
| Kaitlyn Kerr | 2011 (1st team) | |
| Tara Campbell | 2009 (2nd team), 2011 (2nd team) | |
| Kelly Cobb | 2011 (2nd team) | |
| Mollie Pathman | 2010 (2nd team), 2011 (2nd team) | |
| KayAnne Gummersall | 2009 (2nd team) | |
| Elisabeth Redmond | 2007 (2nd team), 2008 (1st team), 2009 (1st team) | |
| Lorraine Quinn | 2007 (1st team), 2008 (2nd team) | |
| Darby Kroyer | 2005 (2nd team), 2006 (2nd team) | |
| Becca Moros | 2004 (2nd team), 2005 (1st team), 2006 (1st team) | |
| Carolyn Ford | 2005 (1st team) | 2005 ACC Defensive Player of the Year |
| Casey McCluskey | 2001 (1st team), 2002 (1st team), 2003 (1st team), 2004 (1st team) | 2001 ACC Freshman of the Year, 2004 ACC Offensive Player of the Year |
| Thora Helgadottir | 2001 (1st team), 2002 (1st team), 2003 (1st team) | ACC 50th Anniversary Team |
| Kate Seibert | 2003 (2nd team) | |
| Liz Wagner | 2002 (2nd team) | |
| Carly Fuller | 2000 (2nd team), 2001 (2nd team) | |
| Kim Daws | 2000 (2nd team) | |
| Gwendolyn Oxenham | 2000 (2nd team) | |
| Sarah Pickens | 2000 (1st team) | |
| Sherrill Kester | 1996 (1st team), 1998 (2nd team), 1999 (1st team) | ACC 50th Anniversary Team |
| Kasey Truman | 1999 (2nd team) | |
| Kristy Whelchel | 1995 (2nd team), 1996 (1st team), 1997 (2nd team), 1998 (1st team) | ACC 50th Anniversary Team |
| Andi Melde | 1997 (1st team) | 1997 ACC Player of the Year, ACC 50th Anniversary Team |
| Samantha Baggett | 1994 (1st team), 1996 (2nd team), 1997 (2nd team) | |
| Cara Lyons | 1994 (2nd team), 1995 (2nd team) | |
| Kelly Walbert | 1993 (1st team), 1994 (1st team), 1995 (1st team) | 1995 ACC Player of the Year, ACC 50th Anniversary Team |
| Melissa Carr | 1994 (2nd team) | |
| Lauren Cyran | 1994 (2nd team) | |
| Mandy Lehr | 1994 (2nd team) | |
| Katherine Remy | 1993 (1st team), 1994 (1st team) | |
| Missy Durham | 1993 (1st team) | |
| Jennifer Lewis | 1991 (1st team), 1992 (1st team) | |
| Heidi Mauger | 1992 (1st team) | |
| Delilah Huelsing | 1990 (1st team) | |
| Sue Sanders | 1990 (1st team) | |
| Caitlin Connolly | 1989 (1st team) | |
| Mary Pat Rosenthal | 1988 (1st team) | |

Isis Dallis also won ACC Freshman of the Year in 1997.

=== Coaching awards ===
Duke has received eight awards for coaching.

| Name | Awards |
|---|---|
| Robbie Church | ACC Coach of the Year (2011, 2017, 2024) |
| Bill Hempen | National Coach of the Year (1992), ACC Coach of the Year (1992, 1994, 1997) |
| Entire staff | 2017 National Staff of the Year |

== Notable alumni ==
=== Current Professionals ===
As of August 15, 2026

- (United States) Becca Moros – (2003–2006) – Currently head coach at Arizona
- Natasha Anasi – (2010–2013) – Currently with Grindavík/Njarðvík and Iceland international
- Toni Payne – (2013–2016) – Currently with Everton and Nigeria international
- Quinn – (2013–2017) – Currently with Vancouver Rise FC and Canada international
- Kayla McKenna – (2015–2018) – Currently with GC Zurich and Jamaica international
- (United States) Ella Stevens – (2016–2019) – Currently with the Boston Legacy FC
- (United States) Tess Boade – (2017-2021) – Currently with Bay FC
- Caitlin Cosme – (2017-2021) – Currently with Nantes and Puerto Rico international
- (United States) Lily Nabet – (2017-2021) – Currently with Carolina Ascent FC
- (United States) Sophie Jones (2019–2022) – Currently with Sporting JAX
- (United States) Maggie Graham – (2020–2024) – Currently with Houston Dash
- (United States) Michelle Cooper – (2021-2022) – Currently with Kansas City Current
- (United States) Kat Rader – (2022-2025) – Currently with Houston Dash
- (United States) Leah Freeman (2023-2024) – Currently with San Diego Wave FC
- (United States) Hannah Bebar (2024) – Currently with Bay FC
- (United States) Ella Hase (2024) – Currently with Racing Louisville FC
- (United States) Mary Long (2024) – Currently with Kansas City Current
- (United States) Carina Lageyre – (2022-2025) – Currently with Angel City FC
- (United States) Devin Lynch – (2022-2025) – Currently with Denver Summit FC
