= Heather Beem =

Retired American soccer player

Personal information
- Date of birth: March 3, 1981 (age 45)
- Place of birth: Vancouver, Washington, United States
- Position: Forward

College career
Years	Team	Apps	(Gls)
1999–2002	Clemson Tigers	86	(28)

Senior career*
Years	Team	Apps	(Gls)
2003	New York Power	12	(1)
- * Club domestic league appearances and goals

Heather Beem (born March 3, 1981, in Vancouver, Washington) is a retired American soccer player who used to play for the New York Power.

== Biography ==
Beem was born in Vancouver, Washington on March 3, 1981. She attended Jesuit High School, where she helped her soccer team with three state high school championships. She also won the 2003 U-23 National Championship.

In 1999, she signed with Clemson University Athletics.

In 2003, Beem was drafted in the fourth round to play with the New York Power, a Women's United Soccer Association team, though she remained at Clemson University short-term to finish her degree.
