= Jaime Pagliarulo =

American soccer player (born 1976)

Personal information
- Date of birth: July 20, 1976 (age 50)
- Place of birth: Hershey, Pennsylvania, U.S.
- Height: 5 ft 7 in (1.70 m)
- Position: Goalkeeper

Youth career
- –1995: Hershey Trojans

College career
Years	Team	Apps	(Gls)
1995–1998	George Mason Patriots	65	(0)

Senior career*
Years	Team	Apps	(Gls)
2000	Maryland Pride		
2001–2003	San Diego Spirit	42	(0)

International career
1993–1997	United States U20		
1997–2001	United States	3	(0)

Managerial career
- 1999: George Mason Patriots (assistant)
- 2004–2007: Arizona State Sun Devils (assistant)
- 2007–: RSL AZ
- 2010–: Hamilton Huskies (assistant)
- 2015–: Hamilton Huskies JV
- * Club domestic league appearances and goals

Jaime Pagliarulo (born July 20, 1976) is an American former soccer player who played as a goalkeeper, making three appearances for the United States women's national team.

== Career ==
Pagliarulo played for the Hershey Trojans in high school, and was a two-time Parade High School All-American. She also played field hockey, basketball, and softball in high school. In college, she played for the George Mason Patriots from 1995 to 1998. She was an NSCAA Second-Team All-American from 1996 to 1998 and was included on the All-Region team in the same span. She was an All-CAA in all four years (second team in 1995 and 1996, first team in 1997 and 1998) and was included in the CAA All-Tournament Team in 1998. Pagliarulo was a VASID All-Virginia first-team player from 1996 to 1998, and received the CAA Commissioner's Academic Award in 1997. In total, she made 65 appearances for the Patriots during her career. She holds the record for most career saves in school history with 375, as well as ranking second in shutouts with 20.

Pagliarulo played for the U.S. under-20 national team at the Nordic Cup. She made her international debut for the United States on May 4, 1997, in a friendly match against South Korea. In total, she made three appearances for the U.S., earning her final cap on June 30, 2001, in a friendly match against Canada.

In club soccer, Pagliarulo played for the Maryland Pride before joining the San Diego Spirit after being selected in the 2000 WUSA Draft. She played for the Spirit from 2001 to 2003, making 42 total appearances in her three seasons.

Pagliarulo helped train the goalkeepers as an assistant coach for the George Mason Patriots during the 1999 season. She later worked as an assistant coach specializing in goalkeeper training for the Arizona State Sun Devils from 2004 to 2007. Since 2007, she has worked as a coach for the girls' soccer team of Hamilton High School, as well as coaching various girls' youth teams at RSL AZ. In 2005, Pagliarulo was inducted into the Hershey High School Athletic Hall of Fame.

== Personal life ==
Pagliarulo is a native of Hershey, Pennsylvania. She graduated with a Bachelor of Arts in physical education from George Mason University in 2000. Prior to the WUSA draft, she worked as a physical education teacher at a local elementary school. Since 2005, she has served as a director of the Julie Foudy Sports Leadership Academy. She has also worked as a behavior coach at Frye Elementary School, and runs workshops as a leadership coach for junior and high school students. Jamie now works at Conley Elementary in Chandler, Arizona.

== Career statistics ==
=== International ===
United States
Year	Apps	Goals
1997	1	0
2001	2	0
Total	3	0
