= Jodie Steck =

American photojournalist (died 2025)

- Born: Jo Ann Steck; Hershey, Pennsylvania, U.S.
- Died: July 11, 2025 (aged 73)
- Education: Arizona State University
- Occupations: Photojournalist; journalist; educator
- Years active: 1977–2018
- Partner: Susan Matthews
- Children: 1

Jodie Steck (born Jo Ann Steck; died July 11, 2025) was an American photojournalist. She led the team that won the Pulitzer Prize for Breaking News Photography in 2004 for The Dallas Morning News photographic coverage of 2003 invasion of Iraq. She served as the White House deputy of photography under President George W. Bush from 2005 to 2009.

== Early life ==
Jo Ann Steck was born in Hershey, Pennsylvania, to Betty (née Clark) and Robert Steck. She went by Jodie. She graduated from Hershey High School. She studied journalism with a concentration in photojournalism at Arizona State University in the 1970s.

== Career ==
In 1977, Steck began working for local outlets in Arizona, including the Arizona Republic. She joined the Associated Press (AP) in Los Angeles in 1980. She worked for The New York Times and as director of photography of The Press Democrat of Santa Rosa, California. In 1992, she began working in San Francisco and became a photo editor with the San Francisco bureau of the AP. In February 1994, she was named the assistant chief of bureau for photos in Los Angeles. She later became senior national photo editor. She also worked at The Orange County Register from 1994 to 1997 and the San Francisco Chronicle as a copy editor in 1997. She worked as deputy director of photography at The Dallas Morning News and led a team of photographers that received the Pulitzer Prize for Breaking News Photography in 2004 for its coverage of the 2003 invasion of Iraq. Cheryl Diaz Meyer, one of the Pulitzer winning photographers, said that she was methodical and ensured that photos were "presented with nuance". Steck wrote about topics, including the murder trial of O. J. Simpson, natural disasters, and the Super Bowl and other sporting events.

Steck served as the White House deputy of photography under President George W. Bush from 2005 to 2009. She was audiovisual archives specialist for the George W. Bush Presidential Center. In 2018, she was acting chief of operations of the White House Photo Office. She also worked as an adjunct instructor in photojournalism at the University of California, Los Angeles, the Southern Methodist University, and the Corcoran College of the Arts and Design. Later in life, she worked as a certified pharmacy technician at CVS Health in Port Orange, Florida.

== Personal life ==
Steck's partner was Susan Matthews. She had one son. She played competitive pickleball in Port Orange.

Steck retired in Port Orange. She died of ovarian cancer on July 11, 2025, at the age of 73.
