= Jim Barr =

American baseball player (born 1948)

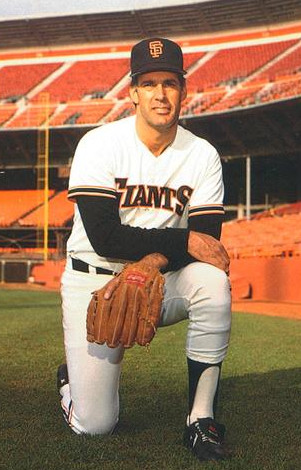
- Barr in 1983
- Pitcher
- Born: February 10, 1948 (age 78); Lynwood, California, U.S.
- Batted: Right Threw: Right

MLB debut
- July 31, 1971, for the San Francisco Giants

Last MLB appearance
- October 2, 1983, for the San Francisco Giants

MLB statistics
- Win–loss record: 101–112
- Earned run average: 3.56
- Strikeouts: 741
- Stats at Baseball Reference

Teams
- San Francisco Giants (1971–1978); California Angels (1979–1980); San Francisco Giants (1982–1983)

Career highlights and awards
- San Francisco Giants Wall of Fame

James Leland Barr (born February 10, 1948) is an American former professional baseball right-handed pitcher in Major League Baseball (MLB) who played for the San Francisco Giants (1971–1978, 1982–1983) and California Angels (1979–1980).

In 1972, Barr set an MLB record when he retired 41 consecutive batters over the course of two starts. The record was later tied by Bobby Jenks in 2007, and then broken by Mark Buehrle on July 28, 2009, and again by Yusmeiro Petit on August 28, 2014. Barr remains the only pitcher to retire at least 41 consecutive batters in the course of only two games; his streak began in the third inning of a complete-game win and extended through the seventh inning of another complete-game win (Buehrle's streak included his perfect game and the starts before and after, while the streaks of Jenks and Petit included a number of relief appearances).

== Career ==
Barr attended the University of Southern California (USC), where his teammates included Dave Kingman, and helped lead their baseball team to a pair of NCAA championships in 1968 and 1970. He graduated from USC in 1970 with a Bachelor's degree in Business Administration. After previously being drafted five times (by the California Angels, Philadelphia Phillies, New York Yankees, Pittsburgh Pirates, and Minnesota Twins), he was selected by the San Francisco Giants in the third round of the 1970 Major League Baseball draft (secondary phase) and signed with the club that summer.

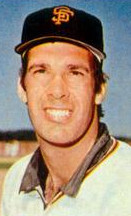
Barr, circa 1977

The Giants called Barr up from the minors midway through the 1971 season, and he posted a 1–1 record and a 3.57 ERA in 17 appearances out of the bullpen. He joined the team's rotation in the middle of 1972 and, despite never pitching a no-hitter or perfect game, that summer set the record for consecutive batters retired. Over the course of two starts, on August 23 and August 29, he retired 41 players in a row. On August 23 against the Pittsburgh Pirates, he walked opposing pitcher Bob Moose to lead off the third inning and then retired the final 21 batters to end the game with a 2-hitter. In his next start, he retired the first 20 St. Louis Cardinals in order before Bernie Carbo earned a seventh-inning double. He also earned the win with a complete game 3-hitter.

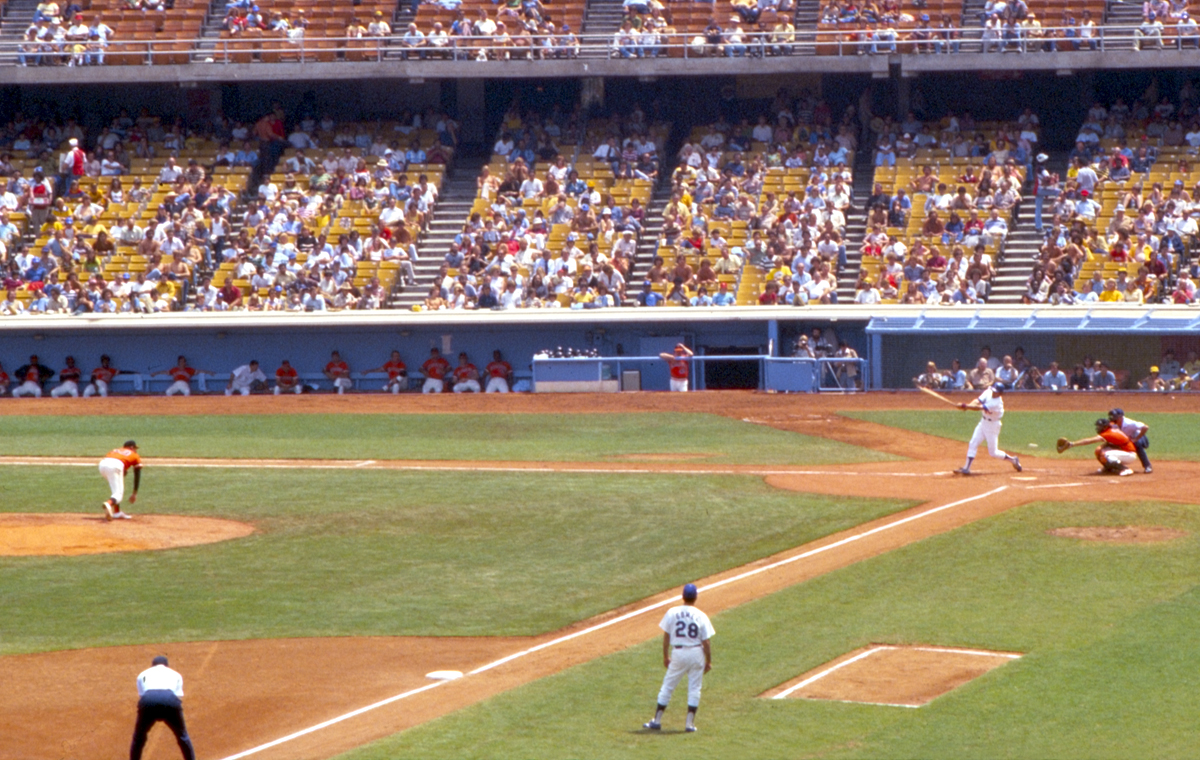
Barr pitching for the Giants in 1977

Barr went on to win at least ten games for the Giants in five straight seasons, from 1973 to 1977. During that time, he finished in the National League's top ten three times for earned run average and shutouts, twice for complete games and innings pitched, and led the league in 1974 with 1.76 BB/9IP. Following the 1978 campaign, he became a free agent and signed with the California Angels.

Barr won 10 games in his first year with the Angels, a season in which the club in Anaheim won the American League West to reach the playoffs for the first time. However, Barr did not pitch for the Angels in the playoffs after breaking his hand punching a toilet at a party celebrating their division championship. Barr struggled with arm injuries in 1980 and was released at the end of 1981 spring training. Halfway through the season, he signed with the Chicago White Sox organization and played the rest of the year for their Edmonton Trappers farm club before being let go at the conclusion of the minor league season. He returned to the big leagues with the Giants in 1982 and appeared in 53 games in both that season and the next.

Barr was the pitching coach at Sacramento State University for 16 years. He lives with his wife, Susie, in Granite Bay, California.

== Personal ==
Barr's athletic predisposition has been passed on to his daughters, Betsy and Emmy. Both have played soccer collegiately and professionally. Betsy played soccer at the University of Portland and was a member of the Women's United Soccer Association (WUSA) after being drafted by the San Jose CyberRays in 2003. Emmy went to Santa Clara University and played three seasons with the Washington Freedom of the WUSA. Additionally, his brother, Mark Barr, pitched in the Boston Red Sox farm system for several years in the 1970s.

== See also ==
- List of Major League Baseball individual streaks
