= Kelly Cagle =

American soccer player (born 1974)

Personal information
- Full name: Kelly Walbert Cagle
- Birth name: Kelly Clark Walbert
- Date of birth: August 22, 1974 (age 52)
- Place of birth: Tucson, Arizona, U.S.
- Height: 5 ft 5 in (1.65 m)
- Positions: Forward; midfielder

College career
Years	Team	Apps	(Gls)
1992–1995	Duke Blue Devils	90	(47)

Senior career*
Years	Team	Apps	(Gls)
1998–2000	Raleigh Wings		
2001–2002	Atlanta Beat	29	(3)

International career
1994	United States	1	(0)

Managerial career
- 2003–2010: Virginia Tech Hokies
- * Club domestic league appearances and goals

Kelly Walbert Cagle (born Kelly Clark Walbert; August 22, 1974) is an American former professional soccer player who featured as a forward and midfielder and was a member of the United States women's national soccer team.

== Early life ==
Cagle was born in Tucson, Arizona, and attended Salpointe Catholic High School. She later attended Duke University and was a student-athlete on the Duke Blue Devils women's soccer team from 1992 to 1995. She appeared in 90 games and scored 47 times.

== Career ==
Prior to joining the Women's United Soccer Association, Bivens played for the Raleigh Wings. She was selected in the tenth round of the 2000 WUSA Draft by the Atlanta Beat as the 80th overall selection.

== International ==
Cagle made one appearance for the United States women's national soccer team when she was a substitute on April 19, 1994, against Trinidad and Tobago.

== Coaching ==
Cagle served as the head coach of the Virginia Tech Hokies women's soccer team from 2003 to 2010. She also served as an assistant coach at Texas Longhorns women's soccer and Wake Forest Demon Deacons women's soccer prior to Virginia Tech.

== Career statistics ==
=== Club ===
These statistics are incomplete and currently represent a portion of Cagle's career.

Appearances and goals by club, season and competition
Club	Season	League			Other		Total	
Club	Season	Division	Apps	Goals	Apps	Goals	Apps	Goals
Atlanta Beat	2001	WUSA	11	2	1	0	12	2
Atlanta Beat	2002	WUSA	18	1	1	0	19	1
Atlanta Beat	Atlanta Beat total		29	3	2	0	31	3
Career total			29	3	2	0	31	3
