= Betsy Barr =

American soccer player

Personal information
- Full name: Betsy Austin Barr
- Date of birth: April 29, 1981 (age 45)
- Place of birth: Long Beach, California
- Height: 1.70 m (5 ft 7 in)
- Position: Midfielder

College career
Years	Team	Apps	(Gls)
1999–2002	Portland Pilots		

Senior career*
Years	Team	Apps	(Gls)
2003	San Jose CyberRays	20	(1)
- * Club domestic league appearances and goals

Betsy Austin Barr (born April 29, 1981) is a retired American soccer player who played for the San Jose CyberRays in the WUSA.

== Soccer career ==
Barr attended University of Portland and played for their women's soccer team Portland Pilots,

Barr was a second-round pick in the 2003 WUSA Draft for the San Jose CyberRays. Barr played for CyberRays for one season, after the collapse of the WUSA Barr continued her professional soccer career with the California Storm in the Women's Premier Soccer League.

== Personal life ==
Betsy Barr is the daughter of Major League Baseball pitcher Jim Barr and her sister is Emmy Barr who also was a professional soccer player.

== Honors ==
Portland Pilots

- NCAA Division I women's soccer tournament: 2002
