= Natasha Anasi =

Icelandic footballer (born 1991)

Personal information
- Full name: Natasha Moraa Anasi
- Date of birth: 2 October 1991 (age 35)
- Place of birth: Irving, Texas, United States
- Height: 1.68 m (5 ft 6 in)
- Positions: Defender; midfielder

Youth career
- Martin High School

College career
Years	Team	Apps	(Gls)
2010–2013	Duke Blue Devils	97	(4)

Senior career*
Years	Team	Apps	(Gls)
2014–2016	ÍBV	44	(6)
2017–2021	Keflavík	72	(34)
2022	Breiðablik	18	(3)
2023–2024	Brann	12	(0)
2024–2025	Valur	11	(0)
2026–	Grindavík/Njarðvík	19	(3)

International career^{‡}
2012	United States U23		
2020–2025	Iceland	9	(1)
- * Club domestic league appearances and goals as of 19 October 2026 ‡ National team caps and goals as of 19 October 2026

Natasha Moraa Anasi-Erlingsson (born 2 October 1991) is a former professional footballer who played as a defender.

Born and raised in the United States, Anasi played college football for the Duke Blue Devils before moving to Iceland in 2014, where she joined Úrvalsdeild kvenna club ÍBV. She moved to fellow Icelandic club Keflavík ÍF in 2017. After receiving Icelandic citizenship in December 2019, Anasi made her international debut for the Iceland national team in March 2020.

== Early life ==
Anasi was born on 2 October 1991, in Irving, Texas, to John and Jane Anasi. She has two brothers, one younger (Andre) and one older (Kevin), and a younger sister (Stephanie). She is of Kenyan descent.

== College career ==
From 2010 to 2013, Anasi played college football for the Duke Blue Devils. During the four seasons, she appeared in 97 games, netting 4 goals. In 2011, she was named the Atlantic Coast Conference Defensive Player of the Year.

== Club career ==
Anasi joined ÍBV in 2014 and played with the team for three seasons. In 2016, she helped ÍBV to the Icelandic Cup final where the team lost to Breiðablik. In 2017, she joined Keflavík. After playing the majority of her career as a defender, she moved to the midfielder position after joining Keflavík.

In November 2021, Anasi signed with Úrvalsdeild club Breiðablik.

In October 2022, Anasi signed with Brann and formally joined the team on 1 January 2023. She missed most of the 2023 season due to an achilles injury.

In July 2024, Anasi returned to Iceland and signed with Valur.

== International career ==
Anasi trained with the United States U-18 team during the spring of 2010. She trained with the United States U-23 team in the spring of 2012 and 2013. The later year, she traveled with the U-23 team to La Manga, Spain, to play in the Four Nations Tournament.

In 2019, Anasi received an Icelandic citizenship and in February 2020, she was selected to the Icelandic national team for the first time. On 4 March 2020, Anasi made her senior debut for Iceland in a 1–0 friendly win against Northern Ireland. On 20 February 2022, she scored her first goal for Iceland when she scored the first goal in Iceland's 2–1 victory against Czech Republic. Her first start for Iceland came in a 3–0 victory against Germany on 12 July 2024.

On 13 June 2025, Anasi was called up to the Iceland squad for the UEFA Women's Euro 2025.

== Personal life ==
Anasi is married to Icelandic basketball coach Rúnar Ingi Erlingsson.

== Career statistics ==
No.	Date	Venue	Opponent	Score	Result	Competition
1.	20 February 2022	Dignity Health Sports Park, Carson, United States	Czech Republic	1–0	2–1	2022 SheBelieves Cup
