= Emmy Barr =

American soccer player

Personal information
- Date of birth: August 16, 1974 (age 52)
- Place of birth: San Mateo, California
- Height: 1.73 m (5 ft 8 in)
- Position: Defender

College career
Years	Team	Apps	(Gls)
1994–1996	Santa Clara Broncos		

Senior career*
Years	Team	Apps	(Gls)
2001–2003	Washington Freedom	51	(2)
- * Club domestic league appearances and goals

Emmy Barr (born August 16, 1974) is a retired American soccer player who played in the Women's United Soccer Association (WUSA) for the Washington Freedom. Prior to becoming a professional soccer player Barr was a preschool teacher who had graduated from Santa Clara University. Emmy Barr was a 5th round pick in the 2000 WUSA Draft.

== Personal life ==
Emmy Barr is the daughter of Major League Baseball pitcher Jim Barr and her sister is Betsy Barr who also was a professional soccer player.
