= Lindsay Stoecker =

American soccer player (born 1978)

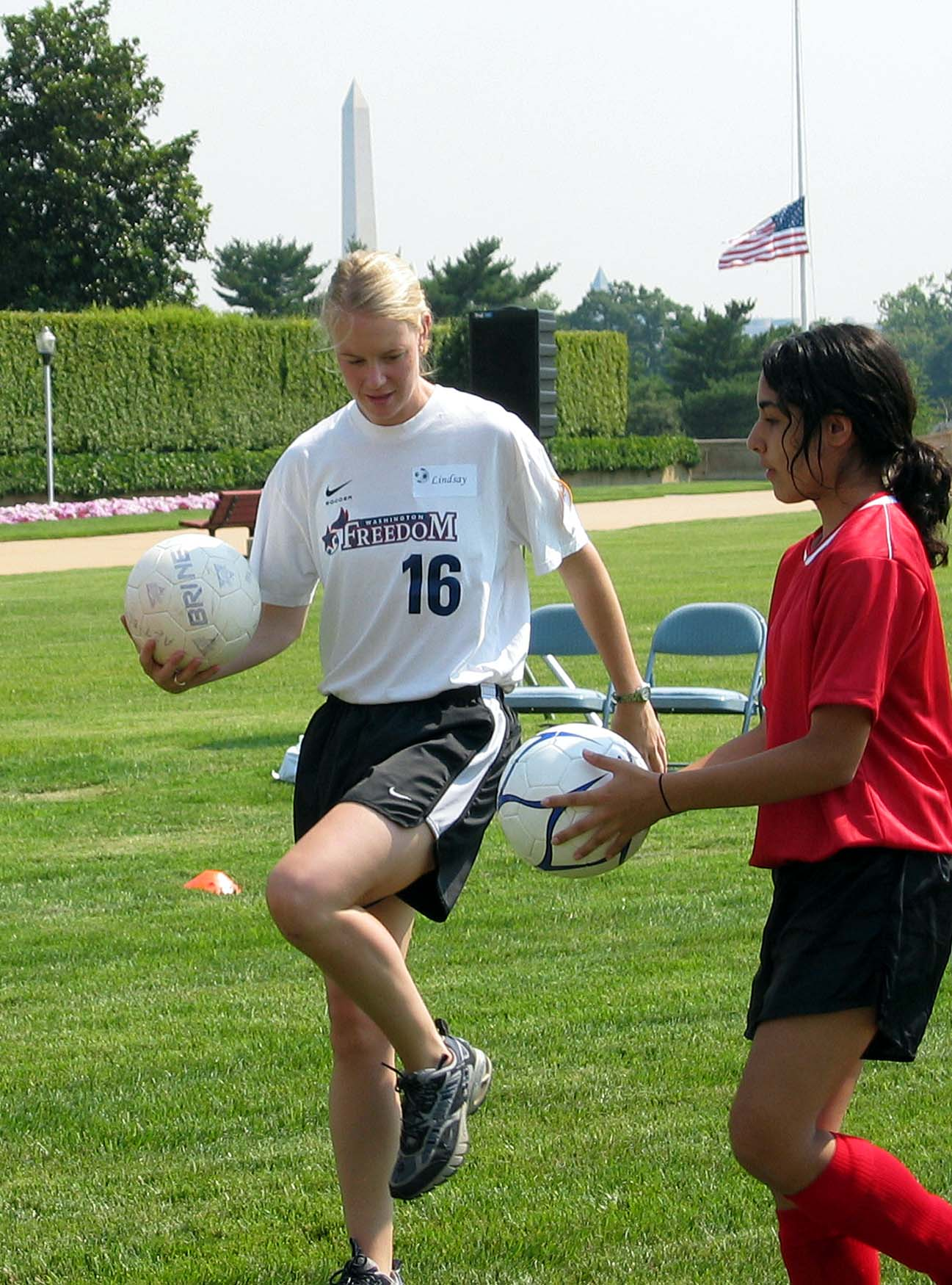
- Teaching soccer to an Afghan girl in June 2004

Personal information
- Full name: Lindsay Sue Stoecker
- Date of birth: April 26, 1978 (age 48)
- Place of birth: Lafayette, Indiana, United States
- Height: 5 ft 10 in (1.78 m)
- Positions: Centre-back; defensive midfielder

Youth career
- 1995: 1977 Raleigh Spartans

College career
Years	Team	Apps	(Gls)
1996–1999	North Carolina Tar Heels		

Senior career*
Years	Team	Apps	(Gls)
2001–2003	Washington Freedom	53	(4)
- * Club domestic league appearances and goals as of 14:37, 30 April 2016 (UTC) ‡ National team caps and goals as of 14:37, 30 April 2016 (UTC)

Lindsay Sue Stoecker (born April 26, 1978) is an American former professional soccer player. A 5 ft 10 in (1.78 m) tall defender or midfielder, she represented Washington Freedom of Women's United Soccer Association (WUSA).

== Club career ==
Stoecker was Washington Freedom's second draft pick ahead of the inaugural 2001 season of the Women's United Soccer Association (WUSA). She missed part of the 2002 season with an anterior cruciate ligament injury. In 2003, Stoecker was part of the Freedom team who won the Founders Cup, but when the league subsequently folded she began working for a consultancy firm.

== International career ==
In August 2001, United States national team coach April Heinrichs called up Stoecker to a 24-player preliminary roster for the 2001 Women's U.S. Cup.
