= Meredith Beard =

American soccer player (born 1979)

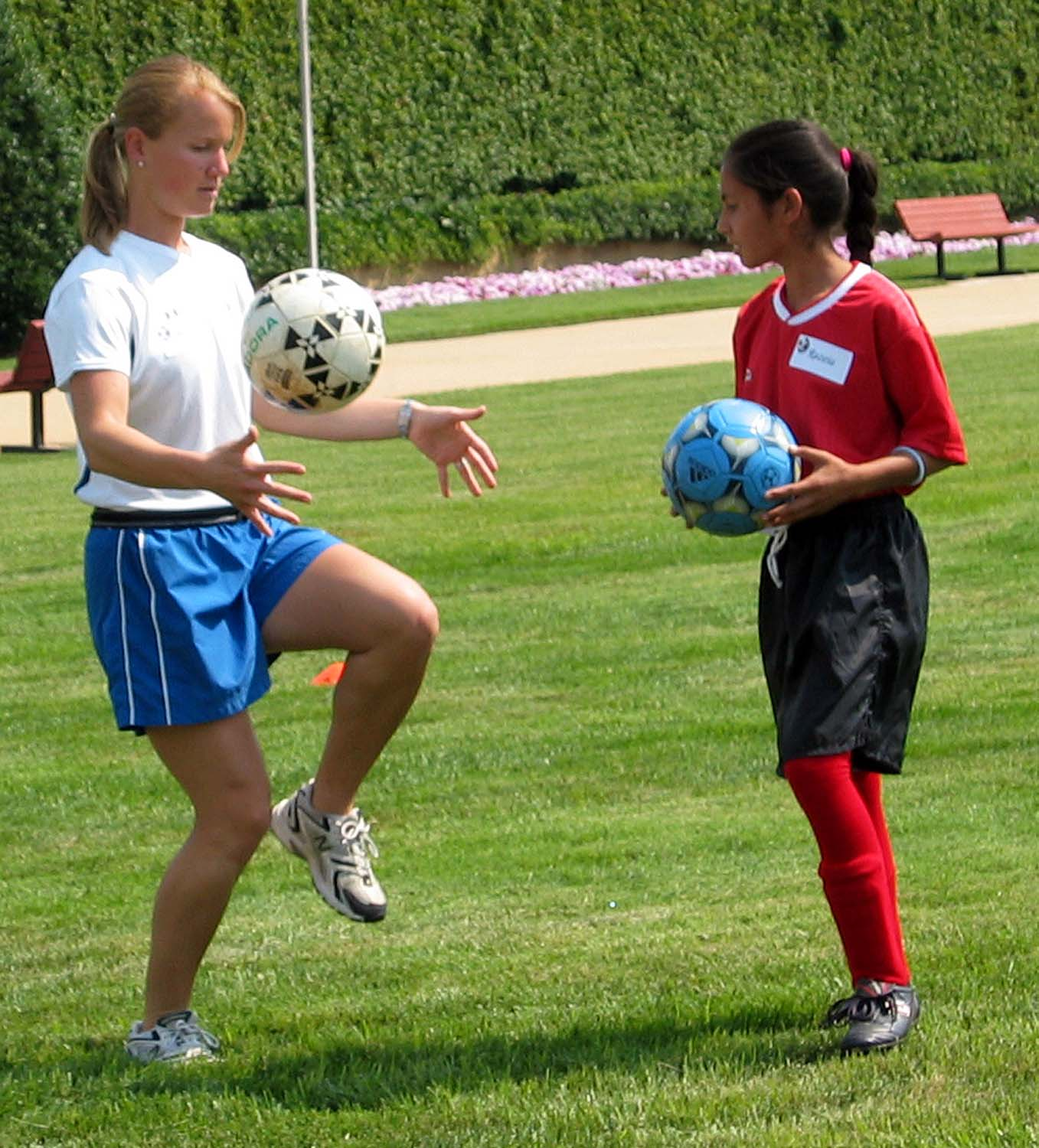
- Teaching soccer to an Afghan girl in June 2004

Personal information
- Full name: Meredith Grace Beard
- Birth name: Meredith Grace Florance
- Date of birth: May 10, 1979 (age 47)
- Place of birth: Dallas, United States
- Height: 5 ft 7 in (1.70 m)
- Position: Forward

Youth career
- 1994–1996: Dallas Sting

College career
Years	Team	Apps	(Gls)
1997–2000	North Carolina Tar Heels		

Senior career*
Years	Team	Apps	(Gls)
2001	Carolina Courage	20	(2)
2002–2003	Washington Freedom	19	(1)

International career
1999–2001	United States	3	(0)
- * Club domestic league appearances and goals

Meredith Grace Beard (née Florance; born May 10, 1979) is an American former professional soccer player. A forward, she represented the Carolina Courage and the Washington Freedom of Women's United Soccer Association (WUSA). She won three caps for the United States national team.

== College career ==
As a senior at North Carolina, she won the Honda Sports Award as the nation's top soccer player.

== Club career ==
Beard was the Carolina Courage's second draft pick ahead of the inaugural 2001 season of the Women's United Soccer Association (WUSA). Ahead of the 2002 season she joined the Washington Freedom as a free agent. She was mainly a substitute at the Freedom, as coach Jim Gabarra preferred to field celebrated forwards Mia Hamm and Abby Wambach.

In 2003, Beard's Freedom team won the Founders Cup, but she did not play in the post-season fixtures. When WUSA subsequently folded, she began working for a kitchen and bathroom showroom.

== International career ==
In February 1999, Beard won her first cap for the United States national team. She played the second half of a 3–1 behind closed doors win over Finland in Orlando. She played two more matches for the national team in January 2001, both against China.

== Personal life ==
In February 2002 she married Ryan Beard.
