= Kerry Gragg =

Retired American soccer player

Personal information
- Date of birth: August 7, 1972 (age 54)
- Place of birth: Atlanta, United States
- Height: 1.70 m (5 ft 7 in)
- Position: Midfielder

College career
Years	Team	Apps	(Gls)
- UNC Greensboro Spartans

Senior career*
Years	Team	Apps	(Gls)
- Atlanta Beat
- * Club domestic league appearances and goals

Kerry Powell Gragg is a retired American soccer player who used to play for the Atlanta Beat of the Women's United Soccer Association (WUSA). Gragg was the 55th pick at 2001 WUSA supplemental draft.
