= Derry Township School District =

School district in Pennsylvania

Coordinates: 40.27389°N 76.65264°W

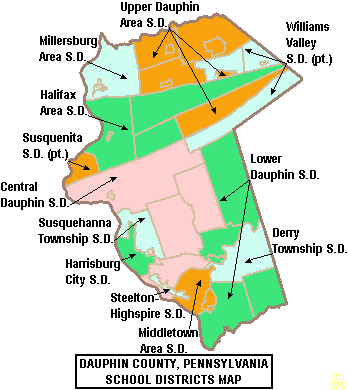
- Location of Derry Township School District in Dauphin County, Pennsylvania

Address
- 30 East Granada Avenue, P.O. Box 898 Hershey, Dauphin County, Pennsylvania, 17033; United States

District information
- Type: Public
- Grades: K-12

Students and staff
- District mascot: Trojans

Other information
- Website: www.hershey.k12.pa.us

The Derry Township School District is a midsized, suburban public school district which serves Derry Township in Dauphin County, Pennsylvania. The district includes the unincorporated Village of Hershey. Derry Township School District encompasses approximately 27 square miles (70 km^{2}). According to 2000 federal census data, it serves a resident population of 21,273. By 2010, the district's population increased to 24,690 people. The educational attainment levels for the Derry Township School District population (25 years old and over) were 94% high school graduates and 51.4% college graduates. Pennsylvania State University's Hershey Medical Center is located within the district boundaries. Derry Township School District is one of the 500 public school districts of Pennsylvania.

According to the Pennsylvania Budget and Policy Center, 13.6% of the district's pupils lived at 185% or below the Federal Poverty level as shown by their eligibility for the federal free or reduced price school meal programs in 2012. In 2009, Derry Township School District residents' per capita income was $16,811, while the median family income was $40,063. In the Commonwealth, the median family income was $49,501 and the United States median family income was $49,445, in 2010. In Dauphin County, the median household income was $52,371. By 2013, the median household income in the United States rose to $52,100.

Per school district officials, in school year 2007–08, Derry Township School District provided basic educational services to 3,492 pupils through the employment of 267 teachers, 216 full-time and part-time support personnel, and 21 administrators. In 2009–10, the district's enrollment was reported as 3,543 pupils. The district employed: 274 teachers, 219 full-time and part-time support personnel, and 21 administrators during the 2009–10 school year. Derry Township School District received $6.7 million in state funding in the 2009–10 school year.

Derry Township School District operates three schools: Hershey High School (9th-12th), Hershey Middle School (6th-8th) and Hershey Elementary School (K-5th), which includes the Early Childhood Center . High school students may choose to attend Dauphin County Technical School for training in the construction and mechanical trades.

Derry Township School District is served by the Capital Area Intermediate Unit 15 which offers a variety of services, including a completely developed K-12 curriculum that is mapped and aligned with the Pennsylvania Academic Standards (available online), shared services, a group purchasing program and a wide variety of special education and special needs services.

== Extracurriculars ==
Derry Township School District offers a wide variety of clubs, activities and sports.

=== Sports ===
The Derry Township School District funds:

Boys

- Baseball - AAAA
- Basketball- AAAA
- Cross country - AAA
- Football - AAA
- Golf - AAAA
- Indoor track and field - AAAA
- Lacrosse - AAAA
- Soccer - AAA
- Swimming and diving - AAA
- Tennis - AAA
- Track and field - AAA
- Volleyball - AAA
- Wrestling - AAA

Girls

- Basketball - AAAA
- Cheer - AAAA
- Cross country - AAA
- Indoor track and field - AAAA
- Field hockey - AAA
- Lacrosse - AAAA
- Soccer (Fall) - AAA
- Softball - AAAA
- Swimming and diving - AAA
- Tennis - AAA
- Track and field - AAA
- Volleyball - AAA

Middle school sports

Boys

- Baseball
- Cross country
- Football
- Soccer
- Track and field
- Wrestling

Girls

- Basketball
- Cross country
- Field hockey
- Track and field
- Volleyball

According to PIAA directory July 2013

== National recognition ==
On April 14, 2013, it was announced that Derry Township School District had been named a grand prize winner of the 19th annual Magna Awards program in the enrollment category of under 5,000 students. The Magna Awards program, sponsored by the National School Boards Association's (NSBA) American School Board Journal (ASBJ) and supported by Sodexo, recognizes districts across the country for outstanding programs that advance student learning and encourage community involvement in schools. Derry Township received a $4,000 contribution at NSBA's 73rd Annual Conference in San Diego. DTSD won the grand prize for its COCOA Principles program which aims to prepare students to be global citizens. COCOA Principles, which stands for Community, Opportunity, Citizenship, Ownership and Academics, has encouraged the entire community, not just students to be more inclusive, respectful and responsible citizens. Students seen reflecting the program's principles are nominated for awards and high school graduation projects must identify the COCOA principle the student is modeling.
