= Allie Kemp =

American soccer player (born 1975)

Personal information
- Birth name: Allison Cheree Kemp
- Date of birth: January 18, 1975 (age 51)
- Place of birth: Mission Viejo, California, United States
- Height: 5 ft 3 in (1.60 m)
- Position: Forward

College career
Years	Team	Apps	(Gls)
1993–1996	California Golden Bears		

Senior career*
Years	Team	Apps	(Gls)
2001–2002	Boston Breakers	32	(2)
2003	San Diego Spirit	17	(1)
- * Club domestic league appearances and goals

Allie Kemp Sullivan (born January 18, 1975, in Mission Viejo, California) is a retired American soccer player who played for the Boston Breakers.

== Early life and education ==
Kemp was born in Mission Viejo, California on January 18, 1975. She graduated from the University of California, Berkeley.

== Career ==
=== Athletics ===
While studying at the University of California, Berkeley, Kemp played for the school's women's soccer team. During her tenure, she was selected as a member for the ALL-Pac 10 Conference team (1996), as well as the American Umbro All-West team.

From 2001 to 2002, she played for the Boston Breakers, then joined the San Diego Spirit the following season before the Women's United Soccer Association folded.

=== Teaching ===
Kemp taught first grade at Ocean Knoll Elementary School in Encinitas, California before being drafted to play for the Boston Breakers.
