= Jaclyn Raveia =

Retired American soccer player (born 1979)

Personal information
- Date of birth: November 28, 1979 (age 46)
- Place of birth: Fairfax, Virginia, United States
- Position: Defender

College career
| Years | Team | Apps | (Gls) |
| 1997–2000 | Richmond Spiders | | |

Senior career*
| Years | Team | Apps | (Gls) |
| 2001 | Carolina Courage | 7 | (0) |
| 2002–2003 | New York Power | 30 | (3) |
- * Club domestic league appearances and goals

Jaclyn Raveia Schmitt (born November 28, 1979) is a retired American soccer player who played for New York Power.

== Early life and education ==
Raveia Schmitt was born November 28, 1979, in Fairfax, Virginia. She attended Wilbert Tucker Woodson High School. She graduated from the University of Richmond in 2000.

== Soccer career ==
=== Before university ===
In 1997, Raveia Schmitt was "one of six Washington area girls chosen for an Olympic development soccer team scheduled to play five exhibition matches during a 12-day trip".

=== University ===
Raveia Schmitt played for the University of Richmond for four years, serving as team captain for her final two. In both 1999 and 2000, she was named the CAA Defender of the Year; in 2000, the National Soccer Coaches Association of America (NSCAA) named her first-team All-America and the Women's Collegiate Soccer Scholar-Athlete of the Year.

=== Professional ===
In 2001, Raveia Schmitt was drafted to play for the Carolina Courage in the second round of the Women's United Soccer Association's college draft, becoming the first player from the University of Richmond to be drafted to play women's soccer professionally.

The following year, Raveia Schmitt transferred to the New York Power, where she played for the following two seasons.

== Honors ==
Raveia Schmitt was inducted into the University of Richmond Athletic Hall of Fame in 2008.
