= Carly Smolak =

American soccer player

Personal information
- Date of birth: August 13, 1979 (age 47)
- Place of birth: Lake Oswego, Oregon, United States
- Height: 5 ft 10 in (1.78 m)
- Position: Goalkeeper

College career
Years	Team	Apps	(Gls)
1997–2000	Stanford Cardinal		

Senior career*
Years	Team	Apps	(Gls)
2001	Philadelphia Charge		
2001–2002	San Diego Spirit	11	(0)
2003	New York Power	9	(0)
- * Club domestic league appearances and goals

Carly Smolak (born August 13, 1979, in Lake Oswego, Oregon) is a retired American soccer player who played in the Women's United Soccer Association (WUSA). She is now a coach.

== Early life and education ==
Smolak was born in Lake Oswego, Oregon on August 13, 1979. She attended Lake Oswego High School and Stanford University, graduating in 2000. She later received a Master of Business Administration from the same university.

== Career ==
=== Athletic career ===
While studying at Stanford University, Smolak played for the school's soccer team. Upon graduation, she was ranked second in the university's history for minutes played (6142) and saves (247).

Upon WUSA's in 2000, Smolak was drafted in the tenth round to play for the Philadelphia Charge. She transferred to the San Diego Spirit in 2001, where she remained for two seasons before playing for the New York Power. WUSA folded in 2003.

Following her time in WUSA, Smolak began playing Australian rules football, playing as a centre half-forward for the USA Freedom and San Francisco Iron Maidens. While playing for the latter, the team won two national championships.

=== Coaching ===
Smolak has served as the head coach for the San Francisco Iron Maidens, during which the team won two national championships.

As of August 2023, she was senior coach for the USA Freedom.

== Entrepreneurship ==
Smolak is the co-founder and CEO of the San Diego Canine Club.
