= Gao Hong (footballer) =

Association footballer

Personal information
- Full name: Gao Hong
- Date of birth: 27 November 1967 (age 58)
- Place of birth: Taixing, China
- Height: 1.72 m (5 ft 8 in)
- Position: Goalkeeper

Senior career*
Years	Team	Apps	(Gls)
–2000	Guangdong FC		
2001–2002	New York Power	25	(0)

International career
1989–200?	China		
Medal record
Women's football
Representing China
Olympic Games
Silver medal – second place	1996 Atlanta	Team
Asian Games
Gold medal – first place	1998 Bangkok	Team
FIFA Women's World Cup
Runner-up	1999 United States
- * Club domestic league appearances and goals

Gao Hong (simplified Chinese: 高红; traditional Chinese: 高紅; pinyin: Gāo Hóng; born 27 November 1967) is a Chinese former footballer who played as a goalkeeper. She competed in the 1996 Summer Olympics and in the 2000 Summer Olympics. She also played professionally for the New York Power of the Women's United Soccer Association in 2001 and 2002.

In 1996 she won the silver medal with the Chinese team. She played all five matches as goalkeeper.

Four years later she was a member of the Chinese team which finished fifth in the women's tournament. She played all three matches as goalkeeper.

Hong played as goalkeeper for the Chinese team at the 1999 FIFA Women's World Cup.

She is known to stare down her opponents. Brandi Chastain recalled Hong's ability to psych her out. Chastain attributed Hong's ability to a lost goal, saying "She got in my head and as I approached the ball I was thinking more about her than about what I should be doing."

Hong began playing soccer at 18 when her supervisor at the factory she worked at made her join the factory's team. After her experience playing for her factory's team, she continued to play on a city team. Later, she began to compete professionally.

After the 1999 FIFA Women's World Cup, Hong left China to play for New York Power, an American professional soccer team in the Women's United Soccer Association. During her inaugural season for New York Power, Gao Hong recorded 87 saves with a 1.11 goals against average (GAA).
