= 2002 WUSA Founders Cup =

Championship match of Women's United Soccer Association

- Event: 2002 WUSA season
Carolina Courage	Washington Freedom
3	2
- Date: August 24, 2002
- Venue: Herndon Stadium, Atlanta, Georgia
- Player of the Match: Birgit Prinz (Carolina)
- Referee: Ricardo Salazar
- Attendance: 15,321
- Weather: Partly cloudy 94 °F (34 °C)

The 2002 WUSA Founders Cup, also known as Founders Cup II, was the second championship match in Women's United Soccer Association history, played between the Carolina Courage and the Washington Freedom to decide the champion of the league's inaugural season. The game was played at Herndon Stadium in Atlanta, Georgia on August 24, 2002, with 15,321 in attendance.

The Carolina Courage defeated the Freedom 3–2. Carolina midfielder Birgit Prinz was named player of the match for scoring the winning goal and assisting on another. She had won the UEFA Women's Cup with 1. FFC Frankfurt earlier in the year and scored in the final.

== Pre-match ==
Ticket prices for the final started at $15 and were also available at $30 and $45, with a discount for group purchases. The game was broadcast live to a national audience via PAX TV in the United States and several other countries.

== Match ==
August 24, 2002
14: 00 EDT

Carolina Courage	3–2	Washington Freedom
Riise 20'; Fotopoulos 53'; Prinz 58'	Report	Fotopoulos 31' (o.g.); Hamm 64'

Herndon Stadium,
Atlanta, Georgia
Attendance: 15,321
Referee: Ricardo Salazar
