= New York Power =

- Full name: New York Power
- Nickname: Power
- Founded: 2000
- Dissolved: 2003
- Stadium: Mitchel Athletic Complex, Uniondale, New York
- Owner: Time Warner Cable
- General Manager: Susan Marenoff
- Head Coach: Tom Sermanni
- League: Women's United Soccer Association

The New York Power was an American professional soccer team that played in the Women's United Soccer Association (WUSA), the first professional soccer league for women in the United States. The team played at Mitchel Athletic Complex in Uniondale, New York. The team played from 2001 to 2003 when the league ceased operations.

== History ==
On February 15, 2000, it was announced that the first professional women's soccer league would be formed by a number of major U.S. media companies and individual investors in response to the successful and hugely popular U.S. women's national soccer team who had won the 1999 FIFA Women's World Cup. Time Warner Cable invested $5,000,000 for the operating rights for a team in the New York market. In addition to the upfront financial investment, league investors also provided resources for staff, facilities, and promotional efforts via cable television.

=== Team name and stadium unveiled ===
On November 16, 2000, the league announced the names of the eight teams admitted in the league. The New York Power was announced as the team name for the New York area with games to be played at the 10,000 capacity Mitchel Athletic Complex, a multi-purpose athletic facility located in Uniondale, New York. The team name was selected by team's front office with the slogan "Get emPOWERed" used in promotional materials.

=== Inaugural season ===
The Power began play in 2001 during the inaugural season of the WUSA. The team finished the regular season with a 9–7–5 record third in the standings. They reached the semi-finals in the playoffs where they faced the Bay Area CyberRays and lost 3–2. Average attendance for the club's home games during the 2001 season was 5,724. Tiffeny Milbrett was the leading scorer on the team with 16 goals on the season. She also led the team in points (35), shots (73), shots on goal (42), and game-winning goals (4). Goalkeeper Gao Hong recorded 87 saves with a 1.11 goals against average (GAA).

=== 2002 season ===
During the league's second season, the Power finished last in the regular season standings with a 3–17–1 record. The club had a rough time recovering from a number of injuries and the retirement of Norwegian defender Gro Espeseth, who departed after the inaugural season. Goalkeeper Gao Hong, defender Christie Pearce and defender-midfielder Sara Whalen all suffered injuries destabilizing the team. In July, head coach Pat Farmer was fired after the team lost many more games than it won or tied. Assistant coach and former Rutgers University coach Charles Duccilli was named head coach. The team's general manager, Susan Marenoff, said of the coaching swap, "The team needed a change ... Pat worked very hard to make the best team he could. I really think we needed a different style, and that's what we've accomplished."

=== 2003 season ===
The Power re-surged during the 2003 season to finish fifth among the league's eight teams, narrowly missing the playoffs. Australia women's national team coach and San Jose CyberRays assistant coach, Tom Sermanni, was named head coach during the 2002 postseason. The Power finished the regular season with a 7–9–5 record. Forward Christie Welsh led the team in goals with six while midfielder Shannon Boxx led in assists with eight. Inaugural season star Tiffeny Milbrett ranked second on the team for goals (5) and assists (6) and led the team in shots (51), shots on goal (22) and points (16). Goalkeeper Saskia Webber made 50 saves during her 13 appearances for the club recording a 1.52 goals against average (GAA).

== Year-by-year ==
Year	League	Regular season	Playoffs	Avg. attendance
2001	WUSA	3rd Place	Semi-finals	5,724
2002	WUSA	8th place	Did not qualify	5,575
2003	WUSA	5th place	Did not qualify	4,249

== Players ==
The "founding players" of the Power were Tiffeny Milbrett, Christie Pearce and Sara Whalen of the 1999 U.S. Women's World Cup team. International players who played for the Power included Ann Kristin Aarønes (Norway), Gro Espeseth (Norway), Gao Hong (China), Cheryl Salisbury (Australia) and Anita Rapp (Norway).

2003 Roster

Note: Flags indicate national team as defined under FIFA eligibility rules; some limited exceptions apply. Players may hold more than one non-FIFA nationality.

No.	Pos.	Nation	Player
0	FW	USA	Christie Welsh
1	GK	USA	Saskia Webber
2	DF	USA	Kristy Whelchel
3	DF	USA	Christie Pearce
5	MF	USA	Shannon Boxx
6	FW	USA	Heather Beem
7	DF	USA	Sara Whalen
8	DF	AUS	Cheryl Salisbury
9	DF	USA	Lindsey Jones
10	MF	NOR	Anita Rapp

No.	Pos.	Nation	Player
11	MF	USA	Emily Janss
12	MF	USA	Krista Davey
13	GK	USA	Carly Smolak
14	MF	AUS	Joanne Peters
15	FW	USA	Tiffeny Milbrett
16	MF	USA	Tammy Pearman
17	MF	USA	Justi Baumgardt-Yamada
19	DF	USA	Jaclyn Raveia
25	MF	USA	Margaret Tietjen

Coach: Tom Sermanni

== Coaches ==
- Pat Farmer (2001–02)
- Charles Duccilli (2002)
- Tom Sermanni (2003)

== Awards ==
The New York Power received the WUSA Team Fair Play Award during the 2001 season. Tiffeny Milbrett received the WUSA Most Valuable Player and WUSA Offensive Player of the Year the same year. Gro Espeseth and Tiffeny Milbrett were named to the WUSA Global XI First Team in 2001.

In 2003, Coach Tom Sermanni was one of three nominees for Coach of the Year.

== League suspension ==
The WUSA announced on September 15, 2003 that it was suspending operations.

== See also ==
- Women's professional sports
- List of soccer clubs in the United States
- Women's association football
