= Raleigh Wings =

- Full name: Raleigh Wings
- Founded: 1998
- Dissolved: 2000
- Stadium: WRAL Soccer Center, Raleigh, North Carolina
- Capacity: 3,200
- Owner: Team Soccer, Inc.
- General manager: Dr. Hugo Uyttenhove
- Head coach: (United States) Bill Palladino
- League: USL W-League
- Website: https://web.archive.org/web/20000605115511/http://www.raleighwings.com/

Raleigh Wings was a W-League women's soccer club based out of Raleigh, North Carolina. The team began play in 1998 and folded after the 2000 season.

== History ==
The club was founded in 1998 by the owners of the professional A-League club Raleigh Flyers. In their inaugural season the team amassed a 17–0–0 record, and won the W-1 Championship by beating the Boston Renegades 4–3 at Bowditch Field before 2,180 spectators.

Before the 1999 FIFA Women's World Cup, Raleigh Wings played exhibition games against the national teams of Brazil (a 2–1 defeat) and Russia (a 1–0 win). They retained the W-1 Championship by beating the Chicago Cobras in a shootout after a 2–2 draw in front of a club record 2,260 home crowd at WRAL Soccer Center.

In 2000, Raleigh Wings went 12–1–1 but were defeated by Chicago Cobras in the W-1 Championship final. They lost 4–2 on penalties after a 1–1 draw at WRAL Soccer Center. The club then folded due to the creation of Carolina Courage to play in the Women's United Soccer Association.

== Year-by-year ==
Year	Division	League	Reg. season	Playoffs	Avg. attendance
1998	1	USL W-League	1st, South	Champion	855
1999	1	USL W-League	1st, South	Champion	660
2000	1	USL W-League	1st, South	Final	669
