= 2003 Philadelphia Charge season =

2003 season of American women's association football team

Philadelphia Charge
2003 season
- General manager: Tim Murphy
- Head coach: Mark Krikorian
- Stadium: Villanova Stadium
- WUSA: 8th
- WUSA PLayoffs: Did not qualify
- Top goalscorer: Marinette Pichon (14)
- Highest home attendance: 8,602 (May 3 vs. New York)
- Lowest home attendance: 4,180 (May 31 vs. Carolina)
- Average home league attendance: 6,764
- Biggest win: 3–0 (Aug 2 vs. Atlanta)
- Biggest defeat: 1–4 (May 10 vs. Freedom)

The 2003 season was the Philadelphia Charge's third and final season competing in the Women's United Soccer Association league, the top division of women's soccer in the United States. The team was coached by Mark Krikorian.

== Club ==
=== Roster ===
The first-team roster of Philadelphia Charge.

Note: Flags indicate national team as defined under FIFA eligibility rules; some limited exceptions apply. Players may hold more than one non-FIFA nationality.

No.	Pos.	Nation	Player
1	GK	USA	Melissa Moore
2	MF	USA	Lorrie Fair
3	FW	USA	Emily Burt
5	DF	USA	Karyn Hall
6	DF	USA	Jenny Benson
7	MF	FIN	Anne Mäkinen
8	MF	ENG	Kelly Smith
9	MF	CZE	Pavlina Scasna
10	FW	USA	Deliah Arrington
11	FW	FRA	Marinette Pichon
12	MF	USA	Erin Misaki

No.	Pos.	Nation	Player
13	DF	USA	Heather Mitts
14	MF	USA	Rachel Kruze
15	DF	ENG	Stacey Tullock
16	MF	GER	Melanie Hoffmann
18	GK	USA	Hope Solo
19	MF	USA	Alexa Borisjuk
21	FW	USA	Trina Maso de Moya
22	DF	USA	Mary McVeigh
25	DF	USA	Jennifer Tietjen-Prozzo
—	MF	USA	Mary-Frances Monroe

==== Team management ====
Position	Staff Member
Head coach	(United States) Mark Krikorian
Goalkeeping Coach	(United States) Paul Royal

Last updated: April 4, 2020

== Competition ==
=== Regular season ===
April 5 1	San Jose CyberRays	1–0	Philadelphia Charge	San Jose, CA
		Box Score	Barnes 32'	Stadium: Spartan Stadium; Attendance: 6,042; Referee: Mark Arblaster

April 26 2	Philadelphia Charge	1–3	Boston Breakers	Villanova, PA
		Box Score		Stadium: Villanova Stadium

May 3 3	Philadelphia Charge	4–5	New York Power	Villanova, PA
	Pichon 3'; Tullock 23'; Smith 38'; Arrington 54'	Box Score	Baumgardt 6'; Milbrett 25'; Welsh 40', 85'; Davey 91'	Stadium: Villanova Stadium; Attendance: 8,095; Referee: Rachel Woo

May 10 4	Washington Freedom	4–1	Philadelphia Charge	Washington, D.C.
	Wambach 7', 19', 95'; Hamm 79'	Box Score	Tietjen-Prozzo 33'	Stadium: RFK Stadium; Attendance: 5,135; Referee: Kari Seitz

May 17 5	New York Power	1–2	Philadelphia Charge	Uniondale, NY
	Pichon 60', 81'	Box Score	Peters 91'	Stadium: Mitchel Athletic Complex; Attendance: 3,165; Referee: Sandra Hunt

May 24 6	Philadelphia Charge	0–2	San Jose CyberRays	Villanova, PA
		Box Score	Pretinha 40', 61'	Stadium: Villanova Stadium; Attendance: 5,517; Referee: Jennifer Bennett

May 31 7	Philadelphia Charge	2–2	Carolina Courage	Villanova, PA
	Pichon 13', 76'	Box Score	Prinz 44'; Fotopoulos 83'	Stadium: Villanova Stadium; Attendance: 4,180; Referee: Misail Tsapos

June 7 8	San Diego Spirit	1–2	Philadelphia Charge	San Diego, CA
		Box Score		Stadium: Torero Stadium

June 11 9	Philadelphia Charge	0–0	New York Power	Villanova, PA
		Box Score		Stadium: Villanova Stadium

June 14 10	Philadelphia Charge	2–0	San Diego Spirit	Villanova, PA
	Tanaka 12' (o.g.); Pichon 31'	Box Score		Stadium: Villanova Stadium; Attendance: 6,345; Referee: Rachel Woo

June 22 11	Atlanta Beat	4–2	Philadelphia Charge	Atlanta, GA
	Pohlers 31'; Parlow 43', 53', 64'	Box Score	Hoffmann 9'; Pichon 47'	Stadium: Herndon Stadium; Attendance: 5,218; Referee: Todd Perry

June 28 12	Philadelphia Charge	2–2	Boston Breakers	Villanova, PA
	Pichon 25', 84'	Box Score	Mellgren 29'; Gulbrandsen 88'	Stadium: Villanova Stadium; Attendance: 8,021; Referee: Kari Seitz

July 5 13	Philadelphia Charge	1–1	San Diego Spirit	Villanova, PA
	Tullock 92'	Box Score	Latham 80'	Stadium: Villanova Stadium; Attendance: 8,602; Referee: Misail Tsapos

July 9 14	Washington Freedom	4–2	Philadelphia Charge	Washington, D.C.
	Stoecker 5'; Wambach 27', 30'; Lindsey 73'	Box Score	Hoffmann 8'; Tullock 31'	Stadium: RFK Stadium; Attendance: 5,780; Referee: Rachel Woo

July 13 15	Boston Breakers	3–1	Philadelphia Charge	Boston, MA
	Mellgren 16', 45', 65'	Box Score	Borski 81'	Stadium: Nickerson Field; Attendance: 5,060; Referee: Todd Perry

July 16 16	Philadelphia Charge	0–1	Atlanta Beat	Villanova, PA
		Box Score	Pohlers 31'	Stadium: Villanova Stadium; Attendance: 6,587; Referee: Jennifer Bennett

July 20 17	San Jose CyberRays	2–1	Philadelphia Charge	San Jose, CA
	Katia 41'; Barnes 61'	Box Score	Hoffmann 4'	Stadium: Spartan Stadium; Attendance: 5,243; Referee: Jesse Johnson

July 26 18	Philadelphia Charge	1–3	Carolina Courage	Villanova, PA
		Box Score		Stadium: Villanova Stadium

August 2 19	Philadelphia Charge	3–0	Atlanta Beat	Villanova, PA
		Box Score		Stadium: Villanova Stadium

August 6 20	Philadelphia Charge	2–0	Washington Freedom	Villanova, PA
		Box Score		Stadium: Villanova Stadium

August 9 21	Carolina Courage	1–1	Philadelphia Charge	Cary, NC
		Box Score		Stadium: SAS Stadium

==== Results by round ====
Round	1	2	3	4	5	6	7	8	9	10	11	12	13	14	15	16	17	18	19	20	21
Ground	A	H	H	A	A	H	H	A	H	H	A	H	H	A	A	H	A	H	H	H	A
Result	L	L	L	L	W	L	D	W	D	W	L	D	D	L	L	L	L	L	W	W	D

Source: WUSA
A = Away; H = Home; W = Win; D = Draw; L = Loss

==== Home/away results ====
Overall								Home						Away					
Pld	W	D	L	GF	GA	GD	Pts	W	D	L	GF	GA	GD	W	D	L	GF	GA	GD
21	5	5	11	30	40	−10	20	3	4	5	18	19	−1	2	1	6	12	21	−9

Last updated: complete.
Source: WUSA

==== Regular-season standings ====
Pos	Team	Pld	W	D	L	GF	GA	GD	Pts	Qualification
4	Washington Freedom (C)	21	9	4	8	40	31	+9	31	Qualification to playoffs
5	New York Power	21	7	5	9	33	43	−10	26	
6	San Jose CyberRays	21	7	4	10	23	30	−7	25	
7	Carolina Courage	21	7	4	10	31	33	−2	25	
8	Philadelphia Charge	21	5	5	11	30	40	−10	20	

Source: WUSA
(C) Champions

== Statistics ==
As of October 17, 2020

Players without any appearance are not included.

No.	Pos	Nat	Player	Total		WUSA		WUSA Playoffs	
No.	Pos	Nat	Player	Apps	Goals	Apps	Goals	Apps	Goals
Goalkeepers:
1	GK	(United States) USA	Melissa Moore	13	0	13	0	0	0
18	GK	(United States) USA	Hope Solo	8	0	8	0	0	0
Defenders:
5	DF	(United States) USA	Karyn Hall	6	0	0+6	0	0	0
6	DF	(United States) USA	Jenny Benson	20	0	20	0	0	0
13	DF	(United States) USA	Heather Mitts	14	0	14	0	0	0
15	DF	(England) ENG	Stacey Tullock	21	3	21	3	0	0
22	DF	(United States) USA	Mary McVeigh	18	0	16+2	0	0	0
25	MF	(United States) USA	Jennifer Tietjen-Prozzo	21	1	21	1	0	0
Midfielders:
2	MF	(United States) USA	Lorrie Fair	18	0	17+1	0	0	0
7	MF	(Finland) FIN	Anne Mäkinen	17	0	16+1	0	0	0
9	MF	(Czech Republic) CZE	Pavlina Scasna	7	1	3+4	1	0	0
12	MF	(United States) USA	Erin Misaki	14	0	13+1	0	0	0
14	MF	(United States) USA	Rachel Kruze	15	0	11+4	0	0	0
19	MF	(United States) USA	Alexa Borisjuk	2	0	0+2	0	0	0
	MF	(United States) USA	Mary-Frances Monroe	1	0	1	0	0	0
Forwards:
3	FW	(United States) USA	Emily Burt	15	2	12+3	2	0	0
8	MF	(England) ENG	Kelly Smith	7	4	7	4	0	0
10	FW	(United States) USA	Deliah Arrington	5	1	4+1	1	0	0
11	FW	(France) FRA	Marinette Pichon	18	14	18	14	0	0
16	FW	(Germany) GER	Melanie Hoffmann	20	5	19+1	5	0	0
21	FW	(United States) USA	Trina Maso de Moya	9	0	1+8	0	0	0

- Source: https://www.statscrew.com/womenssoccer/stats/t-WPHC/y-2003 StatsCrew.com

=== Goalkeepers ===
As of October 17, 2020

Nat.	No.	Player	Apps	Starts	Record	GA	GAA	SO	Booked	Sent off (straight red)
(United States)	1	Melissa Moore	13	13	2–7–4	30	2.31	2	0	0
(United States)	18	Hope Solo	8	8	3–4–1	10	1.25	2	0	0
Total					5-11-5	40	1.90	4	0	0

Record = W-L-D

== Transfers ==
=== In ===
Date	Player	Position	Previous club	Fee/notes
February 2, 2003	(United States) Hope Solo	GK	University of Washington	2003 WUSA Draft, Round 1, Pick 4, 4th Overall
February 2, 2003	(United States) Deliah Arrington	FW	(United States) Clemson University	2003 WUSA Draft, Round 1, Pick 6, 6th Overall
February 2, 2003	(United States) Mary McVeigh	MF	(United States) Dartmouth College	2003 WUSA Draft, Round 1, Pick 7, 7th Overall
February 2, 2003	(United States) Erin Misaki	MF	(United States) University of Portland	2003 WUSA Draft, Round 2, Pick 6, 14th Overall
February 2, 2003	(United States) Rachel Kruze	MF	(United States) West Virginia University	2003 WUSA Draft, Round 4, Pick 6, 30th Overall
March 25, 2003	(United States) Trina Maso de Moya	FW	(United States) Florida Atlantic University	
March 2003	(Germany) Melanie Hoffmann	MF	(Germany) FCR 2001 Duisburg	
	(Finland) Anne Mäkinen	MF	(United States) Washington Freedom	Free agent
	(United States) Emily Burt	FW	(United States) Atlanta Beat	

=== Out ===
Date	Player	Position	Destination club	Fee/notes
August 17, 2002	(China) Liu Ailing	MF	N/A	Retired
October 1, 2002	(United States) Mandy Clemens	FW	(United States) San Jose CyberRays	Trade for First round draft pick
	(United States) Andrea Alfiler	MF	(United States) San Diego Spirit	
	(United States) Kerry Connors	MF	(United States) San Diego Spirit	
	(United States) Erica Iverson	DF		
	(United States) Tara Koleski	FW		
	(China) Zhao Lihong	MF		
	(United States) Erin Martin	FW		
	(United States) Rebekah McDowell	MF	(United States) Boston Breakers	
	(United States) Janel Schillig	GK		Released
	(United States) Maite Zabala	GK	(United States) Carolina Courage	
