= Lauren Hanson =

American former soccer player and coach (born 1981)

Personal information
- Full name: Lauren Orlandos Hanson
- Birth name: Lauren Michelle Orlandos
- Date of birth: July 16, 1981 (age 45)
- Place of birth: Newport Beach, California, U.S.
- Height: 5 ft 10 in (1.78 m)
- Position: Defender

Youth career
- –1999: Mission Viejo SC Mirage
- –1999: El Toro Chargers

College career
Years	Team	Apps	(Gls)
1999–2002	Portland Pilots	81	(7)

Senior career*
Years	Team	Apps	(Gls)
2003	New York Power	18	(0)

International career
1996	United States U16		
1998	United States U18		
1999–2000	United States U21		
2001	United States	1	(0)

Managerial career
- 2004–2007: Portland Pilots (assistant)
- 2004–200?: FC Portland Academy
- 2009–2011: Oregon Ducks (associate HC)
- 2013: Marist Spartans
- 2014–2022: San Jose State Spartans
- * Club domestic league appearances and goals

Lauren Orlandos Hanson (born Lauren Michelle Orlandos; July 16, 1981) is an American former soccer player and soccer coach who played as a defender, making one appearance for the United States women's national team. She was previously the head women’s soccer coach at San José State University. She became the “winningest coach” in San José State women's soccer history in 2017 and is a two-time Mountain West Coach of the Year.

== Career ==
Hanson played for the El Toro High School Chargers, where she was a Soccer America Top 25 recruit, a Parade All-American, and NSCAA All-Region selection. She played club soccer for Mission Viejo Soccer Club Mirage, with the team winning the state championship seven times. Attending the University of Portland, Hanson played for the Portland Pilots from 1999 to 2002, winning the 2002 NCAA championship in her senior year as team captain. She was a finalist for the Hermann Trophy in 2002, and was named to the Soccer America National MVP team in 2000 and 2002. She was an NSCAA All-American as a second team player in 2000 and 2001, as well as the first team in 2002, and a Soccer Buzz First-Team All-American from 2000 to 2002. She was also included in the NCAA All-Tournament team in 2000 and the championship-winning 2002 tournament. Hanson was a Soccer Buzz and NSCAA First-Team All-West Region selection, as well as All-WCC selection, from 2000 to 2002, and was chosen as the WCC Defensive Player of the Year in 2000 and 2002. In total, she scored 7 goals and recorded 6 assists in 81 appearances for the Pilots.

Hanson began with the U.S. under-16, under-18, and under-21 national teams, winning the 1999 Nordic Cup with the latter. She made her only international appearance for the United States on January 14, 2001 in a friendly match against China PR. She started the match before being substituted out in the 28th minute, with the match finishing as a 1–1 draw.

Hanson was chosen by the New York Power in the 2003 WUSA Draft. She recorded one assist in eighteen appearances for the Power during the 2003 season.

She later began coaching, working as an assistant for her alma mater Portland Pilots in 2004, before becoming an associate head coach of the Oregon Ducks in 2009. She has also served as a coach for the FC Portland Academy girls' team. In 2013, she was the head coach of the Marist Catholic High School girls' soccer team. Since 2014, she has been the head coach of the San Jose State Spartans women's soccer team, where she was named Mountain West Conference Coach of the Year in 2015 and 2017. Hanson was inducted into the University of Portland Athletics Hall of Fame in 2014 and Oregon Sports Hall of Fame in 2017 as part of the Portland Pilots 2002 championship-winning season. She was also an assistant coach for the 2005 NCAA championship-winning season, which was inducted into the Portland Hall of Fame in 2016. In 2018, she was individually inducted into the Portland Athletics Hall of Fame. Hanson resigned from her position to pursue career opportunities outside of coaching prior to the 2022 season.

== Personal life ==
Hanson was born in Newport Beach, California to Janet and Bob Orlandos, though she grew up in Lake Forest (El Toro). She graduated from the University of Portland in 2003 with a Bachelor of Arts in interdisciplinary studies. She was married to college baseball player Travis Hanson in December 2005, and has two children.

== Career statistics ==
=== International ===
United States
Year	Apps	Goals
2001	1	0
Total	1	0

== Honors ==
Portland Pilots

- NCAA Division I women's soccer tournament: 2002

== Head coaching record ==
Record table
Season	Team	Overall	Conference	Standing	Postseason
San Jose State Spartans (Mountain West Conference) (2014–present)
2014	San Jose State	8–8–3	5–5–1	7th	
2015	San Jose State	10–8–4	8–3	2nd	NCAA Division I First Round
2016	San Jose State	10–6–4	7–3–1	2nd	
2017	San Jose State	12–6–2	9–1–1	1st	
2018	San Jose State	9–7–6	6–2–3	4th	NCAA Division I First Round
2019	San Jose State	7–9–4	5–4–2	T–5th	
2021 (spring)	San Jose State	2–7–1	2–7–1	5th (West)	
2021	San Jose State	7–11–1	4–6–1	10th (West)	
San Jose State:		65–62–25 (.510)	46–31–10 (.586)		
Total:		58–51–24 (.526)			
National champion Postseason invitational champion Conference regular season champion Conference regular season and conference tournament champion Division regular season champion Division regular season and conference tournament champion Conference tournament champion
