= 2019 LA Galaxy OC season =

LA Galaxy OC
- Manager: Scott Juniper
- Stadium: Championship Soccer Stadium
- 2nd Place-West Conference

The 2019 LA Galaxy OC season is the club's second season, and second season in United Women's Soccer. LA Galaxy OC play their home matches at Championship Soccer Stadium in the Orange County Great park in Irvine, California. The team finished 2nd in league play and won the UWS National title defeating Calgary Foothills WFC 1–0 in the final on July 21, 2019, at Mount Royal University in Calgary, Alberta, Canada.

== Competitions ==
Date	Result	Opponent	Location
19/5/2019	W 4-0	Santa Clarita Blue Heat	Orange County Great Park
2/6/2019	W 2-1	Colorado Pride	Orange County Great Park
8/6/2019	W 4-0	Colorado Price	Mountain Lion Stadium
14/6/2019	W 1-0	Queen City United SC	University of Regina
16/6/2019	L 0–1	Calgary Foothills	Mount Royal University
23/6/2019	W 3-0	Queen City United SC	Orange County Great Park
30/6/2019	D 1-1	Calgary Foothills WFC	Orange County Great Park
6/7/2019	D 1-1	Santa Clarita Blue Heat	Master's University
National Playoffs
13/7/2019	W 4-1	Houston Aces	
20/7/2019	W 5-1	Indiana Union	Mount Royal University
21/7/2019	W 1-0	Calgary Foothills	Mount Royal University

== Player Stats ==
#	Name	GP	Min	G	A	Pts	FC	YC	RC
8	Sonest Furtado	7	278	2	1	5	0	0	0
10	Jordan Marada	7	466	2	1	5	0	0	0
12	Nicole Molen	7	618	0	0	0	0	1	0
11	Genessee Daughetee	7	620	0	0	0	0	0	0
9	Millene Cabral Vieira	7	519	5	0	10	0	0	0
19	Chelsey Patterson	6	522	0	0	0	0	0	0
6	Morgan Batcheller	5	346	0	0	0	0	0	0
7	Lindsey Huie	5	345	1	2	4	0	0	0
28	Natalie Ward	4	158	0	0	0	0	0	0
4	Natalie Jacobs	4	360	2	0	4	0	0	0
16	Natsuna Sugishita	4	185	0	1	1	0	0	0
22	Arlie Jones	4	210	0	0	0	0	0	0
15	Jordan O'Brien	3	109	0	0	0	0	0	0
14	Olivia Athens	3	197	0	0	0	0	0	0
11	Abi Kim	3	178	0	1	1	0	0	0
2	Carolyn Greco	3	27	0	0	0	0	0	0
20	Jayma Martin	3	110	1	0	2	0	0	0
00	Hillary Beall	2	180	0	0	0	0	0	0
26	Rebecca Wilson	2	116	1	1	3	0	0	0
23	Madeline Vergura	2	52	0	0	0	0	0	0
18	Mikhaila Bowden	2	35	0	0	0	0	0	0
	Madison Louderback	2	49	0	1	1	0	0	0
23	Kate Wiesner	2	166	1	1	3	0	0	0
	Lilli Rask	2	48	0	0	0	0	0	0
	Brianna Westrup	2	180	0	0	0	0	0	0
	Taylor Kornieck	2	82	0	0	0	0	0	0
	Anjelyka Brown	1	16	0	0	0	0	0	0
28	Jenna Nighswonger	1	24	0	0	0	0	0	0
	Kiri Dale	1	0	0	0	0	0	0	0
3	Janelly Farias	1	54	0	0	0	0	0	0
	Atlanta Primus	1	23	0	0	0	0	0	0
	Luisa Delgado	1	90	0	0	0	0	0	0
	Francesca Tagliaferri	1	0	0	0	0	0	0	0
	Natasha Kai	1	90	0	0	0	0	0	0

== Goaltending statistics ==
#	Name	GP	Min	GA	SV
00	Hillary Beall	7	630	3	15
