= Jerry Yeagley Award =

Award given to a former college soccer player

- Awarded for: An individual who has demonstrated exceptional personal achievements either on or off the soccer field.
- Country: United States
- Presented by: United Soccer Coaches

History
- First award: 2005
- Most recent: Kristin Acquavella, United States Navy
- Website: site

The Jerry Yeagley Award (Jerry Yeagley Award for Exceptional Personal Service Award) is an award given to a former college soccer player, either women's or men's, that has demonstrated exceptional personal achievements either on or off the soccer field.

The award was first awarded in 2005 to Don Rawson, who was then the Indiana Soccer Association president, and a former player for the Indiana Hoosiers men's soccer program in the late 1960s and early 1970s.

The award is named for Jerry Yeagley, who formerly coached the Indiana Hoosiers soccer program.

== Past winners ==
- 2025 – Amir Lowery, Executive Director and co-founder of the Open Goal Project
- 2024 – Christine Roehling, Founder The Beat Goes on Foundation
- 2023 – Rob Stone studio host and sportscaster
- 2022 – Kristin Acquavella, Director, Logistics, Fleet Supply and Ordnance, United States Navy
- 2020 – Raymon Gaddis, Philadelphia Union coaching staff
- 2019 – Ann Murphy, Kansas City, Mo. Police Department/Youth RISE KC/Saint Louis University
- 2018 – William Smith, Monrovia Football Academy/LEAD Africa/William & Mary
- 2017 – Nicole Aunapu Mann, NASA/U.S. Naval Academy
- 2016 – Angela Hucles, United States Women's National Team/Empowerment Through Sport
- 2015 – Mark Spiegel, Make Your Own Ball Day
- 2014 – Ben Gucciardi, Soccer Without Borders
- 2013 – Lorrie Fair, United States Women's National Team
- 2012 – Heather Walls, Centre College (Ky.)
- 2011 – Mary McVeigh, Dartmouth College
- 2010 – Diego Gutierrez, Philadelphia Union
- 2009 – Lauren Gregg, United States Women's National Team
- 2008 – Curtis Pride, Gallaudet University
- 2007 – Hugo Salcedo, U.S. Soccer
- 2006 – Derek Arneaud, East Stroudsburg University
- 2005 – Don Rawson, Indiana Soccer Association

== See also ==
- List of sports awards honoring women
