= Utah Utes women's soccer =

American college soccer team

- Founded: 1995; 31 years ago
- University: University of Utah
- Head coach: Hideki Nakada (6th season)
- Conference: Big 12
- Location: Salt Lake City, Utah, US
- Stadium: Ute Field (capacity: 2,000)
- Nickname: Utes
- Colors: Red and white
Home	Away

NCAA tournament Round of 16
- 2016

NCAA tournament Round of 32
- 2002, 2006, 2016

NCAA tournament appearances
- 2002, 2003, 2004, 2005, 2006, 2013, 2016, 2019

Conference tournament championships
- Mountain West Conference; 2003, 2004

Conference regular season championships
- Mountain West Conference; 1999, 2003, 2005, 2006

The Utah Utes women's soccer represents the University of Utah in the Big 12 Conference of NCAA Division I college soccer. The team is coached by Hideki Nakada, Jackie Poortinga, Sam Gomez, and Emma Greenwood. The team plays its home games at Ute Field.

== History ==
Utah women's soccer began as an NCAA-affiliated program in the 1995–96 school year when the Western Athletic Conference began to sponsor women's soccer. The program earned its first NCAA tournament bid in 2002.

== Results by season ==
Season Results
Year	Coach	Overall record	Conference record	Conference standing	Postseason
(Western Athletic Conference) (1995–1998)
1995	Amy Winslow	7–8–2	–	–	–
1996	Amy Winslow	12–6–1	1–3–1	4th	–
1997	Amy Winslow	9–11–1	3–2–0	2nd	–
1998	Amy Winslow	12–7–0	2–4–0	5th	–
(Mountain West Conference) (1999–2010)
1999	Amy Winslow	13–7–0	5–1–0	T-1st	–
2000	Amy Winslow	13–7–1	4–2–0	2nd	–
2001	Amy Winslow	11–7–0	3–3–0	4th	–
2002	Rich Manning	13–4–3	4–1–1	2nd	NCAA Round of 32
2003	Rich Manning	16–2–2	6–0–0	1st	NCAA 1st Round
2004	Rich Manning	13–6–3	3–2–1	4th	NCAA 1st Round
2005	Rich Manning	14–7–1	6–0–1	1st	NCAA 1st Round
2006	Rich Manning	16–5–1	7–0–0	1st	NCAA Round of 32
2007	Rich Manning	12–5–4	3–2–2	5th	–
2008	Rich Manning	11–9–2	5–2–0	2nd	–
2009	Rich Manning	10–10–2	4–2–1	3rd	–
2010	Rich Manning	5–15–1	3–3–1	4th	–
(Pac-12 Conference) (2011–2023)
2011	Rich Manning	10–9–1	6–5–0	5th	–
2012	Rich Manning	8–8–3	3–7–1	9th	–
2013	Rich Manning	10–5–6	6–3–2	3rd	NCAA 1st Round
2014	Rich Manning	8–8–4	1–8–2	11th	–
2015	Rich Manning	7–10–3	4–7–0	9th	–
2016	Rich Manning	13–4–5	6–1–4	4th	NCAA Round of 16
2017	Rich Manning	5–11–3	0–9–2	12th	–
2018	Rich Manning	9–8–2	6–4–1	4th	–
2019	Rich Manning	8–9–4	3–5–3	8th	NCAA 1st Round
2020	Rich Manning	4–9–3	3–6–2	10th	–
2021	Hideki Nakada	6–10–4	1–7–3	11th	–
2022	Hideki Nakada	6–7–6	2–5–4	8th	–
2023	Hideki Nakada	6–8–6	2–6–3	10th	–
(Big 12 Conference) (2024–present)
2024	Hideki Nakada	8–6–5	5–3–3	9th	–
2025	Hideki Nakada	7–10–3	2–7–2	13th	–
Totals: 31 Years – 3 Coaches		302-238-82 (.551)		4 Conference championships	8 Postseason appearances

== Current roster ==
As of August 2026

Note: Flags indicate national team as defined under FIFA eligibility rules; some limited exceptions apply. Players may hold more than one non-FIFA nationality.

No.	Pos.	Nation	Player
0	GK	USA	Hailey Cobb
1	GK	USA	Anna Solomon
2	DF	USA	Callie Blaylock
3	MF	USA	Nevaeh Peregrina
4	FW	USA	Reese Clem
5	FW	USA	Mia Avery
6	FW	USA	Julia Oka
7	DF	USA	Reese Kennel
8	MF	USA	Maddie Stoddard
9	FW	USA	Sophie Bellini
10	MF/DF	USA	Kennedy Fletcher
11	MF	USA	Shannon Davidson
12	FW	USA	Abby Affleck
13	MF	USA	Eliza Smith

No.	Pos.	Nation	Player
14	DF	USA	Kori Pickelle
15	DF	USA	Brooke Gardner
16	MF	USA	Rylan Park
17	MF	USA	Ava Martinez
18	DF	USA	Cara Yang
19	DF	USA	Kaella Chin
20	DF	USA	Tatym Dever
21	FW	USA	Jastel David
22	DF	USA	Bre'Elle Dean
23	MF	USA	Katie Callaway
24	FW	USA	Ava Escobedo
26	FW	CIV	Emmanuella Yapi
28	MF	USA	Addison Lockerby
29	GK	MKD	Berna Kabakci

== Awards ==
Player	Award	Season
Amy Winslow	MWC Coach of the Year	1997
Amy Winslow	MWC Coach of the Year	1999
Rich Manning	MWC Coach of the Year	2002
Amber Brower	MWC Offensive Player of the Year	2003
Amanda Feigt	MWC Freshman of the Year	2003
Amanda Feigt	MWC Offensive Player of the Year	2005
Adele Letro	MWC Freshman of the Year	2005

Player	Award	Season
Rich Manning	MWC Coach of the Year	2005
Melissa Wayman	MWC Defensive Player of the Year	2005
Kelly Isleib (co-winner)	MWC Freshman of the Year	2006
Adele Letro	MWC Offensive Player of the Year	2006
Rich Manning	MWC Coach of the Year	2006
Ashley Mason	MWC Defensive Player of the Year	2006

=== All-WAC Honors ===
Player	First team All-WAC
Jacki Doman	1996
Staci Burt	1997
Staci Burt	1998

Player	Second team All-WAC
Karen Boardman	1996
Staci Burt	1996
Dominique Barcellona	1997
Karen Boardman	1997
Lorrie Tipton	1997
Jessica Narajowski	1998
Lorrie Tipton	1998

=== All-MWC Honors ===
Player	First team All-MWC
Staci Burt	1999
Courtney Hills McBeth	1999
Amy Kofoed	1999
Amy Kofoed	2000
Shauna Gurr-Bingham	2001
Amy Kofoed	2001
Katie Battazzo	2002
Shauna Gurr-Bingham	2002
Maren Harper	2002
Amber Brower	2003
Amanda Feigt	2003
Tracy Stratton Garner	2003
Amanda Feigt	2004
Tracy Stratton Garner	2004
Amanda Feigt	2005
Adele Letro	2005
Melissa Wayman	2005
Amanda Feigt	2006
Adele Letro	2006
Ashley Mason	2006
Melissa Wayman	2006
Kelly Isleib	2007
Adele Letro	2007
Kelly Isleib	2008
Katy Reineke	2008
Erin Dalley	2009
Kelly Isleib	2009
Lauren Porter	2009
Lauren Hair	2010

Player	Second team All-MWC
Jesa Zollinger	1999
Shauna Gurr-Bingham	2000
Courtney Hills-McBeth	2000
Jesa Zollinger	2000
Bobbie Benegas	2001
Amber Brower	2001
Missy Dennis	2002
Megan Maxwell	2002
Jen Williams	2002
Bobbie Benegas	2003
Lauren Field	2003
Ashley Mason	2003
Kiley Jones	2004
Kim Lloyd	2004
Ashley Mason	2005
Kelly Isleib	2006
Kiley Jones	2006
Lauren Hair	2008
Lauren Porter	2008
Lauren Hair	2009
Lauren Porter	2010

=== All-Pac-12 Honors ===
Player	First team All-Pac-12
Hailey Skolmoski	2016

Player	Second team All-Pac-12
Erin Dalley	2012
Jenny Hutton	2013
Lindsey Luke	2013
Katie Taylor	2014
Katie Rogers	2016
Paola van der Veen	2017
Paola van der Veen	2018

Player	Third team All-Pac-12
Hailey Skolmoski	2018

=== All-Big 12 Honors ===
Player	Second team All-Big 12
Kelly Bullock	2024
Taliana Kaufusi	2024

=== All-Pac-12 Freshman Honors ===
All-Pac-12 Freshman Honors

Player	Pac-12 All-Freshman Team
Avery Jenkins	2011
Lindsey Luke	2012
Katie Rogers	2013
Mariah Elmer	2014
Paola van der Veen	2015
Tavia Leachman	2016
Hailey Stodden	2018
Taliana Kaufusi	2020
Kennedy Schoennauer	2023

=== All-Big 12 All-Newcomer/Freshman Honors ===
Note

- ‡ indicates player was Big 12 Newcomer of the Year
- † indicates player was Big 12 Freshman of the Year

All-Big 12 All-Newcomer/Freshman Honors

Player	Big 12 All-Newcomer/Freshman Team
Bella Woods	2024

== Individual Records ==
Career Goals
Player	Years	Goals
Amy Kofoed	1998–2001	46
Staci Burt	1996–99	38
Adele Letro	2005–07	36
Shauna Gurr-Bingham	1999–2002	30
Taliana Kaufusi	2020–24	27

Season Goals
Player	Year	Goals
Jackie Doman	1996	20
Adele Letro	2007	17
Amy Kofoed	2000	16
Hailey Skolmoski	2016	13
Amy Kofoed	1999	13
Staci Burt	1998	13

Career Assists
Player	Years	Assists
Kelly Isleib	2006–09	28
Amanda Feigt	2003–06	22
Shauna Gurr-Bingham	1999–02	21
Staci Burt	1996–99	21
Katie Taylor	2011–14	16
Amy Kofoed	1998–2001	16

Season Assists
Player	Year	Assists
Kelly Isleib	2007	13
Shuana Gurr-Bingham	2000	12
Lorrie Tipton	1998	9
Jackie Doman	1996	9

Career Points
Player	Years	Points
Amy Kofoed	1998–2001	108
Staci Burt	1996–99	97
Adele Letro	2005–07	86
Shauna Gurr-Bingham	1999–2002	81
Amanda Feigt	2003–06	72

Season Points
Player	Year	Points
Jackie Doman	1996	49
Adele Letro	2007	39
Amy Kofoed	2000	36
Staci Burt	1998	32
Amy Kofoed	2001	30
Katie Tate	2000	30

Career Saves
Player	Years	Saves
Tawni Martineau	1995–98	373
Lindsey Luke	2012–15	367
Courtney Hills-McBeth	1999–2002	298
Ashley Mason	2003–06	295
Carly Nelson	2016–19	273

Season Saves
Player	Year	Saves
Tawni Martineau	1995	115
Courtney Hills-McBeth	1999	114
Courtney Hills-McBeth	2000	112
Carly Nelson	2019	105
Lindsey Luke	2014	99
