= 2003 NCAA Division I women's soccer tournament =

2003 NCAA women's soccer tournament
Women's College Cup (semifinals & final)

Tournament details
- Country: United States
- Dates: November 13 – December 7, 2003
- Teams: 64

Final positions
- Champions: North Carolina Tar Heels (17th title, 21st College Cup)
- Runners-up: Connecticut Huskies (4th title match, 7th College Cup)
- Semifinalists: Florida State Seminoles (1st College Cup); UCLA Bruins (2nd College Cup)

Tournament statistics
- Matches played: 63
- Goals scored: 182 (2.89 per match)
- Attendance: 57,243 (909 per match)
- Top goal scorer(s): Heather O'Reilly, UNC (8G, 2A)

Awards
- Best player: Heather O'Reilly, UNC (Offensive); Catherine Reddick, UNC (Defensive)

The 2003 NCAA Division I women's soccer tournament (also known as the 2003 Women's College Cup) was the 22nd annual single-elimination tournament to determine the national champion of NCAA Division I women's collegiate soccer. The semifinals and championship game were played at SAS Soccer Park in Cary, North Carolina from December 5–7, 2003.

Top seeded North Carolina defeated unranked Connecticut in the final, 6–0, to win their seventeenth national title. The undefeated Tar Heels (27–0) were coached by Anson Dorrance. The Tar Heels dominated their competition on their way to the championship, winning all six of their games by a combined score of 32–0.

The most outstanding offensive player was Heather O'Reilly from North Carolina, and the most outstanding defensive player was Catherine Reddick, also from North Carolina. O'Reilly and Reddick, along with nine other players, were named to the All-Tournament team. O'Reilly was also the tournament's leading scorer, with 8 goals. The championship referee was Brian Kirkley from Atlanta, GA.

== Qualification ==
All Division I women's soccer programs were eligible to qualify for the tournament. The tournament field remained fixed at 64 teams.

== Format ==
Just as before, the final two rounds, deemed the Women's College Cup, were played at a pre-determined neutral site. All other rounds were played on campus sites at the home field of the higher-seeded team. The only exceptions were the first two rounds, which were played at regional campus sites. The top sixteen teams, all of which were seeded for the first time ever, hosted four team-regionals on their home fields during the tournament's first weekend.

=== Records ===
North Carolina Regional
Seed	School	Conference	Berth Type	Record
	Arizona State	Pac-10	At-large	12–4–3
	Cal Poly	Big West	Automatic	18–1–2
	Denver	Sun Belt	Automatic	18–3
	DePaul	Conference USA	Automatic	14–6–2
	High Point	Big South	Automatic	10–9–1
16	Illinois	Big Ten	Automatic	16–3–2
	Nebraska	Big 12	At-large	12–7–1
1	North Carolina	ACC	Automatic	21–0
8	Portland	West Coast	At-large	16–3–1
	Purdue	Big Ten	At-large	12–5–3
9	Santa Clara	West Coast	Automatic	12–3–5
	Stanford	Pac-10	At-large	10–8–2
	UNC-Greensboro	Southern	Automatic	14–6–2
	Wake Forest	ACC	At-large	10–6–3
	Washington	Pac-10	At-large	11–6–3
	Western Michigan	MAC	Automatic	13–7–1

Florida Regional
Seed	School	Conference	Berth Type	Record
	Auburn	SEC	At-large	13–3–3
	Clemson	ACC	At-large	11–6–2
	Dartmouth	Ivy League	Automatic	09–5–2
	Dayton	Atlantic 10	Automatic	14–5–2
3	Florida	SEC	At-large	16–3–2
11	Florida State	ACC	At-large	13–7–1
	Georgia	SEC	At-large	12–9
	Loyola (MD)	MAAC	Automatic	12–8–1
	Mississippi	SEC	At-large	14–5–2
	Ohio State	Big Ten	At-large	12–4–3
	Oklahoma	Big 12	At-large	08–6–5
	Oklahoma State	Big 12	Automatic	15–4–3
14	Tennessee	SEC	Automatic	15–4–2
	Texas	Big 12	At-large	12–8
	UCF	Atlantic Sun	Automatic	16–4–1
6	West Virginia	Big East	At-large	15–3–2

UCLA Regional
Seed	School	Conference	Berth Type	Record
12	Duke	ACC	At-large	13–6–1
	Eastern Illinois	Ohio Valley	Automatic	11–5–5
	Illinois State	Missouri Valley	Automatic	11–5–3
13	Kansas	Big 12	At-large	16–5–1
	Maryland	ACC	At-large	11–8–1
	Missouri	Big 12	At-large	11–10–1
	Navy	Patriot	Automatic	17–4–1
5	Penn State	Big Ten	At-large	16–3–2
	Pepperdine	West Coast	At-large	13–5–1
	Rutgers	Big East	At-large	10–6–4
	San Diego	West Coast	At-large	09–7–4
	SMU	WAC	Automatic	17–3–1
	Stephen F. Austin	Southland	Automatic	15–4–2
	Texas A&M	Big 12	At-large	12–5–2
4	UCLA	Pac-10	Automatic	16–1–3
	USC	Pac-10	At-large	09–7–4

Notre Dame Regional
Seed	School	Conference	Berth Type	Record
15	Boston College	Big East	At-large	15–2–3
	Boston U.	America East	Automatic	12–5–5
	BYU	Mountain West	At-large	14–6–2
	Central Conn. State	Northeast	Automatic	15–2–3
10	Colorado	Big 12	At-large	15–3–1
	Connecticut	Big East	At-large	10–5–3
	Idaho State	Big Sky	Automatic	10–8–1
	Loyola (IL)	Horizon	Automatic	10–10
	Michigan	Big Ten	At-large	09–7–6
2	Notre Dame	Big East	At-large	19–2–1
	Oakland	Mid-Continent	Automatic	15–4–1
	Princeton	Ivy League	At-large	11–2–3
	Utah	Mountain West	Automatic	16–2–1
	Villanova	Big East	Automatic	14–5–3
7	Virginia	ACC	At-large	12–5–2
	William & Mary	CAA	Automatic	14–6–2

== Bracket ==
=== North Carolina Bracket ===
First round November 13–14; Regional Campus Sites
1	North Carolina	8
High Point	0
Chapel Hill, NC
UNC Greensboro	2
Wake Forest	1
Purdue	2
DePaul	1
Champaign, IL
16	Illinois	0
Western Michigan	2
9	Santa Clara	1
Stanford	0
Santa Clara, CA
Arizona State	3
Cal Poly	1
Washington	1
Nebraska	2
Portland, OR
8	Portland	1
Denver	0

Second round November 15–16; Regional Campus Sites
1	North Carolina	5
UNC Greensboro	0
Purdue	3
Western Michigan	2
9	Santa Clara	1
Arizona State	0
Nebraska	1
8	Portland	4

Third Round; November 21–23; Campus Sites
1	North Carolina*	7
Purdue	0
9	Santa Clara	0(4)
8	Portland*	0(2)

Quarterfinals; November 28–29; Campus Sites
1	North Carolina*	3
9	Santa Clara	0

=== UCLA Bracket ===
First round November 13–14; Regional Campus Sites
5	Penn State	5
Navy	1
State College, PA
Rutgers	1(4)
Maryland	1(3)
Texas A&M	1(4)
SMU	1(2)
College Station, TX
12	Duke	3
Stephen F. Austin	0
13	Kansas	3
Illinois State	1
Columbia, MO
Missouri	1
Eastern Illinois	0
Pepperdine	1
USC	0
Los Angeles, CA
4	UCLA	2
San Diego	0

Second round November 15–16; Regional Campus Sites
5	Penn State	3
Rutgers	1
Texas A&M	2
12	Duke	1
13	Kansas	2
Missouri	0
Pepperdine	0
4	UCLA	2

Third Round; November 21–23; Campus Sites
5	Penn State*	3
Texas A&M	0
13	Kansas	0
4	UCLA*	1

Quarterfinals; November 28–29; Campus Sites
5	Penn State	0
4	UCLA*	4

=== Florida Bracket ===
First round November 13–14; Regional Campus Sites
3	Florida (2OT)	3
Central Florida	2
Gainesville, FL
Ole Miss	1
Texas	0
Georgia	2
Clemson	1
Knoxville, TN
14	Tennessee	1
Oklahoma	0
11	Florida State	5
Dartmouth	0
Tallahassee, FL
Oklahoma State	0
Auburn	1
Ohio State	3
Dayton	0
Morgantown, WV
6	West Virginia	4
Loyola–Maryland	2

Second round November 15–16; Regional Campus Sites
3	Florida (2OT)	3
Ole Miss	2
Georgia	0
14	Tennessee	1
11	Florida State (2OT)	2
Auburn	1
Ohio State	0
6	West Virginia	3

Third Round; November 21–23; Campus Sites
3	Florida*	1
14	Tennessee	0
11	Florida State (OT)	3
6	West Virginia*	2

Quarterfinals; November 28–29; Campus Sites
3	Florida*	1
11	Florida State	2

=== Notre Dame Bracket ===
First round November 13–14; Regional Campus Sites
7	Virginia	1(4)
William & Mary	1(2)
Charlottesville, VA
Villanova	2
Princeton	1
Utah	0(4)
Idaho State	0(5)
Salt Lake City, UT
10	Colorado	0
BYU	2
15	Boston College	0
Central Connecticut	1
Newton, MA
Connecticut	1
Boston University	0
Michigan	1
Oakland	0
South Bend, IN
2	Notre Dame	5
Loyola–Chicago	0

Second round November 15–16; Regional Campus Sites
7	Virginia	0(2)
Villanova	0(4)
Idaho State	0
BYU	2
Central Connecticut	2
Connecticut (3OT)	3
Michigan	1
2	Notre Dame	0

Third Round; November 21–23; Campus Sites
Villanova*	0(3)
BYU	0(5)
Connecticut*	5
Michigan	0

Quarterfinals; November 28–29; Campus Sites
BYU	1
Connecticut*	3

=== College Cup ===
Semifinals; December 5 SAS Soccer Park; Cary, North Carolina
1	North Carolina	3
4	UCLA	0
11	Florida State	0
Connecticut	2

Championship; December 7 SAS Soccer Park; Cary, North Carolina
1	North Carolina	6
Connecticut	0

== All-tournament team ==
- Lori Chalupny, North Carolina
- Jessica Giertsen, Connecticut
- Kristen Graczyk, Connecticut
- Heather O'Reilly, North Carolina (most outstanding offensive player)
- Nandi Price, UCLA
- Alyssa Ramsey, North Carolina
- Catherine Reddick, Portland (most outstanding defensive player)
- Lindsay Tarpley, North Carolina
- Maggie Tomecka, North Carolina
- India Trotter, Florida State
- Carmen Watley, North Carolina

== See also ==
- NCAA Women's Soccer Championships (Division II, Division III)
- NCAA Men's Soccer Championships (Division I, Division II, Division III)
