= 2005 NCAA Division I women's soccer tournament =

2005 NCAA women's soccer tournament
Women's College Cup (semifinals & final)
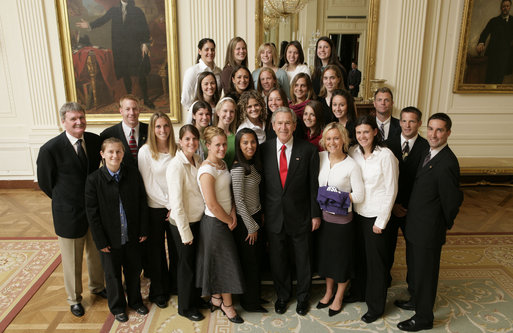
- Champions Portland at the White House

Tournament details
- Country: United States
- Dates: November 10 – December 4, 2005
- Teams: 64

Final positions
- Champions: Portland Pilots (2nd title, 8th College Cup)
- Runners-up: UCLA Bruins (3rd title match, 4th College Cup)
- Semifinalists: Florida State Seminoles (2nd College Cup); Penn State Nittany Lions (3rd College Cup)

Tournament statistics
- Matches played: 63
- Goals scored: 207 (3.29 per match)
- Attendance: 62,569 (993 per match)
- Top goal scorer(s): Kara Lang, UCLA (8G, 1A)

Awards
- Best player: Offensive–Christine Sinclair (Portland); Defensive–Cori Alexander (Portland)

The 2005 NCAA Division I women's soccer tournament (also known as the 2005 Women's College Cup) was the 24th annual single-elimination tournament to determine the national champion of NCAA Division I women's collegiate soccer. The semifinals and championship game were played at Aggie Soccer Complex in College Station, Texas from December 2–4, 2005 while the preceding rounds were played at various sites across the country from November 10–25.

Portland defeated UCLA in the final, 4–0, to win their second national title.

The most outstanding offensive player was Christine Sinclair from Portland, and the most outstanding defensive player was Cori Alexander, also from Portland. Sinclair was also named MOP Offensive after Portland's first title in 2002. Sinclair and Alexander, alongside nine other players, were named to the All-Tournament team.

The tournament's leading scorer, with 8 goals and 1 assist, was Kara Lang from UCLA.

== Qualification ==
All Division I women's soccer programs were eligible to qualify for the tournament. The tournament field remained fixed at 64 teams.

== Format ==
Just as before, the final two rounds, deemed the Women's College Cup, were played at a pre-determined neutral site. All other rounds were played on campus sites at the home field of the higher-seeded team. The only exceptions were the first two rounds, which were played at regional campus sites. The top sixteen teams hosted four team-regionals on their home fields during the tournament's first weekend. Rather than being seeded 1 to 16, teams were seeded to 1 to 4 and placed in one of four main brackets.

=== National seeds ===
#1 Seeds (Overall #1–#4)	#2 Seeds (Overall #5–#8)	#3 Seeds (Overall #9–#12)	#4 Seeds (Overall #13–#16)
North Carolina (20–0–1); Penn State (19–0–1); Portland (18–0–1); UCLA (17–1–2)	Florida State (17–3–0); Notre Dame (19–2–0); Santa Clara (14–4–2); Virginia (15–5–1)	California (14–3–2); Cal State Fullerton (17–3–0); Connecticut (15–4–2); Duke (13–5–1)	BYU (15–2–3); Marquette (17–3–1); Pepperdine (13–3–3); Texas A&M (16–3–2)

=== Records ===
Penn State Regional
Seed	School	Conference	Berth Type	Record
	Boston College	ACC	At-large	11–5–2
	Boston U.	America East	Automatic	13–4–4
	Bucknell	Patriot	Automatic	11–8–1
3	Connecticut	Big East	At-large	15–4–2
	Dartmouth	Ivy League	At-large	12–4–1
	Fresno State	WAC	Automatic	10–9–1
	Hofstra	CAA	Automatic	14–3–3
	North Texas	Sun Belt	Automatic	16–3–2
	Northwestern State	Southland	Automatic	12–5–1
1	Penn State	Big Ten	At-large	19–0–1
	Saint Louis	Atlantic 10	Automatic	15–4
2	Santa Clara	West Coast	At-large	14–4–2
	SMU	Conference USA	At-large	14–4–2
	Stanford	Pac-10	At-large	10–6–3
4	Texas A&M	Big 12	Automatic	16–3–2
	West Virginia	Big East	At-large	11–5–3

UCLA Regional
Seed	School	Conference	Berth Type	Record
3	Cal State Fullerton	Big West	Automatic	17–3
	Colorado	Big 12	At-large	12–7–3
	Gonzaga	West Coast	At-large	12–3–4
	Liberty	Big South	Automatic	12–6–2
4	Marquette	Big East	At-large	17–3–1
	Milwaukee	Horizon	Automatic	12–4–4
	MVSU	SWAC	Automatic	09–7–2
	Purdue	Big Ten	At-large	11–7–1
	Tennessee	SEC	Automatic	14–5–2
	UC Riverside	Big West	At-large	11–4–5
1	UCLA	Pac-10	Automatic	17–1–2
	UNLV	Mountain West	Automatic	13–6–3
	USC	Pac-10	At-large	12–5–2
2	Virginia	ACC	At-large	15–5–1
	Wake Forest	ACC	At-large	09–8–1
	Wisconsin	Big Ten	Automatic	13–8–2

Portland Regional
Seed	School	Conference	Berth Type	Record
	Arizona	Pac-10	At-large	09–7–3
	Bowling Green	MAC	Automatic	14–6–2
4	BYU	Mountain West	At-large	15–2–3
	Central Conn. State	Northeast	Automatic	17–3
	Creighton	Missouri Valley	Automatic	12–5–3
3	Duke	ACC	At-large	13–5–1
	Fairfield	MAAC	Automatic	10–6–3
	Iowa State	Big 12	At-large	11–6–3
	Michigan State	Big Ten	At-large	11–5–5
	Nebraska	Big 12	At-large	13–7–1
2	Notre Dame	Big East	Automatic	19–2
1	Portland	West Coast	Automatic	18–0–1
	Utah	Mountain West	At-large	14–6–1
	Valparaiso	Mid-Continent	Automatic	12–7–1
	Weber State	Big Sky	Automatic	14–4–1
	Yale	Ivy League	Automatic	13–3–1

North Carolina Regional
Seed	School	Conference	Berth Type	Record
3	California	Pac-10	At-large	14–3–2
	Clemson	ACC	At-large	09–8–2
	Florida	SEC	At-large	13–5–1
	Florida Atlantic	Atlantic Sun	Automatic	16–3–1
2	Florida State	ACC	At-large	17–3
	Illinois	Big Ten	At-large	11–6–3
	Mississippi	SEC	At-large	14–4–2
1	North Carolina	ACC	Automatic	20–1
4	Pepperdine	West Coast	At-large	13–3–3
	Rice	Conference USA	Automatic	13–6–1
	Samford	Ohio Valley	Automatic	15–3–3
	Texas	Big 12	At-large	11–8–1
	UTEP	Conference USA	At-large	18–3–1
	Vanderbilt	SEC	At-large	16–3–2
	VCU	CAA	At-large	12–4–5
	Western Carolina	Southern	Automatic	18–5

== Bracket ==
=== Penn State Bracket ===
First round November 10–11; Regional Campus Sites
1	Penn State	6
Bucknell	0
Jeffrey Field • State College, PA
Hofstra	0
West Virginia	3
SMU	3
North Texas	0
Aggie Soccer Complex • College Station, TX
4	Texas A&M	7
Northwestern State	0
3	Connecticut	0
Boston University	1
Morrone Stadium • Storrs, CT
Boston College	2
Dartmouth	1
Saint Louis	2
Stanford	0
Buck Shaw Stadium • Santa Clara, CA
2	Santa Clara	5
Fresno State	0

Second round November 12–13; Regional Campus Sites
1	Penn State	5
West Virginia	2
SMU	2
4	Texas A&M	4
Boston University	0
Boston College	1
Saint Louis	0
2	Santa Clara	4

Third Round; November 18–20; Campus Sites
1	Penn State*	4
4	Texas A&M	1
Boston College	1
2	Santa Clara*	2

Quarterfinals; November 25; Campus Sites
1	Penn State*	2
2	Santa Clara	1

=== Portland Bracket ===
First round November 10–11; Regional Campus Sites
1	Portland	5
Iowa State	0
Nebraska Soccer Field • Lincoln, NE
Creighton	0
Nebraska	1
Utah	0
Arizona	1
Ute Soccer Field • Salt Lake City, UT
4	BYU	1(3)
Weber State (OT, PSO)	1(4)
3	Duke	4
Fairfield	0
Reese Stadium • New Haven, CT
Yale	3
Central Connecticut	0
Michigan State	4
Bowling Green	0
Alumni Field • South Bend, IN
2	Notre Dame	6
Valparaiso	0

Second round November 12–13; Regional Campus Sites
1	Portland	3
Nebraska	2
Arizona	1
Weber State	0
3	Duke	0
Yale	1
Michigan State	0
2	Notre Dame	3

Third Round; November 18–20; Campus Sites
1	Portland*	4
Arizona	0
Yale	2
2	Notre Dame*	5

Quarterfinals; November 25; Campus Sites
1	Portland*	3
2	Notre Dame	1

=== UCLA Bracket ===
First round November 10–11; Regional Campus Sites
1	UCLA	9
Mississippi Valley State	0
Drake Stadium • Los Angeles, CA
UC Riverside	0(3)
Colorado (2OT, PSO)	0(4)
Purdue	0(5)
Wisconsin–Milwaukee (2OT, PSO)	0(6)
Valley Fields • Milwaukee, WI
4	Marquette	1
Wisconsin	0
3	Cal State Fullerton (OT)	1
UNLV	0
Fullerton Stadium • Fullerton, CA
USC	1
Gonzaga	0
Tennessee	5
Wake Forest	2
Klöckner Stadium • Charlottesville, VA
2	Virginia	4
Liberty	0

Second round November 12–13; Regional Campus Sites
1	UCLA	3
Colorado	0
Wisconsin–Milwaukee	0
4	Marquette	1
3	Cal State Fullerton	3
USC	1
Tennessee	0
2	Virginia	3

Third Round; November 18–20; Campus Sites
1	UCLA*	4
4	Marquette	0
3	Cal State Fullerton	1
2	Virginia*	2

Quarterfinals; November 25; Campus Sites
1	UCLA*	5
2	Virginia	0

=== North Carolina Bracket ===
First round November 10–11; Regional Campus Sites
1	North Carolina	2
Western Carolina	0
Fetzer Field • Chapel Hill, NC
VCU	3
Clemson	1
Samford (2OT, PSO)	1(5)
Vanderbilt	1(4)
VU Soccer Complex • Nashville, TN
4	Pepperdine	1
Ole Miss	0
3	California	2
Rice	0
Mike A. Myers Stadium • Austin, TX
Texas	2
UTEP	3
Illinois	1
Florida	0
James G. Pressly Stadium • Gainesville, FL
2	Florida State	3
Florida Atlantic	0

Second round November 12–13; Regional Campus Sites
1	North Carolina	6
VCU	2
Samford	1
4	Pepperdine	2
3	California	2
UTEP	1
Illinois	1
2	Florida State	2

Third Round; November 18–20; Campus Sites
1	North Carolina*	6
4	Pepperdine	0
3	California	1
2	Florida State*	2

Quarterfinals; November 25; Campus Sites
1	North Carolina*	1(4)
2	Florida State*	1(5)

=== College Cup ===
Semifinals; December 2 Aggie Soccer Complex; College Station, Texas
1	Penn State	0(3)
1	Portland	0(4)
1	UCLA	4
2	Florida State	0

Championship; December 4 Aggie Soccer Complex; College Station, Texas
1	Portland	4
1	UCLA	0

== All-tournament team ==
- Cori Alexander, Portland (most outstanding defensive player)
- Danesha Adams, UCLA
- Lindsey Huie, Portland
- Stephanie Lopez, Portland
- (Canada) Erin McLeod, Penn State
- Iris Mora, UCLA
- Jill Oakes, UCLA
- Megan Rapinoe, Portland
- (Canada) Christine Sinclair, Portland (most outstanding offensive player)
- India Trotter, Florida State
- Angie Woznuk, Portland

== See also ==
- NCAA Women's Soccer Championships (Division II, Division III)
- NCAA Men's Soccer Championships (Division I, Division II, Division III)
