= Tennessee Lady Volunteers soccer =

American college soccer team

- Founded: 1996; 30 years ago
- University: University of Tennessee
- Athletic director: Danny White
- Head coach: Joe Kirt (5th season)
- Conference: SEC
- Location: Knoxville, Tennessee, US
- Stadium: Regal Soccer Stadium (capacity: 3,000)
- Nickname: Lady Volunteers
- Colors: Orange and white
Home	Away

NCAA tournament Quarterfinals
- 2018

NCAA tournament Round of 16
- 2002, 2003, 2004, 2006, 2007, 2018, 2021

NCAA tournament Round of 32
- 2002, 2003, 2004, 2005, 2006, 2007, 2017, 2018, 2021, 2023

NCAA tournament appearances
- 2001, 2002, 2003, 2004, 2005, 2006, 2007, 2008, 2011, 2012, 2017, 2018, 2021, 2022, 2023, 2024

Conference tournament championships
- 2002, 2003, 2005, 2008, 2021

Conference regular season championships
- 2003, 2004, 2005

The Tennessee Lady Volunteers soccer is the team that represents the University of Tennessee (UT) located in Knoxville, Tennessee in NCAA Division I women's soccer competition as a member of the Southeastern Conference (SEC).

Along with all other UT women's sports teams, it used the nickname "Lady Volunteers" (or the short form "Lady Vols") until the 2015–16 school year, when the school dropped the "Lady" prefix from the nicknames of all women's teams except in basketball. In 2017 the university announced the return of the “Lady Volunteer” name.

== Overview ==
The University of Tennessee began sponsoring women's soccer in 1996 with Charlie MacCabe as head coach. Coach MacCabe was replaced by former North Carolina Tar Heel All-American Angela Kelly in 2000. Coach Kelly had taken the Lady Vols to four SEC Tournament championships and to the NCAA Tournament eight times. Following the 2011 season coach Kelly would leave the program to take over the head coaching job at Texas. Shortly after her departure Brian Pensky was named the third head coach for the Lady Vols soccer team. After winning the SEC conference tournament title in 2021, Pensky left in April 2022 to take the head coach position at Florida State University. Lady Vols Associate Head Coach Joe Kirt was hired to be the fourth head coach on Rocky Top in May 2022. In Kirt's first season as head coach, he led the Lady Vols to their 3rd consecutive SEC East Championship, earning the team a #6 seed in the NCAA Tournament. Tennessee was upset at home in the first round by Xavier 4–1 to end the year 11–6–2. In both his second and third season he led Tennessee to 9–7–4 records, and back to back NCAA Tournament appearances. Advancing to the second round in 2023, and falling in the first round in 2024.

== Regal Soccer Stadium ==
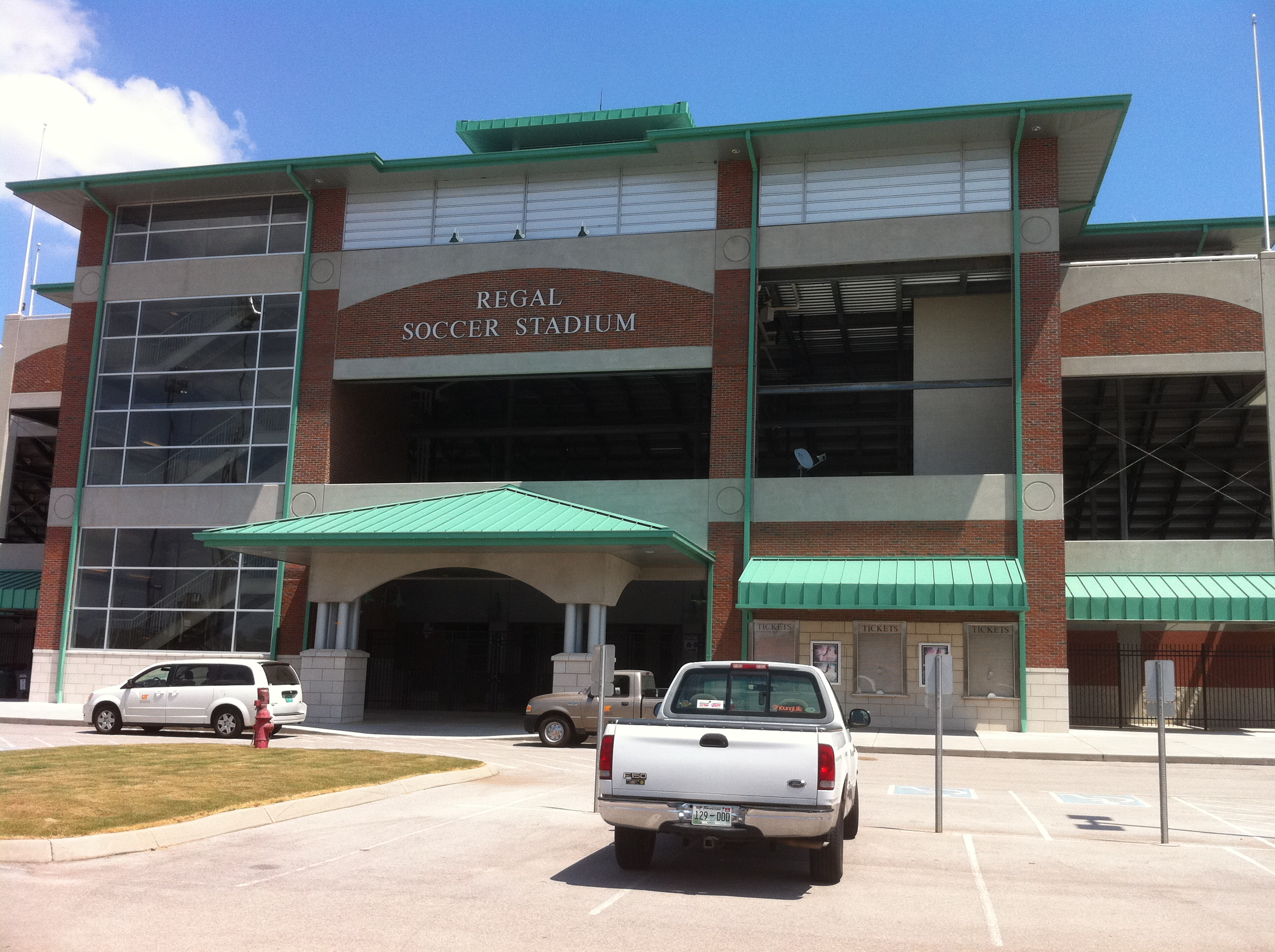
Regal Stadium, home of Tennessee soccer

Dedicated in 2007, Regal Soccer Stadium was built around the old Tennessee Soccer Complex. The new stadium seats 3,000 people and is named after Regal Entertainment Group, the main financial backer for its construction.

== Current squad ==
As of November 2026

Note: Flags indicate national team as defined under FIFA eligibility rules; some limited exceptions apply. Players may hold more than one non-FIFA nationality.

No.	Pos.	Nation	Player
0	GK	USA	Ella Wiederaenders
1	GK	USA	Cayden Norris
2	FW	USA	Shae O'Rourke
3	FW	USA	Jayla Blue
4	MF	USA	Bella Smith
6	MF	USA	Mimi Flanagan
7	DF	USA	Devin Davis
8	MF	USA	Olivia Feagin
9	MF	USA	Kai Tsakiris
10	FW	USA	Taylor Cheatham
11	FW	USA	Kameran Bluette
12	MF	USA	Emerson Moore
13	DF	USA	Marlee Raymond

No.	Pos.	Nation	Player
14	DF	USA	Milee Zych
18	MF	USA	Ines Derrien
19	MF	USA	Tesia Mikuta
20	FW	USA	Claire DeCook
21	FW	USA	Ayva Jordan
22	FW	USA	Kylee Simmons
23	MF	USA	Dakota Brown
24	DF	USA	Savannah Jackson
27	FW	USA	Sophia Prime
29	GK	USA	Lauryn Berry
31	DF	USA	Cora Fry
33	DF	USA	Nyla Blue
35	GK	USA	Morgan Weaver

== Yearly record ==
Season	Coach	Overall	Conference	Standing	Postseason
Charlie MacCabe (Southeastern Conference) (1996–1999)
1996	Charlie MacCabe	6–13–1	3–5	5th (East)	–
1997	Charlie MacCabe	11–8	2–6	5th (East)	–
1998	Charlie MacCabe	12–8	5–3	4th (East)	–
1999	Charlie MacCabe	8–11–1	5–4	6th (East)	–
Charlie MacCabe:		37–40–2	15–18		
Angela Kelly (Southeastern Conference) (2000–2011)
2000	Angela Kelly	12–8	7–2	2nd (East)	–
2001	Angela Kelly	11–6–1	7–2	T-2nd East	NCAA First Round
2002	Angela Kelly	18–6–1	6–2–1	1st (East)	NCAA Round of 16
2003	Angela Kelly	17–5–2	7–1–1	1st (East)	NCAA Round of 16
2004	Angela Kelly	17–5–2	10–1	1st (East)	NCAA Round of 16
2005	Angela Kelly	15–6–2	10–1	1st (East)	NCAA Second Round
2006	Angela Kelly	12–7–4	6–3–2	T-2nd (East)	NCAA Round of 16
2007	Angela Kelly	15–5–2	8–2–1	3rd (East)	NCAA Round of 16
2008	Angela Kelly	10–11–2	5–5–1	4th (East)	NCAA First Round
2009	Angela Kelly	8–9–3	4–5–2	5th (East)	–
2010	Angela Kelly	10–9–1	7–3–1	3rd (East)	–
2011	Angela Kelly	15–7	7–4	2nd (East)	NCAA First Round
Angela Kelly:		160–84–20	84–31–15		
Brian Pensky (Southeastern Conference) (2012–2021)
2012	Brian Pensky	14–5–3	9–3–1	2nd (East)	NCAA First Round
2013	Brian Pensky	8–7–4	3–5–3	T-10th	–
2014	Brian Pensky	10–10–2	4–6–1	10th	–
2015	Brian Pensky	7–5–6	3–5–3	T-9th	–
2016	Brian Pensky	11–9–1	5–5–1	T-6th	–
2017	Brian Pensky	15–4–2	6–3–1	T-6th	NCAA Second Round
2018	Brian Pensky	16–3–3	7–2–1	2nd	NCAA Quarterfinals
2019	Brian Pensky	9–6–3	3–5–2	3rd (East)	–
2020	Brian Pensky	8–6–1	4–3–1	1st (East)	–
2021	Brian Pensky	20–3	8–2	1st (East)	NCAA Round of 16
Brian Pensky:		118–58–25	52–39–14		
Joe Kirt (Southeastern Conference) (2022–present)
2022	Joe Kirt	11–6–2	7–2–1	T-1st (East)	NCAA First Round
2023	Joe Kirt	9–7–4	3–4–3	T-8th	NCAA Second Round
2024	Joe Kirt	9–7–4	3–4–3	9th	NCAA First Round
2025	Joe Kirt	2–0–0	0–0–0		
Joe Kirt:		31–20–10	13–10–7		
Total:		345–202–57			
National champion Postseason invitational champion Conference regular season champion Conference regular season and conference tournament champion Division regular season champion Division regular season and conference tournament champion Conference tournament champion

== NCAA Tournament Results ==
Year	Seed	Round	Opponent	Results
2001		First Round	Duke	T 1–1 (L PK)
2002		First Round	Furman	W 5–0
2002		Second Round	Cincinnati	W 2–1
2002		Round of 16	#2 North Carolina	L 1–3
2003	#14	First Round	Oklahoma	W 1–0
2003	#14	Second Round	Georgia	W 1–0
2003	#14	Round of 16	#3 Florida	L 0–1
2004	#11	First Round	Furman	W 2–0
2004	#11	Second Round	UAB	W 1–0
2004	#11	Round of 16	#6 Ohio State	L 0–1
2005		First Round	Wake Forest	W 5–2
2005		Second Round	#2 Virginia	L 0–3
2006	#4	First Round	UAB	W 4–0
2006	#4	Second Round	Duke	T 0–0 (W PK)
2006	#4	Round of 16	#1 North Carolina	L 2–6
2007	#3	First Round	Furman	W 2–0
2007	#3	Second Round	Clemson	W 1–0
2007	#3	Round of 16	#2 Portland	L 0–3
2008		First Round	Charlotte	L 0–2
2011	#4	First Round	Ohio State	L 0–3
2012		First Round	Miami (OH)	L 3–2
2017		First Round	Murray State	W 2–0
2017		Second Round	Washington State	T 2–2 (L PK)
2018	#2	First Round	Louisville	W 2–1
2018	#2	Second Round	Arizona	W 3–2
2018	#2	Round of 16	#3 Texas A&M	W 3–0
2018	#2	Quarterfinals	#1 Stanford	L 0–2
2021	#3	First Round	Lipscomb	W 3–0
2021	#3	Second Round	Washington State	W 2–0
2021	#3	Round of 16	#2 Michigan	L 0–3
2022	#6	First Round	Xavier	L 1–4
2023		First Round	#4 Xavier	W 1–0
2023		Second Round	#5 Nebraska	L 1–2
2024		First Round	#7 Virginia Tech	L 1–2

== Individual honors ==
=== All Americans ===
- Ali Christoph – 2005, 2006
- Keely Dowling – 2002, 2003, 2004
- Jaimel Johnson – 2007
- Kylee Rossi – 2007
- Hannah Wilkinson – 2012
- Jaida Thomas – 2021
- Wrenne French – 2021
