= SoCal Reds FC =

Soccer team

- Founded: 2019
- Stadium: Championship Soccer Stadium
- League: USL W League

SoCal Reds FC, formerly known as LA Galaxy OC, is an American soccer club based in Irvine, California that plays in the USL W League. While a member of United Women's Soccer and Women's Premier Soccer League, the club played its home games at the Championship Soccer Stadium in the Orange County Great Park.

== History ==
LA Galaxy OC joined United Women's Soccer ahead of the 2018 season, finishing 2nd overall in the UWS West. The following season they won the UWS National Championship 1–0 over Calgary Foothills WFC. The club announced they would be joining the Women's Premier Soccer League for the 2020 season with a new name and logo. However, the rebranded SoCal Reds FC would not be able to play under their new brand as the 2020 WPSL season was canceled due to the COVID-19 pandemic. The club would ultimately remain on hiatus until 2023, finally joining the WPSL. The club did not return to WPSL play the following year.

The club was announced as joining USL W League for the 2026 season, taking the place of previously announced OC Sporting FC.

== Year-by-Year ==
Year	League	Record	Regular season	Qualification	Playoffs		
2018	UWS-West	7–2–1	2nd	Did not qualify			
2019	UWS-West	6–1–2	2nd, West	Wildcard	Quarterfinal 4–1 (Houson Aces)	Semifinal 5–1 (Indiana Union)	National Champions 1–0 (Calgary Foothills WFC)
2020–2025	Did not play						
2026	USL W League	0–1–9	6th, SoCal	Did not qualify			

== Most Recent Team ==
As of August 5, 2019

No	Position	Player	Nation	Previous
11	Fwd	Abigail Kim	United States	Cal
	Fwd	Anika Rodriguez	Mexico	UCLA
		Anjel Brown		Santa Clara
22	Mid	Arlie Jones		USC
	Fwd	Atlanta Primus	Jamaica	CSU Fullerton
2	Mid	Carolyn Greco		Sonoma State University
	Fwd	Catarina Macario	United States	Stanford
	Mid	Chelsey Patterson		CSU Fullerton
11	Def	Genessee Daughetee		Cal
00	Gk	Hillary Beall		University of Michigan
20	Fwd	Jayma Martin		Grand Valley State University
28	Mid	Jenna Nighswonger		Florida State
	Mid	Jordan Marada		USC
23	Def	Kate Wiesner		Penn State
	Mid	Kiri Dale		U of H at Manoa
7	Mid	Lindsey Huie	United States	University of Portland
	Gk	Mackenna Carmichael		USC
	Fwd	Madison Beckley		UC Santa Barbara
23	Mid	Madeline Vergura		USC
	Fwd	Madison Louderback		University of San Diego
	Mid	Maricarmen Reyes	Mexico	UCLA
18	Def	Mikhaila Bowden	Belize	Boise State University
9	Fwd	Millene Vieira		Martin Methodist College
	Def	Morgan Batcheller		CSU Fullerton
	Def	Natalie Ward		Notre Dame
16	Mid	Natsuna Sugishita		Martin Methodist College
	Fwd	Nicole Molen		USC
14	Mid	Olivia Athens	United States	UCLA
26	Fwd	Rebecca Wilson		CSU Fullerton
		Snez Veljanovska		
8	Fwd	Sonest Furtado		University of Hawaii
	HC	Scott Juniper		UC Irvine
	AC	PJ Woolridge		UC Irvine
	AC	Wendy Espejel		Soka University

== Former Players & Staff ==
No	Position	Player	Nation	Previous
		Mikhaila Bowden	Belize	(Australia) Southern United
