= Lindsey Huie =

American soccer player (born 1982)

Personal information
- Full name: Lindsey Luz Huie
- Date of birth: December 26, 1982 (age 43)
- Place of birth: New Britain, Connecticut, U.S.
- Height: 5 ft 4 in (1.63 m)
- Positions: Defender; midfielder

Team information
- Current team: LA Galaxy OC

Youth career
- So Cal Blues SC
- –2001: Mission Viejo Diablos

College career
Years	Team	Apps	(Gls)
2001–2005	Portland Pilots	99	(31)

Senior career*
Years	Team	Apps	(Gls)
2019–	LA Galaxy OC	5	(1)

International career
2000	United States U18		
2003–2005	United States U21		
2005	United States	1	(0)

Managerial career
- 2015–: CDA Slammers FC
- * Club domestic league appearances and goals

Lindsey Luz Huie (born December 26, 1982) is an American soccer player who plays as a defender or midfielder for the LA Galaxy OC, and made one appearance for the United States women's national team.

== Career ==
Huie played for the Mission Viejo Diablos in high school, where she was a three-year letter-winner, two-time All-SCL First Team player, and once chosen as the CIF Defensive Player of the Year. In college, she played for the Portland Pilots from 2001 to 2005, winning the NCAA championship in 2002 and 2005. Her 2001 season was ended prematurely due to a knee injury, though she was granted a medical hardship waiver in order to regain the season she lost. In total, she scored 31 goals and recorded 48 assists in 99 games, ranking second in the career assists for the school. She was a four-time NSCAA All-American (first team in 2004 and 2005, second team in 2003, and third team in 2002) and Soccer Buzz All-American (first team in 2003 and 2005, and second team in 2002 and 2004). Huie was also included in the NCAA All-Tournament Team in the 2005 championship-winning season. She was included in the Soccer America National MVP Team in 2003 and 2005, the Soccer America and Soccer Buzz All-Freshman Team in 2002, and was a semi-finalist for the Hermann Trophy in 2005. She was also an NSCAA Scholar All-American in 2005, as well as a CoSIDA Academic First-Team All-Region in 2003, 2004, and 2005.

Huie was played for the U.S. under-18 and under-21 national teams, winning the 2003 and 2004 Nordic Cup with the latter. She made her only international appearance for the United States on March 11, 2005 in the 2005 Algarve Cup against Finland. She came on as a substitute in the 74th minute for Lori Chalupny, with the match finishing as a 3–0 win.

In 2014, Huie was inducted into the University of Portland Athletic Hall of Fame as part of the school's 2002 championship-winning soccer team. She began coaching with the youth club CDA Slammers FC in 2015. In 2019, she returned from retirement to play club soccer for LA Galaxy OC in the UWS. She made five appearances in 2019, scoring one goal and recording two assists, and was included once in the UWS Team of the Week.

== Personal life ==
Huie was born in New Britain, Connecticut, though Mission Viejo is her hometown. She graduated from the University of Portland at the end of 2005 with a degree in psychology, and has five children.

== Career statistics ==
=== International ===
United States
Year	Apps	Goals
2005	1	0
Total	1	0

== Honors ==
Portland Pilots

- NCAA Division I women's soccer tournament: 2002
