= Angela Kelly (soccer) =

Canadian soccer player and coach (born 1971)

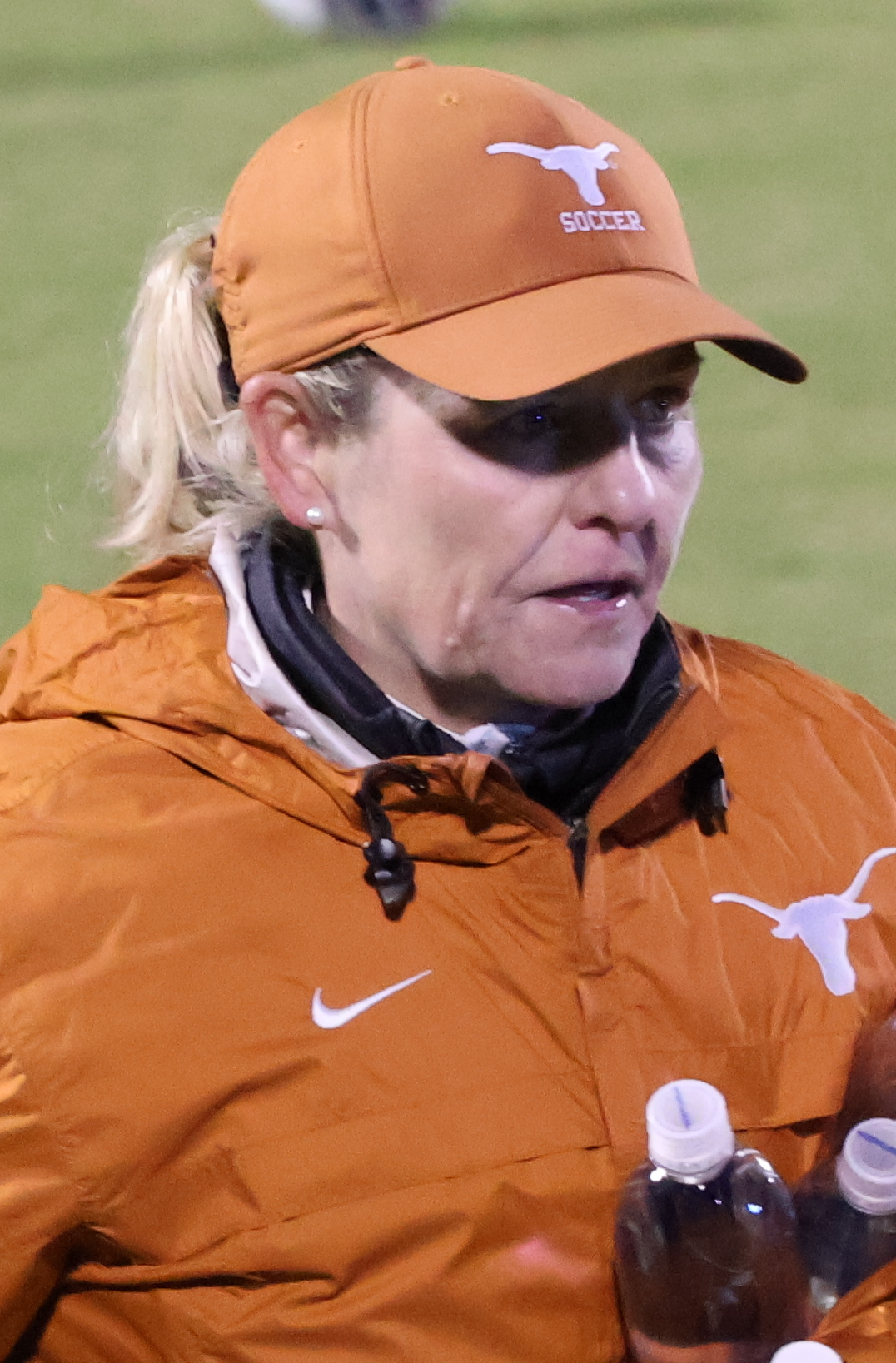
- Kelly with Texas in 2024

Personal information
- Full name: Angela Kelly
- Date of birth: 3 October 1971 (age 55)
- Place of birth: Glasgow, Scotland
- Height: 1.60 m (5 ft 3 in)
- Position: Midfielder

College career
| Years | Team | Apps | (Gls) |
| 1991–1994 | North Carolina Tar Heels | 99 | (38) |

Senior career*
| Years | Team | Apps | (Gls) |
| 1998–1999 | Raleigh Wings | | |

International career
| 1990–1995 | Canada | 29 | (1) |

Managerial career
- 1995: North Carolina Tar Heels (grad. asst.)
- 1996–1999: Tennessee Volunteers (assistant)
- 2000–2011: Tennessee Volunteers
- 2012–2025: Texas Longhorns
- * Club domestic league appearances and goals

Angela Kelly (born 3 October 1971) is a Canadian soccer coach and former player. She was most recently the head coach of the University of Texas women’s soccer team. Kelly was previously the head coach of the University of Tennessee women’s soccer team for 12 seasons.

Kelly played for North Carolina women’s soccer from 1991 to 1994, where she was an All-American as a senior.

A native of Scotland, Kelly grew up in Brantford, Ontario, Canada. She represented Canada at the international level. She earned 29 caps with the Canada women’s soccer team, including starting all three of Canada's games at the 1995 FIFA Women’s World Cup in Sweden.

She was inducted into the Canada Soccer Hall of Fame on 11 May 2004.

== Early life ==
Kelly was born in Glasgow, Scotland, on 3 October 1971. She grew up around the game of soccer as her father, John, played in the leagues in Glasgow. Her family immigrated to Canada when she was young, residing in Brantford, Ontario. Kelly graduated from North Park Collegiate and Vocational School in Brantford.

As a youth player, she was seen and scouted for the Canada women's soccer team. She played against the U.S. women's soccer team, which was coached by North Carolina women's soccer head coach Anson Dorrance at the time. Kelly was invited to attend a camp at North Carolina before the start of her senior year in high school where she was recruited for the North Carolina team.

== College career ==
Angela Kelly played for North Carolina from 1991 to 1994. Her team accumulated a 97–1–1 record during her four seasons with the Tar Heels. She previously held the record for most matches played (99) and started (94). She was a four-time NCAA Division I National Champion, four-time ACC Conference regular season champion, four-time ACC Tournament champion, and a three-time NCAA All-Tournament Team member (1992–1994). She was a first-team All-American in 1994.

She had 38 goals and 27 assists during her four years with the Tar Heels. She was named to the ACC's 50th Anniversary Team in 2002.

Her North Carolina team still holds the NCAA Division I record for consecutive wins (92) from 1990 to 1994. Those North Carolina teams also featured Mia Hamm, Kristine Lilly, and Tisha Venturini.

== Playing career ==
Kelly made her debut for the Canada National Team in April 1990 at the age of 18 years old in a 1–1 draw against USSR. She scored in the 5–0 win over USSR on 21 April 1990. She was a key part of Canada's first team to play at the Women's World Cup in 1995. She started every game during the qualifying process and every game at the 1995 FIFA Women's World Cup in Sweden.

She spent two seasons playing in the United Soccer League W-League for the Raleigh Wings from 1998 to 1999. The Wings won the national championship both years.

She considered playing in the WUSA for the inaugural season in 2000, but after speaking with legendary basketball coach Pat Summitt she decided to accept the position as head coach of the Tennessee soccer team instead.

== Coaching career ==
After graduating from North Carolina, she returned to the team as a graduate assistant coach for the 1995 season. Following that season, she joined the University of Tennessee as an assistant coach for the program's inaugural season in 1996. She worked as an assistant coach for Charlie MacCabe from 1996 until 1999 while she continued her playing career.

Kelly was hired as the head coach for Tennessee in 2000. During her 12 seasons in charge of the Tennessee program, she guided the team to eight NCAA Tournament appearances and five NCAA Sweet 16 appearances. She went 160–84–20 (.644) as the head coach at Tennessee. She was the three-time SEC Coach of the Year (2003–2005).

In December 2011, Kelly accepted the position as the head coach of women's soccer at the University of Texas. She led the Longhorns to a 8–10–2 record in 2012. She helped Texas get back to the NCAA Tournament in 2014, and led the team to an appearance in the NCAA Sweet Sixteen in 2017.

== Honours ==
=== Player ===
North Carolina Tar Heels

- NCAA National Champion (1991, 1992, 1993, 1994)
- ACC Tournament Championship (1991, 1992, 1993, 1994)
- ACC Regular Season Championship (1991, 1992, 1993, 1994)

=== Coach ===
Tennessee Volunteers

- SEC Tournament Championship (2002, 2003, 2005, 2008)
- SEC Regular Season Championship (2003, 2004, 2005)

Individual

- SEC Coach of the Year (2003, 2004, 2005)
