= Anika Rodríguez =

Mexican footballer (born 1997)

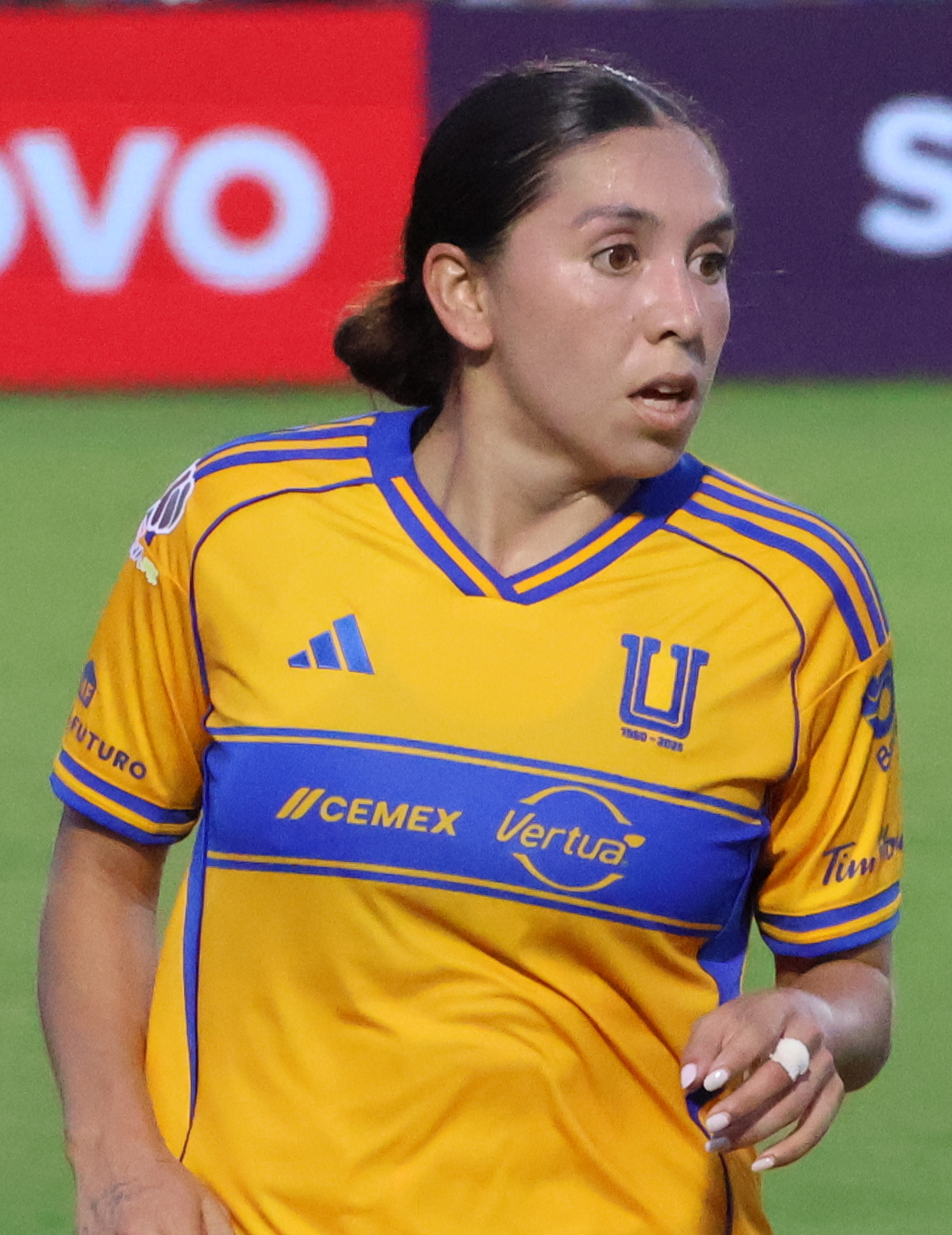
- Rodríguez with Tigres UANL in 2025

Personal information
- Full name: Anika Elia Rodríguez
- Date of birth: 4 January 1997 (age 29)
- Place of birth: Torrance, California, U.S.
- Height: 1.57 m (5 ft 2 in)
- Position: Right back

Team information
- Current team: UANL
- Number: 22

Youth career
- –2015: SoCal Blues

College career
Years	Team	Apps	(Gls)
2016–2019	UCLA Bruins	77	(15)

Senior career*
Years	Team	Apps	(Gls)
2019	LA Galaxy OC		
2020	Portland Thorns	0	(0)
2020–2022	PSV	33	(5)
2022–	UANL	80	(3)

International career^{‡}
2013	United States U-17		(1)
2018	United States U-23		
2021–	Mexico	18	(0)
Medal record
Women's football
Representing Mexico
Pan American Games
Gold medal – first place	2023 Santiago	Team
Central American and Caribbean Games
Gold medal – first place	2023 San Salvador
- * Club domestic league appearances and goals as of 2 September 2021 ‡ National team caps and goals as of 20 February 2025

Anika Elia Rodríguez (born 4 January 1997) is a professional footballer who plays as a left-back for Liga MX Femenil club Tigres UANL. Born and raised in the United States to Mexican parents, she plays for the Mexico national team.

== Early life ==
Rodríguez was born in Torrance, California. She attended Torrance High School and played youth soccer for Southern California Blues Soccer Club.

== Club career ==
=== Portland Thorns ===
In June 2020, Rodríguez signed a short-term contract with National Women's Soccer League side Portland Thorns FC ahead of the NWSL Challenge Cup.

=== PSV ===
Also in June 2020, Rodríguez signed a one-year contract with Eredivisie Vrouwen side PSV. In April 2021, she signed a one-year extension.

=== Tigres UANL ===
Rodriguez was signed by Liga MX Femenil side Tigres UANL on 18 June 2022.

== International career ==
On 23 October 2021, Rodríguez made her debut for the Mexico national team in a 6–1 victory over Argentina at Estadio Gregorio "Tepa" Gómez.

Rodríguez was selected to represent Mexico at the 2023 Pan American Games held in Santiago, Chile, where the Mexican squad went undefeated to won the gold medal for the first time in their history at the Pan American Games, defeating Chile 1–0.

== Personal life ==
Rodríguez's younger sister, Karina Rodríguez, also plays for the Mexico women's national football team.

== Honours ==
Tigres UANL

- Liga MX Femenil: Apertura 2022, Apertura 2023, Apertura 2025
- CONCACAF W Champions Cup runner-up: 2024–25
