= Shae O'Rourke =

American soccer player (born 2004)

Personal information
- Date of birth: June 14, 2004 (age 22)
- Height: 5 ft 4 in (1.63 m)
- Position: Forward

Team information
- Current team: Tennessee Volunteers
- Number: 6

Youth career
- 2012–2022: Western New York Flash

College career
Years	Team	Apps	(Gls)
2022–2023	South Carolina Gamecocks	45	(11)
2024	Texas A&M Aggies	0	(0)
2025–	Tennessee Volunteers	4	(5)

International career^{‡}
2024	United States U-20	1	(1)
- ‡ National team caps and goals as of April 7, 2024

Shae O'Rourke (born June 14, 2004) is an American college soccer player who plays as a forward for the Tennessee Volunteers. She previously played for the South Carolina Gamecocks and the Texas A&M Aggies.

== Early life ==
O'Rourke grew up in Wheatfield, New York, the youngest of three daughters born to Terry and Barb O'Rourke. She began playing soccer at a young age with her sister and her mother, who played collegiately at Niagara. Her father played hockey at Niagara, and O'Rourke played that and other sports growing up including volleyball and basketball. She joined Western New York Flash at age seven or eight, going on to earn two-time ECNL all-conference honors. She was a standout player at St. Mary's High School, setting a school record with 135 goals, the first player to pass the 100-goal mark, and leading them to two Monsignor Martin Athletic Association championships. She was named first-team all-state four times, the New York Gatorade Player of the Year in 2020, and United Soccer Coaches All-American in 2021. She committed to South Carolina as a freshman.

== College career ==
O'Rourke scored 6 goals with 3 assists in her freshman season with the South Carolina Gamecocks in 2022. She was the team's second-leading scorer behind Catherine Barry, despite starting only 4 of her 24 appearances, and earned Southeastern Conference all-freshman honors. She averaged just under 45 minutes per game in the postseason as South Carolina won the SEC tournament and advanced to the round of 16 in the NCAA tournament. O'Rourke started all 21 games in her sophomore season in 2023, scoring 5 goals and adding 3 assists, again second in points to Barry.

O'Rourke transferred to the Texas A&M Aggies for her junior season but tore the anterior cruciate ligament in her right knee during spring training, forcing her to miss the entire 2024 season. She then transferred to the Tennessee Volunteers and had a strong debut, scoring both goals in the season-opening upset against preseason number one North Carolina. She had five goals in four games before she suffered another ACL tear in the same knee.

== International career ==
O'Rourke was invited to virtual training with the United States under-17 team in 2021. She was called up to the under-20 team in April 2024, scoring in a friendly against Canada.

== Honors and awards ==
South Carolina Gamecocks

- SEC tournament: 2022

Individual

- SEC all-freshman team: 2022
