= Joe Kirt =

American soccer coach

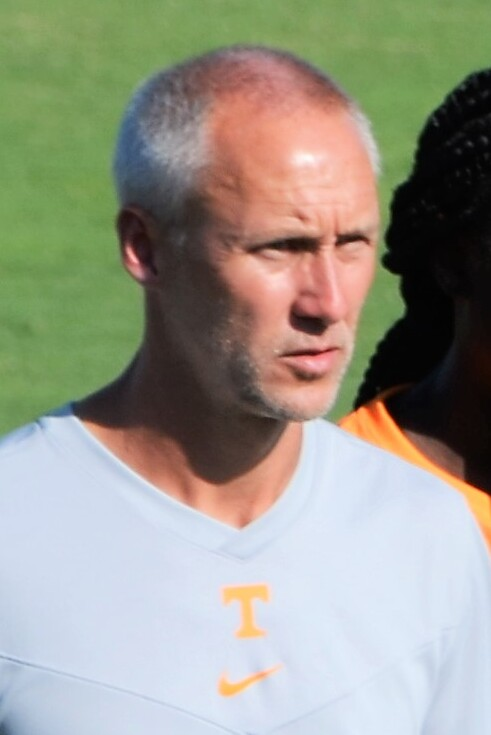
- Kirt with Tennessee in 2021

Personal information
- Date of birth: c. 1976 (age 49–50)
- Place of birth: Brookfield, Wisconsin, U.S.

Team information
- Current team: Tennessee Lady Volunteers (head coach)

College career
Years	Team	Apps	(Gls)
1997	Wisconsin–Oshkosh Titans		

Managerial career
- 2000–2005: Houston (assistant)
- 2007–2022: Tennessee (assistant)
- 2022–: Tennessee

Joe Kirt (born c. 1976) is an American college soccer coach who is the head coach of the Tennessee Lady Volunteers soccer team. He was previously an assistant coach of the Houston Cougars before later taking the assistant job at Tennessee.

== Career ==
While working towards a degree in international studies at the University of Wisconsin–Oshkosh, Kirt, a native of Brookfield, played both soccer and hockey. He earned three varsity letters as a goalkeeper. He graduated in 1998 and became an assistant soccer coach at Houston two years later. From 2005 to 2007, he was the Director of Goalkeeping at the Challenge Soccer Club in Houston.

In 2007, he took the assistant coaching job for the Tennessee Lady Volunteers, a position he held until 2022 before taking over as head coach for Brian Pensky, who went to Florida State.

== Personal life ==
Kirt is married to Susan, an eighth grade teacher, and they have two sons. They reside in Knoxville, Tennessee.
