= Michelle French =

American soccer coach and player (born 1977)

Personal information
- Full name: Michelle Ann French
- Date of birth: January 27, 1977 (age 49)
- Place of birth: Ft. Lewis, Washington, U.S.
- Position: Midfielder

College career
Years	Team	Apps	(Gls)
1995–1999	Portland Pilots		

Senior career*
Years	Team	Apps	(Gls)
2001	Washington Freedom		
2002–2003	San Jose CyberRays		
2004	Seattle Sounders Women		
2006–2009	Seattle Sounders Women		

International career
1997–1999	United States U21		
1997–2001	United States	14	(0)

Managerial career
- 2005–: United States youth
- 2005: Washington Huskies (assistant)
- 2002–2003: UCLA Bruins (assistant)
- 2012: Seattle Sounders Women
- 2013–2017: United States U20
- 2017: United States (assistant)
- 2017–: Portland Pilots
Medal record
Women's football (soccer)
Representing the United States
Olympic Games
Silver medal – second place	2000 Sydney	Team competition
- * Club domestic league appearances and goals

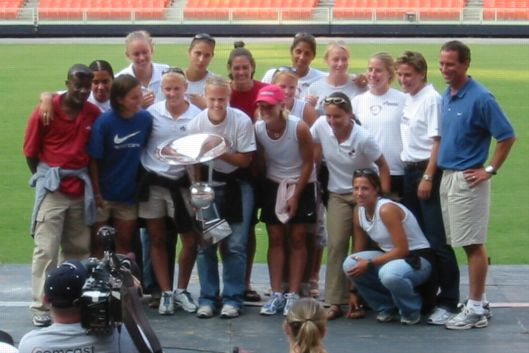
Players and coaches of the Washington Freedom pose with the Founders Cup at RFK Stadium the day after winning the 2003 WUSA championship.

Michelle Ann French (born January 27, 1977) is an American soccer assistant coach for the United States women's national soccer team. She is a former United States women's national soccer team player and received a silver medal as a member of the 2000 U.S. Olympic Team.

== Early life ==
Born in Ft. Lewis, Washington, French was a two-time Parade High School All-America at Kennedy High School in Burien, Washington.

== Playing career ==
=== Collegiate ===
French attended the University of Portland from 1995 to 1999 where she was a four-year starter for the University of Portland Pilots Women's Soccer Team.

At Portland, she appeared in three Final Fours and was a first-time All-American.

In 1997 she was a nominee and a finalist in 1998 for the Hermann Award for the National Player of the Year.

=== Club ===
French played for the Washington Freedom in the Women's United Soccer Association (WUSA) in 2001. She played with the San Jose CyberRays from 2002 to 2003.

French played in the W-League with the Seattle Sounders Women in 2004, 2006–2009.

=== International ===
French was a member of the U-21 National Team from 1994 to 1999. She captained the team at the 1997, 1998 and 1999 Nordic Cup competitions which the U.S. won in 1997 and 1999.

She was called up to the United States women's national soccer team and earned her first cap on May 11, 1997 against England.

== Coaching ==
French holds a USSF National "A" coaching license and has several years coaching experience at the youth, high school, and collegiate levels. In 2012, it was announced that she had signed a two-year contract as head coach for the Seattle Sounders Women.

In February 2013, Michelle French joined USSF as a coach for United States women's national under-20 soccer team. She worked on all aspects of the United States under-20 women's national team program and also worked with under-18 and under-17 women's national teams. French prepared the under-20 team for the 2014 FIFA U-20 Women's World Cup in Canada and the 2016 FIFA U-20 Women's World Cup in Papua New Guinea, in which the team failed to win a medal. In February 2017, US Soccer reassigned her to be a full-time assistant coach for the senior women's national team. On December 15, 2017, the University of Portland, French's alma mater, announced she had been hired to replace Garret Smith as head coach of their women's soccer program, the Portland Pilots.

== Honors ==
Michelle was awarded a Golden Scarf by the Seattle Sounders FC on June 5, 2010.

== See also ==
- United States women's national soccer team
- Seattle Sounders Women
