= Alyssa Ramsey =

American soccer player (born 1982)

Personal information
- Full name: Alyssa Marie Ramsey
- Date of birth: September 21, 1982 (age 44)
- Place of birth: Kansas City, Missouri, U.S.
- Height: 5 ft 8 in (1.73 m)
- Position: Forward

Youth career
- Charlotte Soccer Club
- –1999: North Mecklenburg Vikings

College career
| Years | Team | Apps | (Gls) |
| 2000–2003 | North Carolina Tar Heels | 102 | (57) |

International career
| 1998 | United States U16 | | |
| 1998 | United States U17 | | |
| 1999 | United States U18 | | |
| 2000 | United States U21 | | |
| 2000–2001 | United States | 8 | (0) |

Alyssa Marie Ramsey (born September 21, 1982) is an American former soccer player who played as a forward, making eight appearances for the United States women's national team.

== Career ==
Ramsey played for the North Mecklenburg Vikings in high school, where she was an NSCAA All-American as a sophomore, was named Gatorade North Carolina Female Player of the Year in 1998 and the following year in her junior year in 1999. She was also a Parade High-School All-American in 2000, though she missed her senior season of high school soccer due to residency with the national team. She also played club soccer for the youth team Charlotte Soccer Club '81 Ladies Blues, and participated in track as a freshman and basketball for one season. In college, she played for the North Carolina Tar Heels from 2000 to 2003, winning the NCAA championship in 2000 and 2003. She was an All-American during her collegiate career, having been included in the Soccer Buzz third team in 2000 and 2001, as well as being an honorable mention by Soccer Times in 2000 and Soccer Buzz in 2002. She received various honors as a freshman in 2000, having been included in the Soccer Buzz All-Region Freshman Team, the All-ACC Freshman Team, and the Freshman All-American First Team by Soccer America, Soccer Buzz, and Soccer Times. Ramsey was included in the All-ACC team in all four seasons, featuring in the first team in 2000 and the second team from 2001 to 2003, and was also included in the ACC All-Tournament Team in 2001 and 2003, the former of which she was named as the tournament MVP. She also received All-Region honors in all four seasons, having been included in the NSCAA first team in 2001 and third team in 2002, as well as in the Soccer Buzz first team in 2000 and 2001, second team in 2002, and third team in 2003. She was included in the NCAA All-Tournament Team in 2003, and was a finalist for the Hermann Trophy in 2002. In total, she scored 57 goals and recorded 71 assists in 102 appearances for the Tar Heels. Her tally of career assists ranks second in school history, only one short of the record set by Mia Hamm.

Ramsey played for the under-16, under-17, under-18, and under-21 U.S. national teams. She made her international debut for the United States on February 6, 2000 in a friendly match against Norway. In total, she made eight appearances for the U.S., earning her final cap on March 17, 2001 in the 2001 Algarve Cup against the same opponent, Norway.

== Personal life ==
Ramsey was born in Kansas City, Missouri, though she grew up in Charlotte, North Carolina. Her grandfather, Knox Ramsey, was an American football player in the NFL.

== Career statistics ==
=== International ===
United States
| Year | Apps | Goals |
|---|---|---|
| 2000 | 3 | 0 |
| 2001 | 5 | 0 |
| Total | 8 | 0 |

== Honors ==
North Carolina Tar Heels

- NCAA Division I women's soccer tournament: 2000, 2003
