= Staci Burt =

Retired American soccer player

Personal information
- Date of birth: May 28, 1978 (age 48)
- Place of birth: Salt Lake City, Utah
- Position: Defender

College career
Years	Team	Apps	(Gls)
1996–2000	Utah Utes		(38)

Senior career*
Years	Team	Apps	(Gls)
1999–2000	Chicago Cobras		(1)
2001–2003	Carolina Courage	62	(2)
- * Club domestic league appearances and goals

Staci Burt (born May 28, 1978, in Salt Lake City) is a retired American soccer player who played for the Carolina Courage.

== Education and career ==
Burt was born in Salt Lake City on May 28, 1978. She graduated from Cottonwood High School in 1996, then from the University of Utah in 2000.

== Career ==
Burt made her professional debut with the USL W-League playing for the Chicago Cobras. She later joined the Women's United Soccer Association (WUSA), where she played for the Carolina Courage, winning the 2002 WUSA Founders Cup Championship.

In 2001, Burt was invited to try out for the U.S. women's national team.
