= Emily Burt =

American former professional soccer player

Personal information
- Full name: Emily Kendall Burt
- Date of birth: April 25, 1975 (age 51)
- Place of birth: Honolulu, Hawaii, U.S.
- Height: 5 ft 3 in (1.60 m)
- Position: Forward

College career
Years	Team	Apps	(Gls)
1993–1997	Stanford Cardinal		

Senior career*
Years	Team	Apps	(Gls)
- Foothill FC
2001–2003	Atlanta Beat	32	(2)
2003	Philadelphia Charge	15	(2)
- California Storm
2004	FC Energy Voronezh	8	(1)
- * Club domestic league appearances and goals

Emily Kendall Burt (born April 25, 1975) is an American former professional soccer player who featured primarily as a forward.

== Early life ==
Burt was born in Honolulu, Hawaii. She was raised in Menlo Park, California, and attended Menlo-Atherton High School. Burt later attended Stanford University, where she was a member of the Stanford Cardinal women's soccer and tennis teams. She took a hiatus from soccer in 1995 to focus on tennis, but returned to the sport the following season.

== Career ==
Burt played for Foothill FC of the Women's Premier Soccer League while working in the tech industry. She was selected in the 12th round of the 2000 WUSA Draft by the Atlanta Beat as the 96th overall selection.

When the WUSA ceased operations, Burt joined California Storm followed by Russian Women's Football Championship club FC Energy Voronezh.

== Career statistics ==
=== Club ===
These statistics are incomplete and currently represent a portion of Burt's career.

Appearances and goals by club, season and competition
Club	Season	League			Other		Total	
Club	Season	Division	Apps	Goals	Apps	Goals	Apps	Goals
Atlanta Beat	2001	WUSA	15	2	0	0	15	2
Atlanta Beat	2002	WUSA	14	0	1	0	15	0
Atlanta Beat	2003	WUSA	3	0	0	0	3	0
Atlanta Beat	Atlanta Beat total		32	2	1	0	33	2
Philadelphia Charge	2003	WUSA	15	2	0	0	15	2
Philadelphia Charge	Philadelphia Charge total		15	2	0	0	15	2
FC Energy Voronezh	2004	RWFC	8	1	0	0	8	1
FC Energy Voronezh	FC Energy Voronezh total		8	1	0	0	8	1
Career total			55	5	1	0	56	5
