= 2002 NCAA Division I women's soccer tournament =

2002 NCAA women's soccer tournament
Women's College Cup (semifinals & final)
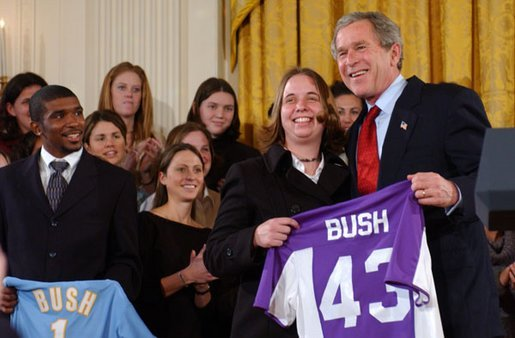
- The Portland players with President George Bush

Tournament details
- Country: United States
- Dates: November 14 – December 8, 2002
- Teams: 64

Final positions
- Champions: Portland Pilots (1st title, 7th College Cup)
- Runners-up: Santa Clara Broncos (2nd title match, 9th College Cup)
- Semifinalists: North Carolina Tar Heels (21st College Cup); Penn State Nittany Lions (2nd College Cup)

Tournament statistics
- Matches played: 63
- Goals scored: 177 (2.81 per match)
- Attendance: 59,410 (943 per match)
- Top goal scorer(s): Christine Sinclair, UP (10G, 1A)

Awards
- Best player: Christine Sinclair, UP (Offensive); Jessica Ballweg, SCU (Defensive)

The 2002 NCAA Division I women's soccer tournament (also known as the 2002 Women's College Cup) was the 21st annual single-elimination tournament to determine the national champion of NCAA Division I women's collegiate soccer. The semifinals and championship game were played at Mike A. Myers Stadium in Austin, Texas from December 6–8, 2002.

Portland defeated Santa Clara in the final, 2–1 (in two overtimes), to win their first national title. The Pilots (20–4–2) were coached by Clive Charles. This was only the second title match, to date, to not feature North Carolina (the other was in 1998).

The most outstanding offensive player was Christine Sinclair from Portland, and the most outstanding defensive player was Jessica Ballweg from Santa Clara. Sinclair and Ballweg, along with nine other players, were named to the All-Tournament team.

Sinclair was also the tournament's leading scorer, with a record 10 goals. This remains, as of 2015, the most goals scored by a single player during a Women's College Cup tournament.

== Qualification ==
All Division I women's soccer programs were eligible to qualify for the tournament. The tournament field remained fixed at 64 teams.

== Format ==
Just as before, the final two rounds, deemed the Women's College Cup, were played at a pre-determined neutral site. All other rounds were played on campus sites at the home field of the higher-seeded team. The only exceptions were the first two rounds, which were played at regional campus sites. The top sixteen teams, only eight of which were actually seeded, hosted four teams at their home fields during the tournament's first weekend.

=== National seeds ===
1. Stanford (18–1-0)
2. North Carolina (17–1–4)
3. Pepperdine (16–1–2)
4. Connecticut (18–2–1)
5. West Virginia (17–2–1)
6. Santa Clara (15–4–1)
7. UCLA (16–3-0)
8. Portland (14–4–2)

=== Records ===
Stanford Regional
Seed	School	Conference	Berth Type	Record
	BYU	Mountain West	Automatic	16–5-0
	Cal Poly	Big West	Automatic	14–6-0
	California	Pac-10	At-large	11–7–1
	Charlotte	Conference USA	At-large	16–1–2
	Clemson	ACC	At-large	14–6-0
	Denver	Sun Belt	Automatic	17–1–2
	Eastern Illinois	Ohio Valley	Automatic	12–7–2
	Idaho State	Big Sky	Automatic	13–6–1
	James Madison	CAA	Automatic	12–7–3
	Notre Dame	Big East	At-large	11–7-0
	Ohio State	Big Ten	Automatic	8–10–3
8	Portland	West Coast	At-large	14–4–2
	Purdue	Big Ten	At-large	13–4–3
	Richmond	Atlantic 10	Automatic	13–5–2
1	Stanford	Pac-10	Automatic	18–1-0
	Utah	Mountain West	At-large	12–3–3

Pepperdine Regional
Seed	School	Conference	Berth Type	Record
	Arizona State	Pac-10	At-large	11–6–2
	Creighton	Missouri Valley	Automatic	12–7–2
	Hartford	America East	Automatic	14–6-0
	Marquette	Conference USA	At-large	13–7–3
	Miami (OH)	MAC	Automatic	18–2–2
	Michigan	Big Ten	At-large	13–5–2
	Michigan State	Big Ten	At-large	12–6–2
	Milwaukee	Horizon	Automatic	11–5–5
	Nebraska	Big 12	Automatic	14–5–3
	Oakland	Mid-Continent	Automatic	10–11–1
3	Pepperdine	West Coast	Auto (shared)	16–1–2
6	Santa Clara	West Coast	Auto (shared)	15–4–1
	Villanova	Big East	At-large	14–2–4
	Washington State	Pac-10	At-large	11–6–2
	Wisconsin	Big Ten	At-large	12–7–3
	Yale	Ivy League	At-large	11–4–2

Connecticut Regional
Seed	School	Conference	Berth Type	Record
	American	Patriot	Automatic	10–8–2
	Auburn	SEC	At-large	14–4–2
	Central Conn. State	Northeast	Automatic	14–5–1
4	Connecticut	Big East	Automatic	18–2–1
	Dartmouth	Ivy League	At-large	12–4–1
	Dayton	Atlantic 10	At-large	17–3-0
	Florida State	ACC	At-large	11–6–3
	Loyola (MD)	MAAC	Automatic	12–5–2
	Maryland	ACC	At-large	12–7–1
	Mississippi	SEC	At-large	13–4–2
	Penn State	Big Ten	At-large	15–3–1
	Princeton	Ivy League	Automatic	13–2–1
	Rhode Island	Atlantic 10	At-large	15–4–1
	UCF	Atlantic Sun	Automatic	18–4-0
	Virginia	ACC	At-large	11–6–2
5	West Virginia	Big East	At-large	17–2–1

North Carolina Regional
Seed	School	Conference	Berth Type	Record
	Cincinnati	Conference USA	Automatic	16–3–3
	Furman	Southern	Automatic	16–5–1
	Kentucky	SEC	At-large	11–8-0
	Loyola Marymount	West Coast	At-large	10–6–3
2	North Carolina	ACC	Automatic	17–1–4
	Northwestern State	Southland	Automatic	12–5–5
	Radford	Big South	Automatic	15–4–1
	San Diego	West Coast	At-large	11–6–3
	SMU	WAC	Automatic	12–5–4
	Tennessee	SEC	Automatic	16–5–1
	Texas	Big 12	At-large	15–4–1
	Texas A&M	Big 12	At-large	17–4–1
7	UCLA	Pac-10	At-large	16–3-0
	USC	Pac-10	At-large	10–7–3
	Wake Forest	ACC	At-large	12–7–1
	William & Mary	CAA	At-large	13–6–1

== Bracket ==
=== Stanford Bracket ===
First round November 14–15; Regional Campus Sites
1	Stanford	4
Cal Poly	0
Stanford, CA
California	2
Denver	0
Notre Dame	3
Ohio State	1
South Bend, IN
Purdue	1(3)
Eastern Illinois	1(1)
UNC Charlotte	0
James Madison	1
Charlotte, NC
Clemson	0
Richmond	1
BYU	2
Utah (OT)	3
Provo, UT
8	Portland	3
Idaho State	0

Second round November 16–17; Regional Campus Sites
1	Stanford (OT)	1
California	0
Notre Dame	3
Purdue	1
James Madison	0
Richmond	1
Utah	0
8	Portland	3

Third Round; November 23–24; Campus Sites
1	Stanford*	1
Notre Dame	0
Richmond	0
8	Portland*	4

Quarterfinals; November 29–30; Campus Sites
1	Stanford*	0(2)
8	Portland	0(4)

=== Storrs Bracket ===
First round November 14–15; Regional Campus Sites
5	West Virginia	3
Loyola–Maryland	0
Morgantown, WV
Virginia	3
Dayton	2
Maryland	1
American	0
College Park, MD
Penn State	2
Princeton	0
Florida State	2
Ole Miss	0
Tallahassee, FL
Auburn	2
Central Florida	0
Rhode Island	2
Dartmouth	1
Storrs, CT
4	Connecticut	2
Central Connecticut	0

Second round November 16–17; Regional Campus Sites
5	West Virginia	0
Virginia	1
Maryland	1
Penn State	2
Florida State	2
Auburn	1
Rhode Island	1
4	Connecticut (OT)	2

Third Round; November 23–24; Campus Sites
Virginia	0
Penn State*	3
Florida State	0
4	Connecticut*	1

Quarterfinals; November 29–30; Campus Sites
Penn State	2
4	Connecticut*	1

=== Santa Clara Bracket ===
First round November 14–15; Regional Campus Sites
3	Pepperdine	2
Wisconsin–Milwaukee	0
Milwaukee, WI
Marquette	2
Wisconsin	3
Michigan	1
Oakland	0
Ann Arbor, MI
Miami (OH)	2
Michigan State	1
Nebraska	2
Hartford	0
Villanova, PA
Villanova	0(2)
Yale	0(4)
Arizona State	2
Washington State	1
Santa Clara, CA
6	Santa Clara	5
Creighton	1

Second round November 16–17; Regional Campus Sites
3	Pepperdine (OT)	2
Wisconsin	1
Michigan	4
Miami (OH)	0
Nebraska	1
Yale	0
Arizona State	1
6	Santa Clara	5

Third Round; November 23–24; Campus Sites
3	Pepperdine	0
Michigan*	2
Nebraska	2
6	Santa Clara	3

Quarterfinals; November 29–30; Campus Sites
Michigan	1
6	Santa Clara*	3

=== Chapel Hill Bracket ===
First round November 14–15; Regional Campus Sites
7	UCLA	4
Loyola Marymount	0
Los Angeles, CA
USC (OT)	1
San Diego	0
Texas A&M	8
Northwestern State	0
College Station, TX
Texas	1
SMU	2
Tennessee	5
Furman	1
Knoxville, TN
Cincinnati	1
Kentucky	0
Wake Forest	2
William & Mary	0
Chapel Hill, NC
2	North Carolina	6
Radford	1

Second round November 16–17; Regional Campus Sites
7	UCLA (2OT)	1
USC	0
Texas A&M	1(3)
SMU	1(2)
Tennessee	2
Cincinnati	1
Wake Forest	1
2	North Carolina	3

Third Round; November 23–24; Campus Sites
7	UCLA*	0(1)
Texas A&M	0(3)
Tennessee	1
2	North Carolina*	3

Quarterfinals; November 29–30; Campus Sites
Texas A&M	0
2	North Carolina*	3

=== College Cup ===
Semifinals; December 6 Mike A. Myers Stadium; Austin, Texas
8	Portland	2
Penn State	0
6	Santa Clara	2
2	North Carolina	1

Championship; December 8 Mike A. Myers Stadium; Austin, Texas
8	Portland (2OT)	2
6	Santa Clara	1

== All-tournament team ==
- Lauren Arase, Portland
- Jessica Ballweg, Santa Clara (most outstanding defensive player)
- Devyn Hawkins, Santa Clara
- Joanna Lohman, Penn State
- Erin Misaki, Portland
- Lauren Orlandos, Portland
- Catherine Reddick, North Carolina
- Christine Sinclair, Portland (most outstanding offensive player)
- Lindsay Tarpley, North Carolina
- Aly Wagner, Santa Clara
- Veronica Zepeda, Santa Clara

== See also ==
- NCAA Women's Soccer Championships (Division II, Division III)
- NCAA Men's Soccer Championships (Division I, Division II, Division III)
