= Tara Koleski =

American soccer player

Personal information
- Date of birth: July 20, 1977 (age 49)
- Place of birth: Phoenix, Arizona, United States
- Position: Forward

College career
Years	Team	Apps	(Gls)
1996–1998	Portland Pilots		

Senior career*
Years	Team	Apps	(Gls)
1999–2000	1. FC Saarbrücken		
2001	San Diego Spirit	19	(4)
2002	Philadelphia Charge	6	(0)
2003	New York Power		

International career
1996–1997	United States U21		

Managerial career
- 2003–2006: West Chester Golden Rams
- 2006–2008: UMBC Retrievers
- 2008: Northern Iowa Panthers
- 2013–2015: Dominican Penguins
- 2024: Mansfield Mountaineers
- * Club domestic league appearances and goals

Tara Koleski (born July 20, 1977, in Phoenix, Arizona) is a retired American soccer player who played for the Philadelphia Charge and the United States national soccer team.

== Early life and education ==
Koleski was born in Phoenix, Arizona on July 20, 1977. She graduated from Xavier College Preparatory in 1995. She went on to earn a Bachelor of Arts in sociology from the University of Portland in 1999. She later obtained master's degrees from Harvard University, where she studied strategic non-profit management and entrepreneurship, and Northern Arizona University, where she studied administrative leadership.

== Career ==
=== Athletic career ===
From 1996 to 1997, Koleski was a member of the United States women's national under-21 soccer team.

While studying at the University of Portland, she played on the school's women's soccer team, where earned All-American honors, among other honors. In 1996 and 1998, the team reached the finals at the National Collegiate Athletic Association.

Koleski made her professional debut in 1999, playing in Germany for Bundesliga for 1. FC Saarbrücken, where she remained for two seasons. After the formation of the Women's United Soccer Association (WUSA) in 2001, she was drafted in the eleventh round to play for the San Diego Spirit. That season, she "became the first WUSA player to score in three consecutive games". During this time, she was called up for the US women's national team. In 2002, she transferred to the Philadelphia Charge, followed by the New York Power in 2003, after which WUSA folded.

=== Coaching ===
While playing for the Philadelphia Charge in 2002, Koleski took a position as the head coach of The Baldwin School's varsity soccer team, as well as a volunteer assistant coach at Villanova University.

In 2003, Koleski served as the assistant coach of West Chester University's women's soccer team; she took over as head coach the following year. During her tenure, the team experienced great success, and "Koleski was named the 2005 National Soccer Coaches Association of America (NSCAA) Northeast Region Coach of the Year, the Southeast Pennsylvania Coaches Association (SEPCA) Women's College Coach of the Year, and Pennsylvania State Athletic Conference (PSAC) East Coach of the Year."

Following her time at West Chester, Koleski coached at the Dominican University of California, University of Maryland, Baltimore County, and University of Northern Iowa.

As of 2023, she was the head coach for FC Arizona, a United Women's Soccer team, as well as FC Arizona's Director of Coaching. She also serves as a Sports Diplomat for the United States Department of State, and the vice president of Building Pathways, a non-profit youth soccer club.

In May 2024, she was named the head coach for Mansfield Mountaineers.

== Personal life ==
Koleski has two children.
