= Berna Kabakci =

Macedonian footballer (born 2004)

Personal information
- Date of birth: 26 May 2004 (age 22)
- Place of birth: Zutphen, Netherlands
- Height: 1.73 m (5 ft 8 in)
- Position: Goalkeeper

Team information
- Current team: Utah Utes
- Number: 29

Youth career
- VV Eldenia
- –2023: FC Bergh

College career
Years	Team	Apps	(Gls)
2023–2026	Carson–Newman Eagles		

Senior career*
Years	Team	Apps	(Gls)
2025	UMF Einherji		
2026–	Olympia Bocholt		

International career
2024–	North Macedonia	4	(0)
- * Club domestic league appearances and goals

Berna Kabakci (Macedonian: Берна Кабачки; born 26 May 2004) is a footballer who plays as a goalkeeper for Utah Utes. Born in the Netherlands, she is a North Macedonia international.

== Early life ==
Kabakci was born on 26 May 2004. Born in Zutphen, Netherlands, she is a native of 's-Heerenberg, Netherlands. Growing up, she played volleyball and attended Ulenhofcollege in the Netherlands. Subsequently, she attended Carson–Newman University in the United States.

== Club career ==
As a youth player, Kabakci joined the youth academy of Dutch side FC Bergh. Following her stint there, she joined the youth academy of Dutch side VV Eldenia.

== International career ==
Kabakci is a North Macedonia international. During April, May, June, and July 2024, she played for the North Macedonia women's national football team for UEFA Women's Euro 2025 qualifying.
