= Atlanta Primus =

Jamaican footballer (born 1997)

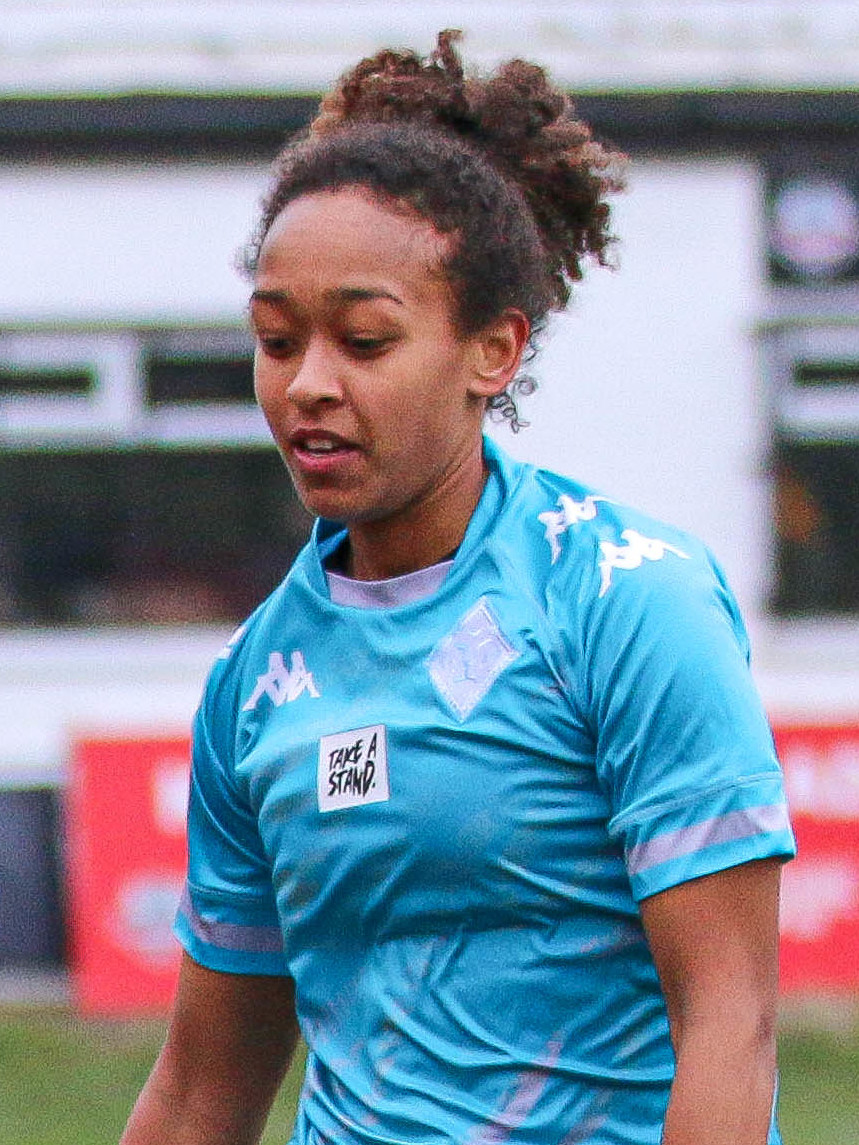
- Atlanta Primus competing for London City Lionesses, February 2021

Personal information
- Full name: Atlanta Reigan Primus
- Date of birth: 21 April 1997 (age 29)
- Place of birth: London, England
- Height: 1.73 m (5 ft 8 in)
- Position: Midfielder

Team information
- Current team: Sunderland
- Number: 20

Youth career
- Chelsea

College career
| Years | Team | Apps | (Gls) |
| 2016–2019 | Cal State Fullerton Titans | 72 | (25) |

Senior career*
| Years | Team | Apps | (Gls) |
| 2014–2015 | Chelsea | 1 | (0) |
| 2019 | LA Galaxy OC | | |
| 2020–2023 | London City Lionesses | 58 | (15) |
| 2023–2026 | Southampton | 30 | (5) |
| 2024–2025 | → Charlton Athletic (loan) | 10 | (1) |
| 2026– | Sunderland | 8 | (0) |

International career^{‡}
| 2013 | England U17 | 4 | (1) |
| 2016 | England U19 | 1 | (0) |
| 2021– | Jamaica | 25 | (1) |
Medal record
Representing Jamaica
CONCACAF W Championship
| Third place | 2022 Mexico |
- * Club domestic league appearances and goals as of 15 November 2026 ‡ National team caps and goals as of 14 October 2026

Atlanta Reigan Primus (born 21 April 1997) is a Jamaican professional footballer who plays as a midfielder for Sunderland. Born in England, the midfielder plays for the Jamaica women's national team.

== Club career ==
On 5 September 2020, Primus signed for London City, extending her contract by a further year on 16 June 2021.

On 15 August 2023, Primus signed for Southampton.

On 17 September 2024, Primus signed for Charlton Athletic on a season-long loan.

On 26 July 2025, it was announced that Primus had signed a new contract with Southampton to extend her time with the club for a further year.

On 25 July 2026, Primus was announced at Sunderland.

== International career ==
Primus represented Jamaica in a friendly match against Costa Rica. After being called up for the Jamaica squad for the 2023 World Cup Primus started in the opening game against France, where the nation achieved their first point ever at a Woman's World Cup.

== International goals ==
| No. | Date | Venue | Opponent | Score | Result | Competition |
|---|---|---|---|---|---|---|
| 1. | 29 November 2025 | Daren Sammy Cricket Ground, Gros Islet, Saint Lucia | Dominica | 5–0 | 18–0 | 2026 CONCACAF W Championship qualification |

== Personal life ==
Primus is the daughter of former Charlton, Reading and Portsmouth footballer Linvoy Primus. Through her father, she is of Jamaican and Vincentian descent. Growing up she attended Itchen College in Southampton.
