= Justi Baumgardt =

American soccer player (born 1975)

Personal information
- Full name: Justi Michelle Baumgardt-Yamada
- Birth name: Justi Michelle Baumgardt
- Date of birth: July 22, 1975 (age 51)
- Place of birth: Renton, Washington, United States
- Height: 5 ft 8 in (1.73 m)
- Position: Midfielder

Team information
- Current team: Midlakes United (manager)

College career
| Years | Team | Apps | (Gls) |
| 1993–1997 | Portland Pilots | | |

Senior career*
| Years | Team | Apps | (Gls) |
| 2000 | Sacramento Storm | | |
| 2001–2002 | Washington Freedom | | |
| 2002–2003 | New York Power | | |
| 2006 | Seattle Sounders Women | 6 | (0) |
| 2010 | Seattle Sounders Women | 8 | (0) |

International career
| 1993–1998 | United States | 16 | (3) |

Managerial career
- 2023–: Midlakes United
- * Club domestic league appearances and goals

Justi Michelle Baumgardt-Yamada (née Baumgardt; born July 22, 1975) is an American soccer coach and retired player who was a member of the United States women's national soccer team, where she played as a midfielder.

Baumgardt was named the head coach of USL League Two team Midlakes United in 2023.

== International career statistics ==
| Nation | Year | International Appearances | | | | |
| Nation | Year | Apps | Starts | Minutes | Goals | Assists |
|---|---|---|---|---|---|---|
| United States | 1993 | 1 | 0 | 14 | 0 | 0 |
| United States | 1997 | 9 | 2 | 461 | 2 | 1 |
| United States | 1998 | 6 | 1 | 232 | 1 | 1 |
| Career Total | 3 | 16 | 3 | 707 | 3 | 2 |
