= Trina Maso de Moya =

Retired American soccer player

Personal information
- Date of birth: January 25, 1980 (age 46)
- Place of birth: Fort Lauderdale, Florida
- Height: 6 ft 0 in (1.83 m)
- Position: Forward

College career
Years	Team	Apps	(Gls)
2002	Florida Atlantic Owls	19	(19)

Senior career*
Years	Team	Apps	(Gls)
2003	Philadelphia Charge	9	(0)
- * Club domestic league appearances and goals

Trina Maso de Moya is a retired American soccer player who used to play for the Philadelphia Charge. While studying at Wake Forest University, she played on the university's volleyball team and was later inducted into their Sports Hall of Fame.

== Education ==
Maso de Moya was raised in Fort Lauderdale, Florida. She graduated from St. Thomas Aquinas High School in 1998, Wake Forest University in 2002, and Florida Atlantic University in 2003.

== Athletic career ==
After graduating from high school, Maso de Moya played volleyball at Wake Forest University. During her last two years at the university, she was named an Atlantic Coast Conference (ACC) All-Conference player. In 2000, she was named the ACC Player of the Year; she was also selected for the 50th anniversary All-ACC Volleyball team.

Using her fifth year of eligibility, Maso de Moya transferred to Florida Atlantic University (FAU) to play soccer. In her sole season at FAU, she set six single-season records, including goals, points, shots, game-winning goals, consecutive games with a goal, and consecutive games with a point.

In 2003, after finishing her university career, Maso de Moya joined the Philadelphia Charge.

== Honors ==
In 2014, Maso de Moya was inducted into Wake Forest University’s Sports Hall of Fame.

== Personal ==
As of 2014, Maso de Moya lived in South Florida with her husband and son.
