= Erin Misaki =

American soccer player (born 1981)

Personal information
- Full name: Erin Kiku Misaki
- Date of birth: November 23, 1981 (age 44)
- Place of birth: Tarzana, California, United States
- Height: 1.59 m (5 ft 3 in)
- Position: Midfielder

College career
Years	Team	Apps	(Gls)
1999–2002	Portland Pilots		

Senior career*
Years	Team	Apps	(Gls)
2003	Philadelphia Charge	14	(0)
- * Club domestic league appearances and goals

Erin Kiku Misaki (November 23, 1981) is an American soccer player who played for the Philadelphia Charge.

== Career ==
Misaki attended the University of Portland and played for the university team whilst earning was an NCAA Division I women's soccer championship in 2002. Misaki's success in college soccer lead her to be spotted by professional soccer teams in the Women's United Soccer Association.

Misaki was a second round pick for the 2003 WUSA Draft for the Philadelphia Charge. Since retiring from professional soccer, Misaki works in administration for US Youth Soccer Association.

== Honors ==
Portland Pilots

- NCAA Division I women's soccer tournament: 2002
