= Rhiannon Tanaka =

American soccer player

Personal information
- Date of birth: November 29, 1976 (age 49)
- Place of birth: Anaheim, California, United States
- Height: 1.71 m (5 ft 7 in)
- Position: Defender

College career
Years	Team	Apps	(Gls)
1994	USC Trojans		
1996–1997	UCLA Bruins		

Senior career*
Years	Team	Apps	(Gls)
2001–2003	San Diego Spirit	36	(0)
- * Club domestic league appearances and goals

Rhiannon Tanaka is a retired American footballer who played as defender for San Diego Spirit.

== Soccer career ==
While studying at UCLA, Tanaka played for the school's soccer team. She played for the San Diego Spirit from 2001 to 2003. Tanaka played 32 out of 35 games during the first two WUSA seasons.
