= Mary McVeigh =

American soccer player (born 1981)

Personal information
- Date of birth: November 1, 1981 (age 44)
- Place of birth: Philadelphia, Pennsylvania, United States
- Height: 5 ft 9 in (1.75 m)
- Position: Midfielder

College career
Years	Team	Apps	(Gls)
1999–2002	Dartmouth Big Green	60	(25)

Senior career*
Years	Team	Apps	(Gls)
2003	Philadelphia Charge	18	(0)
2004	ÍBV		
- * Club domestic league appearances and goals

Mary McVeigh is an American former soccer player who played as a midfielder for the Philadelphia Charge. Since retiring McVeigh has run the charity Soccer Without Borders.
