= Portland Pilots women's soccer =

American college soccer team

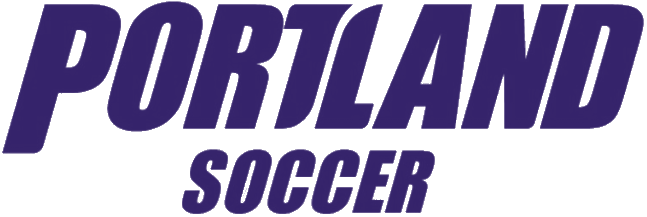
- Founded: 1980; 46 years ago
- University: University of Portland
- Head coach: Michelle French (8th season)
- Conference: WCC
- Location: Portland, Oregon, US
- Stadium: Merlo Field (capacity: 4,892)
- Nickname: Pilots
- Colors: Purple and white
Home	Away

NCAA tournament championships
- 2002, 2005

NCAA tournament runner-up
- 1995

NCAA tournament College Cup
- 1994, 1995, 1996, 1998, 2000, 2001, 2002, 2005

NCAA tournament Quarterfinals
- 1993, 1994, 1995, 1996, 1998, 2000, 2001, 2002, 2004, 2005, 2006, 2007, 2008, 2009

NCAA tournament appearances
- 1992, 1993, 1994, 1995, 1996, 1997, 1998, 2000, 2001, 2002, 2003, 2004, 2005, 2006, 2007, 2008, 2009, 2010, 2011, 2012, 2013, 2022

The Portland Pilots women's soccer team represents the University of Portland in National Collegiate Athletic Association Division I women's soccer. The team competes in the West Coast Conference and is currently coached by Michelle French. The Pilots won national championships in 2002 and 2005.

== All-Time Coaching Records ==
All-Time Coaching Records
Years	Coach	Records
1980	Ken Robinette	4–9–2 (.333)
1981–1985	Gordon Williamson	40–34–12 (.535)
1986–1988	Jim Tursi	35–17–5 (.658)
1989–2002	Clive Charles	225–52–14 (.797)
2003–2017	Garrett Smith	222–78–24 (.722)
2018–present	Michelle French	60–41–21 (.578)

== Year-by-year statistical leaders ==
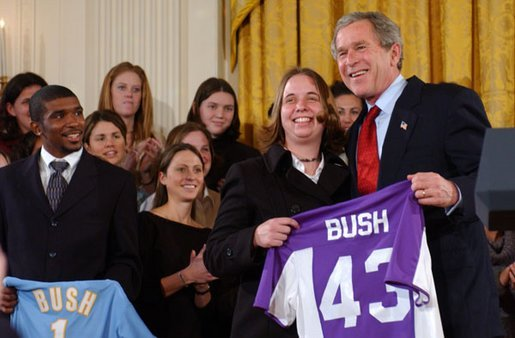
The team with U.S. president George Bush in 2003

Year-by-Year Statistical Leaders
Year	Goals leader	Gls.	Assists leader	Ass.
1980	Not available	N/A	Not available	N/A
1981	Melissa Borello	10	Melissa Borello	7
1982	Linda Brock	13	Linda Brock	7
1983	Linda Brock	14	Kathy Johnsen	10
1984	Becky Treick	14	Kathy Johnsen	11
1985	Gina Anthony	17	Dawn Wagner	10
1986	Kris Kent	16	Kris Wallace	11
1987	Angela Benedetti	10	Kristi Hickox	7
1988	Kristy Despars	13	Kristy Despars	4
1989	Kristi Wiese	9	Cindy Griffith	7
1990	Tori Rogel	20	Tiffeny Milbrett	14
1991	Tiffeny Milbrett	25	Cindy Griffith	7
1992	Tiffeny Milbrett	30	Tiffeny Milbrett	12
1993	Shannon MacMillan	23	Justi Baumgardt	12
1993	Shannon MacMillan	23	Shannon MacMillan	12
1994	Tiffeny Milbrett	30	Tiffeny Milbrett	8
1995	Shannon MacMillan	23	Shannon MacMillan	16
1996	Justi Baumgardt	13	Justi Baumgardt	13
1997	Justi Baumgardt	11	Michelle French	14
1998	Tara Koleski	18	Tara Koleski	11
1999	Vanessa Talbott	12	Erin Misaki	9
2000	Vanessa Talbott	15	Emily Patterson	10
2001	Christine Sinclair	23	Christine Sinclair	8
2001	Christine Sinclair	23	Kristen Moore	8
2002	Christine Sinclair	26	Emily Patterson	9
2003	Lindsey Huie	12	Lindsey Huie	13
2004	Christine Sinclair	22	Lindsey Huie	14
2005	Christine Sinclair	39	Lindsey Huie	14
2006	Michelle Enyeart	16	Angie Woznuk	13
2007	Michelle Enyeart	12	Michelle Enyeart	15
2008	Danielle Foxhoven	16	Megan Rapinoe	13
2009	Danielle Foxhoven	25	Michelle Enyeart	12
2009	Danielle Foxhoven	25	Danielle Foxhoven	12
2009	Danielle Foxhoven	25	Sophie Schmidt	12
2010	Micaela Capelle	8	Taylor Brooke	5
2010	Micaela Capelle	8	Micaela Capelle	5
2010	Danielle Foxhoven	8	Danielle Foxhoven	5
2010	Danielle Foxhoven	8	Elli Reed	5
2010	Danielle Foxhoven	8	Sophie Schmidt	5
2011	Danielle Foxhoven	8	Micaela Capelle	7
2012	Amanda Frisbie	12	Amanda Frisbie	9
2013	Micaela Capelle	9	Micaela Capelle	7
2013	Micaela Capelle	9	Danica Evans	7
2014	Danica Evans	7	Allison Wetherington	4
2015	Noelle La Prevotte	10	Allison Wetherington	5
2015	Cecilia Pedersen	10	Allison Wetherington	5
2016	Hannah Griffiths Boston	8	Allison Wetherington	5
2017	Hannah Griffiths Boston	2	Lucy Davidson	1
2017	Hannah Griffiths Boston	2	Hannah Griffiths Boston	1
2017	Hannah Griffiths Boston	2	Kim Hazlett	1
2017	Larkin Russell	2	Taryn Ries	1
2017	Larkin Russell	2	Kendra Steele	1
2017	Larkin Russell	2	Kaycie Young	1
2018	Taryn Ries	15	Larkin Russell	8
2019	Taryn Ries	8	Taryn Ries	4
2020	Taryn Ries	5	Gabi Brummett	2
2021	Nedya Sawan	12	Sophia Mattice	3
2022	Cally Togiai	6	Cally Togiai	4
2022	Cally Togiai	6	Selma Licina	4
2023	Nedya Sawan	7	Nedya Sawan	4
2023	Nedya Sawan	7	Cally Togiai	4
2024	Hailey Still	7	Isabella Yakel	5

== See also ==
- Women's sports in Portland, Oregon
