= 2010 Saint Louis Athletica season =

Season of football team

Saint Louis Athletica
2010 season
- Stadium: Anheuser-Busch Soccer Park
- WPS: Dissolved
Home colors	Away colors

The 2010 Saint Louis Athletica season was the second and final season for the team, both in Women's Professional Soccer (WPS) and as an organization. On May 27, 2010, WPS announced that Athletica would fold effective immediately, forcing the league to finish the 2010 season with seven teams.

== Background ==
During their inaugural season in 2009, Athletica finished the regular season in second place and third in the playoffs.

=== Offseason ===
In the first WPS expansion draft, Athletica lost two players to the Atlanta Beat. Atlanta used their second pick (fourth overall) on Athletica forward Amanda Cinalli, and their fifth pick (tenth overall) on defender Sara Larsson, who was the only international player to be taken by either team in the draft.

On September 30, when the WPS free agency period began, all teams announced which players they waived or let become free agents, with Athletica waiving/freeing ten players, while resigning or extending contracts for five other players, after exercising options for another four players two days earlier. Athletica release Niki Cross was picked up by FC Gold Pride at the end of October, as were Christie Welsh and Sarah Walsh by the Washington Freedom and Boston Breakers, respectively, in mid-February.

On November 23, Athletica put on their website that they had successfully signed Swedish forward Madelaine Edlund and Brazilian midfielder Elaine, both from Umeå IK, two bring Athletica's confirmed international count for 2010 up to three. They also later re-signed Daniela, for a total of four internationals.

The morning day of the 2010 WPS Draft, Athletica traded young goalkeeper Jillian Loyden to the Chicago Red Stars in exchange for Lindsay Tarpley. Later that day, they drafted UCLA Bruin Kristina Larsen, (second round, 17th overall,) UNC and Pali Blue goalkeeper Ashlyn Harris, (second round, 19th overall,) Santa Clara midfielder Amanda Poach, (third round, 28th overall,) and four other players.

In preparation for the dispersal of the Los Angeles Sol players, Athletica traded Angie Woznuk, Kia McNeill, and rights to Amanda Poach to the Atlanta Beat. In the dispersal draft, Athletica acquired Shannon Boxx, Aya Miyama, Tina DiMartino, and rights to Cathrine Paaske-Sørensen.

== Personnel ==
=== Players ===
Note: Flags indicate national team as defined under FIFA eligibility rules; some limited exceptions apply. Players may hold more than one non-FIFA nationality.

No.	Pos.	Nation	Player
1	GK	USA	Hope Solo
2	MF	BRA	Elaine
3	MF	USA	Carolyn Blank
4	MF	USA	Kendall Fletcher
5	MF	USA	Lindsay Tarpley
6	MF	JPN	Aya Miyama
7	MF	USA	Shannon Boxx
8	DF	USA	Tina Ellertson
9	FW	ENG	Eniola Aluko
10	MF	BRA	Daniela
11	FW	USA	India Trotter
12	DF	USA	Elise Weber

No.	Pos.	Nation	Player
13	MF	USA	Sarah Teegarden
16	MF	USA	Erin Walter
17	MF	USA	Lori Chalupny (captain)
18	GK	USA	Ashlyn Harris
19	FW	SWE	Madelaine Edlund
20	FW	USA	Kristina Larsen
21	DF	USA	Niki Cross
22	DF	USA	Sarah Wagenfuhr
23	MF	USA	Verónica Pérez
25	MF	USA	Tina DiMartino
61	GK	USA	Katie Jo Spisak

==== Transfers ====
In

- Madelaine Edlund (Sweden) From Umeå IK (11/23/09) International Signing
- Elaine (Brazil) From Umeå IK (11/23/09) International Signing
- Lindsay Tarpley (United States) From Chicago Red Stars (1/15/10) Trade
- Shannon Boxx (United States) From Los Angeles Sol (2/4/10) Dispersal Draft
- Aya Miyama (Japan) From Los Angeles Sol (2/4/10) Dispersal Draft
- Tina DiMartino (United States) From Los Angeles Sol (2/4/10) Dispersal Draft
- Niki Cross (United States) From FC Gold Pride (4/1/10) Free Agent

Out

- Amanda Cinalli (United States) To Atlanta Beat (9/15/09) Expansion Draft
- Sara Larsson (Sweden) To Atlanta Beat (9/15/09) Expansion Draft
- Niki Cross (United States) To FC Gold Pride (10/26/09) Free Agent
- Jillian Loyden (United States) To Chicago Red Stars (1/15/10) Trade
- Angie Woznuk (United States) To Atlanta Beat (2/2/10) Trade
- Kia McNeill (United States) To Atlanta Beat (2/2/10) Trade
- Christie Welsh (United States) To Washington Freedom (2/15/10) Free Agent
- Sarah Walsh (Australia) To Boston Breakers (2/22/10) Free Agent

Released

- Ashlee Pistorius (United States)
- Erin Kane (United States)
- Stephanie Logterman (United States)
- Lisa Stoia (United States)
- Melissa Tancredi (Canada)

== Summary ==
=== Preseason ===
Athletica played four games in the 2010 preseason, double that from 2009. Wins against the University of Illinois (4-0) and University of Missouri (3-0) were followed by a 2–1 loss against WPS expansion side Atlanta Beat. Former Athletica player Kia McNeill opened the scoring for the Beat, with Ramona Bachmann (Atlanta) and Shannon Boxx (St. Louis) each adding one later. Athletica finished the preseason with a 3–0 win against a local boys' academy team.

=== Trade: May 5 with New Jersey ===
After losing to the Washington Freedom, Athletica made a defensive-minded trade with Sky Blue FC, sending India Trotter and their first-round pick in the 2011 WPS Draft to the New Jersey team in exchange for English international Anita Asante, rights to former Los Angeles Sol player Nikki Washington, and a second-round pick in the 2011 draft.

The trade was announced on May 4, but controversy and a league review followed. In the 2009 season, Athletica had traded their 2011 first-round draft pick to the Los Angeles Sol, which subsequently had dissolved. Unlike the Sol's players, the Sol's draft picks had not been dispersed to the other teams, so the draft pick's ownership was unknown. The league approved the trade the following day.

Trotter appeared for Sky Blue that weekend, though Asante and Washington were not ready to play for Athletica. To make room for the English international, Athletica waived Brazilian player Daniela.

== Regular season ==
=== Matches ===
April 11, 2010 1	Saint Louis Athletica	2–0	FC Gold Pride	Fenton, Missouri
	Aluko 40' (Boxx), 62' (Boxx); Boxx (yellow card) 55'	Report; Box	Edwards (yellow card) 72'	Stadium: Anheuser-Busch Soccer Park; Attendance: 3,356; Referee: Jennifer Bennett

April 17, 2010 2	Chicago Red Stars	1–1	Saint Louis Athletica	Bridgeview, Illinois
	Nogueira 60' (Chapman)	Report; Box	Chalupny 5'; Elaine (yellow card) 27'; Boxx (yellow card) 73'	Stadium: Toyota Park; Attendance: 5,134; Referee: Kari Seitz

April 25, 2010 3	Saint Louis Athletica	1–1	Boston Breakers	Fenton, Missouri
	Blank 28' (Ellertson)	Report; Box	Moore 22' (Lilly); Cheney (yellow card) 45+'	Stadium: Anheuser-Busch Soccer Park; Attendance: 3,300; Referee: Felisha Mariscal

May 1, 2010 4	Washington Freedom	3–1	Saint Louis Athletica	Washington, D.C.
	Bompastor 20' (Wambach); Sawa 47' (Bompastor); Mykjaland 74' (Wambach)	Box	Aluko 45+1' (Chalupny)	Stadium: RFK Memorial Stadium; Attendance: 8,261; Referee: Kari Seitz

May 8, 2010 5	Saint Louis Athletica	2–1	Philadelphia Independence	Fenton, Missouri
	Falk 41' (o.g.); Tarpley 59'; Boxx (yellow card) 86'	Box	Patterson 74'; Lindsey (yellow card) 89'	Stadium: Anheuser-Busch Soccer Park; Attendance: 3,107; Referee: Jose Carlos Rivero

May 16, 2010 6	Saint Louis Athletica	2–2	Sky Blue FC	Fenton, Missouri
4:00 p.m. CDT	Kalmari 57' (Dallstream), 61' (O'Reilly) (yellow card) 82'	Box score	Boxx 8' (pen.); Aluko (yellow card) 73' (goal) 85' (Boxx)	Stadium: Anheuser-Busch Soccer Park; Attendance: 2,346; Referee: Margaret Domka

May 29, 2010 7	Atlanta Beat	v	Saint Louis Athletica	Kennesaw, Georgia
7:00 p.m. EDT				Stadium: KSU Soccer Stadium

June 5, 2010 8	Boston Breakers	v	Saint Louis Athletica	Cambridge, Massachusetts
6:00 p.m. EDT				Stadium: Harvard Stadium

June 9, 2010 9	Saint Louis Athletica	v	FC Gold Pride	Fenton, Missouri
7:10 p.m. CDT				Stadium: Anheuser-Busch Soccer Park

June 12, 2010 10	Saint Louis Athletica	v	Atlanta Beat	Fenton, Missouri
4:45 p.m. CDT				Stadium: Anheuser-Busch Soccer Park

June 20, 2010 11	Saint Louis Athletica	v	Washington Freedom	Fenton, Missouri
5:00 p.m. CDT				Stadium: Anheuser-Busch Soccer Park

June 27, 2010 12	FC Gold Pride	v	Saint Louis Athletica	Hayward, California
3:00 p.m. PDT				Stadium: Pioneer Stadium

July 7, 2010 13	Sky Blue FC	v	Saint Louis Athletica	Piscataway, New Jersey
7:00 p.m. EDT				Stadium: Yurcak Field

July 10, 2010 14	Washington Freedom	v	Saint Louis Athletica	Boyds, Maryland
7:00 p.m. EDT				Stadium: Maryland SoccerPlex

July 18, 2010 15	Saint Louis Athletica	v	Chicago Red Stars	Fenton, Missouri
7:10 p.m. CDT				Stadium: Anheuser-Busch Soccer Park

July 24, 2010 16	Saint Louis Athletica	v	Atlanta Beat	Fenton, Missouri
7:10 p.m. CDT				Stadium: Anheuser-Busch Soccer Park

July 28, 2010 17	Sky Blue FC	v	Saint Louis Athletica	Piscataway, New Jersey
7:00 p.m. EDT				Stadium: Yurcak Field

August 8, 2010 18	Philadelphia Independence	v	Saint Louis Athletica	West Chester, Pennsylvania
7:30 p.m. EDT				Stadium: John A. Farrell Stadium

August 11, 2010 19	Saint Louis Athletica	v	Boston Breakers	Fenton, Missouri
7:10 p.m. CDT				Stadium: Anheuser-Busch Soccer Park

August 14, 2010 20	Atlanta Beat	v	Saint Louis Athletica	Kennesaw, Georgia
7:00 p.m. EDT				Stadium: KSU Soccer Stadium

August 22, 2010 21	Saint Louis Athletica	v	Washington Freedom	Fenton, Missouri
3:00 p.m. CDT				Stadium: Anheuser-Busch Soccer Park

August 28, 2010 22	Saint Louis Athletica	v	Chicago Red Stars	Fenton, Missouri
7:10 p.m. CDT				Stadium: Anheuser-Busch Soccer Park

September 5, 2010 23	Philadelphia Independence	v	Saint Louis Athletica	West Chester, Pennsylvania
6:00 p.m. EDT				Stadium: John A. Farrell Stadium

September 11, 2010 24	Chicago Red Stars	v	Saint Louis Athletica	Bridgeview, Illinois
6:00 p.m. CDT				Stadium: Toyota Park

=== Standings ===
Pos	Team	Pld	W	D	L	GF	GA	GD	Pts	Qualification
1	FC Gold Pride	24	16	5	3	46	19	+27	53	Advance to Championship
2	Boston Breakers	24	10	6	8	36	28	+8	36	Advance to Super Semifinal
3	Philadelphia Independence	24	10	4	10	37	36	+1	34	Advance to First Round
4	Washington Freedom	24	8	7	9	33	33	0	31	Advance to First Round
5	Sky Blue FC	24	7	7	10	20	31	−11	28	
6	Chicago Red Stars	24	7	6	11	21	27	−6	27	
7	Atlanta Beat	24	5	6	13	20	40	−20	21	
8	Saint Louis Athletica	6	2	3	1	9	8	+1	9	Team withdrawn

Source: WPS Soccerway
Rules for classification: 1) points, 2) goal difference, 3) head-to-head result.

=== Results by match ===
Matchday	1	2	3	4	5	6	7	8	9	10	11	12	13	14	15	16	17	18	19	20	21	22	23	24
Stadium	H	A	H	A	H	H	A	A	H	H	H	A	A	A	H	H	A	A	H	A	H	H	A	A
Result	W	D	D	L	W	D	V	V	V	V	V	V	V	V	V	V	V	V	V	V	V	V	V	V

Updated to match(es) played on May 8, 2010. Source: NWSL
A = Away; H = Home; W = Win; D = Draw; L = Loss; V = Void due to dissolution

== Dissolution and dispersal ==
Saint Louis Athletica folded on May 27, 2010, and its sibling men's club A.C. St. Louis folded in January 2011. Spokesman Jeff Cooper announced the closure, precipitated when investors Sanjeev and Heemal Vaid defaulted on a funding contract. Its players were made free agents effective June 1.

Saint Louis Athletica free agent dispersal
Date	Pos.	Nat.	Player	Destination team
June 3, 2010	FW	(England) ENG	Eniola Aluko	Atlanta Beat
June 3, 2010	MF	(United States) USA	Carolyn Blank	Atlanta Beat (Note: Signed to developmental player roster.) (Note: Elevated from developmental roster to full team on July 1.)
June 3, 2010	FW	(United States) USA	Lori Chalupny	Atlanta Beat
June 3, 2010	DF	(United States) USA	Tina Ellertson	Atlanta Beat
June 3, 2010	GK	(United States) USA	Hope Solo	Atlanta Beat
June 3, 2010	MF	(United States) USA	Shannon Boxx	FC Gold Pride
June 4, 2010	MF	(United States) USA	Nikki Washington	Chicago Red Stars
June 4, 2010	DF	(United States) USA	Elise Weber	Chicago Red Stars
June 7, 2010	FW	(United States) USA	Lindsay Tarpley	Boston Breakers
June 7, 2010	MF	(United States) USA	Tina DiMartino	Philadelphia Independence
June 9, 2010	DF	(England) ENG	Anita Asante	Chicago Red Stars
June 9, 2010	GK	(United States) USA	Ashlyn Harris	Washington Freedom
June 10, 2010	MF	(Japan) JPN	Aya Miyama	Atlanta Beat
June 10, 2010	DF	(United States) USA	Kendall Fletcher	Sky Blue FC (Note: Elevated from developmental roster to full team on July 7.)
June 11, 2010	MF	(United States) USA	Niki Cross	Boston Breakers
June 21, 2010	MF	(Brazil) BRA	Elaine	Tyresö FF
