= 2009 Saint Louis Athletica season =

Saint Louis Athletica
2009 season
- Chairman: Jeff Cooper
- Manager: Jorge Barcellos
- Women's Professional Soccer: 2nd
- WPS Playoffs: semifinal (3rd)
- Top goalscorer: Eniola Aluko (6)
Home colours	Away colours

The 2009 Saint Louis Athletica season was the inaugural season for the team (as part of the inaugural season for Women's Professional Soccer).

== Off-season ==
On August 26, 2008, it was announced that the Saint Louis' head coach would be Jorge Barcellos, the then-head coach of the Brazilian women's team. Team Chairman Jeff Cooper's organization SLSU has plans for a soccer-specific stadium ready, but the construction will not start until St. Louis is also awarded an MLS franchise.

On September 11, 2008, "St. Louis" was revealed as the official team name through an online video, along with a new team crest. The name and crest were further updated on November 25 unveiling "Saint Louis Athletica" as the new name.

On 16 September 2008, the initial WPS player allocation was conducted; US Women's National Team players Hope Solo, Lori Chalupny and Tina Ellertson were allocated to St. Louis.

On 24 September 2008, the 2008 WPS International Draft was conducted; Brazilians Daniela and Renata Costa, Swedish striker Lotta Schelin and Canadian Melissa Tancredi also were allocated to St. Louis. Eniola Aluko of England and Ingvild Stensland of Norway were named as post-draft discovery players in the following two days.

On 6 October 2008, the 2008 WPS General Draft took place. St. Louis drafted players India Trotter, Angie Woznuk, Joanna Lohman and Amanda Cinalli.

On 17 November 2008, St. Louis renounced its right to negotiate with Stensland, naming Brazilian Francielle as the next post-draft discovery player. Two days later, St. Louis also renounced its negotiation rights to Schelin, naming fellow Swede Sara Larsson in her stead.

Trotter signed a two-year contract with FFC Frankfurt in July 2008 and thus most likely will not be coming. On the positive side, both Larsson and Aluko have expressed a large interest in Athletica, and have made statements suggesting that they will be coming, despite no contracts officially being announced as of early January 2009.

On January 16, at the 2009 NSCAA convention held in St. Louis, the Athletica drafted Notre Dame forward Kerri Hanks, (first round, sixth overall,) Boston College alumnus Kia McNeill, (second round, ninth overall,) University of Texas at Austin defender Stephanie Logterman, (third round, twentieth overall,) Notre Dame defender Elise Weber, (trade* with Washington to be twenty-first,) UConn defender Niki Cross, (fifth round, thirty-fourth,) Villanova goalkeeper Jillian Loyden, (sixth round, thirty-seventh,) West Virginia University midfielder Lisa Stoia, (seventh round, forty-eighth,) Florida forward Megan Kerns, (eighth round, fifty-first,) Penn State defender/midfielder Sheree Gray, (ninth round, sixty-second,) and Clemson midfielder/forward Lydia Vandenbergh (tenth round, sixty-fifth). *The Athletica traded away Joanna Lohman and their 23rd overall pick to get the 21st pick.

On January 21, it was announced that Renata Costa had signed with Swedish club LdB FC instead of the Athletica.

On March 3, Athletica's initial preseason roster was released, along with those of all WPS teams, having 35 players listed. On March 12, Athletica released nine of those players, including draftee Megan Kerns. Post-Dispatch writer Tom Timmermann posted a slightly short list (down to twenty-four players) on March 16.

== Personnel ==
=== Players ===
Note: Flags indicate national team as defined under FIFA eligibility rules; some limited exceptions apply. Players may hold more than one non-FIFA nationality.

No.	Pos.	Nation	Player
1	GK	USA	Hope Solo
3	DF	USA	Stephanie Logterman
4	DF	SWE	Sara Larsson
5	DF	USA	Sheree Gray
6	DF	USA	Kia McNeill
7	MF	USA	Lisa Stoia
8	FW	USA	Tina Ellertson
9	FW	ENG	Eniola Aluko
10	MF	BRA	Daniela
11	FW	USA	Angie Woznuk
12	DF	USA	Elise Weber

No.	Pos.	Nation	Player
13	GK	USA	Jillian Loyden
14	FW	CAN	Melissa Tancredi
15	FW	USA	Ashlee Pistorius
16	MF	USA	Erin Walter
17	MF	USA	Lori Chalupny (captain)
19	DF	USA	Niki Cross
20	FW	USA	Amanda Cinalli
21	FW	AUS	Sarah Walsh
22	GK	USA	Erin Kane
23	FW	USA	Christie Welsh
24	DF	USA	Kendall Fletcher

==== Transfers ====
- IN: Christie Welsh (United States) From Los Angeles Sol (5/8/09)
- IN: Kendall Fletcher (United States) From Los Angeles Sol (5/8/09)
- OUT: Lydia Vandenburgh (United States) Released (5/14/09)
- IN: Sarah Walsh (Australia) From Sky Blue FC (6/26/09)
- OUT: Francielle (Brazil) To Sky Blue FC (6/26/09)
- OUT: Kerri Hanks (United States) To Sky Blue FC (6/26/09)

== Preseason ==
Athletica only played two preseason games, less than any other WPS team, and didn't play any other WPS team in those games. Athletica convincingly won both games, though: 7-2 versus the University of Missouri and 3-1 versus Notre Dame. Both games were closed to the public.

== Regular season ==
Overall Record: 10 - 6 - 4 • 34 pts. • 2nd/7 GF:19 - GA:15 • GD:+4
Match	1	2	3	4	5	6	7	8	9	10	11	12	13	14	15	16	17	18	19	20
Date	4/4	4/11	4/25	5/3	5/9	5/23	5/30	6/7	6/14	6/20	6/24	6/28	7/5	7/8	7/18	7/22	7/26	8/1	8/5	8/9
Opponent	CHI	BOS	LA	WSH	BAY	CHI	LA	NJ	BOS	WSH	LA	NJ	BAY	LA	WSH	NJ	BAY	BOS	CHI	BAY
H/A?	H	A	H	A	H	A	A	H	A	H	H	A	A	A	A	H	H	H	H	A
Result	0-1	0-2	0-0	3-3	1-0	2-0	0-2	1-0	1-0	0-1	1-2	2-1	1-0	1-0	0-1	1-0	1-1	1-0	2-0	1-1

Scores are posted as STL-opponent
A note on home games: Game 1 was played at Ralph Korte Stadium at SIUE, game 3 was played at Robert R. Hermann Stadium at SLU, game 5 was back at Korte Stadium, and the remaining home games take place at Anheuser-Busch Soccer Park.

Athletica got off to a very slow start, being the only team with no points after the first two games and winless after the first four, despite usually outplaying their opponents; Athletica was in last place or tied for last place in the league for the first two months of the season. In the fourth game, Athletica lost what was assumed to be their star player, Brazilian Daniela, to a season-ending injury, and this combined with the slow start made many people write Athletica off. However, Athletica went 10-4-2 the rest of the season, even better than the eventual season champions Los Angeles Sol during that same time period. With solid play from USWNT players Lori Chalupny, Hope Solo, and Tina Ellertson, and breakout scoring force from English international Eniola Aluko, Athletica fought back to clinch second place in the league two games before their season was over, only losing to two teams (Los Angeles and the Washington Freedom) for the rest of the season.

=== Game 1: April 4 vs Chicago ===
April 4, 2009
7:00 PM CDT

Saint Louis Athletica	0 - 1	Chicago Red Stars
		Lindsay Tarpley 78'; Nikki Krzysik (yellow card) 90'

Ralph Korte Stadium, Edwardsville, IL
Attendance: 5,008
Referee: Margaret Domka

In the home opener on April 4, Athletica controlled the first half well, but faltered in the second half and could not score. Despite outshooting their opponents the Chicago Red Stars by 15–7, they lost the game 0–1 on a 78th-minute goal by Lindsay Tarpley.

=== Game 2: April 11 at Boston ===
April 11, 2009

Boston Breakers	2 - 0	Saint Louis Athletica
Kelly Smith 53'; Kasey Moore (yellow card) 57'; Alex Scott (yellow card) 79'; Kristine Lilly 87'; Stacy Bishop (yellow card) 91'		Melissa Tancredi (yellow card) 67'

Harvard Stadium, Cambridge, MA
Attendance: 4,804
Referee: Sandra Serafini

Athletica repeated their home opener performance in their first away game at the Boston Breakers on April 11: Boston was outshot 14-7 but put two goals past Hope Solo while shutting out Athletica. So, after every team had played their first two games, Athletica was left at the bottom of the table as the only team without a point.

=== Game 3: April 25 vs Los Angeles ===
April 25, 2009
1:00 PM CDT

Saint Louis Athletica	0 - 0	Los Angeles Sol
Kia McNeill (yellow card) 42'; Daniela (yellow card) 45'		Aya Miyama (yellow card) 55'; Stephanie Cox (yellow card) 85'

Robert R. Hermann Stadium, St. Louis, MO
Attendance: 4,228
Referee: Juan Carlos Rivero

On April 26, in their only home game at SLU, Athletica held the Los Angeles Sol to a 0–0 draw in dramatic fashion as both goalkeepers (Solo and Karina LeBlanc) made incredible saves throughout the game, including a penalty kick each. Athletica was the first team to hold the top-ranked Sol to no goals, though still could not find the back of the net themselves, despite once again well outshooting their opponent 18–7.

=== Game 4: May 3 at Washington ===
May 3, 2009

Washington Freedom	3 - 3	Saint Louis Athletica
Sonia Bompastor 29' 90'; Lisa De Vanna 79'; Abby Wambach (yellow card) 81'		Daniela 7' 41'; Kia McNeill (yellow card) 39'; Eniola Aluko 69'; Elise Weber (yellow card) 92+'

Maryland SoccerPlex, Germantown, Maryland
Attendance: 5,149
Referee: Shane Butler

Athletica finally got on the scoreboard in a highly physical match against the Washington Freedom. In the first match where they did not highly outshoot their opponent (in fact, were beat in shots 15–28) Athletica scored three goals, the first two by solo work from Daniela. Despite leading 3–1 by the middle of the second half, though, Athletica let in two more goals to only come away from the game with a tie after both Daniela and Tina Ellertson were injured within five minutes of each other. Daniela was also sidelined indefinitely, potentially for the rest of the season, after a tackle from Abby Wambach on the rain-wet field gave her "two injured knee ligaments and a crack in her tibia." Kia McNeill was later given a one-game suspension for overly physical play.

=== Trade: May 8 w/ Los Angeles ===
After the first game against Washington Freedom which ultimately resulted in Athletica losing two starters (Daniela and Kia McNeill) in addition to those already out for injury, Athletica made the first trade in WPS by giving the Los Angeles Sol two draft picks in exchange for Christie Welsh and Kendall Fletcher. Sheree Gray was also cut from the roster, though was later re-added as a developmental player while Lydia Vandenbergh was waived.

=== Game 5: May 9 vs Bay Area ===
May 9, 2009
5:00 PM CDT

Saint Louis Athletica	1 - 0	FC Gold Pride
Lori Chalupny 16'; Elise Weber (yellow card) 94+'		Tiffeny Milbrett (yellow card) 56'

Ralph Korte Stadium, Edwardsville, IL
Attendance: 3,860
Referee: Dallas Malhiwsky

A week after scoring their first goals, Athletia notched their first win of the season in a 1-0 match against FC Gold Pride at home. After an early flurry near the Gold Pride net (which included 'keeper Nicole Barnhart getting a fractured nose in a collision) Chalupny took a corner kick for Athletica and scored directly with a curving ball into the far top corner of the net. Gold Pride dominated the second half, though, especially with Melissa Tancredi subbing out due to injury, but Solo kept the clean sheet with several spectacular saves to preserve Athletica's first win. Chalupny was later named Player of the Week for her goal and all-around performance.

=== Game 6: May 23 at Chicago ===
May 23, 2009

Chicago Red Stars	0 - 2	Saint Louis Athletica
Chioma Igwe (yellow card) 9'		Ifeoma Dieke 26' (o.g.); Eniola Aluko 41' (yellow card) 81'

Toyota Park, Bridgeview, IL
Attendance: 4,461
Referee: Sandra Serafini

Despite coming off of a bye week and missing multiple starters due to injury, suspension, and national team duty, Athletica avenged their home opener with a 2–0 victory over the Red Stars. Chicago's Ifeoma Dieke notched WPS's first (official) own goal to put Athletica up 1–0. Athletica the got on the board without help from Chicago before the first half ended on a goal by Eniola Aluko, assisted by Kendall Fletcher, one of the two players Athletica got from a trade with Los Angeles. The Red Stars dominated the second half, but backup 'keeper Jillian Loyden preserved the clean sheet and the win. Loyden was also named Player of the Week, the first goalkeeper to do so in WPS.

=== Game 7: May 30 at Los Angeles ===
In their second rematch of the season, Athletic played the Los Angeles Sol, this time at the Home Depot Center. Athletica lost 0–2, ending Athletica's four-game unbeaten streak. The Sol's scorers were Camille Abily assisted by Marta in the first half and Shannon Boxx assisted by Han Duan in the second. After the match, both coach Barcellos and captain Chalupny commented on Athletica not getting things together as a team, messing up many passes.

=== Game 8: June 7 vs New Jersey ===
Athletica's eighth match of the season was their first match against Sky Blue FC. In their opening game at AB Soccer Park, Athletica blanked Sky Blue 1–0 on a 15th-minute goal by Amanda Cinalli. It was Cinalli's first match and start, as it was for Stephanie Logterman, who also contributed greatly to the match. Though Sky Blue had more shots in the match and was the more dangerous team during the second half, Solo and the Athletica back line preserved the shoutout for Athletica's third win. The three points propelled Athletica into the playoff picture for the first time in the season, as a three-way tie between Saint Louis, Boston, and the Bay Area for third place slotted Athletica in fourth place overall by tiebreakers.

=== Game 9: June 14 at Boston ===
Athletica continued to climb the WPS standings with a 1–0 win over the Breakers in their second trip to Harvard Stadium, leapfrogging into second place. The winning goal was scored by Aluko, her third in the past four games, just before halftime. Twice earlier in the first half it looked like Athletica had also scored, but the first was called offside and the second made the side netting. Boston outshot Saint Louis 4–2, and had eight corner kicks to Athletica's one, but could not find the equalizer. The win means Athletica has climbed the standings from sixth to second place in just two weeks, and has won four of its last five games, the only loss being to league-leaders Los Angeles.

=== Game 10: June 20 vs Washington ===
Athletica dropped their home rematch with the Freedom 0–1. The heat and humidity may have accounted for the first-half early substitutions for a player on each sides. Athletica played the better game for the most part, forcing Freedom 'keeper Erin McLeod to make seven saves, but never getting past her or the crossbar, which was hit on at least three occasions. The game's only goal came from Rebecca Moros in the 81st minute, as her shot bounced off Athletica's crossbar and went straight down.

=== Game 11: June 24 vs Los Angeles ===
Athletica returned to their early season form in their third match against the Los Angeles Sol, highly outplaying the visitors at Soccer Park, but ending the game with a 1–2 loss. Athletica had twice the number of shots (25–12) and shots on goal (10–6), as well as six times as many corners (12–2), but were repeatedly stymied. LeBlanc made save after save throughout the game, totaling eight overall, and even though a rolling ball got past her on at least two occasions, the Sol's defense managed to hold Athletica at bay. "We missed the goal almost from inside the goal" said Athletica Coach Barcellos. Both coaches agreed the Sol capitalized on the only two chances at goal they ever really had, with Han Duan scoring in the 50th minute and Marta doubling LA's lead in the 73rd. Kerri Hanks scored the lone Athletica goal, her first of the season, in the 77th minute from a pass by Aluko.

=== Trade: June 26 w/ New Jersey ===
In a move to trim the roster back down to regular size, Athletica announced a trade with Sky Blue FC on June 26, 2009. Kerri Hanks, Francielle, and rights to Renata Costa were traded for Sarah Walsh, rights to Ester, and a conditional draft pick. This is the second major trade in the league this season, both trades involving Athletica.

=== Game 12: June 28 at New Jersey ===
The first game of Athletica's longest away stretch at Sky Blue FC, ended with a 2–1 win for the Athletica, propelling them back into third place in the standings. Athletica was outplayed, only getting two shots on goal and no corners to eight and seven respectively, but Athletica converted both chances it had, and Solo only missed a 76' shot by Julianne Sitch, meaning Aluko's second-minute goal and an unlikely volley from Elise Weber in 84' sealed the victory.

=== Game 13: July 5 at Bay Area ===
In the second of four away games, and the second of four games against FC Gold Pride, Chalupny scored her second goal of the season, the only goal in Athletica's second away win and second win over the northern California team. Athletica dominated the first half with multiple close chances. Chalupny nailed the game-winner in from distance in the 73rd minute.

=== Game 14: July 8 at Los Angeles ===
Athletica faced the league-leading Sol for the Sol's final home game of the season and last meeting between the two teams. The Sol, on an 11-game unbeaten streak and able to clinch first place with a win, were shocked by a 1-0 decision in Athletica's favor, thanks to an 11th-minute goal by Cinalli (assisted by Aluko). "Not on our watch" said defender Tina Ellertson. The Los Angeles side had more shots and more corner kicks, but Athletica had more shots on goal. Solo made four very impressive saves in keeping the shutout.

=== Game 15: July 18 at Washington ===
Athletica could not finish the four-game away run perfectly, dropping their last match against the Freedom 0-1 from a late goal by Homare Sawa in the 74th minute. Both teams were missing multiple players due to international friendlies; Athletica saw a very different lineup, where defender Niki Cross starting as a forward, and recent acquisition Sarah Walsh subbing in during the second half. After an exciting first fifteen minutes which saw both teams make several close calls on the goal, both teams seemed to lose all energy. The incredibly tight Freedom backline kept the ball in Athletica's half for most of the game, meaning that neither the Freedom's backup keepers (Katie Jo Spisak was replaced by their goalkeeping coach (under a one-game contract) in the second half) were tested much at all. Loyden was not tested much either, but a deflection on Sawa's kick sent the ball closer to the near post than anticipated, giving the Freedom the win.

=== Game 16: July 22 vs New Jersey ===
In their first match at home in a month, Athletica finished their sweep of Sky Blue FC with a 1–0 win. Even though Sky Blue slightly outshot Athletica, Athletica controlled the game very well. Aluko notched the game's only goal in the 48th minute, and Loyden earned her second shutout with seven saves, including one very impressive one-on-one against Natasha Kai, to preserve the win.

=== Game 17: July 26 vs Bay Area ===
Athletica tied FC Gold Pride 1–1 at Soccer Park in Athletica's only FSC-televised game of the season. Cross notched her first goal of the season from a cross by Fletcher to put Athletica up 1–0 in the 28th minute. The high-energy game saw many chances from both teams throughout both halves, with the intensity increasing even more in the last fifteen minutes. Ultimately, Gold Pride prevented Athletica from clinching a playoff spot when Christine Sinclair put one past Solo in the 88th minute. Without the three points, though, Gold Pride was eliminated from playoff contention.

=== Game 18: August 1 vs Boston ===
Athletica beat the Boston Breakers 1–0 in their third of four final home games. With good chances on goal from both teams in the first half, the difference came when a cross from Cinalli made it past several Breakers defenders, allowing Aluko to slip a shot directly between the legs of Breakers 'keeper Allison Lipsher. Walsh almost made it 2–0 in the second half, but her arcing shot from distance hit the far post at just the wrong angle and traced the back edgeline back out of the box, where a defender cleared it. Still, with the win, Athletica clinched second place for the season, and have thus guaranteed hosting the Super Semifinal.

=== Game 19: August 5 vs Chicago ===
In their last home game of the season, Athletica handed the Chicago Red Stars another 2–0 defeat. Both goals, 35' and 65', were scored by Welsh aided by Walsh, with Walsh getting the assist on the first goal and starting the play that caused the second (Tancredi assisted that one). The win was made even more impressive by the fact of how much coach Jorge Barcellos rested the regular starters: Chalupny came off at halftime, Walsh came off in the 73rd minute, and Aluko, Cross, and Cinalli stayed on the bench for the whole game. The scoring combination of Walsh/Welsh made the strong implication that they would replace the offensive hole made my Aluko leaving for Europe during the playoffs.

=== Game 20: August 9 vs Bay Area ===
Athltica finished their inaugural season on August 9 with another 1–1 draw at FC Gold Pride. Athletica's goal was scored in the 18th minute by Welsh, with the assist surprisingly coming from Solo. It was her first assist of the year as well as the first ever assist by a goalie in WPS. Gold Pride equalized in the 24th minute when Rachel Buehler ran unchecked into a 1–1 with Solo. Gold Pride had the better of play for most of the remainder of the match, though after Aluko subbed in for Walsh in the 88th, she sent several shots at Barnhart, almost scoring the winning goal several times. All in all, Athletica's defense was a little worse than it should have been, allowing 11 shots on goal.

== Postseason ==
=== Playoffs ===
First Round
3	Washington Freedom	1
4	Sky Blue FC	2

Super Semifinal
2	Saint Louis Athletica	0
4	Sky Blue FC	1

WPS Final
1	Los Angeles Sol	0
4	Sky Blue FC	1

Super Semifinal

August 19, 2009
6:00 PM CDT

Saint Louis Athletica	0 - 1	Sky Blue FC
Stephanie Logterman (yellow card) 90+'		Keeley Dowling 30'; Meghan Schnur (yellow card) 67'; Natasha Kai (yellow card) 78'

Soccer Park, Fenton, MO
Attendance: 5064
Referee: Ted Unkel

A late flurry from the Athletica was not enough to come back from the 0–1 deficit from the first half. Aside from several spectacular saves from Solo, Athletica did not show up well in the first half, which let Sky Blue control enough to score once. Athletica controlled the second half well, taking many shots as the final whistle neared, but none made it past NJ keeper Jenni Branam. With the result, Sky Blue continued its improbable playoff run to the final while Athletica was left to prepare for the expansion draft and next season.

=== All-star game ===
The Saint Louis Athletica were chosen to host the 2009 All-Star game on June 25 by WPS. The game itself took place on August 30, with the WPS All-Stars playing Swedish champion Umeå IK. Athletica had four players selected for the All-Star game: Lori Chalupny, Eniola Aluko, and Tina Ellertson made the Starting XI, and Hope Solo was chosen as an "At-Large" player selection by All-Star coach Abner Rogers and WPS Commissioner Tonya Antonucci.

2009-08-30
16:30 CDT

WPS All-Stars (United States)	4 - 2	(Sweden) Umeå IK
Lilly 24'; Marta 40'; Cristiane (yellow card) 45+'; Sinclair 47' 49'	Boxscore	Edlund 2'; Jacobsson 16'; Elaine (yellow card) 57'

Soccer Park, Fenton, Missouri
Attendance: 4,115
Referee: Sandra Serafini (USA)

Chalupny played for the entire game, while Ellertson played first half as one of the Starting XI and Solo was subbed in (for Karina LeBlanc) at halftime. Solo kept a shutout during her half, which in addition to Sinclair's goals, secured the win over the Swedish champions.
