= 2011 Atlanta Beat season =

Atlanta Beat
2011 season
- Owner: Fitz Johnson
- Head coach: James Galanis
- Stadium: KSU Soccer Stadium
- WPS: 6th
- Playoffs: Did not qualify
- National Women's Cup: Did not enter
- Top goalscorer: Three players (2 goals)
- Highest home attendance: 9,345 (Jul 23 vs. magicJack)
- Lowest home attendance: 3,075 (Apr 24 vs. WNY)
- Average home league attendance: 4,840
Home colors	Away colors

The 2011 Atlanta Beat season was the club's second season in Women's Professional Soccer (WPS) and their second consecutive season in the top division of women's soccer in the United States. Including the Women's United Soccer Association franchise, it was the club's sixth year of existence. It was also the club's final year of existence, with WPS folding before the beginning of the 2012 season

== Review and events ==
Prior to the beginning of the 2011 WPS season, the Atlanta Beat organization scheduled several preseason friendlies against local universities. For the preseason, the Beat played Auburn University twice, and then University of North Carolina, Georgia and Florida State. In preseason, the Beat went on an undefeated 5-0-0 run, and only conceded one goal in the process.

On April 9, in front of more than 4,000 spectators, the Beat opened their season with a 1–4 loss to the Boston Breakers.

== Match results ==
=== Preseason ===
March 9, 2011	Auburn Tigers	0–1	Atlanta Beat	Auburn, Alabama
16:00 EDT		Scoreline; AUB report	Chalupny	Stadium: Auburn Soccer Complex

March 19, 2011	Atlanta Beat	2–0	UNC Tar Heels	Kennesaw, Georgia
16:00 EDT	Lenczyk 16' (Larsen); Jesolva 80' (Larsen)	Scoreline; ATL report		Stadium: KSU Soccer Stadium

March 20, 2011	Atlanta Beat	1–0	Florida State Seminoles	Columbus, Georgia
	Larsen	Scoreline; ATL report FSU report		Stadium: Walden Soccer Complex

March 27, 2011	Florida Gators	2–0	Atlanta Beat	Kennesaw, Georgia
17:00 EDT	Chalupny (?)	Scoreline; Report		Stadium: KSU Soccer Stadium

March 29, 2011	Georgia Bulldogs	1–2	Atlanta Beat	Athens, Georgia
17:30 EDT	Miller 15'	Scoreline; UGA report	Chalupny 45+1', 60'	Stadium: Turner Soccer Complex

April 3, 2011	Auburn Tigers	0–4	Atlanta Beat	Hoover, Alabama
17:30 EDT		Scoreline		Stadium: Spain Park HS Stadium

=== WPS ===
April 9, 2011 1	Atlanta Beat	1–4	Boston Breakers	Kennesaw, GA
7:30 p.m. EST (UTC-05:00)	Lloyd 78' (pen.)	Report	18' Angeli; 23' Winters; 72' O'Hara; 90+' Moore	Stadium: KSU Soccer Stadium; Attendance: 4,002; Referee: Ted Unkel; Assistant referees: Mark Buda, Amy Mahan; Fourth official: Patrick Baker

April 16, 2011 2	Atlanta Beat	1–0	Sky Blue FC	Kennesaw, GA
	Lencyzk 51'	Report		Stadium: KSU Soccer Stadium; Attendance: 3,380

April 24, 2011 3	Atlanta Beat	2–2	Western New York Flash	Kennesaw, GA
	Chalupny 58'; Lloyd 70'	Report	3' Sinclair; 67' Marta	Stadium: KSU Soccer Stadium; Attendance: 3,075

May 1, 2011 4	Western New York Flash	3–0	Atlanta Beat	Rochester, NY
	Sinclair 23', 59'; Morgan 73'	Report		Stadium: Sahlen's Stadium; Attendance: 2,164; Referee: Ted Unkel; Assistant referees: Ashley Cedro, Molly Cunningham; Fourth official: Steve Montagnino

May 8, 2011 5	magicJack	2–0	Atlanta Beat	Boca Raton, FL
	Masar 24'; Press 64'	Report		Stadium: FAU Soccer Stadium; Attendance: 952; Referee: Stephanie Toth; Assistant referees: Miguel Panduro, Kristen Schiereck; Fourth official: Carlos Sandoval

May 15, 2011 6	Atlanta Beat	1–2	Philadelphia Independence	Kennesaw, GA
	Chalupny 45+'	Report	50' Johnson; 73' del Rio	Stadium: KSU Soccer Stadium; Attendance: 6,125; Referee: Ted Unkel; Assistant referees: Amy Mahan, Justin Brown; Fourth official: Veronica Brito

May 21, 2011 7	Sky Blue FC	3–0	Atlanta Beat	Piscataway, NJ
		Report		Stadium: Yurcak Field; Attendance: 2,947; Referee: Margaret Domka; Assistant referees: Juliana Duncan, Robert Sibiga; Fourth official: Albert Calise

May 28, 2011 8	magicJack	4–0	Atlanta Beat	Boca Raton, FL
		Report		Stadium: FAU Soccer Stadium; Attendance: 864; Referee: Veronica Brito; Assistant referees: Shelley Finger, Carlos Sandoval; Fourth official: Ingrid Burd

June 4, 2011 9	Philadelphia Independence	0–0	Atlanta Beat	Chester, PA
		Report		Stadium: Leslie Quick Stadium; Attendance: 2,127; Referee: Margaret Domka; Assistant referees: Angela Ianni, Eric Weisbrod; Fourth official: Kevin Klinger

June 11, 2011 10	Atlanta Beat	2–3	magicJack	Kennesaw, GA
		Report		Stadium: KSU Soccer Stadium; Attendance: 3,124; Referee: Stephanie Toth; Assistant referees: Melanie Johnson, Justin Brown; Fourth official: Talha Dikgitmetz

June 19, 2011 11	Atlanta Beat	0–0	Boston Breakers	Kennesaw, GA
		Report		Stadium: KSU Soccer Stadium; Attendance: 3,654; Referee: Christina Ibanez; Assistant referees: Amy Mahan, David Jaye; Fourth official: Mark Asauro

June 22, 2011 12	Sky Blue FC	1–0	Atlanta Beat	Piscataway, NJ
		Report		Stadium: Yurcak Field; Attendance: 1,145; Referee: Veronica Brito; Assistant referees: Robert Sibiga, Katja Koroleva; Fourth official: Yevgeniy Mednikov

July 10, 2011 13	Boston Breakers	2–0	Atlanta Beat	Cambridge, MA
		Report		Stadium: Harvard Stadium; Attendance: 2,749; Referee: Margaret Domka; Assistant referees: Ashley Cedro, Russell Wolf; Fourth official: Scott Kachmarik

2011 14	Atlanta Beat	0–1	Philadelphia Independence	Kennesaw, GA
		Report		Stadium: KSU Soccer Stadium; Attendance: 3,742; Referee: Patrick Baker; Assistant referees: Talha Dikgitmetz, Mark Cleland; Fourth official: Mark Asauro

July 23, 2011 15	Atlanta Beat	0–0	magicJack	Kennesaw, GA
		Report		Stadium: KSU Soccer Stadium; Attendance: 9,345; Referee: Felisha Mariscal; Assistant referees: Veronica Brito, Melanie Johnson; Fourth official: David Jaye

July 31, 2011 16	Philadelphia Independence	1–0	Atlanta Beat	Chester, PA
		Report		Stadium: Leslie Quick Stadium; Attendance: 4,126; Referee: Christina Ibanez

August 6, 2011 17	Atlanta Beat	0–2	Western New York Flash	Kennesaw, GA
		Report		Stadium: KSU Soccer Stadium; Attendance: 7,112

August 14, 2011 18	Western New York Flash	2–0	Atlanta Beat	Rochester, NY
		Report		Stadium: Sahlen's Stadium; Attendance: 5,702; Referee: Moo Hackett; Assistant referees: Veronica Perez, Molly Cunningham; Fourth official: Ashley Cedro

== Club ==
=== Roster ===
Note: Flags indicate national team as defined under FIFA eligibility rules; some limited exceptions apply. Players may hold more than one non-FIFA nationality.

No.	Pos.	Nation	Player
—	DF	USA	Katherine Reynolds
—	MF	USA	India Trotter
—	MF	USA	Lori Chalupny
—	DF	USA	Keeley Dowling
—	DF	USA	Cat Whitehill
—	DF	USA	Heather Mitts
—	DF	USA	Kia McNeill
—	FW	CAN	Lauren Sesselmann
—	MF	USA	Carli Lloyd
—	GK	USA	Allison Lipsher
—	MF	USA	Angela Salem
—	MF	USA	Colleen Flanagan
—	DF	USA	Megan Jesolva

No.	Pos.	Nation	Player
—	MF	USA	Julianne Sitch
—	FW	USA	Meghan Lenczyk
—	MF	USA	Kacey White
—	MF	USA	Kylie Wright
—	GK	USA	Katie Fraine
—	FW	USA	Katie Bethke
—	GK	USA	Allison Whitworth
—	FW	USA	Analisa Marquez
—	MF	CAN	Kelly Parker
—	MF	USA	Lyndsey Patterson
—	MF	USA	Bianca D'Agostino

=== Management and staff ===
Front Office

Position	Staff
Owner & Chief Executive Officer	(United States) T. Fitz Johnson
Asst. General Manager	(United States) Kristin Lettiere
Director of Crowd Building	(United States) Scott Foster
Ticket Operations	(United States) Jennifer Morehead
Corporate Manager	(United States) Sherry King-Castellanos
Community Manager	(United States) Amanda Hammons
Media Relations Manager	(United States) Christa Mann
Benefits Coordinator	(United States) Jan Williams
Administrative Assistant	(United States) Maria Pacheco

Last updated: June 30, 2011
Source: Atlanta Beat

Coaching Staff

Position	Staff
Head Coach	(Australia) James Galanis
Asst. Coach	(United States) Russ Stroud

Last updated: June 30, 2011
Source: Atlanta Beat

== Standings ==
Pos	Team	Pld	W	D	L	GF	GA	GD	Pts	Promotion or relegation
1	Western New York Flash	18	13	3	2	40	18	+22	42	Advance to Championship
2	Philadelphia Independence	18	11	3	4	31	18	+13	36	Advance to Super Semifinal
3	magicJack	18	9	2	7	29	29	0	28 (Note: magicJack were deducted a point for various league violations.)	Advance to First round
4	Boston Breakers	18	5	4	9	19	24	−5	19 (Note: BOS: 7 pts; SKY: 4 pt)	Advance to First round
5	Sky Blue FC	18	5	4	9	24	29	−5	19	
6	Atlanta Beat	18	1	4	13	7	32	−25	7	

Updated to match(es) played on unknown. Source: soccerway
Rules for classification: 1) points, 2) goal difference, 3) head-to-head result.

== Statistics ==
Field player statistics
No.	Pos.	Nat.	Player	GP	GS	Min.	G	A	SHTS	SOG	FC	FS	Yellow card	Red card
2	DF	(United States) USA	Heather Mitts	8	8	708	0	0	0	0	5	3	2	0
3	MF	(United States) USA	Kylie Wright	15	13	1,045	0	1	6	1	10	1	2	0
4	DF	(United States) USA	Cat Whitehill	17	17	1,530	0	0	10	3	7	2	0	0
5	MF	(Czech Republic) CZE	Vendula Strnadova*	2	0	32	0	0	0	0	0	0	0	0
5	MF	(United States) USA	Kacey White	11	9	720	1	0	7	2	2	1	0	0
6	FW	(United States) USA	Angela Salem	11	9	823	0	0	6	1	9	6	1	0
7	DF	(United States) USA	Megan Jesolva	16	10	1,026	0	1	9	4	4	6	0	0
8	MF	(United States) USA	India Trotter	12	6	676	0	0	4	2	6	0	1	0
9	MF	(United States) USA	Bianca D'Agostino	10	5	418	0	0	5	3	7	0	1	0
10	MF	(United States) USA	Carli Lloyd	10	8	800	2	0	13	8	20	8	4	0
11	MF	(Canada) CAN	Kelly Parker	12	9	808	0	1	8	5	4	9	0	0
12	MF	(United States) USA	Lori Chalupny	17	17	1,451	2	0	24	10	18	28	0	0
14	DF	(United States) USA	Katherine Reynolds	18	18	1,620	0	0	1	1	6	2	1	0
15	MF	(United States) USA	Colleen Flanagan	5	2	195	0	0	0	0	4	0	2	0
16	MF	(United States) USA	Lyndsey Patterson	7	3	293	0	0	5	2	1	2	0	0
20	FW	(United States) USA	Kristina Larsen	6	3	331	0	0	14	10	3	2	0	0
21	FW	(United States) USA	Meghan Lenczyk	14	9	855	2	1	21	11	6	4	0	0
23	DF	(United States) USA	Analisa Marquez	17	16	1,363	0	0	2	1	15	5	2	0
24	FW	(Canada) CAN	Lauren Sesselmann	11	5	491	0	0	4	2	9	1	3	0
38	MF	(United States) USA	Julianne Sitch	2	2	118	0	0	0	0	0	0	0	0
40	DF	(United States) USA	Keeley Dowling	11	11	945	0	0	1	1	6	1	0	0

Updated to match played September 1, 2011
Source: Atlanta Beat

Goalkeeper statistics
No.	Nat	Player	GP	GS	Min.	SHTS	SVS	GA	GAA	PG	PA	W	L	T	SO
18	(United States) USA	Allison Lipsher	7	7	630	71	44	16	2.29	1	1	1	5	1	1
31	(United States) USA	Allison Whitworth	11	11	989	84	67	15	1.37	0	1	0	8	2	2

Updated to match played September 1, 2011
Source: Atlanta Beat

== Awards ==
=== WPS Player of the Week ===
Week	Player	Week's statline	Ref.
2	(United States) Allison Lipsher	11 SVS, SHO	
3	(United States) Allison Lipsher	10 SVS	

== See also ==
- 2011 National Women's Cup
- 2011 in American soccer
- Atlanta Beat
