= Angie Kerr =

American soccer player (born 1985)

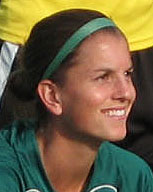

Personal information
- Full name: Angela Beth Woznuk Kerr
- Birth name: Angela Beth Woznuk
- Date of birth: March 29, 1985 (age 41)
- Place of birth: San Diego, California, U.S.
- Height: 5 ft 5 in (1.65 m)
- Position: Midfielder

College career
Years	Team	Apps	(Gls)
2003–2007	Portland Pilots		

Senior career*
Years	Team	Apps	(Gls)
2009	Saint Louis Athletica	18	(0)
2010	Atlanta Beat	22	(1)
2011	Sky Blue FC	13	(0)
2013–2014	Portland Thorns FC	29	(0)

International career^{‡}
2004	United States U-19	26	(12)
2005–2009	United States	10	(2)
- * Club domestic league appearances and goals as of 18:23, October 21, 2014 (UTC) ‡ National team caps and goals as of 22:58, September 29, 2009 (UTC)

Angela Beth Woznuk Kerr (née Woznuk; born March 29, 1985) is an American former soccer midfielder who played professionally through October 21, 2014. Her career culminated with Portland Thorns FC of the National Women's Soccer League and she played as a member of the United States women's national soccer team in 2005, 2008, and 2009.

== Playing career ==
Kerr's national participation began with the United States U-19 team, with whom she traveled to Thailand for the 2004 FIFA U-19 Women's World Championship, winning the tournament's Silver Ball and Bronze Shoe (with three goals). She would go on to join the women's national team in 2005, earning her tenth and final cap on the team's 2009 trip to Portugal for the Algarve Cup.

Meanwhile, her collegiate career would reach a high note as she was a standout player for the Portland Pilots as they won the NCAA title in 2005, helped by her goal and two assists in the final championship. In a total of 88 appearances for the Pilots, Kerr notched a total of 19 goals and 34 assists.

Angie began her Women's Professional Soccer (WPS) career when she was drafted 15th overall by the Saint Louis Athletica in the 2008 Women's Professional Soccer General Draft, making 18 appearances in her rookie season with team. On February 2, 2010, she was traded along with Kia McNeill and the rights to third round draft choice Amanda Poach, to the Atlanta Beat in exchange for the 1st pick in the Los Angeles Sol dispersal draft. She played in more than 20 games for the Beat and scored the only league goal of her career during her single season in Atlanta. She proceeded to play her third professional season with Sky Blue FC, though in a more limited capacity.

With the demise of WPS, it was not until the founding of the National Women's Soccer League (NWSL) that Kerr again had the opportunity to play professionally. The Portland Thorns FC selected her as the 16th overall pick of the 2013 National Women's Soccer League Supplemental Draft, giving her the chance to return to Portland as a hometown hero. She was waived by the Portland Thorns FC in September 2014. A consistent part of the Thorns first two seasons, during which she notched four assists in close to thirty appearances, she announced her retirement from playing professionally in October 2014.

== Career statistics ==
=== International ===
Appearances and goals by national team and year
National team	Year	Apps	Goals
United States	2005	1	0
United States	2006	0	0
United States	2007	0	0
United States	2008	5	1
United States	2009	4	1
Total		10	2

Scores and results list United States goal tally first, score column indicates score after each Kerr goal.

List of international goals scored by Angie Kerr
No.	Date	Venue	Opponent	Score	Result	Competition	Ref.
1	January 18, 2008	Guangzhou	Finland	4–1	4–1	2008 Four Nations Tournament	
2	March 4, 2009	Lagos, Portugal	Denmark	1–0	2–0	2009 Algarve Cup	

== Honors ==
Portland Thorns FC

- NWSL Championship: 2013
