= Collinsville Soccer Complex =

Planned sports complex in Illinois, US

Coordinates: 38.68685°N 90.034161°W

- Interactive map of Collinsville Soccer Complex
- Location: I-255 and Horseshoe Lake Rd. Collinsville, Illinois, United States
- Owner: AC St. Louis
- Capacity: 18,500 (main stadium)

Tenants
- Saint Louis Athletica (WPS); St. Louis MLS club (MLS); St. Louis Soccer United youth clubs (all potential)

Collinsville Soccer Complex, also known as The Fields, was a planned soccer-centered development to be located in Collinsville, Illinois, United States. The centerpiece of the complex was an 18,500-seat soccer-specific stadium that would have been the home stadium for professional soccer clubs in MLS and WPS based in the St. Louis area. The plan also included eight FIFA-approved artificial turf fields, as well as mixed-use development, which included retail, office, entertainment, educational, and residential areas. The entire development was valued at almost $600 million.

The proposed stadium location was roughly ten minutes away from downtown St. Louis, by the I-255/I-70/I-55 interchange.

All plans to begin construction had been in place, and the city of Collinsville had approved the project. Construction never began because MLS never awarded a franchise to St. Louis Soccer United (AC St. Louis), the ownership group that had spearheaded the professional soccer effort in St. Louis; although the city of Collinsville had approved of the plans, construction was not approved until a MLS team was guaranteed. Also, there were several homeowners who had not yet sold their property. As such, Saint Louis Athletica, the area's WPS team, began the league's first season in 2009 at Ralph Korte Stadium in Edwardsville, Illinois, but moved across the Mississippi River during the season to the Anheuser-Busch Center in Fenton, Missouri.

Eventually St. Louis was awarded a Major League Soccer team but to a different ownership in a different location. On August 20, 2019, Major League Soccer announced it had approved St. Louis as the league's 28th franchise and St. Louis City SC is expected to join in the 2023 season. The ownership is led by the Taylor family, founders of St. Louis based Enterprise Rent-A-Car, and Jim Kavanaugh, CEO of St Louis based World Wide Technology and Saint Louis FC owner. The team plays at Energizer Park next to Union Station in downtown St. Louis.

== See also ==
- Energizer Park
- National Car Rental Field
- Soccer in St. Louis
