= Tina Frimpong Ellertson =

American soccer coach and player (born 1982)

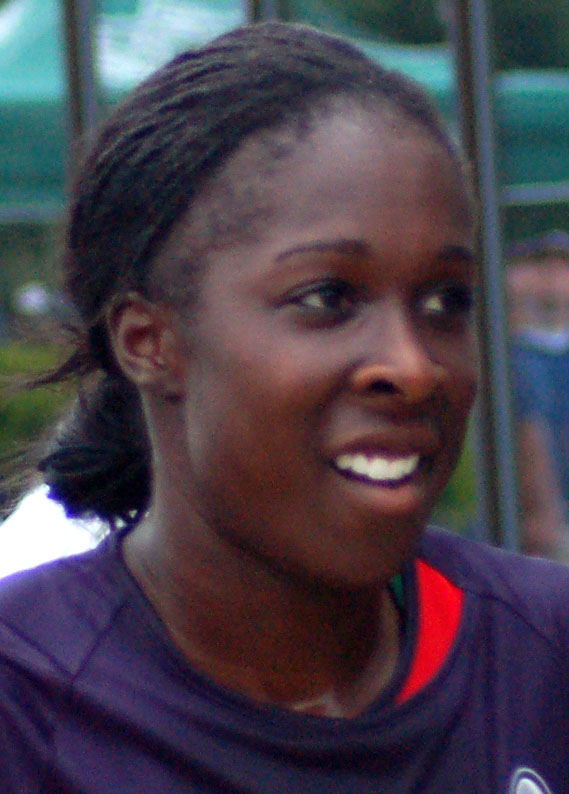

Personal information
- Full name: Christina Jo Frimpong Ellertson
- Birth name: Christina Jo Frimpong
- Date of birth: May 20, 1982 (age 44)
- Place of birth: Vancouver, Washington, United States
- Height: 5 ft 9 in (1.75 m)
- Positions: Defender; striker

College career
Years	Team	Apps	(Gls)
2001–2004	Washington Huskies		

Senior career*
Years	Team	Apps	(Gls)
2003–2005	Seattle Sounders Women	8	(8)
2009–2010	Saint Louis Athletica	26	(0)
2010	Atlanta Beat	16	(2)
2011	magicJack	17	(0)
2013	Portland Thorns FC	5	(0)

International career
2004	United States U-21		
2005–2008	United States	34	(1)

Managerial career
- 2013–2018: King's Way Christian HS
- 2014–2015: Portland Thorns FC U-17
- 2020–2023: Washington Huskies (assistant)
Medal record
Women's football (soccer)
Representing the United States
FIFA Women's World Cup
Bronze medal – third place	2007 China	Team
- * Club domestic league appearances and goals

Christina Jo Frimpong Ellertson (née Frimpong; born May 20, 1982) is an American soccer coach and former professional player who played as a defender for the United States women's national soccer team.

== Early life ==
Frimpong Ellertson was born and grew up in Vancouver, Washington. The daughter of Eka, a Nigerian mother and Joe, a Ghanaian father who migrated to the United States, Frimpong Ellertson played soccer throughout her childhood.

== Collegiate career ==
As a striker for the Huskies, Frimpong Ellertson was one of the best players in school history. She was twice named Pac-10 Player of the Year in 2003 and 2004, led the team to its first ever Elite Eight, and remains its all-time leading scorer. Frimpong Ellertson was inducted into the Pac-12 Conference Hall of Fame in 2022.

== Playing career ==
=== Club ===
On September 16, 2008, Frimpong Ellertson was one of the three players drafted for Saint Louis Athletica in the Women's Professional Soccer allocation of national team members, with the new league starting in April 2009. Frimpong Ellertson was a consistently solid presence in the Athletica back line, logging 1748 minutes for the season, the most on the team. She played as team captain whenever Lori Chalupny was not on the field, made the All-Star team and was nominated for WPS's Defender of the Year award.

When Saint Louis folded in May 2010, Frimpong Ellertson moved to Atlanta Beat alongside teammates Hope Solo and Eniola Aluko. After 16 games and two goals for the Beat, Frimpong Ellertson left by mutual consent in February 2011. She moved to a new franchise, magicJack, and quickly became a cornerstone of the team's defense, producing notable performances against Marta and Kelly Smith.

Frimpong Ellertson has also played previously for the Seattle Sounders of the W-League.

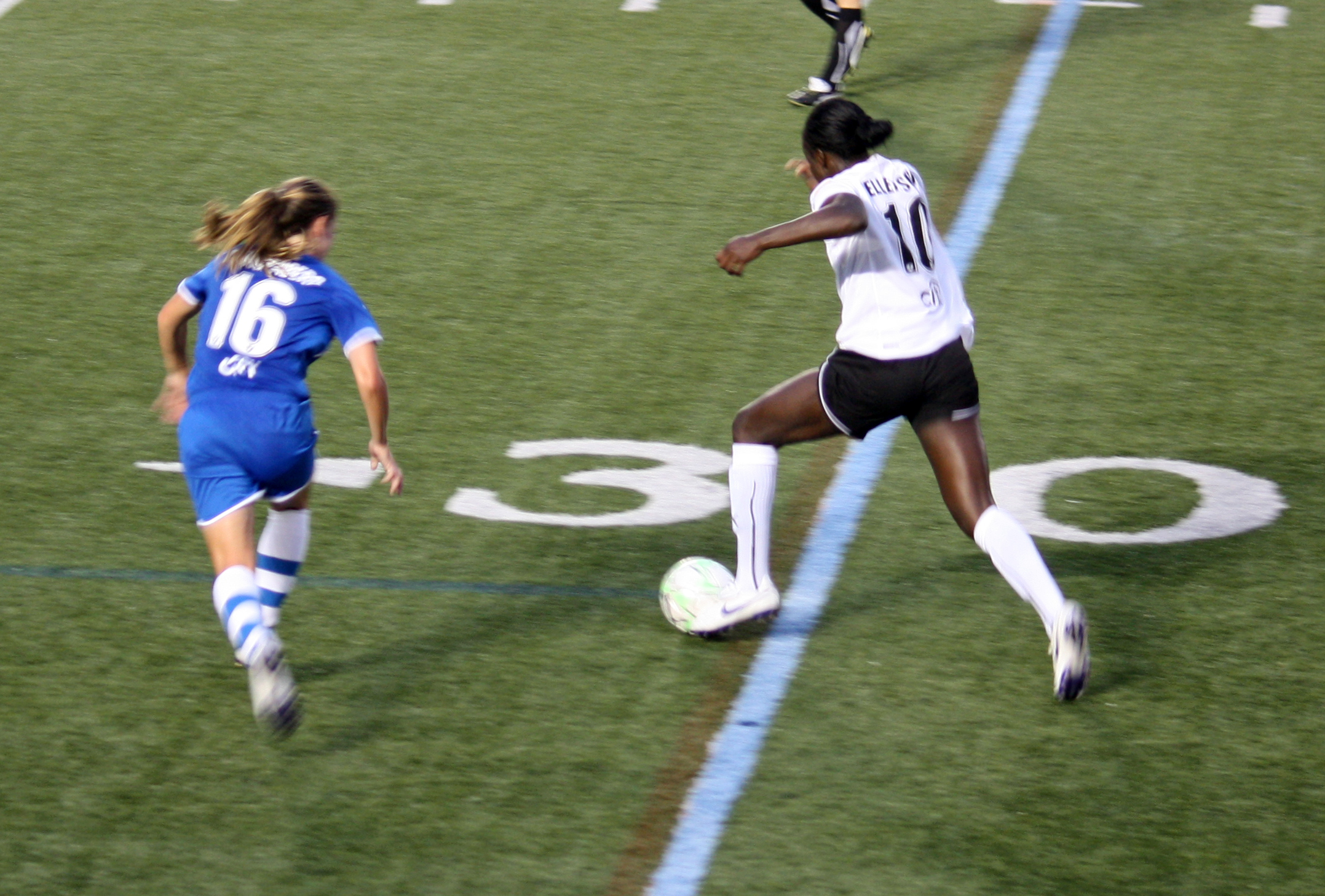
Ellertson in August 2011

In February 2013, Frimpong Ellertson was chosen in the first round of the National Women's Soccer League's supplemental draft by Portland Thorns FC, despite having stated that she would not be playing in the league. Nevertheless, she ultimately joined the Thorns a few months later, on July 31, after being repeatedly approached by Coach Cindy Parlow Cone. Frimpong Ellertson made five appearances for the Thorns, including an appearance as a substitute during the team's victory in the inaugural NWSL Championship match.

In February 2014, Frimpong Ellertson announced that she was retiring from the Thorns to focus on coaching and her family.

=== International ===
After April Heinrichs's reign as coach, Frimpong Ellertson tried out for the women's national soccer team, and earned her first cap against Ukraine on July 10, 2005. New coach Greg Ryan moved her to defender. She was named to the U.S. roster for the 2007 FIFA Women's World Cup and competed against Nigeria during group stage, against Brazil in the infamous semi-final in which Hope Solo was benched in favor of more experienced Briana Scurry, and against Norway in a 4–1 win in the third-place playoff match.

On December 13, 2008, at the Home Depot Center in Los Angeles, Frimpong Ellertson scored her only international goal against China in her final USWNT game, and in her only start at forward; a 1–0 game winner.

== Coaching career ==
Frimpong Ellertson began coaching while she was still playing. She was most recently an assistant coach at her alma mater Washington Huskies from 2020 to 2023.

== Personal life ==
Frimpong Ellertson married Brad Ellertson, with whom she has two daughters.

Frimpong Ellertson's eldest daughter, MacKenzie Frimpong-Ellertson, plays at the University of Portland.

== Career statistics ==
=== Club ===
Club	Season	League			Playoffs (Note: Includes NWSL Playoffs)		Total	
Club	Season	Division	Apps	Goals	Apps	Goals	Apps	Goals
Portland Thorns FC	2013	NWSL	3	0	2	0	5	0
Career total			3	0	2	0	5	0

=== International ===
Appearances and goals by national team and year
National team	Year	Apps	Goals
United States	2005	3	0
United States	2006	14	0
United States	2007	13	0
United States	2008	4	1
Total		34	1

Scores and results list United States goal tally first, score column indicates score after each Frimpong Ellertson goal.

List of international goals scored by Tina Frimpong Ellertson
No.	Date	Venue	Opponent	Score	Result	Competition	Ref.
1	December 13, 2008	Carson, California	China	1–0	1–0	Friendly	

== Honors ==
Portland Thorns FC

- NWSL Championship: 2013

Individual

- Pac-12 Conference Women's Soccer Player of the Year: 2003, 2004
