= 2008 WPS International Draft =

Women's soccer draft

The 2008 WPS International Draft took place on September 24, 2008. It was the first international draft held by Women's Professional Soccer to assign the WPS rights of international players to the American-based teams. For the 2009 season, teams were able to sign 5 international players to their roster.

== Round 1 ==
Pick	Player	Pos.	WPS Team	Previous Team
1	(Brazil) Formiga	MF	FC Gold Pride	Botucatu Futebol Clube
2	(England) Kelly Smith	FW	Boston Breakers	Arsenal L.F.C.
3	(Brazil) Marta	FW	Los Angeles Sol	Umeå IK
4	(Brazil) Daniela	MF	Saint Louis Athletica	Linköpings FC
5	(Brazil) Cristiane	FW	Chicago Red Stars	Corinthians
6	(Japan) Homare Sawa	MF	Washington Freedom	NTV Beleza
7	(Australia) Sarah Walsh	FW	Sky Blue FC	Pali Blues

== Round 2 ==
Pick	Player	Pos.	WPS Team	Previous Team
8	(Canada) Christine Sinclair	FW	FC Gold Pride	Vancouver Whitecaps
9	(Brazil) Fabiana	FW	Boston Breakers	Corinthians
10	(Japan) Aya Miyama	MF	Los Angeles Sol	Okayama Yunogo Belle
11	(France) Sonia Bompastor	MF	Washington Freedom	Olympique Lyonnais
12	(Australia) Heather Garriock	MF	Chicago Red Stars	Sydney FC
13	(Brazil) Renata Costa	MF	Saint Louis Athletica	Odense Boldklub
14	(Brazil) Rosana	FW	Sky Blue FC	SV Neulengbach

== Round 3 ==
Pick	Player	Pos.	WPS Team	Previous Team
15	(Japan) Eriko Arakawa	FW	FC Gold Pride	NTV Beleza
16	(Brazil) Maycon	MF	Boston Breakers	Saad Esporte Clube
17	(Sweden) Lotta Schelin	FW	Saint Louis Athletica	Olympique Lyonnais
18	(Australia) Lisa De Vanna	FW	Washington Freedom	Perth Glory FC
19	(England) Karen Carney	FW	Chicago Red Stars	Arsenal L.F.C.
20	(Canada) Melissa Tancredi	FW	Saint Louis Athletica	Atlanta Silverbacks
21	(Brazil) Ester	MF	Sky Blue FC	CEPE-Caxias

== Round 4 ==
Pick	Player	Pos.	WPS Team	Previous Team
22	(Brazil) Érika	DF	FC Gold Pride	Santos FC
23	(Japan) Shinobu Ohno	FW	Boston Breakers	NTV Beleza
24	(China) Han Duan	FW	Los Angeles Sol	Dalian Shide
25	(France) Louisa Necib	MF	Washington Freedom	Olympique Lyonnais
26	(Sweden) Caroline Jönsson	GK	Chicago Red Stars	LdB FC
27	(Iceland) Margrét Lára Viðarsdóttir	FW	Los Angeles Sol	Linköpings FC
28	(Canada) Kelly Parker	MF	Sky Blue FC	F.C. Indiana

== Draft notes ==
Draft order was determined by weighted results from a coach's poll about the strength of each team's USWNT allocation, which had occurred earlier that month.

== See also ==
- List of foreign WPS players
