= Carolyn Blank =

American soccer player (born 1988)

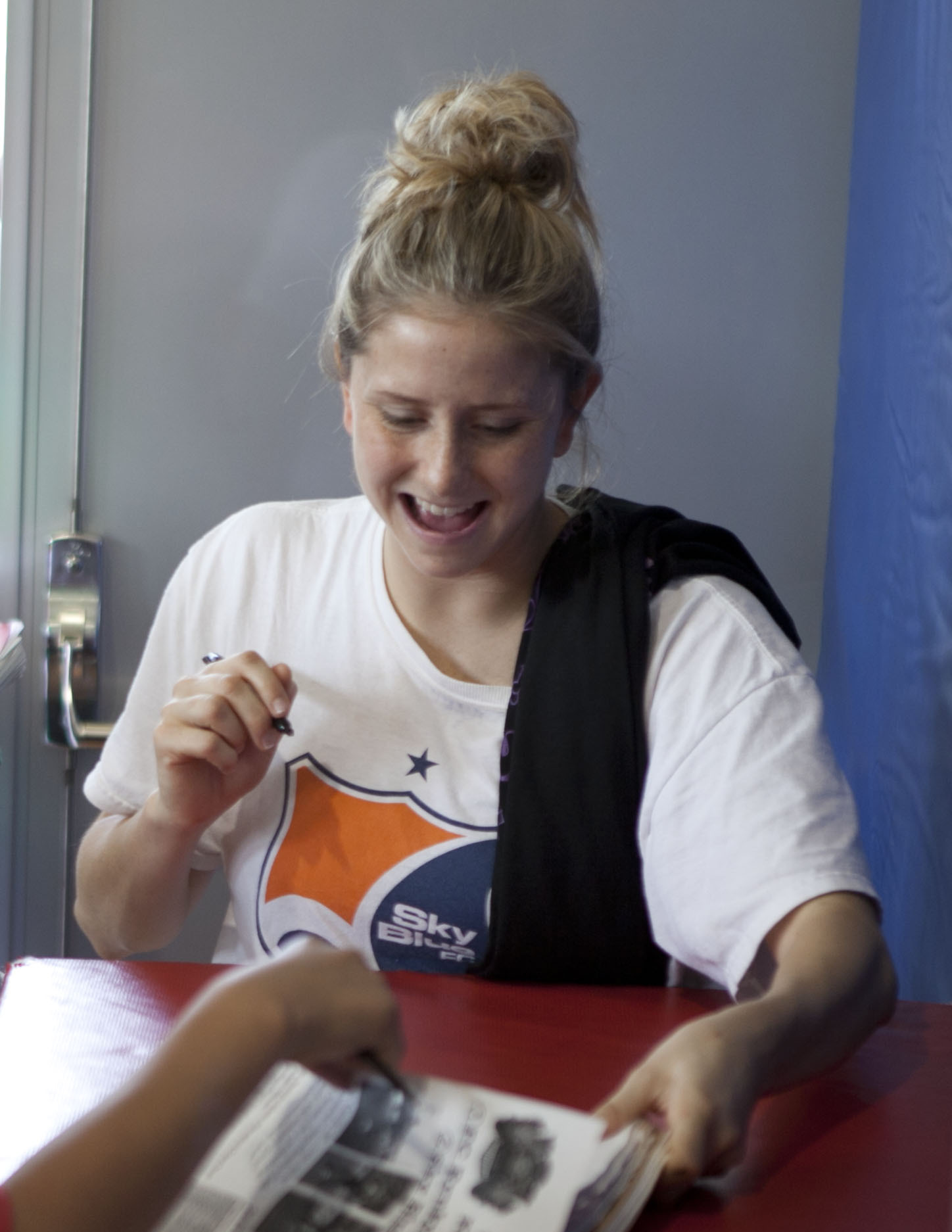

Personal information
- Date of birth: March 23, 1988 (age 38)
- Place of birth: Toms River, New Jersey
- Height: 1.70 m (5 ft 7 in)
- Position: Midfielder

College career
Years	Team	Apps	(Gls)
2006–2009	West Virginia Mountaineers	92	(13)

Senior career*
Years	Team	Apps	(Gls)
2010	Saint Louis Athletica	6	(1)
2010	Atlanta Beat	13	(1)
2011	Sky Blue FC	17	(1)
2011	Vittsjö GIK	5	(1)

International career
2005	United States U17		
2008	United States U20		
- * Club domestic league appearances and goals

Carolyn Blank (born March 23, 1988) is a retired American soccer player.

Raised in Toms River, New Jersey, she played prep soccer at Toms River High School East.
