= Niki Cross =

American soccer player (born 1985)

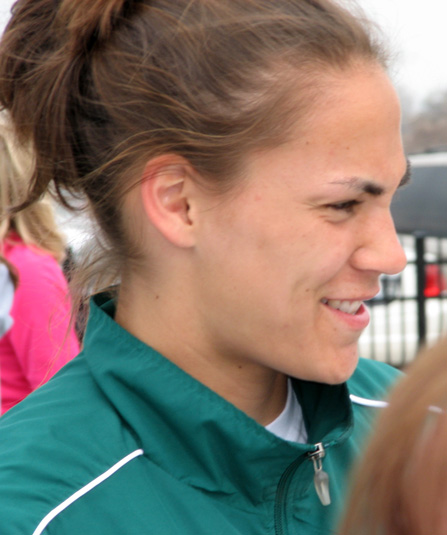
- Cross in 2009

Personal information
- Full name: Nicole Anne Cross
- Date of birth: May 30, 1985 (age 41)
- Place of birth: Brockton, Massachusetts, U.S.
- Height: 5 ft 10 in (1.78 m)
- Position: Defender

College career
| Years | Team | Apps | (Gls) |
| 2003–2006 | Connecticut Huskies | | |

Senior career*
| Years | Team | Apps | (Gls) |
| 2004 | Boston Renegades | | |
| 2005 | Bay State Select | 2 | (0) |
| 2006 | New England Mutiny | 8 | (2) |
| 2008 | SoccerPlus Connecticut | ? | (?) |
| 2008 | Umeå Södra FF | 6 | (0) |
| 2009–2010 | Saint Louis Athletica | 15 | (1) |
| 2010 | FC Gold Pride | 1 | (0) |
| 2010–2011 | Newcastle Jets FC | 9 | (0) |
| 2011 | Boston Breakers | 6 | (0) |
| 2011 | Medkila IL | 7 | (1) |
| 2012–2014 | FC Bayern Munich | 6 | (0) |
| 2014 | Washington Spirit | 10 | (0) |
| 2015 | Houston Dash | 9 | (0) |
- * Club domestic league appearances and goals as of June 20, 2015

Nicole Anne Cross (born May 30, 1985) is a retired American soccer player. She last played for the Houston Dash of the National Women's Soccer League in the 2015 season; the team acquired her via trade with the Washington Spirit on December 2, 2014. She retired partway through the 2015 season, making her last appearance on August 1 against the Washington Spirit.

== Club career ==
=== Connecticut Huskies ===
Cross played in 92 career games ranking 13th on the UConn Games Played list.

She played for the Boston Renegades in 2004. In 2005 she played for Women's Premier Soccer League (WPSL) club Bay State Select, alongside Brazil national team players Daniela Alves Lima and Raquel de Souza Noronha. She made two appearances.

=== Umeå Södra FF ===
On August 11, 2008, Cross joined Swedish Damallsvenskan club Umeå Södra FF.

=== 2010 ===
In 2010 Cross attended FC Gold Pride's pre-season camp but was released. Her club Saint Louis Athletica then folded two months into the season. She joined Boston Breakers as a developmental player between June and August, but only played for the reserve team Boston Aztec in the Women's Premier Soccer League (WPSL). After being released again she was signed by FC Gold Pride until the end of the season. Following the American season she traveled to Australia to play for Newcastle Jets.

=== Medkila IL ===
On August 31, 2011, Cross inked a contract in Norway with Medkila IL.

=== FC Bayern Munich ===
On January 12, 2012, Cross joined German Bundesliga side FC Bayern Munich. On May 9, 2012, Cross signed a new two-year contract to remain in Munich. On May 12, 2012, she was part of the FC Bayern Munich squad who dethroned the German Cup title holders 1. FFC Frankfurt with a 2–0 in the 2011–12 final in Cologne and celebrated the biggest success of the club's history since winning the 1976 championship.

== Honors ==
=== Club ===
FC Bayern Munich

- Frauen DFB-Pokal: 2011–12

== Personal life ==
Cross holds a German passport. Married Molly S Bodell on Feb. 6th 2016. Sister-in-law Adelaide Bodell.
