= Ester (footballer) =

Brazilian footballer (born 1982)

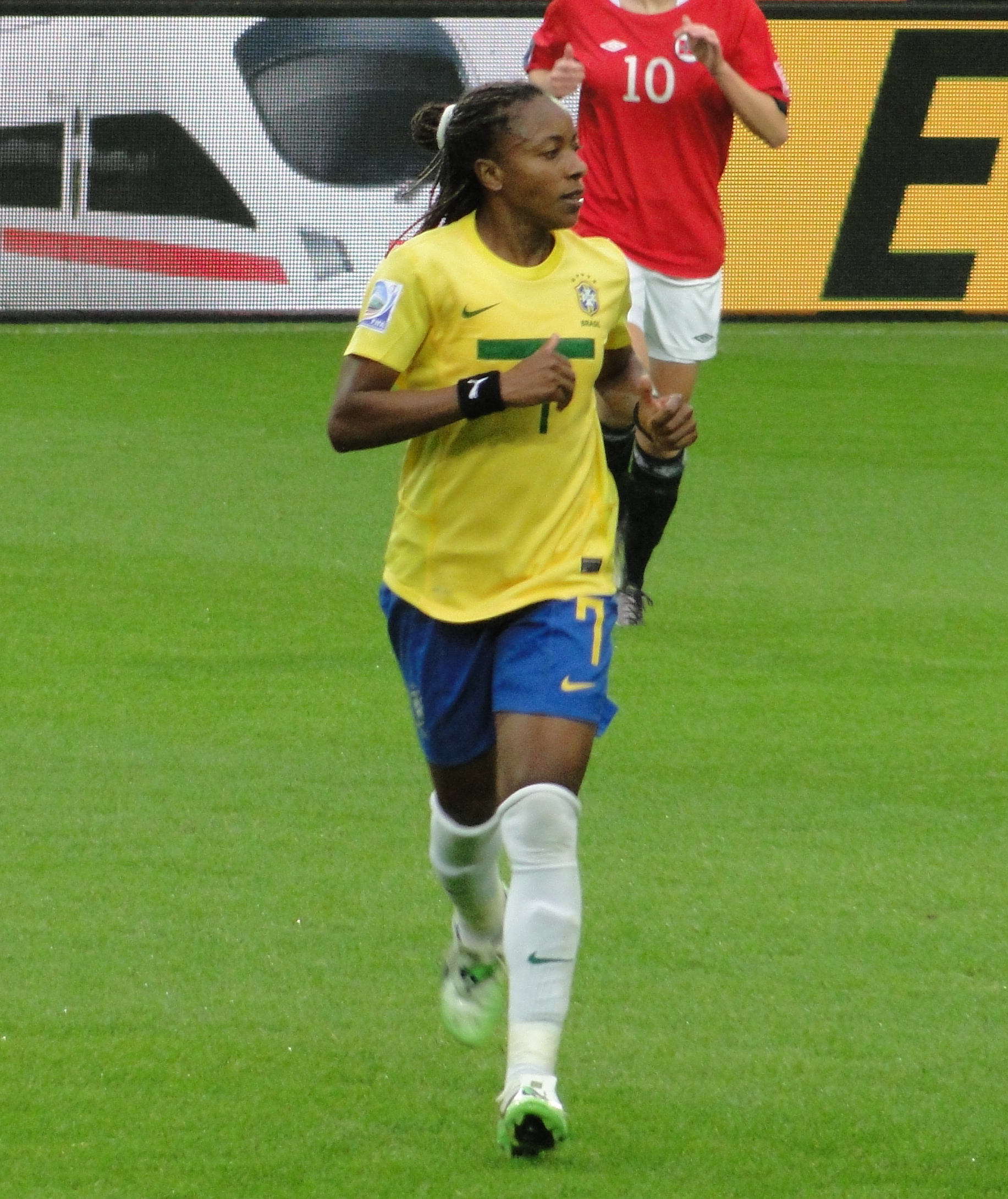

Personal information
- Full name: Ester Aparecida dos Santos
- Date of birth: 9 December 1982 (age 43)
- Place of birth: Guarulhos, São Paulo
- Height: 1.64 m (5 ft 4 1/2 in)
- Position: Defensive midfielder

Senior career*
Years	Team	Apps	(Gls)
- Clube Atlético Juventus
2001–2006	Santos FC		
2007	CEPE-Caxias		
2007–2011	Santos FC		
2012	WFC Rossiyanka	8	(0)
2013	Chelsea Ladies	10	(0)
2013–2014	BV Cloppenburg	16	(0)
2015	Kindermann	3	(0)
2015	São Paulo		
2016	Vasco da Gama		
2016	União (RN)		
2016	Rio Branco (AC)		
2017	Foz Cataratas	14	(0)
2017	CRESSPOM		
2018	3B da Amazônia		
2018	São José	4	(0)

International career
2003–2012	Brazil	56	(1)
Medal record
Representing Brazil
Football
Olympic Games
Silver medal – second place	2008 Beijing	Team competition
Pan American Games
Gold medal – first place	2003 Santo Domingo	Team competition
Gold medal – first place	2007 Rio de Janeiro	Team competition
- * Club domestic league appearances and goals

Ester Aparecida dos Santos (born 9 December 1982), commonly known mononymously as Ester, is a Brazilian former footballer. She played as a "volante" (defensive midfielder) for clubs including Chelsea of the English FA WSL and BV Cloppenburg of the German Frauen-Bundesliga. Ester was part of the Brazil women's national football team which finished as runners-up in the 2007 World Cup and 2008 Summer Olympics.

== Career ==
Ester began playing as a child in her neighbourhood near the São Paulo-Guarulhos International Airport. She was signed for Clube Atlético Juventus after a trial, then moved on to Santos FC.

In 2007 Ester played for CEPE-Caxias in Rio de Janeiro. She rejoined Santos in January 2008, following her successful season away.

In the 2008 WPS International Draft, Ester was selected by Sky Blue FC alongside compatriot Rosana, but did not join the team. Instead Ester found success in the Copa Libertadores Femenina with Santos in 2009 and 2010.

Ester was part of a Brazilian contingent at Russian champions WFC Rossiyanka in 2012, playing in the UEFA Women's Champions League defeat to Turbine Potsdam.

In 2013, Ester made a total of 10 FA WSL appearances for Chelsea, before departing for newly promoted Bundesliga club BV Cloppenburg in September 2013 with three games of the English season remaining. Chelsea manager Emma Hayes sold Sofia Jakobsson to the German team at the same time, saying: "We received an offer from Cloppenburg which we feIt was good business for the club."

When Vasco da Gama relaunched again in 2016, Ester was signed to provide experience to the team's younger players. After her retirement from football Ester settled in Arapongas and worked as a businesswoman.

== International ==
Ester was called up to the Brazil women's national football team in 2003. She had been on the fringes of the squad, until winning her place in midfield during Brazil's 2007 Pan American Games campaign. She maintained her position as the team's defensive midfielder for the 2007 FIFA Women's World Cup. She played in the final, which Brazil lost 2–0 to Germany.

Ester played in the 2011 FIFA Women's World Cup as well as the 2008 and 2012 Summer Olympics. At the beginning of the 2012 tournament in London, she had 56 caps and one goal for the national team.

== See also ==
- Foreign players in the FA WSL
