= Lori Chalupny =

American soccer player (born 1984)

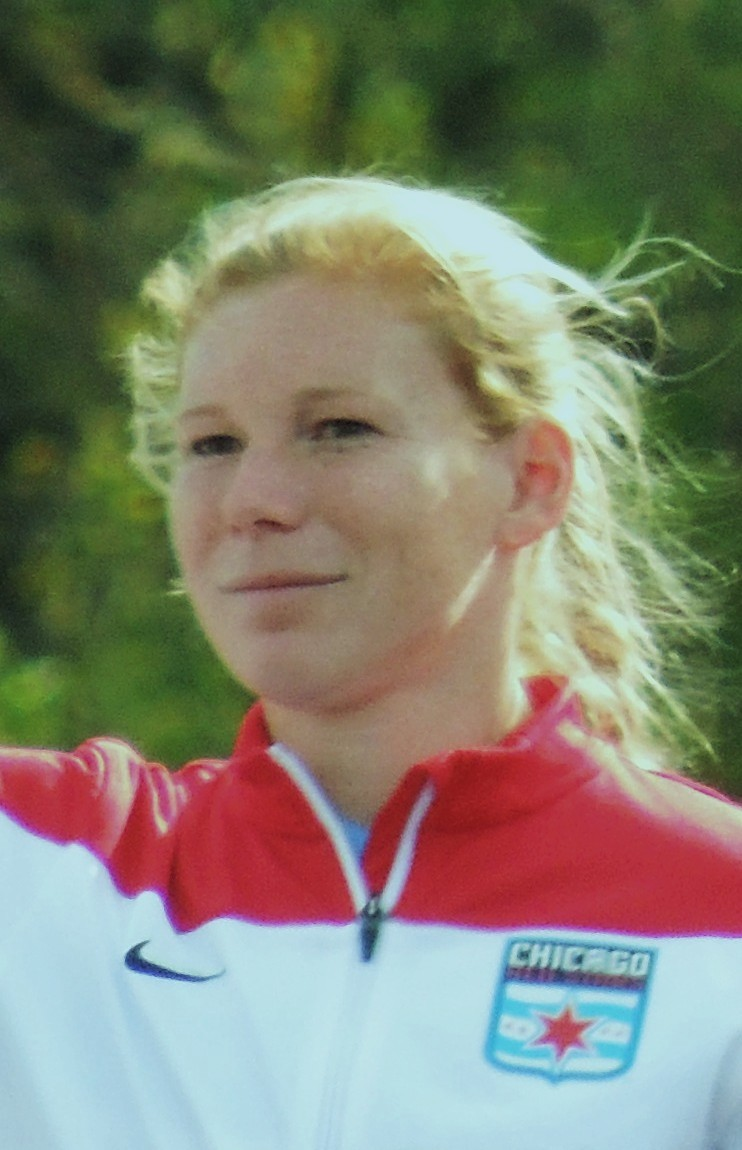
- Chalupny with the Chicago Red Stars in 2015

Personal information
- Full name: Lori Christine Chalupny
- Date of birth: January 29, 1984 (age 42)
- Place of birth: St. Louis, Missouri, United States
- Height: 5 ft 4 in (1.63 m)
- Position: Midfielder

Youth career
- J.B. Marine S.C.

College career
| Years | Team | Apps | (Gls) |
| 2002–2005 | North Carolina Tar Heels | | |

Senior career*
| Years | Team | Apps | (Gls) |
| 2006–2007 | River Cities Futbol Club | 0 | (0) |
| 2009–2010 | Saint Louis Athletica | 24 | (3) |
| 2010–2011 | Atlanta Beat | 32 | (4) |
| 2012 | Chicago Red Stars (WPSL-E) | 13 | (5) |
| 2012 | AIK Fotboll Dam | 9 | (1) |
| 2013–2015 | Chicago Red Stars (NWSL) | 52 | (11) |

International career
- United States U-16
| | United States U-19 | 21 | |
| | United States U-21 | 14 | |
| 2001–2015 | United States | 106 | (10) |

Managerial career
- 2018–: Maryville Saints
Medal record
Summer Olympics
| Gold medal – first place | 2008 Beijing | Team |
FIFA Women's World Cup
| Bronze medal – third place | 2007 China | Team |
| Gold medal – first place | 2015 Canada | Team |
- * Club domestic league appearances and goals

Lori Christine Chalupny Lawson (née Chalupny; born January 29, 1984) is a former American soccer player. As a member of the United States women's national soccer team, she won gold at the 2008 Beijing Olympics and the 2015 FIFA Women's World Cup. She is currently the head woman's soccer coach of Maryville University in St. Louis.

== Early life ==
Chalupny was born and raised in St. Louis, Missouri. At the age of five, Lori spent time at an after-school program playing soccer with other boys in the program. Chalupny recalls:

"I'd literally turn black from the asphalt."

She then went on to play soccer at Nerinx Hall High School where she was also on the Honor Roll her sophomore, junior, and senior years. She also played for club soccer team, J.B. Marine S.C. She was named NSCAA and Parade All-American as a junior and senior.

== College career ==
Chalupny played for the University of North Carolina at Chapel Hill from 2002 to 2005 and won an NCAA championship title with the Tar Heels as a sophomore in 2003. After missing much of her freshman season due to injury, she played in 16 games, scored three goals and served seven assists. She was subsequently named to the All-ACC First Team, the NSCAA Second-Team All-American, and the ACC All-Freshman Team. During her second year with the team, she helped the team go undefeated with a 27–0–0 record and win the NCAA championship starting 26 of 27 games, scoring 11 goals and serving 12 assists. She was named First-Team All-ACC and NSCAA All-American the same year. In 2004, she scored six goals and served five assists in the 23 games in which she played. In addition to being named Most Valuable Player by Soccer America, she was named First-Team NSCAA All-American for the second consecutive year and First-Team All-ACC for the third. During her final year with the Tar Heels, she scored ten goals and served eight assists playing as a midfielder. The Tar Heels finished the season with a 23–1–1 record under her leadership as captain for the second consecutive year. She finished her college career with 30 goals and 32 assists from the midfield.

== Club career ==
In April 2006, Chalupny joined River Cities Futbol Club of the Women's Premier Soccer League.

=== WPS, 2009–2011 ===
On September 16, 2008, Chalupny was one of the three players drafted for Saint Louis Athletica in the 2008 WPS Player Allocation of national team members, with the new league starting play in April 2009. She scored the first home goal of the season off of a corner kick in a 1–0 win against FC Gold Pride. She was team captain, made the All-Star team, and was nominated for WPS's Player of the Year award the same year. During the 2010 and 2011 seasons, she played for the Atlanta Beat and appeared in 15 and 17 games respectively and scored 2 goals in each season.

Chalupny's Club Career
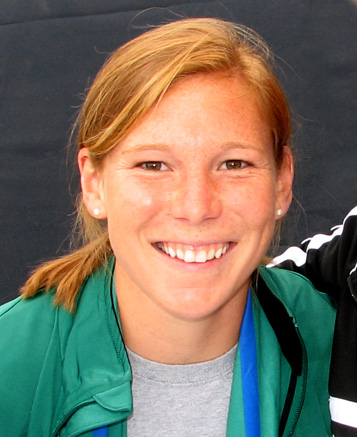
Lori Chalupny in 2009

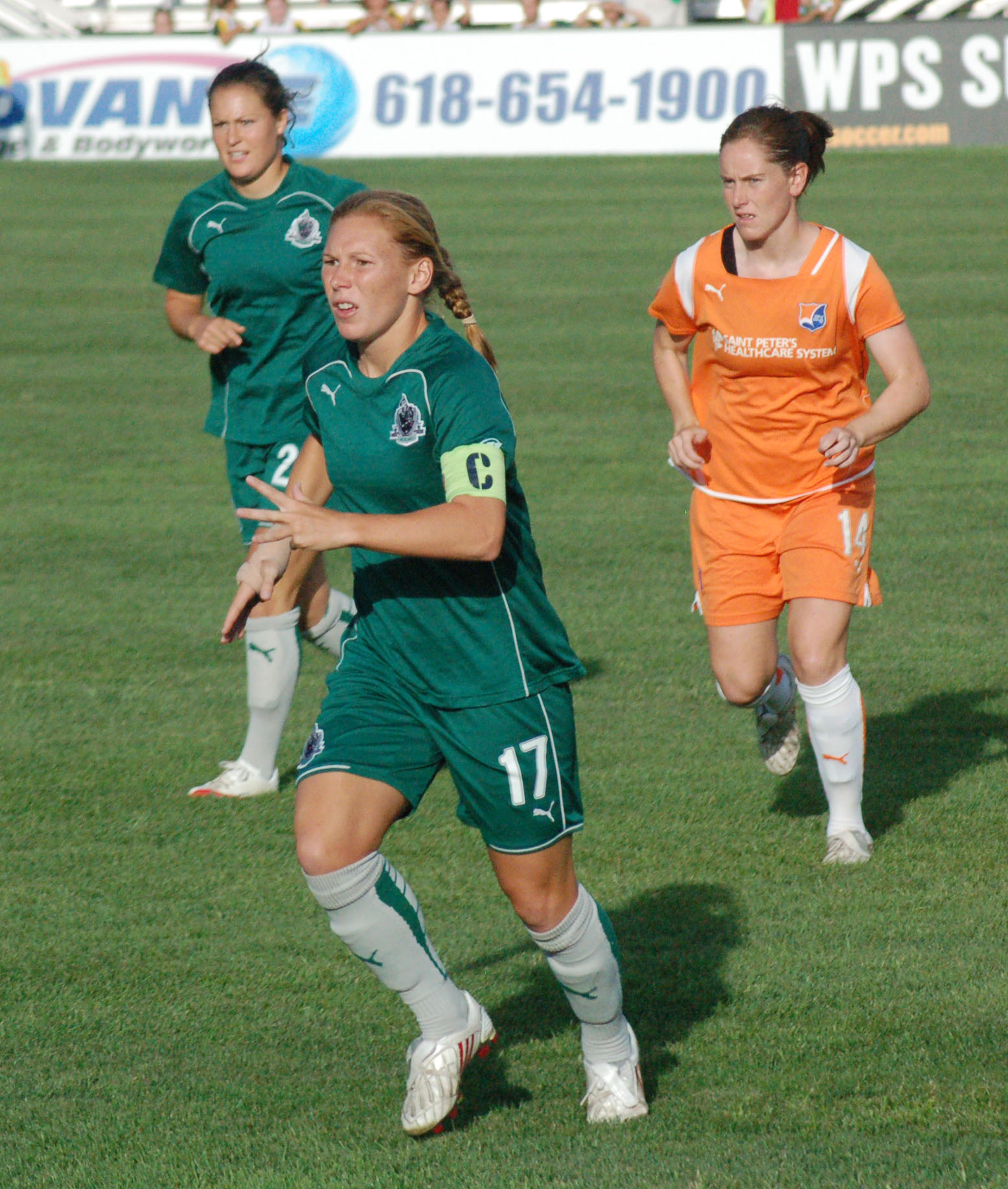
Lori playing for St. Louis against Sky Blue FC in 2009

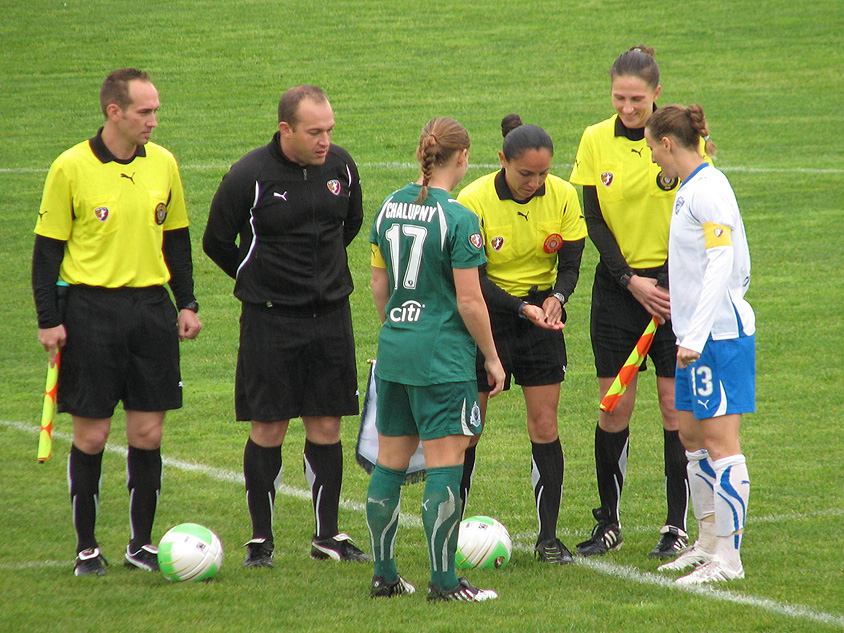
Coin toss against Kristine Lilly, 2010

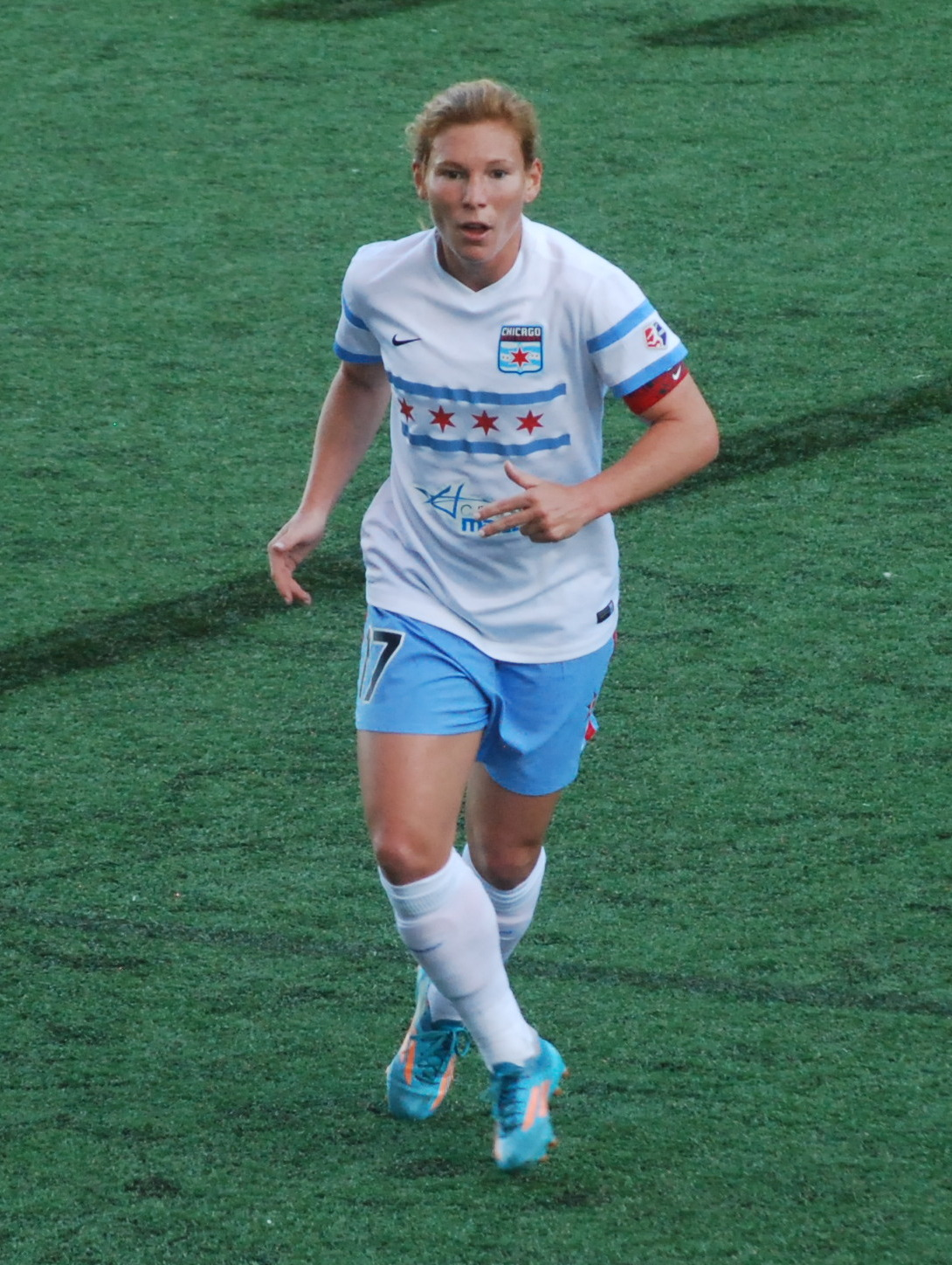
For Red Stars at Seattle Reign FC, June 7, 2014

=== Chicago Red Stars (WPSL-Elite) and AIK Fotboll, 2012 ===
After the folding of the WPS in early 2012, she played for the Chicago Red Stars in Women's Premier Soccer League Elite, appearing in ten games and scoring five goals. On August 8, 2012, she joined AIK Fotboll Dam in the Swedish Damallsvenskan.

=== Chicago Red Stars (NWSL), 2013–2015 ===
On February 5, 2013, she rejoined the Chicago Red Stars in the new National Women's Soccer League. Chalupny captained the Red Stars during the inaugural season, played 18 matches and scored 5 goals, the highest scored by a member of the team; and was named to NWSL 2013 best eleven.

In 2014 National Women's Soccer League season, Chalupny captained Chicago Red Stars to fifth place, played in a team high of 23 matches and 2003 minutes, and scored five goals.

Chalupny retired from professional soccer after the 2015 National Women's Soccer League season, and on July 30, 2016, the Red Stars retired squad number 17 in her honor.

Chalupny was the only player who suited up for the Red Stars to publicly support then Red Stars majority owner, Arnim Whisler, while the club was in the midst of the Rory Dames abuse scandal. When the Red Stars' supporter group called for Whisler to sell his shares of the club in December 2021, Chalupny replied to them on Twitter (in full), "I love you guys but I disagree with this statement. Arnim is a man of great character whose contributions to the NWSL and to the growth of the sport are immeasurable. I encourage you to reconsider these demands and would be happy to speak with you to share my experience." Due to Whisler's knowledge of Dames' abuse, she received derision in her replies for saying this.

== International career ==
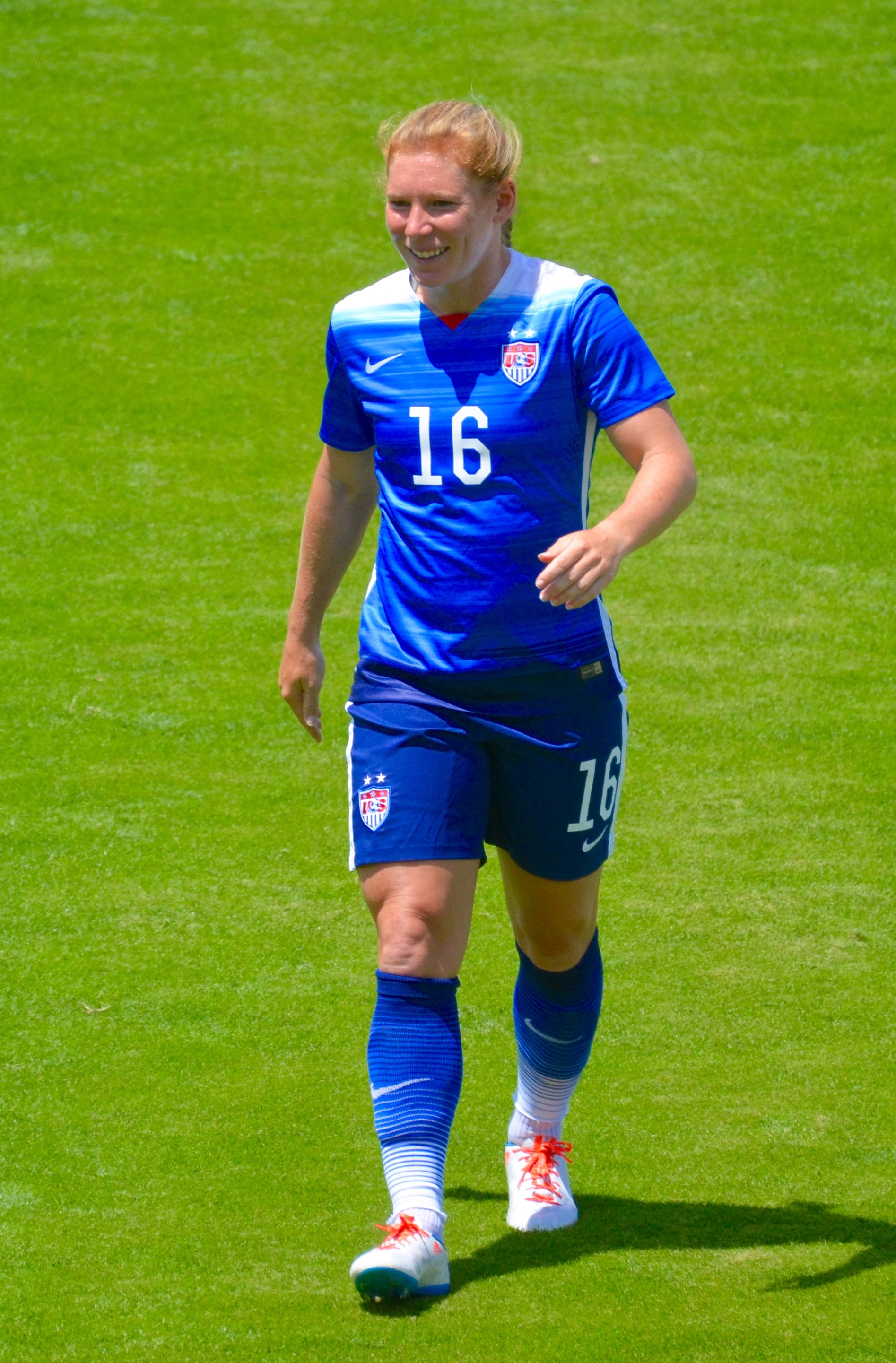

A member of the U.S. national under-16, 19 and 21 teams, Chalupny earned her first cap for the senior team on March 7, 2001, against Italy. She scored her first goal for the U.S. senior team on May 9, 2004, against Mexico. Although she predominantly played left back at the 2005 Algarve Cup, she also played as an outside midfielder.

In January 2006, Chalupny suffered a concussion after two blows to the head in a game against France. She was ordered by her doctors to take several months off, and did not return to national team play until July 2006. She started at midfield in all six of the United States' games at the 2007 FIFA Women's World Cup, and scored two goals, one of which was the game-winning goal in the U.S. 1–0 win over Nigeria on September 18, 2007. The goal, coming just 57 seconds into the game, was the second-fastest in Women's World Cup history.

Chalupny played in four games for the U.S. at the 2008 Summer Olympics. In the first game, she received a punch intended for the ball from the keeper and left the field. She scored one goal against Japan in the semi-final. The U.S. team won the tournament and took the Olympic gold medal. During the 2009 Algarve Cup, Chalupny was named co-captain of the team. She played every minute of five matches in 2009, captaining the U.S. team in a 1–0 win against Germany after co-captain Christie Rampone became pregnant.

From 2009 to November 2014, Chalupny was not called to play for the United States women's national soccer team due to a history of concussions. However, after approaching the U.S. Soccer Federation in 2014 and passing numerous tests, she was called up by the team in December 2014. National team head coach Jill Ellis selected Chalupny as part of the roster for the 2014 International Tournament of Brasilia. Ellis also selected her for the national team roster for the 2015 FIFA Women's World Cup.

On August 17, 2015, Chalupny announced that she was retiring from international soccer after Celebration Tour. She said: "there is no better way to go out than as a world champion and this just seemed like the right time to put a cap on my international career"

== Career statistics ==
=== Club ===
Appearances and goals by club, season and competition
| Club | Season | League | | | Playoffs (Note: Include WPS playoffs and NWSL playoffs) | | Total | |
| Club | Season | Division | Apps | Goals | Apps | Goals | Apps | Goals |
|---|---|---|---|---|---|---|---|---|
| Saint Louis Athletica | 2009 | WPS | 18 | 2 | 1 | 0 | 19 | 2 |
| Saint Louis Athletica | 2010 | WPS | 6 | 1 | — | | 6 | 1 |
| Atlanta Beat | 2010 | WPS | 15 | 2 | — | | 15 | 2 |
| Atlanta Beat | 2011 | WPS | 17 | 2 | — | | 17 | 2 |
| AIK Fotboll | 2012 | Damallsvenskan | 9 | 1 | — | | 9 | 1 |
| Chicago Red Stars | 2013 | NWSL | 18 | 5 | — | | 18 | 5 |
| Chicago Red Stars | 2014 | NWSL | 23 | 5 | — | | 23 | 5 |
| Chicago Red Stars | 2015 | NWSL | 11 | 1 | 1 | 0 | 12 | 1 |
| Career total | | | 117 | 19 | 2 | 0 | 119 | 19 |

=== International ===
Appearances and goals by national team and year
| National team | Year | Apps | Goals |
|---|---|---|---|
| United States | 2001 | 4 | 0 |
| United States | 2003 | 1 | 0 |
| United States | 2004 | 4 | 1 |
| United States | 2005 | 6 | 1 |
| United States | 2006 | 14 | 0 |
| United States | 2007 | 24 | 4 |
| United States | 2008 | 34 | 2 |
| United States | 2009 | 5 | 0 |
| United States | 2014 | 3 | 0 |
| United States | 2015 | 11 | 2 |
| Total | | 106 | 10 |

Scores and results list the United States' goal tally first, score column indicates score after each Chalupny goal.

List of international goals scored by Lori Chalupny
| No. | Date | Venue | Opponent | Score | Result | Competition | Ref. |
|---|---|---|---|---|---|---|---|
| 1 | May 9, 2004 | Albuquerque, New Mexico | Mexico | 3–0 | 3–0 | Friendly | |
| 2 | June 26, 2005 | Virginia Beach, Virginia | Canada | 1–0 | 2–0 | Friendly | |
| 3 | January 30, 2007 | Guangzhou | China | 1–0 | 2–0 | Four Nations Tournament | |
| 4 | May 12, 2007 | Frisco, Texas | Canada | 3–1 | 6–2 | Friendly | |
| 5 | September 18, 2007 | Shanghai | Nigeria | 1–0 | 1–0 | World Cup: Group B | |
| 6 | September 30, 2007 | Shanghai | Norway | 3–0 | 4–1 | World Cup: third place match | |
| 7 | August 18, 2008 | Beijing | Japan | 2–1 | 4–2 | Olympics: semifinal | |
| 8 | September 20, 2008 | Bridgeview, Illinois | Republic of Ireland | 1–0 | 2–0 | Friendly | |
| 9 | April 4, 2015 | St. Louis | New Zealand | 2–0 | 4–0 | Friendly | |
| 10 | May 17, 2015 | Carson, California | Mexico | 2–1 | 5–1 | Friendly | |

== Coaching career ==
In 2011, Chalupny was an assistant coach for the Washington University in St. Louis women's soccer team. From 2013 to January 1, 2018, she was the assistant coach at Maryville University. As of January 1, 2018, she became the head coach of Maryville University.

== Honors and awards ==
Chalupny is a two-time winner of the women's Keough Award for outstanding soccer player from the St. Louis area, and won US Soccer's Youth Player of the Year Award in 2005.

North Carolina Tar Heels

- NCAA Division I women's soccer tournament: 2003

United States

- Summer Olympics: 2008
- FIFA Women's World Cup: 2015

Individual

- NWSL Best XI: 2013

== In popular culture ==
=== Video games ===
Chalupny was featured along with her national teammates in the EA Sports' FIFA video game series in FIFA 16, the first time women players were included in the game.

=== Ticker Tape Parade and White House Honor ===
Following the United States' win at the 2015 FIFA Women's World Cup, Chalupny and her teammates became the first women's sports team to be honored with a Ticker tape parade in New York City. Each player received a key to the city from Mayor Bill de Blasio. In October of the same year, the team was honored by President Barack Obama at the White House.

| Preceded by Christie Rampone | WNT captain 2009 | Succeeded by Shannon Boxx |
