= Daniela (footballer) =

Brazilian footballer (born 1984)

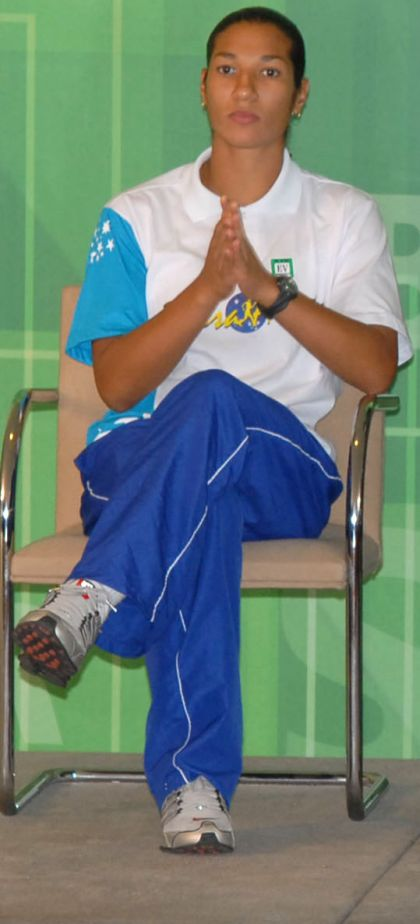

Personal information
- Full name: Daniela Alves Lima
- Date of birth: 12 January 1984 (age 42)
- Place of birth: São Paulo, Brazil
- Height: 1.67 m (5 ft 6 in)
- Position: Midfielder

Senior career*
Years	Team	Apps	(Gls)
- Portuguesa
2003	San Diego Spirit	17	(0)
2004	Kopparbergs/Göteborg FC	3	(1)
2005	Hampton Roads Piranhas	4	(0)
2005–2006	Bay State Select		
2007	Saad Esporte Clube		
2008	Linköpings FC	22	(6)
2009	Saint Louis Athletica	4	(2)
2010	Hampton Roads Piranhas	1	(0)

International career^{‡}
2002	Brazil U-19		
1999–2008	Brazil		
Medal record
Representing Brazil
Olympic Games – Women's Football
Silver medal – second place	2004 Athens	Team competition
Silver medal – second place	2008 Beijing	Team competition
Pan American Games – Women's Football
Gold medal – first place	2003 Santo Domingo	Team competition
Gold medal – first place	2007 Rio de Janeiro	Team competition
- * Club domestic league appearances and goals as of 22:11, 30 September 2009 (UTC) ‡ National team caps and goals as of 22:11, 30 September 2009 (UTC)

Daniela Alves Lima (born 12 January 1984), commonly known as Daniela, is a former Brazilian football midfielder who played for professional clubs in Brazil, Sweden and the United States. As a member of the Brazil women's national football team she participated in two FIFA Women's World Cups and three Olympic Games. Daniela was a box-to-box central midfielder who was renowned for her powerful long range shots.

== Club career ==
Daniela had already played for four seasons at the women's section of São Paulo club Portuguesa, (Note: Portuguesa's female section were sometimes known as Lusa Sant'Anna due to an agreement with a local college of that name.) when she was signed by San Diego Spirit of Women's United Soccer Association (WUSA). Having turned 19 the month before her February 2003 transfer, Daniela became WUSA's youngest player. She started 14 of her 17 regular season appearances in 2003 and posted three assists. When WUSA collapsed at the end of that season, Daniela moved to Europe and signed for Kopparbergs/Göteborg FC of Sweden's Damallsvenskan. She made three league appearances and scored one goal in a 2004 season beset by injury.

For 2005 Daniela moved back to the United States and played four games for Hampton Roads Piranhas in the pro–am W-League. She finished the 2005 season playing in the Women's Premier Soccer League (WPSL) with Bay State Select, scoring seven goals in 10 appearances. She remained with Bay State for 2006 and was named to the all-league team in both 2005 and 2006, before returning to Brazil with Saad Esporte Clube. At the inaugural 2007 edition of the Copa do Brasil de Futebol Feminino, Daniela was named player of the tournament and was top goalscorer with 14 goals as Saad won the trophy.

Sweden's Linköpings FC contracted Daniela and her Brazil teammate Cristiane for the 2008 Damallsvenskan season. After signing, Daniela stressed that she had improved as a player since her unhappy experience at Göteborg in 2004. She played in all 22 of Linköpings' league matches, scoring six goals, as the team finished runners-up behind Umeå IK.

Women's Professional Soccer (WPS), a new professional league formed in the United States, entered Daniela into its inaugural International Draft. She was selected as the Saint Louis Athletica's first pick and joined the team for its 2009 season.

In Athletica's fourth game against the Washington Freedom, Daniela scored the club's first two goals of the season in a fractious and controversial 3–3 draw. During the match, a challenge by Abby Wambach, described as "vicious" and "reckless", left Daniela with a broken tibia and torn knee ligaments. Wambach received a yellow card for the tackle but was later given a one-match suspension by the league's disciplinary panel. Saint Louis Athletica's doctor said that the injury would rule Daniela out "indefinitely".

She made a comeback with Hampton Road Piranhas in the 2010 W-League, but featured for 18 minutes of one match. The injury brought about Daniela's early retirement from football. She returned to São Paulo and became the proprietor of a butcher shop.

== International career ==
Brazil wanted to include Daniela in their squad for the 1999 FIFA Women's World Cup but at the age of 15 years she was not eligible to participate. Instead she made her debut in the next game, a friendly defeat to the United States. An inexperienced Brazil lost 6–0 to the world champions at Mile High Stadium in Denver on 26 September 1999.

At 16 years old Daniela was a member of the Brazil team that participated in the 2000 Sydney Olympics and finished in fourth place. At the pre-tournament training camp Daniela fought with teammate Mônica. The confrontation was attributed to premenstrual syndrome.

Daniela captained Brazil's under-19 team at the 2002 FIFA U-19 Women's World Championship, scoring three goals as the team reached the semi-final. Ahead of the 2003 FIFA Women's World Cup, she was named in Brazil's squad and praised by the coach: "She is very good. Everyone is interested in her." At the tournament she performed well and struck a celebrated goal as Brazil upset Olympic champions Norway 4–1. Sweden defeated Brazil 2–1 in the quarter-final.

Daniela and Brazil collected silver medals at the 2004 and 2008 editions of the Olympic Games. At the 2007 FIFA Women's World Cup in China, Brazil produced a striking 4–0 semi-final win over the United States but were beaten 2–0 by Germany in the final. Daniela and teammates Marta, Cristiane and Rosana were nicknamed "the fantastic four".
