= India Trotter =

American soccer player (born 1985)

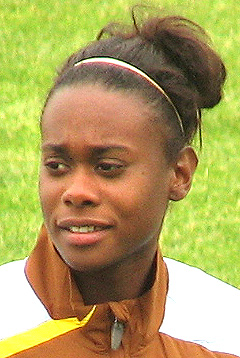

Personal information
- Full name: India Ashlei Trotter
- Date of birth: March 10, 1985 (age 41)
- Place of birth: Plantation, Florida, U.S.
- Height: 5 ft 9 in (1.75 m)
- Positions: Defender; midfielder; forward

Youth career
- 1994: St. Thomas Aquinas
- 1994–1998: Coral Springs
- 1998–2003: Team Boca

College career
Years	Team	Apps	(Gls)
2003–2006	Florida State Seminoles	97	(24)

Senior career*
Years	Team	Apps	(Gls)
2008	Pali Blues	5	(2)
2008	1. FFC Frankfurt	7	(1)
2010	Saint Louis Athletica	3	(0)
2010	Sky Blue FC	10	(0)
2011	Atlanta Beat	12	(0)
2011	Dalsjöfors GoIF	9	(1)

International career
2003–2004	United States U-19	2	(0)
2006–2007	United States	2	(0)

Managerial career
- 2010–2011: Syracuse Orange (volunteer assistant)
- 2012–2014: USC Upstate Spartans (assistant)
- * Club domestic league appearances and goals

India Ashlei Trotter (born March 10, 1985) is an American former professional soccer player. She played for Saint Louis Athletica, Sky Blue FC, and the Atlanta Beat of Women's Professional Soccer (WPS) and the United States women's national soccer team.

== Early life ==
Born in Plantation, Florida, Trotter was raised in Fort Lauderdale, where she attended St. Thomas Aquinas High School and was a standout soccer player. She was a three-year starter at St. Thomas Aquinas who scored 62 goals and recorded 47 assists. She earned All-Broward/Dade Team for three years. She was also named Freshman of the Year.

Trotter played club soccer for four years for three-time State Cup Champions, Team Boca. She was named the Nation's Cup Tournament MVP and was State Cup runners-up in 1997 with Coral Springs. Trotter was an Atlanta Cup winner in 2000, Orange Bowl finalist in 2002 and won the Florida State Cup in 1998 with the Coral Springs U-15 team.

=== Florida State University ===
Trotter graduated from Florida State University and helped put the Florida State Seminoles women's soccer program on the map. Trotter played at Florida State from 2003 to 2006. During her freshman season, she helped lead Florida State (17-8-1) to the NCAA Division I Final Four (College Cup) in December 2003. During the tournament, she ranked second on the squad in goals scored and fourth in points and assists.

== Playing career ==
=== Club ===
==== Pali Blues ====
After graduation, Trotter signed with the Pali Blues of the W-League on June 17, 2008. She left one month later in July 2008 after signing a two-year contract with 1.FFC Frankfurt.

==== FFC Frankfurt ====
After playing ten games and scoring one goal for FFC Frankfurt, Trotter announced her retirement from professional football on January 13, 2009. "I decided to pursue other passions that I have in life," Trotter said. "Soccer has done enormous things for me and allowed me to meet contacts and other lifelong friends." Her new priority, however, would be to complete her degree in media productions at Florida State and venture into the business world.

==== Saint Louis Athletica ====
Trotter was selected in the second round (14th overall pick) of the 2008 WPS General Draft by Saint Louis Athletica. She was the first player selected by St. Louis in the draft. On March 16, 2010, she was named to Saint Louis' 23 player roster. She made her first appearance for the club on April 25 against the Boston Breakers. She made three appearances for the Athletica playing a total of 34 minutes.

==== Sky Blue FC ====
On May 6, 2010 Trotter was traded to Sky Blue FC in return for Anita Asante. She started seven of the ten games that she played for Sky Blue for a total of 612 minutes.

==== Atlanta Beat ====
Trotter signed with the Atlanta Beat for the 2011 WPS season. She made six starts in twelve appearances, playing a total of 675 minutes for the squad.

==== Dalsjöfors GoIF ====
In 2011, Trotter signed with Swedish Damallsvenskan club, Dalsjöfors GoIF. She made nine starts in nine games played and scored one goal.

=== International ===
In 2006, Trotter made two appearances for the United States women's national soccer team. Her first was during the team's 3–1 win over Norway at the Four Nation's Tournament in China.

== Coaching career ==
Trotter served as assistant coach for the University of South Carolina Upstate women's soccer team during the 2012-13 season.
