= Stephanie Logterman =

American soccer player

Personal information
- Full name: Stephanie Lynn Logterman
- Date of birth: February 25, 1986 (age 40)
- Place of birth: Austin, Texas, United States
- Height: 5 ft 6 in (1.68 m)
- Position: Defender

College career
Years	Team	Apps	(Gls)
2005–2008	Texas Longhorns		

Senior career*
Years	Team	Apps	(Gls)
2007	Jersey Sky Blue	10	(0)
2009	Saint Louis Athletica	13	(0)

International career
2002	United States U-16		
2003	United States U-17		
2003–2004	United States U-19		
2006	United States U-20		
2007	United States U-21		
2008–2009	United States U-23	6	(0)
- * Club domestic league appearances and goals

Stephanie Lynn Logterman (born February 25, 1986) is an American former soccer defender who played for Saint Louis Athletica of Women's Professional Soccer, and was a member of the United States U-20 and U-23 women's national soccer teams.

Logterman retired in March 2010 in order to further her medical school studies, having received a scholarship grant that she felt she could not pass up.
