= Elise Addis =

American soccer player (born 1987)

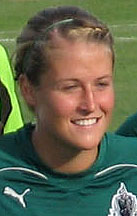

Personal information
- Full name: Elise Marie Addis
- Birth name: Elise Marie Weber
- Date of birth: July 26, 1987 (age 39)
- Place of birth: Elk Grove Village, Illinois, U.S.
- Height: 5 ft 6 in (1.68 m)
- Position: Defender

College career
Years	Team	Apps	(Gls)
2005–2006	Wisconsin Badgers	43	(8)
2007–2008	Notre Dame Fighting Irish	53	(4)

Senior career*
Years	Team	Apps	(Gls)
2009–2010	Saint Louis Athletica	18	(1)
2010	Chicago Red Stars (WPS)		
2011	Chicago Red Stars (WPSL)		
2012	Chicago Red Stars (WPSLE)		

International career
2007–2010	United States U-23		
- * Club domestic league appearances and goals

Elise Marie Addis (née Weber; born July 26, 1987) is an American soccer defender.

== Career ==
She played for Chicago Red Stars of WPSL Elite League and was a member of the United States U-23 women's national soccer team.
