= Erin Walter =

American soccer player

Personal information
- Date of birth: November 28, 1983 (age 42)
- Place of birth: Elk Grove Village, Illinois, U.S.
- Height: 5 ft 5 in (1.65 m)
- Position: Midfielder

College career
Years	Team	Apps	(Gls)
2002–2005	DePaul Blue Demons		

Senior career*
Years	Team	Apps	(Gls)
2006–2008	Chicago Gaels	32	(0)
2009	Saint Louis Athletica	6	(0)
- * Club domestic league appearances and goals as of 22:18, 30 September 2009 (UTC) ‡ National team caps and goals as of 22:18, 30 September 2009 (UTC)

Erin Walter (born November 28, 1983) is an American soccer midfielder who last played for Saint Louis Athletica of Women's Professional Soccer. She decided to retire due to hip injuries after two seasons with Saint Louis Athletica.
