= Kia McNeill =

American soccer player (born 1986)

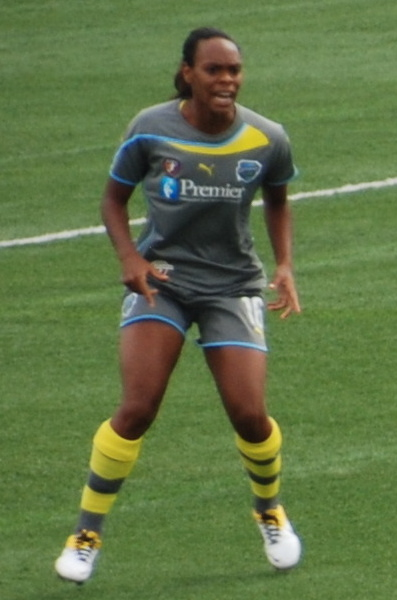

Personal information
- Full name: Kia Janeen McNeill
- Date of birth: May 15, 1986 (age 40)
- Place of birth: Avon, Connecticut, United States
- Height: 5 ft 9 in (1.75 m)
- Position: Defender

College career
Years	Team	Apps	(Gls)
2004–2007	Boston College Eagles		

Senior career*
Years	Team	Apps	(Gls)
2005	New England Mutiny		
2007	Bay State Select		
2008	Kristianstads DFF		
2009	Saint Louis Athletica	19	(0)
2010	Atlanta Beat	19	(0)
2011	Philadelphia Independence	17	(1)
2012	Rossiyanka	1	(0)
2013	Boston Breakers	21	(0)

International career
- United States U-19
- United States U-23

Managerial career
- 2016–: Brown Bears
- * Club domestic league appearances and goals

Kia Janeen McNeill (born May 15, 1986) is an American retired professional soccer defender who most recently played for the Boston Breakers in the NWSL. She previously played for the Saint Louis Athletica, Philadelphia Independence, and the Atlanta Beat in the WPS and was a member of the United States U-23 women's national soccer team.

== Early life ==
McNeill was born and grew up in Avon, Connecticut and attended Avon High School. At Avon, she helped lead the women's soccer team to three straight Class M State Championships and three undefeated seasons. She was named 2003 State Player of the Year in Connecticut and was a two-time NSCAA High School All-American. She also earned letters in basketball and track. In 2010, McNeill was inducted into the Connecticut Girls Soccer Coaches Association Hall of Fame.

=== Boston College ===
McNeill was a four-year starter and played in 86 consecutive games at Boston College. She was a forward for her first three seasons and switched her senior season to defender. As a team captain, McNeill was considered crucial to the Eagles defense as it was ranked sixth in the country in goals-against-average (0.475). She finished her career as the eighth all-time leading scorer at Boston with 61 career points. Her final collegiate statistics included 86 games played, 24 goals and 13 assists. McNeill was named Big East Rookie of the Year and earned All-Big East First Team selection honors. She was also named by Soccer Buzz Magazine as the Northeast Freshman of the Year.

== Playing career ==
=== Club ===
==== Kristianstads DFF ====
Two days after graduation at Boston College, McNeill flew to Sweden to begin her professional career as a member Kristianstads DFF in the Damallsvenskan.

==== St. Louis Athletica ====
McNeill was the ninth overall draft pick during the 2009 WPS Draft by the Saint Louis Athletica. During the 2009 WPS season, she appeared in 19 games for the Saint Louis Athletica, starting 17 times. She helped anchor a Saint Louis defense that allowed the second fewest goals in the WPS, the second fewest goals against average, and the second most shutouts.

==== Atlanta Beat (WPS) ====
In February 2010, McNeill was traded to the Atlanta Beat. She started all 19 games playing a total of 1624 minutes.

==== Philadelphia Independence (WPS) ====
During the 2011 WPS season, McNeill played for the expansion team, Philadelphia Independence. She started 17 of 17 games for a total of 1453 minutes and scored one goal.

==== Rossiyanka ====
After the WPS suspended operations in early 2012, McNeill made a small stint with Leigh Ann Robinson, Yael Averbuch, and Omolyn Davis playing for WFC Rossiyanka. She made one appearance, starting and playing the full ninety minutes.

==== Boston Breakers (NWSL) ====
In February 2013, it was announced that McNeill had signed with the Boston Breakers for the inaugural season of the National Women's Soccer League. She started 21 of the Breakers' 22 2013 regular-season games, but announced that she would miss the 2014 season in order to focus on school and coaching work.

=== International ===
McNeill appeared in two matches for the US U-23 Women's National Team in La Manga, Spain. She was previously part of the U-19 Women's national team player pool and scored four goals for the U-19 WNT at the World Cup Qualifying Tournament in Canada.
