= Saint Louis Athletica =

- Full name: Saint Louis Athletica
- Founded: 2008
- Dissolved: 2010
- Stadium: Anheuser-Busch Soccer Park
- Capacity: 6,200
- League: Women's Professional Soccer
- 2009: 2nd/7 (regular season); 3rd (playoffs)
Home colors	Away colors

Saint Louis Athletica was an American professional soccer club that was based in the Greater St. Louis area that participated in Women's Professional Soccer. Athletica started the 2009 season playing its home games at Ralph Korte Stadium, on the campus of SIUE in Edwardsville, Illinois, then moved to Soccer Park in Fenton, Missouri, in June. On May 27, 2010, the WPS announced that the club would fold effective immediately, forcing the league to compete with only 7 teams for the rest of the season.

Athletica was one of three parts of the Athletic Club of St. Louis, chaired by team owner Jeff Cooper, with the others being a large St. Louis youth soccer league network and the men's soccer team AC St. Louis.

== History ==
When the creation of WPS, a new top-flight women's league that would replace/revive the Women's United Soccer Association (WUSA), was announced in 2006, St. Louis was one of the then-six cities that would have a team.

On August 26, 2008, it was announced that the Saint Louis' head coach would be Jorge Barcellos, the then-head coach of the Brazilian women's team. Team Chairman Jeff Cooper's organization SLSU had plans for a soccer-specific stadium ready, but the construction would not start until St. Louis had been also awarded an MLS franchise.

On September 11, 2008, "St. Louis" was revealed as the official team name through an online video, along with a new team crest. The name and crest were further updated on November 25 unveiling "Saint Louis Athletica" as the new name.

=== Inaugural season ===
Athletica only played two preseason games, less than any other WPS team, and didn't play any other WPS team in those games. Athletica convincingly won both games, though: 7-2 versus the University of Missouri and 3-1 versus Notre Dame.

Athletica got off to a very slow start, being the only team with no points after the first two games and winless after the first four, despite usually outplaying their opponents; Athletica out-shot their opponents by more than twice, and frequently was in complete control during the first half of games. Despite this, Athletica was in last place or tied for last place in the league for the first two months of the season, even after they started winning. In the fourth game, Athletica lost what was assumed to be their star player, Brazilian Daniela, to a season-ending injury, and this combined with the slow start made many people write Athletica off.

However, Athletica went 10-4-2 the rest of the season, even better than the eventual season champions Los Angeles Sol during that same time period. Included in that impressive run was four consecutive away wins, which were largely responsible for propelling Athletica into second place in the league. Athletica only lost to two teams (Los Angeles and the Washington Freedom) for the rest of the season. The solid play came from USWNT players Lori Chalupny, Hope Solo, and Tina Ellertson, and breakout scoring force English international Eniola Aluko. Athletica ultimately clinched second two games before the regular season was over.

Athletica only got to play one playoff game, though, as they lost to #4 seed Sky Blue FC, a team they had beaten in all three of their meetings during the regular season. Athletica did not play well during the first half, which allowed Sky Blue to score, and while Athletica stepped up their game very well in the second half, they could not find the equalizer. Athletica has thus never come from behind to win or tie.

=== Second and final season ===
On May 27, 2010, team founder Jeff Cooper announced that the team was folding due to financial problems. The entire Athletica roster was entered into free agency on June 1, 2010.

== Name and colors ==
=== Name ===
While it was initially announced that the team name would be just "St. Louis" – with no moniker – the official name of the team was changed to "Saint Louis Athletica" two months later, still well before the inaugural season began. According to the official release on SLSU's website,

The word "Athletica", while not found in the English dictionary, is derived from the adjective "athletic", with the "a" denoting the newly created noun as feminine, a common practice in many foreign languages ... The word 'Athletica' denotes strength and power – characteristics of this organization that are epitomized by the crest, which also pays homage to St. Louis' roots", said Cooper. "Naming a professional sports franchise is no easy task, to say the least. With Athletica, we feel we have perfectly captured the essence of our team's identity in a name and crest that transcends cultures.

=== Crest ===
Originally, the crest used to represent the St. Louis Athletica was simply the same crest used by Cooper's organization St. Louis Soccer United, which is also presumed to be the crest that will be used if SLSU is awarded an MLS franchise as well. The crest resembled a medieval coat-of-arms, and featured a rendition of the statue Apotheosis of Saint Louis from outside the St. Louis art museum (as viewed from the left), a symbol frequently used to represent the city of St. Louis before the Gateway Arch was constructed. The crest also featured a fleur-de-lis, representing both the city's French heritage and the convergence of the three rivers in the area. The colors used were dark blue, two shades of green, and grey.

In the video citing "St. Louis" as the official team name, an entirely new crest was revealed. While the general shape and design were retained, the color scheme changed to just green and two shades of grey, the fleur-de-lis's position was replaced by 2009 and two fleur-de-lises were placed on either side of the crest, and Saint Louis was replaced by a Joan of Arc figure on horseback as viewed from the right, holding a flag up instead of a sword, the sword instead being at her hip. It also has what appear to be branches on each side of the coat-of-arms.

The final version of the Joan of Arc crest was not very different from the second version. Everything was retained except for the color scheme (replacing one shade of grey with the dark blue) and the 2009. Newly included was an "StL" on the flag with a bar under the 't', and the banner was extended to say "Saint Louis Athletica" with 'Athletica' centered.

Due to competitiveness in St. Louis youth soccer and the similarity between Athletica's logo and the logo used by SLSU's youth clubs, the Joan of Arc logo was phased out during the 2009–10 offseason, with the crown-and-sword crest that had been used as a secondary logo taking its place as Athletica's primary logo.

=== Uniforms ===
Athletica's uniforms for the 2009 season were revealed, along with those of all the current WPS team, were revealed on Tuesday, February 24 in New York City. The official WPS press release lists Athletica's colors as "USA Forest Green" and "Pace Grey". The kits for all teams were supplied by PUMA.

In both the home and away kits, the socks are grey and the shorts are green with grey stripes down the side. The tops for home and away are green and grey, respectively, with the WPS logo on the right shoulder sleeve. The Athletica crest appears on the left corner of the top and on the right leg of the shorts. The goalkeeper's jersey is expected to be hot pink. Athletica players will not have the option to wear the 'skorts' included in PUMA's kit design for games, along with the Red Stars and the Freedom.

==== Special occasions ====
On June 7, in honor of the Susan G. Komen Race for the Cure that was to happen in St. Louis the next week, Athletica wore kits with white tops and socks and pink shorts instead of their normal green tops and shorts and grey socks. The game ball was also two shades of pink instead of the regular white with green stripes.

== Players ==
=== Most recent roster ===
Note: Flags indicate national team as defined under FIFA eligibility rules; some limited exceptions apply. Players may hold more than one non-FIFA nationality.

No.	Pos.	Nation	Player
1	GK	USA	Hope Solo
2	MF	BRA	Elaine
3	MF	USA	Carolyn Blank
4	MF	USA	Kendall Fletcher
5	MF	USA	Lindsay Tarpley
6	MF	JPN	Aya Miyama
7	MF	USA	Shannon Boxx
8	DF	USA	Tina Ellertson
9	FW	ENG	Eniola Aluko
11	DF	ENG	Anita Asante
12	DF	USA	Elise Weber

No.	Pos.	Nation	Player
13	MF	USA	Sarah Teegarden
16	MF	USA	Erin Walter
17	MF	USA	Lori Chalupny (captain)
18	GK	USA	Ashlyn Harris
19	FW	SWE	Madelaine Edlund
20	FW	USA	Kristina Larsen
21	DF	USA	Niki Cross
23	MF	MEX	Verónica Pérez
22	DF	USA	Sarah Wagenfuhr
25	MF	USA	Tina DiMartino
61	GK	USA	Kati Jo Spisak

=== Other notable former players ===
The following former players have played at the international level:

- #2 (United States) FW Kerri Hanks (2009)
- #3 (United States) DF Stephanie Logterman (2009)
- #4 (Sweden) DF Sara Larsson (2009)
- #13 (United States) GK Jillian Loyden (2009)
- #14 (Canada) DF Melissa Tancredi (2009)
- #16 (United States) DF Kia McNeal (2009)
- #21 (Brazil) MF Francielle (2009)
- #21 (Australia) FW Sarah Walsh (2009)

== Home stadiums ==
- Korte Stadium at SIU Edwardsville (2009)
- Hermann Stadium at SLU (2009-) select games only
- Soccer Park in Fenton, Missouri (2009–2010)
- Collinsville Soccer Complex (proposed)

The St. Louis Athletica began play in at Ralph Korte Stadium on the campus of SIUE. The hope was that the Athletica would eventually have been co-tenants of the 18,500-seat main stadium of the Collinsville Soccer Complex, but construction on that facility was dependent upon Major League Soccer awarding a franchise to Cooper's group, which has yet to occur. The complex would be ten minutes from downtown St. Louis, at the I-255/I-70 interchange.

The stadium at SIUE is roughly 20 minutes northeast of downtown. The stadium officially holds 3,000 spectators, though SLSU added bleachers so that there could be 5,000 at a game, which was met for the inaugural game against Chicago. There were five different types of seating sections by tickets available.

After AB InBev gave the Fenton, Missouri stadium Anheuser-Busch Center, also known as "Soccer Park", to Cooper's organization in early 2009, rumors of Athletica moving there began to surface. These were vindicated on May 21, when the Athletica front office sent out an e-mail to all season ticket holders notifying them of the move, to start with the June 7th game against Sky Blue FC. Soccer Park is located just west of the I-270/I-44 interchange, ten to fifteen minutes from downtown St. Louis.

== Supporter's groups ==
In November 2008, well before the season started, a student at SIUE began organizing a supporter's group through websites like BigSoccer, Facebook, and MySpace. After a member poll, the group named itself Laclede's Army after Laclede's Landing and its namesake Pierre Laclede. They pride themselves on chanting, drumming, and singing for their team. It welcomes anyone who wants to join to sit with them. At SIUE, Laclede's Army sat behind the north-end goal; at Soccer Park, Laclede's Army sits in section 20 at the northeast corner of the stadium. Laclede's Army was present at the very first WPS draft in St. Louis and at all WPS functions in the St. Louis area. Laclede's Army site

Also present at the Athletica games is Verde Azul, a group of supporters from the Latin drum group Sambaborn. They also sat goal-line at SIUE by Laclede's Army. At Soccer Park, Verde Azul performs from section 8 on the southeast corner of the stadium.

River City Saints (RCS) was established in the summer of 2007 as a small collection of supporters for the St. Louis Lions organization. In 2008, during the building of the Women's Professional Soccer league, the RCS moved its efforts to a united supporter's front for all area soccer in and around St. Louis. In March 2009 The RCS attended St. Louis Athletica's Missouri Kick-Off Meet and Greet at the Scott Gallagher Soccer Training Complex in Maryland Heights, Missouri. The RCS continued their penchant for "D.I.Y." marketing and promoted the St. Louis Soccer United brand wherever and whenever possible, with both fliers, word of mouth and online advertising. The RCS co-exist as an all-area supporters group with the Eads Brigade (AC St. Louis supporters) and Laclede's Army (St. Louis Athletica supporters).

== Records and statistics ==
List of seasons
Year	League								Playoffs	Top goalscorer
Year	P	W	D	L	GF	GA	GD	Pos	Playoffs	Top goalscorer
2009	20	10	4	6	19	15	+4	2nd	Lost Super Semifinal	(England) Eniola Aluko (4)
2010	6	2	3	1	9	8	+1	N/A	Did not qualify	(England) Eniola Aluko (2) (Finland) Laura Österberg Kalmari (2)

All-time head-to-head record
Club	Pld	W	L	D	GF	GA	GD	PPG	First game	Most recent game
Atlanta Beat	0	0	0	0	0	0	0	0.00	-	-
Boston Breakers	4	2	1	1	3	3	0	1.75	2009 April 11, 0–2; Harvard Stadium	2010 April 25, 1–1; Soccer Park
Chicago Red Stars	4	2	1	1	5	2	3	1.75	2009 April 4, 0–1; Ralph Korte Stadium	2010 April 17, 1–1; Toyota Park
FC Gold Pride	5	3	0	2	6	2	4	1.80	2009 May 9, 1–0; Ralph Korte Stadium	2010 April 11, 2–0; Soccer Park
Los Angeles Sol	4	1	2	1	2	4	−2	1.00	2009 April 25, 0–0; Robert Hermann Stadium	2009 July 8, 1–0; Home Depot Center
Philadelphia Independence	1	1	0	0	2	1	−1	3.00	2010 May 8, 2–1; Soccer Park	2010 May 8, 2–1; Soccer Park
Sky Blue FC	5	3	1	1	6	4	2	2.00	2009 July 22, 1–0; Soccer Park	2010 May, 2–2; Soccer Park
Washington Freedom	4	0	3	1	4	8	−4	0.25	2009 May 3, 3–3; Maryland SoccerPlex	2010 May 1, 1–3; RKF Stadium
Total	27	12	8	7	28	24	4	1.59	–	–

Player statistics

Games

- 1. Tina Ellertson – 21
- 2. Kia McNeill – 20
- 3. Eniola Aluko – 19
- 3. Lori Chalupny – 19
- 3. Elise Weber – 19
- 3. Angie Woznuk – 19

Starts

- 1. Tina Ellertson – 21
- 2. Lori Chalupny – 19
- 2. Angie Woznuk – 19
- 4. Kia McNeill – 18
- 4. Hope Solo – 18

Minutes

- 1. Tina Ellertson – 1838
- 2. Lori Chalupny – 1665
- 3. Angie Woznuk – 1637
- 4. Hope Solo – 1620
- 5. Eniola Aluko – 1503

Goals

- 1. Eniola Aluko – 6
- 2. Christie Welsh – 3
- 3. Lori Chalupny – 2
- 3. Amanda Cinalli – 2
- 3. Daniela – 2

Game-winning goals

- 1. Eniola Aluko – 3
- 2. Lori Chalupny – 2
- 2. Amanda Cinalli – 2
- 4. Elise Weber – 1
- 4. Christie Welsh – 1

Shots

- 1. Eniola Aluko – 50
- 2. Lori Chalupny – 35
- 3.
- 4.
- 5.

Shots on goal

- 1. Eniola Aluko – 26
- 2. Lori Chalupny – 19
- 3.
- 4.
- 5.

Assists

- 1. Eniola Aluko – 4
- 2. Kendall Fletcher – 3
- 3. Melissa Tancredi – 2
- 3. Sarah Walsh – 2

GAA (270+ min)

- 1. Jillian Lyoden – 0.33
- 2. Hope Solo – 0.82

Shutouts

- 1. Hope Solo – 7
- 2. Jillian Loyden – 2

Saves

- 1. Hope Solo – 84
- 2. Jillian Loyden – 16

Wins

- 1. Hope Solo
- 2. Jillian Loyden

== See also ==
- Women's Professional Soccer
- AC St. Louis
- Soccer in St. Louis
- National Women's Soccer League
