= Atlanta Beat (WPS) =

American soccer club

- Full name: Atlanta Beat
- Nickname: Beat
- Founded: 2009
- Stadium: KSU Soccer Stadium
- Capacity: 8,300
- Owner: (United States) Fitz Johnson
- General manager: (United States) Shawn McGee
- Head coach: James Galanis
- League: Women's Professional Soccer
Home colors	Away colors

The Atlanta Beat was an American soccer club based in Metro Atlanta that competed on a professional level. The team joined Women's Professional Soccer as an expansion team in 2010, and played its home games at Kennesaw State University Soccer Stadium, the result of a public-private partnership between the team and Kennesaw State University. The club took the name and logo of the former Atlanta Beat (WUSA) of the defunct Women's United Soccer Association.

== History ==
=== Name and colors ===
The team's name was announced to be the Beat on June 18, 2009. The name was determined by a fan poll, with Attack, Beat, and Storm as the options.

The new Beat logo was the same design as the previous WUSA logo, with the two shades of blue being replaced by Gold and Ferrari Red.

=== Building the team ===
Atlanta began building its team at the 2009 WPS Expansion Draft on September 15, 2009, where it selected six players from the existing seven WPS teams, getting four players from the teams that finished first and second in the league's inaugural season. A week later, Atlanta selected five international players in the 2009 WPS International Draft, including three players from Umea IK, and thus now have exclusive negotiating rights to those players among WPS teams.

=== Inaugural season ===
The Beat ended the 2010 season in last place with 5 wins, 13 losses, and 6 ties.

=== 2011 season ===
The Atlanta Beat started off the 2011 season on April 9 in a game against the Boston Breakers in front of over slightly 4,000 spectators at KLS Stadium. The Beat lost 1–4 to Boston with their lone goal coming from Carli Lloyd in a penalty kick in the 78th minute.

== Players ==
=== 2011 roster ===
Note: Flags indicate national team as defined under FIFA eligibility rules; some limited exceptions apply. Players may hold more than one non-FIFA nationality.

No.	Pos.	Nation	Player
—	DF	USA	Katherine Reynolds
—	MF	USA	India Trotter
—	MF	USA	Lori Chalupny
—	DF	USA	Keeley Dowling
—	DF	USA	Cat Whitehill
—	DF	USA	Heather Mitts
—	DF	USA	Kia McNeill
—	FW	CAN	Lauren Sesselmann
—	MF	USA	Carli Lloyd
—	GK	USA	Allison Lipsher
—	MF	USA	Angela Salem
—	MF	USA	Colleen Flanagan

No.	Pos.	Nation	Player
—	DF	USA	Megan Jesolva
—	MF	USA	Julianne Sitch
—	FW	USA	Meghan Lenczyk
—	MF	USA	Kacey White
—	MF	USA	Kylie Wright
—	GK	USA	Katie Fraine
—	FW	USA	Katie Bethke
—	GK	USA	Allison Whitworth
—	FW	USA	Analisa Marquez
—	MF	CAN	Kelly Parker
—	MF	USA	Lyndsey Patterson
—	MF	USA	Bianca D'Agostino

=== League suspension ===
On January 30, 2012, Women's Professional Soccer announced suspension of the 2012 season, citing several internal organization struggles as the primary cause. Some of these included an ongoing legal battle with an ex-franchise owner and the lack of resources invested into the league.

== See also ==
- Atlanta Beat (WUSA)
