= 2010 Chicago Red Stars season =

Chicago Red Stars
2010 season
- Chairman: Emma Hayes
- Manager: Marcia McDermott
- Stadium: Toyota Park
- Women's Professional Soccer: 6th
- Top goalscorer: Ella Masar (8)
- Highest home attendance: 6,089 (vs. FC Gold Pride)
- Lowest home attendance: 2,173 (vs. Philadelphia)
- Average home league attendance: 4,025
- Biggest win: 2-0 (May 1 at Boston, July 10 vs. Sky Blue FC, Sept. 1 vs. Philadelphia)
- Biggest defeat: 0-3 (July 28 at Philadelphia)
Home colors	Away colors
- All statistics correct as of June 14, 2017.

The 2010 Chicago Red Stars season was the second season of the soccer club and its second season in the Women's Professional Soccer league.

== Major events ==
=== Team news ===
For the 2010 season the Red Stars returned nine of their original 22 players from 2009.

After the 2010 season, the Red Stars could not come up with the security bond for Women's Professional Soccer. On December 13, 2010, the Red Stars informed its fans that they would not be able to return for the 2011 WPS season.

== Squad ==
=== First-team squad ===
As of July 30, 2010.

Note: Flags indicate national team as defined under FIFA eligibility rules; some limited exceptions apply. Players may hold more than one non-FIFA nationality.

No.	Pos.	Nation	Player
1	GK	USA	Jillian Loyden
2	DF	USA	Marian Dalmy
3	FW	USA	Ella Masar
5	DF	ENG	Anita Asante
7	MF	USA	Megan Rapinoe
8	MF	BRA	Formiga
9	DF	USA	Whitney Engen
10	MF	SWE	Kosovare Asllani
11	FW	BRA	Cristiane
12	DF	USA	Elise Weber
13	DF	USA	Natalie Spilger
14	FW	ENG	Karen Carney

No.	Pos.	Nation	Player
15	DF	USA	Kate Markgraf
16	MF	USA	Sophie Reiser
17	MF	ENG	Katie Chapman
18	GK	USA	Kelsey Davis
21	DF	USA	Lydia Vandenbergh
22	FW	USA	Jessica McDonald
23	GK	USA	Meghann Burke
26	FW	USA	Nikki Washington
27	FW	USA	Casey Nogueira
31	GK	USA	Allison Whitworth
38	DF	USA	Julianne Sitch

=== Transfers ===
==== In ====
Note: Flags indicate national team as defined under FIFA eligibility rules; some limited exceptions apply. Players may hold more than one non-FIFA nationality.

No.	Pos.	Nation	Player
8	MF	BRA	Formiga
9	DF	USA	Whitney Engen
17	MF	USA	Katie Chapman
19	FW	IRL	Michele Weissenhofer
25	MF	USA	Jackie Santacaterina
27	FW	USA	Casey Nogueira
38	DF	USA	Julianne Sitch
1	GK	USA	Jillian Loyden
10	MF	SWE	Kosovare Asllani

No.	Pos.	Nation	Player
18	GK	USA	Kelsey Davis
20	DF	USA	Lydia Vandenbergh
23	FW	USA	Jessica McDonald
25	GK	AUS	Meghann Burke
5	DF	ENG	Anita Asante
16	MF	USA	Sophie Reiser
12	DF	USA	Elise Weber
26	FW	USA	Nikki Washington
31	GK	USA	Allison Whitworth

==== Out ====
Note: Flags indicate national team as defined under FIFA eligibility rules; some limited exceptions apply. Players may hold more than one non-FIFA nationality.

No.	Pos.	Nation	Player
1	GK	SWE	Caroline Jönsson
5	FW	USA	Lindsay Tarpley
10	MF	USA	Carli Lloyd
15	DF	USA	Bonnie Young
17	DF	USA	Michelle Wenino
19	DF	IRL	Mary Therese McDonnell
7	MF	AUS	Heather Garriock
9	FW	USA	Danesha Adams
12	MF	USA	Chioma Igwe

No.	Pos.	Nation	Player
16	DF	USA	Sarah Wagenfuhr
18	MF	SWE	Frida Östberg
20	GK	USA	Jaimel Johnson
23	DF	USA	Nikki Krzysik
25	GK	AUS	Lydia Williams
4	MF	SCO	Ifeoma Dieke
6	MF	USA	Brittany Klein
19	FW	IRL	Michele Weissenhofer
25	MF	USA	Jackie Santacaterina

== Club ==
=== Management ===
Emma Hayes started the season as the head coach, but she was fired on May 10. Marcia McDermott served in the position on an interim basis, during which the team beat the top of the table FC Gold Pride 1–0. Omid Namazi was hired in the beginning of June.

Position	Staff
Technical Director	(England) Emma Hayes
Manager	(England) Emma Hayes
Assistant manager	(United States) Denise Reddy
Assistant manager	(United States) Nathan Kipp
Assistant manager	
Head athletic trainer	(United States) Laura Behr
Assistant athletic trainer	
Equipment manager	

Last updated: May 5, 2010
Source: http://chicagoredstars.com/history/

== Competitions ==
=== Women's Professional Soccer ===
==== Standings ====
Blue denotes team has clinched regular season championship.
Green denotes team has spot in 2010 Women's Professional Soccer Playoffs.

Place	Team	GP	W	L	T	GF	GA	GD	Points
1	FC Gold Pride	24	16	3	5	46	19	+27	53
2	Boston Breakers	24	10	8	6	36	28	+8	36
3	Philadelphia Independence	24	10	10	4	37	36	+1	34
4	Washington Freedom	24	8	9	7	33	33	0	31
5	Sky Blue FC	24	7	10	7	20	31	-11	28
6	Chicago Red Stars	24	7	11	6	21	27	-6	27
7	Atlanta Beat	24	5	13	6	20	40	-20	21

==== Results summary ====
- Games played against the Saint Louis Athletica before they folded still counted toward a team's point total.

Abbreviation and Color Key: Atlanta Beat – ATL • Boston Breakers – BOS • Chicago Red Stars – CHI • FC Gold Pride – BAY Philadelphia Independence – PHI • Saint Louis Athletica – STL • Sky Blue FC – NJ • Washington Freedom – WSH Win • Loss • Tie • Home
Club	Match																							
Club	1	2	3	4	5	6	7	8	9	10	11	12	13	14	15	16	17	18	19	20	21	22	23	24
Chicago Red Stars	NJ	STL	NJ	BOS	BAY	PHI	BAY	ATL	WSH	ATL	BOS	WSH	ATL	NJ	ATL	BOS	PHI	NJ	BAY	PHI	WAS	BAY	PHI	WAS
Chicago Red Stars	1-0	1-1	0-1	0-2	2-0	0-1	1-0	0-0	2-2	1-0	1-2	0-0	1-1	2-0	1-0	1-3	3-0	1-2	0-0	1-2	2-0	2-3	2-0	2-1

== Matches ==
Win Tie Loss

=== WPS regular season ===
April 11, 2010	Sky Blue FC	1–0	Chicago Red Stars	Piscataway, New Jersey
	Kai 7' (O'Reilly)	Report		Stadium: Yurcak Stadium; Attendance: 4,440; Referee: Ted Unkel

April 17, 2010	Chicago Red Stars	1–1	Saint Louis Athletica	Bridgeview, Illinois
	Nogueira 59' (Chapman)	Report	Chalupny 4'; Elaine (yellow card) 27'; Boxx (yellow card) 73'	Stadium: Toyota Park; Attendance: 5,134; Referee: Kari Seitz

April 25, 2010	Chicago Red Stars	0–1	Sky Blue FC	Bridgeview, Illinois
	Lloyd (yellow card) 18'	Report	Kai 52' (White)	Stadium: Toyota Park; Attendance: 3,136; Referee: Margaret Domka

May 1, 2010	Boston Breakers	0–2	Chicago Red Stars	Allston, Massachusetts
		Report	Rapinoe (yellow card) 32'; Nogueira 64' (Carney); Cristiane 70' (Rapinoe)	Stadium: Harvard Stadium; Attendance: 5,180; Referee: Jennifer Bennett

May 8, 2010	FC Gold Pride	2–0	Chicago Red Stars	Santa Clara, California
	Milbrett 45+'; O'Hara 78' (Yokers)	Report	Rapinoe (yellow card) 21'; Dieke (red card) 26'	Stadium: BuckShaw Stadium; Attendance: 3,153; Referee: Marlene Duffy

May 15, 2010	Chicago Red Stars	0–1	Philadelphia Independence	Bridgeview, Illinois
	Formiga (yellow card) 83'	Report	Lohman 7' (Rodriguez)	Stadium: Toyota Park; Attendance: 5,645; Referee: Tony Crush

May 29, 2010	Chicago Red Stars	1–0	FC Gold Pride	Bridgeview, Illinois
	Asllani 55' (Dalmy)	Report	Dew (yellow card) 41'	Stadium: Toyota Park; Attendance: 3,845; Referee: Jose Carlos Rivero

June 6, 2010	Chicago Red Stars	0–0	Atlanta Beat	Bridgeview, Illinois
	Weber (yellow card) 90+'	Report		Stadium: Toyota Park; Attendance: 4,227; Referee: Daniel Fitzgerald

June 12, 2010	Washington Freedom	2–2	Chicago Red Stars	Boyds, Maryland
	Wambach 11' (Whitehill); Sawa 18' (Bompastor); Bompastor (yellow card) 70'	Report	Cristiane 30' (Carney); Rapinoe (yellow card) 36'; Spilger (yellow card) 79'; Cristiane 82' (Nogueira); Spilger (yellow card) 90+' (yellow-red card)	Stadium: Maryland SoccerPlex; Attendance: 3,249; Referee: Felisha Mariscal

June 19, 2010	Atlanta Beat	1–0	Chicago Red Stars	Kennesaw, Georgia
	Ellertson 41' (Ocampo)	Report		Stadium: KSU Stadium; Attendance: 3,589

June 25, 2010	Boston Breakers	1–2	Chicago Red Stars	Allston, Massachusetts
	Fabiana 46' (del Rio)	Report	Masar 13' (Cristiane); Masar 79' (Dalmy)	Stadium: Harvard Stadium; Attendance: 3,647; Referee: Jennifer Bennett

July 4, 2010	Washington Freedom	0–0	Chicago Red Stars	Boyds, Maryland
		Report		Stadium: Maryland SoccerPlex; Attendance: 3,744; Referee: Tony Crush

July 7, 2010	Chicago Red Stars	1–1	Atlanta Beat	Bridgeview, Illinois
	Masar 42' (Cristiane); Chapman (yellow card) 61'	Report	Rasmussen 30'; Miyama (yellow card) 31'; Cinalli (yellow card) 90+'	Stadium: Toyota Park; Attendance: 3,091; Referee: Daniel Fitzgerald

July 10, 2010	Chicago Red Stars	2–0	Sky Blue FC	Bridgeview, Illinois
	Masar 38' (Spilger); Koster 47' (o.g.)	Report		Stadium: Toyota Park; Attendance: 4,064; Referee: Felisha Mariscal

July 21, 2010	Atlanta Beat	1–0	Chicago Red Stars	Kennesaw, Georgia
	Aluko 56' (Bishop); Blank (yellow card) 79'; Aluko (yellow card) 90+'	Report		Stadium: KSU Stadium; Attendance: 3,214; Referee: Michael Donovan

July 25, 2010	Chicago Red Stars	1–3	Boston Breakers	Bridgeview, Illinois
	Asllani 80' (Nogueira)	Report	Smith 9' (Cheney); Smith 12' (Tarpley); Dieke 14' (Smith)	Stadium: Toyota Park; Attendance: 3,673; Referee: Allan Chapman

July 28, 2010	Philadelphia Independence	3–0	Chicago Red Stars	Chester, Pennsylvania
	Rodriguez 12' (Lindsey); Rodrigue 25' (Falk); Buczkowski (yellow card) 48'; Seger 56' (Rodriguez); Magnusdottir (red card) 90+'	Report	Markgraf (yellow card) 81'	Stadium: John A. Farrell Stadium; Attendance: 2,053; Referee: Daniel Fitzgerald

August 1, 2010	Sky Blue FC	1–2	Chicago Red Stars	Piscataway, New Jersey
	Taylor 90+' (Kai)	Report	Masar 4' (Rapinoe); Carney 61' (Dalmy)	Stadium: Yurcak Field; Attendance: 3,539; Referee: Daniel Radford

August 7, 2010	FC Gold Pride	0–0	Chicago Red Stars	Hayward, California
	Wilson (yellow card) 62'; O'Hara (yellow card) 85'	Report		Stadium: Pioneer Stadium; Attendance: 2,470; Referee: Ted Unkel

August 11, 2010	Chicago Red Stars	1–2	Philadelphia Independence	Bridgeview, Illinois
	Formiga (yellow card) 37'; Masar 62' (Nogueira); Rapinoe (yellow card) 67'; Spilger (yellow card) 77'; Chapman (yellow card) 90+'	Report	Rodriguez 53' (Lindsey); Sanderson 78'	Stadium: Toyota Park; Attendance: 3,152; Referee: Jose Carlos Rivero

August 19, 2010	Washington Freedom	2–0	Chicago Red Stars	Boyds, Maryland
	Wambach 49' (Huffman); Whitehill 55' (Huffman)	Report		Stadium: Maryland SoccerPlex; Attendance: 2,511; Referee: Jose Carlos Rivero

August 22, 2010	Chicago Red Stars	2–3	FC Gold Pride	Bridgeview, Illinois
	Masar 18'; Formiga (yellow card) 45+'; Masar 61' (Dalmy)	Report	Marta 8' (Riley); Buehler 33' (Milbrett); Marta (yellow card) 43'; Marta 79' (penalty)	Stadium: Toyota Park; Attendance: 6,089; Referee: Michael Donovan

September 1, 2010	Chicago Red Stars	2–0	Philadelphia Independence	Bridgeview, Illinois
19:00	Boquete 4' (Nogueira); Chapman (yellow card) 36'; Dalmy 54' (Carney)	Report	Seger (yellow card) 77'	Stadium: Toyota Park; Attendance: 2,173; Referee: Moo Hackett

September 5, 2010	Chicago Red Stars	2–1	Washington Freedom	Bridgeview, Illinois
17:00	Nogueira 50' (Boquete); Formiga (yellow card) 86'; Rapinoe 90+' (Boquete)	Report	Bock (yellow card) 74'; Huffman (yellow card) 66' (yellow-red card) 87'; Goebel 90+'	Stadium: Toyota Park; Attendance: 4,067; Referee: Ted Unkel

== Statistics ==
=== Golden Boot ===
Rank	Scorer	G	A
1	(United States) Ella Masar	8	0
2	(Brazil) Cristiane	3	2
3	(United States) Casey Nogueira	2	3
4	(United States) Marian Dalmy	0	4

Source: womensprosoccer.com

=== Other information ===
Chairman	(United States) Marcia McDermott
Ground (capacity and dimensions)	Toyota Park (20,000 / N/A)

Source: http://chicagoredstars.com/history/
