= 2011 Chicago Red Stars season =

Chicago Red Stars
2011 season
- Owner: Arnim Whisler
- Chairman: Alyse LaHue
- Manager: Rory Dames
- WPSL: 1st in Group
- WPSL Cup: 2nd
Home colors	Away colors

The 2011 Chicago Red Stars season was the club's third season, and the only season it competed in the Women's Premier Soccer League.

== Major events ==
After the 2010 season, the Red Stars could not afford the Women's Professional Soccer league's security bond, and on April 7, 2011, the club announced that it could not return for the 2011 WPS season.

To continue the brand name the team dropped down one level to the Women's Premier Soccer League (WPSL) to continue playing for the 2011 season with hope of returning to WPS in 2012.

== Squad ==
=== First-team squad ===
As of September 5, 2011.

Note: Flags indicate national team as defined under FIFA eligibility rules; some limited exceptions apply. Players may hold more than one non-FIFA nationality.

No.	Pos.	Nation	Player
1	GK	(United States) USA	Jamie Forbes
2	MF	(United States) USA	Carly Samp
3	MF	(United States) USA	Kara Kabellis
4	MF	(United States) USA	Brianne Rodriguez
5	MF	(United States) USA	Amanda Cinalli
6	DF	(United States) USA	Julie Ewing
7	DF	(United States) USA	Elise Weber
8	DF	(United States) USA	Sammy Scofield
9	DF	(United States) USA	Megan Oyster
10	MF	(United States) USA	Shayla Mutz
11	FW	(United States) USA	Michele Weissenhofer
12	GK	(United States) USA	Taylor Vancil

No.	Pos.	Nation	Player
14	DF	(United States) USA	Heather Marik
15	DF	(United States) USA	Katie Uyenishi
16	DF	(United States) USA	Kecia Morway
17	MF	(United States) USA	Katie Nasenbenny
18	DF	(United States) USA	Jackie Santacaterina
19	MF	(United States) USA	Vanessa Laxgang
20	MF	(United States) USA	Vanessa DiBernardo
21	MF	(United States) USA	Niki Sebo
22	DF	(United States) USA	Leigh Jakes
23	DF	(Republic of Ireland) IRL	Shannon McDonnell
—		(United States) USA	Carissa Miller
—		(United States) USA	Erin Dees

=== Transfers ===
==== In ====
Note: Flags indicate national team as defined under FIFA eligibility rules; some limited exceptions apply. Players may hold more than one non-FIFA nationality.

No.	Pos.	Nation	Player
—	FW	(United States) USA	Amanda Cinalli
—	GK	(United States) USA	Elise Weber
—	MF	(United States) USA	Vanessa DiBernardo
—		(United States) USA	Julie Ewing
—		(United States) USA	Kara Kabellis
—		(United States) USA	Shayla Mutz
—		(United States) USA	Katie Nasenbenny
—		(United States) USA	Vanessa Laxgang
—		(United States) USA	Carly Samp
—		(United States) USA	Sammy Scofield
—		(United States) USA	Brianne Rodriguez

No.	Pos.	Nation	Player
—		(Republic of Ireland) IRL	Shannon McDonnell
—		(United States) USA	Leigh Jakes
—		(United States) USA	Katie Uyenishi
—		(United States) USA	Jamie Forbes
—		(United States) USA	Kecia Morway
—		(United States) USA	Megan Oyster
—		(United States) USA	Nicole Sebo
—		(United States) USA	Carissa Miller
—		(United States) USA	Erin Dees
—		(United States) USA	Taylor Vancil

==== Out ====
Note: Flags indicate national team as defined under FIFA eligibility rules; some limited exceptions apply. Players may hold more than one non-FIFA nationality.

No.	Pos.	Nation	Player
1	GK	(United States) USA	Jillian Loyden
2	DF	(United States) USA	Marian Dalmy
3	FW	(United States) USA	Ella Masar
4	MF	(Scotland) SCO	Ifeoma Dieke
6	MF	(United States) USA	Brittany Klein
7	MF	(United States) USA	Megan Rapinoe
8	MF	(Brazil) BRA	Formiga
9	DF	(United States) USA	Whitney Engen
10	MF	(Sweden) SWE	Kosovare Asllani
11	FW	(Brazil) BRA	Cristiane

No.	Pos.	Nation	Player
13	DF	(United States) USA	Natalie Spilger
14	FW	(England) ENG	Karen Carney
15	DF	(United States) USA	Kate Markgraf
17	MF	(England) ENG	Katie Chapman
18	GK	(United States) USA	Kelsey Davis
21	DF	(United States) USA	Lydia Vandenbergh
22	FW	(United States) USA	Jessica McDonald
23	GK	(United States) USA	Meghann Burke
27	FW	(United States) USA	Casey Nogueira
38	DF	(United States) USA	Julianne Sitch

== Club ==
=== Management ===
Position	Staff
Manager	(United States) Rory Dames

Last updated: May 5, 2010

== Competitions ==
=== Midwest Conference ===
==== North Division ====
Place	Team	P	W	L	T	GF	GA	GD	Points
1	Chicago Red Stars	9	8	1	0	35	3	32	24
2	FC Milwaukee Nationals	10	7	2	1	28	9	19	22
3	Chicago Eclipse Select	9	3	3	3	17	14	3	12
4	Minnesota Kings FC	10	3	6	1	9	30	-21	10
5	Madison 56ers	10	2	6	2	11	24	-13	8
6	Iowa Rush	10	2	7	1	10	29	-19	7

== Matches ==
Win Tie Loss Void

=== WPSL regular season ===
June 1, 2011	Minnesota Kings FC	1–0	Chicago Red Stars	St. Michael, Minnesota
18:00 CDT (UTC-05)		[ Report]		Stadium: Community Education Field

June 16, 2011	Chicago Red Stars	2–0	FC Milwaukee Nationals	Lisle, Illinois
16:30 CDT (UTC-05)	DiBernardo 20'; Mutz ?'	Report		Stadium: Village of Lisle-Benedictine University Sports Complex

June 22, 2011	Madison 56ers	1–3	Chicago Red Stars	Madison, Wisconsin
18:00 CDT (UTC-05)	Holmes ?' (pen.)	WPSL Report; Report	Weissenhofer ?', ?'; Ewing ?'	Stadium: Breese Stevens Field

June 29, 2011	Chicago Red Stars	4–0	Madison 56ers	Lisle, Illinois
18:00 CDT (UTC-05)	Weissenhofer ?', 47'; Cinalli ?', 83'	WPSL Report		Stadium: Village of Lisle-Benedictine University Sports Complex

June 30, 2011	FC Milwaukee Nationals	2–4	Chicago Red Stars	FC Milwaukee Field
18:00 CDT (UTC-05)	Hagan 3' (pen.), ?'	Report	DiBernardo ?'; Kabellis ?' (pen.), ?' (pen.); Scofield ?'

July 2, 2011	Chicago Red Stars	5–0	Iowa Rush	Lisle, Illinois
17:15 CDT (UTC-05)	Cinalli 9', 81'; Ewing 28'; Santacaterina 52'; Nasenbenny 72'	WPSL Report		Stadium: Village of Lisle-Benedictine University Sports Complex

July 3, 2011	Chicago Eclipse Select	0–3	Chicago Red Stars
16:15 CDT (UTC-05)		[ Report]

July 9, 2011	Iowa Rush	0–5	Chicago Red Stars
17:15 CDT (UTC-05)		Report	Weissenhofer ?'; DiBernardo ?'; Kabellis ?'; Nasenbenny ?'; Laxgang ?'

July 10, 2011	Chicago Red Stars	9–0	Minnesota Kings FC	Lisle, Illinois
18:00 CDT (UTC-05)	Samp 1'; Ewing 19'; DiBernardo 22'; Cinalli 25', 36'; Kabellis 55'; Mutz 56', 73'; Laxgang 75'	Report		Stadium: Village of Lisle-Benedictine University Sports Complex

July 12, 2011	Chicago Red Stars	canceled	Chicago Eclipse Select	Lisle, Illinois
18:00 CDT (UTC-05)		Report		Stadium: Village of Lisle-Benedictine University Sports Complex

=== WPSL playoffs ===
July 16, 2011 Midwest Semi-finals	F.C. Indiana	0–4	Chicago Red Stars	Dublin, Ohio
		Report	Cinalli 2', 79'; Ewing 20'; Weissenhofer 24'	Stadium: Dublin Jerome High School

July 17, 2011 Midwest Finals	FC Milwaukee Nationals	0–4	Chicago Red Stars	Dublin, Ohio
		WPSL Report	Weissenhofer 14', 85'; Ewing 25'; Cinalli 89'	Stadium: Dublin Jerome High School

July 30, 2011 WPSL Semi-finals	Chicago Red Stars	2–1	Tampa Bay Hellenic	Lisle, Illinois
15:00 CDT (UTC-05)	Weissenhofer 46'; Ewing 54'	WPSL Report	Mathelier 74'	Stadium: Village of Lisle-Benedictine University Sports Complex

July 31, 2011 WPSL finals	Chicago Red Stars	1–2 (a.e.t.)	Orange County Waves	Lisle, Illinois
13:00 CDT (UTC-05)	Ewing 88'	WPSL Report	Bosio 43'; Taylor 101'	Stadium: Village of Lisle-Benedictine University Sports Complex

== Statistics ==
=== Golden Boot ===
Rank	Scorer	G	A
1	(United States) Amanda Cinalli	10	1
2	(United States) Michele Weissenhofer	9	8
3	(United States) Julie Ewing	5	2
4	(United States) Vanessa DiBernardo	4	4
5	(United States) Kara Kabellis	4	3

Source: wpsl.info

=== Other information ===
Chairman	(United States)
Ground (capacity and dimensions)	Benedetti-Wehrli Stadium (??? / N/A)

Source: http://chicagoredstars.com/history/
