= Shannon McDonnell =

Shannon McDonnell may refer to:

- Shannon McDonnell (rugby league)
- Shannon McDonnell (footballer)
