= MagicJack (WPS) =

Defunct soccer club

magicJack
- Founded: 2011
- Dissolved: 2012
- Stadium: FAU Soccer Field
- Capacity: 1,200
- Owner: Dan Borislow
- Manager: Abby Wambach
- League: Women's Professional Soccer
- 2011: WPS, 3rd
Home colors	Away colors

magicJack (stylized with the first letter in lower case) was an American professional soccer club based in Boca Raton, Florida. The team competed in Women's Professional Soccer (WPS) for one season until legal challenges caused the team's owner, Dan Borislow, to be banned from the WPS, which folded in 2012.

== History ==
=== Freedom era ===
In 2001, magicJack was founded as Washington Freedom, a team of the defunct Women's United Soccer Association (WUSA). The Freedom were the only team to continue as an organization after WUSA folded, first playing exhibition games, then joining the W-League. The Freedom were a founding member of WUSA's successor, Women's Professional Soccer. In 2011, the team was purchased by Dan Borislow, the owner of the phone tech company magicJack, renamed, and relocated to Boca Raton, Florida.

=== First season ===
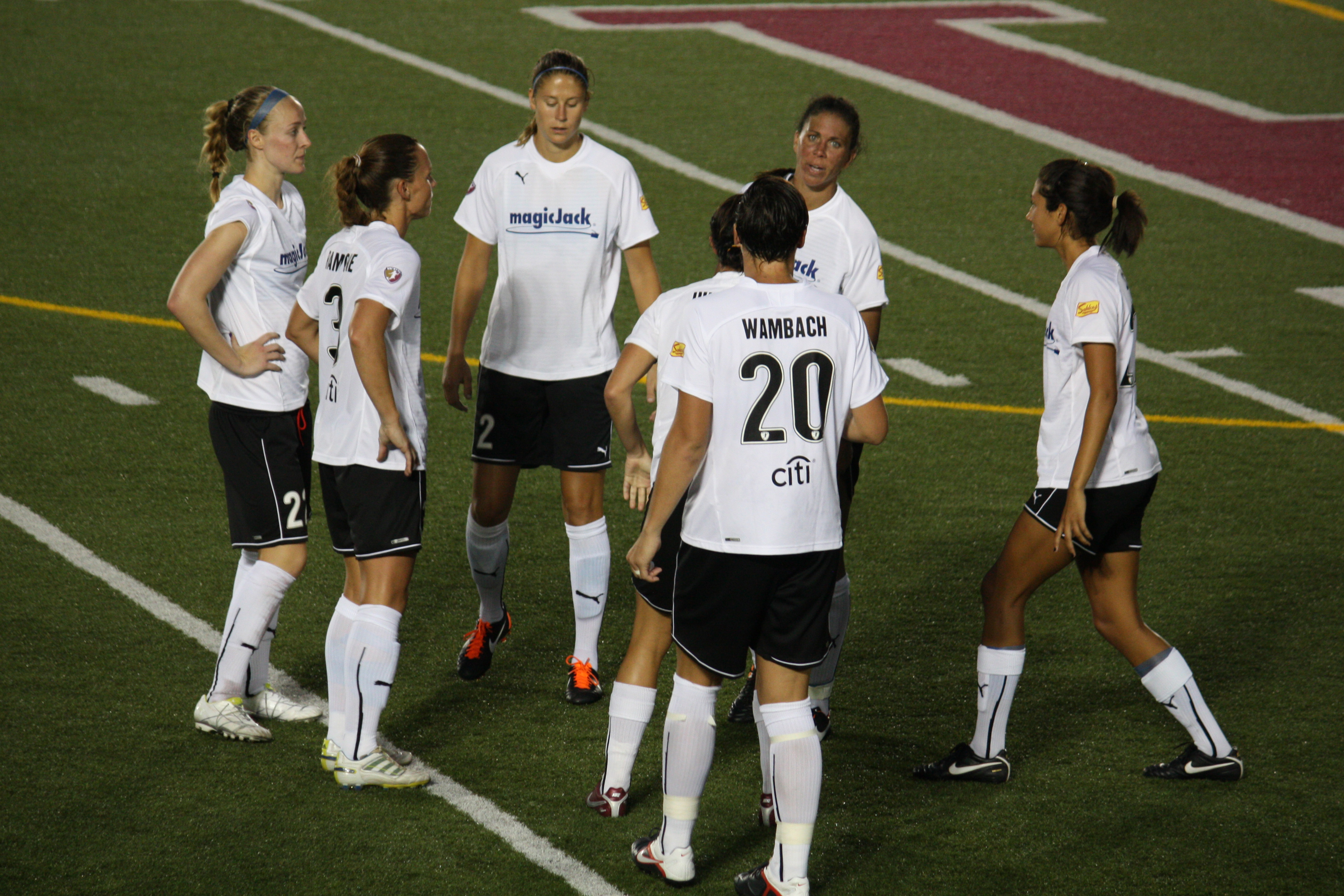
Team magicJack players at midfield in August 2011

The team opened its 2011 season with three wins, and was the only team with a perfect record for the first month of the season. Despite this, coach Mike Lyons was then dismissed, beginning a long period of coaching controversy, while both Borislow and Christie Rampone functioned as team coach at various points. While five of majicJack's players were starring for the 2011 USA Women's World Cup team in Germany, magicJack's depleted squad lost to the Philadelphia Independence in a WPS-record 6–0 defeat.

On July 21, 2011, Abby Wambach was named as magicJack's player-coach for the rest of the season. The team was the visiting side when the Western New York Flash of Rochester (Wambach's hometown) set the new WPS league record attendance of 15,404. magicJack ultimately finished third in both the regular season and the playoffs.

=== Battling with the league ===
In the waning months of the season, Borislow sent an e-mail to his players telling them that WPS was threatening to terminate the team before the season was over, and he filed a suit in Florida courts. The league denied this accusation, and agreements were made for the suit to be dropped.

On October 25, 2011, the Women's Professional League Governors voted to terminate the franchise, accusing owner Dan Borislow of violations ranging from "unprofessional and disparaging treatment of his players" to "failure to pay his bills". WPS also stated, "Mr. Borislow's actions have been calculated to tarnish the reputation of the league and damage the league's business relationships." All players were able to sign with new teams when free agency started on November 9, 2011.

Forward Ella Masar was the only magicJack player to publicly condemn the team owner, Dan Borislow, accusing him of mistreating players, including her.

=== Exhibition team ===
Borislow again filed suit in Florida courts; on January 10, 2012, the judge ruled that the league could not terminate the team's franchise without following its own procedures, and a hearing was set for the following week. Before adjudication resumed, WPS and Borislow reached another deal, this time allowing Borislow to keep his team as an exhibition team, guaranteeing magicJack at least seven games for each of the next two years, one at each of the WPS teams' home grounds and two in Florida. The WPS announced on January 30 that it was suspending the 2012 season, in part because of their legal dispute with Borislow. The league announced that it would cease all operations on May 18, 2012. Borislow died in July 2014 of a heart attack after playing in a soccer game.

== Players ==
=== Final squad ===
As of December 2011.

Note: Flags indicate national team as defined under FIFA eligibility rules; some limited exceptions apply. Players may hold more than one non-FIFA nationality.

No.	Pos.	Nation	Player
1	GK	USA	Hope Solo
2	DF	USA	Marian Dalmy
3	DF	USA	Christie Rampone
5	FW	USA	Lindsay Tarpley
6	MF	JAM	Omolyn Davis
7	MF	USA	Shannon Boxx
8	MF	CAN	Sophie Schmidt
9	FW	USA	Megan Rapinoe
10	DF	USA	Tina Ellertson
11	FW	AUS	Lisa De Vanna

No.	Pos.	Nation	Player
14	MF	USA	Sarah Huffman
16	MF	USA	Lydia Vandenbergh
17	GK	USA	Brett Maron
20	FW	USA	Abby Wambach
21	GK	USA	Jillian Loyden
22	DF	USA	Becky Sauerbrunn
23	FW	USA	Christen Press
26	MF	USA	Nikki Washington
30	GK	CAN	Karina LeBlanc
55	FW	USA	Ella Masar

== Season table ==
Final regular season standings.

Blue denotes regular season champion, and top seed in 2011 Women's Professional Soccer Playoffs.

Green denotes team has spot in 2011 Women's Professional Soccer Playoffs.

Place	Team	Pld	W	D	L	GF	GA	GD	Pts
1	Western New York Flash	18	13	3	2	40	18	+22	42
2	Philadelphia Independence	18	11	3	4	31	18	+13	36
3	MagicJack	18	9	2	7	29	29	0	28*
4	Boston Breakers**	18	5	4	9	19	24	-5	19
5	Sky Blue FC	18	5	4	9	24	29	-5	19
6	Atlanta Beat	18	1	4	13	7	32	-25	7

Source: WPS standings

*MagicJack was docked one point on 12 May for various violations of league standards.

**Boston wins head-to-head 2-1-1 over Sky Blue.
