= Mary Therese McDonnell =

Association footballer

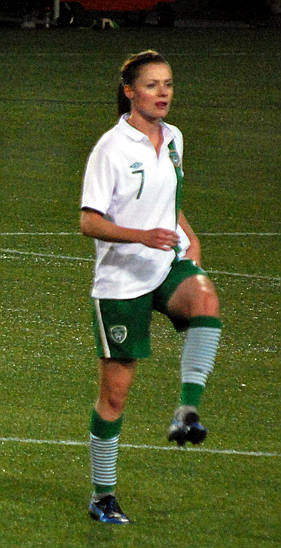

Personal information
- Date of birth: 26 August 1986 (age 40)
- Place of birth: Orland Park, Illinois, United States
- Height: 5 ft 6 in (1.68 m)
- Position: Defender

Youth career
- Windy City Pride

Senior career*
Years	Team	Apps	(Gls)
2004–2007	Illinois Fighting Illini		
2008	Boston Renegades	5	(4)
2009	Sky Blue FC	0	(0)
2009	Chicago Red Stars	0	(0)
2010	St. Louis Athletica	0	(0)
2011–2012	Chicago Red Stars	8	(0)

International career^{‡}
2008–	Republic of Ireland	21	(0)
- * Club domestic league appearances and goals as of June 13, 2013 ‡ National team caps and goals as of April 2, 2014

Mary Therese McDonnell (born 26 August 1986), is an Irish American soccer defender. She is a Republic of Ireland women's national football team player. After being released from St. Louis Athletica's preseason training camp in March 2010, she rejoined the Chicago Red Stars for 2011.

== College career ==
McDonnell attended Carl Sandburg High School then spent four years at the University of Illinois at Urbana–Champaign studying speech and hearing sciences. In 2012, she played for the University of Illinois College of Law Club team, Learned Foot, in the Champaign County Soccer League helping the Learned Foot win the title.

== Club career ==
After graduating McDonnell played for Boston Renegades in the 2008 W-League season, scoring four goals in five games.

McDonnell was assigned to Sky Blue FC in the 2009 WPS Draft. However, she was released the week before the squads were finalised and instead joined Chicago Red Stars as a developmental player. In July 2009 McDonnell played for the Irish national team against her Chicago Red Stars club side in an exhibition game at the Sports Complex at Benedictine University. The Red Stars released McDonnell in September 2009.

She then attended St. Louis Athletica's preseason training camp,

== International career ==
McDonnell first appeared for the Republic of Ireland in three friendly games against the United States in September 2008. She said, "After college I played in Boston for a summer and it turned out my coach was Irish. He literally walked up to us on the practice field and asked if any of us were Irish, and one thing led to another. It’s been great." Mary Therese and elder sister Shannon featured in Ireland's qualifying campaigns for Euro 2009 and World Cup 2011. Daughters of Ian and Jean McDonnell, their eligibility for the Irish team derived from their grandfather; who was from Foxford.

Both sisters were called up to the national squad in August 2011, ahead of the Euro 2013 qualifying series.
