= Dan Borislow =

American entrepreneur, sports team owner and thoroughbred horse breeder

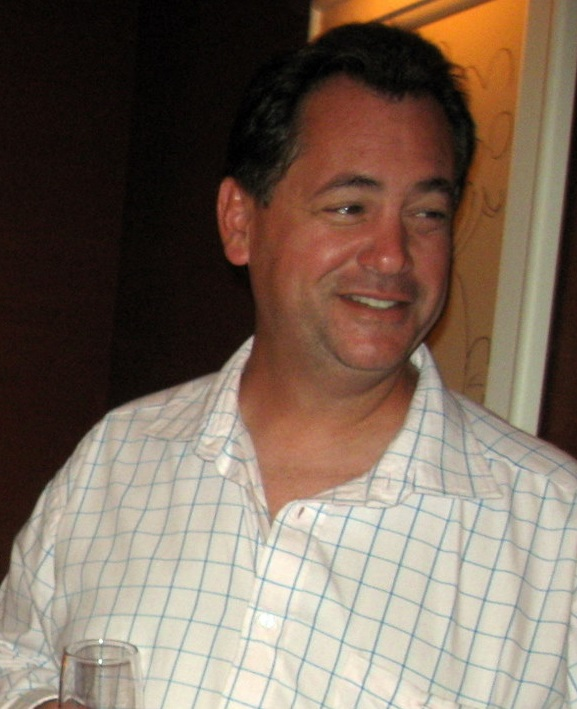
- Borislow in 2010
- Born: September 21, 1961; Philadelphia, Pennsylvania, U.S.
- Died: July 21, 2014 (aged 52); West Palm Beach, Florida, U.S.
- Occupations: Telecommunications, Horse breeding
- Spouse: Michele (Shelly)
- Children: 2

Daniel Marc Borislow (September 21, 1961 – July 21, 2014) was an American entrepreneur, sports team owner, inventor, and thoroughbred horse breeder. Borislow was born and grew up in Philadelphia, Pennsylvania, and attended Widener University. In 1989, he founded Tel-Save, Inc. to resell access to AT&T long distance lines. Borislow took the company public in 1995, and two years later brokered a $100 million deal with AOL at the "Cafe L’Europe," Palm Beach. In early 1998, Tel-Save had sales of $300 million and was valued by Wall Street investors at $2 billion. However, due to the financial strain of paying off the AOL deal, Tel-Save lost $221 million in 1999, and Borislow sold his stock for approximately $300 million and retired.

In his brief retirement, he focused on his horse racing career. After selling most of his horses in 2004, Borislow set forth plans for a new voice-over-IP business which became the magicJack. Invented in 2007, the magicJack is a small product that is plugged into a computer's USB port and allows for unlimited calling from regular telephones. In 2010, YMAX, the company behind the magicJack, merged with an Israeli company and became a publicly traded corporation.

In 2011, Borislow purchased a controlling share of the Washington Freedom women's professional soccer team. He had a brief turbulent relationship with other owners and the players which ended in a battle of lawsuits and the termination of the soccer team and league.

Borislow and his family lived in Palm Beach County, Florida. Borislow died from an apparent heart attack on July 21, 2014.

== Business career ==
=== Tel-Save ===
In 1989, Borislow founded Tel-Save when he was in his 20s to resell access to AT&T long distance lines. The company was based in New Hope, Pennsylvania, and its primary market was toward small and medium-sized businesses. Borislow took the company public in 1995 and had an initial public offering of three million shares. He then invested in his own long distance network by deploying five Lucent 5ESS-2000 switches throughout the United States. By 1997, Tel-Save was making $20 million a year.

In 1997, Borislow negotiated a three-year deal with America Online that granted Tel-Save exclusive marketing rights to sell long distance to AOL users. AOL users, meanwhile, would now be billed online for their local, long distance, cellular, and internet services. His original asking price was $50 million, but after negotiations, the figure increased to $100 million, in addition to half of future profits and 15 percent of the company's stock. Having rescued a reeling AOL from Chapter 11, Borislow was compared to Ted Turner for his vision and marketing abilities by Bob Pittman, president of AOL. This deal with Borislow skyrocketed AOL's stock prices 231% over the next year and catapulted them to be the dominant online provider with no runner up in sight. In December of that year, Borislow was behind the merger of Tel-Save and STF, a similar company that provided telecommunications services to office buildings.

At its peak in early 1998, Tel-Save had sales of $300 million and was valued by Wall Street investors at $2 billion. His personal stock in the company was $500 million. Borislow's America Online deal was the catalyst for other "portal deals" with AOL. The company's fortunes turned due to the financial strain of the AOL deal, and following an annual loss of $221 million in 1998, he resigned as CEO of the company on January 1, 1999. Gabriel Battista was named CEO in his absence. Tel-Save is now known as Talk America.

=== magicJack ===
In 2005, after retiring from business to focus on his horse racing career, Borislow set forth plans for a new voice-over-IP business, with an initial name of Talk4free. He created YMAX Communications Corporation in April 2006 as a communications and equipment service. YMAX's profits come from the production of the magicJack, a small device which can be plugged into a computer's USB port and allows for unlimited calling from regular telephones.

CEO Borislow invented the product in 2007 and had applied for patents from the U.S. government while he and Donald Burns shared the payment of $25 million to start up the company.

Before Borislow launched a widespread television campaign in January 2008, the company sold less than 1,000 magicJacks per day. By June, he was selling 8,000-9,000 per day and had roughly 500,000 subscribers in total. Borislow attributes its success to its pricing, at $40 in the first year of service and $20 each year thereafter. Although its voice quality has been criticized, Ted Kritsonis of The Globe and Mail said the "MagicJack was still better than most cell phones I've tried."

In 2009, Florida Attorney General Bill McCollum investigated a claim that Borislow falsely marketed the magicJack as having a free 30-day trial of the product. In reality, the customer must specifically cancel the trial prior to the 30-day mark, otherwise the credit card would be automatically billed. While Borislow maintained that his company's actions were not illegal, he reached a settlement on April 15, agreeing to pay the state of Florida $125,000 for the cost of the investigation. He said the company resolved over 500 complaints and added a disclaimer on the website clarifying the misconception.

VocalTec, an Israeli telephone company, acquired YMAX in July 2010. Since Borislow and other YMAX businessmen contributed most of the equity, they essentially run the merged business, which kept the "YMAX" moniker. VocalTec was a publicly traded company, so YMAX went on Nasdaq following the merger. In 2010, YMAX had a market capitalization of $300 million and is expected to make $110 million to $125 million in sales.

== Horse racing career and gambling ==
After watching horse races at Philadelphia Park for some time, Borislow decided to go into the business in 1991. He frequently wagered on trainer John Scanlan's horses, so he requested Scanlan to be the conditioner for his horses. Among Borislow's first acquisitions was broodmare Beautiful Bid, who gave birth to Breeders' Cup Distaff winner and Eclipse champion Beautiful Pleasure. In 2000, he sold Beautiful Bid for $2.6 million.

Borislow bought a $1.8 million yearling in September 1999 that he named Talk Is Money. The thoroughbred was named after Tel-Save, with Borislow saying, "Every time someone was talking on the phone, I made money." Talk Is Money's best finish came at the Tesio Stakes in April 2001, where the horse placed second. This qualified him for the 2001 Kentucky Derby, and Borislow hired jockey Jerry Bailey, who won the 2000 Breeders Cup Juvenile with Macho Uno. At 47-1 odds, Talk Is Money came in last in the Derby and did not finish the race.

Borislow's most successful horse was Toccet, who won four graded stakes, including the Champagne and Hollywood Futurity in 2002. Toccet's name is a misspelled tribute to former National Hockey League (NHL) player Rick Tocchet. The horse was named runner-up to Vindication for the American Champion Two-Year-Old Colt in 2002, a part of the Eclipse Award. Once a favorite to enter the 2003 Kentucky Derby, Toccet was derailed by ankle injuries early in the year. He won one listed stakes after his juvenile season out of 15 starts and now stands at Castleton Lyons.

After a dispute with the Internal Revenue Service, Borislow sold a majority of his horses at the Fasig-Tipton November sale in 2004. In February 2005, he was in a partnership with baseball manager Joe Torre and hockey player Keith Jones to buy Wild Desert, a Canadian bred Thoroughbred racehorse. In June of that year, Wild Desert had a controversial win at the 2005 Queen's Plate, Canada's most prestigious race, off a layoff of over 10 weeks. Borislow won $100,000 from bets he had made on Wild Desert to win the race. This was also considered controversial in part because the horse had won only three races from twenty career starts; the Queen's Plate was the only major race win of his career.

In February 2006, Borislow spoke to the press about Operation Slapshot, a gambling ring exposed amongst National Hockey League (NHL) players, including Wayne Gretzky and his wife Janet, as well as Borislow's friend Rick Tocchet, namesake of his horse Toccet. Borislow commented: "I used to bet on sports. And, $1.4-million? I would do that in an afternoon...I'm one of the largest bettors in the country."

In May 2014, Borislow hit the Gulfstream Park 'Rainbow Six' -- a popular multi-race horse betting wager that pays out its major jackpot only when a single bettor correctly selects the winners of all six designated races in the sequence -- paying him $6.6 million. His winning Rainbow Six ticket of all/all/all/1,4/all/all cost $7,603.20. He played two other similar tickets with a total cost of $22,809.60.

== Women's Professional Soccer ==
In 2011, Borislow bought Women's Professional Soccer (WPS) franchise Washington Freedom, moved it to South Florida, and renamed it magicJack. Borislow attracted stars of the United States national women's soccer team such as Abby Wambach and Hope Solo with salaries well above the league average of $25,000 per year. Borislow was criticized for discriminatory treatment of lesser-known players. Cat Whitehill, a former player and sports broadcaster said, "There are so few superstars that the majority of players can be easily intimidated." She added that the stars, "never deliberately meant for the other players on the roster to be treated badly. But it does appear that they didn't consider what standing up to Borislow would mean for the rest of the team."

On July 8, 2011, the non-National Team members of magicJack voted to file a grievance through their Players' Union against Borislow. The grievance alleged that Borislow had violated the Standard Player Contract Provision, the FIFA Code of Ethics, WPS Media Policy and U.S. Soccer Federation Coaching Requirements. The suit alleged Borislow's "practice of bullying and threatening players, and his creation of a hostile, oppressive, and intimidating work environment which adversely affects players’ ability (to) perform".

The only individual player to speak out publicly about Borislow was Ella Masar. Masar told of a team meeting in which Borislow demanded that the grievance be dropped or he would terminate the players and the magicJack season. He refused to pay for treatment for a broken nose she suffered while playing for MagicJack and insisted that players call him "Daddy."

Borislow also had problems with WPS staff and owners of other teams. In response to ongoing conflicts with Borislow, in June 2011 WPS moved to terminate his franchise at the end of the season for breach of contractual obligations. Borislow subsequently filed an injunction that would force the league into arbitration rather than settling the matter with the league's Board of Governors. On October 25, 2011, the WPS voted to terminate the franchise, accusing Borislow of violations ranging from "unprofessional and disparaging treatment of his players to failure to pay his bills." WPS also stated, "Mr. Borislow's actions have been calculated to tarnish the reputation of the league and damage the league's business relationships." The team was disbanded on October 28, 2011. The ongoing legal battle with the WPS led to the cancelling of the 2012 season for "pending legal issues" on January 1, 2012, and the magicJack soccer franchise ceased to exist.

== Philanthropy ==
D&K Charitable Foundation was established by Borislow in 1997 with a $21 million stock donation. In the first two years, he tried to use the charity to buy and preserve a tract of land in New Hope, Pennsylvania. This venture failed in 1998 when the property owner declined Borislow's offer. Following this, D&K made donations to the Clearwater Endoscopy Center and the Center for Digestive Healthcare in Clearwater, Florida until 2001. Since then, it has issued varied grants to causes Borislow supported, such as $2.75 million to two yeshivas and $173,450 to a West Palm Beach, Florida private school.

== Personal life ==
Borislow lived with his wife, Michele, and two children, Danny and Kylie, in Palm Beach County, Florida. He also maintained a home in Brigantine, New Jersey.

In his free time, he enjoyed playing soccer, watching sports, and deep sea fishing.

On May 25, 2014, he won $6,678,939.12 with the only ticket to have the winners of the final six races on Gulfstream's card. The winner of the biggest payoff in American racing history invested $7,603.20 on the bet, which has a 20-cent base wager. He covered the full fields in all but the sixth race, in which he had only the Nos. 1 and 4. Borislow made two other similar bets on the race, with a total investment of $22,809.60.

Borislow died from a heart attack (myocardial infarction) in Jupiter, Florida on July 21, 2014, reportedly after playing in an adult league soccer match. On July 25, 2014, more than 500 mourners attended a memorial service at the Kravis Center in West Palm Beach.

== Footnotes ==
=== Bibliography ===
- Grant, Tina (2005). International Directory of Company Histories. Vol. 70. Detroit: St. James Press.
- Munk, Nina (2004). Fools Rush In: Steve Case, Jerry Levin, and the Unmaking of AOL Time Warner. HarperCollins. ISBN 0-06-054035-4.
