= Sophie Reiser =

American soccer player

Personal information
- Full name: Sophie Noel Reiser
- Date of birth: December 21, 1987 (age 38)
- Place of birth: Seattle, Washington, United States
- Height: 5 ft 5 in (1.65 m)
- Position: Midfielder

Team information
- Current team: Sounders Women (WPS)
- Number: 10

College career
Years	Team	Apps	(Gls)
2006–2009	Columbia Lions		

Senior career*
Years	Team	Apps	(Gls)
2010	Chicago Red Stars		
2012	Seattle Sounders		
- * Club domestic league appearances and goals

Sophie Noel Reiser (born December 21, 1987) is an American soccer midfielder for the Seattle Sounders Women of the United Soccer Leagues W-League.

Reiser attended Columbia University and was named Ivy League Player of the Year in 2008. She played for the US WNT U-23 team and was drafted to the WPS Chicago Red Stars in 2010.
