= 2011 Women's Professional Soccer Playoffs =

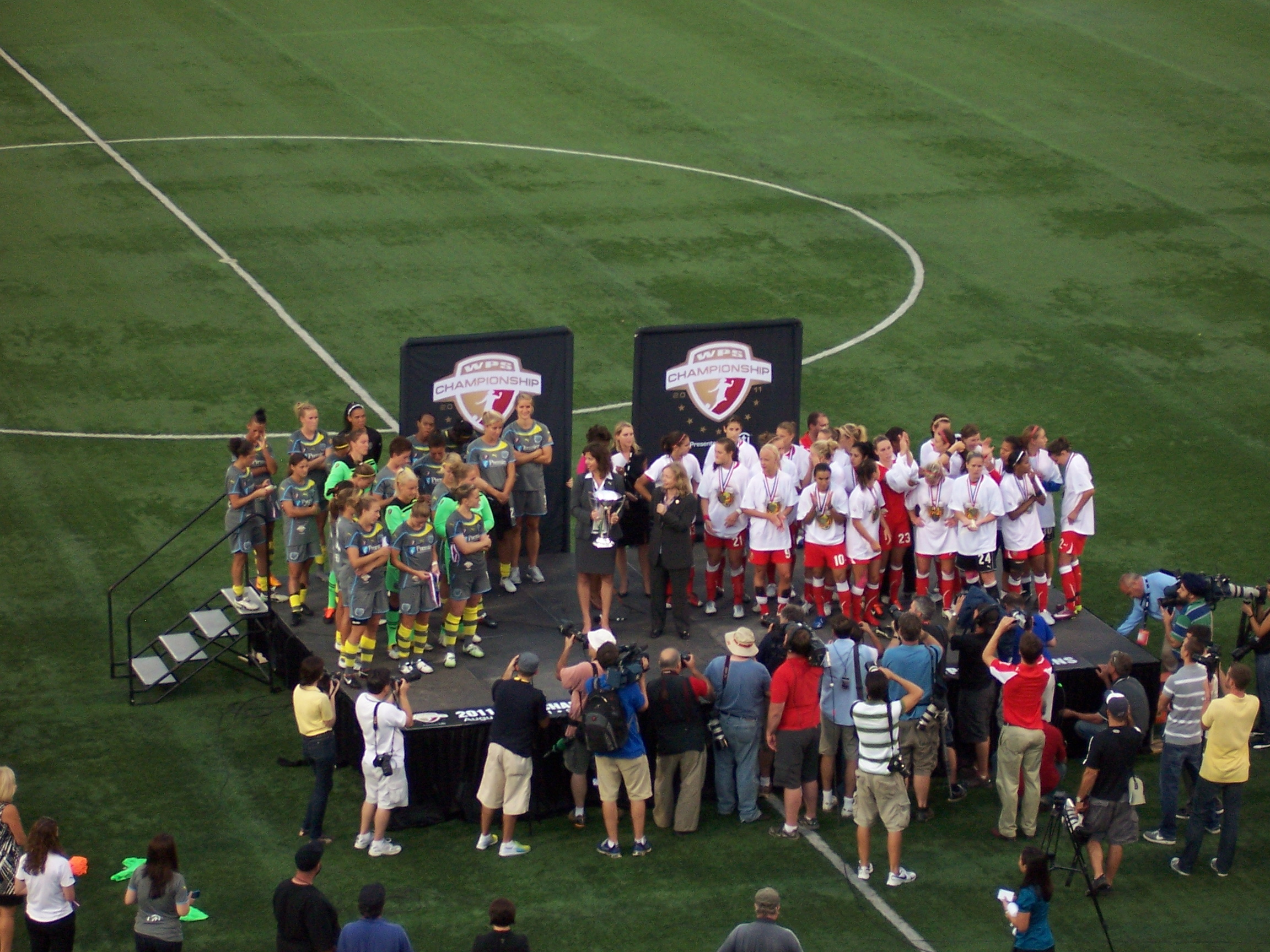
The Independence (gray) and the Flash (red/white) are recognized after the championship game

The 2011 WPS Playoffs were the postseason to Women's Professional Soccer's 2011 Season, which started on August 17 and culminated on August 27 at Sahlen's Stadium in Rochester, New York.

== Standings ==
Pos	Team	Pld	W	D	L	GF	GA	GD	Pts	Promotion or relegation
1	Western New York Flash	18	13	3	2	40	18	+22	42	Advance to Championship
2	Philadelphia Independence	18	11	3	4	31	18	+13	36	Advance to Super Semifinal
3	magicJack	18	9	2	7	29	29	0	28 (Note: magicJack were deducted a point for various league violations.)	Advance to First round
4	Boston Breakers	18	5	4	9	19	24	−5	19 (Note: BOS: 7 pts; SKY: 4 pt)	Advance to First round
5	Sky Blue FC	18	5	4	9	24	29	−5	19	
6	Atlanta Beat	18	1	4	13	7	32	−25	7	

Updated to match(es) played on unknown. Source: soccerway
Rules for classification: 1) points, 2) goal difference, 3) head-to-head result.

== Bracket ==
First Round
3	magicJack	3
4	Boston Breakers	1

Super Semifinal
2	Philadelphia Independence	2
3	magicJack	0

WPS Final
1	Western New York Flash	1(5)
2	Philadelphia Independence	1(4)

== Results ==
=== First round ===
August 17, 2011
7:30 pm EDT

magicJack	3 – 1	Boston Breakers
Wambach 6', 57' (pen.); Rapinoe 61'		Buehler (yellow card) 17'; Winters 31', (yellow card) 81'; Hemmings (yellow card) 35'

FAU Soccer Stadium, Boca Raton, Florida
Attendance: 2,075
Referee: Christina Ibanez

=== Super Semifinal ===
August 20, 2011
4:00 PM EDT

Philadelphia Independence	2 – 0	magicJack
Kai 46'; Rodriguez 81'		Rampone (yellow card) 12'; Wambach (yellow card) 86'

PPL Park, Chester, Pennsylvania
Attendance: 5,410
Referee: Ted Unkel

=== WPS Championship ===
August 27, 2011
4:00 PM EDT

Western New York Flash	1 – 1 (a.e.t.)	Philadelphia Independence
Edwards (yellow card) 25'; Sinclair 64'; Goebel (yellow card) 96' (yellow-red card) 108'; Marta (yellow card) 103'		Rodriguez 88', (yellow card) 90+3'
Penalties
Marta (penalty scored); Sinclair (penalty scored); Zerboni (penalty scored); Seger (penalty scored); Averbuch (penalty scored)	5 – 4	(penalty scored) Sanderson; (penalty scored) Adams; (penalty scored) Robinson; (penalty scored) Boquete; (penalty missed) del Rio

Sahlen's Stadium, Rochester, New York
Attendance: 10,461
Referee: Kari Seitz

== Media coverage ==
The First Round will be viewable on Fox Soccer Channel with the others on Fox Sports Net; all will be simultaneously webcast on the WPS website.

== See also ==
- 2011 Women's Professional Soccer season
- Women's Professional Soccer
