= Natalie Spilger =

American soccer player

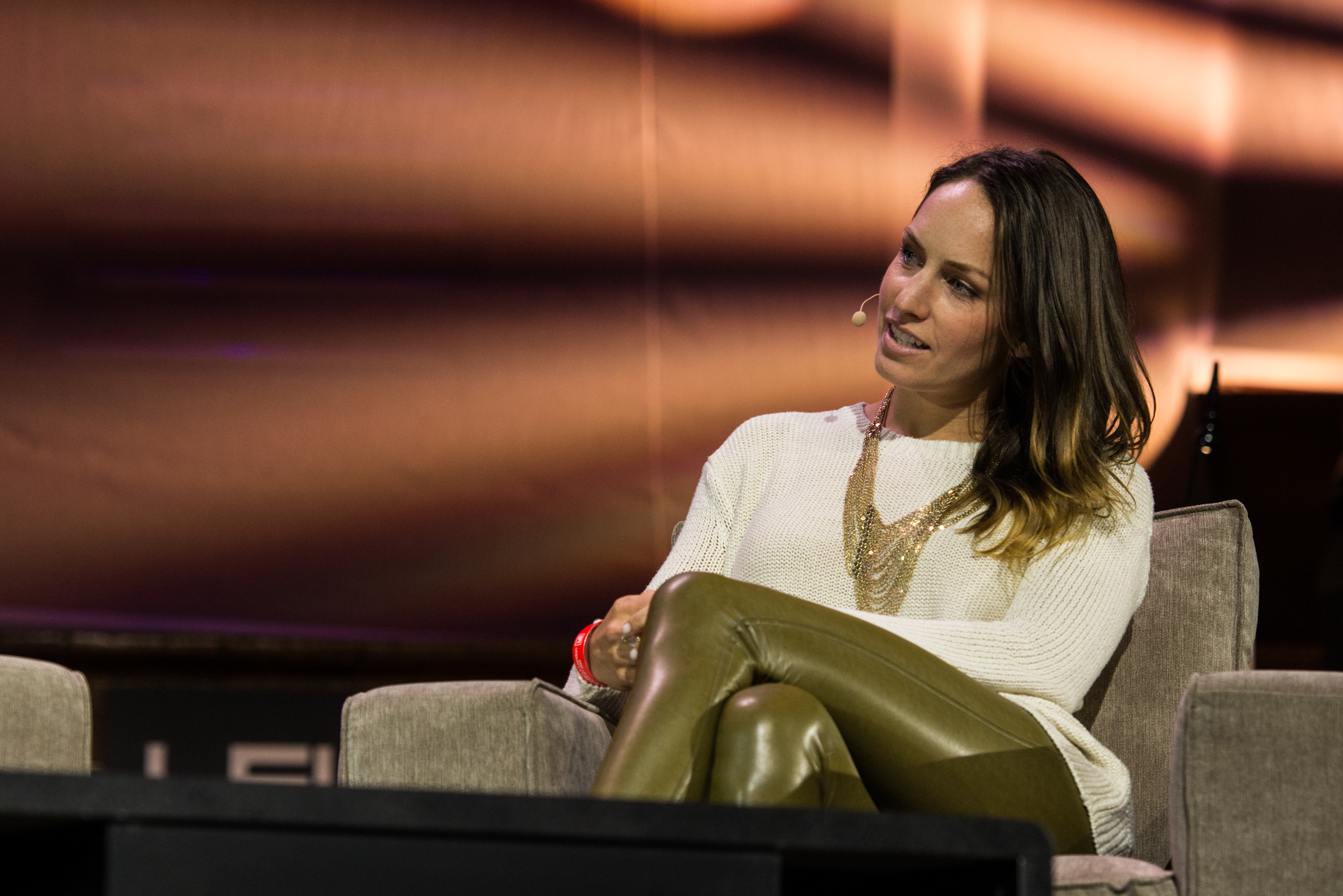
- Spilger in 2013

Personal information
- Full name: Natalie Marie Spilger
- Date of birth: May 19, 1982 (age 44)
- Place of birth: El Cajon, California, United States
- Height: 5 ft 6 in (1.68 m)
- Position: Defender

College career
Years	Team	Apps	(Gls)
2000–2003	Stanford Cardinal		

Senior career*
Years	Team	Apps	(Gls)
- California Storm
2008	Bälinge IF		
2009–2010	Chicago Red Stars	17	(0)

International career
- United States U-18
- United States U-21
- * Club domestic league appearances and goals

Natalie Marie Spilger (born May 19, 1982) is a retired American soccer defender. Spilger is a former member of the United States U-21 women's national soccer team.

Spilger is also the CEO and founder of GreenLaces, an international organization that activates the global athletic community to improve our environment by inspiring personal action, connecting a community and educating fans.
