= Kelsey Davis =

American soccer player

Personal information
- Full name: Kelsey Laine Davis
- Date of birth: May 14, 1987 (age 39)
- Place of birth: Thousand Oaks, California, United States
- Height: 5 ft 10 in (1.78 m)
- Position: Goalkeeper

Team information
- Current team: Boston Breakers
- Number: 18

Youth career
- –2005: So Cal United

College career
Years	Team	Apps	(Gls)
2005	UCLA Bruins		
2006–2009	Portland Pilots		

Senior career*
Years	Team	Apps	(Gls)
2010	Chicago Red Stars		
2011	Boston Breakers		

International career
2004–2006	United States U-20		
2007	United States U-23		
- * Club domestic league appearances and goals

Kelsey Laine Davis (born May 14, 1987) is an American soccer player, coach, and Episcopal priest from Thousand Oaks, California. She played goalkeeper for the Boston Breakers and Chicago Red Stars of Women's Professional Soccer and the United States U-23 women's national soccer team. After her playing and coaching career, Davis was ordained as a priest in The Episcopal Church, where she currently serves as Bishop's Deputy for Disaster Response & Recovery for the Episcopal Diocese of Western North Carolina and Vicar of St. George's Episcopal Church in Asheville, North Carolina. She is co-founder of the sports ministry organization Christian Athlete Circles and co-author, with Rev. Claire Brown, of The Athlete Devotional: 40 Days of Spiritual Practice.

== Playing Career ==
=== National Team career ===
Davis played in the 2004 FIFA U-19 Women's World Championship in Thailand and the 2006 FIFA U-20 Women's World Championship in Russia.

In May 2009, Davis was named to the senior national team roster for two games against Canada. During an exhibition game with the United States U-23 women's national soccer team in June against F.C. Indiana, Davis fractured her jaw and was unable to compete with the U-23 team later that summer in England.

Davis returned to the U-23 national team in May 2010 and was the starting goalkeeper in two matches between the Germany U-23 national team and the South Korea U-20 national team, sharing the captain's armband with Lauren Fowlkes and Kylie Wright.

=== Professional career ===
Davis was drafted by the Chicago Red Stars at the 2010 WPS Draft, going 24th overall. After returning from national team duty in May 2010, Davis suffered an ACL injury that ended her first WPS season. Davis was signed by the Boston Breakers as a free agent on January 12, 2011.

== Coaching career ==
After her professional playing career, Davis moved into collegiate and national-team coaching. She served as an assistant coach at the University of Portland in 2011, then at Texas Christian University from 2012 to 2015. From 2014 to 2017, she was an assistant coach with U.S. Soccer's Youth National Teams, where she was part of the coaching staff that won the CONCACAF U-15 Championship in 2016.

== Sports Labor Union Organizing ==
Davis served as Player Affairs Manager for the National Women's Soccer League Players Association from 2023 to 2024, and as a Trustee of the Players Association's Support the Players National Emergency Trust from 2021 to 2022.

== Ministry career ==
Davis earned a Master of Divinity from Vanderbilt Divinity School (2015–2018), graduating as a Founder's Medalist, and also holds a Certificate of Anglican Studies from Iona School for Ministry WNC at Seminary of the Southwest (2023–2025). She was a Fellow in the Cal Turner Program for Moral Leadership in the Professions at Vanderbilt (2017–2018) and served as a chaplain intern at Monroe Carell Jr. Children's Hospital at Vanderbilt in 2017.

Davis served as Curator for Emerging Communities for the Episcopal Diocese of El Camino Real from 2018 to 2020, then as Director of Blue Ridge Service Corps and Campus Missioner for the Episcopal Diocese of Western North Carolina from 2020 to 2023. Since 2024, she has served as Bishop's Deputy for Disaster Response & Recovery for the diocese, and since 2025 as Vicar of St. George's Episcopal Church in Asheville, North Carolina. She is a Certified Disaster Chaplain through NY Interfaith Disaster Services (2026) and a Certified Narrative Enneagram Teacher (2022).

== Christian Athlete Circles and writing ==
In 2020, Davis co-founded Christian Athlete Circles, a sports ministry organization, and continues to serve as its Co-Director. The organization received the [Innovation in Formation Award in 2026] from Forma, The Episcopal Church's network for Christian formation.

Davis co-hosts Spirit of Sport, a podcast exploring the intersection of athletics, spirituality, and leadership. She is co-author, with Rev. Claire Brown, of The Athlete Devotional: 40 Days of Spiritual Practice (Good Faith Media). She is also a contributor to Under the Lights and in the Dark: Untold Stories of Women's Soccer by Gwendolyn Oxenham and The Millennial Narrative: Sharing the Good Life with the Next Generation by Jaco H. Hamman, and co-produced the documentary Thistle: stories of hope and healing from the women of Thistle Farms.

== Awards and honors ==
- All-American and Academic All-American, University of Portland (soccer)
- Lowe's Senior CLASS Award Finalist, University of Portland (soccer)
- Founder's Medalist for Top Honors, Vanderbilt Divinity School
- Nella May Overby Memorial Prize for Excellence in Field Education, Vanderbilt Divinity School
- Wilbur F. Tillett Prize for Excellence in Theology & Ethics, Vanderbilt Divinity School
- Harold Stirling Vanderbilt Scholarship, Vanderbilt Divinity School
- Innovation in Formation Award 2026, Forma, The Episcopal Church — awarded to Christian Athlete Circles

== Leadership and board roles ==
Davis serves on the leadership team of Common Ground, an initiative of the NCAA Office of Inclusion, and on the leadership team of the Beloved Community Commission of the Episcopal Diocese of Western North Carolina, which works on racial healing and reconciliation. She serves on the board of the Center for Contemplative Justice and, beginning in 2026, is a Fellow with Trinity Leadership Fellows.
