= Shannon McDonnell (footballer) =

Ireland international female footballer

Shannon DeVoe
Personal information
- Full name: Shannon Marie DeVoe
- Date of birth: 28 September 1984 (age 42)
- Place of birth: Orland Park, Illinois, United States
- Height: 5 ft 4 in (1.63 m)
- Position: Midfielder

Youth career
- Windy City Pride
- 2004–2007: Illinois Fighting Illini

Senior career*
Years	Team	Apps	(Gls)
2004	Windy City Bluez		
2006	Chicago Gaels		
2011	Chicago Red Stars		

International career
2009–2013	Republic of Ireland	12	(0)
- * Club domestic league appearances and goals

Shannon Marie DeVoe (née McDonnell; born 28 September 1984) is a former soccer midfielder, who represented the Republic of Ireland women's national football team. On the club level she most recently played for Women's Premier Soccer League (WPSL) club Chicago Red Stars, having previously played in the W-League with Windy City Bluez and Chicago Gaels.

== College career ==
DeVoe attended Carl Sandburg High School then spent four years at the University of Illinois at Urbana–Champaign, playing varsity soccer as well as studying speech and hearing sciences.

== Club career ==
While at college DeVoe played for Windy City Bluez in the 2004 W-League season. She also featured for Chicago Gaels in 2006.

In July 2009 DeVoe and sister Mary Therese McDonnell played for the Irish national team against Mary Therese's club side Chicago Red Stars in an exhibition game at the Sports Complex at Benedictine University.

Shannon signed for the Red Stars herself in June 2011, after the club left the Women's Professional Soccer and reconstituted itself at the lower level of the Women's Premier Soccer League. She was also hired as the club's camps director.

== International career ==
Devos first represented the Republic of Ireland during a summer 2009 training camp in Indiana. Shannon and younger sister Mary Therese McDonnell then featured in Ireland's failed qualifying campaigns for the 2011 FIFA Women's World Cup and UEFA Women's Euro 2013. Their eligibility for the Irish team derived from their grandfather, who was from Foxford.

== Coaching career ==
After her playing career DeVoe began working as an assistant coach for the Colorado Mines Orediggers' women's soccer team. She married the Orediggers wrestling coach Austin DeVoe.
