= Marcia McDermott =

American soccer player and coach (born 1965)

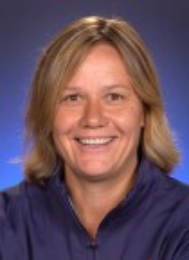
- McDermott in 2013

Personal information
- Full name: Marcia Ann McDermott
- Date of birth: August 16, 1965 (age 61)
- Place of birth: Lafayette, Indiana, U.S.
- Height: 5 ft 6 in (1.68 m)
- Positions: Defender; midfielder

Team information
- Current team: Sky Blue FC (technical advisor)

Youth career
- WAGSL
- VYSA ODP
- 1979–1983: McLean Highlanders

College career
Years	Team	Apps	(Gls)
1983–1986	North Carolina Tar Heels	89	(26)

International career
1986–1988	United States	7	(4)

Managerial career
- 1988: UNC Greensboro Spartans (assistant)
- 1989: Maryland Terrapins
- 1990–1992: Arkansas Razorbacks
- 1994–2000: Northwestern Wildcats
- 2001–2002: Carolina Courage
- 2006: Illinois Fighting Illini (assistant)
- 2007: Illinois Fighting Illini (associate HC)
- 2010: Chicago Red Stars (interim)
- 2011: United States (assistant)
- 2013–2017: Army Black Knights
- 2015–2016: United States U23

Marcia Ann McDermott (born August 16, 1965) is an American soccer executive, coach, and former player, who is currently a technical advisor for Sky Blue FC of the National Women's Soccer League. She most recently coached the Army Black Knights women's soccer team for five seasons until 2017.

== Playing career ==
In her youth, McDermott played in the Washington Area Girls Soccer League and Virginia Youth Soccer Association Olympic Development Program. She played for the McLean Highlanders in high school, where she was selected in the all-metropolitan team. She also participated in basketball and field hockey at McLean, and was chosen as the team's most valuable player in both sports. In college, she played for the North Carolina Tar Heels from 1983 to 1986. The team won the national championship in three of the seasons (1983, 1984, and 1986). During her career with the Tar Heels, she scored 26 goals and recorded 46 assists in 89 matches. She was an NSCAA First-Team All-American in 1986, and was included in the NCAA All-Tournament Team in 1983, 1985, and 1986.

== Coaching career ==
McDermott has spent 30 years coaching women's soccer, including positions with North Carolina-Greensboro, the University of Maryland, the University of Arkansas, Northwestern University, the University of Illinois, the Carolina Courage, the Chicago Red Stars, the U. S. Women's National Soccer Team (USWNT), and the United States Military Academy. She has also served as a scout for Illinois and the USWNT. In 2010, she briefly served as the interim coach of the Chicago Red Stars.

She coached teams that won gold medals at the 2008 Summer Olympics and the 2012 Summer Olympics as an assistant coach with the USWNT.

McDermott was active in the National Soccer Coaches Association of America (NSCAA), having served on the women's committee (1994–2000), board of directors (1999–2000), executive committee (2006–2011), and as president (2010–2011).

== Awards ==
McDermott was included in the ACC 50th Anniversary Women's Soccer Team in 2002. She was inducted into the Virginia–D.C. Soccer Hall of Fame in 2009, and the McLean High School Athletic Hall of Fame in 2011. In 2016, the NSCAA announced that they would honor McDermott with the Women's Soccer Award of Excellence.

== Personal life ==
McDermott graduated from the University of North Carolina at Chapel Hill in 1987 with a Bachelor of Arts in English.

== Career statistics ==
=== International ===
United States
Year	Apps	Goals
1986	6	4
1988	1	0
Total	7	4
