= Amanda Cinalli =

American soccer player

Personal information
- Full name: Amanda Marie Cinalli
- Date of birth: May 10, 1986 (age 40)
- Place of birth: Cleveland, Ohio, U.S.
- Height: 5 ft 10 in (1.78 m)
- Position: Forward

College career
Years	Team	Apps	(Gls)
2004–2007	Notre Dame Fighting Irish	100	(34)

Senior career*
Years	Team	Apps	(Gls)
2004	Fort Wayne Fever	11	(4)
2005–2008	Cleveland Internationals	27	(14)
2009	Saint Louis Athletica	12	(2)
2009–2010	Atlanta Beat		
2011–2012	Chicago Red Stars		

International career^{‡}
- United States U-16
- United States U-17
- United States U-21
	United States U-23	8	(2)
- * Club domestic league appearances and goals as of 21:00, September 28, 2009 (UTC) ‡ National team caps and goals as of 21:00, September 28, 2009 (UTC)

Amanda Marie Cinalli (born May 10, 1986) is an American soccer forward who played for Atlanta Beat of Women's Professional Soccer, Chicago Red Stars in Women's Premier Soccer League Elite and was a member of the United States U-23 women's national soccer team. She attended Laurel School in Shaker Heights, Ohio, and the University of Notre Dame
