= Marian Dougherty =

American soccer player (born 1984)

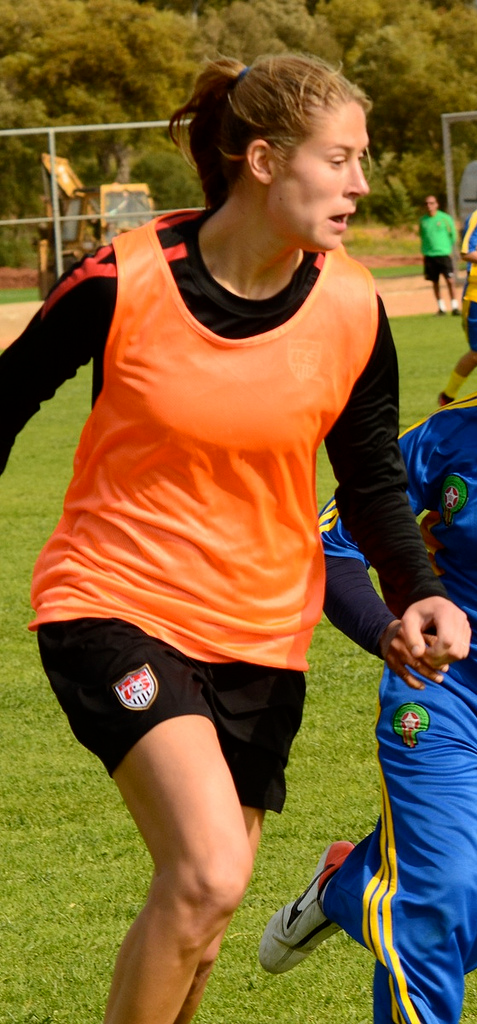

Personal information
- Full name: Marian Antal Dougherty
- Birth name: Marian Antal Dalmy
- Date of birth: November 25, 1984 (age 41)
- Place of birth: Denver, Colorado, United States
- Height: 5 ft 9 in (1.75 m)
- Position: Defender

College career
Years	Team	Apps	(Gls)
2003–2006	Santa Clara Broncos		

Senior career*
Years	Team	Apps	(Gls)
2002–2004	Denver Diamonds	?	(6)
2009–2010	Chicago Red Stars	40	(1)
2011	magicJack	18	(0)
2013	Portland Thorns FC	19	(1)

International career^{‡}
2007–2009	United States	11	(0)
Medal record
Women's football (soccer)
Representing the United States
FIFA Women's World Cup
Bronze medal – third place	2007 China	Team
- * Club domestic league appearances and goals as of July 19, 2013 (UTC) ‡ National team caps and goals as of May 23, 2010

Marian Antal Dougherty (née Dalmy; born November 25, 1984) is an American retired professional soccer defender. She last played for Portland Thorns FC in the National Women's Soccer League and had previously played for the United States women's national soccer team.

== Early life ==
Born in Denver, Colorado, to parents, Adam and Diane Dalmy, Marian grew up in Lakewood, Colorado and attended Green Mountain High School. She was a three-year team captain and earned MVP honors in 2001. She was named a 2003 Parade Magazine High School All-American and was a two-time NSCAA/adidas All-American. Dalmy helped lead the team to a state championship in 2003 and the league championships in 2000 and 2002.

Dougherty led her club team to the U-18 National Championship in July 2002. She won the MVP award for the Colorado State Cup on four occasions. Her team was a regional finalist for three seasons and State Cup Champions from 1996 to 1999, 2001 and 2002.

=== Santa Clara University ===
Dougherty attended Santa Clara University. As a freshman in 2003, she scored six goals and served two assists for 14 points while playing as forward and midfielder. She played in 17 matches, starting 14, after suffering a pulled leg muscle and left ankle sprain. She was named to the Soccer Buzz West Region All-Freshman team and earned SCU adidas Classic All-Tournament Team recognition. Dougherty was named by her teammates as the squad's Coaches Award recipient.

During her sophomore year, Dougherty played in all 25 matches, started 23. She played all three field positions and was named first-team All-WCC selection. She also earned Soccer Buzz and NSCAA/adidas second team All-West Region honors.

In 2005, Dougherty was named team captain, scored two goals and recorded two assists during the season. She earned All-America honorable mention honors from Soccer Times and Soccer Buzz Magazines and was named second-team All-West Region by Soccer Buzz. Dougherty was named to the all-tournament team at the ACC/WCC Challenge at Wake Forest and earned First-Team All-WCC honors. After suffering a torn ACL during the NCAA Third Round against Boston College, Dougherty's junior season with the Broncos ended prematurely.

During her senior year in 2006, Dougherty was the Broncos' tri-captain and vital member of a defense that shutout 11 opponents. She started as outside back during 20 of the team's 21 matches. She became the fifth Bronco to be named West Coast Conference (WCC) Player of the Year after leading all WCC defenders with six goals, six assists, and 18 points. She also named to the All-West Region and All-WCC First Teams.

== Club career ==
=== Chicago Red Stars ===
Dougherty played for Women's Professional Soccer side Chicago Red Stars from 2009 to 2010. During the team's first season, she started all 16 games, playing for a total of 1,310 minutes. During the 2010 season, she played the entirety of all 24 games, a total of 2,160 minutes, and scored one goal.

=== Washington Freedom / magicJack ===
In 2011, Dougherty signed with the Washington Freedom, who were later renamed magicJack under new ownership. She started in 19 of the 20 games she played for a total of 1,724 minutes.

=== Portland Thorns FC ===
In February 2013, Dougherty was selected by the Portland Thorns FC during the 2013 NWSL Supplemental Draft for the inaugural season of the National Women's Soccer League. She scored her first goal for the Thorns, and the Thorns' first ever home goal, during their first home match against Seattle Reign FC in front of 16,479 spectators. On November 16, 2013, Dougherty announced her retirement as a player. Post-retirement, she worked for Nike and provided color commentary for Thorns home games.

== International career ==
In March 2004, Dougherty was called into the United States U-21 National Team training camp while a sophomore at Santa Clara.

In April 2007, she was called up to the senior team's residency camp by head coach Greg Ryan. Dougherty played in two matches for the senior team in 2007 before being named as a late addition to the 2007 FIFA Women's World Cup roster for the USWNT.

== Sports Diplomacy ==
In 2018 Dougherty traveled to Morocco as a Sports Envoy for the U.S. Department of State, conducting soccer clinics and events for youth to promote education, empower women and girls, encourage peaceful conflict resolution, foster ethnic reconciliation, prevent bullying, and improve health and fitness.

== Personal ==
Dougherty's great-uncle, was a member of the Hungary national football team in 1938.

== Honors ==
Portland Thorns FC

- NWSL Championship: 2013
