= Village of Lisle-Benedictine University Sports Complex =

Sports venue in Lisle, Illinois

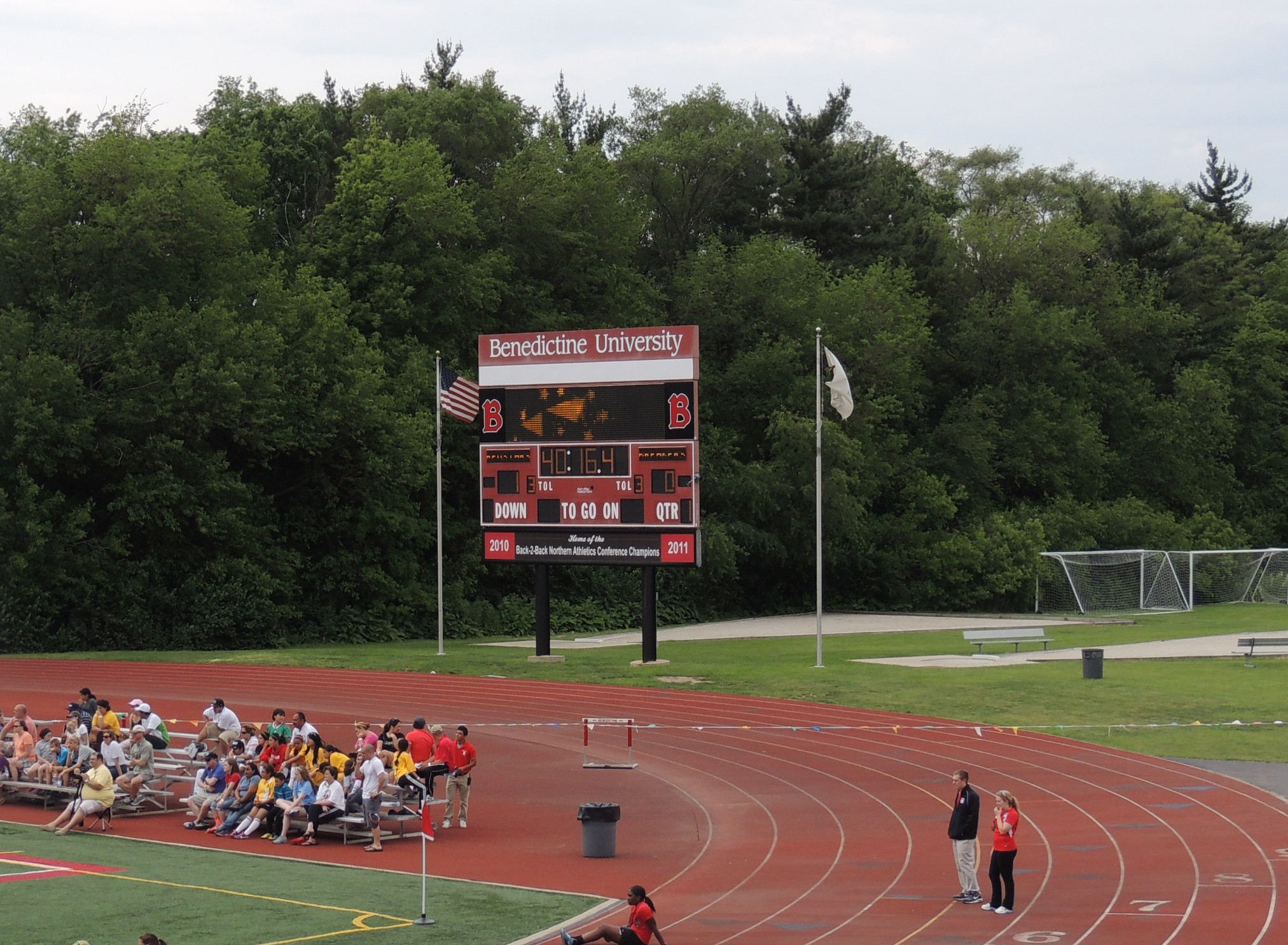
- Benedictine University Stadium scoreboard
- Interactive map of Village of Lisle-Benedictine University Sports Complex
- Location: Benedictine University campus, 5700 College Road, Lisle, Illinois 60532
- Coordinates: 41°46′45″N 88°5′52″W
- Surface: artificial surface for football and soccer; natural grass for baseball and softball

Construction
- Opened: 2005
- Cost: under US$ 9 million
- Architect: DLR Group
- General contractor: Walsh Construction

Tenants
- Benedictine Eagles (NCAA D-III) (2005–present); Chicago Machine (MLL) (2006); Chicago Red Stars (WPSL/WPSLE/NWSL) (2011–2015); DuPage Drones (PL) (2016); DuPage Pistol Shrimp (PL) (2019–)

Village of Lisle-Benedictine University Sports Complex is a facility for football, baseball, lacrosse, soccer, softball, and track and field. The multimillion-dollar sports-complex on the campus of Benedictine University, in the Village of Lisle, Illinois is a collaborative effort between the university and the village. Located just outside Chicago, the sports-complex is home to the sport teams of Benedictine University Athletics. It was the home stadium of Chicago Red Stars women's soccer club from 2011 to 2015.

The stadium was home to Major League Lacrosse's Chicago Machine in their 2006 inaugural season. Local high schools host football and soccer games in the stadium. A baseball stadium and a softball stadium are also included in the complex. The baseball stadium is home to Benedictine University Eagles, the DuPage County Hounds of the Midwest Collegiate League, and the DuPage Pistol Shrimp of the Prospect League.

== Stadium complex ==
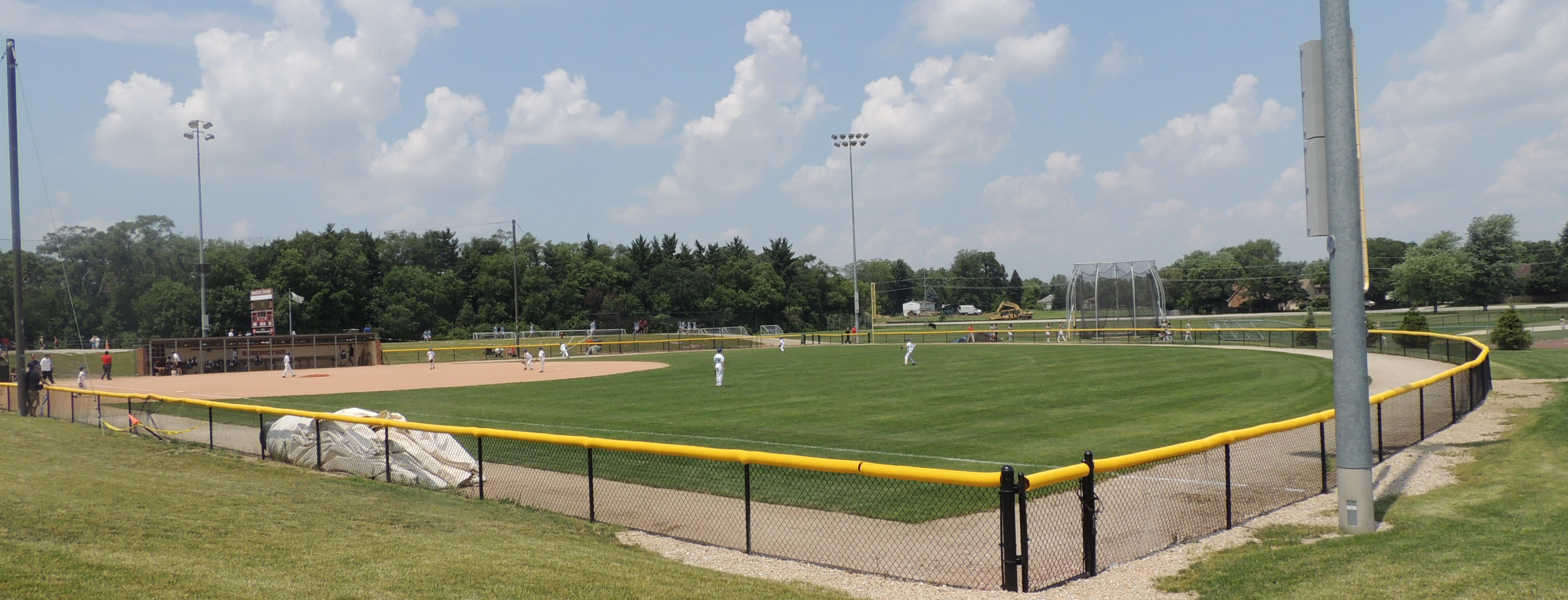
Benedictine University baseball practice field

The 3,000-seat main stadium for American football and soccer is also a athletics facility with an artificial playing surface, a nine-lane track, electronic scoreboard and message board, and electric lights. The main press box, four luxury suites, and viewing sundecks are above the seating gallery.

Natural grass practice fields and throwing venues for baseball and softball are directly adjacent to the main stadium. The baseball stadium seats 1,000, including 800 chairs, and has handicap accessible areas on the main concourse. The baseball field measures 325 feet to the outfield fence. Oversized dugouts allow for maximum player comfort. The stadium features a large electronic scoreboard and message board, and a public address system provides coverage to the stands and concourse.

The sports complex was built by Walsh Construction, and the architect was DLR Group.

The complex was completed in November 2004.

== Images ==
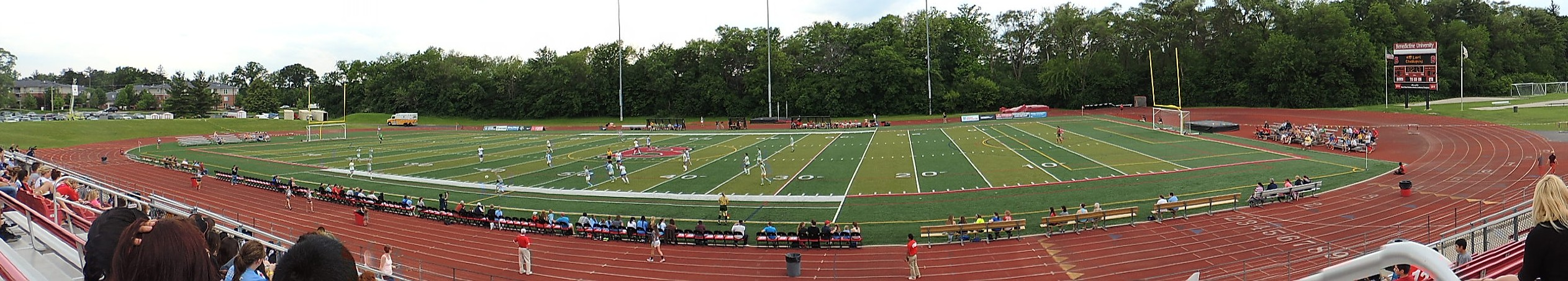
Benedictine University main stadium
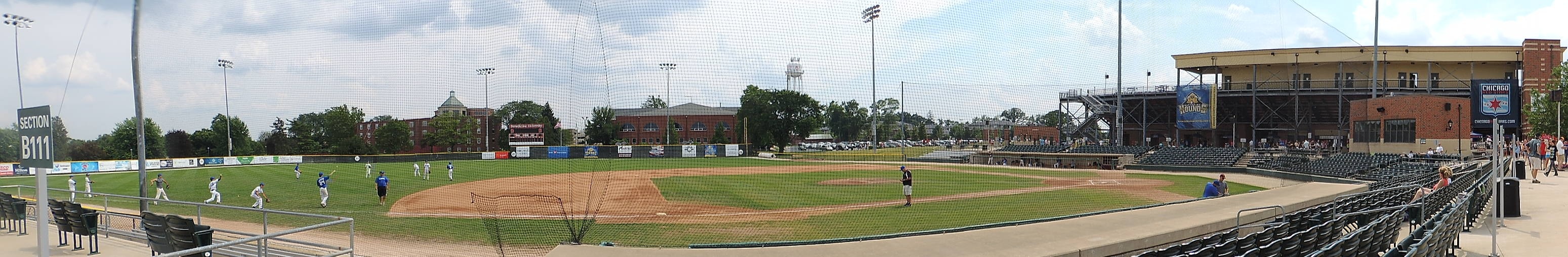
Benedictine University baseball stadium
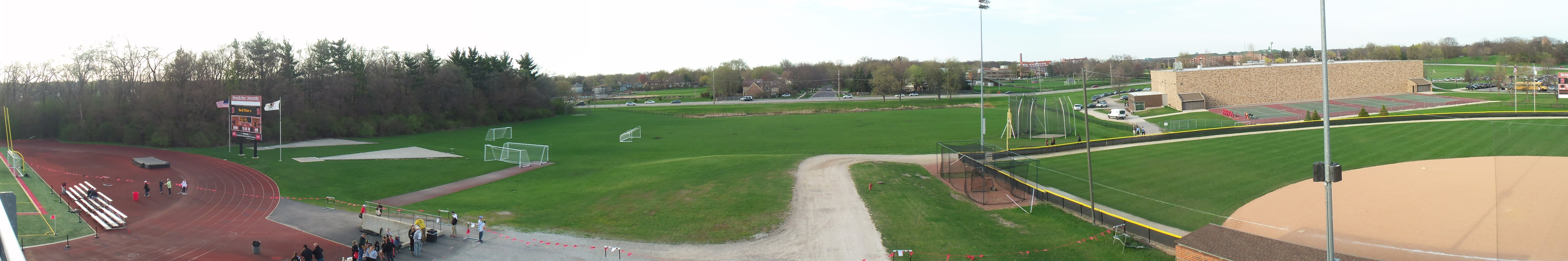
Facilities for field athletics north of the main stadium and baseball practice field

== See also ==
- Benedictine University
- Village of Lisle, Illinois
- Chicago Red Stars
