= Jillian Loyden =

American soccer player (born 1985)

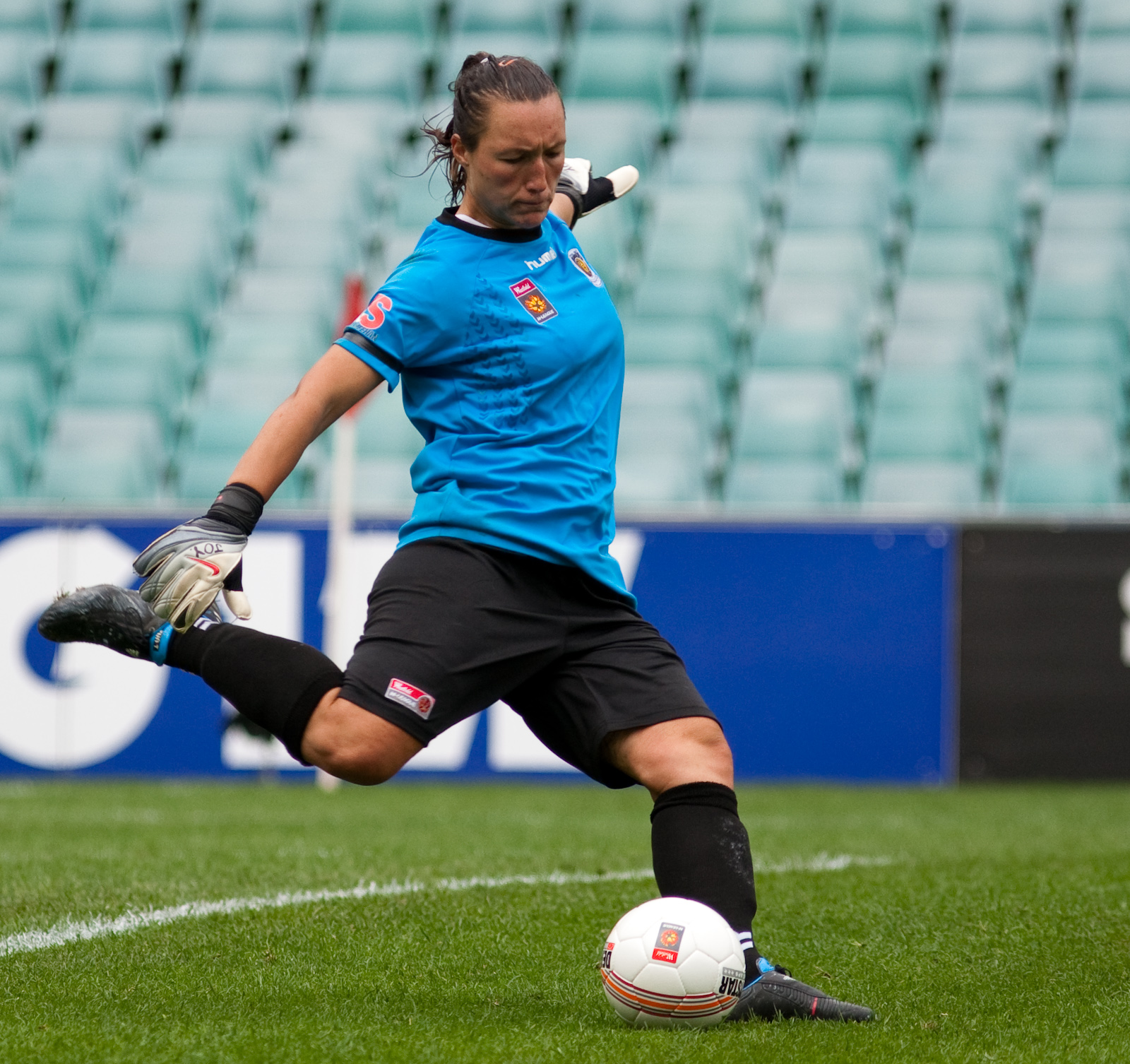

Personal information
- Full name: Jillian Ann Loyden
- Date of birth: June 25, 1985 (age 41)
- Height: 5 ft 10 in (1.78 m)
- Position: Goalkeeper

College career
Years	Team	Apps	(Gls)
2004–2007	Villanova Wildcats		

Senior career*
Years	Team	Apps	(Gls)
2007–2008	Jersey Sky Blue	21	(0)
2009	Saint Louis Athletica	3	(0)
2009	→ Central Coast Mariners (loan)		
2010	Chicago Red Stars	23	
2011	magicJack	8	(0)
2013–2014	Sky Blue FC	20	(0)
2016	Sky Blue FC	0	(0)

International career^{‡}
2010–2014	United States	10	(0)

Managerial career
- 2016: Sky Blue FC (assistant)
Medal record
Women's football
Representing the United States
FIFA Women's World Cup
Silver medal – second place	2011 Germany	Team
- * Club domestic league appearances and goals as of October 27, 2014 ‡ National team caps and goals as of October 6, 2014

Jillian Ann Loyden (born June 25, 1985) is an American retired soccer goalkeeper who most recently played for Sky Blue FC in the National Women's Soccer League and the United States women's soccer team. She previously played for the Saint Louis Athletica, Chicago Red Stars, and MagicJack in the WPS. She became an assistant coach for Sky Blue FC in 2016.

== Early life ==
A native of Vineland, New Jersey, Loyden played soccer and basketball at Vineland High School. She was named a first team All-State selection and was chosen as the Player of the Year by The Press of Atlantic City and The Daily Journal. She was also named the Daily Journal Player of the Year in 2001 and was a three-time All-South Jersey and All-Cape Atlantic League performer.

== Playing career ==
=== Collegiate career ===
Loyden attended Villanova University and majored in comprehensive science. She played goalkeeper for the Wildcats. During her senior year, she had a .891 save percentage (fourth in the United States), finished with a 0.52 goals-against average (10th in nation), and was named Big East Goalkeeper of the Year for the third straight season (a conference first) and named First-Team All-Big East. During her junior year, she was named NSCAA First-Team All-American First-Team All-Big East and was honored as the Big East Goalkeeper of the Year.

=== Club career ===
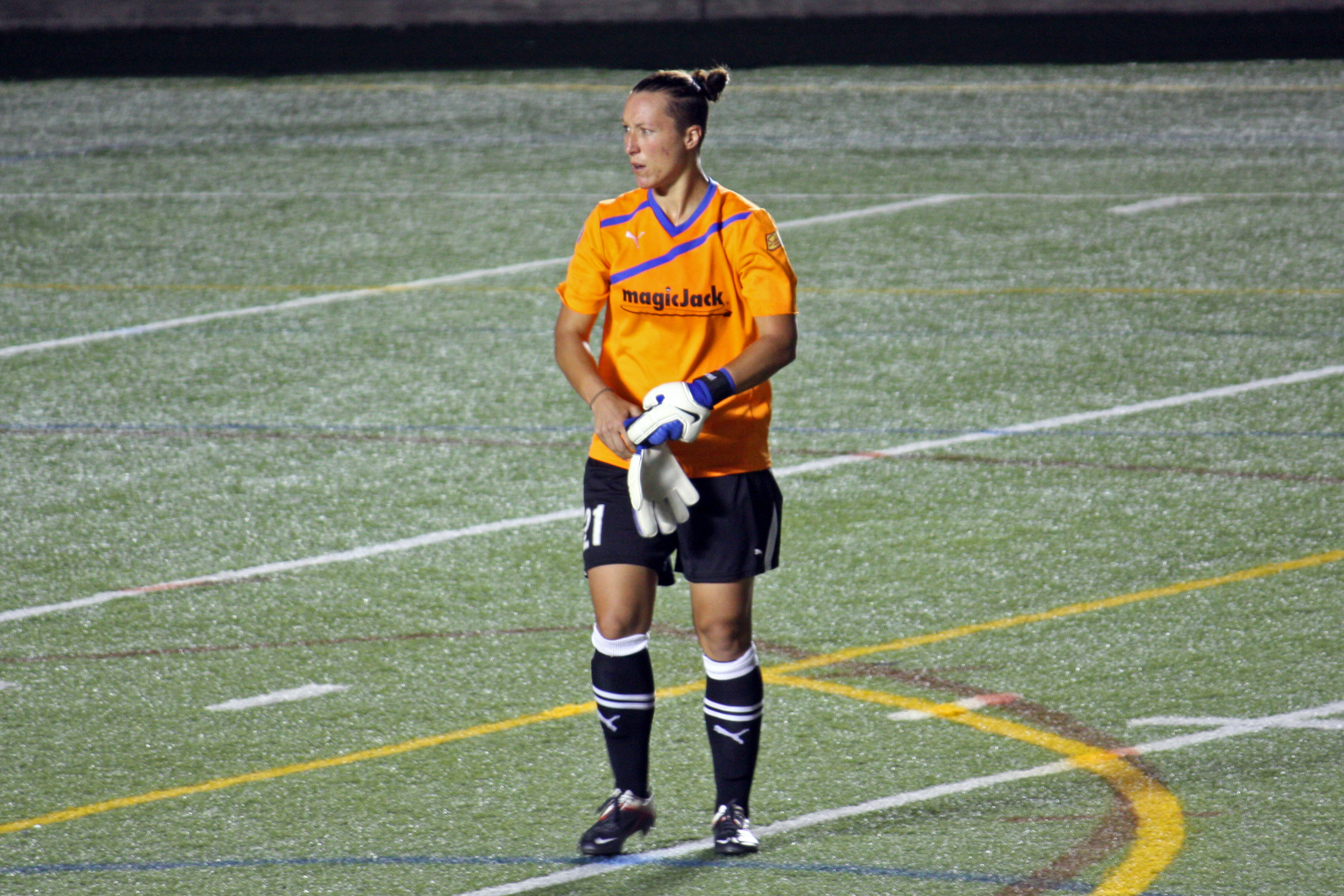
Magic Jack keeper Jill Loyden

In 2009, Loyden was drafted in the sixth round (37th overall) of the inaugural season of the Women's Professional Soccer. She was the back-up goalkeeper for Hope Solo on St. Louis Athletica. During her first appearance for St. Louis on May 23 in Chicago, she made six saves in a 2–0 win and was named WPS Player of the Week.

In 2010, Loyden was the starting goalkeeper for the Chicago Red Stars in the Women's Professional Soccer league, playing in 23 games while making 72 saves and compiling a 1.17 GAA.

In 2011, Loyden served as the goalkeeper for magicJack in the Women's Professional Soccer league. She started and played in eight regular season games helping the team to the WPS playoffs.

On January 11, 2013, she joined Sky Blue FC in the new National Women's Soccer League.

=== International career ===
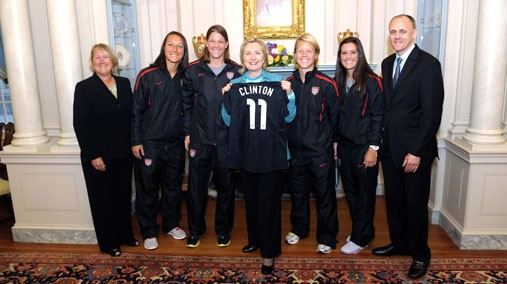
2011 United States women's national soccer team players, Jillian Loyden, Nicole Barnhart, Lori Lindsey, and Ali Krieger, with United States Secretary of State, Hillary Clinton.

Loyden made her first appearance for the United States women's national soccer team on October 2, 2010, in a game against China. In 2011, she earned a spot on her first world championship roster, making the Women's World Cup team as the third goalkeeper.

She was an alternate on the 2012 London Olympics roster, along with Christen Press, Lori Lindsey, and Meghan Klingenberg. After winning the gold medal, the team embarked on a "Victory Tour," during which Loyden was substituted in for Hope Solo in the 55th minute of the game against Costa Rica.

Loyden decided to retire from international soccer in October 2014, citing a need to focus on raising her nephew, whose mother (Loyden's younger sister Britton) was murdered by her fiancée in 2012.

== Coaching career ==
On February 4, 2016, Loyden was named an assistant coach for Sky Blue FC, where she had previously played in 2013–2014.
