= Ella Masar =

American soccer player (born 1986)

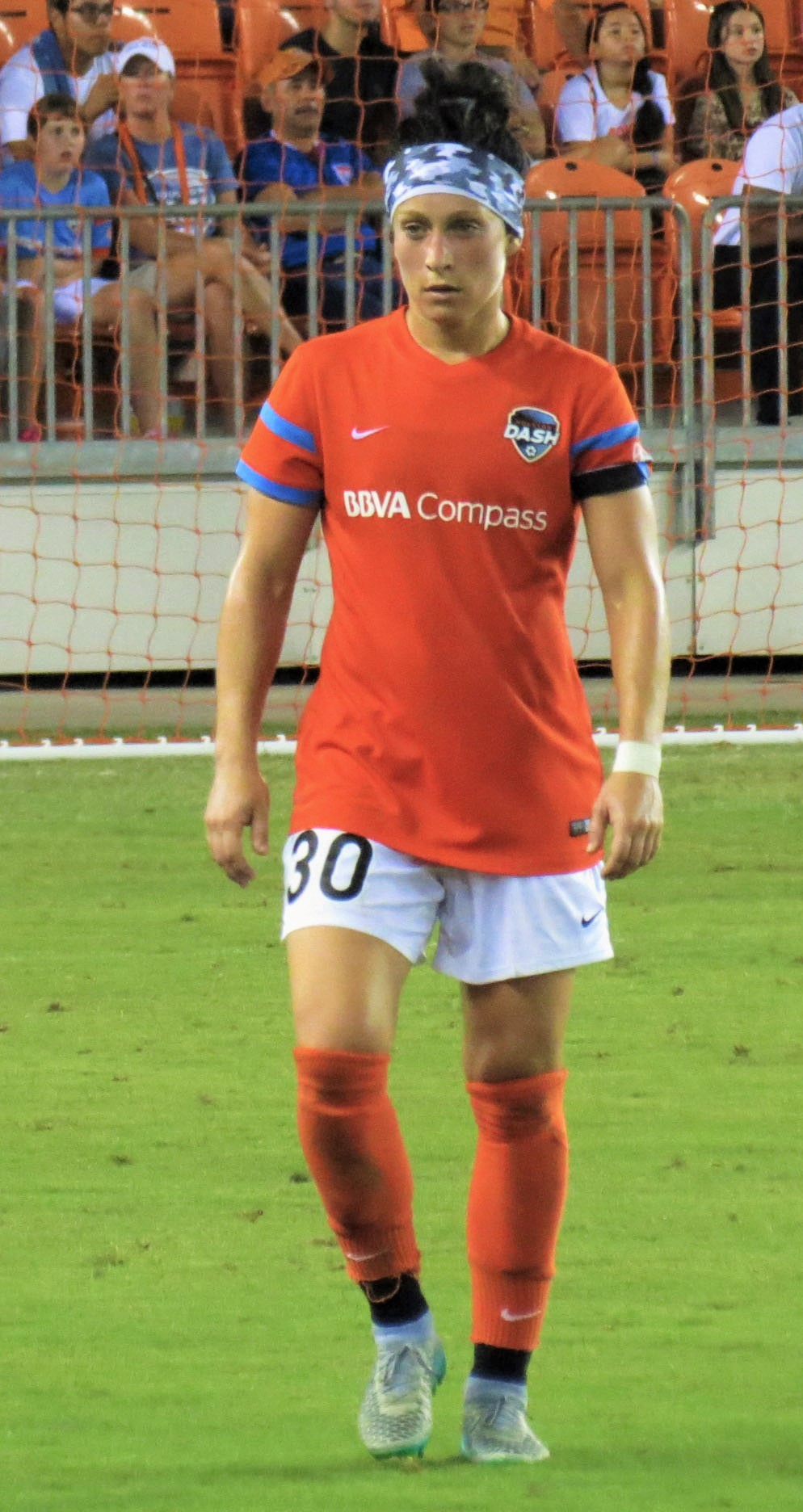
- Masar with the Houston Dash in 2015

Personal information
- Full name: Ella Copple Masar
- Date of birth: April 3, 1986 (age 40)
- Place of birth: Urbana, Illinois, U.S.
- Height: 5 ft 5 in (1.65 m)
- Positions: Winger; defender

Team information
- Current team: Chicago Red Stars (assistant)

College career
Years	Team	Apps	(Gls)
2004–2007	Illinois Fighting Illini		

Senior career*
Years	Team	Apps	(Gls)
2004	Windy City Bluez	1	(0)
2005–2006	Chicago Gaels	16	(10)
2007	Vancouver Whitecaps	8	(1)
2008	Washington Freedom	7	(3)
2008	Team Strømmen	9	(4)
2009–2010	Chicago Red Stars	38	(8)
2010	LSK Kvinner FK	6	(3)
2011	magicJack	16	(4)
2011–2012	Paris Saint-Germain	17	(6)
2013	Chicago Red Stars	20	(3)
2014–2015	Houston Dash	37	(5)
2016–2018	FC Rosengård	39	(26)
2018–2019	VfL Wolfsburg	19	(4)

International career
2007	United States U-21	12	(2)
2008–2009	United States U-23	8	(3)
2009	United States	1	(0)

Managerial career
- 2022–2023: Kansas City Current (assistant)
- 2023–: Chicago Stars (assistant)
- 2023: Chicago Stars (interim)
- 2025: Chicago Stars (interim)
- * Club domestic league appearances and goals

Ella Copple Masar (formerly Ella Masar McLeod; born April 3, 1986) is an American former professional soccer player who is currently an assistant coach for Chicago Stars FC of the National Women's Soccer League (NWSL). She previously played for FC Rosengård, Houston Dash, Chicago Red Stars, Paris Saint-Germain, magicJack, and VfL Wolfsburg. She made one appearance for the United States national team in 2009.

== Early life ==
Born in Urbana, Illinois, Masar attended Urbana High School, where she holds the school record for most goals in a season (40) and career (92). Masar also played club soccer for Little Illini Soccer Club (now Illinois FC). Her mother was diagnosed with bipolar disorder when Masar was a teen, and her parents later divorced. Her father died from a heart attack in October 2011 while Masar was playing in France.

=== University of Illinois ===
Masar enrolled at the University of Illinois in 2004. She was a college walk-on and played for the Fighting Illini for four years. In 2006, she was named Big Ten Offensive Player of the Year and NSCAA Second Team All-American. During Masar's senior year, she was named All-Big Ten First Team and Lowe's All-American First Team. Over the course of the 2007 season, Masar tallied 12 goals and 3 assists. Throughout her career, Masar compiled a total of 20 assists—the second most in the program's history—and 27 goals.

== Club career ==
=== W-League ===
Masar started to play in the W-League in 2004 with Windy City Bluez. She appeared in just one game for the team, playing the full 90 minutes.

In 2005, Masar switched to the Chicago Gaels, for whom she appeared in seven games for (650 minutes). She scored 9 goals and added an assist. She stayed with the team the following season and played in 9 more games (791 minutes). In 2006, she scored 1 goal and 1 assist.

Vancouver Whitecaps marked the next stop for Masar, who played for the Canadian team in 2007. She appeared alongside Cori Alexander, Tiffeny Milbrett, Jill Oakes, and McCall Zerboni. She played in eight games (632 minutes) and scored one goal and assisted on five others.

Masar moved to Washington Freedom in 2008, where she appeared in seven games (321 minutes) and scored three goals, while helping the Freedom to a first-place finish in the Northeast Division.

=== Team Strømmen, 2008 ===
After the 2008 W-League season, Masar played in Norway with Team Strømmen for part of the 2008 Toppserien. She scored four goals in nine Toppserien appearances. The team advanced to the Norwegian Cup final, where they lost to Røa IL, 3–1. Masar scored Strømmen's sole goal in the final.

=== Chicago Red Stars, 2009–2010 ===
With the introduction of top-flight women's soccer back to the United States in the form of Women's Professional Soccer, Masar declared herself eligible for the WPS. She was drafted in the second round (9th overall) to the Chicago Red Stars in the 2008 WPS General Draft on October 6, 2008. In the inaugural 2009 Women's Professional Soccer season, Masar appeared in 16 games (five starts, 655 minutes) and recorded two assists. However, her season was hampered by a hip injury sustained on June 7, 2009 during a match against FC Gold Pride, which resulted in four torn muscles.

It was announced on September 28, 2009 that Masar's contract option had been picked up by Chicago, who held her playing rights for the 2010 Women's Professional Soccer season. In September 2010 Masar returned to Team Strømmen, who had changed their name to LSK Kvinner FK, for part of the 2010 Toppserien. She scored three goals in six Toppserien games.

=== magicJack and Paris Saint-Germain, 2011 ===
During the 2011 WPS season, Masar played for magicJack. She made 16 appearances for the club and scored 4 goals. Masar was the only player to condemn publicly the team owner, Dan Borislow, accusing him of mistreating players, including her.

Masar played with Paris Saint-Germain for the 2011–2012 season. She made 17 appearances (1107 minutes) and scored six goals.

=== Chicago Red Stars, 2012–2013 ===
Masar rejoined the Red Stars for the 2012 WPSLE season, and was re-signed by the Stars for the 2013 NWSL season.

=== Houston Dash, 2014–2015 ===
Masar was left unprotected by the Chicago Red Stars during the 2014 NWSL Expansion Draft and on January 10, 2014 was one of 10 players selected by the Houston Dash.

In the 2015 season, Masar took over as Dash captain from her girlfriend Erin McLeod (whom Masar married in July 2015), who was on Canada's 2015 FIFA Women's World Cup squad.

In November 2015, the Dash waived Masar at her request. She cited a desire to be close to McLeod, who was pursuing a chance to play for a club competing in the UEFA Women's Champions League. Masar ended her time with the Dash with 37 appearances and 5 goals.

=== FC Rosengård, 2016–2018 ===
In December 2015, FC Rosengård announced the signing of Masar for the 2016 season. McLeod had previously told the press that the two would be playing together in Sweden. For the 2016 season she was tied, with Marta, for most goals. As of October 17, 2017 she has tied her season high of 13 goals from last year, and is tied for 2nd with most goals in Sweden's Damallsvenskan. There are 3 league games remaining.

=== VfL Wolfsburg, 2018–2019 ===
At the beginning of 2018, Masar signed with VfL Wolfsburg until 2019 on a free transfer from FC Rosengård.

== International career ==
Masar's international career began in 2007 with the U-21 Women's National Team. She appeared in 12 games, scoring two goals and adding an assist. In 2008, the U-21 team switched to being a U-23 team. For the newly re-branded U-23 Women's National Team, Masar appeared in eight games and scored three goals, her last appearance coming in 2009 before she became ineligible due to age.

Masar's made her debut for the United States women's national soccer team on October 29, 2009 against Germany, where she was a 73rd-minute substitute for Amy Rodriguez. Masar and Kacey White were late additions to the squad due to the retirement of Angela Hucles and an injury to Megan Rapinoe.

== Coaching career ==
=== Kansas City Current ===
Masar joined the coaching staff of National Women's Soccer League club Kansas City Current on February 7, 2022.

=== Chicago Stars FC ===
In January 2023, she joined the Chicago Red Stars (later renamed Chicago Stars FC) as an assistant coach. In October 2023, she served as the Red Stars' interim head coach for the final game of the season following Chris Petrucelli's departure from the club. She returned to an assistant coaching role following that game before being summoned to serve as interim head coach again on July 3, 2025. She again returned to an assistant coaching role in September 2025 with the hire of Anders Jacobson as a new interim head coach.

== Personal life ==
Masar is a Christian. Masar came out as a lesbian on March 17, 2015. On July 6, 2015, Masar married Canadian teammate Erin McLeod in Vancouver following the 2015 FIFA Women's World Cup. The two co-hosted a regular online web show called The Ella and Erin Show while playing for the Chicago Red Stars and later the Houston Dash in order to promote home games and give away tickets to fans. Masar and McLeod underwent an amicable separation in 2019, followed by divorce.

Masar is currently in a relationship with German soccer player Babett Peter. In September 2020, Masar gave birth to a baby boy. Masar and Peter married on July 21, 2022.

An American citizen by birth, Masar received Canadian citizenship on December 29, 2015, by virtue of her previous marriage to McLeod.

In 2019, Masar co-founded Doyenne Sport, an agency for female footballers.

== Honors ==
FC Rosengård

- Svenska Cupen: 2016–17, 2017–18

VfL Wolfsburg

- Frauen-Bundesliga: 2018–19
- DFB Pokal: 2018–19
