= Chicago Stars FC =

American professional soccer club

- Founded: 2006; 20 years ago
- Stadium: Martin Stadium; Evanston, Illinois
- Capacity: 12,023
- Majority owner: Laura Ricketts
- Chairperson: Laura Ricketts
- Interim Head coach: Karina Báez
- League: National Women's Soccer League
- 2026: Regular season: 16th of 16; Playoffs: DNQ
- Website: chicagostars.com
Home colors	Away colors

Chicago Stars Football Club is an American professional soccer team based in the Chicago metropolitan area that competes in the National Women's Soccer League (NWSL). The Chicago Stars were a founding member of the Women's Professional Soccer (WPS) league under the name the Chicago Red Stars. They have played in the NWSL since 2013. The Stars play their home games at Martin Stadium. They have reached the NWSL Championship twice in 2019 and 2021.

The team played in WPS in 2009 and 2010. After leaving WPS in December 2010 due to the club's financial issues, the club joined the Women's Premier Soccer League (WPSL) for the 2011 season. In 2012, the Red Stars co-founded and played in Women's Premier Soccer League Elite (WPSL-E): a one-year league which bridged the WPS and the NWSL. The club became a founding member of the NWSL, which was financially supported by the United States Soccer Federation, in 2012. In October 2022, they held the record for the longest active playoff streak (2015–2022) in the NWSL.

It was announced on August 15, 2023 that a group of Chicago business leaders led by Laura Ricketts had agreed in principle to purchase the Chicago Red Stars. On September 1, 2023, it was announced that the club had been acquired for $60 million by the group led by Ricketts.

On October 23, 2024, the team announced a name change to "Chicago Stars Football Club" to take effect during the 2024–25 offseason.

== History ==
=== Women's Professional Soccer ===
==== Establishment ====
In 2006, it was announced that Chicago would field a team in a new women's professional soccer league. The team joined six others (Washington Freedom, Boston Breakers, Los Angeles Sol, FC Gold Pride, Sky Blue FC, and Saint Louis Athletica) in Women's Professional Soccer (WPS) for the league's inaugural season in 2009. Marcia McDermott, former head coach of the Northwestern University women's soccer team and the Women's United Soccer Association's Carolina Courage, was named as the Red Stars' general manager.

On June 3, 2008, the "Red Stars" name was announced at a Toyota Park ceremony. The name refers to the four six-pointed red stars on the flag of Chicago. Each star represents a landmark event in Chicago history: Fort Dearborn, the Great Chicago Fire, the 1893 World's Fair, and the 1933 World's Fair. Other names considered were Progress, Towers, Union, Blues, 1871, and Wind. "Red Stars" was chosen by popular vote in a two-month fan poll.

==== 2009 season ====
The Red Stars won their first game of the season, 1–0, at Saint Louis Athletica. They followed with two ties (1–1 at Washington Freedom and 0–0 hosting Sky Blue FC) and a 4–0 shutout of the Boston Breakers at Toyota Park. This was the best starting record of any team in the league except season champions Los Angeles Sol, seeming to live up to preseason predictions.

The team was then winless for its next nine games (with three away draws), including a 451-minute scoring drought. The Washington Freedom, scored first in their next game, indicating that the streak would continue. However, the Red Stars came from behind to win 2–1. They defeated last-place FC Gold Pride 3–1 in their next game before losing four of their last five games, eliminating them from the playoffs and ending the season in sixth place. The Red Stars finished second in league attendance in 2009, behind the LA Sol.

Agreeing to see the Red Stars through their first season, Peter Wilt stepped down as CEO at the end of 2009 to become general manager of the Milwaukee Wave (his hometown NISL team). General manager Marcia McDermott assumed many of Wilt's responsibilities, although he continued to support the team on the league's board of governors and as president of the Chicago Red Stars Charitable Foundation.

==== 2010 season ====
The Red Stars began their second season with high hopes and new faces. They lost their first game at Sky Blue FC 1–0, after dominating much of the game. A 1–1 home tie in their second game earned the Stars their first point of the season. After a successful season, the team left WPS on December 13 because they were unable to meet the league's funding requirements for the 2011 season; the league folded in 2011 for financial and legal reasons.

=== 2011 Women's Premier Soccer League season ===
The Red Stars joined the Women's Premier Soccer League in 2011. They played their home games at Village of Lisle-Benedictine University Sports Complex, in west-suburban Chicago.

The roster consisted of players from the women's national team U-20 and U-23 pools and collegiate players. The first players announced included three with WPS experience, including two from the Red Stars' 2010 squad. The team was coached by Chicago native Rory Dames, and continued their activity in the Chicago soccer community through their soccer camps.

The Red Stars finished the regular season with a 10–1 record, hosting the playoff semifinals and championship matches. Defeating Tampa Bay Hellenic 2–1 in their semifinal, they lost in overtime by the same score in the final to the Orange County Waves (another WPSL team with WPS connections; Brittany Klein, a 2009–10 Red Stars player, was on the Waves).

=== 2012 Women's Premier Soccer League Elite season ===
In 2012, the Red Stars joined the former WPS Boston Breakers and Western New York Flash to found the WPSL Elite League. Five other former WPSL teams joined the league: ASA Chesapeake Charge, F.C. Indiana, New England Mutiny, New York Fury, and Philadelphia Fever.

The Red Stars finished fourth in the league, making the playoffs. They advanced to the final, where they lost to the Flash in a 2–4 penalty shootout after a 1–1 draw at the end of extra time. Red Stars Ella Masar and Lori Chalupny were injured on the same play in the 33rd minute. WNY scored the equalizer in regulation with a 40-yard goal in the 97th minute to reach overtime. The Red Stars won the 2012 National Women's Cup with half their roster, since the cup final was played at the same time as their final WPSL Elite regular-season match against the eventual third-place New York Fury.

=== National Women's Soccer League ===
In November 2012, the Red Stars co-founded and was one of the original eight teams in a yet-to-be-named women's professional soccer league in concert with United States Soccer Federation, the Canadian Soccer Association, and the Mexican Football Federation. The league began competition in spring 2013.

==== 2013 season ====
All NWSL teams received an allocation of USWNT players, and the Red Stars received Shannon Boxx, Amy LePeilbet, and Keelin Winters; only Boxx had limited playing time that season. The Red Stars began the season with two draws and four losses. The mid-season arrival of Germans Sonja Fuss and Inka Grings revived the team somewhat, but not enough to qualify for the playoffs. The Red Stars played 22 matches with eight wins, six draws, and eight losses to finish the season in sixth place.

==== 2014 season ====
In 2014, the Red Stars finished in fifth place. The club was waiting for United States international player Christen Press to join after completing her commitment to a European club, and the Canadian international player Melissa Tancredi to gain full fitness after college. The team signed two other internationals, Abby Erceg and Emily van Egmond, in May. Despite the late arrival of international stars, at the end of May the team had six wins, one draw, and two losses; its performance was aided by rookies Julie Johnston, Vanessa DiBernardo, Hayley Brock, young players Jen Hoy, Rachel Quon, veterans Lori Chalupny and Michelle Wenino, and goalkeeper Karina LeBlanc. With a mid-season slump (one win in 11 matches during June and July), the team did not qualify for the playoffs and was edged out by head-to-head results with the Washington Spirit.

==== 2015 season ====
The Red Stars began the 2015 season with three home games: a 3–2 win over the previous season's Supporting Shield winner Seattle Reign FC, a 2–2 draw with Portland Thorns FC, and a 1–0 win against Sky Blue FC. Christen Press scored four of the club's first five goals, and was named the April Player of the Month. Red Stars who were also members of the national team were training for the 2015 FIFA Women's World Cup during weeks five and six. Rookie Sofia Huerta scored multiple goals in two matches, and was named the NWSL Player of the Week for weeks five and six and the May NWSL Player of the Month. The team was in first place from week four to week 13 of the regular season, ultimately finishing second. In the playoffs, they lost the semi-final to FC Kansas City.

==== 2016 season ====
The team ended the regular season in third place, and advanced to the playoffs. They played the semi-final at Boyds, Maryland against the Washington Spirit on September 30, losing 2–1. The Red Stars returned to Toyota Park for home games for the first time since their 2010 WPS season.

==== 2017 season ====
For the third consecutive season, the Red Stars made the post-season playoffs. They were eliminated in the semi-final, losing 1–0 to the North Carolina Courage in Cary with a goal in the 89th minute.

==== 2018 season ====
For the team's tenth season and sixth in the NWSL, the team qualified for the fourth consecutive year for the playoffs and lost 2–0 in the semifinal to the North Carolina Courage.

==== 2019 season ====
The Red Stars made the finals for the first time in NWSL history, clinching their fifth consecutive playoff spot on September 21, 2019, after defeating the Washington Spirit 3–1. Forward Sam Kerr scored her 18th goal of the season in that game, breaking the record for goals scored in an NWSL season which she had set with Sky Blue FC in 2017. The Red Stars defeated the Portland Thorns 1–0 in a semifinal home game, and lost 4–0 to the North Carolina Courage in the final. Their season record was 14 wins, two draws, and eight losses.

==== 2021 season ====
Chicago ended their season in fourth place, becoming the first team in the NWSL to make the playoffs for six consecutive seasons. At the end of the regular season, the Red Stars named defender Sarah Gorden the team's first Iron Woman, an honor awarded for playing every minute of the season. The Red Stars faced the Washington Spirit at the NWSL Championship, held in Louisville, but lost 2–1 on overtime.

On Monday, November 22, 2021, just after midnight, the Red Stars announced that head coach Rory Dames had resigned effective immediately. Later that day, The Washington Post sports reporter Molly Hensley-Clancy reported that prior to resigning, The Post had approached the Red Stars Front Office with allegations from players, both previous and current, of abuse by Dames. The Post also provided documentation of reports made to United States Soccer Federation by players such as Christen Press as far back as 2014, detailing abuse, harassment, and inappropriate use of his power as head coach to manipulate players. “Three former Red Stars players, including one who played on the team at the time of the investigation, told The Post that they had wanted to speak to U.S. Soccer investigators but had never heard from them,” reported Hensley-Clancy. “Two had left the team because of Dames's abuse, they said.”

==== 2022 season ====
A busy offseason saw the Red Stars trade Makenzy Doniak, Katie Johnson and 2021 college draftee Kelsey Turnbow who never played in a Red Stars uniform to San Diego Wave FC for protection in the 2022 NWSL Expansion Draft. The Red Stars also traded 2021 Iron women Sarah Gorden and the rights to USWNT player Julie Ertz to Angel City FC for expansion draft protection. The Red Stars also traded Nikki Stanton to OL Reign and backup goalkeeper Cassie Miller to Kansas City Current. The Red Stars drafted five players in the 2022 NWSL Draft and rostered three of the five: Ava Cook, Sammi Fisher and Sarah Griffith. The Red Stars welcomed back Yuki Nagasato from Louisville. Additionally, Kealia Watt was coming off of an ACL injury, and later announced she was pregnant, Sarah Woldmoe was pregnant and it seemed like it would be a long season for the Red Stars. The new head coach was announced as Chris Petrucelli. In the 2022 NWSL Challenge Cup the Red Stars finished 2nd in the Central Division behind the Kansas City Current and did not move on. In the 2022 National Women's Soccer League season the Red Stars finished 6th to clinch the final playoff spot and move on for the 7th consecutive season. This was decided after a 2–0 victory over Angel City FC. In the playoffs, the Red Stars traveled to San Diego and lost 2–1 in extra time after Alex Morgan scored her 16th goal of the regular season. Mallory Pugh finished as the team's leader in scoring (11 goals) and assists (6). She was named to the Best XI while Tatumn Milazzo was named to the 2nd Best XI. The Red Stars finished the year with a record of 11W, 8D and 10L.

== Crest and colors ==
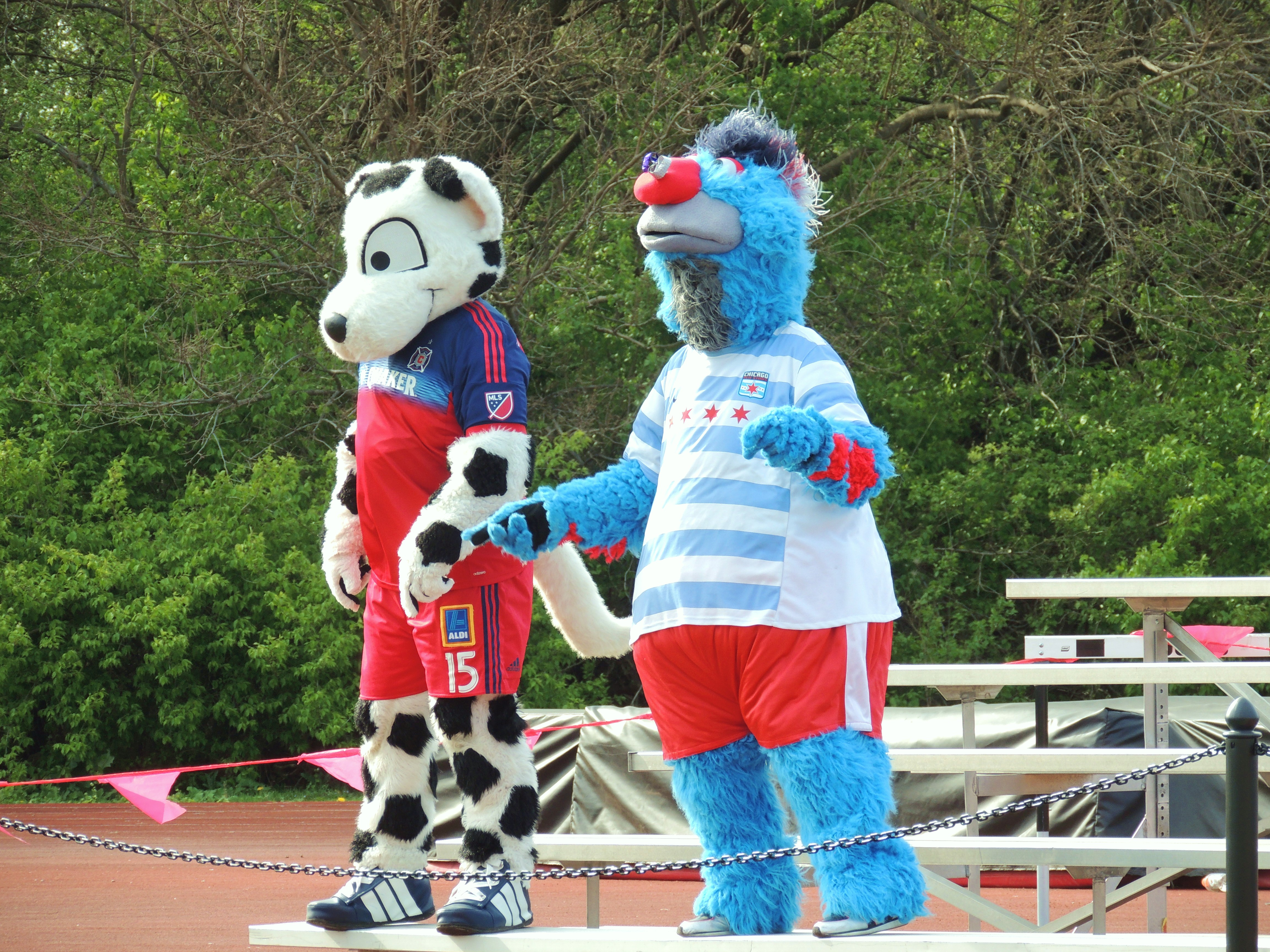
Chicago Fire mascot Sparky at a Stars game with Supernova, the Stars mascot

The club's original primary logo combined two Chicago images; the shape of the shield is taken from its equivalent in Chicago's city seal. The colors, stripes, and stars in the logo are inspired by the symbolism of Chicago's municipal flag, with the blue stripes representing the two branches of the Chicago River.

In 2017, the club's primary and secondary logos were updated with a design created by Julie Rochelle.

In October 2024, the team announced they would be adopting a new crest and colors in conjunction with the change in team name to "Chicago Stars Football Club". The new crest has only one red star instead of four, includes two shades of blue, and "includes a curved marquee shape as a homage to the many theaters in Chicago, as well as the classic marquee of the Cubs' Wrigley Field stadium."

== Stadiums ==
During the team's membership in Women's Professional Soccer, the Chicago Red Stars played at Toyota Park. Now known as SeatGeek Stadium, it is a 20,000-seat soccer-specific stadium which was the home of the Chicago Fire FC from 2006 to 2019. From 2011 to 2015, in the Women's Premier Soccer League, Women's Premier Soccer League Elite league and National Women's Soccer League, the Red Stars played at the 3,000-seat Village of Lisle-Benedictine University Sports Complex.

During the club's 2012 WPSL Elite season, some matches were played at the Concordia University Chicago Athletic Complex in River Forest, Illinois and the Lakeside Athletic Field at Northwestern University in Evanston, Illinois (today known as Martin Stadium) due to renovation at Benedictine University. In December 2015, the Chicago Red Stars announced their return to Toyota Park for their 2016 NWSL home games.

In September 2025, with the club's lease at SeatGeek Stadium in Bridgeview set to expire, the Stars announced they would play the 2026 season at Northwestern Medicine Field at Martin Stadium.

== Ownership ==
FC Indiana owners Gary Weaver, Dale Weaver, and Shek Borkowski began the idea for what started as "Chicago Professional Women's Soccer” and eventually became the Chicago Red Stars. The FC Indiana owners brought in Peter Wilt to lead their efforts in establishing the team, and they assembled a broad ownership group.

=== WPS (2009–2010) ===
The Chicago Professional Women's Soccer investor group owned the Red Stars from 2009 to 2010, during the team's membership in Women's Professional Soccer. The team's 2009 management group was Gary Weaver, Jim Willett, Arnim Whisler, and Peter Wilt. The teams's 2010 management group was Gary Weaver, Jim Willett, and Arnim Whisler. The Illinois Women's Soccer League (IWSL) was a partner. In addition to the IWSL, the team ownership included shareholders John (Jack) Cummins, Robert and Susan Morrison, Jim and Kathi Willett, Dale Weaver, Gary Weaver, Pin Ni, Dong Li, Arnim Whisler, Dean Egerter, Stephen Ritchie and Peter Wilt.

=== WPSL (2011), WPSL E (2012), and NWSL (2013–2020) ===
Arnim Whisler took over the team after the 2010 season, and continued to operate it for the 2011 season in the WPSL while helping to reorganize the WPS. Whisler remained its sole owner until 2021.

=== NWSL (2021–present) ===
On March 1, 2021, the Red Stars announced a new ownership group led by co-founder (and majority owner) Arnim Whisler and his family. In addition to Whisler, the ownership group is led by founding members Dean Egerter and Steve Ritchie and includes additional members Jessie Becker, Julie Haddon, Israel Idonije, Jordan Levin, Abel Lezcano, Colleen Mares, Michael Raimondi, Kendall Coyne Schofield, Michael Schofield, Sarah Spain, Marie Tillman, Brian Walsh, Kevin Willer, and David M. Zapata. On May 4, 2021, the Red Stars announced further additions to the club's ownership group, including Aimee Garcia, Josh Dixon, Bela Bajaria, Channing Dungey and spouse Scott Power, Keli Lee, Devin Johnson and daughter Carys Johnson, Ken Kaufman, Nora Mabie, Kim Vender Moffat, Stephen Moffat, Todd Vender, Nick Coleman, Jon Moonves, Jim Allen, Graham Allen, and Kirk Allen. On August 18, 2022, the NWSL announced that it had hired Haddon as chief marketing officer, and that Haddon had divested from the Red Stars prior to taking the job.

On October 10, 2022, Red Stars players called on Whisler to sell the club. The letter followed the publication of reports of his role in the 2021 NWSL abuse scandal. Whisler announced on December 5 that he would sell the team, and that investment bank Inner Circle Sports would facilitate the sale.

On September 1, 2023, Whisler and all minority owners of the Red Stars sold their stakes to an investment group led by Laura Ricketts and including Angela E.L. Barnes, Traci P. Beck, Pittsburgh Penguins partner Debra Cafaro, Laura Desmond, Sidney Dillard, Megan Murphy, Editha Paras, Jennifer Pritzker, Hilary Rosen, Jessica Droste Yagan, Tom O'Reilly, and the Engelhardt family. The transaction valued the team at $35.5 million and included an additional $25 million in investment into club operations.

== Supporters group ==
Chicago Local 134 is the Supporters group for the Chicago Stars. Chicago Local 134 was founded in 2009 during the WPSL days. The name comes from Chicago's ties and rich history with unions. The number "134" was the original supporters section in Bridgeview during the WPSL era. Currently, Local 134 can be found drumming/chanting and waving flags behind the goal in section 118 at SeatGeek Stadium. Local 134 Tailgates prior to home games in the NW corner of the East Lot. For more information on the group/membership/events you can visit Chicago Local 134's website, and also find the supporters group on Instagram and blue sky with the handle @chicagolocal134.

== Broadcasting ==
It was announced on April 17, 2019 that NBC Sports Chicago would be the Red Stars' new regional broadcaster, televising all regular-season matches (beginning with their second match of the 2019 season). Seven 2019 matches were scheduled to be carried on its overflow channel, NBC Sports Chicago Plus.

On August 23, 2021, the Red Stars announced that Univision Chicago would simulcast Spanish-language coverage of the club's September 25 match against Portland Thorns FC on WXFT-DT and WRTO AM.

The team later moved to Marquee Sports Network for the 2024 season, before transitioning to WFLD-TV the following season, with Marquee retaining reruns and other coverage.

== Rory Dames/Arnim Whisler scandal ==
On November 22, 2021, The Washington Post published an article with allegations from players, both previous and current, of abuse by head coach Rory Dames. The Post provided documentation of reports made to the United States Soccer Federation by players, including Christen Press, as far back as 2014, detailing abuse, harassment, and inappropriate use of power as head coach to manipulate players.

"Three former Red Stars players, including one who played on the team at the time of the investigation, told The Post that they had wanted to speak to U.S. Soccer investigators but had never heard from them," reported Molly Hensley-Clancy. "Two had left the team because of Dames's abuse, they said."

In February 2022, the Washington Post published a follow-up story reporting claims of misconduct dating back to the late 1990s, including a 1998 police report involving a youth player Dames coached at Chicago Eclipse Select. The allegations went further, including multiple players claiming to have had a sexual relationship with Dames when they played for him at Eclipse. An accuser claimed that sex "felt almost expected". The verbal abuse also included constant name-calling.

Dames' role in the founding of Elite Clubs National League, an elite group of youth soccer clubs of which he sat on the Board of Directors, and his role with the Chicago Red Stars and NWSL, played a role in players not speaking up, according to accusers. Players and parents were afraid Dames "could ruin the chance at a scholarship or a spot in the professional league" if they spoke up. An accuser said that "the monopoly over Chicago soccer, our belief that his connection to the college world was the only connection we would have — he used all of that to get away with doing and saying whatever the hell he wanted to us."

Initially, Arnim Whisler, the owner and chairman of the Red Stars, denied any knowledge of or complicity in Dames's abuse, claiming that "I have always strived to ensure that everyone hired in our environment is of high character and shares our positive values." However, an investigation by former U.S. Attorney General Sally Yates revealed that not only had Whisler known about Dames's abusive behavior for years, but he had chosen to ignore it, given Dames's successful record as a coach. Yates's investigation also found that Whisler neglected to run a background check on Dames before hiring him. On October 4, 2022, the day after Yates's report was released, Whisler resigned from the NWSL Board of Directors, giving up operational control of the Red Stars. On December 2, 2022, Whisler announced his intention to sell the team. On January 9, 2023, Whisler and the Red Stars were fined $1.5 million, and Dames was banned from ever coaching in the NWSL again.

== Team standings and statistics ==
=== Key ===
- WPS = Women's Professional Soccer
- WPSL = Women's Premier Soccer League
- WPSL E = Women's Premier Soccer League Elite
- NWSL = National Women's Soccer League
- DNQ = Did not qualify
- DNE = Did not enter
Champions
Runners-up

=== Seasons ===
Results of league and cup competitions by season
Season	Division	P	W	D	L	F	A	Pts	Pos	League Playoffs	Challenge Cup	Open Cup
Season	Regular season									League Playoffs	Challenge Cup	Open Cup
2009	WPS	20	5	5	10	18	25	20	6th	DNQ		DNE
2010	WPS	24	7	6	11	21	27	27	6th (Note: In 2010, only seven teams finished the season.)	DNQ		DNE
2011	WPSL	10	8	1	1	38	7	25	1st (Note: The Chicago Red Stars competed in the North Division of the Midwest Conference in the WPSL. Six teams were in this division for the 2011 season.)	Runners-up		DNE
2012	WPSL E	14	9	1	4	26	11	28	4th	Runners-up		Winners
2013	NWSL	22	8	6	8	32	36	30	6th	DNQ		DNE
2014	NWSL	24	9	8	7	32	26	35	5th	DNQ		DNE
2015	NWSL	20	8	9	3	31	22	33	2nd	Semifinals		DNE
2016	NWSL	20	9	6	5	24	20	33	3rd	Semifinals		DNE
2017	NWSL	24	11	6	7	33	30	39	4th	Semifinals		
2018	NWSL	24	9	10	5	38	28	37	4th	Semifinals		
2019	NWSL	24	14	2	8	41	28	44	2nd	Runners-up		
2020	NWSL	Regular season cancelled due to COVID-19 pandemic									Runners-up	
2021	NWSL	24	11	5	8	28	28	38	4th	Runners-up	Group stage	
2022	NWSL	22	9	6	7	34	28	33	6th	1st round	Group stage	
2023	NWSL	22	7	3	12	28	50	24	12th	DNQ	Group stage	
2024	NWSL	26	10	2	14	31	38	32	8th	1st round	DNQ	
2025	NWSL	26	3	11	12	32	54	20	14th	DNQ	DNQ	

== Players and coaches ==
=== Current squad ===
As of November 18, 2026.

No.	Pos.	Player	Nation
1	GK	USA	Alyssa Naeher (captain)
3	DF	USA	Sam Staab
4	FW	USA	Jenna Bike
5	DF	NGR	Michelle Alozie
6	DF	ESP	Oihane Valdezate
7	MF	CAN	Julia Grosso
9	FW	USA	Mallory Swanson
10	MF	USA	Brianna Pinto
11	FW	POR	Nádia Gomes
12	DF	FIN	Natalia Kuikka
14	DF	USA	Taylor Wood
15	DF	USA	Elise Evans
18	FW	USA	Simone Charley
20	MF	USA	Bea Franklin
22	GK	USA	Halle Mackiewicz
23	FW	USA	Micayla Johnson
24	FW	USA	Ryan Connaughton
25	DF	MEX	Aaliyah Farmer
27	GK	USA	Katie Atkinson
28	MF	USA	Emma Egizii
31	MF	GER	Anna Gasper
34	MF	USA	Tessa Dellarose
77	MF	ESP	Maitane López
99	FW	CAN	Jordyn Huitema
—	DF	USA	Kerry Abello
—	FW	ZAM	Racheal Kundananji

==== Out on loan ====
No.	Pos.	Player	Nation
2	DF	USA	Sam Angel (on loan to DC Power FC through December 31, 2026)
19	GK	USA	Mackenzie Wood (on loan to Portland Thorns FC through December 31, 2026)

=== Coaching staff ===
As of March 28, 2026.

Coaching staff
**Interim Head coach**	(Mexico) Karina Báez
**Interim Director of Coaching**	(Jamaica) Lorne Donaldson
**Assistant coach**	(United States) Nicole Lukic

=== Head coaching records ===
As of September 13, 2026.

Name	Nationality	W-L-D	From	To	Ref.
Emma Hayes	England	6–14–6	May 15, 2008	May 24, 2010	
Marcia McDermott (interim)	United States	1–0–0	May 24, 2010	June 3, 2010	
Omid Namazi	United States	5–7–5	June 3, 2010	December 31, 2010	
Rory Dames	United States	106–63–54	2011	November 22, 2021	
Rade Tanasković (acting)	Serbia	N/A; offseason only	November 22, 2021	February 18, 2022	
Chris Petrucelli	United States	16–18–9	February 18, 2022	October 10, 2023	
Ella Masar (acting)	United States	0–1–0	October 10, 2023	December 20, 2023	
Lorne Donaldson	Jamaica	11–20–2	December 20, 2023	April 30, 2025	
Masaki Hemmi (interim)	Japan	0–4–3	April 30, 2025	July 3, 2025	
Ella Masar (interim)	United States	0–0–4	July 3, 2025	August 22, 2025	
Anders Jacobson (interim)	Sweden	2–3–4	August 23, 2025	November 22, 2025	
Martin Sjögren	Sweden	4–13–1	November 22, 2025	August 12, 2026	
Karina Báez (interim)	Mexico	1–4–1	August 12, 2026	present	

=== Top scorers (NWSL) ===
Rank	Player	Goals
1T	(Australia) Samantha Kerr	35
1T	(United States) Christen Press	35
3	(United States) Sofia Huerta	22
4	(United States) Alyssa Mautz	13
5	(United States) Jen Hoy	12

Bold denotes active players.

=== Notable former players ===
Former members of the team who have represented a senior national team are:

- (Australia) Heather Garriock
- (Republic of Ireland) Mary Therese McDonnell
- (Australia) Lydia Williams
- (Australia) Sam Kerr
- (Brazil) Cristiane
- (Canada) Erin McLeod
- (Canada) Carmelina Moscato
- (Canada) Karina LeBlanc
- (England) Karen Carney
- (England) Katie Chapman
- (Germany) Sonja Fuss
- (Germany) Inka Grings
- (Republic of Ireland) Shannon McDonnell
- (Mexico) Maribel Domínguez
- (New Zealand) Abby Erceg
- (Portugal) Amanda Da Costa
- (Scotland) Ifeoma Dieke
- (Spain) Verónica Boquete
- (Sweden) Kosovare Asllani
- (Sweden) Caroline Jönsson
- (Sweden) Frida Östberg
- (United States) Danesha Adams
- (United States) Shannon Boxx
- (United States) Lori Chalupny
- (United States) Marian Dalmy
- (United States) Whitney Engen
- (United States) Julie Ertz
- (United States) Sofia Huerta
- (United States) Carli Lloyd
- (United States) Jillian Loyden
- (United States) Kate Markgraf
- (United States) Kristie Mewis
- (United States) Ella Masar
- (United States) Leslie Osborne
- (United States) Christen Press
- (United States) Megan Rapinoe
- (United States) Lindsay Tarpley

== Honors ==
- NWSL Championship: Runners-up (2019, 2021)
- NWSL Challenge Cup: Runners-up (2020)
- USASA National Women's Open: Winners (2012)

=== Season records ===
Year	League	Team MVP	Golden Boot (Note: Team leader in regular-season goals.)		Defender of the Year	Reference
Year	League	Team MVP	Winner	Goals	Defender of the Year	Reference
2009	WPS	(Brazil) Cristiane	Cristiane	7		
2010	WPS		(United States) Ella Masar	8		
2011	WPSL		(United States) Amanda Cinalli	10		
2012	WPSLE		(United States) Lauren Fowlkes	7		
2013	NWSL	(United States) Lori Chalupny	Lori Chalupny	5	(Germany) Sonja Fuss	
2014	NWSL	Lori Chalupny	(United States) Christen Press	6	(United States) Julie Johnston	
2015	NWSL	Christen Press	Christen Press	10	Julie Johnston	
2016	NWSL	Christen Press	Christen Press	8	Julie Johnston	
2017	NWSL	Julie Ertz	Christen Press	11	(United States) Casey Short	
2018	NWSL	(Australia) Sam Kerr	Sam Kerr	16	(United States) Katie Naughton	
