= 2016 Chicago Red Stars season =

Chicago Red Stars
2016 season
- Owner: Arnim Whisler
- Head coach: Rory Dames
- Stadium: Toyota Park (capacity: 20,000)
- NWSL: 3rd
- Top goalscorer: Christen Press (9 goals)
- Highest home attendance: 4,024 (May 1 vs. Orlando)
- Lowest home attendance: 2,068 (September 7 vs. Kansas City)
- Average home league attendance: 3,060
Home colors	Away colors

The 2016 Chicago Red Stars season was the eighth season of the soccer club and its fourth season in National Women's Soccer League.

After a banner 2015 season, the team expected to do well again. The club ended the regular season at third place, and played the play-off semi-final at Boyds, Maryland against Washington Spirit on September 30, falling 2–1 and did not reach the championship match.

This season the Red Stars returned to Toyota Park for its home games, where it last played on a regular basis during its 2010 season in Women's Professional Soccer league. In 2016 season, the Red Stars honored the retirements of several long time members; Michelle Lomnicki, Julianne Sitch, Jackie Santacaterina, and Lori Chalupny. The jersey number 17 worn by Chalupny, a 3-year captain, an Olympic gold medalist and a FIFA world champion was retired in honor of her accomplishments.

After the season, National team coach Jill Ellis called up 5 Red Stars, Christen Press, Alyssa Naeher, Arin Gilliland, Casey Short and Danielle Colaprico to national team training camp. On October 7, NWSL announced the voting results of NWSL Best XI and NWSL Second XI; while Press and Gilliland were named to Best XI; 5 Red Stars, Naeher, Julie Johnston, Short, Colaprico and Vanessa DiBernardo were named to NWSL Second XI.

In the off-season 8 Red Stars, the highest number in team history, went to play in Australia on loan to W-League sides; Samantha Johnson to Melbourne Victory; Jen Hoy and Arin Gilliland to Newcastle Jets; Alyssa Mautz and Vannesa DiBernardo to Perth Glory; and Katie Naughton, Danielle Colaprico and Sofia Huerta to Adelaide United. Chicago Red Stars loaned the largest number of players to W-League, 4 more than any other NWSL club.

== First-team squad ==
Roster

Players who are under contract to play for the club in 2016 NWSL season.

Note: Flags indicate national team as defined under FIFA eligibility rules; some limited exceptions apply. Players may hold more than one non-FIFA nationality.

No.	Pos.	Nation	Player
1	GK	USA	Alyssa Naeher
2	FW	USA	Jen Hoy
3	DF	USA	Arin Gilliland
4	MF	CAN	Alyssa Mautz
5	DF	USA	Katie Naughton
6	DF	USA	Casey Short
7	MF	USA	Taylor Comeau
8	DF	USA	Julie Johnston
9	FW	USA	Stephanie McCaffrey
10	MF	USA	Vanessa DiBernardo (Note: DiBernado is the captain when Press is on national duty)

No.	Pos.	Nation	Player
11	FW	MEX	Sofia Huerta
12	FW	USA	Cara Walls
13	MF	POR	Amanda DaCosta
14	DF	USA	Sarah Gorden
15	DF	USA	Courtney Raetzman
16	DF	USA	Samantha Johnson
18	GK	USA	Michele Dalton
23	FW	USA	Christen Press (C)
24	MF	USA	Danielle Colaprico
34	MF	USA	Mary Luba

College draft

Players selected by the club in 2016 NWSL College Draft.

Note: Flags indicate national team as defined under FIFA eligibility rules; some limited exceptions apply. Players may hold more than one non-FIFA nationality.

No.	Pos.	Nation	Player
—	DF	USA	Katie Naughton
—	DF	USA	Sarah Gorden
—	MF	USA	Courtney Raetzman
—	FW	USA	Janelle Flaws (Note: Janelle Flaws and Adrienne Jordan was not named to final roster)

No.	Pos.	Nation	Player
—	DF	USA	Adrienne Jordan
—	DF	PAN	Candace Johnson (Note: Candace Johnson and Ashleigh Ellenwood was not named to preseason roster)
—	FW	USA	Ashleigh Ellenwood

Naughton, Gorden and Raetzman joined the Red Stars first team; Flaws, Jordan, C Johnson and Ellenwood joined the Red Stars Reserves team which competes in Women's Premier Soccer League. Janelle Flaws played for 45 minutes in NWSL regular season, in an away match against Washington on July 9.

Amateur call-up

Amateur players listed below were called up during the absence of international players training or playing for the national team at the 2016 Olympics or international friendly

Player	Pos	Home town	College	Ref
Brianna Smallidge	GK	Port Orchard, Washington	Seattle University	
Jannelle Flaws	FW	Glenview, Illinois	University of Illinois	
Kassidy Brown	MF	Lake Zurich, Illinois	University of Illinois	
Rebekah Roller	MF	Brookfield, Wisconsin	DePaul University	

== Player movement ==
Joined in previous seasons During preseason During regular season

N	Pos	Player	Date	Trans	GDR	Method	Club
5	FW	Zakiya Bywaters	Jan 18, 2013	in	––	2013 College Draft	UCLA Bruins
2	FW	Jen Hoy	Jan 18, 2013	in	Apr 16, 2016	2013 College Draft	Princeton Tigers
4	MF	Alyssa Mautz	Feb 7, 2013	in	Apr 16, 2016	2013 Supplemental draft	Chicago Red Stars
––	DF	Michelle Lomnicki	Feb 7, 2013	in	––	2013 Supplemental draft	Sky Blue FC
10	MF	Vanessa DiBernardo	Jan 17, 2014	in	––	2014 College Draft	University of Illinois
––	DF	Taryn Hemmings	Sep 1, 2014	in	––	Signed	Fortuna Hjorring (loaned to)
––	MF	Lori Chalupny	Sep 4, 2014	in	––	Signed	Chicago Red Stars
––	DF	Abby Erceg	Sep 4, 2014	in	––	Signed	FF USV Jena (loaned to)
16	DF	Samantha Johnson	Sep 5, 2014	in	Apr 16, 2016	2014 preseason trial	USC Trojans
––	FW	Adriana Leon	Jan 15, 2015	in	––	2015 Player allocation	Chicago Red Stars
––	FW	Melissa Tancredi	Jan 15, 2015	in	––	2015 Player allocation	Chicago Red Stars
––	MF	Rachel Quon	Jan 15, 2015	in	––	2015 Player allocation	Chicago Red Stars
3	DF	Arin Gilliland	Jan 16, 2015	in	Apr 16, 2016	2015 College draft	University of Kentucky
24	MF	Danielle Colaprico	Jan 16, 2015	in	Apr 16, 2016	2015 College draft	University of Virginia
11	FW	Sofia Huerta	Jan 16, 2015	in	Apr 16, 2016	2015 College draft	Santa Clara University
12	FW	Cara Walls	Jan 16, 2015	in	Apr 16, 2016	2015 College draft	University of Wisconsin–Madison
18	GK	Michele Dalton	Apr 16, 2015	in	Apr 16, 2016	Signed	Kvarnsvedens IK
34	MF	Mary Luba	Sep 2, 2015	in	Apr 16, 2016	Signed	Marquette University
––	MF	Brittany Bock	Oct 22, 2015	in	––	2015 NWSL waiver wire	Houston Dash
14	DF	Taryn Hemmings	Nov 2, 2015	out	––	Expansion draft	Orlando Pride
––	DF	Abby Erceg	Nov 10, 2015	out	––	Trade	Western New York Flash
––	FW	Adriana Leon	Nov 10, 2015	out	––	Trade	Western New York Flash
––	DF	Whitney Engen	Nov 10, 2015	in	––	Trade	Western New York Flash
10	MF	Vanessa DiBernardo	Nov 12, 2015	out	––	Loan	Perth Glory
––	DF	Whitney Engen	Nov 23, 2015	out	––	Trade	Boston Breakers
1	GK	Alyssa Naeher	Nov 23, 2015	in	Apr 16, 2016	Trade	Boston Breakers
6	DF	Casey Short	Nov 24, 2015	in	Apr 16, 2016	Signed	Avaldsnes IL
––	MF	Lori Chalupny	Dec 8, 2015	out	––	Retire	––
8	DF	Julie Johnston	Jan 13, 2016	in	Apr 16, 2016	Player allocation	Chicago Red Stars
23	FW	Christen Press	Jan 13, 2016	in	Apr 16, 2016	Player allocation	Chicago Red Stars
5	DF	Katie Naughton	Jan 17, 2016	in	Apr 16, 2016	College draft	University of Notre Dame
14	DF	Sarah Gorden	Jan 17, 2016	in	Apr 16, 2016	College draft	DePaul University
15	MF	Courtney Raetzman	Jan 17, 2016	in	Apr 16, 2016	College draft	University of Kentucky
––	FW	Janelle Flaws	Jan 17, 2016	in	––	College draft	University of Illinois
––	DF	Adrienne Jordan	Jan 17, 2016	in	––	College draft	University of Northern Colorado
––	DF	Candace Johnson	Jan 17, 2016	in	––	College draft	University of Missouri
––	FW	Ashleigh Ellenwood	Jan 17, 2016	in	––	College draft	University of Arkansas
––	MF	Amanda DaCosta	Jan 25, 2016	in	Apr 16, 2016	Trade	Washington Spirit
––	FW	Melissa Tancredi	Feb 8, 2016	out	––	Player allocation	––
––	DF	Michelle Lomnicki	Mar 1, 2016	out	––	Retire	––
––	MF	Rachel Quon	Mar 14, 2016	out	––	Career on hold	––
10	MF	Vanessa DiBernardo	Mar 14, 2016	in	Apr 14, 2016	Return	Perth Glory
––	DF	Candace Johnson	Mar 14, 2016	out	––	Not on roster	––
––	FW	Ashleigh Ellenwood	Mar 14, 2016	out	––	Not on roster	––
––	FW	Brittany Bock	Mar 15, 2016	out	––	Not on roster	––
5	FW	Zakiya Bywaters	Mar 29, 2016	out	––	Not on roster	––
7	MF	Taylor Comeau	Apr 11, 2016	in	Apr 23, 2016	2016 preseaon trial	Portland Thorns FC
––	DF	Adrienne Jordan	Apr 11, 2016	out	––	Not on roster	––
––	FW	Janelle Flaws	Apr 11, 2016	out	––	Not on roster	––
1	GK	Alyssa Naeher	May 18, 2016	out	Jun 22, 2016	Friendly/Olympics	USWNT
8	DF	Julie Johnston	May 18, 2016	out	Jun 22, 2016	Friendly/Olympics	USWNT
23	FW	Christen Press	May 18, 2016	out	Jun 22, 2016	Friendly/Olympics	USWNT
9	FW	Stephanie McCaffrey	Jul 22, 2016	in	Jul 23, 2016	Trade	Boston Breakers
1	GK	Alyssa Naeher	Aug 12, 2016	in	Aug 27, 2016	Olympics elimination	USWNT
8	DF	Julie Johnston	Aug 12, 2016	in	Aug 27, 2016	Olympics elimination	USWNT
23	FW	Christen Press	Aug 12, 2016	in	Aug 27, 2016	Olympics elimination	USWNT

== Management and staff ==
Front Office

- Owner Arnim Whisler

Coaching Staff

- Manager Rory Dames
- Assistant coach Bonnie Young
- Assistant coach Brian Kibler
- Assistant and Goalkeeper Coach Jordi King

== Regular-season standings ==
Pos	Team	Pld	W	D	L	GF	GA	GD	Pts	Qualification
1	Portland Thorns FC	20	12	5	3	35	19	+16	41	NWSL Shield
2	Washington Spirit	20	12	3	5	30	21	+9	39	NWSL Playoffs
3	Chicago Red Stars	20	9	6	5	24	20	+4	33	NWSL Playoffs
4	Western New York Flash (C)	20	9	5	6	40	26	+14	32	NWSL Playoffs
5	Seattle Reign FC	20	8	6	6	29	21	+8	30	
6	FC Kansas City	20	7	5	8	18	20	−2	26	
7	Sky Blue FC	20	7	5	8	24	30	−6	26	
8	Houston Dash	20	6	4	10	29	29	0	22	
9	Orlando Pride	20	6	1	13	20	30	−10	19	
10	Boston Breakers	20	3	2	15	14	47	−33	11	

Source: NWSL
Rules for classification: Tiebreakers
(C) Champions

Results summary

Overall								Home						Away					
Pld	W	D	L	GF	GA	GD	Pts	W	D	L	GF	GA	GD	W	D	L	GF	GA	GD
20	9	6	5	24	20	+4	33	5	4	1	16	9	+7	4	2	4	8	11	−3

Last updated: September 24, 2016.
Source: NWSLSoccer.com: 2016 Schedules: Chicago Red Stars

Results by Round

Round	1	2	3	4	5	6	7	8	9	10	11	12	13	14	15	16	17	18	19	20
Stadium	A	H	H	A	A	A	H	H	H	A	A	A	A	H	H	A	H	H	A	H
Result	L	W	W	W	D	W	D	D	W	L	L	L	W	D	W	W	D	L	D	W
Position (Note: Chicago Red Stars' position in the league at the end of match day)	10	7	4	2	2	2	1	1	1	2	3	4	4	5	4	3	3	4	3	3

Updated to match(es) played on September 24, 2016. Source: NWSLSoccer.com: 2016 Schedules: Chicago Red Stars
A = Away; H = Home; W = Win; D = Draw; L = Loss

== Match results ==
Win Tie Loss

=== Preseason ===
On February 8 Chicago Red Stars announced its preseason schedule.

March 18, Fri	Chicago Red Stars	undisclosed	Illinois State University	(closed to public)
undisclosed time		Photos		Stadium: undisclosed

April 3, Sun	Northwestern University	0–5	Chicago Red Stars	Evanston, Illinois
17:00 CDT (UTC-05)		Report	Hoy 12', 20'; Huerta 60', 85'; Mautz 87'	Stadium: Lenny and Sharon Martin Stadium

April 6, Wed	Nortre Dame University	2–3	Chicago Red Stars	South Bend, Indiana
18:00 CDT (UTC-05)	Jennifer Westendorf 26' (Kaitlin Klawunder); Kaleigh Olmsted 71'	Report	Mautz 8' (Hoy); Raetzman 48'; Hoy 50' (Raetzman)	Stadium: Alumni Stadium

=== National Women's Soccer League ===
==== Regular season ====
April 16, 7:30 pm CDT 1	Houston Dash	3–1	Chicago Red Stars	Houston, Texas
19:30 UTC-05	Daly 22' (unassisted); Lloyd 51' (Daly); Beckie 53' (Ohai)		Press 13' (unassisted)	Stadium: BBVA Compass Stadium; Attendance: 7,440; Referee: Chris Spivey

April 23, 6:00 pm CDT 2	Chicago Red Stars	1–0	Western New York Flash	Bridgeview, Illinois
18:00 UTC-05	Short 28' (unassisted)			Stadium: Toyota Park; Attendance: 2,529; Referee: Leszek Stalmach

May 1, 5:00 pm CDT 3	Chicago Red Stars	1–0	Orlando Pride	Bridgeview, Illinois
17:00 UTC-05	Press 65' (Colaprico)		Evans (yellow card) 41'	Stadium: Toyota Park; Attendance: 4,024; Referee: Victor Rivas

May 7, 6:00 pm CDT 4	Boston Breakers	0–1	Chicago Red Stars	Boston, Massachusetts
18:00 UTC-05			Hoy (yellow card) 7'; Press 60' (unassisted)	Stadium: Jordan Field; Attendance: 3,622; Referee: Magaret Domka

May 13, 7:30 pm CDT 5	FC Kansas City	0–0	Chicago Red Stars	Kansas City, Missouri
19:30 UTC-05			Johnson (yellow card) 39'	Stadium: Swope Soccer Village; Attendance: 2217; Referee: Chipalo Street

May 22, 6:00 pm CDT 6	Seattle Reign FC	1–2	Chicago Red Stars	Seattle, Washington
18:00 UTC-05	Little 89' (pen.); Corsie (yellow card) 74'		Hoy 56' (unassisted), 67' (DiBernardo)	Stadium: Memorial Stadium; Attendance: 4,056; Referee: Reyna Fonseca

May 29, 6:00 pm CDT 7	Chicago Red Stars	1–1	Sky Blue FC	Bridgeview, Illinois
18:00 UTC-05	Huerta 34' (Hoy)		Galton 69' (Lytle) (yellow card) 57'	Stadium: Toyota Park; Attendance: 2,502; Referee: Matthew Franz

June 12, 5:00 pm CDT 8	Chicago Red Stars	1–1	Portland Thorns FC	Bridgeview, Illinois
17:00 UTC-05	Press 61' (Mautz); Sofia Huerta (yellow card) 74'; Mautz (yellow card) 75'; Gilliland (yellow card) 84'		Sinclair 24'; Nadim (yellow card) 88'	Stadium: Toyota Park; Attendance: 3,131; Referee: Levi Rippy

June 18, 7:00 pm CDT 9	Chicago Red Stars	3–0	Boston Breakers	Bridgeview, Illinois
19:00 UTC-05	Huerta 3' (DiBernardo), 57' (Mautz); Huerta (yellow card) 56'; Short 62' (DiBernardo)		Schillgard (yellow card) 55'; Beckmann (yellow card) 61'; Simon (yellow card) 94+'	Stadium: Toyota Park; Attendance: 2,553; Referee: Danielle Brzezesinski-Chesky

June 22, 9:00 pm CDT 10	Portland Thorns FC	2–0	Chicago Red Stars	Portland, Oregon
21:00 UTC-05	Sinclair 6'; Nadim 25' (Henry)			Stadium: Providence Park; Attendance: 16.931; Referee: Chipalo Street`

July 1, 6:00 pm CDT 11	Western New York Flash	2–0	Chicago Red Stars	Rochester, New York
18:00 UTC-05	Sanderson 37'; Williams 74' (McDonald); Zerboni (yellow card) 78'			Stadium: Sahlen's Stadium; Attendance: 3,114; Referee: Danielle Brzezinski-Chesky

July 9, 6:00 pm CDT 12	Washington Spirit	2–0	Chicago Red Stars	Boyds, Maryland
18:00 UTC-05	Banini 24' (Ordega); Ordega (yellow card) 47'; Stengal 74' (Nairn)		Mautz (yellow card) 42'	Stadium: Maryland SoccerPlex; Attendance: 3,631; Referee: Brandon Artis

July 16, 6:30 pm CDT 13	Orlando Pride	0–1	Chicago Red Stars	Orlando, Florida
18:30 UTC-05	Evans (yellow card) 94+'		Comeau 23' (Huerta); Gilliland (yellow card) 44'	Stadium: Camping World Stadium; Attendance: 7,247; Referee: Victor Rivas
Note: lightning delayed at minute 74 for 1 hour

July 23, 7:00 pm CDT 14	Chicago Red Stars	1–1	Houston Dash	Bridgeview, Illinois
19:00 UTC-05	Roccaro 2' (o.g])		Crosson (yellow card) 64'; Daly 82' (Ohai)	Stadium: Toyota Park; Attendance: 3,621; Referee: Levi Rippy

July 30, 7:00 pm CDT 15	Chicago Red Stars	1–0	FC Kansas City	Bridgeview, Illinois
19:00 UTC-05	McCaffrey 53'			Stadium: Toyota Park; Attendance: 2,550; Referee: Andrew Musashe

August 27, 6:00 pm CDT 16	Sky Blue FC	1–3	Chicago Red Stars	Piscataway, New Jersey
18:00 UTC-05	Kerr 92+' (Galton)		McCaffrey 31' (unassisted); Press 73' (DiBernardo); Huerta 80' (Gilliland); Mautz (yellow card) 92+'	Stadium: Yurcak Field; Attendance: 3,108; Referee: Danielle Brzezinski-Chesky

September 4, 6:00 pm CDT 17	Chicago Red Stars	2–2	Seattle Reign FC	Bridgeview, Illinois
18:00 UTC-05	Huerta 27' (DiBernardo); Press 79' (pen.)		Melis 5' (Yanez); Barnes 9' (unassisted); Fishlock (yellow card) 80'	Stadium: Toyota Park; Attendance: 3,355; Referee: Christina Unkel

September 7, 6:00 pm CDT 18	Chicago Red Stars	2–3	FC Kansas City	Bridgeview, Illinois
18:00 UTC-05	Press 13' (Comeau); Huerta 87' (Gilliland); Johnston (yellow card) 93+'		Groom 7' (O'Reilly); Silva 62' (McCarty); Groom 77' (Kastor)	Stadium: Toyota Park; Attendance: 2,068; Referee: Farhad Dadkho

September 11, 5:00 pm CDT 19	FC Kansas City	0–0	Chicago Red Stars	Kansas City, Missouri
17:00 UTC-05				Stadium: Swope Soccer Village; Attendance: 2,303; Referee: Ekaterina Koroleva

September 24, 7:00 pm CDT 20	Chicago Red Stars	3–1	Washington Spirit	Bridgeview, Illinois
19:00 UTC-05	Press 6' (DiBernardo); Walls 26' (Huerta); Huerta 46' (unassisted)		Dunn 47' (unassisted)	Stadium: Toyota Park; Attendance: 3,712; Referee: Matthew Franz

==== Postseason playoff ====
September 30, 7:00 pm CDT Semifinal	Washington Spirit	2–1 (a.e.t.)	Chicago Red Stars	Boyds, Maryland
19:00 UTC-05	Krieger 36' (Zadorsky); Nairn (yellow card) 57'; Ordega 111' (Nairn)		Press 74' (Short); Johnson (yellow card) 120+2'	Stadium: Maryland SoccerPlex; Attendance: 4,249; Referee: Danielle Chesky

==== NWSL awards ====
Date	Award	Recipient	Reference
May 4, 2016	Goal of the week of week 3	Christen Press	
May 11, 2016	Goal of the week of week 4	Christen Press	
May 17, 2016	Player of the week of week 5	Alyssa Naeher	
June 1, 2016	Player of the Month of May	Alyssa Naeher	
June 21, 2016	Player of the week of week 9	Sofia Huerta	
August 31, 2016	Save of the week of week 16	Alyssa Naeher	
September 7, 2016	Save of the week of week 17	Alyssa Naeher	
September 14, 2016	Goal of the week of week 18	Christen Press	
October 7, 2016	NWSL Best XI of 2016	Arin Gilliland	
October 7, 2016	NWSL Best XI of 2016	Christen Press	
October 7, 2016	NWSL Second XI of 2016	Alyssa Naeher	
October 7, 2016	NWSL Second XI of 2016	Julie Johnston	
October 7, 2016	NWSL Second XI of 2016	Casey Short	
October 7, 2016	NWSL Second XI of 2016	Danielle Colaprico	
October 7, 2016	NWSL Second XI of 2016	Vanessa DiBernardo	

== Squad statistics ==
Source: NWSL

Squad statistics are of regular season matches only

Key to positions: FW - Forward, MF - Midfielder, DF - Defender, GK – Goalkeeper

N	Pos	Player	GP	GS	Min	G	A	PK	Shot	SOG	SOG%	Cro	CK	Off	Foul	FS	YC	RC
24	MF	Danielle Colaprico	20	20	1783	1	2	0	8	4	50%	0	34	0	21	22	0	0
7	MF	Taylor Comeau	16	6	666	1	1	0	4	3	75%	0	0	1	9	4	0	0
13	MF	Amanda Da Costa	13	8	665	0	0	0	7	4	57%	0	0	2	6	7	0	0
18	GK	Michele Dalton	7	7	630	0	0	0	0	0	—	0	0	0	0	0	0	0
10	MF	Vanessa DiBernardo	20	20	1787	0	7	0	32	13	41%	0	63	0	10	18	0	0
20	MF	Jannelle Flaws	1	0	45	0	0	0	0	0	—	0	0	1	0	0	0	0
3	DF	Arin Gilliland	20	20	1719	0	2	0	8	6	75%	4	1	1	8	10	2	0
14	DF	Sarah Gorden	4	0	111	0	0	0	0	0	—	0	0	0	1	1	0	0
2	FW	Jen Hoy	15	9	674	2	0	0	8	4	50%	1	0	7	8	1	1	0
11	FW	Sofia Huerta	20	20	1742	7	2	0	35	16	46%	5	0	11	26	20	2	0
16	DF	Samantha Johnson	19	19	1676	0	0	0	1	0	0%	0	0	0	9	7	2	0
8	DF	Julie Johnston	12	12	1080	0	0	0	1	0	0%	0	0	0	5	4	1	0
34	MF	Mary Luba	1	0	10	0	0	0	0	0	—	0	0	0	0	0	0	0
4	MF	Alyssa Mautz	18	10	1036	0	2	0	13	5	38%	4	1	7	21	11	4	0
9	FW	Stephanie McCaffrey	6	5	352	2	0	0	8	5	63%	1	0	2	2	1	0	0
1	GK	Alyssa Naeher	13	13	1170	0	0	0	0	0	—	0	0	0	0	0	0	0
5	DF	Katie Naughton	16	9	860	0	0	0	0	0	—	0	0	0	5	3	0	0
23	FW/MF	Christen Press	14	14	1260	8	0	1	62	39	63%	0	1	16	13	6	0	0
15	MF	Courtney Raetzman	6	0	52	0	0	0	0	0	—	0	0	0	0	0	0	0
6	DF	Casey Short	20	20	1781	2	0	0	17	8	47%	3	0	3	12	13	0	0
12	FW	Cara Walls	12	8	701	1	0	0	11	7	64%	0	0	9	5	5	0	0
Team Total			20	—	19800	24	16	1	215	114	53%	18	100	60	161	133	12	0

N	Pos	Goal keeper	GP	GS	Min	GA	GA/G	PKA	PKF	Shot	SOG	Sav	Sav%	YC	RC
18	GK	Michele Dalton	7	7	630	7	1.00	0	0	69	25	17	68%	0	0
1	GK	Alyssa Naeher	13	13	1170	13	1.00	1	2	129	57	43	75%	0	0
Team Total			20	—	1800	20	1.00	1	2	198	82	60	73%	0	0

== Chicago Red Stars team awards ==
On October 5 Chicago Red Stars announced the winners of 2016 team awards. For the third time in 3 years Julie Johnston was the recipient of the award for Defensive Most Valuable Player. For second consecutive year, Christen Press was named the Most Valuable Player, and Vanessa DiBernardo the Unsung Hero. New Red Star Alyssa Naeher, with 75% save percentage, was named the Iron Women of Character, while another new Red Star Casey Short was named the Rookie of the Year.

Team Most Valuable Player

Christen Press (received this same award in second consecutive year)

Defensive Most Valuable Player

Julie Johnston (received this same award in third consecutive year)

Rookie of the Year

Casey Short

Unsung Hero

Vanessa DiBernardo (received this same award in second consecutive year)

Iron Woman of Character

Alyssa Naeher

== Images ==
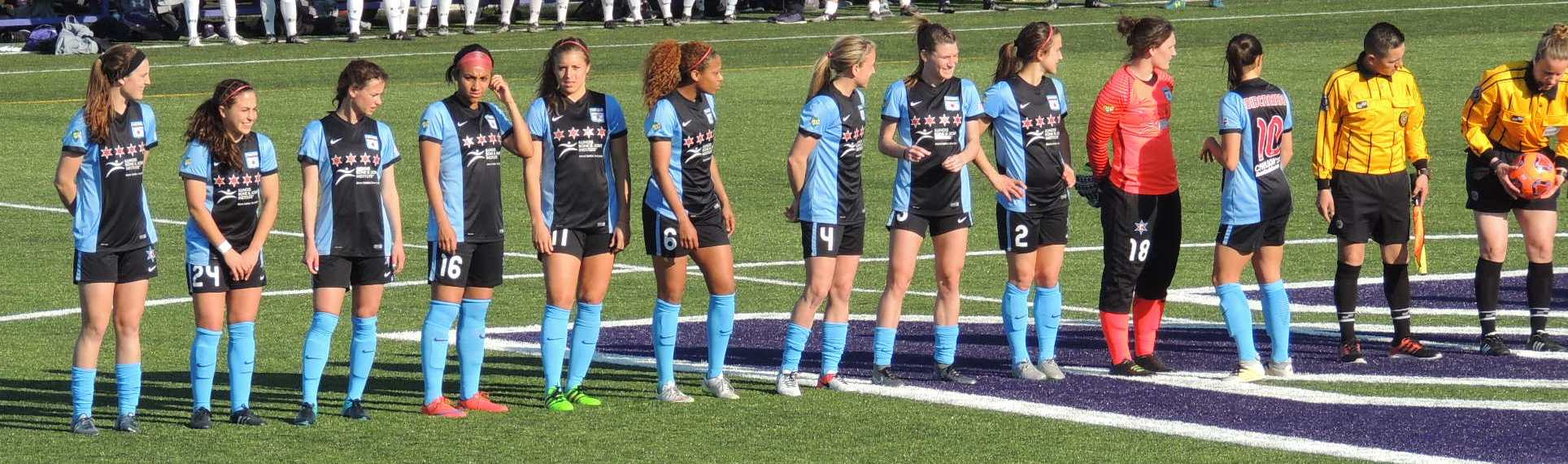
April 3, 2016, Chicago Red Stars preseason starting lineup. Left to right: Katie Naughton, Danielle Colaprico, Taylor Comeau, Samantha Johnson, Sofia Huerta, Casey Short, Alyssa Mautz, Arin Gilliland, Jen Hoy. Michele Dalton and Vanessa DiBernardo (c)

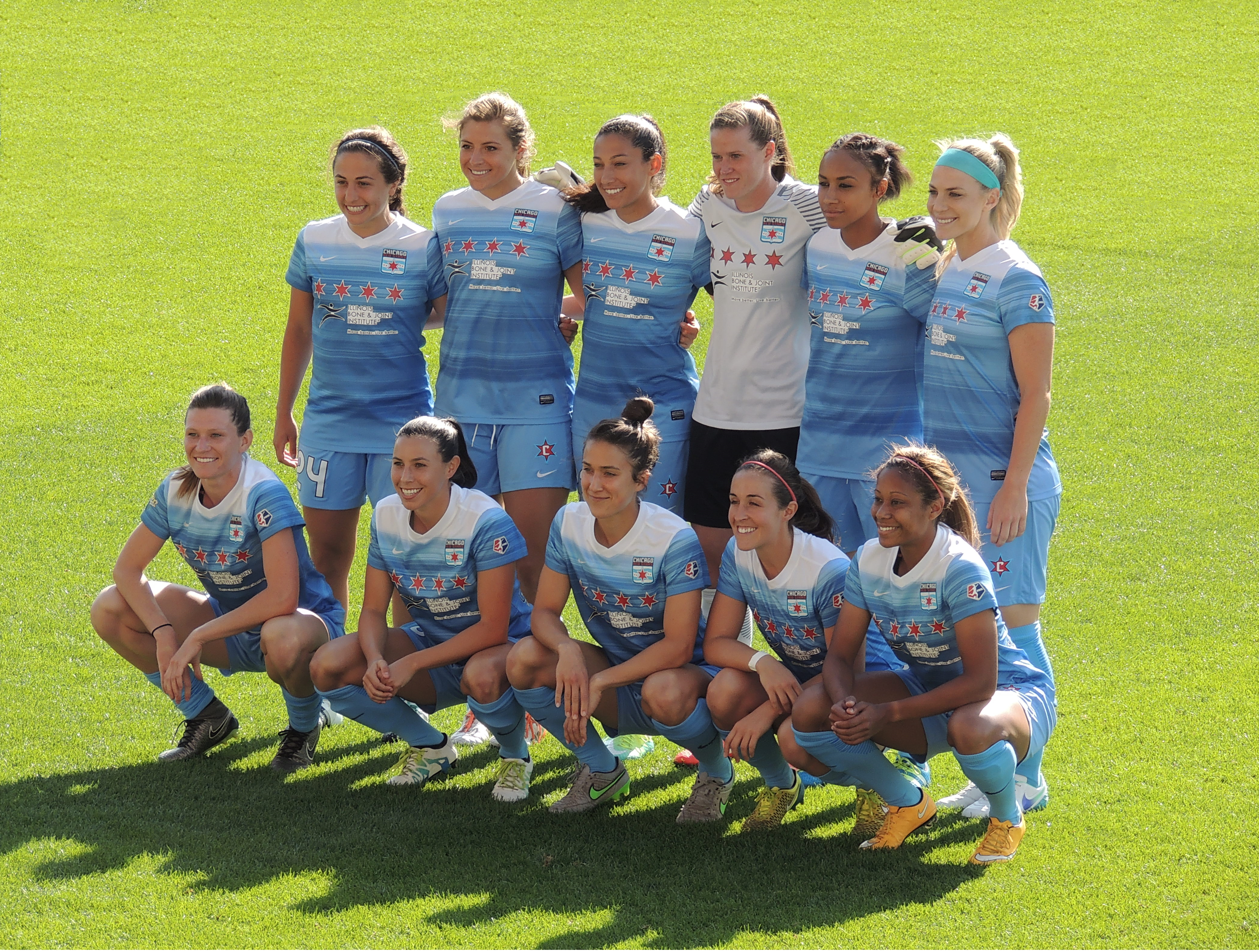
June 12, 2016 - Chicago Red Stars starting lineup against Portland Thorns FC. Left to right, front row: Arin Gilliland, Vanessa DiBernardo, Jen Hoy, Amanda DaCosta, Casey Short; back row: Danielle Colaprico, Sofia Huerta, Christen Press (c), Alyssa Naeher, Samantha Johnson, Julie Johnston
