= 2015 Chicago Red Stars season =

Chicago Red Stars
2015 season
- Owner: Arnim Whisler
- Head coach: Rory Dames
- Stadium: Village of Lisle-Benedictine University Sports Complex (capacity: 3,600); Toyota Park (capacity: 20,000)
- NWSL: 2nd place
- Top goalscorer: Christen Press (10)
- Highest home attendance: 16,017 (May 9 vs. Boston)
- Lowest home attendance: 1,402 (May 2 vs. Sky Blue)
- Average home league attendance: 4,210
Home colors	Away colors	Third colors

The 2015 Chicago Red Stars season was the seventh season of the soccer club and its third season in National Women's Soccer League. For the first time in NWSL the Red Stars advanced to the playoffs by finishing second in regular season. In addition, the team held the first place for ten consecutive weeks, from week 4 to week 13. However, the club could not reach the NWSL championship, as in the playoffs semi-final the Red Stars lost to the reigning Champion FC Kansas City, by a score of 0–3. It was the club's final season playing home games at the Village of Lisle-Benedictine University Sports Complex.

== First-team squad ==
Roster

Players who were under contract to play for the club in 2015 NWSL season.

Note: Flags indicate national team as defined under FIFA eligibility rules; some limited exceptions apply. Players may hold more than one non-FIFA nationality.

No.	Pos.	Nation	Player
1	GK	CAN	Karina LeBlanc
2	FW	USA	Jen Hoy
3	DF	USA	Arin Gilliland
4	MF	CAN	Alyssa Mautz
5	FW	USA	Zakiya Bywaters
6	DF	NZL	Abby Erceg
7	MF	USA	Shannon Boxx
8	DF	USA	Julie Johnston
9	FW	CAN	Melissa Tancredi
10	MF	USA	Vanessa DiBernardo
11	DF	CAN	Rachel Quon

No.	Pos.	Nation	Player
12	FW	USA	Cara Walls
13	DF	USA	Michelle Lomnicki
14	DF	USA	Taryn Hemmings
16	DF	USA	Samantha Johnson
17	MF	USA	Lori Chalupny
18	GK	USA	Michele Dalton
19	FW	CAN	Adriana Leon
20	FW	MEX	Sofia Huerta
23	FW	USA	Christen Press
24	MF	USA	Danielle Colaprico
34	MF	USA	Mary Luba

Reserve players of first-team

Reserve players who appeared in the club's game day rosters during regular season. They should not be confused with the Chicago Red Stars Reserves team which compete in Women's Premier Soccer League.

Note: Flags indicate national team as defined under FIFA eligibility rules; some limited exceptions apply. Players may hold more than one non-FIFA nationality.

No.	Pos.	Nation	Player
25	DF	USA	Kelley McCloskey
26	MF	USA	Jackie Esterkamp
28	FW	USA	Rachel Tejada
29	DF	USA	Lillie Toaspern

No.	Pos.	Nation	Player
30	GK	USA	Monica Gonyo
31	DF	USA	Leigh Jakes
32	DF	USA	Natalie Horner

Squad correct as of August 16, 2015

== Player movement ==
Joined in previous seasons During preseason During regular season

N	Pos	Player	Date	Trans	GDR	Method	Club
5	FW	Zakiya Bywaters	Jan 18, 2013	in	––	2013 College Draft	UCLA Bruins
2	FW	Jen Hoy	Jan 18, 2013	in	Apr 18, 2015	2013 College Draft	Princeton Tigers
4	MF	Alyssa Mautz	Feb 7, 2013	in	May 2, 2015	2013 Supplemental draft	Chicago Red Stars
13	DF	Michelle Lomnicki	Feb 7, 2013	in	Apr 18, 2015	2013 Supplemental draft	Sky Blue FC
10	MF	Vanessa DiBernardo	Jan 17, 2014	in	Apr 18, 2015	2014 College Draft	Illinois Fighting Illini
––	FW	Hayley Brock	Jan 17, 2014	in	––	2014 College Draft	Maryland Terrapins
14	DF	Taryn Hemmings	Sep 1, 2014	in	Apr 18, 2015	Signed	Fortuna Hjorring (loaned to)
17	MF	Lori Chalupny	Sep 4, 2014	in	Apr 18, 2015	Signed	Chicago Red Stars
6	DF	Abby Erceg	Sep 4, 2014	in	Apr 18, 2015	Signed	FF USV Jena (loaned to)
16	DF	Samantha Johnson	Sep 5, 2014	in	Apr 18, 2015	Returned	Sydney FC (loaned to)
7	MF	Shannon Boxx	Jan 14, 2015	in	Apr 18, 2015	Player allocation	Chicago Red Stars
8	DF	Julie Johnston	Jan 15, 2015	in	Apr 18, 2015	Player allocation	Chicago Red Stars
23	FW	Christen Press	Jan 15, 2015	in	Apr 18, 2015	Player allocation	Chicago Red Stars
19	FW	Adriana Leon	Jan 15, 2015	in	––	Player allocation	Chicago Red Stars
1	GK	Karina LeBlanc	Jan 15, 2015	in	Apr 18, 2015	Player allocation	Chicago Red Stars
9	FW	Melissa Tancredi	Jan 15, 2015	in	––	Player allocation	Chicago Red Stars
11	FW	Rachel Quon	Jan 15, 2015	in	Apr 18, 2015	Player allocation	Chicago Red Stars
––	FW	Stephanie McCaffrey	Jan 16, 2015	in	––	2015 College draft	Boston College
3	DF	Arin Gilliland	Jan 16, 2015	in	Apr 18, 2015	2015 College draft	University of Kentucky
24	MF	Danielle Colaprico	Jan 16, 2015	in	Apr 18, 2015	2015 College draft	University of Virginia
20	FW	Sofia Huerta	Jan 16, 2015	in	Apr 18, 2015	2015 College draft	Santa Clara University
12	FW	Cara Walls	Jan 16, 2015	in	Apr 18, 2015	2015 College draft	University of Wisconsin–Madison
––	FW	Nicole Setterlund	Jan 16, 2015	in	––	2015 College draft	Washington State University
28	FW	Rachel Tejada	Jan 16, 2015	in	May 9, 2015	2015 College draft	Illinois State University
––	FW	Stephanie McCaffrey	Mar 4, 2015	out	––	Traded	Boston Breakers
––	FW	Nicole Setterlund	Mar 6, 2015	out	––	Retired	––
5	FW	Zakiya Bywaters	Apr 6, 2015	out	––	Recovering from surgery	––
––	FW	Hayley Brock	Apr 6, 2015	out	––	Returned to school	––
18	GK	Michele Dalton	Apr 16, 2015	in	Apr 18, 2015	Signed	Kvarnsvedens IK
17	MF	Lori Chalupny	Apr 14, 2015	out	May 2, 2015	World Cup	United States
7	MF	Shannon Boxx	Apr 14, 2015	out	May 2, 2015	World Cup	United States
8	DF	Julie Johnston	Apr 14, 2015	out	May 2, 2015	World Cup	United States
23	FW	Christen Press	Apr 14, 2015	out	May 2, 2015	World Cup	United States
19	FW	Adriana Leon	Apr 28, 2015	out	––	World Cup	Canada
1	GK	Karina LeBlanc	Apr 28, 2015	out	May 2, 2015	World Cup	Canada
9	FW	Melissa Tancredi	Apr 28, 2015	out	––	World Cup	Canada
25	DF	Kelley McCloskey	––	in	May 9, 2015	Preseason trial	University of San Diego
26	MF	Jackie Esterkamp	––	in	May 9, 2015	Preseason trial	Cincinnati Christian University
29	DF	Lillie Toaspern	––	in	May 9, 2015	Preseason trial	Washington University in St. Louis
20	GK	Monica Gonyo	––	in	May 9, 2015	Preseason trial	Loyola University Chicago
6	DF	Abby Erceg	May 15, 2015	out	May 15, 2015	World Cup	New Zealand
34	MF	Mary Luba	Sep 2, 2015	in	May 23, 2015	Signed	Marquette University
31	DF	Leigh Jakes	––	in	May 23, 2015	Preseason trial	NiceFutis
32	DF	Natalie Horner	––	in	Jun 28, 2015	Preseason trial	University of Kentucky
6	DF	Abby Erceg	Jun 19, 2015	in	Jun 28, 2015	World Cup elimination	New Zealand
19	FW	Adriana Leon	Jun 27, 2015	in	Jul 12, 2015	World Cup elimination	Canada
1	GK	Karina LeBlanc	Jun 27, 2015	in	Jul 12, 2015	World Cup elimination	Canada
9	FW	Melissa Tancredi	Jun 27, 2015	in	Jul 12, 2015	World Cup elimination	Canada
17	MF	Lori Chalupny	Jul 5, 2015	in	Jul 18, 2015	World Cup final	United States
7	MF	Shannon Boxx	Jul 5, 2015	in	Jul 18, 2015	World Cup final	United States
8	DF	Julie Johnston	Jul 5, 2015	in	Jul 12, 2015	World Cup final	United States
23	FW	Christen Press	Jul 5, 2015	in	Jul 12, 2015	World Cup final	United States
7	MF	Shannon Boxx	Jul 27, 2015	out	Jul 18, 2015	Retired	––

== Management and staff ==
Front Office

- Owner Arnim Whisler

Coaching Staff

- Manager Rory Dames
- First Assistant and Goalkeeper Coach Trae Manny
- Second Assistant Coach Christian Lavers

== Regular-season standings ==
Pos	Team	Pld	W	D	L	GF	GA	GD	Pts	Qualification
1	Seattle Reign FC	20	13	4	3	41	21	+20	43	NWSL Shield
2	Chicago Red Stars	20	8	9	3	31	22	+9	33	NWSL Playoffs
3	FC Kansas City (C)	20	9	5	6	32	20	+12	32	NWSL Playoffs
4	Washington Spirit	20	8	6	6	31	28	+3	30	NWSL Playoffs
5	Houston Dash	20	6	6	8	21	26	−5	24	
6	Portland Thorns FC	20	6	5	9	27	29	−2	23	
7	Western New York Flash	20	6	5	9	24	34	−10	23	
8	Sky Blue FC	20	5	7	8	22	28	−6	22	
9	Boston Breakers	20	4	3	13	22	43	−21	15	

Source: NWSL
Rules for classification: Tiebreakers
(C) Champions

Results summary

Overall								Home						Away					
Pld	Pts	W	L	T	GF	GA	GD	W	L	T	GF	GA	GD	W	L	T	GF	GA	GD
20	33	8	3	9	31	22	+9	3	1	6	15	11	+4	5	2	3	16	11	+5

Last updated: September 6, 2015
Source: NWSLsoccer.com standings
Pld = Matches played; Pts = Points; W = Matches won; T = Matches tied; L = Matches lost; GF = Goals for; GA = Goals against; GD = Goal difference

Results by round

Round	1	2	3	4	5	6	7	8	9	10	11	12	13	14	15	16	17	18	19	20
Ground	H	H	H	H	A	A	A	A	A	A	H	A	A	H	A	H	H	H	A	H
Result	W	D	W	W	D	W	D	L	W	W	D	W	D	D	L	D	L	D	W	D
Position (Note: Chicago Red Stars' position in the league at the end of match day)	5	3	2	1	1	1	1	1	1	1	1	1	1	2	2	2	3	2	2	2

Updated to match(es) played on September 6, 2015. Source: Match results
A = Away; H = Home; W = Win; D = Draw; L = Loss

== Match results ==
Win Tie Loss

=== Preseason ===
March 16, Mon	Marquette Golden Eagles	0–3	Chicago Red Stars	Milwaukee, Wisconsin
17:00 CDT (UTC-05)		Report	Chalupny 12'; Mautz 17'; DiBernardo 53'	Stadium: Valley Fields

March 20, Fri	Wisconsin Badgers	0–1	Chicago Red Stars	Verona, Wisconsin
19:00 CDT (UTC-05)		Report	Colaprico 2'	Stadium: Goodman Pitch at Reddan Park

April 4, Sat	Missouri Lady Tigers	0–6	Chicago Red Stars	St. Louis, Missouri
11:00 CDT (UTC-05)		Report	Walls 1'; DiBernardo 4'; Hoy 5'; Mary Luba 13'; 19' (o.g.); Giuleana Lopez 30'; Jayden Barrett (yellow card) 36'	Stadium: Lou Fusz Soccer Complex Field #1
Note: 45 minute scrimmage.

April 4, Sat	Iowa State Cyclones	0–3	Chicago Red Stars	St. Louis, Missouri
12:00 CDT (UTC-05)		Report	Hoy 23'; Valerie Gonyo 25'; Walls 28'	Stadium: Lou Fusz Soccer Complex Field #1
Note: 45 minute scrimmage.

April 8, Wed	Notre Dame Fighting Irish	0–1	Chicago Red Stars	Notre Dame, Indiana
18:00 CDT (UTC-05)		Report	Huerta 1'; Johnson (yellow card) 41'	Stadium: Alumni Stadium

=== National Women's Soccer League ===
==== Regular season ====
April 18, Sat 1	Chicago Red Stars	3–2	Seattle Reign FC	Lisle, Illinois
19:00 CDT (UTC-05)	Press 32' (DiBernado); 91+' (unassisted); Hoy 35' (Press)	Report	Yanez 32' (Rapinoe); Fletcher 39' (unassisted)	Stadium: Village of Lisle-Benedictine University Sports Complex; Attendance: 2,368; Referee: David Mon

April 25, Sat 2	Chicago Red Stars	2–2	Portland Thorns FC	Lisle, Illinois
19:30 CDT (UTC-05)	Press 4' (Chalupny); 8' (DiBernardo); Johnston (yellow card) 16'	Report	Sinclair 29' (Long); Shim 47' (unassisted)	Stadium: Village of Lisle-Benedictine University Sports Complex; Attendance: 2,136; Referee: Levi Rippy

May 2, Sat 3	Chicago Red Stars	1–0	Sky Blue FC	Lisle, Illinois
17:00 CDT (UTC-05)	Colaprico 54' (unassisted)	Report	Nadim (yellow card) 86'	Stadium: Village of Lisle-Benedictine University Sports Complex; Attendance: 1,402

May 9, Sat 4	Chicago Red Stars	3–0	Boston Breakers	Bridgeview, Illinois
16:00 CDT (UTC-05)	Johnson (yellow card) 22'; Huerta 56' (DiBernardo); 82' (Gilliland); Walls 70' (Huerta)	Report	King (yellow card) 39'	Stadium: Toyota Park; Attendance: 16,017; Referee: Margaret Domka

May 15, Fri 5	Houston Dash	2–2	Chicago Red Stars	Houston
19:30 CDT (UTC-05)	Axon 28' (penalty); Ohai 59' (Henderson); Masar (yellow card) 62'	Report	Colaprico (yellow card) 43'; Huerta 60' (Hoy) 81' (unassisted)	Stadium: BBVA Compass Stadium; Attendance: 3,527; Referee: Randall Kelley

May 23, Sat 6	FC Kansas City	1–2	Chicago Red Stars	Kansas City, Missouri
19:00 CDT (UTC-05)	LePeilbet 68'	Report	Huerta 33' (DiBernardo); Hemmings 82' (Lomnicki)	Stadium: Swope Soccer Village Championship Field

May 30, Sat 7	Seattle Reign FC	0–0	Chicago Red Stars	Seattle
21:00 CDT (UTC-05)	Mathias (yellow card) 90+'	Report	Colaprico (yellow card) 61'	Stadium: Memorial Stadium; Attendance: 2,367; Referee: Brandon Artis

June 6, Sat 8	Western New York Flash	3–1	Chicago Red Stars	Rochester, New York
18:00 CDT (UTC-05)	S Mewis 51' (Eddy); Eddy 72' (Williams); Fields 75' (unassisted); S Mewis (yellow card) 85'	Report	Lomnicki (yellow card) 57'; Huerta 93+' (DiBernardo)	Stadium: Sahlen's Stadium; Attendance: 2,514

June 20, Sat	Chicago Red Stars	abandoned	Washington Spirit	Lisle, Illinois
19:00 CDT (UTC-05)		Report		Stadium: Village of Lisle-Benedictine University Sports Complex
Note: rescheduled to August 16, 2015

June 28, Sun 9	Sky Blue FC	0–3	Chicago Red Stars	Piscataway, New Jersey
17:00 CDT (UTC-05)		Report	DiBernardo 6' (Huerta); Hoy 34' (Huerta); Mautz 62' (Hoy)	Stadium: Yurcak Field

July 12, Sun 10	Houston Dash	1–2	Chicago Red Stars	Houston
19:30 CDT (UTC-05)	McCarty 57' (Ohai); Brush (yellow card) 84'	Report	Colaprico (yellow card) 3'; DiBernado 19' (Mautz); Hoy 69' (unassisted)	Stadium: BBVA Compass Stadium; Attendance: 13,025; Referee: Christopher Spivey

July 18, Sat 11	Chicago Red Stars	1–1	Boston Breakers	Lisle, Illinois
19:00 CDT (UTC-05)	Chalupny 54' (Hemmings); Leon (yellow card) 75'	Report	McCaffrey 62' (unassisted); Schoepfer (yellow card) 63'	Stadium: Village of Lisle-Benedictine University Sports Complex; Attendance: 3,560 record crowd

July 22, Wed 12	Boston Breakers	1–2	Chicago Red Stars	Boston
18:00 CDT (UTC-05)	Simon 69' (McCaffrey)	Report	Tancredi 41' (Mautz); Press 90' (Hoy)	Stadium: Soldiers Field Soccer Stadium; Attendance: 3,403; Referee: Cedric Adams

July 25, Sat 13	Washington Spirit	1–1	Chicago Red Stars	Germantown, Maryland
18:00 CDT (UTC-05)	Dunn 83' (unassisted)	Report	Press 31' (unassisted); Hemmings (yellow card) 74'	Stadium: Maureen Hendricks Field Maryland SoccerPlex; Attendance: 5,100

August 1, Sat 14	Chicago Red Stars	2–2	FC Kansas City	Lisle, Illinois
19:00 CDT (UTC-05)	Press 12' (Chalupny); 74' (Chalupny); Erceg (yellow card) 42'	Report	LePeilbet 35' (Holiday); Hagen 87' (O'Reilly)	Stadium: Village of Lisle-Benedictine University Sports Complex; Attendance: 3,477; Referee: Matthew Franz

August 9, Sun 15	Portland Thorns FC	2–1	Chicago Red Stars	Portland, Oregon
21:00 CDT (UTC-05)	Long 38' (unassisted); 69' (Farrelly)	Report	Mautz 29' (unassisted)	Stadium: Providence Park; Attendance: 15,858; Referee: Margaret Domka

August 12, Wed 16	Chicago Red Stars	1–1	Sky Blue FC	Lisle, Illinois
13:00 CDT (UTC-05)	Leon 15' (Gilliland); Chalupny (yellow card) 64'	Report	Kerr 36' (unassisted); Filigno (yellow card) 86'	Stadium: Village of Lisle-Benedictine University Sports Complex

August 16, Sun 17	Chicago Red Stars	1–2	Washington Spirit	Lisle, Illinois
19:30 CDT (UTC-05)	Tancredi 82' (Mautz); Lomnicki (yellow card) 44'	Report	Oyster 3' (Nairn); Dunn 90+2' (unassisted)	Stadium: Village of Lisle-Benedictine University Sports Complex
Note: rescheduled from June 20, 2015

August 23, Sun 18	Chicago Red Stars	0–0	Western New York Flash	Lisle, Illinois
16:00 CDT (UTC-05)				Stadium: Village of Lisle-Benedictine University Sports Complex

August 29, Sat 19	Western New York Flash	0–2	Chicago Red Stars	Rochester, New York
18:00 CDT (UTC-05)		Report	Press 40' (Chalupny); DiBernardo (yellow card) 63'; Hoy 65' (Press); Erceg (yellow card) 86'	Stadium: Sahlen's Stadium; Attendance: 3,525

September 6, Sun 20	Chicago Red Stars	1–1	Houston Dash	Bridgeview, Illinois
16:00 CDT (UTC-05)	DiBernardo (yellow card) 82'; Press 90' (Johnston)	Report	Masar 62' (Brian)	Stadium: Toyota Park; Attendance: 5,623; Referee: Margaret Domka

==== Postseason playoff ====
September 13, Sun Semifinal	Chicago Red Stars	0–3	FC Kansas City	Bridgeview, Illinois
12:30 CDT (UTC-05)	Samantha Johnson (yellow card) 68'	Report	Rodriguez 16' (unassisted); Tymrak 21' (O'Reilly); Rodriguez 35' (O'Reilly)	Stadium: Toyota Park; Attendance: 3,031; Referee: Karen Abt

==== NWSL awards ====
Date	Award	Recipient	Reference
April 21, 2015	Player of the week of week 2	Christen Press	
May 1, 2015	Player of the month of April	Christen Press	
May 12, 2015	Player of the week of week 5	Sofia Huerta	(Note: Sofia Huerta is the first NWSL to earn back to back player of the week awards)
May 19, 2015	Player of the week of week 6	Sofia Huerta	
June 3, 2015	Player of the month of May	Sofia Huerta	
September 10, 2015	Player of the week of week 21	Karina LeBlanc	
September 14, 2015	Rookie of the year 2015	Danielle Colaprico	(Note: Danielle Colaprico is the second Red Star named NWSL Rookie of the Year, in two consecutive years. Julie Johnston was NWSL Rookie of the Year in 2014)
September 25, 2015	NWSL Best Eleven	Christen Press	
September 25, 2015	NWSL Best Eleven	Julie Johnston	
September 25, 2015	NWSL Second Eleven	Arin Gilliland	
September 25, 2015	NWSL Second Eleven	Danielle Colaprico	
September 25, 2015	NWSL Second Eleven	Sofia Huerta	

== Squad statistics ==
Source: NWSL

Key to positions: FW – Forward, MF – Midfielder, DF – Defender, GK – Goalkeeper

N	Pos	Player	GP	GS	Min	G	A	WG	Shot	SOG	Cro	CK	Off	Foul	FS	YC	RC
7	MF	Shannon Boxx	4	2	231	0	0	0	2	1	0	0	0	3	2	0	0
17	MF	Lori Chalupny	11	11	944	1	3	0	17	9	0	0	1	14	16	1	0
24	MF	Danielle Colaprico	20	20	1776	1	0	1	10	5	2	46	1	18	15	3	0
10	MF	Vanessa DiBernardo	20	19	1733	2	5	1	34	19	5	73	0	25	22	2	0
6	DF	Abby Erceg	14	12	1085	0	0	0	5	3	1	0	0	6	0	2	0
3	DF	Arin Gilliland	19	17	1533	0	2	0	13	5	2	0	4	10	4	0	0
14	DF	Taryn Hemmings	18	17	1528	1	1	1	10	7	4	0	1	18	8	1	0
2	FW	Jen Hoy	18	14	1110	4	4	1	25	15	3	0	12	15	3	0	0
20	FW	Sofia Huerta	19	15	1343	6	3	1	36	20	3	0	17	11	12	0	0
31	DF	Leigh Jakes	1	0	7	0	0	0	0	0	0	0	0	0	0	0	0
16	DF	Samantha Johnson	14	13	1215	0	0	0	0	0	0	0	0	15	4	3	0
8	DF	Julie Johnston	11	11	990	0	2	0	4	1	1	0	0	7	10	1	0
19	FW	Adriana Leon	5	4	277	1	0	0	5	4	0	0	2	5	2	1	0
13	DF	Michelle Lomnicki	12	7	614	0	1	0	4	0	2	0	0	6	4	2	0
34	DF	Mary Luba	3	0	40	0	0	0	1	1	0	0	0	0	1	0	0
4	MF	Alyssa Mautz	15	13	1076	2	3	0	16	4	1	1	3	16	8	0	0
25	DF	Kelley McCloskey	1	0	3	0	0	0	0	0	0	0	0	1	0	0	0
23	FW	Christen Press	11	10	931	10	2	3	50	27	0	0	17	7	2	0	0
11	DF	Rachel Quon	17	12	1046	0	0	0	8	1	0	0	0	10	8	1	0
9	FW	Melissa Tancredi	8	2	246	2	0	0	12	5	0	0	2	5	1	0	0
28	FW	Rachel Tejada	2	0	16	0	0	0	0	0	0	0	0	1	1	0	0
12	FW	Cara Walls	10	1	256	1	1	0	3	3	2	0	4	4	2	0	0

N	Pos	Goal keeper	GP	GS	Min	W	L	T	Shot	SOG	Sav	GA	GA/G	Pen	PKF	SO
18	GK	Michele Dalton	12	12	1080	6	1	5	113	58	47	11	.917	1	1	5
1	GK	Karina LeBlanc	8	8	720	2	2	4	79	39	28	11	1.375	0	0	1

=== Chicago Red Stars team awards ===
On September 23 Chicago Red Stars announced the winners of 2015 team awards. For the second time in 2 years Julie Johnston was the recipient of the award for Defensive Most Valuable Player, having been named Defender of the Year in 2014. Lori Chalupny who was the Team Most Valuable Player in 2014, was named the Iron Women of Character. Christen Press was named Team Most Valuable player, and was in 2014 the Golden Boot recipient. Danielle Colaprico was named the team's Rookie of the Year, while she was also the recipient of the NWSL Rookie of the Year. Vanessa DiBernardo who had a team high of 5 assists, and served a team high of 73 corner kicks, was named the Unsung Hero.

Team Most Valuable Player

Christen Press

Defensive Most Valuable Player

Julie Johnston

Rookie of the Year

Danielle Colaprico

Unsung Hero

Vanessa DiBernardo

Iron Woman of Character

Lori Chalupny

== Images ==
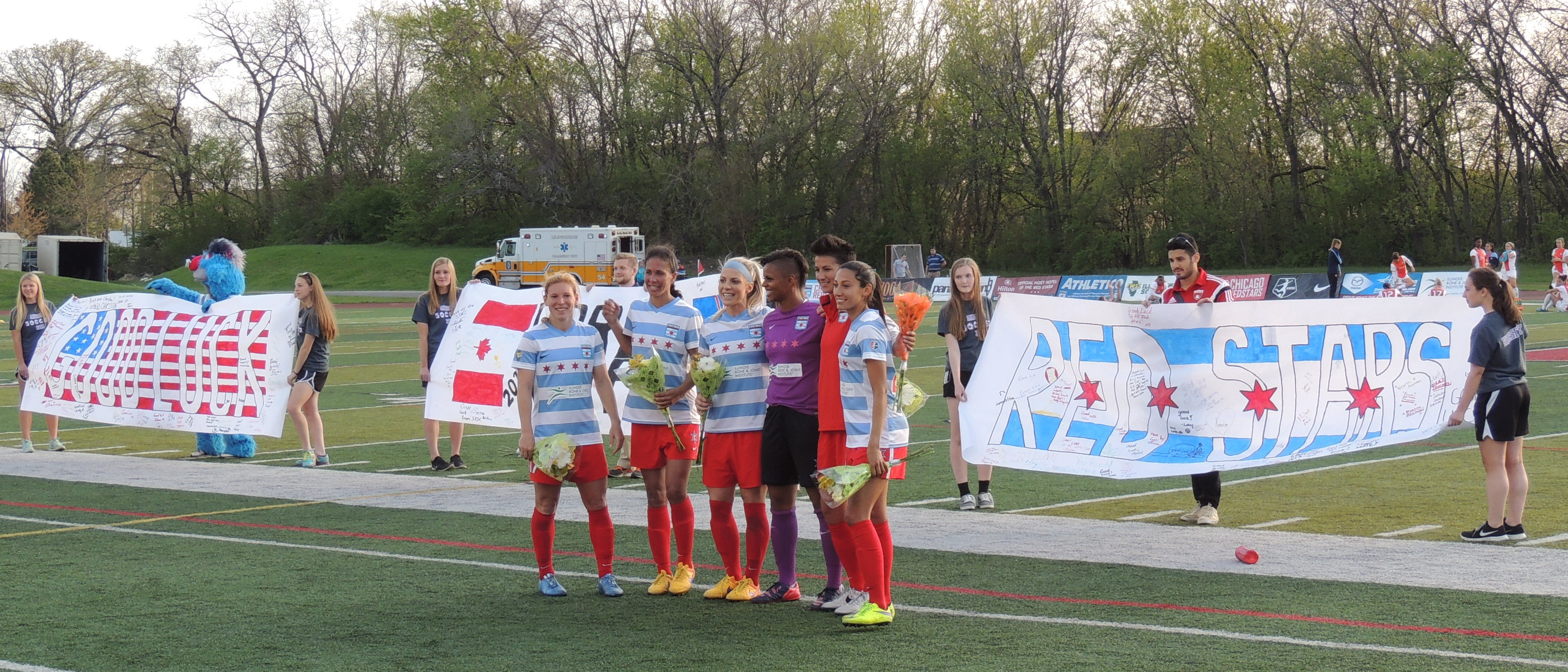
On May 2, 2015, Chicago Red Stars sent off 6 players to their World Cup in a ceremony, after a 1–0 win over Sky Blue FC. Left to right: Lori Chalupny, Shannon Boxx, Julie Johnston, Karina LeBlanc, Abby Erceg and Christen Press. Not in picture and already joined Canada World Cup team were Melissa Tancredi and Adriana Leon. Chicago Red Stars sent eight players to 2015 World Cup; the highest number in NWSL.

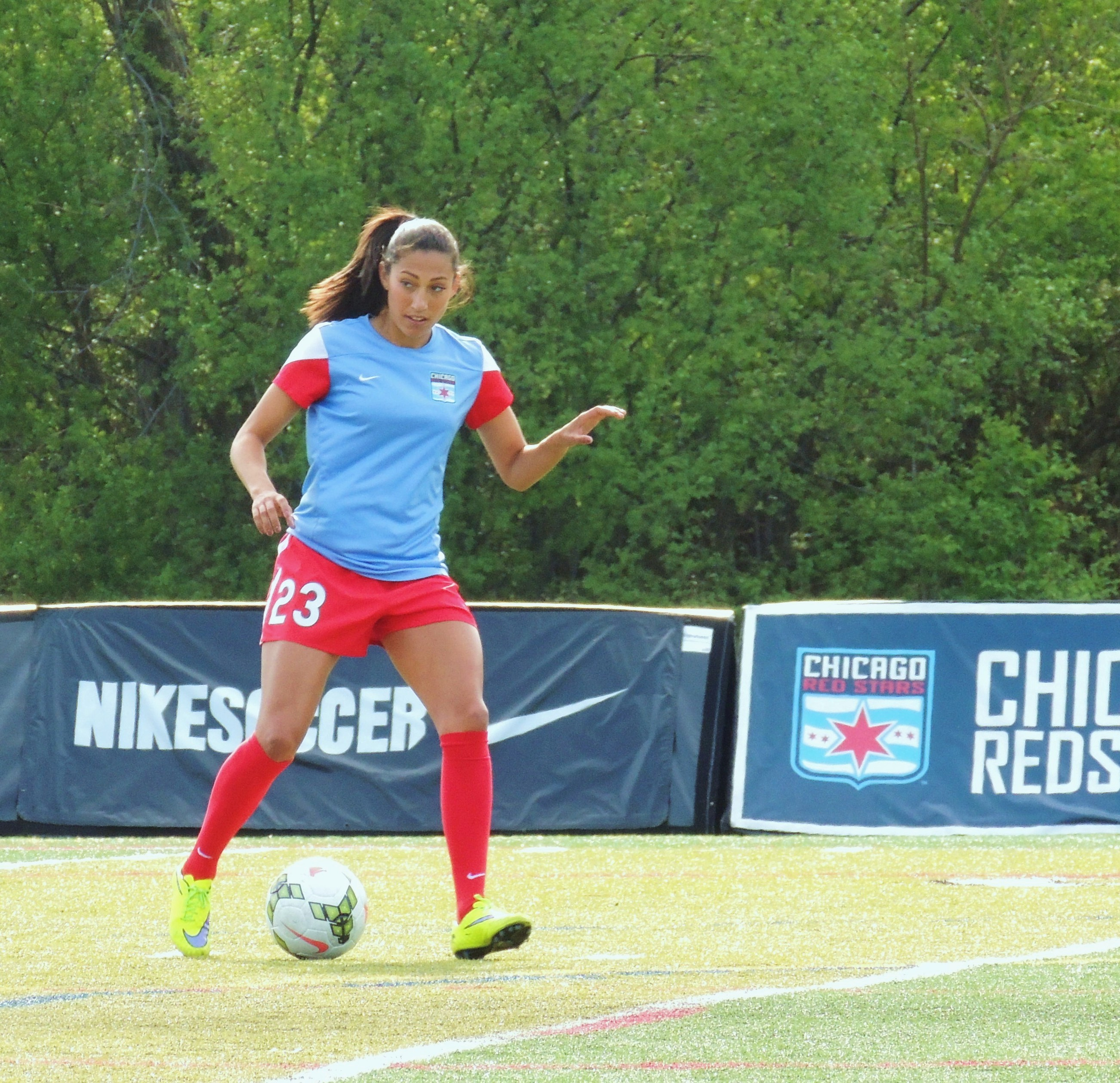
Team MVP Christen Press

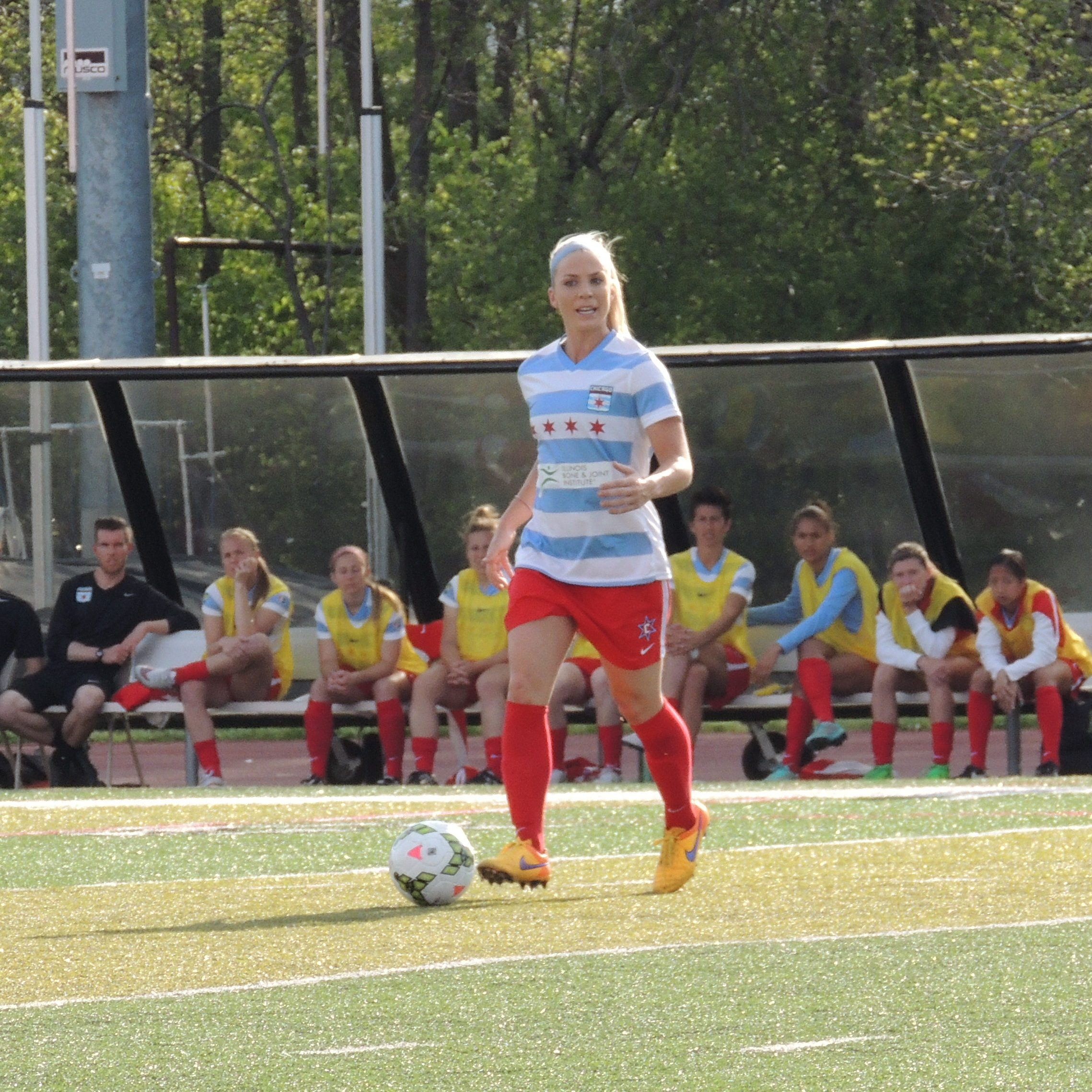
Team Defensive MVP Julie Johnston

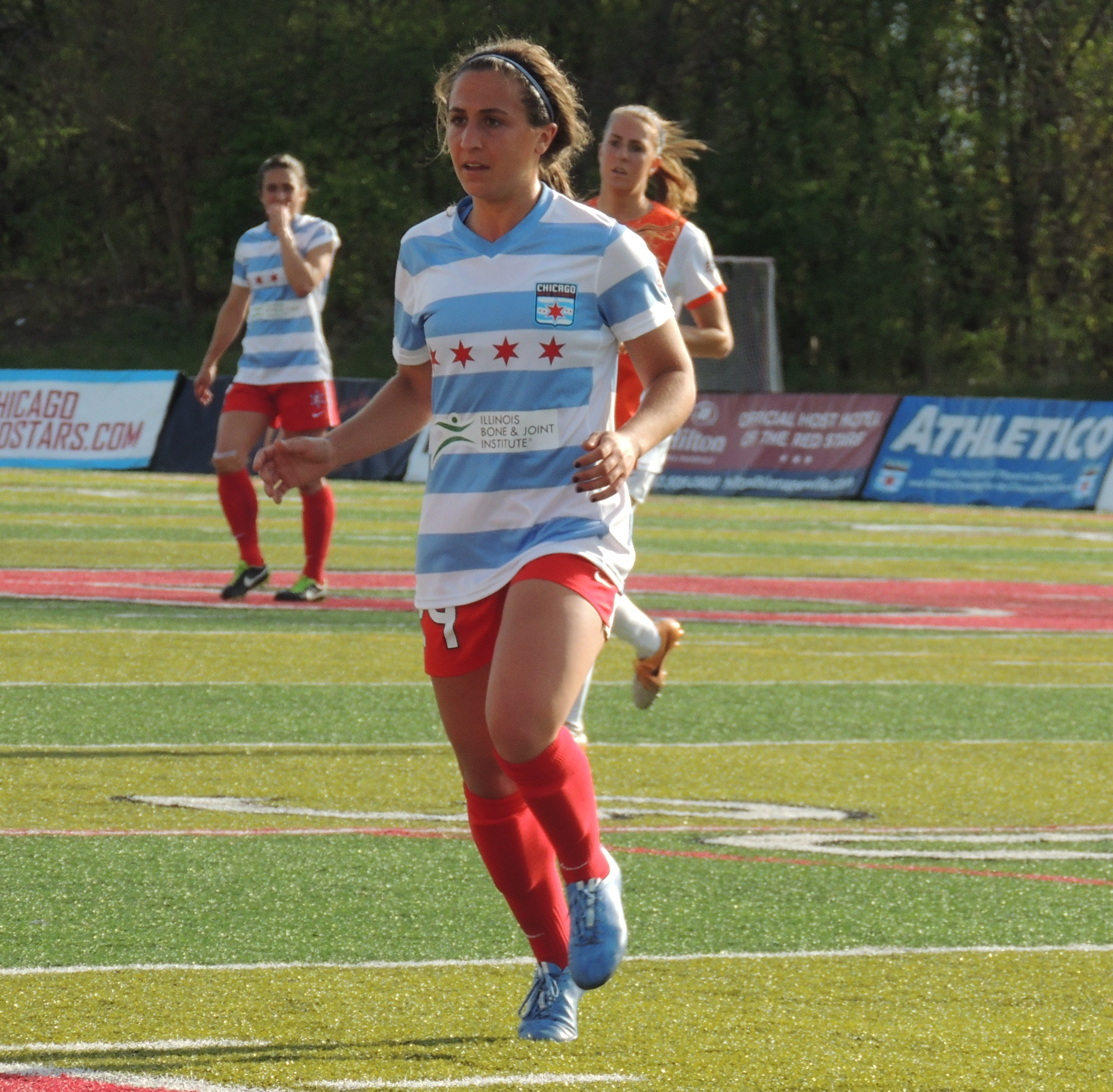
Rookie of the Year Danielle Colaprico

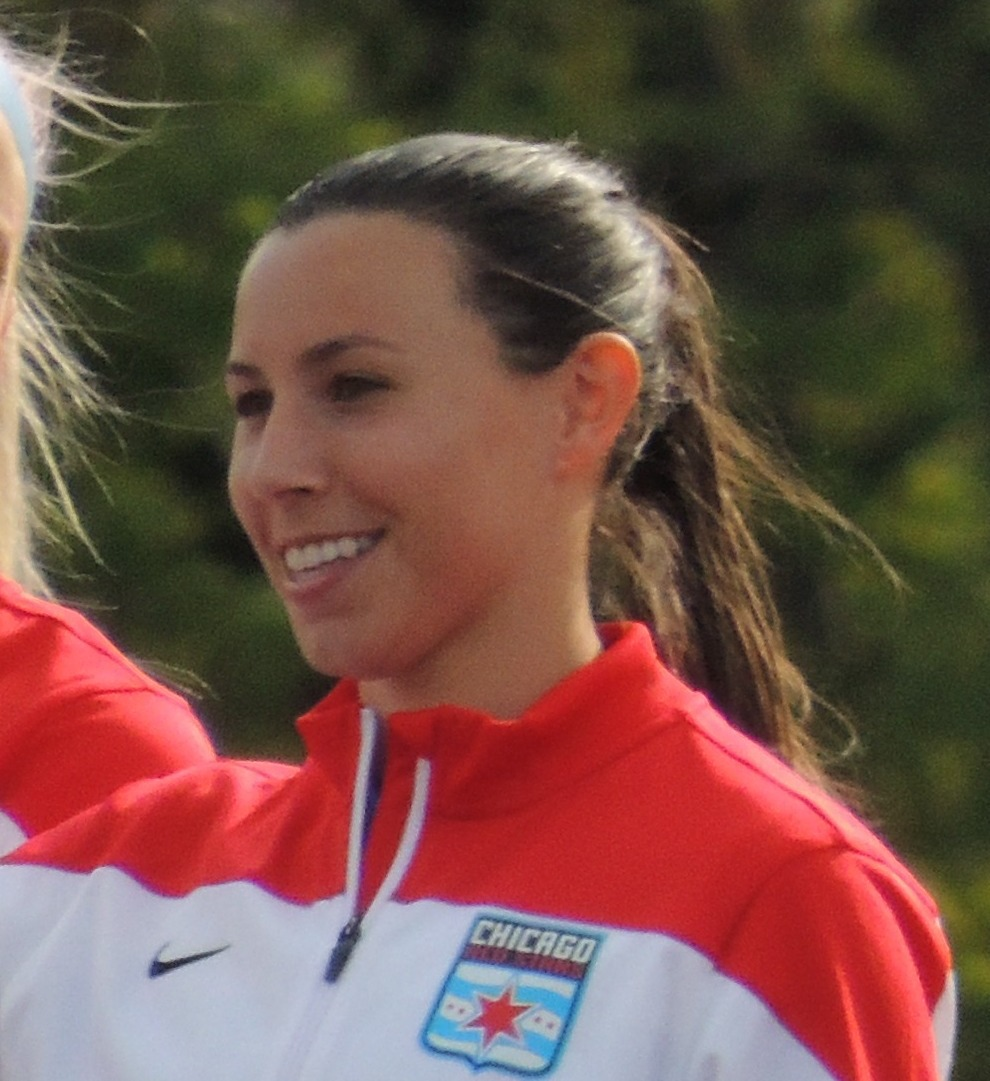
Unsung Hero Vanessa DiBernardo

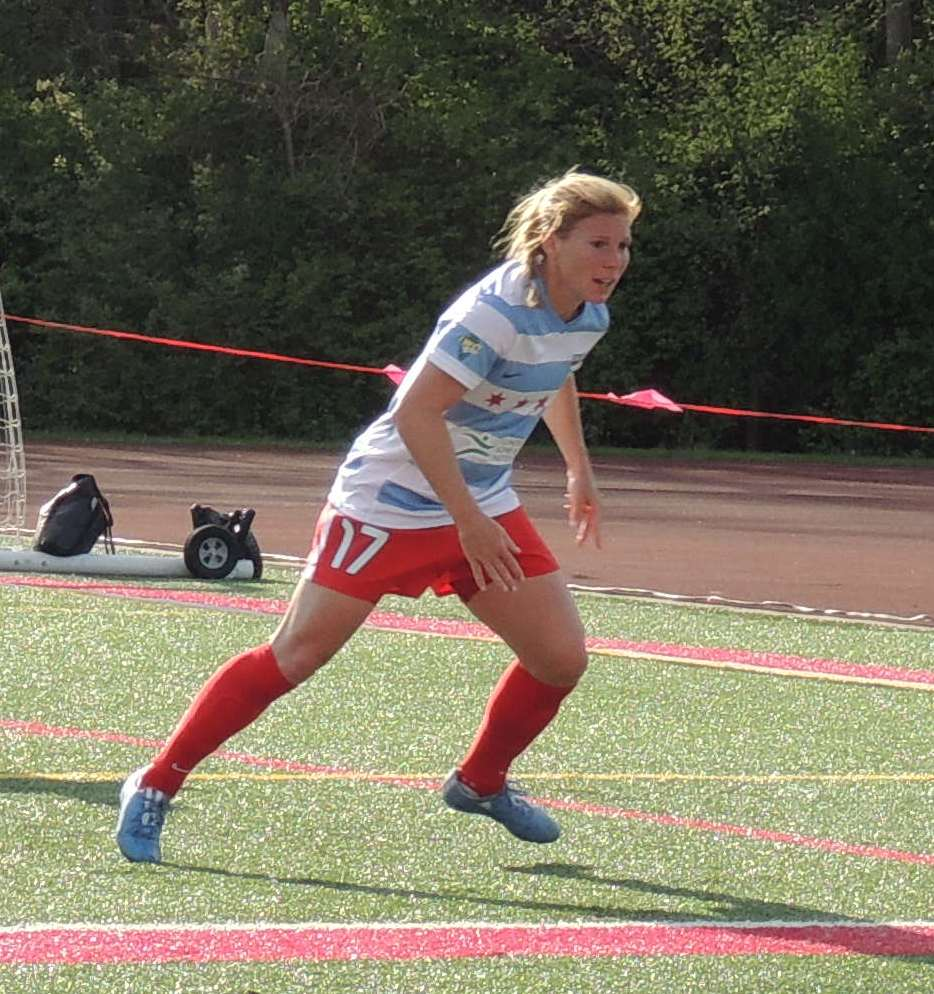
Iron Woman of Character Lori Chalupny
