= Jen Hoy =

American former professional soccer forward

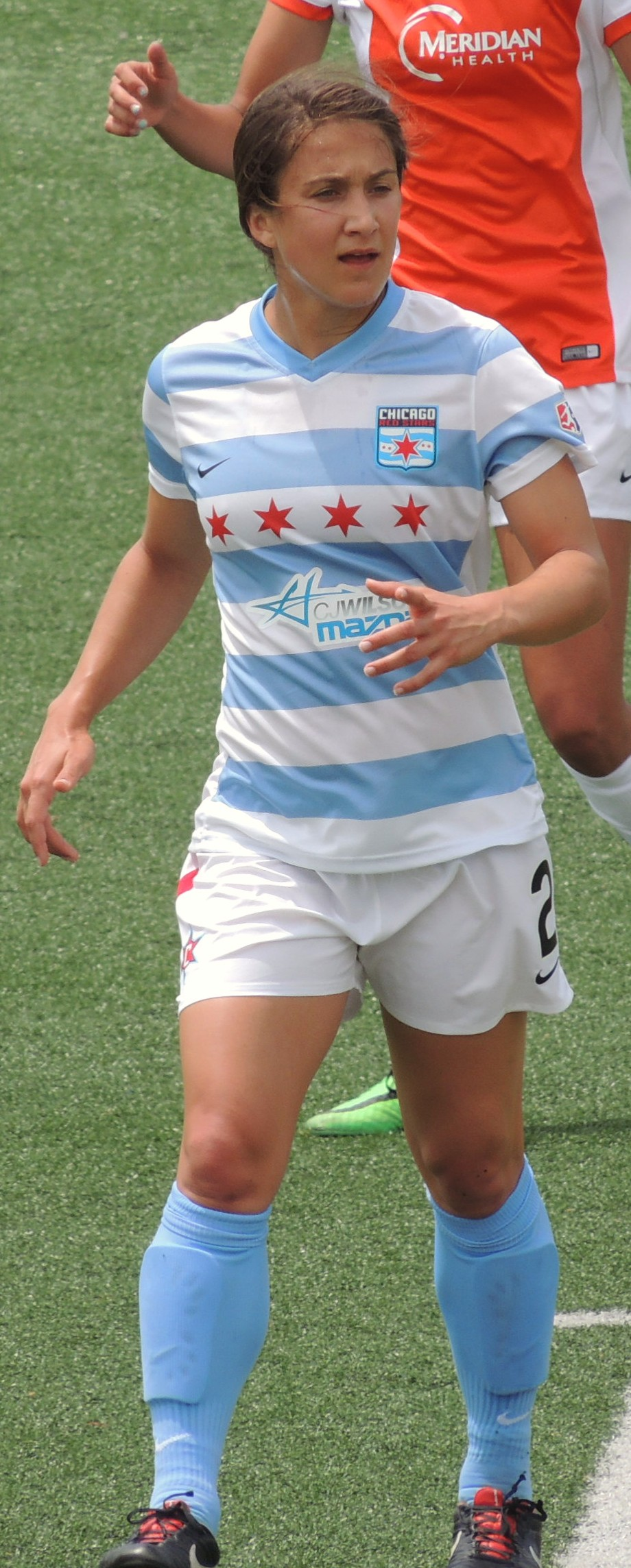
- Hoy playing for the Red Stars on July 15, 2014

Personal information
- Full name: Jennifer Rose Hoy
- Date of birth: January 18, 1991 (age 35)
- Place of birth: Sellersville, Pennsylvania, United States
- Height: 5 ft 5 in (1.65 m)
- Positions: Forward; midfielder

Youth career
- 2008–2009: FC Bucks Vipers

College career
Years	Team	Apps	(Gls)
2009–2012	Princeton Tigers	69	(36)

Senior career*
Years	Team	Apps	(Gls)
2013–2017	Chicago Red Stars	78	(15)
2016–2017	→ Newcastle Jets (loan)	12	(5)
2018–2019	Sky Blue FC	31	(2)

International career
2013–2014	United States U23		
- * Club domestic league appearances and goals

Jennifer Rose Hoy (born January 18, 1991) is an American former professional soccer forward. She played for Chicago Red Stars and Sky Blue FC of the NWSL.

== Early life ==
Raised in Sellersville, Pennsylvania, Hoy attended Germantown Academy where she finished her high school career with 110 goals and 46 assists. She scored 36 goals during her senior year. Hoy was voted three-time league MVP and was named by the Philadelphia Inquirer as Player of the Year the same year. Hoy also earned all-league and all-state honors as a track athlete. She was also a gymnast for eight years before choosing soccer as her primary sport.

Hoy played for club team, FC Bucks Vipers, and helped the team win state cups for six seasons. The team also placed third nationally in 2008 and won the 2009 U-18 US Youth Soccer national title.

=== Princeton University ===
Hoy attended Princeton University, where she played for the Princeton Tigers from 2009 to 2012. During the 2010 season, she led the Ivy League in game-winning goals with four as a sophomore. During her junior season, she earned Ivy League Player of the Week honors twice and started in all 17 games. As a senior, she ranked second in Princeton's history for most goals scored in a season, with 18. The same year, she was named Ivy League Player of the Week three times. She also recorded three hat tricks on the season and scored two game-winning goals.

In 2012, she was the final player awarded Ivy League Player of the Year before the award was split to honor the Offensive and Defensive Players of the Year separately in 2013.

== Club career ==
=== Chicago Red Stars, 2013–2017 ===
Hoy was selected during the fourth round (25th overall) of the 2013 NWSL College Draft by the Chicago Red Stars for the inaugural season of the National Women's Soccer League. She scored her first goal for the Red Stars in a match against the Seattle Reign FC on July 25, 2013. On August 18, 2013, Jen Hoy scored 2 goals in a come from behind 2–1 upset win over FC Kansas City; and was named NWSL Week 19 Player of the Week, and finished her rookie season with 3 goals and 1 assist in only 481 minutes in nine games.

In 2014, Hoy played in 21 matches, scored 4 goals for the Red Stars including a joint team high with Vanessa DiBernardo of 2 game winning goals, and provided a joint team high with Alyssa Mautz of 3 assists.

In 2015, Hoy played 1110 minutes in 18 matches, and scored 4 goals for the Red Stars including a game-winning goal; and provided 4 assists one less than team leader Vanessa DiBernardo.

In 2016 Hoy suffered a plantar fascia injury and played 674 in 15 matches, and scored 2 goals.

Hoy appeared in 14 games in 2017 and scored 2 goals for Chicago.

==== Loan to Newcastle Jets ====
On October 28, 2016, Hoy joined Australian club Newcastle Jets on loan. In 12 games with the Jets, she scored 5 goals.

=== Sky Blue FC, 2018–2019 ===
After five seasons in Chicago, Hoy was traded to Sky Blue FC on January 18, 2018, as part of a three-team trade that also included the Houston Dash. Due to injury Hoy only appeared in 10 games for Sky Blue in 2018.

She re-signed with the club prior to the 2019 NWSL season. On July 7, 2019, she scored her first goal for Sky Blue. Hoy scored in the 81st minute to make the score 2–0, Sky Blue would hold on to win 2–1. This was their first win of the 2019 season. Hoy scored again in their next game on July 13 against the Utah Royals. Her goal in second half stoppage time gave Sky Blue their second consecutive victory.

In February 2020, Hoy retired from soccer.

== International career ==
Hoy received her first call up to US U-23 National Camp in April 2013.
