= 2015 NWSL College Draft =

Soccer draft

General information
- Sport: Soccer
- Date: January 16, 2015
- Time: 9:30 AM ET
- Location: Philadelphia

Overview
- 36 total selections in 4 rounds
- First selection: Morgan Brian, Houston Dash
- Most selections: Chicago Red Stars (7 picks)
- Fewest selections: Portland Thorns FC (0 picks)

The 2015 NWSL College Draft was the third annual meeting of National Women's Soccer League (NWSL) franchises to select eligible college players. It was held on January 16, 2015, at the NSCAA Convention in Philadelphia, Pennsylvania.

== Format ==
- Draft order was determined by the final 2014 regular season standings.

== Results ==
=== Key ===
^{+}	Denotes player who has been selected as NWSL Most Valuable Player
^{*}	Denotes player who has been selected for an NWSL Best XI or NWSL Second XI team
^{^}	Denotes player who has been selected as NWSL Rookie of the Year
^{#}	Denotes player who has never appeared in an NWSL regular season or playoff game

=== Picks ===
Round	Pick	Nat.	Player	Pos.	NWSL team	Note	College
Round 1	1	(United States)	Morgan Brian	M	Houston Dash		Virginia
Round 1	2	(United States)	Sarah Killion	M	Sky Blue FC	(Note: Boston Breakers → Sky Blue FC. March 3, 2014: Boston Breakers sent a 2014 International Roster spot and their first-round selection in the 2015 draft to Sky Blue FC in exchange for forward Lisa De Vanna.)	UCLA
Round 1	3	(United States)	Abby Dahlkemper^{*}	D	Western New York Flash		UCLA
Round 1	4	(United States)	Sam Mewis^{*}	M	Western New York Flash	(Note: Sky Blue FC → Western New York Flash. November 24, 2014: Western New York Flash acquired the 4th overall pick in the 2015 draft and the rights to Elizabeth Eddy from Sky Blue FC in exchange for the rights to Samantha Kerr.)	UCLA
Round 1	5	(United States)	Stephanie McCaffrey	F	Chicago Red Stars		Boston College
Round 1	6	(United States)	Lynn Williams^{+*}	F	Western New York Flash	(Note: Washington Spirit → Western New York Flash. October 21, 2014: Western New York Flash acquired midfielder Jordan Angeli and the sixth overall pick in the 2015 NWSL College Draft for midfielder Angela Salem and defender Katherine Reynolds.)	Pepperdine
Round 1	7	(United States)	Jaelene Hinkle	D	Western New York Flash	(Note: Portland Thorns → Western New York Flash. April 5, 2014: The Western New York Flash acquired defenders Kat Williamson and Courtney Wetzel and a first-round pick in the 2015 NWSL College Draft from Portland Thorns FC. In exchange, Thorns FC received defender Sarah Huffman and a player to be named later.)	Texas Tech
Round 1	8	(United States)	Arin Gilliland^{*}	D	Chicago Red Stars	(Note: FC Kansas City → Chicago Red Stars. March 31, 2014: FC Kansas City acquired defender Amy LePeilbet in a trade with the Chicago Red Stars. In return, Chicago receives FC Kansas City's first round draft pick in the 2015 NWSL College Draft and one of the team's international roster spots for 2014 and 2015 seasons.)	Kentucky
Round 1	9	(United States)	Danielle Colaprico^{*^}	M	Chicago Red Stars	(Note: Seattle Reign FC → Boston Breakers → Chicago Red Stars. November 18, 2013: Seattle Reign FC acquired forward Sydney Leroux from the Boston Breakers in exchange for midfielder Kristie Mewis, goalkeeper Michelle Betos and the Reign's first-round and second-round selections in the 2015 NWSL College Draft. January 16, 2015: Boston Breakers sent the 9th pick and the 11th pick to Chicago Red Stars in exchange for the rights to midfielder Stephanie McCaffrey.)	Virginia
Round 2	10	(United States)	Kristin Grubka	D	Sky Blue FC	(Note: Houston Dash → Sky Blue FC. December 12, 2014: Houston Dash sent the 10th pick and the 28th pick to Sky Blue FC in exchange for the 13th pick, 31st pick, and the rights to midfielder Ashley Nick.)	Florida State
Round 2	11	(United States)	Sofia Huerta^{*}	F	Chicago Red Stars	(Note: Boston Breakers → Chicago Red Stars. January 16, 2015: Boston Breakers sent the 9th pick and the 11th pick to Chicago Red Stars in exchange for the rights to midfielder Stephanie McCaffrey.)	Santa Clara
Round 2	12	(United States)	Shea Groom^{*}	F	FC Kansas City	(Note: Western New York Flash → FC Kansas City. February 20, 2014: FC Kansas City sent an international roster slot to Western New York Flash for 2014 and 2015 in exchange for their second round draft pick in the 2015 College Draft.)	Texas A&M
Round 2	13	(United States)	Megan Oyster	D	Washington Spirit	(Note: Sky Blue FC → Houston Dash → Portland Thorns → Washington Spirit. December 12, 2014: Houston Dash sent the 10th pick and the 28th pick to Sky Blue FC in exchange for the 13th pick, 31st pick, and the rights to midfielder Ashley Nick. January 16, 2015: Portland Thorns FC acquired the 13th pick and a 2nd round pick in 2016 from Houston Dash in exchange for player to be named later. January 16, 2015: Washington Spirit acquired the 13th pick and a 2nd round pick in 2016 from the Portland Thorns FC for Jodie Taylor)	UCLA
Round 2	14	(United States)	Jamia Fields	F	Boston Breakers	(Note: Chicago Red Stars → Portland Thorns FC → Boston Breakers. January 13, 2014: Chicago Red Stars acquired Karina LeBlanc from the Portland Thorns FC in exchange for their 2015 College Draft second-round selection. January 17, 2014: Portland Thorns FC traded the 7th pick in the 4th round of the 2014 NWSL College Draft and their 2nd round pick in the 2015 college draft to Boston Breakers for Michelle Betos.)	Florida State
Round 2	15	(Jamaica)	Havana Solaun	M	Seattle Reign FC	(Note: Washington Spirit → Seattle Reign FC. March 18, 2013: Washington Spirit acquired FC Bayern Munich defender Niki Cross via a trade with Seattle Reign FC. In exchange, Seattle Reign FC will receive the Spirit's second-round pick in the 2015 NWSL College Draft.)	Florida
Round 2	16	(United States)	Meghan Streight	D	FC Kansas City	(Note: Portland Thorns FC → Seattle Reign FC → FC Kansas City. December 10, 2013: Portland Thorns FC acquired defender Nikki Marshall and the No. 9 pick in the 2014 NWSL College Draft from Seattle Reign FC in exchange for Portland's No. 6 pick in the 2014 NWSL College Draft and a second-round pick in the 2015 Draft. November 12, 2014: FC Kansas City sent Merritt Mathias to Seattle Reign FC in exchange for Kate Deines and the 16th (2nd round) and 26th (3rd round) overall draft picks.)	Texas A&M
Round 2	17	(United States)	Katelyn Rowland^{*}	G	FC Kansas City		UCLA
Round 2	18	(United States)	Tatiana Coleman^{#}	F	Western New York Flash	(Note: Seattle Reign FC → Boston Breakers → Western New York Flash. November 18, 2013: Seattle Reign FC acquired forward Sydney Leroux from the Boston Breakers in exchange for midfielder Kristie Mewis, goalkeeper Michelle Betos and the Reign's first-round and second-round selections in the 2015 NWSL College Draft. November 3, 2014: Boston Breakers traded the 18th pick in the 2nd round of the 2015 NWSL College Draft to Western New York Flash for Amy Barczuk.)	UCF
Round 3	19	(United States)	Caprice Dydasco *	D	Washington Spirit	(Note: Houston Dash → FC Kansas City → Washington Spirit. July 9, 2014: Houston Dash acquired forward Melissa Henderson from FC Kansas City in exchange for their third round pick in the 2015 NWSL College Draft. January 16, 2015: Washington Spirit acquired the 19th overall pick from FC Kansas City in exchange for two second round picks in 2016.)	UCLA
Round 3	20	(United States)	Sam Lofton	D	Boston Breakers		James Madison
Round 3	21	(Canada)	Sabrina D'Angelo	G	Western New York Flash		South Carolina
Round 3	22	(France)	Daphné Corboz	M	Sky Blue FC		Georgetown
Round 3	23	(United States)	Cara Walls	F	Chicago Red Stars		Wisconsin
Round 3	24	(United States)	Bianca Brinson^{#}	F	Boston Breakers	(Note: Washington Spirit → Boston Breakers. June 18, 2014: Washington Spirit sent defender Bianca Sierra and their third and fourth round picks in the 2015 NWSL College Draft to the Boston Breakers in exchange for Lisa De Vanna and a 2014 international roster spot.)	Texas A&M
Round 3	25	(United States)	Shade Pratt	D	Sky Blue FC	(Note: Portland Thorns FC→ Sky Blue FC. January 14, 2015: Portland Thorns FC acquired the rights to defender Kendall Johnson from Sky Blue FC in exchange for the 25th and 34th overall selections in the 2015 NWSL College Draft.)	Maryland
Round 3	26	(United States)	Jessica Ayers^{#}	M	FC Kansas City	(Note: FC Kansas City → Seattle Reign FC → FC Kansas City. December 5, 2013: FC Kansas City acquired forward Liz Bogus and the 17th overall selection in the 2014 NWSL College Draft from Seattle Reign FC in exchange for the 15th overall pick in the 2014 NWSL College Draft and FC Kansas City's third round pick in the 2015 College Draft. November 12, 2014: FC Kansas City sent Merritt Mathias to Seattle Reign FC in exchange for Kate Deines and the 16th (2nd round) and 26th (3rd round) overall draft picks.)	Colorado College
Round 3	27	(Canada)	Nicole Setterlund^{#}	M	Chicago Red Stars	(Note: Seattle Reign FC → Boston Breakers → Chicago Red Stars. October 23, 2013: Seattle Reign FC sent their 3rd round picks in the 2014 and 2015 NWSL College Draft to the Boston Breakers in exchange for midfielder Mariah Nogueira. October 29, 2013: Chicago Red Stars acquired the rights to defender Casey Short and a third round pick in the 2015 NWSL College Draft from the Boston Breakers in exchange for the 11th overall pick in the 2014 NWSL College Draft.)	Washington State
Round 4	28	(England)	Chioma Ubogagu	F	Sky Blue FC	(Note: Houston Dash → Sky Blue FC. December 12, 2014: Houston Dash sent the 10th pick and the 28th pick to Sky Blue FC in exchange for the 13th pick, 31st pick, and the rights to midfielder Ashley Nick.)	Stanford
Round 4	29	(United States)	Stephanie Verdoia	F	Boston Breakers		Seattle
Round 4	30	(United States)	Whitney Church	D	Washington Spirit	(Note: Western New York Flash → Washington Spirit. March 3, 2014: Washington Spirit acquired midfielder Verónica Pérez and a fourth round pick in the 2015 NWSL College Draft from Western New York Flash in exchange for an international roster spot for the 2014 and 2015 seasons.)	Penn State
Round 4	31	(United States)	Carleigh Williams	D	Houston Dash	(Note: Sky Blue FC → Houston Dash. December 12, 2014: Houston Dash sent the 10th pick and the 28th pick to Sky Blue FC in exchange for the 13th pick, 31st pick, and the rights to midfielder Ashley Nick.)	UCF
Round 4	32	(United States)	Rachel Tejada	F	Chicago Red Stars		Illinois State
Round 4	33	(United States)	Bianca Calderone^{#}	D	Boston Breakers	(Note: Washington Spirit → Boston Breakers. June 18, 2014: Washington Spirit sent defender Bianca Sierra and their third and fourth round picks in the 2015 NWSL College Draft to the Boston Breakers in exchange for Lisa De Vanna and a 2014 international roster spot.)	Northeastern
Round 4	34	(United States)	Lo'eau LaBonta*	F	Sky Blue FC	(Note: Portland Thorns FC→ Sky Blue FC. January 14, 2015: Portland Thorns FC acquired the rights to defender Kendall Johnson from Sky Blue FC in exchange for the 25th and 34th overall selections in the 2015 NWSL College Draft.)	Stanford
Round 4	35	(United States)	Kaysie Clark	M	FC Kansas City		Missouri
Round 4	36	(United States)	Kendall Romine^{#}	D	Seattle Reign FC		Stanford

=== Notable undrafted players ===
Below is a list of undrafted rookies who appeared in a competitive NWSL game in 2015.

Nat.	Player	Pos.	Original NWSL team	College	Notes
(United States)	Allie Bailey	M	Houston Dash	Texas A&M	
(United States)	Kate Bennett	M	Portland Thorns FC	Washington	
(United States)	Taylor Comeau	D	Portland Thorns FC	California	
(United States)	Theresa Diederich	M	Sky Blue FC	Alabama	
(United States)	Kelsey Haycook	F	Portland Thorns FC	La Salle	
(United States)	Riley Houle	M	Boston Breakers	UConn	
(United States)	Chanel Johnson	M	Boston Breakers	Hartford	
(United States)	Alyssa Kleiner	D	Portland Thorns FC	Santa Clara	
(United States)	Lauren Lazo	D	Boston Breakers	Princeton	
(United States)	Mary Luba	M	Chicago Red Stars	Marquette	
(United States)	Cami Privett	M	Houston Dash	UC Irvine	
(United States)	Caroline Stanley	G	Seattle Reign FC	USC	
(Netherlands)	Maruschka Waldus	D	Sky Blue FC	Alabama	

== Trades ==
Round 1:

Round 2:

Round 3:

Round 4:

== Summary ==
In 2015, a total of 24 colleges had players selected. Of these, 11 had a player drafted to the NWSL for the first time: Colorado College, Illinois State, James Madison, Kentucky, Missouri, Northeastern, Seattle, South Carolina, Texas A&M, Washington State and Wisconsin.

=== Schools with multiple draft selections ===
Selections	Schools
6	UCLA
3	Stanford, Texas A&M
2	Florida State, UCF, Virginia

=== Selections by college athletic conference ===
Conference	Round 1	Round 2	Round 3	Round 4	Total
ACC	3	2	0	0	5
Big East	0	0	1	0	1
Big Ten	0	0	2	1	3
Big 12	1	0	0	0	1
Colonial	0	0	1	1	2
Missouri Valley	0	0	0	1	1
Mountain West	0	0	1	0	1
Pac-12	3	2	1	3	9
SEC	1	3	3	1	8
The American	0	1	0	1	2
WAC	0	0	0	1	1
West Coast	1	1	0	0	2

=== Selections by position ===
Position	Round 1	Round 2	Round 3	Round 4	Total
Goalkeeper	0	1	1	0	2
Defender	3	3	3	4	13
Midfielder	4	1	3	1	9
Forward	2	4	2	4	12

== See also ==
- List of NWSL drafts
- List of National Women's Soccer League draftees by college team
- 2015 National Women's Soccer League season
