= Courtney Raetzman =

American soccer player

Personal information
- Full name: Courtney Raetzman
- Date of birth: April 9, 1994 (age 32)
- Place of birth: Elk Grove, Illinois
- Height: 4 ft 11 in (1.50 m)
- Position: Midfielder

College career
Years	Team	Apps	(Gls)
2012–2015	Kentucky Wildcats		

Senior career*
Years	Team	Apps	(Gls)
2014	Ottawa Fury		
2016	Chicago Red Stars	6	(0)

International career
2011–2012	United States U18		
- * Club domestic league appearances and goals

Courtney Raetzman (born April 9, 1994) is an American former soccer midfielder player who played for Chicago Red Stars in the NWSL.

== Club career ==
After four years playing at the University of Kentucky, Raetzman was drafted by Chicago Red Stars with the 32nd overall pick in the 2016 NWSL College Draft. She was named to the Red Stars 2016 Opening Day Roster and appeared in 6 games. She was waived by the team ahead of the 2017 season.

== Career statistics ==
Appearances and goals by club, season and competition
Club	Season	League			Playoffs (Note: Includes NWSL playoffs)		Total	
Club	Season	Division	Apps	Goals	Apps	Goals	Apps	Goals
Chicago Red Stars	2016	NWSL	6	0	0	0	6	0
Career total			6	0	0	0	6	0
