= Sam Lofton =

American soccer player (born 1992)

Personal information
- Full name: Samantha Jane Lofton
- Date of birth: April 29, 1992 (age 34)
- Place of birth: Horsham, Pennsylvania, United States
- Height: 5 ft 8 in (1.73 m)
- Position: Defender

Youth career
- Central Mountain High School

College career
Years	Team	Apps	(Gls)
2010–2014	James Madison Dukes	80	(6)

Senior career*
Years	Team	Apps	(Gls)
2015	Boston Breakers	0	(0)
2016	Portland Thorns FC	3	(0)
2016	Sunnanå SK	6	(0)
2017–2018	Breiðablik UBK	24	(0)
- * Club domestic league appearances and goals as of July 20, 2018

Samantha Jane Lofton (born April 29, 1992) is an American former soccer defender who last played for Breiðablik UBK of Úrvalsdeild kvenna, and previously played for Boston Breakers and Portland Thorns FC of National Women's Soccer League.

== College career ==
Coming from a standout career in high school where she earned several honors. Sam Lofton debuted for James Madison Dukes in 2010. Along her entire career at Dukes, Lofton recorded a total of 80 appearances with six goals. She also earned several important honors, such as being named to CAA All-Academic team in 2013 and 2014, to the First Team All-CAA honoree in 2014 and Second Team NSCAA All-Mid-Atlantic Region honoree in 2014.

== Club career ==
After spending some time with Washington Spirit Reserves in the W-League and helping the team to reach the W-League Final for the first time, she was picked by Boston Breakers in the 20th overall of the 2015 NWSL College Draft and became the first James Madison University player to be drafted by a NWSL team.

In 2016 Lofton went to Portland Thorns FC. In the same year, she signed with Sunnanå SK of Damallsvenskan, the highest women's soccer division in Sweden.

In 2017, Lofton played for Breiðablik UBK of Úrvalsdeild kvenna in the first division of Iceland.

== Post-soccer career ==
Lofton is now a meditation counselor.
