= Arin Wright =

American soccer player (born 1992)

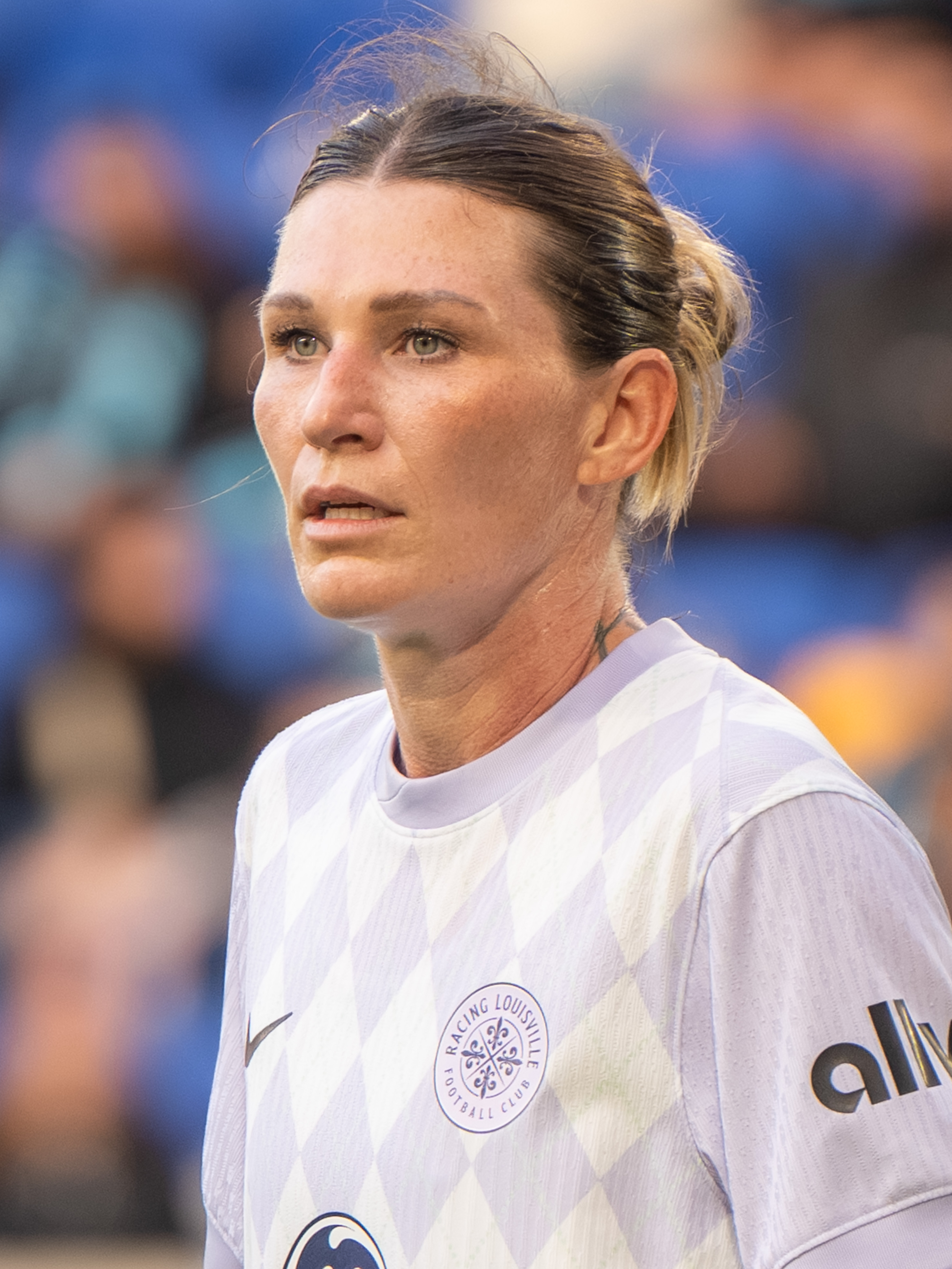
- Arin Wright with Racing Louisville in 2025

Personal information
- Full name: Arin Hadley Wright
- Birth name: Arin Hadley Walton Gilliland
- Date of birth: December 25, 1992 (age 33)
- Place of birth: Lexington, Kentucky, United States
- Height: 5 ft 7 in (1.70 m)
- Position: Center back

Team information
- Current team: Racing Louisville FC
- Number: 3

College career
Years	Team	Apps	(Gls)
2011–2014	Kentucky Wildcats		(30)

Senior career*
Years	Team	Apps	(Gls)
–2014	Ottawa Fury		
2015–2023	Chicago Red Stars	152	(2)
2016–2019	→ Newcastle Jets (loan)	22	(10)
2024–	Racing Louisville FC	69	(2)

International career
2011	United States U20		
2013–2014	United States U23		
- * Club domestic league appearances and goals as of 05:56, November 2, 2026 (UTC)

Arin Hadley Wright (born Arin Hadley Walton Gilliland; December 25, 1992) is an American professional soccer player who plays as a defender for Racing Louisville FC of the National Women's Soccer League (NWSL). She previously played for the Chicago Red Stars and Australian club Newcastle Jets.

Wright played college soccer for the Kentucky Wildcats. She was drafted by the Red Stars as the eighth overall pick in the 2015 NWSL College Draft.

== Youth career ==
Wright attended and played for West Jessamine High School where she was named All-American, as well as Kentucky's Miss Soccer. Wright played club soccer for Ohio Elite. In 2007 was named second team All-State, and in 2008 was named Underclassman Athlete of the Year of Jessamine County, and Academic First Team Region 14. In 2009 was named Central Kentucky Soccer Conference Most Valuable Player. Wright was named to Kentucky First team All-State in 2009 and 2010.

== College career ==
In 2014, while at Kentucky, Wright was awarded the Honda Inspiration Award which is given to a collegiate athlete "who has overcome hardship and was able to return to play at the collegiate level". She overcame a serious injury and the loss of her mother to cancer as a freshman, but rebounded to become one of the top soccer players in the country.

Over the course of her college career, she was named First Team All-American, ESPNW Female Athlete of the Year finalist, SEC Defensive Player of the Year, First Team All-SEC, 2014 HONDA Award winner, and MAC Hermann Award finalist. During her four years playing for Wildcats, Wright played over 7,000 minutes, scored 30 goals and provided 25 assists. Wright set a new Wildcat record of eight career game-winning goals.

== Club career ==
=== Chicago Red Stars ===
Wright was selected with the eighth overall pick in the 2015 NWSL College Draft by the Chicago Red Stars. The Red Stars had acquired the pick along with an international roster spot for the 2014 and 2015 seasons from FC Kansas City in exchange for defender Amy LePeilbet. In her first season, Wright played 19 games for the Red Stars, starting in 17, for a total of 1533 minutes and provided 2 assists.

In 2016, she was named to the NWSL Best XI for the season and nominated for the Defender of the Year award. In 2017, Wright appeared in all 24 regular season matches for the Red Stars and their single post-season appearance. Wright started in 24 of those games, resulting in a combined total of 2,130 minutes on the field and 4 assists.

==== Loan to Newcastle Jets ====
On November 1, 2016, Wright joined Newcastle Jets on loan. In October 2017 she extended her loan for another season. On November 26, 2018, Wright returned to Newcastle for the remainder of the 2018-19 W-League season, marking her third consecutive year with the team.

=== Racing Louisville ===
She was traded to Racing Louisville FC in January 2024.

== International career ==
Wright competed with United States youth national teams at various age-groups:under-15, under-18, under-20, under-23, Wright received her first international call up to the senior team on October 6, 2016. Wright's call-up marks the first time a University of Kentucky player has been chosen to play for the USWNT.

== Personal life ==
Arin Wright is the daughter of Letita (née Walton) and Bruce Gilliland, and has a sibling Saylor. Her mother had great influence on her soccer career. She married her husband Evan Wright in October 2018. In October 2019, the two announced they were expecting a baby in April 2020.

== Career statistics ==
=== Club ===
As of March 12, 2025

Appearances and goals by club, season and competition
Club	Season	League			Cup (Note: Includes the NWSL Challenge Cup, The Women's Cup, and NWSL x Liga MX Femenil Summer Cup)		Playoffs (Note: Includes NWSL Playoffs)		Total	
Club	Season	Division	Apps	Goals	Apps	Goals	Apps	Goals	Apps	Goals
Chicago Red Stars	2015	NWSL	19	0	—		1	0	20	0
Chicago Red Stars	2016	NWSL	20	0	—		1	0	21	0
Chicago Red Stars	2017	NWSL	22	0	—		1	0	23	0
Chicago Red Stars	2018	NWSL	24	0	—		1	0	25	0
Newcastle Jets (loan)	2018-19	W-League	8	2	—		—		8	2
Chicago Red Stars	2019	NWSL	17	1	—		—		17	1
Chicago Red Stars	2020	NWSL	—		1	0	—		1	0
Chicago Red Stars	2021	NWSL	20	0	3	0	3	0	26	0
Chicago Red Stars	2022	NWSL	10	0	6	1	1	0	17	1
Chicago Red Stars	2023	NWSL	20	1	3	0	—		23	1
Racing Louisville FC	2024	NWSL	22	0	3	0	—		25	0
Racing Louisville FC	2025	NWSL	22	1	2	0	1	0	25	1
Career total			204	5	18	1	9	0	231	6

== Honors and awards ==
Chicago Red Stars

- NWSL Championship runner-up: 2021

Racing Louisville

- The Women's Cup: 2025

Individual

- NWSL Best XI: 2016
- NWSL Second XI: 2015
