= Vanessa DiBernardo =

American soccer player (born 1992)

- DiBernardo with the Kansas City Current in 2026

Personal information
- Full name: Vanessa Sue DiBernardo
- Date of birth: May 15, 1992 (age 34)
- Place of birth: Naperville, Illinois, U.S.
- Height: 5 ft 4 in (1.63 m)
- Position: Midfielder

Team information
- Current team: Kansas City Current
- Number: 16

Youth career
- 2000–2010: America's Soccer Club
- 2007–2010: Waubonsie Valley
- 2008: Chicago Red Eleven

College career
| Years | Team | Apps | (Gls) |
| 2010–2013 | Illinois Fighting Illini | 73 | (43) |

Senior career*
| Years | Team | Apps | (Gls) |
| 2011 | Chicago Red Stars (WPSL) | | |
| 2012–2013 | Chicago Eclipse Select | | |
| 2014–2022 | Chicago Red Stars | 155 | (12) |
| 2015–2017 | → Perth Glory (loan) | 22 | (12) |
| 2023– | Kansas City Current | 64 | (6) |

International career^{‡}
- United States U-17
| 2011–2012 | United States U-20 | 20 | (3) |
| 2013–2015 | United States U-23 | 7 | (1) |
- * Club domestic league appearances and goals as of 16:47, November 14, 2026 (UTC) ‡ National team caps and goals as of January 25, 2014

Vanessa Sue DiBernardo (born May 15, 1992) is an American professional soccer player who plays as a midfielder for Kansas City Current of the National Women's Soccer League (NWSL). She previously played for the Chicago Red Stars, which she captained. With the Current, she won the NWSL Shield in 2025 and the NWSL Championship in 2026, being named championship MVP.

Internationally, DiBernardo was part of the United States under-20 team that won the 2012 FIFA U-20 Women's World Cup.

== Early life ==
DiBernardo was raised in Naperville, Illinois, where she attended Waubonsie Valley High School and helped lead the soccer team to state championship wins in 2007, 2008, and 2010. In 2009, she was named to the ESPN Rise All-American Third Team and earned Beacon News Girls Soccer Player of the Year and Chicago Sun-Times All-Area honors. During her senior year in 2010, she was named Gatorade Illinois Player of the Year, IHSSCA Illinois Player of the Year, and was ranked fifty-first in the country for high school seniors by Top Drawer Soccer.

== College career ==
=== University of Illinois ===
As a freshman in 2010, DiBernardo led the Big Ten Conference in goals and points and was named the Big Ten Freshman of the Year. During her sophomore year, she led her team with 17 goals and was named to the MAC Hermann Trophy Watch List. Despite missing a portion of her junior season due to the 2012 U-20 World Cup, DiBernardo still led the Illini in points, goals, and shots. In October 2012, she was named Player of the Week by the Big Ten Conference, Top Drawer Soccer and College Sports Madness after scoring a hat-trick and helping the team defeat the University of Michigan. Unable to play the full season again due to a knee injury which kept her out for seven games, she tallied seven goals in 15 games and had a career high seven assists. DiBernardo finished her Illini career setting the school's record for most career assists and tying the school's record for most career shots. She was named to the Hermann Trophy Watch List for a third time. In 2014, she was awarded the Big Ten Medal of Honor, which recognizes one male and one female student from the graduating class of each Big Ten member school, for demonstrating joint athletic and academic excellence throughout their college career.

== Club career ==
=== Chicago Red Eleven ===
In 2008, DiBernardo played for the Chicago Red Eleven in the W-League.

=== Chicago Red Stars, 2014–2022 ===
DiBernardo was selected as the fourth overall pick in the 2014 NWSL College Draft by the Chicago Red Stars. She previously played for Red Stars' head coach Rory Dames with the Red Stars' WPSL team in 2011 and with the Chicago Eclipse Select in 2012–2013. Of her and Julie Johnston's signing, Coach Dames said, "In Julie and Vanessa, we picked up the best holding midfielder and the best attacking midfielder in the draft. They will form the spine of our team down the middle for years to come. With both of them having the experience of winning the U20 World Cup, they are both proven winners at the highest level."

In her rookie season DiBernardo appeared in 23 out of 24 matches and scored 1 goal and provided 3 assists.

In 2015 DiBernardo played in all 21 matches for the Red Stars, she scored 2 goals and provide 5 assists, and was voted by fans as the team Unsung Hero. The Red Stars finished the season in 2nd place and qualified for the play-offs for the first time. Chicago lost to FC Kansas City 3–0 in the semi-final.

DiBernardo once again played in every match for Chicago in 2016. She provided 7 assists in 2016 which led the team and was the second highest in the league. Chicago once again qualified for the play-offs but lost the semi-final in extra time to the Washington Spirit. DiBernardo was named to the 2016 NWSL Second XI.

In 2017 DiBernardo appeared in 21 games and scored 3 goals. Chicago was eliminated in the semi-finals for the third straight season.

DiBernardo suffered a stress fracture in her hip during the 2018 Thorns Spring Invitational which would sideline her for the first two months of the 2018 NWSL season. She returned to the field on June 17 against the Portland Thorns. DiBernardo appeared in 12 games in 2018 and scored 2 goals. She was named to the NWSL Best XI for the month of August.

DiBernardo logged significant playing time in 2019, starting 20 regular season matches and all of Chicago's playoff matches on their run to the 2019 NWSL Championship final, where they fell 0–4 to the North Carolina Courage. In July, she won another monthly NWSL Best XI award.

Adapting to the unique 2020 NWSL schedule, DiBernardo featured in both the NWSL Challenge Cup and NWSL Fall Series, starting in all of Chicago's knockout round matches en route to the 2020 NWSL Challenge Cup final, where the team lost 0–2 to the Houston Dash. She registered a goal and an assist in a September 20 match against Sky Blue FC.

In 2021, DiBernardo started in the NWSL Championship final for the third straight year with the Red Stars, but her game was cut short by a 12th-minute injury. Chicago fell short again, losing 1–2 to the Washington Spirit.

DiBernardo was named team captain of the Red Stars for the 2022 season. She played 2,433 minutes across all club competitions in 2022, starting in 29 matches across the regular season, NWSL Challenge Cup, and postseason. She was named NWSL Player of the Month in September.

==== Loan to Perth Glory ====
DiBernardo joined Perth Glory of the W-League on loan for the 2015–16 season. She returned to Perth for the 2016–17 season and scored 6 goals in 14 games. Perth advanced to the 2017 Grand Final but lost to Melbourne City 2–0.

=== Kansas City Current, 2023– ===
DiBernardo signed a two-year contract as a free agent with the Kansas City Current on December 7, 2022. She made her debut for Kansas City on April 15, 2023. She scored a goal and had an assist in a 2023 NWSL Challenge Cup match against her former Chicago Red Stars team on June 14, 2023.

DiBernardo joined the Kansas City Current as a free agent in December 2022, signing a two-year contract. She debuted in April 2023 and scored a goal and contributed an assist against her former team, the Chicago Red Stars, in a NWSL Challenge Cup match that June. Her 2023 season was cut short with a concussion sustained against the Portland Thorns later in June. She would be placed on the Season Ending Injury list before the final match of the regular season.

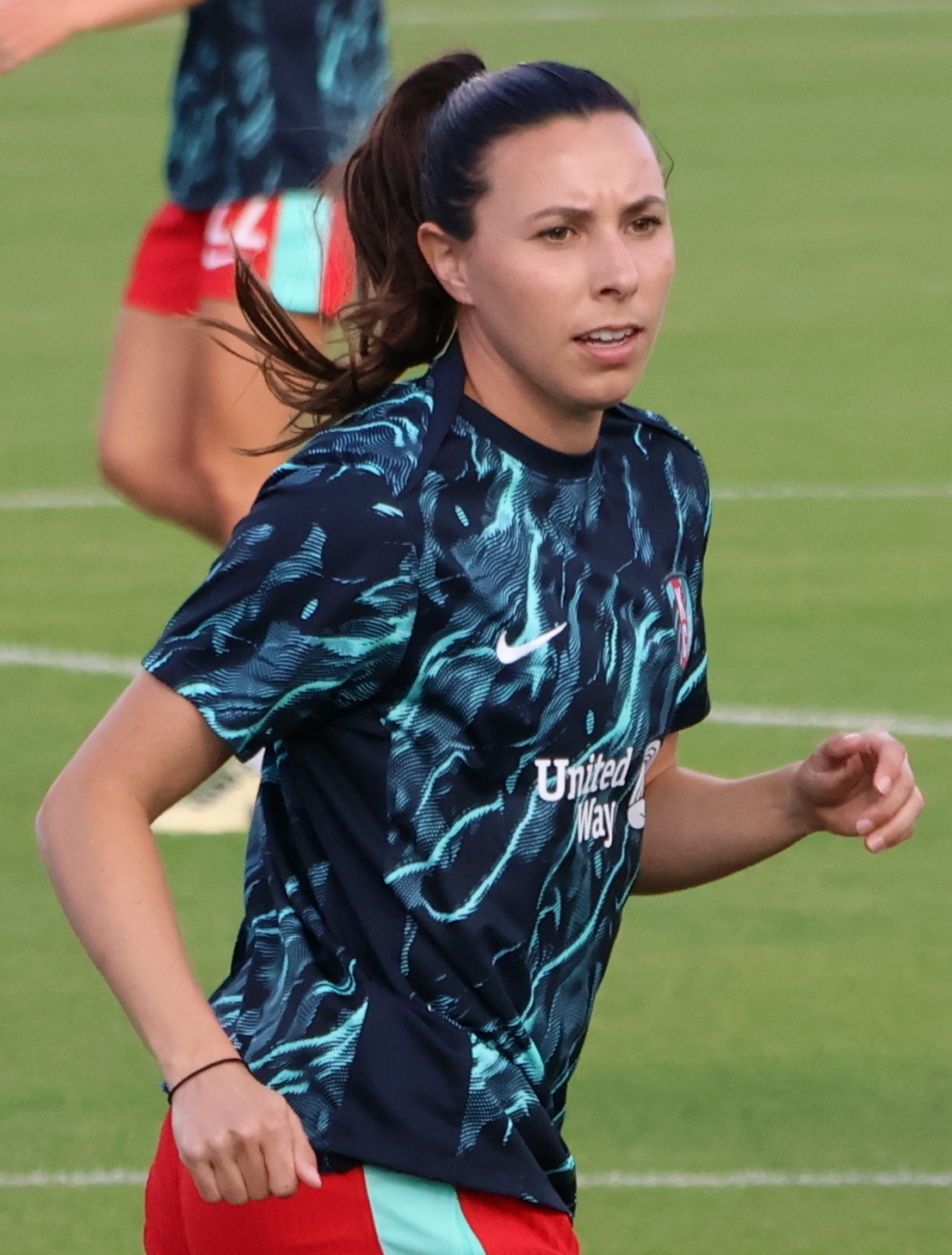
DiBernardo with Kansas City Current in 2025

Vanessa DiBernardo scored the first-ever goal at CPKC Stadium on opening day of the 2024 season. Her goal helped propel the Kansas City Current to a 5–4 victory over Portland Thorns FC.

On November 21, 2026, DiBernardo scored the opening goal of the 2026 NWSL Championship against the Washington Spirit, helping the Current win their first NWSL title. She scored directly from a corner kick in the 54th minute of the eventual 2–1 victory and was named championship MVP.

== International career ==
DiBernardo has represented the United States at the under-20 and under-23 levels. During the 2012 FIFA U-20 Women's World Cup, she helped the U.S. advance to the semi-finals after scoring the game-opening goal against China. The team defeated China 2–1. The team later defeated Germany 1–0 to clinch the championship.

In August 2013, DiBernardo was called up to the senior national team camp ahead of a friendly match against Mexico on September 3 while still in college. She did not end up playing in the match.

In December 2019, DiBernardo was called up for a training camp with the senior national team.

== Personal life ==
DiBernardo's father Angelo competed at the 1984 Summer Olympics and other international matches as a member of the USA men's national soccer team; they are the only father/daughter relationship among soccer players who have represented the USA. Her father was born in Argentina of Italian descent, so she would be eligible to play for either country's national team.

DiBernardo married Andy Miltonberger in December 2021 and announced that she was pregnant in July 2025.

== Honors ==
Kansas City Current

- NWSL Championship: 2026
- NWSL Shield: 2025
- NWSL x Liga MX Femenil Summer Cup: 2024

United States U20

- CONCACAF U-20 Women's Championship: 2012
- FIFA U-20 Women's World Cup: 2012

Individual

- NWSL Second XI: 2016, 2024
- NWSL Championship Most Valuable Player: 2026

== See also ==
- 2012 FIFA U-20 Women's World Cup squads
