= Mary Luba =

American professional soccer midfielder (born 1993)

Personal information
- Full name: Mary Bridget Luba
- Date of birth: August 20, 1993 (age 33)
- Place of birth: Shorewood, Wisconsin, U.S.
- Height: 5 ft 8 in (1.73 m)
- Position: Midfielder

Youth career
- 2008–2009: Shorewood High School
- 2009: FC Milwaukee

College career
Years	Team	Apps	(Gls)
2011–2014	Marquette Golden Eagles	85	(21)

Senior career*
Years	Team	Apps	(Gls)
2015–2017	Chicago Red Stars	4	(0)
- * Club domestic league appearances and goals as of October 23, 2017

Mary Bridget Luba (born August 20, 1993) is an American professional soccer midfielder who played for Chicago Red Stars in NWSL. She is a graduate of engineering from Marquette University and played collegiate soccer for Marquette Golden Eagles.

== Early life ==
Raised in Shorewood, Wisconsin with three older siblings, Luba attended Shorewood High School. Luba is afraid of heights and likes kites.

=== Marquette University ===
Luba attended Marquette University where she majored in engineering and played for the Golden Eagles in Big East Conference. In 2013, Luba was named to several Big East honorary teams including the Big East All-Academic Team; All-BIG EAST Second Team; NSCAA Women's NCAA Division I All-Northeast Region Third Team; NSCAA Scholar All-North/Central Region First Team; Big East All-Tournament team; and was also named Outstanding Offensive Player of the Big East Tournament. In 2014, Luba was named to All-Big East First Team, as well as to NSCAA NCAA Division I Women's All-Northeast Region second team.

== Playing career ==
=== Club ===
In 2015, Luba was eligible for National Women's Soccer League college draft. She played for the Chicago Red Stars during the preseason in 2015.

During the regular season while several team members of Chicago Red Stars were away representing United States women's national soccer team at 2015 FIFA Women's World Cup Luba made her debut in National Women's Soccer League. Luba also played for the Chicago Red Stars Reserves team and won the Women's Premier Soccer League national championship in July 2015. On September 2, 2015, Chicago Red Stars announced the signing of Mary Luba for the remainder of 2015 Chicago Red Stars season, just one game before the end of regular season.

In October 2017, Chicago Red Stars waived Luba to make room for Yūki Nagasato on the roster.

== International ==
In July 2014, Luba was invited to the training camp of United States under-23 women's national soccer team by coach Steve Swanson.
