= Rachel Tejada =

American soccer player (born 1993)

Personal information
- Full name: Rachel Lynne Tejada
- Date of birth: July 8, 1993 (age 33)
- Place of birth: Troy, Illinois, United States
- Height: 5 ft 6 in (1.68 m)
- Position: Striker

College career
Years	Team	Apps	(Gls)
2011–2014	Illinois State Redbirds		

Senior career*
Years	Team	Apps	(Gls)
2015	Chicago Red Stars	2	(0)
- * Club domestic league appearances and goals

Rachel Lynne Tejada (born July 8, 1993) is an American soccer player who last played as a striker for Chicago Red Stars of the National Women's Soccer League (NWSL).

== Club career ==
Chicago Red Stars drafted Tejada in 2015.
