= Stephanie McCaffrey =

American soccer player (born 1993)

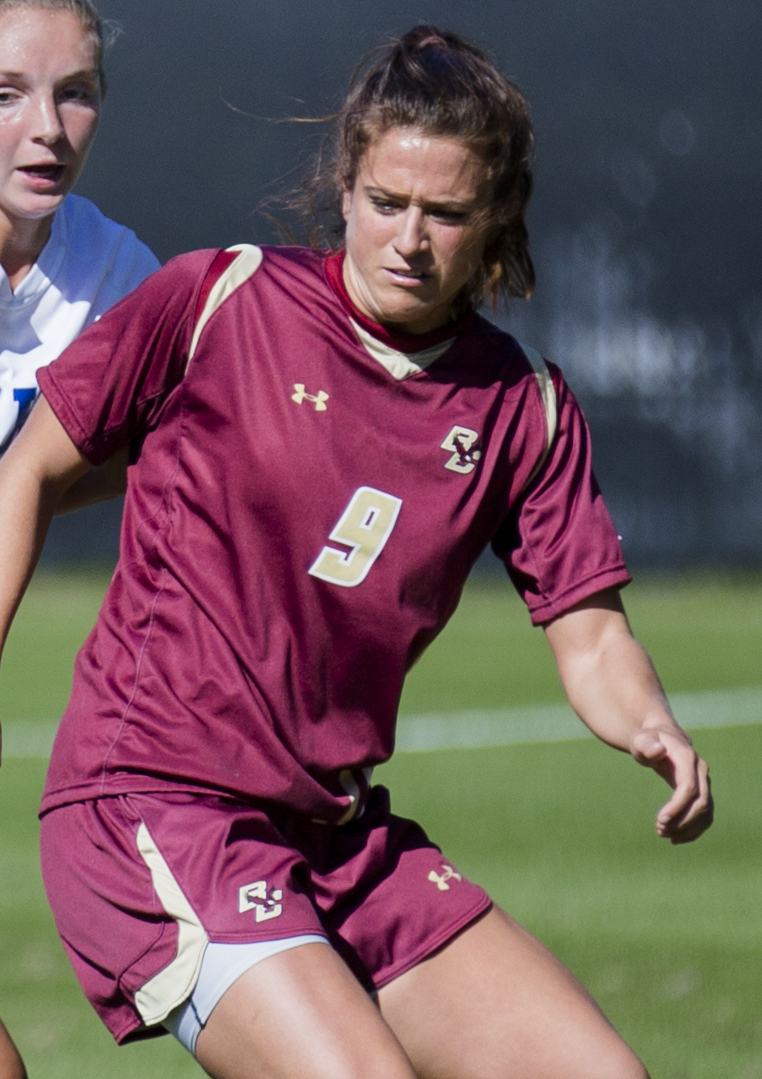
- McCaffrey in 2014

Personal information
- Full name: Stephanie Ann McCaffrey
- Date of birth: February 18, 1993 (age 33)
- Place of birth: Boston, Massachusetts, U.S.
- Height: 5 ft 6 in (1.68 m)
- Position: Forward

Team information
- Current team: Leyton Orient

College career
Years	Team	Apps	(Gls)
2011–2014	Boston College Eagles	76	(28)

Senior career*
Years	Team	Apps	(Gls)
2015–2016	Boston Breakers	31	(3)
2016–2018	Chicago Red Stars	20	(2)

International career
2014–2015	United States U23		
2015–2016	United States	6	(1)
- * Club domestic league appearances and goals

Stephanie Ann McCaffrey (born February 18, 1993) is an American former soccer player who played as a forward. During her career, she made six appearances for the United States women's national team. She currently plays for Leyton Orient.

== Early career ==
McCaffrey attended Buckingham Browne & Nichols where she played for the soccer team. In 2008 and 2010, she was named the Independent School League Most Valuable Player and Boston Globe All-Scholastic. After missing the 2009 season due to an injury, in 2010 she led the school to the league championship and broke the league's single-season scoring record with 38 goals (and 7 assists). McCaffrey played club soccer for the FC Stars and in 2010 led the team to clinch the Massachusetts state championship and a spot in the national finals.

== College career: Boston College Eagles (2011–2014) ==
McCaffrey attended Boston College and played for the Eagles from 2011 to 2014 in the Atlantic Coast Conference (ACC). During her freshman season, she played in every game for a total of 776 minutes and scored her first goal while leading the Eagles to a 1–0 win over Rutgers. During her sophomore season, she started in 20 of the 21 games she played and was ranked second on the team for goals scored with 10 including three game-winning goals. She served seven assists, ending the season with 27 points. On October 23, 2012, she was named ACC Co-Player of the Week, along with Caroline Miller of the University of Virginia, for being directly involved in two of Boston's three goals during the week, which included a 3–2 upset of the number one and undefeated Florida State University. However, her season ended when the Eagles lost in the second round of the NCAA tournament to Penn State 5-2, a game which she was benched due to inappropriate comments she posted on social media.

As a junior, McCaffrey started in all 24 games. Her 12 goals ranked second on the team in scoring and her nine assists ranked first. She tied the team's record for points scored in a single game with eight (two goals, four assists) during a match against Hofstra University on September 1, 2013. McCaffrey was named to the All-ACC Academic Team and received the Athletic Director's Award for Academic Achievement. As a senior in 2014, she co-captained the team and finished the season as the second-leading scorer on the team with six goals. Her seven assists ranked first on the team. McCaffrey finished her collegiate career with 32 goals, ranking fifth in the history of the team. She was also twice named to the All-Atlantic Coast Conference First Team.

== Club career ==
=== Boston Breakers (2015–2016) ===
McCaffrey was selected fifth overall by the Chicago Red Stars of the 2015 NWSL College Draft and was traded to the Boston Breakers during the second round. In her rookie season McCaffrey started 17 games and scored 3 goals. She returned to the club in 2016 and she appeared in 12 games before she was traded to the Chicago Red Stars.

=== Chicago Red Stars (2016–2018) ===
McCaffrey was traded to the Chicago Red Stars on July 22, 2016, in exchange for four draft picks in the 2017 NWSL College Draft and an international roster spot. She made her first appearance for the Red Stars on July 23 against the Houston Dash as a substitute in the 85th minute. McCaffrey scored 2 goals in 2016, helping the Red Stars qualify for the 2016 NWSL Playoffs. Due to a neurological illness McCaffrey only played in 2 games for the Red Stars in 2018.

On March 3, 2019, McCaffrey announced that she would be unable to continue playing professional soccer due to her illness.

== International career ==
McCaffrey represented the United States on the United States under-23 national team from 2014 to 2015. In February 2015, she played with the team at the La Manga Tournament. In January 2015, she was called up to train with the senior national team. She earned her first senior cap against Brazil on October 25, 2015, and also scored her first international goal in her first cap.

McCaffrey was named to the 20-player roster for the 2016 CONCACAF Women's Olympic Qualifying Championship. The United States qualified for the 2016 Summer Olympics, but McCaffrey wasn't named to the Olympic Team.

== Personal life ==
McCaffrey was born on February 18, 1993, in Boston to Gina and Jim McCaffrey, though she was raised in Winchester, Massachusetts. Her father was a sixth round selection of the Phoenix Suns in the 1986 NBA draft, her mother ran track, and two of her brothers played Division 1 college football.

McCaffrey is openly gay and in December 2024, she married artist Erin Robertson.

== Career statistics ==
=== International goals ===
Key (expand for notes on "international goals" and sorting)
Location	Geographic location of the venue where the competition occurred Sorted by country name first, then by city name
Lineup	Start – played entire match on minute (off player) – substituted on at the minute indicated, and player was substituted off at the same time off minute (on player) – substituted off at the minute indicated, and player was substituted on at the same time (c) – captain Sorted by minutes played
#	NumberOfGoals.goalNumber scored by the player in the match (alternate notation to Goal in match)
Min	The minute in the match the goal was scored. For list that include caps, blank indicates played in the match but did not score a goal.
Assist/pass	The ball was passed by the player, which assisted in scoring the goal. This column depends on the availability and source of this information.
penalty or pk	Goal scored on penalty-kick which was awarded due to foul by opponent. (Goals scored in penalty-shoot-out, at the end of a tied match after extra-time, are not included.)
Score	The match score after the goal was scored. Sorted by goal difference, then by goal scored by the player's team
Result	The final score. Sorted by goal difference in the match, then by goal difference in penalty-shoot-out if it is taken, followed by goal scored by the player's team in the match, then by goal scored in the penalty-shoot-out. For matches with identical final scores, match ending in extra-time without penalty-shoot-out is a tougher match, therefore precede matches that ended in regulation
aet	The score at the end of extra-time; the match was tied at the end of 90' regulation
pso	Penalty-shoot-out score shown in parentheses; the match was tied at the end of extra-time
	Green background color – exhibition or closed door international friendly match
NOTE: some keys may not apply for a particular football player

	Date	Location	Opponent	Lineup	#	Min	Assist/pass	Score	Result	Competition
1	2015-10-25 (Note: "U.S. WNT Downs Brazil 3–1 in Front of Record-Crowd in Orlando as Lauren HOliday and Lori Chalupny Play Final International Games". US Soccer. October 25, 2015.)	Orlando	Brazil	on 46' (off Heath)	1.1	90+4	Megan Rapinoe	3–1	3–1	Friendly

== Honors ==
=== International ===
- CONCACAF Women's Olympic Qualifying Tournament: 2016
