= Michelle Lomnicki =

American soccer player (born 1987)

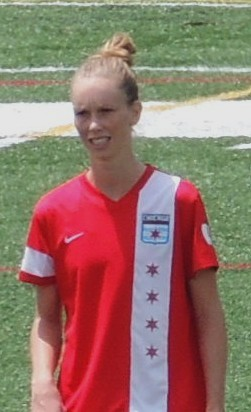
- Wenino with the Chicago Red Stars in 2013

Personal information
- Full name: Michelle Lynn Lomnicki
- Birth name: Michelle Lynn Wenino
- Date of birth: May 3, 1987 (age 39)
- Place of birth: Aurora, Colorado, United States
- Height: 5 ft 8 in (1.73 m)
- Position: Defender

College career
Years	Team	Apps	(Gls)
2005–2008	Colorado Buffaloes		

Senior career*
Years	Team	Apps	(Gls)
2009	Chicago Red Stars	1	(0)
2010	SC Freiburg	8	(1)
2010	Pali Blues	5	(0)
2011–2012	Sky Blue FC	3	(1)
2013–2015	Chicago Red Stars	40	(3)
Total		57	(5)
- * Club domestic league appearances and goals

Michelle Lynn Lomnicki (née Wenino; born May 3, 1987) is an American former professional soccer player who played as a defender.

== Early life ==
Born in Aurora, Colorado, to parents Pat and Sherri Wenino, Michelle attended Smoky Hill High School and played all four seasons for the girls soccer team. A four-sport, and 15-time letterwinner, she received the school's Athlete of the Year with Honors award in 2005. Wenino was a Tulsa All-Tournament team member in 2004 and received the Fair Play Award in 2000 State Cup play. She was first-team Centennial league as a senior and second-team as a junior and was named MVP for Smoky Hill as a senior. In 2003, the team were the 2003 Centennial League Champions. Wenino also ran track (200-800m distances) and cross country as a member of the 2002, 2003 and 2004 5A state championship teams that finished second at nationals in 2004 in Portland, Oregon. She was also a point guard on the school's basketball team that won the 2002 Centennial League Championship.

== Club career ==
=== Chicago Red Stars (WPS), 2009 ===
In 2009, Wenino played for Chicago Red Stars in the WPS during its inaugural season. She made one appearance during a game against Saint Louis Athletica at Toyota Park for a total of 34 minutes played.

=== SC Freiburg, 2010 ===
In 2010, Wenino played for SC Freiburg. She played seven games with five starts for a total of 476 minutes, scoring one goal.

=== Sky Blue FC, 2011 ===
In January 2011, Wenino signed with Sky Blue FC. She made three appearances and scored one goal.

=== Chicago Red Stars (NWSL), 2013–2015 ===
In February 2013, Wenino joined Chicago Red Stars in the National Women's Soccer League. Wenino started 17 games and appeared in 18 games in the 22-game season, usually playing defender on the right wing. She scored one goal and had one assist.

She announced her retirement on March 1, 2016.

== Post playing ==
Lomnicki returned to the Chicago Red Stars in 2020 as the Director of Camps and Clinics. In January 2022 she was named associate general manager of the Red Stars, and in January 2023 the Red Stars promoted her to general manager.

On May 5, 2023, the Red Stars announced that the team had fired Lomnicki on May 4 due to a "lapse in judgment to not share important information with club leadership". The "lapse of judgement" was not informing the Chicago Red Stars' club leadership that the suburban youth club, Chicago Empire FC, hired Craig Harrington while he was serving a two year ban from the NWSL (with eligibility for future employment being conditional). This was an issue for the Red Stars—who were already embroiled in scandal—because Lomnicki's husband is the youth club's sporting director and Lomnicki herself was listed as a female technical and performance consultant until around the time the story of Harrington's hiring started to break.

Lomnicki gave a statement on the matter which read, “I have ceased all youth contracting or club coaching as of January 2023, when I was hired as the (Red Stars’) general manager. My performance consultant role with Chicago Empire involved being a reference for girls in the club as they dealt with items such as competitive anxiety or college recruiting. I had no role in any hiring decisions for the club.”
