= Cara Walls =

American soccer player

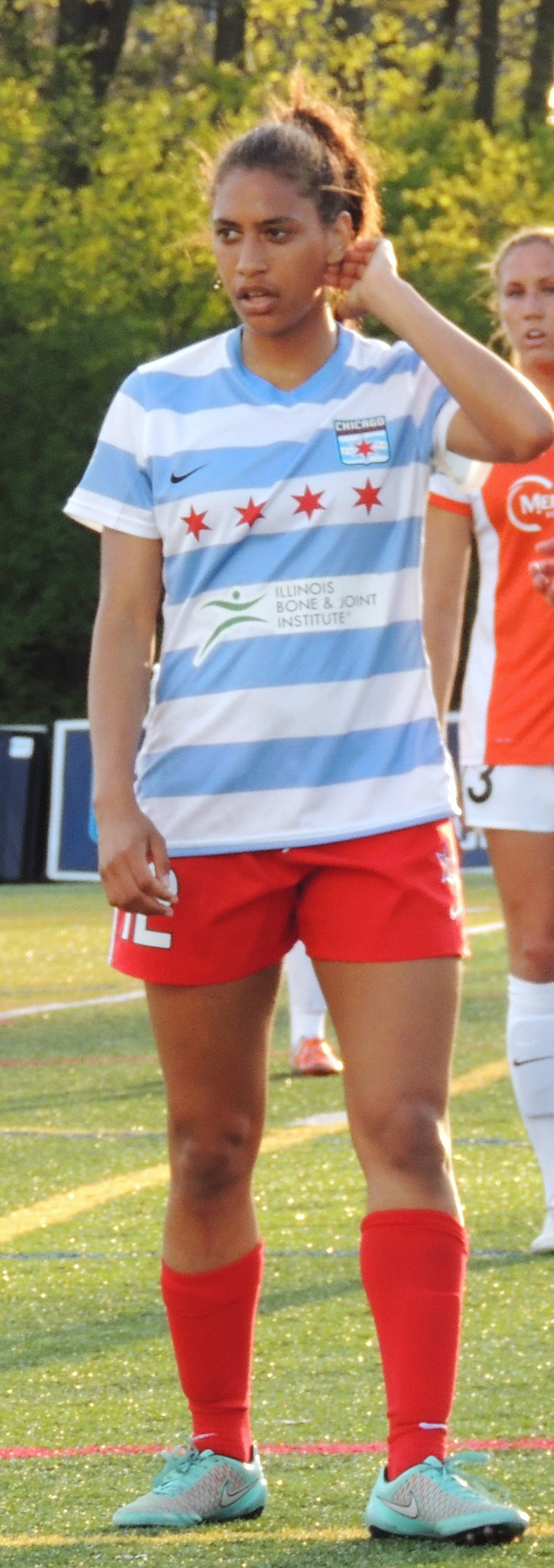
- Cara Walls playing for Red Stars against Sky Blue on May 2, 2015

Personal information
- Full name: Cara Katherine Walls
- Date of birth: June 16, 1993 (age 33)
- Place of birth: Wauwatosa, Wisconsin, United States
- Height: 5 ft 9 in (1.75 m)
- Position: Forward

Youth career
- FC Milwaukee Nationals

College career
Years	Team	Apps	(Gls)
2011–2014	Wisconsin Badgers		

Senior career*
Years	Team	Apps	(Gls)
2015–2016	Chicago Red Stars	23	(2)
- * Club domestic league appearances and goals

Cara Katherine Walls (born June 16, 1993) is an American professional soccer player, from Wauwatosa, Wisconsin, who previously played forward for the Chicago Red Stars.

== High school ==
Cara Walls attended Wauwatosa East High School. She led FC Milwaukee under-18 team to win the national championships, and as the top scorer was winner of the golden ball. Walls helped FC Milwaukee Nationals club win the state title. She was also a member of the high school honor roll.

== University of Wisconsin ==
Cara Walls played for the Wisconsin Badgers between 2011 and 2014. During her freshman year she was named Player of the Week 3 times. In 2012, Walls was named the Badgers' Offensive Player of the Year. In her senior year, Walls was named to All Big-Ten First Team, as well as Big-Ten All-Tournament Team. Cara Walls is the Badgers' second all time goal scorer with 42 goals, and holds the record of 10 multi-goal games.

Walls was inducted into the University of Wisconsin Athletic Hall of Fame in September 2025, becoming only the fourth player in program history to earn enshrinement.

== Club career ==
Walls was drafted by Chicago Red Stars as the 23rd overall pick in the 2015 NWSL College Draft. On April 16, 2015 Chicago Red Stars announced the signing of Cara Walls for 2015 National Women's Soccer League season. On April 9, 2015, Cara Walls scored her first professional goal in a 3–0 win against Boston Breakers to place the Red Stars at the top of the NWSL league.

Walls was waived by the Red Stars ahead of the 2017 season.

== Personal ==
Cara Walls' parents are Sarah Gingrass and Andre Walls. She has two sisters, Vinessa and Alayah, and a brother, Tony who is also a professional soccer player.
