= List of Chicago Stars FC players =

Chicago Red Stars is an American professional women's soccer club which began play in the Women's Professional Soccer (WPS) league'sinaugural season in 2009. All Red Stars players who have made 10 or more appearances for the team in official competitions are listed below. League appearances, goals and assists comprise those in WPS, Women's Premier Soccer League (WPSL), Women's Premier Soccer League Elite (WPSL-E), and the National Women's Soccer League (NWSL).

== Key ==
- The list is ordered alphabetically by last name.
- Appearances as a substitute are included.
- Statistics are correct as of October 26, 2017, the end of the 2017 NWSL season, and should be updated once a year only after the conclusion of the NWSL season.
- Players whose names are highlighted in **bold** were active players on the Red Stars roster as of the list's most recent update.

Positions key
GK	Goalkeeper
DF	Defender
MF	Midfielder
FW	Forward

Nationality
Unless otherwise noted, the nationality of a player is determined by the country they most recently represented in international play, or if said player has not played international football then by their country of birth.
Position
Playing positions are listed according to the player's roster designation as of the list's most recent update.
Red Stars career
Red Stars career is defined as the first and last calendar years in which the player was rostered for the club in any of the competitions listed below.
Appearances
This list counts appearances only in official league competitions, including the WPS regular season and playoffs, WPSL and WPSL-E regular season and playoffs, NWSL regular season, playoffs, Challenge Cup, and Fall Series.

== Players with 10 or more appearances ==
Player				Statistics		
Name	Nat.	Pos.	Red Stars career	App.	G	A
Danesha Adams	(United States) USA	MF	2009	12	0	0
Elise Addis	(United States) USA	DF	2010–2012	24	0	0
Kosovare Asllani	(Sweden) SWE	FW	2010	13	2	0
Jen Buczkowski	(United States) USA	MF	2012	11	0	0
Shannon Boxx	(United States) USA	MF	2013–2015	11	0	0
Morgan Brian	(United States) USA	MF	2017–	12	0	0
Zakiya Bywaters	(United States) USA	FW	2013–2015	25	4	0
Karen Carney	(England) ENG	FW	2009–2010	38	3	4
Lori Chalupny	(United States) USA	MF	2012–2015	62	16	11
Katie Chapman	(England) ENG	MF	2010	21	0	1
Amanda Cinalli	(United States) USA	FW	2011–2012	16	11	4
Danielle Colaprico	(United States) USA	MF	2015–2022;	63	3	3
Taylor Comeau	(United States) USA	MF	2016–	36	1	2
Cristiane	(Brazil) BRA	FW	2009–2010	42	10	2
Amanda Da Costa	(Portugal) POR	MF	2016	13	0	0
Marian Dalmy	(United States) USA	DF	2009–2010	40	1	6
Michele Dalton	(United States) USA	GK	2015–	21	0	0
Vanessa DiBernardo	(United States) USA	MF	2011–2012; 2014—	99	10	22
Ifeoma Dieke	(Scotland) SCO	DF	2009–2010	19	0	0
Maribel Domínguez	(Mexico) MEX	FW	2013	16	2	0
Whitney Engen	(United States) USA	DF	2010	24	0	0
Abby Erceg	(New Zealand) NZL	DF	2014–2015	25	0	0
Julie Ertz	(United States) USA	DF	2014–	66	6	7
Julie Ewing	(United States) USA	MF	2011	11	5	2
Jamie Forbes	(United States) USA	GK	2011–2013	22	0	0
Formiga	(Brazil) BRA	MF	2010	23	0	0
Lauren Fowlkes	(United States) USA	DF	2012–2013	15	6	2
Sonja Fuss	(Germany) GER	DF	2013	16	2	1
Arin Gilliland	(United States) USA	DF	2015–	61	0	4
Inka Grings	(Germany) GER	FW	2013	16	3	1
Jen Hoy	(United States) USA	FW	2013–	76	15	10
Sofia Huerta	(United States) USA	FW	2015–	63	19	9
Chioma Igwe	(United States) USA	MF	2009	15	0	0
Taryn Hemmings	(United States) USA	DF	2013–2015	47	1	4
Leigh Jakes	(United States) USA	MF	2010; 2015	11	0	0
Samantha Johnson	(United States) USA	DF	2014–	67	0	1
Caroline Jönsson	(Sweden) SWE	GK	2009	20	0	0
Kara Kabellis	(United States) USA	MF	2011–2012	12	4	4
Brittany Klein	(United States) USA	MF	2009–2010	23	1	3
Nikki Krzysik	(United States) USA	MF	2009	14	0	0
Karina LeBlanc	(Canada) CAN	GK	2014–2015	29	0	0
Adriana Leon	(Canada) CAN	MF	2013–2015	35	3	4
Carli Lloyd	(United States) USA	MF	2009	16	2	1
Michelle Lomnicki	(United States) USA	DF	2009; 2012–2015	60	3	3
Jillian Loyden	(United States) USA	GK	2010	23	0	0
Casey Loyd	(United States) USA	FW	2010	24	3	4
Kate Markgraf	(United States) USA	DF	2010	21	0	0
Ella Masar	(United States) USA	FW	2009–2010; 2013	58	11	4
Alyssa Mautz	(United States) USA	MF	2012–	105	14	6
Stephanie McCaffrey	(United States) USA	FW	2016–	30	2	0
Jessica McDonald	(United States) USA	FW	2010; 2013	14	0	1
Shannon McDonnell	(Republic of Ireland) IRL	DF	2011	11	1	0
Erin McLeod	(Canada) CAN	GK	2013	16	0	0
Kecia Morway	(United States) USA	DF	2011–2012; 2014	22	0	1
Shayla Mutz	(United States) USA	MF	2011–2012	16	3	0
Alyssa Naeher	(United States) USA	GK	2016–	35	0	0
Jill Oakes	(United States) USA	MF	2009	15	0	0
Leslie Osborne	(United States) USA	MF	2013	18	1	0
Frida Östberg	(Sweden) SWE	MF	2009	17	0	0
Christen Press	(United States) USA	FW	2014–	60	35	6
Morgan Proffitt	(United States) USA	MF	2017	10	0	0
Rachel Quon	(Canada) CAN	DF	2013–2015	55	0	1
Megan Rapinoe	(United States) USA	FW	2009–2010	36	3	5
Carly Samp	(United States) USA	MF	2011	11	1	1
Jackie Santacaterina	(United States) USA	DF	2010–2014	46	4	1
Sammy Scofield	(United States) USA	DF	2011–2012	21	1	0
Casey Krueger	(United States) USA	DF	2014; 2016–	42	3	1
Julianne Sitch	(United States) USA	DF	2010; 2012–2014	53	5	5
Natalie Spilger	(United States) USA	DF	2009–2010	36	0	1
Melissa Tancredi	(Canada) CAN	FW	2014–2015	21	5	1
Lindsay Tarpley	(United States) USA	FW	2009	17	4	4
Taylor Vancil	(United States) USA	GK	2011; 2013–2014	10	0	0
Emily van Egmond	(Australia) AUS	FW	2014	10	2	2
Lydia Vandenbergh	(United States) USA	FW	2009–2010; 2013	30	0	2
Cara Walls	(United States) USA	FW	2015–2016	22	2	1
Michele Weissenhofer	(United States) USA	FW	2011–2012; 2014	21	14	10

== See also ==
- List of top-division football clubs in CONCACAF countries
- List of professional sports teams in the United States and Canada
