= 2013 Chicago Red Stars season =

Chicago Red Stars
2013 season
- Owner: Arnim Whisler
- Head coach: Rory Dames
- Stadium: Village of Lisle-Benedictine University Sports Complex (capacity: 3,600)
- NWSL: 6th
- Top goalscorer: League: Lori Chalupny (5); All: Lori Chalupny (5)
- Highest home attendance: 3,400 vs. Seattle Reign FC (3 August 2013)
- Lowest home attendance: 790 vs. Western New York Flash (19 June 2013)
- Average home league attendance: 1,711
Home colors	Away colors	Third colors

The 2013 Chicago Red Stars season was the fifth season of the soccer club and its first season in National Women's Soccer League.

== Major events ==
In November 2012, it was announced that there would be eight teams in a new women's professional soccer league, the National Women's Soccer League will be subsidized by the USSF, the Canadian Soccer Association (CSA) and the Mexican Football Federation (FMF). The three federations would pay the salaries of their national team players (24 from the US, 16 from Canada, and 12 from Mexico) to aid the teams in creating world-class rosters while staying under the salary cap. The players would be distributed evenly (as possible) among the eight teams in an allocation process. USSF would run the league offices and set the schedule.

== Current squad ==
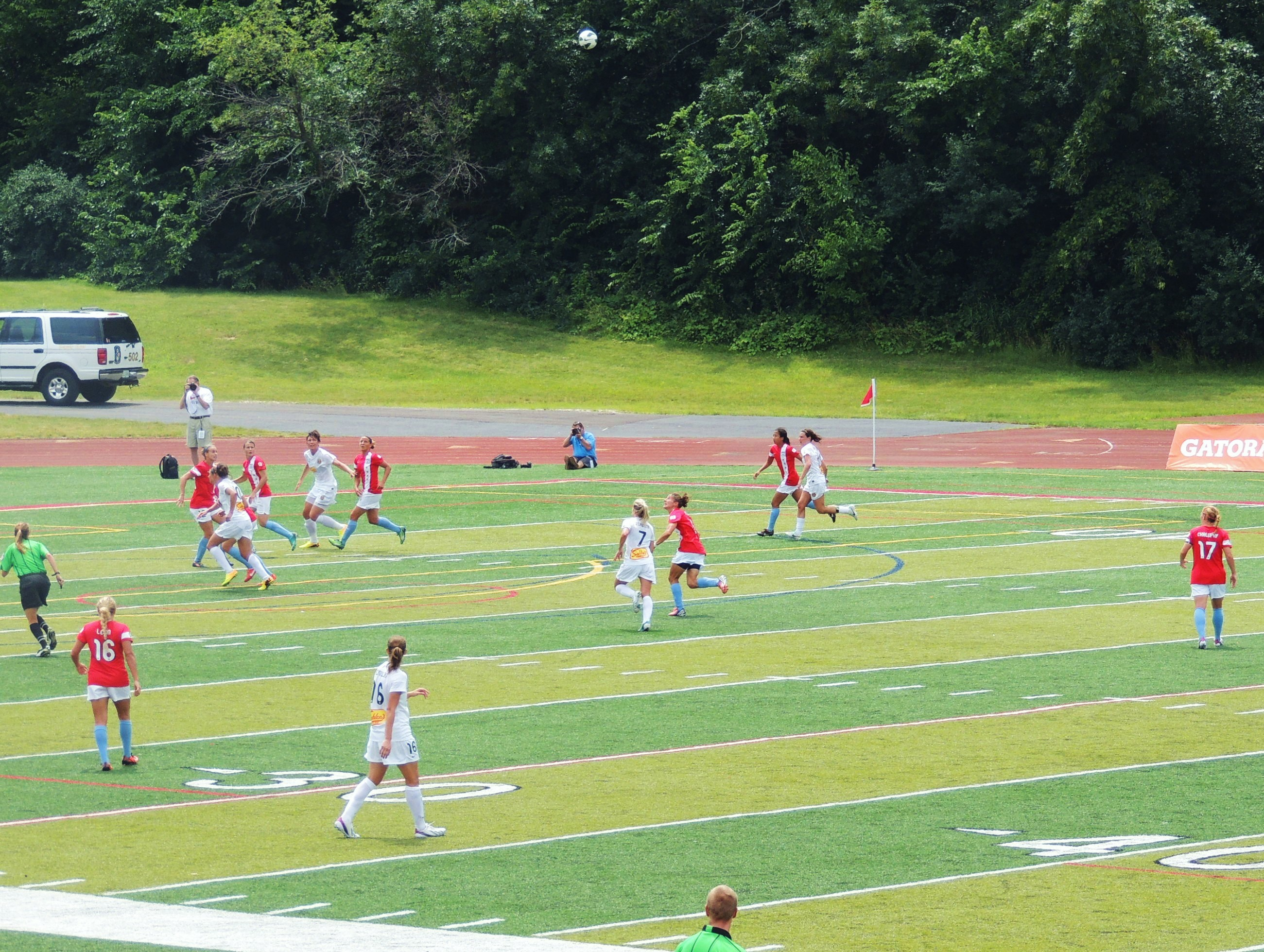
July 4, 2013; defending against Western New York Flash

=== First-team squad ===
Note: Flags indicate national team as defined under FIFA eligibility rules; some limited exceptions apply. Players may hold more than one non-FIFA nationality.

No.	Pos.	Nation	Player
1	GK	CAN	Erin McLeod
2	FW	USA	Jen Hoy
3	FW	USA	Ella Masar
4	MF	USA	Alyssa Mautz
6	FW	USA	Zakiya Bywaters
7	MF	USA	Shannon Boxx
9	FW	MEX	Maribel Dominguez
10	MF	MEX	Dinora Garza
11	DF	USA	Rachel Quon
12	MF	USA	Leslie Osborne

No.	Pos.	Nation	Player
13	DF	USA	Lydia Vandenbergh
14	DF	USA	Taryn Hemmings
16	FW	CAN	Adriana Leon
17	MF	USA	Lori Chalupny
18	DF	USA	Jackie Santacaterina
19	MF	USA	Julianne Sitch
20	GK	USA	Taylor Vancil
21	FW	GER	Inka Grings
22	MF	GER	Sonja Fuss
23	DF	USA	Michelle Wenino

Squad correct as of July 2, 2013

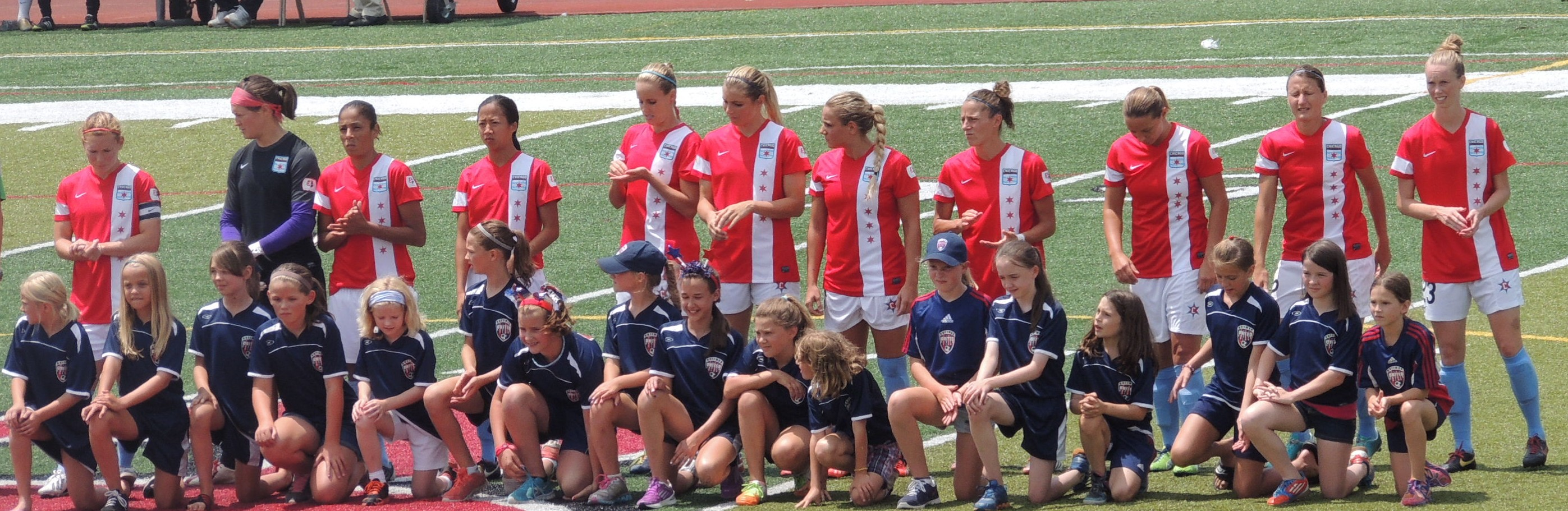
July 4, 2013; Chicago Red Stars vs Western New York Flash. Starting lineup, left to right: 17-Lori Chalupny (c), 1-Erin McLeod(GK), 9-Maribel Dominguez 11-Rachel Quon, 12-Leslie Osborne, 14-Taryn Hemmings, 16-Adriana Leon, 19-Julianne Sitch, 21-Inka Grings, 22-Sonja Fuss, 23-Michelle Wenino

=== Second-team squad/Injured ===
Note: Flags indicate national team as defined under FIFA eligibility rules; some limited exceptions apply. Players may hold more than one non-FIFA nationality.

No. / Pos. / Nation / Player; — / DF / USA / Amy LePeilbet	No. / Pos. / Nation / Player; — / FW / USA / Lindsay Tarpley

== Player movement ==
=== In ===
Per NWSL and club policies terms of the deals do not get disclosed.

Date	Player	Position	Previous club	Fee/notes	Ref
January 11, 2013	(United States) Shannon Boxx	MF	(United States) magicJack	Acquired in the NWSL Player Allocation	
January 11, 2013	(United States) Amy LePeilbet	DF	(United States) Boston Breakers	Acquired in the NWSL Player Allocation	
January 11, 2013	(United States) Keelin Winters	FW	(Germany) 1. FFC Turbine Potsdam	Acquired in the NWSL Player Allocation	
January 11, 2013	(Canada) Erin McLeod	GK	(Sweden) Dalsjöfors GoIF	Acquired in the NWSL Player Allocation	
January 11, 2013	(Canada) Carmelina Moscato	MF	(United States) Piteå IF	Acquired in the NWSL Player Allocation	
January 11, 2013	(Mexico) Maribel Dominguez	FW		Acquired in the NWSL Player Allocation	
January 11, 2013	(Mexico) Dinora Garza	MF		Acquired in the NWSL Player Allocation	
January 18, 2013	(United States) Zakiya Bywaters	FW	(United States) UCLA	Selected 1st overall in the 2013 NWSL College Draft	
January 18, 2013	(United States) Taylor Vancil	GK	(United States) Florida State	Selected 17th overall in the 2013 NWSL College Draft	
February 1, 2013	(United States) Leslie Osborne	MF	(United States) Boston Breakers	Signed as a free agent	
February 5, 2013	(United States) Lori Chalupny	MF	(United States) Chicago Red Stars	Signed as a free agent	
February 5, 2013	(United States) Taryn Hemmings	DF	(United States) Boston Breakers	Signed as a free agent	
February 5, 2013	(United States) Ella Masar	FW	(United States) Chicago Red Stars	Signed as a free agent	
February 7, 2013	(United States) Lindsay Tarpley	FW	(United States) magicJack	Selected 4th overall in the 2013 NWSL Supplemental Draft	
February 7, 2013	(United States) Lauren Fowlkes	DF	(United States) Chicago Red Stars	Selected 12th overall in the 2013 NWSL Supplemental Draft	
February 7, 2013	(United States) Michelle Wenino	DF	(United States) Chicago Red Stars	Selected 20th overall in the 2013 NWSL Supplemental Draft	
February 7, 2013	(United States) Jackie Santacaterina	DF	(United States) Chicago Red Stars	Selected 28th overall in the 2013 NWSL Supplemental Draft	
February 7, 2013	(United States) Alyssa Mautz	MF	(United States) Chicago Red Stars	Selected 36th overall in the 2013 NWSL Supplemental Draft	
February 7, 2013	(United States) Jessica McDonald	FW	(Australia) Melbourne Victory FC	Signed as a free agent	
March 18, 2013	(United States) Rachel Quon	DF	(United States) Stanford	Signed after being selected 9th overall (second round) in the 2013 NWSL College Draft	
March 18, 2013	(United States) Lydia Vandenbergh	DF	(United States) magicJack	Acquired as a discovery player selection	
March 21, 2013	(Germany) Sonja Fuss	MF	(Switzerland) FC Zürich	Acquired as a designated international player	
March 21, 2013	(Germany) Inka Grings	FW	(Switzerland) FC Zürich	Acquired as a designated international player	
April 8, 2013	(United States) Hanna Gilmore	FW	(United States) Baylor	Made final roster as a tryout draftee	
April 8, 2013	(United States) Julianne Sitch	MF	(United States) Chicago Red Stars	Made final roster as a tryout draftee	
May 30, 2013	(United States) Jamie Forbes	GK	(United States) Chicago Red Stars		
June 13, 2013	(United States) Jen Hoy	FW	(United States) Princeton	Signed after being selected 25th overall (fourth round) in the 2013 NWSL College Draft	
June 13, 2013	(United States) Kelsey Devonshire	GK	(United States) Chicago Red Stars		
June 30, 2013	(Canada) Adriana Leon	FW	(United States) Boston Breakers	Traded in exchange for Carmelina Moscato	

=== Out ===
Date	Player	Position	Destination club	Fee/notes	Ref
March 1, 2013	(United States) Keelin Winters	FW	(United States) Seattle Reign FC	Traded together with the 4th round pick in the 2014 NWSL College Draft in exchange for the 1st round pick in the 2014 NWSL College Draft and future considerations (part of the future considerations include Seattle's 2014 U.S. WNT Allocated player)	
May 30, 2013	(United States) Hanna Gilmore	FW	None	Waived	
May 30, 2013	(United States) Lauren Fowlkes	DF	None	Retired	
June 28, 2013	(United States) Jessica McDonald	FW	(United States) Seattle Reign FC	Waived; picked up off waivers by Seattle Reign FC	
June 30, 2013	(Canada) Carmelina Moscato	DF	(United States) Boston Breakers	Traded in exchange for Adriana Leon	

- Players not selected in either the 2013 NWSL Supplemental Draft or signed as a free agent, but were on the 2012 Red Star squad: defender Elise Weber, defender Lauren Alkek, midfielder Jennifer Buczkowski, forward Amanda Cinalli, goalkeeper Kelsey Devonshire, midfielder Vanessa DiBernardo, forward Allison Doyle, goalkeeper Kristin Eggert, midfielder Ashleigh Ellenwood, defender Ashlee Elliott, goalkeeper Jamie Forbes, defender Alexandra Heller, defender Brittany Hengesh, midfielder Kelsey Hough, forward Michele Weissenhofer, defender Kara Kabellis, midfielder Vanessa Laxgang, midfielder Nicole Lipp, defender Mary Therese McDonnell, defender Kecia Morway, midfielder Shayla Mutz, forward Lindsey Schwartz, defender Sammy Scofield.
- Invitees to the preseason camp who departed or were released in the preseason: midfielder Natalia Daniels, goalkeeper Erin Kane, midfielder Maureen Smunt, midfielder Alissa VonderHaar.

== Management and staff ==
Front Office
Coaching Staff

- Manager Rory Dames
- First Assistant Coach Stephanie Foster
- Second Assistant Coach Christian Lavers
- Goalkeeper Coach Trae Manny

== Regular-season standings ==
Pos	Team	Pld	W	D	L	GF	GA	GD	Pts	Qualification
1	Western New York Flash	22	10	8	4	36	20	+16	38	NWSL Shield
2	FC Kansas City	22	11	5	6	34	22	+12	38	NWSL Playoffs
3	Portland Thorns FC (C)	22	11	5	6	32	25	+7	38	NWSL Playoffs
4	Sky Blue FC	22	10	6	6	31	26	+5	36	NWSL Playoffs
5	Boston Breakers	22	8	6	8	35	34	+1	30	
6	Chicago Red Stars	22	8	6	8	32	36	−4	30	
7	Seattle Reign FC	22	5	3	14	22	36	−14	18	
8	Washington Spirit	22	3	5	14	16	39	−23	14	

Source: soccerway.com
Rules for classification: Tiebreakers
(C) Champions

=== Results summary ===
Overall								Home						Away					
Pld	Pts	W	L	T	GF	GA	GD	W	L	T	GF	GA	GD	W	L	T	GF	GA	GD
22	30	8	8	6	32	36	−4	4	3	4	15	16	−1	4	5	2	17	20	−3

Last updated: 18 August 2013
Source: NWSLsoccer.com standings
Pld = Matches played; Pts = Points; W = Matches won; T = Matches tied; L = Matches lost; GF = Goals for; GA = Goals against; GD = Goal difference

== Match results ==
Win Tie Loss

=== Preseason ===
24 March 2013	Marquette University	0–2	Chicago Red Stars	Milwaukee, Wisconsin
16:30 CDT (UTC−05)		Report	Mautz 27', 55'	Stadium: Valley Fields

27 March 2013	St. Edward's University	0–8	Chicago Red Stars	Austin, Texas
		Report	Osborne 29'; Chalupny 38', 56'; McDonald 60' (?), 66', 90+'; Gilmore 63'	Stadium: Lewis-Chen Family Field

30 March 2013	Houston Aces	1–2	Chicago Red Stars	Austin, Texas
16:00 CDT (UTC−05)	90'	Report	Chalupny 58', 63'	Stadium: Lewis-Chen Family Field

3 April 2013	Notre Dame	1–4	Chicago Red Stars	Notre Dame, Indiana
16:30 CDT (UTC−05)	Laddish 58'	Notre Dame Report; Red Stars Report	Fowlkes 18', 20'; Masar 57'; Bywaters 78'	Stadium: Alumni Stadium

7 April 2013	Chicago Red Stars	5–0	Illinois State University	Oak Brook, Illinois
17:00 CDT (UTC−05)	Fowlkes 7'; 17' (o.g.); Bywaters 61'; McDonald 78', 88'	Report		Stadium: Oak Brook Polo Grounds

=== National Women's Soccer League ===
14 April 2013	Chicago Red Stars	1–1	Seattle Reign FC	Lisle, Illinois
17:00 CDT (UTC−05)	Chalupny 19'	Report 1 Report 2	Nairn 10'	Stadium: Village of Lisle-Benedictine University Sports Complex; Attendance: 1,255

27 April 2013	Chicago Red Stars	0–2	Portland Thorns FC	Lisle, Illinois
19:00 CDT (UTC−05)		Report	Foxhoven 70'; Sinclair 81'	Stadium: Village of Lisle-Benedictine University Sports Complex; Attendance: 2,855; Referee: Katja Koroleva

4 May 2013	Boston Breakers	4–1	Chicago Red Stars	Somerville, Massachusetts
18:00 EDT (UTC−04)	Schoepfer 20'; Leroux 26', 74', 84'	Report	Bywaters 60'	Stadium: Dilboy Stadium; Attendance: 3,113; Referee: Kristen Schiereck

8 May 2013	Sky Blue FC	1–1	Chicago Red Stars	Piscataway, New Jersey
19:00 EDT (UTC−04)	Schmidt 88'	Report	Mautz 92+'	Stadium: Yurcak Field; Attendance: 688; Referee: Eugene Mednikov

12 May 2013	Chicago Red Stars	0–2	Portland Thorns FC	Lisle, Illinois
17:00 CDT (UTC−05)		Portland	Morgan 3'; Long 34'	Stadium: Village of Lisle-Benedictine University Sports Complex; Attendance: 1,329; Referee: Kari Seitz

24 May 2013	Western New York Flash	2–1	Chicago Red Stars	Rochester, New York
19:05 EDT (UTC−04)	Wambach 54'; Zerboni 65'	Report	Chalupny 52'	Stadium: Sahlen's Stadium; Attendance: 3,152; Referee: Robert Sibiga

1 June 2013	Portland Thorns FC	0–2	Chicago Red Stars	Portland, Oregon
14:00 PDT (UTC−07)		Report	Bywaters 34'; Santacaterina 61'	Stadium: Jeld-Wen Field; Attendance: 12,446; Referee: Christina Unkel

9 June 2013	Chicago Red Stars	1–0	Boston Breakers	Lisle, Illinois
15:00 CDT (UTC−05)	Chalupny 26'	Report		Stadium: Village of Lisle-Benedictine University Sports Complex; Attendance: 1,129; Referee: Kari Seitz

13 June 2013	Chicago Red Stars	0–2	FC Kansas City	Lisle, Illinois
18:30 CDT (UTC−05)		Report	Loyd 27' (pen.); Jones 66'	Stadium: Village of Lisle-Benedictine University Sports Complex; Attendance: 1,141; Referee: Josh Wilkens

16 June 2013	FC Kansas City	1–3	Chicago Red Stars	Overland Park, Kansas
15:10 CDT (UTC−05)	Cuellar 4'	Report	Grings 29'; Masar 58'; Fuss 91+' (pen.)	Stadium: Shawnee Mission District Stadium; Attendance: 3,421; Referee: Juliana Duncan

19 June 2013	Chicago Red Stars	2–2	Western New York Flash	Lisle, Illinois
18:30 CDT (UTC−05)	Mautz 1'; Osborne 40'	Report	Martin 12'; Taylor 89'	Stadium: Village of Lisle-Benedictine University Sports Complex; Attendance: 790; Referee: Kara Honthumb

29 June 2013	Seattle Reign FC	3–1	Chicago Red Stars	Tukwila, Washington
20:00 PDT (UTC−07)	Kyle 51' (pen.); Fishlock 58'; Rapinoe 93+'	Report	Wenino 85'	Stadium: Starfire Sports Stadium; Attendance: 2,318; Referee: Josh Wilkens

4 July 2013	Chicago Red Stars	1–0	Western New York Flash	Lisle, Illinois
13:00 CDT (UTC−05)	Chalupny 58'	Report		Stadium: Village of Lisle-Benedictine University Sports Complex; Attendance: 2,064; Referee: Juliana Duncan

10 July 2013	Washington Spirit	0–2	Chicago Red Stars	Boyds, Maryland
19:30 EDT (UTC−04)		Report	Leon 63'; Masar 71'	Stadium: Maryland SoccerPlex; Attendance: 2,593; Referee: Miguel Panduro

14 July 2013	Chicago Red Stars	3–3	FC Kansas City	Lisle, Illinois
15:00 CDT (UTC−05)	Dominguez 41'; Masar 90'; Chalupny 96+'	Report	Holiday 17'; Hemmings 43' (o.g.); Tymrak 87'	Stadium: Village of Lisle-Benedictine University Sports Complex; Attendance: 1,549; Referee: Josh Wilkens

20 July 2013	Chicago Red Stars	1–0	Washington Spirit	Lisle, Illinois
18:00 CDT (UTC−05)	McCarty 62' (o.g.)	Report		Stadium: Village of Lisle-Benedictine University Sports Complex; Attendance: 1,241; Referee: Margaret Domka

25 July 2013	Seattle Reign FC	4–1	Chicago Red Stars	Tukwila, Washington
19:00 PDT (UTC−07)	Rapinoe 6', 68'; Kyle 24' (pen.); Bogus 83'	Report	Hoy 74'	Stadium: Starfire Stadium; Attendance: 2,017; Referee: Robert Sibiga

28 July 2013	Portland Thorns FC	3–3	Chicago Red Stars	Portland, Oregon
16:00 PDT (UTC−07)	Sinclair 23', 63'; Shim 55'	Report	Mautz 60', 75'; Sitch 86'	Stadium: Jeld-Wen Field; Attendance: 12,534; Referee: Kari Seitz

3 August 2013	Chicago Red Stars	3–1	Seattle Reign FC	Lisle, Illinois
18:00 CDT (UTC−05)	Fuss 11' (pen.); Grings 41', 72'	Report	Kyle 11' (pen.)	Stadium: Village of Lisle-Benedictine University Sports Complex; Attendance: 3,400; Referee: Kara Honthumb

7 August 2013	Washington Spirit	1–0	Chicago Red Stars	Boyds, Maryland
19:30 EDT (UTC−04)	Worbis 58'	Report		Stadium: Maryland SoccerPlex; Attendance: 2,081; Referee: Dimitar Chavdarov

10 August 2013	Chicago Red Stars	3–3	Sky Blue FC	Lisle, Illinois
18:00 CDT (UTC−05)	Dominguez 8'; Santacaterina 77', 90'	Report	Ocampo 15', 89'; Schmidt 36'	Stadium: Village of Lisle-Benedictine University Sports Complex; Attendance: 2,064; Referee: Kristen Salazar

18 August 2013	FC Kansas City	1–2	Chicago Red Stars	Overland Park, Kansas
15:10 CDT (UTC−05)	Jones 20'	Report	Hoy 45', 92+'	Stadium: Shawnee Mission District Stadium; Attendance: 4,910; Referee: Elvis Mahmutovic

== Squad statistics ==
N	Player	GP	GS	Min	G	A	WG	Shot	SOG	Cros	CK	Off	Foul	FS	YC	RC
7	Shannon Boxx	2	1	123	0	0	0	2	1	2	0	0	3	0	0	0
6	Zakiya Bywaters	6	5	372	2	0	1	8	4	2	0	4	4	2	0	0
17	Lori Chalupny	18	17	1500	5	4	2	42	20	8	28	8	33	41	3	0
9	Maribel Dominguez	16	9	710	2	0	0	24	12	5	0	5	10	7	0	0
15	Lauren Fowlkes	4	4	291	0	0	0	1	0	0	0	2	6	7	0	0
22	Sonja Fuss	16	16	1440	2	1	0	6	2	11	0	0	8	2	0	0
10	Dinora Garza	2	2	93	0	0	0	1	0	0	0	0	1	1	0	0
21	Inka Grings	16	14	1295	3	1	1	30	13	2	0	13	15	12	2	0
14	Taryn Hemmings	14	14	1245	0	1	0	4	2	0	0	0	10	2	0	0
2	Jen Hoy	9	4	471	3	1	1	9	5	2	0	7	6	5	1	0
16	Adriana Leon	10	9	800	1	1	1	16	8	6	1	0	16	10	1	0
3	Ella Masar	20	14	1206	3	2	1	24	11	7	0	11	26	9	0	0
4	Alyssa Mautz	18	8	901	4	0	0	18	13	5	0	3	15	5	3	0
8	Jessica McDonald	9	3	323	0	1	0	3	2	4	0	0	6	0	0	0
5	Carmelina Moscato	5	4	363	0	0	0	1	0	0	0	1	1	0	1	0
12	Leslie Osborne	18	18	1550	1	0	0	7	4	0	1	1	20	11	2	0
11	Rachel Quon	19	16	1531	0	1	0	7	0	9	0	0	7	11	1	0
18	Jackie Santacaterina	18	14	1316	3	1	0	12	7	0	1	0	9	3	1	0
19	Julianne Sitch	20	18	1577	1	4	0	19	8	2	34	3	33	8	1	0
13	Lydia Vandenbergh	17	13	1195	0	2	0	1	1	8	23	0	8	12	1	0
23	Michelle Wenino	18	17	1478	1	1	0	8	2	3	0	0	16	6	2	0

N	Goal keeper	GP	GS	Min	W	L	T	Shot	SOG	Save	GA	GA/G	Pen	PKF	SO
1	Erin McLeod	16	16	1440	5	6	5	165	92	64	28	1.75	2	2	4
20	Taylor Vancil	6	6	540	3	2	1	64	31	23	8	1.333	2	2	1

=== Top scorers ===
Includes all competitive matches. The list is sorted by shirt number when total goals are equal.

Ran	No.	Pos	Nat	Name	National Women's Soccer League	Total
1	17	MF	(United States)	Lori Chalupny	5	5
2	4	MF	(United States)	Alyssa Mautz	4	4
3	2	FW	(United States)	Jen Hoy	3	3
3	3	FW	(United States)	Ella Masar	3	3
3	18	DF	(United States)	Jackie Santacaterina	3	3
3	21	FW	(Germany)	Inka Grings	3	3
4	6	MF	(United States)	Zakiya Bywaters	2	2
4	9	FW	(Mexico)	Maribel Dominguez	2	2
4	22	MF	(Germany)	Sonja Fuss	2	2
5	12	MF	(United States)	Leslie Osborne	1	1
5	16	FW	(Canada)	Adriana Leon	1 (Note: Before being traded to the Red Stars on June 30, Leon scored one goal for the Boston Breakers but is not counted here.)	1
5	19	MF	(United States)	Julianne Sitch	1	1
5	23	DF	(United States)	Michelle Wenino	1	1
				TOTALS	31	31

Updated to matches played on 18 August 2013
Source: Chicagoredstars.com Player Stats

=== Top assists ===
Includes all competitive matches. The list is sorted by shirt number when total assists are equal.

Ran	No.	Pos	Nat	Name	National Women's Soccer League	Total
1	17	MF	(United States)	Lori Chalupny	4	4
1	19	MF	(United States)	Julianne Sitch	4	4
2	3	FW	(United States)	Ella Masar	2	2
2	13	DF	(United States)	Lydia Vandenbergh	2	2
3	2	FW	(United States)	Jen Hoy	1	1
3	8	FW	(United States)	Jessica McDonald	1	1
3	11	DF	(United States)	Rachel Quon	1	1
3	14	DF	(United States)	Taryn Hemmings	1	1
3	16	FW	(Canada)	Adriana Leon	1	1
3	18	DF	(United States)	Jackie Santacaterina	1	1
3	21	FW	(Germany)	Inka Grings	1	1
3	22	MF	(Germany)	Sonja Fuss	1	1
3	23	DF	(United States)	Michelle Wenino	1	1
				TOTALS	21	21

== Awards ==
=== NWSL Player of the Week ===
Week	Player of the Week		Week's Statline
Week 10	(United States)	Lori Chalupny	1 A
Week 19	(United States)	Jen Hoy	2 G (45', 92')

=== NWSL Best XI ===
NWSL Best XI
Player	Position	Team	Note
(United States) Lori Chalupny	Midfield	Chicago Red Stars	5 goals, 4 assists
