= 2014 Chicago Red Stars season =

Chicago Red Stars
2014 season
- Owner: Arnim Whisler
- Head coach: Rory Dames
- Stadium: Village of Lisle-Benedictine University Sports Complex (capacity: 3,600)
- NWSL: 5th
- Highest home attendance: 15,743 vs Western New York Flash (19 April 2014 at Toyota Park)
- Average home league attendance: 2,949
Home colors	Away colors

The 2014 Chicago Red Stars season was the sixth season of the soccer club and its second season in National Women's Soccer League.

== First-team squad ==
Players that competed in 2014 NWSL season for Chicago Red Stars.

Note: Flags indicate national team as defined under FIFA eligibility rules; some limited exceptions apply. Players may hold more than one non-FIFA nationality.

No.	Pos.	Nation	Player
1	GK	CAN	Karina LeBlanc
2	FW	USA	Jen Hoy
3	DF	USA	Kecia Morway
4	MF	USA	Alyssa Mautz
5	FW	USA	Zakiya Bywaters
6	DF	NZL	Abby Erceg
7	MF	USA	Shannon Boxx
8	MF	USA	Julie Johnston
9	FW	CAN	Melissa Tancredi
10	MF	USA	Vanessa DiBernardo
11	DF	CAN	Rachel Quon
13	DF	USA	Michelle Wenino

No.	Pos.	Nation	Player
14	DF	USA	Taryn Hemmings
15	DF	AUS	Emily van Egmond
16	DF	USA	Samantha Johnson
17	MF	USA	Lori Chalupny
18	DF	USA	Jackie Santacaterina
19	FW	CAN	Adriana Leon
20	GK	USA	Taylor Vancil
21	FW	USA	Hayley Brock
23	FW	USA	Christen Press
24	FW	USA	Niki Read
28	FW	USA	Michele Weissenhofer
38	MF	USA	Julianne Sitch

Squad correct as of August 31, 2014

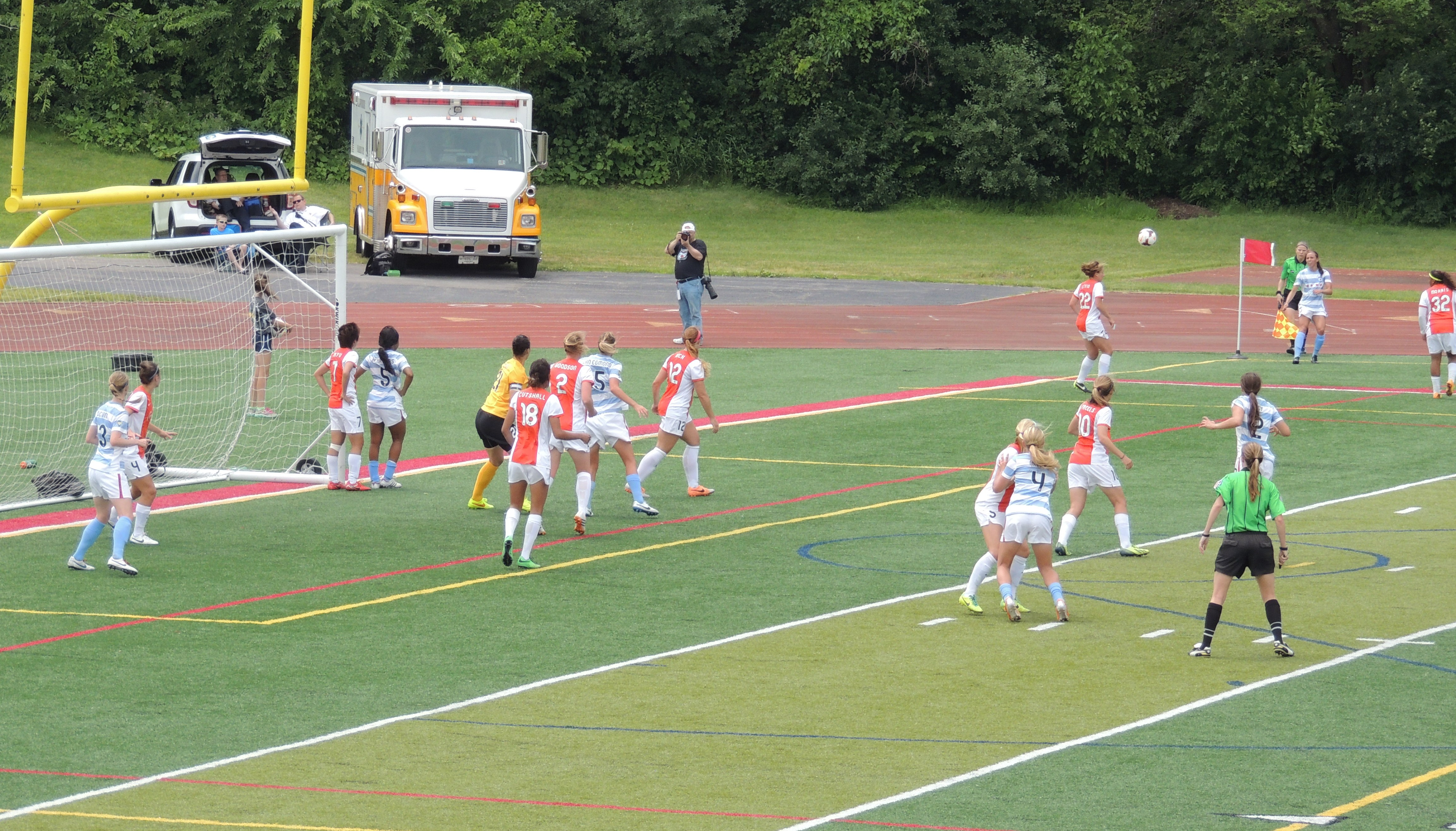
June 15, 2014 Sky Blue FC at Chicago Red Stars, DiBernardo serving a corner-kick to Loyden's goal. From left to right: 3-Morway 4-Foord 7-Kiryu 5-Bywaters 21-Loyden 18-Cutshall 2-Goodson 15-Egmond 12-Nick 5-K Johnson 4-Mautz 10-Freels 22-Levin 2-Hoy 10-DiBernardo 32-Morris

== Player movement ==
Joined in previous season During preseason During regular season

Note: Game day roster (GDR) are from regular season only

N	Pos	Player	Date	Trans	GDR	Method	Club
5	FW	Zakiya Bywaters	Jan 18, 2013	in	Apr 26, 2014	2013 College Draft	UCLA Bruins
2	FW	Jen Hoy	Jan 18, 2013	in	Apr 19, 2014	2013 College Draft	Princeton Tigers
20	GK	Taylor Vancil	Jan 18, 2013	in	Apr 19, 2014	2013 College Draft	Florida State Seminoles
17	MF	Lori Chalupny	Feb 5, 2013	in	Apr 19, 2014	Signed	Hammarby IF
––	MF	Ella Masar	Feb 5, 2013	in	––	Signed	Paris Saint-Germain
14	DF	Taryn Hemmings	Feb 5, 2013	in	May 18, 2014	Signed	Canberra United
4	MF	Alyssa Mautz	Feb 7, 2013	in	Apr 19, 2014	2013 Supplemental draft	Chicago Red Stars
18	DF	Jackie Santacaterina	Feb 7, 2013	in	Apr 19, 2014	2013 Supplemental draft	Chicago Red Stars
13	DF	Michelle Wenino	Feb 7, 2013	in	Apr 19, 2014	2013 Supplemental draft	Sky Blue FC
38	MF	Julianne Sitch	2013	in	Apr 19, 2014	Signed	Hammarby IF
19	FW	Adriana Leon	Jan 3, 2014	in	Apr 19, 2014	Player allocation	Chicago Red Stars
––	DF	Amy LePeilbet	Jan 3, 2014	in	––	Player allocation	Chicago Red Stars
––	GK	Erin McLeod	Jan 3, 2014	in	––	Player allocation	Chicago Red Stars
11	DF	Rachel Quon	Jan 3, 2014	in	Apr 19, 2014	Player allocation	Chicago Red Stars
7	MF	Shannon Boxx	Jan 3, 2014	in	Jul 9, 2014	Player allocation	Chicago Red Stars
23	FW	Christen Press	Jan 3, 2014	in	Jun 7, 2014	Player allocation	Tyresö FF
––	GK	Erin McLeod	Jan 7, 2014	out	––	Trade	Houston Dash
9	FW	Melissa Tancredi	Jan 7, 2014	in	Jun 7, 2014	Trade	Houston Dash
––	MF	Ella Masar	Jan 10, 2014	out	––	Expansion Draft	Houston Dash
1	GK	Karina LeBlanc	Jan 13, 2014	in	Apr 19, 2014	Trade	Portland Thorns FC
21	FW	Hayley Brock	Jan 17, 2014	in	Apr 19, 2014	2014 College Draft	Maryland Terrapins
8	DF	Julie Johnston	Jan 17, 2014	in	Apr 19, 2014	2014 College Draft	Santa Clara Broncos
10	MF	Vanessa DiBernardo	Jan 17, 2014	in	Apr 19, 2014	2014 College Draft	Illinois Fighting Illini
28	FW	Michele Weissenhofer	2014	in	Jun 18, 2014		Portland Thorns FC
16	DF	Samantha Johnson	2014	in	Apr 19, 2014		USC Trojans
––	DF	Amy LePeilbet	Mar 31, 2014	out	––	Trade	FC Kansas City
3	DF	Kecia Morway	Apr 1, 2014	in	Apr 19, 2014	Signed	Chicago Eclipse Select
24	FW	Niki Read	Apr 22, 2014	in	Apr 26, 2014	Signed	Illinois Fighting Illini
6	DF	Abby Erceg	May 5, 2014	in	Jun 7, 2014	Signed	FF USV Jena
15	MF	Emily van Egmond	May 8, 2014	in	Jun 7, 2014	Signed	Western Sydney Wanderers
21	FW	Hayley Brock	Jun 4, 2014	out	May 28, 2014	Injured	
38	MF	Julianne Sitch	Jul 31, 2014	out	Jul 20, 2014	Waived	
14	DF	Taryn Hemmings	Sep 1, 2014	out	Aug 16, 2014	Loaned	Fortuna Hjørring
6	DF	Abby Erceg	Sep 4, 2014	out	Aug 16, 2014	Loaned	FF USV Jena
16	DF	Samantha Johnson	Sep 5, 2014	out	Jun 18, 2014	Loaned	Sydney FC
15	MF	Emily van Egmond	Sep 13, 2014	out	Aug 16, 2014	Waived	New Castle Jets

== Management and staff ==
Front Office
Coaching Staff

- Manager Rory Dames
- First Assistant and Goalkeeper Coach Trae Manny
- Second Assistant Coach Christian Lavers

== Regular-season standings ==
Pos	Team	Pld	W	D	L	GF	GA	GD	Pts	Qualification
1	Seattle Reign FC	24	16	6	2	50	20	+30	54	NWSL Shield
2	FC Kansas City (C)	24	12	5	7	39	32	+7	41	NWSL Playoffs
3	Portland Thorns FC	24	10	6	8	39	35	+4	36	NWSL Playoffs
4	Washington Spirit	24	10	5	9	36	43	−7	35	NWSL Playoffs
5	Chicago Red Stars	24	9	8	7	32	26	+6	35	
6	Sky Blue FC	24	9	7	8	30	37	−7	34	
7	Western New York Flash	24	8	4	12	42	38	+4	28	
8	Boston Breakers	24	6	2	16	37	53	−16	20	
9	Houston Dash	24	5	3	16	23	44	−21	18	

Source: NWSL
Rules for classification: Tiebreakers
(C) Champions

=== Results summary ===
Overall								Home						Away					
Pld	Pts	W	L	T	GF	GA	GD	W	L	T	GF	GA	GD	W	L	T	GF	GA	GD
24	35	9	7	8	32	26	+6	5	2	5	14	10	+4	4	5	3	18	16	+2

Last updated: September 1, 2014
Source: NWSLsoccer.com standings
Pld = Matches played; Pts = Points; W = Matches won; T = Matches tied; L = Matches lost; GF = Goals for; GA = Goals against; GD = Goal difference

== Match results ==
Win Tie Loss

=== Preseason ===
22 March 2014	FC Kansas City	1–1	Chicago Red Stars	Fenton, Missouri
19:00 CDT (UTC−05)	Henderson 83'	Report	Mautz 51'	Stadium: St. Louis Soccer Park; Attendance: 2,300

2 April 2014	Notre Dame	0–2	Chicago Red Stars	Notre Dame, Indiana
18:00 CDT (UTC−05)		Report	Leon 47'; Mautz 66'	Stadium: Alumni Stadium

6 April 2014	Chicago Red Stars	0–0	DePaul University	Lisle, Illinois
16:00 CDT (UTC−05)		Report		Stadium: Village of Lisle-Benedictine University Sports Complex

6 April 2014	Chicago Red Stars	2–0	Oakland University	Lisle, Illinois
17:00 CDT (UTC−05)	Mautz 21'; Chalupny 34'	Report		Stadium: Village of Lisle-Benedictine University Sports Complex

=== National Women's Soccer League ===
April 19, 2014 1	Chicago Red Stars	1–0	Western New York Flash	Bridgeview, Illinois
17:45 CDT (UTC−05)	Johnston 59'	Report		Stadium: Toyota Park; Attendance: 15,743; Referee: Christina Unkel

April 26, 2014 2	Chicago Red Stars	0–1	Washington Spirit	Lisle, Illinois
19:00 CDT (UTC−05)	Johnston (yellow card) 67'	Summary	Huster 50'; Sierra (yellow card) 55'; Dunn (yellow card) 70'; Matheson (yellow card) 71'	Stadium: Village of Lisle-Benedictine University Sports Complex; Attendance: 1,822; Referee: Mark Allatin

April 30, 2014 3	FC Kansas City	1–0	Chicago Red Stars	Kansas City, Missouri
19:00 CDT (UTC−05)	Rodriguez 9'	Summary		Stadium: Durwood Soccer Stadium; Attendance: 1,679; Referee: Josh Wilkens

May 7, 2014 4	Sky Blue FC	1–1	Chicago Red Stars	Piscataway, New Jersey
19:00 EDT (UTC−04)	Goodson (yellow card) 13'; Freels 27' (pen.)	Summary	Mautz (yellow card) 25'; Brock 58'; Hoy (yellow card) 88'	Stadium: Yurcak Field; Attendance: 604; Referee: Dimitar Chavdarov

May 11, 2014 5	Chicago Red Stars	1–0	Houston Dash	Lisle, Illinois
20:00 CDT (UTC−05)	Hoy 33'; Leon (yellow card) 59'	Summary	Masar (yellow card) 64'; Henninger (yellow card) 75'	Stadium: Village of Lisle-Benedictine University Sports Complex; Attendance: 1,039; Referee: Miguel Panduro

May 15, 2014 6	Boston Breakers	1–3	Chicago Red Stars	Boston
19:00 EDT (UTC−04)	Jones 19' (yellow card) 56'; Lohman (yellow card) 42'	Summary	Chalupny 44'; Leon (yellow card) 47'; Wenino 52'; Hoy 67'; Mautz (yellow card) 77'	Stadium: Harvard Stadium; Attendance: 1,696; Referee: Mark Allatin

May 18, 2014 7	Boston Breakers	1–4	Chicago Red Stars	Boston
18:30 EDT (UTC−04)	O'Reilly 35' (pen.)	Summary	Wenino 23'; Hoy 50'; Chalupny 57'; Bywaters 85'	Stadium: Harvard Stadium; Attendance: 2,123; Referee: Kristen Salazar

May 23, 2014 8	Houston Dash	1–3	Chicago Red Stars	Houston, Texas
19:00 CDT (UTC−05)	Masar 51' (yellow card) 57'	Summary	DiBernardo 10' (pen.); Mautz (yellow card) 23' (goal) 54'; Hoy 62'; Tancredi (yellow card) 75' (yellow-red card) 89'; Quon (yellow card) 78'	Stadium: BBVA Compass Stadium; Attendance: 4,868; Referee: Timon Berry

May 28, 2014 9	Sky Blue FC	0–2	Chicago Red Stars	Piscataway, New Jersey
19:00 EDT (UTC−04)	Foord (yellow card) 84'	Summary	Leon 26'; Chalupny 35'; Johnson (yellow card) 77'	Stadium: Yurcak Field; Attendance: 786; Referee: Matt Mercier

June 4, 2014 10	Chicago Red Stars	0–1	Washington Spirit	Lisle, Illinois
19:00 CDT (UTC−05)	Morway (yellow card) 40'	Summary	Gayle (yellow card) 27'; Taylor 79'; Pérez (yellow card) 90'	Stadium: Village of Lisle-Benedictine University Sports Complex; Attendance: 1,450; Referee: Josh Wilkens

June 7, 2014 11	Seattle Reign FC	3–1	Chicago Red Stars	Seattle, Washington
19:00 PDT (UTC−7)	Barnes (yellow card) 26' Goebel (yellow card) 38'; Leroux (yellow card) 47' (goal) 68' Little 65' (pen.), 77' (pen.)	Summary	Johnston (yellow card) 7' Wenino (yellow card) 45'; Sitch (yellow card) 53' van Egmond 62'	Stadium: Memorial Stadium; Attendance: 4,222; Referee: Dimitar Chavdarov

June 15, 2014 12	Chicago Red Stars	2–2	Sky Blue FC	Lisle, Illinois
13:00 CDT (UTC−05)	Mautz 21'; Bywaters 31'	Summary	Lisonbee-Cutshall 60'; Hayes 63'	Stadium: Village of Lisle-Benedictine University Sports Complex; Attendance: 1,211; Referee: Juliana Duncan

June 18, 2014 13	Western New York Flash	2–0	Chicago Red Stars	Rochester, New York
19:00 EDT (UTC−04)	Taylor 2'; Losada (yellow card) 37'; Kerr 90+1'	Summary	Chalupny (yellow card) 13'; Hemmings (yellow card) 44'; Morway (yellow card) 50'; Santacaterina (yellow card) 85'	Stadium: Sahlen's Stadium; Attendance: 1,786; Referee: Mark Allatin

June 21, 2014 14	FC Kansas City	1–0	Chicago Red Stars	Kansas City, Missouri
19:00 CDT (UTC−05)	Buczkowski 76'	Summary	van Egmond (yellow card) 83'	Stadium: Durwood Soccer Stadium; Attendance: 1,493; Referee: Christina Unkel

July 4, 2014 15	Portland Thorns FC	2–2	Chicago Red Stars	Portland, Oregon
11:00 PDT (UTC−7)	McDonald 24'; Huffman 39' (yellow card) 62'	Summary	Press 76' 82'	Stadium: Providence Park; Attendance: 13,084; Referee: Timon Berry

July 9, 2014 16	Chicago Red Stars	1–1	Portland Thorns FC	Lisle, Illinois
19:00 CDT (UTC−05)	van Egmond 86' (pen.)	Summary	Long 27' (pen.); Huffman (yellow card) 88'	Stadium: Village of Lisle-Benedictine University Sports Complex; Attendance: 2,101

July 12, 2014 17	Chicago Red Stars	1–0	Seattle Reign FC	Lisle, Illinois
19:00 CDT (UTC−05)	Tancredi 8'; Abby Erceg (yellow card) 60'; Bywaters (yellow card) 85'	Report	Reed (yellow card) 80'	Stadium: Village of Lisle-Benedictine University Sports Complex; Attendance: 3,032; Referee: Margaret Domka

July 17, 2014 18	Chicago Red Stars	1–1	Portland Thorns FC	Lisle, Illinois
19:00 CDT (UTC−05)	Boxx (yellow card) 17'; Chalupny 77'	Summary	McDonald 1'; Sinclair (yellow card) 57'; Menges (yellow card) 90+1'	Stadium: Village of Lisle-Benedictine University Sports Complex; Attendance: 2,014; Referee: (United States) Josh Wilkens

July 20, 2014 19	Seattle Reign FC	1–1	Chicago Red Stars	Seattle, Washington
16:00 PDT (UTC−7)	Rapinoe (yellow card) 38'; Goebel 70'	Summary	Johnston (yellow card) 69'; Press 81'	Stadium: Memorial Stadium; Attendance: 3,030; Referee: (United States) David Mon

July 26, 2014 20	Chicago Red Stars	0–0	Houston Dash	Lisle, Illinois
13:00 CDT (UTC−05)	Erceg (yellow card) 61'; Mautz (yellow card) 90+2'	Summary	Ohale (yellow card) 84'	Stadium: Village of Lisle-Benedictine University Sports Complex; Attendance: 1,494; Referee: (United States) Christina Unkel

August 2, 2014 21	Washington Spirit	2–1	Chicago Red Stars	Boyds, Maryland
18:30 EDT (UTC−04)	Nairn 48' (yellow card) 82'; Averbuch 90+4'	Schedule	Chalupny 4'; Hoy (yellow card) 28'; Santacaterina (yellow card) 30'	Stadium: Maryland SoccerPlex

August 9, 2014 22	Chicago Red Stars	2–1	FC Kansas City	Lisle, Illinois
19:00 CDT (UTC−05)	Tancredi 9'; Press 40'	Schedule	Marlborough 43'	Stadium: Village of Lisle-Benedictine University Sports Complex

August 13, 2014 23	Chicago Red Stars	2–0	Boston Breakers	Lisle, Illinois
19:00 CDT (UTC−05)	Mautz 29'; Tancredi 82'	Schedule		Stadium: Village of Lisle-Benedictine University Sports Complex

August 16, 2014 24	Chicago Red Stars	3–3	Western New York Flash	Lisle, Illinois
19:00 CDT (UTC−05)	Press 17' (pen.), 60'; Johnston 90+3'	Schedule	Martin 29'; Lloyd 45+1'; Kerr 49'	Stadium: Village of Lisle-Benedictine University Sports Complex

==== Results by round ====
Round	1	2	3	4	5	6	7	8	9	10	11	12	13	14	15	16	17	18	19	20	21	22	23	24
Stadium	H	H	A	A	H	A	A	A	A	H	A	H	A	A	A	H	H	H	A	H	A	H	H	H
Result	W	L	L	D	W	W	W	W	W	L	L	D	L	L	D	D	W	D	D	D	L	W	W	D

Updated to match(es) played on August 30, 2014. Source: Match reports
A = Away; H = Home; W = Win; D = Draw; L = Loss

== Squad statistics ==
Source: NWSL

Key to positions: FW – Forward, MF – Midfielder, DF – Defender, GK – Goalkeeper

N	Pos	Player	GP	GS	Min	G	A	WG	Shot	SOG	Cro	CK	Off	Foul	FS	YC	RC
7	MF	Shannon Boxx	5	4	245	0	0	0	1	1	0	0	0	7	1	1	0
21	FW	Hayley Brock	8	3	238	1	1	0	9	5	0	0	4	4	0	0	0
5	FW	Zakiya Bywaters	19	10	1086	2	0	0	23	14	1	16	5	8	9	1	0
17	MF	Lori Chalupny	23	22	2003	5	0	0	33	14	1	5	6	28	45	1	0
10	MF	Vanessa DiBernardo	23	19	1782	1	3	0	25	11	5	86	1	14	18	0	0
6	DF	Abby Erceg	11	11	990	0	0	0	3	2	0	0	0	8	2	2	0
14	DF	Taryn Hemmings	15	9	893	0	2	0	3	0	0	0	1	6	8	2	0
2	FW	Jen Hoy	21	16	1354	4	3	2	21	11	4	0	18	18	7	2	0
16	DF	Samantha Johnson	12	11	956	0	1	0	1	1	0	0	0	4	11	1	0
8	DF	Julie Johnston	21	21	1890	2	2	1	19	7	2	0	0	15	19	4	0
19	FW	Adriana Leon	20	15	1173	1	3	1	20	9	1	1	3	26	10	2	0
4	MF	Alyssa Mautz	20	12	1053	3	0	2	16	9	0	0	6	16	8	5	0
3	DF	Kecia Morway	12	10	907	0	0	0	1	0	1	0	1	8	2	2	0
23	FW	Christen Press	12	12	1080	6	0	1	42	26	0	11	14	12	5	0	0
11	DF	Rachel Quon	19	19	1693	0	0	0	1	1	0	0	1	10	6	2	0
24	FW	Niki Read	1	0	6	0	0	0	0	0	0	0	0	0	0	0	0
18	DF	Jackie Santacaterina	13	9	779	0	0	0	2	1	1	0	1	15	4	3	0
38	MF	Julianne Sitch	11	9	762	0	0	0	3	2	1	0	0	17	2	1	0
9	FW	Melissa Tancredi	13	7	682	3	1	1	17	10	0	0	12	13	5	2	1
15	MF	Emily Van Egmond	10	6	633	2	2	0	5	2	0	0	1	11	4	1	0
28	FW	Michele Weissenhofer	1	0	14	0	0	0	1	1	0	0	1	2	0	0	0
13	DF	Michelle Wenino	18	15	1380	2	1	1	8	4	1	0	0	10	13	1	0

N	Pos	Goal keeper	GP	GS	Min	W	L	T	Shot	SOG	Sav	GA	GA/G	Pen	PKF	SO
1	GK	Karina LeBlanc	21	21	1890	9	6	6	202	97	76	21	1.000	4	5	6
20	GK	Taylor Vancil	3	3	270	0	1	2	42	18	13	5	1.667	1	1	0

== Awards ==
=== NWSL awards ===
NWSL Player of the Week

No player of Chicago Red Stars was named Player of the Week in 2014 season.

NWSL Best XI

No player of Chicago Red Stars was named to NWSL Best XI for 2014 season. However, two players, Christen Press and Julie Johnston were named to 2014 NWSL Second XI.

NWSL Rookie of the Year

Julie Johnston was named 2014 NWSL Rookie of the Year, out voting Kealia Ohai and Crystal Dunn.

=== Chicago Red Stars team awards ===
Chicago Red Stars announced on September 2 the 2014 team awards from the staff, media and fans. Notably, Julie Johnston was the Defender of the Year, as well as the Rookie of the Year. In a separate announcement, Christen Press was awarded Golden Boot as the team's top goal scorer despite playing only 12 games; this followed her previous year's performance in the Swedish Damallsvenskan where she was the league's top-scorer with 23 goals, and was awarded the league's Golden Boot.

Team Most Valuable Player

Lori Chalupny

Defender of the Year

Julie Johnston

Rookie of the Year

Julie Johnston

Community Service Award

Karina LeBlanc

Unsung Hero

Abby Erceg

Golden Boot

Christen Press
