= Kecia Morway =

American soccer player

Personal information
- Full name: Kecia Danielle Morway
- Date of birth: August 25, 1991 (age 35)
- Place of birth: Lake Villa, Illinois, United States
- Position: Defender

Youth career
- Chicago Eclipse Select

College career
Years	Team	Apps	(Gls)
2010–2011	Notre Dame Fighting Irish	45	(0)
2012–2013	Colorado College Tigers	44	(0)

Senior career*
Years	Team	Apps	(Gls)
2014	Chicago Red Stars	12	(0)
- * Club domestic league appearances and goals

Kecia Danielle Morway (born August 25, 1991) is an American retired professional soccer player who played as a defender. She played for National Women's Soccer League club Chicago Red Stars during 2014 season.

== Club career ==
In March 2014, Morway joined Chicago Red Stars in the National Women's Soccer League for their preseason, reaching out to Red Stars head coach and childhood club Eclipse Select SC President Rory Dames. She made 12 appearances in her rookie season, predominantly as a left back.

== Personal life ==
In February 2015, Morway announced her retirement from professional soccer, while already working as an educator.

== Career statistics ==
Appearances and goals by club, season and competition
Club	Season	League			Playoffs (Note: Includes NWSL playoffs)		Total	
Club	Season	Division	Apps	Goals	Apps	Goals	Apps	Goals
Chicago Red Stars	2014	NWSL	12	0	—		12	0
Career total			12	0	0	0	12	0

== Honors ==
Notre Dame Fighting Irish

- NCAA Division I women's soccer tournament: 2010
