= Hayley Brock =

American soccer player (born 1992)

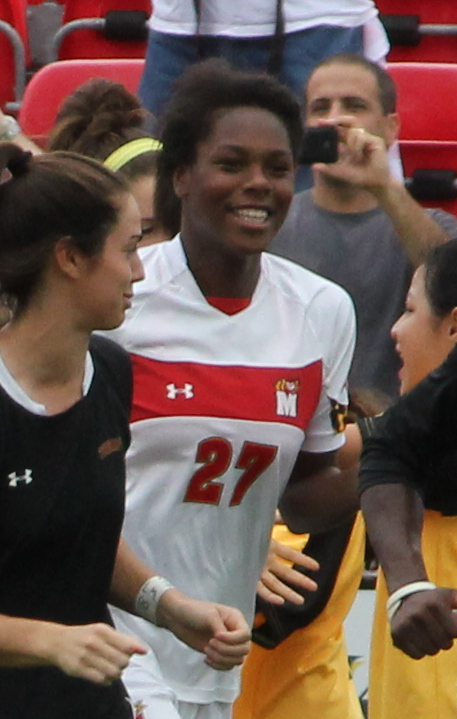

Personal information
- Full name: Hayley Elizabeth Brock
- Date of birth: August 3, 1992 (age 34)
- Place of birth: Boston, Massachusetts, United States
- Height: 5 ft 9 in (1.75 m)
- Position: Forward

College career
Years	Team	Apps	(Gls)
2010	Penn State Nittany Lions		
2011–2013	Maryland Terrapins		

Senior career*
Years	Team	Apps	(Gls)
2014	Chicago Red Stars	8	(1)

International career
2008	United States U17		
- * Club domestic league appearances and goals

Hayley Elizabeth Brock (born August 3, 1992) is an American former soccer player.

== Club career ==
She played as a forward for Chicago Red Stars in 2014. Brock was injured in 2014 National Women's Soccer League season and did not return to play, instead she has returned to school.

== Career statistics ==
Appearances and goals by club, season and competition
Club	Season	League			Playoffs (Note: Includes NWSL playoffs)		Total	
Club	Season	Division	Apps	Goals	Apps	Goals	Apps	Goals
Chicago Red Stars	2014	NWSL	8	1	—		8	1
Career total			8	1	0	0	8	1
