= Zakiya Bywaters =

American soccer player (born 1991)

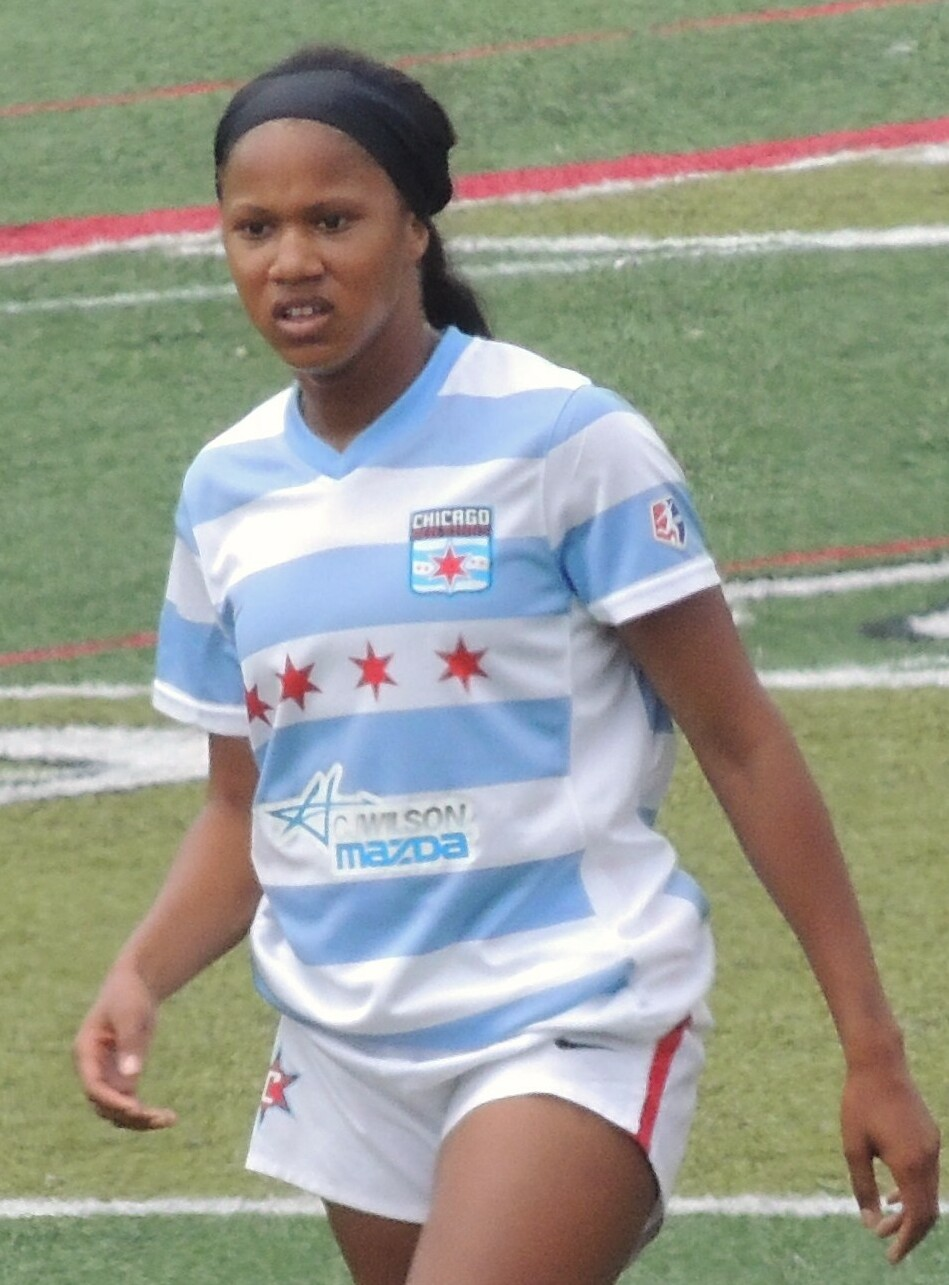
- Bywaters with the Chicago Red Stars in 2014

Personal information
- Full name: Zakiya Abeni Bywaters
- Date of birth: July 24, 1991 (age 35)
- Place of birth: Las Vegas, Nevada, United States
- Height: 5 ft 1 in (1.55 m)
- Positions: Striker; midfielder

College career
Years	Team	Apps	(Gls)
2009–2012	UCLA Bruins		

Senior career*
Years	Team	Apps	(Gls)
2013–2015	Chicago Red Stars	25	(4)

International career
2008–2009	United States U17	5	(1)
2009–2010	United States U20	19	(17)
2010–2013	United States U23	3	(1)
- * Club domestic league appearances and goals

Zakiya Abeni Bywaters (born July 24, 1991) is an American former soccer player. She played as a forward and midfielder for the Chicago Red Stars of the National Women's Soccer League (NWSL). She also played for the United States national under-23 team. A former star player for the UCLA Bruins, Bywaters was the number one pick of the first NWSL draft in 2013.

== Early life ==
Born and raised in Las Vegas, Nevada, to Thomas and Beverly Bywaters, Zakiya attended Rancho High School and played club soccer for the Southern California Blues and Slammers FC. In 2007 and 2008, she was named a NSCAA/adidas Girls Youth All-American. During her senior year in 2009, she was listed as a four-star recruit (21st overall) by Top Drawer Soccer as well as an ESPN RISE Top 50 Recruit (17th overall). She was also named Parade All-American in 2009.

As a youth, Bywaters won four state championships with club team Neusport and helped the team to a regional final at the U-14 level.

=== UCLA Bruins, 2009–2012 ===
Bywaters attended UCLA where she played for the Bruins for four years. In 2009, she was the only freshman to play in all 25 matches. She made 23 starts and ended the season with 11 points on three goals and seven assists. She was named to the Pac-10 All-Freshman Team. During her second year, she was the only field player to start all 23 matches and ended the season with 10 points on three goals and four assists. She was named an Honorable Mention All-Pac-10 selection. During her junior year in 2011, she was one of five players to start all 21 matches and finished with 12 points on three goals and six assists (her assists ranked second on the team). She was named a First-Team All-Pac-12 selection and to the All-Pacific Region First-Team.

During her senior year, Bywaters led the Pac-12 Conference in goals (15), points (34) and game-winning goals (6). She was added to UCLA's Top 10 list for career assists (tied for 7th, 21), career multiple-goal games (tied for 7th, 5) and single-season game-winning goals (tied for 10th, 6). She tallied five multiple-goal games, scoring twice against Princeton, Pepperdine, Arizona, Oregon State and San Diego State and recorded game-winners against Illinois, Pepperdine, Arizona, Arizona State, California and San Diego State. She was named first-team NSCAA All-American, All-Pacific Region and was a MAC Hermann Trophy semi-finalist. Bywaters was named the Pac-12 Player of the Week twice and was the Soccer America National Player of the Week for September 10–16 after recording four goals and one assist in games against Princeton and Pepperdine. She was named to the Top Drawer Soccer Team of the Season first team, was a First-Team All-Pac-12 selection, and earned Pac-12 Player of the Year honors.

== Club career ==
=== Chicago Red Stars, 2013–2015 ===
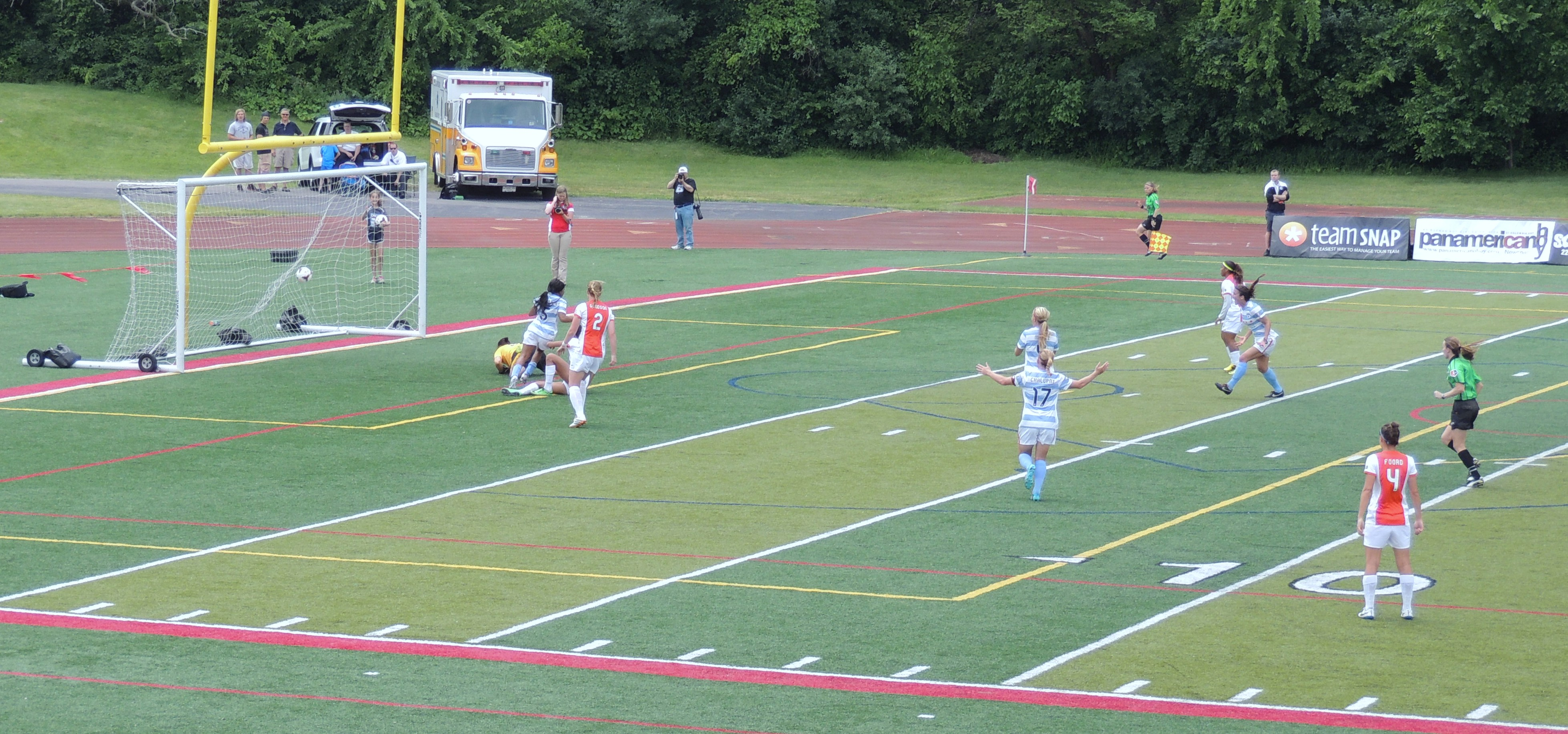
On June 15, 2014, Zakiya Bywaters scored a goal for Chicago Red Stars against Sky Blue FC, assisted by Jen Hoy. Left to right: 21-Jill Loyden (GK), 5-Zakiya Bywaters, 18-Lindsi Cutshall, 2-CoCo Goodson, 4-Alyssa Mautz, 17-Lori Chalupny (c), 32-Meg Morris, 2-Jen Hoy, 4-Caitlin Foord

Bywaters was the number one pick in the 2013 NWSL College Draft (the league's inaugural draft) by the Chicago Red Stars. Of her selection, Red Stars head coach Rory Dames said, "Zakiya possesses a great combination of technique and pace. She has the ability to play multiple positions and we believe she will push hard for future national team call-ups."" During the 2013 season, Bywaters scored two goals in her six appearances for the club after being sidelined for part of the season due to injuries. Chicago finished sixth in the regular season with a 8–8–6 record.

During the 2014 season, Bywaters made 19 appearances for the club. She scored her first goal of the season in the 85th minute against the Boston Breakers on May 19 helping the Red Stars win 4–1. In June, she scored her second goal of the season against Sky Blue FC. Chicago finished in fifth place during the regular season with a 9–7–8 record.

After missing the 2015 season recovering from hip surgery, Bywaters was waived by the Red Stars prior to the 2016 season.

== International career ==
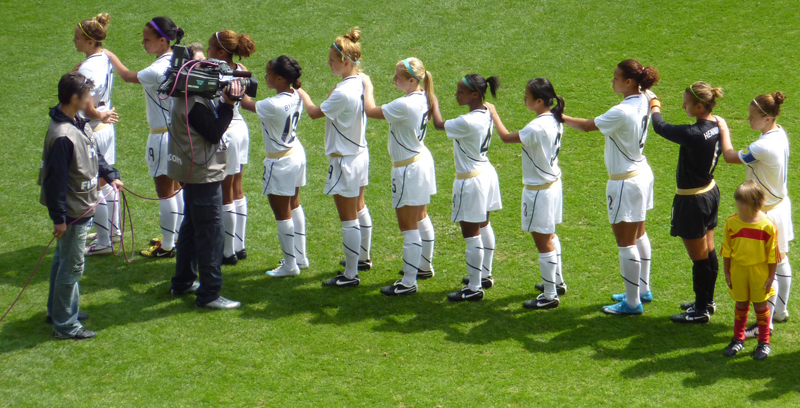
Bywaters (fourth from left) with the United States under-20 women's national soccer team at the 2010 FIFA U-20 Women's World Cup

Bywaters has represented the United States at various levels including the U-16, U-17, U-20, and U-23 national teams. She played for the United States women's national under-17 soccer team in 2008. She played in five matches for the team and scored one goal. In 2010, she competed with the United States under-20 women's national soccer team at the 2010 FIFA U-20 Women's World Cup in Germany and won gold at the 2010 CONCACAF Women's U-20 Championship in Guatemala.

In January 2013, following her draft to Chicago Red Stars at the 2013 NWSL College Draft, she was called into training camp for the U.S. senior national team by head coach Tom Sermanni.

== See also ==
- List of University of California, Los Angeles people
- 2010 FIFA U-20 Women's World Cup squads
- Athlete Ally
