= Eclipse Select SC =

Eclipse Select Soccer Club
- Company type: Soccer club
- Industry: Youth Soccer Club
- Founded: 1996
- Owner: Rory Dames
- Website: www.eclipseselect.org

The Eclipse Select Soccer Club or just Eclipse, is an American soccer club for boys and girls in the Chicago metropolitan area. Founded in 1996, Eclipse has teams in local, regional, and national competitions, including the Elite Clubs National League (ECNL), US Club Soccer, and the United States Youth Soccer Association (USYSA).

== Locations ==
Eclipse serves multiple locations in the Chicago area, serving the north (Northbrook), east (Oak Brook), Darien, Ill., and west (Naperville) suburbs. The clubs' ECNL teams compete out of the North location.

In July 2012, Eclipse expanded to Wisconsin to form FC Wisconsin Eclipse. The club ended the Eclipse relationship at the end of the 2017-18 season.

In March 2021, Eclipse agreed to an affiliation agreement with Illinois Fire Juniors, an official affiliate program of the Chicago Fire FC, to establish Eclipse Select Central Illinois. The Central Illinois club ended the agreement in 2022, changed their name to Central Illinois United, and left the ECNL Regional League to join Girls Academy.

== Misconduct allegations ==
On November 22, 2021, The Washington Post published an article with allegations from players, both previous and current, of abuse by Eclipse founder Rory Dames. The Post provided documentation of reports made to the United States Soccer Federation by players, such as Christen Press, as far back as 2014, detailing abuse, harassment, and inappropriate use of power as head coach to manipulate players.

"Three former Red Stars players, including one who played on the team at the time of the investigation, told The Post that they had wanted to speak to U.S. Soccer investigators but had never heard from them," reported Hensley-Clancy. "Two had left the team because of Dames's abuse", they said.

On February 8, 2022, the Washington Post published a follow-up story reporting claims of misconduct dating back to the late 1990s, including a 1998 police report involving a youth player Dames coached at Eclipse. The allegations went further, including multiple players claiming to have had a sexual relationship with Dames with they played for him at Eclipse. An accuser claimed that sex "felt almost expected". The verbal abuse also included constant name-calling, such as pussies, fucking idiots, fat ass, and retards.

Dames' role in the founding of Elite Clubs National League, an elite group of youth soccer clubs, of which he sat on the Board of Directors, and his role with the Chicago Red Stars and NWSL, played a role in players not speaking up, according to accusers. Players and parents were afraid Dames "could ruin the chance at a scholarship or a spot in the professional league," if they spoke up. "But the monopoly over Chicago soccer, our belief that his connection to the college world was the only connection we would have — he used all of that to get away with doing and saying whatever the hell he wanted to us," said an accuser.

Dames' attorney claimed the allegations from the report were "unfounded."

== Notable former players ==
- Jen Buczkowski*
- Brittany Bock
- Liz Bogus
- Michele Dalton
- Sarah Uyenishi Dames**
- Amy LePeilbet* - 2012 Olympic Gold medalist (United States)
- Leslie Osborne* (United States)
- Rachel Quon* (Canada)
- Jackie Santacaterina*
- Alex Scott (England)
- Casey Short* (United States)
- Julianne Sitch*
- Taylor Vancil*
- Elise Weber*
- Carmen Franco
- Tatumn Milazzo*
- Korbin Albert

* indicates current/past member of Chicago Red Stars
Flags indicate players capped by their national team

** a SafeSport investigation was opened in 2019 based on Rory Dames sexual relationship with Sarah Uyenishi when she was a player. They are now married and have children.
