= 2013 NWSL College Draft =

US soccer draft

General information
- Sport: Soccer
- Date: January 18, 2013
- Location: Indianapolis, Indiana

Overview
- 32 total selections in 4 rounds
- League: NWSL
- First selection: Zakiya Bywaters, Chicago Red Stars

The 2013 NWSL College Draft was the first annual college draft held by the National Women's Soccer League to assign the NWSL rights of college players to the eight NWSL teams. It took place on January 18, 2013, at the National Soccer Coaches Association of America (NSCAA) Convention in Indianapolis, Indiana.

== Format ==
- Draft order was determined by weighted draw based on an evaluation of current team strengths from the NWSL Player Allocation.
- The order remains the same each round, as opposed to the originally announced snake format.
- Teams will have three minutes to choose a player in each of the first two rounds and five minutes in each of the last two rounds.

== Results ==
=== Key ===
Pos.	G	D	M	F
Position	Goalkeeper	Defender	Midfielder	Forward

^{+}	Denotes player who has been selected as NWSL Most Valuable Player
^{*}	Denotes player who has been selected for an NWSL Best XI or NWSL Second XI team
^{^}	Denotes player who has been selected as NWSL Rookie of the Year
^{#}	Denotes player who has never appeared in an NWSL regular season or playoff game

=== Picks ===
Round	Pick	Nat.	Player	Pos.	NWSL team	College
Round 1	1	(United States)	Zakiya Bywaters	F	Chicago Red Stars	UCLA
Round 1	2	(United States)	Tiffany McCarty	F	Washington Spirit	Florida State
Round 1	3	(United States)	Kristie Mewis	M	FC Kansas City	Boston College
Round 1	4	(United States)	Lindsi Lisonbee Cutshall	D	Sky Blue FC	BYU
Round 1	5	(United States)	Casey Short^{*}	D	Boston Breakers	Florida State
Round 1	6	(United States)	Adrianna Franch^{*}	G	Western New York Flash	Oklahoma State
Round 1	7	(United States)	Christine Nairn	M	Seattle Reign FC	Penn State
Round 1	8	(United States)	Kat Williamson	D	Portland Thorns FC	Florida
Round 2	9	(Canada)	Rachel Quon	D	Chicago Red Stars	Stanford
Round 2	10	(United States)	Caroline Miller	F	Washington Spirit	Virginia
Round 2	11	(United States)	Erika Tymrak^{^}	M	FC Kansas City	Florida
Round 2	12	(United States)	Kendall Johnson	D	Sky Blue FC	Portland
Round 2	13	(Samoa)	Mariah Nogueira	M	Boston Breakers	Stanford
Round 2	14	(United States)	Amy Barczuk	M	Western New York Flash	Colorado
Round 2	15	(United States)	Mallory Schaffer^{#}	M	Seattle Reign FC	William & Mary
Round 2	16	(United States)	Nicolette Radovcic^{#}	F	Portland Thorns FC	UCF
Round 3	17	(United States)	Taylor Vancil	G	Chicago Red Stars	Florida State
Round 3	18	(United States)	Holly King	M	Washington Spirit	Florida
Round 3	19	(United States)	Whitney Berry^{#}	M	FC Kansas City	Kansas
Round 3	20	(England)	Ashley Baker	G	Sky Blue FC	Georgia
Round 3	21	(United States)	Jo Dragotta	M	Boston Breakers	Florida
Round 3	22	(United States)	Vicki DiMartino	F	Western New York Flash	Boston College
Round 3	23	(United States)	Kristen Meier	M	Seattle Reign FC	Wake Forest
Round 3	24	(United States)	Amber Brooks	M	Portland Thorns FC	North Carolina
Round 4	25	(United States)	Jen Hoy	F	Chicago Red Stars	Princeton
Round 4	26	(United States)	Colleen Williams	M	Washington Spirit	Dayton
Round 4	27	(United States)	Nia Williams	D	FC Kansas City	Missouri State
Round 4	28	(United States)	Becky Kaplan^{#}	F	Sky Blue FC	Maryland
Round 4	29	(United States)	Maddy Evans	M	Boston Breakers	Penn State
Round 4	30	(United States)	Jackie Logue^{#}	D	Western New York Flash	Wake Forest
Round 4	31	(United States)	Haley Kopmeyer	G	Seattle Reign FC	Michigan
Round 4	32	(South Africa)	Roxanne Barker^{#}	G	Portland Thorns FC	Pepperdine

== Summary ==
In 2013, a total of 23 colleges had players selected. By virtue of it being the first NWSL College Draft, all of the following 23 had a player drafted to the NWSL for the first time: Boston College, BYU, Colorado, Dayton, Florida, Florida State, Georgia, Kansas, Maryland, Michigan, Missouri State, North Carolina, Oklahoma State, Penn State, Pepperdine, Portland, Princeton, Stanford, UCF, UCLA, Virginia, Wake Forest and William & Mary.

=== Schools with multiple draft selections ===
Selections	Schools
4	Florida
3	Florida State
2	Boston College, Penn State, Stanford, Wake Forest

=== Selections by college athletic conference ===
Conference	Round 1	Round 2	Round 3	Round 4	Total
ACC	3	1	4	1	9
Atlantic 10	0	0	0	1	1
Big Ten	1	0	0	3	4
Big 12	1	0	1	0	2
Colonial	0	1	0	0	1
Ivy League	0	0	0	1	1
Missouri Valley	0	0	0	1	1
Pac-12	1	3	0	0	4
SEC	1	1	3	0	5
The American	0	1	0	0	1
West Coast	1	1	0	1	3

=== Selections by position ===
Position	Round 1	Round 2	Round 3	Round 4	Total
Goalkeeper	1	0	2	2	5
Defender	3	2	0	2	7
Midfielder	2	4	5	2	13
Forward	2	2	1	2	7

== See also ==
- List of NWSL drafts
- List of National Women's Soccer League draftees by college team
- 2013 National Women's Soccer League season
