= Michele Dalton =

American professional soccer goalkeeper

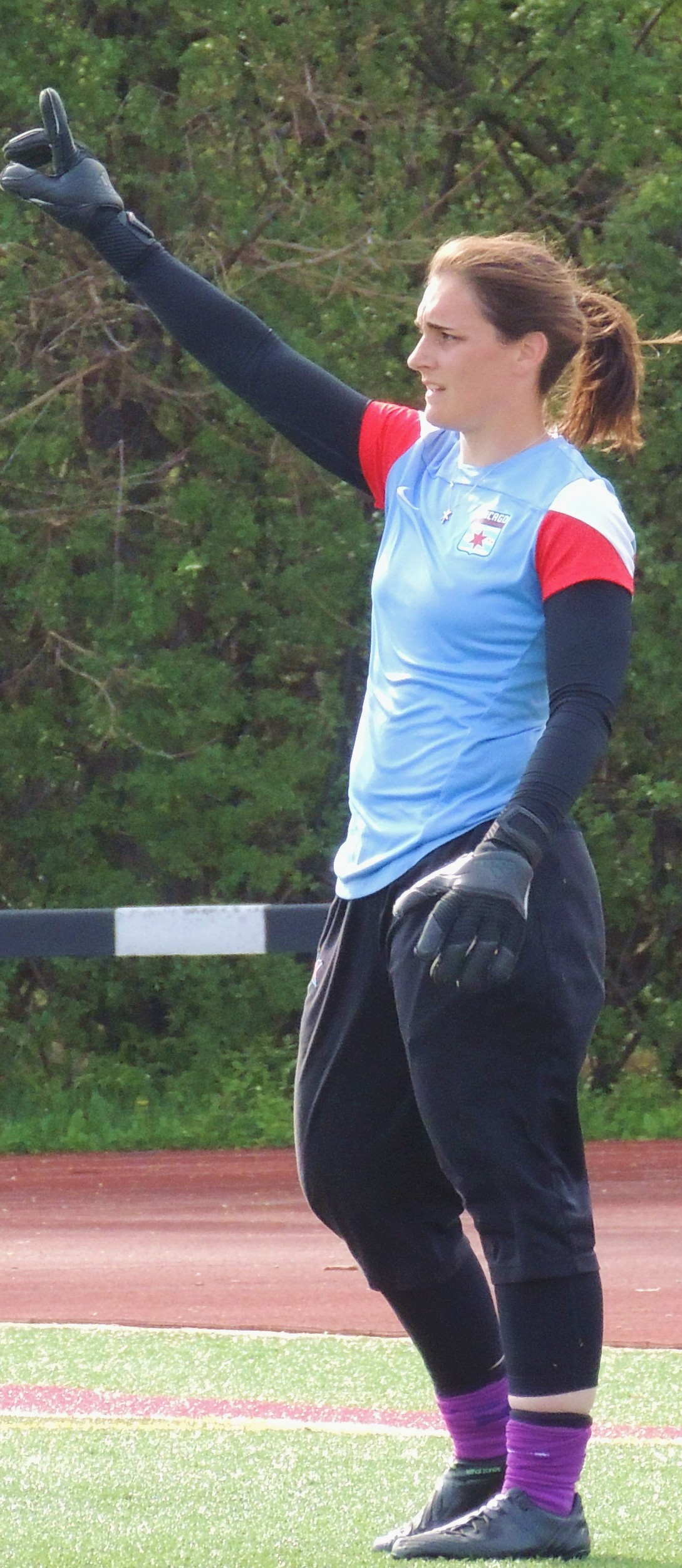
- Michele Dalton as a Red Star, on May 2, 2015

Personal information
- Full name: Michele Dalton
- Place of birth: Chicago, Illinois, United States
- Height: 5 ft 7 in (1.70 m)
- Position: Goalkeeper

Youth career
- 1993–2006: Green White S.C.
- 2006–2008: Chicago Eclipse Select
- 2009–2010: San Diego United
- 2011: Madison 56ers

College career
Years	Team	Apps	(Gls)
2007–2011	Wisconsin Badgers	58	(0)

Senior career*
Years	Team	Apps	(Gls)
2012	Philadelphia Fever	14	(0)
2013	UMF Selfoss	17	(0)
2014	Kvarnsvedens IK	30	(1)
2015–2017	Chicago Red Stars	22	(0)
2018	North Carolina Courage	0	(0)
2018–2019	Apollon LFC	17	(0)
- * Club domestic league appearances and goals as of October 23, 2017

Michele Dalton is a retired American professional soccer goalkeeper.

== Early life ==
Dalton was three-time all-conference, all-area and all-sectional selection at John Hersey High School. She played her youth club soccer for Chicago Eclipse Select during the 2006–2008 seasons. Prior to that, she played for a small, local club Mount Prospect Green and White S.C. from 1993 to 2006.

== University of Wisconsin ==
Michele Dalton attended University of Wisconsin between 2007 and 2011. As a starter between 2009 and 2011, she recorded 5528 minutes in 58 matches, with 54 goals against at an average of 0.879 per match, 29 wins and 13 ties. Dalton was 2011 Big Ten Goalkeeper of the Year, 1st Team All-Conference, NSCAA All-Great Lakes Region 2nd Team and two time team MVP. In 2008, Dalton was Academic All-Big Ten.

=== Records (Wisconsin) ===
Saves/game: 7th all-time (12 saves – September 20, 2009), 10th all-time (11 saves – October 7, 2011)

Saves/season: 3rd all-time (98 saves – 2011) and 5th all-time (95 saves – 2009) GAA/season: 4th all-time (0.470 – 2010) and 9th all-time (0.960 – 2011) Shutouts/season: 5th all-time (11 shutouts – 2010) and 11th all-time (7 shutouts – 2009)

Saves/career: 5th all-time – 273 saves, Saves/game in career: 2nd all-time – 4.707, GAA/career: 6th all-time – .879, Shutouts/career: 5th all-time – 24

=== Records (Big Ten Conference) ===
- Season Shutouts: 11 (2010)
- Season Fewest Goals Allowed: 9 (2010) Season GAA: 0.47 (2010)

== Amateur career ==
=== San Diego United ===
During the 2009 and 2010 summer's, Dalton played for San Diego United of the WPSL where she was 2009 Goalkeeper of the Year and 2009 All-Pacific Team.

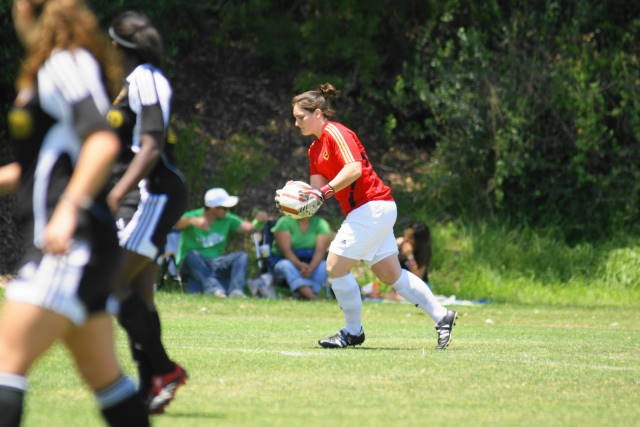
Dalton playing for San Diego United

=== Madison 56ers ===
In the summer of 2011, Dalton played for the Madison 56ers of the WPSL.

=== Philadelphia Fever ===
In 2012 Dalton played for Philadelphia Fever in Women's Premier Soccer League Elite.

== Professional career ==
=== UMF Selfoss ===
In 2013 Dalton played for UMF Selfoss in the Icelandic top division. Dalton posted five shutouts in 17 matches and helped the side finish sixth in a ten team league. She was voted team MVP for her efforts.

=== Kvarnsvedens IK ===
In 2014 Dalton played for Kvarnsvedens IK in Swedish second division, with 7 shutouts, 1.19 goal against average, and helped the team to fifth-place among 14 teams.

=== Chicago Red Stars ===
On April 16, 2015 Chicago Red Stars announced the signing of Michele Dalton for 2015 season in National Women's Soccer League. Concluding the regular season, Dalton led the league in GAA (0.917), finished second overall in shutouts (5), and led the Chicago Red Stars to a franchise best 2nd-place finish.

=== North Carolina Courage ===
On May 18, 2018 North Carolina Courage announced the signing of Dalton as a goalkeeper replacement for injured goalkeeper Sabrina D'Angelo.

=== Apollon LFC ===
During the 2018/2019 season, Dalton played for Apollon LFC in Cypriot first division. Appearing in 17 matches, Dalton led Apollon to a league championship and a UEFA Women's Champions League qualification.

== Personal ==
Michele Dalton grew up in Illinois, attended John Hersey High School and calls Mount Prospect her hometown. While at University of Wisconsin Michele was not only successful in the class-room and on the soccer-field, she also created a campus-wide food drive called the "Red and White Hunger Fight".

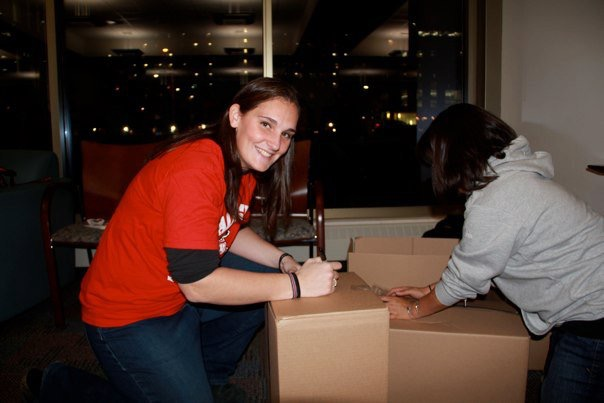
RWHF Coordinator Michele Dalton helping to pack boxes

== Honors and awards ==
Michele is a four time recipient of the Community Service Award presented to student athletes at the University of Wisconsin. Dalton is also a six time Big Ten Player of the Week: September 28, 2009, September 20, 2009, September 27, 2009, October 4, 2010, October 10, 2011, and October 24, 2011. Michele Dalton was a Wooden Cup honorable mention in 2009 and a University of Wisconsin Student Athlete of the Year Nominee in 2011. In January 2016, Dalton was named a finalist for the CONCACAF Female Goalkeeper of the Year award.
