= Rory Dames =

American soccer coach (born 1973)

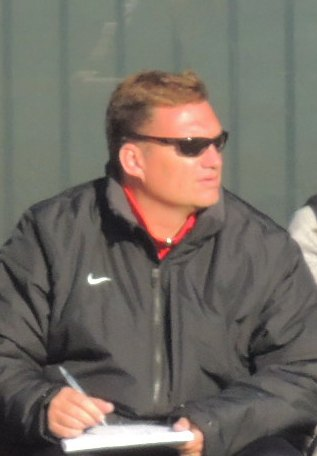
- Rory Dames on April 3, 2016

Personal information
- Full name: Rory Dames Jr.
- Date of birth: February 10, 1973 (age 53)
- Place of birth: Chicago, Illinois, U.S.
- Height: 5 ft 9 in (1.75 m)
- Position: Defender

Youth career
- 1987–1991: St. Viator Lions

College career
Years	Team	Apps	(Gls)
1991–1994	Saint Louis Billikens	52	(1)

Senior career*
Years	Team	Apps	(Gls)
1994	Rockford Raptors		

Managerial career
- 1997–2021: Chicago Eclipse Select
- 2011–2021: Chicago Red Stars
- * Club domestic league appearances and goals

Rory Dames Jr. (born February 10, 1973) is an American soccer coach who most recently was the head coach of the Chicago Red Stars in the National Women's Soccer League (NWSL). He is the owner and former president of Chicago Eclipse Select, a youth soccer club in suburban Chicago. In 2023 Dames was banned for life from the NWSL because of alleged misconduct concerning players in his charge.

== Early life ==
Dames was born and raised in Chicago, Illinois. He played soccer at St. Viator High School in the suburb of Arlington Heights, where he graduated in 1991. He attended Saint Louis University and played for the men's soccer team. In four seasons, Dames made 52 appearances as a defender, scoring one goal and recording 3 assists. Dames then joined the Rockford Raptors for one professional season.

== Managerial career ==
Dames was the director of coaching and player development for Chicago Eclipse Select, which consisted of three teams when the Illinois native took over. The club has more than 50 male and female teams, and more than 750 players ranging in age from 8 to 19. The club produced players who have earned Division I scholarships, professional contracts and roster spots on all levels of the U.S. women's national teams.

Dames began coaching the Chicago Red Stars in 2011, reaching the WPSL finals and losing in overtime. In 2013 the Chicago Red Stars began playing in the National Women's Soccer League.

For four consecutive years, 2015 to 2018, Dames coached the Red Stars to National Women's Soccer League postseason playoffs, losing in the semi-finals on each occasion. In 2019, Dames and the Red Stars defeated the Portland Thorns 1–0 to advance to the NWSL Championship for the first time in team history, where they eventually fell to North Carolina Courage 4–0. In 2021, the Red Stars again advanced to the NWSL Championship held in Louisville but lost to the Washington Spirit 2–1.

On November 22, 2021, the Red Stars announced that Dames had resigned. In February 2022, Red Stars owner Arnim Whisler, stated Dames was allowed to resign because it “didn’t have any reason to believe that there was a safety issue in our environment.” Whisler noted that if Dames did not resign, he would have been terminated.

=== Misconduct allegations ===
On November 22, 2021, The Washington Post published an article with allegations from players, both previous and current, of abuse by Dames. The Post provided documentation of reports made to the United States Soccer Federation by players, such as Christen Press, as far back as 2014, detailing abuse, harassment, and inappropriate use of power as head coach to manipulate players.

“Three former Red Stars players, including one who played on the team at the time of the investigation, told The Post that they had wanted to speak to U.S. Soccer investigators but had never heard from them,” reported Hensley-Clancy. “Two had left the team because of Dames’s abuse, they said.”

In February 2022, the Washington Post published a follow-up story reporting claims of misconduct dating back to the late 1990s, including a 1998 police report involving a youth player Dames coached at Chicago Eclipse Select. The allegations went further, including multiple players claiming to have had a sexual relationship with Dames when they played for him at Eclipse. An accuser claimed that sex “felt almost expected”. The verbal abuse also included constant name-calling, such as pussies, fucking idiots, fat ass, and retards.

Dames’ role in the founding of Elite Clubs National League, an elite group of youth soccer clubs of which he sat on the Board of Directors, and his role with the Chicago Red Stars and NWSL, played a role in players not speaking up, according to accusers. Players and parents were afraid Dames “could ruin the chance at a scholarship or a spot in the professional league,” if they spoke up. “But the monopoly over Chicago soccer, our belief that his connection to the college world was the only connection we would have — he used all of that to get away with doing and saying whatever the hell he wanted to us,” said an accuser.

Dames’ attorney claimed the allegations from the report were “unfounded.” Dames stepped down as the President of Eclipse after resigning from the Red Stars. The organization "did not respond to questions about whether Dames still owned Eclipse or was involved in its governance,” suggesting he is still the owner and the majority controlling interest in the club's operations.

On January 9, 2023, Dames was banned from the NWSL for life, along with three other coaches named in the scandal.

=== Coaching record ===
Team	League	Year	Record					Result	
Team	League	Year	G	W	D	L	Win %	League	Playoff
Chicago Red Stars	WPSL	2011	13	11	0	2	85%	1st	Runners-up
Chicago Red Stars	WPSLE	2012	22	15	2	5	73%	4th	Runners-up
Chicago Red Stars	NWSL	2013	22	8	6	8	50%	6th	X
Chicago Red Stars	NWSL	2014	24	9	8	7	54%	5th	X
Chicago Red Stars	NWSL	2015	21	8	9	4	59%	2nd	semi-final
Chicago Red Stars	NWSL	2016	21	9	6	6	57%	3rd	semi-final
Chicago Red Stars	NWSL	2017	25	11	6	8	56%	4th	semi-final
Chicago Red Stars	NWSL	2018	25	9	10	6	56%	4th	semi-final
Chicago Red Stars	NWSL	2019	26	15	2	9	58%	2nd	Runner-up
Chicago Red Stars	NWSL	2021	24	11	5	8	58%	4th	Runner-up
Career total			223	106	54	63	60%		

== Personal life ==
Dames is married to Sarah Uyenishi. Uyenishi played soccer for Chicago Eclipse Select starting at age 14, where Dames was her coach. They have two children. A SafeSport investigation was opened in March 2019 based on receiving “a report alleging that Responding Party Rory Dames had a relationship with a former player, while she was a player on his team, and subsequently married and had a child with her.”
