= Rachel Quon =

American-Canadian former soccer defender

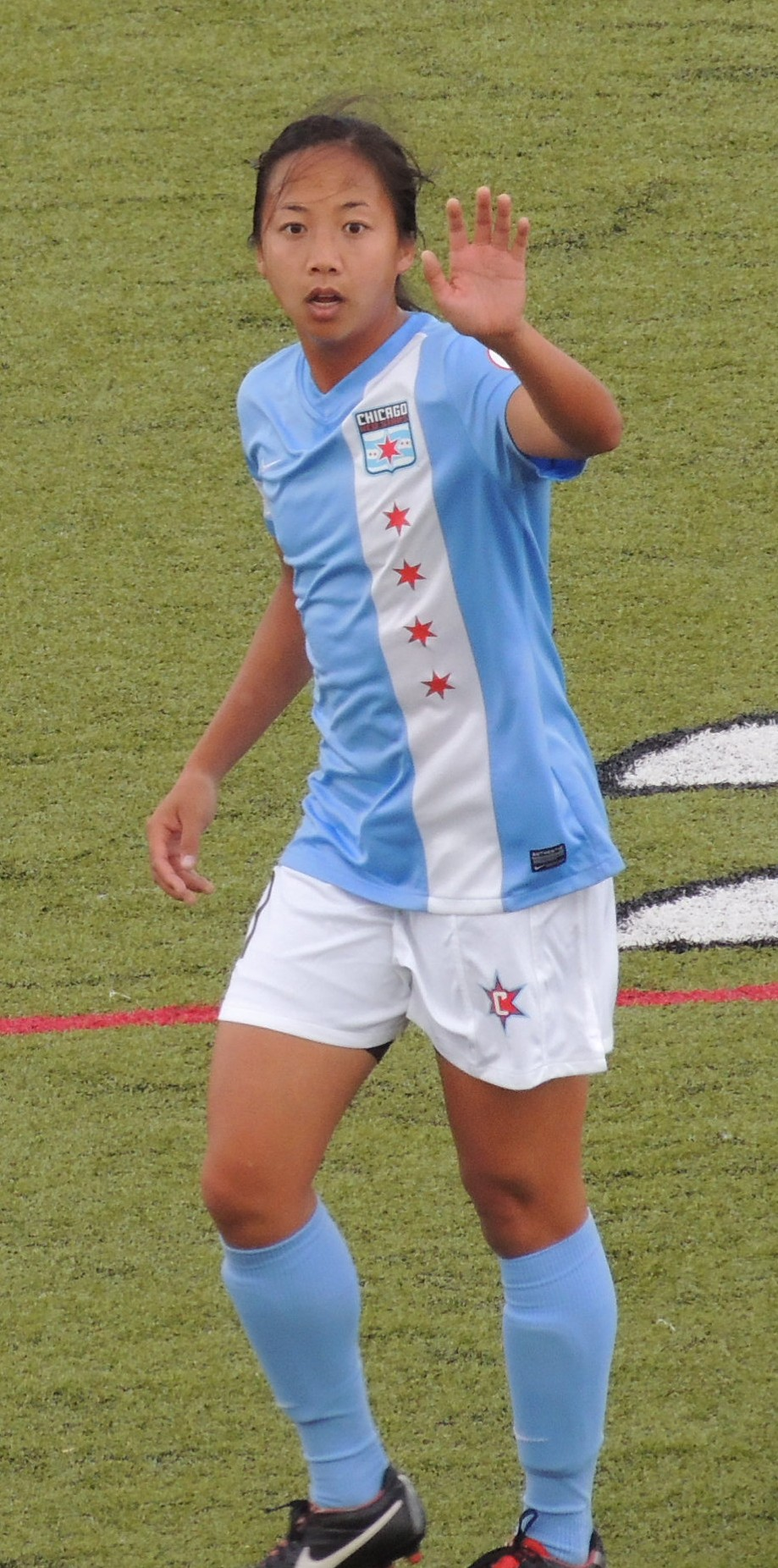
- June 9, 2013; Rachel Quon in Chicago Red Stars vs Boston Breakers

Personal information
- Full name: Rachel Moy Quon
- Date of birth: May 21, 1991 (age 35)
- Place of birth: Los Angeles, California, United States
- Height: 5 ft 3 in (1.60 m)
- Position: Defender

Youth career
- 2006–2009: Eclipse Select 90/91

College career
Years	Team	Apps	(Gls)
2009–2012	Stanford Cardinal	50	(2)

Senior career*
Years	Team	Apps	(Gls)
2013–2015	Chicago Red Stars	55	(0)

International career
2009–2011	United States U20	9	
2012	United States U23		
2014	Canada	4	(0)
- * Club domestic league appearances and goals

Rachel Moy Quon (born May 21, 1991) is an American-Canadian former soccer defender. She played for the Chicago Red Stars in the National Women's Soccer League and for the Canada women's national soccer team.

== Early life ==
Quon was born in Los Angeles, California, to a Canadian father and an American mother. She grew up in Lake Forest, Illinois, and attended Lake Forest High School. As a freshman in 2006, she was named All-Section and All-Conference. During her second year, she provided the most assists on her team and was voted All-State and All-Conference, and was named NSCAA All-American. She did not play high school soccer during her junior year, but scored 25 goals with 21 assists during her first two seasons. In 2009, she scored 15 goals and had 10 assists to lead the Scouts to a 2009 regional title and into the Class 3A sectionals. She was named the 2009 National Gatorade High School Player of the Year as well as Illinois State Player of the Year. She was also named to the 2009 Parade Magazine and ESPN Rise All-America teams. She left Lake Forest High School with 40 goals and 31 assists over just three high school seasons.

Quon also played for the club team, Eclipse Select 90/91 and helped lead the team to the 2006 national U-15 club title, 2008 U-17 final, two Region II championships, and three Illinois State Cup titles. The team won four consecutive Illinois State Cups. Quon was rated as the nation's number 18 college prospect for the class of 2009 by Top Drawer Soccer and number 35 by ESPN Rise.

=== Stanford University ===
Quon attended Stanford University, where she played for the Cardinal from 2009 to 2012. As a freshman in 2009, she started all 24 games and helped the team to an undefeated regular season and a berth in the NCAA title game. She served four assists during the season and was a First-Team All-Pac-10 selection as well as a member of the Pac-10 All-Freshman team.

As a sophomore in 2010, Quon helped the Cardinal to 15 shutouts and a 0.45 goals-against average and was named to the MAC Hermann Trophy Watch List. She started all 26 matches at outside right back and scored her first two collegiate goals. She was named to TopDrawerSoccer.com's Team of the Season first team and to the All-Pac-10 first team for the second consecutive season.

As a junior in 2011, Quon was named to the All-Pac-12-second team and was a Pac-12 All-Academic honourable mention as well All White Kit Preseason All-American. During the NCAA quarterfinals, Quon saved a ball off the line and then provided an assist on the 93rd-minute winner in a 2–1 overtime victory over Oklahoma State. She made an overlapping run, reached the end line and pulled back a centring pass to the top of the six-yard box to Lindsay Taylor, whose first touch from five yards out won the match.

During her senior year, Quon served as team captain and was named NSCAA first-team All-American and Soccer America MVP's second team. She was also a TopDrawerSoccer.com Team of the Season second-team choice and named to the NSCAA All-Pacific Region first team. She was an All-Pac-12 first-team selection for the third time and a four-year all-conference selection. She was a finalist for the MAC Hermann Trophy and was a Pac-12 All-Academic honourable mention.

== Club career ==
=== Chicago Red Stars ===
In January 2013, Quon was drafted in the second round (ninth pick overall) of the 2013 NWSL College Draft to the Chicago Red Stars in the National Women's Soccer League.

After three seasons and 55 matches with the Red Stars, on March 14, 2016, Chicago Red Stars announced that Quon would not return for the 2016 season.

== International career ==
Quon has represented the United States at the U-15, U-16, U-17, U-18, U-20 levels. She was a member of the US team that won the 2010 CONCACAF Under-20 Women's Championship in Guatemala to earn a berth to the 2010 FIFA U-20 Women's World Cup. She started all five games and played all but eight minutes of the tournament at right back, shoring up two assists. Quon played in 16 total matches for the United States in 2010 before the U-20 Women's World Cup, including 11 international matches.

She was a member of the 2008 U-17 Women's World Cup Team that finished second in New Zealand and played every minute of all five matches at right back. She finished her U-17 career with seven caps. Quon came back to make the U-17 Women's World Cup squad after recovering from a broken collarbone and an ACL tear on the same play while playing with the U-17 team on July 8, 2007.

On May 22, 2013, Quon was called up to the Canada national team squad for their friendly against the United States, but was not granted FIFA clearance in time to play in the match. Quon made her debut for Canada on March 5 against Finland at the 2014 Cyprus Cup.
