= Taylor Vancil =

American soccer player

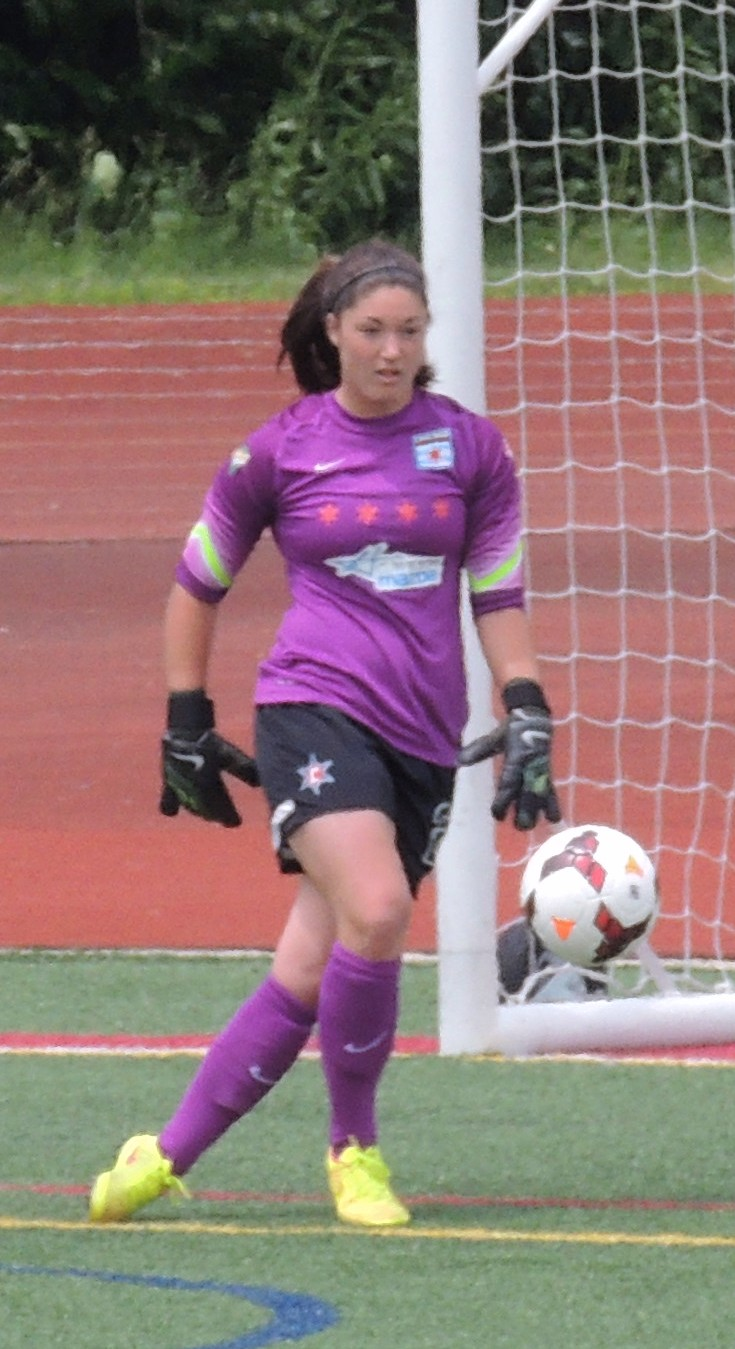
- Vancil playing for Chicago Red Stars, 2014

Personal information
- Full name: Taylor Danielle Vancil
- Date of birth: May 18, 1991 (age 35)
- Place of birth: Youngsville, North Carolina, United States
- Height: 1.71 m (5 ft 7 1/2 in)
- Position: Goalkeeper

Youth career
- 2005–2008: Chicago Eclipse Select

College career
Years	Team	Apps	(Gls)
2009–2010	Louisville Cardinals		
2011–2012	Florida State Seminoles		

Senior career*
Years	Team	Apps	(Gls)
2009	Real Colorado Cougars		
2013–2015	Chicago Red Stars	9	(0)

International career
2008	United States U17	5	(0)
2009–2010	United States U20		
- * Club domestic league appearances and goals as of July 20, 2014

Taylor Danielle Vancil (born May 18, 1991) is a retired American professional women's soccer player who was a goalkeeper for Chicago Red Stars in the National Women's Soccer League.

== Career ==
=== Real Colorado Cougars, 2009 ===
Vancil played for the semi-professional Real Colorado Cougars in the USL W-League in 2009.

=== Chicago Red Stars, 2013–2015 ===
On January 18, 2013, Vancil was drafted in the third round of the 2013 NWSL College Draft by the Chicago Red Stars. Vancil then made her debut for the Red Stars on May 24, 2013, against the Western New York Flash in which she started and played the full 90 minutes as the Red Stars lost the match 2–1.

Vancil announced her retirement from professional soccer in March 2015.

== International ==
Vancil was the #1 goalkeeper for the United States U17s during the 2008 FIFA U-17 Women's World Cup in which she led the United States to the Final where they lost to North Korea 2–1. After the tournament she was awarded the golden gloves award.
