= Taryn Hemmings =

American former professional soccer defender

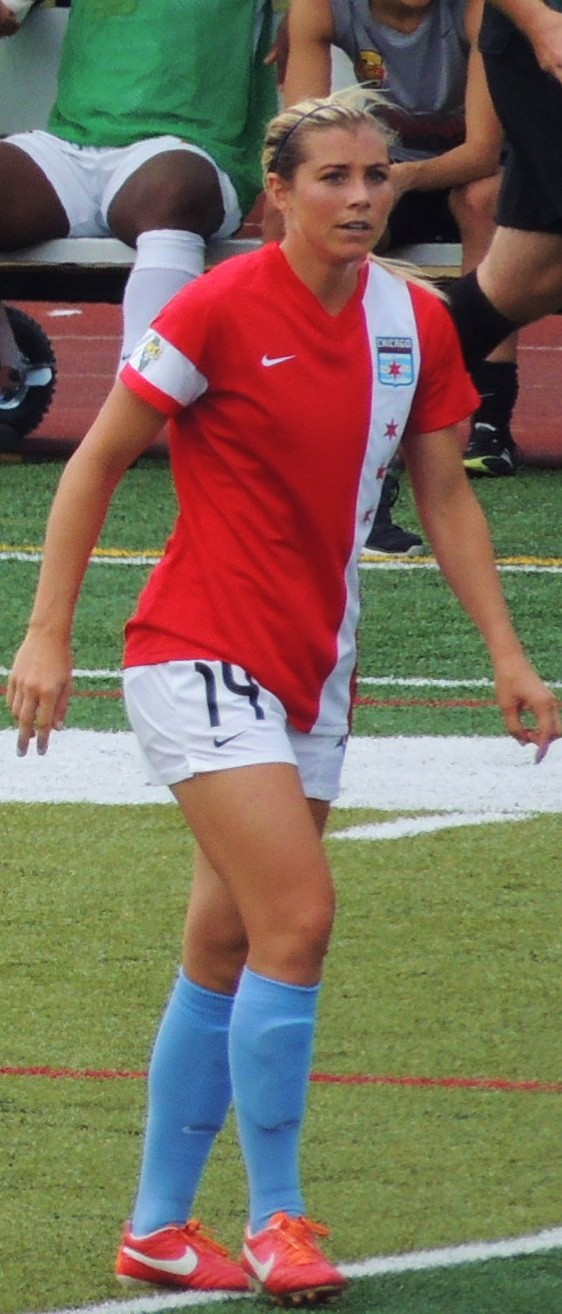

Personal information
- Full name: Taryn Elizabeth Hemmings
- Date of birth: April 26, 1986 (age 40)
- Place of birth: Greeley, Colorado, United States
- Height: 5 ft 8 in (1.73 m)
- Position: Defender

Youth career
- –2004: Real Colorado

College career
| Years | Team | Apps | (Gls) |
| 2004–2008 | Denver Pioneers | 79 | (42) |

Senior career*
| Years | Team | Apps | (Gls) |
| 2010–2012 | Boston Breakers | 29 | (0) |
| 2011–2012 | Canberra United | 10 | (4) |
| 2013–2015 | Chicago Red Stars | 47 | (1) |
| 2014 | → Fortuna Hjørring (loan) | | (0) |
| 2016 | Orlando Pride | 0 | (0) |
- * Club domestic league appearances and goals

Taryn Elizabeth Hemmings (born April 26, 1986) is an American former professional soccer defender.

== Early life ==
Hemmings grew up in Greeley, Colorado and attended Greeley West High School. During her junior and senior years, she led her high school team to the 2003 and 2004 back to back state championship's and won the 2004 Colorado State Cup Champions title's. She was named Colorado 4A player of the year in 2003. Hemmings was also named NSCAA adidas High School All-American in 2003. She was named MVP of the championship game both years.

=== University of Denver ===
Hemmings attended the University of Denver and played for the Pioneers from 2004 to 2008. She was named Comeback Player of the Year in 2008. In 2006 and 2008, she was also named Sun Belt Player of the Year, Sun Belt Tournament Most Outstanding Player. In 2006 and 2008, Hemmings was named to the Soccer Buzz All-Central Region First Team and NSCAA adidas All-Central Region Second Team. She ended her career as the Pioneers' second all-time career-scoring leader with 112 points and the leading scorer in NCAA Division 1 competition with 42 goals and 28 assists, tying the program's record for career goals and ranking third in career assists.

== Playing career ==
=== Club ===
In 2010, Hemmings was selected in the seventh round (65th overall) by the Boston Breakers in the 2010 Women's Professional Soccer (WPS) Draft. She started four of the 13 games she appeared in during the season, playing a total of 481 minutes.

In 2011, she started 10 of the 16 games she appeared in, logging a total of 893 minutes. Hemmings credits her father Bruce for her athletic ability and competitive drive.

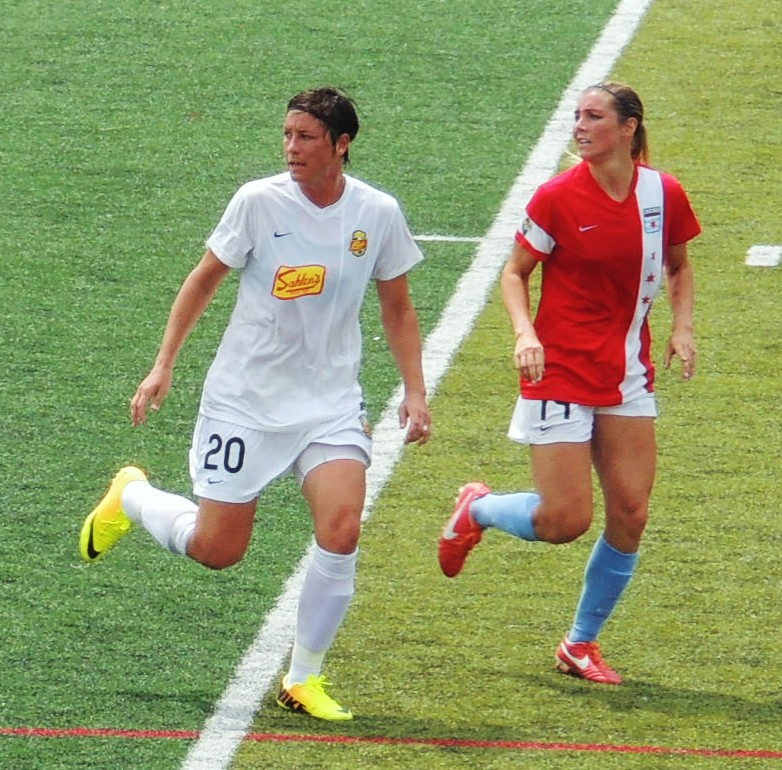
July 4, 2013; in Chicago Red Stars vs Western New York Flash, Abby Wambach-20 marked by Taryn Hemmings-14

During the 2011–2012 off-season, she joined Canberra United in Australia's W-League as both a forward and right back to win the Westfield W-League premiership and Grand Final. Hemmings made a total of 10 appearances with nine starts, and finished second on the team in goals scored with four. She was named Player of the Match twice, including the semi-final-round win over Melbourne Victory.

After the suspension of the Women's Professional Soccer league in early 2012, Hemmings was signed to the Boston Breakers in the WPSL Elite

On February 5, 2013, she joined Chicago Red Stars in the new National Women's Soccer League. On July 14, week 15 of the NWSL 2013 season, she injured her left knee, defending against FC Kansas City; and was out for the rest of the season.

On September 1, 2014, the Red Stars announced that Hemmings would be loaned to Fortuna Hjørring in Denmark.

On November 2, 2015, Hemmings was selected by the new NWSL club Orlando Pride in an expansion draft to play in 2016 season. However, before the start of the season, Hemmings decided to retire from professional soccer in March 2016.

Hemmings is now married to former NHL hockey player, Joe Colborne whom she met at the University of Denver where both were NCAA student-athletes.

== Business ventures ==
In 2015, alongside former professional soccer players Courtney Jones Louks, Lindsay Tarpley, Leslie Osborne, and Emily Hines, Hemmings founded Sweat Cosmetics, a company that produces makeup products for athletes.
