= Jackie Santacaterina =

American soccer player

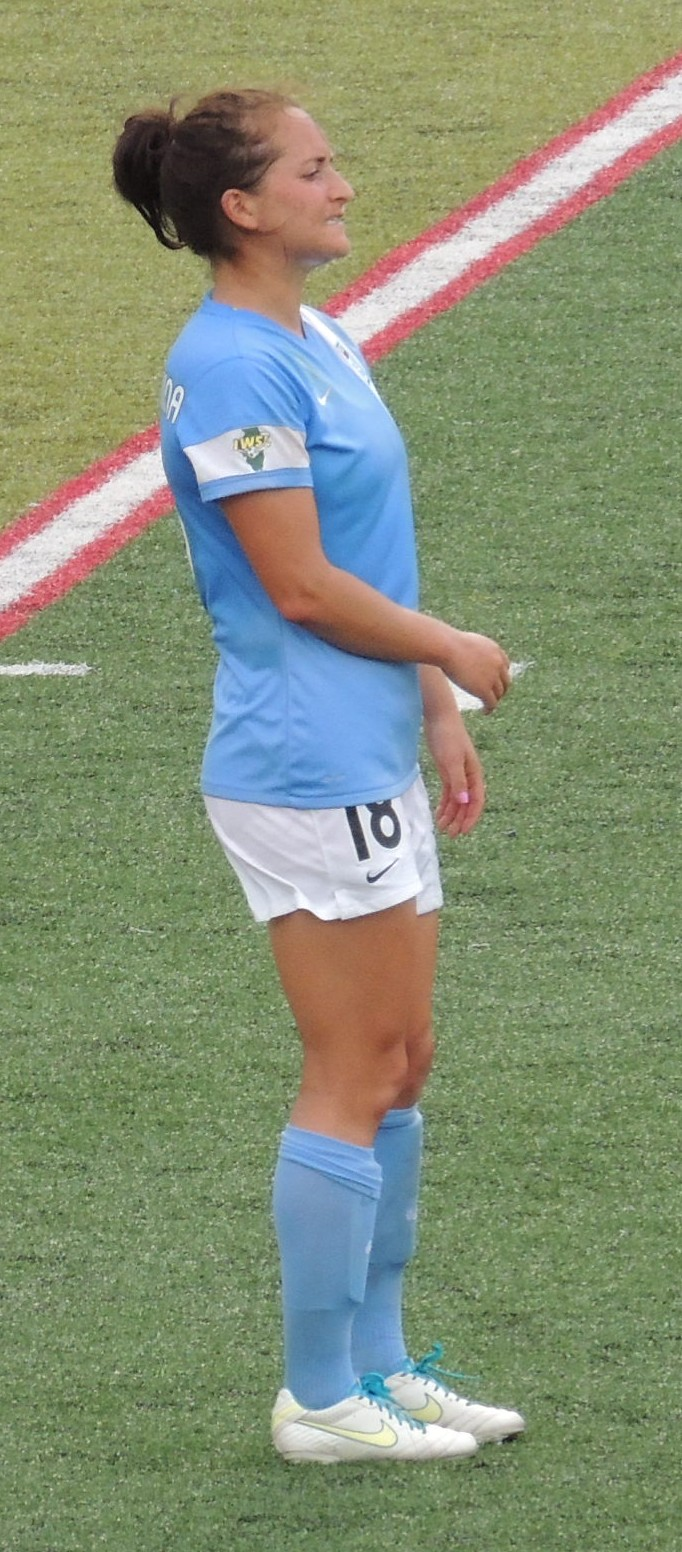
- Santacaterina with Chicago Red Stars in 2013

Personal information
- Full name: Jacqueline Manny
- Birth name: Jacqueline Santacaterina
- Date of birth: December 29, 1987 (age 38)
- Place of birth: Geneva, Illinois
- Height: 5 ft 8 in (1.73 m)
- Position: Defender

Youth career
- Eclipse Soccer Club

College career
Years	Team	Apps	(Gls)
2006–2009	Illinois Fighting Illini	84	(4)

Senior career*
Years	Team	Apps	(Gls)
2010	Chicago Red Stars (WPS)	1	(0)
2011	Chicago Red Stars (WPSL)		
2012	Chicago Red Stars (WPSLE)		
2013–2014	Chicago Red Stars (NWSL)	31	(3)
- * Club domestic league appearances and goals as of August 30, 2014

Jacqueline Manny (née Santacaterina; born December 29, 1987) is an American former professional soccer defender who last played for the Chicago Red Stars of the National Women's Soccer League.

== Early life ==
Santacaterina was raised in Geneva, Illinois, where she attended Geneva High School and finished her high school career with 49 goals and 47 assists in 70 games, all as midfielder for the Lady Vikings. In 2005, she helped lead Geneva to a third-place finish in Illinois class AA and was named Kane County Player of the Year. She earned Suburban Prairie North Conference MVP honors in 2004 and 2005 and was listed as a Top 150 recruit by Soccer Buzz.

Santacaterina helped lead the club soccer team, Eclipse Select, to consecutive United States Youth Soccer Association (USYSA) national championships in 2004 and 2005 followed by a Region II title in 2006. As a member of the Illinois state Olympic Development Program (ODP) team from 2000 to 2005, she helped guide the squad to a second-place national finish in 2005. Santacaterina also earned All-State honors in 2004 and 2005.

=== University of Illinois ===
Santacaterina attended the University of Illinois where she played for the Fighting Illini from 2006 to 2009. During her freshman year, she was named to the Big Ten All-Freshman team, Top Drawer Soccer's All-Rookie first team, Soccer Buzz's Great Lakes Region All-Freshman team and the All-Illini Tournament team. In 2007, she started in all 21 matches and was named to the Soccer Buzz All-Great Lakes Region second team and All-Big Ten second team. During her junior season, she started all 23 matches and was named to the All-Big Ten second team. During her final season, she was named team Co-MVP and was one of 11 Illini to register at least 1,000 minutes of play.

== Playing career ==
In 2013, Santacaterina was selected in the fourth round (28th overall) of the 2013 NWSL Supplemental Draft by the Chicago Red Stars for the inaugural season of the National Women's Soccer League.

Following the 2014 NWSL season, Santacaterina announced her retirement, citing inability to recover from a soccer injury.
