= Julianne Sitch =

American soccer player

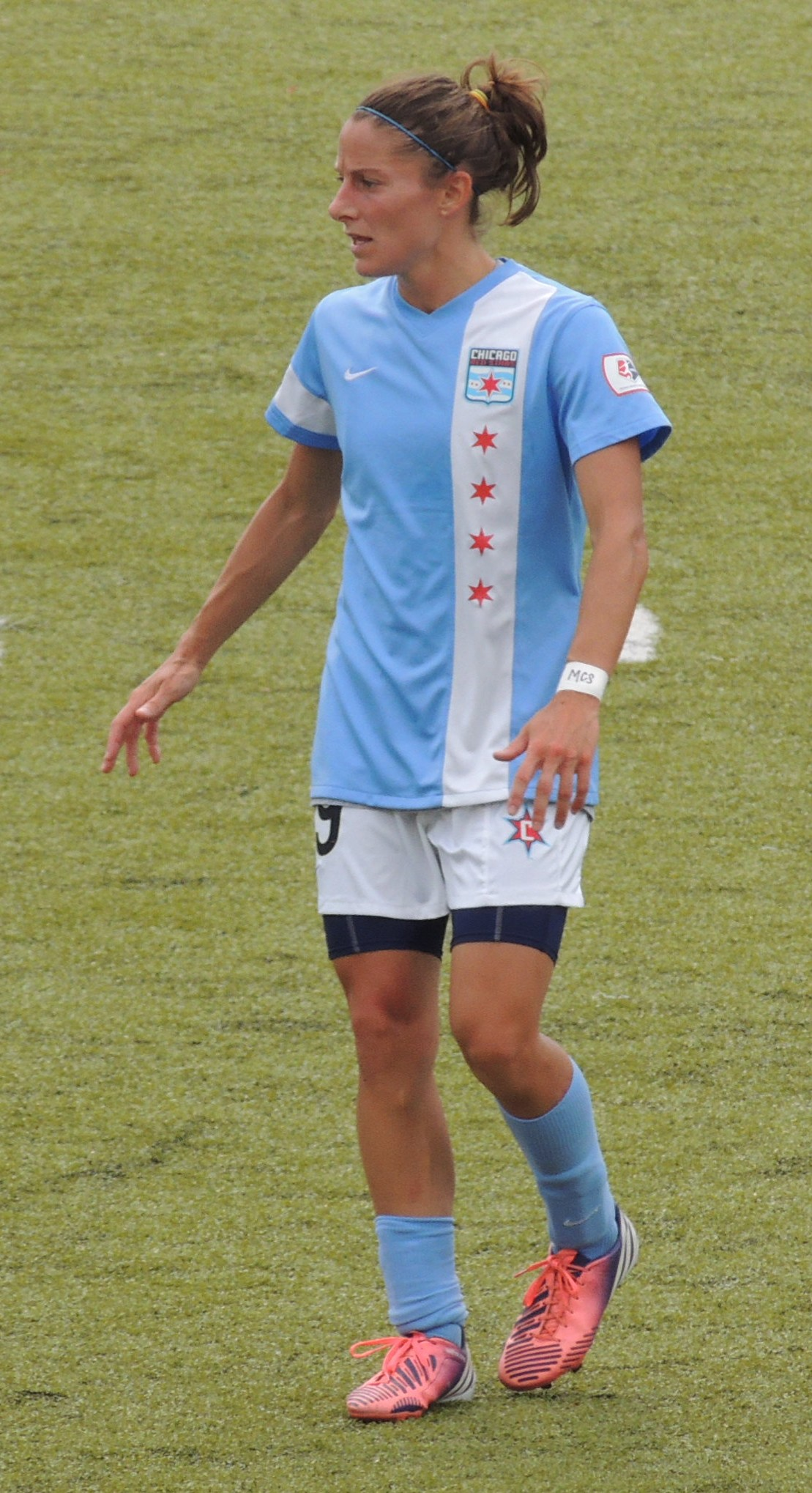
- Sitch playing for the Chicago Red Stars in June 2013

Personal information
- Full name: Julianne Marie Sitch
- Date of birth: September 18, 1983 (age 43)
- Place of birth: Oswego, Illinois, United States
- Height: 5 ft 3 in (1.60 m)
- Position: Defender

Team information
- Current team: Chicago Red Stars

College career
Years	Team	Apps	(Gls)
2002–2005	DePaul Blue Demons		

Senior career*
Years	Team	Apps	(Gls)
2001–2004	Chicago Cobras	29	(10)
2005	Hampton Roads Piranhas	12	(4)
2006	Bälinge IF		
2007	Chicago Gaels	11	(7)
2007–2008	F.C. Indiana	14	(10)
2009	Sky Blue FC	16	(1)
2009	Melbourne Victory	8	(1)
2010	Chicago Red Stars (WPS)	13	(0)
2011	Western New York Flash	0	(0)
2011	Atlanta Beat	2	(0)
2012	Chicago Red Stars (WPSLE)		
2012	Hammarby IF	8	(1)
2013–2014	Chicago Red Stars (NWSL)	31	(1)

International career
- United States U-19
- United States U-21

Managerial career
- 2015–2017: Chicago Maroons (assistant)
- 2018: UIC Flames (assistant)
- 2020–2022: Chicago Red Stars (assistant)
- 2020–2022: Chicago Red Stars Reserves
- 2022–: Chicago Maroons (men)
- 2023–: Denver Pioneers (women)
- * Club domestic league appearances and goals

Julianne Marie Sitch (born September 18, 1983) is an American former professional soccer defender. She is currently head coach of the University of Denver women's soccer team. She was previously a coach for the Chicago Red Stars and head coach of the University of Chicago men's soccer team. In 2022, she became the first woman in NCAA history to lead a men's team to a national championship.

== Early life ==
Born and raised in Oswego, Illinois, Sitch attended Oswego High School and played for the Region II Olympic Development Program.

=== DePaul University ===
Sitch attended DePaul University where she set career records in goals, assists, and points. In 2005, she ended her DePaul career as the program's all-time leading scorer with 32 goals and 26 assists.

== Club career ==
=== Melbourne Victory ===
In 2009, Sitch signed with the Melbourne Victory FC in Australia's W-League. She was voted team MVP.

=== Sky Blue FC ===
In 2009, Sitch played for Sky Blue FC during the inaugural season of the Women's Professional Soccer (WPS). She started 11 of 16 regular season games and scored one goal on June 28 during a match against the Saint Louis Athletica.

=== Chicago Red Stars (WPS) ===
Sitch signed with her hometown team, the Chicago Red Stars, for the 2010 WPS season. Of her signing, she was quoted, "I am very happy to be coming home to Chicago to continue my playing career. I've always dreamt about playing in my hometown, where all of my family and friends—who have supported me throughout my career—can come and watch. I love Chicago. I love Toyota Park and the energy it brings to the game. I couldn't be more happy." Sitch made 13 appearances for the Red Stars logging a total of 358 minutes.

=== Atlanta Beat ===
After the Chicago Red Stars ceased operations in the WPS and Sitch was briefly picked up by the Western New York Flash, Sitch signed with the Atlanta Beat of the WPS for the 2011 season. She made two appearances for the club, totaling 118 minutes.

=== Chicago Red Stars (WPSL Elite) ===
Sitch played for the Chicago Red Stars in the Women's Premier Soccer League Elite (WPSL-Elite) during the summer of 2012.

=== Hammarby IF ===
In 2012, Sitch spent a season with Hammarby IF and roomed with her Red Stars teammate, Lori Chalupny. She scored one goal and captained her team to promotion to the Damallsvenskan that season.

=== Chicago Red Stars (NWSL) ===
In 2013, Sitch returned to the Red Stars for the inaugural season of the National Women's Soccer League. She was waived by the Red Stars on July 31, 2014. She officially announced her retirement as an active player on April 9, 2015.

== International career ==
Sitch was a member of the United States U-21 women's national soccer team that won the Nordic Cup in 2004.

== Coaching career ==
Sitch served as an assistant coach for the Chicago Maroons women's soccer team at the University of Chicago from 2015 to 2017. She was an assistant coach for the UIC Flames from 2018 to 2019 before rejoining the Maroons women's soccer team as lead assistant coach and recruiting coordinator for the fall 2019 season.

In February 2020, Sitch returned to the Chicago Red Stars organization to serve as an assistant first-team coach and also as manager for the club's reserve team in the Women's Premier Soccer League (WPSL). The Red Stars Reserves won the 2021 Great Lakes Conference championship with a 7–1–2.

On April 20, 2022, Sitch was named the head coach of the Chicago Maroons men's soccer team. Sitch led the Maroons to an undefeated 22–0–1 record and its first national championship, the first won by a men's soccer team with a woman as head coach in any NCAA division. The team's only draw was against the NYU Violets led by Kim Wyant, which was reportedly also the first match between two NCAA men's soccer teams led by women head coaches. Wyant had been hired first, and Sitch called Wyant for advice before seeking the Maroons head coaching role.

On June 7, 2023, it was announced that Sitch would leave the University of Chicago to coach the Denver Pioneers of the University of Denver.
