= 2002 Philadelphia Charge season =

2002 season of American women's association football team

Philadelphia Charge
2002 season
- General manager: Tim Murphy
- Head coach: Mark Krikorian
- Stadium: Villanova Stadium
- WUSA: 2nd
- WUSA playoffs: Semi-finals
- Top goalscorer: Marinette Pichon (14)
- Highest home attendance: 9,650 (June 8 vs. Washington)
- Lowest home attendance: 5,402 (Aug 7 vs. San Jose)
- Average home league attendance: 6,880
- Biggest win: 4–2 (May 4 vs. Boston)
- Biggest defeat: 2–0 (two matches)

The 2002 season was the Philadelphia Charge's second season competing in the Women's United Soccer Association league, the top division of women's soccer in the United States, and second competitive season. The team was coached by Mark Krikorian.

== Club ==
=== Roster ===
The first-team roster of Philadelphia Charge.

Note: Flags indicate national team as defined under FIFA eligibility rules; some limited exceptions apply. Players may hold more than one non-FIFA nationality.

No.	Pos.	Nation	Player
—	MF	CHN	Liu Ailing
—	MF	USA	Andrea Alfiler
—	DF	USA	Jenny Benson
—	FW	USA	Mandy Clemens
—	MF	USA	Kerry Connors
—	MF	USA	Michelle Demko
—	MF	USA	Lorrie Fair
—	DF	USA	Karyn Hall
—	DF	USA	Erica Iverson
—	FW	USA	Rakel Karvelsson
—	FW	USA	Tara Koleski
—	MF	CHN	Zhao Lihong

No.	Pos.	Nation	Player
—	FW	USA	Erin Martin
—	MF	USA	Rebekah McDowell
—	DF	USA	Heather Mitts
—	MF	USA	Mary-Frances Monroe
—	GK	USA	Melissa Moore
—	FW	FRA	Marinette Pichon
—	GK	USA	Janel Schillig
—	MF	ENG	Kelly Smith
—	DF	USA	Jennifer Tietjen-Prozzo
—	DF	ENG	Stacey Tullock
—	GK	USA	Maite Zabala

=== Team management ===
Position	Staff Member
Head coach	(United States) Mark Krikorian
Assistant coach	(Sweden) Pia Sundhage
Assistant coach	(United States) John Natale
Goalkeeping coach	(United States) Paul Royal

Last updated: April 4, 2020

== Competition ==
=== Regular season ===
April 13 1	Atlanta Beat	0–2	Philadelphia Charge	Atlanta, GA
		Box Score	Smith 60'; Lihong 72'	Stadium: Herndon Stadium; Attendance: 10,070; Referee: Ricardo Salazar

April 27 2	New York Power	1–2	Philadelphia Charge	Uniondale, NY
	Janss 17'	Box Score	Monroe 32'; Smith 89'	Stadium: Mitchel Athletic Complex; Attendance: 4,203; Referee: Kim Oberle

May 4 3	Philadelphia Charge	4–2	Boston Breakers	Villanova, PA
	Tietjen-Prozzo 45'; Pichon 48'; Rooney 52' (o.g.); Clemens 82'	Box Score	Meinert 20'; Lilly 51'	Stadium: Villanova Stadium; Attendance: 6,629; Referee: Faith Rossi

May 11 4	Philadelphia Charge	3–1	Washington Freedom	Villanova, PA
	Martin 27', 39'; Smith 88'	Box Score	Wambach 88'	Stadium: Villanova Stadium; Attendance: 8,185; Referee: Sandra Hunt

May 19 5	San Diego Spirit	1–0	Philadelphia Charge	San Diego, CA
	Foudy 43'	Box Score		Stadium: Torero Stadium; Attendance: 5,779; Referee: Jesse Johnson

May 25 6	Carolina Courage	1–3	Philadelphia Charge	Cary, NC
	Slaton 56'	Box Score	Pichon 29', 82'; Smith 71'	Stadium: WakeMed Soccer Park; Attendance: 5,281; Referee: Kari Seitz Sarah Kraus

June 1 7	Philadelphia Charge	0–0	San Jose CyberRays	Villanova, PA
		Box Score		Stadium: Villanova Stadium; Attendance: 5,903; Referee: Misail Tsapos

June 8 8	Philadelphia Charge	1–1	Washington Freedom	Villanova, PA
	Pichon 87'	Box Score	Grubb 40'	Stadium: Villanova Stadium; Attendance: 9,650; Referee: Erich Simmons

June 15 9	Philadelphia Charge	1–0	Boston Breakers	Villanova, PA
	Pichon 5'	Box Score		Stadium: Villanova Stadium; Attendance: 5,465; Referee: Arnold Baldeaux

June 19 10	Carolina Courage	1–3	Philadelphia Charge	Cary, NC
	Pichon 5', 67'; Connors 39'	Box Score	Fotopoulos 27'	Stadium: WakeMed Soccer Park; Attendance: 5,244; Referee: Sandra Hunt

June 23 11	San Diego Spirit	1–1	Philadelphia Charge	San Diego, CA
	Yunjie 45' (o.g.)	Box Score	Ouying 49'	Stadium: Torero Stadium; Attendance: 5,545; Referee: Jesse Johnson

June 29 12	Philadelphia Charge	3–1	Atlanta Beat	Villanova, PA
	Pichon 32', 73'; Iverson 47'	Box Score	Wen 80'	Stadium: Villanova Stadium; Attendance: 6,844; Referee: Rachel Woo

July 7 13	Philadelphia Charge	3–1	New York Power	Villanova, PA
	Pichon 77', 79', 90'	Box Score	Davey 86'	Stadium: Villanova Stadium; Attendance: 6,303; Referee: Jennifer Bennett

July 14 14	Washington Freedom	1–1	Philadelphia Charge	Washington, DC
	Wambach 75'	Box Score	Lihong 85'	Stadium: RFK Stadium; Attendance: 5,968; Referee: Misail Tsapos

July 20 15	Philadelphia Charge	2–0	Carolina Courage	Villanova, PA
	Connors 21'; Pichon 25'	Box Score		Stadium: Villanova Stadium; Attendance: 6,946; Referee: Mark Arblaster

July 24 16	Philadelphia Charge	2–3	New York Power	Villanova, PA
	Clemens 61'; Ailing 79'	Box Score	Milbrett 83', 87'; Janss 84'	Stadium: Villanova Stadium; Attendance: 7,469; Referee: Todd Perry

July 27 17	Boston Breakers	1–1	Philadelphia Charge	Boston, MA
	Kemp 90'	Box Score	Ailing 84'	Stadium: Nickerson Field; Attendance: 6,017; Referee: Misail Tsapos

July 31 18	San Jose CyberRays	2–0	Philadelphia Charge	San Jose, CA
	Venturini-Hoch 54'; Kátia 84'	Box Score		Stadium: Spartan Stadium; Attendance: 6,653; Referee: Sandra Hunt

August 3 19	Philadelphia Charge	3–1	San Diego Spirit	Villanova, PA
	Tullock 56'; Iverson 65'; Pichon 71'	Box Score	Mascaro 58'	Stadium: Villanova Stadium; Attendance: 6,889; Referee: Terry Vaughn

August 7 20	Philadelphia Charge	1–1	San Jose CyberRays	Villanova, PA
	Tullock 73'	Box Score	Chastain 34'	Stadium: Villanova Stadium; Attendance: 5,402; Referee: Rachel Woo

August 10 21	Atlanta Beat	2–0	Philadelphia Charge	Atlanta, GA
	Serlenga 4'; Cagle 63'	Box Score		Stadium: Herndon Stadium; Attendance: 7,590; Referee: Erich Simmons

==== Results by round ====
Round	1	2	3	4	5	6	7	8	9	10	11	12	13	14	15	16	17	18	19	20	21
Ground	A	A	H	H	A	A	H	H	H	A	A	H	H	A	H	H	A	H	H	A	A
Result	W	W	W	W	L	W	D	D	W	W	D	W	W	D	W	L	D	L	W	D	L

Source: WUSA
A = Away; H = Home; W = Win; D = Draw; L = Loss

==== Home/away results ====
Overall								Home						Away					
Pld	W	D	L	GF	GA	GD	Pts	W	D	L	GF	GA	GD	W	D	L	GF	GA	GD
21	11	6	4	36	22	+14	39	7	3	1	23	11	+12	4	3	3	13	11	+2

Last updated: complete.
Source: WUSA

==== Regular-season standings ====
Pos	Team	Pld	W	D	L	GF	GA	GD	Pts	Qualification
1	Carolina Courage	21	12	4	5	40	30	+10	40	Regular Season Championship
2	Philadelphia Charge	21	11	6	4	36	22	+14	39	Qualification to play-offs
3	Washington Freedom	21	11	5	5	40	29	+11	38	Qualification to play-offs
4	Atlanta Beat	21	11	1	9	34	29	+5	34	Qualification to play-offs
5	San Jose CyberRays	21	8	5	8	34	30	+4	29	

Updated to match(es) played on August 2002. Source: statscrew.com and wusa.com

=== Playoffs ===
August 17 Semi-Finals	Philadelphia Charge	0–1	Washington Freedom	Villanova, PA
		Box Score	Gerardo 80'	Stadium: Villanova Stadium; Attendance: 6,547; Referee: Sandra Hunt

== Statistics ==
As of April 5, 2020

Players without any appearance are not included.

No.	Pos	Nat	Player	Total		WUSA		WUSA playoffs	
No.	Pos	Nat	Player	Apps	Goals	Apps	Goals	Apps	Goals
Goalkeepers:
	GK	(United States) USA	Melissa Moore	21	0	20	0	1	0
	GK	(United States) USA	Maite Zabala	1	0	1	0	0	0
Defenders:
	DF	(United States) USA	Andrea Alfiler	5	0	4+1	0	0	0
	DF	(United States) USA	Jenny Benson	20	0	18+1	0	1	0
	DF	(United States) USA	Karyn Hall	7	0	3+4	0	0	0
	DF	(United States) USA	Erica Iverson	20	2	19	2	1	0
	DF	(United States) USA	Heather Mitts	17	0	16	0	1	0
	MF	(United States) USA	Jennifer Tietjen-Prozzo	21	1	20	1	1	0
	DF	(England) ENG	Stacey Tullock	15	2	11+3	2	0+1	0
Midfielders:
	MF	(China) CHN	Liu Ailing	20	2	11+8	2	1	0
	MF	(United States) USA	Kerry Connors	19	2	15+3	2	1	0
	MF	(United States) USA	Michelle Demko	5	0	2+3	0	0	0
	MF	(United States) USA	Lorrie Fair	20	0	18+1	0	1	0
	MF	(China) CHN	Zhao Lihong	18	2	16+1	2	1	0
	MF	(United States) USA	Rebekah McDowell	13	0	7+5	0	0+1	0
	MF	(United States) USA	Mary-Frances Monroe	16	1	11+4	1	0+1	0
	MF	(England) ENG	Kelly Smith	7	4	7	4	0	0
Forwards:
	FW	(United States) USA	Mandy Clemens	18	2	11+7	2	0	0
	FW	(United States) USA	Erin Martin	11	2	5+6	2	0	0
	FW	(United States) USA	Tara Koleski	6	0	2+4	0	0	0
	FW	(France) FRA	Marinette Pichon	19	14	14+4	14	1	0

- Source: https://www.statscrew.com/womenssoccer/stats/t-WPHC/y-2002 StatsCrew.com

=== Goalkeepers ===
As of April 5, 2020

Nat.	No.	Player	Apps	Starts	Record	GA	GAA	SO	Booked	Sent off (straight red)
(United States)		Melissa Moore	20	20	11–3–6	20	1.00	4	0	0
(United States)		Maite Zabala	1	1	0–1–0	2	2.00	0	0	0
Total					11-4-6	22	1.05	4	0	0

Record = W-L-D

== Transfers ==
=== In ===
Date	Player	Position	Previous club	Fee/notes
December 5, 2001	(United States) Tracy Arkenberg	FW	(United States) San Diego Spirit	2001 WUSA waiver draft
December 5, 2001	(United States) Maite Zabala	GK	(United States) Atlanta Beat	2001 WUSA waiver draft
January 30, 2002	(China) Zhao Lihong	MF	China women's national football team	Signed
January 30, 2002	(United States) Marinette Pichon	FW	(France) Saint-Memmie Olympique	Signed
February 11, 2002	(United States) Stacey Tullock	DF	(United States) Arizona State	2002 WUSA draft, Round 1, Pick 5, 5th Overall
February 11, 2002	(United States) Mary-Frances Monroe	MF	(United States) UCLA	2002 WUSA draft, Round 2, Pick 5, 13th Overall
February 11, 2002	(United States) Andrea Alfiler	MF	(United States) Azusa Pacific	2002 WUSA draft, Round 2, Pick 8, 16th Overall
February 11, 2002	(United States) Katie Carson	GK	(United States) Clemson University	2002 WUSA draft, Round 3, Pick 5, 21st Overall
February 11, 2002	(United States) Kayrn Hall	DF	(United States) University of Florida	2002 WUSA draft, Round 4, Pick 5, 29th Overall
April 3, 2002	(United States) Janel Schillig	GK	(United States) Villanova University	Signed
July 9, 2002	(United States) Tara Koleski	FW	(United States) San Diego Spirit	Signed
	(United States) Kerry Connors	MF	(United States) New York Power	Signed

=== Out ===
Date	Player	Position	Destination club	Fee/notes
December 3, 2001	(United States) Laurie Pells	GK		Waived
December 3, 2001	(United States) Rakel Karvelsson	FW		Waived
December 3, 2001	(United States) Vanessa Rubio	DF		Waived
December 3, 2001	(United States) Courtney Saunders	FW		Waived
December 5, 2001	(United States) Saskia Webber	GK	(United States) New York Power	Trade
April 1, 2002	(United States) Laurie Schwoy	MF		Released
April 1, 2002	(United States) Katie Carson	GK		Released
April 1, 2002	(United States) Michelle Demko	MF		Released
May 16, 2002	(United States) Andrea Alfiler	DF	(United States) San Diego Spirit	Released
	(United States) Deidre Enos	FW	N/A	Retired
	(Germany) Doris Fitschen	DF	N/A	Retired
	(United States) Jennifer Soileau	MF	N/A	Retired

== Honors ==
2002 WUSA Most Valuable Player of the Year: (France) Marinette Pichon
2002 WUSA Offensive Player of the Year: (France) Marinette Pichon
2002 All-WUSA Team: (France) Marinette Pichon, (United States) Jennifer Tietjen-Prozzo, (United States) Erica Iverson,
2002 WUSA Coach of the Year: (United States) Mark Krikorian
