= 2001 Philadelphia Charge season =

American women's soccer team season

Philadelphia Charge
2001 season
- General manager: Tim Murphy
- Head coach: Mark Krikorian
- Stadium: Villanova Stadium
- WUSA: 4th
- WUSA PLayoffs: Semi-finals
- Top goalscorer: Liu Ailing (10)
- Highest home attendance: 11,800 (June 3 vs. Washington)
- Lowest home attendance: 4,756 (July 19 vs. Boston)
- Average home league attendance: 7,153
- Biggest win: 5–1 (Aug 6 vs. Carolina)
- Biggest defeat: 0–3 (June 20 vs. Bay Area)

The 2001 season was the Philadelphia Charge's first season competing in the Women's United Soccer Association league, the top division of women's soccer in the United States, and first competitive season. The team was coached by Mark Krikorian.

== Review ==
=== Team formation ===
After establishing the team in November 2000, the inaugural roster for the Philadelphia Charge began to form through a series of drafts organized by WUSA. All eight teams first participated in the WUSA player allocation intended to distribute top players, notably from the American team that won the 1999 FIFA Women's World Cup the previous year. The Charge were first allocated US international midfielder Lorrie Fair, being the team's first official player. Goalkeeper, Saskia Webber, and forward, Mandy Clemens finished out the initial allocation for the 2001 season.

After distribution of domestic talent, WUSA hosted the WUSA foreign player allocation, assigning rights of foreign players amongst the eight teams. The Charge drafted German international defender Doris Fitschen and English midfielder Kelly Smith, both signed before the start of the season.

With domestic and international talent allocated, the Charge announced in November 2000 that University of Hartford women's soccer coach, Mark Krikorian, would be appointed the first head coach of the team. Prior to the start of the season, Krikorian would bring on former Swedish international Pia Sundhage and John Natale as assistant coaches. Rosters were filled out in December 2000, where the league hosted the first WUSA Draft Notable acquisitions for the Charge included Chinese international midfielder, Liu Ailing, US international defender, Heather Mitts, and US international midfielder Laurie Schwoy.

=== First season ===
The Charge played their first match in team history away at San Diego Spirit earning their first win. The team's first goal was a penalty kick scored by Doris Fitschen, followed up by a 62nd minute goal from Kelly Smith. The Charge would finish their first season 4th in the standings, securing the final spot in the first WUSA Playoffs. On August 18, the Charge played their post season match at Atlanta Beat, losing in extra time 3-2, Philadelphia goals scored by Kelly Smith and Mandy Clemens.

Liu Ailing emerged as the primary scoring threat for the Charge, scoring 10 goals in the regular season from 19 starts and registering the team's first hattrick against Carolina Courage.

== Club ==
=== Roster ===
The first-team roster of Philadelphia Charge.

Note: Flags indicate national team as defined under FIFA eligibility rules; some limited exceptions apply. Players may hold more than one non-FIFA nationality.

No.	Pos.	Nation	Player
—	MF	CHN	Liu Ailing
—	DF	USA	Jenny Benson
—	FW	USA	Mandy Clemens
—	MF	USA	Michelle Demko
—	FW	USA	Deidre Enos
—	MF	USA	Lorrie Fair
—	DF	GER	Doris Fitschen
—	DF	USA	Erica Iverson
—	MF	USA	Kalli Kamholz
—	FW	ISL	Rakel Karvelsson
—	FW	USA	Erin Martin
—	MF	USA	Rebekah McDowell

No.	Pos.	Nation	Player
—	DF	USA	Heather Mitts
—	GK	USA	Melissa Moore
—	MF	ISL	Margret Olafsdottir
—	GK	USA	Laurie Pells
—	DF	USA	Vanessa Rubio
—	FW	USA	Courtney Saunders
—	MF	USA	Laurie Schwoy
—	MF	ENG	Kelly Smith
—	MF	USA	Jennifer Soileau
—	DF	USA	Jennifer Tietjen-Prozzo
—	GK	USA	Saskia Webber

=== Team management ===
Position	Staff Member
Head coach	(United States) Mark Krikorian
Assistant coach	(Sweden) Pia Sundhage
Assistant coach	(United States) John Natale

Last updated: April 3, 2020

== Competition ==
=== Regular season ===
April 22 1	San Diego Spirit	0–2	Philadelphia Charge	San Diego, CA
		Box Score	Fitschen 30' (pen.); Smith 62'	Stadium: Torero Stadium; Attendance: 6,155; Referee: Kari Seitz

April 28 2	Atlanta Beat	0–0	Philadelphia Charge	Atlanta, GA
		Box Score		Stadium: Bobby Dodd Stadium; Attendance: 11,228; Referee: Nancy Lay

May 6 3	Philadelphia Charge	3–2	Bay Area CyberRays	Villanova, PA
	Martin 32'; Olafsdottir 66'; Demko 79'	Box Score	Murray 33'; Sissi 66'	Stadium: Villanova Stadium; Attendance: 11,092; Referee: Todd Perry

May 13 4	New York Power	2–2	Philadelphia Charge	Uniondale, NY
	Milbrett 54'; Connors 58'	Box Score	McDowell 62'; Karvelsson 80'	Stadium: Mitchel Athletic Complex; Attendance: 2,348; Referee: Jennifer Bennett

May 24 5	Philadelphia Charge	0–2	Atlanta Beat	Villanova, PA
		Box Score	Parlow 2'; Miller 40'	Stadium: Villanova Stadium; Attendance: 6,432; Referee: Sandra Hunt

May 27 6	Boston Breakers	2–3	Philadelphia Charge	Boston, MA
	Mellgren 2'; Meinert 81'	Report	Ailing 36', 77'; Schwoy 83'	Stadium: Nickerson Field

May 31 7	Washington Freedom	0–2	Philadelphia Charge	Washington, D.C.
		Box Score	Clemens 20'; Ailing 51'	Stadium: RFK Stadium; Attendance: 6,396; Referee: Rachel Woo

June 3 8	Philadelphia Charge	1–2	Washington Freedom	Villanova, PA
	Ailing 2'	Box Score	Grubb 32'; Pretinha 49'	Stadium: Villanova Stadium; Attendance: 11,800; Referee: Peter Kokolski

June 10 9	Philadelphia Charge	3–0	Carolina Courage	Villanova, PA
	Smith 16'; Clemens 67'; Schwoy 74' (pen.)	Box Score		Stadium: Villanova Stadium; Attendance: 5,862; Referee: Faith Rossi

June 17 10	New York Power	2–1	Philadelphia Charge	Uniondale, NY
	Milbrett 15', 25'	Box Score	Ailing 60'	Stadium: Mitchel Athletic Complex; Attendance: 3,104; Referee: Irwin Medina

June 20 11	Bay Area CyberRays	3–0	Philadelphia Charge	San Jose, CA
	Kátia 48'; Murray 50', 77'	Box Score		Stadium: Spartan Stadium; Attendance: 4,687; Referee: Kari Seitz

July 1 12	Philadelphia Charge	1–1	Atlanta Beat	Villanova, PA
	Ailing 90+'	Box Score	Sawa 86'	Stadium: Villanova Stadium; Attendance: 6,185; Referee: Kari Seitz

July 7 13	Carolina Courage	2–0	Philadelphia Charge	Chapel Hill, NC
	Fotopoulos 4'; Riise 84'	Box Score		Stadium: Fetzer Field; Attendance: 5,758; Referee: Nancy Lay

July 13 14	Philadelphia Charge	3–0	San Diego Spirit	Villanova, PA
	Fitschen 21', 57'; Ailing 78'	Box Score		Stadium: Villanova Stadium; Attendance: 5,683; Referee: Terry Vaughn

July 19 15	Philadelphia Charge	1–2	Boston Breakers	Villanova, PA
	Smith 77'	Box Score	Mellgren 52', 85'	Stadium: Villanova Stadium; Attendance: 4,756; Referee: Faith Rossi

July 26 16	Washington Freedom	0–2	Philadelphia Charge	Washington, D.C.
		Box Score	Demko 44'; Enos 78'	Stadium: RFK Stadium; Attendance: 6,794; Referee: Todd Perry

July 30 17	Philadelphia Charge	2–1	New York Power	Villanova, PA
	Clemens 56'; Schwoy 90+'	Box Score	Millbrett 34'	Stadium: Villanova Stadium; Attendance: 6,588; Referee: Jennifer Bennett

August 2 18	Bay Area CyberRays	3–2	Philadelphia Charge	San Jose, CA
	Murray 51', 55'; Kátia 62'	Box Score	Olafsdottir 52'; Fair 90+'	Stadium: Spartan Stadium; Attendance: 7,670; Referee: Ricardo Salazar

August 6 19	Philadelphia Charge	5–1	Carolina Courage	Villanova, PA
	Ailing 14', 37', 43'; Clemens 48', 59'	Box Score	Riise 53'	Stadium: Villanova Stadium; Attendance: 6,078; Referee: Sandra Hunt

August 9 20	Philadelphia Charge	1–1	San Diego Spirit	Villanova, PA
	Smith 75'	Box Score	Koleski 47'	Stadium: Villanova Stadium; Attendance: 7,065; Referee: Rachel Woo

August 12 21	Boston Breakers	2–1	Philadelphia Charge	Boston, MA
	Mellgren 54'; Raygor 59'	Box Score	Schwoy 69'	Stadium: Nickerson Field; Attendance: 6,075; Referee: Jennifer Bennett

==== Results by round ====
Round	1	2	3	4	5	6	7	8	9	10	11	12	13	14	15	16	17	18	19	20	21
Stadium	A	A	H	A	H	A	A	H	H	A	A	H	A	H	H	A	H	A	H	H	A
Result	W	D	W	D	L	W	W	L	W	L	L	D	L	W	L	W	W	L	W	D	L

Source: WUSA
A = Away; H = Home; W = Win; D = Draw; L = Loss

==== Home/away results ====
Overall								Home						Away					
Pld	W	D	L	GF	GA	GD	Pts	W	D	L	GF	GA	GD	W	D	L	GF	GA	GD
21	9	4	8	35	28	+7	31	5	2	3	20	13	+7	4	2	5	15	15	0

Last updated: complete.
Source: WUSA

==== Regular-season standings ====
Pos	Team	Pld	W	D	L	GF	GA	GD	Pts	Qualification
2	Bay Area CyberRays	21	11	4	6	27	23	+4	37	Qualification to play-offs
3	New York Power	21	9	5	7	30	25	+5	32	Qualification to play-offs
4	Philadelphia Charge	21	9	4	8	35	28	+7	31	Qualification to play-offs
5	San Diego Spirit	21	7	7	7	29	28	+1	28	
6	Boston Breakers	21	8	3	10	29	35	−6	27	

Updated to match(es) played on August 2001. Source:

=== Playoffs ===
August 18 Semi-Finals	Atlanta Beat	3–2	Philadelphia Charge	Atlanta, GA
	Smith 33'; Clemens 36'	Box Score	Sun Wen 67' (pen.); Parlow 79', 101'	Stadium: Bobby Dodd Stadium; Attendance: 12,138; Referee: Ricardo Salazar

== Statistics ==
As of April 2, 2020

Players without any appearance are not included.

No.	Pos	Nat	Player	Total		WUSA		WUSA Playoffs	
No.	Pos	Nat	Player	Apps	Goals	Apps	Goals	Apps	Goals
Goalkeepers:
	GK	(United States) USA	Melissa Moore	11	0	10	0	1	0
	GK	(United States) USA	Saskia Webber	12	0	12	0	0	0
Defenders:
	DF	(United States) USA	Jenny Benson	21	0	20	0	1	0
	DF	(Germany) GER	Doris Fitschen	13	3	13	3	0	0
	DF	(United States) USA	Erica Iverson	5	0	4	0	1	0
	DF	(United States) USA	Heather Mitts	21	0	20	0	1	0
	MF	(United States) USA	Jennifer Tietjen-Prozzo	19	0	18	0	1	0
Midfielders:
	MF	(China) CHN	Liu Ailing	20	10	19	10	1	0
	MF	(United States) USA	Michelle Demko	17	2	10+6	2	1	0
	MF	(United States) USA	Lorrie Fair	17	1	14+2	1	1	0
	MF	(United States) USA	Kalli Kamholz	12	0	7+5	0	0	0
	MF	(United States) USA	Rebekah McDowell	20	1	15+4	1	0+1	0
	MF	(Iceland) ISL	Margret Olafsdottir	18	2	10+8	2	0	0
	MF	(United States) USA	Laurie Schwoy	18	4	9+8	4	0+1	0
	MF	(England) ENG	Kelly Smith	14	5	12+1	4	1	1
	MF	(United States) USA	Jennifer Soileau	6	0	1+5	0	0	0
Forwards:
	FW	(United States) USA	Mandy Clemens	21	6	13+7	5	1	1
	FW	(United States) USA	Deidre Enos	20	1	4+15	1	0+1	0
	FW	(Iceland) ISL	Rakel Karvelsson	18	1	13+4	1	1	0
	FW	(United States) USA	Erin Martin	10	1	8+2	1	0	0

- Source: https://www.statscrew.com/womenssoccer/stats/t-WPHC/y-2001

=== Goalkeepers ===
As of April 4, 2020

Nat.	No.	Player	Apps	Starts	Record	GA	GAA	SO	Booked	Sent off (straight red)
(United States)		Melissa Moore	10	10	5–3–1	10	1.00	3	0	0
(United States)		Saskia Webber	12	12	4–5–3	18	1.50	3	0	0
Total					9-8-4	28	1.33	6	0	0

Record = W-L-D

== Transfers ==
=== In ===
Date	Player	Position	Previous club	Fee/notes
May 24, 2000	(United States) Lorrie Fair	MF	(United States) North Carolina Tar Heels	WUSA player allocation
May 24, 2000	(United States) Saskia Webber	GK	(Japan) OKI F.C. Winds	WUSA player allocation
May 24, 2000	(United States) Mandy Clemens	FW	(United States) Silicon Valley Red Devils	WUSA player allocation
October 30, 2000	(Germany) Doris Fitschen	DF	(Germany) 1. FFC Frankfurt	WUSA foreign player allocation
October 30, 2000	(England) Kelly Smith	FW	(United States) New Jersey Lady Stallions	WUSA foreign player allocation
December 10, 2000	(China) Liu Ailing	MF	China National Team	2000 WUSA Draft, Round 1, Pick 2, 2nd Overall
December 10, 2000	(United States) Heather Mitts	DF	(United States) Tampa Bay Extreme	2000 WUSA Draft, Round 2, Pick 7, 15th Overall
December 10, 2000	(United States) Jenny Benson	MF	(United States) Nebraska Cornhuskers	2000 WUSA Draft, Round 3, Pick 2, 18th Overall
December 10, 2000	(United States) Ruth Van't Land	FW	(United States) Cal Poly Pomona Broncos	2000 WUSA Draft, Round 4, Pick 6, 31st Overall
December 10, 2000	(United States) Sarah Yohe	FW	(United States) Florida Gators	2000 WUSA Draft, Round 5, Pick 2, 34th Overall
December 10, 2000	(United States) Raven McDonald	MF	(United States) North Carolina Tar Heels	2000 WUSA Draft, Round 6, Pick 7, 47th Overall
December 10, 2000	(United States) Rebekah McDowell	MF	(United States) North Carolina Tar Heels	2000 WUSA Draft, Round 7, Pick 1, 49th Overall
December 10, 2000	(United States) Michelle Demko	MF	(United States) Tampa Bay Extreme	2000 WUSA Draft, Round 8, Pick 7, 63rd Overall
December 11, 2000	(United States) Kalli Kamholz	MF	(United States) Tampa Bay Extreme	2000 WUSA Draft, Round 9, Pick 2, 66th Overall
December 11, 2000	(United States) Carly Smolak	GK		2000 WUSA Draft, Round 10, Pick 2, 79th Overall
December 11, 2000	(United States) Jennifer Tietjen-Prozzo	DF	(United States) Lond Island Lady Riders	2000 WUSA Draft, Round 11, Pick 2, 82nd Overall
December 11, 2000	(United States) Erin Martin	FW	(United States) Three Kings United	2000 WUSA Draft, Round 12, Pick 7, 95th Overall
December 11, 2000	(United States) Beth Keller	FW	(United States) Chicago Cobras	2000 WUSA Draft, Round 13, Pick 2, 98th Overall
December 11, 2000	(United States) Laurie Schwoy	MF		2000 WUSA Draft, Round 14, Pick 7, 111th Overall
December 11, 2000	(Mexico) Laurie Hill	MF	(United States) California Storm	2000 WUSA Draft, Round 15, Pick 2, 114th Overall
March 30, 2001	(United States) Jennifer Soileau	MF	(United States) Ole Miss Rebels	Signed
April 3, 2001	(United States) Deidre Enos	FW	(United States) Boston University Terriers	Signed
April 13, 2001	(Iceland) Margret Olafsdottir	MF	(Iceland) Breiðablik	Signed
	(United States) Erica Iverson	DF		Signed
	(United States) Rakel Karvelsson	FW		Signed
	(United States) Melissa Moore	GK		Signed

=== Out ===
Date	Player	Position	Destination club	Fee/notes
March 21, 2000	(United States) Laurie Pells	GK		Waived
March 21, 2000	(United States) Angela Harrison			Waived
March 21, 2000	(United States) Tracey Spinelli			Waived
March 21, 2000	(United States) Beth Keller	MF	(United States) Carolina Courage	Waived
March 21, 2000	(United States) Courtney Saunders			Waived
March 21, 2000	(Mexico) Laurie Hill	MF		Released

== Honors ==
2001 WUSA Defensive Player of the Year: (Germany) Doris Fitschen
