= 2002 WUSA All-Star Game =

- Event: 2002 Women's United Soccer Association season
WUSA South	WUSA North
(United States)	(United States)
6	1
- Date: September 21, 2002
- Venue: PGE Park, Portland, Oregon
- Player of the Match: Abby Wambach (WUSA South)
- Referee: Kari Seitz
- Attendance: 14,208
- Weather: Sunshine, clear 73 °F (23 °C)

The 2002 WUSA All-Star Game (known as the 2002 WUSA All-Star Game presented by Hyundai for sponsorship reasons) was the first Women's United Soccer Association All-Star Game, a soccer match involving all-stars from Women's United Soccer Association (WUSA). Two teams comprised the best players from all eight league franchises met at PGE Park, Portland, Oregon, on September 21, 2002. The WUSA All-Stars South won the game 6–1, with goals from Abby Wambach (2), Hege Riise, Kylie Bivens, Charmaine Hooper and Shannon MacMillan, while Marinette Pichon scored for the WUSA All-Stars North. WUSA All-Stars South forward Abby Wambach was named as the game's Most Valuable Player. Kari Seitz refereed the game, which was attended by 14,208 spectators and broadcast live on PAX TV.

== Format ==
For the inaugural staging of the All-star match, the eight WUSA franchises were divided geographically into a WUSA North selection (made up of players from Boston Breakers, New York Power, Philadelphia Charge and San Jose CyberRays) and a WUSA South selection (with players from Atlanta Beat, Carolina Courage, San Diego Spirit and Washington Freedom).

Starting line-ups for the two teams were announced on September 4, 2002 and reserve players on September 9, 2002. The selection formula for the starting line-ups had four elements, each with a 25% weighting: a fan vote, a WUSA player vote, an owner/GM vote and a journalist/media vote. The additional five reserve players were selected directly by the team coaches and WUSA Commissioner Tony DiCicco.

DiCicco had also selected the team coaches, based on the performance of their clubs in the 2002 WUSA regular season. Marcia McDermott was named South head coach, with Jim Gabarra as her assistant, while Mark Krikorian took charge of the North team, assisted by Ian Sawyers. Gabarra replaced Tom Stone, who was initially picked as McDermott's assistant.

The exhibition was played as two 40-minute halves, with free substitution.

An informal WUSA All-Star game had taken place at the 2002 WUSA draft in February 2002 in Fort Lauderdale, Florida. Also played with North/South select teams, the WUSA South won 4–3 on that occasion. Homare Sawa, Charmaine Hooper, Cindy Parlow and Shannon MacMillan scored for WUSA South, while Tiffeny Milbrett, Kristy Whelchel and Mandy Clemens replied for WUSA North. The match was marred by a serious injury to Sara Whalen.

== Venue ==
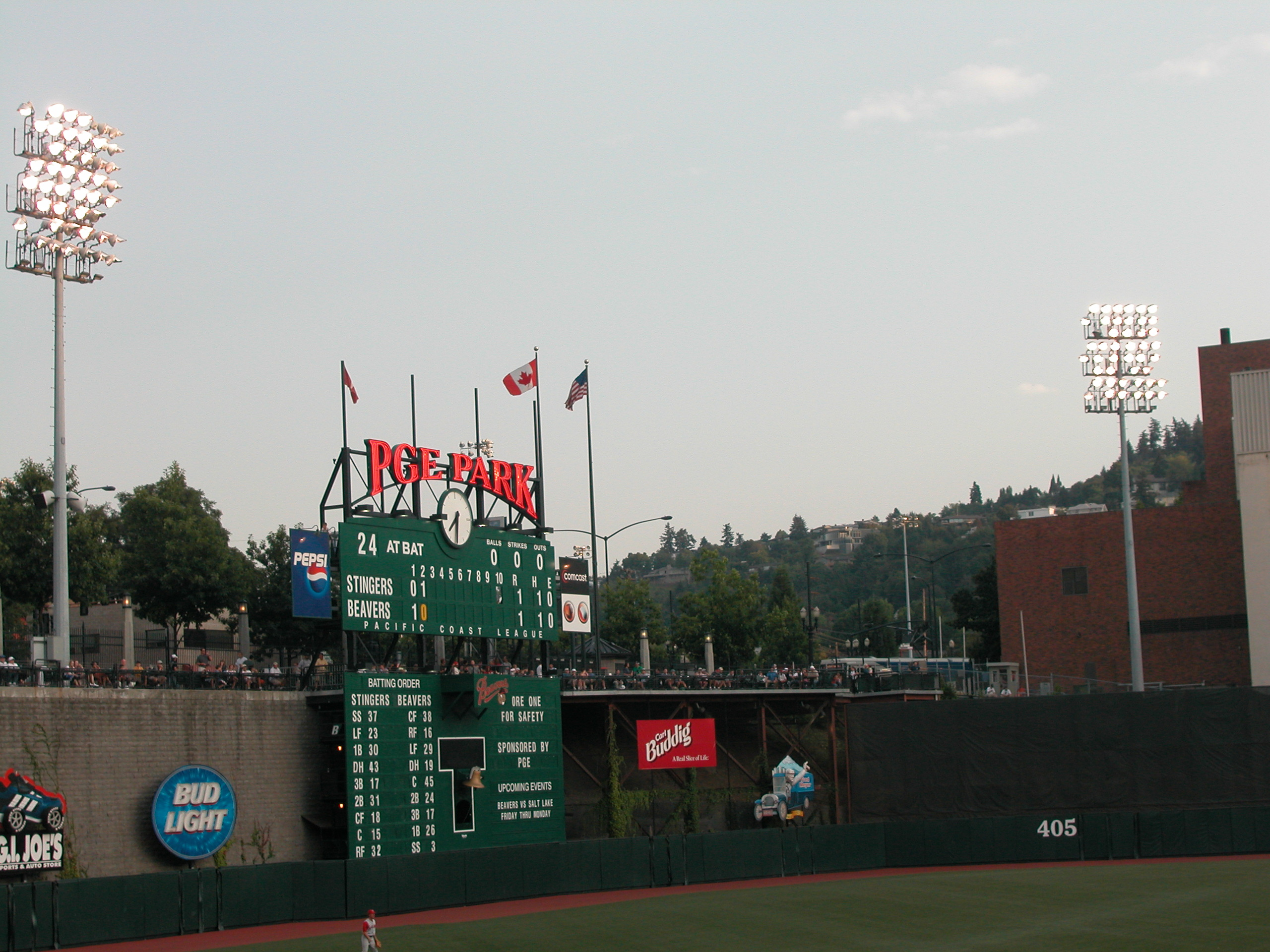
PGE Park in Portland, OR, hosted the match.

Portland (sometimes called "Soccer City") was chosen as the venue in a bid to capitalise on the popularity of the sport in the area. It was hoped this would lead to a boost in WUSA's television ratings in the local market and, although there were no immediate plans for a WUSA expansion team in Portland, it was under consideration for the future. (Note: WUSA folded before expanding to Portland, but a National Women's Soccer League (NWSL) franchise, Portland Thorns FC, began play 10 years later. With PGE Park as their home ground they became successful and enjoyed the highest average attendances of any women's soccer club in the world.)

Portland Pilots college soccer alumni Tiffeny Milbrett and Shannon MacMillan were named captains of the respective teams. Their former college coach Clive Charles performed the pre-match coin toss. Charles had terminal prostate cancer and had collected a WUSA lifetime achievement award at an All-Star Gala held two days earlier at the Multnomah Athletic Club.

Organizers were happy with the attendance of 14,208. WUSA's official website reported the figure as a record attendance since PGE Park's 2000–01 renovations, although The Oregonian newspaper reported it as the third largest behind two baseball games.

== Match ==
=== Summary ===
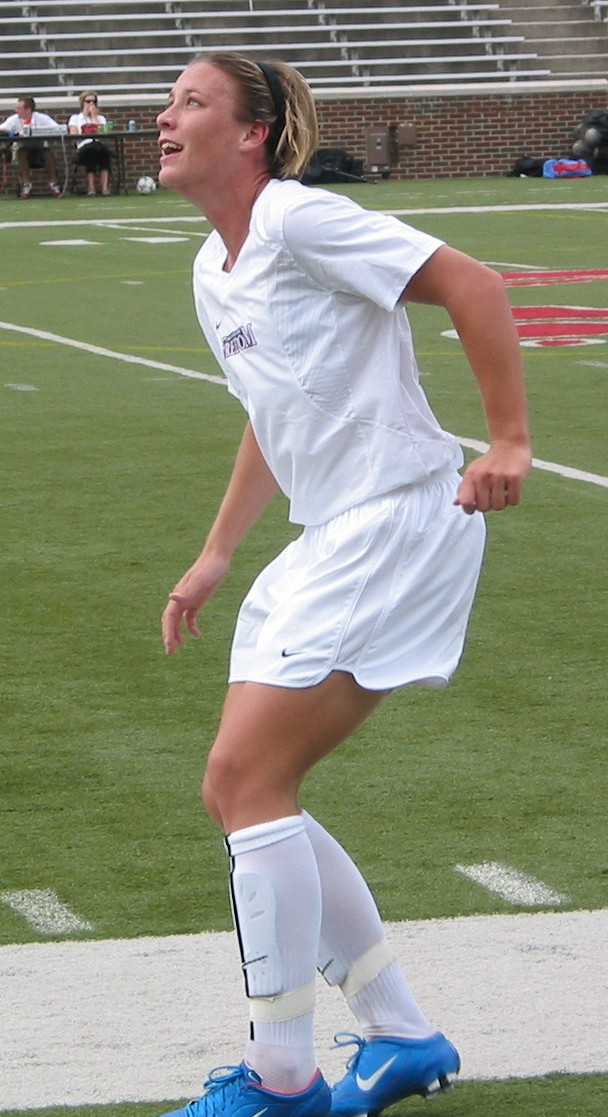
Washington Freedom forward Abby Wambach scored two goals and was named the match's most valuable player.

Kristine Lilly withdrew from the match at late notice when she was bereaved by the death of her grandmother, being replaced in the WUSA North starting line-up by Kate Sobrero. Birgit Prinz was voted into the WUSA South selection but was unable to take part as she was on loan to her German club FFC Frankfurt, who were competing in the 2002–03 UEFA Women's Cup qualifying round in Yugoslavia. Shannon MacMillan was elevated from the reserve to starting roster to replace her.

In the tradition of North American All-star games, the match was played at a sedate pace. Referee Kari Seitz called only three fouls and showed no yellow or red cards. The Associated Press report described play as "a bit sloppy", noting that the players were almost one month into their off-season, and that the artificial turf surface at PGE Park was somewhat unsuitable.

On 12 minutes Marinette Pichon scored with WUSA North's first chance, turning and hitting a powerful 15-yard shot into the goal. Nine minutes later Hege Riise equalized from Mia Hamm's pass, and thereafter the WUSA South team took control of the match. Abby Wambach shot past goalkeeper Melissa Moore to score her first goal on 24 minutes. One minute before half-time Kylie Bivens headed in Hamm's cross to give WUSA South a two-goal advantage at the interval.

Wambach chipped in her second goal on the hour mark, then turned provider for Charmaine Hooper who shot past LaKeysia Beene on 66 minutes. In the final minute Shannon MacMillan's shot went in off the post to make the final score 6–1 to WUSA South. 2002 WUSA Rookie of the Year Wambach's two goals and one assist saw her named the MVP.

=== Details ===
2002 Women's United Soccer Association All-Star Game
September 21, 2002
4:00 p.m. EDT

WUSA South (United States)	6–1	(United States) WUSA North
Riise 21'; Wambach 24', 60'; Bivens 39'; Hooper 66'; MacMillan 80'	Report; Numerical rosters	Pichon 12'

PGE Park, Portland, Or.
Attendance: 14,208
Referee: Kari Seitz

South	North

GK	2	(United States) Kristin Luckenbill
DF	5	(United States) Tiffany Roberts
DF	14	(United States) Joy Fawcett
DF	12	(United States) Jennifer Grubb
DF	17	(United States) Danielle Slaton
MF	11	(United States) Julie Foudy
MF	8	(United States) Shannon MacMillan
MF	10	(Norway) Hege Riise
MF	6	(Japan) Homare Sawa
FW	28	(United States) Abby Wambach
FW	9	(United States) Mia Hamm
Substitutions:
GK	1	(United States) Briana Scurry
DF	13	(United States) Nel Fettig
DF	7	(United States) Carrie Moore
MF	4	(United States) Kylie Bivens
FW	16	(Canada) Charmaine Hooper
Coach:
(United States) Marcia McDermott

GK	1	(United States) Melissa Moore
DF	6	(United States) Brandi Chastain
DF	17	(United States) Kate Sobrero
DF	25	(United States) Jennifer Tietjen
DF	5	(United States) Jenny Benson
MF	2	(United States) Lorrie Fair
MF	16	(United States) Tisha Venturini-Hoch
MF	10	(Brazil) Sissi
FW	9	(Brazil) Kátia
FW	11	(France) Marinette Pichon
FW	15	(United States) Tiffeny Milbrett
Substitutions:
GK	00	(United States) LaKeysia Beene
DF	14	(United States) Erica Iverson
MF	12	(United States) Angela Hucles
MF	4	(Germany) Maren Meinert
Coach:
(United States) Mark Krikorian

Most Valuable Player:
(United States) Abby Wambach (WUSA South)

Assistant referees:
Emiliano Monje
Fabio Tovar
Fourth official:
Sandra Serafini

Match rules

- 80 minutes.
- Rolling substitutions.
- No extra time.
- Penalty shoot-out if scores still level.
