= 1996 NCAA Division I women's soccer tournament =

1996 NCAA women's soccer tournament
Women's College Cup (semifinals & final)

Tournament details
- Country: United States
- Dates: November–December 1996
- Teams: 32

Final positions
- Champions: North Carolina Tar Heels (13th title, 15th College Cup)
- Runners-up: Notre Dame Fighting Irish (3rd title match, 3rd College Cup)
- Semifinalists: Portland Pilots (3rd College Cup); Santa Clara Broncos (4th College Cup)

Tournament statistics
- Matches played: 31
- Goals scored: 114 (3.68 per match)
- Attendance: 53,322 (1,720 per match)
- Top goal scorer(s): Danielle Fotopoulous, Florida (5); Amy Van Laacke, Notre Dame (5)

Awards
- Best player: Debbie Keller, UNC (Offensive); Nel Fettig, UNC (Defensive)

The 1996 NCAA Division I women's soccer tournament was the 15th annual single-elimination tournament to determine the national champion of NCAA Division I women's collegiate soccer. The semifinals and championship game were played at Buck Shaw Stadium in Santa Clara, California during December 1996.

North Carolina defeated Notre Dame in the final, 1–0 (in two overtimes), to win their thirteenth national title. Coached by Anson Dorrance, the Tar Heels finished the season 27–0–1. North Carolina returned to the championship after appearing in all thirteen finals prior to 1995.

The most outstanding offensive player was Debbie Keller from North Carolina, and the most outstanding defensive player was Nel Fettig, also from North Carolina. Keller and Fettig, along with eleven other players, were named to the All-tournament team.

The tournament's leading scorers, with 5 goals each, were Danielle Fotopoulous from Florida and Amy Van Laacke from Notre Dame.

== Qualification ==
All Division I women's soccer programs were eligible to qualify for the tournament. The tournament field expanded again, increasing from 24 to 32 teams, and for the third time in the previous five years.

Eleven conferences sent automatic bids to the tournament, accompanied by twenty-one at-large bids.

=== Records ===
North Carolina Regional
Seed	School	Conference	Berth Type	Record
	Clemson	ACC	At-large	15–6–1
	Florida	SEC	Automatic	20–2
	James Madison	CAA	At-large	14–4–2
	NC State	ACC	At-large	11–8–1
	North Carolina	ACC	Automatic	20–1
	UNC Greensboro	Big South	Automatic	16–5–1
	Wake Forest	ACC	At-large	13–7
	William & Mary	CAA	Automatic	14–8

Portland Regional
Seed	School	Conference	Berth Type	Record
	Duke	ACC	At-large	09–9–3
	Kentucky	SEC	At-large	13–5–2
	Minnesota	Big Ten	At-large	13–6
	Nebraska	Big 12	Automatic	21–0
	Portland	West Coast	Automatic	16–0–2
	Vanderbilt	SEC	At-large	11–8–1
	Virginia	ACC	At-large	12–6–2
	Washington	Pac-10	At-large	12–7

Santa Clara Regional
Seed	School	Conference	Berth Type	Record
	Connecticut	Big East	At-large	20–2
	Dartmouth	Ivy League	At-large	12–3–1
	George Mason	CAA	At-large	14–6–2
	Harvard	Ivy League	Automatic	15–1
	Massachusetts	Atlantic 10	Automatic	15–4–1
	Penn State	Big Ten	At-large	14–4–2
	Santa Clara	West Coast	At-large	15–3–2
	Stanford	Pac-10	Automatic	12–8

Notre Dame Regional
Seed	School	Conference	Berth Type	Record
	George Washington	Atlantic 10	At-large	10–6–4
	Indiana	Big Ten	Automatic	11–10
	Maryland	ACC	At-large	17–4–2
	Northwestern	Big Ten	At-large	13–7–1
	Notre Dame	Big East	Automatic	20–1
	San Diego	West Coast	At-large	13–5–1
	Texas A&M	Big 12	At-large	19–3
	Wisconsin	Big Ten	At-large	14–4–4

== Bracket ==
First round
North Carolina	5
William & Mary	0
James Madison	3
UNC Greensboro	1
Wake Forest	2
Clemson	1
Florida	7
NC State	3
Santa Clara	3
Stanford	2
Penn State	2
George Mason	0
UMass (3OT)	2
Harvard	1
Connecticut	1
Dartmouth	0
Portland	1
Washington	0
Vanderbilt (3OT)	2
Kentucky	1
Duke	1
Virginia	0
Nebraska (2OT)	3
Minnesota	2
San Diego	5
Texas A&M	3
Maryland	2
George Washington	0
Wisconsin	1
Northwestern	0
Notre Dame	8
Indiana	1

Second round
North Carolina	5
James Madison	0
Wake Forest	0
Florida	5
Santa Clara	3
Penn State	1
UMass	0
Connecticut	2
Portland (2OT)	3
Vanderbilt	1
Duke	0
Nebraska	3
San Diego	0
Maryland	1
Wisconsin	0
Notre Dame	5

Third Round
North Carolina	9
Florida	0
Santa Clara	1
Connecticut	0
Portland	1
Nebraska	0
Maryland	0
Notre Dame	2

Semifinals (Women's College Cup); Buck Shaw Stadium; Santa Clara, California
North Carolina	2
Santa Clara	1
Portland	2
Notre Dame	3

Championship (Women's College Cup); Buck Shaw Stadium; Santa Clara, California
North Carolina (2OT)	1
Notre Dame	0

== All-tournament team ==
- Justi Baumgardt, Portland
- Mandy Clemens, Santa Clara
- Robin Confer, North Carolina
- Lorrie Fair, North Carolina
- Nel Fettig, North Carolina (most outstanding defensive player)
- Jen Grubb, Notre Dame
- Regina Holan, Portland
- Debbie Keller, North Carolina (most outstanding offensive player)
- Jennifer Lalor, Santa Clara
- Cindy Parlow, North Carolina
- Jen Renola, Notre Dame
- Laurie Schwoy, North Carolina
- Jenny Streiffer, Notre Dame

== See also ==
- 1996 NCAA Division I men's soccer tournament
- 1996 NCAA Division II women's soccer tournament
- 1996 NCAA Division III women's soccer tournament
- 1996 NAIA women's soccer tournament
