= Margrét Rannveig Ólafsdóttir =

Icelandic footballer

Personal information
- Date of birth: 6 July 1976 (age 50)
- Place of birth: Reykjavík, Iceland
- Height: 5 ft 9 in (1.75 m)
- Position: Midfielder

Senior career*
Years	Team	Apps	(Gls)
1991–2003	Breiðablik	156	(79)
2001	Philadelphia Charge	18	(2)
Total		174	(82)

International career^{‡}
1991–1992	Iceland U-16	8	(0)
1993–2000	Iceland U-21	24	(4)
1993–2002	Iceland	51	(8)
- * Club domestic league appearances and goals as of 22:25, 9 December 2020 (UTC) ‡ National team caps and goals as of 22:25, 9 December 2020 (UTC)

Margrét Rannveig Ólafsdóttir (born 6 July 1976) is an Icelandic former professional footballer. She played 51 times for the Iceland women's national football team, scoring eight goals. Except for the 2001 season, in which she played for the Philadelphia Charge of the Women's United Soccer Association, Margrét spent her entire playing career with Breiðablik.

She was named Úrvalsdeild kvenna Player of the Year in 1994. She was the first female player to win 50 caps for Iceland.
