= Rakel Karvelsson =

Icelandic footballer

Personal information
- Full name: Rakel Bjork Karvelsson (Note: Full name in her American nationality.); Rakel Björk Ögmundsdóttir (Note: Full name in her Icelandic nationality.)
- Date of birth: 4 January 1977 (age 49)
- Place of birth: Panorama City, Los Angeles, U.S.
- Height: 5 ft 6 in (1.68 m)
- Position: Forward

College career
Years	Team	Apps	(Gls)
1995–1998	North Carolina Tar Heels	102	(40)

Senior career*
Years	Team	Apps	(Gls)
1997–2000	Breiðablik	26	(33)
2001	Philadelphia Charge	17	(1)
Total		43	(34)

International career
2000	Iceland U21	3	(3)
1999–2000	Iceland	10	(7)
- * Club domestic league appearances and goals

Rakel Bjork Campbell (née Karvelsson; Icelandic name: Rakel Björk Ögmundsdóttir; born 4 January 1977) is a former professional footballer. Born in the United States, she represented Iceland internationally. In 2000 she was named Icelandic Women's Footballer of the Year.

== Early life ==
Rakel Bjork Karvelsson was born on 4 January 1977, in Panorama City, California, to Icelandic parents Ögmundur Karvelsson and Sigurlína Björgvinsdóttir. Her brothers, Ómar and Róbert, both played soccer.

== Career ==
Karvelsson played college football for the University of North Carolina at Chapel Hill from 1995 to 1998, and gained a reputation as a super sub. She started just 8 of her 102 appearances for the Tar Heels, but contributed 40 goals and 33 assists.

She was named Icelandic Women's Footballer of the Year in 2000. She made 10 appearances for the Iceland national team, scoring 7 goals. In the 2001 season, she played for the Philadelphia Charge of the Women's United Soccer Association, after a stint at Breiðablik in Iceland. She suffered an anterior cruciate ligament injury while in training for the 2002 season.

== Personal life ==
Karvelsson attended McIntosh High School in Peachtree City, Georgia. She and her husband Lance Campbell (whose surname she adopted upon marriage), is a pharmaceutical executive who played soccer at Texas Lutheran University. They have four children; a son and three daughters. Cole Campbell, the eldest, is a professional football player, while two of the three younger children also play soccer. Her Icelandic name is Rakel Björk Ögmundsdóttir.
