= 1997 NCAA Division I women's soccer tournament =

1997 NCAA women's soccer tournament
Women's College Cup (semifinals & final)

Tournament details
- Country: United States
- Dates: November–December 1997
- Teams: 32

Final positions
- Champions: North Carolina Tar Heels (14th title, 16th College Cup)
- Runners-up: Connecticut Huskies (3rd title match, 6th College Cup)
- Semifinalists: Notre Dame Fighting Irish (4th College Cup); Santa Clara Broncos (5th College Cup)

Tournament statistics
- Matches played: 31
- Goals scored: 115 (3.71 per match)
- Attendance: 40,572 (1,309 per match)
- Top goal scorer(s): Sara Whalen, UConn (5)

Awards
- Best player: Robin Confer, UNC (Offensive); Siri Mullinix, UNC (Defensive)

The 1997 NCAA Division I women's soccer tournament (also known as the 1997 NCAA Women's College Cup) was the 16th annual single-elimination tournament to determine the national champion of NCAA Division I women's collegiate soccer. The semifinals and championship game were played at the UNCG Soccer Stadium in Greensboro, North Carolina during December 1997.

North Carolina defeated Connecticut in the final, 2–0, to win their fourteenth national title. Coached by Anson Dorrance, the Tar Heels finished the season 27–0–1.

The most outstanding offensive player was Robin Confer from North Carolina, and the most outstanding defensive player was Siri Mullinix, also from North Carolina. Confer and Mullinix, along with twelve other players, were named to the All-tournament team.

The tournament's leading scorer, with 5 goals, was Sara Whalen from Connecticut.

== Qualification ==
All Division I women's soccer programs were eligible to qualify for the tournament. The tournament field remained at 32 teams although it would expand again, to 48, in 1998.

=== Play-in games ===
November 11
Fairfield (MAAC, 17-3)	2
Central Conn. State (NEC, 13-6)	1

November 11
UNC Greensboro (Southern, 17-5)	5
South Alabama (Big South, 18-2-1)	0

November 11
Cincinnati (C-USA, 15-4-3) (OT)	2
Georgia State (TAAC, 18-3-2)	1

=== Teams ===
North Carolina Regional
Seed	School	Conference	Berth Type	Record
	Florida	SEC	Automatic	19-2-1
	George Mason	CAA	At-large	13-5-4
	Harvard	Ivy League	Automatic	10-2-2
	Maryland	ACC	At-large	12-8-3
	Massachusetts	Atlantic 10	Automatic	17-4
	North Carolina	ACC	Automatic	22-0-1
	Vanderbilt	SEC	At-large	14-7
	Wake Forest	ACC	At-large	11-7-2

Connecticut Regional
Seed	School	Conference	Berth Type	Record
	Colgate	Patriot	Automatic	13-3-3
	Connecticut	Big East	At-large	19-3
	Fairfield	MAAC	Automatic	18-3
	Hartford	America East	Automatic	18-1-1
	James Madison	CAA	At-large	13-6-2
	Penn State	Big Ten	At-large	15-6-1
	Virginia	ACC	At-large	13-4-2
	William & Mary	CAA	Automatic	18-4

Santa Clara Regional
Seed	School	Conference	Berth Type	Record
	BYU	WAC	At-large	19-3
	Clemson	ACC	At-large	13-6
	Duke	ACC	At-large	14-5-1
	Georgia	SEC	At-large	15-5-1
	Milwaukee	Midwestern Collegiate	Automatic	13-2-4
	Minnesota	Big Ten	At-large	17-2-2
	Santa Clara	West Coast	At-large	17-2-1
	UNC Greensboro	Southern	Automatic	18-5

Notre Dame Regional
Seed	School	Conference	Berth Type	Record
	Cincinnati	Conference USA	Automatic	16-4-3
	Michigan	Big Ten	Automatic	18-3-1
	Nebraska	Big 12	At-large	17-3
	Notre Dame	Big East	Automatic	20-0-1
	Portland	West Coast	Automatic	14-4
	SMU	WAC	Automatic	16-4-1
	Texas A&M	Big 12	Automatic	18-2
	UCLA	Pac-10	Automatic	17-2

== Bracket ==
First round
North Carolina	6
Wake Forest	0
Florida	3
Vanderbilt	2
Harvard	2
UMass	0
George Mason	2
Maryland	1
UNC Greensboro (2OT)	3
Duke	1
Clemson	1
Georgia	0
Minnesota	2
Milwaukee	1
Santa Clara	1
BYU	0
Connecticut	3
Fairfield	0
Hartford	4
Colgate	0
William & Mary (2OT)	3
Penn State	2
Virginia	3
James Madison	1
UCLA	1
Portland	0
SMU	1
Texas A&M	0
Nebraska	5
Michigan	1
Notre Dame	7
Cincinnati	1

Second round
North Carolina	5
Florida	0
Harvard (3OT)	2
George Mason	1
UNC Greensboro	0
Clemson	5
Minnesota	1
Santa Clara	5
Connecticut (2OT)	2
Hartford	1
William & Mary	1
Virginia	0
UCLA	3
SMU	2
Nebraska	0
Notre Dame	6

Third Round
North Carolina	1
Harvard	0
Clemson	0
Santa Clara	3
Connecticut	4
William & Mary	0
UCLA	0
Notre Dame	8

Semifinals (Women's College Cup); UNCG Soccer Stadium; Greensboro, North Carolina
North Carolina	2
Santa Clara	1
Connecticut	2
Notre Dame	1

Championship (Women's College Cup); UNCG Soccer Stadium; Greensboro, North Carolina
North Carolina	2
Connecticut	0

== All-tournament team ==
- Mandy Clemens, Santa Clara
- Robin Confer, North Carolina (most outstanding offensive player)
- Carey Dorn, Connecticut
- Lorrie Fair, North Carolina
- Jacqui Little, Santa Clara
- Holly Manthei, Notre Dame
- Siri Mullinix, North Carolina (most outstanding defensive player)
- Cindy Parlow, North Carolina
- Tiffany Roberts, North Carolina
- Heather Stone, Connecticut
- Jenny Streiffer, Notre Dame
- Jen Tietjen, Notre Dame
- Sara Whalen, Connecticut
- Staci Wilson, North Carolina

== See also ==
- 1997 NCAA Division I men's soccer tournament
- 1997 NCAA Division II women's soccer tournament
- 1997 NCAA Division III women's soccer tournament
- 1997 NAIA women's soccer tournament
