= Beth Keller =

American soccer player (born 1978)

Personal information
- Full name: Elizabeth Ann Keller
- Date of birth: June 25, 1978 (age 48)
- Place of birth: Cincinnati, Ohio, U.S.
- Height: 5 ft 6 in (1.68 m)
- Positions: Midfielder; forward

College career
Years	Team	Apps	(Gls)
1996–1999	Clemson Tigers		

Senior career*
Years	Team	Apps	(Gls)
2000	Chicago Cobras		
2001	Philadelphia Charge	0	(0)
2001–2002	Carolina Courage	1	(0)

International career
1998–1999	United States U21		
1999	United States	1	(1)
- * Club domestic league appearances and goals

Elizabeth Ann Keller (born June 25, 1978) is an American soccer player who last played for the Carolina Courage in the Women's United Soccer Association.

== High school career ==
She played on the men's varsity soccer team from the seventh through twelfth grades at Hilton Head Island High School in South Carolina, was a two-time South Carolina Girls State Player of the Year, rated as one of the nation's top 25 high women's high school players, and was elected to Parade Magazine's All-American Girls Soccer Team in 1996. Keller was inducted to the Hilton Head High Athletic Hall of Fame in 2003. Her sister, Missy Keller, was also inducted in 2010.

== Collegiate career ==
Keller played on the Clemson University women's soccer team from 1996-2000. Keller was three-time All-Atlantic Coast Conference (ACC) selection, including a First Team selection in 1999, named first team All-Southeast Region in 1996 and 1999, All-American honorable mention in 1998, finished her career in fourth on Clemson’s career list for goals scored with 35 and third in assists with 23, had 12 game-winning goals in her career at Clemson. She received the Olympic Sport Dedication Award from the Strength and Conditioning Coaches 1998-1999. She was on the Academic Honor Roll in 1996, 1997, 1998, and 1999.

In 2002, she was named to the ACC 50th Anniversary Women’s Soccer team representing a 50-member team voted on by the eight league institutions that sponsor the sport as decided by the league’s 50th Anniversary Committee.

After graduating from Clemson, she was selected as one of sixteen Atlantic Coast Conference scholar-athletes to receive the 2000 Weaver-James-Corrigan Postgraduate Award. This scholarship is given to selected student-athletes who have intentions of continuing academic work as full-time graduate students and who performed with distinction both in the classroom and in their respective sports, and demonstrated exemplary conduct in the community.

== International career ==
Keller played for the US Women's National Team (USWNT) in 1998 and 1999. She played with the US U-21 Team and won the 1999 Nordic Cup in Iceland.

She earned her first and only cap for the senior United States women's national team on February 24, 1999, in a friendly against Finland. She scored in that match, becoming one of the few players to score in their only international appearance.

== Professional career ==
She played for the Chicago Cobras and was invited to the inaugural Women's United Soccer Association combine. She was drafted to the Philadelphia Charge and later played for the Carolina Courage.

== Personal life ==
Keller majored in political science and history at Clemson University.

She received her Master of Public Administration with focus in Nonprofit Management from the University of Utah.

Keller lives in Oklahoma City, Oklahoma and works at a global movement to end child hunger. Previously she lived in Washington D.C. working at a think tank, and also lived in Atlanta, Georgia where she was a supporter of Major League Soccer club Atlanta United.
