= Mary-Frances Monroe =

American soccer player (born 1980)

Personal information
- Full name: Mary-Frances Monroe
- Date of birth: February 7, 1980 (age 46)
- Place of birth: West Islip, New York, United States
- Height: 5 ft 1 in (1.55 m)
- Position: Midfielder

College career
Years	Team	Apps	(Gls)
1998–2000	Connecticut Huskies	76	(45)
2001	UCLA Bruins		

Senior career*
Years	Team	Apps	(Gls)
- Long Island Rough Riders
2002	Philadelphia Charge	15	(1)
2003	Boston Breakers	12	(1)
2004–2005	New England Mutiny	23	(10)
2005	KIF Örebro DFF		
2007–2008	New England Mutiny	24	(22)
2009	Boston Aztec	5	(6)
2009–2012	Boston Breakers	5	(0)

International career
- United States U-21
2000–2001	United States	9	(0)

Managerial career
- 2006–2012: Albany Great Danes
- 2013–2017: Miami Hurricanes
- 2022: Hingham Harbormen
- 2023–: Wheaton Lyons
- * Club domestic league appearances and goals

Mary-Frances Monroe (born February 7, 1980) is an American former soccer midfielder who played for Boston Breakers of Women's Professional Soccer and was a member of the United States women's national soccer team.

Following her professional career, Monroe went on to serve as head coach of the University of Albany women's soccer team and then, in May 2013, took on head coaching duties for the Miami Hurricanes Women's Soccer team at the University of Miami. Following the 2017 season she was relieved of her duties as head coach.
