= Ruth Van't Land-Parkes =

American soccer player

Personal information
- Position: Forward

Youth career
- –1997: Ontario Christian High School

College career
| Years | Team | Apps | (Gls) |
| 1997–2000 | Cal Poly Pomona Broncos | 81 | (76) |

Senior career*
| Years | Team | Apps | (Gls) |
| 2001 | Philadelphia Charge | | |
- * Club domestic league appearances and goals

Ruth Van't Land-Parkes is an American former soccer player who played as a forward. She is generally regarded as the best female player in the history of Cal Poly Pomona and the California Collegiate Athletic Association.
