= Laurie Schwoy =

American soccer player (born 1978)

Personal information
- Full name: Laurie Annette Schwoy
- Date of birth: February 14, 1978 (age 48)
- Place of birth: Baltimore, Maryland, U.S.
- Height: 5 ft 4 in (1.63 m)
- Positions: Midfielder; forward

Youth career
- PHWM SC
- –1996: McDonogh Eagles

College career
Years	Team	Apps	(Gls)
1996–2000	North Carolina Tar Heels	81	(43)

Senior career*
Years	Team	Apps	(Gls)
2001	Philadelphia Charge	17	(4)

International career
1996–1998	United States U21		
1997–1999	United States	4	(0)

Managerial career
- McDonogh Eagles (assistant)
- Baltimore Bays
- Premier Soccer Club
- * Club domestic league appearances and goals

Laurie Annette Schwoy (born February 14, 1978) is an American former soccer player who played as a midfielder or forward, making four appearances for the United States women's national team.

== Career ==
Schwoy played for the McDonogh Eagles in high school, where she was a Parade High-School All-American and National Player of the Year as a senior. She was named the NSCAA/Umbro National High School Player of the Year in 1995, and was a three-time NSCAA All-American. She set a state record for career goals with 198, and was a two-time the player of the year in Maryland and named as the High School Athlete of the Year in 1995 by The Baltimore Sun. She played club soccer for Perry Hall White Marsh Soccer Club, and also participated in basketball, softball, and track in high school. In college, she played for the North Carolina Tar Heels from 1996 to 2000, having redshirted during the 1999 season due to a pulled hamstring. During her career at North Carolina, the team won the NCAA championship in 1996, 1997, and 2000. She was an All-American during her collegiate career, being named to the 1996 first team (Soccer Buzz and Soccer News) and third team (NSCAA), the 1997 first team (Soccer Buzz, Soccer Times, and NSCAA) and third team (Soccer News), as well as the 1998 first team (Soccer Times and Soccer Buzz), second team (Soccer News and College Soccer Weekly On-Line), and third team (NSCAA). She received various honors during her freshman year in 1996, having been selected as the Soccer America and Soccer Buzz Freshman Player of the Year, the ACC Freshman of the Year, and the Soccer Buzz Freshman Regional Player of the Year, as well as being included in the Freshman All-America first team (Soccer America, Soccer Buzz, and Soccer News) and the Soccer Buzz Freshman All-Region team. She was included in the All-Region first team in 1996 and 1997 (NSCAA, Soccer Buzz, and Soccer News), as well as the 1998 first team by Soccer Buzz. Schwoy was included in the All-ACC first team from 1996 to 1998, and was a finalist for the Hermann Trophy in 1997. She was also included in the All-Tournament Teams of the ACC in 1998 and the NCAA in 1996 and 1998. In total, she scored 43 goals and recorded 36 assists in 81 appearances for the Tar Heels.

Schwoy played for the U.S. under-21 national team, winning the Nordic Cup in 1997. She had also participated in the 1995 U.S. Olympic Festival in Denver. She made her international debut for the United States on May 31, 1997, in the 1997 Women's U.S. Cup against Canada. In total, she made four appearances for the U.S., earning her final cap on February 24, 1999, in a friendly match against Finland.

Schwoy was chosen by the Philadelphia Charge in the 2000 WUSA Draft. In the 2001 season, she scored four goals and recorded four assists in seventeen regular season appearances for the Charge, and played in one postseason game. She later began coaching, working as an assistant for the McDonogh Eagles. She has coached various youth club teams, including Premier Soccer Club and the Baltimore Bays, as well as helping train players at local high schools. In 2016, she was inducted into the Maryland State Athletic Hall of Fame.

== Personal life ==
Schwoy is a native of Baltimore.

== Career statistics ==
=== International ===
United States
Year	Apps	Goals
1997	3	0
1999	1	0
Total	4	0
