= Andrea Alfiler =

American soccer player

Personal information
- Full name: Mary Andrea Alfiler
- Date of birth: November 30, 1979 (age 46)
- Place of birth: Kapaa, Hawaii, U.S.
- Height: 5 ft 7 in (1.70 m)
- Position: Midfielder

College career
Years	Team	Apps	(Gls)
1997–2001	Azusa Pacific Cougars		

Senior career*
Years	Team	Apps	(Gls)
2002	Philadelphia Charge	5	(0)
2003	San Diego Spirit	2	(0)
- * Club domestic league appearances and goals

Mary Andrea Alfiler (on-DRAY-uh al-FEE-ler; born November 30, 1979) is a retired American soccer player who played for the Philadelphia Charge.

== Early life and education ==
Alfiler was born in Kapaa, Hawaii, on November 30, 1979 to Andrew and Mary Alfiler. She attended Kapaa High School, where she excelled in athletics, playing on varsity teams all four years. Her varsity teams included basketball, volleyball, cross country, and track and field. While in high school, she was named the Kaua'i Interscholastic Federation (KIF) Player of the Year twice.

In 2001, she earned a bachelor's degree in physical education from Azusa Pacific University.

== Career ==
=== Athletics ===
While studying at Azusa Pacific University (APU), Alfiler played for the school's women's soccer and basketball teams. During her tenure on the school's soccer team, Alfiler earned all-conference, all-regional, and All-American honors three times, as well as three National Association of Intercollegiate Athletics (NAIA) all-tournament honors. Her final year, the women's soccer team won their first national championship, and Alfiler was named the NAIA Player of the Year, as well as the Golden State Athletic Conference's most valuable player.

In 2002, Alfiler was selected in the third round of the Women's United Soccer Association (WUSA) draft to played for the Philadelphia Charge. She transferred to the San Diego Spirit the following year. After the Women's United Soccer Association folded in 2003, Alfiler began playing semi-professionally with the Rochester Reign in the Women's Premier Soccer League.

=== Coaching ===
Alfiler was an assistant coach at Point Loma Nazarene University for a single season in 2003 before taking a position as assistant coach for the women's soccer team at San Diego State University the following year. In 2005, she joined the coaching team at Tulane University.

As of 2019, Alfiler was head coach of the girls' soccer team at Kapaa High School. In 2023, she was named the Kaua'i Interscholastic Federation Coach of the Year.
