= Saskia Webber =

American retired soccer player

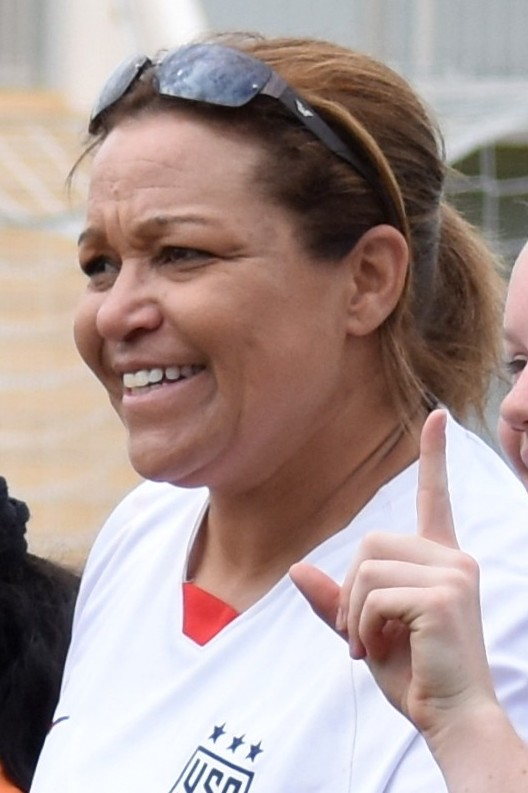

Personal information
- Full name: Saskia Johanna Webber
- Date of birth: June 13, 1971 (age 55)
- Place of birth: Princeton, New Jersey, U.S.
- Height: 5 ft 9 in (1.75 m)
- Position: Goalkeeper

College career
Years	Team	Apps	(Gls)
1989–1992	Rutgers Scarlet Knights	78	(0)

Senior career*
Years	Team	Apps	(Gls)
1996–1998	OKI F.C. Winds		
2001	Philadelphia Charge		
2002–2003	New York Power		

International career
1992–2000	United States	28	(0)
Medal record
Women's football (soccer)
Representing the United States
Olympic Games
Gold medal – first place	1996 Atlanta	Team competition
World Cup
Gold medal – first place	1999 USA	Team competition
- * Club domestic league appearances and goals

Saskia Johanna Webber (born June 13, 1971) is a retired American soccer goalkeeper who previously played for the United States women's national soccer team as well as the New York Power and Philadelphia Charge in the Women's United Soccer Association. She is currently a broadcaster covering NWSL and other soccer games.

== Early life ==
She began playing soccer and other sports when she was six.

Webber attended Princeton High School in Princeton, New Jersey.

=== Rutgers University ===
Webber was a four-year starter on the women's soccer team at Rutgers University from 1989 to 1992. During her senior year, she helped lead the team to four consecutive East Coast Athletic Conference tournaments and three championships MVP of ECAC Tournament. She was named a two-time All-Eastern Region selection and a First-Team NSCAA All-American the same year. She also won the Missouri Athletic Club Goalkeeper of the Year Award and was a finalist for the Hermann Trophy.

As a senior, she received the Sonny Werblin Award, the highest athletic honor at Rutgers and was the first female soccer player to be inducted into the Rutgers Athletics Hall of Fame in 1998.

== Playing career ==
=== Club ===
Webber played three seasons for OKI F.C. Winds in the Japanese Women's Professional L. League from 1996 to 1998.

In 2001, she joined the Philadelphia Charge in the Women's United Soccer Association, the first professional women's soccer league in the United States. During the inaugural season, she played 12 games and posted a record of 4–5–3. She played a total of 998 minutes and made 44 saves while allowing 18 goals for a 1.62 GAA. The following season, she was traded to the New York Power.

After the WUSA folded in 2003, Webber joined her former national team teammates, Brandi Chastain, Mia Hamm, Kristine Lilly to participate in the 2004 WUSA Soccer Festivals.

=== International ===
Webber first appeared for the United States women's national soccer team on August 14, 1992 at the age of 21 in a game against Norway. In 1993, she was the team's starting goalkeeper for most of the year playing a total of 12 matches. She was on the U.S. 1996 Summer Olympics team serving as a reserve member.

She was the back-up goalkeeper for the 1999 Women's World Cup champions. During 1999, she played in seven games posting a record of 5–0–1. She was a fan favorite on the 1999 U.S. Women's World Cup soccer team and was known for her red, white, and blue hairstyles.

== Coaching career ==
Saskia has been an assistant coach at the North Carolina State and Rutgers University. During the 1990s, Saskia was Assistant Director of Soccer Plus camps and ran goalkeeper training at North Carolina State summer camps.

== Television & film career ==
During the 2000 Summer Olympic Games in Sydney, Australia, Saskia reported and did commentary for ESPN on women's soccer.

She was a television host for Q Television's On Q Live and appeared in the film, The Kentucky Fried Movie. She has openly discussed her sexuality and has been a representative for the Gay Games, as well as covered athletes preparing for the competitions.

== See also ==
- United States women's national soccer team
- Philadelphia Charge
- New York Power
