= Michelle Demko =

American soccer player and coach (born 1973)

Personal information
- Date of birth: September 27, 1973 (age 53)
- Place of birth: Lafayette, Louisiana, U.S.
- Height: 5 ft 4 in (1.63 m)
- Position: Midfielder

Youth career
- –1991: Seminole High School

College career
Years	Team	Apps	(Gls)
1991–1992	Barry Buccaneers	34	(24)
1993, 1995	Maryland Terrapins	38	(8)

Senior career*
Years	Team	Apps	(Gls)
1994–1996	Maryland Pride		
- Tampa Bay Extreme
- SC Klinge Seckach
- FSV Frankfurt
- Bayern Munich
2001–2002	Philadelphia Charge	21	(2)

International career
1997	United States	1	(0)

Managerial career
- 2003–2006: NC State Wolfpack (assistant)
- 2007–2010: Nebraska Cornhuskers (assistant)
- 2010–2017: UNC Asheville Bulldogs
- 2011–2012: United States U20 (assistant)
- 2013: United States U23 (assistant)
- 2018–2023: George Washington Revolutionaries
- * Club domestic league appearances and goals

Michelle Demko (born September 27, 1973) is an American former soccer player and coach who played as a midfielder, making one appearance for the United States women's national team.

== Career ==
Demko played for the Seminole Warhawks in high school. In college, she played for the Barry Buccaneers from 1991 to 1992, helping the team to win the NCAA Division II Women's Soccer Championship in 1992. She was included in the NSCAA All-Region team, as well as the Florida All-State Selection, in 1991 and 1992. She also was selected in the Soccer America All-Freshman Team in 1991, as well as the NCAA All-Tournament Team in 1991. In total, she scored 24 goals and recorded 17 assists in 34 appearances for the Buccaneers. She later played for the Maryland Terrapins during the 1993 and 1995 seasons, having redshirted in 1994. She was included in the All-ACC and NSCAA All-Region first teams in 1995, and was selected in the ACC All-Tournament Team in the same year. She scored eight goals and recorded seven assists in 38 appearances for the Terrapins.

Demko participated in three editions of the U.S. Olympic Festival from 1994 to 1996, and trained with the national team from 1995 to 1997. She made her only international appearance for the United States on October 9, 1997 in a friendly match against Germany. She came on as a substitute in the 76th minute for Tiffeny Milbrett, with the match finishing as a 1–3 loss.

In club soccer, Demko played for the Maryland Pride from 1994 to 1996, as well as the Tampa Bay Extreme. She played in Germany for three seasons at SC Klinge Seckach, FSV Frankfurt, and Bayern Munich from 1997 to 2000. From 2001 to 2002, she played for the Philadelphia Charge after being chosen in the 2000 WUSA Draft. She scored 2 goals and registered 1 assist for Philadelphia during the regular season, while making one postseason appearance where she recorded one assist.

Demko was included in the ACC 50th Anniversary Women's Soccer Team. She began coaching after her playing career, working as an assistant for the NC State Wolfpack from 2003 to 2006, and the Nebraska Cornhuskers from 2007 to 2010. She became the head coach of the UNC Asheville Bulldogs in 2010, where she coached for eight seasons until 2017. In 2018, she was appointed as the head coach of the George Washington Revolutionaries. She also served as an assistant coach for the U.S. under-20 national team from 2011 to 2012 during preparation for the 2012 FIFA U-20 Women's World Cup, and the under-23 team in 2013. She moved on as coach at George Washington after the 2023 season.

== Personal life ==
Demko was born in Lafayette, Louisiana, but grew up in Largo, Florida. She graduated from the University of Maryland, College Park in 1996 with a Bachelor of Science in kinesiology.

== Career statistics ==
=== International ===
United States
Year	Apps	Goals
1997	1	0
Total	1	0
