= Jen Mascaro =

American soccer player (born 1978)

Personal information
- Full name: Jennifer Streiffer Mascaro
- Birth name: Jennifer Streiffer
- Date of birth: May 25, 1978 (age 48)
- Place of birth: Metairie, Louisiana, U.S.
- Height: 5 ft 6 in (1.68 m)
- Position: Midfielder

Youth career
- –1996: Baton Rouge Bulldogs

College career
Years	Team	Apps	(Gls)
1996–1999	Notre Dame Fighting Irish	100	(70)

Senior career*
Years	Team	Apps	(Gls)
2001–2002	San Diego Spirit	28	(3)

International career
- United States U20
1999–2000	United States	4	(2)
- * Club domestic league appearances and goals

Jennifer Streiffer Mascaro (née Streiffer; born May 25, 1978) is an American former soccer player who played as a midfielder, making four appearances for the United States women's national team. She is also an anthropologist.

== Career ==
Mascaro played for the Baton Rouge Bulldogs in high school, where she was three-time Louisiana High School Player of the Year and named to the All-State team in all four seasons. She helped the team to win state titles in her sophomore and junior years, and was a Parade and NSCAA All-American. She also was selected to All-State for cross country and track in high school. In college, she played for the Notre Dame Fighting Irish from 1996 to 1999. In total, she scored 70 goals and recorded 71 assists in 100 appearances for the Fighting Irish. She was an NSCAA Third-Team All-American in 1996 and 1999, and was included in the Soccer America All-Freshman Team in 1996. She was also included in the NCAA College Cup All-Tournament Team in 1996, 1997, and 1999. She was also included in the CoSIDA Academic All-America First Team in 1997 and Second Team in 1998. In 1999, she was named Big East Championship Most Outstanding Player, and later that year was awarded an NCAA Postgraduate Scholarship. She is ranked second in career points (goals and assists) at the school, with 211, and points per match, with 2.11.

In club soccer, Mascaro played for the San Diego Spirit from 2001 to 2002, where she scored 3 goals and recorded 6 assists in 28 appearances.

After graduating high school, Mascaro was included as an alternate player in the United States squad for the inaugural women's soccer tournament at the 1996 Summer Olympics in Atlanta. She was part of the under-20 national team which won the 1997 Nordic Cup. She made her international debut for the United States on February 24, 1999 in a friendly match against Finland. In total, she made four appearances for the U.S. and scored two goals, earning her final cap on January 13, 2000 in the 2000 Australia Cup against Australia, winning the tournament.

== Personal life ==
Mascaro was born in Metairie, Louisiana, though Baton Rouge is her hometown. She married Nathan Mascaro in 1999. She graduated from the University of Notre Dame in 2000 with bachelor's degrees in pre-professional studies and anthropology. In 2011, she earned a PhD in anthropology from Emory University.

== Career statistics ==
=== International ===
United States
Year	Apps	Goals
1999	1	0
2000	3	2
Total	4	2

=== International goals ===
No.	Date	Location	Opponent	Score	Result	Competition
1	January 27, 2000	Melbourne, Australia	Czech Republic	1–0	8–1	2000 Australia Cup
2	January 27, 2000	Melbourne, Australia	Czech Republic	6–0	8–1	2000 Australia Cup

== Honors ==
United States

- Australia Cup: 2000
