= Melissa Moore (soccer) =

American soccer player (born 1975)

Personal information
- Birth name: Melissa Liston
- Date of birth: July 17, 1975 (age 51)
- Place of birth: Van Nuys, California, United States
- Position: Goalkeeper

College career
Years	Team	Apps	(Gls)
1993–1996	New Mexico Lobos	68	(0)

Senior career*
Years	Team	Apps	(Gls)
2001	San Diego Spirit		
2001–2003	Philadelphia Charge	43	(0)
- * Club domestic league appearances and goals

Melissa Moore (née Liston; born July 17, 1975) is a retired American soccer player who played for the Philadelphia Charge as a goalkeeper. Widely recognized as one of the league's top goalkeepers, Moore played professionally for the Charge during the Women's United Soccer Association's entire three-year run. During her college career, she started in 68 games for the University of New Mexico Lobos.

== Early life and education ==
Born Melissa Liston in Van Nuys, she attended Bonita High School in La Verne, California. She initially joined the Bonita varsity soccer team as a freshman midfielder, but switched to goalkeeper from her sophomore year onward. In February 1993, she was named to PARADE's All-America High School Girls Soccer Team. In addition to soccer, she played volleyball, swam, ran track, and played badminton.

She graduated from the University of New Mexico with a degree in psychology, and earned a master's degree in athletic administration at Illinois State University. At Illinois State, she worked as a graduate assistant coach for the women's soccer team.

== College career ==
In 1993, Liston signed with the University of New Mexico Lobos women's soccer team as its first varsity recruit. She was recruited by head coach Amy Allmann, a former player with the United States women's national soccer team (USWNT).

During UNM's first season, Liston was named a Far West All-American. At the end of their second season, she was named to the All-West Region second team, finishing second in the region with 130 saves, and a goals-against average of 1.64. In 1995, she was named to the UNM Athletics Hall of Honor as Female Athlete of the Year. By the time she graduated, she had set school records for total number of saves (438) and shutouts (18).

== Professional career ==
After completing her master's degree, Moore contacted the San Diego Spirit to inquire about a possible administrative position with the club which was starting in the new Women's United Soccer Association (WUSA) league, but was invited to a local tryout instead. In February 2001, she was invited to join the preseason roster as a walk-on player, making her one of three goalkeepers with the San Diego Spirit, including two international players: Ulrika Karlsson from Sweden and Jaime Pagliarulo from the USA.

During the WUSA spring training tournament, Moore impressed Philadelphia Charge coach Mark Krikorian, who signed her after she was waived. Soccer Digest later referred to Moore as "one of Krikorian's shrewdest acquisitions".

On April 22, 2001, Moore started in goal for the Philadelphia Charge, playing against the San Diego Spirit their inaugural match. She proceeded to shut out her former teammates 2–0 in front of a sell-out crowd of 6,155 at Torero Stadium, in what The San Diego Union Tribune called the WUSA's "first fairy tale". She pulled off a second shutout against the Spirit when the two teams met again later that season. Moore started in 9 matches that year with a 5–3–1 record, allowing only 1.01 goals per game, but was sidelined for part of the season due to injury. Her performance during the playoffs was said to be "shaky".

During her second season, Moore was widely recognized as one of the top goalkeepers in the league, leading what Soccer Digest called "a nearly impenetrable defense". Moore started in all but one game, with a record of 11–3–6, bringing the Philadelphia Charge within one game of securing the top position within the WUSA during the regular season, and helping them secure a place in the playoffs. She had the best goals-against average in the league (1.0), had the second highest save percentage (78.18%), and made the third most saves (86).

Ahead of the WUSA's third and final season, the Philadelphia Charge's top draft pick was University of Washington goalkeeper Hope Solo; USA Today commented that the Charge had "[set] up an interesting situation for the starting spot." While competition between Moore and Solo was intense, Moore remained the Charge's "usual" starting goalkeeper for most of the season.

== International career ==
Moore trained with the United States women's national soccer team in 1996.

== Personal life ==
As of July 2001, Moore was one of only two Philadelphia Charge players who was married. She was featured along with midfielder Michelle Demko in The Makeover Story, which premiered on The Learning Channel in October 2001.
