= Rebekah McDowell =

American soccer player

Personal information
- Date of birth: March 21, 1978 (age 48)
- Place of birth: Denver, Colorado, United States
- Height: 5 ft 8 in (1.73 m)
- Position: Midfielder

College career
Years	Team	Apps	(Gls)
1996–1999	North Carolina Tar Heels	104	

Senior career*
Years	Team	Apps	(Gls)
2001–2002	Philadelphia Charge	31	(1)
2003	Boston Breakers	10	(0)

International career
- United States U21
- * Club domestic league appearances and goals

Rebekah Kay McDowell (born March 21, 1978, in Denver) is a retired American soccer player who played in the Women's United Soccer Association (WUSA).

== Early life and education ==
McDowell was born in Denver, Colorado, on March 21, 1978 to Scott and Kathy McDowell. She grew up with four siblings in Lakewood, Colorado.

McDowell attended Wheat Ridge High School, where she excelled in athletics. She earned recognition as the most valuable player for her school's track, basketball, cross country, and soccer teams. Her achievements in soccer led to her being named first-team All-League and All-State for all four years. In the realm of running, she made history by becoming the first person in Colorado state history to secure four individual state championships. In basketball, she garnered first-team All-League honors three times over her four-year varsity tenure. In 1995, the Colorado Sports Hall of Fame named her the Female Prep Athlete of the Year. The subsequent year, she received the Fred Steinmark High School Athlete of the Year Award.

After graduating from high school in 1996, she attended the University of North Carolina, graduating in 2000.

== Career ==
=== Athletic career ===
In 1995, McDowell participated in the U.S. Olympic Festival.

While attending the University of North Carolina, McDowell played for the school's soccer team, where she was an All-American and All-Atlantic Coast Conference player. During her tenure, the team won three national championships.

From 1995 to 1998, McDowell played for the United States women’s under-21 soccer team at the Nordic Cup, winning the match in her final year.

In 2003, McDowell was traded to play for the Washington Freedom, though she never played for the team before being sent to play for the Carolina Courage, who quickly waived her. She ultimately played the season with the Boston Breakers.

After WUSA folded at the end of the 2003 season, McDowell played in the Women's Premier Soccer League.

In 2006, McDowell signed with the Tennessee Lady Blues.

=== Coaching ===
Beginning in 2003, McDowell coached an under-12 team in Colorado.

In 2015, McDowell took on the position of assistant coach at Bishop McGuinness Catholic High School.

== Honor ==
McDowell was inducted into the Colorado Sportswomen Hall of Fame.
