= Karyn Hall =

American soccer player

Personal information
- Date of birth: May 29, 1980 (age 46)
- Place of birth: San Antonio, Texas
- Height: 5 ft 6 in (1.68 m)
- Position: Defender

College career
Years	Team	Apps	(Gls)
1998–2001	Florida Gators	100	(8)

Senior career*
Years	Team	Apps	(Gls)
2002–2003	Philadelphia Charge	10	(0)
- * Club domestic league appearances and goals

Karyn Eusey (née Hall; born May 29, 1980, in San Antonio) is a retired American soccer player who played for the Philadelphia Charge.

== Early life and education ==
Hall was born in San Antonio, Texas on May 29, 1980, though she grew up in Winter Springs, Florida. She graduated from Oviedo High School, where she was on the school's soccer, track, and cross-country teams. Her senior year, while playing for the Tampa Bay Heather club team, Hall won the state championships, and was named the Orlando Sentinel Co-Player of the Year. She was also included on the Florida High School Activities Association academic all-state team.

Hall attended the University of Florida, where she studied industrial and systems engineering.

== Career ==
From 1993 to 1997, Hall was a member of the State Olympic Development Team. In 1994 and 1995, she was a member of the U.S. Southern Region III U-15 team, at the end of which she travelled to Denmark to train with the Danish National U-16 Development Team. In 1998, she was included in the pool for the U.S. Southern Region III U-19 team.

While attending the University of Florida, Hall played for the school's soccer team, starting in all 100 games she played over four years. Her senior year, she set two university records, one for number of consecutive matches played (100) and another for consecutive matches started (100).

In 1999, Hall was a member of the United States women's soccer team at the 1999 Pan American Games in Winnipeg, where the team won the gold medal.

In 2002, she was selected in the fourth round of the Women's United Soccer Association's draft to play for the Philadelphia Charge. She remained with the team until WUSA collapsed in 2003.
