= Jennifer Soileau =

American soccer player

Personal information
- Date of birth: March 15, 1975 (age 51)
- Place of birth: Baton Rouge, Louisiana, United States
- Position: Midfielder

College career
Years	Team	Apps	(Gls)
1997–2000	Ole Miss Rebels		(30)

Senior career*
Years	Team	Apps	(Gls)
2001	Philadelphia Charge	6	(0)

Managerial career
- 2004–2006: Louisiana Tech Lady Techsters
- * Club domestic league appearances and goals

Jennifer Soileau Burns (born March 15, 1975, in Baton Rouge, Louisiana) is a retired American soccer player who played in the Women's United Soccer Association (WUSA).

== Early life and education ==
Soileau was born in Baton Rouge on March 15, 1975. She attended Parkview Baptist High School, where she excelled on the school's soccer team, though a girls' team did not exist in her first year, so she played on the boys' team. She was named the district's most valuable player (MVP) twice and selected for the all-state team twice. In 1997, she received the Louisiana Class 3A All-State MVP Award. Soileau received a bachelor's degree from the University of Mississippi in 2000, then a master's degree in education from Southeastern Louisiana University in 2004.

== Career ==
=== Athletics ===
While studying at the University of Mississippi, Soileau played for the school's women's soccer team. Her first year on the team, she set freshman records for most goals scored (11) and total points earned (31). During her tenure, she was selected for the All-Southeastern Conference first team three times (1998, 1999, 2000). In 2000, she was named to the All-Central Region first team and earned Academic All-American honors. Upon graduation, she held the university's record for points scored (99).

In 2000, she became a member of the United States Adult Soccer Association national team pool.

In 2001, Soileau was selected in the third round of the WUSA draft to play for the Philadelphia Charge.

=== Coaching ===
After completing her professional career, Burns began coaching, including at Parkview Baptist High School and Bishop Sullivan High School.

In 2003, Soileau became the first head coach for Louisiana Tech University's soccer teams.

== Honors ==
Burns has been inducted into the Ole Miss M Club and Parkview Baptist High School Halls of Fame.

== Personal life ==
In 2006, Soileau married Bob Burns. The couple have a child named Baily.
