= Stacey Tullock =

English American soccer player (born 1978)

Personal information
- Full name: Stacey Dee Tullock
- Date of birth: September 20, 1978 (age 48)
- Place of birth: Saltburn, England
- Height: 1.70 m (5 ft 7 in)
- Position: Midfielder

College career
| Years | Team | Apps | (Gls) |
| 1997–2001 | Arizona State Sun Devils | | (50) |

Senior career*
| Years | Team | Apps | (Gls) |
| 2002–2003 | Philadelphia Charge | 35 | (5) |

International career
| 2000 | United States U21 | | |
- * Club domestic league appearances and goals

Stacey Dee Tullock (September 20, 1978) is a retired American soccer player who played for the Philadelphia Charge.

== Career ==
Tullock is an English born American soccer player. Tullock attended Arizona State University, Tullock played for the university's team, whilst playing Tullock won Pac-12 Conference Women's Soccer Player of the Year. Tullock was a first round pick for the 2002 WUSA draft for the Philadelphia Charge.

== International career ==
Tullock has represented the United States at U-21 level.
