= Heather Mitts =

American soccer player (born 1978)

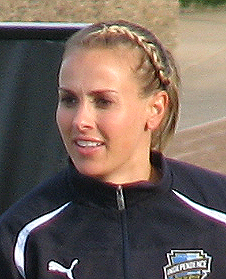
- Mitts in May 2010

Personal information
- Full name: Heather Mitts Feeley
- Birth name: Heather Blaine Mitts
- Date of birth: June 9, 1978 (age 48)
- Place of birth: Cincinnati, Ohio
- Height: 5 ft 5 in (1.65 m)
- Positions: Defender; right back

College career
Years	Team	Apps	(Gls)
1996–1999	Florida Gators		

Senior career*
Years	Team	Apps	(Gls)
2000	Tampa Bay Extreme		
2001–2003	Philadelphia Charge	51	(0)
2005	Central Florida Krush	4	(0)
2009	Boston Breakers	19	(0)
2010	Philadelphia Independence	17	(0)
2011	Atlanta Beat	8	(0)
2013	Boston Breakers	0	(0)

International career
1999–2012	United States	137	(2)
Medal record
Women's football
Representing the United States
Olympic Games
Gold medal – first place	2004 Athens	Team competition
Gold medal – first place	2008 Beijing	Team competition
Gold medal – first place	2012 London	Team competition
FIFA Women's World Cup
Silver medal – second place	2011 Germany	Team competition
- * Club domestic league appearances and goals

Heather Mitts Feeley (born Heather Blaine Mitts; June 9, 1978) is an American former professional soccer defender. Mitts played college soccer for the University of Florida, and thereafter, she played professionally in the Women's Professional Soccer (WPS) league; for the Philadelphia Charge, Boston Breakers, Philadelphia Independence and Atlanta Beat. She is a three-time Olympic gold medalist, and was a member of the U.S. women's national team. She played in four matches in the 2011 FIFA Women's World Cup, where the U.S. national team finished second. Mitts announced her retirement from soccer via Twitter on March 13, 2013.

== Early life ==
Mitts was born in Cincinnati, Ohio, on June 9, 1978, and began playing soccer at the age of six. From 1993 to 1996, she attended St. Ursula Academy in Cincinnati, where she played high school soccer and helped the team tally a 70-5-1 record during her time with the team. During her freshman season, the team won the state title. During her junior and senior years, Mitts earned all-state honors.

=== University of Florida Gators ===
Mitts received an athletic scholarship to attend the University of Florida in Gainesville, Florida, and played for coach Becky Burleigh's Florida Gators women's soccer team in National Collegiate Athletic Association (NCAA) competition from 1996 to 1999. Mitts was part of the defensive line that helped the Gators win their first-ever NCAA Women's Soccer Championship in 1998. She was named a third-team All-American in 1998 and a first-team All-American in 1999, and became the Gators' all-time record holder in appearances (95), starts (94), and minutes played (7,547). She graduated from the University of Florida with a bachelor's degree in advertising in 2000. She was inducted into the University of Florida Athletic Hall of Fame as a "Gator Great" in 2013.

== Club career ==
=== Tampa Bay Extreme, 2000 ===
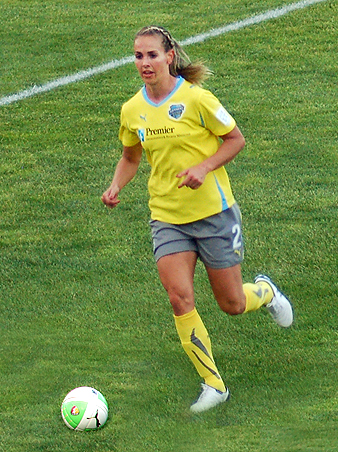
Mitts with the Independence in May 2010

Straight out of college, Mitts played for Tampa Bay Extreme of W-League in 2000 while waiting for the launch of the new Women's United Soccer Association league.

=== Philadelphia Charge, 2001-03 ===
Upon the WUSA's launch and inaugural season in 2001, Mitts was drafted to the Philadelphia Charge. With the club, she appeared in twenty games (1,751 minutes) in the inaugural season and added two assists. Throughout her Charge career, Mitts appeared in fifty-one games (4,414 minutes) and recorded eight assists over three seasons. She was named as a WUSA All-Star in 2003. Unfortunately, after the 2003 season, the WUSA ceased operations.

=== Central Florida Krush, 2005 ===
Mitts returned to the W-League in 2005, playing sparingly for Central Florida Krush while splitting her time between the United States Women's National Team. She appeared in four games (360 minutes).

=== WPS Years, 2009–11 ===
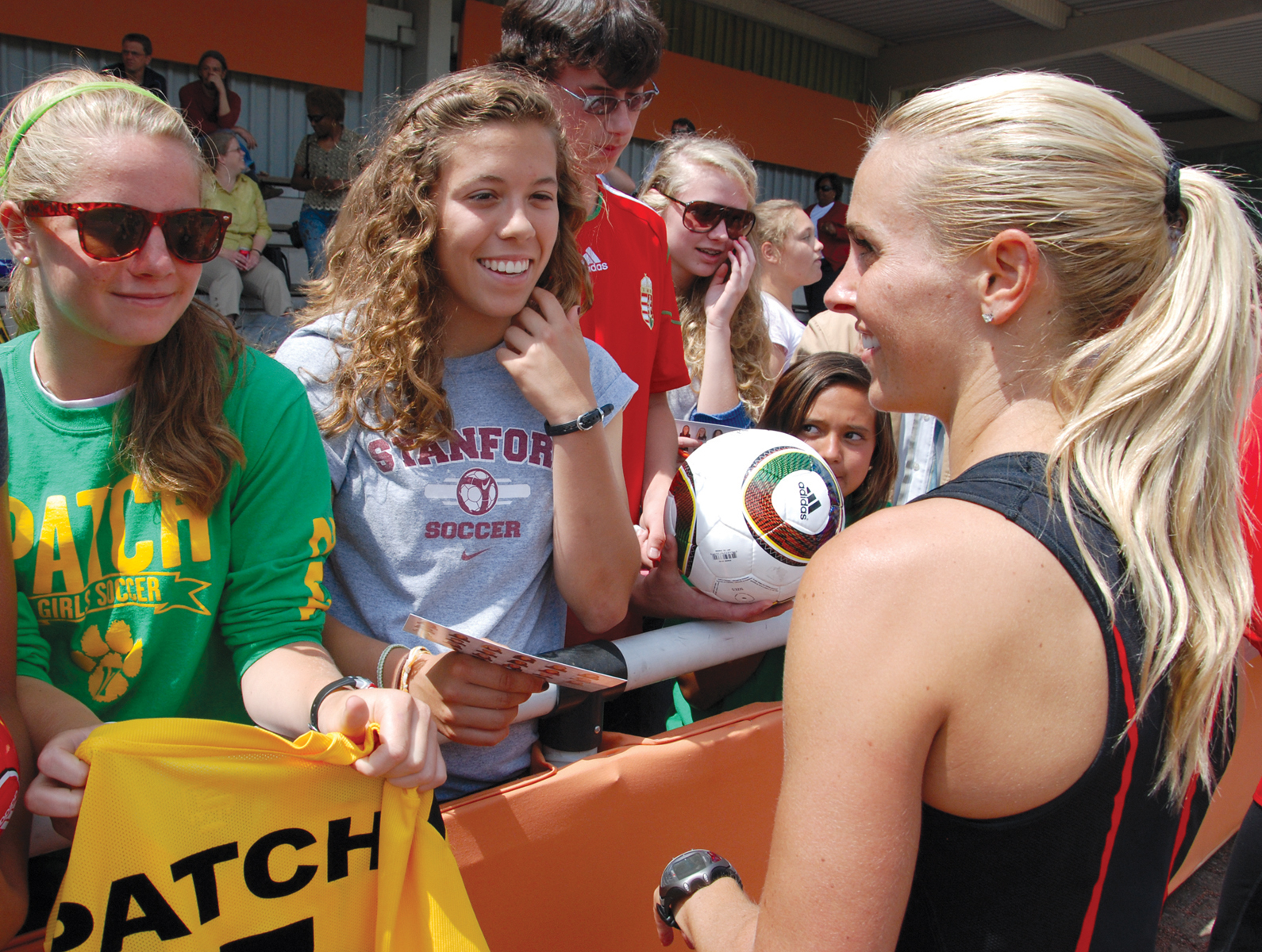
Heather Mitts signing autographs for fans in 2011.

Upon the introduction of Women's Professional Soccer, Mitts and fellow USWNT players Angela Hucles and Kristine Lilly were allocated to the Boston Breakers on September 16, 2008. In the inaugural 2009 Women's Professional Soccer season, Mitts appeared in nineteen games (all starts, 1,631 minutes) and added an assist. After the season, the Boston Breakers declared Mitts a free agent.

On October 14, 2009, Mitts signed with 2010 WPS expansion team Philadelphia Independence, marking her return to play professional soccer in Philadelphia following the demise of the WUSA's Philadelphia Charge.

In January 2011, Mitts signed with the Atlanta Beat and played right defensive back during the 2011 season.

=== NWSL, 2013 ===
In 2013, Mitts was allocated to the Boston Breakers in the new National Women's Soccer League; however, she retired before the start of the season.

== International career ==
Mitts has represented the United States women's national soccer team in over 100 international matches. She is a three-time Olympic gold medalist (2004, 2008, and 2012).

On May 12, 2007, Mitts tore her anterior cruciate ligament (ACL) in an international friendly match with Canada. The injury put Mitts out of contention for the 2007 FIFA Women's World Cup.

On May 9, 2011, Mitts was named to the U.S. roster for the 2011 FIFA Women's World Cup tournament in Germany. She was also named to the U.S. roster for the 2012 London Olympics, and played all 90 minutes of the match against Colombia in group stage.

On March 13, 2013, Mitts officially announced her retirement from the national team as well as the Breakers. She serves as a sideline reporter for Philadelphia Union games and has become a team ambassador.

== Career statistics ==
=== International goals ===
Mitts scored 2 goals in international matches, which are both game winners.

Key (expand for notes on "international goals" and sorting)
Location	Geographic location of the venue where the competition occurred Sorted by country name first, then by city name
Lineup	Start – played entire match on minute (off player) – substituted on at the minute indicated, and player was substituted off at the same time off minute (on player) – substituted off at the minute indicated, and player was substituted on at the same time (c) – captain Sorted by minutes played
Min	The minute in the match the goal was scored. For list that include caps, blank indicates played in the match but did not score a goal.
Assist/pass	The ball was passed by the player, which assisted in scoring the goal. This column depends on the availability and source of this information.
penalty or pk	Goal scored on penalty-kick which was awarded due to foul by opponent. (Goals scored in penalty-shoot-out, at the end of a tied match after extra-time, are not included.)
Score	The match score after the goal was scored. Sorted by goal difference, then by goal scored by the player's team
Result	The final score. Sorted by goal difference in the match, then by goal difference in penalty-shoot-out if it is taken, followed by goal scored by the player's team in the match, then by goal scored in the penalty-shoot-out. For matches with identical final scores, match ending in extra-time without penalty-shoot-out is a tougher match, therefore precede matches that ended in regulation
aet	The score at the end of extra-time; the match was tied at the end of 90' regulation
pso	Penalty-shoot-out score shown in parentheses; the match was tied at the end of extra-time
	Green background color – exhibition or closed door international friendly match
NOTE: some keys may not apply for a particular football player

	Date	Location	Opponent	Lineup	Min	Assist/pass	Score	Result	Competition
1	Jul 3, 2004	Nashville TN	Canada	Start	73	Shannon Boxx	1–0	1–0	Friendly
2	Sep 25, 2004	Rochester NY	Iceland	on 46' (off Reddick)	93+	Julie Foudy	4–3	4–3	Friendly

== Personal life ==
Mitts has held a number of television commentary jobs. She has served as a studio soccer analyst for ABC, ESPN and ESPN2 during the 2003 FIFA Women's World Cup and was a sideline reporter for several MLS broadcasts in 2005. In addition to broadcasting soccer, she also was a sideline reporter for American college football during fall 2005 for ESPN.

Mitts married NFL quarterback A. J. Feeley in February 2010. They have a son born in 2014, a daughter born in 2016, and a son born in 2018.

Mitts runs a soccer camp every year throughout the United States in which she teaches the basics of soccer including: dribbling, juggling, foot-skills, passing, receiving. These are one-day soccer camps that teach children to grasp the fundamentals of soccer and allow them to continue their growth and understanding of the sport.

== Honors ==
- CONCACAF Women's Olympic Qualifying Tournament: 2008, 2012
- CONCACAF Women's Championship: 2006
- Olympic Gold Medal: 2004, 2008, 2012

== See also ==
- All-time Boston Breakers (WPS) roster
- List of multiple Olympic gold medalists in one event
- List of Olympic medalists in football
- List of University of Florida alumni
- List of University of Florida Olympians
- List of University of Florida Athletic Hall of Fame members
