= Tampa Bay Extreme =

Women's soccer club in Clearwater, Florida

The Tampa Bay Extreme were a USL W-League women's soccer club based out of Clearwater, Florida. The team began play in 1997 and folded after the 2002 season. In 1998, they signed Michelle Akers. Based at the 2,000-seater sports field at Countryside High School, the team colors were white and red.

== Year-by-year ==
Year	Division	League	Reg. season	Playoffs	Avg. attendance
1997	1	USL W-League	4th, South	Did not qualify	186
1998	1	USL W-League	4th, South	Did not qualify	424
1999	1	USL W-League	3rd, South	Divisional round	402
2000	1	USL W-League	3rd, South	Did not qualify	459
2001	1	USL W-League	5th, Eastern	Divisional round	317
2002	1	USL W-League	7th, Central conference, Atlantic division	Did not qualify	49

== Head coach ==
- (England) Don Tobin 2000
