= Marinette Pichon =

French footballer (born 1975)

Personal information
- Date of birth: 26 November 1975 (age 50)
- Place of birth: Bar-sur-Aube, France
- Height: 1.63 m (5 ft 4 in)
- Position: Forward

Senior career*
| Years | Team | Apps | (Gls) |
| 1991–1992 | A.S. Brienne | | |
| 1992–2002 | Saint-Memmie Olympique | | |
| 2002–2003 | Philadelphia Charge | 36 | (28) |
| 2003–2004 | Saint-Memmie Olympique | 11 | (5) |
| 2004 | New Jersey Wildcats | 10 | (21) |
| 2004–2007 | Juvisy FCF | 58 | (89) |

International career
| 1994–2006 | France | 112 | (81) |
- * Club domestic league appearances and goals

Marinette Pichon (French pronunciation: [maʁinɛt piʃɔ̃]; born 26 November 1975) is a French former football player who is the sporting director of Montreal Roses FC of the Northern Super League.

== Early life ==
Pichon grew up while having a dysfunctional childhood with an alcoholic father.

== Club career ==
Pichon started her career at Saint-Memmie Olympique, then signed on to the Women's United Soccer Association (WUSA), the American professional league. She played for the Philadelphia Charge during their 2002 and 2003 seasons, in 2002 ranking second in the league in goals scored and winning the Most Valuable Player and Offensive Player of the Year awards. In 2003, she tied for the lead in goals scored and led the league in goals per game.

After the WUSA disbanded in 2003, she returned to France, where she played for Juvisy FCF. She was the leading domestic scorer in the 2000–01, 2001–02, 2004–05, and 2005–06 seasons. She also played for the New Jersey Wildcats in the American W-League during their 2004 season, leading the league that year in both goals scored and total points despite playing in only 10 matches.

== International career ==
She appeared for France from 1994 until 2006, announcing her retirement at the age of 31 following France's elimination from World Cup qualifying. During her career, she scored 81 goals in 112 international matches. She played for France at the 2003 FIFA Women's World Cup.

== Managerial career ==
In June 2024, Pichon was named as the sporting director of Montreal Roses FC in Canada's Northern Super League.

== Personal life ==
In November 2012, a change in law gave Pichon the distinction of being the second woman in France to be granted "paternity" leave. Her wife gave birth to their son following in vitro fertilisation (IVF). Pichon received a Legion of Honour.

=== In popular culture ===
In 2023, Garance Marillier portrayed Pichon in Marinette, a biographical film of her life adapted from Pichon's autobiography Ne jamais rien lâcher.

== Career statistics ==
=== International ===
| No. | Date | Venue | Opponent | Score | Result | Competition |
|---|---|---|---|---|---|---|
| 1. | 25 September 1994 | Aberdeen, Scotland | Scotland | 3–0 | 3–0 | UEFA Women's Euro 1995 qualifying |
| 2. | 12 November 1994 | Cork, Ireland | Republic of Ireland | 3–0 | 3–0 | Friendly |
| 3. | 11 April 1995 | Poissy, France | Canada | 1–0 | 1–0 | Friendly |
| 4. | 12 April 1995 | Saint-Maur-des-Fossés, France | Italy | 1–0 | 1–0 | Friendly |
| 5. | 8 September 1995 | Jesolo, Italy | Hungary | 1–0 | 2–0 | Friendly |
| 6. | 8 September 1995 | Jesolo, Italy | Hungary | 2–0 | 2–0 | Friendly |
| 7. | 30 September 1995 | Akranes, Iceland | Iceland | 1–2 | 3–3 | UEFA Women's Euro 1997 qualifying |
| 8. | 30 September 1995 | Akranes, Iceland | Iceland | 2–3 | 3–3 | UEFA Women's Euro 1997 qualifying |
| 9. | 9 December 1995 | Montpellier, France | Netherlands | 1–0 | 1–1 | UEFA Women's Euro 1997 qualifying |
| 10. | 29 April 1996 | Indianapolis, United States | United States | 1–8 | 2–8 | Friendly |
| 11. | 1 June 1996 | Angers, France | Iceland | 1–0 | 3–0 | UEFA Women's Euro 1997 qualifying |
| 12. | 1 June 1996 | Angers, France | Iceland | 3–0 | 3–0 | UEFA Women's Euro 1997 qualifying |
| 13. | 7 September 1996 | Vantaa, Finland | Finland | 1–0 | 2–0 | UEFA Women's Euro 1997 qualifying |
| 14. | 7 September 1996 | Vantaa, Finland | Finland | 2–0 | 2–0 | UEFA Women's Euro 1997 qualifying |
| 15. | 12 April 1997 | Mouscron, Belgium | Belgium | 1–0 | 3–0 | Friendly |
| 16. | 24 April 1997 | Greensboro, United States | United States | 1–1 | 2–4 | Friendly |
| 17. | 24 April 1997 | Greensboro, United States | United States | 2–3 | 2–4 | Friendly |
| 18. | 18 October 1997 | Le Creusot, France | Finland | 2–1 | 2–2 | 1999 FIFA Women's World Cup qualification |
| 19. | 15 February 1998 | Alençon, France | England | 1–0 | 3–2 | Friendly |
| 20. | 15 February 1998 | Alençon, France | England | 2–1 | 3–2 | Friendly |
| 21. | 21 March 1998 | Guéret, France | Poland | 2–0 | 3–0 | Friendly |
| 22. | 11 April 1998 | Blois, France | Italy | 1–0 | 2–3 | 1999 FIFA Women's World Cup qualification |
| 23. | 14 May 1998 | Cesson-Sévigné, France | Algeria | 10–0 | 14–0 | Friendly |
| 24. | 16 May 1998 | Rennes, France | Spain | 1–0 | 3–2 | Friendly |
| 25. | 20 February 1999 | Chalkida, Greece | Greece | 1–0 | 3–2 | Friendly |
| 26. | 9 May 1999 | Airdire, Scotland | Scotland | 1–1 | 4–3 | Friendly |
| 27. | 9 May 1999 | Airdire, Scotland | Scotland | 2–2 | 4–3 | Friendly |
| 28. | 28 May 1999 | Weil am Rhein, Germany | Switzerland | 1–0 | 2–0 | Friendly |
| 29. | 28 May 1999 | Weil am Rhein, Germany | Switzerland | 2–0 | 2–0 | Friendly |
| 30. | 30 May 1999 | Weil am Rhein, Germany | Germany | 1–0 | 1–4 | Friendly |
| 31. | 28 June 2001 | Reutlingen, Germany | Denmark | 1–2 | 3–4 | UEFA Women's Euro 2001 |
| 32. | 1 July 2001 | Ulm, Germany | Italy | 1–0 | 2–0 | UEFA Women's Euro 2001 |
| 33. | 26 September 2001 | Hoogeveen, Netherlands | Netherlands | 2–0 | 3–1 | Friendly |
| 34. | 26 September 2001 | Hoogeveen, Netherlands | Netherlands | 3–0 | 3–1 | Friendly |
| 35. | 28 October 2001 | Boryspil, Ukraine | Ukraine | 1–0 | 2–0 | 2003 FIFA Women's World Cup qualification |
| 36. | 28 October 2001 | Boryspil, Ukraine | Ukraine | 2–0 | 2–0 | 2003 FIFA Women's World Cup qualification |
| 37. | 17 November 2001 | Drnovice, Czech Republic | Czech Republic | 1–0 | 2–1 | 2003 FIFA Women's World Cup qualification |
| 38. | 17 November 2001 | Drnovice, Czech Republic | Czech Republic | 2–0 | 2–1 | 2003 FIFA Women's World Cup qualification |
| 39. | 9 April 2002 | Limoges, France | Australia | 1–0 | 1–0 | Friendly |
| 40. | 20 April 2002 | Strasbourg, France | Czech Republic | 2–0 | 4–1 | 2003 FIFA Women's World Cup qualification |
| 41. | 9 May 2002 | Halden, Norway | Norway | 1–1 | 1–3 | 2003 FIFA Women's World Cup qualification |
| 42. | 1 June 2002 | Châteauroux, France | Ukraine | 1–1 | 2–1 | 2003 FIFA Women's World Cup qualification |
| 43. | 23 August 2002 | Lens, France | Denmark | 1–0 | 2–0 | 2003 FIFA Women's World Cup qualification |
| 44. | 17 October 2002 | London, England | England | 1–0 | 1–0 | 2003 FIFA Women's World Cup qualification |
| 45. | 14 March 2003 | Silves, Portugal | Denmark | 1–0 | 3–0 | 2003 Algarve Cup |
| 46. | 14 March 2003 | Silves, Portugal | Denmark | 2–0 | 3–0 | 2003 Algarve Cup |
| 47. | 11 May 2003 | Kecskemét, Hungary | Hungary | 1–0 | 4–0 | UEFA Women's Euro 2005 qualifying |
| 48. | 11 May 2003 | Kecskemét, Hungary | Hungary | 3–0 | 4–0 | UEFA Women's Euro 2005 qualifying |
| 49. | 14 September 2003 | Concord, United States | Japan | 1–0 | 2–2 | Friendly |
| 50. | 14 September 2003 | Concord, United States | Japan | 2–0 | 2–2 | Friendly |
| 51. | 24 September 2003 | Washington D.C., United States | South Korea | 1–0 | 1–0 | 2003 FIFA Women's World Cup |
| 52. | 27 September 2003 | Washington D.C., United States | Brazil | 1–1 | 1–1 | 2003 FIFA Women's World Cup |
| 53. | 15 November 2003 | Quimper, France | Poland | 4–0 | 7–1 | UEFA Women's Euro 2005 qualifying |
| 54. | 15 November 2003 | Quimper, France | Poland | 5–0 | 7–1 | UEFA Women's Euro 2005 qualifying |
| 55. | 15 November 2003 | Quimper, France | Poland | 7–0 | 7–1 | UEFA Women's Euro 2005 qualifying |
| 56. | 21 February 2004 | Montpellier, France | Scotland | 2–2 | 6–3 | Friendly |
| 57. | 21 February 2004 | Montpellier, France | Scotland | 3–3 | 6–3 | Friendly |
| 58. | 21 February 2004 | Montpellier, France | Scotland | 4–3 | 6–3 | Friendly |
| 59. | 21 February 2004 | Montpellier, France | Scotland | 6–3 | 6–3 | Friendly |
| 60. | 16 March 2004 | Quarteira, Portugal | Sweden | 2–0 | 3–0 | 2004 Algarve Cup |
| 61. | 18 March 2004 | Silves, Portugal | Denmark | 1–0 | 1–0 | 2004 Algarve Cup |
| 62. | 20 March 2004 | Faro, Portugal | Italy | 1–0 | 3–3 (4–3 p) | 2004 Algarve Cup |
| 63. | 24 April 2004 | Reims, France | Hungary | 3–0 | 6–0 | UEFA Women's Euro 2005 qualifying |
| 64. | 24 April 2004 | Reims, France | Hungary | 4–0 | 6–0 | UEFA Women's Euro 2005 qualifying |
| 65. | 24 April 2004 | Reims, France | Hungary | 5–0 | 6–0 | UEFA Women's Euro 2005 qualifying |
| 66. | 16 May 2004 | Selyatino, Russia | Russia | 2–0 | 3–0 | UEFA Women's Euro 2005 qualifying |
| 67. | 16 May 2004 | Selyatino, Russia | Russia | 3–0 | 3–0 | UEFA Women's Euro 2005 qualifying |
| 68. | 8 September 2004 | Slagelse, Denmark | Denmark | 3–2 | 3–2 | Friendly |
| 69. | 3 October 2004 | Opole, Poland | Poland | 1–1 | 5–1 | UEFA Women's Euro 2005 qualifying |
| 70. | 3 October 2004 | Opole, Poland | Poland | 2–1 | 5–1 | UEFA Women's Euro 2005 qualifying |
| 71. | 3 October 2004 | Opole, Poland | Poland | 5–1 | 5–1 | UEFA Women's Euro 2005 qualifying |
| 72. | 19 February 2005 | La Manga, Spain | Norway | 1–0 | 2–0 | Friendly |
| 73. | 11 March 2005 | Guia, Portugal | Denmark | 1–0 | 2–1 | 2005 Algarve Cup |
| 74. | 13 March 2005 | Loulé, Portugal | Finland | 1–1 | 2–1 | 2005 Algarve Cup |
| 75. | 6 June 2005 | Preston, England | Italy | 2–0 | 3–1 | UEFA Women's Euro 2005 |
| 76. | 6 June 2005 | Preston, England | Italy | 3–0 | 3–1 | UEFA Women's Euro 2005 |
| 77. | 7 September 2005 | Sens, France | Republic of Ireland | 2–0 | 6–0 | Friendly |
| 78. | 5 November 2005 | Langenrohr, Austria | Austria | 1–1 | 3–1 | 2007 FIFA Women's World Cup qualification |
| 79. | 22 April 2006 | Dunaujvaros, Hungary | Hungary | 1–0 | 5–0 | 2007 FIFA Women's World Cup qualification |
| 80. | 22 April 2006 | Dunaujvaros, Hungary | Hungary | 3–0 | 5–0 | 2007 FIFA Women's World Cup qualification |
| 81. | 29 August 2006 | Dieppe, France | Canada | 1–0 | 2–2 | Friendly |
