= Mark Krikorian (soccer) =

American sports executive and former soccer coach

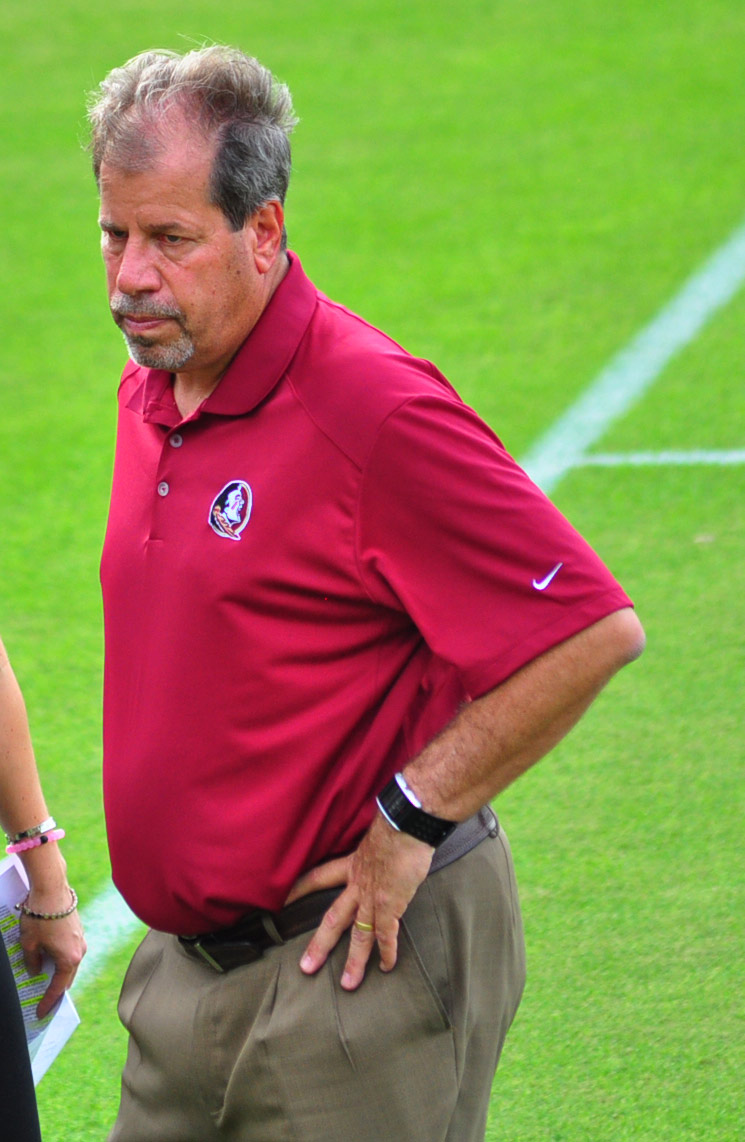
- Krikorian in 2015

Personal information
- Date of birth: March 28, 1960 (age 66)
- Place of birth: Malden, Massachusetts, U.S.
- Position: Half-back

Team information
- Current team: Washington Spirit (general manager)

Youth career
- –1978: Pinkerton Astros

College career
Years	Team	Apps	(Gls)
1979–1982	Saint Anselm Hawks		

Managerial career
- 1988–1990: UMaine Farmington Beavers (men; asst.)
- 1990–1995: Franklin Pierce Ravens (women)
- 1996–2000: Hartford Hawks (women)
- 2001–2003: Philadelphia Charge
- 2004–2005: United States U19 (women)
- 2005–2021: Florida State Seminoles (women)
- 2022–: Washington Spirit (women, President of Soccer Operations)
Medal record
Women's soccer
Head coach of United States U19
FIFA U-19 Women's World Championship
Third place	2004 Thailand

Mark Krikorian (born March 28, 1960) is an American sports executive and former soccer coach who is president of soccer operations and general manager of Washington Spirit.

== Career ==
A long-time college soccer coach, Krikorian is most well known being the head coach for the Florida State Seminoles women's soccer team from 2005 until his abrupt retirement from coaching in 2022. In 2014, Krikorian led the Florida State Seminoles women's soccer team to their first NCAA Women's Soccer Championship, where they defeated the Virginia Cavaliers 1–0. Krikorian previously coached at Franklin Pierce University and the University of Hartford.

Krikorian also served as head coach of Philadelphia Charge of the Women's United Soccer Association (WUSA), which ran for three seasons from 2001 until 2003. He was named WUSA Coach of the Year in 2002. In 2004, Krikorian coached the United States women's under-19 team to the 2004 FIFA U-19 Women's World Championship in Thailand.

In 2022 Washington Spirit announced that Krikorian had been appointed as President of Soccer Operations.

== Collegiate coaching record ==
Record table
Season	Team	Overall	Conference	Standing	Postseason
Franklin Pierce Ravens (Northeast-10) (1990–1995)
1990	Franklin Pierce				
1991	Franklin Pierce				
1992	Franklin Pierce				NCAA DII Semifinalist
1993	Franklin Pierce				NCAA DII Semifinalist
1994	Franklin Pierce	19–0–0			NCAA DII Champion
1995	Franklin Pierce	20–0–0			NCAA DII Champion
Franklin Pierce:		93–19–3 (.822)			
Hartford Hawks (America East Conference) (1996–2000)
1996	Hartford	4–14–0	2–5–0	7th	NCAA Second Round
1997	Hartford	19–2–1	9–0–0	1st	NCAA Second Round
1998	Hartford	17–5–0	9–0–0	1st	NCAA Third Round
1999	Hartford	18–5–2	9–0–0	1st	NCAA Quarterfinals
2000	Hartford	17–4–0	8–1–0	2nd	NCAA Second Round
Hartford:		75–30–3 (.708)	37–6 (.860)		
Florida State Seminoles (ACC) (2005–present)
2005	Florida State	20–4–1	8–2–0		College Cup Semifinals
2006	Florida State	18–4–4	5–2–3		College Cup Semifinals
2007	Florida State	18–6–3	6–2–2		NCAA Runner-up
2008	Florida State	17–3–3	8–1–1		NCAA Quarterfinals
2009	Florida State	19–5–1	7–2–1		NCAA Quarterfinals
2010	Florida State	16–6–1	7–2–1		NCAA Quarterfinals
2011	Florida State	18–7–1	5–5–0		College Cup Semifinals
2012	Florida State	20–4–0	8–2–0		College Cup Semifinals
2013	Florida State	23–2–3	10–1–2		NCAA Runner-up
2014	Florida State	24–1–1	9–0–1		NCAA Champion
2015	Florida State	18–3–4	6–1–3	2nd	College Cup Semifinals
2016	Florida State	14–4–4	6–2–2	6th	NCAA Second Round
2017	Florida State	13–7–1	5–4–1	7th	NCAA Round of 16
2018	Florida State	20–4–3	5–4–1	7th	NCAA Champion
2019	Florida State	18–6–0	8–2–0	2nd	NCAA Quarterfinals
2020	Florida State	13–0–3	8–0–0	1st	NCAA Runner-up
2021	Florida State	21–1–3	7–1–2	2nd	NCAA Champion
Florida State:		310–67–36 (.794)	118–33–27 (.739)		
Total:		478–116–42 (.785)			
National champion Postseason invitational champion Conference regular season champion Conference regular season and conference tournament champion Division regular season champion Division regular season and conference tournament champion Conference tournament champion

== Coaching honors ==
Franklin Pierce Ravens

- NCAA Division II Women's Soccer Championship: 1994, 1995

Hartford Hawks

- America East Tournament champions: 1997, 1998, 1999
- America East regular season champions: 1997, 1998, 1999

Florida State Seminoles

- NCAA Division I Women's Soccer Championship: 2014, 2018, 2021
- ACC regular season champions: 2009, 2012, 2014, 2020
- ACC Women's Soccer Tournament Champions: 2011, 2013, 2014, 2015, 2016, 2018, 2020, 2021

United States U-20

- 2004 FIFA U-19 Women's World Championship bronze medal: 2004

Individual

- NSCAA Division II National Coach of the Year: 1992, 1995
- Women's United Soccer Association Coach of the Year: 2002
- TopDrawerSoccer.com National Coach of the Year: 2018
- United Soccer Coaches College Coach of the Year: 2014, 2020
