= Mandy Clemens =

American soccer player (born 1978)

Personal information
- Full name: Amanda Kate Cavan
- Birth name: Amanda Kate Clemens
- Date of birth: September 3, 1978 (age 48)
- Place of birth: San Diego, California, U.S.
- Height: 5 ft 5 in (1.65 m)
- Position: Forward

College career
Years	Team	Apps	(Gls)
1996–1999	Santa Clara Broncos		

Senior career*
Years	Team	Apps	(Gls)
1999	Silicon Valley Red Devils		(3)
2001–2002	Philadelphia Charge	38	(7)
2003	San Jose CyberRays	16	(0)
2004	San Diego SeaLions	2	(0)
2007	Ajax America Women	0	(0)

International career^{‡}
1999–2002	United States	5	(0)
- * Club domestic league appearances and goals as of 20:55, December 28, 2013 (UTC) ‡ National team caps and goals as of 20:55, December 28, 2013 (UTC)

Amanda Kate Cavan (née Clemens; born September 3, 1978) is an American former soccer player. A forward, she played for the U.S. women's national soccer team as well as the Philadelphia Charge and San Jose CyberRays of the Women's United Soccer Association (WUSA).

== Playing career ==
=== College ===
Clemens attended Santa Clara University and found success in college soccer as a forward. She graduated in 1999 with a degree in business. With the Broncos, Clemens was twice named a First-Team All-American. In 95 games at Santa Clara she scored 67 goals and served 67 assists, both all-time records in program history. She collected the Hermann Trophy, for the best college player in the country, after her senior year in 1999.

She spent the final six months of her college career in Brisbane, Australia, where she eschewed soccer in favor of running half marathons. This caused Clemens to lose so much weight that "startled" national coach April Heinrichs told her she no longer resembled a soccer player.

=== Club ===
In 2000, Clemens was among the twenty founding players of the Women's United Soccer Association, (WUSA), the first official professional women's soccer league in the United States. From 2001 to 2002, she played for the Philadelphia Charge. After her second season in Philadelphia, team coach Mark Krikorian traded Clemens to San Jose CyberRays in exchange for a fourth round draft pick, which he used to acquire Hope Solo. Clemens had often been moved into midfield or left on the substitutes' bench after an injury to Philadelphia's Kelly Smith saw Krikorian make tactical changes.

With the demise of WUSA, Clemens signed for pro–am Women's Premier Soccer League (WPSL) team San Diego WFC SeaLions for the 2004 season. In 2007, she joined WPSL team Ajax America Women. During her graduation year in 1999, Clemens had played WPSL soccer for Silicon Valley Red Devils – she scored three goals and added an assist to total seven points.

=== International ===
Clemens's first appearance on the United States women's national soccer team was on February 24, 1999, in a 3–1 win over Finland in Orlando, Florida. She collected a total of five caps over the following three years, but was not included in the US squads for the 1999 FIFA Women's World Cup, or the 2000 Sydney Olympics.

== Personal life ==
In 2004, Clemens took part in the ABC reality television show The Bachelor. After her soccer career, she became a mental health counselor and a qualified practitioner of mindfulness-based stress reduction (MBSR). In 2012, she was pregnant with twins.
