= John Natale =

American soccer coach

Current position
- Title: Head coach
- Team: Hartford Hawks
- Conference: Conference of New England

Biographical details
- Born: Wethersfield, Connecticut
- Education: Eastern Connecticut State University

Coaching career (HC unless noted)
- 2000: Hartford (assistant)
- 2003: Boston Breakers (assistant)
- 2004–present: Hartford
- 2011–2012: United States (women; scout/video analyst)

Head coaching record
- Overall: 137–103–43

Accomplishments and honors

Championships
- 2× ECAC Champion (2023, 2024); America East Tournament (2006); 5× America East regular season (2006, 2014–2016, 2018)

Awards
- Connecticut Soccer Hall of Fame (2015)

John Natale is an American soccer coach, and current head coach for the Hartford Hawks women's soccer team. Before becoming the head coach at Hartford, Natale was an assistant for the Boston Breakers, and an assistant at Hartford in 2000.

== Coaching career ==
Natale served as an assistant at Hartford during the 2000 season, where the team posted a 17–4 record, losing to Harvard in the second round of the NCAA tournament. In his third season at Hartford, Natale led the team to a 10–9–2 record and a berth in the NCAA tournament. At Hartford he has won one conference tournament and five regular season championships. In 2015 Natale was inducted into the Connecticut Soccer coaches Hall of Fame.

In 2011, Natale served as a scout for the United States women's national team under head coach Pia Sundhage at the 2011 FIFA Women's World Cup. A year later, he again rejoined the staff as a video analysis coach for the team at the Olympic football tournament.

== Head coaching record ==
Record table
Season	Team	Overall	Conference	Standing	Postseason
Hartford Hawks (America East Conference) (2004–present)
2004	Hartford	5–12–2	4–4–1	T-6th	
2005	Hartford	4–13–1	2–5–1	7th	
2006	Hartford	10–9–2	6–0–2	1st	NCAA First Round
2007	Hartford	7–6–5	5–1–2	3rd	
2008	Hartford	8–6–5	4–3–1	4th	
2009	Hartford	6–10–2	2–5–1	7th	
2010	Hartford	7–9–3	4–2–2	T-3rd	
2011	Hartford	13–2–3	6–1–1	2nd	
2012	Hartford	11–5–3	6–2	2nd	
2013	Hartford	11–6–3	5–3	4th	
2014	Hartford	10–4–5	5–1–2	1st	
2015	Hartford	11–4–4	4–1–3	1st	
2016	Hartford	13–5–1	6–1–1	T-1st	
2017	Hartford	8–9–2	4–3–1	4th	
2018	Hartford	13–3–2	6–1–1	T-1st	
2019	Hartford	10–7–2	5–2–1	3rd	
2020	Hartford	†	†	†	†
2021	Hartford	8–4–4	3–3–3		
Hartford Hawks (Independent) (2022–2023)
2022	Hartford	10–3–1	0–0		
Hartford Hawks (Commonwealth Coast Conference) (2023–2024)
2023	Hartford	16–2	9–0		ECAC Champions
Hartford Hawks (Conference of New England) (2024–present)
2024	Hartford	16–3–2	7–1–1	1st	ECAC Champions
Hartford:		197–122–57 (.600)	93–39–23 (.674)		
Total:		197–122–57 (.600)			
National champion Postseason invitational champion Conference regular season champion Conference regular season and conference tournament champion Division regular season champion Division regular season and conference tournament champion Conference tournament champion

†NCAA canceled 2020 collegiate activities due to the COVID-19 virus.
