= Jenny Benson =

American soccer player (born 1978)

Personal information
- Full name: Jennifer Lee Spiehs
- Birth name: Jennifer Lee Benson
- Date of birth: January 25, 1978 (age 48)
- Place of birth: Fountain Valley, California, U.S.
- Height: 5 ft 5 in (1.65 m)
- Positions: Midfielder; defender

College career
Years	Team	Apps	(Gls)
1996–2000	Nebraska Cornhuskers	92	(26)

Senior career*
Years	Team	Apps	(Gls)
2001–2003	Philadelphia Charge	59	(0)
2004	FC Energy Voronezh		
2005	New Jersey Wildcats	4	(1)

International career
2001–2003	United States	8	(0)
- * Club domestic league appearances and goals

Jennifer Lee Spiehs (née Benson; born January 25, 1978) is a retired American soccer midfielder/defender who was a member of the United States women's national soccer team.

== International career statistics ==
Nation	Year	International Appearances				
Nation	Year	Apps	Starts	Minutes	Goals	Assists
United States	2001	1	0	22	0	0
United States	2002	4	3	255	0	1
United States	2003	3	2	161	0	0
Career Total	3	8	5	438	0	1
