= Jennifer Grubb =

American soccer player (born 1978)

Personal information
- Full name: Jennifer Leigh Grubb
- Date of birth: July 20, 1978 (age 48)
- Place of birth: Elkhart, Indiana, United States
- Height: 5 ft 7 in (1.70 m)
- Position: Defender

College career
Years	Team	Apps	(Gls)
1996–1999	Notre Dame Fighting Irish	71	(6)

Senior career*
Years	Team	Apps	(Gls)
2001–2006	Washington Freedom	63	(5)
2010	Sky Blue FC	4	(0)

International career
- United States U20
1995–1999	United States	12	(2)
- * Club domestic league appearances and goals

Jennifer Leigh Grubb (born July 20, 1978) is an American former women's soccer player.

== Career ==
Grubb was the only WUSA player to participate in every minute of every game for her team. She was the number two pick in the 2001 WUSA supplemental draft. She played for the Washington Freedom from 2001 to 2006 and was inducted into the Hall of Freedom on July 24, 2010. In 2010, Grubb was a player-coach for Sky Blue FC in Women's Professional Soccer.

== Statistics ==
=== International ===
United States
Year	Apps	Goals
1995	3	0
1996	6	1
1997	2	0
1999	1	1
Total	12	2

=== International goals ===
No.	Date	Venue	Opponent	Score	Result	Competition	Ref.
1	January 18, 1996	Campinas, Brazil	Ukraine	4–0	6–0	Brazil Soccer Cup	
2	February 24, 1999	Seminole County Sports Training Center, Sanford, Florida, United States	Finland	1–0	3–1	Friendly	

== Honors ==
=== International ===
United States

- Women's U.S. Cup: 1995
- Brazil Soccer Cup: 1996
