= Jennifer Tietjen-Prozzo =

American retired soccer player

Personal information
- Birth name: Jennifer Tietjen
- Date of birth: July 14, 1977 (age 49)
- Place of birth: Mineola, New York
- Height: 5 ft 8 in (1.73 m)
- Positions: Midfielder; defender

Youth career
- Cold Spring Harbor Thumpers
- Huntington High School

College career
Years	Team	Apps	(Gls)
1995–1998	UConn Huskies	97	(16)

Senior career*
Years	Team	Apps	(Gls)
1997–2000	Long Island Lady Riders		
2001–2003	Philadelphia Charge	59	(2)
2003	Western Massachusetts Lady Pioneers		
- * Club domestic league appearances and goals

Jennifer Tietjen-Prozzo (née Tietjen; born July 14, 1977) is an American retired soccer player who used to play for the Philadelphia Charge.

== Early life and education ==
Tietjen-Prozzo and her identical twin sister, Margaret, were born in 1977; they have two older brothers. The sisters played with the Cold Spring Harbor Thumpers, where they won multiple Long Island Junior Soccer League and Eastern New York Youth Soccer Association titles.

They attended Huntington High School. In 1994, the sisters were named All-Americans and Co-Players of the Year in New York and helped their team win the state title.

Following their graduation in 1995, Tietjen-Prozzo attended the University of Connecticut, receiving a Bachelor of Science in kinesiology and exercise science in 1999. She has also received a coaching diploma from the National Soccer Coaches Association of America.

== Career ==
=== College soccer ===
While attending the University of Connecticut, Tietjen-Prozzo played for the university's soccer team. Providing 64 assists across 97 games, Tietjen-Prozzo became an assist record holder, providing 23 assists her sophomore year and 22 her junior year. In 1997, she was named the team's Most Valuable Player (MVP). The following year, she was a finalist for Soccer Buzz's Player of the Year. On three separate occasions, she was named a First Team All-Big East, All-Northeast, and All-New England honoree.

=== Professional career ===
In 1997, Tietjen-Prozzo made her debut in the USL W-League playing for the Long Island Lady Riders. She remained with the team until 2000 and served as team captain.

In 2001, Tietjen-Prozzo was drafted for the Philadelphia Charge, a Women's United Soccer Association (WUSA) team. She remained on the team until WUSA suspended operations. At the end of her first season, Tietjen-Prozzo was named team caption and remained in the position for the remainder of her tenure with the team. In 2002, she was a finalist for Defensive Player of the Year.

In 2003, she played for the Western Massachusetts Lady Pioneers, where she served as team captain.

=== Coaching ===
Tietjen-Prozzo began her career as an assistant at Central Connecticut State University prior to the 2004 season. In her tenure, the team has received numerous titles, including nine Northeast Conference Regular Season titles and eight Northeast Conference Tournament titles. She has also received personal honors, including the United Soccer Coaches Regional Coaching Staff of the Year award twice, the Northeast Conference Team Sportsmanship Award twice, and the NEWISA Division I Assistant Coach of the Year.

== Personal life ==
Tietjen-Prozzo married Darren Prozzo in 2001. As of 2012, the couple lived in Southington, Connecticut with their two children.

== Honors ==
In 2019, both Tietjen-Prozzo and her sister were inducted into the Long Island Soccer Player Hall of Fame.
