= Lorrie Fair =

American soccer player (born 1978)

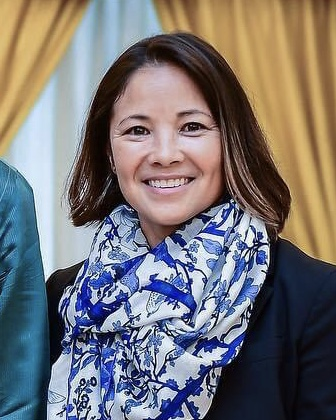
- Lorrie Fair in 2013.

Personal information
- Full name: Lorraine Fair Allen
- Birth name: Lorraine Ming Fair
- Date of birth: August 5, 1978 (age 48)
- Place of birth: Los Altos, California, U.S.
- Height: 5 ft 3 in (1.60 m)
- Position: Midfielder

College career
Years	Team	Apps	(Gls)
1996–1999	North Carolina Tar Heels		

Senior career*
Years	Team	Apps	(Gls)
2001–2003	Philadelphia Charge	53	(1)
2005	Olympique Lyonnais Féminin	11	(0)
2008	Chelsea		

International career
1996–2005	United States	120	(7)

Managerial career
- 2006: North Carolina (Volunteer Assistant Coach)
Medal record
Women's football (soccer)
Representing the United States
Olympic Games
Silver medal – second place	2000 Sydney	Team
FIFA Women's World Cup
Gold medal – first place	1999 USA	Team competition
- * Club domestic league appearances and goals

Lorraine Fair Allen (born Lorraine Ming Fair; August 5, 1978) is a retired American professional soccer midfielder who was a member of the World Cup Champion United States women's national soccer team in 1999. Over the span of ten years, she was a part of one World Cup Team and three Olympic teams, and retired from international play in 2005.

Her twin sister, Ronnie Fair, (now Ronnie Fair Sullins) was also a member of the national team. When Ronnie was called in to participate in a game against England on May 9, 1997 at San Jose, California, it became the first time a pair of sisters played together on the USWNT.

In 2023, Fair was named to the San Jose Sports Hall of Fame.

== Early career ==
Lorrie and Ronnie both participated on Los Altos High School's female soccer team in Los Altos, California, where they grew up. They were born at Stanford Hospital, but moved to New York for three years before returning to the Bay Area in 1982. While Ronnie chose Stanford to go to college, Lorrie decided on the University of North Carolina at Chapel Hill instead, but not before being a two time NSCAA all-American and Parade magazine all-American. At UNC, she was picked as one of Soccer America's freshmen of the year, and she helped lead UNC to the NCAA championship in 1996, 1997, and 1999. She also won the Honda Sports Award as the nation's top soccer player.

== National team career ==
She joined the United States women's national under-20 soccer team in 1994, playing in the Nordic Cup (amongst other events). In 1995, she was a member of the West Team at the US Olympic Festival, and she was invited to train with the National team. While a senior in high school, at the age of 17, she was named an alternate for the 1996 Atlanta Olympic Games team (which won gold at the tournament). Fair rejected the chance to travel as an alternate because she was upset at being cut from national coach Tony DiCicco's main 16 player squad.

Fair had made her senior international debut against Norway in February 1996. In March 1998 she scored her first international goal against New Zealand at RFK Stadium.

After sitting out the 1996 Olympic games, she earned a more permanent spot on the team and in 1999, she was the youngest member of the team that won that year's FIFA Women's World Cup. She played every minute of the 2000 Olympics in Sydney, taking home a silver medal after an overtime loss to Norway in the championship game. In her last world event, she was an alternate on the gold medal-winning Olympic team in 2004 and then retired in 2005 with 120 international appearances.

== International goals ==
No.	Date	Venue	Opponent	Score	Result	Competition
1.	14 March 2000	Faro, Portugal	Denmark	1–1	2–1	2000 Algarve Cup
2.	5 May 2000	Portland, United States	Mexico	7–0	8–0	2000 Women's U.S. Cup
3.	23 June 2000	Hershey, United States	Trinidad and Tobago	2–0	11–0	2000 CONCACAF Women's Gold Cup
4.	23 June 2000	Hershey, United States	Trinidad and Tobago	3–0	11–0	2000 CONCACAF Women's Gold Cup

== Club career ==
Fair played for the Philadelphia Charge in the WUSA (2001–2003), Olympique Lyonnais in Lyon, France (2005), and Chelsea FC in the UK (2008–2009).

Lorrie, Ronnie and their older brother, Greg all got their start and played for many years in AYSO Region 43.

She most recently played for Chelsea in the FA Women's Premier League. On February 1, 2008, it was announced that Fair had signed for Chelsea Ladies as a player, for whom she had been working solely as an ambassador up to that point. Fair vowed to continue her work with the club at grass roots level. The move was significant as she became the first American international to sign for a club in the Women's Premier League. Fair suffered a serious cruciate ligament injury in May 2008, which ruled her out of the following season.

== Personal life ==
Her work in the sport for development field has been ongoing since the age of 16. She is an athlete ambassador for Right To Play and Show Racism the Red Card. She also serves in the Sport Envoy Program run by the US State Department in conjunction with the US Soccer Federation, going on envoys abroad to promote healthy lifestyles, and sport for diplomacy.

Since 2015, Fair has been married to Jason Allen.

Since 2008, Fair has worked with several projects, such as Charlize Theron's Africa Outreach Project and her own Kickabout Africa 2010 project, to promote development efforts in Africa.

Fair, along with her twin sister Ronnie, is part of the ownership group of Angel City FC of the National Women's Soccer League.
