= Philadelphia Charge =

- Founded: April 10, 2000; Name established on November 2, 2000
- Dissolved: September 15, 2003
- Stadium: Villanova Stadium; Bryn Mawr, PA 19010
- Capacity: 12,500
- Owner: Comcast
- General Manager: Tim Murphy
- Head Coach: Mark Krikorian
- League: Women's United Soccer Association
- Final season 2003: 8th
Home colors	Away colors

The Philadelphia Charge was an American women's professional soccer team that played in the Women's United Soccer Association. The team played at Villanova Stadium on the campus of Villanova University near Philadelphia, Pennsylvania.

== History ==
In spring of 2000, the newly formed Women's United Soccer Association (WUSA) announced eight cities were granted franchises to start the league, including Philadelphia. Most of the inaugural teams were owned by major media companies, with the new Philadelphia club operated by locally headquartered Comcast Corporation who invested an initial $5 million into WUSA. In November 2000, the club's name and logo was officially announced as the Philadelphia Charge and would play home matches at Villanova Stadium. The logo for the Charge incorporated the Comcast Corp. "C" as part of its marketing efforts. The Charge began preparations for the first team with a 15-person front office and was supported by the Comcast-Spector organization for stadium operations, marketing, promotions, tickets, and merchandise.

By late 2000, the Charge had announced that University of Hartford women's soccer coach, Mark Krikorian, would be appointed the first head coach of the team. Prior to the start of the season, Krikorian would bring on former Swedish international Pia Sundhage and John Natale as assistant coaches.

The Philadelphia Charge conducting sports performance training at Aspiring Champions in King of Prussia, PA with certified sports trainers, Antonio Davis and Maine Prince. Both attending Penn State University and studied Exercise and Sports Science. Eventually after the team dissolved, Antonio Davis opened The Premiere Sports Academy in King of Prussia, PA. Sports Performance Trainer. Maine Prince, opened Philadelphia Sports Training Center in 2005, with his wife Justina Prince, a 2-time Academic All-American Soccer Player from Moravian University in Bethlehem, PA. The 85,000 square foot sports training facility located in Aston, PA was the premiere sports performance training facility for professional athletes, college athletes, high school athletes, and weekend warriors. Until sold in 2011 for over one billion dollars and is now the largest movie studio in Pennsylvania called Sun Center Studios. Following the sale of the building for Philadelphia Sports Training Center, Maine Prince opened a fulltime sports agency called Prince Management Group. The Philadelphia Charge was the city of Philadelphia's most recognizable sports venture conceived by the late, Ed Snider, owner of Comcast (as well as owner of the Philadelphia Flyers and Philadelphia Sixers - at that time).

=== 2001 season ===
The Charge would begin their first campaign led by American forward Lorrie Fair, German defender Doris Fitschen, and English forward Kelly Smith. Finishing the inaugural season in fourth, the Charge advanced to the WUSA semi-final playoff match, losing to Atlanta Beat 3–2.

=== 2002 season ===
Building on their first season, the Charge finished second in the standings for the regular season and lead the league in defense with fewest goals conceded (22). This season also featured the signing of Marinette Pichon, who lead the team in scoring and earning Most Valuable Player and Offensive Player of the Year awards. Similar to the first season, the Charge lost in the semi-finals, this time to Washington Freedom. Mark Krikorian also won WUSA Coach of the Year honors from the successful regular season.

=== 2003 season ===
The Charge's final season featured the team's worst record, finishing last (eighth) in the WUSA regular season standings. This season also began the career of future national team goalkeeper, Hope Solo, who made her professional debut in the Charge's first win of the season at New York Power.

== Stadium ==
The Charged played all their home matches at Villanova Stadium, located in Villanova, Pennsylvania. The 12,500 capacity stadium was the only WUSA stadium utilizing artificial turf. The Charge players, coaches and front office representatives took part in upgraded turf unveiling ahead of the 2002 season.

== Players ==
Several notable U.S. Women's National Team stars made their pro debuts with the Charge, including defender Heather Mitts (2001-2003) and goalkeeper Hope Solo, who appeared in 8 matches as a rookie backup goalkeeper in 2003. Other notables included French international Marinette Pichon, who won the 2002 WUSA Most Valuable Player award for the Charge, and English star Kelly Smith.

2003 Roster

Note: Flags indicate national team as defined under FIFA eligibility rules; some limited exceptions apply. Players may hold more than one non-FIFA nationality.

No.	Pos.	Nation	Player
1	GK	USA	Melissa Moore
2	MF	USA	Lorrie Fair
3	FW	USA	Emily Burt
5	DF	USA	Karyn Hall
6	DF	USA	Jenny Benson
7	MF	FIN	Anne Makinen
8	FW	ENG	Kelly Smith
9	MF	CZE	Pavlína Ščasná
10	FW	USA	Deliah Arrington
11	FW	FRA	Marinette Pichon

No.	Pos.	Nation	Player
12	MF	USA	Erin Misaki
13	DF	USA	Heather Mitts
14	MF	USA	Rachel Kruze
15	MF	USA	Stacey Tullock
16	MF	GER	Melanie Hoffmann
18	GK	USA	Hope Solo
19	DF	USA	Alexa Borisjuk
21	FW	USA	Trina Maso de Moya
22	MF	USA	Mary McVeigh
25	MF	USA	Jennifer Tietjen-Prozzo

Coach: Mark Krikorian

== Year-by-year ==
Year	League	Regular season	P	W	D	L	Pts	Playoffs	Top scorer	Avg. attendance
2001	WUSA	4th Place	21	9	4	8	31	Semi-Finals	(China) Liu Ailing (10)	7,153
2002	WUSA	2nd Place	21	11	6	4	39	Semi-Finals	(France) Marinette Pichon (14)	6,880
2003	WUSA	8th Place	21	5	5	11	20	Did not qualify	(France) Marinette Pichon (14)	6,764

== Awards ==
In 2001, Philadelphia Charge player, Doris Fitschen was named WUSA Defender of the Year.

In 2002, Philadelphia Charge player, Marinette Pichon was named WUSA's Most Valuable Player and Offensive Player of the Year and was the co-recipient with Mia Hamm for Goal of the Year for a scissor kick volley against the San Diego Spirit. Goalkeeper Melissa Moore was awarded Goalkeeper of the Year and Stacey Tullock was named Rookie of the Year. Coach Mark Krikorian took the honor of WUSA Coach of the Year the same year.

In 2003, the Charge was awarded the WUSA Team Fair Play Award and defender, Jenny Benson, was named WUSA Humanitarian of the Year.

== League Suspension ==
The Women's United Soccer Association announced on September 15, 2003 that it was suspending operations.

== See also ==
- Philadelphia Independence
- Women's Professional Soccer
- National Women's Soccer League
- Women's professional sports
- Women's association football
- List of soccer clubs in the United States
