= 2016 Big 12 Conference women's soccer season =

Big 12 Conference
- Season: 2016
- Champions: West Virginia
- Tournament Champion: West Virginia
- NCAA tournament: Kansas; Oklahoma; Oklahoma State; TCU; Texas Tech; West Virginia
- Matches: 154 (overall); 36 (conference)
- Average goals/game: 2.14 (conference)
- Top goalscorer: Michaela Abam (12 goals)

2016 Big 12 Conference women's soccer standings
	Conf.						Overall
Team	W		L		T	PCT	W		L		T	PCT
No. 2 West Virginia ‍†‍‡‍^{y}	8	–	0	–	0	1.000	23	–	2	–	2	.889
Kansas ‍‍‍^{y}	5	–	1	–	2	.750	11	–	6	–	4	.619
Baylor ‍‍‍	4	–	3	–	1	.563	12	–	7	–	1	.625
Oklahoma ‍‍‍^{y}	4	–	3	–	1	.563	14	–	7	–	2	.652
Iowa State ‍‍‍	3	–	4	–	1	.438	10	–	8	–	1	.553
Oklahoma State ‍‍‍^{y}	3	–	4	–	1	.438	9	–	9	–	3	.500
TCU ‍‍‍^{y}	2	–	5	–	1	.313	12	–	7	–	2	.619
Texas Tech ‍‍‍^{y}	2	–	6	–	0	.250	9	–	9	–	2	.500
Texas ‍‍‍	1	–	6	–	1	.188	8	–	9	–	1	.472
† – Conference champion ‡ – Tournament champion y – Invited to the NCAA tournament As of December 7, 2016; Rankings from NSCAA

The 2016 Big 12 Conference women's soccer season was the 21st season of women's varsity soccer in the conference.

The West Virginia Mountaineers are the defending regular season champions, and the Texas Tech Red Raiders are the defending tournament champions.

== Changes from 2015 ==
- Kansas State added a women's soccer program for the start of the 2016 season. The team will eventually join the conference at a time to be determined.

== Teams ==
=== Stadia and locations ===
Team	Location	Stadium	Capacity
Baylor Lady Bears	Waco, Texas	Betty Lou Mays Soccer Field	1,500
Iowa State Cyclones	Ames, Iowa	Cyclone Sports Complex	1,500
Kansas Jayhawks	Lawrence, Kansas	Rock Chalk Park	2,500
Oklahoma Sooners	Norman, Oklahoma	OU Soccer Complex	3,500
Oklahoma State Cowgirls	Stillwater, Oklahoma	Cowgirl Soccer Complex	1,450
TCU Horned Frogs	Fort Worth, Texas	Garvey-Rosenthal Soccer Stadium	1,500
Texas Longhorns	Austin, Texas	Mike A. Myers Stadium	20,000
Texas Tech Red Raiders	Lubbock, Texas	John Walker Soccer Complex	1,500
West Virginia Mountaineers	Morgantown, West Virginia	Dick Dlesk Soccer Stadium	1,650

== Regular season ==
=== Rankings ===
Legend
Increase in ranking
Decrease in ranking
Not ranked previous week

		Pre	Wk 2	Wk 3	Wk 4	Wk 5	Wk 6	Wk 7	Wk 8	Wk 9	Wk 10	Wk 11	Wk 12	Wk 13	Final
Baylor	C	–	–	–	–	–	–	–	–	–	24	–	–	–	–
Iowa State	C	–	–	–	–	–	–	–	–	–	–	–	–	–	–
Kansas	C	–	–	–	–	–	–	–	–	–	–	25	24	–	–
Oklahoma	C	–	–	–	–	–	–	23	22	–	–	24	–	25	–
Oklahoma State	C	–	–	–	–	–	–	–	–	–	–	–	–	–	–
TCU	C	–	–	–	–	–	–	–	–	–	–	–	–	–	–
Texas	C	–	–	–	–	–	–	–	–	–	–	–	–	–	–
Texas Tech	C	19	16	15	22	24	25	–	–	–	–	–	–	–	–
West Virginia	C	6	7	4	4	2	5	4	3	1	1	1	1	1	2

== Postseason ==
=== Big 12 tournament ===
==== Bracket ====
Quarterfinals; Wednesday, Nov. 2
1	West Virginia	3
8	Texas Tech	0
4	Oklahoma	2
5	Iowa State	0
2	Kansas	0
7	TCU	1
3	Baylor	1
6	Oklahoma State	0

Semifinals; Friday, Nov. 4
1	West Virginia	2
4	Oklahoma	0
7	TCU	3^{OT}
3	Baylor	2

Final; Sunday, Nov. 6
1	West Virginia	3^{OT}
7	TCU	2

=== NCAA tournament ===
Seed	Region	School	First Round	Second Round	Round of 16	Quarterfinals	Semifinals	Championship
1	WVU Region	West Virginia	Northern Kentucky, W 3–0	Ohio State, W 1–0 ^{2OT}	#4 UCLA, T 1–1 (4–2 PKs)	#3 Duke, W 1–0	#2 North Carolina, W 1–0	#2 USC, L 1–3
	SC Region	Kansas	Missouri, W 1–0 ^{2OT}	at #2 North Carolina, L 0–2	–	–	–	–
	SC Region	Oklahoma	SMU, W 1–0	vs. #4 BYU, L 1–2	–	–	–	–
	SC Region	Oklahoma State	at Colorado, L 1–3	–	–	–	–	–
	Florida Region	TCU	Texas A&M, L 0–1	–	–	–	–	–
	Florida Region	Texas Tech	at Utah, L 0–1	–	–	–	–	–

== All-Big 12 awards and teams ==
2016 Big 12 Women's Soccer Individual Awards
Award	Recipient(s)
Offensive Player of the Year	Michaela Abam, WVU; Courtney Dike, Oklahoma State
Defensive Player of the Year	Kadeisha Buchanan, WVU
Coach of the Year	Nikki Izzo-Brown, WVU
Freshman of the Year	Cyera Hintzen, Texas

2016 Big 12 Women's Soccer All-Conference Teams
First Team	Second Team	Rookie Team
GK – Lauren Watson, Texas Tech, Sr. D – Rachel Ressler, OU, Sr. D – Kadeisha Buchanan, WVU, Sr. * D – Amandine Pierre-Louis, WVU, Jr. MF – Julie James, Baylor, So. MF – Ashley Lawrence, WVU, Sr. * MF – Carla Portillo, WVU, Jr. F – Grace Hagan, Kansas, So. F – Courtney Dike, OSU, Sr. F – Michaela Abam, WVU, Jr. U – Emma Heckendorn, TCU, Jr.	GK – Rylee Foster, WVU, Fr. D – Kayla Morrison, Kansas, Jr. D – Paige Welch, OU, So. D – Natalie Calhoun, OSU, Sr. MF – Tayler Estrada, Kansas, Sr. MF – Hanna Kallmaier, Kansas, Sr. MF – Jemma Cota, Oklahoma, Sr. MF – Gwennie Puente, TX Tech, So. F – Liz Keester, Oklahoma, Sr. F – Michelle Prokof, TCU, Sr. F – Cyera Hintzen, Texas, Fr. U – Lauren Piercy, Baylor, So. U – Tori Bowman, Oklahoma, Jr.	GK – Rylee Foster, WVU; D – Addisyn Merrick, Kansas; D – Cachet Lue, TCU; MF – Hannah Cade, Iowa St; MF – Kristina O'Donnell, OU; MF – Jaci Jones, OSU; MF – Jordie Harr, Texas Tech * F – Raegan Padgett, Baylor; F – Katie McClure, Kansas * F – Cyera Hintzen, Texas * F – Jade King, Texas Tech *
* Unanimous Selection, GK – Goalkeeper, D – Defender, MF – Midfielder, F – Forward, U – Utility

== See also ==
- 2016 NCAA Division I women's soccer season
- 2016 Big 12 Conference Women's Soccer Tournament
