= List of Women's Soccer Academic All-America Team Members of the Year =

Student athlete award

The Women's Soccer Academic All-America Team Member of the Year is the annual most outstanding singular college soccer athlete of the set of female soccer athletes selected for the Academic All-America Teams in a given year.

== Tables of winners ==
Key
†	Indicates winners of the all-sports Academic All-America award.

All winners are American unless indicated otherwise.

Women's Soccer Academic All-America Team Members of the Year
- Awarded for: The yearly outstanding men's college soccer Academic All-America team member
- Country: United States and Canada
- Presented by: College Sports Communicators

History
- Most recent: Jasmine Aikey, Stanford; Anna Lantz, Rockhurst; Natalie Barnouw, MIT; Katie Koger, Marian
- Next ceremony: 2026
- Website: Official site

=== Two-division era (2001–2010) ===
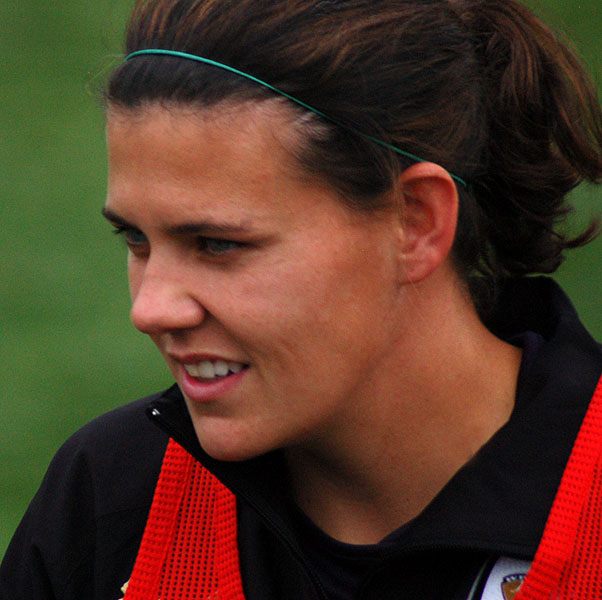
Christine Sinclair (pictured in 2009), 2005 winner

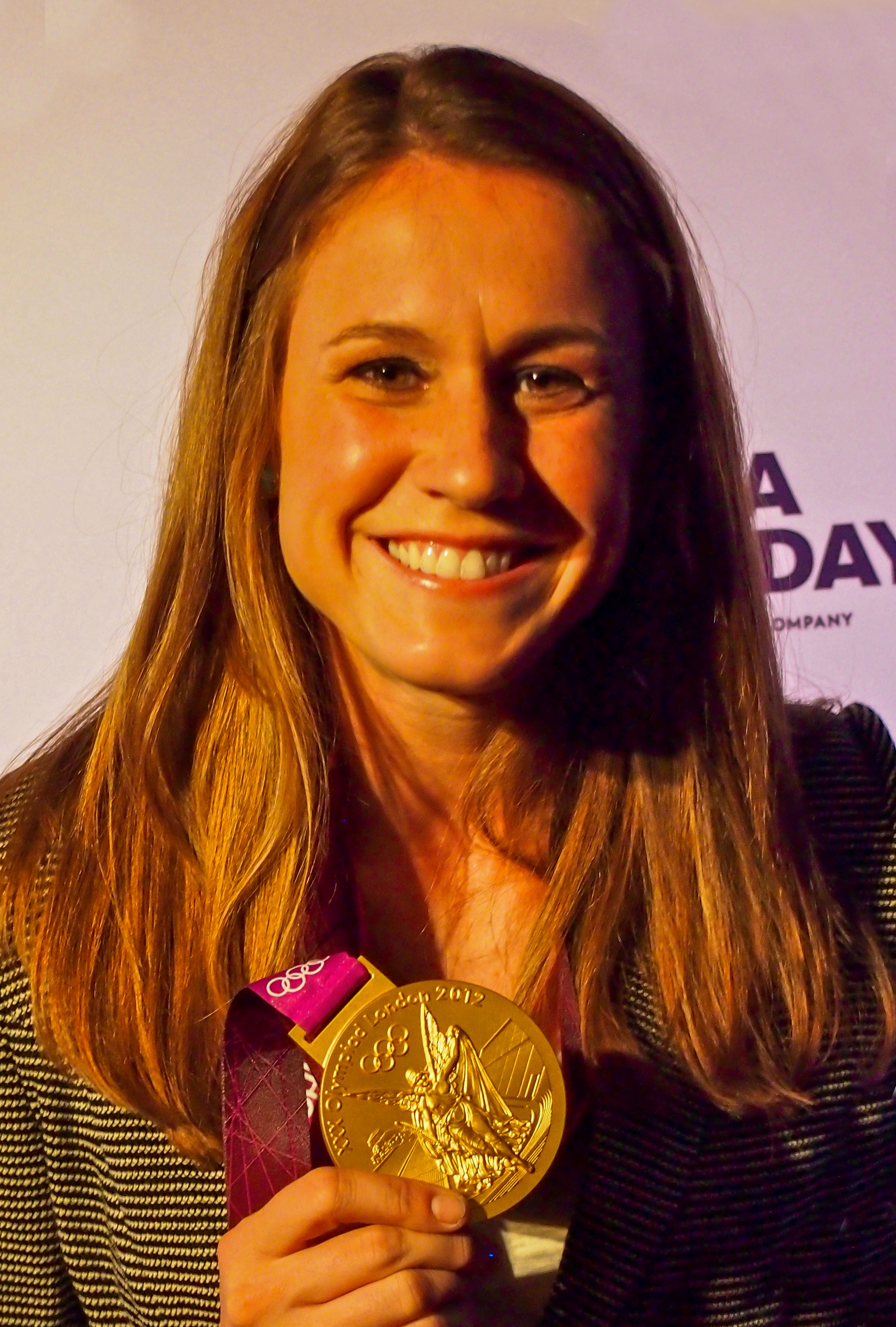
Heather O'Reilly (pictured in 2012), 2006 winner

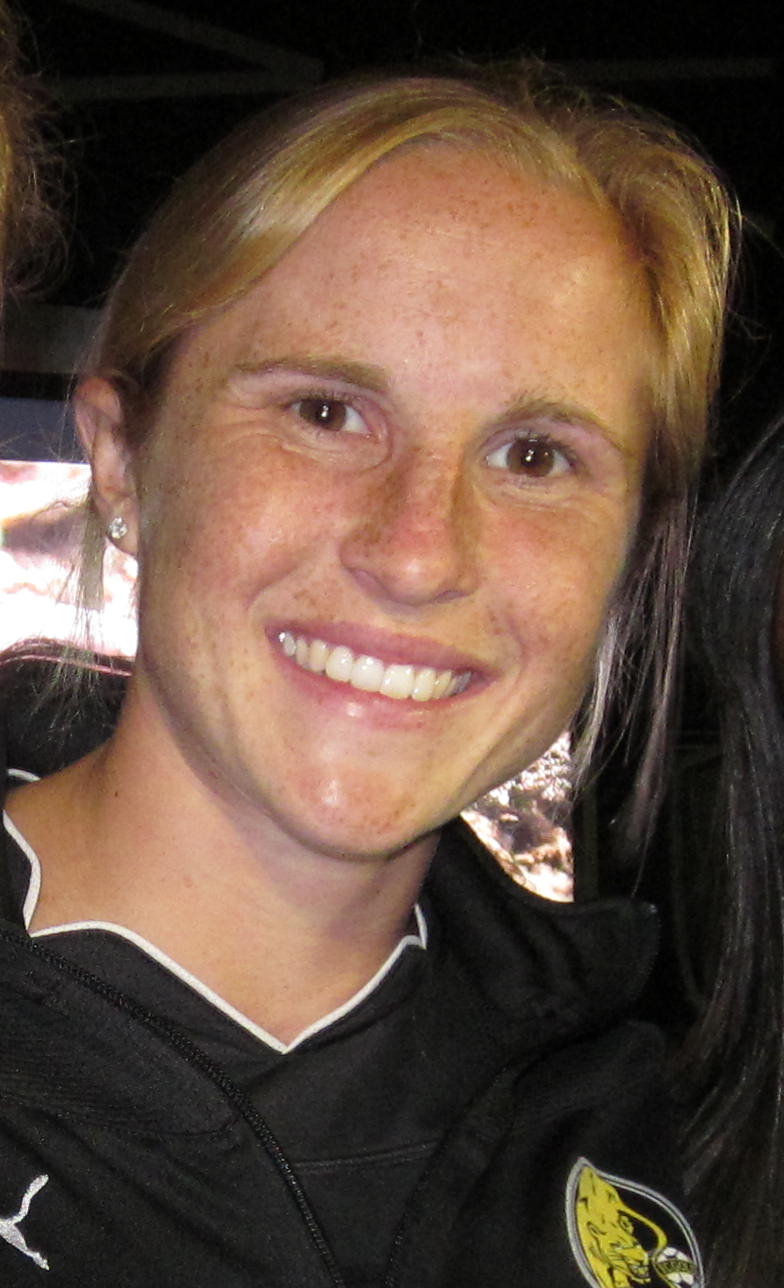
Rachel Van Hollebeke (pictured in 2010), 2007 winner

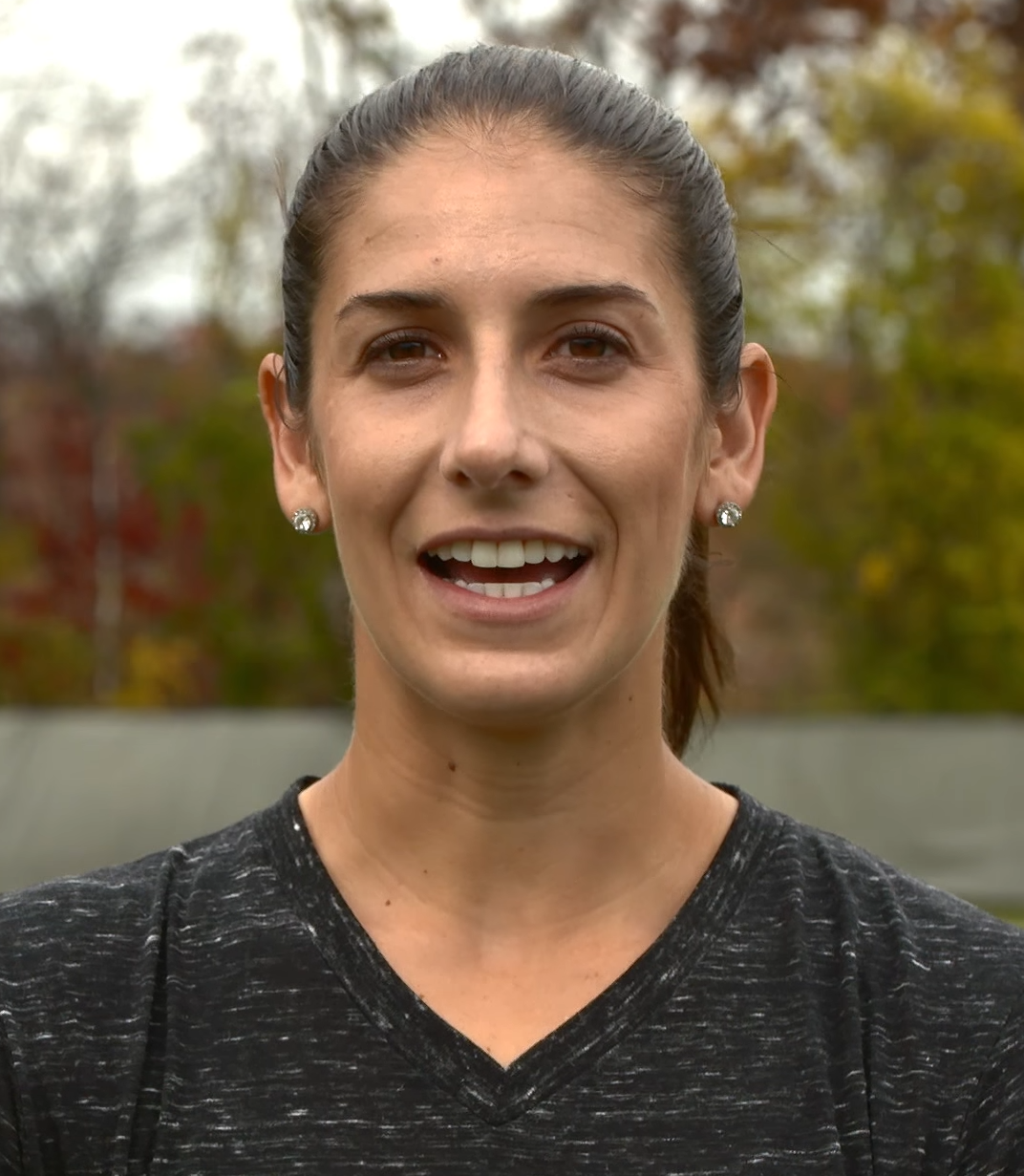
Yael Averbuch West (pictured in 2015), 2008 winner

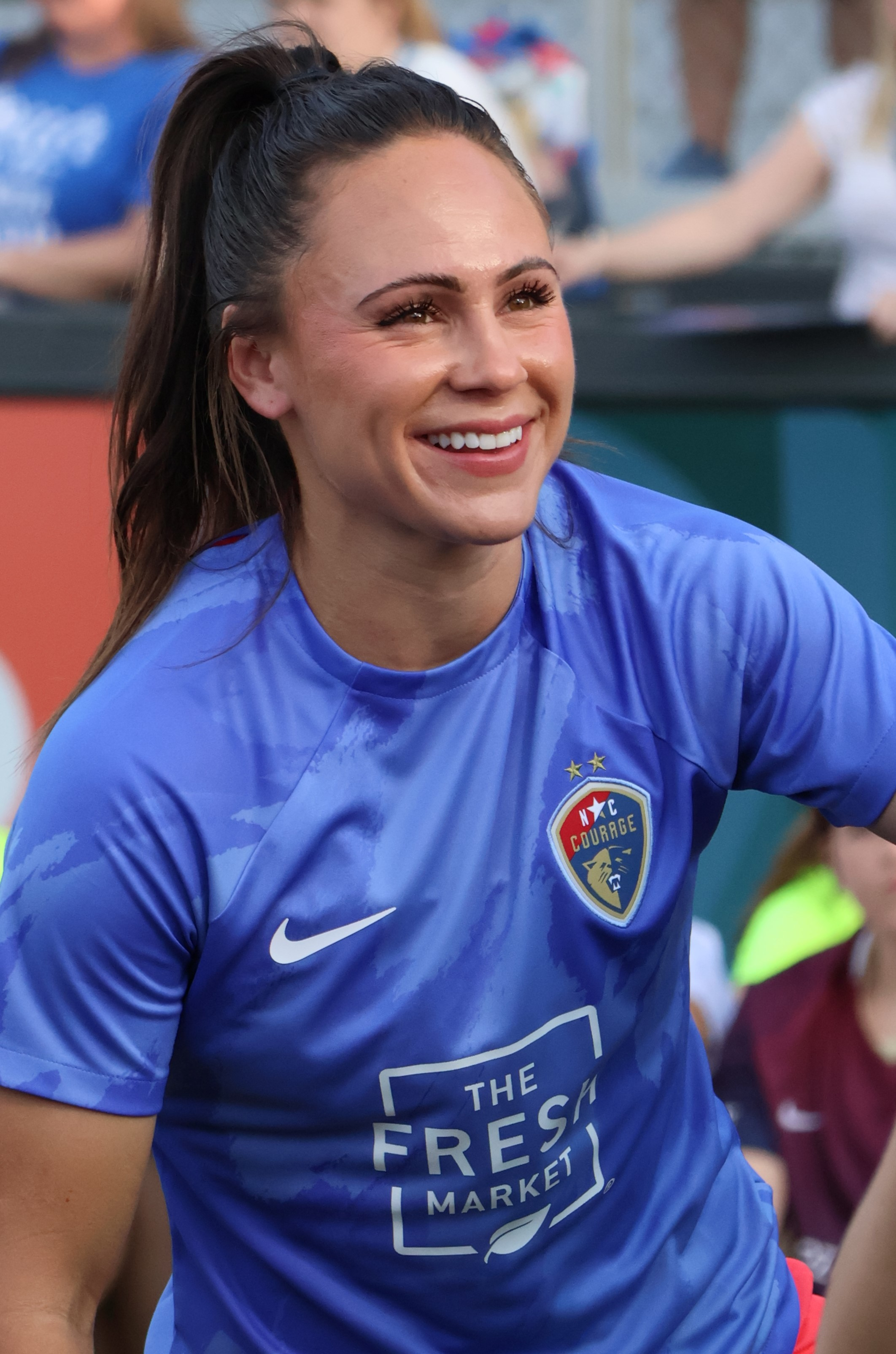
Bianca St-Georges (pictured in 2024), 2018 winner

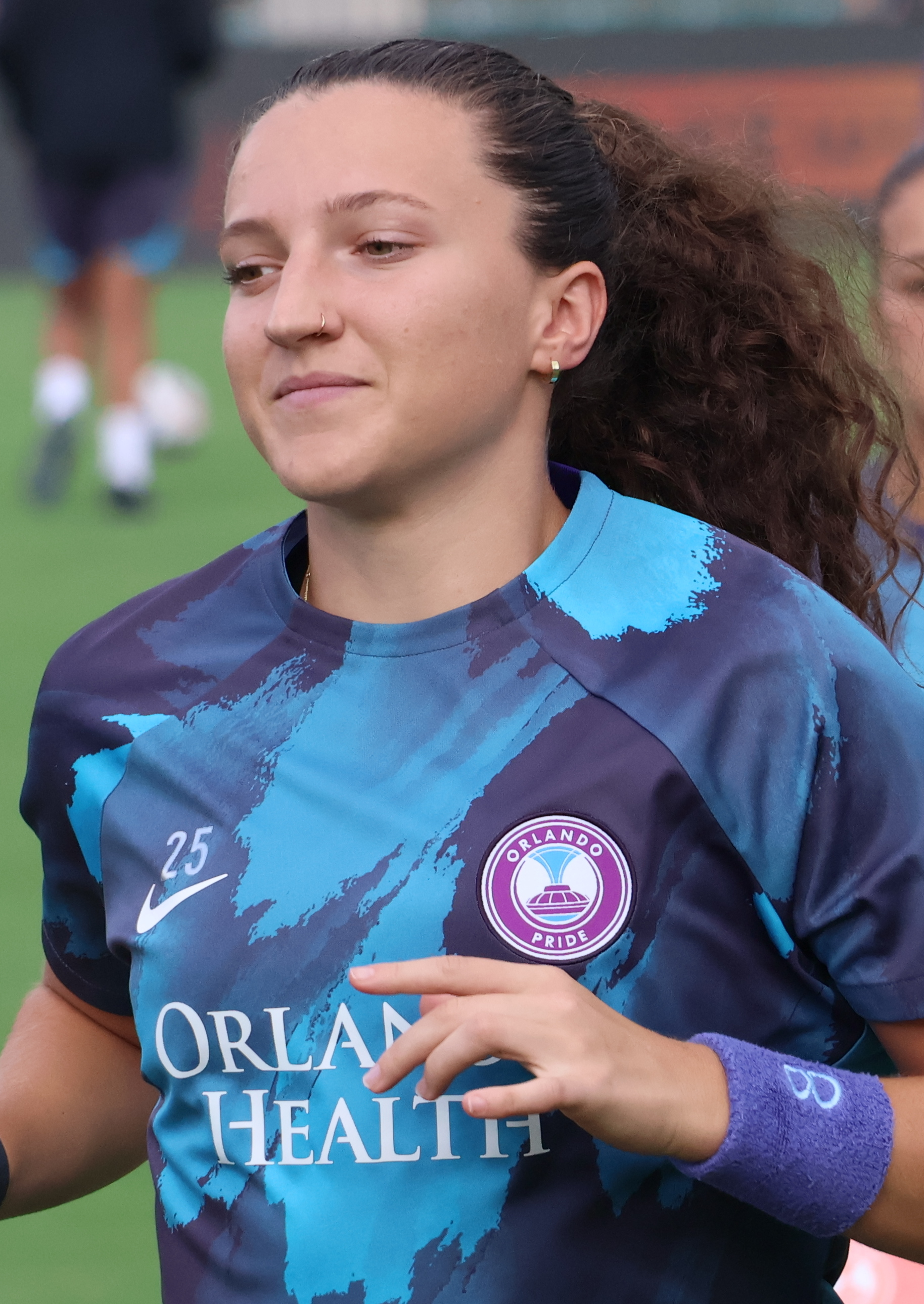
Kerry Abello (pictured in 2024), 2020-21 and 2021 winner

Women's Soccer Academic All-America Team Members of the Year (2001–2010)
Year	University Division		College Division	
Year	Winner	School	Winner	School
2001	Andi Sellers	Florida	Andrea Pawliczek	Emory
2002	(Germany) Katharina Lindner	Hartford	Sarah Ridley	William Penn
2003	Vanessa Pruzinsky	Notre Dame	Jenny Bruce	Wisconsin–Stevens Point
2004	Katy Cross	Penn	Jackie Sassaman	Waynesburg
2005	(Canada) Christine Sinclair	Portland	Sarah Wall	Ohio Wesleyan
2006	Heather O'Reilly	North Carolina	Katrina Morgan	Embry-Riddle
2007	Rachel Buehler	Stanford	Sarah Richardson	Wheaton (IL)
2008	Yael Averbuch	North Carolina	(Canada) Katy Tafler	Grand Valley State
2009	Beth Reed	Navy	(Canada) Natalja Stanski	Grand Valley State
2010	Kristi Andreassen	Northern Arizona	Tara Carter	Otterbein

=== Four-division era (2011–present) ===
Women's Soccer Academic All-America Team Members of the Year (2011–present)
Year	Division I		Division II		Division III		College/NAIA (Note: College Division, 2011–2017; NAIA, 2018–present)	
Year	Winner	School	Winner	School	Winner	School	Winner	School
2011	Krista Lopez	Oklahoma State	Ashley Botts	Grand Valley State	Courtney Chadburn	Castleton State	Jamie Achten	Lee (TN)
2012	Dana Larsen	Baylor	Megan Woodworth	Colorado Mines	Elaine Gerry	Edgewood	(Sweden) Mia Persson	Lindsey Wilson
2013	Frances Silva	West Virginia	Karanee Demery	Cal State Stanislaus	Emily Jorgens	Trinity (TX)	Jessica Ralph	Campbellsville
2014	Stephanie Verdoia	Seattle	(Canada) Vanessa Consiglio	Ursuline (OH)	Emily Jorgens	Trinity (TX)	Amanda Roden	Taylor
2015	Megan Kufeld	Washington	Haley Hatcher	Ouachita Baptist	Nicci Bermudes	Aurora (IL)	Annie Kessler	Ottawa(KS)
2016	Kathryn Sloan	Louisiana Tech	Maylyn Parsons	Columbus State	Kami Jones	Hardin-Simmons	Emma Cuda	Friends
2017	Meghan Hegarty	Navy	Gabriella Mencotti	Grand Valley State	Kenne Kessler	Hardin-Simmons	Bethany Balcer	Spring Arbor
2018	(Canada) Bianca St-Georges	West Virginia	Anna Fobbe	Bemidji State	Kenne Kessler	Hardin-Simmons	Bethany Balcer	Spring Arbor
2019	Kate Del Fava	Illinois State	(Germany) Charlène Nowotny	Flagler	Shannon Reagan	Maryville (TN)	(Germany) Nina Haeberlin	Keiser
2020–21 (Note: Officially designated as "2020–21" awards; most college soccer competition was played in spring 2021.)	Kerry Abello	Penn State	(Sweden) Sara Sandberg	Flagler	Bella Shivley	Otterbein	Samantha Tracey	Spring Arbor
2021	Kerry Abello	Penn State	Hannah Kelley-Lush	West Texas A&M	Maya Nielan	MIT	Ana Paula Santos	William Carey
2022	Felicia Knox	Alabama	Jenny Vetter	Minnesota State	Jenn Rennich	Westfield State	Mackenzie Selvius	Spring Arbor
2023	Bea Franklin	Arkansas	(Sweden) Isabelle Navren	Embry-Riddle	Julia Beck	Misericordia	Ariana Stoltzfus	Spring Arbor
2024	Maddy Anderson	Mississippi State	Anna Lantz	Rockhurst	Elle Sutter	North Central	(Japan) Marina Nawa	UT Southern
2025	Jasmine Aikey†	Stanford	Anna Lantz	Rockhurst	Natalie Barnouw	MIT	Katie Koger	Marian
