= 2014 FC Kansas City season =

FC Kansas City
2014 season
- Owner: Brian Budzinski, Chris Likens, Brad Likens, Greg Likens
- Head coach: Vlatko Andonovski
- Stadium: Durwood Soccer Stadium
- NWSL: 2nd
- NWSL Playoffs: Champions
- Top goalscorer: League: Amy Rodriguez (13); All: Amy Rodriguez (16)
- Highest home attendance: 3,107 (Apr 12 vs. SBFC)
- Lowest home attendance: 1,212 (Aug 6 vs. BOS)
- Average home league attendance: 2,018
Home colors	Away colors

The 2014 season was FC Kansas City's second season of existence. The team competed in the National Women's Soccer League (NWSL), the top division of women's soccer in the United States. FC Kansas City won its first NWSL championship in 2014, defeating Seattle Reign FC in the NWSL Playoffs final.

== Club ==
=== Roster ===
As of July 1, 2014

No.	Pos.	Nation	Player
1	GK	(United States) USA	Sara Keane
2	FW	(United States) USA	Melissa Henderson
4	DF	(United States) USA	Becky Sauerbrunn
5	FW	(United States) USA	Liz Bogus
6	MF	(United States) USA	Jen Buczkowski
7	MF	(United States) USA	Jenna Richmond
8	FW	(United States) USA	Amy Rodriguez
9	MF	(United States) USA	Merritt Mathias
10	FW	(United States) USA	Frances Silva
11	MF	(United States) USA	Morgan Marlborough
12	FW	(United States) USA	Lauren Holiday
13	DF	(United States) USA	Leigh Ann Robinson
14	DF	(United States) USA	Kassey Kallman
15	MF	(United States) USA	Erika Tymrak
16	DF	(United States) USA	Nia Williams
17	DF	(United States) USA	Amy LePeilbet
18	GK	(United States) USA	Nicole Barnhart
19	FW	(Australia) AUS	Katrina Gorry
20	MF	(United States) USA	Molly Dreska
22	GK	(Mexico) MEX	Cecilia Santiago
23	DF	(United States) USA	Nikki Phillips
24	FW	(United States) USA	Sarah Hagen
25	MF	(United States) USA	Mandy Laddish
28	MF	(United States) USA	Missy Geha

=== Team management ===
FC Kansas City's ownership group is composed of Chris, Brad and Greg Likens, and Brian Budzinski. The group also owns the Missouri Comets of the Major Indoor Soccer League. Budzinski is also owner of the Kansas City Soccerdome. Vlatko Andonovski, a former professional player and head coach of the Kansas City Kings of the PASL and Missouri Olympic Development Program (ODP), was head coach for the 2013 season.

== Match results ==
Win Draw Loss

=== Preseason ===
March 22, 2014 1	FC Kansas City	1–1	Chicago Red Stars	Fenton, Missouri
19:00 CDT	Henderson 83'	Report	Mautz 51'	Stadium: St. Louis Soccer Park; Attendance: 2,300

March 29, 2014 2	Kansas Jayhawks	1–3	FC Kansas City	Lawrence, Kansas
	Ashley Williams 31'	Report	Rodriguez 12'; Holiday 15', 51' (pen.)	Stadium: Jayhawk Soccer Complex

April 5, 2014 3	Oklahoma State Cowgirls	0–10	FC Kansas City	Kansas City, Missouri
16:00 CDT		http://www.fckansascity.com/2014/04/05/fc-kansas-city-finishes-exhibition-season-big-win/ Report	Williams 14'; Mathias 23', 25', 58'; Tymrak 30'; Bogus 33' (pen.), 40'; Silva 48', 68'; Henderson 60' (pen.)	Stadium: Swope Park

=== NWSL ===
==== Regular season ====
Kickoff times are in CDT (UTC-05)

April 12, 2014 1	FC Kansas City	1–1	Sky Blue FC	Kansas City, Missouri
	Rodriguez 42' (Kallman)	Report	Freels 48'	Stadium: Durwood Soccer Stadium; Attendance: 3,107; Referee: Dimitar Chavdarov

April 19, 2014 2	Washington Spirit	3–1	FC Kansas City	Boyds, Maryland
	Matheson 4', 38' (Dunn); Nairn 45'	Report	Rodriguez 29'; Kallman (yellow card) 32'	Stadium: Maryland SoccerPlex; Attendance: 2,577; Referee: Matthew Franz

April 26, 2014 3	Portland Thorns FC	3–1	FC Kansas City	Portland, Oregon
	Long 44' (pen.); McDonald 84' (Long), 88' (Shim)	Report	Mathias (yellow card) 63'; Holiday 56' (pen.)	Stadium: Providence Park; Attendance: 14,124; Referee: Katja Koroleva

April 30, 2014 4	FC Kansas City	1–0	Chicago Red Stars	Kansas City, Missouri
21:00 CDT (UTC-05)	Rodriguez 9' (Buczkowski)	Report		Stadium: Durwood Soccer Stadium; Attendance: 1,679; Referee: Josh Wilkens

May 3, 2014 5	Houston Dash	0–4	FC Kansas City	Houston, Texas
19:00	Ohale (red card) 58'; Hein (yellow card) 72'	Box; Report	Bogus 13'; Rodriguez 48' (Holiday); Tymrak 80'; Silva 89' (Holiday)	Stadium: BBVA Compass Stadium; Attendance: 5,198; Referee: Juliana Duncan

May 7, 2014 6	Western New York Flash	2–1	FC Kansas City	Rochester, New York
18:00	Kerr 38' (Adriana); Spencer 45+4' (Kerr)	Box; Report	Marlborough 57'	Stadium: Sahlen's Stadium; Attendance: 2,463; Referee: Mark Allatin

May 11, 2014 7	FC Kansas City	2–1	Washington Spirit	Kansas City, Missouri
18:00	Rodriguez 36' (Buczkowski), 64' (Holiday)	Report	Gayle (yellow card) 50'; Adams 63' (Matheson)	Stadium: Durwood Soccer Stadium; Attendance: 1,797; Referee: Matt Mercier

May 14, 2014 8	Seattle Reign FC	3–2	FC Kansas City	Seattle, Washington
21:00	Fletcher 16'; Little 20' (pen.); Fishlock (yellow card) 52'; Winters 76' (Dallstream)	Box; Report	Holiday 44' (pen.); Tymrak 61' (Richmond)	Stadium: Memorial Stadium; Attendance: 2,875; Referee: Timon Berry

May 18, 2014 9	FC Kansas City	2–2	Houston Dash	Kansas City, Missouri
17:00	Holiday 2' (Tymrak); Tymrak 36'; Phillips (yellow card) 80'	Box; Report	Jackson 20' (Burger); Burger (yellow card) 65'; McCarty 78' (Masar); Ohale (yellow card) 90'	Stadium: Durwood Soccer Stadium; Attendance: 1,483; Referee: Elvis Mahmutovic

May 21, 2014 10	FC Kansas City	1–1	Seattle Reign FC	Kansas City, Missouri
20:00	Richmond (yellow card) 18'; Rodriguez 42' (Bogus)	Box; KC report	Winters (yellow card) 34'; Little 45+1' (pen.); Barnes (yellow card) 78'	Stadium: Durwood Soccer Stadium; Attendance: 2,011; Referee: Dimitar Chavdarov

May 25, 2014 11	Boston Breakers	0–2	FC Kansas City	Boston, Massachusetts
19:00		Box; Report; Report	Phillips 62'; Rodriguez 82' (Buczkowski)	Stadium: Harvard Stadium; Attendance: 2,622; Referee: Katja Koroleva

June 4, 2014 12	FC Kansas City	1–0	Western New York Flash	Kansas City, Missouri
19:00	Rodriguez 45' (Robinson)	Report	Losada (yellow card) 11'	Stadium: Durwood Soccer Stadium; Attendance: 2,674; Referee: Chris Spivey

June 7, 2014 13	FC Kansas City	2–0	Boston Breakers	Kansas City, Missouri
19:00	Holiday 14' (pen.), 35' (pen.)	Report		Stadium: Durwood Soccer Stadium; Attendance: 1,457; Referee: Greg Dopka

June 14, 2014 14	Houston Dash	1–2	FC Kansas City	Houston, Texas
20:00	Edwards 79' (Ochs)	Report	Richmond 66' (Tymrak); Silva 90+4' (Tymrak)	Stadium: BBVA Compass Stadium; Attendance: 3,852; Referee: Bernard Hosu

June 21, 2014 15	FC Kansas City	1–0	Chicago Red Stars	Kansas City, Missouri
19:00 CDT (UTC-05)	Buczkowski 76' (Mathias)	Report	van Egmond (yellow card) 83'	Stadium: Durwood Soccer Stadium; Attendance: 1,493; Referee: Christina Unkel

June 28, 2014 16	FC Kansas City	1–0	Portland Thorns FC	Kansas City, Missouri
19:00	Holiday 41' (Rodriguez)	Report	Brooks (yellow card) 50'	Stadium: Durwood Soccer Stadium; Attendance: 2,421; Referee: Josh Wilkens

July 6, 2014 17	Sky Blue FC	0–5	FC Kansas City	Piscataway, New Jersey
18:00	Nadim (yellow card) 78'	Report	Tymrak 2' (Robinson); Holiday 9'; Hagen 20' (Tymrak), 42' (Holiday); Rodriguez 90+1' (Bogus)	Stadium: Yurcak Field; Attendance: 1,349; Referee: Margaret Domka

July 13, 2014 18	Portland Thorns FC	7–1	FC Kansas City	Portland, Oregon
19:00	Boquete 3' (Morgan), 74' (pen.); Morgan 15' (Catley); Long 43' (Sinclair), 62' (Boquete); Heath (yellow card) 70'; Sinclair 80' (Boquete); Brooks 88' (Shim)	Report	Gorry 30' (Rodriguez); Richmond (yellow card) 40'; LePeilbet (yellow card) 42'; Buczkowski (yellow card) 87'	Stadium: Providence Park; Attendance: 9,672; Referee: Christina Unkel

July 18, 2014 19	Western New York Flash	1–1	FC Kansas City	Rochester, New York
19:30	Kerr 22' (Lloyd); Lloyd (yellow card) 41'	Report	Hagen 17' (Holiday) (yellow card) 84'; Sauerbrunn (yellow card) 90'	Stadium: Sahlen's Stadium; Attendance: 2,916; Referee: Elvis Mahmutovic

July 27, 2014 20	FC Kansas City	2–1	Sky Blue FC	Kansas City, Missouri
17:00	Rodriguez 34' (Holiday); Holiday 70' (Silva)	Box; KC report	Foord (yellow card) 69'; Nadim 87'	Stadium: Durwood Soccer Stadium; Attendance: 1,852; Referee: Josh Wilkens

July 30, 2014 21	Washington Spirit	2–1	FC Kansas City	Boyds, Maryland
17:00	Garefrekes 49' (De Vanna); Nairn 67' (De Vanna)	Report	Sauerbrunn 18' (Hagen)	Stadium: Maryland SoccerPlex; Attendance: 2,744; Referee: Kristen Salazar

August 2, 2014 22	FC Kansas City	1–1	Seattle Reign FC	Kansas City, Missouri
19:00	Rodriguez 6' (Holiday); LePeilbet (yellow card) 46'	Report	Rapinoe 68'; Nogueira (yellow card) 86'	Stadium: Durwood Soccer Stadium; Attendance: 3,029; Referee: Bernard Hosu

August 6, 2014 23	FC Kansas City	2–1	Boston Breakers	Kansas City, Missouri
19:00	Rodriguez 8' (Richmond); Hagen 26' (Rodriguez)	Report	O'Reilly 16' (pen.)	Stadium: Durwood Soccer Stadium; Attendance: 1,212; Referee: David Mon

August 9, 2014 24	Chicago Red Stars	2–1	FC Kansas City	Lisle, Illinois
19:00	Tancredi 9'; Press 40' (Hemmings)	Report	Marlborough 43' (Mathias)	Stadium: Benedictine U. Sports Complex Stadium; Attendance: 2,111; Referee: Katja Koroleva

==== Regular-season standings ====
Pos	Team	Pld	W	D	L	GF	GA	GD	Pts	Qualification
1	Seattle Reign FC	24	16	6	2	50	20	+30	54	NWSL Shield
2	FC Kansas City (C)	24	12	5	7	39	32	+7	41	NWSL Playoffs
3	Portland Thorns FC	24	10	6	8	39	35	+4	36	NWSL Playoffs
4	Washington Spirit	24	10	5	9	36	43	−7	35	NWSL Playoffs
5	Chicago Red Stars	24	9	8	7	32	26	+6	35	
6	Sky Blue FC	24	9	7	8	30	37	−7	34	
7	Western New York Flash	24	8	4	12	42	38	+4	28	
8	Boston Breakers	24	6	2	16	37	53	−16	20	
9	Houston Dash	24	5	3	16	23	44	−21	18	

Source: NWSL
Rules for classification: Tiebreakers
(C) Champions

==== Results summary ====
Overall								Home						Away					
Pld	W	D	L	GF	GA	GD	Pts	W	D	L	GF	GA	GD	W	D	L	GF	GA	GD
24	12	5	7	39	32	+7	41	8	4	0	17	8	+9	4	1	7	22	24	−2

Last updated: July 19, 2014.
Source: Match reports

Round	1	2	3	4	5	6	7	8	9	10	11	12	13	14	15	16	17	18	19	20	21	22	23	24
Stadium	H	A	A	H	A	A	H	A	H	H	A	H	H	A	H	H	A	A	A	H	A	H	H	A
Result	D	L	L	W	W	L	W	L	D	D	W	W	W	W	W	W	W	L	D	W	L	D	W	L

Updated to match(es) played on August 30, 2014. Source: Match reports
A = Away; H = Home; W = Win; D = Draw; L = Loss

=== NWSL Championship Playoffs ===
==== Semi-final ====
August 23, 2014
12:00 (CDT)
Semi-final

FC Kansas City	2–0	Portland Thorns FC
Rodriguez 65' (Holiday); Phillips (yellow card) 84'; Holiday 87' (Hagen)	Report	Menges (yellow card) 22'

Durwood Soccer Stadium, Kansas City, Missouri
Attendance: 2,997
Referee: Chris Spivey

==== Championship ====
August 31, 2014
12:00 (PDT)
Final

Seattle Reign FC	1–2	FC Kansas City
Rapinoe 86' (Winters); Solo (yellow card) 90+3'	Report; Report; Report	Rodriguez 23' (Holiday), 56' (Holiday); LePeilbet (yellow card) 79'

Starfire Sports Stadium, Tukwila, Washington
Attendance: 4,252
Referee: Margaret Domka

== Squad statistics ==
Note: only regular season squad statistics displayed.

Key to positions: FW – Forward, MF – Midfielder, DF – Defender, GK – Goalkeeper

N	Pos	Player	GP	GS	Min	G	A	WG	Shot	SOG	Cro	CK	Off	Foul	FS	YC	RC
5	FW	Liz Bogus	13	8	598	1	2	1	12	7	0	0	2	2	5	0	0
6	MF	Jen Buczkowski	24	24	2087	1	3	1	11	5	1	0	1	22	15	2	0
20	MF	Molly Dreska	1	0	52	0	0	0	0	0	0	0	0	0	1	0	0
28	MF	Missy Geha	1	0	21	0	0	0	0	0	0	0	0	0	0	0	0
19	FW	Katrina Gorry	9	3	376	1	0	0	17	8	0	3	1	5	2	0	0
22	FW	Sarah Hagen	9	7	529	4	1	1	16	10	0	0	5	3	8	1	0
2	FW	Melissa Henderson	5	3	185	0	0	0	2	1	0	0	3	0	1	0	0
12	MF	Lauren Holiday	21	21	1766	8	7	3	56	35	5	96	11	14	36	0	0
14	DF	Kassey Kallman	18	18	1479	0	1	0	4	2	1	0	1	12	9	1	0
25	MF	Mandy Laddish	2	0	15	0	0	0	0	0	0	0	0	0	0	0	0
17	DF	Amy LePeilbet	11	4	512	0	0	0	1	0	0	0	0	5	1	2	0
11	FW	Morgan Marlborough	9	2	247	2	0	0	6	5	0	0	5	2	2	0	0
9	MF	Merritt Mathias	20	16	1436	0	2	0	21	10	1	2	4	17	15	1	0
23	DF	Nikki Phillips	23	23	1970	1	0	1	2	2	0	0	0	14	2	1	0
7	MF	Jenna Richmond	22	20	1754	1	4	0	14	7	1	0	0	17	12	2	0
13	MF	Leigh Ann Robinson	23	23	2012	0	2	0	8	5	2	0	2	5	4	0	0
8	FW	Amy Rodriguez	22	21	1808	13	3	3	71	38	1	0	19	15	16	0	0
4	DF	Becky Sauerbrunn	22	22	1935	1	0	0	4	3	1	2	0	5	3	1	0
10	FW	Frances Silva	18	5	568	2	1	1	10	5	0	2	3	5	14	0	0
15	FW	Erika Tymrak	21	18	1540	4	4	1	43	20	1	5	2	7	33	0	0
16	DF	Nia Williams	5	2	260	0	0	0	2	0	0	0	0	4	3	0	0

N	Pos	Goal keeper	GP	GS	Min	W	L	T	Shot	SOG	Sav	GA	GA/G	Pen	PKF	SO
18	GK	Nicole Barnhart	22	22	1935	11	6	5	210	100	71	29	1.318	5	5	8
1	GK	Sarah Keane	2	2	180	1	1	0	19	11	9	3	1.500	0	0	0
