= Steel City Sparks =

Defunct women's soccer team from Pittsburgh, US

- Full name: Steel City Sparks S.C.
- Nickname: Sparks F.C.
- Founded: 2003
- Dissolved: 2005
- Stadium: CONSOL Energy Park
- Capacity: 3,000
- Chairman: Suzanne Lucas
- Manager: Chuck Etta Blaire Gantz Randi Sheller
- League: Women's Premier Soccer League
| Home colors | Away colors |

The Steel City Sparks was an American women's soccer team based in Pittsburgh, Pennsylvania. The team was a member of the Women's Premier Soccer League, the third tier of women's soccer in the United States and Canada.

== Overview ==
The Sparks formed in 2003 to develop soccer for women in the Pittsburgh area. Their first coach was Erik Ingram. The squad was composed of former WUSA, W-League, and international players, including Annie Lowry, Katie Barnes, Chrissie Abbott and Lisa Stoia. Home games were played at the Ellis Athletic Field. In 2005, the team left the league, and the franchise was terminated.

Seasons
| Year | Division | League | Reg. season | Playoffs |
|---|---|---|---|---|
| 2003 | | | | |
| 2004 | | | | |
| 2005 | 2 | WPSL | 2nd, East | National Semi Finals (4th) |
