= 2013 Big 12 Conference women's soccer tournament =

- Classification: Division I
- Teams: 8
- Matches: 7
- Attendance: 2,787
- Site: Swope Soccer Village; Kansas City, Missouri
- Champions: West Virginia (1st title)
- Winning coach: Nikki Izzo-Brown (1st title)
- Broadcast: Fox Sports 1 (Final only)

2013 Big 12 Conference women's soccer standings
	Conf.						Overall
Team	W		L		T	PCT	W		L		T	PCT
No. 12 West Virginia ‍†‍‡‍^{y}	7	–	1	–	0	.875	16	–	4	–	3	.761
No. 17 Texas Tech ‍‍‍^{y}	6	–	0	–	2	.875	18	–	2	–	3	.848
Texas ‍‍‍	5	–	2	–	1	.688	12	–	6	–	2	.650
Iowa State ‍‍‍	3	–	4	–	1	.438	9	–	9	–	2	.500
Baylor ‍‍‍	3	–	4	–	1	.438	11	–	6	–	3	.625
Oklahoma State ‍‍‍^{y}	2	–	3	–	3	.438	9	–	7	–	6	.545
TCU ‍‍‍	2	–	5	–	1	.313	6	–	10	–	3	.395
Kansas ‍‍‍	2	–	5	–	1	.313	7	–	11	–	2	.400
Oklahoma ‍‍‍	1	–	7	–	0	.125	4	–	13	–	1	.250
† – Conference champion ‡ – Tournament champion y – Invited to the NCAA Tournament; Rankings from NSCAA Coaches

The 2013 Big 12 Conference women's soccer tournament was the postseason women's soccer tournament for the Big 12 Conference held on November 6, 8 and 10, 2014. The seven-match tournament was held at the Swope Soccer Village in Kansas City, Missouri with a combined attendance of 2,787. The 8-team single-elimination tournament consisted of three rounds based on seeding from regular season conference play. The West Virginia Mountaineers defeated the Oklahoma State Cowgirls in the championship match to win their first conference tournament since joining the league.

== Regular season standings ==
Place	Seed	Team	Conference					Overall			
Place	Seed	Team	W	L	T	%	Pts	W	L	T	%
1	1	West Virginia	7	1	0	.875	21	16	4	3	.761
2	2	Texas Tech	6	0	2	.875	20	18	2	3	.848
3	3	Texas	5	2	1	.688	16	12	6	2	.650
4	4	Iowa State	3	4	1	.438	10	9	9	2	.500
4	5	Baylor	3	4	1	.438	10	11	6	3	.625
6	6	Oklahoma State	2	3	3	.438	9	9	7	6	.545
7	7	TCU	2	5	1	.313	7	6	10	3	.395
7	8	Kansas	2	5	1	.313	7	7	11	2	.400
9		Oklahoma	1	7	0	.125	3	4	13	1	.250

== Bracket ==
Quarterfinals; Wednesday, Nov 6
1	West Virginia	3
8	Kansas	0
4	Iowa State	0
5	Baylor	1
2	Texas Tech	1
7	TCU	0
3	Texas	1
6	Oklahoma State	2

Semifinals; Friday, Nov 8
1	West Virginia	1
5	Baylor	0
2	Texas Tech	0
6	Oklahoma State	1

Final; Sunday, Nov 10
1	West Virginia	1
6	Oklahoma State	0

== Awards ==
=== Most valuable player ===
- Offensive MVP – Frances Silva – West Virginia
- Defensive MVP – Kadeisha Buchanan – West Virginia

=== All-Tournament team ===
Position	Player	Team
GK	Sara Keane	West Virginia
D	Jaelene Hinkle	Texas Tech
D	Natalie Calhoun	Oklahoma State
D	Kadeisha Buchanan	West Virginia
MF	Paige Strahan	Texas Tech
MF	Ashley Lawrence	West Virginia
MF	Allie Stephenson	Oklahoma State
F	Janine Beckie	Texas Tech
F	Courtney Dike	Oklahoma State
F	Frances Silva	West Virginia
F	Madison Mercado	Oklahoma State
