= Lisa Stoia =

American soccer player

Personal information
- Full name: Lisa Marie Stoia
- Date of birth: August 28, 1982 (age 44)
- Place of birth: Shirley, New York, U.S.
- Height: 5 ft 6 in (1.68 m)
- Position: Midfielder

College career
Years	Team	Apps	(Gls)
2000–2003	West Virginia Mountaineers		

Senior career*
Years	Team	Apps	(Gls)
2004	Steel City Sparks	5	(1)
2005–2006	Boston Renegades	23	(13)
2009	Saint Louis Athletica	12	(0)

International career^{‡}
2003	United States U-21		

Managerial career
- 2005–2006: Jacksonville Dolphins
- 2007–2012: West Virginia Mountaineers (assistant)
- 2013–2016: West Virginia Mountaineers (associate head coach)
- 2017–: West Virginia Mountaineers (senior associate head coach)
- * Club domestic league appearances and goals as of 22:16, 30 September 2009 (UTC) ‡ National team caps and goals as of 22:16, 30 September 2009 (UTC)

Lisa Marie Stoia (born August 28, 1982) is an American former professional soccer midfielder and coach who is currently the senior associate head coach for the West Virginia Mountaineers women's soccer team.
