= Sara Keane =

American soccer player (born 1991)

Personal information
- Full name: Sara Keane
- Date of birth: June 7, 1991 (age 35)
- Place of birth: Mount Laurel, New Jersey, United States
- Height: 1.75 m (5 ft 9 in)
- Position: Goalkeeper

College career
Years	Team	Apps	(Gls)
2009–2013	West Virginia Mountaineers	65	(0)

Senior career*
Years	Team	Apps	(Gls)
2014	FC Kansas City	2	(0)
- * Club domestic league appearances and goals

Sara Keane (born June 7, 1991) is an American former soccer player.

== Early life ==
Keane grew up in Mount Laurel, New Jersey and played high school soccer at Bishop Eustace Preparatory School.

== Club career ==
She played as a goalkeeper for FC Kansas City.

== Personal life ==
She is currently a high-ranking account manager at Ewing Sports.

== Career statistics ==
Appearances and goals by club, season and competition
Club	Season	League			Playoffs (Note: Includes NWSL playoffs)		Total	
Club	Season	Division	Apps	Goals	Apps	Goals	Apps	Goals
FC Kansas City	2014	NWSL	2	0	0	0	2	0
Career total			2	0	0	0	2	0

== Honors ==
FC Kansas City

- National Women's Soccer League: 2014
