= Kayza Massey =

Canadian soccer player (born 2000)

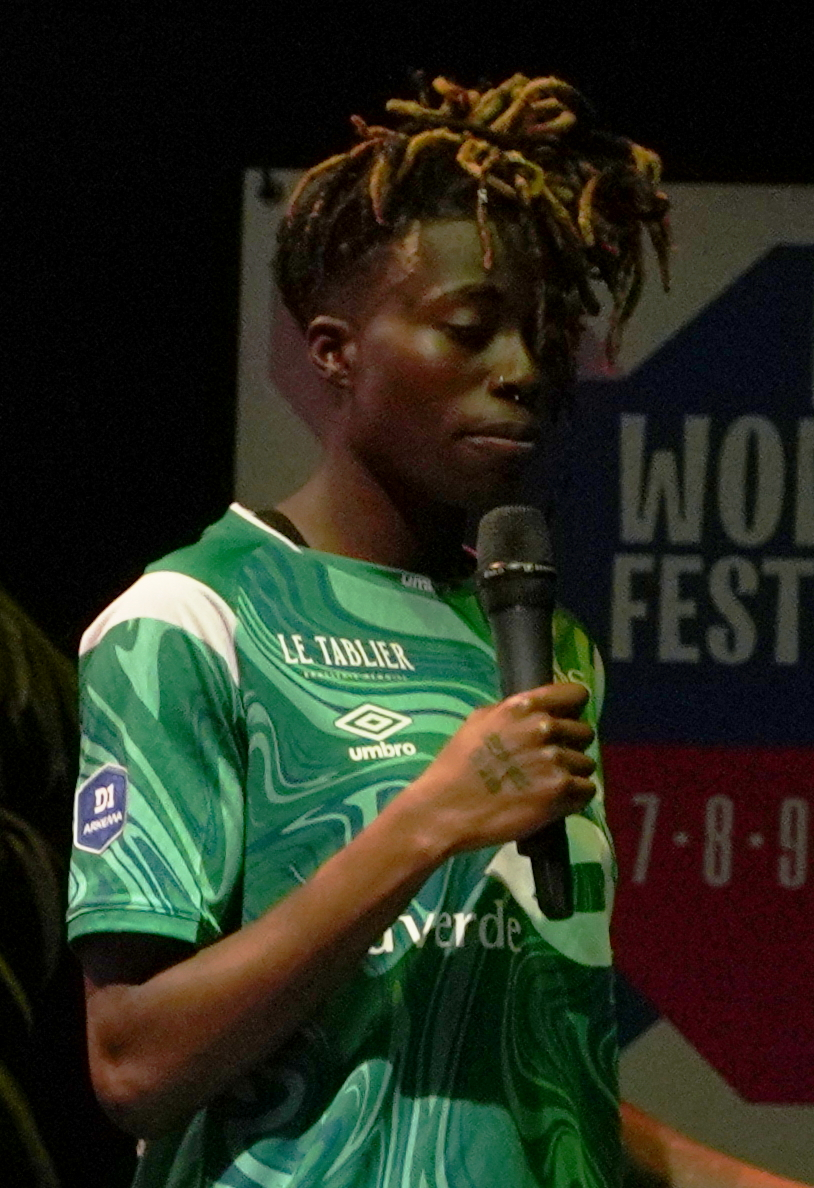
- Massey in 2024

Personal information
- Full name: Kayza Ayine Ka-A Massey
- Date of birth: February 2, 2001 (age 25)
- Place of birth: Walewale, Ghana
- Height: 1.74 m (5 ft 9 in)
- Position: Goalkeeper

Team information
- Current team: Reims

Youth career
- 2006–2015: Ottawa Gloucester Hornets
- 2015–2017: Ottawa South United
- 2017–2019: NDC Ontario

College career
Years	Team	Apps	(Gls)
2019–2023	West Virginia Mountaineers	76	(0)

Senior career*
Years	Team	Apps	(Gls)
2024–	Reims	1	(0)

International career^{‡}
2016	Ghana U17	4	(0)
2018	Canada U17	1	(0)
2019	Canada U18	1	(0)
2020	Canada U20	2	(0)
- * Club domestic league appearances and goals as of November 2, 2024 ‡ National team caps and goals as of February 29, 2020

Kayza Ayine Ka-A Massey (born February 2, 2001) is a professional soccer player who plays as a goalkeeper for French club Reims in the Première Ligue. Born in Ghana, she represents Canada at international level.

== Early life ==
Massey was born in Walewale, Ghana and raised in an orphanage, until being adopted as a one-month old by a Canadian woman who was working in Ghana with UNICEF. She was raised in Ottawa, Canada and began playing youth soccer with the Ottawa Gloucester Hornets, before later joining Ottawa South United in 2015. In November 2017, she began playing with the Ontario EXCEL program. In 2017, she played for Team Ontario at the 2017 Canada Summer Games, winning a silver medal.

== College career ==
In 2019, Massey began attending West Virginia University, where she played for the women's soccer team. She made her collegiate debut on September 12, 2019, against the Stony Brook Seawolves. At the end of her freshman season, she was named to the Academic All-Big 12 Rookie Team.

In the 2020–21 season, she became the team's starting goalkeeper. She was named to the Academic All-Big 12 First Team at the end of the season.

Ahead of her third season, she was named to the Preseason All-Big 12 Team. In October 2021, she was named the Big 12 Goalkeeper of the Week. In October 2021, she was named the Big 12 Goalkeeper of the Week and the United Soccer Coaches' Women's Player of the Week. At the end of the season, she was named to the All-Big 12 Second Team and the Academic All-Big 12 First Team.

In September 2022, she was again named the Big 12 Goalkeeper of the Week and the United Soccer Coaches' Women's Player of the Week. At the end of the 2022 season, she was named to the All-Big 12 First Team and was named the Big 12 Co-Goalkeeper of the Year. She was also named to the All-Midwest Region Third Team.

Ahead of the 2023 season, she was named to the All-Big 12 Preseason Team. Over her five seasons with West Virginia, appeared in 76 games with 72 starts and also ranks fourth on the all-time list in both minutes played (6620) and shutouts (28).

== Club career ==
In January 2024, Massey signed a professional contract with French club Reims in the Première Ligue through the end of the 2023–24 season.

== International career ==
In 2016, Massey was named to the Ghana U17 roster for the 2016 FIFA U-17 Women's World Cup.

In 2018, she switched international allegiances to begin representing Canada. In November 2018, she was called up to the Canadian national program for the first time for a camp with the Canada U17 team. She was then subsequently named to the roster for the 2018 FIFA U-17 Women's World Cup.
