= Amandine Pierre-Louis =

Haitian footballer (born 1995)

Personal information
- Date of birth: 18 February 1995 (age 31)
- Place of birth: Montreal, Quebec, Canada
- Height: 1.70 m (5 ft 7 in)
- Positions: Defender; winger

Team information
- Current team: Montreal Roses FC
- Number: 28

Youth career
- AS St-Léonard

College career
Years	Team	Apps	(Gls)
2013–2017	West Virginia Mountaineers	92	(14)

Senior career*
Years	Team	Apps	(Gls)
2013–2015	Laval Comets		
2018–2019	Sky Blue FC	14	(0)
2019–2020	Metz	2	(0)
2021	Slavia Prague	8	(1)
2021–2022	AaB	12	(0)
2022–2023	Rodez	15	(1)
2023–2026	Saint-Étienne	40	(5)
2026–	Montreal Roses FC	3	(1)

International career^{‡}
2012	Canada U-17	8	(2)
2014	Canada U-20	2	(0)
2023–	Haiti	19	(1)
- * Club domestic league appearances and goals as of 10 September 2026 ‡ National team caps and goals as of 29 July 2026

Amandine Pierre-Louis (born 18 February 1995) is a professional soccer player who plays as a defender and winger for Northern Super League club Montreal Roses FC. Born in Canada, she represented the country at youth level before switching to the Haiti women's national team in 2023.

Pierre-Louis played college soccer for the West Virginia Mountaineers, reaching the 2016 NCAA College Cup final and sharing Big 12 Conference Defensive Player of the Year honours in 2017. Sky Blue FC selected her sixth overall in the 2018 NWSL College Draft, making her the highest-drafted Quebec player in National Women's Soccer League (NWSL) history. After two seasons in New Jersey, she spent six years in Europe with clubs in France, the Czech Republic and Denmark, including three seasons in France's Première Ligue with Saint-Étienne, before returning home to join Montreal Roses in 2026.

Pierre-Louis played for Canada at the 2012 FIFA U-17 Women's World Cup and the 2014 FIFA U-20 Women's World Cup, and attended a senior training camp in 2017. She has represented Haiti since 2023, scoring her first international goal in 2024.

== Early life and youth career ==
Pierre-Louis was born in Montreal and began playing soccer with AS St-Léonard. She attended École secondaire Antoine-de-Saint-Exupéry in Montreal and was named Quebec's player of the year in 2011. She developed through Canada Soccer's national performance centre in Quebec under coach Rudy Doliscat before playing for Canada's youth national teams.

== College career ==
Pierre-Louis enrolled at West Virginia University in 2013 and redshirted her first season. Recruited as a forward, she was converted to a fullback at West Virginia, a change she later said required her to accept that she would not be perfect straight away. In 2014, she started 14 of her 21 appearances, scoring three goals, and was named to the All-Big 12 Newcomer Team. She played in 22 matches as a substitute in 2015, scoring four goals.

In 2016, Pierre-Louis started all 27 of West Virginia's matches, recording two goals and five assists, and was named to the All-Big 12 first team as the Mountaineers reached the College Cup final for the first time. As a senior in 2017, she started all 22 matches and scored five goals, two of them match-winners, and was named the Big 12's co-Defensive Player of the Year. She finished her college career with 92 appearances and 14 goals.

Between college seasons, Pierre-Louis kept up her fitness with the Laval Comets in the USL W-League.

== Club career ==
=== Sky Blue FC ===
Pierre-Louis fractured her tibia in November 2017, weeks before the NWSL draft. Sky Blue FC nonetheless selected her sixth overall in the 2018 NWSL College Draft, making her the second Canadian chosen in the first round and the highest-drafted Quebec player in NWSL history. She was expected to join the club in March 2018 after completing her rehabilitation.

In a 2022 profile, Pierre-Louis described her time at the club as difficult. She said Sky Blue had not arranged permanent housing for her; after a planned host family fell through, she declined a proposal to stay in the general manager's home and instead lived with a former West Virginia teammate's family, commuting about 90 minutes each way to training. She also described a lack of a dedicated home ground, which the team shared with Rutgers University, and changing facilities limited to a trailer with a single shower. Similar conditions at the club, including unsuitable housing arrangements, long unpaid commutes and inadequate facilities at Rutgers, were widely reported in 2018, and forward Sam Kerr said publicly that the players "deserve better". Pierre-Louis said the club went through three head coaches during her time there and that she felt some lineup decisions reflected front-office preferences rather than performance. General manager Tony Novo left the club in April 2019.

=== Metz ===
Pierre-Louis then moved to France to join FC Metz, saying it had always been her ambition to play in the country. She spent six months with the club, but her spell was cut short when she tore her anterior cruciate ligament around February 2020, and she returned home when the COVID-19 pandemic began. She later said that delays in obtaining French health coverage left her paying for early medical appointments herself, that she arranged her own transport to rehabilitation after surgery, and that she organized remote physiotherapy during the first months of the pandemic.

=== Slavia Prague ===
After recovering from the injury, Pierre-Louis signed a six-month contract with Czech club Slavia Prague in February 2021. She later said the less intense league, which she described as having only two competitive teams, helped her return to regular football after her knee injury.

=== AaB ===
Pierre-Louis spent the following year with Danish club AaB. She praised the quality of play and the working environment in Denmark, and said AaB tried to give its women's team the same opportunities as its men's side, though she also described the difficulty of being a player of colour in a largely homogeneous country.

=== Rodez ===
In November 2022, Rodez announced Pierre-Louis as its seventh signing of the season for the Division 1 Féminine, on a contract until 2023. Visa delays held up her first appearance, but by January 2023 she had become a regular starter on the wing as the club fought relegation. She left Rodez in the summer of 2023, as the club prepared for the following season in the second division.

=== Saint-Étienne ===
Pierre-Louis joined Saint-Étienne in November 2023, wanting to return to the French top flight. Before signing a contract on 24 January 2024, she had scored twice in a Coupe de France Féminine match against Toulouse and scored the only goal in a league win over Fleury. Trained as a forward but used in a more defensive role, she scored five goals in her first season as Saint-Étienne secured their top-flight status, and in June 2024 she extended her contract until 2026. The club avoided relegation again in April 2025 with a late draw against Strasbourg.

=== Montreal Roses ===
On 29 July 2026, Pierre-Louis returned to Canada to sign with Northern Super League club Montreal Roses FC. Sporting director Marinette Pichon cited her experience, leadership and versatility, and Pierre-Louis said that playing professionally in her home city had always been a dream. She scored her first goal for the club on 10 September 2026, in a 2–2 draw with AFC Toronto.

== International career ==
=== Canada ===
Pierre-Louis represented Canada at youth level. She was part of the under-17 team that won silver at the 2012 CONCACAF Women's U-17 Championship and played at the 2012 FIFA U-17 Women's World Cup in Azerbaijan. She was named to Canada's under-20 squad for the 2014 FIFA U-20 Women's World Cup, which Canada hosted. She received her first call-up to the senior national team for a training camp in Los Angeles in January 2017, but did not earn a senior cap. Pierre-Louis later said that her 2020 knee injury affected her chances of a senior call-up at the time.

=== Haiti ===
Pierre-Louis was eligible to switch her international allegiance to Haiti through her Haitian father. In June 2023, she was named to Haiti's provisional squad. She was selected that October for Haiti's CONCACAF W Gold Cup qualifiers against Saint Kitts and Nevis. On 23 October 2024, she scored her first international goal, putting Haiti ahead 2–1 before half-time in a 4–2 win over Jordan at the Pink Ladies Cup in Turkey. By July 2026, she had earned 19 caps for Haiti.

== Views on women's football ==
Pierre-Louis has spoken about racism in the game, saying she has heard generalizing remarks from coaching staff about Black players and has felt isolated as one of relatively few Black women playing professionally in some of the countries where she has been based. She has also criticized coaches' comments on players' weight that are unrelated to performance, saying such remarks, alongside body standards promoted on social media, can contribute to eating disorders among athletes. She has called for more women in leadership positions in football and for continued advocacy by current and former players, citing the founding of Angel City FC as a positive example, and has said that public support from male athletes, as seen in the WNBA, could benefit women's soccer.

== International goals ==
Scores and results list Haiti's goal tally first.

No.	Date	Venue	Opponent	Score	Result	Competition	Ref.
1.	23 October 2024	Arslan Zeki Demirci Sports Complex, Antalya, Turkey	Jordan	2–1	4–2	Pink Ladies Cup	

== Honours ==
West Virginia Mountaineers

- NCAA College Cup runner-up: 2016
- Big 12 Conference women's soccer tournament: 2014, 2016

Canada U-17

- CONCACAF Women's U-17 Championship runner-up: 2012

Individual

- Big 12 Conference co-Defensive Player of the Year: 2017
- All-Big 12 first team: 2016
- All-Big 12 Newcomer Team: 2014
- United Soccer Coaches All-American: 2016, 2017
