= Bryanna McCarthy =

Canadian soccer player

Personal information
- Full name: Bryanna Ashley McCarthy
- Date of birth: October 13, 1991 (age 35)
- Place of birth: Toronto, Ontario, Canada
- Height: 1.55 m (5 ft 1 in)
- Position: Defender

College career
Years	Team	Apps	(Gls)
2009–2012	West Virginia Mountaineers		

Senior career*
Years	Team	Apps	(Gls)
2009–2010	Toronto Lady Lynx	16	(4)
2013	Western New York Flash	1	(0)
2014	Ottawa Fury	12	(0)
2015	SC Sand	1	(0)
2015–2018	BV Cloppenburg	37	(3)

International career^{‡}
2008	Canada U17	9	(0)
2010	Canada U20	5	(1)
2010–2013	Canada	6	(0)
- * Club domestic league appearances and goals as of December 6, 2015 ‡ National team caps and goals as of June 20, 2013

Bryanna Ashley McCarthy, also known as Bry McCarthy, (born October 13, 1991) is a Canadian professional soccer player and member of the Canada women's national soccer team. She last played for German club BV Cloppenburg in the 2. Bundesliga.

== Early life ==
Born in Toronto, Ontario, McCarthy's mother was born in Saint Vincent and the Grenadines while her father was born in Jamaica. She grew up in Ajax playing basketball, volleyball, track, soccer and golf with her and her fathers' personal coach Karim Corringham.

=== West Virginia University ===
McCarthy attended West Virginia University.

== Playing career ==
=== Club career ===
On January 11, 2013, as part of the NWSL Player Allocation, McCarthy joined the Western New York Flash. Despite this, McCarthy only played 15 minutes for the Flash and her allocation was not picked up for the following year.

In 2014, McCarthy signed with the Ottawa Fury in the W-League. She signed for German Bundesliga club SC Sand in 2015, and then later for 2. Bundesliga club BV Cloppenburg.

=== International career ===
In 2006, McCarthy was 14 years old when she made her debut in the Canadian youth program. She won a bronze medal at the 2008 CONCACAF Women's Under-17 Championship and represented Canada at the FIFA U-17 Women's World Cup in New Zealand the same year. In June 2010, she made her debut for Canada's senior team at just 18 years old. She finished fourth with Canada at the 2010 CONCACAF Under-20 Women's Championship in Guatemala. In 2011, she finished first with Canada at the 2011 Cyprus Cup. In 2012, she finished second with Canada at the 2012 Cyprus Cup.

== Coaching career ==
After retiring from playing, McCarthy returned to the United States to became a graduate coach at West Virginia University, before moving to Saint Louis University as an assistant coach.
