= Rachel Kruze =

Retired American soccer player

Personal information
- Date of birth: August 11, 1981 (age 45)
- Place of birth: Webster, New York, United States
- Height: 5 ft 7 in (1.70 m)
- Positions: Defender; midfielder

College career
Years	Team	Apps	(Gls)
1999–2002	West Virginia Mountaineers		

Senior career*
Years	Team	Apps	(Gls)
2003	Philadelphia Charge	15	(0)
2004–2005	ÍBV		
- * Club domestic league appearances and goals

Rachel Kruze (born August 11, 1981, in Webster, New York) is a retired American soccer player who played for the Philadelphia Charge.

== Early life and education ==
Kruze was born in Webster, New York on August 11, 1981. She graduated from Webster High School, then West Virginia University.

== Career ==
From 1999 to 2002, while attending West Virginia University, Kruze played for the university's soccer team.

In 2003, Kruze was selected in the fourth round of the Women's United Soccer Association's (WUSA) college draft to play for the Philadelphia Charge. At the end of the season, the WUSA collapsed, after which Kruze played for ÍBV women's football.
