= 2016 Big 12 Conference women's soccer tournament =

Collegiate women's soccer tournament

- Classification: Division I
- Teams: 8
- Matches: 7
- Site: Swope Soccer Village; Kansas City, Missouri
- Champions: West Virginia (3rd title)
- Winning coach: Nikki Izzo-Brown (3rd title)
- Broadcast: Fox Sports 1 (Final only)

2016 Big 12 Conference women's soccer standings
	Conf.						Overall
Team	W		L		T	PCT	W		L		T	PCT
No. 2 West Virginia ‍†‍‡‍^{y}	8	–	0	–	0	1.000	23	–	2	–	2	.889
Kansas ‍‍‍^{y}	5	–	1	–	2	.750	11	–	6	–	4	.619
Baylor ‍‍‍	4	–	3	–	1	.563	12	–	7	–	1	.625
Oklahoma ‍‍‍^{y}	4	–	3	–	1	.563	14	–	7	–	2	.652
Iowa State ‍‍‍	3	–	4	–	1	.438	10	–	8	–	1	.553
Oklahoma State ‍‍‍^{y}	3	–	4	–	1	.438	9	–	9	–	3	.500
TCU ‍‍‍^{y}	2	–	5	–	1	.313	12	–	7	–	2	.619
Texas Tech ‍‍‍^{y}	2	–	6	–	0	.250	9	–	9	–	2	.500
Texas ‍‍‍	1	–	6	–	1	.188	8	–	9	–	1	.472
† – Conference champion ‡ – Tournament champion y – Invited to the NCAA tournament As of December 7, 2016; Rankings from NSCAA

The 2016 Big 12 Conference women's soccer tournament was the postseason women's soccer tournament for the Big 12 Conference, held from November 2 to 6, 2016. The seven-match tournament was played at the Swope Soccer Village in Kansas City, Missouri. The eight team single-elimination tournament consisted of three rounds based on seeding from regular season conference play. The West Virginia Mountaineers claimed their third Big 12 tournament title after defeating the TCU Horned Frogs in overtime in the championship match

== Regular season standings ==
Place	Seed	Team	Conference					Overall			
Place	Seed	Team	W	L	T	%	Pts	W	L	T	%
1	1	West Virginia	8	0	0	1.000	24	23	2	2	.889
2	2	Kansas	5	1	2	.750	17	11	6	4	.619
3	3	Baylor	4	3	1	.563	13	12	7	1	.625
3	4	Oklahoma	4	3	1	.563	13	14	7	2	.652
5	5	Iowa State	3	4	1	.438	10	10	8	1	.553
5	6	Oklahoma State	3	4	1	.438	10	9	9	3	.500
7	7	TCU	2	5	1	.313	7	12	7	2	.619
8	8	Texas Tech	2	6	0	.250	6	9	9	2	.500
9		Texas	1	6	1	.188	4	8	9	1	.472

== Bracket ==
Quarterfinals; Wednesday, Nov. 2
1	West Virginia	3
8	Texas Tech	0
4	Oklahoma	2
5	Iowa State	0
2	Kansas	0
7	TCU	1
3	Baylor	1
6	Oklahoma State	0

Semifinals; Friday, Nov. 4
1	West Virginia	2
4	Oklahoma	0
7	TCU	3^{OT}
3	Baylor	2

Final; Sunday, Nov. 6
1	West Virginia	3^{OT}
7	TCU	2

== Schedule ==
=== Quarterfinals ===
November 2, 2016	#1 West Virginia	3–0	#8 Texas Tech	Kansas City, Missouri
12:30 p.m. EST	Sh'Nia Gordon 15'; Heather Kaleiohi 57'; Carla Portillo 59'	Report		Stadium: Swope Soccer Village; Referee: Richonne Clark

November 2, 2016	#4 Oklahoma	2–0	#5 Iowa State	Kansas City, Missouri
3:00 p.m. EST	Liz Keester 74' (pen.); Madison Saliba 76'	Report		Stadium: Swope Soccer Village; Referee: Katja Koroleva

November 2, 2016	#2 Kansas	0–1	#7 TCU	Kansas City, Missouri
6:30 p.m. EST		Report	Allison Ganter 51'	Stadium: Swope Soccer Village; Referee: Lance VanHaitsma

November 2, 2016	#3 Baylor	1–0	#6 Oklahoma State	Kansas City, Missouri
9:00 p.m. EST	De Lima 21'	Report		Stadium: Swope Soccer Village; Referee: Tim Debysingh

=== Semifinals ===
November 4, 2016	#1 West Virginia	2–0	#4 Oklahoma	Kansas City, Missouri
5:30 p.m. EST	Grace Cutler 41'; Sh'Nia Gordon 90'	Report		Stadium: Swope Soccer Village; Referee: Jose DaSilva

November 4, 2016	#7 TCU	3–2 (a.e.t.)	#3 Baylor	Kansas City, Missouri
8:00 p.m. EST	Allison Ganter 72'; Faith Carter 74'; Meghan Murphy 98'	Report	Julie James 9'; Amanda Hoglund 26'	Stadium: Swope Soccer Village; Referee: Richonne Clark

=== Final ===
November 6, 2016	#1 West Virginia	3–2 (a.e.t.)	#7 TCU	Kansas City, Missouri
3:30 p.m. EST	Michaela Abam 59'; Kadeisha Buchanan 89'; Ashley Lawrence 97'	Report	Michelle Prokof 4'; Allison Ganter 40'	Stadium: Swope Soccer Village; Referee: Lance VanHaitsma

== Awards ==
=== Most valuable player ===
- Offensive MVP – Ashley Lawrence – West Virginia
- Defensive MVP – Kadeisha Buchanan – West Virginia

=== All-Tournament team ===
Position	Player	Team
D	Meghan Murphy	TCU
D	Kadeisha Buchanan	West Virginia
D	Amandine Pierre-Louis	West Virginia
MF	Karitas Tomasdottir	TCU
MF	Ashley Lawrence	West Virginia
F	Amanda Hoglund	Baylor
F	Liz Keester	Oklahoma
F	Allison Ganter	TCU
F	Michelle Prokof	TCU
F	Michaela Abam	West Virginia
F	Sh’Nia Gordon	West Virginia
