= Bianca St-Georges =

Canadian soccer player (born 1997)

- St-Georges with the Boston Legacy in 2026

Personal information
- Full name: Bianca Rose St-Georges
- Date of birth: July 28, 1997 (age 29)
- Place of birth: Saint-Charles-Borromée, Quebec, Canada
- Height: 1.67 m (5 ft 5 1/2 in)
- Positions: Defender; winger

Team information
- Current team: Boston Legacy
- Number: 53

Youth career
- St-Félix De Valois
- AS Laser de Joliette

College career
Years	Team	Apps	(Gls)
2015–2018	West Virginia Mountaineers	81	(9)

Senior career*
Years	Team	Apps	(Gls)
2019–2023	Chicago Red Stars	44	(6)
2024	North Carolina Courage	21	(3)
2025	Utah Royals	22	(3)
2026–	Boston Legacy	26	(2)

International career^{‡}
2013–2014	Canada U17	8	(0)
2015–2016	Canada U20	7	(0)
2021–	Canada	15	(0)
- * Club domestic league appearances and goals as of 02:18, November 8, 2026 (UTC) ‡ National team caps and goals as of June 3, 2025

Bianca Rose St-Georges (born July 28, 1997) is a Canadian professional soccer player who plays as a defender or winger for Boston Legacy FC of the National Women's Soccer League (NWSL) and the Canadian national team.

St-Georges played college soccer as a right back for the West Virginia Mountaineers and was named the Big 12 Defensive Player of the Year in 2018. She was drafted by the Chicago Red Stars in the third round of the 2019 NWSL College Draft. She has also played for the North Carolina Courage and the Utah Royals.

== Early life ==
St-Georges was born and raised in Saint-Charles-Borromée, Quebec to a Canadian father and an American mother. She began playing soccer at age five with St-Félix De Valois. Afterwards, she played with AS Laser. At age 13, she joined the Canadian REX program in Quebec.

== College career ==
St-Georges attended West Virginia University, where she played for the women's soccer team as a defender. She was the Big 12 Conference Freshman of the Year in 2015. She was the Big 12 Conference Defensive Player of the Year in 2018.

== Club career ==
=== Chicago Red Stars ===
St-Georges was selected in the third round (20th overall) by the Chicago Red Stars in the 2019 NWSL College Draft, being the only Canadian player to be drafted. However, her rookie season was delayed until the following year, as she suffered a meniscus tear in her knee. She made her debut for Chicago Red Stars on June 28, 2020, against the Washington Spirit in the 2020 NWSL Challenge Cup. She scored her first professional goal and assist came in the Challenge Cup Semi-final against Sky Blue FC on July 23, 2020, and helped the Red Stars reach the final, where they ultimately finished second. In 2021, the Red Stars finished as runner-ups in the 2021 NWSL playoffs. On September 25, 2022, she showed both middle fingers to the referee and was handed a red card as the Red Stars lost 3–0 to the Portland Thorns. Beyond the usual one-game penalty for a red card, the NWSL suspended her for an additional game and issued a fine.

=== North Carolina Courage ===
In January 2024, St-Georges signed a two-year contract with the North Carolina Courage. She scored twice in her debut as the Courage won 5–1 over the Houston Dash in the season opener. She made 22 appearances and scored 3 goals before mutually agreeing to end her contract after one season with the Courage in February 2025.

=== Utah Royals ===
St-Georges joined the Utah Royals in March 2025, signing a one-year deal as a free agent. She made a goalscoring debut on a long assist from goalkeeper Mandy McGlynn in the season-opening 1–1 draw against Bay FC. She made 22 appearances and scored 3 goals in the NWSL before departing from the club upon the expiration of her contract.

=== Boston Legacy ===
St-Georges with the Boston Legacy in 2026

On January 2, 2026, NWSL expansion club Boston Legacy FC announced that they had signed St-Georges to a three-year contract through 2028. During her debut for the Legacy in their inaugural game, she was deployed at center back and earned a red card for committing two bookable offenses as the Legacy lost 1–0 to reigning champions Gotham FC.

== International career ==
St-Georges began playing with the Canada U17 team at the 2013 CONCACAF Women's U-17 Championship, helping them to win the silver medal and subsequently at the 2014 FIFA U-17 Women's World Cup.

She also was a part of the Canada U20 team U-20 team that won silver at the 2015 CONCACAF Women's U-20 Championship and played at the 2016 FIFA U-20 Women's World Cup.

She was invited to the Canadian senior team camp for the first time in February 2021. However, during the camp she suffered a meniscus tear in her knee (the opposite knee from her previous injury in 2019). She made her debut for the Canadian senior team on June 11, 2021, in a friendly against the Czech Republic. She was one of the final cuts from the team ahead of the 2020 Olympics (held in 2021), where Canada won gold.

== Honours ==
West Virginia Mountaineers

- Big 12 Conference women's soccer tournament: 2016, 2018

Individual

- Big 12 Conference Defensive Player of the Year: 2018
- Big 12 Conference Freshman of the Year: 2015
