= Rylee Foster =

Canadian soccer player (born 1998)

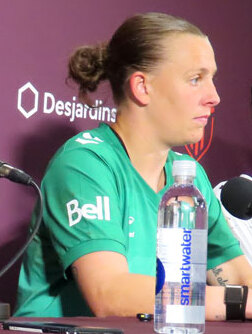
- Foster in 2026

Personal information
- Full name: Rylee Ann Foster-Inman
- Birth name: Rylee Ann Foster
- Date of birth: August 13, 1998 (age 28)
- Place of birth: Kitchener, Ontario, Canada
- Height: 1.78 m (5 ft 10 in)
- Position: Goalkeeper

Team information
- Current team: Everton

Youth career
- Cambridge United

College career
Years	Team	Apps	(Gls)
2016–2019	West Virginia Mountaineers	84	(0)

Senior career*
Years	Team	Apps	(Gls)
2020–2023	Liverpool	5	(0)
2023–2024	Wellington Phoenix	19	(0)
2024–2025	Everton	0	(0)
2025	Durham	9	(0)
2025	Dallas Trinity	12	(0)
2026	Halifax Tides FC	10	(0)
2026–	Everton	0	(0)

International career^{‡}
2013–2014	Canada U17	7	(0)
2014–2018	Canada U20	9	(0)
Medal record
Women's football
Representing Canada
CONCACAF Women's U-20 Championship
Runner-up	2015 Honduras
CONCACAF Women's U-17 Championship
Runner-up	2013 Jamaica
- * Club domestic league appearances and goals as of August 12, 2026 ‡ National team caps and goals as of April 27, 2021

Rylee Ann Foster-Inman (née Foster; born August 13, 1998) is a Canadian soccer player who plays as a goalkeeper for Women's Super League club Everton. She has represented Canada at the under-17 and under-20 levels. In 2021, she was called up to the senior national team.

== Early life ==
Kitchener-born, and raised in Cambridge, Ontario, Foster attended Stewart Avenue Public School, where she first excelled in sports from a young age, then Glenview Park Secondary School where she ran track and earned Junior Track Athlete of the Year honors.

Foster was a Liverpool supporter as a youth. Her grandparents were born in Wavertree, South Liverpool.

== College career ==
Foster attended West Virginia University from 2016–2019 where she played for the West Virginia Mountaineers with fellow Canadian internationals Kadeisha Buchanan and Ashley Lawrence. She made 84 appearances for the Mountaineers and had 39 clean sheets (the second highest record in the school's history)

== Club career ==
Foster signed with Liverpool in January 2020 right before the COVID-19 pandemic. She made her debut in a 3–1 win over Manchester United in October 2020 during the Continental Cup. She made her FA Women's Super League debut in a 1–1 draw with Blackburn Rovers Ladies in March 2021. The same month, she signed a long-term contract with Liverpool in March 2021. She was named Player of the Month for April after keeping two clean sheets, including saving Katie Wilkinson’s and Courtney Sweetman-Kirk’s penalties in a 1–0 away win at Sheffield United.

In September 2023, almost two years after the car crash that halted her career, Foster joined New Zealand A-League Women club Wellington Phoenix to compete for the first-choice goalkeeper spot with Brianna Edwards. In July 2024, she left the club together with Edwards.

In September 2024, Foster would sign a short term contract with WSL club Everton.

In January 2025, Foster signed with Women's Championship side Durham. On 26 June 2025, having kept 3 clean sheets in 10 appearances overall for Durham, it was announced that she was departing the club upon the expiry of her contract.

American club Dallas Trinity FC signed Foster ahead of the 2025–26 USL Super League season. On August 23, 2025, Foster made her Dallas debut in the club's season-opening victory over Spokane Zephyr FC.

In January 2026, Foster joined Northern Super League side Halifax Tides FC.

In August 2026, she returned to Everton.

== International career ==
Foster has represented Canada on the Canada U17 and Canada U20 teams. In 2021, she was called up to the senior national team.

‘In 2013, she earned Golden Glove honors at the 2013 CONCACAF Women's U-17 Championship after helping Canada finish in second place. She competed in two games at the 2014 FIFA U-17 Women's World Cup in Costa Rica where Canada reached the quarterfinals but were eliminated by Venezuela 3–2. In January 2021, she was called up to training camp for the senior national team ahead of the 2021 SheBelieves Cup in the United States. She was one of three goalkeepers called up for the tournament in March 2021.

== Personal life ==
Foster has a tattoo of Liverpool's anthem, "You'll Never Walk Alone," on the inside of her arm which she got after her grandmother died in 2013.

In October 2021, Foster was involved in a serious car crash suffering life-threatening injuries including breaking her neck. In February 2022, after finding out her bones were almost healed, she stated that she was hoping to begin her return to football within a year.

== Honours ==
Individual

- CONCACAF Women's U-17 Championship Golden Glove: 2013
- CONCACAF Women's U-17 Championship Best XI: 2013
- A-League Women Player of the Month: October/November 2023, December 2023
