= Megan Mischler =

American professional soccer player (born 1989)

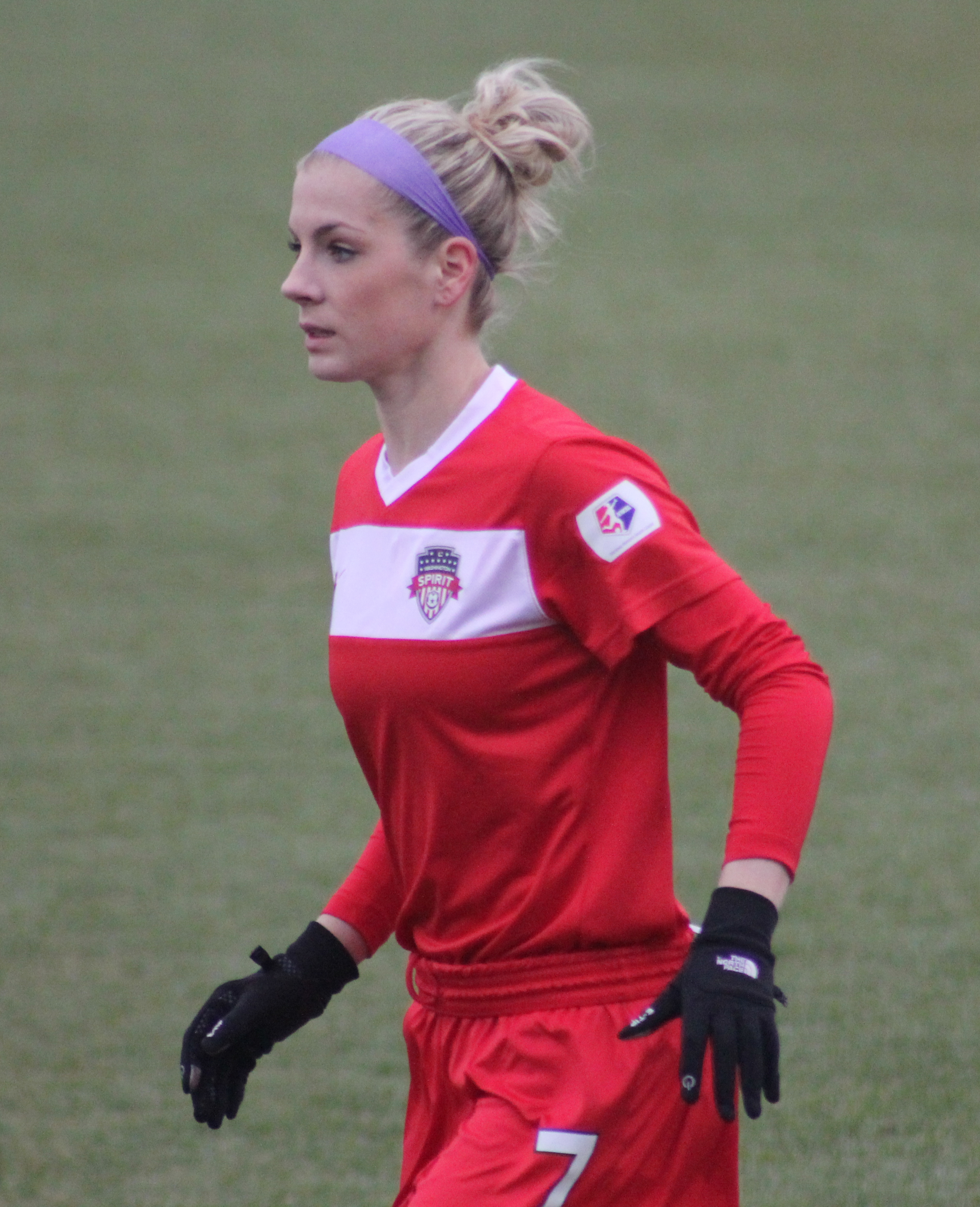

Personal information
- Full name: Megan Kathleen Mischler
- Date of birth: August 8, 1989 (age 37)
- Place of birth: Moon Township, Pennsylvania, U.S.
- Height: 5 ft 5 in (1.65 m)
- Position: Forward

College career
Years	Team	Apps	(Gls)
2007–2010	West Virginia Mountaineers		

Senior career*
Years	Team	Apps	(Gls)
2011	Boston Breakers		
2012	Hammarby		
- * Club domestic league appearances and goals

Megan Kathleen Mischler (born August 8, 1989) is an American professional soccer player who last played for Washington Spirit of the National Women's Soccer League (NWSL). She played for Hammarby
