= Michaela Abam =

Cameroonian footballer

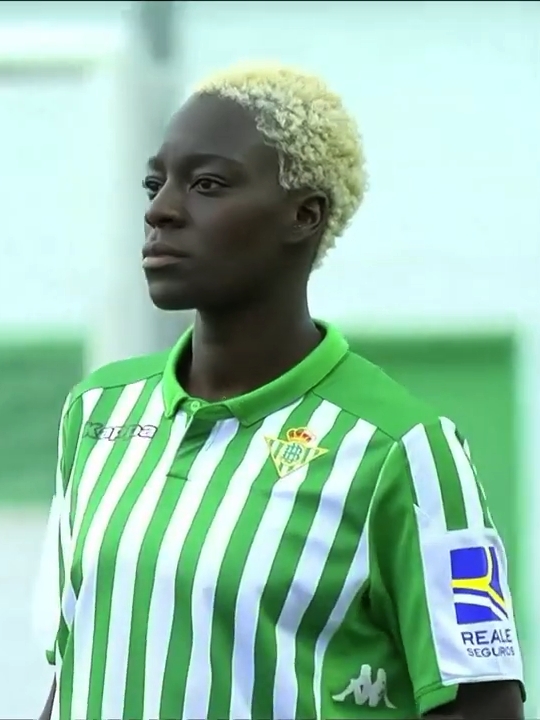
- Abam with Real Betis in 2019

Personal information
- Full name: Michaela-Batya Bisi Abam
- Date of birth: 12 June 1997 (age 29)
- Place of birth: Houston, Texas, United States
- Height: 1.70 m (5 ft 7 in)
- Position: Midfielder

Team information
- Current team: Al-Ula

Youth career
- Texas Rush

College career
Years	Team	Apps	(Gls)
2014–2017	West Virginia Mountaineers	95	(42)

Senior career*
Years	Team	Apps	(Gls)
2018	Sky Blue FC	4	(0)
2018–2019	Paris FC	10	(1)
2019–2020	Real Betis	20	(3)
2021–2022	Houston Dash	19	(1)
2023	Linköping FC	15	(2)
2024–2025	Deportivo Toluca	54	(16)
2026	Cruz Azul	6	(2)
2026–	Al-Ula	0	(0)

International career^{‡}
2013	United States U17		
2018–2023	Cameroon	6	(3)
Medal record
Women's Africa Cup of Nations
Gold medal – first place	2026 Morocco
- * Club domestic league appearances and goals as of 1 February 2026 ‡ National team caps and goals as of 21:30, 17 July 2022 (UTC)

Michaela-Batya Bisi Abam (born 12 June 1997) is a professional footballer who plays as a midfielder for Al-Ula. Born in the United States, she plays for the Cameroon national team. She previously played for Houston Dash and Sky Blue FC in the American National Women's Soccer League, Real Betis in the Spanish Primera División, Paris FC in the Division 1 Féminine, and West Virginia University.

== Early life ==
Abam was born in Houston, Texas. She attended Harmony Science Academy High School and played youth soccer with Texas Rush, which later became part of Houston Dynamo/Dash Youth Academy.

== College career ==
Abam played in a school-record 95 games for the Mountaineers, scoring 42 goals and 16 assists. In 2016, she scored the only goal in a 1–0 win over the University of North Carolina in the College Cup semi-final, leading WVU to their first-ever College Cup final.

== Club career ==
=== Sky Blue FC, 2018 ===
Abam was selected by Sky Blue FC as the 4th overall pick in the 2018 NWSL College Draft. In March she was named to the final roster for the 2018 season. After appearing in four games for Sky Blue, she was waived by the team on July 25.

=== Paris FC, 2018–2019 ===
On 1 August 2018, Abam signed a one-year contract to play for Paris FC in France's Division 1 Féminine. She appeared in 10 league matches and scored one goal.

=== Real Betis, 2019–2020 ===
On 7 August 2019, Abam signed a one-year contract to play for Spanish Primera División team Real Betis. She appeared in 15 league matches, scoring three goals, before competition was suspended due to the COVID-19 pandemic. On 24 September 2020, she scored a hat-trick against Hispalis in the pre-season Andalusian Women's Cup quarterfinals. She appeared in five more league matches for Real Betis before leaving the club.

=== Houston Dash, 2021–2022 ===
In August 2021, Abam signed for the Houston Dash in the NWSL, becoming the first player signed by the Dash who attended a Dash-affiliated youth club. Her first appearance was on 13 August 2021 against the Washington Spirit, where she scored the equalizing goal in a 2–2 draw.

On 20 March 2023, the Dash announced that the club had waived Abam.

=== Linköping FC, 2023–2026 ===
On 4 April 2023, Damallsvenskan club Linköping FC announced that it had signed Abam.

== International career ==
Abam made her senior debut for Cameroon on 12 November 2018 in a 7–0 friendly win against Zambia, scoring twice. Then, she was called up to compete at the 2018 Africa Women Cup of Nations, but did not make any appearance by problems with her Cameroonian passport. In May 2019, she was named for the 2019 FIFA Women's World Cup.

== Career statistics ==
=== International goals ===
Scores and results list Cameroon's goal tally first

No.	Date	Venue	Opponent	Score	Result	Competition
1	12 November 2018	Stade Municipal (Bingerville), Abidjan, Ivory Coast	Zambia	5–0	7–0	Friendly
2	12 November 2018	Stade Municipal (Bingerville), Abidjan, Ivory Coast	Zambia	7–0	7–0	Friendly

== Honours ==
West Virginia Mountaineers

- Big 12 Conference women's soccer tournament: 2014, 2016

Individual

- Big 12 Conference Offensive Player of the Year: 2016
