= Jenna Richmond =

American soccer midfielder (born 1991)

Personal information
- Full name: Jenna Carroll Richmond
- Date of birth: December 18, 1991 (age 34)
- Place of birth: Alexandria, Virginia
- Height: 5 ft 9 in (1.75 m)
- Position: Midfielder

College career
Years	Team	Apps	(Gls)
2010–2013	UCLA Bruins		

Senior career*
Years	Team	Apps	(Gls)
2013	Pali Blues	2	(0)
2014	FC Kansas City	22	(1)

International career^{‡}
2008	United States U-17		
2010	United States U-20	15	(1)
2013	United States U-23	8	(1)
- * Club domestic league appearances and goals as of October 25, 2014 ‡ National team caps and goals as of October 25, 2014

Jenna Carroll Richmond (born December 18, 1991) is an American soccer midfielder who last played for FC Kansas City in the National Women's Soccer League.

== Early life ==
Born in Alexandria, Virginia, Richmond attended Centreville High School in Clifton, Virginia where she played soccer and ran cross country, where she won districts as a freshman. Playing for two club soccer teams, GSC Team America Premier and McLean Freedom, she won six State Cup titles and won a national championship at the U-16 level. She received Golden Boot honors at the national championship as the tournament's top goal scorer.

In 2009 and 2010, Richmond was named Gatorade Player of the Year for Virginia as well as Parade All-American. In 2010, she was also named Washington Post Player of the Year. During her senior year in high school, she was named the top college recruit according to multiple sources, including ESPN and Top Drawer Soccer.

=== UCLA Bruins ===
Won the 2013 NCAA Division I Women's Soccer Championship with UCLA in her senior year.

== Playing career ==
=== Club ===
==== FC Kansas City ====
Richmond was drafted by FC Kansas City as the sixteenth overall pick of the 2014 NWSL College Draft.

=== International ===
Richmond has represented the United States on the U-15, U-17, U-20, and U-23 teams.

== Honors and awards ==
=== Team ===
with FC Kansas City:

- NWSL championship: 2014
