= Grace Cutler =

American soccer player

Personal information
- Full name: Grace Erin Cutler
- Date of birth: February 18, 1997 (age 29)
- Place of birth: Fort Collins, Colorado
- Height: 5 ft 9 in (1.75 m)
- Position: Forward

Team information
- Current team: Fort Lauderdale United
- Number: 7

College career
Years	Team	Apps	(Gls)
2015	Santa Clara Broncos	22	(6)
2016–2018	West Virginia Mountaineers	73	(6)

Senior career*
Years	Team	Apps	(Gls)
2019	Washington Spirit	0	(0)
2019–2020	Sassuolo	13	(0)
2021–2025	Omiya Ardija Ventus	2	(1)
2025	ŽNK Međimurje Čakovec	10	(7)
2026–	Fort Lauderdale United	0	(0)
- * Club domestic league appearances and goals as of 23:18, July 14, 2026 (UTC) ‡ National team caps and goals as of October 4, 2021

Grace Erin Cutler (born February 18, 1997) is an American professional soccer player who plays as a forward for USL Super League club Fort Lauderdale United FC.

== College career ==
Cutler grew up in Fort Collins, Colorado. She spent her freshman year of college at Santa Clara University, scoring six goals and making 22 appearances for the Broncos.

In 2016, Cutler transferred to West Virginia University. She was called upon to participate in all 72 of the Mountaineers' matches over the next three seasons. As a senior in 2018, she captained West Virginia and was named to the All-Big 12 second team.

== Club career ==
The Houston Dash drafted Cutler with the 22nd pick in the 2019 NWSL College Draft. She signed with Washington Spirit and the Dash in 2019 but did not appear in a game.

After her experiences in the NWSL, Cutler signed for Italian club Sassuolo, where she started and played the entirety of all matches she appeared in.

Cutler made her WE League debut for Omiya Ardija Ventus on September 26, 2021. She became the first non-Japanese player to score in league history on October 2, 2021.

In January 2025, Cutler signed for Croatian 1. HNLŽ club ŽNK Međimurje Čakovec. She scored 7 goals across 10 appearances in her sole season with the team.

On July 14, 2026, Cutler was announced to have signed for USL Super League club Fort Lauderdale United FC. The move reunited her with former West Virginia teammate Sh'Nia Gordon.
