= Frances Silva =

Venezuelan-American retired soccer forward and midfielder

Personal information
- Full name: Frances Andrea Silva León
- Date of birth: November 2, 1992 (age 34)
- Place of birth: Caracas, Venezuela
- Height: 1.63 m (5 ft 4 in)
- Position: Midfielder

College career
Years	Team	Apps	(Gls)
2010–2013	West Virginia Mountaineers	89	(38)

Senior career*
Years	Team	Apps	(Gls)
2014–2016	FC Kansas City	52	(4)

International career
2014	United States U23		
- * Club domestic league appearances and goals

Frances Andrea Silva León (born November 2, 1992) is a Venezuelan-American retired soccer forward and midfielder who played for FC Kansas City.

== Early life ==
Frances attended Blue Valley North High School in Overland Park, KS.

== College career ==
In her college years, she played for West Virginia Mountaineers women's soccer team. In her four years with the Mountaineers, Silva helped WVU claim four conference championships. During her senior season, Silva finished with 15 goals, 13 assists and 43 points. Silva was Second Team NSCAA All-America in 2013 and First Team NSCAA Scholar All-America in 2013.

== Club career ==
She was drafted by FC Kansas City in the 2014 NWSL College Draft. She was the 19th overall pick. She scored her first goal for FC Kansas City on May 3, 2014, in a 4–0 win against Houston Dash. On June 14, 2014, Silva scored her second-career goal, a game-winner in the third minute of stoppage time, also against the Dash.

Silva had an impressive sophomore campaign with the Blues, appearing in 15 of the squad's 20 matches. She led the entire NWSL in assists per minute played (minimum three assists recorded), averaging an assist every 145.6 minutes of action. Megan Rapinoe's mark of an assist every 164.8 minutes played was good for second in the league. In the end, Silva and the Blues recorded their second straight NWSL Title, defeating the Seattle Reign, 2–1, at Providence Park in Portland, Oregon, on October 1, 2015.

Silva announced her retirement from professional soccer on November 16, 2016, ending her time with FC Kansas City.

== International career ==
Silva played for the United States U-23 National Team at the Six Nations Tournament in La Manga, Spain, in the winter of 2014. She started and scored her first international goal in a 2–0 win over Sweden on March 4, 2014. She ultimately helped guide the USA squad to three wins and a Six Nations Tournament title

== Personal life ==
She was born in Venezuela and is fluent in both English and Spanish. She studied in West Virginia University, television journalism with a minor in sports communication. Silva received her master's degree in sport management from West Virginia University in the summer of 2014.

== Career statistics ==
Appearances and goals by club, season and competition
Club	Season	League			Playoffs (Note: Includes NWSL playoffs)		Total	
Club	Season	Division	Apps	Goals	Apps	Goals	Apps	Goals
FC Kansas City	2014	NWSL	18	2	0	0	18	2
FC Kansas City	2015	NWSL	15	0	1	0	16	0
FC Kansas City	2016	NWSL	19	2	—		19	2
Career total			52	4	1	0	53	4

== Honours ==
West Virginia Mountaineers

- Big 12 Conference women's soccer tournament: 2013

FC Kansas City

- NWSL championship: 2014, 2015

Individual

- Big 12 Conference Offensive Player of the Year: 2013
- Big 12 Conference women's soccer tournament Offensive MVP: 2013
