= 2014 Big 12 Conference women's soccer tournament =

- Classification: Division I
- Teams: 8
- Matches: 7
- Attendance: 2,451
- Site: Swope Soccer Village; Kansas City, Missouri
- Champions: West Virginia (2nd title)
- Winning coach: Nikki Izzo-Brown (2nd title)
- Broadcast: Fox Sports 1 (Final only)

2014 Big 12 Conference women's soccer standings
	Conf.						Overall
Team	W		L		T	PCT	W		L		T	PCT
No. 15 West Virginia ‍†‍‡‍^{y}	7	–	0	–	1	.938	16	–	2	–	4	.818
Oklahoma State ‍‍‍^{y}	5	–	2	–	1	.688	10	–	10	–	1	.500
No. 23 Kansas ‍‍‍^{y}	5	–	3	–	0	.625	15	–	6	–	0	.714
No. 14 Texas Tech ‍‍‍^{y}	4	–	3	–	1	.563	16	–	4	–	2	.773
Texas ‍‍‍^{y}	4	–	4	–	0	.500	11	–	8	–	4	.565
Oklahoma ‍‍‍^{y}	3	–	4	–	1	.438	10	–	9	–	4	.522
Baylor ‍‍‍	2	–	5	–	1	.313	9	–	8	–	3	.525
TCU ‍‍‍	1	–	4	–	3	.313	8	–	8	–	3	.500
Iowa State ‍‍‍	1	–	7	–	0	.125	7	–	11	–	0	.389
† – Conference champion ‡ – Tournament champion y – Invited to the NCAA tournament Rankings from NSCAA Coaches

The 2014 Big 12 Conference women's soccer tournament was the postseason women's soccer tournament for the Big 12 Conference held on November 5, 7 and 9, 2014. The seven-match tournament was held at the Swope Soccer Village in Kansas City, Missouri with a combined attendance of 2,451. The 8-team single-elimination tournament consisted of three rounds based on seeding from regular season conference play. The West Virginia Mountaineers defeated the Oklahoma Sooners in the championship match to win their second conference tournament since joining the league.

== Regular season standings ==
Place	Seed	Team	Conference					Overall			
Place	Seed	Team	W	L	T	%	Pts	W	L	T	%
1	1	West Virginia	7	0	1	.938	22	16	2	4	.818
2	2	Oklahoma State	5	2	1	.688	16	10	10	1	.500
3	3	Kansas	5	3	0	.625	15	15	6	0	.714
4	4	Texas Tech	4	3	1	.563	13	16	4	2	.773
5	5	Texas	4	4	0	.500	12	11	8	4	.565
6	6	Oklahoma	3	4	1	.438	10	10	9	4	.522
7	7	Baylor	2	5	1	.313	7	9	8	3	.525
8	8	TCU	1	4	3	.313	6	8	8	3	.500
9		Iowa State	1	7	0	.125	3	7	11	0	.389

== Bracket ==
Quarterfinals; Wednesday, Nov 5
1	West Virginia	2
8	TCU	1
4	Texas Tech	1 (5)
5	Texas	1 (6)
2	Oklahoma State	0
7	Baylor	1
3	Kansas	1
6	Oklahoma	2

Semifinals; Friday, Nov 7
1	West Virginia	0 (6)
5	Texas	0 (5)
7	Baylor	0 (2)
6	Oklahoma	0 (3)

Final; Sunday, Nov 9
1	West Virginia	1
6	Oklahoma	0

== Awards ==
=== Most valuable player ===
- Offensive MVP – Ashley Lawrence – West Virginia
- Defensive MVP – Kadeisha Buchanan – West Virginia

=== All-Tournament team ===
Position	Player	Team
GK	Hannah Steadman	West Virginia
D	Kadeisha Buchanan	West Virginia
D	Madeline Brem	Oklahoma
D	Laura Rayfield	Oklahoma
MF	Liana Salazar	Kansas
MF	Chantale Campbell	Texas
MF	Ashley Lawrence	West Virginia
MF	Abby Hodgen	Oklahoma
F	Michaela Abam	West Virginia
F	Kate Schwindel	West Virginia
F	Devin Barrett	Oklahoma
