= Katie Barnes =

Retired American soccer player

Personal information
- Date of birth: August 29, 1980 (age 46)
- Place of birth: Mason, Ohio
- Position: Midfielder

College career
Years	Team	Apps	(Gls)
1998–2001	West Virginia Mountaineers		(45)

Senior career*
Years	Team	Apps	(Gls)
2002	Carolina Courage	15	(0)
2003	San Jose CyberRays	18	(2)

International career
2001	United States U21		
- * Club domestic league appearances and goals

Katie Barnes (born August 29, 1980 in Mason, Ohio) is a retired American soccer player who played for the San Jose CyberRays.

== Early life and education ==
Barnes was born in Mason, Ohio on August 29, 1980 and attended Mason High School, graduating in 1998. In 2002, Barnes earned a bachelor's degree in communication studies from West Virginia University.

== Career ==
=== Athletics ===
While studying at West Virginia University from 1998–2001, Barnes played for the university's women's soccer team, starting in every game during her tenure.

In 2000, the team played in the National Collegiate Athletic Association (NCAA) tournament for the first time. At the end of the season, Barnes beat records for goals scored (17), assists (9), and total points (43). Her senior year, Barnes received various accolades, including being selected for the First Team All-Big East Conference, NSCAA/adidas Mid-Atlantic Region first team, and Soccer Buzz First Team Mid-Atlantic Region member. She received All-American honors from NSCAA/adidas and National Strength and Conditioning, and was also honored with the Fred Schaus Captain's Award for demonstrating her pivotal role on the team both on and off the field. Upon graduation in 2002, she held or shared 17 university records.

Barnes was also a member of the United States women's national under-21 soccer team, where she helped win three Nordic Cups.

In 2002, Barnes was selected in the second round of the Women's United Soccer Association (WUSA) draft to play for the Carolina Courage. That year, the Courage won the 2002 WUSA Founders Cup. The following year, Barnes transferred to play for the San Jose CyberRays, and was nominated to play in the WUSA All-Star Game. WUSA folded after the 2003 season.

Barnes also played in the United Soccer League for the Cincinnati Ladyhawks.

=== Coaching ===
In 2004, Barnes joined the University of Alabama as an assistant coach, a position she held four seasons.

=== Law enforcement ===
After coaching at the University of Alabama, Barnes moved back to Mason, Ohio to begin a career in law enforcement, starting with a position as a corrections officer. As of 2012, she was a deputy sheriff with the Warren County Sheriff’s Office. In 2016, she received a potentially fatal gunshot wound, though she survived the attack.

== Honors ==
In 2012, Barnes was inducted into the West Virginia University Sports Hall of Fame.
