= West Virginia Mountaineers women's soccer =

American college women's soccer team

- Founded: 1995; 31 years ago
- University: West Virginia University
- Head coach: Nikki Izzo-Brown (31st season)
- Conference: Big 12
- Location: Morgantown, West Virginia, US
- Stadium: Dick Dlesk Soccer Stadium (capacity: 1,650)
- Nickname: Mountaineers
- Colors: Gold and blue
Home	Away

NCAA tournament runner-up
- 2016

NCAA tournament College Cup
- 2016

NCAA tournament Quarterfinals
- 2007, 2015, 2016

NCAA tournament Round of 16
- 2003, 2007, 2010, 2015, 2016, 2017, 2019

NCAA tournament Round of 32
- 2002, 2003, 2004, 2005, 2007, 2008, 2009, 2010, 2013, 2015, 2016, 2017, 2018, 2019, 2022, 2025

NCAA tournament appearances
- 2000, 2001, 2002, 2003, 2004, 2005, 2006, 2007, 2008, 2009, 2010, 2011, 2012, 2013, 2014, 2015, 2016, 2017, 2018, 2019, 2020, 2022, 2024, 2025, 2026

Conference tournament championships
- Big East: 2007, 2010, 2011; Big 12: 2013, 2014, 2016, 2018, 2022

Conference regular season championships
- Big 12: 2012, 2013, 2014, 2015, 2016, 2017

The West Virginia Mountaineers women's soccer are the intercollegiate women's soccer team representing West Virginia University. The Mountaineers compete in Division I of the National Collegiate Athletic Association (NCAA) as members of the Big 12 Conference. The first team was fielded in 1996. WVU plays its home games at Dick Dlesk Soccer Stadium in Morgantown, West Virginia.

The women's soccer team at WVU has been coached by Nikki Izzo-Brown since the team launched in 1996.

West Virginia has qualified for the NCAA Tournament each of the last 16 seasons, making the quarterfinal round twice (2007 and 2015).

== Big 12 Conference (2012–present) ==
Since joining the Big 12 Conference, West Virginia women's soccer has won five straight outright regular-season championships, becoming the first program in league history to do so. The Mountaineers are also the first team in the Big 12 to finish three seasons with an unbeaten league record. In 2016, the Mountaineers became the second program in Big 12 history to finish league play with an unbeaten and untied league record (Nebraska accomplished that feat twice, finishing 9–0–0 in 1996 and 10–0–0 in 1999).

WVU has posted a 35–1–3 record in regular-season league contests. The Mountaineers are 18–0–1 at home against Big 12 foes and have not lost a league game there since October 2, 2009 vs. Notre Dame. West Virginia has a 6–2–1 record in the Big 12 tournament, winning back-to-back championships in 2013 and 2014.

The Mountaineers' five regular-season league titles ranks first among current Big 12 members and second all-time in the conference's history (Texas A&M had 7). West Virginia's eight combined (regular-season and tournament) championships is also first among current Big 12 members and tied for second best in Big 12 history (Texas A&M had 12 and Nebraska had 8).

=== 2015 season ===
2015 was a record-setting year for West Virginia women's soccer. Aided by Canadian national team stars Kadeisha Buchanan and Ashley Lawrence, the Mountaineers set school records for wins (19), goals scored (61), fewest goals allowed (11) and shutouts (15). WVU put together a streak of nine consecutive shutouts, the longest streak in the nation in 2015. That run also tied the Big 12 record for consecutive shutouts (Nebraska posted nine straight shutouts during the 1997 season).

WVU started the 2015 season by extending its program-best unbeaten streak to 20 games. The Mountaineers would restart that run following an early season loss to Virginia Tech, winning or drawing each of the next 16 games.

=== 2016 season ===
In 2016, the Mountaineers continued to run through the competition. West Virginia posted an 8–1–1 record in non-conference play, opening the year with a 1–1 tie at defending national champion Penn State. The non-conference slate also included a 3–1 road win at Duke, the program's first victory over the Blue Devils.

WVU's hot start continued into league play, where the Mountaineers won all eight of their conference matchups via shutouts, becoming the first team in Big 12 history to shutout all of its league opponents. West Virginia claimed its fifth straight Big 12 championship with a 3–0 win at TCU on October 21, 2016. WVU currently owns a 22-game unbeaten streak in regular-season league games, the longest streak in the history of the conference.

== Season-by-season results ==
Record table
Season	Coach	Overall	Conference	Standing	Postseason
Big East Conference (1996–2011)
1996	Nikki Izzo	10–7–2	4–4–1	5th	
1997	Nikki Izzo	11–6–2	4–6–1	5th	
1998	Nikki Izzo	11–6–2	4–5–2	7th	
1999	Nikki Izzo	9–9–1	2–4–0	5th	
2000	Nikki Izzo-Brown	15–6–0	3–3–0	4th	NCAA Round of 64
2001	Nikki Izzo-Brown	15–5–1	4–1–1	2nd	NCAA Round of 64
2002	Nikki Izzo-Brown	18–3–1	5–0–1	1st	NCAA Round of 32
2003	Nikki Izzo-Brown	17–4–2	4–1–1	2nd	NCAA Round of 16
2004	Nikki Izzo-Brown	15–6–0	7–3–0	3rd	NCAA Round of 32
2005	Nikki Izzo-Brown	12–6–3	7–2–1	3rd	NCAA Round of 32
2006	Nikki Izzo-Brown	14–4–3	8–1–2	1st	NCAA Round of 64
2007	Nikki Izzo-Brown	18–5–2	9–1–1	1st	Big East Tournament Champions; NCAA Quarterfinal
2008	Nikki Izzo-Brown	14–3–6	7–1–3	1st	NCAA Round of 32
2009	Nikki Izzo-Brown	10–7–6	5–3–3	3rd	NCAA Round of 32
2010	Nikki Izzo-Brown	18–5–1	9–1–1	2nd	Big East Tournament Champions; NCAA Round of 16
2011	Nikki Izzo-Brown	17–4–0	10–1–0	1st	Big East Tournament Champions; NCAA Round of 64
Big 12 Conference (2012–present)
2012	Nikki Izzo-Brown	11–5–4	7–0–1	1st	NCAA Round of 64
2013	Nikki Izzo-Brown	16–3–4	7–1–0	1st	Big 12 Tournament Champions; NCAA Round of 32
2014	Nikki Izzo-Brown	16–2–4	7–0–1	1st	Big 12 Tournament Champions; NCAA Round of 64
2015	Nikki Izzo-Brown	19–3–1	6–0–1	1st	NCAA Quarterfinal
2016	Nikki Izzo-Brown	23–2–2	8–0–0	1st	Big 12 Tournament Champions; NCAA Runner-up
2017	Nikki Izzo-Brown	16–4–3	7–1–1	2nd	NCAA Round of 32
2018	Nikki Izzo-Brown	15–4–4	7–2–0	2nd	NCAA Round of 32
2019	Nikki Izzo-Brown	12–8–2	5–3–1	4th	NCAA Round of 16
2020	Nikki Izzo-Brown	10–3–1	7–2–0	2nd	NCAA Round of 32
2021	Nikki Izzo-Brown	10–5–5	3–3–3	6th	
2022	Nikki Izzo-Brown	11–5–7	4–1–4	4th	Big 12 Tournament Champions; NCAA Round of 32
2023	Nikki Izzo-Brown	7–8–4	5–3–2	5th	
2024	Nikki Izzo-Brown	12–5–3	8–2–1	3rd	NCAA Round of 64
2025	Nikki Izzo-Brown	14–3–4	8–0–3	2nd	NCAA Round of 32
Nikki Izzo-Brown:		416–146–80			
Total:		416–146–80			
National champion Postseason invitational champion Conference regular season champion Conference regular season and conference tournament champion Division regular season champion Division regular season and conference tournament champion Conference tournament champion

== Current roster ==
As of August 2026

Note: Flags indicate national team as defined under FIFA eligibility rules; some limited exceptions apply. Players may hold more than one non-FIFA nationality.

No.	Pos.	Nation	Player
0	GK	USA	Madison Foulke
1	GK	USA	Bailey Herfurth
2	FW	USA	Ezra Wright
3	DF	USA	Jacey Rase
4	FW	USA	Saige Wimes
5	FW	USA	Rylee Felton
6	MF	USA	Maya Leoni
7	MF	USA	Alexis Pashales
8	MF	GER	Alina Gnädig
9	FW	USA	Abbey Olexa
10	MF	USA	Maddie Levy
11	FW	USA	Jordyn Wilson
12	DF	USA	Olivia Shertzer
13	MF	CAN	Anna Hauer
14	FW	USA	Maria Delyannis

No.	Pos.	Nation	Player
15	MF	USA	Hannah Heimuli
18	FW	USA	Kailyn Effah
19	MF	USA	Ava Arnold
21	FW	USA	Alexis Ré
22	MF	USA	Layla Thompson
23	DF	CAN	Christina Salama
24	DF	CAN	Nyema Ingleton
26	FW/DF	USA	Sophia Nickel
27	DF	USA	Isabel Ceaser
29	DF	USA	Josie Johnson
35	DF	USA	Mia Paugh
37	DF	USA	Gianna Koss
39	DF	USA	Parker Dieck
45	DF	USA	Tyler Clyburn
61	GK	USA	Campbell Wolff

== Individual Awards ==
All-Americans
No.	Player	Year
5	Taylor White	2025 United Soccer Coaches (3rd team)
10	Jordan Brewster	2020 United Soccer Coaches (2nd team), 2021 United Soccer Coaches (3rd team), 2022 United Soccer Coaches (3rd team)
25	Rylee Foster	2018 United Soccer Coaches (3rd team)
4	Bianca St. Georges	2018 Senior CLASS (1st team), 2018 United Soccer Coaches (2nd team)
11	Amandine Pierre-Louis	2017 United Soccer Coaches (2nd team)
5	Michaela Abam	2016 NSCAA (2nd team), 2017 Senior CLASS (2nd team), 2017 United Soccer Coaches (2nd team)
27	Amanda Hill	2015 Senior CLASS (2nd team)
9	Ashley Lawrence	2015 NSCAA (1st team), 2016 NSCAA (1st team), 2016 Senior CLASS (2nd team)
99	Kate Schwindel	2014 Senior CLASS (2nd team)
88	Kadeisha Buchanan	2013 NSCAA (2nd team), 2014 NSCAA (1st team), 2015 NSCAA (1st team), 2016 NSCAA (1st team), 2016 Senior CLASS (1st team)
9	Frances Silva	2013 NSCAA (2nd team)
33	Bry McCarthy	2012 NSCAA (3rd team)
31	Carolyn Blank	2008 Soccer Buzz (2nd team), 2008 NSCAA (2nd team), 2009 NSCAA (2nd team)
10	Amanda Cicchini	2007 Soccer Buzz (3rd team), 2007 NSCAA (2nd team)
4	Greer Barnes	2007 Soccer Buzz (2nd team), 2007 NSCAA (2nd team), 2008 Soccer Buzz (2nd team), 2008 NSCAA (3rd team)
6	Ashley Banks	2007 Soccer Buzz (2nd team), 2007 NSCAA (3rd team)
15	Deana Everrett	2006 Soccer Buzz (3rd team)
57	Laura Kane	2004 NSCAA (3rd team)
7	Lisa Stoia	2002 Soccer Buzz (2nd team), 2002 NSCAA (2nd team), 2003 Soccer Buzz (1st team), 2003 NSCAA (1st team)
5	Chrissie Abbott	2002 Soccer Buzz (1st team), 2002 NSCAA (1st team), 2003 Soccer Buzz (2nd team), 2003 NSCAA (2nd team)
4	Katie Barnes	2000 Soccer Buzz (3rd team), 2001 Soccer Buzz (2nd team), 2001 NSCAA (1st team)

Player	Award	Season
Stacey Adams	Big East Female Scholar Athlete of the Year	1998
Stacey Sollmann	Big East Female Scholar Athlete of the Year	1999
Katie Barnes	Big East Offensive Player of the Year	2000
Lisa Stoia	Big East Rookie of the Year	2000
Katie Barnes	Big East Offensive Player of the Year	2001
Nikki Izzo-Brown	Big East Coach of the Year	2001
Chrissie Abbott	Big East Offensive Player of the Year	2002
Melissa Haire	Big East Female Scholar Athlete of the Year	2002
Nikki Izzo-Brown	Big East Coach of the Year	2002
Lisa Stoia	Big East Midfielder of the Year	2002
Lisa Stoia	Big East Midfielder of the Year	2003
Ashley Banks	Big East Rookie of the Year	2004
Ashley Weirner	Big East Female Scholar Athlete of the Year	2004
Ashley Banks	Big East Offensive Player of the Year	2007
Kiley Harris	Big East Female Scholar Athlete of the Year	2007
Carolyn Blank	Big East Midfielder of the Year	2008
Kate Schwindel	Big East Rookie of the Year	2011

Player	Award	Season
Nikki Izzo-Brown	Big 12 Coach of the Year	2012
Bry McCarthy	Big 12 Defensive Player of the Year	2012
Kadeisha Buchanan	Big 12 Defensive Player of the Year	2013
Kadeisha Buchanan	Big 12 Newcomer of the Year	2013
Nikki Izzo-Brown	Big 12 Coach of the Year	2013
Frances Silva	Big 12 Offensive Player of the Year	2013
Frances Silva	Big 12 Scholar Athlete of the Year	2013
Michaela Abam	Big 12 Newcomer of the Year	2014
Kadeisha Buchanan	Big 12 Defensive Player of the Year	2014
Nikki Izzo-Brown	Big 12 Coach of the Year	2014
Kadeisha Buchanan	Big 12 Defensive Player of the Year	2015
Nikki Izzo-Brown	Big 12 Coach of the Year	2015
Bianca St. Georges	Big 12 Newcomer of the Year	2015
Michaela Abam	Big 12 Offensive Player of the Year	2016
Kadeisha Buchanan	M.A.C. Hermann Trophy Winner	2016
Kadeisha Buchanan	Big 12 Defensive Player of the Year	2016
Nikki Izzo-Brown	Big 12 Coach of the Year	2016
Amandine Pierre-Louis	Big 12 Defensive Player of the Year	2017
Bianca St. Georges	Big 12 Defensive Player of the Year	2018
Jordan Brewster	Big 12 Defensive Player of the Year	2020
Jordan Brewster	Big 12 Scholar Athlete of the Year	2022
Kayza Massey	Big 12 Goalkeeper of the Year	2022

=== All-Big East Honors ===
Player	First team All-Big East
Chrissie Abbott	2000
Katie Barnes	2000
Katie Barnes	2001
Lisa Stoia	2001
Lisa Stoia	2002
Chrissie Abbott	2003
Laura Kane	2003
Lisa Stoia	2003
Laura Kane	2004
Marisa Kanela	2005
Amanda Cicchini	2006
Deana Everrett	2006
Ashley Banks	2007
Greer Barnes	2007
Amanda Cicchini	2007
Greer Barnes	2008
Carolyn Blank	2008
Amanda Cicchini	2008
Carolyn Blank	2009
Bri Rodriguez	2010
Blake Miller	2011

Player	Second team All-Big East
Stacey Sollmann	1997
Katie Barnes	1999
Rachel Kruze	2000
Lisa Stoia	2000
Chrissie Abbott	2001
Laura Kane	2002
Rachel Kruze	2002
Ashley Banks	2004
Marisa Kanela	2004
Ashley Weirner	2004
Ashley Banks	2005
Amanda Cicchini	2005
Lana Bannerman	2006
Greer Barnes	2006
Carolyn Blank	2007
Deana Everrett	2008
Kerri Butler	2010
Blake Miller	2010
Megan Mischler	2010
Sara Keane	2011
Bry McCarthy	2011
Kate Schwindel	2011
Frances Silva	2011

Player	Third team All-Big East
Lana Bannerman	2005
Kambria Riggins	2005
Kim Bonilla	2006
Deana Everrett	2007
Megan Mischler	2008
Nicole Mailloux	2009
Megan Mischler	2009
Bry McCarthy	2010

=== All-Big 12 Honors ===
Player	First team All-Big 12
Bry McCarthy	2012
Bri Rodriguez	2012
Kate Schwindel	2012
Kadeisha Buchanan	2013
Ashley Lawrence	2013
Kate Schwindel	2013
Frances Silva	2013
Kadeisha Buchanan	2014
Ashley Lawrence	2014
Kate Schwindel	2014
Michaela Abam	2015
Maggie Bedillion	2015
Kadeisha Buchanan	2015
Ashley Lawrence	2015
Kailey Utley	2015
Michaela Abam	2016
Kadeisha Buchanan	2016
Ashley Lawrence	2016
Amandine Pierre-Louis	2016
Carla Portillo	2016
Michaela Abam	2017
Amandine Pierre-Louis	2017
Bianca St. Georges	2017
Rylee Foster	2018
Sh'Nia Gordon	2018
Easther Mayi Kith	2018
Bianca St. Georges	2018
Jordan Brewster	2020
Stefany Ferrer-vanGinkel	2020
Alina Stahl	2020
Jordan Brewster	2021
Jordan Brewster	2022
Kayza Massey	2022
Annika Leslie	2024
Lilly McCarthy	2024
Taylor White	2025

Player	Second team All-Big 12
Frances Silva	2012
Amanda Hill	2013
Cari Price	2014
Kailey Utley	2014
Amanda Hill	2015
Carla Portillo	2015
Bianca St. Georges	2015
Hannah Steadman	2015
Rylee Foster	2016
Vanessa Flores	2017
Rylee Foster	2017
Easther Mayi Kith	2017
Carla Portillo	2017
Jordan Brewster	2018
Grace Cutler	2018
Vanessa Flores	2018
Jordan Brewster	2019
Rylee Foster	2019
Nicole Payne	2020
Lauren Segalla	2020
Kayza Massey	2021
Nicole Payne	2021
Dilary Heredia-Beltran	2022
Gabrielle Robinson	2022
AJ Rodriguez	2022
AJ Rodriguez	2024
Taylor White	2024
Anna Hauer	2025
Nyema Ingleton	2025
Maddie Levy	2025

Note

- ‡ indicates player was Big East Player of the Year
- † indicates player was Big East Rookie of the Year

All-Big East Rookie Honors

Player	Big East All-Rookie Team
Stacey Sollmann	1996
Vanessa Heppeler	1997
Rachel Kruze	1999
Chrissie Abbott	2000
Lisa Stoia †	2000
Laura Kane	2001
Marisa Kanela	2002
Kambria Riggins	2002
Nicole Cauzillo	2003
Bri Rodriguez	2009
Caroline Szwed	2009
Frances Silva	2010
Sara Keane	2011
Kate Schwindel †	2011

Note

- ‡ indicates player was Big 12 Newcomer of the Year
- † indicates player was Big 12 Freshman of the Year

All-Big 12 All-Newcomer/Freshman Honors

Player	Big 12 All-Newcomer/Freshman Team
Kara Blosser	2012
Leah Emaus	2012
Kelsie Maloney	2012
Carly Black	2013
Kadeisha Buchanan ‡	2013
Ashley Lawrence	2013
Michaela Abam ‡	2014
Amandine Pierre-Louis	2014
Carla Portillo	2014
Hannah Steadman	2014
Sh'Nia Gordon	2015
Bianca St. Georges ‡	2015
Rylee Foster	2016
Lauren Segalla	2017
Jordan Brewster	2018
Addison Clark	2018
Enzi Broussard	2019
Nicole Payne	2019
Lilly McCarthy	2020
Dilary Heredia-Beltran	2021
Jordyn Wilson	2023
Gianna Koss	2024
Ava Arnold	2025

== Individual Records ==
Career Goals
Player	Years	Goals
Chrissie Abbott	2000–03	53
Katie Barnes	1998–2001	45
Michaela Abam	2014–17	42
Deana Everrett	2005–08	39
Frances Silva	2010–13	38

Season Goals
Player	Year	Goals
Chrissie Abbott	2002	20
Deana Everrett	2006	18
Katie Barnes	2000	17
Frances Silva	2013	15
Ashley Banks	2007	15
Chrissie Abbott	2001	15

Career Assists
Player	Years	Assists
Lisa Stoia	2000–03	33
Katie Barnes	1998–2001	30
Ashley Lawrence	2013–16	29
Ashley Banks	2004–07	26
Deana Everrett	2005–08	24

Season Assists
Player	Year	Assists
Frances Silva	2013	13
Lisa Stoia	2003	12
Kim Bonilla	2006	12
Taylor White	2025	10
Ashley Lawrence	2016	10
Katie Barnes	2001	10
Lisa Stoia	2002	10

Career Points
Player	Years	Points
Chrissie Abbott	2000–03	125
Katie Barnes	1998–2001	120
Deana Everrett	2005–08	102
Michaela Abam	2014–17	100
Frances Silva	2010–13	98

Season Points
Player	Year	Points
Chrissie Abbott	2002	47
Frances Silva	2013	43
Deana Everrett	2006	43
Katie Barnes	2000	43
Ashley Banks	2007	38

Career Saves
Player	Years	Saves
Stacy Adams	1996–98	347
Lana Bannerman	2003–06	241
Kerri Butler	2007–10	231
Sara Keane	2011–13	231
Kayza Massey	2019–23	207

Season Saves
Player	Year	Saves
Stacy Adams	1998	125
Stacy Adams	1997	113
Stacy Adams	1996	109
Melissa Haire	2000	88
Rylee Foster	2019	87
Kerri Butler	2010	87
