= Kadeisha Buchanan =

Canadian soccer player (born 1995)

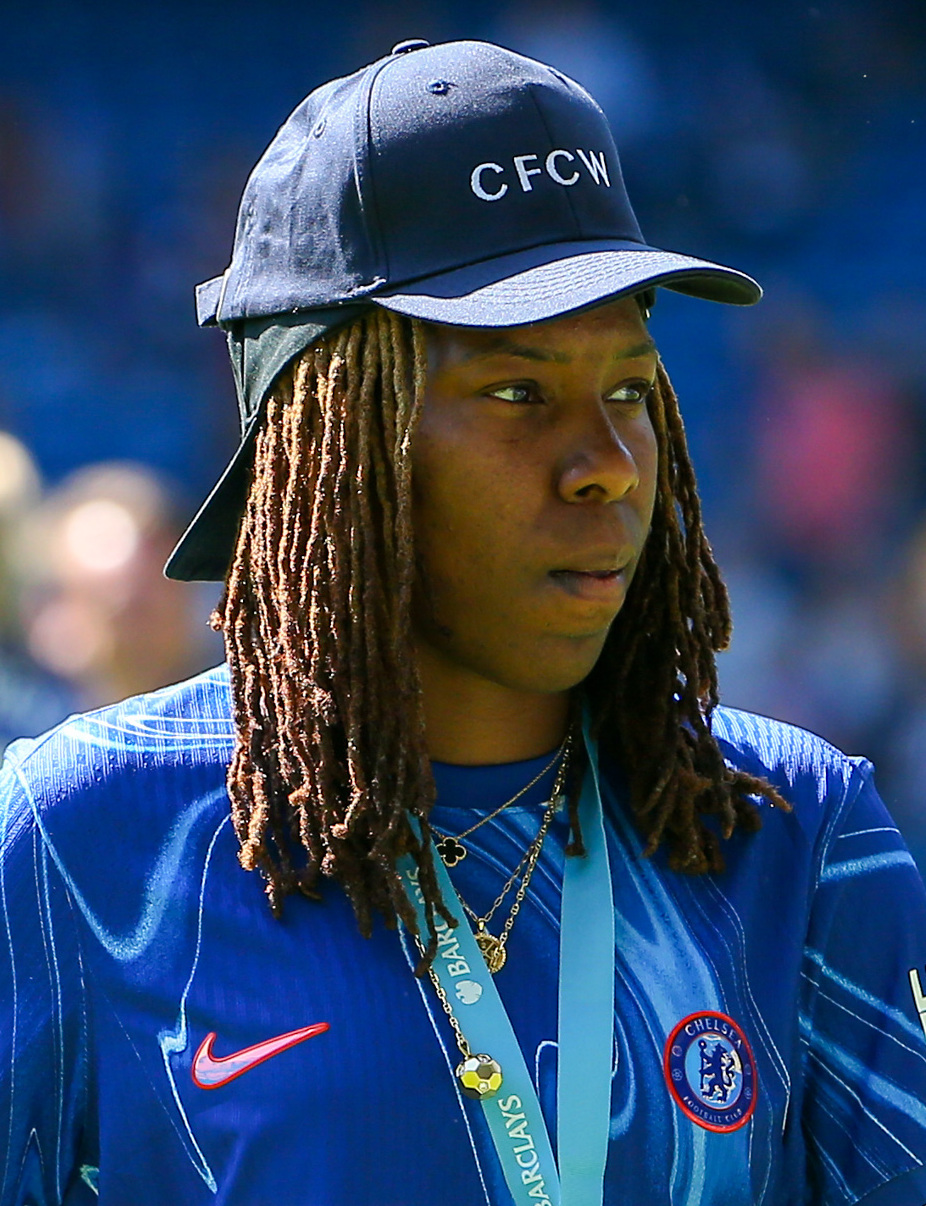
- Buchanan in 2025

Personal information
- Full name: Kadeisha Buchanan
- Date of birth: November 5, 1995 (age 31)
- Place of birth: Toronto, Ontario, Canada
- Height: 1.70 m (5 ft 7 in)
- Position: Centre-back

Team information
- Current team: Chelsea
- Number: 26

Youth career
- 2004–2010: Brams United SC
- 2011–2013: Erin Mills SC

College career
Years	Team	Apps	(Gls)
2013–2016	West Virginia Mountaineers	91	(8)

Senior career*
Years	Team	Apps	(Gls)
2013	Toronto Lady Lynx	4	(1)
2014	Ottawa Fury	1	(0)
2016	Vaughan Azzurri	1	(0)
2017–2022	Lyon	78	(6)
2022–	Chelsea	41	(1)

International career^{‡}
2012	Canada U-17	9	(0)
2014	Canada U-20	4	(0)
2015	Canada U-23	4	(0)
2013–	Canada	159	(6)
Medal record
Women's soccer
Representing Canada
CONCACAF W Championship
Runner-up	2018
Olympic Games
Gold medal – first place	2020 Tokyo	Team
Bronze medal – third place	2016 Rio	Team
- * Club domestic league appearances and goals as of November 14, 2026 ‡ National team caps and goals as of October 12, 2026

Kadeisha Buchanan (/kəˈdiːʃə ˈbjuːkənən/; born November 5, 1995) is a Canadian professional soccer player who plays as a centre-back for English Women's Super League club Chelsea and the Canada national team. Born in Toronto and raised in Brampton, Ontario, she is the youngest of seven girls in a single-parent home. Buchanan was only 17 when she made her debut for the national team on January 13, 2013.

Buchanan is a three-time Canadian Player of the Year, winning the award in the years of 2015, 2017, and 2020. At the 2015 World Cup, she won the FIFA Young Player Award.

== Early life ==
Born in Toronto and raised in Brampton, Ontario, Buchanan is the youngest of seven girls (ten siblings total) in a single-parent home. Buchanan's parents are originally from Jamaica; her father was born in Saint Thomas Parish and her mother in Montego Bay. Kadeisha grew up in the greater Toronto area, specifically Brampton and Mississauga. Buchanan attended Cardinal Leger Secondary School, where she played flag football, volleyball, basketball, and soccer. She was enrolled in general studies and earned a place on the Garret Ford Academic Honor Roll.

Buchanan played college soccer at West Virginia University, for the Mountaineers, where she co-captained the team, qualified for the Big 12 Commissioner's Honor Roll, and won numerous more accolades.

== Club career ==
=== Early career ===
In 2013, Buchanan played four games for the Toronto Lady Lynx, a USL W-League team. In 2014, she played a game for the Ottawa Fury, also in the W-League, right before they folded. In June 2016, Buchanan signed with Vaughan Azzurri of League1 Ontario to get game action prior to the 2016 Rio Olympics. She only played one game, however––a 9–0 win over Darby.

=== Lyon ===
Upon graduating from West Virginia University, Buchanan was a highly rated prospect prior to the 2017 NWSL College Draft. In December 2016, she was being linked with a move to Europe, along with fellow Canadian team member Ashley Lawrence. In January 2017, it was announced that Buchanan had signed with Olympique Lyonnais of Division 1. In June 2018, Buchanan would sign a three-year contract extension which would keep her with Lyon until 2022.

=== Chelsea ===
On June 10, 2022, Chelsea confirmed the signing of Buchanan on a three-year deal.

On April 17, 2024, Buchanan scored her first goal for Chelsea, scoring from a corner in a 3–0 win against Aston Villa in the WSL. She made her 50th appearance for the club during a 2–1 win over Arsenal in October 2024.

On 16 November 2024, it was confirmed Buchanan had suffered an ACL injury, during a game against Liverpool on 10 November.

Buchanan signed a contract extension with Chelsea on April 15, 2025, keeping her with the club to 2027.

On February 22, 2026, following 429 days of recovery from her ACL injury, Buchanan made her return to play, featuring in a 2–1 win over Manchester United in the FA Cup, with manager Sonia Bompastor saying of Buchanan's and her return "she is a great leader and she is a really important player for us. As you can see she hasn’t played for the last 15 months but she was able to come in the team today to play a tough game and bring her impact in the game."

== International career ==
Buchanan was 14 years old when she was recruited to the Canadian youth program in 2010. She won a silver medal at the 2012 CONCACAF W U-17 Championship in Guatemala. When she was called up to the Canadian women's national team on January 12, 2013, against China while still in high school, Buchanan became one of the youngest players on any women's national team.

Buchanan scored her first international goal against the United States on May 8, 2014, in Winnipeg, Manitoba, in front of the second largest crowd to ever watch a women's soccer game in Canada. The game ended in a 1–1 draw. Buchanan was also named Canada's Under-20 Women's Player of the Year in 2013, and anchored the host nation's defence at the 2014 Women's U-20 World Cup Canada in 2014.

In 2015, Buchanan established herself as one of the best defenders in the world, winning the Young Player Award in the 2015 FIFA World Cup, as well as being named Canadian Women's Player of the Year, and being nominated for the 2015 FIFA Ballon d'Or.

Buchanan was part of the Canada squad which won bronze at the 2016 Summer Olympics.

Buchanan was part of the squad for the 2019 Algarve Cup.

On May 25, 2019, Buchanan was named to the roster for the 2019 FIFA World Cup. She scored the winner in Canada's opening game at the tournament, a 1–0 group stage win over Cameroon.

On February 9, 2020, Buchanan played her 100th match for Canada in a 0–3 loss against the United States.

Buchanan was called up to the Canada squad for the delayed 2020 Summer Olympics. Going into her second Olympic tournament, she was identified in the media as one of Canada's most important players. She put the ball in the back of the net in Canada's 2–1 group stage victory against Chile, but it was ruled out as a handball, with the ball having hit Buchanan's hand following a ricochet off of goalkeeper Christiane Endler. She was a starter in the tournament's final, as Canada won on penalties against Sweden.

Buchanan was called up to the Canada squad for the 2022 CONCACAF W Championship, where Canada finished as runners-up.

Buchanan was called up to the 23-player Canada squad for the 2023 FIFA World Cup.

Buchanan was called up to the Canada squad for the 2024 CONCACAF W Gold Cup, which Canada finished as semifinalists.

Buchanan was called up to the Canada squad for the 2024 Summer Olympics.

Buchanan made her return to the national team after her ACL injury as she was called up for the 2026 FIFA Series in April 2026.

== Other work ==
In November 2025, it was announced that Buchanan would be launching a foundation, after having been selected by FIFA for funding, which would provide support for girls from single-parent families to play and pursue their aspirations in soccer. The KB3 Foundation was launched in February 2026, targeting financial support and mentorship to girls aged 12 to 16.

== Career statistics ==
=== Club ===
As of match played November 14, 2026

Appearances and goals by club, season and competition
Club	Season	League			National cup		League cup		Continental		Total	
Club	Season	Division	Apps	Goals	Apps	Goals	Apps	Goals	Apps	Goals	Apps	Goals
Lyon	2016–17	D1 Féminine	8	0	4	0	0	0	5	0	17	0
Lyon	2017–18	D1 Féminine	16	0	4	0	0	0	4	0	24	0
Lyon	2018–19	D1 Féminine	11	1	3	0	0	0	0	0	14	1
Lyon	2019–20	D1 Féminine	5	0	3	0	0	0	7	1	15	1
Lyon	2020–21	D1 Féminine	20	4	1	0	0	0	6	0	27	4
Lyon	2021–22	D1 Féminine	18	1	2	0	0	0	13	2	33	3
Lyon	Total		78	6	17	0	0	0	35	3	130	9
Chelsea	2022–23	Women's Super League	16	0	2	0	2	0	8	0	28	0
Chelsea	2023–24	Women's Super League	7	1	2	0	2	0	9	0	20	1
Chelsea	2024–25	Women's Super League	5	0	0	0	0	0	1	0	6	0
Chelsea	2025–26	Women's Super League	5	0	3	0	1	0	2	0	11	0
Chelsea	2026–27	Women's Super League	8	0	0	0	—		5	1	13	1
Chelsea	Total		41	1	7	0	5	0	25	1	78	2
Career total			119	7	24	0	5	0	60	4	208	11

=== International ===
As of match played October 12, 2026

Appearances and goals by national team and year
National team	Year	Apps	Goals
Canada	2013	15	0
Canada	2014	11	1
Canada	2015	18	1
Canada	2016	19	1
Canada	2017	9	0
Canada	2018	9	0
Canada	2019	14	1
Canada	2020	6	0
Canada	2021	12	0
Canada	2022	15	0
Canada	2023	12	0
Canada	2024	14	2
Canada	2026	5	0
Total		159	6

Scores and results list Canada's goal tally first, score column indicates score after each Buchanan goal.

List of international goals scored by Kadeisha Buchanan
No.	Date	Venue	Opponent	Score	Result	Competition
1	May 8, 2014	Investors Group Field, Winnipeg, Canada	United States	1–1	1–1	Friendly
2	January 11, 2015	Shenzhen Bay Sports Center, Shenzhen, China	South Korea	2–1	2–1	2015 Four Nations Tournament
3	February 14, 2016	BBVA Compass Stadium, Houston, United States	Trinidad and Tobago	3–0	6–0	2016 CONCACAF Women's Olympic Qualifying Championship
4	June 10, 2019	Stade de la Mosson, Montpellier, France	Cameroon	1–0	1–0	2019 FIFA Women's World Cup
5	February 22, 2024	Shell Energy Stadium, Houston, United States	El Salvador	5–0	6–0	2024 CONCACAF W Gold Cup
6	June 4, 2024	BMO Field, Toronto, Canada	Mexico	1–0	1–1	Friendly

== Honours ==
West Virginia Mountaineers

- Big 12 Conference women's soccer tournament: 2013, 2014, 2016

Olympique Lyonnais

- Division 1 Féminine: 2016–17, 2017–18, 2018–19, 2019–20, 2021–22
- Coupe de France: 2016–17, 2018–19, 2019–20
- UEFA Women's Champions League: 2016–17, 2017–18, 2018–19, 2019–20, 2021–22

Chelsea

- Women's Super League: 2022–23, 2023–24, 2024–25
- Women's FA Cup: 2022–23
- Women's League Cup: 2025–26

Canada U17

- CONCACAF Women's U-17 Championship: runner-up 2012

Canada

- Summer Olympics: 2024; 2020; bronze medal: 2016
- Algarve Cup: 2016
- Four Nations Tournament: 2015

Individual

- MAC Hermann Trophy: 2016
- Hardman Award: 2016
- Honda Sports Award: 2016
- Best Female College Athlete ESPY Award nominee: 2017
- CONCACAF Women's Olympic Qualifying Championship Best XI: 2016, 2020
- FIFA FIFPro World XI: 2015
- IFFHS Women’s CONCACAF Team of the Year: 2021
- Canadian Player of the Year: 2015, 2017, 2020
- FIFA Women's World Cup Best Young Player: 2015
- IFFHS CONCACAF Women Team of the Decade 2011–2020
- Big 12 Conference Defensive Player of the Year: 2013, 2014, 2015, 2016
- Big 12 Conference women's soccer tournament Defensive MVP: 2013, 2014, 2016

== See also ==
- List of women's footballers with 100 or more international caps
- List of Olympic medalists in football
- List of Canadian sports personalities
- List of Nike sponsorships
- List of LGBT sportspeople
