= 2014 Houston Dash season =

Houston Dash
2014 season
- President: Chris Canetti
- Head coach: Randy Waldrum
- National Women's Soccer League: 9th
- NWSL Championship: Did not qualify
- Top goalscorer: Nina Burger; Tiffany McCarty; Kealia Ohai (4 goals)
- Highest home attendance: 8,097 vs. Portland Thorns FC (April 12, 2014)
- Lowest home attendance: 3,561 vs. Washington Spirit (July 17, 2014)
Home colors	Away colors

The 2014 season was the Houston Dash's inaugural season as a professional women's soccer team. As the first expansion team to the National Women's Soccer League, United States' top-flight women's league, the Dash played a 24-game schedule that saw them compete against the eight other NWSL teams, playing each at home and away at least once. The Dash finished the season in last place and ended the season with 5 wins, 3 draws, and 16 losses and a -21 goal differential. The season for the Dash began on April 12, 2014, and concluded August 20, 2014 after the team failed to qualify for the playoffs.

== Background ==
On November 19, 2013, the Houston Dynamo began the initial talks of bringing a top flight women's professional soccer franchise to Houston. Just a week later, the effort was bolstered when the Dynamo began accepting refundable deposits for a potential NWSL expansion team. On December 11, 2013, the National Women's Soccer League announced that the Houston Dynamo and the city of Houston were awarded an expansion franchise to begin playing in the 2014 season. The following day, the Houston Dynamo held a press conference at BBVA Compass Stadium to formally announce the expansion club to the local and national media.

We're proud and excited to welcome the Houston Dash to the NWSL as the first expansion team in league history. The creation of the Dash will mean enhanced opportunities for female soccer players at the professional level as well as the chance for fans from another part of the country to watch and interact with some of the world's most talented players. We are thrilled at being able to add an organization as strong as the Houston Dynamo as we work toward continuing to build a sustainable league.

— NWSL Executive Director Cheryl Bailey

During the press conference on December 12, 2013, Houston Dynamo President Chris Canetti announced that the club would be named the Houston Dash and would share similar colors to the Dynamo: orange, black, and sky blue. The crest, which features a soccer ball along with the words "Houston Dash" with sky blue lines in the background, was unveiled. Also present at the announcement were Houston Mayor Annise Parker and NWSL Executive Director Cheryl Bailey.

On December 23, 2013, former Houston Dynamo player Brian Ching was named "managing director", putting him in charge of day-to-day duties on both the business and technical sides of under the supervision of Houston Dash and Dynamo team president Chris Canetti. Later that week, Ching hired former U.S. women's national team and FIFA Women's World Cup winning coach Tony DiCicco as a consultant to help the Dash in their search for a head coach and building a roster for the first season in the National Women's Soccer League.

On January 3, 2014, Randy Waldrum was named as the Dash's first head coach, having previously coached the Notre Dame Fighting Irish women's soccer team to two national titles. The first players to be named to the roster (Whitney Engen, Teresa Noyola and Melissa Tancredi) were awarded through the 2014 NWSL Player Allocation. Within a few days Tancredi was traded to the Chicago Red Stars for the Dash's first goalkeeper, Erin McLeod. The Dash later bolstered their roster with 10 additional players through the 2014 NWSL Expansion Draft.

Houston Dash 2014 NWSL Expansion Draft Selections
Pick	Player	Position	Team	Notes
1	Brittany Bock	Midfielder	Sky Blue FC	Sky Blue FC added Kendall Johnson to their protected list.
2	Tiffany McCarty	Forward	Washington Spirit	The Washington Spirit added Lori Lindsey to their protected list.
3	Lauren Sesselmann	Defender	FC Kansas City	FC Kansas City added Sarah Hagen to their protected list.
4	Meleana Shim	Midfielder	Portland Thorns FC	Portland Thorns FC added a "Discovery Player" to their protected list.
5	Ella Masar	Forward	Chicago Red Stars	The Chicago Red Stars added Alyssa Mautz to their protected list.
6	Meghan Klingenberg	Defender	Boston Breakers	With this selection, the Houston Dash may not take any additional players from the Boston Breakers.
7	Arianna Romero	Defender	Seattle Reign FC	The Seattle Reign FC added Kate Deines to their protected list.
8	Becky Edwards	Midfielder	Portland Thorns FC	With this selection, the Houston Dash may not take any additional players from the Portland Thorns FC.
9	Danesha Adams	Forward	Sky Blue FC	With this selection, the Houston Dash may not take any additional players from the Sky Blue FC.
10	Kika Toulouse	Defender	Washington Spirit	With this selection, the Houston Dash have completed their selections in the 2014 NWSL Expansion Draft.

The Dash then went on to trade Danesha Adams to the Washington Spirit for Stephanie Ochs and sent their 3rd pick in the 2014 NWSL College Draft to Chicago for Bianca Henninger to round out their off-season moves before the draft. The club also announced details of an open tryout for aspiring female soccer players born in 1996 and older to be held on Saturday, February 15 at Houston Amateur Sports Park. Dash head coach Randy Waldrum and managing director Brian Ching will evaluate all participants. Those identified as the tryout's best players will receive an invitation to participate with the team during its pre-season, scheduled to begin on March 10.

The second annual NWSL College Draft took place on January 17, 2014, in conjunction with the NSCAA Convention in Philadelphia. The draft order was determined by the final 2013 NWSL regular season standings. Because the Dash were not part of the 2013 season, their position in the draft was to be decided. Initially, according to reports, the Dash were to pick fifth in the first round (between the four teams that missed the 2013 playoffs and the four that made the playoffs), and first in the second and fourth rounds. After the 2014 allocations were released, this was later updated to give Houston the second pick in the first round and the first pick in the third round. After trading for an additional pick on draft day, the Dash left the college draft with four more players on their roster.

Houston Dash 2014 NWSL College Draft Selections
Round	Overall	Player	Position	College
1	2	Kealia Ohai	Forward	University of North Carolina at Chapel Hill
2	10	Rafaelle Souza	Forward	University of Mississippi
2	11	Marissa Diggs (Note: Washington Spirit → Seattle Reign FC → Portland Thorns FC → Houston Dash. 1 July 2013: Seattle Reign FC sent Lindsay Taylor and a conditional fourth-round pick in the 2014 NWSL College Draft to Washington Spirit in exchange for the Spirit's 2014 College Draft second-round selection. 10 Dec 2013: Seattle Reign FC sent defender Nikki Marshall and the No. 9 pick in the 2014 National Women's Soccer League College Draft to the Portland Thorns in exchange for Portland's No. 6 pick in the 2014 NWSL College Draft and a second-round pick in the 2015 Draft. 17 Jan 2014: Portland Thorns traded their 2nd round pick and a player to be named later to Houston Dash in exchange for Meleana Shim)	Defender	University of Central Florida
4	28	Jordan Jackson	Midfielder	University of Nebraska–Lincoln

Draft Notes:

The Houston Dash followed their draft moves by acquiring their first international signing, Japanese defender and 2011 FIFA Women's World Cup winner Aya "Same" Sameshima, on January 24, 2014. Per team and league policy, terms of the deal were not disclosed.

The Dash began the month of February by revealing their on-field look for 2014 with the unveiling of three sets of Nike kits on February 7 in the West Club of BBVA Compass Stadium. The home uniform features an orange jersey with white shorts, while the alternate uniform is a light blue shirt with white shorts. The Dash will wear a white top with orange and light blue on the sleeves with orange shorts for daily training sessions. BBVA Compass was also announced as the jersey sponsor, signing on a 5-year commitment.

The Dash athletes are exceptional role models for our city, and it is a great honor to see our logo on their jerseys.

— BBVA Compass Houston City President Mark Montgomery

BBVA Compass Houston City President Mark Montgomery said the bank will work with the Dash on several community initiatives, including renovating a house and hosting a youth soccer clinic in the East End, which will help introduce Houston's newest sports stars to their adopted city. The efforts will further the bank's partnership with the Dynamo and Dynamo Charities for their Building a Better Houston campaign, which was started in 2012 to revitalize the neighborhood around BBVA Compass Stadium.

On February 8, the club hosted "Dash Day" to give fans a first opportunity to meet players of the team before the start of the season. Fans would have the option to obtain player autographs, participate in Q&A and photo sessions.

On February 15, over 140 young women from the Houston area showed up at Houston Sports Park to tryout for the team's final roster spot in front of Head Coach Randy Waldrum and Managing Director Brian Ching. To round out news in February, Brian Ching confirmed KKHH radio host Sarah Pepper as the Dash's in-stadium announcer.

== Season review ==
=== Preseason ===
The Dash began their first preseason camp on March 10 at Houston Sports Park. Their first ever scrimmage took place on March 19 in a 4–0 defeat of the Rice Owls women's soccer team at HSP. After a Rice own goal gave them the lead, rookie Jordan Jackson and trialist Dominique Richardson alternated setting each other up for the second and third goals of the Dash before Teresa Noyola scored the fourth off a Kealia Ohai assist.

Three days later they picked up their second preseason win, 1–0, over the 2013 SEC Champion Texas A&M Aggies women's soccer team after Kealia Ohai got her first goal of the preseason from a Tiffany McCarty assist. Four days later, the Dash would have their first defeat of the preseason in a 3–1 loss to the Houston Dynamo Academy Under 15 boys team. The Dash would regroup and defeat the visiting Texas Tech Lady Raiders the following Saturday in a 7–0 win. The Dash then traveled up the road to College Station to face the Aggies at their place, where they would win 3–1 against the SEC Champions. The Houston Dash capped off their season by defeating cross-town club Houston Aces 7–1 in their BBVA Compass Stadium debut, exactly one week before their NWSL inaugural match.

On Monday, April 7, the Dash announced their 18-player roster for the NWSL season. The club also signed four more players before the first match of the season. The players signed were Lindsay Elston, Holly Hein, Osinachi Ohale and Dominique Richardson.

Date	Opponents	Ground	Result F–A	Scorers	Notes
March 19, 2014	Rice Owls	Houston Sports Park	4-0	2' (o.g.) Richardson 11', Jackson 43', Noyola 48'	First Dash preseason game
March 22, 2014	Texas A&M Aggies	Houston Sports Park	1-0	Ohai 7'	Texas A&M won the 2013 SEC Championship
March 26, 2014	Houston Dynamo U-16	Houston Sports Park	1-3	McCarty 35'	First preseason loss
March 29, 2014	Texas Tech Lady Raiders	Houston Sports Park	7–0	Washington 30', McCarty 32', 48', Elston 73', Ohai 77', Bock 87', Guajardo 90+'	Elston and Guajardo are trialist players
April 3, 2014	Texas A&M Aggies	Ellis Field	3-1	Jackson 9', Ohai 45', Masar 80'	First away preseason game
April 5, 2014	Houston Aces	BBVA Compass Stadium	7-1	Edwards 6', Masar 14', 53', 58', Ohai 24', 30', Bock 41'	Doubleheader with Houston Dynamo vs. FC Dallas

Colours: Green = Houston Dash win; Yellow = draw; Red = opponents win.

=== April ===
The Houston Dash debuted at home against the defending NWSL Champion Portland Thorns FC in front of 8,097 fans, the largest attendance for the first week of the season. Portland won 1–0, despite playing without Alex Morgan, on a game-winner by Allie Long. The Dash's Becky Edwards seemed to have scored the tying goal in stoppage time but her goal was ruled offside and the match ended shortly after. The Dash traveled to Harvard Stadium the following Sunday to face the Boston Breakers. Heather O'Reilly scored immediately within the first minute of play and would later assist Joanna Lohman in the 70th minute to overcome Ella Masar's tying goal in the 50th minute of the match. The home team held the lead and looked to be the victor into the last 10 minutes of play. A brace by Teresa Noyola, her second goal coming from a penalty kick, were enough to see the Dash shock the home crowd and earn their first franchise win. The Dash ended the month of April by visiting the league-leader Seattle Reign FC. Kim Little led the way for the Reign with two first-half goals (the only goals of the evening) as the team remained unbeaten and untied to top the NWSL standings.

Position at the end of April
Pos	Team	Pld	W	D	L	GF	GA	GD	Pts
6	Houston Dash	3	1	0	2	3	5	−2	3

=== May ===
The Houston Dash returned home to begin the most heavily scheduled month of its season. The first of these seven games featured FC Kansas City's star-studded squad of 2013 NWSL MVP Lauren Holiday, 2013 NWSL Defender of the Year Becky Sauerbrunn, 2013 NWSL Rookie of the Year Erika Tymrak, 2013 NWSL Goalkeeper of the Year Nicole Barnhart, along with United States national team players Amy LePeilbet and Amy Rodriguez. Kansas City came off a season that saw them sweep the 2013 NWSL awards with Vlatko Andonovski being named the coach of the year. The Blues proved to be too much star power for the Dash and cruised to a 4-nil victory, which saw the Dash left with 10 women after Osinachi Ohale's red card in the 58th minute.

The following week the Dash traveled to face the Chicago Red Stars at the Village of Lisle-Benedictine University Sports Complex. After a three-hour severe weather delay, the Houston Dash lost 1-nil to the Chicago Red Stars and fell to 1-4-0 (3 points) for the season. Dash goalkeeper Bianca Henninger made her first appearance, starting in place of the injured Erin McLeod, and held down the Houston defense with several diving saves until the 33rd minute, when a misplayed ball by Arianna Romero ended up at the feet of Chicago's Jen Hoy, who chipped Henninger and found the back of the net. The Houston Dash then returned to BBVA Compass Stadium to play a rematch of their inaugural NWSL match against the defending champion Portland Thorns FC. The rematch ended with the same result as the first time with Portland winning 1-nil, this time with a second-half goal by Jessica McDonald.

On May 18, the Houston Dash came from behind twice to earn a 2–2 draw on the road against FC Kansas City, ending their four-game losing streak and obtaining the first draw in franchise history. On May 23, the Houston Dash finally got their first goal at BBVA Compass Stadium, but it wasn't enough to get their first points at home as they fell 3–1 to the Chicago Red Stars. Three days later, the Dash came from behind twice to equalize before conceding a heart-breaking goal in stoppage time to lose 3–2 to the Washington Spirit. The Dash would finally close out one of their comebacks on the last day of the month in a 2–1 win at Abby Wambach's Western New York Flash. The win was the second in franchise history and featured goals from Kealia Ohai (her first for the club) and Nina Burger.

Position at the end of May
Pos	Team	Pld	W	D	L	GF	GA	GD	Pts
8	Houston Dash	10	2	1	7	10	20	−10	7

== Club ==
=== Coaching staff ===
Position	Staff
Head Coach	(United States) Randy Waldrum
Assistant coach	(England) Lee Cullip
Goalkeeper coach	(United States) Steve Branz
Head Athletic Trainer	(United States) Kristy Chavez

Updated to match played April 16, 2014
Source: Houston Dash

=== Other information ===
Owner	(United States) Philip Anschutz
Co-Owners	(United States) Oscar De La Hoya (United States) Gabriel Brener
President of Business Operations	(United States) Chris Canetti
Managing Director	(United States) Brian Ching
Ground (capacity and dimensions)	BBVA Compass Stadium (7,000 (22,039) / 115x70 yards)
Training ground	Houston Sports Park

Updated to match played March 22, 2014
Source: Houston Dash

== Squad ==
The following is the final list of players who were under contract with the Houston Dash up till the last day of the season. Players that were traded, waived, or otherwise removed from the team have been omitted but their stats may be found in the statistics section of this page.
Where a player has not declared an international allegiance, nation is determined by place of birth. Squad correct as of August 20, 2014.

Squad No.	Name	Nationality	Position(s)	Since	Date of birth (age)	Signed from	Games played	Goals scored
Goalkeepers
1	Erin McLeod	(Canada)	GK	2014	February 26, 1983 (age 43)	(United States) Chicago Red Stars	20	0
18	Bianca Henninger	(United States)	GK	2014	October 22, 1990 (age 36)	(United States) FC Kansas City	5	0
Defenders
2	Arianna Romero	(Mexico)	RB	2014	July 29, 1992 (age 34)	(United States) Seattle Reign FC	21	0
3	Whitney Engen (played for Tyresö FF until May 22)	(United States)	CB	2014	November 27, 1987 (age 38)	(Sweden) Tyresö FF	11	0
4	Lauren Sesselmann (inactive due to injury)	(Canada)	CB	2014	August 14, 1983 (age 43)	(United States) FC Kansas City	0	0 \|6
16	Kika Toulouse	(United States)	CB	2014	May 3, 1989 (age 37)	(United States) Washington Spirit	7	0
20	Osinachi Ohale	(Nigeria)	CB	2014	October 18, 1992 (age 34)	(Nigeria) Delta Queens	19	1
23	Marissa Diggs	(United States)	CB	2014	April 8, 1992 (age 34)	(United States) University of Central Florida	13	1
25	Meghan Klingenberg (played for Tyresö FF until May 22)	(United States)	LB	2014	August 2, 1988 (age 38)	(United States) Boston Breakers	7	0
Midfielders
8	Jordan Jackson	(United States)	CM	2014	September 19, 1990 (age 36)	(United States) University of Nebraska–Lincoln	20	2
9	Kaylyn Kyle	(Canada)	CM	2014	October 6, 1988 (age 38)	(United States) Boston Breakers	19	0
10	Teresa Noyola	(Mexico)	CM / AM / ST	2014	April 5, 1990 (age 36)	(United States) FC Kansas City	10	3
11	Brittany Bock (out for the 2014 season with a left ACL tear)	(United States)	CM	2014	April 11, 1987 (age 39)	(United States) Sky Blue FC	1	0
14	Becky Edwards	(United States)	CM	2014	May 22, 1988 (age 38)	(United States) Portland Thorns FC	23	0
24	Kelly McFarlane	(United States)	CM	2014	October 2, 1992 (age 34)	(United States) University of North Carolina at Chapel Hill	13	0
Forwards
6	Rafaelle Souza	(Brazil)	ST	2014	June 18, 1991 (age 35)	(United States) University of Mississippi	16	0
7	Kealia Ohai	(United States)	ST	2014	January 31, 1992 (age 34)	(United States) University of North Carolina at Chapel Hill	23	4
12	Tiffany McCarty	(United States)	ST	2014	December 14, 1990 (age 35)	(United States) Washington Spirit	20	4
13	Lindsay Elston	(United States)	ST	2014	April 30, 1991 (age 35)	(United States) University of Washington	5	0
19	Nina Burger	(Austria)	ST	2014	December 27, 1987 (age 38)	(Austria) SV Neulengbach	17	4
22	Stephanie Ochs	(United States)	ST	2014	August 29, 1990 (age 36)	(United States) Washington Spirit	24	0
30	Ella Masar	(United States)	ST	2014	April 3, 1986 (age 40)	(United States) Chicago Red Stars	18	3

=== NWSL roster ===
The active roster consists of 18-20 players, per NWSL rules. The following list is of players that were active for NWSL play on the last day season. Injured players are not included.
Where a player has not declared an international allegiance, nation is determined by place of birth. Squad correct as of August 20, 2014.

No.	Position	Nation	Player
1	GK	CAN	Erin McLeod (Al.)
2	DF	MEX	Arianna Romero (Al.)
3	DF	USA	Whitney Engen (Al.)
6	FW	BRA	Rafaelle Souza (Rk.)
7	FW	USA	Kealia Ohai (Rk.)
8	FW	USA	Jordan Jackson (Rk.)
9	MF	CAN	Kaylyn Kyle (Al.)
10	MF	MEX	Teresa Noyola (Al.)
12	FW	USA	Tiffany McCarty
13	FW	USA	Lindsay Elston
14	MF	USA	Becky Edwards
16	DF	USA	Kika Toulouse
18	GK	USA	Bianca Henninger
19	FW	AUT	Nina Burger
20	DF	NGR	Osinachi Ohale
22	FW	USA	Stephanie Ochs
23	DF	USA	Marissa Diggs (Rk.)
24	MF	USA	Kelly McFarlane (Rk.)
25	DF	USA	Meghan Klingenberg (Al.)
30	FW	USA	Ella Masar

== Statistics ==
=== Appearances and goals ===
No.	Pos	Nat	Player	Total		NWSL Regular Season	
No.	Pos	Nat	Player	Apps	Goals	Apps	Goals
1	GK	(Canada) CAN	Erin McLeod	20	0	20	0
2	DF	(Mexico) MEX	Arianna Romero	21	0	21	0
3	DF	(United States) USA	Whitney Engen	11	0	11	0
4	DF	(Canada) CAN	Lauren Sesselmann	0	0	0	0
6	FW	(Brazil) BRA	Rafaelle Souza	16	0	16	0
7	FW	(United States) USA	Kealia Ohai	23	4	23	4
8	FW	(United States) USA	Jordan Jackson	20	2	20	2
9	MF	(Canada) CAN	Kaylyn Kyle	19	0	19	0
10	MF	(Mexico) MEX	Teresa Noyola	10	3	10	3
11	MF	(United States) USA	Brittany Bock	1	0	1	0
12	FW	(United States) USA	Tiffany McCarty	20	4	20	4
14	MF	(United States) USA	Becky Edwards	23	0	23	0
16	DF	(United States) USA	Kika Toulouse	7	0	7	0
18	GK	(United States) USA	Bianca Henninger	5	0	5	0
19	FW	(Austria) AUT	Nina Burger	17	4	17	4
20	DF	(Nigeria) NGR	Osinachi Ohale	19	1	19	1
21	FW	(United States) USA	Melissa Henderson	9	0	9	0
22	DF	(United States) USA	Stephanie Ochs	24	0	24	0
23	DF	(United States) USA	Marissa Diggs	13	1	13	1
24	MF	(United States) USA	Kelly McFarlane	13	0	13	0
25	DF	(United States) USA	Meghan Klingenberg	7	0	7	0
30	FW	(United States) USA	Ella Masar	18	3	18	3
Players who left the club during the season: (Statistics shown are the appearances made and goals scored with the Houston Dash)
13	FW	(United States) USA	Lindsay Elston (Waived)	5	0	5	0
15	MF	(United States) USA	Dominique Richardson (Waived)	3	0	3	0
21	DF	(United States) USA	Holly Hein (Waived)	8	0	8	0
26	MF	(United States) USA	Nikki Washington (Traded)	2	0	2	0

Updated to match played August 20, 2014
Source: Competitive matches

=== Top scorers ===
Includes all competitive matches. The list is sorted by shirt number when total goals are equal.

Ran	No.	Pos	Nat	Name	NWSL Regular Season
1	7	FW	(United States)	Kealia Ohai	4
2	12	FW	(United States)	Tiffany McCarty	4
3	19	FW	(Austria)	Nina Burger	4
4	10	MF	(Mexico)	Teresa Noyola	3
5	30	FW	(United States)	Ella Masar	3
6	8	MF	(United States)	Jordan Jackson	2
7	20	DF	(Nigeria)	Osinachi Ohale	1
8	23	DF	(United States)	Marissa Diggs	1
				TOTAL	17

Last updated: August 20, 2014
Source: Competitive matches

Italic: denotes no longer with club.

=== Top assists ===
Includes all competitive matches. The list is sorted by shirt number when total assists are equal.

Ran	No.	Pos	Nat	Name	NWSL Regular Season	NWSL Championship Playoffs	Total
1	22	DF	(United States)	Stephanie Ochs	3	0	3
2	14	MF	(United States)	Becky Edwards	2	0	2
3	2	DF	(Mexico)	Arianna Romero	1	0	1
4	6	FW	(Brazil)	Rafaelle Souza	1	0	1
5	7	FW	(United States)	Kealia Ohai	1	0	1
6	9	MF	(Canada)	Kaylyn Kyle	1	0	1
7	19	FW	(Austria)	Nina Burger	1	0	1
8	30	FW	(United States)	Ella Masar	1	0	1
				TOTALS	11	0	11

Last updated: July 5, 2014
Source: Competitive matches

Italic: denotes no longer with club.

=== Clean sheets ===
Includes all competitive matches. The list is sorted by shirt number when total clean sheets are equal.

Ran	No.	Pos	Nat	Name	NWSL Regular Season
1	1	GK	(Canada)	Erin McLeod	2
				TOTAL	2

Last updated: August 20, 2014
Source: Competitive matches

Italic: denotes no longer with club.

=== Disciplinary record ===
Includes all competitive matches. The list is sorted by shirt number when total cards are equal.

R	No.	Pos	Nat	Name	NWSL Regular Season			NWSL Championship Playoffs			Total		
R	No.	Pos	Nat	Name	Yellow card	(yellow card) (yellow-red card)	Red card	Yellow card	(yellow card) (yellow-red card)	Red card	Yellow card	(yellow card) (yellow-red card)	Red card
1	20	DF	(Nigeria)	Osinachi Ohale	3	0	1	0	0	0	2	0	1
2	30	FW	(United States)	Ella Masar	4	0	0	0	0	0	3	0	0
3	7	FW	(United States)	Kealia Ohai	1	0	0	0	0	0	1	0	0
4	18	GK	(United States)	Bianca Henninger	1	0	0	0	0	0	1	0	0
5	19	FW	(Austria)	Nina Burger	1	0	0	0	0	0	1	0	0
6	21	DF	(United States)	Holly Hein	1	0	0	0	0	0	1	0	0
				TOTALS	11	0	1	0	0	0	11	0	1

Last updated: July 5, 2014
Source: Competitive matches

Italic: denotes no longer with club.

=== Captains ===
Includes all competitive matches. The list is sorted by shirt number when games are equal.

No.	Pos.	Name	Games
1	GK	(Canada) Erin McLeod	13
30	FW	(United States) Ella Masar	3

Last updated: July 11, 2014
Source: Competitive matches

Italic: denotes no longer with club.

=== Team statistics ===
	Total	Home	Away
Games played	15	8	7
Games won	4	1	3
Games drawn	1	0	1
Games lost	10	7	3
Biggest win	3–0 at Sky Blue	2-1 vs. Western New York	3–0 at Sky Blue
Biggest win (League)	3–0 at Sky Blue	2-1 vs. Western New York	3–0 at Sky Blue
Biggest win (Playoffs)	n/a	n/a	n/a
Biggest loss	0-4 vs. FC Kansas City	0-4 vs. FC Kansas City	0–2 at Seattle Reign FC
Biggest loss (League)	0-4 vs. FC Kansas City	0-4 vs. FC Kansas City	0–2 at Seattle Reign FC
Biggest loss (Playoffs)	n/a	n/a	n/a
Clean sheets	1	0	1
Goals scored	17	5	12
Goals conceded	28	17	11
Goal difference	-11	-12	+1
Average GF per game	1.13	0.63	1.71
Average GA per game	1.87	2.13	1.57
Yellow cards	11	4	7
Red cards	1	1	0
Most appearances	3 players tied at 15	4 players tied at 8	4 players tied at 7
Top scorer	Tiffany McCarty 4	4 players tied at 1	Tiffany McCarty 3
Worst discipline	Osinachi Ohale 2 (yellow card) 1 (red card)	Osinachi Ohale 1 (red card)	2 players tied at 2 (yellow card)
Penalties for	2/4 50%	1/3 33.33%	1/1 100%
Penalties against	2/3 66.67%	1/1 100%	1/2 50%
Points (League)	13 28.88%	3 12.50%	10 47.62%
Winning rate	26.67%	12.50%	42.86%

Last updated: July 5, 2014
Source: Competitive matches

=== International call-ups ===
No.	P	Name	Country	Level	Caps	Goals	Opposition	Competition
1	GK	Erin McLeod	Canada	Senior	3 Tot. 95	0 Tot. 0	vs. (United States) United States ✓ (January 31) vs. (United States) United States ✓ (May 8)	Friendly
1	GK	Erin McLeod	Canada	Senior	3 Tot. 95	0 Tot. 0	vs. (Finland) Finland ✗ (March 5 – Group Stage) vs. (Italy) Italy ✗ (March 7 – Group Stage) vs. (England) England ✓ (March 10 – Group Stage) vs. (Republic of Ireland) Ireland ✗ (March 12 – Fifth place match)	2014 Cyprus Cup
3	DF	Whitney Engen	United States	Senior	5 Tot. 15	0 Tot. 1	vs. (Canada) Canada ✓ (January 31) vs. (Russia) Russia ✗ (February 8) vs. (Russia) Russia ✓ (February 13) vs. (Canada) Canada ✓ (May 8)	Friendly
3	DF	Whitney Engen	United States	Senior	5 Tot. 15	0 Tot. 1	vs. (Japan) Japan ✓ (March 5 – Group Stage) vs. (Sweden) Sweden ✗ (March 7 – Group Stage) vs. (Denmark) Denmark ✓ (March 10 – Group Stage) vs. (North Korea) North Korea ✗ (March 12 – Seventh place match)	2014 Algarve Cup
4	DF	Lauren Sesselmann	Canada	Senior	1 Tot. 39	0 Tot. 0	vs. (United States) United States ✓ (January 31)	Friendly
4	DF	Lauren Sesselmann	Canada	Senior	1 Tot. 39	0 Tot. 0	vs. (Finland) Finland ✗ (March 5 – Group Stage) vs. (Italy) Italy ✗ (March 7 – Group Stage) vs. (England) England ✗ (March 10 – Group Stage) vs. (Republic of Ireland) Ireland ✗ (March 12 – Fifth place match)	2014 Cyprus Cup†
7	FW	Kealia Ohai	United States	Under-23	3 Tot. 3	1 Tot. 1	vs. (Japan) Japan ✓ (March 1) vs. (Sweden) Sweden ✓ (March 3) vs. (Norway) Norway ✓ (March 5)	La Manga Women Tournament 2014
9	MF	Kaylyn Kyle	Canada	Senior	1 Tot. 79	0 Tot. 5	vs. (United States) United States ✓ (May 8)	Friendly
25	DF	Meghan Klingenberg	United States	Senior	4 Tot. 8	0 Tot. 1	vs. (Canada) Canada ✓ (May 8)	Friendly
25	DF	Meghan Klingenberg	United States	Senior	4 Tot. 8	0 Tot. 1	vs. (Japan) Japan ✗ (March 5 – Group Stage) vs. (Sweden) Sweden ✓ (March 7 – Group Stage) vs. (Denmark) Denmark ✓ (March 10 – Group Stage) vs. (North Korea) North Korea ✓ (March 12 – Seventh place match)	2014 Algarve Cup

† Sesselmann was called up to the Canadian national team for the Cypress Cup but was not available for the tournament for cause of injury.

== Transfers ==
=== In ===
Squad #	Position	Player	Transferred from	Notes	Date	Source
3	DF	(United States) Whitney Engen	(Sweden) Tyresö FF	NWSL Player Allocation	January 3, 2014	
10	MF	(Mexico) Teresa Noyola	(United States) FC Kansas City	NWSL Player Allocation	January 3, 2014	
—	FW	(Canada) Melissa Tancredi	(Sweden) Dalsjöfors GoIF	NWSL Player Allocation	January 3, 2014	
1	GK	(Canada) Erin McLeod	(United States) Chicago Red Stars	Acquired in exchange for Melissa Tancredi	January 7, 2014	
11	MF	(United States) Brittany Bock	(United States) Sky Blue FC	2014 NWSL Expansion Draft Pick #1	January 10, 2014	
12	FW	(United States) Tiffany McCarty	(United States) Washington Spirit	2014 NWSL Expansion Draft Pick #2	January 10, 2014	
4	DF	(Canada) Lauren Sesselmann	(United States) FC Kansas City	2014 NWSL Expansion Draft Pick #3	January 10, 2014	
—	MF	(United States) Meleana Shim	(United States) Portland Thorns FC	2014 NWSL Expansion Draft Pick #4	January 10, 2014	
30	FW	(United States) Ella Masar	(United States) Chicago Red Stars	2014 NWSL Expansion Draft Pick #5	January 10, 2014	
25	DF	(United States) Meghan Klingenberg	(United States) Boston Breakers	2014 NWSL Expansion Draft Pick #6	January 10, 2014	
2	DF	(Mexico) Arianna Romero	(United States) Seattle Reign FC	2014 NWSL Expansion Draft Pick #7	January 10, 2014	
14	MF	(United States) Becky Edwards	(United States) Portland Thorns FC	2014 NWSL Expansion Draft Pick #8	January 10, 2014	
—	FW	(United States) Danesha Adams	(United States) Sky Blue FC	2014 NWSL Expansion Draft Pick #9	January 10, 2014	
16	DF	(United States) Gabriella Toulouse	(United States) Washington Spirit	2014 NWSL Expansion Draft Pick #10	January 10, 2014	
18	GK	(United States) Bianca Henninger	(United States) FC Kansas City	Acquired in exchange for Dash's third-round selection in the 2014 NWSL College Draft	January 13, 2014	
22	FW	(United States) Stephanie Ochs	(United States) Washington Spirit	Acquired in exchange for Danesha Adams	January 13, 2014	
7	FW	(United States) Kealia Ohai	(United States) University of North Carolina at Chapel Hill	Selected in the first round (No. 2 overall) of the 2014 NWSL College Draft	January 17, 2014	
6	FW	(Brazil) Rafaelle Souza	(United States) University of Mississippi	Selected in the second round (No. 10 overall) of the 2014 NWSL College Draft	January 17, 2014	
26	MF	(United States) Nikki Washington	(United States) Portland Thorns FC	Acquired in exchange for the No. 11 overall pick in the 2014 NWSL College Draft and Meleana Shim	January 17, 2014	
23	DF	(United States) Marissa Diggs	(United States) University Of Central Florida	Selected in the second round (No. 11 overall) of the 2014 NWSL College Draft	January 17, 2014	
8	MF	(United States) Jordan Jackson	(United States) University of Nebraska–Lincoln	Selected in the fourth round (No. 28 overall) of the 2014 NWSL College Draft	January 17, 2014	
5	DF	(Japan) Aya Sameshima	(Japan) Vegalta Sendai	First international signing for the Dash. Terms not disclosed.	January 24, 2014	
13	FW	(United States) Lindsay Elston	(United States) University of Washington	Signed after having been on trial with the club since the start of preseason on March 10.	April 11, 2014	
15	MF	(United States) Dominique Richardson	(United States) University of Missouri	Signed after having been on trial with the club since the start of preseason on March 10.	April 11, 2014	
20	DF	(Nigeria) Osinachi Ohale	(Nigeria) Delta Queens	Signed after joining as a trialist on March 29. Will occupy an international spot.	April 11, 2014	
21	DF	(United States) Holly Hein	(United States) University of Michigan	Signed after having been on trial with the club since the start of preseason on March 10.	April 11, 2014	
9	MF	(Canada) Kaylyn Kyle	(United States) Boston Breakers	Acquired in exchange for Nikki Washington. Kyle is allocated by the Canadian Soccer Association.	April 29, 2014	
19	FW	(Austria) Nina Burger	(Austria) SV Neulengbach	Burger scored 226 goals in her nine years with Neulengbach, claiming the league scoring title six times and was voted player of the year in 2010. At the time of the trade, Burger topped the ÖFB-Frauenliga scoring charts for the 2013–14 season with 20 goals in 12 games. Terms not disclosed.	April 30, 2014	
24	MF	(United States) Kelly McFarlane	(United States) University of North Carolina at Chapel Hill	Signed as a discovery player.	May 14, 2014	

=== Out ===
Squad #	Position	Player	Transferred To	Notes	Date	Source
—	FW	(Canada) Melissa Tancredi	(United States) Chicago Red Stars	Traded in exchange for Erin McLeod	January 7, 2014	
—	FW	(United States) Danesha Adams	(United States) Washington Spirit	Traded in exchange for Stephanie Ochs	January 13, 2014	
—	MF	(United States) Meleana Shim	(United States) Portland Thorns FC	Traded in exchange for the No. 11 overall pick in the 2014 NWSL College Draft and Nikki Washington	January 17, 2014	
26	MF	(United States) Nikki Washington	(United States) Boston Breakers	Traded in exchange for Kaylyn Kyle	April 29, 2014	
15	MF	(United States) Dominique Richardson	Free agent	Waived	May 16, 2014	

=== Trialists ===
Players on trial are invited to train with the team but do not have a contract with the club.

Squad #	Position	Player	Previous club	Notes	Date	Source
—	MF	(United States) Sara Campbell	(United States) Seattle Sounders Women	Preseason camp	March 10, 2014—April 7, 2014	
13	MF	(United States) Lindsay Elston	(United States) University of Washington	Preseason camp	March 10, 2014—April 11, 2014	
—	FW	(Mexico) Anisa Guajardo	(United States) Boston Breakers	Preseason camp	March 10, 2014—April 7, 2014	
21	DF	(United States) Holly Hein	(United States) University of Michigan	Preseason camp	March 10, 2014—April 11, 2014	
—	DF	(United States) Katie Kelly	(United States) FC Kansas City	Preseason camp	March 10, 2014—April 7, 2014	
—	GK	(United States) Megan Kinneman	(United States) Louisiana State University	Preseason camp	March 10, 2014—April 7, 2014	
—	MF	(United States) Tori McCombs	(United States) University of Michigan	Preseason camp	March 10, 2014—April 7, 2014	
—	MF	(United States) Emilee O'Neil	(United States) Portland Thorns FC	Preseason camp	March 10, 2014—April 7, 2014	
15	MF	(United States) Dominique Richardson	(United States) University of Missouri	Preseason camp	March 10, 2014—April 11, 2014	
—	MF	(Israel) Diana Redman	(United States) Pali Blues	Preseason camp	March 10, 2014—April 7, 2014	
20	DF	(Nigeria) Osinachi Ohale	(Nigeria) Delta Queens	Joined as a trialist on March 29.	March 29, 2014—April 11, 2014	

== Standings and match results ==
=== National Women's Soccer League ===
==== League standings ====
Pos	Team	Pld	W	D	L	GF	GA	GD	Pts	Qualification
1	Seattle Reign FC	24	16	6	2	50	20	+30	54	NWSL Shield
2	FC Kansas City (C)	24	12	5	7	39	32	+7	41	NWSL Playoffs
3	Portland Thorns FC	24	10	6	8	39	35	+4	36	NWSL Playoffs
4	Washington Spirit	24	10	5	9	36	43	−7	35	NWSL Playoffs
5	Chicago Red Stars	24	9	8	7	32	26	+6	35	
6	Sky Blue FC	24	9	7	8	30	37	−7	34	
7	Western New York Flash	24	8	4	12	42	38	+4	28	
8	Boston Breakers	24	6	2	16	37	53	−16	20	
9	Houston Dash	24	5	3	16	23	44	−21	18	

Source: NWSL
Rules for classification: Tiebreakers
(C) Champions

==== Results summary ====
Overall								Home						Away					
Pld	W	D	L	GF	GA	GD	Pts	W	D	L	GF	GA	GD	W	D	L	GF	GA	GD
20	5	3	12	20	30	−10	18	2	1	9	8	19	−11	3	2	3	12	11	+1

Last updated: July 26, 2014.
Source: National Women's Soccer League

==== Results by matchday ====
Matchday	1	2	3	4	5	6	7	8	9	10	11	12	13	14	15	16	17	18	19	20	21	22	23	24
Stadium	H	A	A	H	A	H	A	H	A	A	A	H	H	H	A	H	H	H	A	H	A	A	H	A
Result	L	W	L	L	L	L	D	L	L	W	W	W	L	L	P	L	W	D	D	L	L	L	L	L
Position	7	6	6	9	8	8	8	8	8	8	7	7	8	8		8	8	8	8	8	8	8	8	8

Source: HoustonDashSoccer.com
A = Away; H = Home; W = Win; D = Draw; L = Loss; P = Postponed

==== Matches ====
April 12, 2014 1	Houston Dash	0–1	Portland Thorns FC	Houston
07:00 p.m. CT	Ella Masar (yellow card) 74'	Report; Report 2	Long (yellow card) 15' (goal) 24'	Stadium: BBVA Compass Stadium; Attendance: 8,097; Referee: Christina Unkel

April 20, 2014 2	Boston Breakers	2–3	Houston Dash	Boston
06:30 p.m. ET	O'Reilly 1' (yellow card) 85'; Naeher (yellow card) 58'; Lohman 70'; Jones (yellow card) 79'	Report	Masar 50'; Noyola 81' 85' (pen.)	Stadium: Harvard Stadium; Attendance: 2,018; Referee: Josh Wilkens

April 27, 2014 3	Seattle Reign FC	2–0	Houston Dash	Seattle
04:00 p.m. PT	Little 19' (pen.) 38'; Reed (yellow card) 36'; Winters (yellow card) 63'	Report	Masar (yellow card) 2'; Ohale (yellow card) 77'	Stadium: Memorial Stadium; Attendance: 2,290; Referee: Dimitar Chavdarov

May 3, 2014 4	Houston Dash	0–4	FC Kansas City	Houston
07:00 p.m. CT	Ohale (red card) 58'; Hein (yellow card) 72'	Report	Bogus 13'; Rodriguez 48'; Tymrak 80'; Silva 89'	Stadium: BBVA Compass Stadium; Attendance: 5,198; Referee: Juliana Duncan

May 11, 2014 5	Chicago Red Stars	1–0	Houston Dash	Lisle, Illinois
08:00 p.m. CT	Hoy 33'; Leon (yellow card) 59'	Report	Masar (yellow card) 64'; Henninger (yellow card) 75'	Stadium: Village of Lisle-Benedictine University Sports Complex; Attendance: 1,039; Referee: Miguel Panduro

May 14, 2014 6	Houston Dash	0–1	Portland Thorns FC	Houston
07:00 p.m. CT	Ohai (yellow card) 76'	Report	McDonald 57'; Brooks (yellow card) 91+'	Stadium: BBVA Compass Stadium; Attendance: 3,931; Referee: Josh Wilkens

May 18, 2014 7	FC Kansas City	2–2	Houston Dash	Kansas City
05:00 p.m. CT	Holiday 2'; Tymrak 36'; Phillips (yellow card) 80'	Report	Jackson 20'; Burger (yellow card) 65'; McCarty 78'; Ohale (yellow card) 90'	Stadium: Durwood Soccer Stadium; Attendance: 1,483; Referee: Elvis Mahmutovic

May 23, 2014 8	Houston Dash	1–3	Chicago Red Stars	Houston
07:00 p.m. CT	Masar 51' (yellow card) 57'	Report	DiBernardo 10' (pen.); Mautz (yellow card) 24' (goal) 54'; Hoy 62'; Tancredi (yellow card) 75' (yellow card) 89' (yellow-red card); Quon (yellow card) 78'	Stadium: BBVA Compass Stadium; Attendance: 4,868; Referee: Timon Berry

May 26, 2014 9	Washington Spirit	3–2	Houston Dash	Germantown, Maryland
04:00 p.m. ET	Matheson 4'; Taylor 38'; Nairn 93+'	Report	Burger 12'; Ohale 77'	Stadium: Maryland SoccerPlex; Attendance: 2,865; Referee: Matthew Franz

May 31, 2014 10	Western New York Flash	1–2	Houston Dash	Rochester, New York
07:00 p.m. ET	Zerboni 44'		Ohale (yellow card) 9'; Ohai 51'; Burger 73'	Stadium: Sahlen's Stadium; Attendance: 3,555; Referee: Kristen Salazar

Jun 8, 2014 11	Sky Blue FC	0–3	Houston Dash	Piscataway, New Jersey
18:00	Freels (yellow card) 86'		McCarty 10', 79'; Masar 20'	Stadium: Yurcak Field

Jun 11, 2014 12	Houston Dash	2–1	Western New York Flash	Houston, Texas
19:30	McCarty 39'; Noyola 65' (pen.)		Martin 62'	Stadium: BBVA Compass Stadium

Jun 14, 2014 13	Houston Dash	1–2	FC Kansas City	Houston, Texas
21:00	Edwards 79'		Richmond 66'; Silva 90+4'	Stadium: BBVA Compass Stadium

Jun 28, 2014 14	Houston Dash	0–1	Washington Spirit	Houston, Texas
21:00			Taylor 62'	Stadium: BBVA Compass Stadium

Jul 2, 2014 15	Sky Blue FC	postponed	Houston Dash	Piscataway, New Jersey
19:00				Stadium: Yurcak Field
Note: Match was postponed due to thunderstorms. It was rescheduled for August 20, 2014.

Jul 5, 2014 16	Houston Dash	1–4	Western New York Flash	Houston, Texas
21:00	Jackson 81'		Spencer 13'; Kerr 28'; Bermudez 80'; Edwards 85' (o.g.)	Stadium: BBVA Compass Stadium

Jul 11, 2014 17	Houston Dash	2–1	Boston Breakers	Houston, Texas
21:00	Ohai 56', 60'; Edwards (yellow card) 73'		Schoepfer 5'; Jones (yellow card) 90+3'	Stadium: BBVA Compass Stadium

Jul 17, 2014 18	Houston Dash	1–1	Washington Spirit	Houston, Texas
21:00	Diggs 74'		De Vanna 19'	Stadium: BBVA Compass Stadium

Jul 26, 2014 19	Chicago Red Stars	0–0	Houston Dash	Lisle, Illinois
14:00	Erceg (yellow card) 61'; Mautz (yellow card) 90+2'	Summary	Osinachi Ohale (yellow card) 84'	Stadium: Benedictine U. Sports Complex Stadium; Attendance: 1,494; Referee: (United States) Christina Unkel

Jul 30, 2014 20	Houston Dash	1–4	Seattle Reign FC	Houston, Texas
21:00	Ohai 56'		Leroux 2'; Little 27', 78'; Rapinoe 48'	Stadium: BBVA Compass Stadium

Aug 3, 2014 21	Portland Thorns FC	1–0	Houston Dash	Portland, Oregon
22:00	Boquete 54'; Marshall		Edwards (yellow card) 45'	Stadium: Providence Park

Aug 6, 2014 22	Seattle Reign FC	4–1	Houston Dash	Seattle, Washington
22:00	Kawasumi 31', 34'; Goebel 40'; Little 63'		Jackson 83'	Stadium: Memorial Stadium

Aug 9, 2014 23	Houston Dash	1–3	Sky Blue FC	Houston, Texas
21:00	Edwards (yellow card) 38'; Romero (yellow card) 73'; Burger 86'		Nadim (yellow card) 23' (goal) 39', 74', 90+2'; Nick (yellow card) 62'	Stadium: BBVA Compass Stadium

Aug 17, 2014 24	Boston Breakers	1–0	Houston Dash	Boston, Massachusetts
18:30	Mewis 77'			Stadium: Harvard Stadium

Aug 20, 2014 15	Sky Blue FC	1-0	Houston Dash	Piscataway, New Jersey
19:00	Lisonbee Cutshall 18'; Nick (yellow card) 72'		Rafaelle Souza (yellow card) 85'	Stadium: Yurcak Field
Note: This match was originally scheduled to be played on July 2.

== Squad statistics ==
Key to positions: FW – Forward, MF – Midfielder, DF – Defender, GK – Goalkeeper

N	Pos	Player	GP	GS	Min	G	A	WG	Shot	SOG	Cro	CK	Off	Foul	FS	YC	RC
11	MF	Brittany Bock	1	1	23	0	0	0	0	0	0	0	0	0	0	0	0
19	FW	Nina Burger	17	15	978	4	1	1	17	9	0	0	10	9	7	1	0
23	DF	Marissa Diggs	13	11	1080	1	1	0	5	2	0	0	0	4	8	0	0
14	MF	Becky Edwards	23	23	2070	0	2	0	17	8	2	0	1	29	30	3	0
13	MF	Lindsay Elston	5	1	206	0	0	0	2	2	0	0	1	1	0	0	0
3	FW	Whitney Engen	11	11	978	0	0	0	2	0	0	1	0	1	2	0	0
21	DF	Holly Hein	8	7	657	0	0	0	0	0	0	0	0	3	7	1	0
21	FW	Melissa Henderson	9	8	629	0	0	0	6	5	0	0	1	1	2	0	0
8	MF	Jordan Jackson	20	13	1206	2	1	0	17	8	1	6	4	10	9	0	0
25	DF	Meghan Klingenberg	7	7	607	0	0	0	2	0	2	6	0	3	3	0	0
9	MF	Kaylyn Kyle	19	18	1626	0	2	0	9	7	1	0	6	29	14	2	0
30	FW	Ella Masar	18	14	1152	3	1	0	17	10	0	1	5	22	11	4	0
12	FW	Tiffany McCarty	20	11	1148	4	1	1	24	15	0	0	9	11	11	0	0
5	MF	Tori McCombs	1	0	19	0	0	0	0	0	0	0	0	1	0	0	0
24	MF	Kelly McFarlane	13	5	596	0	1	0	1	0	0	0	0	9	3	0	0
10	MF	Teresa Noyola	10	3	431	3	0	2	7	6	0	9	0	1	3	0	0
22	FW	Stephanie Ochs	24	19	1804	0	2	0	15	6	1	73	2	16	9	0	0
7	FW	Kealia Ohai	23	21	1817	4	1	1	46	22	3	0	14	17	9	1	0
20	DF	Osinachi Ohale	19	18	1555	1	0	0	2	2	0	0	1	14	4	4	1
15	MF	Dominique Richardson	2	1	92	0	0	0	0	0	0	0	0	0	1	0	0
2	MF	Arianna Romero	21	19	1765	0	0	0	6	4	1	0	0	19	8	1	0
6	MF	Rafaelle Souza	16	6	507	0	1	0	5	4	0	1	0	10	4	1	0
16	DF	Kika Toulouse	7	5	375	0	0	0	3	2	0	4	0	3	2	0	0
26	FW	Nikki Washington	3	3	247	0	0	0	0	0	0	13	0	1	2	0	0

N	Pos	Goal keeper	GP	GS	Min	W	L	T	Shot	SOG	Sav	GA	GA/G	Pen	PKF	SO
18	GK	Bianca Henninger	5	5	405	1	4	0	69	43	33	9	1.8	0	0	0
1	GK	Erin McLeod	20	19	1755	4	12	3	247	120	83	35	1.75	2	3	2

== Honors and awards ==
=== NWSL Player of the Week ===
Week	Result	Player	Ref.
2	Won	(Mexico) Teresa Noyola	
