= 2014 NWSL College Draft =

Soccer draft

General information
- Sport: Soccer
- Date: January 17, 2014
- Time: 10:00 AM ET
- Location: Philadelphia, Pennsylvania

Overview
- 36 total selections in 4 rounds
- First selection: Crystal Dunn, Washington Spirit
- Most selections: FC Kansas City and Boston Breakers (6 picks)
- Fewest selections: Portland Thorns FC (2 picks)

The 2014 NWSL College Draft was the second annual meeting of National Women's Soccer League (NWSL) franchises to select eligible college players. It was held on January 17, 2014, at the NSCAA Convention in Philadelphia, Pennsylvania, and was open to the public.

== Format ==
- Draft order was determined by the final 2013 regular season standings.
- The Houston Dash, the expansion team associated with the Houston Dynamo, then received the fifth pick in the first round, between the four teams that missed the 2013 playoffs and the four that made the playoffs, and first pick in the second and fourth rounds. After the 2014 allocations were released, this was later updated to give Houston the second pick in the first round and the first pick in the third round.

== Results ==
=== Key ===
^{+}	Denotes player who has been selected as NWSL Most Valuable Player
^{*}	Denotes player who has been selected for an NWSL Best XI or NWSL Second XI team
^{^}	Denotes player who has been selected as NWSL Rookie of the Year
^{#}	Denotes player who has never appeared in an NWSL regular season or playoff game

=== Picks ===
Round	Pick	Nat.	Player	Pos.	NWSL team	Note	College
Round 1	1	(United States)	Crystal Dunn^{+*}	F	Washington Spirit		North Carolina
Round 1	2	(United States)	Kealia Ohai^{*}	F	Houston Dash		North Carolina
Round 1	3	(United States)	Julie Johnston^{*^}	D	Chicago Red Stars	(Note: Seattle Reign FC → Chicago Red Stars. March 1, 2013: Seattle Reign FC sent their first-round selection in the 2014 draft plus future considerations to Chicago Red Stars in exchange for midfielder Keelin Winters and Chicago's 4th round pick.)	Santa Clara
Round 1	4	(United States)	Vanessa DiBernardo^{*}	M	Chicago Red Stars		Illinois
Round 1	5	(United States)	Kassey Kallman	D	FC Kansas City	(Note: Boston Breakers → FC Kansas City. October 17, 2013: Boston Breakers sent their first-round selection in the 2014 draft to FC Kansas City in exchange for forward Courtney Jones and FCKC's first-round pick.)	Florida State
Round 1	6	(United States)	Maya Hayes	F	Sky Blue FC		Penn State
Round 1	7	(United States)	Amanda Frisbie	D	Seattle Reign FC	(Note: Portland Thorns FC → Seattle Reign. December 10, 2013: Seattle Reign FC sent defender Nikki Marshall and the No. 9 pick in the 2014 National Women's Soccer League College Draft to the Portland Thorns in exchange for Portland's No. 6 pick in the 2014 NWSL College Draft and a second-round pick in the 2015 Draft.)	Portland
Round 1	8	(Canada)	Nkem Ezurike	F	Boston Breakers	(Note: FC Kansas City → Boston Breakers. October 17, 2013: FC Kansas City sent forward Courtney Jones and their first-round pick to Boston Breakers in exchange for Boston's first-round selection in the 2014 draft.)	Michigan
Round 1	9	(United States)	Courtney Verloo	F	Western New York Flash		Stanford
Round 2	10	(Brazil)	Rafaelle Souza	F	Houston Dash		Ole Miss
Round 2	11	(United States)	Marissa Diggs	D	Houston Dash	(Note: Washington Spirit → Seattle Reign FC → Portland Thorns FC → Houston Dash. July 1, 2013: Seattle Reign FC sent Lindsay Taylor and a conditional fourth-round pick in the 2014 NWSL College Draft to Washington Spirit in exchange for the Spirit's 2014 College Draft second-round selection. December 10, 2013: Seattle Reign FC sent defender Nikki Marshall and the No. 9 pick in the 2014 National Women's Soccer League College Draft to the Portland Thorns in exchange for Portland's No. 6 pick in the 2014 NWSL College Draft and a second-round pick in the 2015 Draft. January 17, 2014: Portland Thorns traded their 2nd round pick and a player to be named later to Houston Dash in exchange for Meleana Shim)	UCF
Round 2	12	(United States)	Morgan Marlborough	F	FC Kansas City	(Note: Seattle Reign FC → FC Kansas City. July 1, 2013: Seattle Reign FC traded midfielder Teresa Noyola, their second-round pick in the 2014 college draft and the rights to unsigned defender Nikki Krzysik to FC Kansas City for forward Renae Cuéllar and FC Kansas City's third-round pick in the 2014 college draft.)	Santa Clara
Round 2	13	(Iceland)	Natasha Anasi^{#}	D	Boston Breakers	(Note: Chicago Red Stars → Boston Breakers. October 29, 2013: Chicago Red Stars acquired the rights to defender Casey Short along with a third-round pick in the 2015 National Women's Soccer League College Draft in exchange for the No. 11 overall pick in the 2014 NWSL College Draft.)	Duke
Round 2	14	(United States)	Cloee Colohan^{#}	M	Western New York Flash	(Note: Boston Breakers → Western New York Flash. April 29, 2013: Boston Breakers acquired defender Melinda Mercado from the Western New York Flash in exchange for their second round pick in the 2014 National Women's Soccer League College Draft)	BYU
Round 2	15	(United States)	Hayley Haagsma	D	Sky Blue FC		Texas Tech
Round 2	16	(United States)	Jenna Richmond	M	FC Kansas City	(Note: Portland Thorns FC → FC Kansas City. January 13, 2014: Portland Thorns send their second second-round pick to FC Kansas City and receive Sinead Farrelly.)	UCLA
Round 2	17	(United States)	Megan Brigman	D	Seattle Reign FC	(Note: FC Kansas City → Seattle Reign FC. December 5, 2013: FC Kansas City sent their second-round pick (15th overall) to Seattle Reign FC and their third-round pick in 2015 in exchange for Liz Bogus and the 17th overall selection (third-round) in the 2014 draft)	North Carolina
Round 2	18	(United States)	Kelsey Wys	G	Western New York Flash		Florida State
Round 3	19	(United States)	Frances Silva	F	FC Kansas City	(Note: Houston Dash → FC Kansas City. January 13, 2014: FC Kansas City has acquired the 19th pick from the Houston Dash in exchange for Bianca Henninger)	West Virginia
Round 3	20	(United States)	Mandy Laddish	M	FC Kansas City	(Note: Washington Spirit → Seattle Reign FC → FC Kansas City. October 25, 2013: Washington Spirit sent the rights to defenders Alina Garciamendez and Nikki Marshall and the 17th overall pick in the 2014 Draft to Seattle Reign FC in exchange for forward Renae Cuéllar, the 23rd overall selection in the 2014 draft, and the rights to forward Jodie Taylor. December 5, 2013: FC Kansas City sent their second-round pick (15th overall) to Seattle Reign FC and their third-round pick in 2015 in exchange for Liz Bogus and the 17th overall selection (third-round) in the 2014 draft)	Notre Dame
Round 3	21	(United States)	Jazmine Reeves	F	Boston Breakers	(Note: Seattle Reign FC → Boston Breakers. October 23, 2013: Seattle Reign FC has acquired midfielder Mariah Nogueira from the Boston Breakers in exchange for Seattle's third round-pick (No. 18 overall) in the 2014 NWSL College Draft and Reign FC's third-round pick in the 2015 draft)	Virginia Tech
Round 3	22	(United States)	Hayley Brock	F	Chicago Red Stars		Maryland
Round 3	23	(United States)	Mollie Pathman	M	Boston Breakers		Duke
Round 3	24	(Chinese Taipei)	Michelle Pao^{#}	M	Sky Blue FC		Pepperdine
Round 3	25	(United States)	Emily Menges^{*}	D	Portland Thorns FC		Georgetown
Round 3	26	(United States)	Molly Menchel	D	Washington Spirit	(Note: FC Kansas City → Seattle Reign FC → Washington Spirit. July 1, 2013: Seattle Reign FC traded midfielder Teresa Noyola, their second-round pick in the 2014 college draft and the rights to unsigned defender Nikki Krzysik to FC Kansas City for forward Renae Cuéllar and FC Kansas City's third-round pick in the 2014 college draft. October 25, 2013: Seattle Reign FC sent forward Renae Cuéllar, the 23rd overall selection in the 2014 draft, and the rights to forward Jodie Taylor to Washington Spirit in exchange for the rights to defenders Alina Garciamendez and Nikki Marshall and the 17th overall pick in the 2014 Draft.)	Virginia
Round 3	27	(United States)	Annie Steinlage^{#}	D	Western New York Flash		Virginia
Round 4	28	(United States)	Jordan Jackson	M	Houston Dash		Nebraska
Round 4	29	(United States)	Shasta Fisher^{#}	D	Washington Spirit		Virginia
Round 4	30	(United States)	Ellen Parker^{#}	M	Seattle Reign FC		Portland
Round 4	31	(United States)	Elisabeth Sullivan	F	Portland Thorns FC	(Note: Chicago Red Stars → Seattle Reign FC → Washington Spirit → Portland Thorns. March 1, 2013: Seattle Reign FC sent their first-round selection in the 2014 draft plus future considerations to Chicago Red Stars in exchange for midfielder Keelin Winters and Chicago's 4th round pick. July 1, 2013: Seattle Reign FC sent Lindsay Taylor and a conditional fourth-round pick in the 2014 NWSL College Draft to Washington Spirit in exchange for the Spirit's 2014 College Draft second-round selection. January 17, 2014: Washington Spirit traded their 4th pick in the 4th round to Portland for Tiffany Weimer)	Mississippi State
Round 4	32	(United States)	Jami Kranich	G	Boston Breakers		Villanova
Round 4	33	(United States)	Elizabeth Eddy	M	Sky Blue FC		USC
Round 4	34	(United States)	Kim DeCesare	F	Boston Breakers	(Note: Portland Thorns FC → Boston Breakers. January 17, 2014: Portland traded their 7th pick in the 4th round and their 2nd round pick in the 2015 college draft to Boston for Michelle Betos.)	Duke
Round 4	35	(Canada)	Maegan Kelly	F	FC Kansas City		Marquette
Round 4	36	(United States)	Kristen Hamilton^{*}	F	Western New York Flash		Denver

=== Notable undrafted players ===
Below is a list of undrafted rookies who appeared in a competitive NWSL game in 2014.

Nat.	Player	Pos.	Original NWSL team	College	Notes
(United States)	Lindsay Elston	M	Houston Dash	Washington	
(Bosnia and Herzegovina)	DiDi Haračić	G	Western New York Flash	Loyola (MD)	
(United States)	Holly Hein	D	Houston Dash	Michigan	
(United States)	Sara Keane	G	FC Kansas City	West Virginia	
(United States)	Victoria McCombs	D	Houston Dash	Michigan	
(United States)	Kelly McFarlane	M	Houston Dash	North Carolina	
(United States)	Meg Morris	M	Sky Blue FC	North Carolina	
(United States)	Kecia Morway	D	Chicago Red Stars	Colorado College	
(United States)	Courtney Niemiec	D	Portland Thorns FC	La Salle	
(United States)	Haley Palmer	D	Western New York Flash	San Diego State	
(United States)	Kelsey Pardue	M	Washington Spirit	Longwood	
(United States)	Domi Richardson	D	Houston Dash	Missouri	
(Mexico)	Bianca Sierra	D	Washington Spirit	Auburn	
(United States)	Jennifer Skogerboe	D	Washington Spirit	UConn	
(United States)	Nikki Stanton	M	Sky Blue FC	Fairfield	
(Sweden)	Hanna Terry	F	Portland Thorns FC	Northeastern	

== Trades ==
Round 1:

Round 2:

Round 3:

Round 4:

== Summary ==
In 2014, a total of 27 colleges had players selected. Of these, 15 had a player drafted to the NWSL for the first time: Denver, Duke, Georgetown, Illinois, Marquette, Mississippi State, Nebraska, Notre Dame, Ole Miss, Santa Clara, Texas Tech, USC, Villanova, Virginia Tech and West Virginia.

=== Schools with multiple draft selections ===
Selections	Schools
3	Duke, North Carolina, Virginia
2	Florida State, Portland, Santa Clara

=== Selections by college athletic conference ===
Conference	Round 1	Round 2	Round 3	Round 4	Total
ACC	3	3	5	2	13
Big East	0	0	1	1	2
Big Ten	3	0	1	1	5
Big 12	0	1	1	0	2
Colonial	0	0	0	1	1
Pac-12	1	1	0	1	3
SEC	0	1	0	1	2
Summit	0	0	0	1	1
The American	0	1	0	0	1
West Coast	2	2	1	1	6

=== Selections by position ===
Position	Round 1	Round 2	Round 3	Round 4	Total
Goalkeeper	0	1	0	1	2
Defender	3	4	3	1	11
Midfielder	1	2	3	3	9
Forward	5	2	3	4	14

== See also ==
- List of NWSL drafts
- List of National Women's Soccer League draftees by college team
- 2014 National Women's Soccer League season
