= CIPO =

CIPO may refer to:

- Canadian Intellectual Property Office
- Capital Improvement Program Office ("CIPO"), construction management software
- Chief Innovation and Product Officer
- Chronic intestinal pseudo-obstruction
- Mario Cipollini ("Cipo"), Italian retired professional cyclist
- Popular Indigenous Council of Oaxaca "Ricardo Flores Magon", or CIPO-RFM, an organization of indigenous communities in Oaxaca state, Mexico

== See also ==
- Cipó, a municipality in Brazil
