= Darcy McFarlane =

American soccer player

Personal information
- Full name: Darcy Craig McFarlane
- Date of birth: March 15, 1995 (age 31)
- Place of birth: Mill Valley, California, United States
- Height: 5 ft 6 in (1.68 m)
- Position: Midfielder

College career
Years	Team	Apps	(Gls)
2013–2016	North Carolina Tar Heels	62	(0)

Senior career*
Years	Team	Apps	(Gls)
2017	Celtic		
2017	Östersunds DFF		
- * Club domestic league appearances and goals

Darcy McFarlane is an American women's soccer player.

== Biography ==
Darcy McFarlane helped the Tar Heels reach the 2016 College Cup before losing to West Virginia.

After from graduating UNC, McFarlane was signed by Scottish team Celtic FC alongside Jaclyn Poucel. On Sunday, March 20, 2017, McFarlane made her debut against Glasgow City F.C. winning Player of the Match. In 2017 Darcy McFarlane signed for Östersunds DFF.

== Personal life ==
Darcy McFarlane is of Scottish and Irish descent. Her sister Kelly McFarlane also played professional soccer.

== Honors ==
- Scottish Premier League Cup
  - Runners-up: 2017
