= 2017 Scottish Women's Premier League Cup =

Tournament details
- Country: Scotland
- Teams: 16

Final positions
- Champions: Hibernian
- Runners-up: Celtic

Tournament statistics
- Matches played: 15
- Goals scored: 74 (4.93 per match)
- All statistics correct as of 16 October 2022.

The 2017 Scottish Women's Premier League Cup was the 16th edition of the SWPL Cup competition, which began in 2002. The competition was to be contested by all 16 teams of the two divisions of the Scottish Women's Premier League (SWPL 1 and SWPL 2).

== First round ==
draw for the first round was made on 10 February 2017.

19 February 2017	East Fife	0–6	Hibernian	Leven
13:00			Harrison 15'; Cornet; Robertson; Conner (o.g.); McLaughlin	Stadium: King George V Park

19 February 2017	Celtic	1–0	Forfar Farmington	East Kilbride
13:00	Ross 19'			Stadium: K-Park Training Academy

19 February 2017	Heart of Midlothian	3–0	Hamilton Academical	Dalkeith
14:00	Carse; Dodds >			Stadium: King’s Park

19 February 2017	Rangers	8–3	Hutchison Vale	Glasgow
14:00	McLintock; Brown		Goal	Stadium: New Tinto Park

19 February 2017	Stirling University	7–1	Buchan	Stirling
15:00	Goal		Goal	Stadium: Gannochy Sports Centre

19 February 2017	St Johnstone	0–8	Glasgow City	Perth
16:00			Jordan; Grant; McCarthy; Doherty; Kerr	Stadium: McDiarmid Park

19 February 2017	Motherwell	3–4	Spartans	Motherwell
16:0	Goal		McMahon; Gavin; Marshall; B. Beveridge	Stadium: Ravenscraig Regional Sports Facility

26 February 2017	Aberdeen	3–4	Glasgow Women	Aberdeen
13:00	Goal			Stadium: Kaimhill Garthdee

== Quarter-finals ==
26 March 2017	Glasgow City	2–0	Stirling University	Airdrie
13:00	Murray; Lauder			Stadium: Excelsior Stadium

26 March 2017	Spartans	4–1	Aberdeen	Edinburgh
13:00	Goal		Goal	Stadium: Ainslie Park

26 March 2017	Celtic	4–1	Heart of Midlothian	East Kilbride
14:00	Goal		Goal	Stadium: K-Park Training Academy

26 March 2017	Hibernian	5–0	Rangers	Edinburgh
16:00	Goal			Stadium: Ainslie Park

== Semi-finals ==
The draw for the semi-finals was held on 29 March 2017 at Hampden Park

30 April 2017	Celtic	2–1	Spartans	Edinburgh
12:00	Howat; Mulvey		Cavanagh	Stadium: Ainslie Park

30 April 2019	Hibernian	1–0 (a.e.t.)	Glasgow City	Edinburgh
15:00	Harrison			Stadium: Ainslie Park

== Final ==
The final was played on Sunday 26 May 2017 at the Broadwood Stadium, Cumbernauld. Hibernian won 4–1 against Celtic. It was their second SWPL Cup win in a row and their fifth overall.

21 May 2017
16:05

Celtic	1–4	Hibernian
Littlejohn 6'		Smith 5'; Graham 34'; McLaughlan 48'; Small 79'

Broadwood Stadium, Cumbernauld

Celtic	Hibernian

(Scotland) Megan Cunningham
(Scotland) Courtney Whyte
(Scotland) Kelly Clark (c)
(United States) Darcy McFarlane (substituted off) 75'
(Scotland) Natalie Ross
(Scotland) Sarah Crilly (substituted off) 75'
(United States) Jaclyn Poucel (substituted off) 64'
(Northern Ireland) Kerry Montgomery
(Republic of Ireland) Ruesha Littlejohn
(Scotland) Jamie-Lee Napier
(Scotland) Suzanne Mulvey (substituted off) 70'
Substitutes:
(Scotland) Kiera Gibson
(Scotland) Mairead Fulton (substituted on) 75'
(Scotland) Georgie Rafferty
(Scotland) Ellis Dalgleish
(Scotland) Heather Richards (substituted on) 64'
(Scotland) Kirsty Howat (substituted on) 75'
(Scotland) Sarah Ewens (substituted on) 70'
Manager:
(Scotland) David Haley

(Scotland) Jenna Fife
(Scotland) Cailin Michie (substituted off) 90'
(Scotland) Emma Brownlie
(Scotland) Siobhan Hunter
(Scotland) Kirsty Smith
(Scotland) Rachel McLauchlan
(Scotland) Abi Harrison (substituted off) 89'
(Scotland) Lucy Graham
(Scotland) Rachael Small (c)
(Scotland) Chelsea Cornet (substituted off) 77'
(Scotland) Katey Turner (substituted off) 64'
Substitutes:
(Scotland) Hannah Reid
(Scotland) Lisa Robertson
(Scotland) Joelle Murray (substituted on) 89'
(Scotland) Shannon Leishman (substituted on) 90'
(Scotland) Amy Gallacher (substituted on) 77'
(Scotland) Lia Tweedie (substituted on) 64'
Manager:
(Scotland) Chris Roberts
