= Rafaelle Souza =

Brazilian footballer (born 1991)

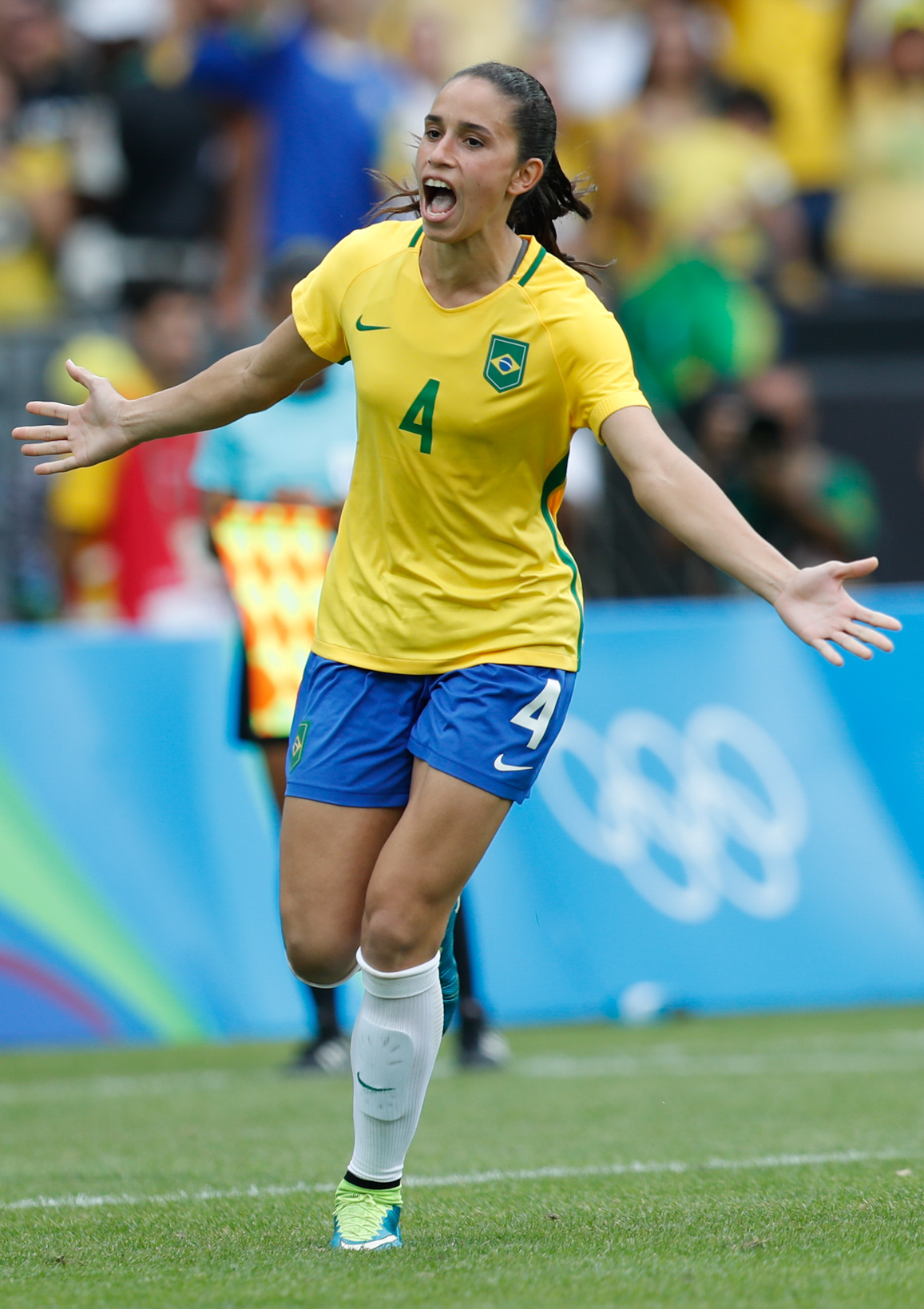
- Souza at the 2016 Summer Olympics

Personal information
- Full name: Rafaelle Leone Carvalho Souza
- Date of birth: 18 June 1991 (age 35)
- Place of birth: Cipó, Bahia, Brazil
- Height: 1.76 m (5 ft 9 in)
- Position: Centre-back

College career
| Years | Team | Apps | (Gls) |
| 2011–2013 | Ole Miss Rebels | 61 | (44) |

Senior career*
| Years | Team | Apps | (Gls) |
| 2014 | Houston Dash | 16 | (0) |
| 2014 | Sao Francisco BA | 1 | (3) |
| 2015 | America Miniero | 6 | (4) |
| 2016–2021 | Changchun Zhuoyue | | |
| 2021–2022 | Palmeiras | 9 | (0) |
| 2022–2023 | Arsenal | 22 | (3) |
| 2023–2026 | Orlando Pride | 49 | (1) |

International career^{‡}
| 2012– | Brazil | 84 | (9) |
Medal record
Women's football
Representing Brazil
Olympic Games
| Silver medal – second place | 2024 Paris |
Pan American Games
| Winner | 2015 Toronto | Team |
- * Club domestic league appearances and goals as of 03:29, 8 November 2026 (UTC) ‡ National team caps and goals as of 4 June 2024

Rafaelle Leone Carvalho Souza (/hɑːfɑːˈɛli/ hah-fah-ELL-ee; born 18 June 1991) is a Brazilian professional footballer who plays as a centre-back for the Brazil national team. She has previously played for the University of Mississippi during her college soccer career in the United States and has played professionally for Houston Dash, Sao Francisco, America Miniero, Changchun Zhuoyue, Palmeiras, Arsenal, and the Orlando Pride.

== Club career ==
In January 2014, Souza was picked in the second round of the 2014 NWSL College Draft by expansion team Houston Dash. After playing one season, she was waived by Houston Dash, but FC Kansas City acquired her rights the following week. In March 2015, Kansas City announced that Souza would not play in the 2015 National Women's Soccer League season as she was in training with her national team Brazil.

Souza signed with Changchun Zhuoyue of the Chinese Women's Super League in 2016, one of three Brazilian players to do so with Raquel and Darlene. Terms of the deals were not released, but in an interview with Globo Esporte, Souza said the pay was considerably more than she could make in Brazil. In 2017, fellow Brazilian national team player Cristiane would join her at Changchun Zhuoyue.

In 2022, Souza joined Arsenal on a free transfer from Changchun Zhuoyue. She was the first Brazilian to play for Arsenal W.F.C.

On 3 July 2023, it was announced that Souza had signed a two-and-a-half-year contract with Orlando Pride of the National Women's Soccer League, joining the team following the conclusion of the 2023 FIFA Women's World Cup. In January 2024, Souza acquired a U.S. green card meaning she would no longer occupy an international roster spot. On 24 October 2026, the Pride announced Souza's departure from Orlando and retirement from the NWSL.

== International career ==
Souza played for Brazil's youth teams at the inaugural 2008 FIFA U-17 Women's World Cup in New Zealand and the 2010 FIFA U-20 Women's World Cup held in Germany. Her senior debut came in December 2011 as a substitute in a 4–0 win over Chile at the 2011 Torneio Internacional Cidade de São Paulo de Futebol Feminino. She started her first match for Brazil's senior team in March 2012, against Canada.

In February 2015, Souza was included in an 18-month residency programme intended to prepare Brazil's national team for the 2015 FIFA Women's World Cup in Canada and the 2016 Rio Olympics.

At the 2015 FIFA Women's World Cup, Souza formed a makeshift center-back partnership with Mônica. They kept clean sheets in all three matches as Brazil qualified from their group without conceding a goal. In the second-round match against Australia, Brazil exited the competition after losing 1–0. Rafaelle remained in Canada as part of the Brazilian selection for the 2015 Pan American Games in Toronto.

Souza captained the Brazilian team to their 4th consecutive win in the 2022 Copa America Feminina.

In June 2023, it was announced that she would captain Brazil in the FIFA Women's World Cup in Australia and New Zealand.

On 1 February 2024, Souza was called up to the Brazil squad for the 2024 CONCACAF W Gold Cup. On 2 July 2024, Souza was called up to the Brazil squad for the 2024 Summer Olympics.

== Personal life ==
On October 4, 2026, Souza married American professional footballer Hailie Mace.

== Career statistics ==
=== International ===
Scores and results list Brazil's goal tally first, score column indicates score after each Rafaelle Souza goal.

List of international goals scored by Rafaelle Souza
| No. | Date | Venue | Opponent | Score | Result | Competition | Ref. |
|---|---|---|---|---|---|---|---|
| 1 | July 22, 2015 | Toronto, Canada | Mexico | 2–1 | 4–2 | 2015 Pan American Games | |
| 2 | July 22, 2015 | Toronto, Canada | Mexico | 4–2 | 4–2 | 2015 Pan American Games | |
| 3 | June 10, 2017 | Fuenlabrada, Spain | Spain | 2–1 | 2–1 | Friendly | |
| 4 | November 25, 2017 | Ovalle, Chile | Chile | 2–0 | 4–0 | Friendly | |
| 5 | April 7, 2018 | Coquimbo, Chile | Ecuador | 5–0 | 8–0 | 2018 Copa América Femenina | |
| 6 | November 27, 2020 | São Paulo, Brazil | Ecuador | 4–0 | 6–0 | Friendly | |
| 7 | December 1, 2020 | São Paulo, Brazil | Ecuador | 4–0 | 8–0 | Friendly | |
| 8 | December 1, 2020 | São Paulo, Brazil | Ecuador | 5–0 | 8–0 | Friendly | |
| 9 | February 27, 2024 | San Diego, United States | Panama | 3–0 | 5–0 | 2024 CONCACAF W Gold Cup | |

== Honours ==
Palmeiras

- Copa Paulista Women: 2021

Arsenal

- FA Women's League Cup: 2022–23

Orlando Pride

- NWSL Shield: 2024
- NWSL Championship: 2024

Brazil

- Copa América Femenina: 2018, 2022
- Pan American Games: 2015
- SheBelieves Cup runner-up: 2021
- Summer Olympics silver medal: 2024

Individual

- PFA Team of the Year: 2022–23 FA WSL
- Arsenal Player of the Month: February 2023
- CONCACAF W Gold Cup Best XI: 2024

== See also ==
- List of women's footballers with 100 or more international caps
