= Jaclyn Poucel =

American soccer player (born 1993)

Personal information
- Date of birth: September 18, 1993 (age 33)
- Place of birth: Lancaster, Pennsylvania, United States
- Height: 1.76 m (5 ft 9 in)
- Position: Defender

College career
Years	Team	Apps	(Gls)
2011–2014	Pittsburgh Panthers	64	(0)

Jaclyn Poucel Árnason (née Poucel; born September 18, 1993) is a former American women's soccer player who played Celtic F.C. Women.

== Honors ==
- Scottish Premier League Cup
  - Runners-up: 2017
