= Haley Palmer =

American soccer player (born 1992)

Personal information
- Full name: Haley Aiko Palmer
- Date of birth: October 19, 1992 (age 34)
- Place of birth: Windsor, California, United States
- Height: 5 ft 9 in (1.75 m)
- Position: Defender

Youth career
- Santa Rosa United

College career
Years	Team	Apps	(Gls)
2010–2013	San Diego State Aztecs	87	(3)

Senior career*
Years	Team	Apps	(Gls)
2014	Western New York Flash	7	(0)
2015	Vasa IFK	6	(8)
- * Club domestic league appearances and goals

Haley Aiko Palmer (born October 19, 1992) is an American retired soccer player who played for defender.

== Early life and education ==
Palmer was born in Windsor, California on October 19, 1992. She attended Windsor High School, where she received various accolades as a student-athlete. In addition to playing soccer on her school team, she competed with Santa Rosa United, gaining her the titles of 2005 U.S. national champion and 2006 State Cup finalist.

Palmer studied communications at San Diego State University.

== Club career ==
Palmer played with San Diego State University's women's soccer team from 2010 to 2013. While there, was a three-time All-Conference selection and was named Defensive Player of the Year twice.

In February 2014, Palmer attended an open tryout with the National Women's Soccer League and was later invited to a second tryout. She signed with the Western New York Flash later that year.

For the 2015–16 season, she played with Vasa IFK.
