= Jordan Jackson (soccer) =

American soccer player (born 1990)

Personal information
- Full name: Jordan Alexa Jackson
- Date of birth: September 19, 1990 (age 36)
- Place of birth: Westerville, Ohio, U.S.
- Height: 5 ft 7 in (1.70 m)
- Position: Midfielder

Youth career
- KCFC Alliance Jazz

College career
Years	Team	Apps	(Gls)
2009–2013	Nebraska Cornhuskers	85	(35)

Senior career*
Years	Team	Apps	(Gls)
2014–2015	Houston Dash	29	(2)
- * Club domestic league appearances and goals

Jordan Alexa Jackson (born September 19, 1990) is an American soccer player from Overland Park, Kansas. She last played for Houston Dash of the National Women's Soccer League in 2015.

== Early life ==
Jackson was born on September 19, 1990, in Overland Park, Kansas.

Jackson played high school soccer at Blue Valley West High School, where she was a four-year starter and a high school All-American her senior year. Jackson played club soccer for the KCFC Alliance Jazz.

=== Collegiate career ===
Jackson attended the University of Nebraska–Lincoln where she played as a forward and midfielder for the Cornhuskers. Jackson scored 35 goals and had 31 assists in 85 appearances for the Cornhuskers.

== Club career ==
Jackson was selected in the fourth round of the National Women's Soccer League college entry draft by the Houston Dash.

Jackson scored her first professional goal against FC Kansas City

She was waived by the Houston Dash in October 2015.

== International career ==
Jackson has appeared with the United States national U-20 soccer team and was part of the United States U-23 women's national team player pool.

== Career statistics ==
Club	Season	League			Playoffs (Note: Includes NWSL Playoffs)		Total	
Club	Season	Division	Apps	Goals	Apps	Goals	Apps	Goals
Houston Dash	2014	NWSL	20	2	—		20	2
Houston Dash	2015	NWSL	9	0	—		9	0
Career total			29	2	0	0	29	2

== Awards and honors ==
Individual

- Big Ten Midfielder of the Year: 2013
- First Team All-Big Ten: 2013
- Second Team NSCAA All-Great Lakes Region: 2013
- Big Ten All-Tournament Team: 2013
- First Team All-Big 12: 2010
