= Bianca Henninger =

American-born Mexican footballer (born 1990)

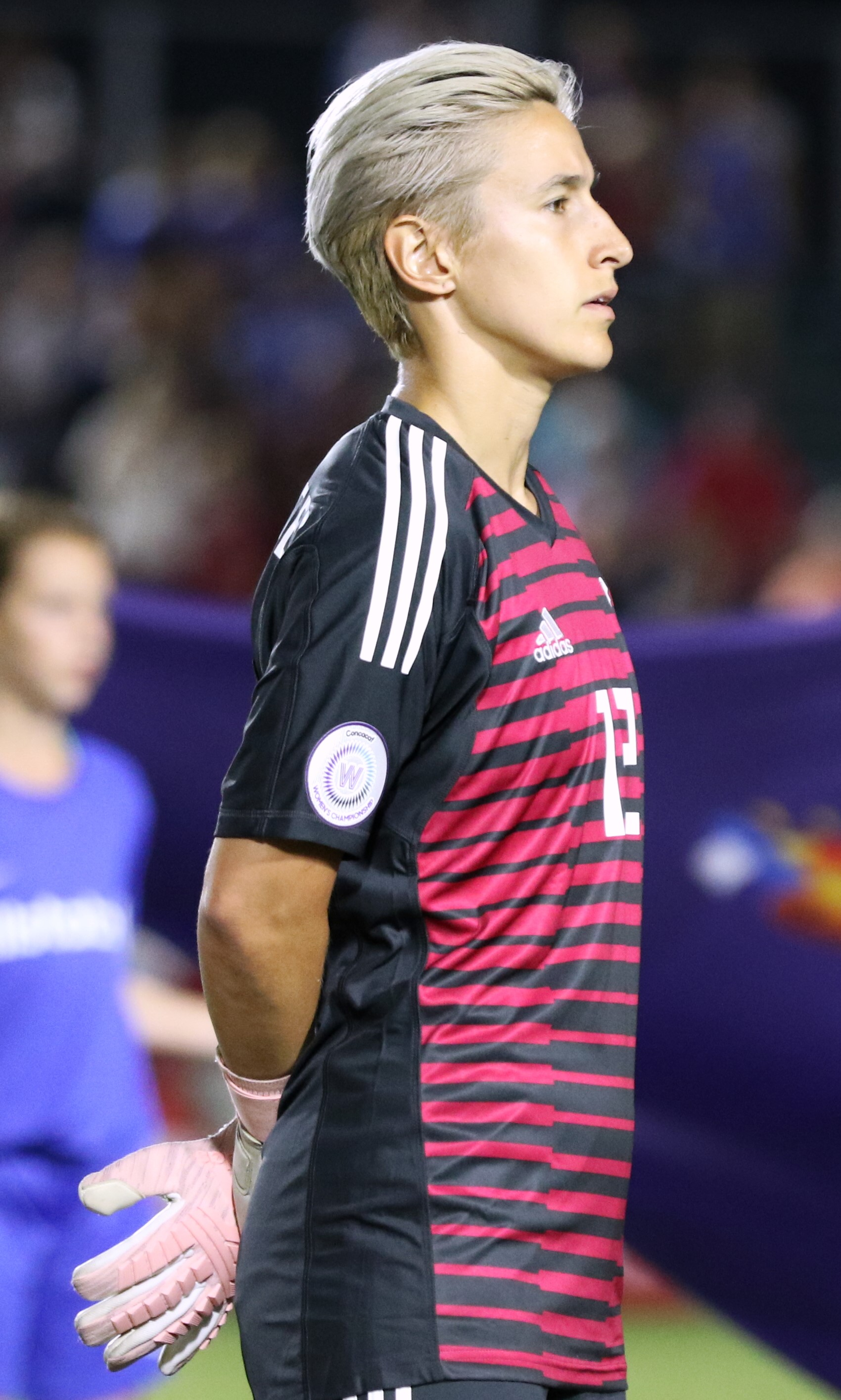
- Bianca Henninger playing for Mexico on October 4, 2018.

Personal information
- Full name: Bianca Henninger Moreno
- Date of birth: 22 October 1990 (age 36)
- Place of birth: San Jose, California, United States
- Height: 5 ft 6 in (1.68 m)
- Position: Goalkeeper

College career
Years	Team	Apps	(Gls)
2008–2011	Santa Clara Broncos		

Senior career*
Years	Team	Apps	(Gls)
2012	New York Fury		
2013	FC Kansas City	2	(0)
2013	→ Bayern Munich (loan)	0	(0)
2014–2019	Houston Dash	20	(0)
2016–2017	→ Melbourne Victory (loan)	7	(0)

International career^{‡}
2009–2010	United States U-20		
2011	United States U-23		
2017–2019	Mexico	7	(0)
- * Club domestic league appearances and goals as of 26 January 2020 ‡ National team caps and goals as of 26 January 2020

Bianca Henninger Moreno (born 22 October 1990) is an American-born Mexican former professional footballer who last played as a goalkeeper for the Houston Dash and the Mexico women's national football team.

== Early life ==
Henninger attended Archbishop Mitty High School in San Jose, California where she was an NSCAA All-American in 2006 and 2007. She was named a Parade Magazine All-American in 2007 and 2008. Henninger played U-13 to U-18 for the De Anza Strykers, a four-time state cup finalist. She played U- 6 through U-11 with the Central Valley Mercury.

=== Santa Clara University ===
Henninger attended Santa Clara University. As a freshman in 2008, she played in seven matches for the Broncos, starting three. As a sophomore in 2009, she started 17 of 19 matches and earned six shutouts. She had one assist on a long punt. Henninger suffered a concussion in the first West Coast Conference game of the year and missed four conference games. She earned her first career NCAA Tournament shutout in a 1–0 victory over Michigan State in the first round. During the second round of the NCAA tournament in a match against Oklahoma State, she saved two penalty kicks and scored one in a 6–5 shootout victory. She started 21 games as a junior and 18 games as a senior and was 1st team all-WCC both years.

== Club career ==
=== Philadelphia Independence ===
Henninger was selected by the Philadelphia Independence in the third round (14th overall) of the 2012 WPS Draft.

=== New York Fury ===
After the WPS folded in early 2012, Henninger signed with the New York Fury in the WPSL Elite.

=== FC Kansas City ===
On 7 February 2013, Henninger was drafted by FC Kansas City for the inaugural season of the National Women's Soccer League.

=== Houston Dash ===
On 13 January 2014, Henninger was traded to the Houston Dash in exchange for the first pick of the third round (19th overall) in the 2014 NWSL College Draft.

Henninger was named Player of the Week for week 7 of the 2015 NWSL season after recording eight saves in a 1–0 Houston win over Portland.

On January 26, 2020, Henninger announced her retirement from professional soccer.

==== Loan to Melbourne Victory ====
In October 2016, Henninger was loaned to Melbourne Victory for the 2016–17 W-League season.

== International career ==
Born in the United States, Henninger was a member of the 2010 FIFA U-20 Women's World Cup U.S. squad that was eliminated in the quarterfinals. She played in all four games and allowed only two goals. She also played in all 5 games for the gold medal-winning U.S. team in the 2010 Concacaf U20 World Cup qualifying tournament in Guatemala, during which she surrendered 2 goals. She played for various U.S. youth teams before 2010, and the U-23's in 2011 and 2012. She attended training camp with the full national team in 2011.

Henninger did not play in any senior-level games with the U.S. team, leaving her eligibility open to play with the Mexico women's national football team, as her mother was born in Mexico. In November 2015, Henninger began training with the Mexico national team. She was called up by the Mexico team in 2016 for the Four Nations Tournament in China. She made her senior debut for Mexico on 4 February 2017 in a 3–2 friendly loss against Canada. Henninger has 4 caps with the national team, sharing goalkeeping duties with teammate Cecilia Santiago.

== Honors and awards ==
Henninger received the adidas Golden Glove award while representing the United States with the United States U-20 women's national soccer team at the 2010 FIFA U-20 Women's World Cup in Germany.

Henninger received the US Soccer Young Female Athlete of the Year award in 2010. NSCAA/Performance Subaru First-Team All-American in 2010 and Third-Team in 2011. Henninger was WCC 1st team All Conference in 2010 and in 2011 was WCC 1st team All Conference in addition to being the conference Goalkeeper of the Year.

== Personal life ==
Henninger is openly lesbian. She owns a dog called Rafa.
