= Tiffany McCarty =

American soccer player (born 1990)

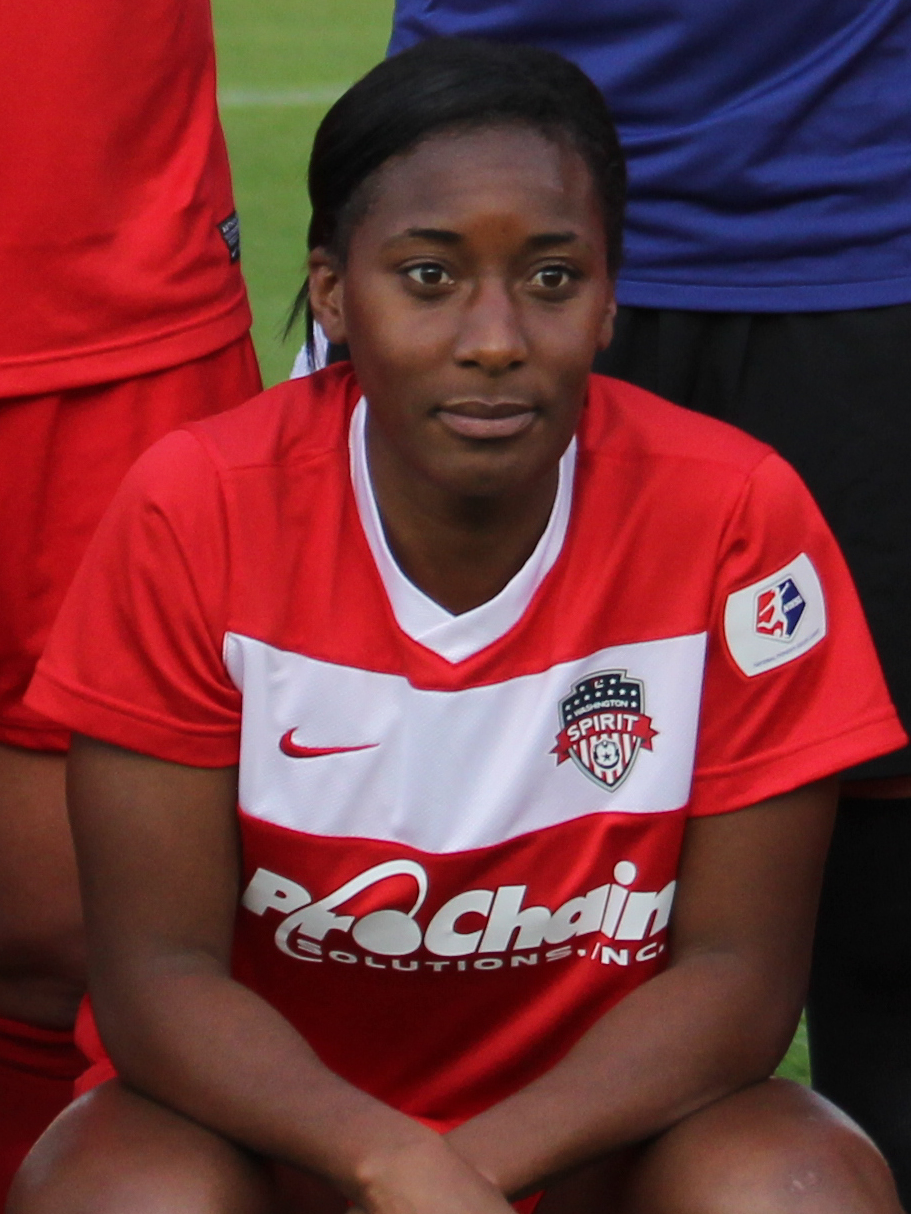
- McCarty playing for Washington Spirit, 2013

Personal information
- Full name: Tifanny Janea McCarty
- Date of birth: December 14, 1990 (age 35)
- Place of birth: Laurel, Maryland, U.S.
- Height: 5 ft 4 in (1.63 m)
- Position: Forward

Team information
- Current team: Þór/KA
- Number: 16

College career
Years	Team	Apps	(Gls)
2008–2012	Florida State Seminoles	98	(63)

Senior career*
Years	Team	Apps	(Gls)
2007–2009	Washington Freedom		
2011	Pali Blues		
2013	Washington Spirit	21	(2)
2013	→ Albirex Niigata Ladies (loan)		
2014–2015	Houston Dash	37	(5)
2016	FC Kansas City	16	(2)
2017–2018	Medkila IL	8	(0)
2018–2019	Washington Spirit	2	(1)
2020	Selfoss	16	(9)
2021	Breiðablik	17	(8)
2022	Þór/KA	14	(3)

International career
2007	United States U17		
2009–2010	United States U20		
2013	United States U23		
- * Club domestic league appearances and goals as of 20 July 2020

Tifanny Janea McCarty (born December 14, 1990) is an American soccer forward who last played for Þór/KA in the Úrvalsdeild kvenna. She previously played for the Houston Dash, and FC Kansas City, and Washington Spirit in the NWSL as well as Albirex Niigata Ladies in Japan's Nadeshiko League and Medkila IL in Norway.

== Early life ==
McCarty attended St. John's College High School, where she finished her high school career as the all-time leading scorer in goals (191) and assists (74). Her 191 goals broke the Washington Metro area (including Washington D.C., Maryland and Virginia) scoring record. She led the WCAC Conference in scoring for four straight years while guiding St. Johns to two WCAC Conference Championships. In 2008, she was named a PARADE All-American. She was a three-time NSCAA/adidas High School All-American and a two-time NSCAA/adidas Youth All-American. She was named NSCAA/adidas South Regional All-American (2005–07) and State Player of the Year in the District of Columbia from 2005 to 2007. She was named Gatorade Player of the Year in the District of Columbia from 2005 to 2007. McCarty was named a top 25 recruit by Soccer Buzz and was a member of the Maryland state Olympic Development Program (ODP) squad from 2002 to 2007. She was also a member of the Region I Regional Team from 2003 to 2007. McCarty captained the ODP Regional championship team in 2005 and helped the Maryland squad to the 2006 ODP national championship.

McCarty also played with the club team, Freestate Shooters. In 2004, she helped the team win the 2004 Maryland state cup championship. In 2007, as captain of the team, she led the team to the 2007 Region I Premier League championship and the 2007 US Club Soccer national championship.

=== Florida State Seminoles, 2008–2012 ===
McCarty attended Florida State University, where she played for the Seminoles for four years, making 98 appearances, scoring 63 goals and providing 24 assists. She was a semifinalist for the MAC Hermann Trophy in 2009 and 2011.

== Club career ==
=== Washington Freedom, 2007–2009 ===
McCarty was striker for the Washington Freedom of the W-League for three seasons in 2007, 2008 and 2009 capturing the league championship in 2007. She scored a goal in the championship match against the Atlanta Silverbacks and earned W-League Team of the Week Honorable Mention honors in 2009.

=== Pali Blues, 2011 ===
McCarty played for the Pali Blues of the W-League during the summer of 2011.

=== Washington Spirit, 2013 ===
McCarty was selected in the first round (second overall) of the 2013 NWSL College Draft by the Washington Spirit for the inaugural season of the National Women's Soccer League. During the team's first regular season match against the Boston Breakers, she scored the team's lone goal.

==== Loan to Albirex Niigata, 2013 ====
On September 25, 2013, Tiffany McCarty was loaned out to Nadeshiko League club Albirex Niigata Ladies in Japan.

=== Houston Dash, 2014–2015 ===
On January 10, 2014, the Houston Dash selected McCarty with the second pick in the 2014 NWSL Expansion Draft.

=== FC Kansas City, 2016 ===
On January 13, 2016, McCarty was traded to FC Kansas City along with Jessica McDonald for the 8th overall pick in the 2016 NWSL College Draft. McCarty would choose not to play for FC Kansas City in the 2017 season, opting to play in Norway instead.

=== Medkila IL, 2017–2018 ===
McCarty signed with Medkila IL in the Toppserien. The Team was relegated following a 12th-place finish in the 2017 season.

=== Washington Spirit, 2018 ===
On August 30, 2018, McCarty was signed as a National Team Replacement Player by the Washington Spirit for their final game of the 2018 NWSL Season and ended up playing 70 minutes in that September 2 match. McCarty was named to Washington's roster ahead of the 2019 NWSL season.

=== Iceland ===
McCarty played with Selfoss in the summer of 2020, scoring 9 goals in 16 Úrvalsdeild games, and with Breiðablik in 2021 where she netted 8 goals in 17 games. McCarty won the Icelandic Cup with Breiðablik and scored in the cup final. In January 2022, she signed with Þór/KA where she netted 3 goals in 14 matches.

== International career ==
McCarty has represented the United States at various youth levels, including Under-17s, Under-18s Under-20s. In 2013, she was a member of the United States under-23 women's national soccer team that won the Four Nations Tournament in La Manga Club, Spain.

== Awards ==
- NWSL Goal of the Week: Week 20, 2019
