= Dominique Richardson =

Bermudian footballer

Personal information
- Full name: Dominique Richardson
- Date of birth: 6 September 1992 (age 34)
- Place of birth: Bermuda
- Position: Midfielder

College career
| Years | Team | Apps | (Gls) |
| 2012–2013 | Barry | 32 | (4) |

International career^{‡}
| 2011– | Bermuda | 2 | (0) |
- ‡ National team caps and goals as of 22:33, 19 March 2015 (UTC)

Dominique Richardson (born 6 September 1992), is a Bermudian footballer who plays as a midfielder.

== College ==
In 2010, Richardson enrolled at the Barry University to play for their Division II NAIA program. In her first year she redshirted, not participating in a team a year later. She played her first match on 24 August 2012, against Webber.

== Personal life ==
She joined Insurance group Ace's professional lines department on a two-year graduate training programme in August 2015.

== See also ==
- List of Bermuda women's international footballers
