= Kelly McFarlane =

Former soccer player

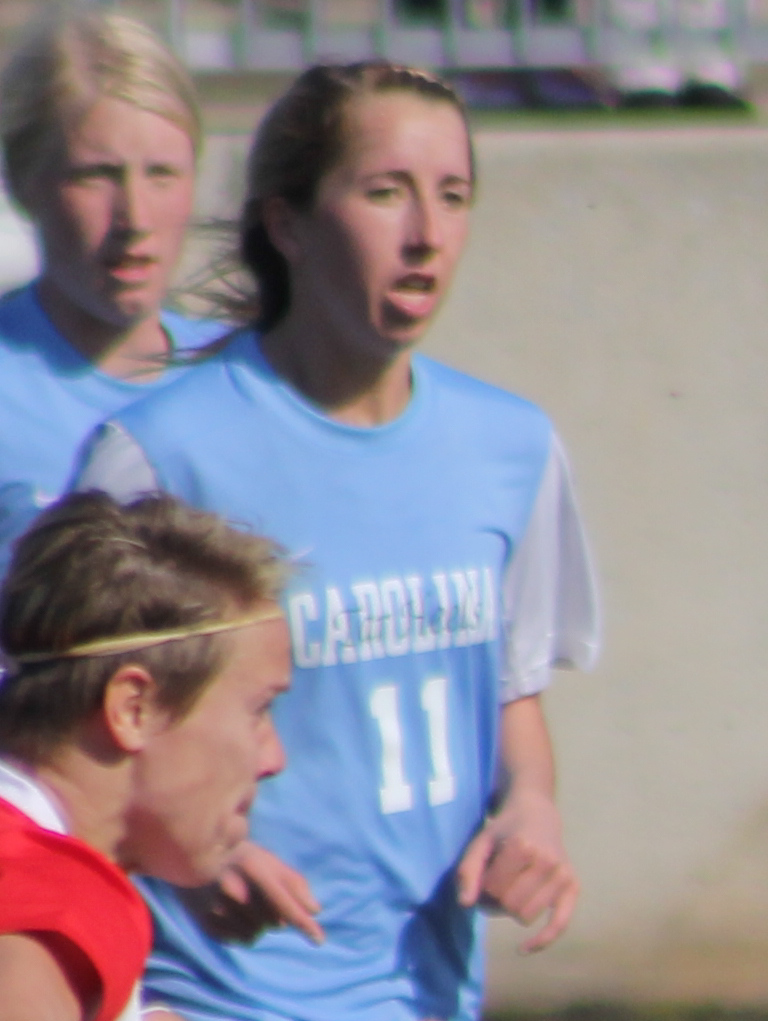
- McFarlane in 2013 playing for the North Carolina Tar Heels women's soccer team

Personal information
- Full name: Kelly Heavner McFarlane
- Date of birth: October 2, 1992 (age 34)
- Place of birth: Mill Valley, California, United States
- Height: 5 ft 0 in (1.52 m)
- Position: Defensive midfielder

College career
Years	Team	Apps	(Gls)
2010–2013	North Carolina Tar Heels	92	(5)

Senior career*
Years	Team	Apps	(Gls)
2014	Houston Dash	13	(0)
- * Club domestic league appearances and goals

Kelly Heavner McFarlane (born October 2, 1992) is an American former soccer player who last played as a defensive midfielder for Houston Dash in the National Women's Soccer League.

== Career ==
=== Club ===
McFarlane played college soccer for the University of North Carolina at Chapel Hill, where she appeared in 92 games, scoring five goals and tallying 14 assists. She played all the matches during the Tar Heels national championship season in 2012. McFarlane was included twice in the All-ACC Academic Team.

During the 2014 National Women's Soccer League pre-season, McFarlane spent time with Houston Dash as a trialist. On May 14, 2014, she signed with the club. McFarlane spent the entire 2014 season with the club, playing 13 matches for them. Following the season completion, she was waived.

== Personal life ==
After her professional soccer career, McFarlane pursued an academic and medical career being awarded a Knight-Hennessy Scholarship in 2019.

Her sister Darcy McFarlane also played professional soccer.
