= Popular Indigenous Council of Oaxaca "Ricardo Flores Magón" =

The Popular Indigenous Council of Oaxaca "Ricardo Flores Magón" (Spanish: Consejo Indígena Popular de Oaxaca "Ricardo Flores Magón"), also known by its acronym CIPO-RFM, is an organization drawn from rural Indigenous peoples and communities in the Mexican state of Oaxaca. The organization states that its goals (among others) are to "promote, diffuse and defend our human, territorial, economic, social, political and cultural rights, as communities and as individuals", which are to be accomplished through non-violent community-based action. Decisions within the organization are made through assemblies in which the participants work towards reaching a consensus. Their namesake and inspiration is the late early 20th century Mexican anarchist Ricardo Flores Magón, upon whose legacy and principles the organization is based. The CIPO advocates autonomous communities, ending private property, and common ownership of land.

== Community Organizing ==
The CIPO-RFM has organised around twenty-six rural communities into small anarchist communities where common ownership and participatory democracy are practiced. If a village expresses interest in the group a delegate from the CIPO-RFM comes to the village and explains how they work before it is put to a vote. In an effort to protect the local environment, the CIPO-RFM has engaged in the sabotage and direct action against wind farms, shrimp farms, eucalyptus plantations and the timber industry. They have also set up corn and coffee worker cooperatives and built schools and hospitals to help the local populations. They have also created a network of autonomous community radio stations to educate people about dangers to the environment and inform the surrounding communities about new industrial projects that would destroy more land. In 2001, the CIPO-RFM defeated the construction of a highway that was part of Plan Puebla Panama. During the Zapatista rebellion of 1994, they shut down transportation lines to slow down the movement of troops, and they also blocked highways and shut down government offices to support the 2006 rebellion throughout Oaxaca.

== Harassment ==
Since its inception in the 1980s the CIPO-RFM has reported experiencing varying levels of harassment and persecution by officials within Oaxaca government and by paramilitaries they suspect of being associated with the Oaxacan state government. Members of CIPO-RFM have by their own account faced public defamation, ransacked homes and threats of death. Several high-profile members of CIPO-RFM now live abroad as political refugees, after having to flee Mexico due to persecution, including death threats and assassination attempts against them. Exiles include Raúl Gatica, one of the original founding members of CIPO-RFM. Gatica fled Mexico following persecution, including threats upon his life, and has been living in Canada since 2005. The Mexican government has also tried to deny resources to CIPO-RFM communities in the hope of starving them out.

== Current status ==
As of September 2006 the membership of CIPO-RFM involves representation from 26 different, mainly Indigenous, communities including Chatino, Mixtec, Chinantec, Cuicatec, Zapotec, Mixe, and Trique peoples, and membership numbers total approximately 2000 activists. Though most of the membership of CIPO-RFM is of Indigenous origin the organization is also open to non-Indigenous people, both from Mexico and abroad, and is supportive of broader grassroots progressive social movements and struggles throughout the world. The ideas of Ricardo Flores Magon have found followers among Indigenous leaders, such as Tomas Cruz Lorenzo, a Chatino leader.

== See also ==
- Magonism
- Anarchism
- Green Anarchism
- Anarchism in Mexico
- 2006 Oaxaca Protests
- Rebel Autonomous Zapatista Municipalities
- Libertarian Socialism
- Zaachila
