= Kika Toulouse =

American soccer player (born 1989)

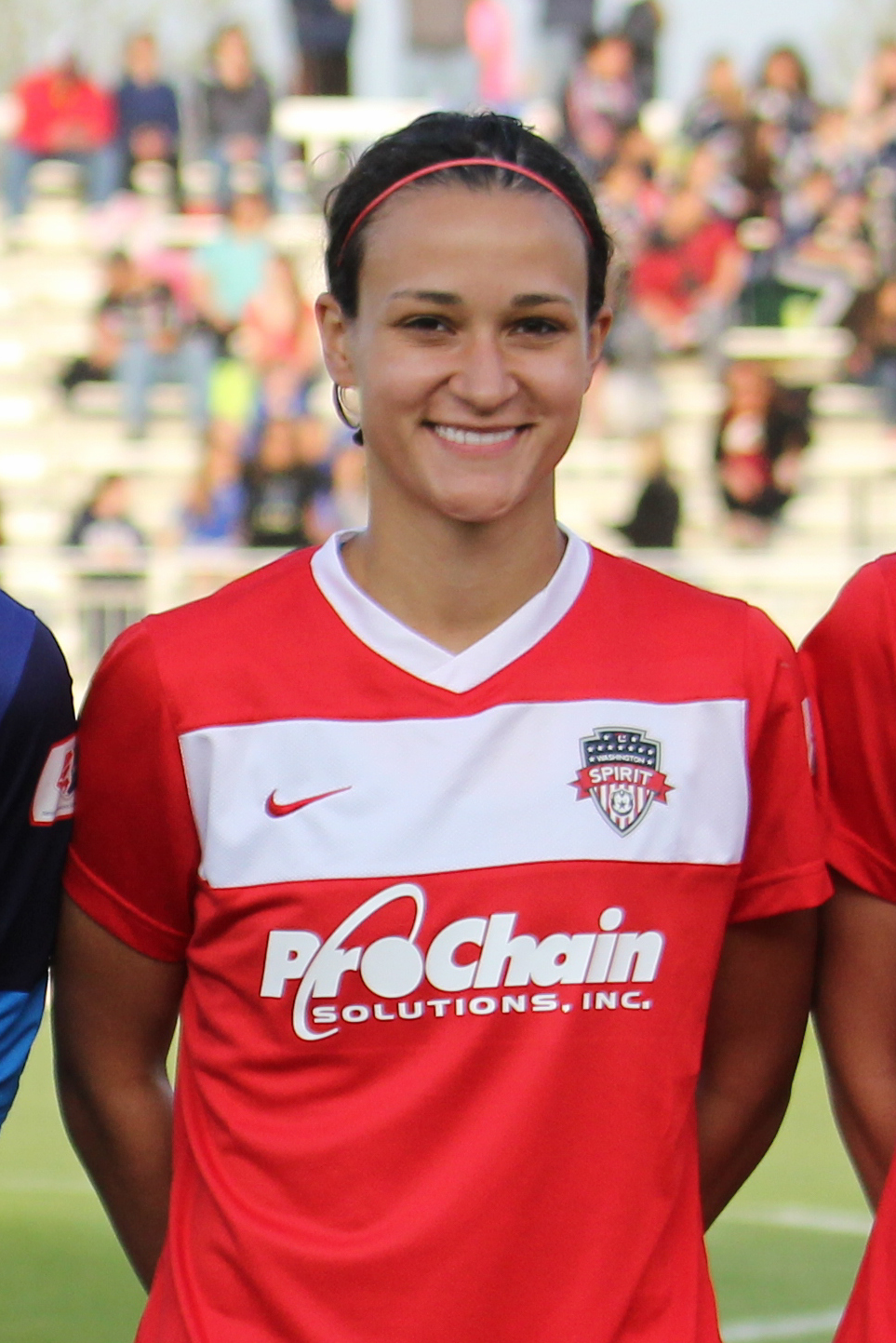

Personal information
- Full name: Gabriella Monique Toulouse
- Date of birth: May 3, 1989 (age 37)
- Place of birth: Arlington, Virginia, United States
- Height: 5 ft 6 in (1.68 m)
- Position: Defender

College career
Years	Team	Apps	(Gls)
2007–2010	Virginia Cavaliers		

Senior career*
Years	Team	Apps	(Gls)
2012	Rågsveds IF	21	(9)
2013	Washington Spirit	13	(0)
2014	Houston Dash	7	(0)

International career
2011–2012	United States U23		
- * Club domestic league appearances and goals as of August 20, 2014

Gabriella Monique "Kika" Toulouse (born May 3, 1989) is an American soccer player.

== Early life ==
Raised in Arlington, Virginia, Toulouse attended Bishop Denis J. O'Connell High School where she helped the team to three Washington Catholic Athletic Conference championship titles. She also played club soccer for Braddock Road Club (BRYC) and won six Virginia State Cup Championships with two different teams within the club.

=== University of Virginia Cavaliers ===
Toulouse attended the University of Virginia where she played for the Cavaliers from 2007 to 2011.

== Club career ==
=== Rågsveds IF ===
In 2012, Toulouse played for Rågsveds IF in the Swedish Football Division 4. She scored nine goals during her 2012 campaign including two hat-tricks, one of which occurred during her first professional game.

=== Washington Spirit ===
In February 2013, Toulouse signed with the Washington Spirit for the inaugural season of the National Women's Soccer League.

=== Houston Dash ===
On January 10, 2014, it was announced that the Houston Dash had selected Toulouse with the tenth and final pick in the 2014 NWSL Expansion Draft. She was waived by the Houston Dash in September 2014. She has since retired and currently works with the New York Red Bulls.

== International career ==
Toulouse has represented the United States as a member of the United States women's national under-23 soccer team.
