= Osinachi Ohale =

Nigerian footballer (born 1991)

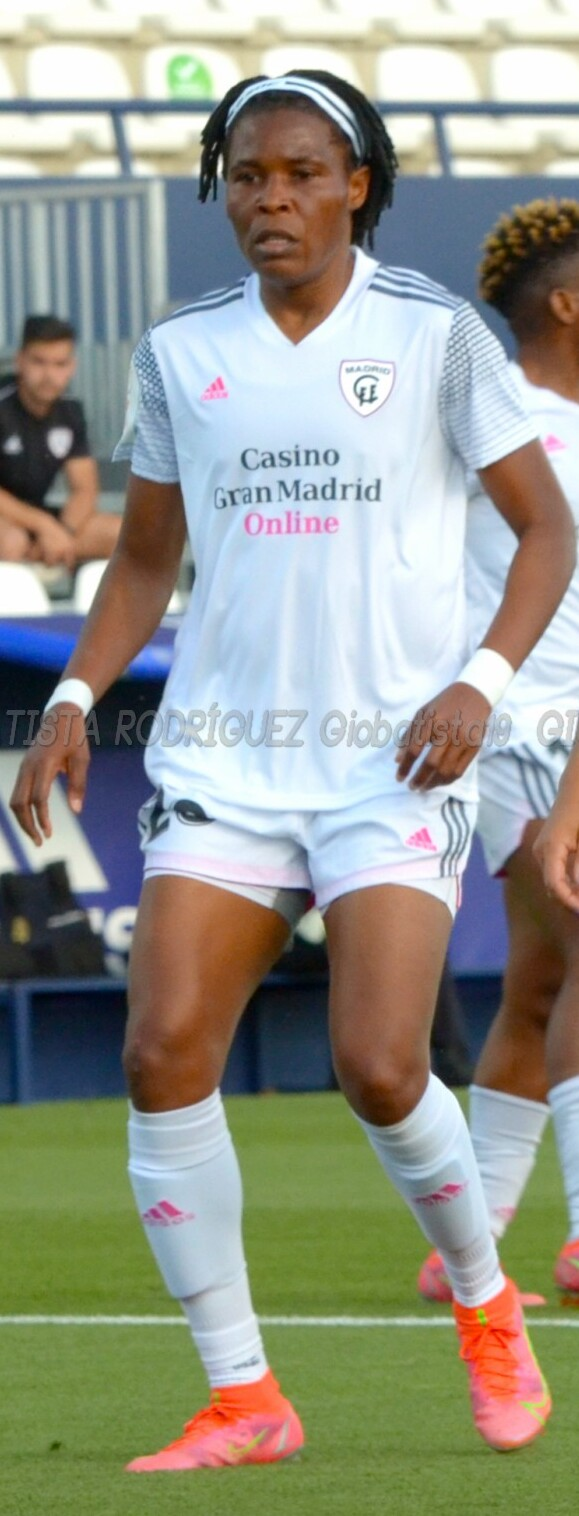
- Ohale with Madrid CFF in 2021

Personal information
- Full name: Osinachi Marvis Ohale
- Date of birth: 21 December 1991 (age 34)
- Place of birth: Abuja, Nigeria
- Height: 1.80 m (5 ft 11 in)
- Position: Centre-back

Team information
- Current team: Como 1907
- Number: 13

Senior career*
Years	Team	Apps	(Gls)
2008–2009	Rivers Angels		
2010–2014	Delta Queens		
2014	Houston Dash	19	(1)
2015–2017	Rivers Angels		
2017–2018	Vittsjö GIK	22	(1)
2018–2019	Växjö DFF	25	(0)
2019–2020	CD Tacón	15	(2)
2020	Roma	2	(0)
2021	Madrid CFF	17	(2)
2021–2023	Alavés	51	(3)
2023–2026	Pachuca	81	(6)
2026–	Como 1907	0	(0)

International career^{‡}
- Nigeria U20
2010–2026	Nigeria	87	(4)
- * Club domestic league appearances and goals as of 11 August 2026 ‡ National team caps and goals as of 15 August 2026

Osinachi Marvis Ohale OON (born 21 December 1991) is a Nigerian professional footballer who plays as a centre back or right back for Serie A Women club Como 1907 and the Nigeria women's national team.

== Club career ==
Ohale played for Houston Dash in the National Women's Soccer League throughout the 2014 season before returning home to Nigeria with Rivers Angels.

In 2016, she joined Swedish Damallsvenskan side Vittsjö GIK, playing for the club on 22 occasions before transferring to Växjö DFF eighteen months later in August 2018.

On 11 September 2019, she signed for Spanish side CD Tacón on a permanent transfer, playing her first game for the club in a 3–0 victory over Sporting de Huelva just three days later.

On 30 July 2020, Ohale signed for A.S. Roma Women, the Nigeria international parted ways with Spanish side CD Tacon (now renamed Real Madrid), after the expiry of her contract with the Primera Iberdrola outfit in June 2020. She joined the Serie A Women's League outfit on a one-year deal for an undisclosed fee. Reacting to her historic move, Ohale told the club website: "I chose Roma because of so many things; so many amazing things about the club, about this city and this country that interested me". "I felt like it would be a great thing for me, to explore and to experience new things and a new challenge".

On 22 January 2021, Ohale was announced at Madrid CFF.

On 14 July 2021, Ohale was announced at Alavés for the next two seasons until 2023.

== International career ==
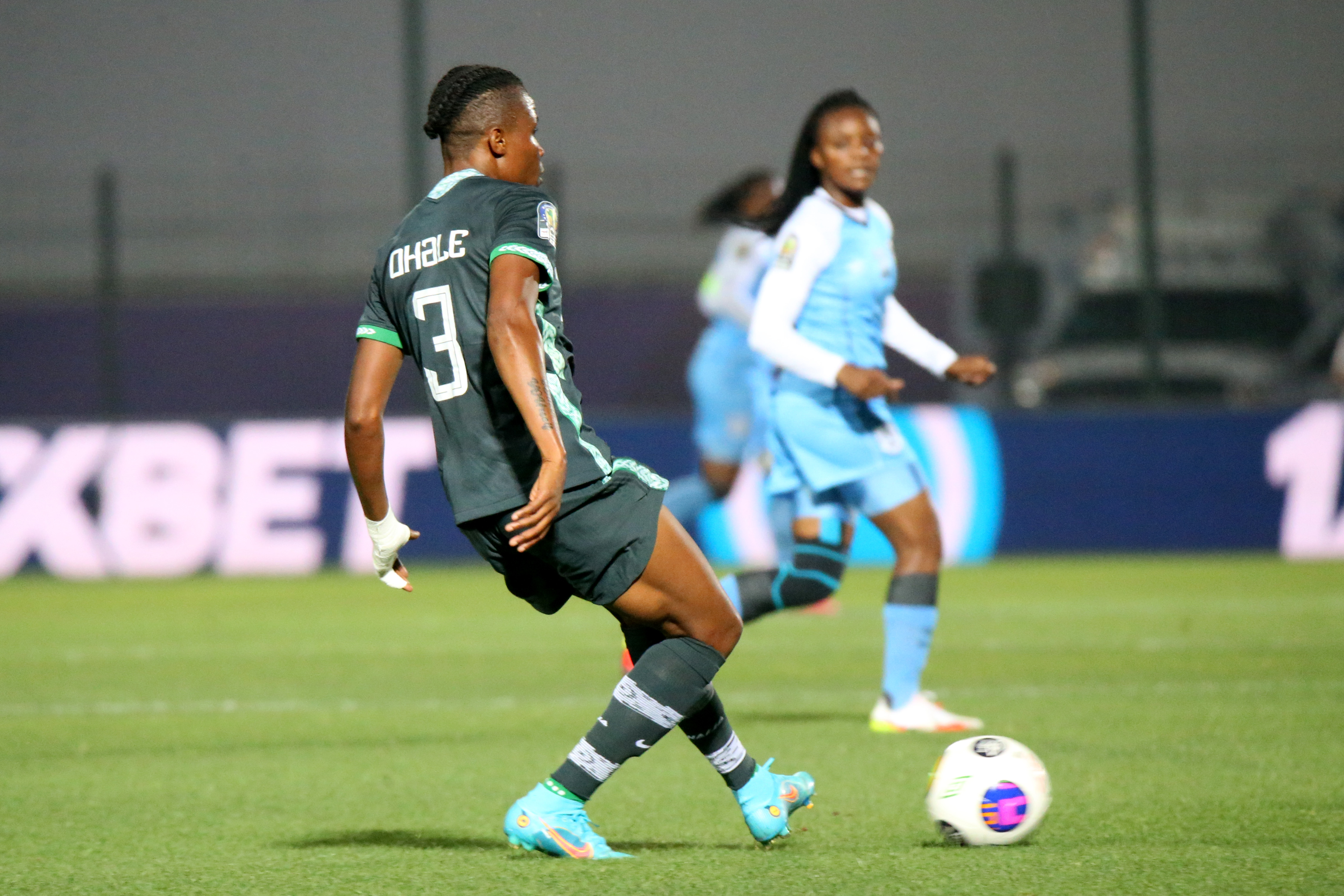
Osinachi Ohale during a match with Nigeria in July 2022

She represented Nigeria in the African Women's Championship tournaments of 2010, 2014, 2016 and 2018. She has won the competition on all four occasions.

She was also on the Nigerian squads of the FIFA Women's World Cup in 2011, 2015 and 2019.

On 24 May 2019, Ohale was called up to the Nigeria squad for the 2019 FIFA Women's World Cup.

Ohale was called up to the Nigeria squad for the 2022 Women's Africa Cup of Nations.

On 16 June 2023, she was included in the 23-player Nigerian squad for the FIFA Women's World Cup 2023. In their second group stage match against host country Australia, Ohale was solid in defence for the Super Falcons and went on to score the second goal of the game which gave Nigeria the lead against the hosts, although she was injured in scoring the goal after being accidentally kicked in the chest by Australian defender Alanna Kennedy. Her performance in the match earned her the Player of the Match award.

Ohale was called up to the Nigeria squad for the 2024 Summer Olympics. She was also part of the squad that won the 2024 Women's Africa Cup of Nations.

On Friday 25th September 2026, Ohale announced her retirement from international football after sixteen years with the national team.

== Career statistics ==
International goals

No.	Date	Venue	Opponent	Score	Result	Competition
1.	14 October 2014	Sam Nujoma Stadium, Windhoek, Namibia	Zambia	2–0	6–0	2014 African Women's Championship
2.	1 March 2019	Antonis Papadopoulos Stadium, Larnaca, Cyprus	Slovakia	2–0	4–3	2019 Cyprus Women's Cup
3.	27 July 2023	Lang Park, Brisbane, Australia	Australia	2–1	3–2	2023 FIFA Women's World Cup
4.	18 July 2025	Larbi Zaouli Stadium, Casablanca, Morocco	Zambia	1–0	5–0	2024 Women's Africa Cup of Nations

== Honours ==
Delta Queens

- Nigerian Women's Championship: 2011, 2012

Pachuca

- Liga MX Femenil: 2025 Clausura

Nigeria

- Women's Africa Cup of Nations: 2010, 2014, 2016, 2018, 2024

Individual

- CAF Team of the Year Women's XI: 2024
- Women's Africa Cup of Nations Team of the Tournament: 2022
- IFFHS CAF Women's Team of the Decade: 2011–2020
- IFFHS CAF Women's Team of The Year: 2022
