= Lindsay Elston =

American soccer midfielder

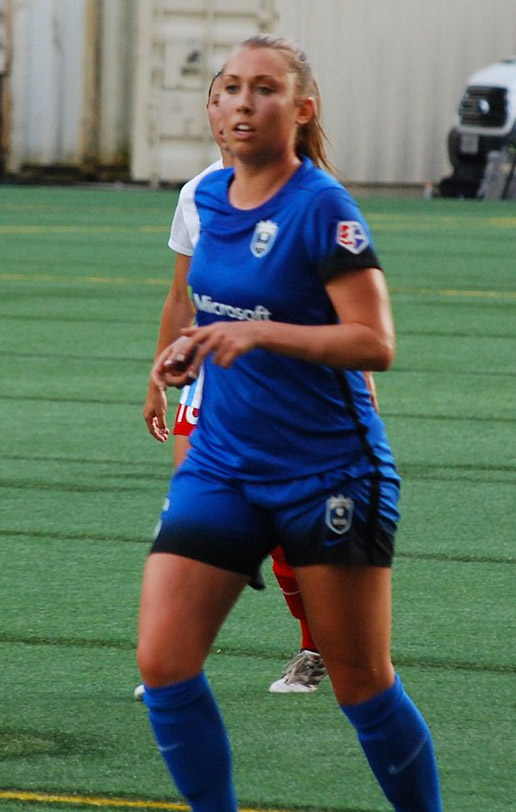
- Elston, July 2017

Personal information
- Full name: Lindsay Christina Elston
- Date of birth: April 30, 1992 (age 34)
- Place of birth: McMurray, Pennsylvania, United States
- Height: 5 ft 8 in (1.73 m)
- Position: Midfielder

College career
Years	Team	Apps	(Gls)
2010–2013	Washington Huskies		

Senior career*
Years	Team	Apps	(Gls)
2012	Seattle Sounders		
2014	Houston Dash	5	(0)
2014–2015	FC Metz	5	(1)
2016–2017	Seattle Reign FC	27	(1)

International career
2011	United States U20		
- * Club domestic league appearances and goals

Lindsay Christina Elston (born April 30, 1992) is an American soccer midfielder who played for FC Metz, the Houston Dash, and the Seattle Reign FC. She has represented the United States on the under-18 and under-20 national soccer teams. She announced her retirement in September 2017.

== Early life ==
Elston was born McMurray, Pennsylvania to parents Ann Louise and Cassius Elston. She attended Eastlake High School in Sammamish, Washington. In 2010, she was named the 2009–2010 Gatorade Washington Girls Soccer Player of the year

Elston played club soccer for Crossfire Premier.

=== University of Washington, 2010–2013 ===
Elston played for the Washington Huskies from 2010 through 2013. In September 2012, she was named Pac-12 Player of the Week.

== Playing career ==
=== Club ===
==== Seattle Sounders Women, 2012 ====
Elston played for the Seattle Sounders Women in 2012.

==== Houston Dash, 2014 ====
Elston was signed as a free agent by the Houston Dash for the 2014 season. She made her debut for the club during the season opener against the Portland Thorns FC. Elston made a total of five appearances for the club before she was waived to make room on the 20-player roster for forward Melissa Henderson. Elston had missed remarkable time with the club due to an ankle injury.

==== FC Metz, 2014–2015 ====
Elston signed with French first division club FC Metz for the 2014–2015 season. In June 2015, she helped the club win the Lorraine Cup after defeating ESAP Metz 4–0.

==== Seattle Reign FC, 2016–2017 ====
In April 2016, Elston signed with Seattle Reign FC for the 2016 National Women's Soccer League season. She announced her retirement on September 5, 2017 after being traded to the Boston Breakers.

=== International ===
Elston has represented the United States as a member of the U-18 and U-20 soccer teams

== See also ==
- List of University of Washington people
