= Cipó =

Municipality of Bahia, Brazil

- Municipality
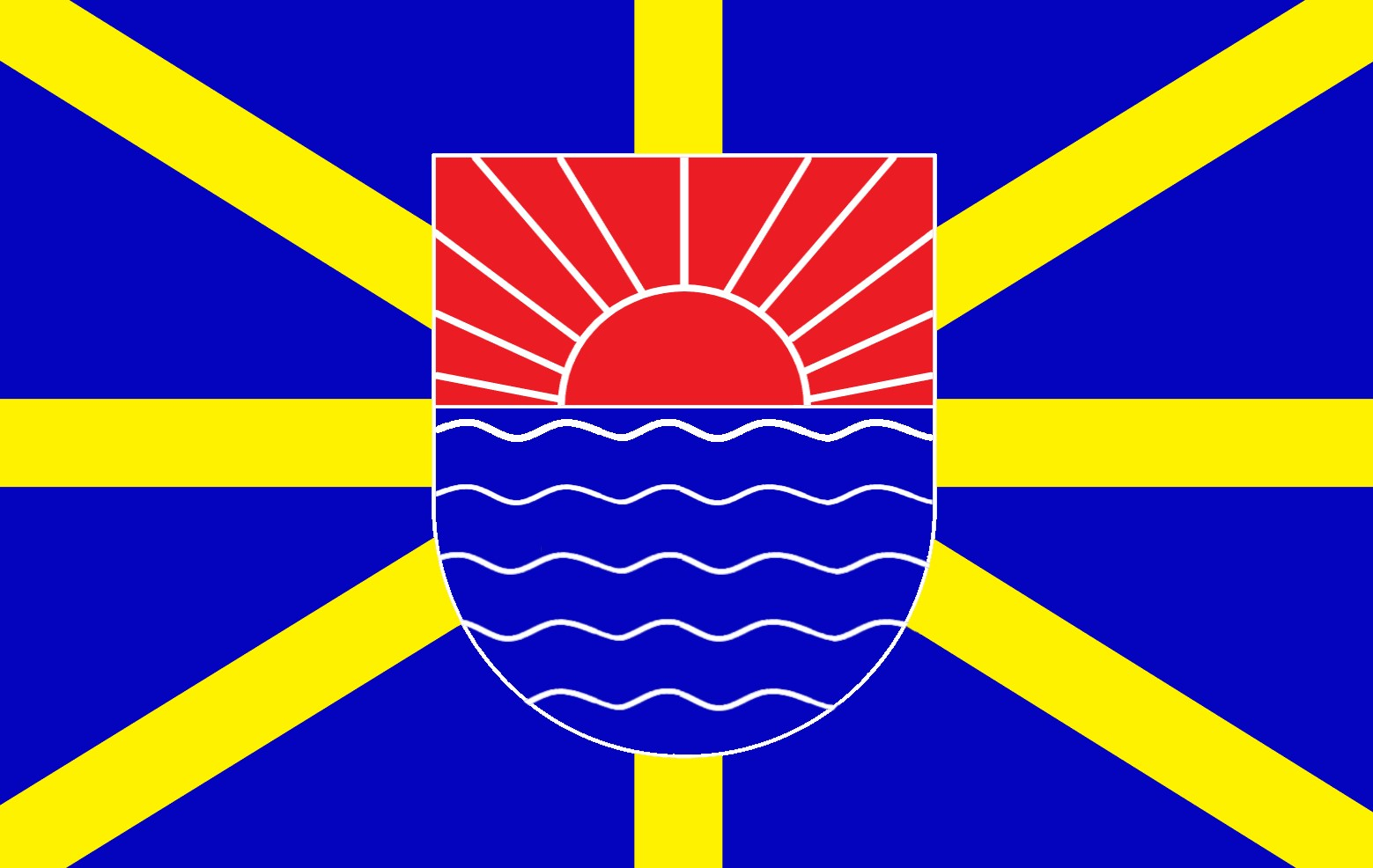
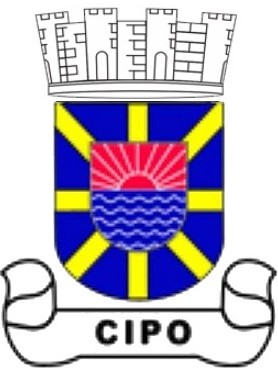
- Flag Coat of arms

- Location in Brazil
- Coordinates: 11°06′00″S 38°31′01″W
- Country: Brazil
- Region: Nordeste
- State: Bahia

Population (2020)
  - Total: 17,352
- Time zone: UTC−3 (BRT)

Cipó is a municipality in the state of Bahia in the North-East region of Brazil.

== Climate ==
Cipó experiences a hot semi-arid climate (Köppen: BSh) with hot temperatures throughout the year.

Climate data for Cipó (1991–2020)
Month	Jan	Feb	Mar	Apr	May	Jun	Jul	Aug	Sep	Oct	Nov	Dec	Year
Mean daily maximum °C (°F)	34.7 (94.5)	34.6 (94.3)	34.5 (94.1)	33.1 (91.6)	30.9 (87.6)	29.0 (84.2)	28.3 (82.9)	29.0 (84.2)	31.0 (87.8)	33.0 (91.4)	34.1 (93.4)	34.7 (94.5)	32.2 (90.0)
Daily mean °C (°F)	27.4 (81.3)	27.4 (81.3)	27.5 (81.5)	26.7 (80.1)	25.2 (77.4)	23.5 (74.3)	22.7 (72.9)	22.9 (73.2)	24.2 (75.6)	25.7 (78.3)	26.7 (80.1)	27.2 (81.0)	25.6 (78.1)
Mean daily minimum °C (°F)	21.8 (71.2)	22.2 (72.0)	22.2 (72.0)	21.8 (71.2)	20.8 (69.4)	19.4 (66.9)	18.2 (64.8)	18.0 (64.4)	18.8 (65.8)	20.2 (68.4)	21.3 (70.3)	21.7 (71.1)	20.5 (68.9)
Average precipitation mm (inches)	43.2 (1.70)	42.9 (1.69)	55.8 (2.20)	53.1 (2.09)	58.0 (2.28)	60.7 (2.39)	57.8 (2.28)	38.1 (1.50)	29.5 (1.16)	23.2 (0.91)	48.9 (1.93)	38.6 (1.52)	549.8 (21.65)
Average precipitation days (≥ 1.0 mm)	4.1	5.5	5.4	6.7	10.0	12.4	12.1	9.2	6.0	4.0	4.1	3.5	83.0
Average relative humidity (%)	61.6	62.9	64.0	68.8	74.6	79.2	79.7	76.2	70.8	65.5	63.1	61.9	69.0
Average dew point °C (°F)	19.9 (67.8)	20.3 (68.5)	20.6 (69.1)	20.9 (69.6)	20.8 (69.4)	20.3 (68.5)	19.7 (67.5)	19.1 (66.4)	19.1 (66.4)	19.3 (66.7)	19.5 (67.1)	19.8 (67.6)	19.9 (67.8)
Mean monthly sunshine hours	243.8	216.2	238.9	212.1	180.4	154.9	171.3	188.4	210.9	248.6	234.7	248.3	2,548.5
Source: NOAA

== See also ==
- List of municipalities in Bahia
