= Holly Hein =

American soccer player

Personal information
- Full name: Holly Elizabeth Hein
- Date of birth: October 1, 1991 (age 35)
- Place of birth: Castaic, California, United States
- Position: Defender

College career
| Years | Team | Apps | (Gls) |
| 2009–2013 | Michigan Wolverines | | |

Senior career*
| Years | Team | Apps | (Gls) |
| 2013 | Ottawa Fury | | |
| 2014 | Houston Dash | 8 | (0) |
| 2014 | Seattle Reign FC | 0 | (0) |
| 2015 | Åland United | 20 | (0) |
- * Club domestic league appearances and goals

Holly Elizabeth Hein (born October 1, 1991) is an American soccer defender who played for Finnish club Åland United in the Naisten Liiga. She previously played for the Houston Dash and Seattle Reign FC in the National Women's Soccer League.

== Early life ==
Born in Castaic, California, Hein attended West Ranch High School in Santa Clarita where she played for the varsity soccer team for two years. She also played club soccer for the Irvine Strikers and Real SoCal U18. In 2006, she was part of the USYSA national championship-winning team.

=== University of Michigan ===
Hein attended the University of Michigan from 2009 to 2013 where she played for the Wolverines for five years. During her first season with the team, she started in 19 of the games in which she played, scored three goals and served two assists. The following year, she missed the majority of the season due to injury but played in six matches. In 2011, she underwent surgery for thyroid cancer and missed the majority of the season. She returned in 2012 and started in all 24 matches of the season. As captain of the team playing in the defender position, she scored two goals. She was named to the All Big Ten First Team and NSCAA All-Great Lakes Region Second Team. In 2013, Hein captained the team for the second consecutive year and led a defensive line that set a new school record with only 12 goals conceded. She scored one goal and served one assist while starting all 23 matches in the season. She was subsequently named to the All Big Ten First Team for a second year as well as the NSCAA All-Great Lakes Region First Team. The same year, she was named a Lowe's Senior CLASS Award Finalist.

== Playing career ==
=== Houston Dash ===
In 2014, Hein signed with the Houston Dash for the 2014 National Women's Soccer League season as a discovery player. She made seven starts in her eight appearances for the team before being waived.

=== Seattle Reign FC ===
In July 2014, Hein signed with league-leading Seattle Reign FC. Of the signing, Reign FC head coach Laura Harvey said, "Holly has been training with us for several weeks and has quickly integrated into the group. She'll give us additional depth in the defense, which should prove valuable as we continue our push towards the playoffs."

== Honors ==
Seattle Reign FC

- NWSL Shield: 2014
