= Melissa Henderson =

American retired soccer forward

Personal information
- Full name: Melissa Suzanne Keeling
- Birth name: Melissa Suzanne Henderson
- Date of birth: August 23, 1989 (age 37)
- Place of birth: Dallas, Texas, U.S.
- Height: 5 ft 8 in (1.73 m)
- Positions: Forward; midfielder

College career
Years	Team	Apps	(Gls)
2008–2011	Notre Dame Fighting Irish	97	(70)

Senior career*
Years	Team	Apps	(Gls)
2012	Boston Breakers	4	(0)
2013–2014	FC Kansas City	22	(0)
2014–2017	Houston Dash	36	(0)
2016	→ Apollon Limassol (loan)		

International career^{‡}
2006	United States U-17		
2007–2008	United States U-20		
2009–2012	United States U-23		
- * Club domestic league appearances and goals as of September 9, 2016 ‡ National team caps and goals as of April 10, 2013

Melissa Suzanne Keeling (née Henderson; born August 23, 1989) is an American retired soccer forward who last played as a midfielder with the Houston Dash.

== Early life ==
Born in Dallas to Kelly and Kathy Henderson, Melissa grew up in Garland, Texas, and attended and played for Berkner High School in Richardson, Texas, where she received several honors and awards during her time. Henderson played three seasons for the varsity soccer squad and set school records with 66 goals and was second overall in assists with 45 (overall 177 points) in 47 career matches. Henderson did not play her senior season due to national-team commitments. She was named a Parade All-American following her sophomore and junior seasons, a two-time all-district performer at Berkner where she was also district MVP and all-area, two-time NSCAA youth All- American in 2006 and 2007, 2007 NSCAA/Adidas Youth Player of the Year, and became the first junior women's soccer player ever named Gatorade National High School Player of the Year (2006–07 season); only six other juniors (from any sport) have ever received the Gatorade national honor at the time. On top of Henderson's dominant high school soccer career she was also a three-year member of the National Honor Society, involved in student council, served as student council senior class secretary, helped coach younger soccer players and was a member of Young Life.

=== University of Notre Dame ===
Henderson attended University of Notre Dame where she majored in Psychology and was a star attacker for the Notre Dame Fighting Irish. During her junior year, she was nominated for an ESPY Award (her second nomination after being nominated once in high school). At the time of her graduation, Henderson ranked among the top 10 in school history in eight career categories, including goals (tied for fourth at 70), goals per match (tied for fourth at 0.72), points (ninth at 166), points per match (tenth at 1.71), match-winning goals (first at 24), match-winning points (second at 58), first goals (second at 24) and hat tricks (tied for first at six). She was one of 27 players in school history with at least 20 goals and 20 assists during her career and set single-season school records in 2009 for match-winning goals (nine) and first goals (10). She tied the school's single-season record for hat tricks at three in 2011 and matched the school record with four goals in 2009 during a win over Central Michigan and 2011 Senior Night victory over DePaul. She was one of two players in school history with two four-goal matches in her career. Henderson was one of four Fighting Irish players to ever have multiple eight-point matches in their careers and was the only player in school history to score three goals in the first half of a match. As a junior, she won the Honda Sports Award as the nation's top soccer player.

== Club career ==
=== Boston Breakers ===
Henderson was the second overall pick in the 2012 WPS Draft, going to Sky Blue FC, but the league folded before the season ever started. Following the suspension of the WPS, Henderson signed on with the Boston Breakers in the WPSL Elite where she played four games.

=== FC Kansas City ===
Henderson signed on as a free agent with FC Kansas City prior to the start of the inaugural 2013 season with the National Women's Soccer League.

=== Houston Dash ===
Henderson was acquired by the Houston Dash on July 9, 2014. She announced her retirement in October 2015. Henderson came out of retirement in February 2016 to rejoin the Dash for the 2016 season.

=== Retirement ===
Henderson announced her second retirement from professional soccer on June 14, 2017.

== International career ==
Henderson has extensive experience at the youth National Team level having played on the U-16, U-17, U-20 and U-23 teams. She was called into the full national team camp in 2011 as they trained for Olympic qualifiers.

== Personal life ==
Henderson graduated from the Notre Dame College of Arts and Letters in May 2012 with a bachelor's degree in psychology. She now uses the surname Keeling.

== Honors ==
Notre Dame Fighting Irish

- NCAA Division I Women's Soccer Championship: 2010

Individual

- Gatorade High School Soccer Player of the Year Award: 2007
- Honda Sports Award: 2010–11
