= Marissa Diggs =

American soccer player

Personal information
- Full name: Marissa Danielle Diggs
- Date of birth: April 8, 1992 (age 34)
- Place of birth: Rowlett, Texas, U.S.
- Height: 5 ft 7 in (1.70 m)
- Position: Defender

Youth career
- Dallas Sting

College career
Years	Team	Apps	(Gls)
2010–2013	UCF Knights		

Senior career*
Years	Team	Apps	(Gls)
2014	Houston Dash	13	(1)
- * Club domestic league appearances and goals

Marissa Danielle Diggs (born April 8, 1992) is an American retired soccer player who played as a defender. She last played for the Houston Dash of the National Women's Soccer League.

== Early life ==
Diggs was born in Rowlett, Texas, and played high school soccer at Rowlett High School. Diggs played club soccer for the Dallas Sting.

=== Collegiate career ===
Diggs attended the University of Central Florida where she played as a defender for the Knights. Diggs was a starter in all four collegiate seasons.

== Club career ==
=== Houston Dash, 2014 ===
Diggs was selected in the second round of the National Women's Soccer League college entry draft by the Houston Dash and played for the team during the 2014 season. She announced her retirement from professional soccer prior to the start of the 2015 season.

== Awards and honors ==
=== Individual ===
- Third Team NSCAA All-American: 2013
- American Conference Defender of the Year: 2013
- First Team All-American Conference: 2013
- Second Team NSCAA All-American: 2012
- Conference USA Defender of the Year: 2012
- First Team All-Conference USA: 2012
- First Team NSCAA All-Central Region: 2011
- First Team All-Conference USA: 2011
