= 2015 Houston Dash season =

Houston Dash
2015 season
- Managing Director: Brian Ching
- Head coach: Randy Waldrum
- Stadium: BBVA Compass Stadium
- NWSL: 5th
- NWSL Championship: Did not qualify
- Top goalscorer: Jessica McDonald (7)
- Highest home attendance: 13,025 (July 12 vs. Chicago; sellout, franchise record)
- Lowest home attendance: 3,499 (June 20 vs. Western New York)
- Average home league attendance: 6,413
- Biggest win: 2–0 v. WAS, April 10; 2–0 v. WNY, June 20
- Biggest defeat: 0–3 v. SEA, August 22
Home colors	Away colors
- All statistics correct as of September 7, 2015.

The 2015 season was the Houston Dash's second season as a professional women's soccer team. As a member of the National Women's Soccer League, United States' top-flight women's league, the Dash's schedule included 20 total games (10 home, 10 away) against eight other NWSL teams. The Dash sought to qualify for the playoffs for the first time in franchise history after finishing in last place during their inaugural season. The 2015 regular season began on April 10, 2015.

== Background ==
=== College draft ===
The Houston Dash selected University of Virginia and U.S. Women's National Team midfielder Morgan Brian with the first overall pick in the 2015 NWSL College Draft. The Dash also traded away the 13th overall pick in the 2015 draft and a second round pick in the 2016 College Draft to Portland Thorns FC for a player to be named later.

Houston Dash 2015 NWSL College Draft selections
Round	Overall	Player	Position	College
1	1	Morgan Brian	Midfielder	University of Virginia
4	31	Carleigh Williams	Defender	University of Central Florida

=== Preseason ===
Date	Opponents	Ground	Result F–A	Scorers	Notes
March 18, 2015	Houston Dynamo U-16	Houston Sports Park	0-2		
March 25, 2015	Houston Dynamo U-16	Houston Sports Park	0-5		
March 29, 2015	Texas Longhorns	Houston Sports Park	2–0	Henderson 55' Ohai 73'	

Colours: Green = Houston Dash win; Yellow = draw; Red = opponents win.

== Season review ==
=== April ===
The new-look Houston Dash kicked off the year's NWSL action with a 2-0 win over the Washington Spirit at BBVA Compass Stadium. Offseason acquisition Carli Lloyd scored the opening goal in first half stoppage time, and last season's club top goalscorer Kealia Ohai put away the second goal five minutes into the second half. The Dash looked revamped in attack and, defensively, collected their first shutout of the season.

Position at the end of April
Pos	Team	Pld	W	D	L	GF	GA	GD	Pts
3	Houston Dash	1	1	0	0	2	0	+2	3

== Club ==
=== Coaching staff ===
Position	Staff
Head coach	(United States) Randy Waldrum
Assistant coach	(Brazil) Marcelo Galvao
Assistant coach	(United States) Hiro Suzuki
Goalkeeper coach	(United States) Tom Brown
Athletic trainer	(United States) Kristy Chavez
Massage therapist	(United States) Wes Speights

Updated to match played September 5, 2015
Source: Houston Dash

=== Other information ===
Owner	(United States) Philip Anschutz
Co-Owners	(United States) Oscar De La Hoya (United States) Gabriel Brener
President of Business Operations	(United States) Chris Canetti
Managing Director	(United States) Brian Ching
Ground (capacity and dimensions)	BBVA Compass Stadium (7,000 (22,039) / 115x70 yards)
Training ground	Houston Sports Park

Updated to match played September 5, 2015
Source: Houston Dash

== Squad ==
The following is a list of players who were under contract with, or appeared on a gameday roster as an amateur call-up for, the Houston Dash during the 2015 season.

N	Pos.	Nat.	Name	Age	Since	App	Goals	Ends	Transfer fee	Notes
1	GK	(Canada)	Erin McLeod	32	2014	11	0	Undisclosed	Allocation	
2	DF	(United States)	Carleigh Williams	22	2015	2	0	Undisclosed	Free	Rookie season Waived July 27
2	MF	(Brazil)	Andressinha	20	2015	7	0	Undisclosed	Free	Signed July 27
3	FW	(United States)	Allie Bailey	21	2015	7	1	Undisclosed	Amateur	
4	DF	(Canada)	Lauren Sesselmann	32	2014	1	0	Undisclosed	Allocation	Inactive
5	GK	(United States)	Jordan Day	22	2015	0	0	Undisclosed	Amateur	
5	DF	(United States)	Toni Pressley	32	2015	15	0	Undisclosed	Trade	Acquired May 11
6	MF	(United States)	Morgan Brian	22	2015	10	0	Undisclosed	Free	Rookie season
7	FW	(United States)	Kealia Ohai	23	2014	19	4	Undisclosed	Free	
8	MF	(United States)	Jordan Jackson	24	2014	9	0	Undisclosed	Free	
9	DF	(Brazil)	Camila	20	2015	12	0	Undisclosed	Free	Acquired May 20
9	FW	(Republic of Ireland)	Stephanie Roche	26	2015	2	0	Undisclosed	Undisclosed	Waived May 20
10	MF	(United States)	Carli Lloyd	33	2015	12	4	Undisclosed	Allocation	
11	MF	(United States)	Brittany Bock	28	2014	5	0	Undisclosed	Expansion Draft	
12	FW	(United States)	Tiffany McCarty	24	2014	17	1	Undisclosed	Expansion Draft	
13	DF	(United States)	Jen LaPonte	26	2015	6	0	Undisclosed	Discovery signing	Signed Aug. 7; 5 app. as amateur
14	FW	(United States)	Jessica McDonald	27	2015	20	7	Undisclosed	Trade	
15	DF	(Canada)	Allysha Chapman	26	2015	5	0	Undisclosed	Allocation	Inactive
16	MF	(United States)	Ashley Nick	27	2014	3	0	Undisclosed	Trade	Traded May 11
17	DF	(Jamaica)	Lauren Silver	22	2015	0	0	Undisclosed	Amateur	
18	GK	(United States)	Bianca Henninger	24	2014	10	0	Undisclosed	Trade	
19	DF	(United States)	Niki Cross	30	2014	15	0	Undisclosed	Trade	Retired Aug. 1
20	MF	(United States)	Jordan O'Brien	22	2015	0	0	Undisclosed	Amateur	
21	FW	(United States)	Melissa Henderson	26	2014	20	0	Undisclosed	Trade	
22	DF	(United States)	Stephanie Ochs	25	2014	2	0	Undisclosed	Trade	Inactive from May 20
23	MF	(United States)	Cami Privett	22	2015	4	0	Undisclosed	Amateur	
24	DF	(Australia)	Ellie Brush	27	2015	15	1	Undisclosed	Free	Acquired May 20
25	DF	(United States)	Meghan Klingenberg	27	2014	12	0	Undisclosed	Allocation	
26	DF	(United States)	Jazmyne Avant	25	2015	1	0	Undisclosed	Amateur	
28	GK	(United States)	Megan Kinneman	23	2015	0	0	Undisclosed	Amateur	
30	DF	(United States)	Ella Masar	29	2014	19	2	Undisclosed	Expansion Draft	
40	MF	(England)	Rachael Axon	29	2014	15	1	Undisclosed	Discovery signing	

- Last updated: September 7, 2015
- Source: Houston Dash, NWSL
- Ordered by squad number.

Where a player has not declared an international allegiance, nation is determined by place of birth.

== Standings and match results ==
=== National Women's Soccer League ===
==== League standings ====
Pos	Team	Pld	W	D	L	GF	GA	GD	Pts	Qualification
1	Seattle Reign FC	20	13	4	3	41	21	+20	43	NWSL Shield
2	Chicago Red Stars	20	8	9	3	31	22	+9	33	NWSL Playoffs
3	FC Kansas City (C)	20	9	5	6	32	20	+12	32	NWSL Playoffs
4	Washington Spirit	20	8	6	6	31	28	+3	30	NWSL Playoffs
5	Houston Dash	20	6	6	8	21	26	−5	24	
6	Portland Thorns FC	20	6	5	9	27	29	−2	23	
7	Western New York Flash	20	6	5	9	24	34	−10	23	
8	Sky Blue FC	20	5	7	8	22	28	−6	22	
9	Boston Breakers	20	4	3	13	22	43	−21	15	

Source: NWSL
Rules for classification: Tiebreakers
(C) Champions

Results summary

Overall								Home						Away					
Pld	W	D	L	GF	GA	GD	Pts	W	D	L	GF	GA	GD	W	D	L	GF	GA	GD
20	6	6	8	21	26	−5	24	4	2	4	11	13	−2	2	4	4	10	13	−3

Last updated: September 7, 2015.
Source: Houston Dash

Results by matchday

Matchday	1	2	3	4	5	6	7	8	9	10	11	12	13	14	15	16	17	18	19	20
Ground	H	A	A	H	H	A	A	H	H	A	H	A	A	H	A	H	A	H	H	A
Result	W	D	L	L	D	W	D	D	W	L	L	D	W	W	L	L	L	L	W	D
Position (Note: Houston Dash's position in the league at the end of match day)	1	2	4	6	6	4	5	5	4	5	6	6	5	4	4	5	6	6	5	5

Updated to match(es) played on September 7, 2015. Source: Houston Dash
A = Away; H = Home; W = Win; D = Draw; L = Loss

==== Matches ====
April 10, Fri 1	Houston Dash	2–0	Washington Spirit	Houston, Texas
19:30 p.m. CDT UTC-5	Lloyd 45 +6'; Ohai 50'; Masar (yellow card) 71'	Dash report NWSL report Box		Stadium: BBVA Compass Stadium; Attendance: 6,012; Referee: Katja Koroleva

April 18, Sat 2	Sky Blue FC	1–1	Houston Dash	Piscataway, New Jersey
18:00 CDT UTC-5	Freels 14' (O'Hara) (yellow card) 90'	Dash report NWSL report Box	McDonald 52' (Brian)	Stadium: Yurcak Field; Attendance: 1,742; Referee: Elvis Mahmutovic

April 26, Sun 3	Boston Breakers	3–2	Houston Dash	Boston, Massachusetts
16:00 CDT UTC-5	King 8'; Ezurike 31' (McCaffrey); Evans (yellow card) 55' own goal 72' (Lloyd)	Dash report NWSL report Box	Cross (yellow card) 44'; McDonald 65' (Ohai) 58' (Brian); Roche (yellow card) 90'	Stadium: Soldiers Field Soccer Stadium; Attendance: 2,376; Referee: Danielle Chesky

May 2, Sat 4	Houston Dash	0–2	FC Kansas City	Houston, Texas
19:30 CDT UTC-5		Dash report NWSL report Box	Bogus 42' (unassisted); Groom 51' (Hagen); Moros (yellow card) 63'	Stadium: BBVA Compass Stadium; Attendance: 4,186; Referee: Margaret Domka

May 15, Fri 5	Houston Dash	2–2	Chicago Red Stars	Houston, Texas
19:30 CDT UTC-5	Axon 28' (penalty); Ohai 59' (Henderson); Masar (yellow card) 62'	Dash report NWSL report Box	Colaprico (yellow card) 43'; Huerta 60' (Hoy), 81' (unassisted)	Stadium: BBVA Compass Stadium; Attendance: 3,527; Referee: Randall Kelley

May 23, Sat 6	Portland Thorns FC	0–1	Houston Dash	Portland, Oregon
21:00 CDT UTC-5		Dash report NWSL report Box	McDonald 24'; Pressley (yellow card) 86'	Stadium: Providence Park; Attendance: 14,409; Referee: Matthew Kreitzer

May 31, Sun 7	Sky Blue FC	1–1	Houston Dash	Piscataway, New Jersey
14:00 CDT UTC-5	Haagsma 11' (Grubka); DeCesare (yellow card) 86'	Dash report NWSL report Box	Bailey 86' (unassisted)	Stadium: Yurcak Field; Attendance: 958; Referee: Levi Rippy

June 6, Sat 8	Houston Dash	0–0	Portland Thorns FC	Houston, Texas
19:30 CDT UTC-5	Camila (yellow card) 35'; Bock (yellow card) 45'	Dash report NWSL report Box	Terry (yellow card) 65'	Stadium: BBVA Compass Stadium; Attendance: 4,864; Referee: Danielle Chesky

June 20, Sat 9	Houston Dash	2–0	Western New York Flash	Houston, Texas
19:30 CDT UTC-5	McDonald 24'; Ohai 63'; Masar (yellow card) 74'	Dash report WNY report Box		Stadium: BBVA Compass Stadium; Attendance: 3,499; Referee: Ekaterina Koroleva

June 27, Sat 10	Washington Spirit	1–0	Houston Dash	Germantown, Maryland
18:00 CDT UTC-5	Dunn 56'	Dash report NWSL report Box	Camila (yellow card) 55'; Brush (yellow card) 78'	Stadium: Maureen Hendricks Field at the Maryland SoccerPlex; Attendance: 1,267; Referee: Matthew Franz

July 12, Sun 11	Houston Dash	1–2	Chicago Red Stars	Houston, Texas
19:30 CDT UTC-5	McCarty 57'; Brush (yellow card) 84'	Dash report NWSL report Box	Colaprico (yellow card) 3'; DiBernardo 19'; Hoy 61'	Stadium: BBVA Compass Stadium; Attendance: 13,025 (franchise record); Referee: Christopher Spivey

July 20, Mon 12	FC Kansas City	1–1	Houston Dash	Kansas City, Missouri
19:00 CDT UTC-5	own goal 55' (Pressley)	Dash report NWSL report Box	Masar (yellow card) 40'; Lloyd 45'	Stadium: Swope Soccer Village; Attendance: 3,557 (sellout); Referee: Randall Kelley

July 25, Sat 13	Western New York Flash	0–1	Houston Dash	Rochester, New York
18:00 CDT UTC-5		Dash report NWSL report Box	Lloyd 49' (Klingenberg)	Stadium: Sahlen's Stadium; Attendance: 4,110; Referee: Margaret Domka

July 29, Wed 14	Houston Dash	3–2	FC Kansas City	Houston, Texas
19:30 CDT UTC-5	Brush 12' (Ohai); McDonald 17' (Klingenberg); Lloyd 86' (Cross)	Dash report NWSL report Box	Holiday 3' (Rodriguez); Hagen 84'	Stadium: BBVA Compass Stadium; Attendance: 6,425; Referee: Matthew Mercier

August 1, Sat 15	Washington Spirit	3–1	Houston Dash	Germantown, Maryland
18:00 CDT UTC-5	Dunn 28', 36' (Matheson), 45+1' (Nairn)	Dash report NWSL report Box	McDonald 74' (Ohai)	Stadium: Maureen Hendricks Field Maryland SoccerPlex; Attendance: 5,418; Referee: Margaret Domka

August 7, Fri 16	Houston Dash	0–2	Sky Blue FC	Houston, Texas
19:30 CDT UTC-5		Dash report NWSL report Box	Nadim 38' (Levin); Killion (yellow card) 45'; Kerr 72' (unassisted)	Stadium: BBVA Compass Stadium; Attendance: 6,216; Referee: Christopher Spivey

August 12, Wed 17	Seattle Reign FC	2–1	Houston Dash	Seattle, Washington
21:00 CDT UTC-5	Mathias 22' (Rapinoe); Corsie 59' (Cox)	Dash report NWSL report Box	Ohai 15' (unassisted); Masar (yellow card) 70'; Brush (yellow card) 90+'	Stadium: Memorial Stadium; Attendance: 6,021; Referee: Cedric Adams

August 21, Fri 18	Houston Dash	0–3	Seattle Reign FC	Houston, Texas
19:00 CDT UTC-5		Dash report NWSL report Box	Little 42' (Barnes), 74', 90'	Stadium: BBVA Compass Stadium; Attendance: 9,530; Referee: Christina Hutchinson

August 30, Sun 19	Houston Dash	1–0	Boston Breakers	Houston, Texas
19:30 CDT UTC-5	Masar 34' (McDonald); Masar (yellow card) 35'	Dash report NWSL report Box	Schoepfer (yellow card) 89'	Stadium: BBVA Compass Stadium; Attendance: 6,842; Referee: Cedric Adams

September 6, Sun 20	Chicago Red Stars	1–1	Houston Dash	Bridgeview, Illinois
16:00 CDT UTC-5	DiBernardo (yellow card) 82'; Press 90' (Johnston)	Dash report NWSL report Box	Masar 62' (Brian)	Stadium: Toyota Park; Attendance: 5,623; Referee: Margaret Domka

== Awards ==
=== NWSL Player of the Month ===
Month	Player	Month's statline	Ref.
July	(United States) Carli Lloyd	3 goals; 3 appearances	

=== NWSL Player of the Week ===
Week	Result	Player	Ref.
7	Won	(United States) Bianca Henninger	

== Squad statistics ==
Field player statistics
N	Pos	Name	GP	GS	Min	G	A	WG	Shot	SOG	Cro	CK	Off	Foul	FS	YC	RC
2	MF	Andressinha	7	7	630	0	0	0	8	3	1	14	0	5	10	0	0
26	DF	Jazmyne Avant	2	2	171	0	0	0	0	0	0	0	0	0	0	0	0
40	MF	Rachael Axon	15	11	1,004	1	0	0	8	4	0	1	0	5	8	0	0
3	FW	Allie Bailey	7	0	126	1	0	0	4	3	0	0	0	2	1	0	0
11	MF	Brittany Bock	5	5	352	0	0	0	5	2	1	0	1	4	4	1	0
6	MF	Morgan Brian	10	10	810	0	3	0	7	5	0	4	0	8	5	0	0
24	DF	Ellie Brush	15	14	1,274	1	1	0	6	3	0	0	0	15	6	3	0
9	DF	Camila	12	6	511	0	0	0	7	1	0	4	0	11	11	2	0
15	DF	Allysha Chapman	5	4	376	0	0	0	1	1	0	0	0	7	0	0	0
19	DF	Niki Cross	15	12	1,148	0	1	0	3	1	0	2	0	6	10	1	0
21	FW	Melissa Henderson	20	14	1,123	0	2	0	16	9	0	50	6	8	7	0	0
8	MF	Jordan Jackson	9	3	334	0	0	0	0	0	0	2	1	5	1	0	0
25	DF	Meghan Klingenberg	12	12	1,046	0	2	0	7	1	0	0	1	3	3	0	0
13	DF	Jen LaPonte	6	3	315	0	0	0	0	0	3	0	0	0	1	0	0
10	MF	Carli Lloyd	12	12	1,080	4	0	3	56	15	0	2	6	15	12	0	0
30	FW	Ella Masar	19	18	1,606	2	0	1	7	6	1	0	0	11	9	6	0
12	FW	Tiffany McCarty	17	7	741	1	0	0	23	12	1	1	4	3	10	0	0
14	FW	Jessica McDonald	20	19	1,675	7	1	2	41	17	0	0	9	8	6	0	0
16	MF	Ashley Nick	3	2	182	0	0	0	1	0	0	0	0	2	2	0	0
22	DF	Stephanie Ochs	3	2	154	0	0	0	0	0	0	13	0	0	0	0	0
7	FW	Kealia Ohai	19	19	1,692	4	5	0	39	21	5	1	24	6	11	0	0
5	DF	Toni Pressley	15	15	1,306	0	0	0	3	0	0	0	0	6	4	1	0
23	MF	Cami Privett	4	2	205	0	0	0	2	0	0	0	0	1	2	0	0
9	FW	Stephanie Roche	2	0	24	0	0	0	1	0	0	0	0	1	0	1	0
4	DF	Lauren Sesselmann	1	1	45	0	0	0	0	0	0	0	0	1	0	0	0
2	DF	Carleigh Williams	2	1	151	0	0	0	0	0	0	0	0	0	1	0	0

Goalkeeper statistics
N	Pos	Name	GP	GS	Min	W	L	T	Shot	SOG	Sav	GA	GA/G	Pen	PKF	SO
18	GK	Bianca Henninger	10	9	868	3	4	3	132	44	34	11	1.100	0	1	4
1	GK	Erin McLeod	11	11	932	3	4	3	164	74	60	15	1.364	0	0	2

Source: NWSL
Key to positions: FW: Forward, MF: Midfielder, DF: Defender, GK: Goalkeeper
