= 2009 Chicago Red Stars season =

Chicago Red Stars
2009 season
- Chairman: Emma Hayes
- Manager: Peter Wilt
Home colors	Away colors

The 2009 Chicago Red Stars season was the first season of the soccer club, and it competed in the first season of Women's Professional Soccer league.

== Major events ==
=== Team news ===
The Chicago Red Stars team was one of the eight teams in the Women's Professional Soccer (WPS) League, the former top level professional women's soccer league in the United States that began play on March 29, 2009. The WPS was the highest level in the United States soccer pyramid for the women's game. During the WPS, the Chicago Red Stars played at Toyota Park in Bridgeview, IL - a suburb of Chicago.

== Squad ==
=== First-team squad ===
As of March 25, 2009.

Note: Flags indicate national team as defined under FIFA eligibility rules; some limited exceptions apply. Players may hold more than one non-FIFA nationality.

No.	Pos.	Nation	Player
1	GK	SWE	Caroline Jönsson
2	DF	USA	Marian Dalmy
3	FW	USA	Ella Masar
4	MF	SCO	Ifeoma Dieke
5	FW	USA	Lindsay Tarpley (captain)
6	MF	USA	Brittany Klein
7	MF	AUS	Heather Garriock
8	MF	USA	Megan Rapinoe
9	FW	USA	Danesha Adams
10	MF	USA	Carli Lloyd
11	FW	BRA	Cristiane

No.	Pos.	Nation	Player
12	MF	USA	Chioma Igwe
13	DF	USA	Natalie Spilger
14	FW	ENG	Karen Carney
15	DF	USA	Bonnie Young
16	DF	USA	Sarah Wagenfuhr
17	DF	USA	Michelle Wenino
18	MF	SWE	Frida Östberg
19	DF	IRL	Mary Therese McDonnell
20	GK	USA	Jaimel Johnson
23	DF	USA	Nikki Krzysik
25	GK	AUS	Lydia Williams

== Club ==
=== Management ===
Position	Staff
Technical Director	(England) Emma Hayes
Manager	(England) Emma Hayes
Assistant manager	(United States) Denise Reddy
Assistant manager	(United States) Nathan Kipp
Head athletic trainer	(United States) Laura Behr

Last updated: May 5, 2010
Source: http://chicagoredstars.com/history/

== Competitions ==
=== Women's Professional Soccer ===
==== Standings ====
Pos	Team	Pld	W	D	L	GF	GA	GD	Pts	Qualification
1	Los Angeles Sol	20	12	5	3	27	10	+17	41	Advance to Championship
2	Saint Louis Athletica	20	10	4	6	19	15	+4	34	Advance to Super Semifinal
3	Washington Freedom	20	8	5	7	32	32	0	29	Advance to First Round
4	Sky Blue FC	20	7	5	8	19	20	−1	26	Advance to First Round
5	Boston Breakers	20	7	4	9	18	20	−2	25	
6	Chicago Red Stars	20	5	5	10	18	25	−7	20	
7	FC Gold Pride	20	4	6	10	17	28	−11	18	

Source: Soccerway
Rules for classification: Tiebreakers

== WPS regular season ==
The Chicago Red Stars' WPS regular season kicked off on 4 April and it concluded on 5 August.

Win Tie Loss

April 4, 2009	Saint Louis Athletica	0–1	Chicago Red Stars	Edwardsville, IL, United States
		Report	Tarpley 78'	Stadium: Ralph Korte Stadium; Attendance: 5,008; Referee: ?

April 11, 2009	Washington Freedom	1–1	Chicago Red Stars	Germantown, Maryland, United States
	Sauerbrunn 54'	Report	Tarpley 29'	Stadium: Maryland SoccerPlex; Attendance: 5,028; Referee: ?

April 19, 2009	Chicago Red Stars	0–0	Sky Blue FC	Bridgeview, Illinois United States
		Report		Stadium: Toyota Park; Attendance: 5,824; Referee: ?

April 25, 2009	Chicago Red Stars	4–0	Boston Breakers	Bridgeview, Illinois United States
	Lloyd 21'; Rapinoe 39'; Carney 42'; Klein 52'	Report		Stadium: Toyota Park; Attendance: 4,118; Referee: Veronica Brito

May 10, 2009	Chicago Red Stars	0–2	Sky Blue FC	Bridgeview, Illinois United States
		Report	Walsh 8'; Kai 79'	Stadium: Toyota Park; Attendance: 3,664; Referee: Victor Herrera

May 16, 2009	Chicago Red Stars	0–1	FC Gold Pride	Bridgeview, Illinois United States
		Report	Sinclair 30'	Stadium: Toyota Park; Attendance: 4,884; Referee: Kari Seitz

May 23, 2009	Chicago Red Stars	0–2	Saint Louis Athletica	Bridgeview, Illinois United States
		Report	Dieke 25' (o.g.); Aluko 41'	Stadium: Toyota Park; Attendance: 4,461; Referee: Sandra Serafini

June 3, 2009	Los Angeles Sol	1–1	Chicago Red Stars	Carson, California United States
	Abily 90'	Report	Cristiane 88'	Stadium: The Home Depot Center; Attendance: 3,832; Referee: Felisha Mariscal

June 7, 2009	FC Gold Pride	1–1	Chicago Red Stars	Santa Clara, CA United States
	Sinclair 14'	Report	Cristiane 47'	Stadium: BuckShaw Stadium; Attendance: 2,956; Referee: Veronica Brito

June 13, 2009	Washington Freedom	2–1	Chicago Red Stars	Washington D.C., United States
		Report		Stadium: RFK Stadium; Attendance: ? Referee: ?

June 17, 2009	Sky Blue FC	1–0	Chicago Red Stars	Piscataway, NJ United States
	Rosana 24'	Report		Stadium: Yurcak Stadium; Attendance: 2,611; Referee: Veronica Brito

June 21, 2009	Chicago Red Stars	0–2	Boston Breakers	Bridgeview, Illinois United States
		Report	Rodriguez 22'; Lilly 90+'	Stadium: Toyota Park; Attendance: 3,889; Referee: Dallas Malhiwsky

June 27, 2009	Los Angeles Sol	4–0	Chicago Red Stars	Carson, California United States
	Boxx 15'; Abily 20'; Marta 62', 90+'	Report		Stadium: The Home Depot Center; Attendance: 4,653; Referee: Bryan Roslund

July 1, 2009	Chicago Red Stars	2–1	Washington Freedom	Bridgeview, Illinois United States
	Cristiane 48'; Tarpley 61'	Report	Wambach 34'	Stadium: Toyota Park; Attendance: 4,127; Referee: Sandra Serafini

July 12, 2009	Chicago Red Stars	3–1	FC Gold Pride	Bridgeview, Illinois United States
	Cristiane 31' (pen.), 45', 65'	Report	Milbrett 64'	Stadium: Toyota Park; Attendance: 5,127; Referee: Daniel Fitzgerald

July 15, 2009	Boston Breakers	1–0	Chicago Red Stars	Cambridge, MA United States
	Hucles 35'	Report		Stadium: Harvard Stadium; Attendance: 4,075; Referee: Ted Unkel

July 19, 2009	Sky Blue FC	1–0	Chicago Red Stars	Piscataway, NJ United States
	Hanks 62'	Report		Stadium: Yurcak Stadium; Attendance: 3,130; Referee: Jose Carlos Rivero

July 26, 2009	Chicago Red Stars	2–3	Washington Freedom	Bridgeview, Illinois United States
	Rapinoe 15'; Carney 69'	Report	Wambach 35', 56'; Long 89'	Stadium: Toyota Park; Attendance: 5,226; Referee: Sandra Serafini

August 2, 2009	Chicago Red Stars	3–1	Los Angeles Sol	Bridgeview, Illinois United States
	Lloyd 10'; Tarpley 46'; Cristiane 90+'	Report	Duan 90'	Stadium: Toyota Park; Attendance: 7,959; Referee: Kari Seitz

August 5, 2009	Saint Louis Athletica	2–0	Chicago Red Stars	Edwardsville, IL, United States
	Welsh 35', 65'	Report		Stadium: Ralph Korte Stadium; Attendance: 3,437; Referee: Daniel Radford

== Squad statistics ==
Rank	Scorer	G	A
1	(Brazil) Cristiane	7	0
2	(United States) Lindsay Tarpley	4	4
3	(United States) Megan Rapinoe	2	3
4	(England) Karen Carney	2	2
5	(United States) Carli Lloyd	2	1
6	(United States) Brittany Klein	1	3
7	(United States) Marian Dalmy	0	2
7	(United States) Ella Masar	0	2
9	(Australia) Heather Garriock	0	1

Statistics accurate as of 5 August 2009.

== Other information ==
Chairman	(United States) Peter Wilt
Ground (capacity and dimensions)	Toyota Park (20,000 / N/A)

Source: http://chicagoredstars.com/history/
