= Sheldon Thomas =

Sheldon Thomas may refer to:

- Sheldon Thomas (activist) (born 1964), English activist
- Sheldon Thomas (footballer) (born 1972), Trinidadian footballer
