= Andressinha =

Brazilian footballer (born 1995)

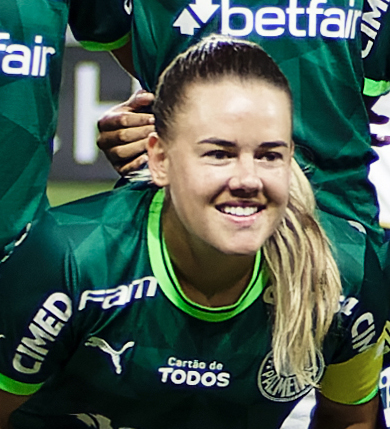
- Andressinha with Palmeiras in 2023

Personal information
- Full name: Andressa Cavalari Machry
- Date of birth: 1 May 1995 (age 31)
- Place of birth: Roque Gonzales, Rio Grande do Sul, Brazil
- Height: 1.61 m (5 ft 3 in)
- Position: Midfielder

Team information
- Current team: Palmeiras
- Number: 20

Senior career*
Years	Team	Apps	(Gls)
2009	E.C. Pelotas/Phoenix		
2010–2015	Kindermann	13	(6)
2015–2017	Houston Dash	42	(3)
2015	→ Tiradentes (loan)	8	(2)
2017	→ Iranduba (loan)		
2018–2019	Portland Thorns	27	(1)
2018	→ Iranduba (loan)	6	
2020–2021	Corinthians	34	(3)
2022–	Palmeiras	15	(1)

International career^{‡}
2012–	Brazil	43	(10)
Medal record
Women's football
Representing Brazil
Pan American Games
Gold medal – first place	2015 Toronto	Team
- * Club domestic league appearances and goals as of 3 December 2022 (UTC) ‡ National team caps and goals as of 3 October 2017

Andressa Cavalari Machry (born 1 May 1995), commonly known as Andressa or Andressinha, is a Brazilian professional footballer who captains and plays as a midfielder for SE Palmeiras and the Brazil women's national team. She participated in the 2015 FIFA Women's World Cup and the 2019 FIFA Women's World Cup.

== Early life ==
Andressinha was born in Roque Gonzales in the southern state of Rio Grande do Sul. She played futsal as she grew up. She started playing football at a young age and had the support of her father, Elizeu Machry, who would take her to training and games. Her father was also a professional footballer.

== Club career ==
Andressinha started her football career at Esporte Clube Pelotas in Nova Esperança do Sul after the club conducted an open tryout in 2009. The following year, she joined Kindermann of Santa Catarina, and remained with the team until 2014, when she was called to the Brazilian national team. Andressa helped the team win League titles in 2010, 2011, 2012 and 2013, and reach the Brazilian Women's Soccer League finals in 2014.

In league and cup competitions from 2012 to 2014, Andressa appeared in 28 matches (26 starts) and scored ten goals, and she led the team in goals in 2011 and 2013.

=== Houston Dash ===
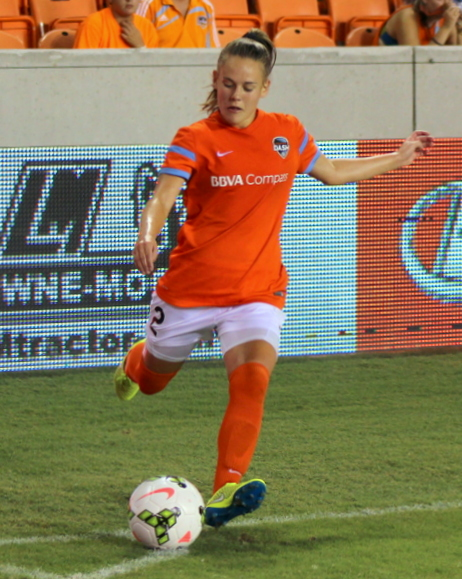
Andressinha with Houston Dash in 2015

On 27 July 2015, Andressa joined the Houston Dash, wearing No. 2. with the arrival of Andressinha, it was necessary to open a vacancy and for that the defender Carleigh Williams has been waived to make room on the 20-player roster.

Andressinha made her debut for Houston against FC Kansas City on 29 July 2015. She started all seven games for the Dash that season but scored no goals. At the end of 2015 season, she was named Young Player of the Year.

==== 2016 ====
Andressinha appeared in all of Houston Dash's preseason games, where she scored her first goal for her new club from a free-kick in a 3–0 win against Oregon State Beavers at Providence Park. Andressinha ended the season having scored one goal, and made 15 appearances for the dash in NWSL regular reason. Her goal came against Orlando Pride on 24 April 2016, which was the first match between the two expansion clubs.

==== 2017 ====
During that season, Andressinha played 21 games and scored two goals for the Texas club.

==== Iranduba (2017 loan) ====
In the NWSL offseason, Andressinha played for Iranduba in the Amazonian Women's Football Championship and was crowned champions.

=== Portland Thorns ===
After three seasons in Houston, Andressa was traded to the Portland Thorns FC in January 2018. She missed all of Portland's preseason games as she was playing for Brazil at the 2018 Copa América Femenina in Chile. Andressinha made her debut for Portland Thorns against Utah Royals FC on 28 April 2018, where she came on as a 64th-minute substitute for Celeste Boureille. On 11 May 2018, she scored her first goal for the team, a free kick that gave the Thorns the lead in their eventual 3–1 win.

== International career ==
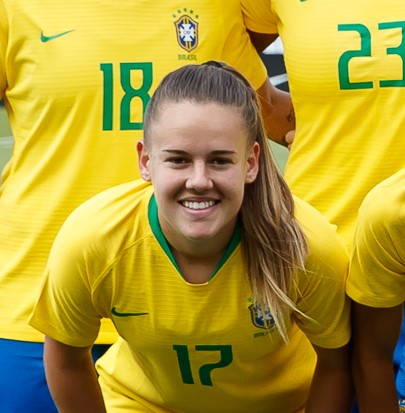
Andressinha in the starting XI for the Brazilian National Team

Andressa played for Brazil at the 2010 and 2012 editions of the FIFA U-17 Women's World Cup. At the latter tournament, she was the captain and playmaker of the Brazilian team who narrowly lost to Germany in the quarter-finals. Tournament organizers FIFA compared her potential to that of Marta.

She made her senior debut in December 2012, against Denmark at the 2012 Torneio Internacional Cidade de São Paulo de Futebol Feminino.

Andressa scored her first goal for Brazil in December 2014, a free-kick in a 4–1 Torneio Internacional de Brasília de Futebol Feminino win over China. She was playing alongside the experienced Formiga as a holding midfielder and was praised by the team coach Vadão, who said: "whenever I am asked about the future of women's football, I speak of Andressinha."

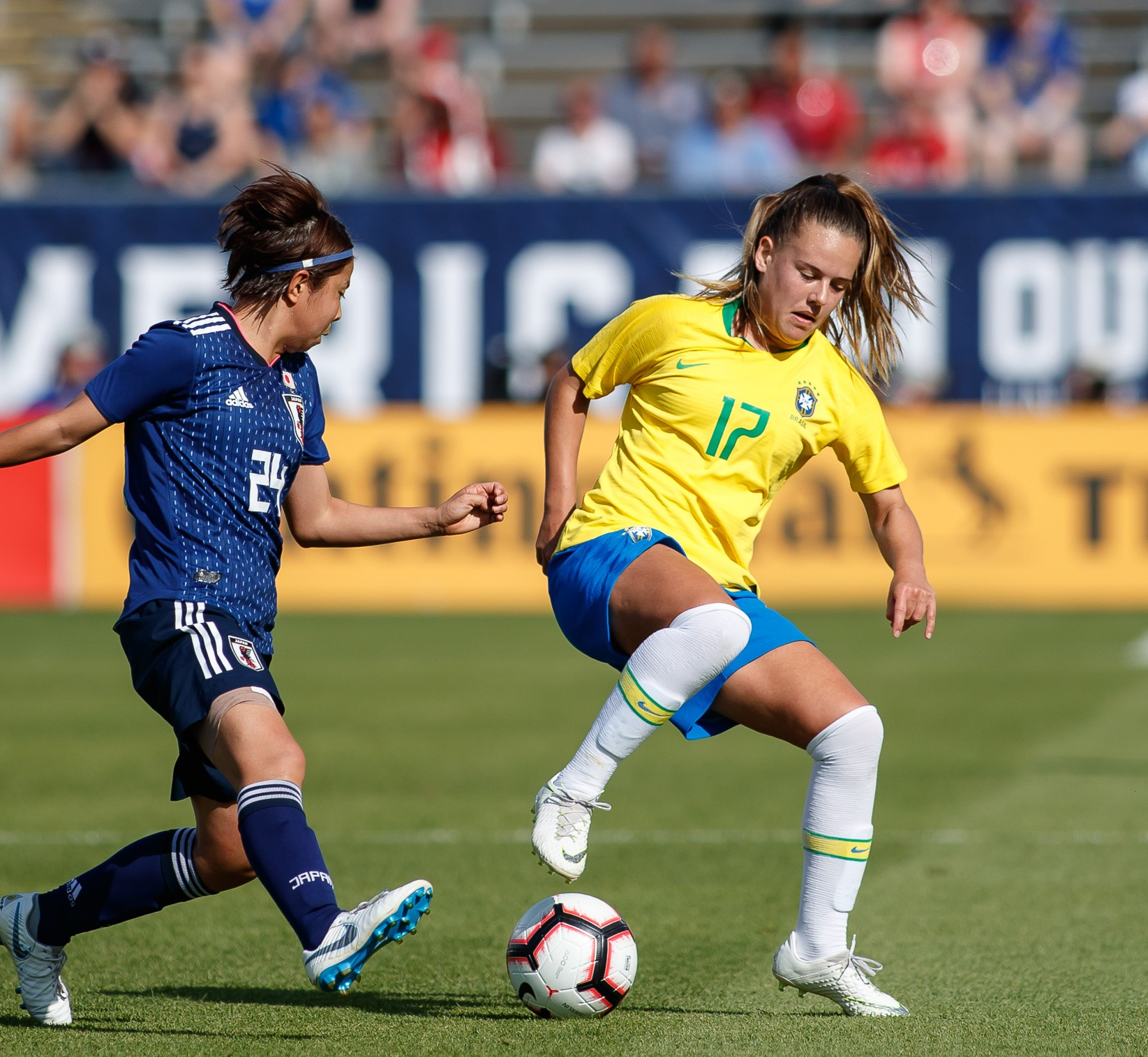
Andressinha playing for the Brazilian National Team in 2018

In February 2015, Andressa was included in an 18-month residency programme intended to prepare the national team for the 2015 FIFA Women's World Cup in Canada and the 2016 Rio Olympics. At the 2015 FIFA Women's World Cup, Andressa played in all three matches as Brazil qualified from their group without conceding a goal. She was named FIFA's Player of the Match in the final group game, a 1–0 win over Costa Rica. In Brazil's 1–0 second-round defeat by Australia, Andressa played the full 90 minutes. She remained in Canada as part of the Brazilian selection for the 2015 Pan American Games in Toronto.

She played in two of Brazil's four games at the 2019 Women's World Cup in France. She started and played the full 90 minutes in Brazil's group-stage win over Italy that secured advancement to the knockout rounds, and came on in the 75th minute of their round-of-16 loss to France.

=== International goals ===
Goal	Date	Location	Opponent	#	Score	Result	Competition
1	2014-12-18	Brasília, Brazil	China	1.1	2–0	4–1	Torneio Internacional 2014
2	2016-12-7	Manaus, Brazil	Costa Rica	1.1	1–0	6–0	Torneio Internacional 2016
3	2016-12-14	Manaus, Brazil	Italy	1.1	1–0	3–1	Torneio Internacional 2016
4	2016-12-18	Manaus, Brazil	Italy	2.1	3–2	5–3	Torneio Internacional 2016
5	2016-12-18	Manaus, Brazil	Italy	2.2	4–2	5–3	Torneio Internacional 2016
6	2017-07-31	San Diego, United States	United States	1.1	1–0	3–4	2017 Tournament of Nations
7	2017-07-31	San Diego, United States	United States	1.2	3–1	3–4	2017 Tournament of Nations
8	7 April 2018	Coquimbo, Chile	Ecuador			8–0	2018 Copa América Femenina
9	13 April 2018	Coquimbo, Chile	Bolivia			7–0	2018 Copa América Femenina
10	13 April 2018	Coquimbo, Chile	Bolivia			7–0	2018 Copa América Femenina
