= Vendula =

Vendula is a female given name. The name is of Czech origin and originated as a nickname for Václava, the feminine form of name Václav.

== Notable bearers ==
- Vendula Dušková (born 1998), Czech Paralympic swimmer
- Vendula Frintová (born 1983), Czech triathlete
- Vendula Hopjáková (born 1996), Czech snowboarder
- Vendula Kotenová (born 1994), Czech luger
- Vendula Přibylová (born 1996), Czech ice hockey player
- Vendula Strnadová (born 1989), Czech footballer
- Vendula Valdmannová (born 2007), Czech tennis player
