= Chioma Igwe =

American soccer player (born 1986)

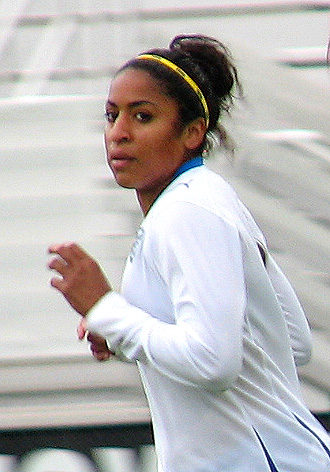

Personal information
- Full name: Chioma Nisa Igwe
- Date of birth: July 21, 1986 (age 40)
- Place of birth: San Mateo, California, United States
- Height: 5 ft 6 in (1.68 m)
- Position: Midfielder

Youth career
- 2000–2003: Notre Dame HS

College career
Years	Team	Apps	(Gls)
2004–2005	California Golden Bears		
2006–2007	Santa Clara Broncos		

Senior career*
Years	Team	Apps	(Gls)
2008	SoccerPlus Connecticut		
2008–2009	1. FC Saarbrücken	5	(0)
2009	Chicago Red Stars	15	(0)
2010	Boston Breakers	8	(0)
2011–2015	SC Freiburg	61	(4)
2015–2017	SC Sand	43	(2)
Total		132	(6)

International career
2004	United States U19		
2007	United States U21		
- * Club domestic league appearances and goals

Chioma Nisa Igwe (born July 21, 1986) is an American former soccer midfielder. The San Mateo, California native is a former member of the United States U-20 women's national soccer team.

From the 2011/12 until 2014/15 she played in the German Bundesliga for Freiburg. In May 2015, it was announced that Igwe had joined SC Sand.

Igwe's father played on the Nigeria national football team after playing at the University of San Francisco (1975 to 1979). Her name "Chioma" means "God is good" in Igbo.

By the end of 2016/17 season, she announced her retirement from professional soccer, at the age of 30.
