= Sheldon Thomas (footballer) =

Trinidadian footballer

Personal information
- Full name: Sheldon Thomas
- Date of birth: December 8, 1972 (age 53)
- Place of birth: Trinidad and Tobago
- Position: Midfielder

College career
Years	Team	Apps	(Gls)
1996–1998	Cal State Fullerton Titans		

Senior career*
Years	Team	Apps	(Gls)
1998	South China AA	6	(5)
1998–2000	Orange County Waves	20	(1)
2000	LA Galaxy	1	(0)

International career^{‡}
1998	Trinidad and Tobago	3	(0)
- * Club domestic league appearances and goals as of August 14, 2017 ‡ National team caps and goals as of August 14, 2017

Sheldon Thomas (born December 8, 1972) is a Trinidadian former footballer. He played for South China Athletic Club, Orange County Waves and LA Galaxy and was capped three times for Trinidad & Tobago.

== Club career ==
=== Early career ===
Thomas attended El Camino College and Saint Benedict's College before studying at California State University in 1996. He was named All American and Athlete of the Year in 1996 and 1997 for the Mountain Pacific Division.

=== South China Athletic Club ===
After graduating, Thomas joined Hong Kong side South China Athletic Club. He won honors of MVP with a double championship in the Vice Roy Cup and the Hong Kong FA Cup. During his time in Asia, he also represented the club in the Asian Club Championships.

=== Orange County Waves ===
Thomas moved back to the United States in 1999 and joined Orange County Waves.

=== LA Galaxy ===
In 2000, Thomas was called up to represent LA Galaxy, the parent club of the Orange County Waves, in the World Club Championships. Sheldon made a single appearance for the club with a nine-minute cameo from the bench.

== International career ==
Thomas was called up to the Trinidad & Tobago national team in 1998. He made his international debut in a 2–1 win over Martinique in the Caribbean Cup, and also featured in wins against Dominica and Haiti.
