= Mikka Hansen =

Danish footballer (born 1975)

Personal information
- Full name: Mikka Kirsten Hansen
- Date of birth: 11 November 1975 (age 50)
- Place of birth: San Jose, California, U.S.
- Height: 5 ft 5 in (1.65 m)
- Position: Forward

College career
Years	Team	Apps	(Gls)
1993–1996	Santa Clara Broncos		

Senior career*
Years	Team	Apps	(Gls)
1996–1998	Denver Diamonds		
1999	FB		
1999–2000	Fortuna Hjørring		
2001–2002	Carolina Courage	19	(1)

International career^{‡}
1999	Denmark	12	(0)
- * Club domestic league appearances and goals ‡ National team caps and goals as of 21:10, 25 May 2021 (UTC)

Mikka Kirsten Hansen (born 11 November 1975) is a Danish international footballer who played as a forward for the Denmark national team. She was part of the team at the 1999 FIFA World Cup.

== Club career ==
Hansen played for the USL W-League club Denver Diamonds, where she was the league's top assist provider in 1996 and second top goal scorer in 1998. In January 1999, she moved to Denmark to play for Frederiksberg Boldklub on a semi-professional basis. In summer 1999, after playing in the FIFA World Cup, Hansen signed a one-and-a-half-year contract with Fortuna Hjørring. By May 2000, Hansen had grown weary of football and had started competing as an elite cyclist instead.

Women's United Soccer Association (WUSA), the first official professional women's soccer league in the United States, began in 2001. Hansen was a ninth-round draft pick (70th overall in the global draft) by the Carolina Courage. In 2001 Hansen started seven of her 19 regular season appearances, scoring once. She was released by the team in January 2002.

== International career ==
Hansen was briefly part of the United States national under-20 team, but decided to play for Denmark at senior level. She won her first cap in a 1–1 draw with Australia at the 1999 Algarve Cup on March 14, 1999. Deployed on the left wing by Denmark, Hansen won a total of 12 caps, all in 1999, including a 3–0 1999 FIFA World Cup Group A defeat by the United States at Giants Stadium on June 19, 1999.
