= Tamie Batista =

American soccer player (born 1968)

Personal information
- Full name: Tamie Terice Shadle
- Birth name: Tamie Terice Batista
- Date of birth: January 2, 1968 (age 58)
- Place of birth: California, United States
- Height: 5 ft 3 in (1.60 m)
- Position: Midfielder

College career
Years	Team	Apps	(Gls)
1987–1989	Santa Clara Broncos		

International career
1993	United States	1	(0)

Managerial career
- 1998–1999: San Jose State Spartans (assistant)
- 2000–2002: San Jose State Spartans

Tamie Terice Shadle (formerly Grimes, née Batista; born January 2, 1968) is a retired American soccer midfielder who was a member of the United States women's national soccer team. She also served as the head coach of San Jose State Spartans from 2000 to 2002 (the first season on an interim basis).

== International career statistics ==
Nation	Year	International Appearances				
Nation	Year	Apps	Starts	Minutes	Goals	Assists
United States	1993	1	0	2	0	0
Career Total	1	1	0	2	0	0
