= Jennifer Lalor =

American soccer player (born 1974)

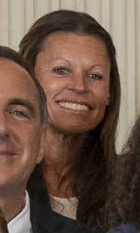
- Lalor in 2024

Personal information
- Full name: Jennifer Ann Nielsen
- Birth name: Jennifer Ann Lalor
- Date of birth: September 5, 1974 (age 52)
- Place of birth: San Diego, California, U.S.
- Height: 5 ft 2 in (1.57 m)
- Position: Midfielder

College career
Years	Team	Apps	(Gls)
1992–1996	Santa Clara Broncos		

Senior career*
Years	Team	Apps	(Gls)
1997–1998	Shiroki Serena		
1998	Frederiksberg Boldklub		
1999	Hammarby		
2000	San Diego WFC		
2001–2002	New York Power		
2003	San Diego Spirit		

International career
1992–2001	United States	23	(2)

Managerial career
- 2010–2017: San Diego WFC SeaLions
- 2021–2022: Albion SC
- 2023–2026: NJ/NY Gotham FC (assistant)
- 2026–: Portland Thorns FC (assistant)
Medal record
FIFA Women's World Cup
Bronze medal – third place	1995 USA	Team competition
- * Club domestic league appearances and goals

Jennifer Ann Nielsen (née Lalor; born September 5, 1974) is an American former soccer midfielder who is an assistant coach for Portland Thorns FC of the National Women's Soccer League (NWSL). She made 23 appearances for the United States national team from 1992 to 2001.

== Life ==
Born in Chula Vista, California, Lalor attended Bonita Vista High School and helped the soccer team to two undefeated seasons and clinch two Metro League titles. She opted not to play high school soccer during her junior and senior years and instead played for the Southern California Blues club team.

=== Santa Clara University ===
Lalor attended Santa Clara University, where she played for the Broncos from 1992 to 1996. In 1994, she led the team in assists with 20. She was named to the NSCAA All-American team in 1993, 1994 and 1996. Lalor played in two Final Fours with the Broncos and led the nation in assists in 1994 and 1996. She was a finalist for the Missouri Athletic Club Award and Hermann Trophy in 1993 and 1994.

Lalor was the first player to ever receive a full scholarship for soccer to Santa Clara. She was inducted into the Santa Clara Hall of Fame in 2008.

== Playing career ==
=== Club ===
From 1997 to 1998, Lalor played professionally in Japan for Shiroka Serena. In 1998, she played in Denmark for FB. In 1999, she played for Swedish club, Hammarby.

==== WUSA ====
Lalor was selected in the second round of the WUSA Inaugural Draft by the New York Power. She played for the Power from 2001 to 2002. In 2003, she played for the San Diego Spirit.

=== International ===
Lalor was a member of the United States women's national soccer team player pool from 1987 to 1995. Her first appearance for the senior team occurred on August 18, 1992 in a match against Norway. She scored her first goal on August 13, 1994 during a match against Mexico. She previously represented the United States on the U-16, U-19, U-20 levels. From 1987 to 1991, she played for the U.S. Under-16 and Under-19 National Team. In 1993, she competed with the U-20 National team in France, when the team won the International Women's Tournament.

In 1995, she was part of the team that took home bronze at the Women's World Cup in Sweden. She returned to the national team player pool in 2001.

In 2012, she was nominated for entry into the National Soccer Hall of Fame.

== Coaching career ==
On February 15, 2023, Lalor was appointed as an assistant coach for NJ/NY Gotham FC. On April 13, 2026, Portland Thorns FC announced their hiring of Lalor as an assistant coach of individual development.
