= Nikki Phillips (soccer) =

Polish footballer

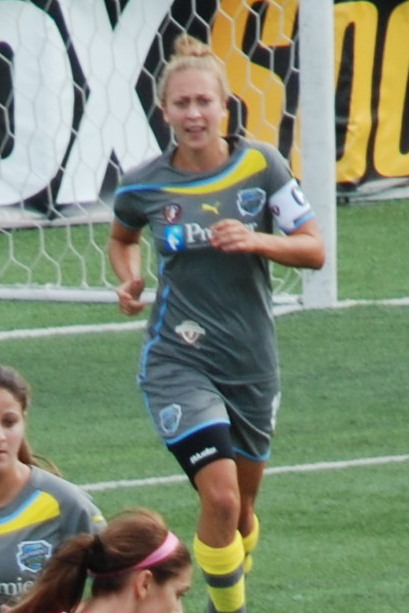
- Krzysik in 2011

Personal information
- Full name: Nicole Marie Phillips
- Birth name: Nicole Marie Krzysik
- Date of birth: 23 May 1987 (age 39)
- Place of birth: Ridgewood, New Jersey, United States
- Height: 1.70 m (5 ft 7 in)
- Positions: Defender; midfielder

College career
| Years | Team | Apps | (Gls) |
| 2005–2008 | Virginia Cavaliers | | |

Senior career*
| Years | Team | Apps | (Gls) |
| 2002–04 | New Jersey Lady Stallions | 15 | (0) |
| 2005 | New York Magic | 4 | (0) |
| 2007 | Jersey Sky Blue | 10 | (0) |
| 2008 | Richmond Kickers Destiny | 6 | (0) |
| 2009 | Chicago Red Stars | 14 | (0) |
| 2010–11 | Philadelphia Independence | 41 | (0) |
| 2012 | New York Fury | | |
| 2013 | San Diego WFC SeaLions | | |
| 2014 | FC Kansas City | 23 | (1) |

International career
- United States U-17
- United States U-19/U-20
| | United States U-21/U-23 | 13 | (0) |
| 2013–2014 | Poland | 6 | (0) |
- * Club domestic league appearances and goals

Nicole Marie Phillips (née Krzysik; born 23 May 1987) is an American-born Polish former professional footballer who played as a defender and midfielder. She has been a member of the Poland national team. She previously played for the Chicago Red Stars and the Philadelphia Independence in the WPS, and the United States U-20 national soccer team.

== Early life ==
Born in Ridgewood, New Jersey, to parents, Linda and Joseph Krzysik, Nikki attended Clifton High School in her hometown of Clifton, New Jersey. She set the school's records for goals scored in a season with 21 and career goals with 55. In 2004, she was named NSCAA High School Scholar-Athlete of the Year. She was also a two-time Parade Magazine All-American.

=== University of Virginia ===
Krzysik attended the University of Virginia where she anchored the Cavalier defense for four seasons. As a freshman in 2005, Krzysik started all 25 games. During her junior year, she started on a defensive unit that led the nation in goals against average (0.40) and set a school record with 15 shutouts. She was named All-ACC first team twice, in 2007 and 2008. As a senior, she was named Atlantic Coast Conference Defensive Player of the Year and was a semi-finalist for the Hermann Trophy. She played every minute and led the defensive line that posted nine shutouts and allowed 5.1 shots per game. A versatile player, Krzysik scored three goals and provided three assists.

== Playing career ==
=== Club ===
==== Chicago Red Stars, 2009 ====
Krzysik was selected by the Chicago Red Stars of the WPS in the second round (13th overall) of the 2009 WPS Draft. She appeared in 14 games, making 10 starts during the 2009 season.

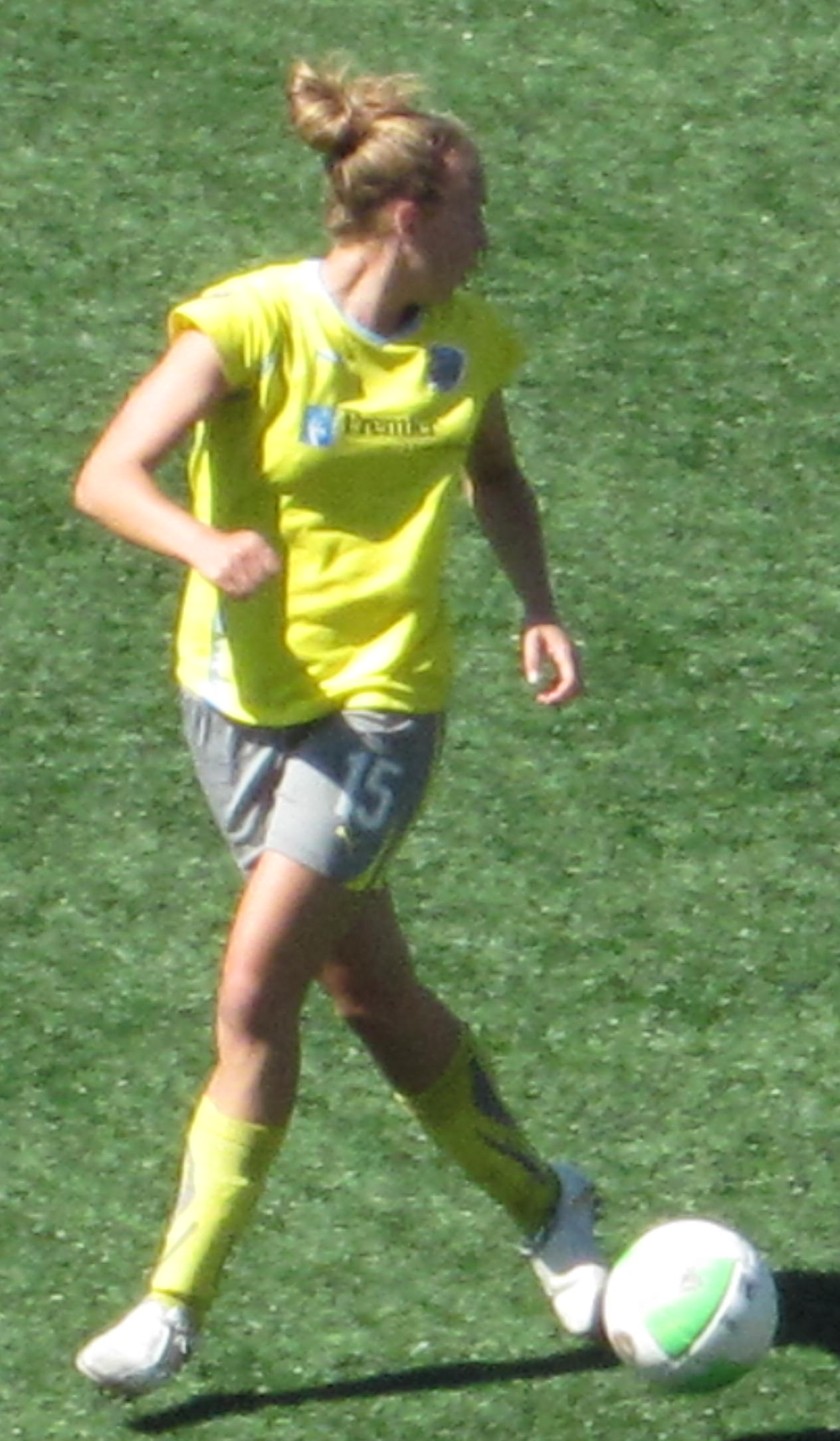
Krzysik playing in the 2010 WPS Championship game for Philadelphia Independence

==== Philadelphia Independence, 2010–11 ====
Krzysik was selected as the fifth overall pick by the Philadelphia Independence during the 2009 WPS Expansion Draft. She appeared in 23 games for a total of 2030 minutes during the 2010 season.

Krzysik returned to the Independence for the 2011 season and was named captain of the team after two games into the season. She was also nominated for WPS Defender of the Year.

==== FC Kansas City, 2014 ====
Krzysik was selected as the first pick (second overall) by the Seattle Reign FC in the 2013 NWSL Supplemental Draft for the inaugural season of the NWSL; however, she opted not to play. In 2013, her player rights were traded to FC Kansas City.

=== International ===
Krzysik represented the United States at the U-16, U-1, U-21, U-23 levels. She played for the United States at the 2004 U-19 and 2006 U-20 World Championships and was instrumental in the United States winning the 2006 CONCACAF U-20 Final Women's Qualifying Tournament. In 2008, she made 11 starts for the United States U-23 women's national soccer team.

Krzysik made her first appearance for Poland in the fall of 2013.

== Personal life ==
She married John Phillips in 2013.

== Career statistics ==
=== International ===
Appearances and goals by national team and year
| National team | Year | Apps | Goals |
|---|---|---|---|
| Poland | 2013 | 5 | 0 |
| Poland | 2014 | 1 | 0 |
| Total | | 6 | 0 |

== Honors ==
FC Kansas City

- NWSL Championship: 2014
