= Katrín Ómarsdóttir =

Icelandic footballer (born 1987)

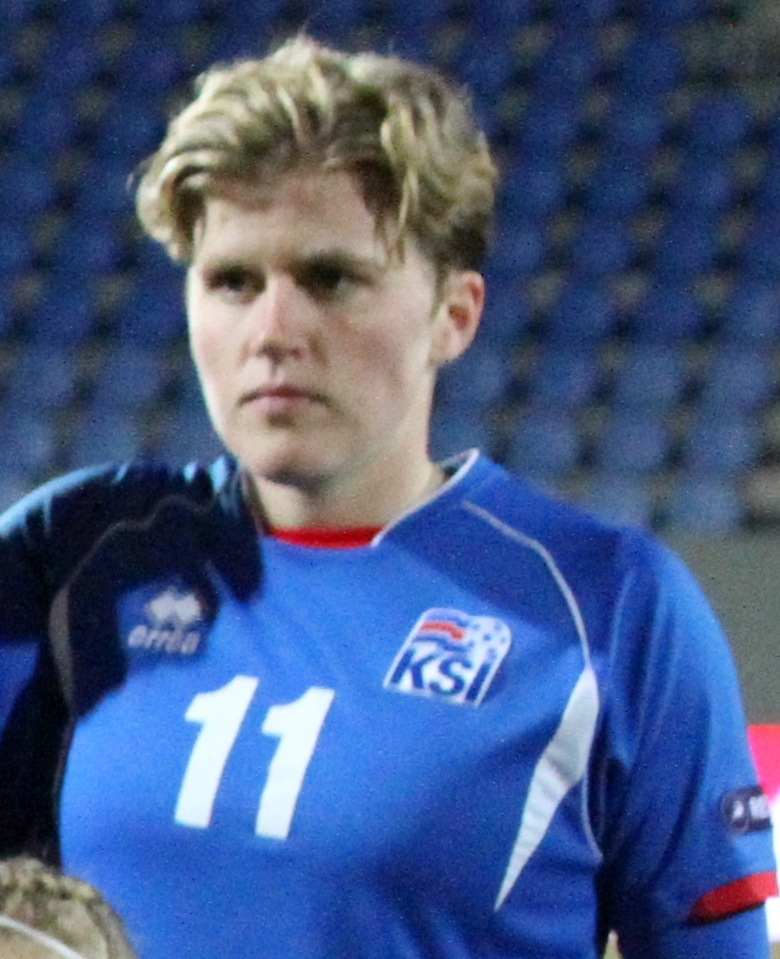
- Katrín with Iceland in 2012

Personal information
- Full name: Katrín Ómarsdóttir
- Date of birth: 27 June 1987 (age 39)
- Place of birth: Hamburg, West Germany
- Height: 5 ft 8 in (1.73 m)
- Position: Midfielder

College career
Years	Team	Apps	(Gls)
2008–2010	California Golden Bears		

Senior career*
Years	Team	Apps	(Gls)
2001–2009	KR	70	(27)
2010	Kristianstads DFF	8	(2)
2011	Orange County Waves	9	(6)
2012	Kristianstads DFF	21	(4)
2013–2015	Liverpool Ladies	35	(3)
2016	Doncaster Rovers Belles	14	(1)
2017–2021	KR	56	(13)

International career^{‡}
2002–2004	Iceland U-17	8	(2)
2004–2006	Iceland U-19	9	(4)
2006	Iceland U-21	4	(0)
2006–2014	Iceland	69	(10)
- * Club domestic league appearances and goals as of 20 July 2020 (UTC) ‡ National team caps and goals as of 16:10, 19 December 2015 (UTC)

Katrín Ómarsdóttir (born 27 June 1987) is an Icelandic football coach and former player who played the midfielder position. Before spending four seasons in the English FA WSL with Liverpool and Doncaster Rovers Belles from 2013, she had played professional football in Sweden and the United States. Katrín has over 60 caps for Iceland's national team and represented her country at the 2009 and 2013 editions of the UEFA Women's Championship.

== Club career ==
Born in Hamburg, Katrín made her club debut for KR of the Úrvalsdeild kvenna when she was 14 years old. She represented KR in the inaugural season of the UEFA Women's Cup in 2001–02.

Katrín attended the University of California, Berkeley in the United States and played for their women's soccer team from 2008 until 2010. She was signed by Kristianstads DFF of the Damallsvenskan for the summer of 2010. In 2011, she returned to California to play for new Women's Premier Soccer League (WPSL) franchise Orange County Waves. She scored six goals in nine regular season appearances as the team won the 2011 WPSL Championship.

In January 2012 Katrín agreed to join Philadelphia Independence of Women's Professional Soccer (WPS), but the league folded before the season started. Instead she returned to Kristianstads and played out the 2012 Damallsvenskan season, scoring four goals in 21 appearances.

In January 2013 Katrín signed for Liverpool Ladies, who had finished bottom of the FA WSL in 2011 and 2012 but were investing heavily in improving their team. She scored the second goal as Liverpool beat Bristol Academy 2–0 on the final day to secure the league title. Liverpool retained their league title in 2014 but fared poorly in 2015, finishing seventh of eight teams. Katrín was among four players to be released by the club at the end of the season.

On New Year's Eve 2015 Katrín joined Doncaster Rovers Belles, alongside veteran Liverpool teammate Becky Easton. Doncaster were relegated after only winning one game all season, secured by Katrín's winning goal against Reading F.C. Women. She left the club at the expiry of her one-year contract, and promptly re-joined KR. In November 2020 she joined the coaching staff at KR, but continued to be available a player.

In November 2021, Katrín joined the coach staff of Haukar. She left the club along with manager Guðrún Jóna Kristjánsdóttir in end of June 2022.

== International career ==
Katrín made her senior debut for Iceland in August 2006, a 1–0 home defeat to Sweden in the 2007 FIFA Women's World Cup qualifiers.

At UEFA Women's Euro 2009, Katrín played in two of the three group matches as Iceland were eliminated in the first round. National team coach Siggi Eyjólfsson also selected Katrín in his Iceland squad for UEFA Women's Euro 2013.

== International goals ==
No.	Date	Venue	Opponent	Score	Result	Competition
1.	28 May 2008	Kragujevac, Serbia	Serbia	4–0	4–0	UEFA Women's Euro 2009 qualifying
2.	21 June 2008	Reykjavík, Iceland	Slovenia	5–0	5–0	UEFA Women's Euro 2009 qualifying
3.	26 June 2008	Reykjavík, Iceland	Greece	6–0	7–0	UEFA Women's Euro 2009 qualifying
4.	28 October 2009	Belfast, Northern Ireland	Northern Ireland	1–0	1–0	2011 FIFA Women's World Cup qualification
5.	9 March 2011	Faro, Portugal	United States	1–1	2–4	2011 Algarve Cup
6.	21 June 2012	Lovech, Bulgaria	Bulgaria	7–0	10–0	UEFA Women's Euro 2013 qualifying
7.	13 March 2013	Parchal, Portugal	Hungary	3–0	4–1	2013 Algarve Cup
10.	31 October 2013	Belgrade, Serbia	Serbia	2–0	2–1	2015 FIFA Women's World Cup qualification

== Honours ==
WSL Women's Super League (2)

- 2013, 2014

Icelandic champion (2)

- 2002, 2003

Icelandic Cup (3)

- 2002, 2007, 2008
