= Veronica Cashman =

American-Mexican soccer and futsal player (born 1982)

Personal information
- Full name: Veronica Marie Zepeda Cashman (Note: This is the full name in her American nationality, after marriage. The full name in her Mexican nationality is Verónica Marie Zepeda Granado.)
- Birth name: Veronica Marie Zepeda
- Date of birth: June 11, 1982 (age 44)
- Place of birth: Corona, California, United States
- Height: 5 ft 2 in (1.57 m)
- Position: Forward

Youth career
- –2000: Jurupa Valley Jaguars

College career
Years	Team	Apps	(Gls)
2000–2003	Santa Clara Broncos	83	(27)

Senior career*
Years	Team	Apps	(Gls)
- Claremont Stars

International career
- United States U18
- United States U21
1998–2000	United States	5	(1)
2004	Mexico	2	(0)
- United States (futsal)

Managerial career
- Santa Clara Sporting
- * Club domestic league appearances and goals

Veronica Marie Zepeda Cashman (née Zepeda; born June 11, 1982) is an American-Mexican former soccer and futsal player who played as a forward. She appeared in friendly matches for both the United States and Mexico women's national teams during her career.

== Playing career ==
=== High school and college ===
Zepeda Cashman played for the Jurupa Valley Jaguars in high school, where she was a two-time Parade High School All-American. In college, she played for the Santa Clara Broncos, winning the 2001 NCAA Division I Women's Soccer Tournament with the school. Though she dealt with injuries throughout her college career, she was named a Third-Team All-American in 2001, and was included in the NCAA All-Tournament Team in 2001 and 2002. She was also named WCC Freshman of the Year and the school's Rookie of the Year in 2000, and was selected in the All-West Region First Team in 2001 and Second Team in 2000. She was included in the All-WCC First Team in 2000 and 2001, and Second Team in 2002. During her collegiate career, she made 83 appearances for Santa Clara, scoring 27 goals and recording 24 assists.

In 2015, Zepeda Cashman was selected to the CIF 100th Anniversary Winter All-Century Team.

=== Club ===
Zepeda Cashman played for the Claremont Stars club team.

=== International ===
Zepeda Cashman made her international debut for the United States on December 16, 1998, in a friendly match against Ukraine. In total, she made five appearances for the U.S. and scored two goals, earning her final cap on July 7, 2000, in a friendly match against Italy.

Through her parents, she was also eligible to represent Mexico internationally. She made her international debut for the team on July 8, 2004, in a 1–2 friendly loss against Australia, in preparation for the 2004 Summer Olympics. She earned her second and final cap three days later against the same opponent, which finished as a 2–0 win.

=== Futsal ===
Zepeda Cashman later played futsal and was part of the United States team which won the 2017 Women's Futsal World Cup in Spain, which was organized by the International Futsal Alliance.

== Coaching career ==
She serves as the coach of the various girls' youth teams of Santa Clara Sporting, where she was chosen as the club's coach of the year in 2014.

== Personal life ==
Zepeda Cashman was born in Corona, California, though Riverside is her hometown, and was born to Mexican parents. She is married, having taken the married name of Cashman.

== Career statistics ==
=== International ===
Team	Year	Apps	Goals
United States	1998	1	0
United States	2000	4	1
United States	Total	5	1
Mexico	2004	2	0
Mexico	Total	2	0
Career total		7	1

=== International goals ===
No.	Date	Location	Opponent	Score	Result	Competition
1	January 7, 2000	Melbourne, Australia	Czech Republic	8–0	8–1	2000 Australia Cup
