= Kristi DeVert =

American soccer player (born 1973)

Personal information
- Full name: Kristine A. DeVert-Juarez
- Birth name: Kristine A. DeVert
- Date of birth: March 14, 1973 (age 53)
- Place of birth: Petaluma, California, U.S.
- Height: 5 ft 8 in (1.73 m)
- Position: Midfielder

College career
Years	Team	Apps	(Gls)
1991–1992	Santa Clara Broncos	?	(9)
1993–1994	Pepperdine Waves	36	(14)

International career
- United States U16
- United States U20
1997	United States	4	(1)

Kristine A. DeVert-Juarez (née DeVert; born March 14, 1973) is an American former soccer player who played as a midfielder, making four appearances for the United States women's national team.

== Career ==
In college, DeVert played for the Santa Clara Broncos from 1991 to 1992. She scored nine goals and recorded six assists for the Broncos. From 1993 to 1994, she played for the Pepperdine Waves, where she scored 14 goals and registered 14 assists in 36 appearances, holding the school record for career assists per game. She was included in the All-WCC Second Team in 1994.

DeVert played for the U.S. under-16 and under-20 national teams. She made her international debut for the United States on October 9, 1997 in a friendly match against Germany. In total, she made four appearances for the U.S. and scored one goal, earning her final cap on December 13, 1997 in a friendly match against Brazil.

== Personal life ==
DeVert, a native of Petaluma, California, graduated from Pepperdine University with a degree in kinesiology. DeVert married Carlos Juarez, a former college soccer player who also coached the San Diego Spirit, and has four children.

== Career statistics ==
=== International ===
United States
Year	Apps	Goals
1997	4	1
Total	4	1

=== International goals ===
No.	Date	Location	Opponent	Result	Competition
1	October 30, 1997	Chattanooga, Tennessee, United States	Sweden	3–1	Friendly
