= Kiki Bosio =

American former soccer player

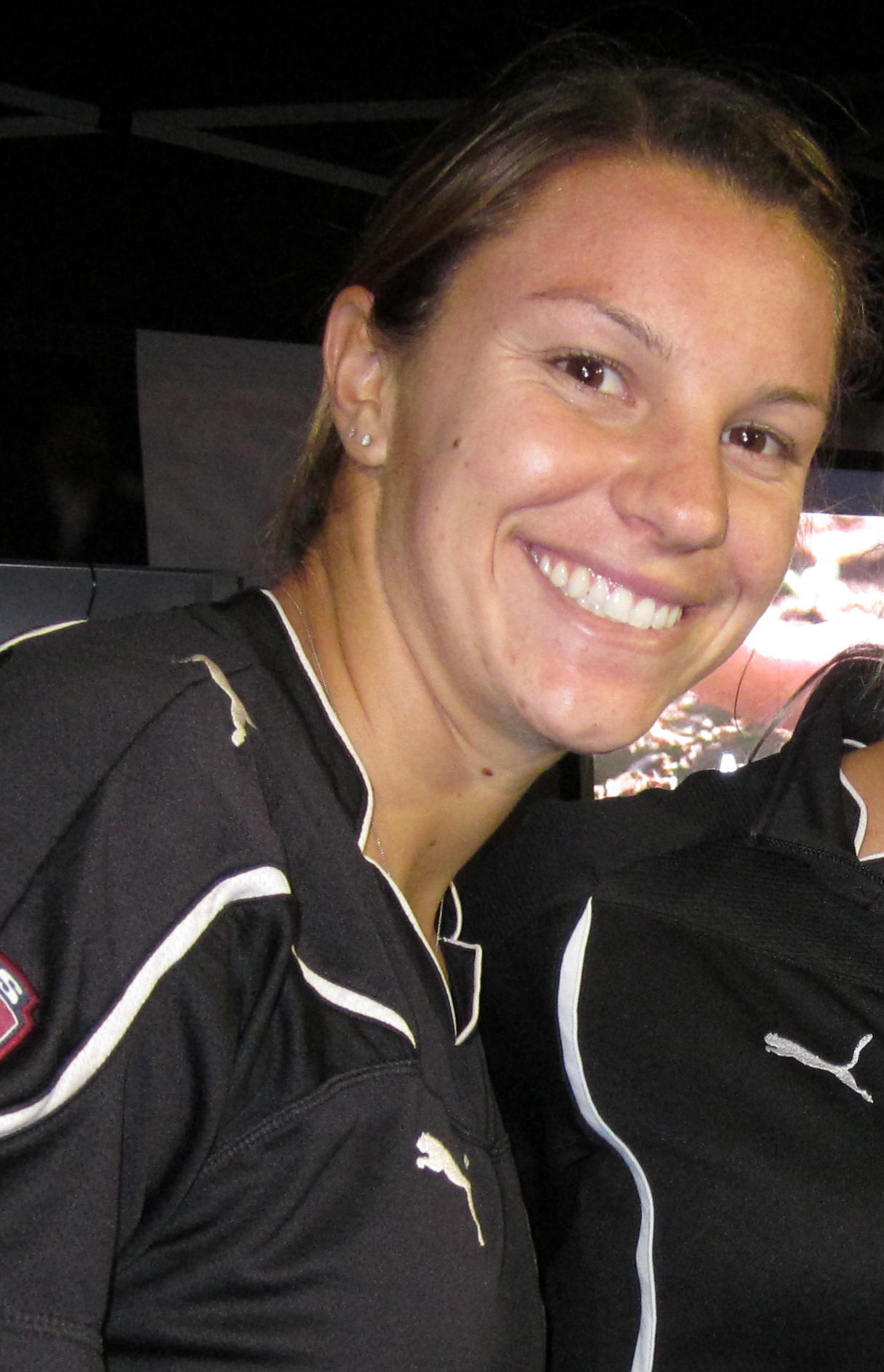
- Bosio with the Gold Pride in September 2010

Personal information
- Full name: Kiara Michelle Bosio
- Date of birth: November 3, 1987 (age 38)
- Place of birth: Anaheim, California, United States
- Height: 5 ft 7 in (1.70 m)
- Position: Forward

Youth career
- 2005–2006: Southern California Blues
- 2002–2005: Laguna Hills Eclipse

College career
Years	Team	Apps	(Gls)
2006–2009	Santa Clara Broncos		

Senior career*
Years	Team	Apps	(Gls)
2007–2009	Ajax America Women		
2010	FC Gold Pride	18	(0)
2011	Orange County Waves	9	(3)

International career
2003–2004	United States U-17		
2007–2009	United States U-23		
- * Club domestic league appearances and goals

Kiara Michelle "Kiki" Bosio (born November 3, 1987) is an American former soccer player from Mission Viejo, California. She played as a forward for the Women's Professional Soccer (WPS) club FC Gold Pride and the United States women's national under-23 soccer team.

Bosio played college soccer for Santa Clara Broncos, where she became known for her acrobatic flip throw-ins. While at University she also occasionally turned out for Ajax America Women of the Women's Premier Soccer League (WPSL).

In 2011 Bosio played for Orange County Waves alongside her sister Dani. She scored three goals in nine regular season appearances as the team won the 2011 WPSL Championship.
