= Brittany Bock =

American soccer player (born 1987)

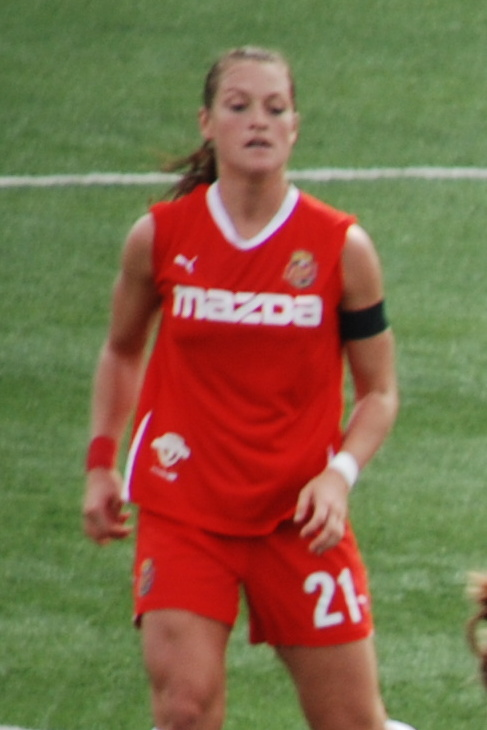
- Bock in 2011

Personal information
- Full name: Brittany Christine Bock
- Date of birth: April 11, 1987 (age 39)
- Place of birth: Naperville, Illinois, U.S.
- Height: 5 ft 7 in (1.70 m)
- Position: Midfielder

Youth career
- 1998–2001: Team Chicago Soccer Club
- 2002–2004: Windy City Pride
- 2004–2005: Eclipse Select

College career
Years	Team	Apps	(Gls)
2005–2008	Notre Dame Fighting Irish	92	(46)

Senior career*
Years	Team	Apps	(Gls)
2005–2006	F.C. Indiana	14	(4)
2009	Los Angeles Sol	19	(2)
2010	Washington Freedom	14	(0)
2011	Western New York Flash	18	(1)
2012	Colorado Rush	12	(4)
2012	Vittsjö GIK	3	(0)
2013	Sky Blue FC	7	(0)
2014–2015	Houston Dash	6	(0)
2016	Chicago Red Stars	0	(0)

International career^{‡}
2006	United States U-20		
2007–2009	United States U-23		
- * Club domestic league appearances and goals as of July 16, 2018 ‡ National team caps and goals as of September 24, 2009

Brittany Christine Bock (born April 11, 1987) is a retired American women's soccer midfielder.

== Early life ==
Bock was born in Naperville, Illinois and attended Neuqua Valley High School. In 2009, she was enrolled in the Mendoza College of Business at the University of Notre Dame, majoring in Marketing.

Bock played for Windy City Pride from 2002 to 2004 under Ko Thanadabouth. Prior to that she played with Team Chicago Soccer Club under Hudson Fortune. In 2004 and 2005, she played for the Eclipse Select Soccer Club alongside future Notre Dame teammate Elise Weber.

=== University of Notre Dame ===
Bock became a highly influential player during her career at Notre Dame. In the 2006 NCAA Division I women's soccer tournament finals, Notre Dame lost 2–1 to the University of North Carolina. Bock scored the only goal for the Irish in the 81st minute and was named to the all-tournament team.

== Club career ==
=== Los Angeles Sol ===
Bock was the fifth overall pick in the 2009 Women's Professional Soccer draft, going to Los Angeles Sol, becoming part of a defense that allowed 10 goals in 21 matches.

=== Washington Freedom ===
When the Sol folded in January 2010, Bock was drafted by the Washington Freedom in the ensuing 2010 Dispersal Draft.

=== Western New York Flash ===
In 2011, Bock was signed by the Western New York Flash.

=== Colorado Rush ===
In 2012 after the WPS suspended operations, the Colorado Rush of the USL W-League signed Bock for the 2012 season. While with the Rush, she led the team in minutes over 12 appearances and scored four goals.

=== Sky Blue FC ===
On February 1, 2013, Sky Blue FC of the National Women's Soccer League announced that Bock had agreed to terms and signed a contract with the club.

=== Houston Dash ===
On January 10, 2014, the Houston Dash selected Bock with the first pick in the 2014 NWSL Expansion Draft. The move reunited her with former Notre Dame coach Randy Waldrum. She tore her left anterior cruciate ligament in the 23rd minute of the Dash's inaugural game and was out for the rest of the season.

The Dash re-signed Bock in September 2014, but she made only five appearances in the 2015 season before suffering a season-ending double hernia.

She was waived by the Houston Dash in October 2015.

=== Chicago Red Stars ===
The Chicago Red Stars claimed the rights to sign Bock off waivers on October 21, 2015. However, she was not added to the team's 2016 roster and made no appearances for the club.

== International career ==
Bock was a member of the fourth-place United States U-20 women's national soccer team that competed at the 2006 FIFA U-20 Women's World Championship in Russia alongside Notre Dame classmate Carrie Dew.

In 2009, Bock was in the United States U-23 women's national soccer team player pool.
