= Jaimel Johnson =

American soccer player (born 1986)

Personal information
- Full name: Jaimel LaVonne Johnson
- Date of birth: November 27, 1986 (age 39)
- Place of birth: Greenville, South Carolina
- Height: 5 ft 8 in (1.73 m)
- Position: Goalkeeper

College career
Years	Team	Apps	(Gls)
2005–2008	Tennessee	61	(0)

Senior career*
Years	Team	Apps	(Gls)
2009	Chicago Red Stars		

Managerial career
- 2010–2012: University of Iowa
- 2012–2016: University of Texas
- * Club domestic league appearances and goals

Jaimel Johnson (born November 27, 1986) is a retired American soccer goalkeeper. She played collegiately at University of Tennessee. She was drafted by the Boston Breakers in 2009 and went on to be rostered on the Chicago Red Stars. After her playing career, she went into coaching.

== Early life ==
Johnson was born in Greenville, South Carolina and grew up in Kettering, Ohio. She attended Chaminade Julienne High School. She grew up playing sports, which included dance, basketball, and soccer.

== Playing career ==
=== High School ===
Johnson was a four-year member of the varsity soccer team at Chaminade Julienne High School. She graduated with the single-season school records for shutouts and goals against average. Johnson also played for the Olympic Development Program. Johnson's club team, Ohio Elite, won four consecutive state titles. She became a goalkeeper in high school when one day the team was without one, so she was told that she should hop in goal because she was good with her hands from playing basketball.

=== College ===
As a sophomore in high school, she gained the interest of then Tennessee head coach, Angela Kelly, when Johnson's club team travelled to Knoxville and played against Tennessee. When she enrolled in 2005, Johnson became the first Black goalkeeper at Tennessee.

Johnson was a three-year starter at the University of Tennessee. She recorded three assists during her college career, two of which were for game winning goals. The team won the SEC Championship twice during her tenure. She was the first Tennessee soccer player to win the SEC Tournament MVP Award. She still holds the Tennessee record (as of 2022) for most saves in a season with 111 for the 2007 season.

Her other accolades include being named an All-American by the National Soccer Coaches Association of America and being named to the All-SEC First Team. She was named to the Hermann Trophy watch list and was a nominee for the NCAA Woman of the Year Award.

Johnson majored in sport management with a minor in business. She was on the SEC Academic Honor Roll all four years, and she earned SEC All-Academic Team honors her final three years.

=== Club ===
Johnson was drafted by the Boston Breakers in 2009. She went on to be rostered with the Chicago Red Stars. She was nominated for the WPS' Hint Water Sportswoman of the Year Award.

== Coaching career ==
In May 2010, Johnson was announced as an assistant coach for the University of Iowa. After two seasons at Iowa, Johnson was announced as an assistant coach for the University of Texas. This reunited Johnson with her college coach, Angela Kelly. Johnson remained with the program for four years.

== Personal life ==
Johnson lives in Atlanta. She runs The Goal Standard, her private training academy. In 2022, she served as an envoy to Benin for the U.S. Department of State with the Sports Diplomacy program.
