= Santa Clara Broncos women's soccer =

American college soccer team

- Founded: 1980
- University: Santa Clara University
- Head coach: Jerry Smith (34th season)
- Conference: WCC
- Location: Santa Clara, California, US
- Stadium: Stevens Stadium (capacity: 7,000)
- Nickname: Broncos
- Colors: Maroon and white

NCAA tournament championships
- 2001, 2020

NCAA tournament runner-up
- 2002

NCAA tournament College Cup
- 1989, 1990, 1992, 1996, 1997, 1998, 1999, 2001, 2002, 2004, 2020, 2021

NCAA tournament Quarterfinals
- 1989, 1990, 1992, 1995, 1996, 1997, 1998, 1999, 2000, 2001, 2002, 2003, 2004, 2005, 2016, 2020, 2021

NCAA tournament Round of 16
- 2016, 2020, 2021

NCAA tournament appearances
- 1989, 1990, 1991, 1992, 1993, 1994, 1995, 1996, 1997, 1998, 1999, 2000, 2001, 2002, 2003, 2004, 2005, 2006, 2007, 2009, 2010, 2011, 2012, 2013, 2015, 2016, 2017, 2018, 2019, 2020, 2021, 2022, 2023, 2024

The Santa Clara Broncos women's soccer team represents Santa Clara University in National Collegiate Athletic Association Division I women's soccer. The team competes in the West Coast Conference and is currently coached by Jerry Smith. The Broncos won national championships in 2001 and 2020.

== All-Time Coaching Records ==
All-Time Coaching Records
Years	Coach	Records
1980	Janice Nay	1–6–1 (.188)
1981–1984	Phil Wright	41–19–11 (.655)
1985–1986	Mark Narcisso	25–8–3 (.736)
1987–	Jerry Smith	497–161–64 (.733)

== Year-by-year statistical leaders ==
Year-by-Year Statistical Leaders
Year	Goals Leader	G	Assists Leader	A
1980	Not available	N/A	Not available	N/A
1981	Julie Long	13	Karen Medved	10
1982	Jenny Fechner	27	Karen Medved	10
1983	Debbi Hagan	6	Karen Medved	7
1984	Jenny Fechner	18	Karen Medved	16
1985	Jenny Fechner	17	Jenni Symons	11
1986	Jenni Symons	20	Sophia Vincent	8
1987	Jenni Symons	15	Tamie Batista	17
1988	Jenni Symons	2	Tamie Batista	6
1988	Jenni Symons	2	Jenni Symons	6
1989	Brandi Chastain	11	Trish Gretton	10
1990	Brandi Chastain	22	Monica Murnane	12
1991	Kristi DeVert	8	Monica Murnane	5
1992	Debbie Norbutas	11	Shannon Douglas	6
1993	Mikka Hansen	15	Jennifer Lalor	15
1994	Erin Martinez	13	Jennifer Lalor	20
1995	Mikka Hansen	14	Samantha Obara	8
1996	Mikka Hansen	14	Jennifer Lalor	17
1996	Jacqui Little	14	Jennifer Lalor	17
1997	Mandy Clemens	14	Mandy Clemens	15
1997	Jacqui Little	14	Mandy Clemens	15
1998	Mandy Clemens	16	Mandy Clemens	16
1999	Mandy Clemens	24	Mandy Clemens	23
2000	Kristi Candau	11	Heather Aldama	13
2001	Aly Wagner	17	Aly Wagner	20
2002	Kristi Candau	13	Megan Kakadelas	14
2003	Leslie Osborne	11	Leslie Osborne	6
2003	Leslie Osborne	11	Veronica Zepeda	6
2004	Leslie Osborne	9	Megan Kakadelas	7
2005	Jordan Angeli	12	Meagan Snell	6
2006	Meagan Snell	11	Kiki Bosio	8
2007	Kiki Bosio	7	Kiki Bosio	6
2007	Brittany Klein	7	Kiki Bosio	6
2008	Jen LaPonte	4	Katherine Reynolds	4
2009	Jordan Angeli	7	Kiki Bosio	7
2010	Anessa Patton	9	Julie Johnston	5
2011	Julie Johnston	9	Julie Johnston	4
2011	Julie Johnston	9	Mana Shim	4
2012	Julie Johnston	8	Sofia Huerta	6
2013	Sofia Huerta	16	Sofia Huerta	8
2013	Sofia Huerta	16	Julie Johnston	8
2014	Sofia Huerta	17	Kat McAuliffe	6
2015	Julie Vass	8	Megan Crosson	7
2016	Jordan Jesolva	10	Jordan Jesolva	4
2017	Kelsey Turnbow	13	María Sánchez	6
2018	María Sánchez	8	María Sánchez	16
2018	Kelsey Turnbow	8	María Sánchez	16
2019	Izzy D'Aquila	15	Kelcie Hedge	10
2019	Kelsey Turnbow	15	Kelsey Turnbow	10
2020	Kelsey Turnbow	10	Sally Menti	6
2021	Kelsey Turnbow	11	Kelsey Turnbow	12
2022	Izzy D'Aquila	19	Colby Barnett	8
2022	Izzy D'Aquila	19	Annie Karich	8
