= Brittany Klein =

American soccer player

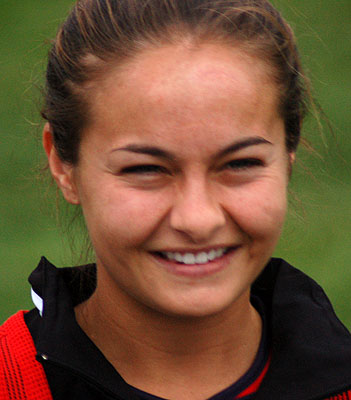
- Klein in 2009

Personal information
- Full name: Brittany Michelle Klein
- Date of birth: October 29, 1986 (age 40)
- Place of birth: Arcadia, California, U.S.
- Height: 5 ft 3 in (1.60 m)
- Position: Midfielder

College career
Years	Team	Apps	(Gls)
2004–2007	Santa Clara Broncos		

Senior career*
Years	Team	Apps	(Gls)
2008	Pali Blues	5	(0)
2009–2010	Chicago Red Stars	20	(1)
2010	Washington Freedom		

International career
	United States U-23	12	(3)
- * Club domestic league appearances and goals

Brittany Michelle Klein (born October 29, 1986) is an American soccer midfielder. Klein is a former member of the United States women's national under-23 soccer team and a WPS All-Star in 2009.

== Playing career ==
=== Youth Club ===
Klein played for Laguna Hills Eclipse. Her team won the United States Youth Soccer Association National Championship in 2002 and 2005, and they were State Cup semi-finalist in 2003.

=== WPS ===
Klein was selected 14th overall in the 2009 WPS Draft. For the 2009 season, she started every game and recorded a goal and 3 assists. Klein was also named an All-Star.

Klein again made the Red Stars' opening day roster in 2010. Following the dissolution of Saint Louis Athletica in late May 2010, the Red Stars released Klein in order to be able to sign Anita Asante, who had become a free agent along with the rest of Saint Louis' roster. Red Stars President and General Manager, Marcia McDermott, said of Klein, "It's not easy to release a player of Brit's caliber and character. But with the unusual events in the past 10 days, we saw opportunities to address team needs."

Klein signed with the Washington Freedom on June 29, 2010. She played in three matches, starting one. The Freedom lost in the first round of the playoffs to the Philadelphia Independence.

=== WPSL ===
In 2011, Klein joined the Orange County Waves for their first and only season. The Waves won the WPSL championship, 2-1 against the Chicago Red Stars, Klein's former club. Klein provided the assist on the game winning goal.

== Personal life ==
.
