= Orange County Waves =

Professional women's soccer team, based in Orange County, California, U.S.

- Full name: Orange County Waves
- Nicknames: The OC, Waves
- Founded: 2011
- Dissolved: 2011
- Stadium: Orange Coast College, Costa Mesa, California
- 2011: Women's Premier Soccer League, 1st
Home colors	Away colors

The Orange County Waves was a professional women's soccer team, based in Orange County, California. The team began play in 2011, won the Women's Premier Soccer League (WPSL) National Championship and then folded at the end of its first season.

== History ==
Orange County Waves was one of two professional teams founded for the 2011 Women's Premier Soccer League (WPSL) by the same team of investors; alongside the Bay Area Breeze, based in Northern California.

Originally conceived as Orange County Sol, the team aimed to be a continuation of the defunct Women's Professional Soccer (WPS) franchise Los Angeles Sol. Anschutz Entertainment Group, rightholders of the Sol name, blocked its use for the new teams.

Former Sol coach Abner Rogers was recruited as well as several ex-Sol players. It was intended that the Waves would progress to WPS, then the top level of professional women's football in the United States. Experienced Ajax America Women coach Brian Boswell joined as assistant to Rogers, who flew to the 2011 Algarve Cup to scout for players. A strong squad was assembled, comprising professionals except for five amateur players who needed to preserve their college soccer eligibility.

The team won the national WPSL Championship in its only season of existence, beating Chicago Red Stars 2–1 after extra time in the final. Rogers was named Coach of the Year. In December 2011 the team's owners withdrew funding from Orange County Waves, in order to focus their attentions on Bay Area Breeze.

== 2011 squad ==
Note: Flags indicate national team as defined under FIFA eligibility rules; some limited exceptions apply. Players may hold more than one non-FIFA nationality.

No.	Pos.	Nation	Player
0	GK	USA	Katie Loomis
1	GK	MEX	Sophia Perez
2	DF	ENG	Kelly Lawrence
3	MF	USA	Brittany Klein
4	DF	USA	Jenny Hammond
5	DF	USA	Sabrina DeMonte
6	DF	USA	Colette Swensen
7	FW	USA	Tanya Taylor
8	MF	USA	Dani Bosio
9	FW	USA	Kiki Bosio

No.	Pos.	Nation	Player
10	DF	USA	Kika Toulouse
11	MF	ISL	Katrín Ómarsdóttir
12	DF	USA	Ashlee Elliott
13	FW	USA	Laurel Pastor
14	DF	USA	Kristina Larsen
15	DF	CZE	Vendula Strnadova
18	FW	USA	Shannon Cross
19	FW	USA	Meagan Snell
20	FW	USA	Kimberly Allard
21	DF	USA	Tracy Hamm

== Year-by-year ==
Year	Division	League	Reg. season	Playoffs	National Cup
2011	2	WPSL	1st, Pacific South	Champions	
