= Sheldon Thomas (activist) =

British activist

- Born: Sheldon Sebastian Thomas; November 1964 (age 61)
- Known for: Founder and chief executive of Gangsline Foundation Trust

Sheldon Sebastian Thomas (born November 1964) was a British gang member and is the founder and chief executive of Gangsline Foundation Trust, a nonprofit organisation established in 2007 to provide assistance to young people involved in gang culture, and which also deals with grooming and radicalisation. He has contributed to television and radio and has been involved in work with Scotland Yard and the Home Office.

== Early life ==
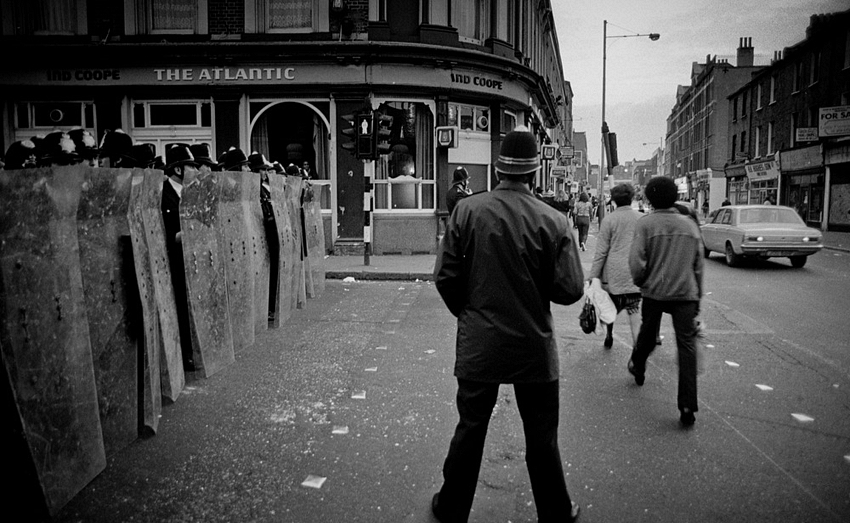
1981 Brixton Riots

Sheldon Thomas was born in November 1964, to Jamaican parents. During the 1970s, he was a member of a gang in London. He later told the Evening Standard “we called our gang the Black Moriah Posse after the infamous Jamaican Shower Posse, but unlike today, we were more concerned with fighting the National Front and racist police than killing other gang members”.

== Career ==
In 1981, he was active in the Brixton riots, and recounted his memoirs in interviews 30 years later. In 1985, 1986 or 1988, he became influenced by Haringey council leader Bernie Grant, and left gang culture. He subsequently gained a Certificate and Diploma in Management and a BA (Hons) in Marketing and Statistics.

=== Gangsline ===
Thomas founded and became the chief executive of Gangsline Foundation Trust, a nonprofit organisation established in 2007 to provide assistance to young people involved in gang culture, and which also deals with grooming and radicalisation. The organisation was incorporated as Gangsline Foundation Trust Limited in 2013.

He has contributed to television and radio and has been involved in work with Scotland Yard and the Home Office, when he was also advisor to Theresa May.

Thomas and his wife Michelle are also directors of the associated for-profit company Gangsline Limited from which they drew salaries of £72,443 for the year ended 30 September 2018, the last year for which accounts were filed.

In April 2020, he reported to Sky News that social distancing measures and increased police checks during the coronavirus pandemic in the UK resulted in a change of behaviour in frightened drug dealers, and a reduction of cuckooing activity and county lines drug trafficking.

== Personal life ==
He is married to Michelle Stead-Thomas and they have four children.
