= Jen LaPonte =

American soccer player

Jennifer LaPonte
Personal information
- Full name: Jennifer Diane LaPonte
- Date of birth: July 3, 1990 (age 36)
- Place of birth: Castro Valley, California, U.S.
- Height: 5 ft 3 in (1.60 m)
- Position: Defender

College career
Years	Team	Apps	(Gls)
2008–2011	Santa Clara Broncos		

Senior career*
Years	Team	Apps	(Gls)
2013	Sky Blue FC	0	(0)
2013	Portland Thorns FC	0	(0)
2013	Boston Breakers	0	(0)
2014	Seattle Reign FC	0	(0)
2014–2015	Houston Dash	6	(0)

International career
- United States U16-U23
- * Club domestic league appearances and goals as of September 15, 2015

Jennifer Diane LaPonte (born July 3, 1990) is an American soccer player who played as a defender.

== Early life ==
She was born in Castro Valley, California. She grew up playing for Mustang Fury-based out of Danville, California. She attended Santa Clara University, where she was a four-year letterwinner.

== Club career ==
She had played previously for Seattle Reign FC, Sky Blue FC, Portland Thorns FC and the Boston Breakers but did not make any appearances. On August 7, 2015, she signed with Houston Dash. She was released by the Dash in April 2016.

== International career ==
She was called up into the United States youth national teams, playing for the United States U14 all the way to the United States U23. She currently plays for the Puerto Rican women's national team.

== Honors ==
Seattle Reign

Runner-up

- National Women's Soccer League: 2014
