= Vendula Strnadová =

Czech footballer (born 1989)

Personal information
- Full name: Vendula Strnadová
- Date of birth: 20 November 1989 (age 36)
- Place of birth: Liberec, Czechoslovakia
- Height: 1.65 m (5 ft 5 in)
- Position: Midfielder

Youth career
- 2003–2006: Las Cruces Bulldawgs

College career
Years	Team	Apps	(Gls)
2007–2010	Memphis Tigers	88	(23)

Senior career*
Years	Team	Apps	(Gls)
2011	Atlanta Beat	2	(0)
2011	Orange County Waves		
2012	Afturelding	18	(2)
2013	FC Kansas City	0	(0)
2014–2019	Slovácko		

International career
2006–2008	Czech Republic U19	15	(2)
2009–2017	Czech Republic	6	(0)
- * Club domestic league appearances and goals

Vendula Strnadová (born 20 November 1989) is a Czech former footballer who played as a midfielder and made six appearances for the Czech Republic women's national team.

== Career ==
=== Youth and college ===
Strnadová attended Las Cruces High School from 2003 to 2007, where she played for the Bulldawgs. She was New Mexico's top scorer in high school women's football in 2004, and a two-time first team all-state selection, helping the team to win state championships in 2003 and 2005. She was also selected to the Olympic Development Program national pool, and led her club team to four state cup championships.

In college, Strnadová played for the Tigers of the University of Memphis from 2007 to 2010, helping the team to win four consecutive Conference USA titles. She scored 23 goals and recorded 17 assists in 88 appearances for the team. She holds the school record for the most matches played, and is eleventh all-time in goals and twelfth all-time in assists for the school (she was fifth in both after finishing her last season). She is also tied for eleventh at the school for points (sixth after finishing her last season). She was included in the NSCAA All-American third team in 2010, the NSCAA All-Central team in all four years (second team in 2007, first team from 2008 to 2010), the CoSIDA Academic All-America team in 2009 (third) and 2010 (second), and the NSCAA/Adidas Scholar All-America team in 2009 (second) and 2010 (first). She also won a number of conference awards, including the Conference USA Freshman of the Year in 2007, Offensive Player of the Year in 2008 and Scholar Athlete of the Year in 2011, and was included in the All-Conference team in all four years and the Academic All-Conference first team from 2008 to 2010.

=== Club ===
After finishing her college career with the Tigers, Strnadová signed as a free agent with Atlanta Beat of Women's Professional Soccer for the 2011 season. She made her professional debut for Atlanta in the opening match of the season on 9 April 2011, coming on as an 81st-minute substitute for India Trotter in the 4–1 home loss against the Boston Breakers. She made one more appearance for the Beat the following month, before being released by the team. She subsequently signed with Orange County Waves of the Women's Premier Soccer League.

The following year, Strnadová joined Icelandic club Afturelding of the Úrvalsdeild kvenna. She made 18 league appearances for the team, scoring 2 goals, while also making two appearances in the Icelandic Women's Football Cup. In 2013, she was invited to train with FC Kansas City of the NWSL after open tryouts, and was a reserve player for the team. However, she did not appear in the NWSL. From 2014 to 2019, Strnadová played for Czech club Slovácko in the Czech Women's First League, before retiring from football.

=== National team ===
Strnadová played for the Czech Republic under-19 team from 2006 to 2008, including qualification matches for the UEFA Women's Under-19 Championship. She made fifteen appearances and scored two goals for the under-19 team.

She made her senior international debut for the Czech Republic on 29 May 2009 in a friendly match against Poland, coming on as a substitute in the 53rd minute for Pavlína Nepokojová. The home match finished as a 2–1 win for the Czech Republic. In total, she made six appearances for the Czech Republic, earning her final cap on 8 March 2017 in the 2017 Cyprus Women's Cup match against Italy, which finished as a 6–2 loss.

== Personal life ==
Strnadová was born in Liberec to Jana and Ivan Strnadová. However, she grew up in Las Cruces, New Mexico after moving with her family to the United States at the age of 5, as her father got a job at New Mexico State University. She graduated from the University of Memphis in 2011 with a degree in exercise physiology. Her sisters also were footballers, with her older sibling Veronika playing for the New Mexico Lobos and was capped for the Czech Republic national team, while the younger sister Alena, a Czech youth international, also played at Memphis, including alongside Vendula during the 2010 season.

== Career statistics ==
=== International ===
Czech Republic
Year	Apps	Goals
2009	2	0
2016	1	0
2017	3	0
Total	6	0
