= Rachael Axon =

English footballer

Personal information
- Full name: Rachael Louise Axon
- Date of birth: 9 November 1985 (age 41)
- Place of birth: London, England
- Position: Midfielder

College career
Years	Team	Apps	(Gls)
2006	UAB Blazers		
2007–2009	Oregon State Beavers		

Senior career*
Years	Team	Apps	(Gls)
2001–2006	AFC Wimbledon		
2007–2008	Ottawa Fury		
2013	Avaldsnes IL	10	(0)
2013	Vitória das Tabocas	2	(0)
2014	Kolbotn Fotball	19	(1)
2015	Houston Dash	15	(1)
2016	Kolbotn Fotball	21	(4)
- * Club domestic league appearances and goals

Rachael Louise Axon (born 9 November 1985) is an English former footballer who played as a midfielder. She has previously played in Brazil, Norway and America.
