= Carleigh Williams =

American soccer player

Personal information
- Full name: Carleigh Williams
- Date of birth: December 4, 1992 (age 33)
- Place of birth: Beverly Hills, Florida, U.S.
- Height: 1.70 m (5 ft 7 in)
- Position: Defender

Team information
- Current team: FC Metz
- Number: 11

College career
Years	Team	Apps	(Gls)
2011–2014	UCF Knights		

Senior career*
Years	Team	Apps	(Gls)
2015	Houston Dash	2	(0)
2015	Amazon Grimstad	10	(0)
2016–2017	FC Metz	16	(1)
- * Club domestic league appearances and goals as of July 20, 2018

Carleigh Williams (born December 4, 1992) is an American soccer player. She recently played for the Houston Dash, which signed her in January 2015 and waived her in July 2015.
